= Li Yingjian =

Chinese footballer

Li Yingjian 李营健
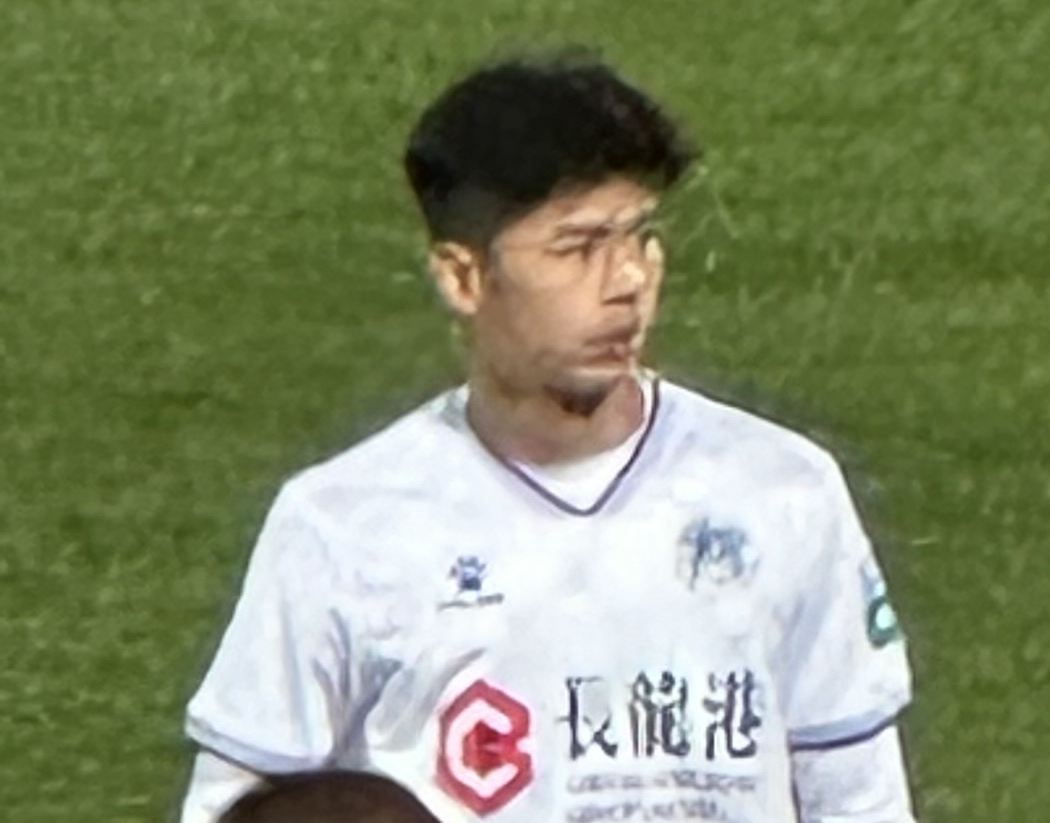
- Li Yingjian in April 2025

Personal information
- Full name: Li Yingjian
- Date of birth: 22 February 1991 (age 35)
- Place of birth: Sanshui, Guangdong, China
- Height: 1.83 m (6 ft 0 in)
- Positions: Striker; winger

Youth career
- 2004–2007: Dongguan Nancheng
- 2008: Shenzhen FC
- 2010–2011: Guangzhou Evergrande

Senior career*
Years	Team	Apps	(Gls)
2009	Shenzhen FC	0	(0)
2011	Guangzhou Youth	19	(4)
2012–2013	Shenzhen Fengpeng	34	(5)
2014–2018	Guizhou Zhicheng	62	(10)
2019–2021	Shaanxi Chang'an Athletic	26	(2)
2021	→Zibo Cuju (loan)	27	(1)
2022	Zibo Cuju	12	(2)
2022	→Dandong Tengyue (loan)	5	(0)
2023–2025	Shenzhen Juniors	37	(2)
- * Club domestic league appearances and goals as of 31 December 2020

Li Yingjian (simplified Chinese: 李营健; traditional Chinese: 李營健; pinyin: Lǐ Yíngjiàn; born 22 February 1991) is a Chinese footballer.

== Club career ==
Li Yingjian started his football career in 2004 when he received organized football training at Dongguan Nancheng. He joined Chinese Super League side Shenzhen FC's youth academy in 2008. He was promoted to Shenzhen's first team squad in 2009. Li joined Guangzhou Evergrande in 2010 and played for the club's youth team Guangzhou Youth in the China League Two in the 2011 season. Li moved to fellow League Two club Shenzhen Fengpeng in 2012 after Guangzhou Youth was dissolved. He lost his position in the 2013 season after manager Zhang Jun left the club.

Li transferred to China League Two side Guizhou Zhicheng in January 2014, rejoining Zhang Jun. He made his Super League debut on 3 March 2017 in a 1–1 home draw against Liaoning FC, coming on as a substitute for Liang Xueming in the 78th minute.

On 1 March 2019, Li transferred to League One newcomer Shaanxi Chang'an Athletic.

== Career statistics ==
As of 31 December 2020.

Club statistics
Club	Season	League			Cup		Continental		Other		Total	
Club	Season	Division	Apps	Goals	Apps	Goals	Apps	Goals	Apps	Goals	Apps	Goals
Shenzhen	2009	Chinese Super League	0	0	0	0	-		-		0	0
Guangzhou Youth	2011	China League Two	19	4	-		-		-		19	4
Shenzhen Fengpeng	2012	China League Two	27	5	-		-		-		27	5
Shenzhen Fengpeng	2013	China League Two	7	0	1	0	-		-		8	0
Shenzhen Fengpeng	Total		34	5	1	0	0	0	0	0	35	5
Guizhou Zhicheng	2014	China League Two	20	7	3	2	-		-		23	9
Guizhou Zhicheng	2015	China League One	18	3	2	0	-		-		20	3
Guizhou Zhicheng	2016	China League One	18	0	0	0	-		-		18	0
Guizhou Zhicheng	2017	Chinese Super League	5	0	1	0	-		-		6	0
Guizhou Zhicheng	2018	Chinese Super League	1	0	1	0	-		-		2	0
Guizhou Zhicheng	Total		62	10	7	2	0	0	0	0	69	12
Shaanxi Chang'an Athletic	2019	China League One	12	0	1	0	-		-		13	0
Shaanxi Chang'an Athletic	2020	China League One	14	2	-		-		-		14	2
Shaanxi Chang'an Athletic	Total		26	2	1	0	0	0	0	0	27	2
Career total			141	21	9	2	0	0	0	0	150	23
