= Yang Jian (footballer) =

Chinese footballer

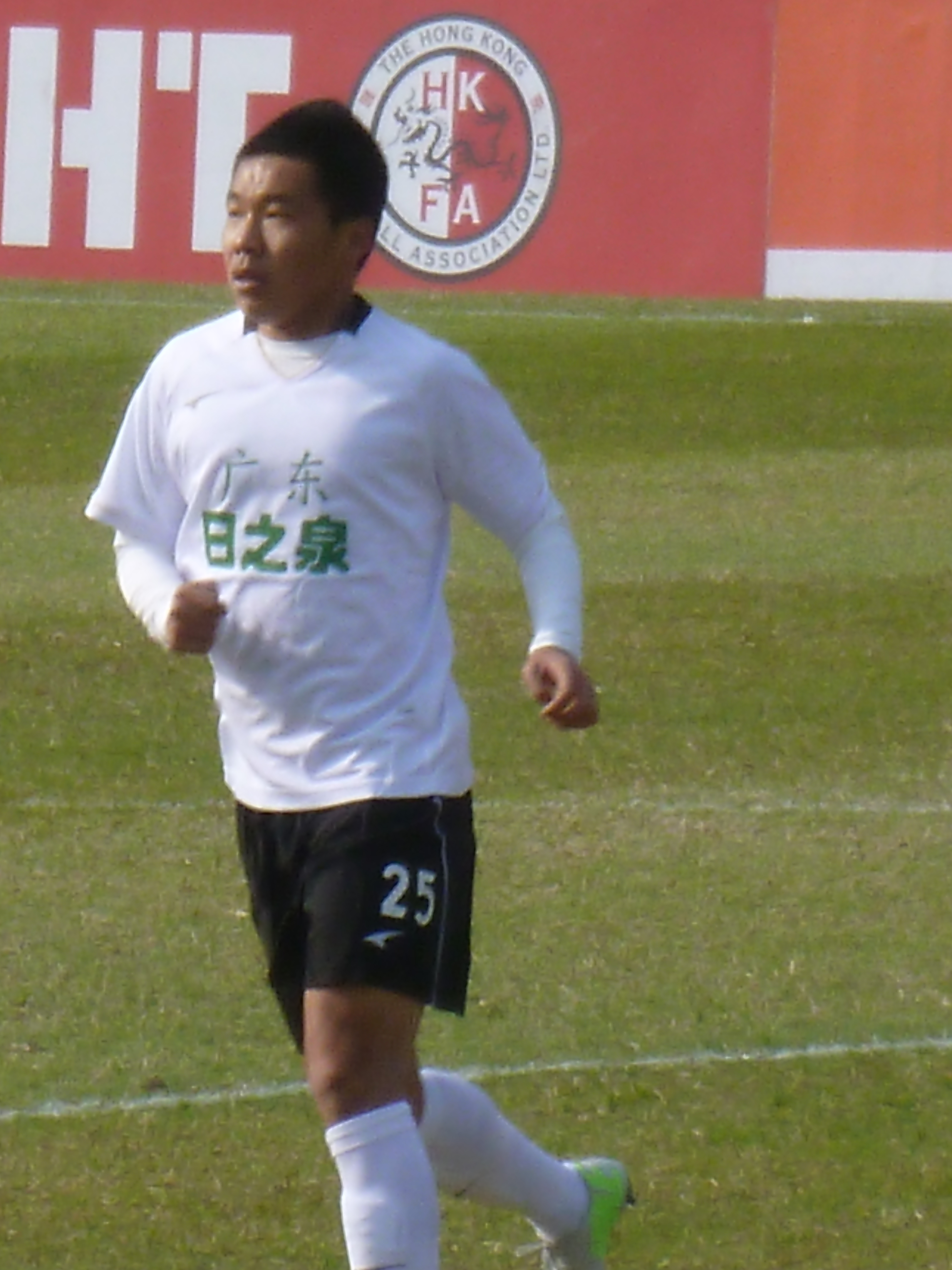

Personal information
- Date of birth: 4 October 1988 (age 38)
- Place of birth: Shenyang, Liaoning, China
- Height: 1.78 m (5 ft 10 in)
- Position: Midfielder

Team information
- Current team: Liaoning Tieren
- Number: 25

Youth career
- Shenzhen FC

Senior career*
Years	Team	Apps	(Gls)
2006–2008	Shenzhen FC	5	(0)
2012	Shenzhen Fengpeng	28	(7)
2013	Guangdong Sunray Cave	28	(1)
2014–2015	Guizhou Zhicheng	25	(5)
2016–	Liaoning Tieren	229	(37)

International career
2004–2005	China U-17		
Medal record
Representing China
Men's football
AFC U-17 Championship
Gold medal – first place	2004 Japan	Team
- * Club domestic league appearances and goals as of 8 November 2025

Yang Jian (simplified Chinese: 杨健; traditional Chinese: 楊健; pinyin: Yáng Jiàn; born 4 October 1988, in Shenyang) is a Chinese footballer who currently plays for China League One side Liaoning Tieren as a defensive midfielder.

== Club career ==
Yang started his professional career in 2006 when he was promoted to Chinese Super League side Shenzhen Kingway first team squad. On 15 September 2007, he made his senior debut in a 5–0 away defeat against Shandong Luneng Taishan. Yang played 5 matches for Shenzhen in the 2007 season. However, he lost his position in 2008 and was put on the transfer list at the end of 2008 season.

Yang returned to play professional football in 2012 when he joined China League Two club Shenzhen Fengpeng which was newly founded by former Shenzhen F.C. players and staffs. He scored 7 goals in 28 appearances in the 2012 season while Shenzhen Fengpeng was knocked out in the semi-finals of play-offs by Hubei China-Kyle and failed to promote to second tier.

Yang transferred to China League One club Guangdong Sunray Cave with Shenzhen Fengpeng's manager Zhang Jun in January 2013. On 16 March, he made his debut for Guangdong Sunray Cave in the first round of the league which Guangdong beat Chengdu Blades 2–1 at home. He scored his first goal for Guangdong on 28 April, in a 1–0 away victory against Beijing Baxy.

In January 2016, Yang transferred to his hometown club Shenyang City in the China League Two. He would go on to win the 2019 China League Two division with the club.

== International career ==
Yang was part of the China national under-17 football team to win the 2004 AFC U-17 Championship. He also played for China U-17s in the 2005 FIFA U-17 World Championship.

== Career statistics ==
Statistics accurate as of match played 8 November 2025.

Club	Season	League			National Cup		Continental		Other		Total	
Club	Season	Division	Apps	Goals	Apps	Goals	Apps	Goals	Apps	Goals	Apps	Goals
Shenzhen FC	2006	Chinese Super League	0	0	0	0	-		-		0	0
Shenzhen FC	2007	Chinese Super League	5	0	-		-		-		5	0
Shenzhen FC	2008	Chinese Super League	0	0	-		-		-		0	0
Shenzhen FC	Total		5	0	0	0	0	0	0	0	5	0
Shenzhen Fengpeng	2012	China League Two	28	7	-		-		-		28	7
Guangdong Sunray Cave	2013	China League One	28	1	2	0	-		-		30	1
Guizhou Zhicheng	2014	China League Two	21	5	0	0	-		-		21	5
Guizhou Zhicheng	2015	China League One	4	0	2	1	-		-		6	1
Guizhou Zhicheng	Total		25	5	2	1	0	0	0	0	27	6
Shenyang Urban	2016	China League Two	19	9	2	1	-		-		21	10
Shenyang Urban	2017	China League Two	20	4	1	0	-		-		21	4
Shenyang Urban	2018	China League Two	23	4	4	1	-		-		27	5
Shenyang Urban	2019	China League Two	31	4	1	0	-		-		32	4
Shenyang Urban	2020	China League One	15	3	-		-		-		15	3
Shenyang Urban	2021	China League One	33	7	0	0	-		-		33	7
Shenyang Urban	2022	China League One	32	0	0	0	-		-		32	0
Shenyang Urban	2023	China League One	29	2	0	0	-		-		29	2
Shenyang Urban	2024	China League One	25	4	0	0	-		-		25	4
Shenyang Urban	2025	China League One	2	1	0	0	-		-		3	0
Shenyang Urban	Total		229	37	9	2	0	0	0	0	238	39
Career total			315	50	13	3	0	0	0	0	328	53

== Honours ==
=== Club ===
Shenyang Urban

- China League Two: 2019

=== International ===
China under-17 national football team

- AFC U-17 Championship: 2004
