= 2016 China League One =

China League One
- Season: 2016
- Champions: Tianjin Quanjian
- Promoted: Tianjin Quanjian; Guizhou Hengfeng Zhicheng
- Relegated: Qingdao Jonoon; Hunan Billows
- Matches: 240
- Goals: 647 (2.7 per match)
- Top goalscorer: (Brazil) Luís Fabiano (22 goals)
- Biggest home win: Meizhou Hakka 6–0 Hunan Billows (Apr. 16th, 2016) (6 goals)
- Biggest away win: Dalian Transcendence 0–4 Shanghai Shenxin (Jul. 3rd, 2016); Hunan Billows 1–5 Zhejiang Yiteng (Aug. 13th, 2016) (4 goals)
- Highest scoring: Shanghai Shenxin 5–3 Meizhou Hakka (Sept. 11th, 2016) (8 goals)
- Highest attendance: 30,568; Guizhou Hengfeng Zhicheng 1–1 Meizhou Hakka (Mar. 13th, 2016)
- Lowest attendance: 0 Hunan Billows 1–1 Meizhou Hakka (Jul. 30th, 2016)
- Average attendance: 6,220

The 2016 China League One (Chinese: 58同城2016中国足球协会甲级联赛) was the 13th season of the China League One, the second tier of the Chinese football league pyramid, since its establishment in 2004. The league's title sponsor is the e-commerce website 58.com.

== Teams ==
A total of 16 teams are contesting in the league, including 12 sides from the 2015 season, two relegated from the 2015 Chinese Super League and two promoted from the 2015 China League Two.

=== Team changes ===
==== To League One ====
Teams relegated from 2015 Chinese Super League

- Shanghai Shenxin
- Guizhou Renhe

Teams promoted from 2015 China League Two

- Meizhou Kejia
- Dalian Transcendence

==== From League One ====
Teams promoted to 2016 Chinese Super League

- Yanbian Changbaishan
- Hebei China Fortune

Teams relegated to 2016 China League Two

- Beijing BIT
- Jiangxi Liansheng

=== Name changes ===
- Tianjin Songjiang F.C. changed their name to Tianjin Quanjian F.C. in December 2015.
- Dalian Aerbin F.C. changed their name to Dalian Yifang F.C. in December 2015.
- Qingdao Hainiu F.C. changed their name to Qingdao Huanghai F.C. in December 2015.
- Guizhou Zhicheng F.C. changed their name to Guizhou Hengfeng Zhicheng F.C. in January 2016.
- Meizhou Kejia F.C. changed their name to Meizhou Hakka F.C. in January 2016.
- Guizhou Renhe F.C. moved to the city of Beijing and changed their name to Beijing Renhe F.C. in January 2016.
- Harbin Yiteng moved to the city of Shaoxing and changed their name to Zhejiang Yiteng F.C. in January 2016.

== Clubs ==
=== Stadiums and Locations ===
Club	Team name	Head coach	City	Stadium	Capacity	2015 season
Beijing Renhe F.C. ^{R}	Beijing Renhe	(China) Wang Baoshan	Beijing	Beijing Fengtai Stadium	31,043	CSL, 15th
Shanghai Shenxin F.C. ^{R}	Shanghai Shenxin	(England) Gary White	Shanghai	Jinshan Football Stadium	30,000	CSL, 16th
Dalian Yifang F.C.	Dalian Yifang	(Spain) Sergio Piernas Cárdenas	Dalian	Dalian Sports Center	61,000	3rd
Beijing Enterprises Group F.C.	Beijing BG Yanjing	(Serbia) Aleksandar Stanojević	Beijing	Olympic Sports Centre (Beijing)	36,228	4th
Zhejiang Yiteng F.C.	Zhejiang Yiteng Textile City	(China) Duan Xin (caretaker)	Shaoxing	Shaoxing China Textile City Sports Center	40,000	5th
Nei Mongol Zhongyou F.C.	Hohhot Zhongyou	(China) Wang Bo	Hohhot	Hohhot City Stadium	60,000	6th
Qingdao Jonoon F.C.	Qingdao Jonoon	(China) Yin Tiesheng	Qingdao	Qingdao Tiantai Stadium	20,525	7th
Xinjiang Tianshan Leopard F.C.	Xinjiang Sports Lottery	(China) Li Jun	Ürümqi	Xinjiang Sports Centre	50,000	8th
Tianjin Quanjian F.C.	Tianjin Quanjian	(Italy) Fabio Cannavaro	Tianjin	Haihe Educational Football Stadium	30,000	9th
Wuhan Zall F.C.	Wuhan Zall	(Italy) Ciro Ferrara	Wuhan	Xinhua Road Sports Center	32,137	10th
Qingdao Huanghai F.C.	Qingdao Huanghai	(Spain) Jordi Vinyals	Qingdao	Conson Stadium	45,000	11th
Shenzhen F.C.	Shenzhen Kaisa	(Netherlands) Clarence Seedorf	Shenzhen	Shenzhen Stadium	32,500	12th
Guizhou Hengfeng Zhicheng F.C.	Guizhou Hengfeng Zhicheng	(China) Li Bing (caretaker)	Guiyang	Guiyang Olympic Sports Center	51,636	13th
Hunan Billows F.C.	Hunan Billows Hualai	(China) Huang Xiangdong (caretaker)	Changsha (playing in Yiyang)	Yiyang Olympic Sports Park Stadium	30,000	14th
Meizhou Hakka ^{P}	Meizhou Hakka	(China) Cao Yang (caretaker)	Wuhua	Wuhua County Stadium	15,000	CL2, 1st
Dalian Transcendence F.C. ^{P}	Dalian Transcendence	(Bosnia and Herzegovina) Rusmir Cviko (caretaker)	Dalian	Jinzhou Stadium	30,776	CL2, 2nd

Location of teams in 2016 China League One

=== Managerial changes ===
Club	Outgoing manager	Date of vacancy	Incoming manager	Date of appointment
Tianjin Quanjian	(Croatia) Goran Tomić	1 November 2015	(Brazil) Vanderlei Luxemburgo	1 November 2015
Hunan Billows	(North Macedonia) Žikica Tasevski (caretaker)	1 November 2015	(Slovenia) Tomaž Kavčič	30 November 2015
Shanghai Shenxin	(China) Liu Junwei	4 December 2015	(South Korea) Kim Sang-ho	4 December 2015
Beijing Renhe	(China) Gong Lei	8 December 2015	(China) Wang Baoshan	8 December 2015
Shenzhen F.C.	(Hong Kong) Li Haiqiang (caretaker)	9 December 2015	(China) Tang Yaodong	9 December 2015
Qingdao Jonoon	(Serbia) Dragan Stančić (caretaker)	15 December 2015	(China) Su Maozhen	15 December 2015
Qingdao Huanghai	(China) Sun Xinbo (caretaker)	28 December 2015	(Spain) Jordi Vinyals	28 December 2015
Meizhou Hakka	(China) Qi Wusheng	31 December 2015	(Netherlands) Luc Nijholt	1 January 2016
Zhejiang Yiteng	(China) Duan Xin	31 December 2015	(Croatia) Goran Tomić	1 January 2016
Zhejiang Yiteng	(Croatia) Goran Tomić	22 March 2016	(China) Duan Xin (caretaker)	22 March 2016
Guizhou Zhicheng	(China) Chen Mao	7 April 2016	(China) Li Bing (caretaker)	7 April 2016
Dalian Transcendence	(China) Liu Zhongchang	13 April 2016	(China) Sun Feng (caretaker)	15 April 2016
Dalian Transcendence	(China) Sun Feng (caretaker)	21 April 2016	(Slovenia) Ermin Šiljak	21 April 2016
Hunan Billows	(Slovenia) Tomaž Kavčič	28 May 2016	(China) Huang Xiangdong (caretaker)	28 May 2016
Shanghai Shenxin	(South Korea) Kim Sang-ho	30 May 2016	(England) Gary White	30 May 2016
Tianjin Quanjian	(Brazil) Vanderlei Luxemburgo	5 June 2016	(Italy) Fabio Cannavaro	9 June 2016
Wuhan Zall	(China) Zheng Xiong	26 June 2016	(Italy) Ciro Ferrara	5 July 2016
Dalian Yifang	(Sweden) Mikael Stahre	5 July 2016	(Serbia) Milinko Pantić	5 July 2016
Shenzhen F.C.	(China) Tang Yaodong	7 July 2016	(Netherlands) Clarence Seedorf	7 July 2016
Meizhou Hakka	(Netherlands) Luc Nijholt	19 July 2016	(China) Cao Yang (caretaker)	19 July 2016
Dalian Transcendence	(Slovenia) Ermin Šiljak	10 August 2016	(Belgium) Rusmir Cviko (caretaker)	10 August 2016
Dalian Yifang	(Serbia) Milinko Pantić	31 August 2016	(Spain) Sergio Piernas Cárdenas	31 August 2016
Qingdao Jonoon	(China) Su Maozhen	6 September 2016	(China) Yin Tiesheng	6 September 2016

=== Foreign players ===
The number of foreign players is limited to three per CL1 team. Teams can use three foreign players on the field each game.

Players name in bold indicates the player is registered during the mid-season transfer window.

Club	Player 1	Player 2	Player 3	Former Players ^{1}
Beijing Enterprises Group	(Austria) **Rubin Okotie**	(Montenegro) Nikola Vujadinović	(Nigeria) Leke James	(Colombia) Carmelo Valencia
Beijing Renhe	(Bosnia and Herzegovina) Zvjezdan Misimović	(Croatia) Nikica Jelavić	(Sweden) **Guillermo Molins**	(Bosnia and Herzegovina) Sejad Salihović
Dalian Yifang	(Liberia) **Sekou Oliseh**	(Sierra Leone) Mohamed Bangura	(Zimbabwe) Nyasha Mushekwi	(Romania) Constantin Budescu
Dalian Transcendence	(Brazil) Jaílton Paraíba	(Brazil) **William Paulista**	(Sweden) David Fällman	(Kosovo) Erton Fejzullahu
Guizhou Zhicheng	(Brazil) Mazola	(Cameroon) Yves Ekwalla Herman	(Spain) Ibán Cuadrado	
Hunan Billows	(Colombia) Luis Carlos Cabezas	(Israel) **Toto Tamuz**	(Slovenia) Rok Elsner	(Colombia) Jhon Valoy
Meizhou Hakka	(Brazil) Japa	(Gabon) Merlin Tandjigora	(Sierra Leone) Gibril Sankoh	
Nei Mongol Zhongyou	(Brazil) Dori	(Senegal) **André Senghor**	(Serbia) Nenad Milijas	(Australia) Jonas Salley
Qingdao Huanghai	(Brazil) Yuri	(Serbia) Đorđe Rakić	(Spain) Martí Crespí	
Qingdao Jonoon	(Brazil) Johnny	(Nigeria) Chigozie Udoji	(Honduras) Eddie Hernández	
Shanghai Shenxin	(Brazil) Biro-Biro	(Brazil) **Davi**	(Nigeria) Daniel Chima	(Serbia) Nikola Mitrović
Shenzhen F.C.	(Cameroon) Aboubakar Oumarou	(France) Helton	(Jamaica) **Deshorn Brown**	(Senegal) Babacar Gueye
Tianjin Quanjian	(Brazil) Luís Fabiano	(Brazil) Geuvânio	(Brazil) Jadson	
Wuhan Zall	(Costa Rica) Michael Barrantes	(Iceland) Sölvi Ottesen	(Liberia) **Sam Johnson**	(Brazil) Guto
Xinjiang Tianshan Leopard	(Bosnia and Herzegovina) Nusmir Fajić	(Brazil) Rudnei	(Brazil) Vicente	
Zhejiang Yiteng	(Australia) Adam Hughes	(Brazil) Rodrigo	(Colombia) Ricardo Steer	

- **^1**Foreign players who left their clubs or were sent to reverse team after the first half of the season.

Hong Kong/Macau/Taiwan outfield players (Contracts signed before 1 January 2016 do not count for the foreign player slot):

Club	Player 1	Player 2
Beijing Enterprises Group	(Chinese Taipei) Chen Hao-wei	(Chinese Taipei) Wen Chih-hao
Guizhou Zhicheng	(Hong Kong) Au Yeung Yiu Chung	(Hong Kong) Festus Baise
Hunan Billows	(Chinese Taipei) Chen Chao-an	
Meizhou Hakka	(Chinese Taipei) Onur Dogan	(Hong Kong) Lee Chi Ho
Qingdao Huanghai	(Hong Kong) Godfred Karikari	
Shenzhen F.C.	(Hong Kong) Paulinho	
Tianjin Quanjian	(Hong Kong) Jean-Jacques Kilama	(Hong Kong) Ng Wai Chiu
Xinjiang Tianshan Leopard	(Hong Kong) Itaparica	

== League table ==
Pos	Team	Pld	W	D	L	GF	GA	GD	Pts	Promotion, qualification or relegation
1	Tianjin Quanjian (C, P)	30	18	5	7	61	27	+34	59 (Note: Head-to-head points: Tianjin Quanjian 9 pts, Guizhou Hengfeng Zhicheng 6 pts, Qingdao Huanghai 3 pts.)	Promotion to Super League
2	Guizhou Hengfeng Zhicheng (P)	30	18	5	7	48	27	+21	59	Promotion to Super League
3	Qingdao Huanghai	30	19	2	9	52	42	+10	59	
4	Beijing Renhe	30	15	4	11	49	35	+14	49	
5	Dalian Yifang	30	14	3	13	43	44	−1	45	
6	Wuhan Zall	30	12	7	11	31	33	−2	43	
7	Nei Mongol Zhongyou	30	12	5	13	37	35	+2	41 (Note: Head-to-head results: Nei Mongol 1–0 Beijing Enterprises Group, Beijing Enterprises Group 0–0 Nei Mongol.)	
8	Beijing Enterprises Group	30	11	8	11	40	38	+2	41	
9	Shenzhen F.C.	30	11	7	12	36	43	−7	40 (Note: Head-to-head results: Shenzhen 4–2 Shanghai Shenxin, Shanghai Shenxin 1–1 Shenzhen.)	
10	Shanghai Shenxin	30	12	4	14	54	48	+6	40	
11	Xinjiang Tianshan Leopard	30	11	6	13	31	36	−5	39 (Note: Head-to-head results: Xinjiang 1–0 Meizhou, Meizhou 1–1 Xinjiang.)	
12	Meizhou Hakka	30	11	6	13	48	50	−2	39	
13	Zhejiang Yiteng	30	11	5	14	39	49	−10	38 (Note: Head-to-head results: Zhejiang 1–0 Dalian Transcendence, Dalian Transcendence 2–2 Zhejiang.)	
14	Dalian Transcendence	30	10	8	12	32	36	−4	38	
15	Qingdao Jonoon (R)	30	8	9	13	30	43	−13	33	Relegation to League Two
16	Hunan Billows (R)	30	2	6	22	16	61	−45	12	Relegation to League Two

Updated to match(es) played on 22 October 2016. Source: sports.sina.com
Rules for classification: 1) Points; 2) Head-to-head points; 3) Head-to-head goal difference; 4) Head-to-head goals scored; 5) Goal difference; 6) Goals scored; 7) Disciplinary points (1 point for each yellow card, 3 points for each red card)
(C) Champions; (P) Promoted; (R) Relegated

== Results ==
Home \ Away	BJR	SHS	DLY	BG	ZJY	NMZ	QD	XJT	TJQ	WH	QDH	SZ	GZZ	HUN	MZH	DLT
Beijing Renhe		3–1	2–0	2–1	4–1	1–0	2–0	2–1	1–3	1–0	5–0	2–0	1–2	3–0	3–3	3–1
Shanghai Shenxin	2–1		2–3	4–1	1–2	2–0	5–0	1–2	3–2	0–0	3–0	1–1	0–3	3–1	5–3	1–3
Dalian Yifang	1–3	4–3		1–1	2–0	2–0	0–1	1–0	2–1	4–0	1–3	2–0	2–0	0–2	2–0	1–2
Beijing Enterprises Group	1–0	2–2	3–0		2–0	1–1	1–1	1–0	0–1	4–2	1–2	0–3	0–2	1–0	4–2	2–0
Zhejiang Yiteng	1–0	1–0	2–3	0–1		2–2	2–3	0–1	2–5	1–2	2–0	2–2	1–4	2–0	2–2	1–0
Nei Mongol Zhongyou	1–2	2–1	1–0	1–0	0–1		1–1	4–1	0–0	2–1	0–3	3–0	4–2	2–0	3–2	4–0
Qingdao Jonoon	0–0	0–1	1–1	3–3	0–1	1–0		1–0	3–2	2–1	0–1	0–1	1–3	1–0	4–1	0–0
Xinjiang Tianshan Leopard	2–1	2–0	2–1	1–0	0–1	0–0	2–2		0–3	3–1	1–2	1–0	1–2	2–0	1–0	0–0
Tianjin Quanjian	0–0	1–2	2–1	1–2	4–0	2–0	1–1	1–0		1–0	5–1	0–1	2–1	1–1	3–0	2–0
Wuhan Zall	1–2	1–3	4–0	1–1	1–0	1–0	2–1	1–1	1–1		1–0	2–0	1–0	2–1	1–1	1–0
Qingdao Huanghai	4–1	2–1	5–2	2–1	2–1	1–0	3–2	3–2	0–3	0–0		2–0	3–1	3–1	1–1	2–0
Shenzhen F.C.	2–1	4–2	0–1	1–1	2–2	1–3	2–1	2–1	2–5	2–1	2–1		1–2	2–1	2–0	0–0
Guizhou Hengfeng Zhicheng	2–1	2–0	0–0	1–1	1–2	1–0	3–0	0–1	2–1	2–0	2–0	3–1		0–0	1–1	1–1
Hunan Billows	0–0	0–0	0–2	0–3	1–5	0–1	2–0	2–2	0–3	0–1	1–4	1–1	0–2		0–2	1–4
Meizhou Hakka	2–1	2–1	4–2	2–1	2–0	4–2	2–0	1–1	1–3	0–1	1–0	2–1	0–1	6–0		1–2
Dalian Transcendence	3–1	0–4	0–2	2–0	2–2	2–0	0–0	3–0	0–2	0–0	1–2	0–0	1–2	3–1	2–0	

Updated to match(es) played on 22 October 2016. Source: sports.sina.com
Legend: Blue = home team win; Yellow = draw; Red = away team win.

== Positions by round ==
Team ╲ Round	1	2	3	4	5	6	7	8	9	10	11	12	13	14	15	16	17	18	19	20	21	22	23	24	25	26	27	28	29	30
Tianjin Quanjian	1	1	1	1	1	1	2	4	6	8	8	8	7	7	5	4	3	2	3	2	2	1	1	3	3	2	1	1	1	1
Guizhou Hengfeng Zhicheng	6	14	15	12	11	9	6	5	4	2	2	2	2	2	2	2	1	1	1	1	1	2	2	1	1	3	2	2	2	2
Qingdao Huanghai	16	9	12	8	6	3	1	1	1	1	1	1	1	1	1	1	4	4	2	3	3	3	3	2	2	1	3	3	3	3
Beijing Renhe	10	13	8	4	3	4	3	2	3	3	3	4	6	4	6	5	5	5	6	7	5	6	6	4	4	4	4	4	4	4
Dalian Yifang	3	7	11	3	2	2	4	3	2	4	4	3	3	3	3	3	2	3	5	6	4	4	5	6	6	5	5	5	5	5
Wuhan Zall	6	11	7	9	7	8	7	9	12	12	12	12	13	12	11	12	10	10	10	11	11	14	15	12	13	13	13	10	7	6
Nei Mongol Zhongyou	13	15	16	16	16	16	16	16	16	16	15	15	15	15	15	15	14	11	14	12	13	12	12	14	14	14	14	14	12	7
Beijing Enterprises Group	6	5	5	9	9	7	11	8	5	9	5	7	9	9	8	6	7	7	4	5	8	8	8	8	7	7	6	6	6	8
Shenzhen F.C.	4	2	2	2	4	5	5	6	7	6	6	5	4	5	7	8	6	6	7	4	7	7	7	7	8	8	8	8	8	9
Shanghai Shenxin	14	6	9	5	8	10	12	12	11	13	13	14	14	14	14	13	13	15	13	15	12	11	11	11	11	11	9	11	13	10
Xinjiang Tianshan Leopard	12	12	14	15	13	14	14	14	13	11	11	10	10	10	9	9	8	8	8	8	6	5	4	5	5	6	7	7	9	11
Meizhou Hakka	6	10	5	6	5	6	10	11	10	10	10	9	8	8	10	10	11	12	11	10	9	10	9	10	9	9	11	13	10	12
Zhejiang Yiteng	15	16	13	14	15	12	9	10	9	7	7	6	5	6	4	7	9	9	9	9	10	9	10	9	10	10	12	9	11	13
Dalian Transcendence	2	3	9	13	14	15	13	13	14	14	14	13	12	13	13	14	15	14	12	14	14	13	13	13	12	12	10	12	14	14
Qingdao Jonoon	5	7	3	7	10	11	8	7	8	5	9	11	11	11	12	11	12	13	15	13	15	15	14	15	15	15	15	15	15	15
Hunan Billows	10	4	4	9	12	13	15	15	15	15	16	16	16	16	16	16	16	16	16	16	16	16	16	16	16	16	16	16	16	16

Winner; promote to Super League
Runner-up; promote to Super League
Relegate to League Two

Source: Table by round (in Chinese)

== Goalscorers ==
=== Top scorers ===
Rank	Player	Club	Total
1	(Brazil) Luís Fabiano	Tianjin Quanjian	22
2	(Zimbabwe) Nyasha Mushekwi	Dalian Yifang	20
3	(Brazil) Biro-Biro	Shanghai Shenxin	18
4	(Brazil) Japa	Meizhou Hakka	17
5	(Brazil) Jaílton Paraíba	Dalian Transcendence	12
5	(Croatia) Nikica Jelavić	Beijing Renhe	12
7	(Brazil) Mazola	Guizhou Zhicheng	11
7	(Brazil) Rodrigo	Zhejiang Yiteng	11
7	(Cameroon) Aboubakar Oumarou	Shenzhen F.C.	11
7	(Nigeria) Leke James	Beijing Enterprises Group	11
11	(Colombia) Ricardo Steer	Zhejiang Yiteng	10
11	(Serbia) Đorđe Rakić	Qingdao Huanghai	10

Last updated: 22 October 2016
Source: sina.com.cn

=== Hat-tricks ===
Player	For	Against	Result	Date	Ref
(Brazil) Luís Fabiano	Tianjin Quanjian	Zhejiang Yiteng	5–2	19 March 2016	
(Serbia) Đorđe Rakić	Qingdao Huanghai	Xinjiang Tianshan Leopard	3–2	10 April 2016	
(Nigeria) Leke James	Beijing Enterprises Group	Meizhou Hakka	4–2	24 April 2016	
(Jamaica) Deshorn Brown	Shenzhen F.C.	Shanghai Shenxin	4–2	16 July 2016	
(Zimbabwe) Nyasha Mushekwi	Dalian Yifang	Shanghai Shenxin	4–3	21 August 2016	
(Brazil) Biro-Biro	Shanghai Shenxin	Meizhou Hakka	5–3	11 September 2016	
(Senegal) André Senghor	Nei Mongol Zhongyou	Dalian Transcendence	4–0	24 September 2016	
(Croatia) Nikica Jelavić	Beijing Renhe	Zhejiang Yiteng	4–1	22 October 2016	

== Awards ==
The awards of 2016 China League One were announced on 9 November 2016.

- China League One Most valuable player: (Brazil) Luís Fabiano (Tianjin Quanjian)
- China League One Top scorer: (Brazil) Luís Fabiano (Tianjin Quanjian)
- China League One Best goalkeeper: Zhang Lu (Tianjin Quanjian)
- China League One Young Player of the Year: Ming Tian (Wuhan Zall)
- China League One Best coach: Li Bing (Guizhou Hengfeng Zhicheng)

== League Attendance ==
Pos	Team	Total	High	Low	Average	Change
1	Tianjin Quanjian	182,475	20,688	6,887	12,165	+65.1%
2	Guizhou Hengfeng Zhicheng	166,340	30,568	5,123	11,089	+492.7%
3	Dalian Yifang	162,088	20,392	2,532	10,806	−29.0%
4	Shenzhen F.C.	152,273	20,801	5,081	10,152	−12.2%
5	Nei Mongol Zhongyou	142,018	17,833	4,328	9,468	−48.1%
6	Qingdao Huanghai	104,881	18,697	1,916	6,992	+33.5%
7	Meizhou Hakka^{‡}	96,757	9,900	3,832	6,450	−2.7%
8	Wuhan Zall	71,795	8,316	2,653	4,786	−9.7%
9	Beijing Renhe^{†}	68,123	8,358	2,601	4,542	−70.0%
10	Dalian Transcendence^{‡}	65,252	17,721	1,821	4,350	+384.4%
11	Shanghai Shenxin^{†}	57,245	8,690	1,038	3,816	−45.7%
12	Hunan Billows	56,712	15,650	0	3,781	−21.1%
13	Beijing Enterprises Group	51,939	6,948	1,985	3,463	−36.3%
14	Qingdao Jonoon	40,526	10,912	1,022	2,702	−50.3%
15	Xinjiang Tianshan Leopard	39,226	5,531	1,352	2,615	−36.4%
16	Zhejiang Yiteng	35,269	8,541	303	2,351	−88.5%
	League total	1,492,919	30,568	0	6,220	−30.9%

Updated to games played on 2016-10-22
Source: Worldfootball.net
Notes:
^{†} Teams played previous season in CSL.
^{‡} Teams played previous season in CL2.
