= Exmetjan Ekber =

Uyghur-Chinese footballer

Personal information
- Full name: Exmetjan Ekber
- Date of birth: 17 January 1993 (age 33)
- Place of birth: Kashgar, Xinjiang, China
- Height: 1.73 m (5 ft 8 in)
- Position: Midfielder

Youth career
- Xinjiang Youth
- 2014: Xinjiang Tianshan Leopard

Senior career*
Years	Team	Apps	(Gls)
2012–2013	Xinjiang Begonia	22	(3)
2015–2017	Yanbian Funde	7	(1)
2018–2019	Nei Mongol Zhongyou	15	(0)
- * Club domestic league appearances and goals as of 31 December 2019

Exmetjan Ekber
- Simplified Chinese: 艾合买江·艾克拜尔
Transcriptions
Standard Mandarin
- Hanyu Pinyin: Àihémǎijiāng Àikèbàiěr
- IPA: [âɪ xɤ̌ màɪ tɕjáŋ.âɪ kʰɤ̂ pâɪ.ɚ̀]

Exmetjan Ekber (born 17 January 1993) is a Chinese footballer.

== Club career ==
Exmetjan started his professional football career in 2012 when he was promoted to China League Two side Xinjiang Begonia's squad. He scored three goals in twenty-two appearances in the 2012 season. However, he became an unattached player after Xinjiang quit from the league in 2013 due to financial difficulties. He was included China League One club Xinjiang Tianshan Leopard's reserve team squad in 2014.

Exmetjan was signed by China League One side Yanbian Changbaishan on 28 February 2015 after a successful trial. He made his debut for Yanbian on 16 April 2015 in a 2015 Chinese FA Cup match against amateur team Suzhou Jinfu. He played just one minute in the 2015 China League One as Yanbian won the title of the league and promoted to the first tier. On 16 July 2016, Exmetjan made his Super League debut in a 3–0 home victory against Jiangsu Suning, coming on for Jin Bo in the 76th minute. He scored his first goal for Yanbian one minute after his substitution.

On 22 February 2018, Exmetjan transferred to China League One club Nei Mongol Zhongyou following the relegation of Yanbian Funde.

== Career statistics ==
Statistics accurate as of match played 31 December 2019.

Appearances and goals by club, season and competition
Club	Season	League			National Cup		Continental		Other		Total	
Club	Season	Division	Apps	Goals	Apps	Goals	Apps	Goals	Apps	Goals	Apps	Goals
Xinjiang Begonia	2012	China League Two	22	3	-		-		-		22	3
Xinjiang Begonia	2013	-	-		2	0	-		-		2	0
Xinjiang Begonia	Total		22	3	2	0	0	0	0	0	24	3
Yanbian Funde	2015	China League One	1	0	1	0	-		-		2	0
Yanbian Funde	2016	Chinese Super League	4	1	1	0	-		-		5	1
Yanbian Funde	2017	Chinese Super League	2	0	1	0	-		-		3	0
Yanbian Funde	Total		7	1	3	0	0	0	0	0	10	1
Nei Mongol Zhongyou	2018	China League One	15	0	1	0	-		-		16	0
Nei Mongol Zhongyou	2019	China League One	0	0	1	1	-		-		1	1
Nei Mongol Zhongyou	Total		15	0	2	1	0	0	0	0	17	1
Career total			44	4	7	1	0	0	0	0	51	5

== Honours ==
Yanbian FC

- China League One: 2015
