= Jiang Liang =

Chinese footballer

Jiang Liang 蒋亮
Personal information
- Full name: Jiang Liang
- Date of birth: 4 November 1989 (age 37)
- Place of birth: Guiyang, Guizhou, China
- Height: 1.79 m (5 ft 10 1/2 in)
- Position: Right-back

Youth career
- Guizhou Zhicheng

Senior career*
Years	Team	Apps	(Gls)
2008–2021	Guizhou Zhicheng	243	(11)
- * Club domestic league appearances and goals as of 31 December 2020

Jiang Liang (simplified Chinese: 蒋亮; traditional Chinese: 蔣亮; pinyin: Jiǎng Liàng; born 4 November 1989) is a Chinese footballer.

== Club career ==
Jiang Liang joined his hometown club Guizhou Zhicheng in 2008. He played 29 matches for Guizhou with the highest tackling rate in the league in 2016 as Guizhou Zhicheng won promotion to Chinese Super League. He extended his contract with the club on 14 January 2017. Jiang made his Super League debut on 3 March 2017 in a 1–1 home draw against Liaoning FC. On 28 April 2017, Jiang was sent off in a league match against Guangzhou R&F. He was sent off again five days later by roughly tackling Cleiton Silva in the 2017 Chinese FA Cup against Shanghai Shenxin. On 4 May 2017, Jiang's captaincy was stripped and received a ban of four matches as well as degraded to the reserve team by the club. His ban was officially canceled on 15 May 2017 for his positive attitude in the reserve team.

== Career statistics ==
As of 31 December 2020.

Appearances and goals by club, season and competition
Club	Season	League			National Cup		Continental		Other		Total	
Club	Season	Division	Apps	Goals	Apps	Goals	Apps	Goals	Apps	Goals	Apps	Goals
Guizhou Zhicheng	2008	China League Two	16	2	-		-		-		16	2
Guizhou Zhicheng	2009	China League Two	13	1	-		-		-		13	1
Guizhou Zhicheng	2010	China League Two	20	1	-		-		-		20	1
Guizhou Zhicheng	2011	China League One	18	1	1	0	-		-		19	1
Guizhou Zhicheng	2012	China League Two	24	4	2	1	-		-		26	5
Guizhou Zhicheng	2013	China League One	26	1	0	0	-		-		26	1
Guizhou Zhicheng	2014	China League Two	16	0	2	0	-		-		18	0
Guizhou Zhicheng	2015	China League One	25	1	0	0	-		-		25	1
Guizhou Zhicheng	2016	China League One	29	0	0	0	-		-		29	0
Guizhou Zhicheng	2017	Chinese Super League	20	0	1	0	-		-		21	0
Guizhou Zhicheng	2018	Chinese Super League	15	0	3	0	-		-		18	0
Guizhou Zhicheng	2019	China League One	16	0	1	0	-		-		17	0
Guizhou Zhicheng	2020	China League One	5	0	1	0	-		-		6	0
Guizhou Zhicheng	Total		243	11	11	1	0	0	0	0	254	12
Career total			243	11	11	1	0	0	0	0	254	12

== Honours ==
=== Club ===
Guizhou Zhicheng

- China League Two: 2012
