= Yerjet Yerzat =

Chinese footballer

Personal information
- Date of birth: 4 January 1993 (age 33)
- Place of birth: Tacheng, Xinjiang, China
- Height: 1.83 m (6 ft 0 in)
- Position: Goalkeeper

Team information
- Current team: Chongqing Tonglianglong
- Number: 25

Youth career
- 2005–2008: Xinjiang Song Qingling Football School
- 2008–2011: Xinjiang Youth

Senior career*
Years	Team	Apps	(Gls)
2012–2013	Xinjiang Begonia	23	(0)
2014–2016	Gondomar	30	(0)
2016–2017	Paços de Ferreira	0	(0)
2017–2018	Leixões	1	(0)
2018	Salgueiros	11	(0)
2018–2019	Gondomar	21	(0)
2019–2022	Chongqing Lifan	7	(0)
2022–2023	Heilongjiang Ice City	36	(0)
2024	Qingdao West Coast	3	(0)
2025–	Chongqing Tonglianglong	0	(0)
2025	→ Hubei Istar (loan)	10	(0)

International career
2013–2016	China U22		
- * Club domestic league appearances and goals as of 31 December 2022

Yerjet Yerzat (Chinese: 叶尔杰提·叶尔扎提, Kazakh: Ержет Ерзат; born 4 January 1993), also known as Jet in Portugal, is a Chinese professional footballer who plays as a goalkeeper for Chinese Super League club Chongqing Tonglianglong.

== Club career ==
Yerjet started his professional football career in 2012 when he joined China League Two side Xinjiang Begonia for the 2012 China League Two. He made twenty-three appearances in the 2012 season. However, he became an unattached player after Xinjiang quit from the league in 2013 due to financial difficulties.

Yerjet moved to Portugal and signed a half-year contract with Campeonato de Portugal side Gondomar in January 2014. He quickly established himself within the team and made his senior debut in Portugal on 13 April 2014 in a 2–1 home defeat against Amarante. Yerjet made five league appearances in the 2013–14 season and extended his contract with the club. He transferred to first tier side Paços de Ferreira along with teammate Tang Shi in the summer of 2016.

Yerjet joined LigaPro side Leixões in July 2017. On 20 September 2017, he made his debut for the club in a 1–0 home win against Paços de Ferreira in the group stage of 2017–18 Taça da Liga. He made his league debut on 26 November 2017 in a 0–0 home draw against Benfica B. Yerjet terminated his contract with the club and received trial with Chinese Super League side Tianjin Quanjian in January 2018. However, Leixões stated that Tianjin Quanjian contact the player illegally before he terminated his contract. His transfer deal was eventually suspended at the end of January 2018.

Yerjet signed a short-term contract with Campeonato de Portugal side Salgueiros in February 2018. On 11 February 2018, he made his debut in a 3–0 home win against Cinfães, ending Salgueiros' five-game winless streak. He kept consecutive clean sheets in his first six matches for the club and was chosen in the best team of round in his first four matches.

Yerjet rejoined Gondomar in the summer of 2018, signing a one-year contract. On 11 August 2018, he made his return debut in a 2–1 home win over Amarante. He played every minute of Gondomar's official matches in the 2018–19 season before he returned to China in February 2019.

On 22 February 2019, Yerjet transferred to Chinese Super League side Chongqing Dangdai Lifan. He would go on to make his debut in a Chinese FA Cup game on 1 May 2019 against Hebei China Fortune in a 1–0 victory. He would leave the club when they were dissolved on 24 May 2022 after the majority owner, Wuhan Dangdai Group could not restructure the clubs shareholdings and debt. On 26 August 2022 he would join second tier club Heilongjiang Ice City.

== Career statistics ==
As of 31 December 2022

Appearances and goals by club, season and competition
Club	Season	League			National cup		League cup		Continental		Total	
Club	Season	Division	Apps	Goals	Apps	Goals	Apps	Goals	Apps	Goals	Apps	Goals
Xinjiang Begonia	2012	China League Two	23	0	–		–		–		23	0
Xinjiang Begonia	2013		–		2	0	–		–		2	0
Xinjiang Begonia	Total		30	0	3	0	0	0	0	0	33	0
Gondomar	2013–14	Campeonato de Portugal	5	0	0	0	–		–		5	0
Gondomar	2014–15	Campeonato de Portugal	13	0	1	0	–		–		14	0
Gondomar	2015–16	Campeonato de Portugal	12	0	2	0	–		–		14	0
Gondomar	Total		23	0	2	0	0	0	0	0	25	0
Paços de Ferreira	2016–17	Primeira Liga	0	0	0	0	0	0	–		0	0
Leixões	2017–18	LigaPro	1	0	1	0	1	0	–		3	0
Salgueiros	2017–18	Campeonato de Portugal	11	0	0	0	–		–		11	0
Gondomar	2018–19	Campeonato de Portugal	21	0	2	0	–		–		23	0
Chongqing Lifan	2019	Chinese Super League	5	0	2	0	–		–		7	0
Chongqing Lifan	2020	Chinese Super League	2	0	0	0	–		–		2	0
Chongqing Lifan	2021	Chinese Super League	0	0	0	0	–		–		0	0
Chongqing Lifan	Total		7	0	2	0	0	0	0	0	9	0
Heilongjiang Ice City	2022	China League One	13	0	0	0	–		–		13	0
Heilongjiang Ice City	2023	China League One	0	0	0	0	–		–		0	0
Heilongjiang Ice City	Total		13	0	0	0	0	0	0	0	13	0
Career total			106	0	10	0	1	0	0	0	117	0
