= Zhang Yanjun =

Chinese footballer

Zhang Yanjun 张延军
Personal information
- Date of birth: 7 February 1993 (age 33)
- Place of birth: Shenyang, Liaoning, China
- Height: 1.78 m (5 ft 10 in)
- Position: Midfielder

Team information
- Current team: Jiangxi Lushan
- Number: 22

Youth career
- 2013–2016: Liaoning Whowin

Senior career*
Years	Team	Apps	(Gls)
2012	Xinjiang Begonia	19	(0)
2017–2019	Liaoning Whowin	50	(2)
2020–2021	Jiangxi Beidamen	33	(1)
2022	Hefei City	?	(?)
2023–	Jiangxi Lushan	48	(2)
- * Club domestic league appearances and goals as of 31 December 2025

Zhang Yanjun (simplified Chinese: 张延军; traditional Chinese: 張延軍; pinyin: Zhāng Yánjūn; born 7 February 1993) is a Chinese footballer who currently plays for Chinese club Jiangxi Lushan.

== Club career ==
Zhang Yanjun started his professional football career in 2012 when he was loaned to China League Two side Xinjiang Begonia from Liaoning F.C. He played at Liaoning's reserve team after his return and was eventually promoted to the first team squad in the 2017 season. On 2 May 2017, he made his senior debut for Liaoning in a 4–3 away defeat against Hangzhou Greentown in the 2017 Chinese FA Cup. He made his Chinese Super League debut on 20 May 2017 in a 2–0 away defeat against Hebei China Fortune, coming on as a substitute for Wang Liang in the 28th minute. He became a regular starter after his impressive performance in the match. On 24 June 2017, Zhang scored his first senior goal in a 2–1 away loss against Tianjin Quanjian. On 6 August 2017, Zhang collapsed in a league match against Guangzhou R&F at Yuexiushan Stadium where he collided with Ye Chugui. He was hospitalised and diagnosed as spinal shock.

== Career statistics ==
As of 31 December 2025.

Club	Season	League			National Cup		Continental		Other		Total	
Club	Season	Division	Apps	Goals	Apps	Goals	Apps	Goals	Apps	Goals	Apps	Goals
Xinjiang Begonia	2012	China League Two	19	0	-		-		-		19	0
Liaoning F.C.	2017	Chinese Super League	16	1	1	0	-		-		17	1
Liaoning F.C.	2018	China League One	18	1	0	0	-		-		18	1
Liaoning F.C.	2019	China League One	16	0	0	0	-		-		16	0
Liaoning F.C.	Total		50	2	1	0	0	0	0	0	51	2
Jiangxi Liansheng	2020	China League One	3	0	-		-		0 (Note: Appearances in China League One Relegation play-offs)	0	15	0
Jiangxi Liansheng	2021	China League One	30	1	0	0	-		-		30	1
Jiangxi Liansheng	Total		33	1	0	0	0	0	0	0	33	1
Hefei City	2022	CMCL	?	?	-		-		-		?	?
Jiangxi Lushan	2023	China League One	4	0	0	0	-		-		4	0
Jiangxi Lushan	2024	China League One	24	0	1	0	-		-		25	0
Jiangxi Lushan	2025	China League Two	20	2	2	1	-		-		22	3
Jiangxi Lushan	Total		48	2	3	1	0	0	0	0	51	3
Career total			150	5	4	1	0	0	0	0	154	5
