= Yang Changpeng =

Chinese footballer

Personal information
- Full name: Yang Changpeng
- Date of birth: May 1, 1989 (age 37)
- Place of birth: Wuhan, Hubei, China
- Height: 2.05 m (6 ft 8 1/2 in)
- Position: Forward

Youth career
- 2005–2007: Wuhan Optics Valley

Senior career*
Years	Team	Apps	(Gls)
2008	Wuhan Optics Valley	1	(0)
2009	→ CTGU (loan)	12	(1)
2010–2011	Chengdu Blades	7	(0)
2012	Shenzhen Fengpeng	24	(3)
2013–2014	Meizhou Kejia	12	(2)
2015–2016	Yinchuan Helanshan	22	(6)
2017–2019	Henan Jianye	8	(0)
Total		86	(12)
- * Club domestic league appearances and goals

Yang Changpeng (simplified Chinese: 杨昌鹏; traditional Chinese: 楊昌鵬; pinyin: Yáng Chāngpéng; born May 1, 1989) is a Chinese former footballer.

== Club career ==
Yang Changpeng was scouted by Xiao Duyin, by-then youth coach of the Wuhan Optics Valley youth team when he was coaching his team for pre-season at Hainan Province. By then, 15 years old, Yang Changpeng has left their hometown Wuhan for 3 years, looking for a chance at Guangdong and then Hainan, before finally earning a chance back home. In October 2006, already 2 metres high, he was scouted by Bolton Wanderers and invited to a one-month trial in England, where he was dubbed 'China's Peter Crouch' by the British media due to his extremely tall stature. On his return from Britain he eventually graduated to their senior side and made his debut for them in a league game on September 20, 2008, against Shaanxi CSCE.

However, his time at Wuhan was suddenly cut short when the club had a dispute with the Chinese Football Association after the club's management did not accept the punishment given to them by the Chinese Football Association after a scuffle broke out during a league game against Beijing Guoan on September 27, 2008, and decided to pull out of the league and then dissolved, which saw all of the first team loaned or sold off.

Being a promising youngster, Yang was loaned out to third-tier team CTGU before the start of the 2009 season. After his loan ended, Hubei Greenery, Wuhan Optics Valley's successor, tried to buy back the contracts of many of Wuhan's players, which included Yang; however, in July 2010, he transferred to second-tier club Chengdu Blades. At his new club, he sat on the bench while Chengdu won promotion to the top tier at the end of the 2010 China League One season. However, Yang was eventually given his chance within the team the following season when he made his debut for the club on May 22, 2011, in a league game against Qingdao Jonoon in a 0–0 draw.

After the 2011 season, Yang Changpeng became a free agent and went for various trails and ended up in Shenzhen with the newly founded Shenzhen Fengpeng. He finally found himself a starting position at the senior level and provided constant tactical points as a target man using his extraordinary height. But in the key semi-final of post-season play-offs against Hubei China-Kyle, Yang Chengpeng was wrongly sent off after being brought down by an opposition player, which turned out to be a watershed that lost the promotion for Fengpeng.

In March 2015, Yang transferred to fellow China League Two side Yinchuan Helanshan. In February 2017, Yang transferred to Super League side Henan Jianye. He made his debut for Henan on March 5, 2017, in a 0–0 home draw against Hebei China Fortune, coming on as a substitute for Zhong Jinbao in the 62nd minute.

== Career statistics ==
Club	Season	League			National Cup		Continental		Other		Total	
Club	Season	Division	Apps	Goals	Apps	Goals	Apps	Goals	Apps	Goals	Apps	Goals
Wuhan Optics Valley	2008	Chinese Super League	1	0	-		-		-		1	0
CTGU (loan)	2009	China League Two	12	1	-		-		-		12	1
Chengdu Blades	2010	China League One	1	0	-		-		-		1	0
Chengdu Blades	2011	Chinese Super League	6	0	0	0	-		-		6	0
Chengdu Blades	Total		7	0	0	0	0	0	0	0	7	0
Shenzhen Fengpeng	2012	China League Two	24	3	-		-		-		24	3
Meizhou Kejia	2013	China League Two	5	0	-		-		-		5	0
Meizhou Kejia	2014	China League Two	7	2	0	0	-		-		7	2
Meizhou Kejia	Total		12	2	0	0	0	0	0	0	12	2
Yinchuan Helanshan	2015	China League Two	9	3	0	0	-		-		9	3
Yinchuan Helanshan	2016	China League Two	13	3	2	0	-		-		15	3
Yinchuan Helanshan	Total		22	6	2	0	0	0	0	0	24	6
Henan Jianye	2017	Chinese Super League	8	0	0	0	-		-		8	0
Career total			86	12	2	0	0	0	0	0	88	12
