= Chen Xiao (footballer) =

Chinese football player

Chen Xiao 陈晓
Personal information
- Date of birth: 10 August 1989 (age 37)
- Place of birth: Dezhou, Shandong, China
- Height: 1.83 m (6 ft 0 in)
- Position: Defender

Team information
- Current team: Jiangxi Beidamen
- Number: 6

Senior career*
Years	Team	Apps	(Gls)
2008–2013	Guizhou Zhicheng	77	(4)
2014–2015	Yanbian FC	41	(0)
2016–2019	Hangzhou Greentown	83	(5)
2020–2021	Hebei China Fortune	3	(0)
2022–	Jiangxi Beidamen	0	(0)
- * Club domestic league appearances and goals as of 27 April 2022

Chen Xiao (Chinese: 陈晓; born 10 August 1989 in Dezhou, Shandong) is a Chinese football player who currently plays for China League One side Jiangxi Beidamen.

== Club career ==
Chen Xiao started his professional football career in 2008 when he was promoted to Guizhou Zhicheng's first squad. On 22 January 2014, Chen signed for China League One side Yanbian FC.

On 17 February 2016, Chen transferred to Chinese Super League side Hangzhou Greentown. On 6 March 2016, Chen made his Super League debut in the first match of 2016 season against Changchun Yatai, coming on as a substitute for Oh Beom-seok in the 77th minute.

== Career statistics ==
Statistics accurate as of match played 31 December 2020.

Club performance			League		Cup		League Cup		Continental		Total	
Club	Season	League	Apps	Goals	Apps	Goals	Apps	Goals	Apps	Goals	Apps	Goals
Guizhou Zhicheng	2008	China League Two			-		-		-			
Guizhou Zhicheng	2009	China League Two			-		-		-			
Guizhou Zhicheng	2010	China League Two			-		-		-			
Guizhou Zhicheng	2011	China League One	23	1	1	0	-		-		24	1
Guizhou Zhicheng	2012	China League Two	26	3	2	0	-		-		28	3
Guizhou Zhicheng	2013	China League One	28	0	0	0	-		-		28	0
Guizhou Zhicheng	Total		77	4	3	0	0	0	0	0	80	4
Yanbian FC	2014	China League One	29	0	1	0	-		-		30	0
Yanbian FC	2015	China League One	12	0	1	0	-		-		13	0
Yanbian FC	Total		41	0	2	0	0	0	0	0	43	0
Hangzhou Greentown	2016	Chinese Super League	22	0	1	0	-		-		23	0
Hangzhou Greentown	2017	China League One	25	2	2	0	-		-		27	2
Hangzhou Greentown	2018	China League One	24	2	0	0	-		-		24	2
Hangzhou Greentown	2019	China League One	12	1	0	0	-		-		12	1
Hangzhou Greentown	Total		83	5	3	0	0	0	0	0	86	5
Hebei China Fortune	2020	Chinese Super League	2	0	1	0	-		-		3	0
Career total			203	9	9	0	0	0	0	0	212	9

== Honours ==
=== Club ===
Yanbian FC

- China League One: 2015
