= Shirzat Halil =

Chinese association football player

Personal information
- Date of birth: 21 January 1997 (age 29)
- Height: 1.73 m (5 ft 8 in)
- Position: Midfielder

Team information
- Current team: Xinjiang Tianshan Leopard
- Number: 8

Youth career
- –2021: Chongqing Liangjiang Athletic

Senior career*
Years	Team	Apps	(Gls)
2021–2023	Xinjiang Tianshan Leopard	1	(0)
- * Club domestic league appearances and goals as of 14:01, 9 August 2021 (UTC)

Shirzat Halil (Chinese: 西热扎提·黑力力; born 21 January 1997) is a Chinese footballer who played most recently as a midfielder for Xinjiang Tianshan Leopard.

== Career statistics ==
=== Club ===
As of 9 August 2021.

Club	Season	League			Cup		Other		Total	
Club	Season	Division	Apps	Goals	Apps	Goals	Apps	Goals	Apps	Goals
Xinjiang Tianshan Leopard	2021	China League One	1	0	0	0	0	0	1	0
Career total			1	0	0	0	0	0	1	0
