= Ibán Cuadrado =

Spanish footballer

Personal information
- Full name: Ibán Javier Cuadrado Alonso
- Date of birth: 21 February 1979 (age 47)
- Place of birth: Salamanca, Spain
- Height: 1.88 m (6 ft 2 in)
- Position: Centre-back

Youth career
- 1993–1997: Barcelona

Senior career*
Years	Team	Apps	(Gls)
1997–1998	Barcelona C	31	(5)
1997–2001	Barcelona B	101	(9)
1998	Barcelona	0	(0)
2001–2008	Murcia	217	(4)
2008–2010	Málaga	18	(0)
2010	Rayo Vallecano	6	(0)
2010–2011	Ponferradina	31	(0)
2011–2012	Salamanca	31	(0)
2013–2014	Shanghai SIPG	57	(1)
2015–2016	Guizhou Zhicheng	52	(0)
Total		544	(19)

Managerial career
- 2024: Wuxi Wugo
- 2024: Yanbian Longding
- * Club domestic league appearances and goals

Ibán Javier Cuadrado Alonso (Spanish pronunciation: [iˈβaŋ kwaˈðɾaðo]; (Note: In isolation, Ibán is pronounced [iˈβan].) born 21 February 1979) is a Spanish former professional footballer who played as a central defender, currently a manager.

He amassed Segunda División totals of 248 games and five goals over the course of eight seasons, mainly in representation of Real Murcia. He also spent four years in La Liga, two apiece with that club and Málaga for a total of 62 matches.

== Club career ==
Cuadrado was born in Salamanca, Region of León. A product of La Liga giants FC Barcelona, he would play almost exclusively for their B team in both the second and third divisions. Courtesy of Louis van Gaal, he appeared in one UEFA Champions League game with the main squad, featuring one minute in a 2–0 group-stage away win over Brøndby IF on 9 December 1998.

Released by the Catalans in 2001, Cuadrado signed with Real Murcia CF, where he would be an indispensable element throughout seven seasons, helping to two promotions (although he appeared in just ten matches in the 2007–08 campaign, which ended in La Liga relegation).

Subsequently, Cuadrado joined Málaga CF, recently promoted to the top flight, where he was only third or fourth choice. On 14 January 2010 he moved to Rayo Vallecano, signing with the second-tier side until the end of that season and the next. He made his debut three days later, starting in the 4–4 home draw against Hércules CF and scoring an own goal.

After one unsuccessful season with Rayo individually, the 31-year-old Cuadrado switched to SD Ponferradina of division two, reuniting with former Málaga teammates Javi López, Daniel Toribio and Miguel Ángel. In summer 2011, following his team's relegation, he returned to his hometown and signed with lowly UD Salamanca.

Cuadrado moved abroad for the first time in his career at the age of 34, joining Chinese Super League's Shanghai SIPG FC. In March 2015 he switched clubs but stayed in the nation, transferring to Guizhou Hengfeng Zhicheng F.C. from the League One.

In October 2018, Cuadrado returned to the Camp Nou, as youth assistant coach.

== Career statistics ==
Appearances and goals by club, season and competition
Club	Season	League			Cup		Other		Total	
Club	Season	Division	Apps	Goals	Apps	Goals	Apps	Goals	Apps	Goals
Barcelona B	1997–98	Segunda División B	2	0	—		—		2	0
Barcelona B	1998–99	Segunda División	38	1	—		—		38	1
Barcelona B	1999–2000	Segunda División B	33	2	—		—		33	2
Barcelona B	2000–01	Segunda División B	28	6	—		—		28	6
Barcelona B	Total		101	9	—		—		101	9
Barcelona	2000–01	La Liga	0	0	0	0	—		2	0
Murcia	2001–02	Segunda División	28	1	1	0	—		29	1
Murcia	2002–03	Segunda División	35	0	5	0	—		40	0
Murcia	2003–04	La Liga	34	0	1	0	—		35	0
Murcia	2004–05	Segunda División	36	1	2	0	—		38	1
Murcia	2005–06	Segunda División	40	2	0	0	—		40	2
Murcia	2006–07	Segunda División	34	0	0	0	—		20	4
Murcia	2007–08	La Liga	10	0	2	0	—		16	7
Murcia	Total		217	4	11	0	—		228	4
Málaga	2008–09	La Liga	14	0	2	0	—		16	0
Málaga	2009–10	La Liga	4	0	0	0	—		4	0
Málaga	Total		18	0	2	0	—		20	0
Rayo Vallecano	2009–10	Segunda División	6	0	—		—		6	0
Ponferradina	2010–11	Segunda División	31	0	1	0	—		32	0
Salamanca	2011–12	Segunda División B	31	0	1	0	—		32	0
Shanghai SIPG	2013	Chinese Super League	30	1	0	0	—		30	1
Shanghai SIPG	2014	Chinese Super League	27	0	0	0	—		27	0
Shanghai SIPG	Total		57	1	0	0	—		57	1
Guizhou Zhicheng	2015	China League One	26	0	0	0	—		26	0
Guizhou Zhicheng	2016	China League One	26	0	0	0	—		26	0
Guizhou Zhicheng	Total		52	0	0	0	—		52	0
Career total			513	14	15	0	0	0	528	14
