= 2015 China League One =

China League One
- Season: 2015
- Champions: Yanbian Changbaishan
- Promoted: Yanbian Changbaishan; Hebei Zhongji
- Relegated: Beijing BIT; Jiangxi Liansheng
- Matches: 240
- Goals: 623 (2.6 per match)
- Top goalscorer: (South Korea) Ha Tae-kyun (26 goals)
- Biggest home win: Wuhan Zall 6–0 Shenzhen F.C. (May 31st, 2015) (6 goals)
- Biggest away win: Qingdao Jonoon 1–5 Guizhou Zhicheng (Jun. 6th, 2015) (4 goals)
- Highest scoring: Hebei Zhongji 6–1 Qingdao Hainiu (Jul. 26th, 2015); Yanbian Changbaishan 6–1 Xinjiang Tianshan Leopard (Aug. 8th, 2015); Beijing BIT 3–4 Hebei Zhongji (Sep. 5th, 2015) (7 goals)
- Longest winning run: Hebei Zhongji (8 matches)
- Longest unbeaten run: Yanbian Changbaishan (21 matches)
- Longest winless run: Tianjin Songjiang (10 matches)
- Longest losing run: Jiangxi Liansheng; Tianjin Songjiang; Dalian Aerbin; Beijing BIT; Qingdao Jonoon (4 matches)
- Highest attendance: 42,591; Dalian Aerbin 1−1 Yanbian Changbaishan (Sep. 19th, 2015)
- Lowest attendance: 741; Xinjiang Tianshan Leopard 2−2 Qingdao Hainiu (Sep. 14th, 2015)
- Average attendance: 8,859

The 2015 China League One is the 12th season of the China League One, the second tier of the Chinese football league pyramid, since its establishment in 2004. The league title sponsor is 58.com.

== Teams ==
A total of 16 teams will contest the league, including 11 sides from the 2014 season, two relegated from the 2014 Chinese Super League and three promoted from the 2014 China League Two.

=== Team changes ===
==== To League One ====
Teams relegated from 2014 Chinese Super League

- Dalian Aerbin
- Harbin Yiteng

Teams promoted from 2014 China League Two

- Jiangxi Liansheng
- Taiyuan Zhongyou Jiayi
- Guizhou Zhicheng

==== From League One ====
Teams promoted to 2015 Chinese Super League

- Chongqing Lifan
- Shijiazhuang Yongchang

Dissolved entries

- ~~Shenyang Zhongze~~
- ~~Shaanxi Wuzhou（Guangdong Sunray Cave）~~

Teams relegated to 2015 China League Two and Dissolved entries

- ~~Chengdu Tiancheng~~

=== Name changes ===
- Guangdong Sunray Cave F.C. moved to the city of Xi'an and changed their name to Shaanxi Wuzhou F.C. in December 2014.
- Beijing Baxy F.C. changed their name to Beijing Enterprises Group F.C. in December 2014.
- Taiyuan Zhongyou Jiayi F.C. moved to the city of Hohhot and changed their name to Nei Mongol Zhongyou F.C. in January 2015.
- Shenzhen Ruby F.C. changed their name to Shenzhen F.C. in January 2015.

== Clubs ==
=== Stadiums and Locations ===
Club name	Team name	Head coach	City	Stadium	Capacity	2014 season
Dalian Aerbin ^{R}	Dalian Aerbin	(Sweden) Mikael Stahre	Dalian	Dalian Sports Center	61,000	CSL, 15th
Harbin Yiteng ^{R}	Harbin Yiteng	(China) Duan Xin	Harbin	Harbin ICE Sports Center	50,000	CSL, 16th
Wuhan Zall	Wuhan Zall	(China) Zheng Xiong	Wuhan	Xinhua Road Sports Center	32,137	3rd
Beijing Enterprises Group	Beijing BG Yanjing	(Serbia) Aleksandar Stanojević	Beijing	Olympic Sports Centre (Beijing)	36,228	4th
Qingdao Jonoon	Qingdao Jonoon	(Serbia) Dragan Stančić (caretaker)	Qingdao	Qingdao Tiantai Stadium	20,525	5th
Hunan Billows	Hunan Billows	(North Macedonia) Žikica Tasevski	Changsha (playing in Yiyang)	Yiyang Olympic Sports Park Stadium	30,000	6th
Tianjin Songjiang	Tianjin Songjiang	(Croatia) Goran Tomić	Tianjin	Tianjin Tuanbo Football Stadium	30,320	7th
Shenzhen F.C.	Shenzhen Sky Forever	(Hong Kong) Li Haiqiang (caretaker)	Shenzhen	Bao'an Stadium	40,000	8th
Beijing BIT	Beijing Xinyuan	(China) Yuan Wei	Beijing	BIT Eastern Athletic Field	5,000	9th
Xinjiang Tianshan Leopard	Xinjiang Dabancheng Nahuan	(China) Li Jun	Ürümqi	Xinjiang Sports Centre	50,000	10th
Qingdao Hainiu	Qingdao Huanghai Hainiu	(China) Sun Xinbo (caretaker)	Qingdao	Conson Stadium	45,000	12th
Hebei Zhongji	Hebei China Fortune	(China) Li Tie	Qinhuangdao	Qinhuangdao Olympic Sports Center Stadium	33,572	14th
Yanbian Changbaishan	Yanbian Changbaishan	(South Korea) Park Tae-ha	Yanji	Yanji Nationwide Fitness Centre Stadium	30,000	16th
Jiangxi Liansheng ^{P}	Jiangxi Liansheng	(China) Sun Wei	Nanchang	Jiangxi Olympic Sports Center	50,000	CL2, 1st
Nei Mongol Zhongyou ^{P}	Hohhot Zhongyou	(China) Wang Bo	Hohhot	Hohhot City Stadium	60,000	CL2, 2nd
Guizhou Zhicheng ^{P}	Guizhou Zhicheng	(China) Chen Mao	Guiyang	Guizhou Provincial Stadium	18,000	CL2, 3rd

Location of teams in 2015 China League One

=== Managerial changes ===
Club	Outgoing manager	Date of vacancy	Incoming manager	Date of appointment
Tianjin Songjiang	(Portugal) Manuel Cajuda	6 November 2014	(Croatia) Dražen Besek	15 December 2014
Hunan Billows	(China) Huang Cheng	27 November 2014	(Bulgaria) Aleksandar Stankov	27 November 2014
Yanbian Changbaishan	(China) Gao Zhongxun	5 December 2014	(South Korea) Park Tae-ha	5 December 2014
Dalian Aerbin	(Japan) Yasuharu Kurata	31 December 2014	(Sweden) Mikael Stahre	5 January 2015
Hebei Zhongji	(Uruguay) Alejandro Larrea	31 December 2014	(Serbia) Radomir Antić	27 January 2015
Guizhou Zhicheng	(China) Zhang Jun	31 December 2014	(China) Chen Mao	29 January 2015
Harbin Yiteng	(Croatia) Marijo Tot	31 December 2014	(China) Duan Xin (caretaker)	31 December 2014
Beijing Enterprises Group	(Croatia) Goran Tomić	12 January 2015	(Serbia) Aleksandar Stanojević	12 January 2015
Jiangxi Liansheng	(China) Li Xiao	26 February 2015	(China) Huang Yan	9 March 2015
Shenzhen F.C.	(China) Li Yi	12 April 2015	(South Korea) Lee Lim-saeng	12 April 2015
Hunan Billows	(Bulgaria) Aleksandar Stankov	2 May 2015	(China) Zhang Xu (caretaker)	2 May 2015
Tianjin Songjiang	(Croatia) Dražen Besek	6 May 2015	(China) Sun Jianjun (caretaker)	6 May 2015
Tianjin Songjiang	(China) Sun Jianjun (caretaker)	12 May 2015	(Croatia) Goran Tomić	12 May 2015
Harbin Yiteng	(China) Duan Xin (caretaker)	5 June 2015	(China) Gai Zengjun (caretaker)	5 June 2015
Harbin Yiteng	(China) Gai Zengjun (caretaker)	17 June 2015	(China) Duan Xin	17 June 2015
Jiangxi Liansheng	(China) Huang Yan	8 July 2015	(China) Sun Wei	8 July 2015
Wuhan Zall	(China) Zheng Bin	15 July 2015	(China) Zheng Xiong	15 July 2015
Qingdao Hainiu	(China) Su Maozhen	28 July 2015	(China) Sun Xinbo (caretaker)	28 July 2015
Hunan Billows	(China) Zhang Xu (caretaker)	6 August 2015	(North Macedonia) Žikica Tasevski	6 August 2015
Hebei Zhongji	(Serbia) Radomir Antić	18 August 2015	(China) Li Tie	18 August 2015
Shenzhen F.C.	(South Korea) Lee Lim-saeng	28 August 2015	(Hong Kong) Li Haiqiang (caretaker)	28 August 2015
Qingdao Jonoon	(Slovenia) Tomaž Kavčič	5 October 2015	(Serbia) Dragan Stančić (caretaker)	5 October 2015

=== Foreign players ===
Restricting the number of foreign players strictly to three per CL1 team. A team could use three foreign players on the field each game. Outfield players came from Hong Kong, Macau and Chinese Taipei were deemed as native players (doesn't count on the foreign player slot) in CL1.

Club	Player 1	Player 2	Player 3	Former Players^{1}
Beijing Enterprises Group	(Colombia) Carmelo Valencia	(Montenegro) Nikola Vujadinović	(Serbia) Danko Lazović	(Brazil) Éder Lima
Beijing BIT	(Uruguay) Maureen Franco	(Uruguay) Andrés Márquez	(Uruguay) Abel Nazario	(Uruguay) Julio Gutiérrez
Dalian Aerbin	(Brazil) Bruno Meneghel	(Sweden) Niklas Backman	(Sweden) Mathias Ranégie	
Guizhou Zhicheng	(Brazil) Rodrigo	(Cameroon) Yves Ekwalla Herman	(Spain) Ibán Cuadrado	
Harbin Yiteng	(Australia) Adam Hughes	(Colombia) Juan Gilberto Núñez	(Colombia) Ricardo Steer	(Colombia) Jair Reinoso
Hebei Zhongji	(Brazil) Edu	(Norway) Abdurahim Laajab	(Serbia) Nenad Milijas	(Serbia) Miroslav Radović
Hunan Billows	(Colombia) Luis Carlos Cabezas	(Montenegro) Igor Burzanović	(Serbia) Stevan Bates	
Jiangxi Liansheng	(Brazil) Demerson	(Brazil) Léo Itaperuna	(Brazil) Adi Rocha	(Brazil) Jajá
Nei Mongol Zhongyou	(Australia) Jonas Salley	(Brazil) Dori	(Brazil) William Paulista	
Qingdao Hainiu	(Serbia) Đorđe Rakić	(South Korea) Kim Seung-yong	(Uruguay) Julio Gutiérrez	(Serbia) Goran Gogić
Qingdao Jonoon	(Brazil) Deivdy Reis	(Brazil) Rogerinho	(Ivory Coast) Ismaël Béko Fofana	(Honduras) Jorge Claros
Shenzhen F.C.	(Senegal) Babacar Gueye	(Senegal) André Senghor	(South Korea) Kim Young-hoo	(Italy) Giuseppe Aquaro
Tianjin Songjiang	(Brazil) Mário Lúcio	(Colombia) Juan Andrés Bolaños	(England) Frank Nouble	(Brazil) Nei
Wuhan Zall	(Ghana) Ransford Addo	(Guadeloupe) Brice Jovial	(Spain) Rafa Jordà	
Xinjiang Tianshan Leopard	(Brazil) Rafael	(Brazil) Vicente	(Romania) Cristian Dănălache	(Brazil) Felipe Félix
Yanbian Changbaishan	(Brazil) Jailton Paraiba	(The Gambia) Bubacarr Trawally	(South Korea) Ha Tae-goon	

- ^1 Foreign players who left their clubs after first half of the season.

Hong Kong/Macau/Taiwan outfield players:

Club	Player 1	Player 2	Player 3
Beijing Enterprises Group	(Chinese Taipei) Chen Hao-wei	(Chinese Taipei) Wen Chih-hao	(Hong Kong) Godfred Karikari
Harbin Yiteng	(Hong Kong) Liu Quankun		
Hunan Billows	(Chinese Taipei) Chen Chao-an		
Tianjin Songjiang	(Hong Kong) Ng Wai Chiu		

== League table ==
Pos	Team	Pld	W	D	L	GF	GA	GD	Pts	Promotion or relegation
1	Yanbian Changbaishan (C, P)	30	17	10	3	59	24	+35	61	Promotion to 2016 CSL
2	Hebei Zhongji (P)	30	18	6	6	53	30	+23	60	Promotion to 2016 CSL
3	Dalian Aerbin	30	17	7	6	46	22	+24	58	
4	Beijing Enterprises Group	30	17	5	8	48	29	+19	56	
5	Harbin Yiteng	30	11	14	5	43	31	+12	47	
6	Nei Mongol Zhongyou	30	12	7	11	38	32	+6	43	
7	Qingdao Jonoon	30	11	8	11	30	39	−9	41	
8	Xinjiang Tianshan Leopard	30	10	9	11	43	51	−8	39	
9	Tianjin Songjiang	30	9	9	12	28	33	−5	36 (Note: Tianjin 3–1 Wuhan; Wuhan 0–1 Tianjin)	
10	Wuhan Zall	30	8	12	10	31	30	+1	36	
11	Qingdao Hainiu	30	7	12	11	26	39	−13	33	
12	Shenzhen F.C.	30	6	13	11	37	48	−11	31	
13	Guizhou Zhicheng	30	8	6	16	39	55	−16	30	
14	Hunan Billows	30	8	5	17	32	48	−16	29 (Note: Hunan 2–0 BIT; BIT 0–1 Hunan)	
15	Beijing BIT (R)	30	8	5	17	40	64	−24	29	Relegation to 2016 CL2
16	Jiangxi Liansheng (R)	30	5	8	17	32	50	−18	23	Relegation to 2016 CL2

Updated to match(es) played on 1 November 2015. Source: sports.sina.com (in Chinese)
Rules for classification: 1) points; 2) goal difference; 3) number of goals scored; 4) head-to-head goals scored; 5) goal difference; 6) goals scored; 7) disciplinary points (1 point for each yellow card, 3 points for each red card). Head-to-Head: Only used at the end of the season when two or more teams need the head-to-head rules to break a tie.
(C) Champions; (P) Promoted; (R) Relegated

== Results ==
Home \ Away	QD	WH	DLA	HEB	SZ	JX	BG	NMZ	BJT	TJS	YB	HUN	XJT	GZZ	QDH	HBZ
Qingdao Jonoon		1–0	0–0	1–4	1–1	2–0	0–3	0–0	3–1	0–2	1–0	3–2	2–1	1–5	1–0	0–1
Wuhan Zall	1–1		1–1	2–2	6–0	1–1	1–0	1–0	1–1	0–1	0–0	3–2	1–1	1–0	0–0	1–2
Dalian Aerbin	2–0	0–0		2–2	1–0	2–0	1–0	1–0	4–1	2–0	1–1	2–0	4–0	3–3	3–0	1–0
Harbin Yiteng	1–1	1–0	2–2		2–1	2–1	0–1	2–2	2–1	1–1	3–0	1–0	3–0	0–0	2–1	1–1
Shenzhen	1–2	2–1	1–3	1–1		2–2	3–0	3–2	1–1	0–0	2–2	3–1	1–2	1–1	1–1	1–1
Jiangxi Liansheng	1–0	0–0	0–2	1–2	3–3		3–3	1–2	1–2	2–1	0–1	1–1	1–1	4–2	1–2	1–4
Beijing Enterprises Group	1–2	0–0	1–0	2–0	2–0	2–1		3–0	4–1	2–0	0–1	2–0	2–0	4–0	2–3	2–1
Nei Mongol Zhongyou	1–1	1–0	0–1	0–0	2–1	2–0	0–2		3–0	0–1	2–3	2–1	0–0	4–1	0–2	4–1
Beijing BIT	3–1	2–1	0–3	1–3	1–2	1–0	2–3	0–2		3–3	2–4	0–1	2–2	2–0	3–1	3–4
Tianjin Songjiang	1–1	3–1	2–1	1–0	0–1	0–1	1–1	0–0	0–1		1–1	1–2	1–1	2–0	0–0	2–3
Yanbian Changbaishan	0–0	2–0	2–0	1–1	1–1	2–1	5–0	3–1	4–0	0–1		4–0	6–1	4–2	2–0	3–0
Hunan Billows	0–1	1–2	0–1	2–1	1–1	3–1	1–1	0–3	2–0	2–0	0–2		4–2	1–2	0–0	1–2
Xinjiang Tianshan Leopard	1–0	2–1	3–1	1–1	3–1	3–0	2–3	2–2	3–1	2–1	1–1	2–1		4–2	2–2	0–2
Guizhou Zhicheng	3–1	0–1	0–1	1–1	2–1	1–4	1–0	1–2	4–2	3–1	0–1	1–2	2–1		1–1	0–2
Qingdao Hainiu	0–2	1–1	0–2	1–0	1–1	0–0	0–2	1–0	2–2	0–1	1–1	1–1	1–0	3–1		0–1
Hebei Zhongji	3–1	2–3	2–0	2–2	2–0	1–0	0–0	1–0	0–1	2–0	2–2	3–0	2–0	0–0	6–1	

Updated to match(es) played on 1 November 2015. Source: Results on sina.com
Legend: Blue = home team win; Yellow = draw; Red = away team win.

== Positions by round ==
Team ╲ Round	1	2	3	4	5	6	7	8	9	10	11	12	13	14	15	16	17	18	19	20	21	22	23	24	25	26	27	28	29	30
Yanbian Changbaishan	4	4	4	4	2	3	4	4	4	4	2	1	1	1	1	1	1	1	1	1	1	1	1	1	1	1	1	1	1	1
Hebei Zhongji	11	11	13	7	6	4	2	5	5	5	4	2	2	2	2	3	4	4	3	5	5	6	7	4	3	2	2	2	2	2
Dalian Aerbin	1	1	1	1	1	1	1	1	1	1	1	3	3	4	4	4	6	6	6	6	4	4	4	2	2	3	3	3	3	3
Beijing Enterprises Group	3	6	5	6	4	8	8	7	8	7	7	7	5	5	5	5	3	3	4	2	2	2	3	5	5	4	4	4	4	4
Harbin Yiteng	2	2	2	2	3	2	3	3	3	3	6	6	7	7	6	6	5	5	5	3	3	3	2	3	4	5	5	5	5	5
Nei Mongol Zhongyou	11	5	6	5	7	5	7	6	6	8	9	9	9	9	9	9	7	7	7	7	6	5	5	6	6	6	6	6	6	6
Qingdao Jonoon	15	8	8	9	10	7	5	2	2	2	3	4	4	3	3	2	2	2	2	4	7	7	6	7	7	7	7	7	7	7
Xinjiang Tianshan Leopard	16	10	12	13	12	11	10	11	11	12	11	11	12	10	12	11	10	10	9	8	9	9	9	9	9	8	8	8	8	8
Tianjin Songjiang	14	9	11	11	14	14	16	16	16	16	16	15	15	16	14	13	12	12	11	11	12	11	10	11	11	11	9	9	9	9
Wuhan Zall	4	7	7	8	9	6	9	10	7	6	5	5	6	6	7	7	8	8	8	9	8	8	8	8	8	9	10	10	10	10
Qingdao Hainiu	9	14	9	10	8	10	12	12	12	9	8	8	8	8	8	8	9	9	10	10	10	10	11	10	10	10	11	11	11	11
Shenzhen F.C.	7	11	14	14	13	12	11	8	10	11	12	13	14	13	13	15	15	14	13	13	13	14	14	14	13	13	13	13	12	12
Guizhou Zhicheng	7	13	15	15	16	16	14	13	13	13	14	12	13	14	11	10	11	11	12	12	11	12	12	12	12	12	12	12	13	13
Hunan Billows	9	15	9	11	11	13	13	15	15	15	13	14	10	11	15	14	14	13	14	14	14	13	13	13	14	14	14	14	14	14
Beijing BIT	4	3	3	3	5	9	6	9	9	10	10	10	11	12	10	12	13	15	15	15	15	15	15	15	15	15	15	15	15	15
Jiangxi Liansheng	11	16	16	16	15	15	15	14	14	14	15	16	16	15	16	16	16	16	16	16	16	16	16	16	16	16	16	16	16	16

Winner; promote to Chinese Super League
Runner-up; promote to Chinese Super League
Relegate to China League Two

Source: Table by round (in Chinese)

== Goalscorers ==
=== Top scorers ===
Rank	Player	Club	Total
1	(South Korea) Ha Tae-goon	Yanbian Changbaishan	26
2	(Romania) Cristian Dănălache	Xinjiang Tianshan Leopard	24
3	(Brazil) Bruno Meneghel	Dalian Aerbin	19
3	(Uruguay) Andrés Márquez	Beijing BIT	19
5	(Cameroon) Yves Ekwalla Herman	Guizhou Zhicheng	18
6	(The Gambia) Bubacarr Trawally	Yanbian Changbaishan	17
7	(Colombia) Carmelo Valencia	Beijing Enterprises Group	14
8	(Guadeloupe) Brice Jovial	Wuhan Zall	13
8	(Serbia) Danko Lazović	Beijing Enterprises Group	13
8	(Serbia) Nenad Milijaš	Hebei Zhongji	13

Last updated: 1 November 2015
Source: sports.sina.com

=== Hat-tricks ===
Player	For	Against	Result	Date
(Cameroon) Yves Ekwalla Herman	Guizhou Zhicheng	Dalian Aerbin	3–3	9 May 2015
(South Korea) Ha Tae-goon	Yanbian Changbaishan	Nei Mongol Zhongyou	3–1	17 May 2015
(The Gambia) Bubacarr Trawally	Yanbian Changbaishan	Guizhou Zhicheng	4–2	18 July 2015
(Brazil) Edu	Hebei Zhongji	Qingdao Hainiu	6–1	26 July 2015
(The Gambia) Bubacarr Trawally	Yanbian Changbaishan	Xinjiang Tianshan Leopard	6–1	8 August 2015
(Cameroon) Yves Ekwalla Herman	Guizhou Zhicheng	Beijing BIT	4–2	8 September 2015
(Brazil) Bruno Meneghel	Dalian Aerbin	Beijing BIT	3–0	12 September 2015
(Romania) Cristian Dănălache	Xinjiang Tianshan Leopard	Jiangxi Liansheng	3–0	19 September 2015
(Colombia) Carmelo Valencia	Beijing Enterprises Group	Beijing BIT	4–1	19 September 2015
(Chinese Taipei) Chen Hao-wei	Beijing Enterprises Group	Guizhou Zhicheng	4–0	23 September 2015
(South Korea) Ha Tae-goon	Yanbian Changbaishan	Beijing Enterprises Group	5–0	26 September 2015
(South Korea) Ha Tae-goon	Yanbian Changbaishan	Hunan Billows	4–0	24 October 2015
(Brazil) Rafael	Xinjiang Tianshan Leopard	Guizhou Zhicheng	4–2	1 November 2015

== Awards ==
The awards of 2015 China League One were announced on 3 November 2015.

- Most valuable player: (South Korea) Ha Tae-goon (Yanbian Changbaishan)
- Top scorer: (South Korea) Ha Tae-goon (Yanbian Changbaishan)
- Best goalkeeper: (China) Chi Wenyi (Yanbian Changbaishan)
- Best coach: (South Korea) Park Tae-ha (Yanbian Changbaishan)

== League Attendance ==
Pos	Team	Total	High	Low	Average	Change
1	Yanbian Changbaishan	367,367	28,941	14,876	24,491	+206.4%
2	Harbin Yiteng^{†}	307,154	30,517	5,888	20,477	−21.6%
3	Nei Mongol Zhongyou^{‡}	273,577	38,479	6,786	18,238	n/a
4	Dalian Aerbin^{†}	228,197	42,591	3,791	15,233	+38.6%
5	Shenzhen F.C.	173,361	15,811	6,663	11,557	+92.3%
6	Hebei Zhongji	117,472	20,810	3,525	7,831	+25.5%
7	Tianjin Songjiang	110,531	17,686	1,780	7,369	+193.5%
8	Beijing Enterprises Group	81,520	8,135	3,316	5,435	+225.8%
9	Qingdao Jonoon	81,501	12,867	1,279	5,433	+50.8%
10	Jiangxi Liansheng^{‡}	80,236	17,613	838	5,349	n/a
11	Wuhan Zall	79,501	12,168	3,126	5,300	−37.3%
12	Qingdao Hainiu	73,337	20,186	1,931	5,238	+23.9%
13	Hunan Billows	71,919	22,510	1,325	4,795	−7.2%
14	Xinjiang Tianshan Leopard	61,714	13,745	741	4,114	+30.1%
15	Guizhou Zhicheng^{‡}	28,071	3,653	1,105	1,871	n/a
16	Beijing BIT	26,232	2,982	910	1,749	+6.8%
	League total	2,161,165	42,591	741	9,007	+68.9%

Updated to games played on Nov. 1st, 2015
Source: Worldfootball.net
Notes:
^{†} Teams played previous season in CSL.
^{‡} Teams played previous season in CL2.
