= Jhon Valoy =

Colombian footballer (born 1991)

Personal information
- Full name: Jhon Edwar Valoy Riascos
- Date of birth: 26 July 1991 (age 35)
- Place of birth: Cali, Colombia
- Height: 1.79 m (5 ft 10 in)
- Position: Midfielder

Youth career
- –2008: Centauros Villavicencio
- 2009–2010: Deportes Quindío

Senior career*
Years	Team	Apps	(Gls)
2010–2011	Deportes Quindío	48	(4)
2012–2014	Atlético Nacional	67	(6)
2015	Once Caldas	33	(1)
2016	Hunan Billows	10	(0)
2018–2019	Sonsonate		
- * Club domestic league appearances and goals

Jhon Edwar Valoy Riascos (born 26 July 1991) is a Colombian former footballer.

== Career statistics ==
=== Club ===
Club	Season	League			Cup		Other		Total	
Club	Season	Division	Apps	Goals	Apps	Goals	Apps	Goals	Apps	Goals
Deportes Quindío	2010	Categoría Primera A	19	1	0	0	0	0	17	0
Deportes Quindío	2011	Categoría Primera A	29	3	8 (Note: Appearances in the Copa Colombia)	0	0	0	37	3
Deportes Quindío	Total		48	4	8	0	0	0	56	4
Atlético Nacional	2012	Categoría Primera A	4	0	0	0	0	0	4	0
Atlético Nacional	2013	Categoría Primera A	38	4	12	0	0	0	50	4
Atlético Nacional	2014	Categoría Primera A	25	2	7	1	1 (Note: Appearances in the Superliga Colombiana)	0	33	3
Atlético Nacional	Total		67	6	19	1	1	0	87	7
Atlético Nacional	2015	Categoría Primera A	33	1	3	0	0	0	36	1
Hunan Billows	2016	China League One	10	0	0	0	0	0	10	0
Career total			158	11	30	1	1	0	189	12
