= Jaílton Paraíba =

Brazilian footballer (born 1990)

Personal information
- Full name: Jaílton Lourenço da Silva
- Date of birth: 11 October 1990 (age 36)
- Place of birth: Esperança, Brazil
- Height: 1.66 m (5 ft 5 1/2 in)
- Position: Winger

Senior career*
Years	Team	Apps	(Gls)
2010	União São João	18	(5)
2010–2011	Remo	21	(8)
2011	União São João	9	(0)
2011	Mogi Mirim	5	(0)
2011	CRB	10	(0)
2012	Santa Cruz	1	(0)
2012–2014	Shanghai Shenxin	67	(8)
2015	Yanbian Funde	29	(8)
2016–2017	Dalian Transcendence	38	(15)
2017–2019	Gençlerbirliği	45	(6)
2019	Tokyo Verdy	11	(4)
2021–2022	Tokyo Verdy	10	(0)
2022	Qingdao West Coast	28	(8)
2023	Sabah	14	(0)
- * Club domestic league appearances and goals as of 13 August 2023

Jaílton Lourenço da Silva, known as Jaílton Paraíba (born 11 October 1990), is a Brazilian professional footballer who plays as a winger.

== Career ==
In 2012, Jaílton Paraíba joined Chinese club Shanghai Shenxin in the Chinese Super League. He scored his first goal against Henan on 17 March.

On 7 February 2015, Jaílton Paraíba joined Yanbian Funde in the China League One. He helped Yanbian win the 2015 China League One to promote into the Chinese Super League.

On 26 January 2016, Jaílton Paraíba joined Dalian Transcendence. However, he left the team in May 2017 and terminated the contract.

On 26 August 2017, he moved to Turkish club Gençlerbirliği.

On 25 August 2019, Tokyo Verdy signed with Jaílton Paraíba.

== Career statistics ==
As of 8 June 2023

Appearances and goals by club, season and competition
Club	Season	League			State League		Cup		Continental		Other		Total	
Club	Season	Division	Apps	Goals	Apps	Goals	Apps	Goals	Apps	Goals	Apps	Goals	Apps	Goals
Mogi Mirim	2011	Campeonato Paulista	—		5	0	—		—		—		5	0
CRB	2011	Série C	10	0	—		—		—		—		10	0
Santa Cruz	2012	Campeonato Gaúcho	—		2	0	—		—		—		2	0
Shanghai Shenxin	2012	Chinese Super League	23	3	—		1	0	—		—		24	3
Shanghai Shenxin	2013	Chinese Super League	19	1	—		1	1	—		—		20	2
Shanghai Shenxin	2014	Chinese Super League	25	4	—		1	0	—		—		26	4
Shanghai Shenxin	Total		67	8	—		3	1	—		—		70	9
Yanbian Funde	2015	China League One	29	8	—		0	0	—		—		29	8
Dalian Transcendence	2016	China League One	29	12	—		0	0	—		—		29	12
Dalian Transcendence	2017	China League One	9	3	—		0	0	—		—		9	3
Dalian Transcendence	Total		38	15	—		0	0	—		—		38	15
Gençlerbirliği	2017–18	Süper Lig	17	4	—		5	0	—		—		22	4
Gençlerbirliği	2018–19	1. Lig	28	2	—		1	0	—		—		29	2
Gençlerbirliği	Total		45	6	—		6	0	—		—		51	6
Tokyo Verdy	2019	J2 League	11	4	—		—		—		—		11	4
Tokyo Verdy	2021	J2 League	10	0	—		0	0	—		—		10	0
Qingdao West Coast	2022	China League One	28	8	—		1	0	—		—		29	8
Sabah	2023	Malaysia Super League	14	0	—		2	0	—		—		16	0
Career total			252	49	7	0	12	1	0	0	0	0	271	50

== Honours ==
Yanbian Funde

- China League One: 2015
