= Rodrigo Paulista =

Brazilian footballer (born 1985)

Personal information
- Full name: Rodrigo Paixão Mesquita
- Date of birth: March 4, 1985 (age 41)
- Place of birth: São Paulo, Brazil
- Height: 1.71 m (5 ft 7 in)
- Position: Attacking midfielder

Youth career
- 2000–2002: Internacional

Senior career*
| Years | Team | Apps | (Gls) |
| 2002–2006 | Internacional | 40 | (6) |
| 2006 | Figueirense | | |
| 2007 | América | | |
| 2007–2008 | Barueri | | |
| 2008–2009 | Internacional | 2 | (0) |
| 2009 | Shenyang Dongjin | 16 | (11) |
| 2010 | Anhui Jiufang | 9 | (1) |
| 2010–2011 | Caxias | 4 | (0) |
| 2011 | → Guarani (loan) | 21 | (0) |
| 2012–2014 | Harbin Yiteng | 83 | (22) |
| 2015 | Guizhou Zhicheng | 21 | (1) |
| 2016 | Zhejiang Yiteng | 26 | (12) |
| 2017 | Bragantino | 6 | (0) |
| 2018 | Zhejiang Yiteng | 2 | (0) |
| 2019 | Novo Hamburgo | 0 | (0) |
- * Club domestic league appearances and goals as of 3 November 2018

Rodrigo Paixão Mesquita (born March 4, 1985), known as Rodrigo Paulista, is a Brazilian footballer who plays as an attacking midfielder.

Rodrigo Paulista played for Figueirense and Internacional in the Campeonato Brasileiro, and also spent a football career in Shenyang Dongjin and Anhui Jiufang in the second division of the Chinese football league.

== Honours ==
- Campeonato Gaúcho: 2003, 2004, 2005.
