= 2012 China League Two =

China League Two
- Season: 2012
- Champions: Guizhou Zhicheng
- Promoted: Guizhou Zhicheng; Hubei China-Kyle
- Matches: 327
- Goals: 858 (2.62 per match)
- Top goalscorer: Zhang Hongbin (18 Goals)
- Biggest home win: Shandong Youth 9-0 Qinghai Youth (North, May 22nd, 2012); Beijing Sangao 9-0 Qinghai Youth (North, Jul. 22nd, 2012) (9 goals)
- Biggest away win: Sichuan F.C. 0-5 Dongguan Nancheng (South, Aug. 14th, 2012) (5 goals)
- Highest scoring: Shandong Youth 9-0 Qinghai Youth (North, May 22nd, 2012); Beijing Sangao 9-0 Qinghai Youth (North, Jul. 22nd, 2012); Hubei China-Kyle 3-6 Guizhou Zhicheng (South, Aug. 14th, 2012) (9 goals)
- Longest winning run: Hebei Zhongji (9 matches)
- Longest unbeaten run: Hebei Zhongji (22 matches)
- Longest winless run: Qinghai Youth (24 matches)
- Longest losing run: Qinghai Youth (10 matches)

The 2012 Chinese Football Association Division Two League season is the 23rd season since its establishment in 1989. It is divided into two groups, North and South. There are total 26 teams participating in the league with 13 teams in each group. The league is made up of two stages, the group stage and the play-off. The Group Stage is a double round-robin format. Each team in the group will play the other teams twice, home and away. It will start on April 20 and end on September 28. The Play-off Stage is a two-legged elimination. It will start in October. At the end of the season, the two finalists of the Play-off will qualify for promotion to 2013 China League One.

== Team changes ==
=== Promotion and relegation ===
Harbin Songbei Yiteng as the 2011 season champion and Chongqing F.C. as runner-up earned promotion to the 2012 China League One. The 3rd-placed team Fujian Smart Hero was also promoted to 2012 China League One after winning the play-off match against Guizhou Zhicheng, who finished in last place in the 2011 China League One.

Guizhou Zhicheng were relegated from 2011 China League One to 2012 China League Two South Group as the last placed team after losing the play-off match against the 3rd-placed team of 2011 China League Two Fujian Smart Hero.

=== Name Changes ===
Sichuan Dujiangyan Symbol moved to Xi'an in January 2012 and changed their name to Shaanxi Daqin.

=== New entries ===
There are 15 new teams participating in 2012 China League Two. They are Beijing Youth, Beijing Sangao, Beijing Yitong Kuche, Hebei Youth, Jiangsu HHU, Qinghai Senke, Shaanxi Laochenggen, Shanxi Jiayi, Xinjiang Begonia, Chongqing Youth, Hubei China-Kyle, Jiangxi Liansheng, Kunming Ruilong, Shenzhen Fengpeng and Shenzhen Main Sports.

- Tianjin Huochetou did not participate in 2011 China League Two. They had participated in 2010 China League Two North Group and qualified for the Play-off First Round as the 3rd-placed team in the group. However they were defeated by Guizhou Zhicheng F.C. in the Play-off First Round and failed to gain promotion to 2011 China League One.

== Clubs ==
Groups	Club	Head coach	City	Stadium	Capacity	2011 season
North	Beijing Youth	(China) Zhang Jianguo	Beijing	Shijingshan Stadium	20,000	
North	Beijing Sangao	(China) Li Hui	Beijing	Haidian Stadium	5,000	
North	Beijing Yitong Kuche	(China) Yang Zheng	Beijing	Beijing Fengtai Stadium	31,043	
North	Hebei Youth	(China) Wei Yuanhao	Shijiazhuang	Yutong International Sports Center	38,000	
North	Hebei Zhongji	(Canada) Zhang Yandong	Shijiazhuang	Yutong International Sports Center	38,000	North 5th
North	Qinghai Youth	(China) Liang Jinning	Xining	Xining Ximen Stadium		North 8th
North	Qinghai Senke	(China) Song Lihui	Xining	Xining Ximen Stadium		CAFL 11th
North	Shandong Youth	(China) Hu Yijun	Weifang	Luneng Taishan Football School	4,000	North 3rd
North	Shanxi Jiayi	(China) Wu Jianwen	Taiyuan	Wanbailin Stadium; Taiyuan Institute of Electrical Engineering Stadium (Round 14–19)		
North	Shaanxi Laochenggen	(China) Zhang Yuede	Xi'an	Shaanxi Province Stadium	50,100	North 6th
North	Shanghai Zobon	(China) Cheng Yaodong	Shanghai	Jinshan Sports Centre	30,000	South 5th
North	Tianjin Huochetou	(China) Su Wei	Tianjin	Tianjin Huochetou Stadium	12,000	
North	Xinjiang Begonia	(Kazakhstan) Sergei Gorokhovodatskiy	Ürümqi	Xinjiang Sports Centre	50,000	
South	Chongqing Youth	(China) Jia Jin	Chongqing	Nanchuan Stadium	20,000	
South	Dongguan Nancheng	(Croatia) Goran Paulić	Dongguan	Dongguan Nancheng Sports Park; Meixian Tsang Hin-chi Stadium (Round 16–26)	20,000; 20,000	South 4th
South	Guangdong Youth	(China) Guo Yijun	Foshan	Century Lotus Stadium	36,686	South 7th
South	Guizhou Zhicheng ^{R}	(China) Liu Zhicai	Guiyang	Guizhou Provincial Stadium	18,000	CL1, 14th
South	Hubei China-Kyle	(China) Li Jun	Huangshi	Huangshi Stadium; Jingmen Stadium(Round 24)	15,000; 4,000	
South	Hubei Youth	(China) Hu Yijun	Wuhan	Jianghan'erqiao Athlete Training Base		South 10th
South	Jiangsu HHU	(China) Zhu Jinxing	Nanjing	Hohai University Jiangning Campus Football Field		
South	Jiangxi Liansheng	(China) Gu Mingchang	Nanchang	Jiangxi Olympic Sports Center	50,000	CAFL 2nd
South	Kunming Ruilong	(China) Gao Fulin	Kunming	Kunming Stadium	20,000	
South	Shaanxi Daqin	(China) Shang Qing	Xi'an	Shaanxi Province Stadium	50,100	South 3rd
South	Shenzhen Fengpeng	(China) Zhang Jun	Shenzhen	University Town of Shenzhen Stadium	15,942	
South	Shenzhen Main Sports	(China) Wei Haili	Shenzhen	Shenzhen Stadium	32,500	
South	Sichuan F.C.	(China) Sun Bowei	Chengdu (playing in Dujiangyan)	Dujiangyan Sport Center	12,700	South 11th

== Group Stage Standings ==
=== North Group ===
Pos	Team	Pld	W	D	L	GF	GA	GD	Pts	Qualification
1	Hebei Zhongji (Q)	24	18	5	1	49	10	+39	59	Qualification for Play-offs
2	Qinghai Senke (Q)	24	15	7	2	48	17	+31	52	Qualification for Play-offs
3	Beijing Yitong Kuche (Q)	24	15	5	4	48	17	+31	50	Qualification for Play-offs
4	Shaanxi Laochenggen (Q)	24	13	3	8	36	28	+8	42	Qualification for Play-offs
5	Xinjiang Begonia	24	12	5	7	28	26	+2	41	
6	Shanghai Zobon	24	11	7	6	36	19	+17	40	
7	Beijing Youth	23	10	5	8	39	25	+14	35	
8	Beijing Sangao	24	7	8	9	30	27	+3	29	
9	Shanxi Jiayi	24	8	4	12	31	36	−5	28	
10	Shandong Youth	24	6	4	14	32	43	−11	22	
11	Tianjin Huochetou	23	4	5	14	10	26	−16	17	
12	Hebei Youth	24	2	7	15	18	46	−28	13	
13	Qinghai Youth	24	0	3	21	10	95	−85	3	

Updated to match(es) played on Sept. 28, 2012. Source: CL2 website on sohu.com (in Chinese)
Rules for classification: 1) points; 2) head-to-head points; 3) head-to-head goal difference; 4) head-to-head goals scored; 5) goal difference; 6) number of goals scored.
(Q) Qualification for play-offs

=== South Group ===
Pos	Team	Pld	W	D	L	GF	GA	GD	Pts	Qualification
1	Guizhou Zhicheng (C, Q, P)	24	16	6	2	51	16	+35	54	Qualification for Play-offs
2	Shenzhen Fengpeng (Q)	24	13	8	3	36	17	+19	47	Qualification for Play-offs
3	Kunming Ruilong (Q)	24	14	4	6	36	23	+13	46	Qualification for Play-offs
4	Hubei China-Kyle (Q, P)	24	13	5	6	28	18	+10	44	Qualification for Play-offs
5	Shaanxi Daqin	24	12	6	6	46	32	+14	42	
6	Dongguan Nancheng	24	12	4	8	41	30	+11	40	
7	Guangdong Youth	24	9	8	7	33	31	+2	35	
8	Jiangxi Liansheng	24	6	12	6	36	32	+4	30	
9	Shenzhen Main Sports	24	7	7	10	27	38	−11	28	
10	Sichuan F.C.	24	5	4	15	19	43	−24	19	
11	Jiangsu HHU	24	5	3	16	21	42	−21	18	
12	Hubei Youth	24	3	5	16	19	48	−29	14	
13	Chongqing Youth	24	3	4	17	17	40	−23	13	

Updated to match(es) played on Sept. 28, 2012. Source: CL2 website on sohu.com (in Chinese)
Rules for classification: 1) points; 2) head-to-head points; 3) head-to-head goal difference; 4) head-to-head goals scored; 5) goal difference; 6) number of goals scored.
(C) Champions; (P) Promoted to China League One; (Q) Qualification for play-offs

== Group Stage Results ==
=== North Group ===
Home \ Away	BJY	BJS	BYK	HBY	HBZ	QHY	QHS	SDY	SXJ	SXL	SHZ	TJH	XJB
Beijing Youth		4–0	3–3	1–1	0–1	8–0	0–2	1–0	1–0	1–2	0–0	CXL (Note: This match had been canceled.)	1–2
Beijing Sangao	0–0		0–2	0–0	2–2	9–0	2–1	1–1	2–0	1–2	0–0	3–1	1–0
Beijing Yitong Kuche	0–1	2–1		6–0	0–4	5–1	0–0	6–0	1–0	3–0	2–0	3–1	3–0
Hebei Youth	1–4	1–1	0–1		1–3	3–0	0–3	0–1	1–2	2–3	1–1	1–1	0–2
Hebei Zhongji	1–0	1–0	2–0	0–0		5–0	1–1	3–0	5–1	1–0	2–0	1–0	4–0
Qinghai Youth	1–3	0–4	0–3	0–0	1–4		0–3	1–4	3–5	0–2	1–1	0–0	0–1
Qinghai Senke	1–1	4–0	1–1	4–3	1–0	5–0		2–0	4–1	0–0	0–0	2–0	5–3
Shandong Youth	1–2	0–0	2–2	2–1	0–1	9–0	1–2		3–2	1–2	1–4	0–1	2–1
Shanxi Jiayi	2–0	0–0	0–2	1–0	1–3	6–0	2–3	3–1		0–0	2–1	1–0	0–0
Shaanxi Laochenggen	1–2	1–0	1–0	6–0	1–2	3–2	1–1	2–1	3–2		2–3	2–1	0–1
Shanghai Zobon	2–1	3–1	0–2	3–0	0–0	8–0	1–0	3–1	2–0	0–1		2–0	0–1
Tianjin Huochetou	1–0	0–1	0–1	0–2	1–3	1–0	0–1	1–1	0–0	1–0	0–1		0–1
Xinjiang Begonia	3–5 (Note: This match was held in Shijingshan Stadium.)	2–1	0–0	1–0	0–0	3–0	0–2	2–0	1–0	3–1	1–1	0–0	

Updated to match(es) played on Sept. 28th, 2012. Source: China League Two Results (in Chinese)
Legend: Blue = home team win; Yellow = draw; Red = away team win.

=== South Group ===
Home \ Away	CQY	DGN	GDY	GZZ	HBC	HBY	HHU	JXL	KMR	SXD	SZF	SZM	SC
Chongqing Youth		0–1	1–2	1–2	0–0	0–1	0–1	1–2	0–4	0–1	0–0	2–3	2–0
Dongguan Nancheng	1–0		2–2	0–3	1–0	3–0	0–0	2–2	2–0	5–3	0–1	1–1	2–0
Guangdong Youth	3–1	1–2		1–1	0–2	1–1	3–2	1–1	1–2	1–0	1–0	3–0	0–2
Guizhou Zhicheng	0–1	5–0	1–1		0–0	1–1	2–1	2–0	0–2	3–0	0–0	3–0	4–1
Hubei China-Kyle	3–0	1–0	2–2	3–6		2–1	1–0	1–0	1–0	1–0	0–1	0–1	3–1
Hubei Youth	1–3	0–4	1–2	0–1	0–1		3–2	2–2	0–1	1–2	2–4	1–1	1–0
Jiangsu HHU	1–1	1–0	1–2	2–4	0–2	2–0		0–2	0–1	0–1	0–2	2–2	3–2
Jiangxi Liansheng	2–2	4–2	1–2	0–2	2–2	1–0	4–0		1–1	2–2	1–1	1–1	2–2
Kunming Ruilong	3–2	3–2	1–1	1–4	1–0	2–1	2–0	0–2		0–1	1–2	1–0	2–1
Shaanxi Daqin	4–0	2–0	1–1	0–3	1–0	5–0	5–1	2–1	2–2		1–1	3–3	0–1
Shenzhen Fengpeng	3–0	1–3	2–1	0–0	0–0	4–1	2–1	1–0	0–0	2–2		2–0	3–0
Shenzhen Main Sports	1–0	0–3 (Note: This match was held in Meixian Tsang Hin-chi Stadium.)	3–1	1–3	0–1	4–1	1–0	1–1	0–2	2–5	2–1		0–1
Sichuan F.C.	1–0	0–5	1–0	0–1	1–2	0–0	0–1	2–2	0–4	2–3	1–3	0–0	

Updated to match(es) played on Sept. 28th, 2012. Source: China League Two Results (in Chinese)
Legend: Blue = home team win; Yellow = draw; Red = away team win.

== Play-offs ==
=== Quarter-finals ===
Team 1	Agg.	Team 2	1st leg	2nd leg
Hebei Zhongji	1 - 1	Hubei China-Kyle	0 - 0	1 - 1
Shenzhen Fengpeng	3 - 2	Beijing Yitong Kuche	1 - 1	2 - 1
Guizhou Zhicheng	2 - 0	Shaanxi Laochenggen	0 - 0	2 - 0
Qinghai Senke	3 - 2	Kunming Ruilong	1 - 2	2 - 0

==== First leg ====
Oct. 7th, 2012
14:30 UTC+8

Hubei China-Kyle	0 - 0	Hebei Zhongji
	Report (in Chinese)

Huangshi Stadium, Huangshi

Oct. 7th, 2012
14:30 UTC+8

Beijing Yitong Kuche	1 - 1	Shenzhen Fengpeng
Yu Shuai 23'	Report (in Chinese)	55' Yang Jian

Beijing Fengtai Stadium, Beijing

Oct. 8th, 2012
14:30 UTC+8

Shaanxi Laochenggen	0 - 0	Guizhou Zhicheng
	Report (in Chinese)

Shaanxi Province Stadium, Xi'an

Oct. 8th, 2012
14:30 UTC+8

Kunming Ruilong	2 - 1	Qinghai Senke
Wang Jianwen 62'; Ma Sai 68' (pen.)	Report (in Chinese)	72' (o.g.) Liu Pujin

Kunming Hongta Base #4 Field, Kunming

==== Second leg ====
Oct. 12th, 2012
14:30 UTC+8

Hebei Zhongji	1 - 1	Hubei China-Kyle
Jia Xiaochen 90'	Report (in Chinese)	87' Zhou Yi

Yutong International Sports Center, Shijiazhuang

Oct. 12th, 2012
14:30 UTC+8

Shenzhen Fengpeng	2 - 1	Beijing Yitong Kuche
Li Yingjian 22'; Chen Yongran 74'	Report (in Chinese)	11' Wu Hao

University Town of Shenzhen Stadium, Shenzhen

Oct. 13th, 2012
14:30 UTC+8

Qinghai Senke	2 - 0	Kunming Ruilong
Huang Jie 63'; Teng Bin 75'	Report (in Chinese)

Xining Ximen Stadium, Xining

Oct. 13th, 2012
14:30 UTC+8

Guizhou Zhicheng	2 - 0	Shaanxi Laochenggen
Feng Kai 65'; Jiang Liang 90'	Report (in Chinese)

Guizhou Provincial Stadium, Guiyang

=== Semi-finals ===
Team 1	Agg.	Team 2	1st leg	2nd leg
Hubei China-Kyle	2 - 1	Shenzhen Fengpeng	0 - 1	2 - 0
Guizhou Zhicheng	4 - 3	Qinghai Senke	2 - 2	2 - 1

==== First leg ====
Oct. 18th, 2012
14:30 UTC+8

Shenzhen Fengpeng	1 - 0	Hubei China-Kyle
Chen Yongran 58'	Report(in Chinese)

University Town of Shenzhen Stadium, Shenzhen

Oct. 19th, 2012
14:30 UTC+8

Qinghai Senke	2 - 2	Guizhou Zhicheng
Xu Yihai 15'; Teng Bin (pen.)	Report(in Chinese)	50' Jiang Liang; 65' Tang Yuan

Xining Ximen Stadium, Xining

==== Second leg ====
Oct. 23rd, 2012
14:30 UTC+8

Hubei China-Kyle	2 - 0 (a.e.t.)	Shenzhen Fengpeng
Tong Xiaoxing 90+4'; Dong Zhiyuan 115'	Report(in Chinese)

Huangshi Stadium, Huangshi
Referee: Ma Li

Oct. 24th, 2012
14:30 UTC+8

Guizhou Zhicheng	2 - 1	Qinghai Senke
Chen Xiao 75'; Ilhamjan Iminjan 90+3'	Report(in Chinese)	60'

Guizhou Provincial Stadium, Guiyang

=== Third-place play-off ===
Team 1	Agg.	Team 2	1st leg	2nd leg
Shenzhen Fengpeng	4 - 2	Qinghai Senke	3 - 0	1 - 2

==== First leg ====
Oct. 29th, 2012
14:30 UTC+8

Shenzhen Fengpeng	3 - 0	Qinghai Senke
Wu Lei 30', 35'; Di You 49' (pen.)	Report(in Chinese)

University Town of Shenzhen Stadium, Shenzhen

==== Second leg ====
Nov. 4th, 2012
14:30 UTC+8

Qinghai Senke	2 - 1	Shenzhen Fengpeng
Shi Jun 40' (pen.); Xu Yihai 80'	Report(in Chinese)	76' Liu Xi

Xining Ximen Stadium, Xining

=== Final ===
Team 1	Agg.	Team 2	1st leg	2nd leg
Hubei China-Kyle	1 - 2	Guizhou Zhicheng	1 - 0	0 - 2

==== First leg ====
Oct. 30th, 2012
14:30 UTC+8

Hubei China-Kyle	1 - 0	Guizhou Zhicheng
Li Longri 39'	Report(in Chinese)

Huangshi Stadium, Huangshi

==== Second leg ====
Nov. 5th, 2012
14:30 UTC+8

Guizhou Zhicheng	2 - 0	Hubei China-Kyle
Ilhamjan Iminjan 50'; Jiang Liang 68'	Report(in Chinese)

Guizhou Provincial Stadium, Guiyang

== Top scorers ==
Rank	Player	Club	Goals
1	(China) Zhang Hongbin	Beijing Yitong Kuche	18
2	(China) Fan Yunlong	Guizhou Zhicheng	15
2	(China) Xu Yihai	Qinghai Senke	15
4	(China) Teng Bin	Qinghai Senke	13
5	(China) Ilhamjan Iminjan	Guizhou Zhicheng	12
5	(China) Jiang Zhongxiao	Shaanxi Daqin	12
7	(China) Wu Dingmao	Shanxi Jiayi	11
8	(China) He Lilong	Beijing Youth	10
8	(China) Wang Shangyuan	Beijing Sangao	10
10	(China) Xu Xin	Jiangxi Liansheng	9
10	(China) Yang Chaosheng	Dongguan Nancheng	9
10	(China) Liu Yang	Shaanxi Laochenggen	9

== League Attendance ==
=== North Group ===
Pos	Team	Total	High	Low	Average	Change
1	Xinjiang Begonia	172,763	45,000	12,000	28,794	n/a
2	Hebei Zhongji	28,700	6,000	3,000	4,783	n/a
3	Shaanxi Laochenggen	21,720	5,000	800	3,620	n/a
4	Hebei Youth	9,268	5,500	500	1,324	n/a
5	Qinghai Senke	7,880	1,800	1,000	1,313	n/a
6	Shanxi Jiayi	7,150	2,500	200	715	n/a
7	Shandong Youth	3,333	1,000	200	476	n/a
8	Qinghai Youth	3,110	1,500	100	346	n/a
9	Beijing Yitong Kuche	2,427	1,200	150	405	n/a
10	Beijing Youth	1,733	430	0	217	n/a
11	Beijing Sangao	805	192	0	134	n/a
12	Shanghai Zobon	785	200	185	196	n/a
13	Tianjin Huochetou	715	200	30	89	n/a
	League total	260,389	45,000	0	2,926	n/a

Updated to games played on Sept. 2nd, 2012 (Round 21)
Source: China League Two bulletin data (in Chinese)

There is no attendance data for Round 1, 2, 8, 13, 15, 18, 22, 23 and 24.

=== South Group ===
Pos	Team	Total	High	Low	Average	Change
1	Guizhou Zhicheng	24,517	3,670	1,003	2,229	n/a
2	Shaanxi Daqin	19,159	4,186	400	2,395	n/a
3	Hubei China-Kyle	18,095	3,000	368	1,645	n/a
4	Dongguan Nancheng	16,373	5,630	112	1,488	n/a
5	Shenzhen Fengpeng	9,786	1,980	131	890	n/a
6	Jiangxi Liansheng	8,505	5,225	150	1,063	n/a
7	Kunming Ruilong	7,305	3,000	200	913	n/a
8	Chongqing Youth	7,032	3,615	100	781	n/a
9	Shenzhen Main Sports	4,990	2,200	0	499	n/a
10	Sichuan F.C.	3,849	500	50	321	n/a
11	Jiangsu HHU	2,246	500	100	250	n/a
12	Hubei Youth	1,701	500	50	155	n/a
13	Guangdong Youth	1,361	500	0	124	n/a
	League total	124,919	5,630	0	961	n/a

Updated to games played on Sept. 19th, 2012 (Round 24)
Source: China League Two bulletin data (in Chinese)

There is no attendance data for Round 13 and 23.
