= Yves Ekwalla Herman =

Cameroonian footballer

Ekwalla Herman
Personal information
- Full name: Yves Hermann Ekwala
- Date of birth: 9 May 1990 (age 36) or 9 July 1985
- Place of birth: Douala, Cameroon
- Height: 1.86 m (6 ft 1 in)
- Position: Forward

Senior career*
Years	Team	Apps	(Gls)
2009–2010	Union Douala	50	(1)
2011–2012	Buriram United	30	(3)
2013	Chongqing Lifan	27	(4)
2014	Qingdao Hainiu	26	(9)
2015–2016	Guizhou Zhicheng	54	(28)
2017	Xinjiang Tianshan Leopard	24	(10)
2018	Dalian Transcendence	5	(0)
2022	CS Lanaudière-Nord	1	(0)
- * Club domestic league appearances and goals as of 31 December 2022

Yves Hermann Ekwala (born May 9, 1990 or 9 July 1985) is a Cameroonian professional footballer who plays as a forward.

== Club career ==
Hermann began his professional career with top tier Cameroonian side Union Douala in 2009. He joined Thai Premier League club Buriram United in 2011 and would have a successful period with the team by winning the league and FA Cup with them.

He signed a contract with China League One side Chongqing Lifan on 22 January 2013. He moved to another League One club Qingdao Hainiu in January 2014.

He was moved to the reserve squad of Dalian Transcendence on 15 July 2018.
