= Julio Andrés Gutiérrez =

Uruguayan footballer (born 1983)

Julio Andrés Gutiérrez Cassou (Latin American Spanish: [ˈxuljo anˈdɾes ɣuˈtjeres], born August 18, 1983 in Montevideo) is a Uruguayan retired footballer who played as a defensive midfielder.

== Teams ==
- (Uruguay) River Plate 2001–2007
- (Uruguay) Rentistas 2007–2008
- (Uruguay) River Plate 2009
- (Uruguay) Rentistas 2009–2010
- (Uruguay) El Tanque Sisley 2010–2011
- (China) B.I.T. 2011
- (Uruguay) Cerro Largo FC 2012
- (China) Wuhan Zall 2012
- (Uruguay) Defensor Sporting 2013
- (Uruguay) Rampla Juniors 2013
- (China) B.I.T. 2014–2015
- (China) Qingdao Hainiu 2015
