= Dragan Stančić =

Serbian footballer (born 1982)

Personal information
- Date of birth: February 12, 1982 (age 44)
- Place of birth: Obrenovac, SFR Yugoslavia
- Height: 1.82 m (6 ft 0 in)
- Position: Midfielder

Senior career*
Years	Team	Apps	(Gls)
1998–2000	Radnički Obrenovac		
2000–2004	OFK Beograd	67	(1)
2004–2005	Red Star Belgrade	6	(0)
2005–2006	OFK Beograd	23	(0)
2006–2007	Hajduk Kula	13	(1)
2007–2008	Red Star Belgrade	0	(0)
2008	→ Qingdao Jonoon (loan)	26	(0)
2009	Nanjing Yoyo	8	(0)
2009	Qingdao Jonoon	14	(0)
2010	Nanjing Yoyo	18	(0)
2011	Guizhou Zhicheng	19	(0)

International career
- Serbia and Montenegro U19
- Serbia U21

Managerial career
- 2014–2016: Qingdao Jonoon (assistant)
- 2015: Qingdao Jonoon (caretaker)
- 2017: Zhenjiang Huasa (caretaker)
- 2019: Hunan Billows
- 2022–2023: Jinan Xingzhou (assistant)
- 2024: Hunan Billows (assistant)
- 2025–2026: Ganzhou Ruishi
Medal record
Silver medal – second place	UEFA Under-21 Championship	2004
- * Club domestic league appearances and goals

Dragan Stančić (Serbian Cyrillic: Драган Станчић; born February 12, 1982), also known as "Feng Jinlong" (Chinese: 冯金龙) in China, is a Serbian football coach and former player.

== Career ==
Stančić was a member of the Serbian under-19 and under-21 teams and was part of the Serbia U21 that played in the 2004 UEFA European Under-21 Football Championship. He started his career at Red Star Belgrade before playing for OFK Belgrade and later Hajduk Kula, only to come back to where he started, at Red Star prior to the 2007-08 Serbian Superliga season.

He moved to China and joined Qingdao Jonoon in 2008.

== External sources ==
- Dragan Stančić at WorldFootball.net
- Profile and stats until 2003 at Dekisa.Tripod.
