= Xinjiang Begonia F.C. =

Chinese football club

Xinjiang Begonia 新疆海棠
- Full name: Xinjiang Begonia Football Club 新疆海棠足球俱乐部
- Founded: 28 May 2010; 15 years ago
- Ground: Xinjiang Sports Centre
- Capacity: 50,000
- Owner(s): Xiyu Group; Xinjiang Zhaori Group
- Chairman: Yang Quanbin (杨全斌)
- Manager: Sergey Gorokhovodatskiy (谢尔盖)
- League: China League Two
- 2012: 4th (North Group)
Home colours	Away colours

Xinjiang Begonia Football Club (Simplified Chinese: 新疆海棠足球俱乐部) was a Chinese football club based in Xinjiang. They competed in the China League Two.

== History ==
Xinjiang Begonia was found in February 2012 by Xiyu Group and Xinjiang Zhaori Group. The team kicked off its career within China League Two, the third-tier league of the chinese football league system, during the 2012 league season. The team started off the season with a great 5-game undefeated start, winning three and tied two without letting in one goal. However, they failed to finish within the top four of the north group, and ended up fifth, missing both the playoffs and the chance of advancing to China League One.

The team will not compete in the 2013 season. However, with the decent start to the league the team was able to pull off, the team hopes to achieve China League One in the near future, and hopefully China Super League to potentially promote football in Xinjiang.

== All-time league rankings ==
Season	2012
Division	3
Position	5

- ^1 in North Group

== Staff ==
Position	Staff
Head coach	(Kazakhstan) Sergey Gorokhovodatskiy
Assistant coach	(China) Parhat Armat
Athletic doctor	(China) Li Jie (李捷)
Trainers	(China) Qu Wenhu (曲文湖)

Source: SoSo Baike
