= Shenzhen Fengpeng F.C. =

Shenzhen Fengpeng Shēnzhèn Fēngpéng 深圳风鹏
- Full name: Shenzhen Fengpeng Football Club 深圳风鹏足球俱乐部
- Founded: January 2012
- Dissolved: November 2013 (12 years ago)
- Ground: Universiade Center, Shenzhen, Guangdong, China PR
- Capacity: 60,334
Home colours	Away colours

Shenzhen Fengpeng Football Club
- Traditional Chinese: 深圳風鵬足球俱樂部
- Simplified Chinese: 深圳风鹏足球俱乐部
Transcriptions
Standard Mandarin
- Hanyu Pinyin: Shēnzhèn Fēngpéng Zúqiú Jùlèbù
Yue: Cantonese
- Jyutping: sam1 zan3 fung1 paang4 zuk1 kau4 keoi1 lok6 bou6

Shenzhen Fengpeng
- Traditional Chinese: 深圳風鵬
- Simplified Chinese: 深圳风鹏
Transcriptions
Standard Mandarin
- Hanyu Pinyin: Shēnzhèn Fēngpéng
Yue: Cantonese
- Jyutping: sam1 zan3 fung1 paang4

Shenzhen Fengpeng Football Club (Chinese: 深圳风鹏; pinyin: Shēnzhèn Fēngpéng) was a football club based in Shenzhen, Guangdong, China.

== History ==
Shenzhen Fengpeng was established in January 2012 by former Shenzhen Ruby F.C. players and staffs including Sun Gang as managerial director, Fan Yuhong as general manager, Liu Jianjiang and Li Yuanping as coach, and Zhang Jun as manager, under the financial support of anonymous local housing property corp and other investors including representative closed to former Shenzhen Ruby and JianLiBao corp owner Zhang Hai. The squad was assembled with former players from Shenzhen Ruby first and youth teams, notably the three veterans Yuan Lin, Chen Yongqiang and Xiao Jianjia, Fan Yuhong's Nanshan Academy (the 2nd graduates, born in 1993 to 1994 and have been representing Shenzhen in various teenage competitions), and former players of Hubei Province clubs where manager Zhang Jun is from and has many connections with. The club's name Fengpeng (风鹏) came from the phrase "大风将起, 鹏程万里", meaning "Strong wind ("Feng") is about to blow, (and we will have) a bright future as roc (Peng). Roc also refers to Shenzhen as nickname of the city (PengCheng, city of roc). They joined China League Two, third tier of Chinese football league system in the 2012 league season.

Fengpeng's first season was very largely restricted by the lack of goalscoring force. Zhang Jun's designated direct tactic to fit the three towering target men who have experience at higher-tier league didn't work very well, despite the team was solid in defense and threatening in set-pieces. Two wingers, as summer loan signing were brought in accordingly to solve the jam of firepower efficiently. Fengpeng finished the season with a 7 match unbeaten pursuit towards the top 4 play-off spots, ended as runner-up in southern group in the end.

In the intense 2-round play-off, Fengpeng passed Beijing Yitong Kuche in quarter final with second round played at home. However the fortune twisted at the last step from promotion, in the 2nd round of play-off semi final away at Huangshi against Hubei China-Kyle, a bitter rival throughout the year who Fengpeng won 3 and drew 1 in different occasions. The team received hostile reception from local fans due to Zhang Jun's past history of some controversial occasions during his playing time at Hubei Province. Fans stormed into training session to verbally pressurize Zhang Jun and offered him strong alcohol drinks as the price for them to leave. The night before the match, fireworks was set out around Fengpeng's resident hotel for disruption of sleep. During the match, Fengpeng lost their most threatening and tactically valuable target man Yang Changpeng, who is also from Hubei and played in local clubs before, from an unnecessary incident overreacted by both sides and even the referees. Yang ran to an opposition player to get the ball from his possession for set piece in a dead-ball occasion, and received aggressively physical reaction. The subsequent red card shown by the referee tipped off fierce reaction from Hubei players, coaches and fans. Under threatening pressure the referee sent off Yang as well in regard of some of his very slightest movement spotted by linesman as violent conduct. Without Yang's tactical position Fengpeng had to sit back passively to desperately defend their aggregate 1-goal lead from 1st round at home, despite both playing 10 men, still conceded in the very last minute of an extended 2nd half stoppage time, and then again a few minutes before the end of extra time and fight-back chance in penalty shootout.

Zhang Jun served his pre-season swear of "promotion or my resignation", and was succeeded by another Shenzhen based coach, also former international, Zhu Bo, who recruited 13 new players after losing the majority of the 1st team of 2012 season to transfer market and retirements to rebuild a new team for a much more competitive season of 2013.

== All-time league rankings ==
Season	2012	2013
Division	3	3
Position	3	3
