= Guizhou Provincial Stadium =

Sports venue in Guiyang, China

Coordinates: 26°33′54″N 106°41′48″E

Guizhou Provincial Stadium (Simplified Chinese: 贵州省体育场) is an 18,000-capacity multi-use stadium in Guiyang, Guizhou, China. It is currently used mostly for football matches.
