= Xinjiang Tianshan Leopard F.C. =

Chinese football club

Xinjiang Tianshan Leopard Xīnjiāng Tiānshān Xuěbào 新疆天山雪豹/شىنجاڭ قار لەيلىسى
- Full name: Xinjiang Tianshan Leopard Football Club 新疆天山雪豹足球俱乐部
- Founded: 2014; 12 years ago
- Dissolved: 21 February 2023; 3 years ago
- Ground: Xinjiang Sports Centre, Ürümqi, Xinjiang, China PR
- Capacity: 42,300
- Owner: Urumqi Juntai Real Estate Co. Ltd.
- Chairman: Li Jianzhong (李建忠)

Xinjiang Tianshan Leopard F.C. (Chinese: 新疆天山雪豹; pinyin: Xīnjiāng Tiānshān Xuěbào) is a defunct professional Chinese football club that participated in the China League One division under licence from the Chinese Football Association (CFA). The team was based in Ürümqi, Xinjiang. Their majority shareholder was the Ürümqi Juntai Real Estate Co., Ltd. (Juntai Group)

The club dissolved in February 2023.

== History ==
Hubei China-Kyle was established in December 2011 by the China-Kyle Special Steel Co., Ltd and they brought in Li Jianzhong (李建忠) as their chairman as well as Li Jun (李军) as their first manager. With the aid from the Hubei Football Association they formed a team and registered to play within the third tier of the Chinese football league system in the 2012 league season. Their home location was the Huangshi Stadium and all blue was chosen as their home uniform. In their debut season they finished fourth place in the South Group and advanced into the play-offs where after beating Hebei Zhongji and Shenzhen Fengpeng they ultimately came runners-up to Guizhou Zhicheng within the division, nonetheless that position ensured promotion to the China League One division.

In their first appearance within the second division the club would struggle with the higher level of finance and professionalism required within the division. Before the start of the season the team could not afford the plane tickets required to go their training camp set in Dongguan, Guangdong and had to go there by coach. Despite the financial constraints Li Jun was able to avoid relegation on the final day of the season when the team beat Chengdu Tiancheng 2–0 at home. At the start of the 2014 league season the club would publicly declare they were looking for investment and were willing to leave Hubei Province to obtain it. This saw speculation grow that the club were going to move to Xi'an, but talks between the city broke down. The Xinjiang Uygur Autonomous Region Sports Bureau, however would express interest in investing into the club, which initially saw them take over their Under-20 team. On 14 February 2014 the Xinjiang Uygur Autonomous Region Sports Bureau followed through with their investment by providing the Xinjiang Sports Centre, training facilities and sponsorship, which saw Hubei China-Kyle moved to Xinjiang's capital city Ürümqi and changed their name to Xinjiang Tianshan Leopard. The club would gain sponsorship from local real estate company Ürümqi Juntai Real Estate Co., Ltd. (Juntai Group) who decided to become the club's main investor throughout the season.

In the 2018 China League One, Xinjiang suffered a shock as they finished last in the division, but due to the dissolution of Dalian Transcendence and Yanbian Funde, and Zhejiang Yiteng being unable to apply for a League One license, Xinjiang miraculously managed to stay afloat in the League One.

== Name history ==
- 2011–2013 as Hubei China-Kyle F.C. 湖北华凯尔
- 2014–2023 as Xinjiang Tianshan Leopard 新疆天山雪豹

== Managerial history ==
- (China) Li Jun (2012–2018)
- (Belgium) Paul Put (2018)
- (Spain) Fernando (2019–2020)
- (China) Polat Kutulk (caretaker) (2020)
- (China) Pei Encai (2021–2022)

== Results ==
All-time league rankings

As of the end of 2022 season.

Year	Div	Pld	W	D	L	GF	GA	GD	Pts	Pos.	FA Cup	Super Cup	AFC	Att./G	Stadium
2012	3	30	15	7	8	32	22	10	44^{1}	RU	DNE	DNQ	DNQ	1,645	Huangshi Stadium
2013	2	30	8	6	16	27	41	−14	30	13	R2	DNQ	DNQ	2,206	Huangshi Stadium
2014	2	30	8	11	11	29	33	−4	35	11	R2	DNQ	DNQ	3,161	Xinjiang Sports Centre
2015	2	30	10	9	11	43	51	−8	39	8	QF	DNQ	DNQ	4,114	Xinjiang Sports Centre
2016	2	30	11	6	13	31	36	−5	39	11	R3	DNQ	DNQ	2,615	Xinjiang Sports Centre
2017	2	30	9	8	13	37	52	−15	35	11	R2	DNQ	DNQ	2,450	Xinjiang Sports Centre
2018	2	30	3	9	18	24	61	−37	18	16	R3	DNQ	DNQ	1,246	Hongshan Stadium
2019	2	30	9	6	15	39	55	-16	33	13	R3	DNQ	DNQ	3,565	Xinjiang Sports Centre
2020	2	15	0	6	9	10	23	-13	6	18	DNQ	DNQ	DNQ		
2021	2	34	1	6	27	16	84	-68	9	18	R3	DNQ	DNQ		
2022	2	34	6	3	25	31	83	-52	21	17	R1	DNQ	DNQ		

- ^1 In group stage.

Key

	China top division
	China second division
	China third division
W	Winners
RU	Runners-up
3	Third place
	Relegated

- Pld = Played
- W = Games won
- D = Games drawn
- L = Games lost
- F = Goals for
- A = Goals against
- Pts = Points
- Pos = Final position
- DNQ = Did not qualify
- DNE = Did not enter
- NH = Not Held
- – = Does Not Exist
- R1 = Round 1
- R2 = Round 2
- R3 = Round 3
- R4 = Round 4
- F = Final
- SF = Semi-finals
- QF = Quarter-finals
- R16 = Round of 16
- Group = Group stage
- GS2 = Second Group stage
- QR1 = First Qualifying Round
- QR2 = Second Qualifying Round
- QR3 = Third Qualifying Round
