= Xinjiang Sports Centre =

Sports venue in Ürümqi, China

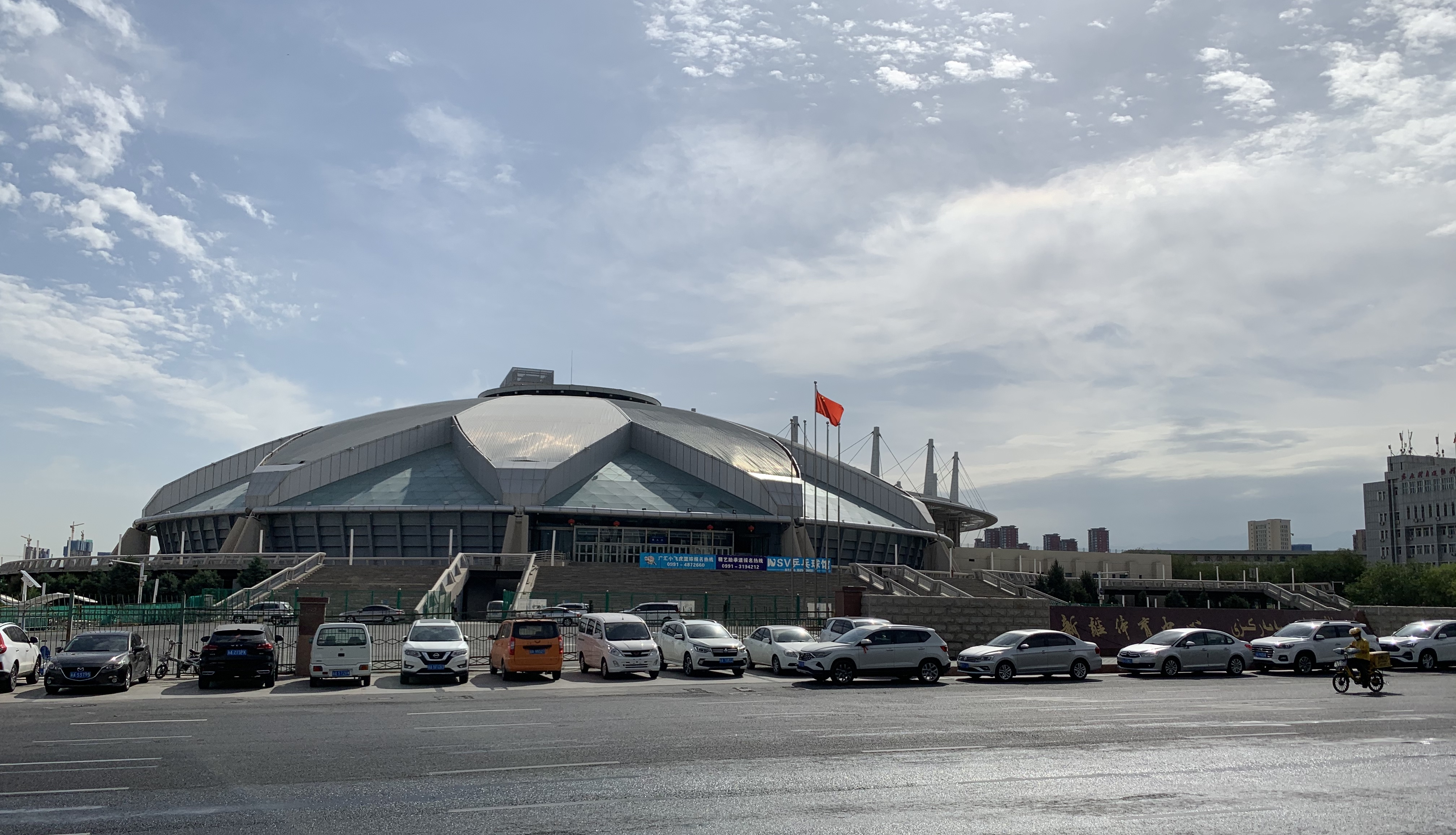
- Interactive map of Xinjiang Sports Centre
- Location: Urumqi, Xinjiang, China
- Coordinates: 43°52′45″N 87°33′30″E
- Public transit: 1 at Sports Center

Tenants
- Xinjiang Tianshan Leopard; Chinese Athletic Association

The Xinjiang Sports Centre Stadium at the Xinjiang Sports Centre (Chinese: 新疆体育中心; Uyghur: شىنجاڭ تەنتەربىيە مەركىزى, romanized: Shinjang tenterbiye merkizi) is a multi-purpose stadium in Urumqi, Xinjiang, China. It is the biggest stadium in Xinjiang, having 42,300 seats.

== Construction and use ==
Originally built in Tianshan district of Urumqi, it was built in the 1950s-1960s. In the 1990s, two gyms within the stadium were deemed to be high risk buildings, the Urumqi sports administration decided to rebuild the stadium on new land, the old stadium was auctioned off for 450 million CNY.

Designed by Beijing Institute of Architectural Design in collaboration with the Xinjiang No. 4 Construction Group, Construction officially begun in April 2001. Construction was officially completed in 2005.

== See also ==
- Sports in China
