= Guizhou F.C. =

Chinese football club

Guizhou Guìzhōu Héngfēng 贵州队
- Full name: Guizhou Football Club 贵州足球俱乐部
- Founded: 1992; 34 years ago (amateur); 18 February 2005; 21 years ago (professional)
- Dissolved: June 2022; 4 years ago
- Ground: Guiyang Olympic Sports Center, Guiyang
- Capacity: 51,636
Home colours	Away colours

Guizhou Football Club (simplified Chinese: 贵州足球俱乐部; traditional Chinese: 貴州足球俱樂部; pinyin: Guìzhōu Zúqiú Jùlèbù; Mandarin pronunciation: [kwêi ʈʂóu xə̌ŋ.fə́ŋ.tsǔ tɕʰjǒu tɕŷ lɤ̂ pû]) was a professional Chinese football club. The team was based in Guiyang, Guizhou and their home stadium was the 51,636 seater Guiyang Olympic Sports Center. Their majority shareholders were Hengfeng Real Estate, Guizhou Zhicheng Enterprise Group Investment Co., Ltd. and the Guizhou Provincial Sports Bureau.

== History ==
On 18 February 2005 the Guizhou Provincial Sports Bureau and Guizhou Zhicheng Enterprise Group Investment Co., Ltd. took over and re-established the Guizhou Province football team as a youth team after paying the membership fee of 600,000 Yuan to the Chinese Football Association. After playing within the youth leagues for several seasons the club decided the team's players were old enough to enter the senior football league. They entered in the third tier at the beginning of the 2008 league season where they came fourth within the Southern league and entered the play-offs where they were knocked out in the quarter-finals. They would achieve the same feat the following season but this time go one better by being knocked out in the second round of the play-offs.

In the 2010 league season the team finished third within the league and missed out on promotion, however despite this the owners decided to take over second-tier football club Shanghai Zobon's registration for 5 million Yuan and their place within the division. At the beginning of the season Wang Haifang (王海芳) was brought in to manage the team and initial results under his reign saw the club briefly push for promotion until on 3 June 2011 he died in a car accident. Zhang Ning (张宁) was brought in as his replacement, however results plummeted and Yuan Yi (袁弋) came in but he was unable to stop the club from relegation after they lost a relegation play-off to Fujian Smart Hero. In the following season the club was immediately able to bounce back and went on to win the 2012 China League Two division. Yuan Yi would decide to leave as manager of the club and on 28 May 2013 Arie Schans from the Netherlands would become the club's first foreign coach. His introduction could not amend the club's disappointing start to the season and the team would go through a 14-game winless streak within the league, which ultimately contributed to their relegation.

In the 2014 league season, Zhang Jun was brought in as the club's Head coach where he led the club to a third-place finish and just outside promotion, however second-tier club Shenyang Zhongze F.C. officially dissolved on 27 February 2015, unexpectedly freeing a space within the league, which Guizhou took. Chen Mao was brought in as Head Coach for the start of the 2015 league season and was able to keep the team within the division for the first time within the club's history. This saw Hengfeng Real Estate (Chinese: 贵州恒丰伟业房地产开发有限公司, in short 恒丰地产) interested in becoming a majority owner of the club, which they completed on January 8, 2016. A new club badge would be introduced to reflect the name change to Guizhou Hengfeng Zhicheng F.C. and the club's home colours were changed from green to white. In the 2016 China League One, the team, which had never ranked above 13th before, went all the way to rank second, earning the most surprising promotion to the Chinese Super League in years, making up for the departure of Beijing Renhe from Guizhou to Beijing that same year.

In December 2017, the club changed their name to Guizhou Hengfeng F.C. They finished eighth in the 2017 Super League in their first season, in what was considered a surprisingly good finish. In 2018, they finished last in the Super League, causing them to be demoted to the 2019 China League One two years after promotion to the top league. In the 2019 China League One they were two points short of second place and promotion back to the Super League after one year.

Guizhou was dissolved after the 2021 season.

== Name history ==
- 1992–2015 Guizhou Zhicheng F.C. 贵州智诚
- 2016–2017 Guizhou Hengfeng Zhicheng F.C. 贵州恒丰智诚
- 2018–2020 Guizhou Hengfeng F.C. 贵州恒丰
- 2021 Guizhou F.C. 贵州队

== Coaching staff ==
Position	Staff
Head coach	(China) Yuan Yi
Assistant coach	
Fitness coach	
Goalkeeper coach	

Source: sina.com.cn

=== Managerial history ===
- (China) Wang Fang (2008)
- (China) Wang Haifang (2011–3 June 2011)
- (China) Zhang Ning (3 June 2011 – 2011)
- (China) Yuan Yi (2011–27 May 2013)
- (Netherlands) Arie Schans (28 May 2013– 2014)
- (China) Zhang Jun (2014–31 December 2014)
- (China) Chen Mao (29 January 2015 – 7 April 2016)
- (China) Li Bing (caretaker) (7 April 2016 – 4 May 2017)
- (Spain) Gregorio Manzano (4 May 2017 – 7 June 2018)
- (Romania) Dan Petrescu (7 June 2018 – 23 March 2019)
- (China) Hao Haitao (9 April 2019 – 19 June 2019)
- (China) Chen Mao (19 June 2019 – 26 November 2019)
- (China) Wang Xinxin (26 November 2019 – 13 October 2020)
- (China) Chen Mao (13 October 2020 – 27 November 2021)
- (China) Yuan Yi (27 November 2021 – 31 December 2021)

== Honours ==
- China League Two (tier-III)
  - Champions (1): 2012

== Results ==
All-time League Rankings

- As of the end of 2021 season.

Year	Div	Pld	W	D	L	GF	GA	GD	Pts	Pos.	FA Cup	Super Cup	AFC	Att./G	Stadium
2008	3	14	7	5	3	22	17	+5	25 ^{1}	8	NH	DNQ	DNQ		Guizhou Provincial Stadium
2009	3	10	3	5	2	9	4	+5	14 ^{1}	5	NH	DNQ	DNQ		Guizhou Provincial Stadium
2010	3	16	4	9	3	16	12	+4	21 ^{1}	3	NH	DNQ	DNQ		Guizhou Provincial Stadium
2011	2	26	4	8	14	15	28	−13	20	14	R1	DNQ	DNQ		Guizhou Provincial Stadium
2012	3	24	16	6	2	51	16	+35	54 ^{1}	W	R3	DNQ	DNQ	2,229	Guizhou Provincial Stadium
2013	2	30	5	11	4	29	45	−16	26	16	R2	DNQ	DNQ	2,618	Guizhou Provincial Stadium
2014	3	16	11	3	2	35	9	+26	36 ^{1}	3	R3	DNQ	DNQ		Guizhou Provincial Stadium
2015	2	30	8	6	16	39	55	−16	30	13	R3	DNQ	DNQ	1,871	Guizhou Provincial Stadium
2016	2	30	18	5	7	48	27	21	59	RU	R2	DNQ	DNQ	11,089	Guiyang Olympic Sports Center
2017	1	30	12	6	12	39	45	−6	42	8	R3	DNQ	DNQ	21,102	Guiyang Olympic Sports Center
2018	1	30	7	3	20	34	66	−32	24	16	QF	DNQ	DNQ	16,703	Guiyang Olympic Sports Center
2019	2	30	17	3	10	46	28	+18	54	3	R3	DNQ	DNQ		Guiyang Olympic Sports Center
2020	2	15	6	4	5	20	16	+4	22	7	R2	DNQ	DNQ		
2021	2	34	10	9	15	26	56	-30	39	12	R3	DNQ	DNQ		

- ^1 In group stage.

Key

	China top division
	China second division
	China third division
W	Champions
RU	Runners-up
3	Third place
	Relegated

- Pld = Played
- W = Games won
- D = Games drawn
- L = Games lost
- F = Goals for
- A = Goals against
- Pts = Points
- Pos = Final position
- DNQ = Did not qualify
- DNE = Did not enter
- NH = Not Held
- - = Does Not Exist
- R1 = Round 1
- R2 = Round 2
- R3 = Round 3
- R4 = Round 4
- F = Final
- SF = Semi-finals
- QF = Quarter-finals
- R16 = Round of 16
- Group = Group stage
- GS2 = Second Group stage
- QR1 = First Qualifying Round
- QR2 = Second Qualifying Round
- QR3 = Third Qualifying Round

== Notable players ==
These players had international caps for their respective countries.

Africa

Cameroon

- (Cameroon) Yves Ekwalla Hermann (2015–2016)

Egypt

- (Egypt) Ali Ghazal (2017)

Ivory Coast

- (Ivory Coast) Kevin Boli (2018–2020)

Gambia

- (The Gambia) Bubacarr Trawally (2018)

Kenya

- (Kenya) Michael Olunga (2017–2018)

Asia

Australia

- (Australia) Ryan McGowan (2017)

Hong Kong

- (Hong Kong) Festus Baise (2016–2019)
- (Hong Kong) Au Yeung Yiu Chung (2016–2018)

Central & North America

Canada

- (Canada) Mason Trafford (2013)

Honduras

- (Honduras) Carlo Costly (2013)

Europe

Albania

- (Albania) Jahmir Hyka (2020-)

Bosnia and Herzegovina

- (Bosnia and Herzegovina) Ivan Božić (2013)

Croatia

- (Croatia) Nikica Jelavić (2018–2020)
- (Croatia) Anton Maglica (2019-)

Netherlands

- (Netherlands) Tjaronn Chery (2017–2019)

Serbia

- (Serbia) Dragan Stančić (2011)
- (Serbia) Stefan Mihajlović (2020–2021)

Spain

- (Spain) Mario Suárez (2017–2018)
- (Spain) Ibán Cuadrado (2015–2016)

South America

Brazil

- (Brazil) Sérgio Mota (2019–2021)
- (Brazil) Mazola (2016–2017)
