= Mu Pengfei =

Chinese footballer

Mu Pengfei 牟鹏飞
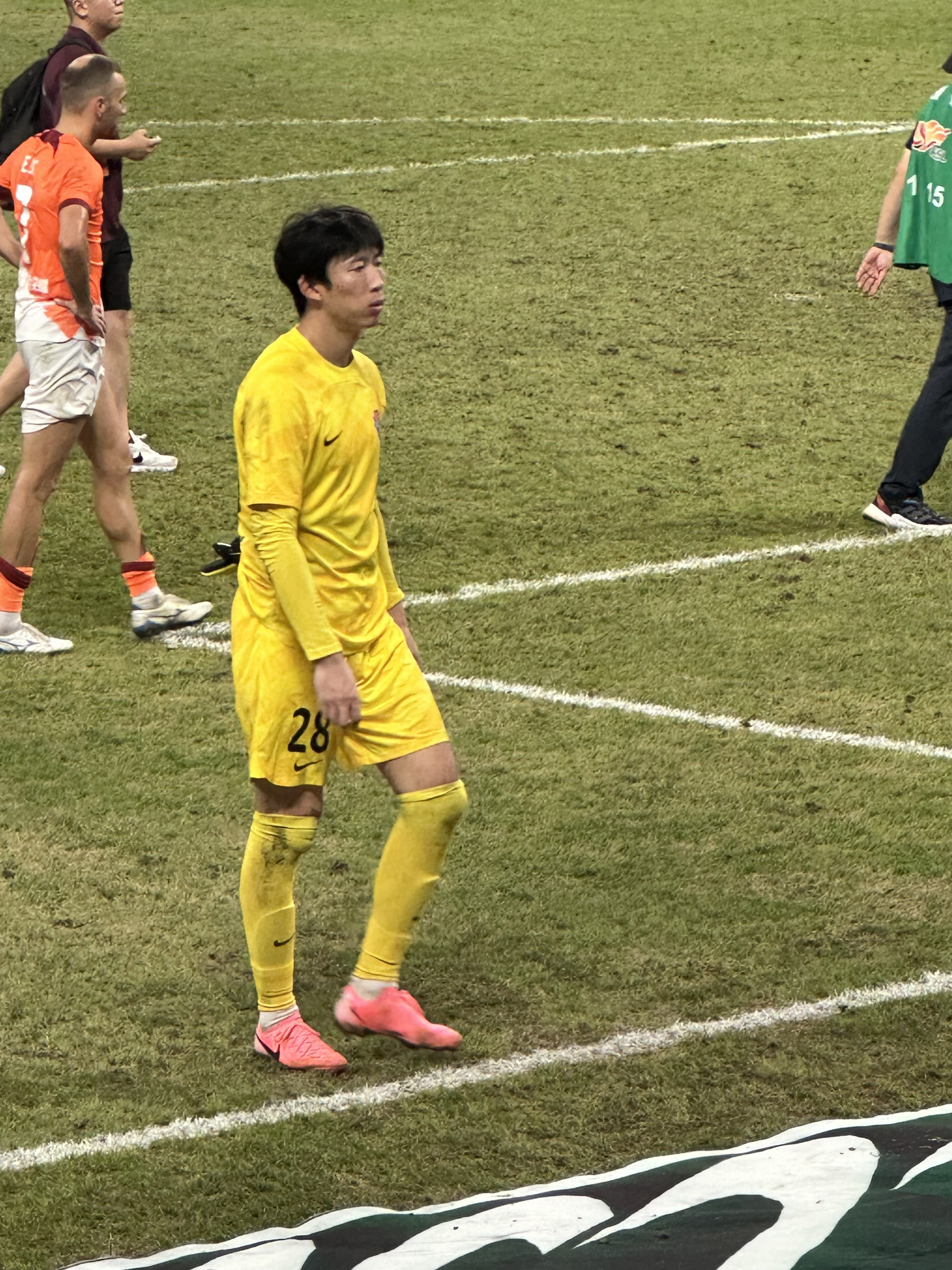
- Mu Pengfei in August 2024

Personal information
- Full name: Mu Pengfei
- Date of birth: 28 February 1989 (age 37)
- Place of birth: Qingdao, Shandong, China
- Height: 1.85 m (6 ft 1 in)
- Position: Goalkeeper

Team information
- Current team: Qingdao Hainiu
- Number: 28

Youth career
- Qingdao Hailifeng

Senior career*
Years	Team	Apps	(Gls)
2007–2009	Qingdao Hailifeng	14	(0)
2010	Shaanxi Renhe	0	(0)
2011–2016	Qingdao Jonoon	45	(0)
2017–2018	Heilongjiang Lava Spring	57	(0)
2019	Beijing Renhe	11	(0)
2020–2021	Shenyang Urban	1	(0)
2021–	Qingdao Hainiu	162	(0)
- * Club domestic league appearances and goals as of 22 November 2026

Mu Pengfei (Chinese: 牟鹏飞; pinyin: Mù Péngfēi; born 28 February 1989) is a Chinese professional footballer who plays as a goalkeeper for and captains Chinese Super League club Qingdao Hainiu.

== Club career ==
Mu joined Qingdao Hailifeng's youth academy when he was still a schoolboy. He was promoted to Qingdao Hailifeng's first squad in 2007. On 27 October 2007, he made his senior debut in the last match of 2007 China League One season which Qingdao Hailifeng beat Yanbian FC 1–0. He mainly played as a back-up goalkeeper for Sun Mingqin in Qingdao Hailifeng and became the first choice goalkeeper after Sun injured in the middle of 2009. On 2 September 2009, he was involved in "Chip Shot Gate" (吊射门) incident, in which Qingdao Hailifeng players tried to score a chip own-goal in the last few minutes of the match when they leading Sichuan FC 3–0. The president of Qingdao Hailifeng bet on Qingdao's victory as long as there were no fewer than four goals in the match on an overseas gambling website, however, Mu stopped his teammates' own goal attempt three times as the match finished at 3–0. In February 2010, Qingdao Hailifeng was banned from all future national matches organised by the Chinese Football Association for match-fixing scandal. Mu and his teammates turned to be unattached players. He signed a contract with Chinese Super League side Shaanxi Renhe in March 2010.

In 2010 season, Mu played as the third choice goalkeeper after Shen Jun and Wu Yansheng and didn't play for Shaanxi. He returned to Qingdao and signed a contract with another Super League club Qingdao Jonoon in early 2011. On 4 May 2011, he made his debut for Qingdao Jonoon in the first round of 2011 Chinese FA Cup which Qingdao lost to China League One club Guangdong Sunray Cave 6–5 in the penalty shootout. On 23 June 2012, he made his Super League debut in a 3–2 away victory against Guangzhou R&F, coming on as a substitute for injury Liu Zhenli in the 6th minute. Mu made an impressive act in the match and became the first choice goalkeeper after this match. He played 16 matches in the 2012 league season. Mu became the second choice goalkeeper in 2014 after Qingdao Jonoon relegated to the second-tier. He was demoted to the reserve squad in 2016 when he refused to extend his contract with the club.

In March 2017, Mu transferred to China League Two side Heilongjiang Lava Spring. He was the first choice goalkeeper of the club in the 2017 season as Heilongjiang who the title of the league and promoted to the second-tier. Mu appeared in every minute of the 2018 league season, playing in all 30 games which secured Heilongjiang's stay in the top flight for the next season. He won the Goalkeeper of the Season (League One) in November 2018.

On 27 February 2019, Mu returned to Renhe which had changed their name as Beijing Renhe in the Chinese Super League.

== Career statistics ==
Statistics accurate as of match played 31 December 2024.

Appearances and goals by club, season and competition
Club	Season	League			National Cup		Continental		Other		Total	
Club	Season	Division	Apps	Goals	Apps	Goals	Apps	Goals	Apps	Goals	Apps	Goals
Qingdao Hailifeng	2007	China League One	1	0	-		-		-		1	0
Qingdao Hailifeng	2008	China League One	4	0	-		-		-		4	0
Qingdao Hailifeng	2009	China League One	9	0	-		-		-		9	0
Qingdao Hailifeng	Total		14	0	0	0	0	0	0	0	14	0
Shaanxi Renhe	2010	Chinese Super League	0	0	-		-		-		0	0
Qingdao Jonoon	2011	Chinese Super League	0	0	1	0	-		-		1	0
Qingdao Jonoon	2012	Chinese Super League	16	0	1	0	-		-		17	0
Qingdao Jonoon	2013	Chinese Super League	19	0	2	0	-		-		21	0
Qingdao Jonoon	2014	China League One	3	0	0	0	-		-		3	0
Qingdao Jonoon	2015	China League One	7	0	0	0	-		-		7	0
Qingdao Jonoon	Total		45	0	4	0	0	0	0	0	49	0
Heilongjiang Lava Spring	2017	China League Two	27	0	2	0	-		-		29	0
Heilongjiang Lava Spring	2018	China League One	30	0	0	0	-		-		30	0
Heilongjiang Lava Spring	Total		57	0	2	0	0	0	0	0	59	0
Beijing Renhe	2019	Chinese Super League	11	0	2	0	-		-		13	0
Shenyang Urban	2020	China League One	1	0	-		-		-		1	0
Qingdao Hainiu	2021	China League Two	26	0	2	0	-		-		29	0
Qingdao Hainiu	2022	China League One	31	0	0	0	-		-		31	0
Qingdao Hainiu	2023	Chinese Super League	29	0	2	0	-		-		31	0
Qingdao Hainiu	2024	Chinese Super League	29	0	0	0	-		-		29	0
Qingdao Hainiu	Total		115	0	2	0	0	0	0	0	117	0
Career total			243	0	10	0	0	0	0	0	253	0
