= Li Linfeng =

Chinese footballer

Li Linfeng 李林峰
Personal information
- Full name: Li Linfeng
- Date of birth: 9 January 1988 (age 38)
- Place of birth: Haiyang, Shandong, China
- Height: 1.86 m (6 ft 1 in)
- Position: Defender

Youth career
- Qingdao Hailifeng

Senior career*
Years	Team	Apps	(Gls)
2004–2009	Qingdao Hailifeng	37	(0)
2010–2015	Qingdao Jonoon	0	(0)
2018–	Qingdao Kangtine	8	(0)

International career
2004–2005	China U-17		
- * Club domestic league appearances and goals as of 31 December 2020

Li Linfeng (Chinese: 李林峰; pinyin: Lǐ Línfēng; born 9 January 1988 in Haiyang) is a Chinese footballer.

== Club career ==
Li was promoted to China League One club Qingdao Hailifeng first team squad in 2004 when he was just 16 years old. Although he was deemed as being a hot prospect for the future along with Yu Dabao, he was unable to establish himself within the club until 2008. In February 2010, Qingdao Hailifeng was banned from all future national matches organised by the Chinese Football Association for a match-fixing scandal. Li and his teammates turned out to be unattached players and he signed a contract with Chinese Super League side Qingdao Jonoon in March 2010. On 4 May 2011, he made his debut for Qingdao Jonoon in the first round of 2011 Chinese FA Cup which Qingdao lost to League One club Guangdong Sunray Cave 6–5 in the penalty shootout. He left Qingdao Jonoon at the end of 2015 season.

== International career ==
Li was part of the China national under-17 football team to win the 2004 AFC U-17 Championship. He also played for China U-17s in the 2005 FIFA U-17 World Championship.

== Career statistics ==
Statistics accurate as of match played 31 December 2020.

Appearances and goals by club, season and competition
Club	Season	League			National Cup		Continental		Other		Total	
Club	Season	Division	Apps	Goals	Apps	Goals	Apps	Goals	Apps	Goals	Apps	Goals
Qingdao Hailifeng	2004	China League One	0	0	0	0	-		-		0	0
Qingdao Hailifeng	2005	China League One	1	0	0	0	-		-		1	0
Qingdao Hailifeng	2006	China League One	8	0	0	0	-		-		8	0
Qingdao Hailifeng	2007	China League One	0	0	-		-		-		0	0
Qingdao Hailifeng	2008	China League One	13	0	-		-		-		13	0
Qingdao Hailifeng	2009	China League One	15	0	-		-		-		15	0
Qingdao Hailifeng	Total		37	0	0	0	0	0	0	0	37	0
Qingdao Jonoon	2010	Chinese Super League	0	0	-		-		-		0	0
Qingdao Jonoon	2011	Chinese Super League	0	0	1	0	-		-		1	0
Qingdao Jonoon	2012	Chinese Super League	0	0	2	0	-		-		2	0
Qingdao Jonoon	2013	Chinese Super League	0	0	1	0	-		-		1	0
Qingdao Jonoon	2014	China League One	0	0	0	0	-		-		0	0
Qingdao Jonoon	2015	China League One	0	0	0	0	-		-		0	0
Qingdao Jonoon	Total		0	0	4	0	0	0	0	0	4	0
Qingdao Kangtine	2018	CMCL	-		-		-		-		-	
Qingdao Kangtine	2019	CMCL	-		1	0	-		-		1	0
Qingdao Kangtine	2020	China League Two	8	0	-		-		-		8	0
Qingdao Kangtine	Total		8	0	1	0	0	0	0	0	9	0
Career total			45	0	5	0	0	0	0	0	50	0

== Honours ==
=== International ===
China under-17 national football team

- AFC U-17 Championship: 2004
