= Tian Yong =

Chinese association football player

Personal information
- Date of birth: 12 January 1987 (age 39)
- Place of birth: Qingdao, Shandong, China
- Height: 1.80 m (5 ft 11 in)
- Positions: Midfielder; centre-back

Youth career
- ?-2005: Qingdao Hailifeng Academy

Senior career*
Years	Team	Apps	(Gls)
2005-2009	Qingdao Hailifeng		
2011-2012	Qingdao Kunpeng		
2013	Dali Ruilong		
2015–2016	Qingdao Kunpeng		
2017–2024	Qingdao West Coast		
- * Club domestic league appearances and goals as of 9 May 2024

Tian Yong (Chinese: 田勇; born 12 January 1987) is a Chinese former professional footballer who played as a midfielder or centre-back.

On 27 October 2024, Tian retired from professional football after the home game against Chengdu Rongcheng.

== Career statistics ==
=== Club ===
As of 9 May 2024.

Club	Season	League			Cup		Continental		Other		Total	
Club	Season	Division	Apps	Goals	Apps	Goals	Apps	Goals	Apps	Goals	Apps	Goals
Qingdao Hailifeng	2005	China League One	？	？	？	？	–		？	？	？	？
Qingdao Hailifeng	2006	China League One	？	？	？	？	–		？	？	？	？
Qingdao Hailifeng	2007	China League One	？	？	？	？	–		？	？	？	？
Qingdao Hailifeng	2008	China League One	？	？	？	？	–		？	？	？	？
Qingdao Hailifeng	2009	China League One	？	？	？	？	–		？	？	？	？
Qingdao Kunpeng	2011	QDFA League One	？	？	？	？	–		？	？	？	？
Qingdao Kunpeng	2012	QDFA Super League	？	？	？	？	–		？	？	？	？
Dali Ruilong	2013	China League Two	？	？	4 (Note: Appearances in the Chinese FA Cup)	1	–		0	0	4	1
Qingdao Kunpeng	2015	QDFA Super League	？	？	1	0	–		0	0	1	0
Qingdao Kunpeng	2016	QDFA Super League	？	？	5	3	–		0	0	5	3
Qingdao West Coast	2017	QDFA League Group A/China Amateur League	5	8	？	？	–		？	？	5	8
Qingdao West Coast	2018	QDFA League/CMCL	？	？	？	？	–		？	？	？	？
Qingdao West Coast	2019	QDFA League/CMCL	？	？	1	0	–		0	0	1	0
Qingdao West Coast	2020	China League Two	3	0	0	0	–		0	0	3	0
Qingdao West Coast	2021	China League Two	26	4	2	0	–		0	0	28	2
Qingdao West Coast	2022	China League One	30	3	1	0	–		0	0	31	3
Qingdao West Coast	2023	China League One	26	1	1	1	–		0	0	27	2
Qingdao West Coast	2024	Chinese Super League	2	0	0	0	–		0	0	2	0
Career total			92	16	15	5	0	0	0	0	106	19
