= 2007 China League One =

China League One
- Season: 2007
- Champions: Guangzhou Pharmaceutical
- Promoted: Guangzhou Pharmaceutical; Chengdu Blades
- Relegated: Hohhot Black Horse
- Top goalscorer: Luis Ramírez (19 goals)

The 2007 China League One was the fourth season of the China League One, the second tier of the Chinese football league pyramid, since its establishment in 2004.

== Teams ==
A total of 13 teams contested in the league, including 10 sides from the 2006 season, one relegated from the 2006 Chinese Super League and two promoted from the 2006 China League Two.

=== Team changes ===
==== To League One ====
**Teams relegated from 2006 Chinese Super League**

- Chongqing Lifan

**Teams promoted from 2006 China League Two**

- Beijing BIT
- Harbin Yiteng

==== From League One ====
**Teams promoted to 2007 Chinese Super League**

- Henan Construction
- Zhejiang Greentown

**Teams relegated to 2007 China League Two**

- Hunan Shoking

=== Personnel ===
Team	Manager
Beijing BIT	(China) Jin Zhiyang
Beijing Hongdeng	
Chengdu Blades	
Chongqing Lifan	(China) Wei Xin
Guangzhou Pharmaceutical	(China) Shen Xiangfu
Harbin Yiteng	(China) Wang Jun
Hohhot Black Horse	
Jiangsu Sainty	(Serbia) Branko Vojinović
Nanchang Bayi Hengyuan	(China) Li Xiao
Nanjing Yoyo	
Qingdao Hailifeng	
Shanghai Stars	(China) Peng Weiguo
Yanbian	(China) Gao Hui

=== Foreign players ===
The number of foreign players is restricted to three, but all teams can only use two foreign players on the field in each game. Players from Hong Kong, Macau and Chinese Taipei are deemed to be native players in CL1.

- Players name in **bold** indicates the player is registered during the mid-season transfer window.
- Players in italics were out of the squad or left the club within the season, after the pre-season transfer window, or in the mid-season transfer window, and at least had one appearance.

Club	Player 1	Player 2	Player 3	Former players
Beijing BIT	(South Korea) Han Je-kwang			
Beijing Hongdeng	(Brazil) Samir	(Croatia) Rajko Vidović	(South Korea) Kim Je-hwan	(Croatia) Igor Tkalčević
Chengdu Blades	(Brazil) Auricélio Neres	(Croatia) **Ivan Bulat**	(Ivory Coast) **Sékou Tidiane Souaré**	(Ivory Coast) Dramane Kamaté (Ivory Coast) Lamine Kourouma (Portugal) Orlando
Chongqing Lifan	(Brazil) Maurinho	(Democratic Republic of the Congo) Zola Kiniambi	(Ghana) **Daniel Quaye**	
Guangzhou Pharmaceutical	(Brazil) Clebão	(Brazil) **Jefferson Batista**	(Honduras) Luis Ramírez	(Paraguay) Casiano Delvalle
Harbin Yiteng	(South Korea) Jin Soon-jin	(South Korea) **Park Jung-hwan**	(South Korea) Wang Jung-hyun	
Hohhot Black Horse	(Brazil) Emerson	(Ghana) Lawrence Adjei	(Nigeria) **Innocent Melkam**	
Jiangsu Sainty	(Brazil) André	(Brazil) **Márcio**	(Brazil) Turatto	(Brazil) Henrique
Nanchang Bayi Hengyuan	(Brazil) **Gabriel Lima**	(Brazil) Juninho	(Canada) Sean Fraser	
Nanjing Yoyo	(Brazil) Cílio Souza			(Brazil) Jefferson Batista (Serbia) Zoran Stojanović
Qingdao Hailifeng	(Brazil) Nei Bala	(Ghana) Patrick Villars		(Serbia) Goran Marinković
Shanghai Stars	(Peru) **Flavio Maestri**	(Uruguay) Robert Lima		
Yanbian	(North Korea) Kim Myong-chol	(North Korea) Kim Song-chol	(North Korea) Kim Yong-jun	(Brazil) Willian Paulista (North Korea) So Hyok-chol

== League table ==
Pos	Team	Pld	W	D	L	GF	GA	GD	Pts	Promotion, qualification or relegation
1	Guangzhou Pharmaceutical	24	19	4	1	65	15	+50	61	Promotion to Super League
2	Chengdu Blades	24	16	7	1	54	14	+40	55	Promotion to Super League
3	Jiangsu Sainty	24	14	6	4	41	21	+20	48	
4	Chongqing Lifan	24	13	5	6	34	22	+12	44	
5	Nanchang Bayi Hengyuan	24	10	6	8	26	26	0	36	
6	Yanbian	24	9	6	9	36	35	+1	33	
7	Qingdao Hailifeng	24	10	3	11	27	36	−9	33	
8	Shanghai Stars	24	7	5	12	26	37	−11	26	
9	Beijing Hongdeng	24	6	6	12	21	31	−10	24	
10	Nanjing Yoyo	24	6	6	12	26	39	−13	24	
11	Beijing BIT	24	5	7	12	27	40	−13	22	
12	Harbin Yiteng	24	4	7	13	18	36	−18	19	
13	Hohhot Black Horse	24	1	4	19	8	57	−49	7	Forfeited

Updated to match(es) played on 27 October 2007. Source: League table
Rules for classification: 1) Points; 2) Head-to-head points; 3) Head-to-head goal difference; 4) Head-to-head goals scored; 5) Goal difference; 6) Goals scored; 7) Draw
