= Yu Ziqian =

Chinese footballer

Personal information
- Full name: Yu Ziqian
- Date of birth: June 3, 1985 (age 41)
- Place of birth: Dalian, Liaoning, China
- Height: 1.92 m (6 ft 4 in)
- Position: Goalkeeper

Youth career
- 1998: Dalian Yiteng
- 1999–2001: Dalian Shide

Senior career*
Years	Team	Apps	(Gls)
2002	Shanxi Wosen Luhu	16	(0)
2003–2007	Dalian Shide	5	(0)
2008–2009	Qingdao Jonoon	3	(0)
2010–2013	Dalian Aerbin	59	(0)
2013	→ Qingdao Hainiu (loan)	18	(0)
2014	Qingdao Hainiu	16	(0)
2015–2019	Dalian Yifang	3	(0)
- * Club domestic league appearances and goals as of 31 December 2019

Yu Ziqian (Chinese: 于子千, born 3 June 1985) is a Chinese former football goalkeeper.

== Club career ==
Yu Ziqian played for the Dalian Yiteng youth team before it was sold-off and then merged with Dalian Shide's own youth team. At Dalian Shide, Yu was trained by former England international goalkeeper Jimmy Rimmer, however before he had a chance to establish himself within the team he was seriously injured in a training session where he received a ruptured spleen and one year out of football. Upon his return from injury Yu was allowed to join third-tier club Shanxi Wosen Luhu in the 2002 league campaign before he returned to Dalian Shide after they needed a third choice goalkeeper the following season. At the top-tier club he would have to wait to establish himself until on April 9, 2003, in a 2002–03 AFC Champions League semi-final match he was given his debut after the first choice goalkeeper An Qi was sent-off and Yu had to deputize as Dalian Shide lost to Al Ain FC 4–2.

After making very little progress at Dalian Shide he was sold to top-tier club Qingdao Jonoon for 1.5 million Yuan and was expected to fight for the goalkeeping position against Liu Zhenli. After spending two seasons at the club Yu, however was unable to make the position his and he was allowed to leave for third-tier club Dalian Aerbin. The move would be a huge success and he would go on to win not only the successive league titles but promotion to the top tier of Chinese football, the Chinese Super League. At the beginning of the 2012 season Yu was even named vice-captain, however after a series of bad performance culminating in a 5-2 league defeat to Liaoning Whowin on July 28, 2012, Yu was dropped from the team.

In February 2015, Yu returned to Dalian Aerbin.

On 9 July 2020, Yu announced his retirement.

== Career statistics ==
Statistics accurate as of match played 31 December 2019.

Appearances and goals by club, season and competition
Club	Season	League			National Cup		League Cup		Continental		Total	
Club	Season	Division	Apps	Goals	Apps	Goals	Apps	Goals	Apps	Goals	Apps	Goals
Shanxi Wosen Luhu	2002	Yi League	16	0	-		-		-		16	0
Dalian Shide	2003	Chinese Jia-A League	0	0	0	0	-		1	0	1	0
Dalian Shide	2004	Chinese Super League	0	0	0	0	0	0	1	0	1	0
Dalian Shide	2005	Chinese Super League	0	0	0	0	0	0	-		0	0
Dalian Shide	2006	Chinese Super League	5	0	1	0	-			0	6	0
Dalian Shide	2007	Chinese Super League	0	0	-		-		-		0	0
Dalian Shide	Total		5	0	1	0	0	0	2	0	8	0
Qingdao Jonoon	2008	Chinese Super League	3	0	-		-		-		3	0
Qingdao Jonoon	2009	Chinese Super League	0	0	-		-		-		0	0
Qingdao Jonoon	Total		3	0	0	0	0	0	0	0	3	0
Dalian Aerbin	2010	China League Two	18	0	-		-		-		18	0
Dalian Aerbin	2011	China League One	22	0	2	0	-		-		24	0
Dalian Aerbin	2012	Chinese Super League	19	0	1	0	-		-		20	0
Dalian Aerbin	Total		59	0	3	0	0	0	0	0	62	0
Qingdao Hainiu (Loan)	2013	China League Two	18	0	0	0	-		-		18	0
Qingdao Hainiu	2014	China League One	16	0	4	0	-		-		20	0
Dalian Yifang	2015	China League One	0	0	0	0	-		-		0	0
Dalian Yifang	2016	China League One	1	0	1	0	-		-		2	0
Dalian Yifang	2017	China League One	0	0	1	0	-		-		1	0
Dalian Yifang	2018	Chinese Super League	0	0	5	0	-		-		5	0
Dalian Yifang	2019	Chinese Super League	2	0	2	0	-		-		4	0
Dalian Yifang	Total		3	0	9	0	0	0	0	0	12	0
Career total			120	0	17	0	0	0	2	0	139	0

== Honours ==
Dalian Aerbin

- China League One: 2011, 2017
- China League Two: 2010

Qingdao Hainiu

- China League Two: 2013
