= 2003–2009 Chinese football match-fixing scandals =

Chinese football corruption

The 2003–2009 Chinese football match-fixing scandals were revealed by a large-scale 2009–2013 investigation of football betting, bribery and match-fixing (Chinese: 中国足坛反赌风暴; lit. 'Chinese football anti-betting storm' (Note: Sometimes also known as "Chinese: 中国足坛反腐风暴; lit. 'Chinese football anti-corruption storm'" or "Chinese: 中国足坛打黑风暴; lit. 'Chinese football anti-organized crime storm'")). The scandals were first made public in October 2009. Instead of being led by General Administration of Sport of China or Chinese Football Association like previous investigations, this investigation was led by the Ministry of Public Security. Xie Yalong, Nan Yong and Yang Yimin, who are all former vice presidents of Chinese Football Association, along with Zhang Jianqiang and some other CFA officials were arrested and removed from their posts. Shanghai Shenhua was stripped of their 2003 Chinese Jia-A League title. Lu Jun, the only Chinese referee in the history of FIFA World Cup, and China national football team players Shen Si, Jiang Jin, Qi Hong and Li Ming were arrested and sentenced to 5.5 years or 6 years in jail.

== Background ==
In the aftermath of the 2001 Chinese football match-fixing scandal, referee Gong Jianping was jailed and died in the prison. Other team managers, referees and officials were not subject to any criminal prosecution. Shandong Luneng Taishan, Shanghai Shenhua and Zhejiang Green Town were fined 800,000 RMB, Jiangsu Sainty and Dalian Shide were fined 500,000 RMB, Qingdao Etsong Hainiu was fined 300,000 RMB. Their club managers were "seriously warned".

In 2006, Liaoshen Evening News report match-fixing event to the Chinese Football Association. Xie Yalong, Nan Yong and Yang Yimin replied "the CFA will carefully study the evidence and quickly request judicial intervention. Please report to us again next time."

== Notable affected matches ==
=== Shanghai Shenhua vs Shanghai COSCO Sanlin in 2003 ===
9 November 2003
15:00 (UTC+8)
Round 25, 2003 Chinese Jia-A League

Shanghai Shenhua	4–1	Shanghai COSCO Sanlin

Hongkou Football Stadium, Shanghai

It was revealed in 2011 that the referee Lu Jun and CFA official Zhang Jianqiang received bribes totaling 700,000 yuan from Shanghai Shenhua before this Shanghai derby match between the top two teams. In 2013, Shanghai Shenhua was stripped of its 2003 title. Lu Jun, once nicknamed "Golden Whistle" (金哨), was sentenced to 5.5 years in prison for fixing the results of the Shanghai derby and six other league matches.

=== Shanghai COSCO Sanlin vs Tianjin TEDA in 2003 ===
30 November 2003
15:00 (UTC+8)
Round 30, 2003 Chinese Jia-A League

Shanghai COSCO Sanlin	1–2	Tianjin TEDA

Shanghai Stadium, Shanghai

The CFA stipulated that the result of "the 2002 Jia-A League rank * 0.5 + the 2003 Jia-A League rank" will be used to determine the teams participating the newly created Chinese Super League in 2004. In the final round of the 2003 Jia-A League, Chongqing Lifan would have to lose to Qingdao Etsong Hainiu and hope Shanghai COSCO Sanlin, a title hopeful, could beat (or tie with) Tianjin TEDA. In the match, Chongqing's supporters cheered for the guest team, Qingdao, and Chongqing Lifan successfully lost to Qingdao Etsong Hainiu 1–3. However, Shanghai COSCO Sanlin lost to Tianjin TEDA in a 1–2 blowout. Tianjin TEDA gained the last seat for the inaugural Chinese Super League and Chongqing Lifan was relegated (although Chongqing was eventually able to qualify for the 2004 CSL by merging with Yunnan Hongta). Shanghai International finished one point behind the champions Shanghai Shenhua (in 2013, Shenhua were stripped of the title for bribing Lu Jun in the 9 November derby match).

In 2012, it was found that in 2003, the then vice president of the Chinese Football Association, Nan Yong, did not want Chongqing Lifan to "lose and qualify" and make the CFA rules a laughing stock. With Nan Yong's help, Tianjin TEDA's club manager, Zhang Yifeng, was able to contact Shanghai International and China national football team player Shen Si, who then contacted club and national teammates Jiang Jin, Qi Hong and Li Ming. After Shanghai COSCO Sanlin lost to Tianjin TEDA, the four players received 8 million yuan in total. Shen Si was sentenced to six years in prison, the other three were sentenced to five years and six months in prison.

=== Guangzhou Pharmaceutical vs Shanxi Wosen Luhu in 2006 ===
19 August 2006
16:00 (UTC+8)
Round 17, 2006 China League One

Guangzhou Pharmaceutical	5–1	Shanxi Wosen Luhu

Yuexiushan Stadium, Guangzhou

Guangzhou Pharmaceutical's team leader Yang Xu bribed Wang Pu, the general manager of Shanxi Wosen Luhu.

=== Guangzhou Pharmaceutical vs Zhejiang Green Town in 2006 ===
9 September 2006
16:00 (UTC+8)
Round 19, 2006 China League One

Guangzhou Pharmaceutical	3–2	Zhejiang Green Town

Yuexiushan Stadium, Guangzhou

With the help of the former CFA League Department official Fan Guangming, and retired Shandong Luneng player Leng Bo and Xing Rui, Guangzhou Pharmaceutical bribed the players of Zhejiang Green Town, Shen Liuxi and Hu Minghua, with a total amount of 1.5 million yuan.

=== Qingdao Hailifeng vs Chengdu Blades in 2007 ===
22 September 2007
15:00 (UTC+8)
Round 21, 2007 China League One

Qingdao Hailifeng	0–2	Chengdu Blades

Tiantai Stadium, Qingdao

Chengdu Blades general manager Xu Hongtao and deputy general manager You Ke offered Qingdao Hailifeng with 300,000 yuan and free winter training for a month at Chengdu's base, in exchange with Chengdu's victory of the match.

=== "Chip Shot Gate" of Qingdao Hailifeng in 2009 ===
2 September 2009
15:00 (UTC+8)
Round 18, 2009 China League One

Sichuan F.C.	0–3	Qingdao Hailifeng

Sichuan University Stadium, Chengdu

In a 2009 match against the bottom-of-the-league Sichuan F.C., Qingdao Hailifeng were leading 3–0 with 20 minutes left. But having bet before the match that the total number of goals would be at least four, Qingdao Hailifeng's chairman, Du Yunqi, asked the team for another goal into either net. Due to Sichuan's defensive effort, Qingdao was unable to score another goal. In the last minutes, Qingdao players tried three chip shots into their own goal. However, due to the goalkeeper Mou Pengfei's two saves on his teammates' shots and with the third attempt going wide, the match ended 3–0. The match was known as "Chip Shot Gate (吊射门)" in China. In 2010, CFA revoked Qingdao Helifeng's league registration. In 2012, Du Yunqi was sentenced to seven years in prison.

== Punishment ==
=== Clubs ===
On February 21, 2010, the CFA Disciplinary Committee made preliminary punishment decisions for clubs identified by the Ministry of Public Security Gambling Task Force as being involved in match-fixing cases.

- 2009 Chinese Super League teams Guangzhou Pharmaceutical and Chengdu Blades were relegated to China League One
- 2009 China League One team Qingdao Hailifeng's league registration was revoked, the club was fined 200,000 RMB

On February 18, 2013, the CFA Disciplinary Committee again announced its decision to punish the clubs involved in the match-fixing cases:

- Shanghai Shenhua was stripped of the 2003 Chinese Jia-A League champion title and deducted 6 points in the 2013 Chinese Super League and fined 1 million RMB
- Tianjin TEDA was deducted 6 points in the 2013 Chinese Super League and fined 1 million yuan
- Yanbian Changbai Tiger was deducted 3 points in the 2013 China League One and fined 500,000 RMB
- Shandong Luneng Taishan was fined 1 million RMB
- Changchun Yatai, Jiangsu Sainty and Henan Jianye were fined 500,000 RMB

=== Individuals ===
In addition, various sanctions were imposed on the individuals involved:

Name	Organisation / Team / Company	Position	Banned from football-related activities for
Yang Yimin (杨一民)	Chinese Football Sport Management Center, Chinese Football Association	Vice Director, Full-time Vice President	Lifetime
Zhang Jianqiang (张建强)	Chinese Football Sport Management Center, Chinese Football Association	Director of the Referee Committee	Lifetime
Nan Yong (南勇)	Chinese Football Sport Management Center, Chinese Football Association	Director, CCP Secretary, Full-time Vice President	Lifetime
Xie Yalong (谢亚龙)	Chinese Football Sport Management Center, Chinese Football Association	Director, CCP Deputy Secretary, Full-time Vice President	Lifetime
Wei Shaohui (蔚少辉)	Chinese Football Sport Management Center, Chinese Football Association	China national football team Leader	Lifetime
Li Dongsheng (李冬生)	Chinese Football Sport Management Center, Chinese Football Association	Director of Technical Department	Lifetime
Fan Guangming (范广鸣)	Chinese Football Sport Management Center, Chinese Football Association	Business officer in charge	Lifetime
Lü Feng (吕锋)	Chinese Super League Co., Ltd.	General Manager	Lifetime
Yang Feng (杨峰)	Chinese Super League Co., Ltd.	Deputy Director of Business	5 years
Zhang Zujian (张祖建)	Chinese Super League Co., Ltd.	Staff	5 years
Huang Junjie (黄俊杰)	Shanghai Football Association	Referee	Lifetime
Lu Jun	Beijing Sport University	Referee	Lifetime
Zhou Weixin (周伟新)	None	Referee	Lifetime
Wan Daxue (万大雪)	Zhuozhou Amateur Sports School	Referee	Lifetime
Jian Gao (高健)	Chongqing Football Association	Secretary General	5 years
Shen Si	Shanghai COSCO Sanlin	Player	Lifetime
Qi Hong	Shanghai COSCO Sanlin	Player	Lifetime
Jiang Jin	Shanghai COSCO Sanlin	Player	Lifetime
Li Ming	Shanghai COSCO Sanlin	Player	Lifetime
Lou Shifang (楼世芳)	Shanghai Shenhua	General Manager	5 years
Sui Jianhua (眭建华)	Shanghai Shenhua	Vice General Manager	5 years
Zhang Yifeng (张义锋)	Tianjin TEDA	General Manager	5 years
Wang Pu (王珀)	Shanxi Wosen Luhu	General Manager	Lifetime
Ding Zhe (丁哲)	Shanxi Wosen Luhu	Assistant coach	5 years
Du Yunqi (杜允琪)	Qingdao Hailifeng	President	Lifetime
Zuo Wenqing (左文清)	Qingdao Hailifeng	Head coach	Lifetime
Wang Shouye (王守业)	Qingdao Hailifeng	General Manager	Lifetime
Du Bin (杜斌)	Qingdao Hailifeng	Player	Lifetime
Liang Ming (梁明)	Qingdao Hailifeng	Player	Lifetime
Liu Hongwei (刘红伟)	Qingdao Hailifeng	Team Leader	5 years
Shen Liuxi (沈刘曦)	Zhejiang Green Town	Player	Lifetime
Hu Minghua (胡明华)	Zhejiang Green Town	Player	Lifetime
Gao Hui (高珲)	Yanbian Changbai Tiger	Head coach	Lifetime
Kim Kwang-soo (金光洙)	Yanbian Changbai Tiger	Assistant coach	Lifetime
Leng Bo (冷波)	Qingdao Etsong Hainiu	Assistant coach	Lifetime
Wu Xiaodong (吴晓东)	Guangzhou Pharmaceutical	Vice General Manager	Lifetime
Yang Xu (杨旭)	Guangzhou Pharmaceutical	Team Leader	Lifetime
Xie Bin (谢彬)	Guangzhou Pharmaceutical	Vice Chairman	5 years
Chen Zhinong (陈志农)	Guangzhou Pharmaceutical	Vice Chairman	5 years
Xu Hongtao (许宏涛)	Chengdu Blades	General Manager	5 years
You Kewei (尤可为)	Chengdu Blades	Team Leader	5 years
Gao Feng (高峰)	Wuxi Zobon	Player	Lifetime
Li Dan (李丹)	Wuxi Zobon	Player	Lifetime
Chen Qi (陈琦)	Wuxi Zobon	Player	5 years
Tan Xu (谭旭)	Wuxi Zobon	Player	5 years
Chen Liang (陈亮)	Wuxi Zobon	Player	5 years
Sun Xiaobun (孙晓鹍)	Wuxi Zobon	Player	5 years
Yao Youming (姚幼明)	Wuxi Zobon	Player	5 years
Zhang Yang (张扬)	Wuxi Zobon	Player	5 years
Li Zhimin (李志民)	Shaanxi National Power	Chairman	Lifetime
Chen Hong (陈宏)	Chongqing Lifan	General Manager	5 years
Wang Xuezhi (王学智)	Guangzhou Matsunichi	General Manager, Former International Referee	5 years
Mu Jun (慕军)	Guangzhou Matsunichi	Player	5 years
Xu Hong	Sichuan First City	Head coach	5 years
Zhang Jian (章健)	Shenyang Sealion	General Manager	5 years
Xu Xiaomin (许晓敏)	Shenyang Sealion	Team Leader	5 years
Guo Feng (郭峰)	Beijing AOLINSP Economic and Trade Development Co.	Football Agent	5 years

== Convicted individuals and clubs ==
=== CFA officials ===
Name	Organization / Team / Company	Position	Date of arrest (by the procuratorate)	Charge	First trial verdict
Xie Yalong (谢亚龙)	Chinese Football Sport Management Center, Chinese Football Association	Director, CCP Deputy Secretary, Full-time Vice President	5 October 2010	Alleged bribe-taking, Dereliction of duty	10.5 years in prison, Confiscation of all personal property
Nan Yong (南勇)	Chinese Football Sport Management Center, Chinese Football Association	Director, CCP Secretary, Full-time Vice President	27 January 2010	Alleged bribe-taking, Dereliction of duty	10.5 years in prison, Confiscation of 200,000 yuan in property
Yang Yimin (杨一民)	Chinese Football Sport Management Center, Chinese Football Association	Vice Director, Full-time Vice President	27 January 2010	Bribe-taking	10.5 years in prison, Confiscation of 200,000 yuan in property
Zhang Jianqiang (张建强)	Chinese Football Sport Management Center, Chinese Football Association	Director of the Referee Committee	27 January 2010	Bribe-taking	12 years in prison, Confiscation of 250,000 yuan in property
Wei Shaohui (蔚少辉)	Chinese Football Sport Management Center, Chinese Football Association	China national football team Leader	5 October 2010	Alleged bribe-taking	10.5 years in prison, Confiscation of 200,000 yuan in property
Li Dongsheng (李冬生)	Chinese Football Sport Management Center, Chinese Football Association	Director of Technical Department	5 October 2010	Alleged bribe-taking	9 years in prison, Fines of 100,000 yuan
Fan Guangming (范广鸣)	Chinese Football Sport Management Center, Chinese Football Association	Business Officer in charge	6 November 2009	Bribe-giving to non-state employee	3.5 years in prison, Fines of 150,000 yuan
Lü Feng (吕锋)	Chinese Super League Co., Ltd.	General Manager		Bribe-giving, Non-state employee bribe-taking	6.5 years in prison, Confiscation of 150,000 yuan in property
Yang Xu (杨旭)	Guangzhou Pharmaceutical, Guangzhou Football Association Officials	Team Leader			3 years in prison, Confiscation of all illegal income
Lin Weiguo (林卫国)	Chinese Football Association	Head of Youth Department	November 2020	Alleged bribe-taking	

=== Referees ===
Name	Charge	First trial verdict	Note
Lu Jun	Non-state employee bribe-taking	5.5 years in prison, Confiscation of 100,000 yuan in property	Chinese Jia-A League Referee of the Decade, two-time Asian Football Confederation Referee of the Year, the only Chinese referee that has supervised FIFA World Cup match
Huang Junjie (黄俊杰)	Non-state employee bribe-taking	7 years in prison, Confiscation of 200,000 yuan in property	
Zhou Weixin (周伟新)	Non-state employee bribe-taking, Bribe-giving to non-state employee	3.5 years in prison	
Wan Daxue (万大雪)	Non-state employee bribe-taking	6 years in prison, Confiscation of 150,000 yuan in property	

=== Players and Coaches ===
Name	Organization / Team / Company	Position	Charge	First trial verdict	Note
Yan Yi (阎毅)	Wuhan Optics Valley	Goalkeeper			Former China national under-23 football team player
Ding Zhe (丁哲)	Shenyang Sealion	Assistant coach		Unknown	
Li Xuebai (李雪柏)	Shanxi Wosen Luhu	Player			
Lü Dong (吕东)	Liaoning F.C.	Player		3 years in prison, Fines of 1500,000 yuan	
Leng Bo (冷波)	Qingdao Jonoon	Assistant coach		3 years in prison, Confiscation of all illegal income	
Xing Rui (邢锐)	Shandong Luneng Taishan	Former Captain		3 years in prison, Confiscation of all illegal income	
Hu Minghua (胡明华)	Zhejiang Green Town	Former Player		3 years in prison, Confiscation of all illegal income	
Shen Liuxi (沈刘曦)	Zhejiang Green Town	Former Player		5 years in prison, Confiscation of all illegal income	
Zuo Wenqing (左文清)	Qingdao Hailifeng	Head coach		5 years in prison, Confiscation of all illegal income	
Gao Hui (高珲)	Yanbian Changbai Tiger	Former Head Coach		3 years in prison, Confiscation of all illegal income	
Kim Kwang-soo (金光洙)	Yanbian Changbai Tiger	Former Assistant Coach		2 years in prison, Confiscation of all illegal income	
Shen Si	Shanghai COSCO Sanlin	Player		6 years in prison, Confiscation of all illegal income	China national football team player
Jiang Jin	Shanghai COSCO Sanlin	Player		5.5 years in prison, Confiscation of all illegal income	China national football team player
Qi Hong	Shanghai COSCO Sanlin	Player		5.5 years in prison, Confiscation of all illegal income	China national football team player
Li Ming	Shanghai COSCO Sanlin	Player		5.5 years in prison, Confiscation of all illegal income	China national football team player

=== Clubs and Staff ===
Name	Organization / Team / Company	Position	Charge	First trial verdict	Note
Wang Pu (王珀)	Shaanxi National Power, Shanxi Wosen Luhu	General Manager	Non-state employee bribe-taking, Fraud	8 years in prison, Fines of 230,000 yuan	
Li Zhimin (李志民)	Shaanxi National Power	Chairman	Non-state employee bribe-taking	5 years in prison, Confiscation of 250,000 yuan in property	
Wang Xin (王鑫)	Liaoning F.C.	Team Leader and General Manager	Bribe-giving to non-state employee, Opening a casino	7 years in prison, Fines of 3300,000 yuan	
Du Yunqi (杜允琪)	Qingdao Hailifeng	President	Bribe-giving by non-state employee, Non-state employee bribe-taking, Illegal detention	7 years in prison, Confiscation of 100,000 yuan in property	
Wang Shouye (王守业)	Qingdao Hailifeng	General Manager		5 years in prison, Confiscation of all illegal income	
Liu Hongwei (刘红伟)	Qingdao Hailifeng	Team Leader	Non-state employee bribe-taking	1 year in prison, 1 year of probation, Released by the court	Former China national football team player
You Kewei (尤可为)	Chengdu Blades	Team Leader and Vice General Manager	Bribe-giving to non-state employee	1 year in prison, 1 year of probation, Fines of 600,000 yuan, Released by the court	
Xu Hongtao (许宏涛)	Chengdu Blades	General Manager	Bribe-giving to non-state employee	1 year in prison, 1 year of probation, Released by the court	
Chen Zhinong (陈志农)	Guangzhou Pharmaceutical	Vice General Manager		2 years in prison, 3 years of probation, Confiscation of all illegal income	
Wu Xiaodong (吴晓东)	Guangzhou Pharmaceutical	Vice General Manager		3 years in prison, Confiscation of all illegal income	
Xie Bin (谢彬)	Guangzhou Pharmaceutical	High Level Official		2 years in prison, 3 years of probation, Confiscation of all illegal income	
Zhong Guojian (钟国建)	Guangdong Xiongying	General Manager			
He Bing (何兵)	Shenyang Sealion	General Manager			
Yang Wei (杨巍)		Football Agent			
Zhang Yifeng (张义锋)	Tianjin TEDA	General Manager			
Yu Zhifei (郁知非)	Shanghai Shenhua	General Manager		4 years in prison, Fines of 300,000 yuan	
Lou Shifang (楼世芳)	Shanghai Shenhua	General Manager			
Chengdu Blades			Bribe-giving to non-state employee	Fines of 600,000 yuan	
Qingdao Hailifeng			Bribe-giving to non-state employee	Fines of 2000,000 yuan	
Shandong Luneng Taishan			Bribe-giving to non-state employee	Fines of 1000,000 yuan	
Shanghai Shenhua			Bribe-giving to non-state employee	Fines of 1000,000 yuan	
Tianjin TEDA			Bribe-giving to non-state employee	Fines of 1000,000 yuan	
Yanbian Changbai Tiger			Bribe-giving to non-state employee	Fines of 500,000 yuan	
Changchun Yatai			Bribe-giving to non-state employee	Fines of 500,000 yuan	
Jiangsu Sainty			Bribe-giving to non-state employee	Fines of 500,000 yuan	
Henan Jianye			Bribe-giving to non-state employee	Fines of 500,000 yuan	

== Related articles ==
- 2001 Chinese football match-fixing scandal
- 2003 Chinese Jia-A League
- 1999 Chinese football match-fixing scandal
