= 2003 Chinese Jia-A League =

Chinese Jia-A League
- Season: 2003
- Champions: ~~Shanghai Shenhua~~
- Relegated: Chongqing Lifan; August 1st; Shaanxi Guoli
- AFC Champions League: Shanghai Shenhua; Dalian Shide
- A3 Champions Cup: Shanghai Shenhua; Shanghai International
- Matches: 210
- Goals: 546 (2.6 per match)
- Top goalscorer: Li Yi; Kwame Ayew; Saúl Martínez (14 goals each)
- Average attendance: 17,710

The 2003 Chinese Jia-A League season was the tenth season of professional association football and the 42nd top-tier overall league season in China. The league started on March 15 and ended on November 30, while in preparation for the rebranded Chinese Super League three teams were relegated at the end of the season.

Shanghai Shenhua finished as champions. However, they were later retrospectively stripped of the title on 19 February 2013 for match-fixing. Runners-up Shanghai International were also surrounded in their own match-fixing controversy, which saw several of their players taking bribes. Despite the club itself not being implicated in these crimes the season's title was not awarded to any club.

== Overview ==
The 2003 Chinese Jia-A League season was the last season before it was rebranded as the Chinese Super League by the Chinese Football Association and had 15 teams, with one team provided a bye for each round. Three teams were relegated at the end of the season. However, relegation was based on an averaging system using the last seasons and this season's final position.

At the end of the season, Shanghai Shenhua narrowly won the championship against their local neighbours Shanghai International. Critics would dispute the legitimacy of the title win after it was discovered in 2011 that the Shenhua general manager Lou Shifang bribed the head of the Chinese Football Association referee arrangements Zhang Jianqiang and referee Lu Jun 350,000 yuan each to be bias towards Shenhua in a vital match against Shanghai International in a game that Shenhua won 4–1. While all three men were officially charged with match-fixing, the club was spared any disciplinary action and were allowed to keep the title with the reason provided by the Chinese football association for the leniency being that they would be punishing the individuals who put the game in disrepute and not the club, because Lou Shifang was Shenhua's offending participant and had left the club several years before the allegations were confirmed it would have been harsh to punish the club retrospectively. On 18 February 2013, The CFA decided to change its mind on Shenhua and retrospectively decided to punish the club by revoking its 2003 league title, fining the club 1 million yuan and giving a 6-point deduction at the beginning of the 2013 Chinese Super League season after it was discovered that they also fixed another game against Shaanxi Guoli en route to winning the 2003 league title. Shanghai International, however, were not retrospectively awarded the title after it was officially confirmed on June 13, 2012, that the Shanghai International players Shen Si, Qi Hong, Jiang Jin and Li Ming took a bribe from former Tianjin TEDA general manager Yang Yifeng to lose their November 30, 2003 game, which saw all offending participants fined and jailed for their crimes as well as the Chinese FA deciding that Tianjin should also face a 1 million Yuan and 6-point deduction at the beginning of the 2013 Chinese Super League season.

Also within the season, Chongqing Lifan were relegated at the end of the campaign. However, they were allowed to remain within the division for next season when they bought Yunnan Hongta's registration and merged the two clubs together. This season also saw the loss of August 1st football club who were relegated and decided to disband at the end of the season. The club who were the sport branch of the People's Liberation Army had been in existence for over fifty years and were one of the most successful clubs in Chinese history during the amateur era. However, because all the players had to be active military members and paid accordingly made it impossible for them to compete with the other clubs who were now also paying professional wages to their players, which also saw the club struggle within the professional era and lead to the clubs disbandment.

== Personnel ==
Team	Manager
August 1st	(China) Pei Encai
Beijing Hyundai Cars	(Serbia and Montenegro) Ljupko Petrović
Chongqing Lifan	(Croatia) Miloš Hrstić
Dalian Shide	(Serbia and Montenegro) Milorad Kosanović
Liaoning Zhongshun	(China) Ma Lin
Qingdao Beilaite	(South Korea) Lee Jang-soo
Shaanxi Guoli	(Brazil) Artur Neto
Shandong Luneng	(Russia) Valery Nepomnyashchy
Shanghai International	(China) Cheng Yaodong
Shanghai Shenhua	(China) Wu Jingui
Shenyang Ginde	(Serbia and Montenegro) Dragoslav Stepanović
Shenzhen Jianlibao	(China) Zhu Guanghu
Sichuan Guangdong	(China) Xu Hong
Tianjin Kangshifu	(Italy) Giuseppe Materazzi
Yunnan Hongta	(China) Qi Wusheng

== Foreign players ==
As a military-owned team, August 1st were not allowed to sign any foreign players.

Club	Player 1	Player 2	Player 3	Player 4	Former players
Beijing Hyundai Cars	(Brazil) Henrique	(Brazil) Reginaldo Cachorrão	(Hungary) Krisztián Kenesei	(Paraguay) Casiano Delvalle	
Chongqing Lifan	(Argentina) Sebastián Cobelli	(Democratic Republic of the Congo) Zola Kiniambi	(Morocco) Rachid Azzouzi	(Romania) Constantin Schumacher	(Brazil) Elizeu (Morocco) Abdeljalil El Hajji
Dalian Shide	(Brazil) Adilson	(Bulgaria) Zoran Janković	(Netherlands) Dave de Jong	(Serbia and Montenegro) Srđan Bajčetić	(Serbia and Montenegro) Perica Ognjenović
Liaoning Zhongshun	(Bulgaria) Georgi Petrov	(Bulgaria) Stefan Yurukov	(Cameroon) Clément Lebe	(Romania) Augustin Călin	(Bulgaria) Metodi Stoynev (Finland) Marko Tuomela
Qingdao Beilaite	(Brazil) André Gaspar	(Croatia) Dragan Vukoja	(Croatia) Vladimir Petrović	(Uruguay) Fernando Carreño	(Brazil) Lula
Shaanxi Guoli	(Bulgaria) Ivo Trenchev				
Shandong Luneng	(France) Nicolas Ouédec	(Russia) Sergei Kiriakov	(Slovenia) Marinko Galič	(Ukraine) Serhiy Nahornyak	(Argentina) Hernán Pagés (Serbia and Montenegro) Zoran Čampara
Shanghai International	(Brazil) Zé Alcino	(Bulgaria) Metodi Stoynev	(Croatia) Ivan Bulat	(Paraguay) Nelson Cuevas	(France) Régis Dorn (France) Samuel Boutal
Shanghai Shenhua	(Germany) Jörg Albertz	(Germany) Thomas Vasov	(Honduras) Saúl Martínez	(Serbia and Montenegro) Dejan Petković	
Shenyang Ginde	(Brazil) Ratinho	(Costa Rica) Mauricio Wright	(Ghana) Kwame Ayew	(Nigeria) Prince Ikpe Ekong	(Cameroon) Alphonse Tchami
Shenzhen Jianlibao	(Brazil) Auricélio Neres	(Brazil) Nelson Simões	(Brazil) Tiago	(Togo) Djima Oyawolé	(Brazil) Cafú (Serbia and Montenegro) Dejan Rađenović
Sichuan Guancheng	(Brazil) Marcelo Marmelo	(Serbia and Montenegro) Miodrag Pantelić	(Sweden) Daniel Nannskog		
Tianjin Kangshifu	(Brazil) Émerson	(Brazil) Jorjão	(Denmark) Stig Tøfting	(Romania) Bogdan Mara	(Serbia and Montenegro) Nenad Vanić (Serbia and Montenegro) Zsombor Kerekes
Yunnan Hongta	(Brazil) Nei Bala	(Romania) Victor Naicu	(Uruguay) Osvaldo Canobbio		(Romania) Viorel Domocoş

== League standings ==
Pos	Team	Pld	W	D	L	GF	GA	GD	Pts	Promotion or relegation
1	~~Shanghai Shenhua~~ (Note: Shanghai Shenhua were stripped of the title on 19 February 2013 for the match-fixing scandal in this season.)	28	17	4	7	56	33	+23	55	2004 AFC Champions League qualification
2	Shanghai International	28	16	6	6	39	26	+13	54	2004 A3 Champions Cup qualification
3	Dalian Shide (Note: Dalian Shide won entry to the 2004 AFC Champions League after winning the 2002 Chinese Jia-A League, but because the AFC Champions League rescheduled the tournament, they had their entry moved until 2004.)	28	15	8	5	44	22	+22	53	2004 AFC Champions League qualification
4	Shenzhen Jianlibao	28	12	11	5	42	21	+21	47	
5	Shenyang Ginde	28	11	10	7	35	31	+4	43	
6	Liaoning Zhongshun	28	11	8	9	39	34	+5	41	
7	Yunnan Hongta	28	11	7	10	30	27	+3	40	
8	Sichuan Guancheng	28	9	10	9	41	42	−1	37	
9	Beijing Hyundai Cars	28	9	9	10	34	26	+8	36	
10	Tianjin Kangshifu	28	8	12	8	32	33	−1	36	
11	Qingdao Beilaite	28	10	5	13	40	50	−10	35	
12	Shandong Luneng	28	8	9	11	42	46	−4	33	
13	Chongqing Lifan (Note: Chongqing Lifan remained in the league for the following season after merging with Yunnan Hongta.)	28	6	8	14	21	34	−13	26	Relegated to Jia League
14	August 1st	28	6	4	18	23	59	−36	22	Relegated to Jia League
15	Shaanxi Guoli	28	3	5	20	28	62	−34	14	Relegated to Jia League

Source: rsssf.com

== Relegation ==
Chinese Super League qualification was based on the average positioning of the teams from the 2002 and 2003 league standings.

(Based on Positions in 2002 (x 0.5) and 2003 (x 1))

Pos	Team	2002 Position	2003 Position	Total Position	Qualification
1	Dalian Shide	0.5	3.0	3.5	Entry to the 2004 Chinese Super League
2	Shenzhen Jianlibao	1.0	4.0	5.0	Entry to the 2004 Chinese Super League
3	Shanghai International	4.5	2.0	6.5	Entry to the 2004 Chinese Super League
4	Shanghai Shenhua	6.0	1.0	7.0	Entry to the 2004 Chinese Super League
5	Liaoning Zhongshun	2.5	6.0	8.5	Entry to the 2004 Chinese Super League
6	Beijing Hyundai Cars	1.5	9.0	10.5	Entry to the 2004 Chinese Super League
7	Shenyang Ginde	5.5	5.0	10.5	Entry to the 2004 Chinese Super League
8	Yunnan Hongta	3.5	7.0	10.5	Entry to the 2004 Chinese Super League
9	Shandong Luneng	2.0	12.0	14.0	Entry to the 2004 Chinese Super League
10	Qingdao Beilaite	4.0	11.0	15.0	Entry to the 2004 Chinese Super League
11	Sichuan Guancheng	7.0	8.0	15.0	Entry to the 2004 Chinese Super League
12	Tianjin Kangshifu	5.0	10.0	15.0	Entry to the 2004 Chinese Super League
13	Chongqing Lifan	3.0	13.0	16.0	Relegated to the Jia League
14	August 1st	6.5	14.0	20.5	Relegated to the Jia League
15	Shaanxi Guoli	7.5	15.0	22.5	Relegated to the Jia League

== Top scorers ==
Rank	Scorer	Club	Goals
1	(China) Li Yi	Shenzhen Jianlibao	14
1	(Ghana) Kwame Ayew	Shenyang Ginde	14
1	(Honduras) Saúl Martínez	Shanghai Shenhua	14
4	(Brazil) Tiago	Shenzhen Jianlibao	13
4	(China) Hao Haidong	Dalian Shide	13
4	(China) Zhang Yuning	Shanghai Shenhua	13
7	(Brazil) Zé Alcino	Shanghai International	10
7	(Bulgaria) Zoran Janković	Dalian Shide	10
9	(China) Gao Ming	Qingdao Beilaite	9
9	(China) Wang Xinxin	Liaoning Zhongshun	9

== Awards ==
Player of the year (Golden Ball Award)

- (Germany) Jörg Albertz (Shanghai Shenhua)

Top scorer (Golden Boot Award)

- (China) Li Yi (Shenzhen Jianlibao)
- (Ghana) Kwame Ayew (Changsha Ginde)
- (Honduras) Saul Martínez (Shanghai Shenhua)

Manager of the year

- (China) Wu Jingui (Shanghai Shenhua)

Youth player of the year

- (China) Liu Jindong (Shandong Luneng)

CFA Team of the Year

Goalkeeper: (China) Jiang Jin (Shanghai International)
Defenders: (China) Xu Yunlong (Beijing Guoan), (China) Du Wei (Dalian Shide), (China) Li Weifeng (Shenzhen Jianlibao), (Brazil) Adilson (Dalian Shide)
Midfield: (China) Zheng Zhi (Shenzhen Jianlibao), (China) Zhao Junzhe (Liaoning Zhongshun), (Germany) Jörg Albertz (Shanghai Shenhua), (China) Shen Si (Shanghai International)
Attack: (Honduras) Saul Martínez (Shanghai Shenhua), (China) Li Yi (Shenzhen Jianlibao)

== See also ==
- 2003–2009 Chinese football match-fixing scandals
- Chinese Jia-A League
- Chinese Super League
- Chinese Football Association Jia League
- Chinese Football Association Yi League
- Chinese FA Cup
- Chinese Football Association
- Football in China
- List of football records in China
- Chinese clubs in the AFC Champions League
