= Chengdu Tiancheng F.C. =

Chinese professional football club

Chengdu Tiancheng Chéngdū Tiānchéng 成都天诚
- Full name: Chengdu Tiancheng Football Club 成都天诚足球俱乐部
- Nickname: Chinese Sheffield United
- Founded: 1996; 30 years ago as Chengdu Wuniu F.C.
- Dissolved: 2015
- Ground: Shuangliu Sports Center, Shuangliu County
- Capacity: 26,000
Home colours	Away colours

Chengdu Tiancheng F.C.
- Simplified Chinese: 成都天诚足球俱乐部
- Traditional Chinese: 成都天誠足球俱樂部
Transcriptions
Standard Mandarin
- Hanyu Pinyin: Chéngdū Tiānchéng; Zúqiú Jùlèbù
- Wade–Giles: Ch'engtu Hsiehfielien; Tsuch'iu Chülepu
- IPA: [ʈʂʰə̌ŋtú ɕjêféɪljɛ̌n tsǔtɕʰjǒʊ tɕŷlɤ̂pû]

Chengdu Tiancheng F.C. (simplified Chinese: 成都天诚; traditional Chinese: 成都天誠; pinyin: Chéngdū Tiānchéng) was a Chinese professional football club based in Chengdu, China, who last played in the 26,000 seater Shuangliu Sports Center in the China League One division. The club was founded on 26 February 1996 and was formerly known as Chengdu Five Bulls, named after their first sponsor, the Five Bulls Cigarette Company and later as Chengdu Blades, named after the nickname of then-owners (until 2010) English team Sheffield United. However, the club was officially dissolved on 4 January 2015 and was subsequently de-registered by the Chinese Football Association on 31 January 2015 due to unpaid salaries to players and staff.

For some years the team was named Chengdu Blades after English professional football club Sheffield United, whose nickname is the Blades. On 11 December 2005, Sheffield United took over the organization and changed the club's badge as well as the team's home kit to represent this. The club went on to achieve promotion and their highest ever league position of seventh in the top tier of Chinese football until they were embroiled in a match-fixing scandal in 2009. Punished with relegation the owners eventually sold their majority on 9 December 2010 to Hung Fu Enterprise Co., Ltd and Scarborough Development (China) Co., Ltd. On 23 May 2013 the Tiancheng Investment Group announced the acquisition of the club.

== History ==
=== Formation and promotion ===
The club was formed on 26 February 1996 under the name Chengdu F.C. and entered into China's Yi League with Wang Fengzhu as their first manager. In their inaugural year the team topped both their second round group as well as their final round group and progressed to the semi-finals before losing to Shenzhen Kinspar 2–1 on aggregate. Their second season in 1997 season saw them rise into China's Jia B League, this time coming second in the 2nd round group but again topping the final round group. They went on to win both their legs of the quarter-finals 1–0 against Beijing Kuanli and after brushing aside Shaanxi National Power 2–0 they progressed through to the final but lost 1–0 however they were still promoted along with the winners Jiangsu Gige as well as both semi-final losers.

After gaining promotion to the second tier Chengdu started the 1998 campaign well losing only two of their first nine matches in the higher division however in round 10 they were well beaten 8–0 away to Liaoning F.C. Their best win came in their penultimate match of the season when they beat Jiangsu Gige 4–1 and the team ended the season mid-table in eighth out of 12. Chengdu's second year in Jia B once again started well with the team losing just 1 of their first 13th games before succumbing to Beijing Kuanli away 4–0. At the end of the season after 22 matches Chengdu finished 6th with 9 wins and 8 draws. The start of the millennium season saw the team proceed with a poorer start than in previous years including defeat away to Guangzhou Apollo 5–0 however the team did manage to finish in 8th place.

=== Match fixing ===
The team started well for the 2001 season going unbeaten in their first eight games and went on to finish in third position however the season was tarnished when match-fixing allegations came to light involving Chengdu and four other teams. The team's record win over Mianyang F.C. 11–2 and their 4–2 away victory against Jiangsu Sainty were put under the spotlight and as a consequence all coaches and players involved in both matches (along with another game featuring the other two teams) were banned for one year, and all five teams had three months to reform and re-apply for playing in the next season's CFA competitions. The only points were deducted from Mianyang and they were relegated as punishment. To make the season even more disappointing, Chengdu fell at the first round of the Mexin Doors FA Cup losing 2–1 away to Jia A League side Tianjin TEDA.

=== Reformation ===
In 2002 Chengdu were reformed as a result of the previous season's match fixing and received the sponsor name Chengdu Taihe. Early in the season the team final progressed passed the first round of the Fuji Films FA Cup beating Shenyang Ginde 3–2 in nearby Deyang with a last minute goal however they were soon on their way home again after losing 3–1 to Qingdao Etsong Hainiu once again in Deyang. The league competition followed in much the same vein with the team finishing in 9th of 12 however a mid-season venue change to City Stadium in Luzhou can't have helped however Santos did manage to achieve joint top divisional scorer with 10 goals for the club.

The team crashed out yet again in the earliest stage of the Landi FA Cup in 2003 losing 2 of their 3 group matches. The team started using City Stadium in Deyang as its home ground this season and its name reverted to Chengdu in round 6 of the league in July. They finished the year in a respectable 6th place out of 14 after the division had been enlarged and beat 4th placed Jiangsu Sainty 5–1 in October.

Chengdu's poor cup performance continued in 2004 losing 5–3 on penalties after extra time to Qingdao Etsong Hainiu in the first round of the Landi FA Cup. The poor performance also contributed to their final position of 13th out of 17 that year after another enlargement. This season was also played at two differing home venues, the Provincial Sports Centre in Chengdu as well as City Stadium in Deyang.

The 2005 season was finally played back at one home venue in Chengdu, the Chengdu Sports Centre. They again crashed out of the CFA Cup in the first round, this time to Chinese Super League side Shanghai International. Their poor performance in the league also continued, finishing 11th of 14 in the league.

=== Foreign Ownership and promotion ===
Chengdu underwent another name change in January 2006, when they were bought out in a deal by the then Chairman of English football team Sheffield United, Kevin McCabe, who renamed the club Chengdu Blades to reflect the English team's nickname the Blades as well as changing the kits and badge, while the reserve team were sent to Hong Kong and named "Sheffield United (Hong Kong)" to advertise its association with the owning company. Sheffield United's unique international football model would continue with the purchase of Hungarian club Ferencvárosi TC and significant stakes with Australian team Central Coast Mariners FC, which were overseen by Group Executive Director, Michael Farnan who was responsible for the commercial development of the Sheffield United International Group. While this was going on the team's performance improved and by the end of the year they had climbed to 4th position in the table, their 2nd best ever finish at that time.

At the start of the 2007 Chinese league campaign, Chengdu's opening game of the season against Harbin Yiteng finished in a 6–0 victory in front of a home crowd of 4000 spectators, which resulted in the opposing Head Coach, Wang Hongli creating a Chinese League record for the fastest resignation after just one game. The club's strong start to the season continued and they wouldn't concede their first goal until 26 May 2007 in their Round 9 league game against Hohhot Black Horse, which they still went on to win 2–1. Even during the league break, Chengdu went on to face Chinese Super League side Shanghai Shenhua in a friendly that Chengdu came back to win 2–1. Round 14 commenced with a 3–1 win against Harbin Yiteng and the Blades moved onto the top spot. However, following consecutive 1–1 draws with Nanchang Bayi Hengyuan and Chongqing Lifan, the Blades fell back into 2nd position. This was cemented by their first defeat of the season, losing 2–1 against leaders Guangzhou Pharmaceutical.

The Blades returned to winning ways with 4 straight wins against Beijing Hongdeng (2–0), Nanjing Yoyo (6–1), Qingdao Hailifeng (2–0) and Hohhot Black Horse (3–0) and after 20 games the Blades were still in the second automatic promotion place with just another 4 matches to play, 5 points behind Guangzhou Pharmaceutical.

The Blades snatched the victory 2–1 in the last minute against Yanbian F.C. in their next away game to put themselves within touching distance of promotion, requiring just one more win which followed a week later in round 23 with Chengdu securing their place in next season's beating Shanghai Stars 4–2 in front of their home crowd.

Chengdu drew their penultimate game of the season 1–1 against Beijing BIT and faced former promotion rivals, 3rd placed Jiangsu Sainty in the final fixture of the China League at home on 27 October which finished 0–0 to ensure a promotion party just two seasons after the buyout by Sheffield United.

=== First Season in Top Flight ===
Chengdu had the privilege of staging the opening ceremony of the 2008 season of the Chinese Super League before their first match at home to Liaoning F.C. which was broadcast live on Chinese TV. The newcomers fell behind after 60 minutes but managed to earn a point just a few minutes later after Liu Cheng equalized. After an away defeat to 2007 champions Changchun Yatai on 5 April, the Blades had two successive victories against Zhejiang Green Town and Dalian Shide to move into 3rd place. And on 27 April 2008, Chengdu Blades beat Shanghai Shenhua with a score 2–1 and moved into the second place. This was followed by a 3–1 away loss to Tianjin TEDA and a 1–1 draw against Qingdao Jonoon.

On 12 May, Chengdu was rocked by the 2008 Sichuan earthquake. Fortunately, none of the Chengdu Blades personnel were injured and in the following days both staff and players donated blood for the cause. The players also visited schools affected by the earthquake and the club donated more than £11,000 along with tents, umbrellas, water, food and clothes including more than 5000 football shirts to people affected in the region. At the following game against Changsha Ginde on 17 May China League's first ever minute's silence was held before the match, which ended in a 1–1 draw, all gate money from this rounds games around China would also be given to the disaster zones.

In the remaining rounds Chengdu only won one more game beating Shenzhen 3–0 at home, drew another 9 matches (4 of which were 0–0 draws) and lost the other 10 games. This was enough to finish 13th in table and avoid relegation.

=== Match fixing and demotion ===
On 23 February 2010, Chengdu was relegated to China League One in the fallout of a match fixing scandal despite having achieved a 7th-place finish in the Chinese Super League the previous season. It was discovered by the Chinese police that on 22 September 2007 during the team's promotion campaign that the club's President Xu Hongtao and his deputy You Kewei paid Qingdao Hailifeng F.C. up to 500,000 RMB to lose a league game 2–0. Despite this setback under Wang Baoshan as manager, Chengdu Blades won immediate promotion back to the Chinese Super League after finishing second in League One, one point behind winners Guangzhou. With the club's owners, Sheffield United, struggling within their own league, funding for Chengdu Blades was cut and they experienced financial problems during the season, which resulted in the club finishing 15th and in the relegation zone at the end of the season.

== Retired numbers ==
18 – (China) Yao Xia, striker (2005–10). The number was retired in October 2010 in honour of his contribution to Sichuan football.

== Results ==
All-time league rankings

- As of the end of 2014 season.

Year	Div	Pld	W	D	L	GF	GA	GD	Pts	Pos.	FA Cup	Super Cup	AFC	Att./G	Stadium
1996	3	18	2^{1}	–	1^{1}				6^{1}	3	DNQ	DNQ	DNQ		
1997	3	12	2^{1}	–	1^{1}	2^{1}	1^{1}	1^{1}	6^{1}	2	DNQ	DNQ	DNQ		
1998	2	22	6	9	7	21	27	−6	27	8	R1	DNQ	DNQ		
1999	2	22	9	8	5	33	29	4	35	6	R1	DNQ	DNQ		Chengdu Sports Centre
2000	2	22	7	6	9	25	33	−8	27	8	R1	DNQ	DNQ		Chengdu Sports Centre
2001	2	22	12	6	4	48	25	23	42	3	R1	DNQ	DNQ		Chengdu Sports Centre
2002	2	22	7	6	9	31	36	−5	27	9	R2	DNQ	DNQ		Chengdu Sports Centre
2003	2	26	12	6	8	35	28	7	42	6	R1	DNQ	DNQ		Chengdu Sports Centre
2004	2	32	6	13	13	46	57	−11	31	13	R1	DNQ	DNQ		Chengdu Sports Centre
2005	2	26	8	2	16	40	57	−17	26	11	R1	DNQ	DNQ		Chengdu Sports Centre
2006	2	24	11	5	8	27	18	9	38	4	R1	DNQ	DNQ		Chengdu Sports Centre
2007	2	24	16	7	1	54	14	40	55	2	NH	DNQ	DNQ		Chengdu Sports Centre
2008	1	30	7	11	12	30	37	−7	32	13	NH	DNQ	DNQ	12,378	Chengdu Sports Center
2009	1	30	11	6	13	32	39	−7	39	7^{2}	NH	DNQ	DNQ	11,873	Chengdu Sports Centre
2010	2	24	17	5	2	56	15	41	56	2	NH	DNQ	DNQ		Chengdu Sports Centre / Dujiangyan Phoenix Stadium
2011	1	30	5	12	13	27	47	−20	27	15	R1	DNQ	DNQ	6,443	Chengdu Sports Centre
2012	2	30	11	8	11	33	40	−7	41	9	R3	DNQ	DNQ	2,026	Shuangliu Sports Centre
2013	2	30	7	8	15	27	37	−10	29	14	R2	DNQ	DNQ	3,591	Shuangliu Sports Centre
2014	2	30	6	8	16	29	45	−16	26	15	R2	DNQ	DNQ	1,924	Shuangliu Sports Centre / Dujiangyan Phoenix Stadium

- ^1 In final group stage. ^2Relegated for match-fixing scandal.

Key

	China top division
	China second division
	China third division
W	Winners
RU	Runners-up
3	Third place
	Relegated

- Pld = Played
- W = Games won
- D = Games drawn
- L = Games lost
- F = Goals for
- A = Goals against
- Pts = Points
- Pos = Final position
- DNQ = Did not qualify
- DNE = Did not enter
- NH = Not held
- – = Does not exist
- R1 = Round 1
- R2 = Round 2
- R3 = Round 3
- R4 = Round 4
- F = Final
- SF = Semi-finals
- QF = Quarter-finals
- R16 = Round of 16
- Group = Group stage
- GS2 = Second Group stage
- QR1 = First Qualifying Round
- QR2 = Second Qualifying Round
- QR3 = Third Qualifying Round
