= Shanghai Pudong =

Shanghai Pudong can refer to:

- Pudong, a district of Shanghai, China
- Shanghai Pudong International Airport, serving Shanghai
- Shanghai Pudong F.C., an association football club later renamed as Beijing Chengfeng
- Shanghai Zobon F.C., a defunct association football club sometimes referred to as Shanghai Pudong Zobon
