= Innocent Melkam =

Nigerian former professional footballer (born 1981)

Personal information
- Full name: Innocent Ufoma Melkam
- Date of birth: 26 May 1981 (age 45)
- Place of birth: Lagos, Nigeria
- Height: 1.84 m (6 ft 0 in)
- Position: Midfielder

Senior career*
Years	Team	Apps	(Gls)
1999–2001	SG Wattenscheid 09		
2001–2004	Karlsruher SC II	76	(14)
2001–2004	Karlsruher SC	10	(1)
2005	SV Grün-Weiß Langenberg		
2005–2007	Hammer SpVg		
2007–2008	Hohhot Black Horse		
2008	Guizhou Moutai		
- * Club domestic league appearances and goals

Innocent Ufoma Melkam (born 26 May 1981) is a Nigerian former professional footballer who played as a midfielder.

== Career ==
In July 1999, Melkam joined SG Wattenscheid 09, a Regionaliga club in Germany where he played for two years. In 2001, he left for Karlsruher SC's reserve Oberliga team and earned ten caps with the 2. Bundesliga team. With the reserve team, he played 76 games and scored 14 goals. In January 2005, he joined SV Langenberg and remained until May 2005. He then moved over to Hammer SpVg (2005–2007), whom he helped gain promotion into the Oberliga in 2006.

After the 2006–07 season, Melkam moved to the China League One, but was unfortunate because the club Hohhot Black Horse of Tibet was banned by the Chinese FA for rules violation. He later made a brief switch to Shanghai East Asia F.C. (China League One) in February 2008.

Melkam returned to Germany in January 2009 and played a half season for SUS Niederbonsfeld.

== Personal life ==
Melkam was born in Lagos, Nigeria. He holds both Nigerian and German citizenship.

His elder brother Gabriel Melkam is a left sided midfielder who played for Changchun Yatai in China.
