= Shen Si =

Chinese footballer

Shen Si 申思
Personal information
- Full name: Shen Si
- Date of birth: May 1, 1973 (age 53)
- Place of birth: Shanghai, China
- Position: Midfielder

Youth career
- Shanghai Shenhua

Senior career*
Years	Team	Apps	(Gls)
1994–2001	Shanghai Shenhua	160	(25)
2002–2004	Shanghai International	58	(3)
2005–2006	Shanghai Zobon	7	(0)
Total		225	(28)

International career
1995–2002	China	39	(3)

Managerial career
- 2006–2007: Shanghai Zobon
- 2009–2010: Pudong Zobon
Medal record
Men's football
Representing China
East Asian Games
Bronze medal – third place	1993 Shanghai	Football
AFC U-16 Championship
Bronze medal – third place	1990 UAE	Team
- * Club domestic league appearances and goals

Shen Si (Chinese: 申思; born 1 May 1973 in Shanghai) is a former Chinese international footballer who played as a left midfielder where he gained a reputation for his technical and free kick skills, which saw him become a runner-up in the 2004 Free Kick Masters. After representing Shanghai Shenhua and Shanghai International as a player he took up managing Pudong Zobon F.C. before being relieved of his position after it was revealed that he was involved in fixing a game in the 2003 Chinese Jia-A League season while he was a player. On October 15, 2010, he was detained by the police for his involvement in fixing a league game against Tianjin Teda on November 30, 2003 and was sentenced to six years imprisonment on June 13, 2012.

== Playing career ==
Shen Si would go to several specialist sports schools during his youth before being picked up by Shanghai Shenhua and the Chinese U-23 team. At Shenhua he would start his career at the dawn of China's first fully professional league season in the 1994 league season where he quickly establish himself as a vital player within the squad before going on to win the league title in the 1995 league season. At Shenhua, Shen would add the 1998 Chinese FA Cup medal to his collection and become a regular for the Chinese national team, which saw him included in the 2000 AFC Asian Cup in a tournament that saw China finish fourth. Despite becoming the club's captain at Shenhua by 2001 in 2002 Shen decided to make a big money move to local rivals Shanghai International who were willing to pay 9.4 million Yuan and wages equivalent to 20,000 US dollars per week to make Shen one of the best paid players in Chinese football. His move would eventually see Shanghai International become title contenders and they just missed out of the title at the end of the 2003 league season. The following season saw Shen spend most of the season injured, due to his age and his wages the club would off load him to second tier club Shanghai Zobon where Shen would eventually retire.

== International goals ==
No.	Date	Venue	Opponent	Score	Result	Competition
1.	26 January 2000	Thống Nhất Stadium, Ho Chi Minh City, Vietnam	Guam	17–0	19–0	2000 AFC Asian Cup qualification

== Management career ==
He became the care-taker manager of Pudong Zobon during the 2009 season and later was offered the position on a permanent basis. Under his stewardship, the team ranked 9th in the China League One at the end of season. In the 2010 season Shen Si led his team to a flying start but experienced a string of mediocre results afterward. Throughout the term Pudong Zobon was fighting against relegation. On October 15, 2010, he was reported to have been detained by the police and was said to be involved in fixing the game during his stint at Shanghai Zhongyuan. He was absent from the subsequent matches of Pudong Zobon. Shortly afterward the club announced that his place was taken by the assistant manager Huang Zhenhua. At the end of the 2010 season, Pudong Zobon won its battle against relegation and ranked 10th.

== Match-fixing ==
On October 15, 2010, Shen was reported to have been detained by the police and was said to be involved in fixing the November 30, 2003 league game against Tianjin Teda during his stint as a player at Shanghai International. The allegations suggests that Shen was bribed by former Tianjin Teda general manager Yang Yifeng a total of 12 million Yuan to lose the game and that Shen had asked teammates Qi Hong, Jiang Jin and Li Ming (1975) to help him. After being arrested by the police Qi Hong along with Shen were later released on bail while the police traced back 2 million Yuan from their accounts, after a lengthy wait Shen was found guilty of match-fixing as was sentenced to six years imprisonment on June 13, 2012 and fined 500,000 Yuan while his associates were given five and a half each.

== Honours ==
=== Player ===
Shanghai Shenhua

- Chinese Jia-A League: 1995
- Chinese FA Cup: 1998
