= Li Ming (footballer, born 1975) =

Chinese footballer and coach

Li Ming 李明
Personal information
- Date of birth: 4 May 1975 (age 51)
- Place of birth: Qingdao, China
- Height: 1.82 m (5 ft 11 1/2 in)
- Position: Defender

Senior career*
Years	Team	Apps	(Gls)
1994–2001	Shandong Luneng	126	(8)
2002	Beijing Guoan	22	(2)
2003	Shanghai International	21	(3)
2004–2005	Shenzhen Jianlibao	30	(1)
2006	Shanghai Stars	10	(1)

International career
1994	China U20		
1995–2003	China	9	(0)
Medal record
Men's football
Representing China
East Asian Games
Bronze medal – third place	1993 Shanghai	Football
AFC U-16 Championship
Bronze medal – third place	1990 UAE	Team
- * Club domestic league appearances and goals as of 7 February 2009

Li Ming (Chinese: 李明; pinyin: Li Míng; born May 4, 1975, in Qingdao) is an assistant coach and a former Chinese international footballer. As a player, he holds the distinction of being the first professional player to win the Chinese league championship at two different clubs, his first as a key member of the Shandong Luneng's 1999 championship voyage and then as a member of Shenzhen Jianlibao's championship squad in 2004. After retiring he would have a short stint as an assistant coach for Shanghai Stars and he moved away from football until October 17, 2010, saw him detained by the police for his involvement in fixing a league game during his time at Shanghai International in a match against Tianjin Teda on November 30, 2003, and was sentenced to five and a half years imprisonment on June 13, 2012.

== Club career ==
Li Ming started his football career with top tier side Shandong Luneng in the 1994 Chinese Jia-A League campaign, which was the inaugural season of fully professional football within China. With Shandong he had established himself as a key member of the team and by the 1999 league season he had won the league title and Chinese FA Cup with them. By the 2001 league season Li Ming had lost his starting position within the team where he was limited to only five games and after a disappointing campaign he was allowed to leave the club. At the beginning of the 2002 league season he would transfer to another top tier side in Beijing Guoan where he would immediately establish himself as a vital member of the team and helped the club to a third-place finish.

After only one season with Beijing Guoan, Li Ming decided to transfer to Shanghai International in 2003 and once again he immediately established himself as a vital member of the team that narrowly lost the 2003 league season and came runners-up by a single point. His time with Shanghai International, however did not last very long after rumours circulated that the team threw the league and Li Ming joined Shenzhen Jianlibao to take part in the rebranded 2004 Chinese Super League. At his new club he formed a solid defense with Li Weifeng and Xin Feng, which saw the team win the championship. After his successful time with Shenzhen and nearing the end of his career, Li Ming transferred to second tier club Shanghai Stars in 2006 with the invitation from his old pal at Shanghai International, Shen Si where he played as a player and assistant coach for one year.

== International career ==
Li Ming was called up to the Chinese U-23 team and was part of the team that was knocked-out in the qualifiers for the Football at the 1996 Summer Olympics. Despite this he was called up to the senior team by Qi Wusheng who tried him out within the 1995 Dynasty Cup where Li Ming made his debut on February 19, 1995, against South Korea in a 0–0 draw. His time for the national team was sporadic until Bora Milutinovic became manager and after Li Ming's successful title win he was called back into the team in 2000 for several further friendlies, however he could not do enough to remain a permanent member.

== Match-fixing ==
On October 17, 2010, Li Ming was reported to have been detained by the police and was said to be involved in fixing the November 30, 2003, league game against Tianjin Teda during his stint as a player at Shanghai International. The allegations suggests that his teammate Shen Si was bribed by former Tianjin Teda general manager Yang Yifeng a total of 12 million Yuan to lose the game and that Shen had asked teammates Li Ming, Jiang Jin and Qi Hong and to help him. After being arrested by the police a lengthy wait eventually saw Li Ming found guilty of match-fixing and was sentenced to five and a half years imprisonment on June 13, 2012, and fined 500,000 Yuan along with his associates except for Shen Si who was given six years.

== Honours ==
Shandong Luneng

- Chinese Jia-A League: 1999 (Top tier)
- Chinese FA Cup: 1995, 1999

Shenzhen Jianlibao

- Chinese Super League: 2004 (Top tier)
