= Hohhot People's Stadium =

Sports venue in Hohhot, China

Coordinates: 40°48′31″N 111°39′50″E

Hohhot People's Stadium (Chinese: 呼和浩特市人民体育场) was a multi-use stadium in Hohhot, Inner Mongolia, China. Opened in 1952, it is the stadium with the longest history in Hohhot. Renovation work on the current stadium began in 1986 and was completed in 1987. Situated next to Qingcheng Park, it was used mostly for football matches. This stadium held 30,000 people. Prior to the construction of the new Hohhot City Stadium on the north side of the city, it was the home of the Hohhot City Games, several Inner Mongolia Games, and the site of a wide range of sports and political rally activities. It was also home to the short-lived Hohhot Black Horse, a member of the Chinese Jia League.
