= Goran Marinković =

Serbian footballer

Personal information
- Full name: Goran Marinković
- Date of birth: 8 January 1979 (age 47)
- Place of birth: Subotica, SFR Yugoslavia
- Height: 1.78 m (5 ft 10 in)
- Position: Midfielder

Senior career*
Years	Team	Apps	(Gls)
- Solunac Karađorđevo
1996–2000	Spartak Subotica	140	(16)
2000–2005	Hajduk Kula	118	(4)
2005	Radnički Bajmok		
2006	Mladost Apatin	26	(3)
2007	Qingdao Hailifeng	21	(0)
2007	Ljungskile SK	12	(?)
2008	Zlatibor Voda	11	(1)
2008–2009	Spartak Subotica	30	(3)
2009	Sloga Kraljevo	13	(0)
2010	Petrovac	13	(0)
- * Club domestic league appearances and goals

Goran Marinković (Serbian Cyrillic: Горан Маринковић, born January 8, 1979) is a Serbian retired football midfielder.

== Career ==
After playing with Serbian clubs FK Solunac Karađorđevo, FK Spartak Subotica, FK Hajduk Kula, FK Radnički Bajmok and FK Mladost Apatin, he had a 6 months spelt in China with Qingdao Hailifeng F.C., and another half season in Sweden with Ljungskile SK, before returning to Serbia to play with FK Zlatibor Voda, Spartak Subotica again and FK Sloga Kraljevo. Since January 2010 he has been playing with Montenegrin club OFK Petrovac.
