= Auricélio Neres =

Brazilian footballer (born 1976)

Personal information
- Full name: Auricélio Neres Rodrigues
- Date of birth: August 28, 1976 (age 50)
- Place of birth: Teresina, Brazil
- Height: 1.87 m (6 ft 2 in)
- Position: Striker

Senior career*
Years	Team	Apps	(Gls)
1998	Comercial	?	(?)
1999	Sertãozinho	?	(?)
1999	Náutico	?	(?)
2000	Americano	?	(?)
2000	Paulista	?	(?)
2001	Jiangsu Sainty	17	(12)
2002	Shanghai Shenhua	1	(0)
2002	→ Jiangsu Sainty (loan)	?	(?)
2003–2004	Shenzhen Kejian	33	(23)
2005	Jiangsu Sainty	12	(9)
2006	Shanxi Wosen Luhu	19	(8)
2007–2009	Chengdu Blades	63	(25)
2010	Hubei Luyin	22	(5)
- * Club domestic league appearances and goals

Auricélio Neres Rodrigues (born August 28, 1976), or simply Rodrigues, is a Brazilian striker.

Rodrigues scored the only goal in the Blades' Round 3 game against Zhejiang Green Town, the club's first ever victory in the Chinese Super League.

He joined Hubei Luyin on 20 February 2010.
