= Nanjing Yoyo F.C. =

Defunct Chinese association football club

Nanjing Yoyo Nánjīng Yǒuyǒu 南京有有
- Full name: Nanjing Yoyo Football Club 南京有有足球俱乐部
- Founded: 2002; 23 years ago
- Dissolved: 2011; 14 years ago
- Ground: Wutaishan Stadium
- Capacity: 18,000
Home colours	Away colours

Nanjing Yoyo Football Club (Chinese: 南京有有; pinyin: Nánjīng Yǒuyǒu) was a Chinese football club based in Nanjing which played in the China League One (formerly known as Jia B League) from 2003 to 2010.

Founded in 2002 as Liaoning Xingguang Football Club, it was based on the youth team of Liaoning FC. In 2003, they were bought by SVT Group and renamed Nanjing Yoyo. The club finished bottom of the Jia League in 2010 and were due to play in League Two during the following campaign. However, due to wage issues, the Chinese Football Association denied the club entry into League Two, with the club dissolving soon afterwards.

== Results ==
All-time League Rankings

Season	2002	2003	2004	2005	2006	2007	2008	2009	2010
Division	2	2	2	2	2	2	2	2	2
Position	6	9	9	7	5	10	10	12	13
