= Qi Hong =

Chinese footballer

Qi Hong 祁宏
Personal information
- Full name: Qi Hong
- Date of birth: 3 June 1976 (age 50)
- Place of birth: Shanghai, China
- Height: 1.76 m (5 ft 9 1/2 in)
- Position: Attacking midfielder

Senior career*
Years	Team	Apps	(Gls)
1995–2001	Shanghai Shenhua	145	(24)
2002–2004	Shanghai COSCO Huili	40	(4)
2005	Shanghai The 9	11	(4)
2006	Shanghai United	6	(0)
Total		202	(32)

International career
1998–2003	China	39	(11)
- * Club domestic league appearances and goals

Qi Hong (Chinese: 祁宏; pinyin: Qí Hóng; born June 3, 1976, in Shanghai) is a former Chinese international footballer who played as an attacking midfielder or shadow striker throughout his career.

At Shanghai Shenhua he won the league and Chinese FA Cup before controversially moving to then local neighbours Shanghai COSCO Huili. Internationally, he was part of the Chinese squad that came fourth within the 2000 AFC Asian Cup. He was also part of the squad that took part in the 2002 FIFA World Cup. After retiring, he helped form a local youth football club Shanghai Luckystar. However on October 12, 2010, he was detained by police for his involvement in fixing a league game against Tianjin Teda F.C. On November 30, 2003, and was sentenced to five and a half years imprisonment on June 13, 2012.

== Club career ==
As a juvenile, he progressed at all the levels of the Shanghai Shenhua youth football training system and was a stand out player before he graduated into the senior side. Making his debut in the senior team at the 1995 league season, at the age of 19 he made a significant impression by scoring 6 league goals in 14 appearances that helped contribute to Shanghai Shenhua winning the league championship. He would cement his position within the team the following season when he played in 16 league games scoring 4 goals. However, this was not enough from regaining the title and Shanghai unfortunately came second in the league to Dalian Wanda. During his 7 seasons at Shanghai he was only able to add a Chinese FA Cup to his honours and despite coming runners up several times they were often beaten by the dominant Dalian Wanda.

Qi Hong would surprise many when he transferred to SFC's local rivals Shanghai COSCO Huili at the beginning of the 2002 league season. While the transfer initially saw Shanghai COSCO Huili better Shanghai Shenhua by coming in 9th compared to Shanghai Shenhua's 12th and several seasons of that saw both teams fight for the title, Shanghai COSCO Huili decided to move to Xi'an and Qi left. Deciding to stay in Shanghai Qi played for Shanghai The 9 who were in the second tier as well as ending his career with Shanghai United.

After his retirement in 2007, he devoted himself into cultivating Chinese youth football player. Therefore, he and his good friend Shen Si, who was also a national football player, launched a local football club called Shanghai Luckystar, with the goal to develop the super football player for China.

== International career ==
Qi Hong was called into the Chinese senior squad in 1998. There, he established himself as a regular and was known for his outstanding football awareness and technical ability rather than his physical strength. During his time with the national team he and fellow Shanghai team members, Fan Zhiyi and Xie Hui were called "The Three Musketeers." Qi Hong particularly endeared himself to the national team when he scored three key goals in the Asian zone second stage in qualifying for the 2002 World Cup finals against United Arab Emirates and Oman to send China to their first World Cup. Highly respected, Qi Hong was often the key to the Chinese attack on the pitch even though he lacked the physical presence of others, yet he was the leader on the football pitch and was a very popular and respected footballer despite having a low-key and modest character.

=== Match-fixing, 2010 ===
On October 12, 2010, Qi Hong was reported to have been detained by the police and was said to be involved in fixing the November 30, 2003, league game against Tianjin Teda F.C. during his stint as a player at Shanghai International. The allegations suggest that his teammate Shen Si was bribed by former Tianjin Teda general manager Yang Yifeng a total of 12 million Yuan to lose the game and that Shen had asked teammates Qi Hong, Jiang Jin and Li Ming (1975) to help him. After being arrested by the police a lengthy wait eventually saw Qi Hong found guilty of match-fixing and was sentenced to five and a half years imprisonment on June 13, 2012, and fined 500,000 Yuan along with his associates except for Shen Si who was given six years.

=== International goals ===
No.	Date	Venue	Opponent	Score	Result	Competition
1.	26 January 2000	Thống Nhất Stadium, Ho Chi Minh City, Vietnam	Guam	18–0	19–0	2000 AFC Asian Cup qualification
2.	25 April 2000	Hong Kong Stadium, So Kon Po, Hong Kong	Hong Kong	1–0	1–0	Friendly
3.	1 September 2000	Shanghai Stadium, Shanghai, China	Thailand	2–0	3–1	2000 Four Nations Tournament
4.	16 October 2000	International Olympic Stadium, Tripoli, Lebanon	Indonesia	4–0	4–0	2000 AFC Asian Cup
5.	23 October 2000	Saida Municipal Stadium, Sidon, Lebanon	Qatar	2–0	3–1	2000 AFC Asian Cup
6.	26 October 2000	Camille Chamoun Sports City Stadium, Beirut, Lebanon	Japan	1–1	2–3	2000 AFC Asian Cup
7.	13 May 2001	Kunming Tuodong Sports Center, Kunming, China	Indonesia	4–1	5–1	2002 FIFA World Cup qualification
8.	25 August 2001	Wulihe Stadium, Shenyang, China	United Arab Emirates	2–0	3–0	2002 FIFA World Cup qualification
9.	31 August 2001	Sultan Qaboos Sports Complex, Muscat, Oman	Oman	1–0	2–0	2002 FIFA World Cup qualification
10.	27 September 2001	Sheikh Zayed Stadium, Abu Dhabi, United Arab Emirates	United Arab Emirates	1–0	1–0	2002 FIFA World Cup qualification
11.	31 August 2003	Lockhart Stadium, Fort Lauderdale, United States	Haiti	1–1	3–4	Friendly

== Honours ==
Shanghai Shenhua

- Chinese Jia-A League: 1995
- Chinese FA Cup: 1998
