= Hernán Pagés =

Argentine footballer

Personal information
- Full name: Ricardo Hernán Pagés
- Date of birth: 2 May 1973 (age 53)
- Place of birth: Buenos Aires, Argentina
- Height: 1.82 m (6 ft 0 in)
- Position: Right-back

Senior career*
| Years | Team | Apps | (Gls) |
| 1991–2000 | Chacarita Juniors | 167 | (10) |
| 1995–1996 | → Gimnasia de Jujuy (loan) | 10 | (0) |
| 2000–2004 | Quilmes | 43 | (2) |
| 2001–2002 | → Lanús (loan) | 31 | (3) |
| 2002 | → LDU Quito (loan) | 23 | (1) |
| 2003 | → Shandong Luneng (loan) | | |
| 2003 | → Deportivo Español (loan) | 4 | (1) |
| 2004–2005 | Instituto | 31 | (1) |
| 2005–2007 | Banfield | 48 | (3) |
| 2007 | Belgrano | 13 | (0) |
| 2008 | Deportes Melipilla | 16 | (1) |
| 2009–2010 | Temperley | 32 | (1) |
| 2010–2011 | Comunicaciones | 29 | (0) |
| Total | | 447 | (23) |
- * Club domestic league appearances and goals

Ricardo Hernán Pagés (born 2 May 1973) is an Argentine former professional footballer who played as a right-back.
