= Beijing Chengfeng F.C. =

Association football club in China

Beijing Chengfeng Běijīng Chéngfēng 北京橙丰
- Full name: Beijing Chengfeng Football Club 北京橙丰足球俱乐部
- Founded: 3 February 1995; 31 years ago
- Dissolved: 29 March 2021; 5 years ago
- Ground: Beijing Fengtai Stadium, Beijing
- Capacity: 31,043
- Owner(s): Renhe Commercial Holdings Company Limited; Dai Yongge; Xiuli Hawken
- League: China League One
- 2020: League One, 17th
- Website: www.beijingrenhefc.com/index.html
| Home colours | Away colours |

Beijing Chengfeng Football Club (Chinese: 北京橙丰; pinyin: Běijīng Chéngfēng) was a professional Chinese football club that last participated in the Chinese League One under licence from the Chinese Football Association (CFA). The team was based in Fengtai District, Beijing and their home stadium was the Beijing Fengtai Stadium that has a seating capacity of 31,043. Their last majority shareholder was Chinese property developers of shopping centers Renhe Commercial Holdings Company Limited.

The club was founded in Pudong District, Shanghai on 3 February 1995 and were originally known as Shanghai Pudong before they made their debut in the third tier of China's football league pyramid in the 1995 season. They would work their way up to the top tier while changing name to accommodate their sponsors. In the 2006 season the club would relocate the team to Shaanxi and rename themselves Xi'an Chanba International, however by the 2012 season, the club relocated this time to Guizhou, and changed their name to Guizhou Renhe. In the 2016 season the club relocated the team to Fengtai District, Beijing, and changed their name to Beijing Renhe. Throughout the club's history their greatest achievement has been winning the 2013 Chinese FA Cup while the highest position they have ever finished was second within the 2003 season.

== History ==
logo of Shanghai Pudong Football Club in 1995

The club was founded on 3 February 1995 in Pudong District, Shanghai to take part in the recently formed fully professional football league system and they started at the bottom of the football pyramid in the third division, where they named themselves Shanghai Pudong. Playing in all blue in their debut season, they would immediately taste success when they won the division title and promotion to the second tier. The following seasons, however, saw the team languish within the division until they brought in Xu Genbao to manage the side at the beginning of the 2000 season and would make the club promotion contenders. Under Xu Genbao's leadership, they didn't have to wait long to win promotion when they would go on to win the division title at the end of the season and a chance to play in the top tier. Under the ownership of Shanghai Yungtay Engineering and COSCO Real Estate, the club rebranded themselves with a new blue and white striped football kit. They were big spenders who wanted to achieve immediate success by bringing in established Chinese internationals such as Cheng Yaodong, Jiang Jin and particularly Wu Chengying who set a Chinese transfer fee record of 13,000,000 RMB. This saw them become genuine title contenders and under their new manager Cheng Yaodong, they would fight for the league title with Shanghai Greenland Shenhua and only come second by a single point at the end of the 2003 season. On 13 June 2012, it was discovered by the police the real reason the team lost the 2003 title was because the club's players Shen Si, Qi Hong, Jiang Jin and Li Ming took a bribe from former Tianjin TEDA general manager Yang Yifeng to lose their 30 November 2003 game, which saw all offending participants fined and jailed for their crimes.

logo of Shanghai Yungtay Football Clubin 2005

The owners could not maintain the level of spending that they had done and the team's results would start to slip. Finding that they could not compete with Shanghai Shenhua and in the 2005 season, they had to face additional competition in Shanghai Zobon, the team decided to move to Xi'an after months of speculation. With the newly branded team known as Shanghai International, they would start to move away from the previous Yuanshen Stadium in Shanghai to the Shaanxi Province Stadium in Xi'an, Shaanxi Province and rename themselves Xi'an Chanba International by 2006. In 2007, their ownership was transferred to Baorong Investment and it was during this period that the club would start to experiment with a new yellow football kit. This would surprisingly seem to work when the club looked as if they were title contenders once more during the 2008 season, however their title hopes quickly faded and the team eventually finished fifth. The following season, however, would see the team languish near the bottom of the table and Cheng Yaodong decided to resign, which would see former Chinese national football coach Zhu Guanghu come in and guide the team away from the relegation zone.

At the beginning of the 2010 season, Dai Yongge and the Renhe Commercial Holdings Company started to invest heavily within the club. This would see the club bring in Chinese internationals Sun Jihai, Zhao Xuri, Qu Bo and Mao Jianqing into the team. However, despite the signings, the club struggled within the league and Zhu Guanghu left the club while three time Chinese league winner Milorad Kosanović replaced him. Milorad Kosanović's reign at the club was unsuccessful and he was soon replaced by Slobodan Santrač. After a poor string of results, Slobodan Santrač was fired and former Chinese international manager Gao Hongbo came into the club while it languished in mid-table throughout much of the 2011 season. After another disappointing season, Dai Yongge would start to get frustrated at the team's lack of success and decided to take advantage of Guiyang's government promise of the recently developed Guiyang Olympic Centre for the club, and with Renhe Commercial Holdings Company having better business connections within Guiyang, the club decided that it would move the team, which has recently made them one of the best supported teams in China. The 2012 season saw Guizhou have a successful year, with the club achieving fourth place and gaining entry into its first AFC Champions League.

The team's success continued as they qualified for the 2014 AFC Champions League as well, but got knocked out in the group stage both times they qualified. Their top achievements in this period included winning the 2014 Chinese FA Super Cup and the 2013 Chinese FA Cup. In the 2015 season they were relegated to the League One, but the team managed to advance back to the Super League in 2018. In 2016 they moved from Guizhou to Beijing, becoming Beijing Renhe. After one season where they placed eighth, in 2019 the club struggled to win games and found themselves in last place with a few rounds to go.

Having lost their 2020 China League One relegation play-off matches 2–3 on aggregate to Jiangxi Liansheng, Beijing Renhe were relegated to the League Two. They changed their name to Beijing Chengfeng to meet Chinese Football Association's "neutral name" requirement, before the dissolution of the club on 29 March 2021.

== Ownership and naming history ==
| Year | Owner | Club name | Sponsored team name |
|---|---|---|---|
| 1995–96 | Shanghai Pudong New Area Social Development Bureau; Fuhao Group | Shanghai Pudong Football Club | |
| 1997–98 | Fuhao Group | Shanghai Pudong Football Club | |
| 1999 | Daqiao Group | Shanghai Pudong Football Club | Shanghai Pudong Whirlpool |
| 2000 | Daqiao Group | Shanghai Pudong Football Club | Pudong Lianyang 8848 |
| 2001–02 | Shanghai COSCO Liangwan Real Estate Development Co., Ltd; Shanghai Huili Group Co., Ltd; Hainan Bo'ao Investment Holding Co., Ltd | Shanghai COSCO Huili Football Club | |
| 2003 | Shanghai COSCO Sanlin Real Estate Group Co., Ltd | Shanghai COSCO Sanlin Football Club | |
| 2003–04 | Shanghai COSCO Sanlin Real Estate Group Co., Ltd | Shanghai COSCO Sanlin Football Club | Shanghai International |
| 2005 | Shanghai Yungtay Holding Group Co., Ltd | Shanghai Yungtay Football Club | Shanghai International |
| 2006 | Shanghai Yungtay Holding Group Co., Ltd | Shanghai Yungtay Football Club | Xi'an Chanba International |
| 2007–09 | Beijing Baorong Investing Management Co., Ltd | Shaanxi Baorong Chanba Football Club | Shaanxi Neo-China Chanba |
| 2009 | Beijing Baorong Investing Management Co., Ltd | Shaanxi Baorong Chanba Football Club | Shaanxi Greenland Chanba |
| 2010 | Beijing Baorong Investing Management Co., Ltd | Shaanxi Baorong Chanba Football Club | Shaanxi Zhongjian Chanba |
| 2011 | Beijing Baorong Investing Management Co., Ltd | Shaanxi Baorong Chanba Football Club | Shaanxi Renhe Commercial Chanba |
| 2012 | Renhe Commercial Holding Co., Ltd | Shaanxi Baorong Chanba Football Club | Guizhou Renhe Moutai |
| 2013–15 | Renhe Commercial Holding Co., Ltd | Guizhou Renhe Football Club | Guizhou Moutai |
| 2016–20 | Renhe Commercial Holding Co., Ltd | Beijing Renhe Football Club | |
| 2021 | Renhe Commercial Holding Co., Ltd | Beijing Chengfeng Football Club | |

== Crest and colours ==
When the club originated their home colours would predominantly be blue until the club won promotion to the top tier and decided that they needed to differentiate themselves from their local rivals Shanghai Greenland Shenhua, who also play in blue. This saw them employ a blue and white stripe top at the beginning of the 2003 league season and a new crest design of a horse in front of a striped background which was directly inspired by Juventus FC own logo. When the club was bought out by Baorong Investments who moved the club to Xi'an they decided that the club should use a new yellow top by the beginning of the 2008 league season and a new crest of a wolf was employed. When the Renhe Commercial Holdings Company bought a majority within the club they wanted to try out a new all black kit during the 2011 league season, however this colour did not last very long and when the company decided to move the club to Guizhou the club decided they needed a new kit to signify this move and launched an all orange kit at the beginning of the 2012 league season.

=== Kit evolution ===
| 2002 | 2003–2007 | 2008–09 | 2010 | 2011 | 2012 | 2013–2016 |

== Rivalries ==
When the club was founded in Shanghai they decided to take advantage of the 1994 Chinese football league professionalism reforms that allowed more than one club in each city. With Shanghai Shenhua already established within the city the potential for China's first top-flight city derby emerged. On 9 March 2002 the first top-flight city derby became a reality when they met in a league game, which saw the club win 2–0 away to Shenhua in front of a sold out Hongkou Football Stadium. Known as the Shanghai derby it would be the start of an intense but short rivalry between the two clubs, which reached its peak on the final day of the 2003 league season with both teams able to win the league title. Shenhua won their game while the club surprisingly lost theirs to relegation fighting club Tianjin TEDA. This saw critics dispute the title win and it was eventually discovered that both teams had players and officials match-fix games throughout the campaign. Shenhua would retrospectively lose their title while the club owners decided it was financially unviable to remain in Shanghai and relocated their team to Xi'an, which effectively ended the rivalry.

== Foreign players ==
Africa

- (Kenya) Ayub Masika

Europe
Bosnia and Herzegovina

- (Bosnia and Herzegovina) Zvjezdan Misimović
- (Bosnia and Herzegovina) Sejad Salihović
- (Bosnia and Herzegovina) Zlatan Muslimović

Bulgaria

- (Bulgaria) Metodi Stoynev

Croatia

- (Croatia) Ivan Bulat
- (Croatia) Ivan Brečević
- (Croatia) Nikica Jelavić

Germany

- (Germany) Mike Hanke

Italy

- (Italy) Fabio Firmani

Netherlands

- (Netherlands) Elvis Manu

Poland

- (Poland) Krzysztof Mączyński

Scotland

- (Scotland) Derek Riordan

Serbia

- (Serbia) Miloš Bajalica

Slovakia

- (Slovakia) Tomáš Oravec

Spain

- (Spain) Rafa Jordà
- (Spain) Rubén Suárez
- (Spain) Nano

Sweden

- (Sweden) Magnus Erkisson
- (Sweden) Guillermo Molins

North America

- (Guatemala) Marvin Ávila

South America
Argentina

- (Argentina) Augusto Fernández

== Coaching staff ==
=== Managerial history ===
Managers who have coached the club and team since Guizhou Renhe was formed.

- (China) Wang Houjun (1995–96)
- (China) Zheng Yan (1996)
- (Uruguay) Marcelo (1997)
- (Uruguay) Sundli (1997)
- (China) Zheng Yan (1998)
- (China) Yin Lihua (1998–99)
- (England) Bob Houghton (2000)
- (China) Xi Zhikang (2000)
- (China) Xu Genbao (1 Nov 2000 – 30 Nov 2001)
- (France) Claude Le Roy (1 July 2001 – 30 June 2003)
- (China) Cheng Yaodong (1 May 2003 – 27 Aug 2009)
- (China) Gong Lei (interim)
- (China) Zhu Guanghu (1 July 2009 – 30 June 2010)
- (Serbia) Milorad Kosanović (1 May 2010 – 31 Dec 2011)
- (Serbia) Slobodan Santrač (19 July 2011 – 22 Sept 2011)
- (China) Gao Hongbo (1 Jan 2012 – 30 Nov 2012)
- (China) Gong Lei (interim) (17 Dec 2012 – 23 April 2014)
- (China) Zhu Jiong (interim) (23 April 2014 – 28 April 2015)
- (China) Li Chunman (interim) (28 April 2015 – 8 July 2015)
- (China) Gong Lei (8 July 2015 – 8 December 2015)
- (China) Wang Baoshan (8 December 2015 – 8 June 2017)
- (Spain) Luis García Plaza (8 June 2017 – 10 December 2018)
- (Serbia) Aleksandar Stanojević (18 December 2018– 9 July 2019)
- (Spain) Luis García Plaza (9 July 2019– 12 November 2019)
- (China) Wang Bo (12 November 2019- )

== Honours ==
=== League ===
- Chinese Jia-A League/Chinese Super League
  - Runner-up (1): 2003
- Chinese Jia B League/Chinese League One
  - Winners (1): 2001
  - Runner-up (1): 2017
- Chinese Yi League/Chinese League Two
  - Winners (1): 1995

=== Cup ===
- Chinese FA Cup
  - Winners (1): 2013
  - Runner-up (1): 2012
- Chinese FA Super Cup
  - Winners (1): 2014

== Results ==
=== All-time league rankings ===
As of the end of 2019 season.

| Year | Div | Pld | W | D | L | GF | GA | GD | Pts | Pos. | FA Cup | Super Cup | League Cup | AFC | Other | | Att./G | Stadium |
|---|---|---|---|---|---|---|---|---|---|---|---|---|---|---|---|---|---|---|
| 1995 | 3 | 8 | 5 | 1 | 2 | | | | 16 | W | DNQ | DNQ | – | – | | | | Chuansha Stadium |
| 1996 | 2 | 22 | 6 | 5 | 11 | 17 | 31 | −14 | 23 | 9 | R3 | DNQ | – | – | | | | Chuansha Stadium |
| 1997 | 2 | 22 | 7 | 6 | 9 | 23 | 23 | 0 | 27 | 10 | R2 | DNQ | – | – | | | | Chuansha Stadium |
| 1998 | 2 | 22 | 8 | 4 | 10 | 20 | 27 | −7 | 28 | 7 | R1 | DNQ | – | – | | | | Chuansha Stadium |
| 1999 | 2 | 22 | 10 | 6 | 6 | 32 | 30 | 2 | 36 | 4 | R1 | DNQ | – | – | | | | Chuansha Stadium |
| 2000 | 2 | 22 | 7 | 12 | 3 | 28 | 22 | 6 | 33 | 4 | R2 | DNQ | – | – | | | | Yuanshen Sports Centre Stadium |
| 2001 | 2 | 22 | 14 | 4 | 4 | 51 | 21 | 30 | 46 | W | R1 | DNQ | – | – | | | | Shanghai Stadium |
| 2002 | 1 | 28 | 9 | 8 | 11 | 37 | 39 | −2 | 35 | 9 | QF | DNQ | – | – | | | 17,500 | Shanghai Stadium |
| 2003 | 1 | 28 | 16 | 6 | 6 | 39 | 26 | 13 | 54 | RU | QF | DNQ | – | – | | | 17,821 | Shanghai Stadium |
| 2004 | 1 | 22 | 8 | 8 | 6 | 39 | 31 | 8 | 32 | 3 | R2 | NH | R2 | – | A3 | 4 | 8,455 | Shanghai Stadium |
| 2005 | 1 | 26 | 8 | 7 | 11 | 30 | 32 | −2 | 31 | 8 | R3 | NH | R1 | – | | | 4,385 | Shanghai Stadium |
| 2006 | 1 | 28 | 8 | 12 | 8 | 33 | 34 | −1 | 36 | 9 | R1 | NH | NH | – | | | 17,286 | Shaanxi Province Stadium |
| 2007 | 1 | 28 | 4 | 14 | 10 | 24 | 29 | −5 | 26 | 13 | NH | NH | NH | – | | | 24,643 | Shaanxi Province Stadium |
| 2008 | 1 | 30 | 15 | 7 | 8 | 41 | 29 | 12 | 52 | 5 | NH | NH | NH | – | | | 24,625 | Shaanxi Province Stadium |
| 2009 | 1 | 30 | 9 | 10 | 11 | 26 | 24 | 2 | 37 | 12 | NH | NH | NH | – | | | 23,026 | Shaanxi Province Stadium |
| 2010 | 1 | 30 | 9 | 10 | 11 | 33 | 36 | −3 | 37 | 10 | NH | NH | NH | – | | | 28,053 | Shaanxi Province Stadium |
| 2011 | 1 | 30 | 10 | 8 | 12 | 34 | 41 | −7 | 38 | 9 | QF | NH | NH | – | | | 27,836 | Shaanxi Province Stadium |
| 2012 | 1 | 30 | 12 | 9 | 9 | 44 | 33 | 11 | 45 | 4 | RU | DNQ | NH | – | | | 29,574 | Guiyang Olympic Sports Center |
| 2013 | 1 | 30 | 11 | 11 | 8 | 40 | 41 | −1 | 44 | 4 | W | DNQ | NH | Group | | | 21,312 | Guiyang Olympic Sports Center |
| 2014 | 1 | 30 | 11 | 8 | 11 | 33 | 35 | −2 | 41 | 6 | R4 | W | NH | Group | | | 12,327 | Guiyang Olympic Sports Center |
| 2015 | 1 | 30 | 7 | 8 | 15 | 39 | 52 | −13 | 29 | 15 | QF | DNQ | NH | – | | | 15,139 | Guiyang Olympic Sports Center |
| 2016 | 2 | 30 | 15 | 4 | 11 | 49 | 35 | 14 | 49 | 4 | R3 | DNQ | NH | – | | | 4,542 | Beijing Fengtai Stadium |
| 2017 | 2 | 30 | 18 | 8 | 4 | 48 | 21 | 27 | 62 | RU | R3 | DNQ | NH | – | | | 6,494 | Beijing Fengtai Stadium |
| 2018 | 1 | 30 | 9 | 10 | 11 | 33 | 46 | −13 | 37 | 8 | R5 | DNQ | NH | – | | | 12,534 | Beijing Fengtai Stadium |
| 2019 | 1 | 30 | 3 | 5 | 22 | 26 | 65 | -39 | 14 | 16 | R5 | DNQ | NH | – | | | 7,545 | Beijing Fengtai Stadium |
| 2020 | 2 | 17 | 6 | 3 | 8 | 22 | 27 | -5 | 21 | 17 | DNQ | DNQ | NH | – | | | | |

Key

| | China top division |
| | China second division |
| | China third division |
| W | Winners |
| RU | Runners-up |
| 3 | Third place |
| | Relegated |

- Pld = Played
- W = Games won
- D = Games drawn
- L = Games lost
- F = Goals for
- A = Goals against
- Pts = Points
- Pos = Final position
- DNQ = Did not qualify
- DNE = Did not enter
- NH = Not Held
- – = Does Not Exist
- R1 = Round 1
- R2 = Round 2
- R3 = Round 3
- R4 = Round 4
- F = Final
- SF = Semi-finals
- QF = Quarter-finals
- R16 = Round of 16
- Group = Group stage
- GS2 = Second Group stage
- QR1 = First Qualifying Round
- QR2 = Second Qualifying Round
- QR3 = Third Qualifying Round

=== Continental results ===
| Season | Competition | Round | Opposition | Home | Away | Rank /Agg. |
|---|---|---|---|---|---|---|
| 2013 | AFC Champions League | Group stage | (Japan) Kashiwa Reysol | 0–1 | 1–1 | 3rd |
| 2013 | AFC Champions League | Group stage | (South Korea) Suwon Samsung Bluewings | 2–2 | 0–0 | 3rd |
| 2013 | AFC Champions League | Group stage | (Australia) Central Coast Mariners | 2–1 | 1–2 | 3rd |
| 2014 | AFC Champions League | Group stage | (Japan) Kawasaki Frontale | 0–1 | 0–1 | 4th |
| 2014 | AFC Champions League | Group stage | (Australia) Western Sydney Wanderers | 0–1 | 0–5 | 4th |
| 2014 | AFC Champions League | Group stage | (South Korea) Ulsan Hyundai | 3–1 | 1–1 | 4th |
