= Beijing Hongdeng F.C. =

Chinese football club

Beijing Hongdeng 北京宏登
- Full name: Beijing Hongdeng F.C. 北京宏登足球俱乐部
- Founded: 1997; 28 years ago
- Dissolved: 2010; 15 years ago
- Ground: Shijingshan Stadium, Beijing
- Capacity: 20,000
- League: Chinese Jia League
- 2009: Chinese Jia League, 11th
Home colours	Away colours

Beijing Hongdeng (Simplified Chinese: 北京宏登) was a professional football club located in Beijing, China. It was founded in the 1997 and was taken over by Beijing Baxy F.C. at the beginning of the 2010 league season.

== Name history ==
- 1997–2002 Beijing Longli 北京龙力
- 2003–2010 Beijing Hongdeng 北京宏登

== Results ==
- As of the end of 2009 season

All-time League Rankings

Season	2001	2002	2003	2004	2005	2006	2007	2008	2009
Division	3	3	3	3	3	2	2	2	2
Position	6	5	7	3	2	12	9	12	11

- ^1 in 2nd phase group stage
- ^2 in North League
