= 2009 China League One =

China League One
- Season: 2009
- Champions: Liaoning Whowin
- Promoted: Liaoning Whowin; Nanchang Bayi Hengyuan
- Relegated: Sichuan
- Matches: 156
- Goals: 445 (2.85 per match)
- Top goalscorer: Martín García (19 goals)
- Biggest home win: Shenyang 5–0 Sichuan (9 May); Nanchang 6–1 Sichuan (15 Aug); Shanghai 6–1 Sichuan (28 Aug); Shanghai 5–0 Pudong (18 Oct); Nanchang 5–0 Yanbian (18 Oct); Nanchang 6–1 Nanjing (25 Oct)
- Biggest away win: Sichuan 0–3 Qingdao (2 Sep)
- Highest scoring: Qingdao 5–4 Sichuan (25 Apr)

The 2009 China League One was the sixth season since the establishment. The season kicked off on 28 March 2009 and ended on 25 October 2009.

Winners and runners-up were promoted to Chinese Super League next season and the last placed team was relegated to League Two. League One would be expanded to 14 teams the season after.

Zhu Zhengrong of Shanghai East Asia scored the first hat-trick of the season against Sichuan at Shanghai Stadium on 28 August 2009.

Léo Gamalho of Shenyang Dongjin scored the second hat-trick of the season against Nanchang Bayi Hengyuan at Shenyang Olympic Stadium on 10 October 2009.

Martin García of Nanchang Bayi Hengyuan scored the third hat-trick of the season against Nanjing Yoyo at Bayi Stadium on 25 October 2009.

== Promotion and relegation ==
After 2008 season, Jiangsu Sainty and Chongqing Lifan were promoted to 2009 Chinese Super League and Yantai Yiteng were relegated to 2009 China League Two. They were replaced by Guangdong Sunray Cave and Shenyang Dongjin which were promoted from 2008 China League Two and Liaoning Whowin who were relegated from 2008 Chinese Super League.

== League table ==
Pos	Team	Pld	W	D	L	GF	GA	GD	Pts	Promotion or relegation
1	Liaoning Whowin (C, P)	24	18	3	3	49	17	+32	57	Promotion to Chinese Super League
2	Nanchang Bayi Hengyuan (P)	24	14	5	5	48	22	+26	47	Promotion to Chinese Super League
3	Shenyang Dongjin	24	12	8	4	39	21	+18	44 (Note: Shenyang: 4 pts, 3–2; Shanghai: 1 pt, 2–3)	
4	Shanghai East Asia	24	13	5	6	43	25	+18	44	
5	Guangdong Sunray Cave	24	10	5	9	37	37	0	35	
6	Yanbian	24	7	8	9	29	30	−1	29 (Note: Yanbian: 6 pts, 5–1; Anhui: 0 pts, 1–5)	
7	Anhui Jiufang	24	7	8	9	35	44	−9	29	
8	Beijing BIT	24	7	7	10	29	33	−4	28	
9	Shanghai Zobon	24	7	6	11	23	35	−12	27	
10	Qingdao Hailifeng	24	7	5	12	38	45	−7	26	Disbanded after season
11	Beijing Hongdeng	24	5	7	12	26	36	−10	22	Disbanded after season
12	Nanjing Yoyo	24	5	9	10	23	40	−17	18 (Note: Nanjing Yoyo were docked 6 points for debt dispute and breaking the FIFA regulations in the payment of foreign players)	
13	Sichuan (R)	24	4	4	16	26	60	−34	16	Relegation to China League Two

Updated to match(es) played on 25 Oct 2009. Source: 2009 China League One table
Rules for classification: 1st points; 2nd head-to-head points; 3rd head-to-head goal difference; 4th head-to-head goals scored; 5th goal difference; 6th goals scored; 7th disciplinary points (1 point for each yellow card, 3 points for each red card).
(C) Champions; (P) Promoted; (R) Relegated

== Results ==
Home \ Away	AH	BJH	BJT	GD	LN	NC	NJ	SHZ	QD	SHE	SY	SC	YB
Anhui Jiufang		3–2	2–0	3–2	3–2	1–1	1–1	2–1	4–4	1–2	0–0	5–2	0–2
Beijing Hongdeng	1–2		0–1	2–2	0–1	1–0	3–1	1–1	4–0	1–2	1–1	0–1	1–1
Beijing BIT	5–2	1–0		3–0	1–1	0–1	2–1	0–0	2–2	1–1	2–1	2–1	0–0
Guangdong Sunray Cave	3–2	1–1	3–1		2–1	3–1	1–0	4–0	1–0	4–2	1–2	2–0	2–0
Liaoning Whowin	2–0	3–1	3–1	3–1		0–1	5–1	5–0	2–0	2–0	1–1	3–0	2–1
Nanchang Bayi Hengyuan	1–1	3–0	3–1	3–0	0–1		6–1	3–0	1–0	3–1	2–1	6–1	5–0
Nanjing Yoyo	2–1	0–2	2–0	2–0	1–3	1–1		0–0	0–0	1–0	0–0	2–0	1–1
Shanghai Zobon	0–0	5–1	2–2	3–1	0–1	0–2	2–2		1–0	2–1	1–0	2–0	0–1
Qingdao Hailifeng	4–0	1–3	2–1	1–1	1–2	2–3	4–2	2–1		0–2	1–2	5–4	3–1
Shanghai East Asia	0–0	3–0	2–1	1–0	0–0	2–1	4–0	2–0	4–1		2–3	6–1	2–1
Shenyang Dongjin	0–0	3–1	1–1	1–1	1–2	5–1	1–0	1–0	4–2	0–0		5–0	2–0
Sichuan	4–1	0–0	1–0	2–2	0–2	0–0	2–2	1–2	0–3	1–3	0–1		3–2
Yanbian	3–1	0–0	2–1	3–0	1–2	0–0	0–0	3–0	0–0	1–1	2–3	4–1	

Source: China League One Results on Sina.com
Legend: Blue = home team win; Yellow = draw; Red = away team win.

== Top scorers ==
Updated to games played on 25 Oct 2009

Rank	Player	Team	Goals
1	(Colombia) Martín García	Nanchang Bayi Hengyuan	19
2	(China) Yang Xu	Liaoning Whowin	15
3	(Romania) Sabin Ilie	Qingdao Hailifeng	14
4	(Brazil) Rodrigo Paulista	Shenyang Dongjin	11
5	(Brazil) Anderson	Liaoning Whowin	10
5	(Cameroon) Guy Madjo	Guangdong Sunray Cave	10
