= Hohhot Black Horse F.C. =

Chinese football club

Hohhot Black Horse 呼和浩特黑马
- Full name: Hohhot Black Horse Sport 呼和浩特黑马体育
- Founded: 2002; 23 years ago
- Dissolved: 2007; 18 years ago
- Ground: Hohhot People's Stadium, Hohhot, China
- Capacity: 30,000
Home colours	Away colours

Hohhot Black Horse (Chinese: 呼和浩特黑马) is a defunct Chinese football club based in Hohhot, China and were based at the Hohhot People's Stadium.

Founded as Beijing Zangying Xuequan, a team based in Beijing but dedicated to unearthing and developing Tibetan football talents, and later renamed as Xizang Huitong Luhua, the team played in the Yi League until 2005, when they purchased Dalian Changbo from the upper Jia League in 2006. The newly merged team was moved to Taiyuan, Shanxi and renamed to Shanxi Wosen Luhu, but relocated again to Hohhot, Inner Mongolia in 2007 and renamed themselves Hohhot Black Horse, then withdrew mid-season and dissolved.

In November 2009, the former club general manager Wang Pu and deputy general manager Wang Xin were arrested and later convicted, becoming the first case in the 2009 "Chinese football anti-betting storm".

== Name history ==
- 2002–03: Beijing Zangying Xuequan (北京藏鹰雪泉)
- 2004–05: Xizang Huitong Luhua (西藏惠通陆华)
- 2006: Shanxi Wosen Luhu (山西沃森路虎)
- 2007: Hohhot Black Horse (呼和浩特黑马)

== Results ==
- As of the end of 2007 season

All-time league Ranking

Season	2002	2003	2004	2005	2006	2007
Division	3	3	3	3	2	2
Position	16	5^{1}	7^{2}	6	9	13

- ^1 In group stage.
- ^2 In North Group.
