= Qingdao Hailifeng F.C. =

Chinese football club

Qingdao Hailifeng 青岛海利丰
- Full name: Qingdao Hailifeng Football Club 青岛海利丰足球俱乐部
- Nickname: Hailifeng
- Founded: 7 January 1995; 31 years ago
- Dissolved: 2010; 16 years ago
- Ground: Etsong Sports Center, Qingdao, Shandong, China
- Capacity: 62,000
- 2009: Chinese Jia League, 10th
Home colours	Away colours

Qingdao Hailifeng F.C. (Chinese: 青岛海利丰足球俱乐部), previously named Qingdao JVC Zhengyi, Qingdao Benda and Hefei Chuangyi was a former professional association football club in the Chinese Football Association Jia League. The club was engaged in "bribery and private business dealing" in matches held in 2007 and 2009 and was banned from all future national matches organised by the Chinese Football Association.

== History ==
Qingdao JVC Zhengyi Football Club was founded on 7 January 1995, and was renamed Qingdao Benda in 1997 and Qingdao Hailifeng in 1998. It had been a regular in China League Two until it bought Guangdong Winnerway and its place in Jia B League in December 2001, After 4 years of failure to win promotion, after the Guangdong Winnerway Group lost their patience after 4 years of failure to win promotion and agreed to sell their Jia B team to Qingdao Hailifeng.

On February 21, 2010, the club was found guilty for accepting a bribe from Chengdu Blades and had their registration cancelled as well as being fined 200,000 RMB for their crime. It was discovered that the club deliberately lost a key game 2–0 during the 2007 league season for up to 500,000 RMB to allow Chengdu Blades to win promotion.

== Name history ==
The Qingdao club has changed its name, its home stadium, and even its home city due to financial reasons.

Their previous names include:

- 1995–1996: Qingdao JVC Zhengyi 青岛JVC正义 (Qingdao)
- 1997: Qingdao Benda 青岛奔达 (Qingdao)
- 1998–2001: Qingdao Hailifeng 青岛海利丰 (Qingdao)
- 2002: Hefei Chuangyi 合肥创亿 (Hefei)
- 2003–2010: Qingdao Hailifeng 青岛海利丰 (Qingdao)

== Results ==
- As of the end of 2009 season

All-time league Ranking

Season	1995	1996	1997	1998	1999	2000	2001	2002	2003	2004	2005	2006	2007	2008	2009
Division	3	3	3	3	3	3	3	2	2	2	2	2	2	2	2
Position	4^{2}	5^{1}	3^{1}	4	3	5^{3}	5	4	13	11	6	7	7	7	10

- ^Note 1: in group stage
- ^Note 2: in Final Group 3
- ^Note 3: in Final North Group
