= China League One =

Association football league in China

- Organising body: Chinese Professional Football League
- Founded: 2004; 22 years ago
- Country: China
- Confederation: AFC
- Number of clubs: 16
- Level on pyramid: 2
- Promotion to: Chinese Super League
- Relegation to: China League Two
- Domestic cup: Chinese FA Cup
- Current champions: Liaoning Tieren (1st title) (2025)
- Most championships: Dalian Professional; Guangzhou; Henan (2 titles each)
- Broadcaster(s): PPTV, Dongqiudi (live streaming)
- Website: cfl-china.cn
- Current: 2026 China League One

The Chinese Football League 1 (Chinese: 中国足球甲级联赛; pinyin: Zhōngguó Zúqiú Xiéhuì Jiǎjí Liánsài), also known as China League One or Chinese Jia League (Chinese: 中甲联赛), is the second level of professional football in China, under the Chinese Super League. The league is under the auspices of the Chinese Football Association and operated by the Chinese Professional Football League (CFL).

Prior to the formation of the Chinese Super League, Jia League was known as Jia B League. The then top two levels of Chinese football league were known as Jia A League and Jia B League respectively. Jia A was rebranded as CSL and Jia B was rebranded as the current Jia League in 2004. Below the Jia League is the Yi League, following the Chinese Heavenly Stems naming convention of numbers.

It is currently made up of 16 teams, playing each other home and away once. At the end of each season, the top two teams are promoted to the CSL and the two lowest placed teams from the CSL are relegated to China League Two. The top two teams from China League Two are promoted and replace the two lowest placed teams from China League One.

== Current clubs ==
Club		Home City	Stadium	Capacity	Seasons in League One	Best finish	Worst finish	Spell in level 2	Head coach
Club name	Name in Chinese	Home City	Stadium	Capacity	Seasons in League One	Best finish	Worst finish	Spell in level 2	Head coach
Chongqing Tonglianglong	重庆铜梁龙	Chongqing	Tongliang Long Stadium	20,000	2024 to 2025			from 2024	(Spain) Salva Suay
Dalian K'un City	大连鲲城	Dalian	Jinzhou Stadium	30,776	2025			from 2025	(China) Zhao Faqing
Foshan Nanshi	佛山南狮	Foshan	Nanhai Sports Center	20,000	2023 to 2025	7th, 2023	7th, 2023	from 2023	(China) Zhou Chenhan
Guangdong GZ-Power	广东广州豹	Guangzhou	Huangpu Sports Center	12,000	2025			from 2025	(China) Li Bing
Guangxi Pingguo	广西平果	Pingguo	Pingguo Stadium	30,000	2022 to 2025	4th, 2023	11th, 2022	from 2022	
Jiangxi Dingnan United	定南赣联	Dingnan	Dingnan Youth Football Training Center	12,000	2018 to 2025	4th, 2019	15th, 2020	from 2018	(China) Wang Helong
Liaoning Tieren	辽宁铁人	Shenyang	Shenyang Olympic Sports Center Stadium	60,000	2020 to 2025	4th, 2024	16th, 2021	from 2020	(China) Li Jinyu
Nanjing City	南京城市	Nanjing	Wutaishan Stadium	22,000	2021 to 2025	5th, 2023	10th, 2021, 2022	from 2021	(China) Zhang Xiaofeng
Nantong Zhiyun	南通支云	Rugao	Rugao Olympic Sports Center	25,000	2025			from 2025	(Portugal) David Patrício
Qingdao Red Lions	青岛红狮	Qingdao	Qingdao Tiantai Stadium	20,525	2024 to 2025				(China) Ma Yongkang
Shaanxi Union	陕西联合	Xi'an	Weinan Sports Center Stadium	32,000	2025			from 2025	(Netherlands) Edwin Petersen
Shanghai Jiading Huilong	上海嘉定汇龙	Shanghai	Jiading Stadium	9,704	2022 to 2025	11th, 2023	13th, 2022	from 2022	(China) Duan Xin
Shenzhen Juniors	深圳青年人	Shenzhen	Longhua Cultural and Sports Center	5,360	2025			from 2025	(China) Zhang Jun
Shijiazhuang Gongfu	石家庄功夫	Shijiazhuang	Yutong International Sports Center	38,000	2022 to 2025	3rd, 2023	4th, 2022	from 2022	(China) Liu Cheng
Suzhou Dongwu	苏州东吴	Suzhou	Suzhou Sports Center	35,000	2020 to 2025	6th, 2022	14th, 2023	from 2020	(South Korea) Kim Dae-eui
Yanbian Longding	延边龙鼎	Yanji	Yanji Stadium	30,000	2023 to 2025	8th, 2023	8th, 2023	from 2023	(South Korea) Lee Ki-hyung

=== Locations ===
Locations of the 2025 China League One teams

== Former clubs ==
Club		Home City	Stadium	Capacity	Seasons in League One	Best finish	Worst finish	Current league
Pinyin name	Chinese name	Home City	Stadium	Capacity	Seasons in League One	Best finish	Worst finish	Current league
Sichuan F.C.	四川足球俱乐部	Chengdu	Dujiangyan Phoenix Stadium	12,700	2008 to 2009	5th, 2008	13th, 2009	Inactive
Xi'an Anxinyuan	西安安馨园	Xi'an			2004	17th, 2004		Inactive
Jinan Xingzhou	济南兴洲	Jinan	Zaozhuang Sports and Cultural Centre Stadium	31,284	2023	6th, 2023		Defunct
Zibo Cuju	淄博蹴鞠	Zibo	Zibo Sports Center Stadium	45,000	2021 to 2022	11th, 2021	15th, 2022	Defunct
Kunshan F.C.	昆山足球俱乐部	Kunshan	Kunshan Stadium	30,000	2020 to 2022	1st, 2022	9th, 2021	Defunct
Shaanxi Chang'an Athletic	陕西长安竞技	Xi'an	Shaanxi Province Stadium	42,383	2019 to 2022	5th, 2022	11th, 2020	Defunct
Xinjiang Tianshan Leopard	新疆天山雪豹	Ürümqi	Xinjiang Sports Centre	42,300	2013 to 2022	8th, 2015	18th, 2020, 2021	Defunct
Beijing BSU	北京北体大	Beijing	Olympic Sports Centre (Beijing)	36,228	2010 to 2022	4th, 2014, 2015	16th, 2022	Defunct
Guizhou F.C.	贵州足球俱乐部	Guiyang	Guiyang Olympic Sports Center	51,636	2011, 2013, 2015 to 2016, 2019 to 2021	2nd, 2016	16th, 2013	Defunct
Taizhou Yuanda	泰州远大	Taizhou	Taixing Sports Center	8,000	2020	6th, 2020		Defunct
Beijing Renhe	北京人和	Fengtai	Beijing Fengtai Stadium	31,043	2016 to 2017, 2020	2nd, 2017	4th, 2016	Defunct
Inner Mongolia Zhongyou	内蒙古中优	Hohhot	Hohhot City Stadium	51,632	2015 to 2020	6th, 2015	13th, 2018	Defunct
Sichuan Longfor	四川隆发	Dujiangyan	Dujiangyan Phoenix Stadium	12,700	2019	14th, 2019		Defunct
Qingdao Huanghai	青岛黄海	Qingdao	Conson Stadium	45,000	2014 to 2019	1st, 2019	12th, 2014	Defunct
Liaoning F.C.	辽宁足球俱乐部	Shenyang	Tiexi New District Sports Center	30,000	2009, 2018 to 2019	1st, 2009	15th, 2019	Defunct
Shanghai Shenxin	上海申鑫	Jinshan	Jinshan Football Stadium	30,000	2006 to 2009, 2016 to 2019	2nd, 2009	16th, 2019	Defunct
Dalian Transcendence	大连超越	Dalian	Jinzhou Stadium	30,776	2016 to 2018	14th, 2016, 2017	15th, 2018	Defunct
Shenzhen F.C.	深圳足球俱乐部	Shenzhen	Shenzhen Universiade Sports Centre	60,334	2012 to 2018	2nd, 2018	12th, 2015	Defunct
Wuhan Zall	武汉卓尔	Wuhan	Wuhan Five Rings Sports Center	30,000	2010 to 2012, 2014 to 2018	1st, 2018	10th, 2015	Defunct
Zhejiang Yiteng	浙江毅腾	Shaoxing	Shaoxing China Textile City Sports Center	20,000	2007 to 2008, 2012 to 2013, 2015 to 2018	2nd, 2013	13th, 2008, 2016, 2017	Defunct
Yanbian Funde	延边富德	Yanji	Yanji Stadium	30,000	2005 to 2015, 2018	1st, 2015	16th, 2014	Defunct
Baoding Yingli ETS	保定英利易通	Baoding	Hebei University Stadium	20,000	2017	15th, 2017		Defunct
Yunnan Lijiang	云南丽江	Lijiang	Lijiang Sports Development Centre Stadium	20,400	2017	16th, 2017		Defunct
Dalian Professional	大连人	Dalian	Dalian Barracuda Bay Football Stadium	63,000	2011, 2015 to 2017	1st, 2011, 2017	5th, 2016	Defunct
Tianjin Quanjian	天津权健	Tianjin	Tianjin Olympic Center Stadium	60,000	2011 to 2016	1st, 2016	12th, 2011	Defunct
Hebei China Fortune	河北华夏幸福	Langfang	Langfang Stadium	30,040	2014 to 2015	2nd, 2015	14th, 2014	Defunct
Shenyang Zhongze	沈阳中泽	Shenyang	Shenyang Olympic Sports Center Stadium	60,000	2011 to 2014	6th, 2011, 2013	12th, 2012	Defunct
Guangdong Sunray Cave	广东日之泉	Xi'an	Huangpu Sports Center	12,000	2009 to 2014	3rd, 2011, 2013	13th, 2014	Defunct
Chongqing Lifan	重庆力帆	Chongqing	Chongqing Olympic Sports Center	58,680	2007 to 2008, 2011 to 2014	1st, 2014	8th, 2011	Defunct
Chengdu Tiancheng	成都天诚	Chengdu	Shuangliu Sports Center	26,000	2004 to 2007, 2010, 2012 to 2014	2nd, 2007, 2010	15th, 2014	Defunct
Chongqing F.C.	重庆足球俱乐部	Chongqing	Chongqing Olympic Sports Center	58,680	2012 to 2013	8th, 2012	15th, 2013	Defunct
Hohhot Dongjin	呼和浩特东进	Shenyang	Shenyang Urban Construction University Stadium	12,000	2009 to 2012	3rd, 2009	16th, 2012	Defunct
Guangzhou R&F	广州富力	Guangzhou	Yuexiushan Stadium	18,000	2011	2nd, 2011		Defunct
Anhui Jiufang	安徽九方	Hefei	Wuhu Olympic Stadium	40,000	2008 to 2010	4th, 2008	9th, 2010	Defunct
Shanghai Zobon	上海中邦	Shanghai	Yuanshen Sports Centre Stadium	16,000	2005 to 2010	8th, 2007	11th, 2008	Defunct
Nanjing Yoyo	南京有有	Nanjing	Wutaishan Stadium	18,000	2004 to 2010	5th, 2006	13th, 2010	Defunct
Beijing Hongdeng	北京宏登	Beijing	Shijingshan Stadium	20,000	2006 to 2009	9th, 2007	12th, 2006, 2008	Defunct
Qingdao Hailifeng	青岛海利丰	Qingdao	Conson Stadium	45,000	2004 to 2009	6th, 2005	11th, 2004	Defunct
Jiangsu Sainty	江苏舜天	Nanjing	Nanjing Olympic Sports Centre	61,443	2004 to 2008	1st, 2008	6th, 2004, 2006	Defunct
Hohhot Black Horse	呼和浩特黑马	Hohhot	Hohhot People's Stadium	30,000	2006 to 2007	9th, 2006	13th, 2007	Defunct
Hunan Shoking	湖南湘军	Changsha	Helong Stadium	55,000	2004 to 2006	12th, 2005	14th, 2004	Defunct
Dalian Changbo	大连长波	Dalian			2004 to 2005	13th, 2005	15th, 2004	Defunct
Xiamen Blue Lions	厦门蓝狮	Xiamen	Xiamen People's Stadium	32,000	2004 to 2005	1st, 2005	3rd, 2004	Defunct
Shenzhen Kejian	深圳科健	Shenzhen	2004	10th, 2004		Defunct		
Ningbo National Power	宁波国力	Harbin	Shaanxi Province Stadium	42,383	2004	12th, 2004		Defunct
Dongguan Dongcheng	东莞东城	Dongguan			2004	16th, 2004		Defunct
Shanghai United	上海联城	Shanghai	Yuanshen Sports Centre Stadium	12,000	2004	2nd, 2004		Defunct
Wuhan Huanghelou	武汉黄鹤楼	Wuhan	Wuhan Sports Center	54,000	2004	1st, 2004		Defunct
Guangzhou	广州	Guangzhou	Huadu Stadium	13,394	2004 to 2007, 2010, 2023 to 2024	1st, 2007, 2010	12th, 2023	Defunct

== Winners ==
Season	Winners	Runners-up	Third-place	Fourth-place
2004	Wuhan Huanghelou	Zhuhai Zobon	Xiamen Blue Lions	Guangzhou Pharmaceutical
2005	Xiamen Blue Lions	Changchun Yatai	Zhejiang Greentown	Guangzhou Pharmaceutical
2006	Henan Construction	Zhejiang Green Town	Guangzhou Pharmaceutical	Chengdu Blades
2007	Guangzhou Pharmaceutical	Chengdu Blades	Jiangsu Sainty	Chongqing Lifan
2008	Jiangsu Sainty	Chongqing Lifan	Nanchang Bayi Hengyuan	Anhui Jiufang
2009	Liaoning F.C.	Nanchang Bayi Hengyuan	Shenyang Dongjin	Shanghai East Asia
2010	Guangzhou Evergrande	Chengdu Blades	Yanbian F.C.	Shanghai East Asia
2011	Dalian Aerbin	Guangzhou R&F	Guangdong Sunray Cave	Hunan Billows
2012	Shanghai East Asia	Wuhan Zall	Fujian Smart Hero	Harbin Songbei Yiteng
2013	Henan Jianye	Harbin Yiteng	Guangdong Sunray Cave	Chongqing Lifan
2014	Chongqing Lifan	Shijiazhuang Yongchang	Wuhan Zall	Beijing Baxy
2015	Yanbian Changbaishan	Hebei Zhongji	Dalian Aerbin	Beijing Enterprises Group
2016	Tianjin Quanjian	Guizhou Hengfeng Zhicheng	Qingdao Huanghai	Beijing Renhe
2017	Dalian Yifang	Beijing Renhe	Shijiazhuang Ever Bright	Qingdao Huanghai
2018	Wuhan Zall	Shenzhen F.C.	Zhejiang Greentown	Qingdao Huanghai
2019	Qingdao Huanghai	Shijiazhuang Ever Bright	Guizhou Hengfeng	Heilongjiang Lava Spring
2020	Changchun Yatai	Zhejiang Energy Greentown	Kunshan F.C.	Chengdu Better City
2021	Wuhan Three Towns	Meizhou Hakka	Zhejiang Greentown	Chengdu Rongcheng
2022	Kunshan	Qingdao Hainiu	Nantong Zhiyun	Shijiazhuang Gongfu
2023	Sichuan Jiuniu	Qingdao West Coast	Shijiazhuang Gongfu	Guangxi Pingguo Haliao
2024	Yunnan Yukun	Dalian Yingbo	Guangzhou F.C.	Liaoning Tieren
2025	Liaoning Tieren	Chongqing Tonglianglong	Guangdong GZ-Power	Yabnian Longding

== Attendance ==
Season	Total attendance	Games	Average	No. Of Clubs	Promotion slots	Relegation Slots
1995	805,200	131	6,147	12	2	4
1996	1,306,800	132	9,900	12	2	2
1997	1,518,000	132	11,500	12	4	2
1998	1,808,400	132	13,700	12	2	2
1999	2,006,400	132	15,200	12	2	2
2000	2,005,500	132	15,193	12	2	2
2001	1,814,100	132	13,743	12	1	1
2002	1,018,400	132	7,715	12	-	-
2003	1,413,750	182	7,768	14	-	1
2004	1,842,900	272	6,775	17	2	2
2005	1,081,900	159	6,804	14	2	1
2006	1,190,787	156	7,633	13	2	1
2007	1,046,160	144	7,265	13	2	1
2008	654,200	156	4,194	13	2	1
2009	671,793	156	4,306	13	2	1
2010	568,000	156	3,641	13	2	1
2011	645,038	182	3,544	14	2	1
2012	958,955	240	3,996	16	2	1
2013	1,129,912	240	4,708	16	2	2
2014	1,280,121	240	5,334	16	2	2
2015	2,161,165	240	9,007	16	2	2
2016	1,493,919	240	6,225	16	2	2
2017	1,857,359	240	7,739	16	2	2
2018	1,453,980	242	6,084	16	2	2
2019	2,232,305	244	9,148	16	2	0
2020	0	141	0	16	2	0
2021	0	306	0	16	2	0
2022	0	306	0	16	2	0
2023	1,330,979	240	5,545	16	2	0

== Awards ==
=== Top scorers ===
Season	Top scorer	Club	Goals
2004	(Brazil) Will	Wuhan Huanghelou	22
2005	(Belarus) Mikalay Ryndzyuk	Guangzhou F.C.	15
2006	(Brazil) Tico	Zhejiang Green Town	15
2007	(Honduras) Luis Ramírez	Guangzhou Pharmaceutical	19
2008	(Romania) Sabin Ilie	Qingdao Hailifeng	18
2009	(Colombia) Martín García	Nanchang Bayi Hengyuan	19
2010	(China) Gao Lin	Guangzhou Evergrande	20
2011	(Honduras) Mitchel Brown^{1} (Costa Rica) Johnny Woodly	Hunan Billows; Dalian Aerbin	13
2012	(Senegal) Babacar Gueye	Shenzhen Ruby	23
2013	(Senegal) Babacar Gueye	Shenzhen Ruby	23
2014	(Brazil) Guto	Chongqing Lifan	21
2015	(South Korea) Ha Tae-kyun	Yanbian Changbaishan	26
2016	(Brazil) Luís Fabiano	Tianjin Quanjian	22
2017	(Bolivia) Marcelo Moreno^{1} (Colombia) Harold Preciado	Wuhan Zall; Shenzhen F.C.	23
2018	(Cameroon) John Mary	Meizhou Hakka	24
2019	(Democratic Republic of the Congo) Oscar Maritu	Shaanxi Chang'an Athletic	22
2020	(China) Tan Long	Changchun Yatai	11
2021	(Zimbabwe) Nyasha Mushekwi	Zhejiang Green Town	23
2022	(Nigeria) Kingsley Onuegbu	Qingdao Hainiu	27
2023	(Nigeria) Moses Ogbu	Shijiazhuang Gongfu	20
2024	(Zimbabwe) Nyasha Mushekwi	Yunnan Yukun	25
2025	(Republic of the Congo) Guy Mbenza	Liaoning Tieren	28

- ^1 Winner of 2017 China League One Golden Boot.

=== Most valuable player ===
Season	Player	Club
2013	(China) Xu Yang	Henan Jianye
2014	(China) Wang Dong	Chongqing Lifan
2015	(South Korea) Ha Tae-kyun	Yanbian Changbaishan
2016	(Brazil) Luís Fabiano	Tianjin Quanjian
2017	(Brazil) Matheus	Shijiazhuang Ever Bright
2018	(China) Ji Xiaoxuan	Zhejiang Yiteng
2019	(China) Tan Long	Changchun Yatai

=== Best goalkeeper ===
Season	Player	Club
2013	(China) Zhou Yajun	Henan Jianye
2014	(China) Wang Guoming	Shijiazhuang Yongchang
2015	(China) Chi Wenyi	Yanbian Changbaishan
2016	(China) Zhang Lu	Tianjin Quanjian
2017	(China) Zhang Lie	Beijing Renhe
2018	(China) Mou Pengfei	Heilongjiang Lava Spring
2019	(China) Xu Jiamin	Heilongjiang Lava Spring

=== Youth player of the year ===
Season	Player	Club
2016	(China) Ming Tian	Wuhan Zall
2017	(China) Wang Jinxian	Dalian Yifang
2018	(China) Zhang Hongjiang	Meizhou Hakka
2019	(China) Xu Yue	Shanghai Shenxin

=== Best coach ===
Season	Player	Club
2013	(China) Tang Yaodong	Henan Jianye
2014	(Croatia) Goran Tomić	Beijing Baxy
2015	(South Korea) Park Tae-ha	Yanbian Changbaishan
2016	(China) Li Bing	Guizhou Zhicheng
2017	(Spain) Juan Ramón López Caro	Dalian Yifang
2018	(China) Li Tie	Wuhan Zall
2019	(China) Wang Bo	Shaanxi Chang'an Athletic

== Reserve league and Elite league ==
Season	Reserve Champions	Elite Champions
2014	Wuhan Zall	Not Held
2015	Qingdao Jonoon	Not Held
2016	Beijing Enterprises Group	Not Held
2017	Wuhan Zall	Dalian Yifang
2018	Wuhan Zall	Not Held
2019	Shijiazhuang Yongchang	Not Held

== Sponsors ==
Sponsorships
Season	Sponsor	Annual Value	Official League Name
2015	58.com	¥30 million	58.com Chinese Football Association China League
2016	58.com	¥30 million	58.com Chinese Football Association China League
2017	58.com	¥35 million	58.com Chinese Football Association China League
2018	58.com	¥50 million	58.com Chinese Football Association China League

== See also ==
- Football in China
