= Shanghai Zobon F.C. =

Shanghai Zobon F.C. 上海中邦
- Full name: Shanghai Zobon Football Club 上海中邦足球俱乐部
- Founded: ?
- Dissolved: 27 December 2012; 13 years ago
- Ground: Yuanshen Sports Centre Stadium, Shanghai, China
- Capacity: 16,000
Home colours	Away colours

Shanghai Zobon F.C. (Chinese: 上海中邦足球俱乐部) is a defunct football club that predominantly competed in the China League One division. Originally founded by Zhu Jun, the CEO of The9 Limited as an undistinguished amateur club, it took over Shanghai Tianna to turn professional before the 2004 season, played their home games in the 16,000 seater Yuanshen Sports Centre Stadium in Shanghai and won the China League Two championship in the same year. In 2008, Wei Ping took ownership of the club until January 28, 2011. Guizhou Zhicheng F.C. bought significant shares of the club for 5 million Yuan and thus began to merge the two clubs. The youth and reserve players were still allowed to play under the club's name in the third tier of Chinese football until they were sold-off to Shanghai East Asia F.C. on December 27, 2012, that eventually saw the club officially dissolved.

== History ==
=== Formation ===
The club was founded near the turn of the century as Shanghai The 9 by Zhu Jun, the CEO of The9 Limited and finished 4th in the 2003 China Amateur Football League. The following season would see the club merge with professional Chinese Yi league club Shanghai Tianna, and the new club would breeze through the third tier without losing a single game while winning the playoffs of the China League Two and gaining promotion to China League One at the end of the season. The club's first season in the second tier would see them finish in ninth place within the league. Throughout the season, the club's owner wanted to unify the team by renaming the team Shanghai United, however the team's lack of immediate success saw Zhu Jun abandon these plans so he could take over top tier Chinese side Shanghai Zobon instead.

=== Separation from Zhu Jun ===
In 2005, Zhu Jun and The9 Limited purchased Shanghai Zobon, a top tier Chinese Super League team and renamed the club Shanghai United instead and tried to merge the two clubs. However, except for five players such as star midfielders Qi Hong and Jiang Kun, the rest of the players at the old Shanghai The 9 could not join the new Shanghai United, due to transfer rules in Chinese football. The remainder of the old Shanghai The 9 was bought by the Euro-China Group (Chinese: 中欧集团) who renamed the team as Shanghai Stars and made sure that the club would remain within the second tier. In the club's desperate attempts to remain within the league, they would hire a string of managers including former players Shen Si, Peng Weiguo and Cao Xiandong. This helped them stay within the league until the start of the 2008 league season. The club moved to the 30,000 seater Wuxi Sports Center in Wuxi, Jiangsu Province, and they were renamed as Wuxi Zobon. The club would also bring in experienced manager Ma Liangxing, however the move to a new city was not successful either on the field or off it and after only one year within Wuxi, the club returned to Shanghai again in the 2009 league season. The club would bring in Shen Si again and was renamed as Shanghai Zobon as well as moving into the 16,000 seater Pudong Yuanshen Sports Centre.

=== Starting over again ===
On January 28, 2011, Guizhou Zhicheng F.C. bought significant shares of the club for 5 million Yuan and thus began to merge the two clubs, while taking over their place in China League One. The former youth and reserve players were still allowed to play under the club's name in the third tier of Chinese football. This saw Cheng Yaodong brought in to manage the team in the 2011 league campaign where he guided them to a fifth-place finish. He stayed on for another season until the management decided selloff the remaining youth team players to Shanghai East Asia F.C. on December 27, 2012, that eventually marks the end of the club.

== Name history ==
- –2005: Shanghai The 9 (上海九城)
- 2006–2007: Shanghai Stars (上海群英)
- 2008: Wuxi Zobon (无锡中邦)
- 2009–2012: Shanghai Zobon (上海中邦)

== Honours ==
League

- Chinese Yi League (tier-III)
  - Champions (1): 2004

== Results ==
- As of the end of 2012 season

All-time League Rankings

Season	2003	2004	2005	2006	2007	2008	2009	2010	2011	2012
Division	4	3	2	2	2	2	2	2	3	3
Position	4	1	9	10	8	11	9	10	5^{1}	6^{1}

- ^1 in North Group

== See also ==
- Shanghai United F.C.
