= 2011 Dalian Aerbin F.C. season =

Dalian Aerbin F.C.
- Chairman: Li Ming
- Manager: Aleksandar Stankov
- Stadium: Dalian University Stadium
- League One: 1st, promoted
- FA Cup: 2nd round
- Top goalscorer: Johnny Woodly(13 goals)

The 2011 Dalian Aerbin F.C. season is the second season in club history, and the 1st season to compete in China League One.

== Overview ==
Dalian Aerbin signed Aleksandar Stankov, their technical advisor of the previous season, as the manager, and won the league title to gain promotion to the Chinese Super League.

== Players ==
As of 12 March 2011

Note: Flags indicate national team as defined under FIFA eligibility rules; some limited exceptions apply. Players may hold more than one non-FIFA nationality.

No.	Pos.	Nation	Player
1	GK	(China) CHN	Yu Ziqian (vice captain)
2	DF	(China) CHN	Lü Zheng
3	DF	(China) CHN	Zhao Hejing
4	DF	(China) CHN	Zhang Tianxiang
5	DF	(China) CHN	Li Longri
6	MF	(China) CHN	Zhu Xiaogang
7	MF	(China) CHN	Wu Qing
8	FW	(Colombia) COL	Édison Chará
9	FW	(Costa Rica) CRC	Johnny Woodly
10	FW	(China) CHN	Guo Hui
12	MF	(China) CHN	Zhou Tong
14	MF	(China) CHN	Hu Zhaojun
15	MF	(China) CHN	Yin Lu
16	DF	(Bulgaria) BUL	Kiril Kotev
17	DF	(China) CHN	Sun Haosheng

No.	Pos.	Nation	Player
18	DF	(China) CHN	Wang Meng
19	DF	(China) CHN	Liu Tianqi
20	FW	(Guinea-Bissau) GNB	Almami Moreira
21	FW	(China) CHN	Chen Hongquan
22	GK	(China) CHN	Zhan Lunhao
23	GK	(China) CHN	Lei Tao
25	MF	(China) CHN	Quan Heng
26	FW	(Colombia) COL	Luiz Cabezas
27	DF	(China) CHN	Chang Lin (captain)
28	DF	(China) CHN	Wang Hongyou
29	MF	(China) CHN	Sun Bo
30	DF	(China) CHN	Yang Lin
33	DF	(China) CHN	Jiang Wenjun
39	MF	(China) CHN	Wang Jun

== Technical Staff ==
Position	Name
Head coach	(Bulgaria) Aleksandar Stankov
Assistant coaches	(China) Pei Yongjiu (China) Chi Shangbin
Fitness coach	Anthony
Team doctor / Physiotherapist	(China) Li Hengjun (China) Zhang Kun

== Competitions ==
=== China League One ===
==== League table ====
Pos	Team	Pld	W	D	L	GF	GA	GD	Pts	Promotion or relegation
1	Dalian Aerbin (C, P)	26	16	6	4	45	20	+25	54	Promotion to Chinese Super League
2	Guangzhou R&F (P)	26	13	8	5	36	27	+9	47	Promotion to Chinese Super League
3	Guangdong Sunray Cave	26	13	7	6	42	29	+13	46	
4	Hunan Billows	26	12	6	8	39	35	+4	42	
5	Shenyang Dongjin	26	9	10	7	32	25	+7	37	

Updated to match(es) played on 30 October 2011. Source: CSL1 Site on Sohu.com
Rules for classification: 1st points; 2nd head-to-head points; 3rd head-to-head goal difference; 4th head-to-head goals scored; 5th goal difference; 6th goals scored; 7th disciplinary points (1 point for each yellow card, 3 points for each red card).
(C) Champions; (P) Promoted

==== Matches ====
Mar 27, 2011 1	Shanghai East Asia	0–1	Dalian Aerbin	Shanghai
16:00 (UTC+08:00)			Moreira 33'	Stadium: Shanghai Stadium; Referee: Rui Tianqi

Apr 3, 2011 2	Dalian Aerbin	4–0	Wuhan Zhongbo	Dalian, Liaoning
15:00 (UTC+08:00)	Woodly 24'; Chang Lin 28'; Wang Xiaoshi 72' (o.g.); Wu Qing 72'			Stadium: Dalian University Stadium; Referee: Bai Hua

Apr 9, 2011 3	Shenyang Dongjin	0–0	Dalian Aerbin	Shenyang, Liaoning
14:30 (UTC+08:00)				Stadium: Shenyang Olympic Sports Center Stadium; Referee: Liu Yang

Apr 13, 2011 4	Dalian Aerbin	2–0	Guangdong Sunray Cave	Dalian, Liaoning
15:00 (UTC+08:00)	Woodly 21'; Zhou Tong 53'			Stadium: Dalian University Stadium; Referee: Ma Kexi

Apr 16, 2011 5	Yanbian Baekdu Tigers	0–1	Dalian Aerbin	Yanji, Jilin
14:00 (UTC+08:00)			Quan Heng 10'	Stadium: Yanji People's Stadium; Referee: Liu Xun

Apr 23, 2011 6	Dalian Aerbin	2–0	Tianjin Songjiang	Dalian, Liaoning
15:00 (UTC+08:00)	Quan Heng 32'; Woodly 77'			Stadium: Dalian University Stadium; Referee: Zhang Miao

Apr 30, 2011 7	Beijing BIT	0–3	Dalian Aerbin	Beijing
15:00 (UTC+08:00)			Woodly 18', 70'; Kotev 33'	Stadium: Beijing Institute of Technology; Referee: Rui Tianqi

May 8, 2011 8	Dalian Aerbin	1–0	Shenzhen Phoenix	Dalian, Liaoning
14:00(UTC+08:00)	Wang Hongyou 13'			Stadium: Dalian University Stadium; Referee: Shi Zhenlu

May 14, 2011 9	Guizhou Zhicheng	0–1	Dalian Aerbin	Guiyang, Guizhou
15:30 (UTC+08:00)			Quan Heng 1'	Stadium: Guiyang Olympic Sports Center; Referee: Cao Yi

May 21, 2011 10	Tianjin Runyulong	2–0	Dalian Aerbin	Tianjin
15:30 (UTC+08:00)	Li Xingcan 11'; José Duarte 90'			Stadium: Minyuan Stadium; Referee: Wu Bo

May 28, 2011 11	Dalian Aerbin	0–1	Chongqing Lifan	Dalian, Liaoning
15:00 (UTC+08:00)			Želimir Terkeš 83'	Stadium: Dalian University Stadium; Referee: Gu Chunhan

Jun 5, 2011 12	Hunan Billows	1–1	Dalian Aerbin	Changsha, Hunan
16:00 (UTC+08:00)	Mitchel Brown 31'		Chara 7'	Stadium: Central South University of Forestry and Technology

Jun 11, 2011 13	Dalian Aerbin	2–1	Beijing Baxy	Dalian, Liaoning
15:00 (UTC+08:00)	Quan Heng 45'; Guo Hui 51'		Liu Xiang 23'	Stadium: Dalian University Stadium; Referee: Li Pan

Jun 25, 2011 14	Dalian Aerbin	2–1	Shanghai East Asia	Dalian, Liaoning
16:00 (UTC+08:00)	Woodly 66'; Guo Hui 69'		Romuald Boco 5'	Stadium: Dalian University Stadium; Referee: Shi Xiang

Jul 2, 2011 15	Wuhan Zhongbo	1–2	Dalian Aerbin	Wuhan, Hubei
19:30 (UTC+08:00)	Zhou Yi 54'		Woodly 8', 26'	Attendance: Xinhua Road Sports Center; Referee: Zhang Yue

Jul 9, 2011 16	Dalian Aerbin	2–1	Shenyang Dongjin	Dalian, Liaoning
16:00 (UTC+08:00)	Moreira 21', 89'		Liu Yi 16'	Stadium: Dalian University Stadium; Referee: Bai Hua

Jul 30, 2011 17	Guangdong Sunray Cave	1–1	Dalian Aerbin	Guangzhou, Guangdong
19:30 (UTC+08:00)	Ricardo Steer 32'		Cabezas 60'	Stadium: Guangdong Provincial People's Stadium; Referee: Bao Lei

Aug 7, 2011 18	Dalian Aerbin	3–1	Yanbian Baekdu Tigers	Dalian, Liaoning
16:00 (UTC+08:00)	Woodly 23'; Hu Zhaojun 39'; Moreira 87'		Jin Jingdao 29'	Stadium: Dalian University Stadium; Referee: Li Haihe

Aug 14, 2011 19	Tianjin Songjiang	2–1	Dalian Aerbin	Tianjin
19:45 (UTC+08:00)	Xue Chen 38'; Wang Qiang 89'		Cabezas 20'	Stadium: Tianjin Olympic Center; Referee: Chen Gang

Aug 20, 2011 20	Dalian Aerbin	2–0	Beijing BIT	Dalian, Liaoning
16:00 (UTC+08:00)	Yin Lu 16'; Hu Zhaojun 49'			Stadium: Dalian University Stadium; Referee: RuiTianqi

Aug 28, 2011 21	Guangzhou R&F	1–1	Dalian Aerbin	Guangzhou, Guangdong
19:30 (UTC+08:00)	Wen Chao 71'		Wu Qing 84'	Stadium: Yuexiushan Stadium; Referee: Liu Xun

Sep 11, 2011 22	Dalian Aerbin	1–1	Guizhou Zhicheng	Dalian, Liaoning
16:00 (UTC+08:00)	Woodly 71'		Wang Lichun 66'	Stadium: Dalian University Stadium; Referee: Shi Xiang

Sep 25, 2011 23	Dalian Aerbin	2–2	Shenyang Shenbei	Dalian, Liaoning
14:30 (UTC+08:00)	Woodly 66'; Yang Lin 88'		José Duarte 75', 86'	Stadium: Dalian University Stadium; Referee: Xia Jun

Oct 15, 2011 24	Chongqing Lifan	1–4	Dalian Aerbin	Chongqing
15:30 (UTC+08:00)	Johnson Macaba 71'		Woodly 8', 57'; Hu Zhaojun 45'; Wu Qing 62'	Stadium: Fuling Stadium; Referee: Zhang Miao

Oct 22, 2011 25	Dalian Aerbin	6–2	Hunan Billows	Dalian, Liaoning
14:30 (UTC+08:00)	Cabezas 23', 49', 65', 73'; Guo Hui 36'; Wang Jun 90'		Wang Chen 64'; William 78'	Stadium: Dalian University Stadium; Referee: Bai Hua

Oct 30, 2011 26	Beijing Baxy	1–0	Dalian Aerbin	Beijing
14:30 (UTC+08:00)	Dong Yang 16'			Stadium: Chaoyang Sports Centre; Referee: Gu Chunhan

=== Chinese FA Cup ===
4 May 2011 1	Shenzhen	0 – 3	Dalian Aerbin	Huizhou
19:30 CST			Woodly 8' 25'; Sun Bo 82'	Stadium: Huizhou Olympic Stadium

11 May 2011 2	Nanchang Hengyuan	2 – 0	Dalian Aerbin	Nanchang
15:30 CST	Yang Chen 30'; Jiang Zhipeng 62'			Stadium: Nanchang Bayi Stadium
