= 2012 China League One =

China League One
- Season: 2012
- Champions: Shanghai East Asia
- Promoted: Shanghai East Asia; Wuhan Zall
- Relegated: Beijing Baxy; Hohhot Dongjin
- Matches: 240
- Goals: 617 (2.57 per match)
- Top goalscorer: (Senegal) Babacar Gueye (23 Goals)
- Biggest home win: Harbin Songbei Yiteng 4–0 Beijing Baxy (May 26th, 2012); Hohhot Dongjin 4–0 Guangdong Sunray Cave (Jul. 21st, 2012); Harbin Songbei Yiteng 5–1 Beijing BIT (Jul. 28th, 2012); Yanbian Changbai Tiger 4–0 Hohhot Dongjin (Aug. 18th, 2012); Shenzhen Ruby 4–0 Yanbian Changbai Tiger (Oct. 20th, 2012); Chongqing F.C. 4–0 Chengdu Blades (Oct. 28th, 2012) (4 goals)
- Biggest away win: Guangdong Sunray Cave 1–5 Fujian Smart Hero (Aug. 25th, 2012); Yanbian Changbai Tiger 1–5 Harbin Yiteng (Sept. 1st, 2012); Beijing BIT 0–4 Beijing Baxy (Oct. 6th, 2012) (4 goals)
- Highest scoring: Shenzhen Ruby 5–3 Chongqing Lifan (Sept. 22nd, 2012) (8 goals)
- Longest winning run: Shanghai East Asia (6 matches)
- Longest unbeaten run: Chongqing Lifan (8 matches)
- Longest winless run: Hohhot Dongjin (11 matches)
- Longest losing run: Hunan Billows (8 matches)
- Highest attendance: 22,316; Hunan Billows 2–1 Shanghai East Asia (Aug. 4th, 2012)
- Lowest attendance: 321; Beijing Baxy 0–3 Hunan Billows (Jul. 28th, 2012)
- Average attendance: 3,996

The 2012 China League One was the ninth season of the China League One, the second tier of the Chinese football league pyramid, since its establishment. It began on March 17, 2012 and ended on October 28, 2012. The size of the league has been expanded from 14 to 16 teams this season.

== Team changes ==
=== Promotion and relegation ===
Dalian Aerbin as the champion of 2011 season and Guangzhou R&F as runner-up had promoted to the 2012 Chinese Super League. They were replaced by Chengdu Blades and Shenzhen Ruby, who had relegated from the 2011 Chinese Super League after finishing the season in the bottom two places of the table.

Guizhou Zhicheng had relegated to the 2012 China League Two after finishing the 2011 season in last place and lost play-off match against 2011 China League Two 3rd-placed team Fujian Smart Hero. Due to the league's expansion, three teams were admitted into the 2012 China League One. These were the two 2011 League Two promotion final winners, Harbin Songbei Yiteng, Chongqing F.C., and the play-off winner, Fujian Smart Hero.

=== Name changes ===
Shenyang Dongjin moved to the city of Hohhot and changed their name to Hohhot Dongjin in February 2012.

== Clubs ==
=== Stadiums and Locations ===
Location of teams in 2012 China League One

Club	Head coach	City	Stadium	Capacity	2011 season
Beijing BIT	(China) Bian Lijun	Beijing	BIT Eastern Athletic Field	5,000	13th
Beijing Baxy	(China) Cao Xiandong (China) Wang Tao	Beijing	Shijingshan Stadium	20,000	11th
Chengdu Tiancheng ^{R}	(China) Wang Baoshan	Chengdu (playing in Shuangliu)	Shuangliu Sports Centre	26,000	CSL, 15th
Chongqing F.C. ^{P}	(China) Zhao Changhong	Chongqing	Chongqing Olympic Sports Center	58,680	CL2, 2nd
Chongqing Lifan	(China) Tang Yaodong	Chongqing	Fuling Stadium	22,000	8th
Fujian Smart Hero ^{P}	(China) Xu Hui	Xiamen (playing in Fuzhou and Jinjiang)	Fuzhou Stadium; Jinjiang Sports Center Stadium (after Round 27)	23,000; 15,000	CL2, 3rd
Guangdong Sunray Cave	(Brazil) José Ricardo Rambo	Guangzhou	Guangdong Provincial People's Stadium; Guangdong Olympic Stadium (Round 29 & 30)	25,000; 80,012	3rd
Harbin Songbei Yiteng ^{P}	(China) Duan Xin	Harbin	Harbin International Conference Exhibition and Sports Center; Harbin Institute of Technology Stadium (Round 21)	50,000; 20,000	CL2, 1st
Hohhot Dongjin	(China) Yang Yumin (caretaker)	Hohhot	Hohhot City Stadium	60,000	5th
Hunan Billows	(China) Zhang Xu	Changsha	CSUFT East-Garden Stadium; Yiyang Olympic Sports Park Stadium (after Round 19)	18,000; 30,000	4th
Shanghai East Asia	(China) Jiang Bingyao	Shanghai	Shanghai Stadium; Jinshan Football Stadium (Round 26)	65,000; 30,000	9th
Shenyang Shenbei	(China) Liu Zhicai	Shenyang	Shenyang Sport University Stadium	12,000	6th
Shenzhen Ruby ^{R}	(France) Philippe Troussier	Shenzhen	Bao'an Stadium	40,000	CSL, 16th
Tianjin Songjiang	(China) Hao Haitao	Tianjin	Tianjin Tuanbo Football Stadium	30,320	12th
Wuhan Zall	(China) Zheng Xiong	Wuhan	Xinhua Road Sports Center	32,137	7th
Yanbian Changbai Tiger	(South Korea) Cho Keung-yeon	Yanji (playing in Longjing)	Hailanjiang Stadium	32,000	10th

=== Managerial changes ===
Team	Outgoing manager	Manner of departure	Date of vacancy	Table	Incoming manager	Date of appointment
Hohhot Dongjin	(China) Chen Bo (caretaker)	---	Pre-season	N/A	(China) Chen Bo	Pre-season
Chongqing Lifan	(China) Liu Jingbiao	Sacked	Pre-season	N/A	(Scotland) Lawrie McKinna	Pre-season
Shenyang Shenbei	(China) Liu Zhicai	Sacked	Pre-season	N/A	(Netherlands) Arie Haan	Pre-season
Guangdong Sunray Cave	(China) Cao Yang	Sacked	Pre-season	N/A	(Serbia) Dragan Kokotović	Pre-season
Beijing Baxy	(China) Cao Xiandong	Resigned	Pre-season	N/A	(China) Cui Enlang	Pre-season
Guangdong Sunray Cave	(Serbia) Dragan Kokotović	Sacked	27 March 2012	6th	(China) Cao Yang (caretaker)	27 March 2012
Chongqing Lifan	(Scotland) Lawrie McKinna	Sacked	14 April 2012	16th	(China) Tang Yaodong	19 April 2012
Wuhan Zall	(Brazil) Jose Carlos de Oliveira	Sacked	24 April 2012	8th	(China) Zheng Xiong (caretaker)	24 April 2012
Shenyang Shenbei	(Netherlands) Arie Haan	Resigned	1 May 2012	14th	(China) Li Zheng (caretaker)	1 May 2012
Yanbian Changbai Tiger	(China) Zheng Xianglong	Sacked	20 May 2012	14th	(China) Jin Guangzhu (caretaker)	20 May 2012
Hohhot Dongjin	(China) Chen Bo	Sacked	22 May 2012	16th	(China) Yang Yumin (caretaker)	22 May 2012
Yanbian Changbai Tiger	(China) Jin Guangzhu (caretaker)	---	1 June 2012	13th	(South Korea) Cho Keung-yeon	1 June 2012
Wuhan Zall	(China) Zheng Xiong (caretaker)	---	14 June 2012	4th	(China) Zheng Xiong	14 June 2012
Shenyang Shenbei	(China) Li Zheng (caretaker)	Resigned	18 June 2012	16th	(China) Huang Yong (caretaker)	18 June 2012
Beijing Baxy	(China) Cui Enlang	Sacked	3 July 2012	14th	(China) Gai Zengjun (caretaker)	3 July 2012
Chongqing F.C.	(China) Zhao Faqing	Resigned	5 July 2012	11th	(China) Zhao Changhong	5 July 2012
Shenyang Shenbei	(China) Huang Yong (caretaker)	Resigned	10 July 2012	15th	(China) Liu Zhicai	10 July 2012
Chengdu Tiancheng	(China) Niu Hongli	Resigned	24 July 2012	12th	(China) Wang Baoshan	24 July 2012
Guangdong Sunray Cave	(China) Cao Yang (caretaker)	Resigned	28 July 2012	12th	(Brazil) José Ricardo Rambo	29 July 2012
Beijing Baxy	(China) Gai Zengjun (caretaker)	Resigned	3 August 2012	16th	(China) Cao Xiandong (China) Wang Tao	3 August 2012
Guangdong Sunray Cave	(Brazil) José Ricardo Rambo	As assistant coach	30 August 2012	12th	(China) Cao Yang (caretaker)	30 August 2012

=== Foreign players ===
Restricting the number of foreign players strictly to four per CL1 team. A team could use three foreign players on the field each game. Players came from Hong Kong, Macau and Chinese Taipei were deemed as native players in CSL.

- Foreign players who left their clubs after first half of the season.

Club	Player 1	Player 2	Player 3	Player 4	Former Players*
Beijing BIT	(South Korea) Lee In-shik	(Uruguay) Matías Alonso	(Uruguay) Walter Guglielmone	(Uruguay) Martín Rodríguez	(Cameroon) Vicent Rodrigue
Beijing Baxy	(Brazil) Júnior Paulista	(Ghana) Daniel Quaye	(Senegal) Momar N'Diaye	(South Korea) Shin Eun-seok	(Croatia) Saša Mus
Chengdu Tiancheng	(Angola) Johnson Macaba	(Brazil) João Paulo	(Brazil) Valdo	(Brazil) William	(Brazil) Ygor de Souza
Chongqing F.C.	(Colombia) Rafael Pérez	(Honduras) Walter Julián Martínez	(New Zealand) Chris Killen		
Chongqing Lifan	(Australia) Brendon Šantalab	(Brazil) Guto	(Brazil) Nei	(Paraguay) Nelson Cabrera	
Fujian Smart Hero	(Costa Rica) Johnny Woodly	(Montenegro) Vlado Jeknić	(Netherlands) Sylvano Comvalius	(South Korea) Park Jung-soo	
Guangdong Sunray Cave	(Brazil) Dori	(Brazil) Jean Narde	(Brazil) Reinaldo	(Cameroon) Mahama Awal	(Croatia) Josip Milardović
Harbin Songbei Yiteng	(Australia) Million Butshiire	(Australia) Adam Hughes	(Brazil) Rodrigo	(Colombia) Ricardo Steer	(Ukraine) Oleksandr Krutskevich
Hohhot Dongjin	(Argentina) Luciano Olguín	(Colombia) Yovanny Arrechea	(South Korea) Lee Kil-hoon	(South Korea) Song Tae-lim	
Hunan Billows	(Honduras) Astor Henríquez	(Honduras) Emil Martínez	(Honduras) Erick Norales	(Uruguay) Claudio Cardozo	
Shanghai East Asia	(Brazil) Bruno Camacho	(Colombia) Luis Carlos Cabezas	(Ghana) Ransford Addo	(Honduras) Samir Arzú	(Cameroon) Didier Njewel
Shenyang Shenbei	(Brazil) José Duarte	(Croatia) Dario Dabac	(Montenegro) Vladimir Vujović		(Morocco) Mustapha Allaoui
Shenzhen Ruby	(Argentina) Leandro Guaita	(France) Benjamin Gavanon	(Japan) Takashi Rakuyama	(Senegal) Babacar Gueye	(Honduras) Rony Flores
Tianjin Songjiang	(Brazil) Anderson	(Estonia) Taavi Rähn	(Slovenia) Aleksander Rodić	(South Korea) Lee Se-in	
Wuhan Zall	(Brazil) Adiel	(Brazil) Vicente	(Colombia) Carlos Ceballos	(Uruguay) Julio Gutiérrez	(Colombia) César Valoyes
Yanbian Changbai Tiger	(Bosnia and Herzegovina) Ivan Božić	(Croatia) Stipe Lapić	(Mali) Soumaila Coulibaly	(South Korea) Hong Jin-sub	(Brazil) Ronaille Calheira

Hong Kong/Macau/Taiwan players (doesn't count on the foreign player slot)

Club	Player 1	Player 2
Beijing Baxy	(Chinese Taipei) Chen Hao-wei	
Guangdong Sunray Cave	(Hong Kong) Chan Siu Ki	(Hong Kong) Leung Chun Pong
Shenzhen Ruby	(Chinese Taipei) Chen Po-liang	

== League table ==
Pos	Team	Pld	W	D	L	GF	GA	GD	Pts	Promotion or relegation
1	Shanghai East Asia (P, C)	30	17	8	5	47	25	+22	59	Promotion to Chinese Super League
2	Wuhan Zall (P)	30	16	6	8	40	29	+11	54	Promotion to Chinese Super League
3	Fujian Smart Hero	30	12	10	8	41	32	+9	46	
4	Harbin Songbei Yiteng	30	13	6	11	53	43	+10	45 (Note: Harbin Songbei Yiteng 10 pts; Chongqing Lifan 3 pts; Tianjin Songjiang 2 pts)	
5	Chongqing Lifan	30	12	9	9	50	45	+5	45	
6	Tianjin Songjiang	30	12	9	9	27	24	+3	45	
7	Shenzhen Ruby	30	12	6	12	46	41	+5	42	
8	Chongqing F.C.	30	11	8	11	40	37	+3	41 (Note: Chongqing F.C. 4–0 Chengdu Tiancheng; Chengdu Tiancheng 2–1 Chongqing F.C.)	
9	Chengdu Tiancheng	30	11	8	11	33	40	−7	41	
10	Guangdong Sunray Cave	30	10	8	12	41	46	−5	38 (Note: Guangdong Sunray Cave 7 pts, GD: +3; Hunan Billows 7 pts, GD: 0; Shenyang Shenbei 2 pts)	
11	Hunan Billows	30	10	8	12	33	37	−4	38	
12	Shenyang Shenbei	30	9	11	10	36	38	−2	38	
13	Yanbian Changbai Tiger	30	10	4	16	39	51	−12	34	
14	Beijing BIT	30	8	8	14	27	41	−14	32	
15	Beijing Baxy	30	8	7	15	34	46	−12	31	
16	Hohhot Dongjin (R)	30	5	12	13	30	42	−12	27	Relegation to China League Two

Updated to match(es) played on October 28, 2012. Source: CL1 website on sohu.com (in Chinese)
Rules for classification: 1) points; 2) goal difference; 3) number of goals scored; 4) head-to-head goals scored; 5) goal difference; 6) goals scored; 7) disciplinary points (1 point for each yellow card, 3 points for each red card). Head-to-Head: Only used at the end of the season when two or more teams need the head-to-head rules to break a tie.
(C) Champions; (P) Promoted; (R) Relegated

== Positions by round ==
Team ╲ Round	1	2	3	4	5	6	7	8	9	10	11	12	13	14	15	16	17	18	19	20	21	22	23	24	25	26	27	28	29	30
Shanghai East Asia	1	2	3	1	1	1	1	1	1	1	1	1	1	1	1	1	1	1	1	1	1	1	1	1	1	1	1	1	1	1
Wuhan Zall	9	11	10	10	8	8	6	4	2	2	4	4	4	4	4	4	4	2	3	5	4	5	5	2	2	2	2	2	2	2
Fujian Smart Hero	7	5	9	9	6	7	7	6	8	9	12	12	12	12	12	10	10	9	9	11	10	10	8	7	7	6	6	4	5	3
Harbin Songbei Yiteng	9	11	12	12	10	10	9	11	10	10	8	10	7	6	5	6	6	7	6	6	6	6	6	6	4	5	5	3	4	4
Chongqing Lifan	15	14	16	15	16	16	14	15	14	12	10	8	6	7	6	5	5	5	5	3	5	4	2	3	3	3	3	5	3	5
Tianjin Songjiang	11	10	7	8	11	11	10	8	3	3	2	2	3	3	3	3	2	3	4	4	3	2	4	5	6	4	4	6	6	6
Shenzhen Ruby	3	8	11	7	4	3	4	3	6	6	7	5	5	5	7	7	8	6	8	7	7	7	7	8	10	9	9	10	8	7
Chongqing F.C.	15	9	4	6	5	6	8	7	7	7	6	7	8	9	11	8	7	8	7	8	8	9	10	10	9	10	10	9	9	8
Chengdu Tiancheng	3	3	2	3	2	2	3	5	5	5	5	6	9	10	8	9	9	11	10	10	9	11	9	9	8	8	7	7	7	9
Guangdong Sunray Cave	3	6	5	4	7	4	5	9	11	11	9	9	11	8	9	11	12	12	12	9	12	12	12	13	13	13	13	12	11	10
Hunan Billows	3	1	1	2	3	5	2	2	4	4	3	3	2	2	2	2	3	4	2	2	2	3	3	4	5	7	8	8	10	11
Shenyang Shenbei	11	16	12	13	14	14	15	14	15	13	14	15	16	15	15	15	15	14	14	13	14	13	15	14	14	14	14	13	12	12
Yanbian Changbai Tiger	7	14	15	16	13	13	12	12	12	14	13	13	13	13	13	13	11	10	11	12	11	8	11	11	12	11	12	11	13	13
Beijing BIT	1	4	8	11	12	12	11	10	9	8	11	11	10	11	10	12	13	13	13	14	15	14	14	12	11	12	11	14	14	14
Beijing Baxy	11	6	5	4	9	9	13	13	13	15	15	14	14	14	14	14	14	16	16	15	16	16	16	16	16	16	16	15	15	15
Hohhot Dongjin	11	11	12	13	15	15	16	16	16	16	16	16	15	16	16	16	16	15	15	16	13	15	13	15	15	15	15	16	16	16

Winner; promote to Chinese Super League
Runner-up; promote to Chinese Super League
Relegate to China League Two

Updated to match(es) played on Oct. 28, 2012. Source: Table by round (in Chinese)

== Top scorers ==
Rank	Player	Club	Goals
1	(Senegal) Babacar Gueye	Shenzhen Ruby	23
2	(Costa Rica) Johnny Woodly	Fujian Smart Hero	21
3	(China) Wu Lei	Shanghai East Asia	17
4	(New Zealand) Chris Killen	Chongqing F.C.	16
5	(Australia) Brendon Šantalab	Chongqing Lifan	14
5	(Brazil) Guto	Chongqing Lifan	14
5	(Brazil) José Duarte	Shenyang Shenbei	14
8	(Brazil) Vicente	Wuhan Zall	11
9	(Colombia) Ricardo Steer	Harbin Songbei Yiteng	10
9	(China) Bu Xin	Harbin Songbei Yiteng	10

== League attendance ==
Pos	Team	Total	High	Low	Average	Change
1	Hohhot Dongjin	134,664	21,817	4,926	8,978	n/a
2	Hunan Billows	104,554	22,316	1,510	6,970	n/a
3	Wuhan Zall	100,522	12,987	3,153	6,701	n/a
4	Shenzhen Ruby	96,721	9,574	3,275	6,448	n/a
5	Yanbian Changbai Tiger	80,579	10,111	2,162	5,372	n/a
6	Chongqing F.C.	70,177	16,158	1,980	4,678	n/a
7	Fujian Smart Hero	62,136	8,321	866	4,142	n/a
8	Chongqing Lifan	60,650	11,550	1,051	4,043	n/a
9	Harbin Songbei Yiteng	60,037	5,103	1,180	4,002	n/a
10	Shanghai East Asia	46,702	7,177	1,211	3,113	n/a
11	Tianjin Songjiang	44,969	5,500	1,028	2,998	n/a
12	Chengdu Tiancheng	30,391	5,052	820	2,026	n/a
13	Beijing BIT	22,362	2,326	500	1,491	n/a
14	Guangdong Sunray Cave	16,556	2,012	353	1,104	n/a
15	Shenyang Shenbei	15,267	5,000	350	1,018	n/a
16	Beijing Baxy	12,668	3,269	321	845	n/a
	League total	958,955	22,316	321	3,996	n/a

Updated to games played on Oct. 28th, 2012
Source: Chinese Football Data (in Chinese)
