= 2004–05 FC Metz season =

Metz
2004–05 season
- President: Carlo Molinari
- Head coach: Jean Fernandez
- Stadium: Stade Saint-Symphorien
- Ligue 1: 16th
- Coupe de France: Round of 32
- Coupe de la Ligue: Round of 32
- Top goalscorer: League: Hervé Tum (9); All: Hervé Tum (9)
- Average home league attendance: 18,205

The 2004–05 season was the 73rd season in the existence of FC Metz and the club's second consecutive season in the top flight of French football. In addition to the domestic league, Metz participated in this season's edition of the Coupe de France and the Coupe de la Ligue.

== Players ==
Squad at end of season

Note: Flags indicate national team as defined under FIFA eligibility rules; some limited exceptions apply. Players may hold more than one non-FIFA nationality.

No.	Pos.	Nation	Player
1	GK	FRA	Grégory Wimbée
2	DF	FRA	Franck Béria
3	DF	FRA	Franck Signorino
5	DF	ALG	Mehdi Méniri
5	DF	FRA	Stéphane Borbiconi
6	DF	FRA	Bruno Pompiére
7	DF	SCG	Ivan Gvozdenović (on loan from Club Brugge)
8	DF	FRA	Samuel Allegro
9	FW	CMR	Hervé Tum
11	MF	FRA	Christophe Avezac
12	DF	FRA	Grégory Proment
13	MF	FRA	Ludovic Obraniak (Note: Obraniak was born in Longeville-lès-Metz, France, but also qualified to represent Poland internationally and made his international debut for Poland in August 2009.)
14	FW	FRA	Richard Socrier
15	DF	SEN	Moktar Mangane
16	GK	TOG	Kossi Agassa
17	FW	RUS	Ruslan Pimenov (on loan from Lokomotiv Moscow)

No.	Pos.	Nation	Player
19	FW	NGA	Bartholomew Ogbeche (on loan from Paris Saint-Germain)
20	MF	FRA	Julien Gorius
21	FW	SEN	Babacar Gueye
22	MF	FRA	Grégory Leca
23	MF	SEN	Dino Djiba
24	MF	CIV	Venn Touré
25	FW	SEN	Momar N'Diaye
26	MF	NGA	Sébastien Renouard
27	MF	FRA	Mathieu Dinet
28	MF	FRA	Benjamin Nicaise
29	DF	FRA	Jean-Philippe Caillet
30	GK	FRA	Guillaume Cherreau
32	DF	ALG	Hemza Mihoubi
33	FW	FRA	Roy Contout
35	GK	CMR	Joslain Mayebi

=== Left club during season ===
Note: Flags indicate national team as defined under FIFA eligibility rules; some limited exceptions apply. Players may hold more than one non-FIFA nationality.

No.	Pos.	Nation	Player
10	MF	FRA	Franck Ribéry (to Galatasaray)

== Pre-season and friendlies ==
Win Draw Loss

20 July 2004 Friendly	Metz (France)	2–2	(Belgium) Standard Liège	Luxembourg City, Luxembourg
--:-- CEST (UTC+2)	N'Diaye 36'; Caillet (yellow card) 59'; Ribéry 85'		Tchité 72'; Kaklamanos 90+2'	Stadium: Stade Josy-Barthel; Attendance: 2,408; Referee: M. Wilmes

31 July 2004 Friendly	1. FC Kaiserslautern (Germany)	2–4	(France) Metz	Germany
--:-- CEST (UTC+2)				Stadium: Mulheim-Karlich Stadium

== Competitions ==
=== Overall record ===
Competition	First match	Last match	Starting round	Final position	Record							
Competition	First match	Last match	Starting round	Final position	Pld	W	D	L	GF	GA	GD	Win %
Ligue 1	7 August 2004	28 May 2005	Matchday 1	16th	38	10	14	14	33	45	−12	26.32
Coupe de France	8 January 2005	12 February 2005	Round of 64	Round of 32	2	1	0	1	2	2	+0	50.00
Coupe de la Ligue	9 November 2004		Round of 32	Round of 32	1	0	0	1	1	2	−1	0.00
Total					41	11	14	16	36	49	−13	26.83

Source: Competitions

=== Ligue 1 ===
==== League table ====
Pos	Team	Pld	W	D	L	GF	GA	GD	Pts	Qualification or relegation
14	Ajaccio	38	10	15	13	36	40	−4	45	
15	Bordeaux	38	8	20	10	37	41	−4	44	
16	Metz	38	10	14	14	33	45	−12	44	
17	Nantes	38	10	13	15	33	38	−5	43	
18	Caen (R)	38	10	12	16	36	60	−24	42	Relegation to Ligue 2

Source: Ligue 1
Rules for classification: 1) points; 2) goal difference; 3) number of goals scored.
(R) Relegated

==== Results summary ====
Overall								Home						Away					
Pld	W	D	L	GF	GA	GD	Pts	W	D	L	GF	GA	GD	W	D	L	GF	GA	GD
38	10	14	14	33	45	−12	44	7	9	3	22	15	+7	3	5	11	11	30	−19

Source: Ligue 1

==== Results by round ====
Round	1	2	3	4	5	6	7	8	9	10	11	12	13	14	15	16	17	18	19	20	21	22	23	24	25	26	27	28	29	30	31	32	33	34	35	36	37	38
Ground	H	A	H	A	H	A	H	A	H	H	A	H	A	H	A	H	A	H	A	H	A	H	A	H	A	H	A	A	H	A	H	A	H	A	H	A	H	A
Result	W	W	D	W	D	L	D	L	D	D	L	W	D	L	D	D	L	W	L	W	L	L	L	W	D	D	L	D	D	L	L	W	W	D	D	L	W	L
Position	4	2	4	1	2	6	6	9	7	10	13	8	7	8	9	10	14	13	14	13	13	13	13	12	13	12	14	14	15	15	16	15	14	13	14	15	14	16

Source: Ligue 1
A = Away; H = Home; W = Win; D = Draw; L = Loss

==== Matches ====
7 August 2004 1	Metz	1–0	Nantes	Metz
CEST (UTC+2)				Stadium: Stade Saint-Symphorien

14 August 2004 2	Ajaccio	1–2	Metz	Ajaccio
CEST (UTC+2)				Stadium: Stade François Coty

22 August 2004 3	Metz	1–1	Lyon	Metz
CEST (UTC+2)				Stadium: Stade Saint-Symphorien

28 August 2004 4	Marseille	1–3	Metz	Marseille
CEST (UTC+2)				Stadium: Stade Vélodrome

11 September 2004 5	Metz	0–0	Bordeaux	Metz
CEST (UTC+2)				Stadium: Stade Saint-Symphorien

19 September 2004 6	Auxerre	4–0	Metz	Auxerre
CEST (UTC+2)				Stadium: Stade de l'Abbé-Deschamps

22 September 2004 7	Metz	1–1	Nice	Metz
CEST (UTC+2)				Stadium: Stade Saint-Symphorien

25 September 2004 8	Lille	4–0	Metz	Villeneuve d'Ascq
CEST (UTC+2)				Stadium: Stadium Lille Métropole

3 October 2004 9	Metz	0–0	Sochaux	Metz
CEST (UTC+2)				Stadium: Stade Saint-Symphorien

16 October 2004 10	Metz	1–1	Monaco	Metz
CEST (UTC+2)				Stadium: Stade Saint-Symphorien

23 October 2004 11	Rennes	3–1	Metz	Rennes
CEST (UTC+2)				Stadium: Stade de la Route de Lorient

30 October 2004 12	Metz	2–0	Bastia	Metz
CEST (UTC+2)				Stadium: Stade Saint-Symphorien

6 November 2004 13	Toulouse	1–1	Metz	Toulouse
CEST (UTC+2)				Stadium: Stadium de Toulouse

13 November 2004 14	Metz	1–2	Caen	Metz
CEST (UTC+2)				Stadium: Stade Saint-Symphorien

20 November 2004 15	Istres	0–0	Metz	Nîmes
CEST (UTC+2)				Stadium: Stade des Costières

27 November 2004 16	Metz	2–2	Saint-Étienne	Metz
CEST (UTC+2)				Stadium: Stade Saint-Symphorien

4 December 2004 17	Lens	2–0	Metz	Lens
CEST (UTC+2)				Stadium: Stade Félix-Bollaert

11 December 2004 18	Metz	1–0	Strasbourg	Metz
CEST (UTC+2)				Stadium: Stade Saint-Symphorien

18 December 2004 19	Paris Saint-Germain	3–0	Metz	Paris
CEST (UTC+2)				Stadium: Parc des Princes

12 January 2005 20	Metz	1–0	Ajaccio	Metz
CEST (UTC+2)				Stadium: Stade Saint-Symphorien

15 January 2005 21	Lyon	2–0	Metz	Lyon
CEST (UTC+2)				Stadium: Stade de Gerland

22 January 2005 22	Metz	0–1	Marseille	Metz
CEST (UTC+2)				Stadium: Stade Saint-Symphorien

26 January 2005 23	Bordeaux	1–0	Metz	Bordeaux
CEST (UTC+2)				Stadium: Stade Chaban-Delmas

29 January 2005 24	Metz	3–0	Auxerre	Metz
CEST (UTC+2)				Stadium: Stade Saint-Symphorien

5 February 2005 25	Nice	1–1	Metz	Nice
CEST (UTC+2)				Stadium: Stade du Ray

20 February 2005 26	Metz	1–1	Lille	Metz
CEST (UTC+2)				Stadium: Stade Saint-Symphorien

5 March 2005 28	Monaco	0–0	Metz	Monaco
CEST (UTC+2)				Stadium: Stade Louis II

12 March 2005 29	Metz	1–1	Rennes	Metz
CEST (UTC+2)				Stadium: Stade Saint-Symphorien

16 March 2005 27	Sochaux	2–1	Metz	Montbéliard
CEST (UTC+2)				Stadium: Stade Auguste Bonal

19 March 2005 30	Bastia	1–0	Metz	Furiani
CEST (UTC+2)				Stadium: Stade Armand Cesari

2 April 2005 31	Metz	0–1	Toulouse	Metz
CEST (UTC+2)				Stadium: Stade Saint-Symphorien

9 April 2005 32	Caen	0–1	Metz	Caen
CEST (UTC+2)				Stadium: Stade Michel d'Ornano

16 April 2005 33	Metz	2–1	Istres	Metz
CEST (UTC+2)				Stadium: Stade Saint-Symphorien

23 April 2005 34	Saint-Étienne	0–0	Metz	Saint-Étienne
CEST (UTC+2)				Stadium: Stade Geoffroy-Guichard

7 May 2005 35	Metz	1–1	Lens	Metz
CEST (UTC+2)				Stadium: Stade Saint-Symphorien

14 May 2005 36	Strasbourg	3–1	Metz	Strasbourg
CEST (UTC+2)				Stadium: Stade de la Meinau

21 May 2005 37	Metz	3–2	Paris Saint-Germain	Metz
CEST (UTC+2)				Stadium: Stade Saint-Symphorien

28 May 2005 38	Nantes	1–0	Metz	Nantes
CEST (UTC+2)				Stadium: Stade de la Beaujoire

=== Coupe de France ===
8 January 2005 Round of 64	Rodez	1–2	Metz	Rodez
19:30 CET (UTC+1)				Stadium: Stade Paul Lignon; Attendance: 7,500; Referee: Philippe Malige

12 February 2005 Round of 32	Metz	0–1	Sochaux	Metz
20:00 CET (UTC+1)				Stadium: Stade Saint-Symphorien; Attendance: 7,202; Referee: Laurent Duhamel

=== Coupe de la Ligue ===
9 November 2004 Round of 32	Metz	1–2	Bastia	Metz
21:00 CET (UTC+1)				Stadium: Stade Saint-Symphorien; Attendance: 9,668; Referee: Damien Ledentu

== Statistics ==
=== Goalscorers ===
Rank	No.	Pos	Nat	Name	Ligue 1	Coupe de France	Coupe de la Ligue	Total
1	9	FW	(Cameroon)	Hervé Tum	9	0	0	9
2	12	MF	(France)	Grégory Proment	4	1	0	5
3	21	FW	(Senegal)	Babacar Gueye	3	0	1	4
3	5	DF	(France)	Stéphane Borbiconi	3	1	0	4
Totals					33	2	1	36
