= 2011 China League One =

China League One
- Season: 2011
- Champions: Dalian Aerbin
- Promoted: Dalian Aerbin; Guangzhou R&F
- Relegated: Guizhou Zhicheng (via relegation play-off)
- Matches: 182
- Goals: 411 (2.26 per match)
- Top goalscorer: (Costa Rica) Johnny Woodly (Dalian Aerbin) (Honduras) Mitchel Brown (Hunan Billows) (13 goals)
- Biggest home win: Dalian 4–0 Hubei (3 April); Hubei 4–0 Beijing (16 April); Hunan 4–0 Shenzhen (21 May); Shanghai 4–0 Yanbian (11 September); Dalian 6–2 Hunan (22 October)
- Biggest away win: Beijing BIT 0–3 Dalian (30 April); Beijing BIT 1–4 Shanghai (28 May); Beijing BIT 1–4 Guangdong (25 June); Tianjin R 0–3 Hunan (25 June); Guizhou 0–3 Guangdong (29 July); Chongqing 1–4 Dalian (15 October); Chongqing 0–3 Shenyang S (22 October)
- Highest scoring: Dalian 6–2 Hunan (22 October)

The 2011 China League One is the eighth season of the China League One, the second tier of the Chinese football league pyramid, since its establishment. It began on 26 March 2011 and ended in October 2011.

The size of the league expanded from 13 to 14 teams for this season.

== Teams ==
=== Promotion and relegation ===
Guangzhou Evergrande as champions of the 2010 season and Chengdu Blades as runners-up were promoted to the 2011 Chinese Super League. They were replaced by Chongqing Lifan and Changsha Ginde (Now named Shenzhen Phoenix), who were relegated from the 2010 Chinese Super League after finishing the season in the bottom two places of the table.

Nanjing Yoyo were relegated to the 2011 China League Two after finishing the 2010 season in last place. Due to a league expansion, two teams were admitted into the 2011 League One. These were the two 2010 League Two promotion final winners, Dalian Aerbin and Tianjin Songjiang.

=== Name changes ===
Beijing Baxy&Shengshi changed their name to Beijing Baxy. Hubei Luyin changed their name to Hubei Wuhan Zhongbo. Yanbian F.C. changed their name to Yanbian Changbai Tiger. In other team changes, League Two club Guizhou Zhicheng merged with Shanghai Zobon, acquiring Pudong's League One license in the process. Furthermore, minor-league club Tianjin Runyulong purchased Anhui Jiufang and their League One license in a similar merger. Both Guizhou Zhicheng and Tianjin Runyulong will make their debut at the second level of Chinese football. Changsha Ginde was purchased by MAZAMBA and moved to the city of Shenzhen, and the name was changed to Shenzhen Phoenix. At June 2011, Shenzhen Phoenix was purchased by Guangzhou R&F Properties Co. Ltd. again, the club's name changed to Guangzhou R&F F.C. and moved to the city of Guangzhou. In July 2011, Tianjin Runyulong F.C. moved to the city of Shenyang and the name was changed to Shenyang Shenbei.

== Clubs ==
=== Foreign players ===
Restricting the number of foreign players strictly to four per CL1 team. A team could use three foreign players on the field each game.

- Foreign players who left their clubs after first half of the season.

Club	Player 1	Player 2	Player 3	Player 4	Former Players*
Beijing BIT	(South Korea) Chae Wan-Ji	(Uruguay) Héctor García	(Uruguay) Julio Gutiérrez	(Uruguay) Martín Rodríguez	
Beijing Baxy	(Cameroon) Paul Essola	(Montenegro) Vlado Jeknić	(Uruguay) Máximo Lucas	(Uruguay) Diego Seoane	(United States) Lyle Martin
Chongqing Lifan	(Angola) Johnson Macaba	(Bosnia and Herzegovina) Želimir Terkeš	(Croatia) Ivan Bošnjak	(Croatia) Dario Dabac	(Brazil) Rai Vilela
Dalian Aerbin	(Bulgaria) Kiril Kotev	(Colombia) Luis Cabezas	(Costa Rica) Johnny Woodly	(Guinea-Bissau) Almami Moreira	(Colombia) Édison Chará
Guangdong Sunray Cave	(Cameroon) Mahama Awal	(Colombia) Ricardo Steer	(Costa Rica) Darío Delgado	(Mali) Mourtala Diakité	(Brazil) Ronny
Guangzhou R&F	(Brazil) Harison	(England) Marlon Harewood	(Serbia) Aleksandar Živković		(Angola) Johnson Macaba (Brazil) Beto
Guizhou Zhicheng	(Brazil) Maurinho	(Cameroon) Thomas Manga	(Nigeria) Obi Moneke	(Serbia) Dragan Stančić	
Hubei Wuhan Zhongbo	(Brazil) Vicente	(Croatia) Bruno Šiklić	(Slovenia) Jože Benko		
Hunan Billows	(Brazil) Willian	(Honduras) Mario Beata	(Honduras) Mitchel Brown	(Honduras) Jerry Palacios	
Shanghai East Asia	(Benin) Romuald Boco				(Bosnia and Herzegovina) Jusuf Dajić (Brazil) Cílio Souza (North Macedonia) Nikola Karčev
Shenyang Dongjin	(Croatia) Željko Sablić	(Nigeria) Akanni-Sunday Wasiu	(Serbia) Milan Martinović	(South Korea) Lee Yoon-sub	(South Korea) Sung Jong-hyun
Shenyang Shenbei	(Brazil) José Duarte	(Brazil) Ernandes	(Colombia) Andrés Quejada		
Tianjin Songjiang	(Brazil) Júnior Paulista	(Estonia) Taavi Rähn	(Sierra Leone) Aluspah Brewah	(Slovenia) Aleksander Rodić	
Yanbian Changbai Tiger	(Ghana) Daniel Quaye	(Mali) Soumaïla Coulibaly	(South Korea) Park Jong-woo	(South Korea) Woo Joo-young	(South Korea) Lee Gwang-jae

== League table ==
Pos	Team	Pld	W	D	L	GF	GA	GD	Pts	Promotion or relegation
1	Dalian Aerbin (C, P)	26	16	6	4	45	20	+25	54	Promotion to Chinese Super League
2	Guangzhou R&F (P)	26	13	8	5	36	27	+9	47	Promotion to Chinese Super League
3	Guangdong Sunray Cave	26	13	7	6	42	29	+13	46	
4	Hunan Billows	26	12	6	8	39	35	+4	42	
5	Shenyang Dongjin	26	9	10	7	32	25	+7	37	
6	Shenyang Shenbei	26	8	10	8	31	31	0	34	
7	Hubei Wuhan Zhongbo	26	8	9	9	26	28	−2	33 (Note: Hubei, 2 pts, 1–1; Chongqing, 2 pts, 1–1)	
8	Chongqing Lifan	26	8	9	9	30	35	−5	33	
9	Shanghai East Asia	26	7	11	8	29	25	+4	32	
10	Yanbian Changbai Tiger	26	8	6	12	30	36	−6	30	
11	Beijing Baxy	26	7	9	10	18	28	−10	30	
12	Tianjin Songjiang	26	5	10	11	23	31	−8	25	
13	Beijing BIT	26	5	9	12	15	33	−18	24	
14	Guizhou Zhicheng (R)	26	4	8	14	15	28	−13	20	China League One Relegation Playoffs

Updated to match(es) played on 30 October 2011. Source: CSL1 Site on Sohu.com
Rules for classification: 1st points; 2nd head-to-head points; 3rd head-to-head goal difference; 4th head-to-head goals scored; 5th goal difference; 6th goals scored; 7th disciplinary points (1 point for each yellow card, 3 points for each red card).
(C) Champions; (P) Promoted; (R) Relegated

=== Positions by round ===
Team ╲ Round	1	2	3	4	5	6	7	8	9	10	11	12	13	14	15	16	17	18	19	20	21	22	23	24	25	26
Dalian Aerbin	1	1	1	1	1	1	1	1	1	1	1	1	1	1	1	1	1	1	1	1	1	1	1	1	1	1
Guangzhou R&F	7	10	14	11	9	7	7	7	7	7	7	3	3	3	3	3	3	3	3	3	3	3	2	2	2	2
Guangdong Sunray Cave	10	5	2	4	5	4	4	4	4	4	4	2	2	2	2	2	2	2	2	2	2	2	3	3	3	3
Hunan Billows	11	12	10	14	14	11	11	11	11	11	4	4	4	4	4	4	4	4	4	4	4	4	4	4	4	4
Shenyang Dongjin	5	9	11	6	3	5	5	5	5	5	5	8	8	8	8	8	8	8	8	8	8	8	6	7	5	5
Shenyang Shenbei	9	8	4	2	4	6	6	6	6	6	6	7	7	7	7	7	7	7	7	7	7	7	8	9	6	6
Chongqing Lifan	6	4	5	8	10	3	3	3	3	3	3	6	6	6	6	6	6	6	6	6	6	6	5	5	7	8
Shanghai East Asia	14	13	12	9	8	2	2	2	2	2	2	5	5	5	5	5	5	5	5	5	5	5	7	6	8	9
Hubei Zhongbo	13	14	13	10	7	9	9	9	9	9	9	9	9	9	9	9	9	9	9	9	9	9	9	8	9	7
Yanbian Changbai Tiger	12	11	7	3	6	13	13	13	13	13	13	12	12	12	12	12	12	12	12	12	12	12	12	10	10	10
Beijing Baxy	4	3	8	12	12	8	8	8	8	8	8	10	10	10	10	10	10	10	10	10	10	10	10	11	11	11
Tianjin Songjiang	3	6	6	7	11	12	12	12	12	12	12	11	11	11	11	11	11	11	11	11	11	11	11	12	12	12
Beijing BIT	8	7	9	13	13	14	14	14	14	14	14	14	14	14	14	14	14	14	14	14	14	14	13	13	13	13
Guizhou Zhicheng	2	2	3	5	2	10	10	10	10	10	10	13	13	13	13	13	13	13	13	13	13	13	14	14	14	14

Winner; Chinese Super League
2nd place; Chinese Super League
China League One Relegation Playoffs

Source: http://sports.sohu.com/s2004/zhongjia.shtml

== Results ==
Home \ Away	BJT	BJB	CQ	DLA	GD	GUZ	HB	HN	SHE	SY	GZR	SYN	TJS	YB
Beijing BIT		2–1	0–2	0–3	1–4	1–0	2–0	0–1	1–4	1–0	0–1	1–1	2–1	1–1
Beijing Baxy	0–0		3–2	1–0	0–0	1–0	0–0	2–3	0–2	2–1	0–2	0–2	1–1	2–2
Chongqing Lifan	1–1	1–1		1–4	1–2	1–1	0–0	3–2	1–0	1–2	0–2	0–3	2–2	2–0
Dalian Aerbin	2–0	2–1	0–1		2–0	1–1	4–0	6–2	2–1	2–1	1–0	2–2	2–0	3–1
Guangdong Sunray Cave	0–0	0–1	2–2	1–1		2–1	3–1	3–2	2–2	2–3	1–1	3–0	2–0	1–0
Guizhou Zhicheng	0–0	0–0	0–1	0–1	0–3		0–1	0–0	1–1	1–0	2–3	1–0	0–1	0–2
Hubei Wuhan Zhongbo	2–0	4–0	1–1	1–2	2–3	0–1		1–2	0–0	1–2	2–1	1–1	2–1	2–0
Hunan Billows	1–0	0–1	2–1	1–1	2–3	3–2	0–2		2–1	2–2	4–0	0–0	0–0	1–0
Shanghai East Asia	0–0	1–0	0–1	0–1	2–1	0–0	0–0	2–2		2–2	1–1	2–1	2–2	4–0
Shenyang Dongjin	2–1	2–0	0–0	0–0	3–0	1–0	0–0	3–1	1–1		0–2	1–2	1–1	0–1
Guangzhou R&F	4–1	0–0	2–2	1–1	0–2	1–0	1–1	2–0	1–0	1–1		1–1	3–2	2–1
Shenyang Shenbei	1–0	0–1	2–0	1–0	0–2	1–1	1–2	0–3	1–0	1–1	0–2		1–1	3–2
Tianjin Songjiang	0–0	0–0	2–2	2–1	0–0	1–2	0–0	0–1	2–0	0–2	1–2	1–3		1–0
Yanbian Changbai Tiger	1–1	1–0	3–2	0–1	2–0	2–0	3–0	0–2	0–1	1–1	3–0	3–3	1–3	

Updated to match(es) played on 30 October 2011. Source: League One results
Legend: Blue = home team win; Yellow = draw; Red = away team win.

== Relegation play-off ==
2011 China League One 14th-placed Guizhou Zhicheng faces 2011 China League Two 3rd-placed team Fujian Smart Hero for a play-off match. The winner Fujian Smart Hero earn a spot in the 2012 China League One.

29 November 2011
14:30 CEST

Guizhou Zhicheng (R)	1–1 (a.e.t.)	Fujian Smart Hero (P)
Du Shaobin 88' (pen.)	Report	Li Chao 80'
Penalties
Liu Ji (penalty missed); Du Shaobin (penalty scored); Wang Lichun (penalty scored); Chen Hao (penalty scored); Jiang Liang (penalty scored)	4–5	(penalty scored) Feng Shaoshun; (penalty scored) Yu Jing; (penalty scored) Huang Shibo; (penalty scored) Yin Xiaolong; (penalty scored) Wang Guoming

Yingtan Stadium, Yingtan

== Top scorers ==
Updated to games played on 30 October 2011.

Rank	Player	Club	Goals (P.K.)
1	(Costa Rica) Johnny Woodly	Dalian Aerbin	13 (2)
1	(Honduras) Mitchel Brown	Hunan Billows	13
3	(China) Wu Lei	Shanghai East Asia	12 (1)
4	(Brazil) José Duarte	Shenyang Shenbei	11 (1)
4	(China) Yin Hongbo	Guangdong Sunray Cave	11 (5)
6	(Angola) Johnson Macaba	Shenzhen Phoenix; Chongqing Lifan	9
6	(China) Li Xingcan	Shenyang Shenbei	9
6	(China) Lu Lin	Guangdong Sunray Cave	9
9	(Brazil) Vicente	Hubei Wuhan Zhongbo	8 (1)
9	(Cameroon) Mahama Awal	Guangdong Sunray Cave	8
9	(China) Zhang Shuo	Guangzhou R&F	8
9	(Colombia) Ricardo Steer	Guangdong Sunray Cave	8
9	(Slovenia) Aleksander Rodić	Tianjin Songjiang	8 (1)
