= 2017 Chinese U-18 League =

Tournament details
- Country: China
- Dates: 4 March 2017–12 March 2017 (Phase 1); 4 June 2017–12 June 2017 (Phase 2)

Final positions
- Champions: Shandong Luneng Taishan U-18 B Team
- Runners-up: Guangzhou Evergrande Taobao U-18 B Team

The 2017 Chinese U-18 League (Chinese: 2017全国青少年男子足球U18联赛) is an association football league season that started on 4 March 2017 and ended on 12 June 2017.

== Phase 1 ==
2017 Chinese U-18 League Phase 1 started on 4 March 2017 with 17 teams participating in this phase.

=== Group A ===
| Team | Pld | W | D | L | GF | GA | GD | Pts | Qualification |
|---|---|---|---|---|---|---|---|---|---|
| Dalian Yifang U-18 | 4 | 4 | 0 | 0 | 7 | 3 | +4 | 12 | Division A |
| Guangzhou Evergrande Taobao U-18 A Team | 4 | 1 | 1 | 2 | 5 | 5 | 0 | 4 | Division A |
| Chongqing Dangdai Lifan U-18 | 4 | 1 | 1 | 2 | 5 | 5 | 0 | 4 | Division A |
| Yanbian Funde U-18 | 4 | 1 | 1 | 2 | 3 | 4 | -1 | 4 | Division B |
| Beijing Enterprises Group U-18 | 4 | 1 | 1 | 2 | 3 | 6 | -3 | 4 | Division B |

=== Group B ===
| Team | Pld | W | D | L | GF | GA | GD | Pts | Qualification |
|---|---|---|---|---|---|---|---|---|---|
| Hebei China Fortune U-18 | 5 | 4 | 0 | 2 | 6 | 2 | +4 | 12 | Division A |
| Beijing Sinobo Guoan U-18 | 5 | 2 | 2 | 1 | 4 | 7 | -3 | 8 | Division A |
| Guangzhou Evergrande Taobao U-18 B Team | 5 | 2 | 1 | 2 | 5 | 5 | 0 | 7 | Division A |
| Lijiang Yuanheng U-18 | 5 | 2 | 1 | 2 | 7 | 8 | -1 | 7 | Division B |
| Shandong Luneng Taishan U-18 A Team | 5 | 1 | 1 | 3 | 2 | 3 | -1 | 4 | Division B |
| Tianjin FA U-18 | 5 | 1 | 1 | 3 | 7 | 6 | +1 | 4 | Division B |

=== Group C ===
| Team | Pld | W | D | L | GF | GA | GD | Pts | Qualification |
|---|---|---|---|---|---|---|---|---|---|
| Shandong Luneng Taishan U-18 B Team | 5 | 5 | 0 | 0 | 20 | 1 | +19 | 15 | Division A |
| Shenzhen F.C. U-18 | 5 | 3 | 1 | 1 | 10 | 4 | +6 | 10 | Division A |
| Guangxi Beihai No.9 High School U-18 | 5 | 2 | 1 | 2 | 8 | 11 | -3 | 7 | Division A |
| Guangzhou Evergrande Football School U-18 | 5 | 2 | 1 | 2 | 6 | 7 | -1 | 7 | Division B |
| Nei Mongol Horinger U-18 | 5 | 1 | 1 | 3 | 7 | 14 | -7 | 4 | Division B |
| Shanghai Shenxin U-18 | 5 | 0 | 0 | 5 | 5 | 19 | -14 | 0 | Division B |

== Phase 2 ==
2017 Chinese U-18 League Phase 2 started on 4 June 2017. Guangxi Beihai No.9 High School U-18 and Lijiang Yuanheng U-18 decided not to participate in this phase. Qingdao Jonoon U-18 joined in this phase. Dalian Yifang U-18 withdrew after the first match due to flu.

=== Division A ===
==== Group A ====
| Team | Pld | W | D | L | GF | GA | GD | Pts | Qualification |
|---|---|---|---|---|---|---|---|---|---|
| Shandong Luneng Taishan U-18 B Team | 2 | 2 | 0 | 0 | 8 | 2 | +6 | 6 | 1-4 Classification |
| Chongqing Dangdai Lifan U-18 | 2 | 1 | 0 | 1 | 1 | 4 | -3 | 3 | 1-4 Classification |
| Shenzhen F.C. U-18 | 2 | 0 | 0 | 2 | 5 | 8 | -3 | 0 | 5-8 Classification |
| Dalian Yifang U-18 | 0 | 0 | 0 | 0 | 0 | 0 | 0 | | Withdrew |

==== Group B ====
| Team | Pld | W | D | L | GF | GA | GD | Pts | Qualification |
|---|---|---|---|---|---|---|---|---|---|
| Guangzhou Evergrande Taobao U-18 B Team | 3 | 2 | 1 | 0 | 4 | 0 | +4 | 7 | 1-4 Classification |
| Beijing Sinobo Guoan U-18 | 3 | 1 | 2 | 0 | 1 | 0 | +1 | 5 | 1-4 Classification |
| Hebei China Fortune U-18 | 3 | 1 | 1 | 1 | 3 | 3 | 0 | 4 | 5-8 Classification |
| Guangzhou Evergrande Taobao U-18 A Team | 3 | 0 | 0 | 3 | 2 | 7 | -5 | 0 | 5-8 Classification |

=== Division B ===
==== Group C ====
| Team | Pld | W | D | L | GF | GA | GD | Pts | Qualification |
|---|---|---|---|---|---|---|---|---|---|
| Shanghai Shenxin U-18 | 3 | 3 | 0 | 0 | 7 | 1 | +6 | 9 | 9-12 Classification |
| Beijing Enterprises Group U-18 | 3 | 2 | 0 | 1 | 7 | 3 | +4 | 6 | 9-12 Classification |
| Yanbian Funde U-18 | 3 | 1 | 0 | 2 | 9 | 4 | +5 | 3 | 13-16 Classification |
| Nei Mongol Horinger U-18 | 3 | 0 | 0 | 3 | 0 | 15 | -15 | 0 | 13-16 Classification |

==== Group D ====
| Team | Pld | W | D | L | GF | GA | GD | Pts | Qualification |
|---|---|---|---|---|---|---|---|---|---|
| Shandong Luneng Taishan U-18 A Team | 3 | 3 | 0 | 0 | 10 | 1 | +9 | 9 | 9-12 Classification |
| Tianjin FA U-18 | 3 | 2 | 0 | 1 | 6 | 2 | +4 | 6 | 9-12 Classification |
| Qingdao Jonoon U-18 | 3 | 1 | 0 | 2 | 3 | 11 | -8 | 3 | 13-16 Classification |
| Guangzhou Evergrande Football School U-18 | 3 | 0 | 0 | 3 | 0 | 5 | -5 | 0 | 13-16 Classification |

=== Classification round ===
==== 1-4 Classification ====
| Team | Pld | W | D | L | GF | GA | GD | Pts |
|---|---|---|---|---|---|---|---|---|
| Shandong Luneng Taishan U-18 B Team | 3 | 2 | 1 | 0 | 6 | 1 | +5 | 7 |
| Guangzhou Evergrande Taobao U-18 B Team | 3 | 1 | 2 | 0 | 2 | 1 | +1 | 5 |
| Beijing Sinobo Guoan U-18 | 3 | 1 | 1 | 1 | 1 | 1 | 0 | 4 |
| Chongqing Dangdai Lifan U-18 | 3 | 0 | 0 | 3 | 0 | 6 | -6 | 0 |

==== 5-7 Classification ====
| Team | Pld | W | D | L | GF | GA | GD | Pts |
|---|---|---|---|---|---|---|---|---|
| Hebei China Fortune U-18 | 2 | 2 | 0 | 0 | 7 | 2 | +5 | 6 |
| Guangzhou Evergrande Taobao U-18 A Team | 2 | 1 | 0 | 1 | 4 | 3 | +1 | 3 |
| Shenzhen F.C. U-18 | 2 | 0 | 0 | 2 | 3 | 9 | -6 | 0 |

==== 8-11 Classification ====
| Team | Pld | W | D | L | GF | GA | GD | Pts |
|---|---|---|---|---|---|---|---|---|
| Shandong Luneng Taishan U-18 A Team | 3 | 2 | 1 | 0 | 9 | 6 | +3 | 7 |
| Tianjin FA U-18 | 3 | 2 | 0 | 1 | 6 | 2 | +4 | 6 |
| Shanghai Shenxin U-18 | 3 | 1 | 1 | 1 | 8 | 9 | -1 | 4 |
| Beijing Enterprises Group U-18 | 3 | 0 | 0 | 3 | 1 | 7 | -6 | 0 |

==== 12-15 Classification ====
| Team | Pld | W | D | L | GF | GA | GD | Pts |
|---|---|---|---|---|---|---|---|---|
| Qingdao Jonoon U-18 | 3 | 3 | 0 | 0 | 9 | 4 | +5 | 9 |
| Yanbian Funde U-18 | 3 | 2 | 0 | 1 | 12 | 5 | +7 | 6 |
| Guangzhou Evergrande Football School U-18 | 3 | 1 | 0 | 2 | 5 | 6 | -1 | 3 |
| Nei Mongol Horinger U-18 | 3 | 0 | 0 | 3 | 4 | 15 | -11 | 0 |
