= Diego Seoane =

Diego Seoane may refer to:

- Diego Seoane (Spanish footballer) (born 1988)
- Diego Seoane (Uruguayan footballer) (born 1976)
