= Zola Kiniambi =

Congolese footballer (born 1970)

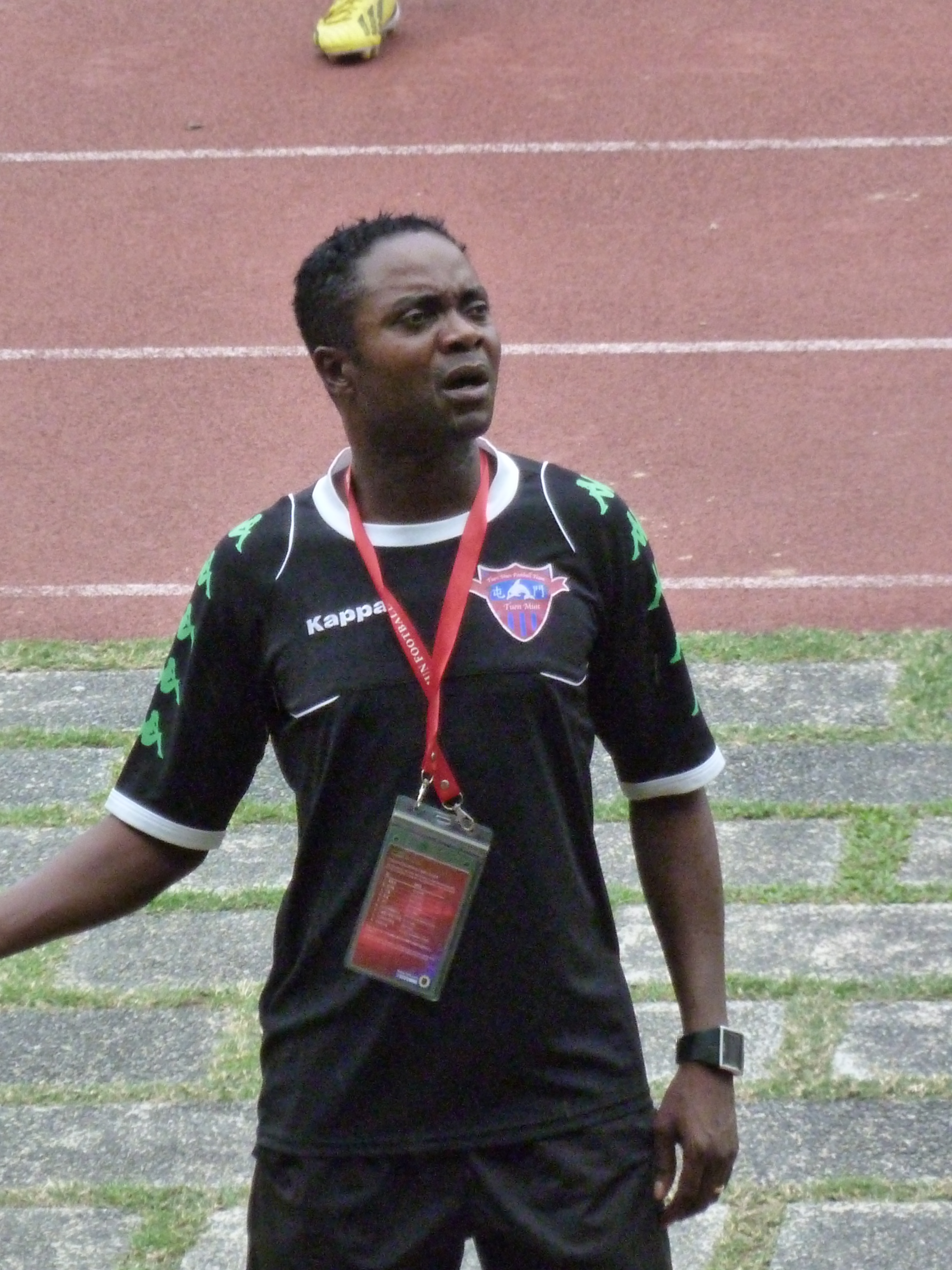
- Kiniambi as Technical director of Tuen Mun in 2013

Personal information
- Full name: Kiniambi Zola Aloyi
- Date of birth: 26 June 1970 (age 56)
- Place of birth: Kikwit, Zaire
- Height: 1.75 m (5 ft 9 in)
- Position: Midfielder

Team information
- Current team: Tuen Mun (technical director)

Senior career*
Years	Team	Apps	(Gls)
1994–1995	Vita	?	(?)
1996	Gençlerbirliği	3	(0)
1997–2000	Yanbian Aodong	65	(12)
1998	→ Tianjin Teda (loan)	16	(13)
2001–2003	Chongqing Lifan	73	(7)
2005–2006	Yanbian FC	43	(13)
2007	Chongqing Lifan	15	(1)
2008	Yanbian FC	13	(3)
Total		225	(60)

International career
1996	Zaire	2	(0)

Managerial career
- 2009–2013: Yanbian (assistant coach)
- 2013–: Tuen Mun (technical director)
- * Club domestic league appearances and goals

Zola Kiniambi Aloyi (born 26 June 1970) is a Congolese former professional footballer who played as a midfielder. He is the only foreign player who played in Chinese football league for more than 10 years.

== Club career ==
Kiniambi was born in Kikwit. He moved to China in 1997. He joined Jia A club Yanbian Aodong and scored six goals in his first season in the Chinese league.

He was loaned to Jia B club Tianjin Teda and scored 13 goals in 16 games in the 1998 season.

Chongqing Lifan sighed Kiniambi in 2001.

At the beginning of season 2005, he returned to Yanbian FC.

After he retired in 2008, he became a coach and interpreter for Yanbian FC.

The Chinese Football Association honored his outstanding 10-year service with a medal.

In the 2013–14 season, Hong Kong First Division League club Tuen Mun appointed Zola as the technical director of the club.

== International career ==
He played in the African Nations Cup 1996 as a midfielder.

== Personal life ==
Kiniambi lives in Yanbian, China and has two children, both at school.
