= Grégory Wimbée =

French footballer (born 1971)

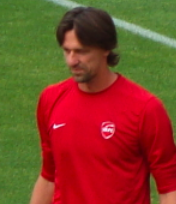
- Wimbée training with Valenciennes in 2010

Personal information
- Date of birth: 19 August 1971 (age 55)
- Place of birth: Essey-lès-Nancy, France
- Height: 1.93 m (6 ft 4 in)
- Position: Goalkeeper

Youth career
- Clairefontaine
- 1990–1992: Nancy

Senior career*
Years	Team	Apps	(Gls)
1992–1997	Nancy	118	(1)
1992–1994	→ Charleville (loan)	75	(0)
1997–1998	Cannes	11	(0)
1998–2004	Lille	196	(0)
2004–2006	Metz	67	(0)
2006–2009	Grenoble	111	(0)
2009–2011	Valenciennes	1	(0)
Total		579	(1)
- * Club domestic league appearances and goals

Grégory Wimbée (born 19 August 1971) is a French retired footballer who played as a goalkeeper.

He appeared in 282 Ligue 1 games over 11 seasons, representing in the competition Nancy, Lille, Metz, Grenoble and Valenciennes. In a 19-year professional career, he added 297 matches in Ligue 2.

== Club career ==
Wimbée was born in Essey-lès-Nancy, Meurthe-et-Moselle. After graduating from AS Nancy's youth system and serving a loan to Division 2 side OFC Charleville, he became an undisputed starter for the former, helping them achieve promotion to Division 1. On 28 November 1996, in his first top flight season, he scored a last-minute goal from a corner, in a 1–1 home draw against RC Lens, becoming the first goalkeeper to have scored in the competition's history.

After an unassuming year with AS Cannes, Wimbée moved to Lille OSC, achieving another promotion and later qualifying to the 2001–02 edition of the UEFA Champions League, the first-ever participation in the competition for the Nord-Pas de Calais club. During six seasons, he was an automatic first choice.

After two seasons and a further 67 first division matches with FC Metz, Wimbée joined Grenoble Foot 38 in 2006. He made 36 appearances in 2007–08, as the campaign again ended in promotion and the team returned to the top flight after a 45-year absence.

On 28 August 2009, the 38-year-old Wimbée signed a one-year deal with fellow league club Valenciennes FC. During the season, which ended with a tenth-place finish, he played only once, in a 1–3 home loss against FC Toulouse on 16 January 2010, renewing his contract in July for one more year.

After no additional league appearances, Wimbée retired from professional football in June 2011, two months shy of his 40th birthday.

== Career statistics ==
Appearances and goals by club, season and competition
Club	Season	League			National cup		League cup		Europe		Total	
Club	Season	Division	Apps	Goals	Apps	Goals	Apps	Goals	Apps	Goals	Apps	Goals
Nancy	1991–92	Division 1	0	0	0	0	—		—		0	0
Nancy	1994–95	Division 2	42	0	4	0	0	0	—		46	0
Nancy	1995–96	Division 2	40	0	2	0	2	0	—		44	0
Nancy	1996–97	Divisioin 1	36	1	1	0	0	0	—		37	0
Nancy	Total		118	1	7	0	2	0	—		127	1
Charleville (loan)	1992–93	Division 2	33	0	0	0	—		—		33	0
Charleville (loan)	1993–94	Division 2	42	0	3	0	—		—		45	0
Charleville (loan)	Total		75	0	3	0	—		—		78	0
Cannes	1997–98	Division 1	11	0	3	0	2	0	—		16	0
Lille	1998–99	Division 2	31	0	3	0	0	0	—		34	0
Lille	1999–2000	Division 2	35	0	1	0	1	0	—		36	0
Lille	2000–01	Division 1	32	0	1	0	0	0	—		34	0
Lille	2001–02	Division 1	31	0	0	0	0	0	12	0	43	0
Lille	2002–03	Ligue 1	32	0	1	0	3	0	6	0	42	0
Lille	2003–04	Ligue 1	35	0	1	0	0	0	—		36	0
Lille	Total		196	0	7	0	4	0	18	0	225	0
Metz	2004–05	Ligue 1	37	0	2	0	1	0	—		40	0
Metz	2005–06	Ligue 1	30	0	2	0	0	0	—		32	0
Metz	Total		67	0	4	0	1	0	—		72	0
Grenoble	2006–07	Ligue 2	38	0	3	0	1	0	—		42	0
Grenoble	2007–08	Ligue 2	36	0	0	0	1	0	—		37	0
Grenoble	2008–09	Ligue 1	37	0	0	0	0	0	—		37	0
Grenoble	Total		111	0	3	0	2	0	—		116	0
Valenciennes	2009–10	Ligue 1	1	0	0	0	0	0	—		1	0
Valenciennes	2010–11	Ligue 1	0	0	0	0	0	0	—		0	0
Valenciennes	Total		1	0	0	0	0	0	—		1	0
Career rotal			579	1	26	0	11	0	18	0	634	1
