= Gao Zhongxun =

Chinese footballer

Gao Zhongxun 高仲勋
Personal information
- Date of birth: 4 January 1965 (age 61)
- Place of birth: Yanbian, Jilin, China
- Height: 1.76 m (5 ft 9 in)
- Position: Midfielder

Senior career*
| Years | Team | Apps | (Gls) |
| 1984–1987 | Jilin team | | |
| 1988 | China B | | |
| 1989–2000 | Jilin Aodong | | |
| 2001 | Beijing Kuanli | | |

International career
| 1992–1996 | China | 12+ | (2) |

Managerial career
- 2014: Yanbian Changbaishan
Medal record
Men's football
Representing China
AFC Asian Cup
| Bronze medal – third place | 1992 Japan | Team |
Asian Games
| Silver medal – second place | 1994 Hiroshima | Football |
AFC Youth Championship
| Gold medal – first place | 1985 Abu Dhabi | Team |
Chinese name
| Simplified Chinese | 高仲勋 |
Transcriptions Standard Mandarin: Hanyu Pinyin: Gāo Zhòngxūn
Chinese Korean name
| Chosŏn'gŭl | 고종훈 |
Transcriptions: Revised Romanization: Go Jonghun; McCune–Reischauer: Ko Chonghun
- * Club domestic league appearances and goals

Gao Zhongxun (Chinese: 高仲勋; Korean: 고종훈; born 4 January 1965) is a Chinese former international football midfielder of Korean descent who spent the majority of his career with Yanbian FC as well as representing China in the 1992 Asian Cup.

== Playing career ==
Gao Zhongxun started his football career with his local football club Jilin team and was considered a promising enough youngster to be called up to the Chinese U-20 squad that took part in the 1985 FIFA World Youth Championship where he played in all four games as China were knocked-out in the quarter-finals. His time within the Chinese youth set-up would continue when in 1988 the Chinese youth team were allowed to play within the Chinese league system and throughout the 1988 campaign he played for them as the team called themselves China B. Upon his return to Jilin FC he found them relegated not to the second division but to the third tier after the Chinese Football Association restructured the league system, however by the 1990 campaign he would be part of the squad that won the division title and promotion to the second tier.

Gao's performances for Jilin would be considered impressive enough that despite playing for a second division side he would still be called up to the Chinese national team for the 1992 AFC Asian Cup and helped guide China to a third-place finish. This was followed by Jilin eventually gaining promotion back into the top tier in time for the first fully professional 1994 Chinese Jia-A League season.

== Career statistics ==
=== International statistics ===
| Year | Competition | Apps | Goal |
|---|---|---|---|
| 1992 | Asian Cup | 2 | 0 |
| 1994 | Asian Games | 6 | 2 |
| 1996 | Friendly | 2 | 0 |
| Total | | 10 | 2 |

== Honours ==
Jilin team

- Third Tier League: 1990

== Personal life ==
Gao Zhongxun's son, Gao Zhunyi, is also a footballer. He currently plays for Hebei China Fortune in the Chinese Super League.
