= Liu Zhicai =

Chinese footballer and coach

Liu Zhicai 刘志才
Personal information
- Full name: Liu Zhicai
- Date of birth: 20 October 1954 (age 72)
- Place of birth: Dalian, Liaoning, China
- Height: 1.83 m (6 ft 0 in)
- Position: Defender

Senior career*
Years	Team	Apps	(Gls)
1972	Shenyang Army		
1973–1983	Bayi Football Team		

International career
1975–1981	China	16	(0)

Managerial career
- 1996–1997: Dalian Wanda (assistant)
- 1999: Changchun Yatai (assistant)
- 2001-2002: Chongqing Lifan (assistant)
- 2002: Chongqing Lifan (interim)
- 2003: Harbin Lange
- 2011: Tianjin Runyulong
- 2012: Guizhou Zhicheng
- 2012–2013: Shenyang Shenbei
- 2016-2017: Hunan Billows (assistant)
Medal record
Men's football
Representing China
Asian Games
Bronze medal – third place	1978 Bangkok	Football
- * Club domestic league appearances and goals

Liu Zhicai (Chinese: 刘志才; born October 20, 1954) is a Chinese football coach and a former international player. As a player he was a defender who represented Shenyang Army and Bayi Football Team while internationally he played for China in the 1980 Asian Cup.

== Management career ==
Liu Zhicai would manage amateur minor-league club Tianjin Runyulong in the 2010 league season, however the recently formed ambitious club would decide that they wanted to be a professional unit the following season and buy Anhui Jiufang's position within the second tier of Chinese football. This would then see a turbulent period in Liu's career where he would see the club move to Shenyang and rename themselves as Shenyang Shenbei while having to overhaul his squad to compete with professional football. In the 2011 league season Liu looked like he was able to produce a team that were able to fight for promotion, however it would soon be clear that the club would finish in mid-table and despite finishing in a respectable sixth there would be rumours that Liu would be sacked at the end of the season. Unfortunately these rumours would be true and the ambitious club would hire Chinese FA Cup winning coach Arie Haan at the beginning of 2012.

== Career statistics ==
=== International statistics ===
Competition	Year	Apps	Goal
Friendly	1975-1981	7	0
Asian Games	1978	7	0
Asian Cup Qualifier	1978	2	0
Total		16	0
