= Feng Shaoshun =

Chinese football player

Feng Shaoshun 冯绍顺
Personal information
- Date of birth: 3 January 1986 (age 40)
- Place of birth: Qingdao, Shandong, China
- Height: 1.77 m (5 ft 9 1/2 in)
- Positions: Right-back; midfielder

Youth career
- –2003: Qingdao Hailifeng

Senior career*
Years	Team	Apps	(Gls)
2004	Haerbin Xieli	?	(?)
2005	Weihai Aisen	?	(?)
2006–2009	Qingdao Hailifeng	85	(2)
2010	Shenyang Dongjin	8	(0)
2011–2019	Shijiazhuang Ever Bright	189	(4)
- * Club domestic league appearances and goals as of 31 December 2019

Feng Shaoshun (Chinese: 冯绍顺; pinyin: Féng Shàoshùn; born 3 January 1986 in Qingdao) is a Chinese professional football player who currently plays as a right-back or midfielder.

== Club career ==
Feng Shaoshun received organized football training at his home town club Qingdao Hailifeng. He was put on the transfer list by the end of 2003 season. He joined China League Two club Haerbin Xieli in 2004 and moved to Weihai Aisen in 2005.

Feng returned to Qingdao Hailifeng in 2006. He established himself in the club immediately and played as a regular starter. On 2 September 2009, he was involved in "own-goal gate" incident, which Qingdao Hailifeng players tried to score an own-goal in the last few minutes of a league match when they leading Sichuan F.C. 3–0. The president of Qingdao Hailifeng, Du Yunqi bet on Qingdao's victory as long as there were no fewer than four goals in the match on an overseas gambling website; however, despite informing the outfield players of this Mou Pengfei, the goalkeeper of Qingdao, stopped his teammates' own goal attempt three times as the match finished at 3–0. Feng hit a bottle to the ground after the match, which became the focus of media reports and the start of a criminal investigation.

In February 2010, Qingdao Hailifeng was banned from all future national matches organised by the Chinese Football Association for their involvement in the match-fixing scandal. Du Yunqi was arrested and sentenced to 7 years in prison, while team mates Du Bin and Liang Ming were banned from football, Feng was not implicated with the match-fixing scandal, but became an unattached player. He then signed a contract with another China League One club Shenyang Dongjin in March 2010. On 3 April 2010, he made his debut for Shenyang in the first match of the season which Shenyang Dongjin lost to Hunan Billows 1–0. On 31 July 2010, he was sent off for abusing the referee in a league match against Hunan Billows, which resulted in a ban of three matches and him being fined ¥15,000.

On 29 August 2010, after completing three matches of suspension, Feng was put on the substitution list against league leader Chengdu Blades which Shenyang finally tied with Chengdu 1–1. The fans of Chengdu could not accept this result and gathered outside the stadium in order to censure the referee. Some fans stopped the bus of Shenyang Dongjin and attacked with stones. Feng, who closed to window, was badly hurt by broken glasses at his left cornea. He received a surgery in the afternoon of 30 August, and the vision of his left eye decreased from 1.5 to 0.05. After one month's recovery, Feng discharged from the hospital on 29 September 2010. His left eye vision increased slowly to 0.4 and could not receive football training for half years.

In February 2011, Feng transferred to League Two side Fujian Smart Hero. He was issued the number 10 jersey. On 28 May 2011, he scored his first goal for Fujian in a 2–0 home victory against Chongqing F.C. He scored three goals in 22 appearances and helped Fujian promote to League One in the 2011 season. He followed the club to move to Shijiazhuang in 2013 and finally won promotion to Chinese Super League in the end of 2014 season. On 9 March 2015, Feng made his Super League debut in the season's first match which Shijiazhuang lost to Guangzhou Evergrande 2–1. Feng scored his first Super League goal on 17 April 2016 in a Hebei Derby match against Hebei China Fortune, which ensured Shijiazhuang tied with 1–1.

== Career statistics ==
Statistics accurate as of match played 31 December 2019.

Appearances and goals by club, season and competition
Club	Season	League			National Cup		Continental		Other		Total	
Club	Season	Division	Apps	Goals	Apps	Goals	Apps	Goals	Apps	Goals	Apps	Goals
Haerbin Xieli	2004	China League Two			-		-		-			
Weihai Aisen	2005	China League Two			-		-		-			
Qingdao Hailifeng	2006	China League One	21	0	0	0	-		-		21	0
Qingdao Hailifeng	2007	China League One	20	0	-		-		-		20	0
Qingdao Hailifeng	2008	China League One	24	2	-		-		-		24	2
Qingdao Hailifeng	2009	China League One	20	0	-		-		-		20	0
Qingdao Hailifeng	Total		85	2	0	0	0	0	0	0	85	2
Shenyang Dongjin	2010	China League One	8	0	-		-		-		8	0
Shijiazhuang Ever Bright	2011	China League Two	21	2	-		-		-		21	2
Shijiazhuang Ever Bright	2012	China League One	27	1	0	0	-		-		27	1
Shijiazhuang Ever Bright	2013	China League One	28	0	1	0	-		-		29	0
Shijiazhuang Ever Bright	2014	China League One	28	0	0	0	-		-		28	0
Shijiazhuang Ever Bright	2015	Chinese Super League	23	0	0	0	-		-		23	0
Shijiazhuang Ever Bright	2016	Chinese Super League	17	1	1	0	-		-		18	1
Shijiazhuang Ever Bright	2017	China League One	21	0	2	0	-		-		23	0
Shijiazhuang Ever Bright	2018	China League One	9	0	0	0	-		-		9	0
Shijiazhuang Ever Bright	2019	China League One	15	0	0	0	-		-		15	0
Shijiazhuang Ever Bright	Total		189	4	4	0	0	0	0	0	193	4
Career total			282	6	4	0	0	0	0	0	286	6
