= Yanji Stadium =

Sports venue in Yanji, China

Coordinates: 42°53′20.0″N 129°24′51.8″E

Yanji Stadium 延吉市全民健身中心体育场
- Yanji New Stadium 延吉新体育场
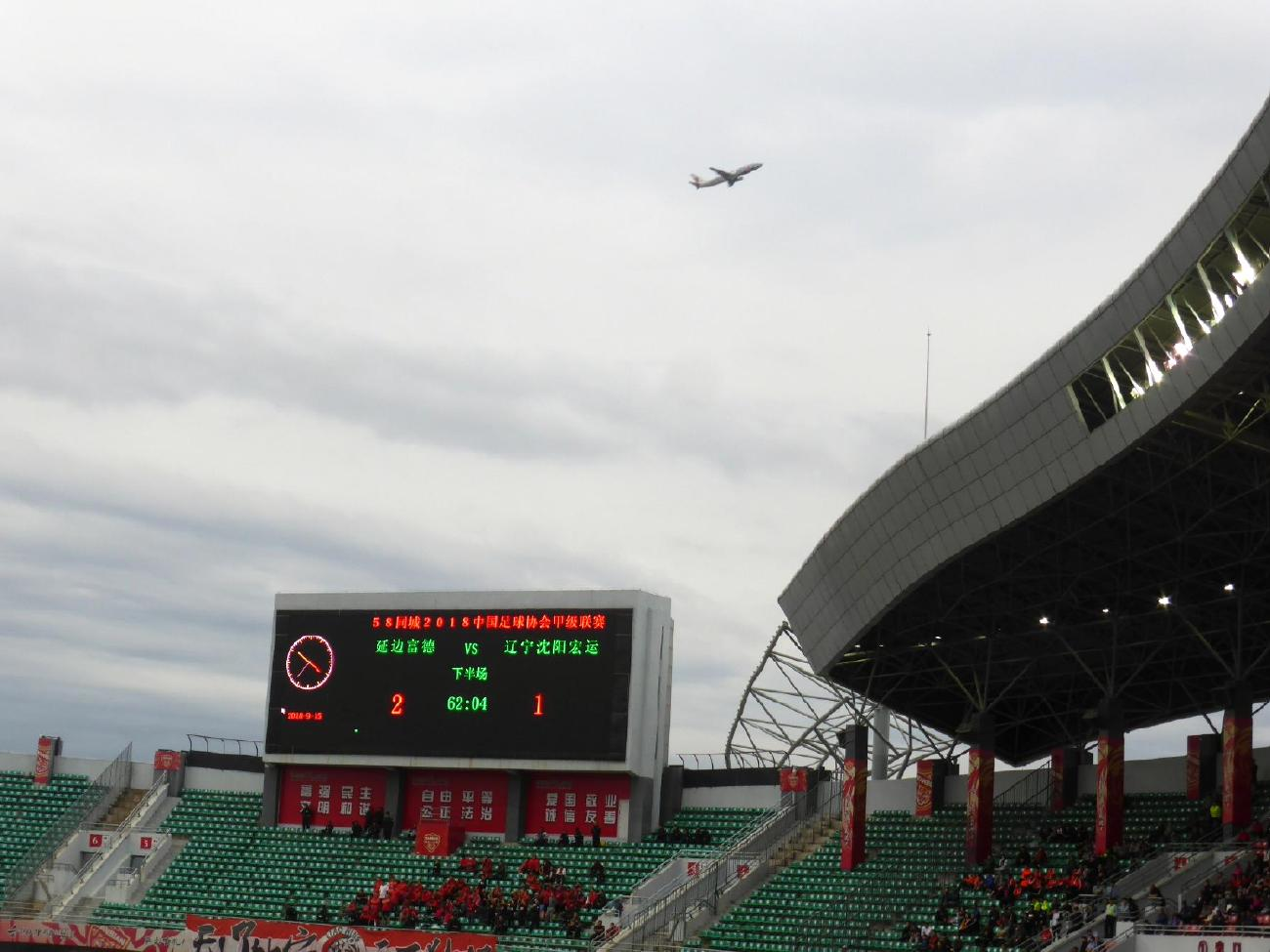
- Interactive map of Yanji Stadium 延吉市全民健身中心体育场
- Full name: Yanji Stadium 延吉市全民健身中心体育场
- Location: Yanji, Yanbian, Jilin, China
- Owner: Yanbian Korean Autonomous Prefecture Government
- Operator: Yanbian Korean Autonomous Prefecture Sports Bureau
- Capacity: 30,000
- Surface: Grass

Construction
- Built: August 2010
- Opened: November 2013
- Cost: 220 million RMB

Tenants
- Yanbian Funde (2016–2018); Yanbian Longding (2023–present）

The Yanji Stadium (Simplified Chinese: 延吉市全民健身中心体育场), a.k.a. the Yanji New Stadium (Simplified Chinese: 延吉新体育场) or Yanji People's Stadium (Simplified Chinese: 延吉人民体育场), is a multi-purpose stadium in Yanji, Yanbian Korean Autonomous Prefecture, Jilin, China. It is currently used mostly for association football matches. The stadium holds 30,000 people, and is the home stadium of Yanbian Longding. It was built in August 2010 to replace the Yanji People's Stadium and opened in November 2013, at a cost of 220 million RMB.
