= Yanji People's Stadium =

Stadium in Jilin, China

Coordinates: 42°54′45″N 129°29′17″E

The Yanji People's Stadium (Simplified Chinese: 延吉人民体育场; Korean: 연길 인민 체육장) was a multi-use stadium in Yanji, China with a capacity of 30,000 people. It is used mostly for football matches. It was demolished in 2013 to make way for a new stadium with the same name. It was the home stadium of Yanbian Changbaishan.
