= Babacar Gueye =

Senegalese footballer (born 1986)

Personal information
- Full name: Babacar Mbaye Gueye
- Date of birth: 2 March 1986 (age 40)
- Place of birth: Dakar, Senegal
- Height: 1.86 m (6 ft 1 in)
- Position: Forward

Youth career
- –2002: Génération Foot

Senior career*
Years	Team	Apps	(Gls)
2002–2003	Metz B	23	(12)
2003–2009	Metz	148	(30)
2009	→ Sedan (loan)	16	(5)
2009–2012	Alemannia Aachen	45	(4)
2009–2012	Alemannia Aachen II	5	(5)
2011–2012	→ FSV Frankfurt (loan)	13	(0)
2011–2012	→ FSV Frankfurt II (loan)	2	(0)
2012–2016	Shenzhen Ruby	126	(77)
2017	Xinjiang Tianshan Leopard	25	(15)
2018	Heilongjiang FC	25	(14)
2019	Inner Mongolia Zhongyou	22	(5)
Total		450	(167)

International career
2004–2008	Senegal	25	(6)
- * Club domestic league appearances and goals

Babacar Mbaye Gueye (born 2 March 1986) is a Senegalese former professional footballer who played as a forward. At international level, he played for the Senegal national team.

== Club career ==
Born in Dakar, Gueye began his career with Génération Foot and joined FC Metz in 2002. On 27 January 2009, the Senegalese striker was loaned to CS Sedan where he remained until June 2009. On 23 July 2009, he signed a four-year contract with German club Alemannia Aachen for a transfer fee of €500,000. During the summer break, he agreed to a one-year loan spell at FSV Frankfurt. Gueye made his first game for his new club on the season opener at home against Union Berlin, on 15 July 2011. He failed to score from the penalty spot in the dying seconds of injury time, thus the game ended in a 1–1 draw.

Gueye transferred to China League One club Shenzhen Ruby on 28 February 2012. He won two successive top scorers of the league between 2012 and 2013.

== International career ==
Gueye was a member of the Senegal national team with 25 appearances and six goals.

== Personal life ==
His younger brother is ex-Metz midfielder Ibrahima Gueye who now plays for CS Louhans-Cuiseaux and his cousin is Momar N'Diaye, who also played for Metz.

== Career statistics ==
Appearances and goals by club, season and competition
Club	Season	League			National cup		League cup		Other		Total	
Club	Season	Division	Apps	Goals	Apps	Goals	Apps	Goals	Apps	Goals	Apps	Goals
Metz B	2002–03	CFA	14	6	–		–		–		14	6
Metz B	2003–04	CFA	9	6	–		–		–		9	6
Metz B	Total		23	12	0	0	0	0	0	0	23	12
Metz	2003–04	Ligue 1	23	1	0	0	1	0	–		24	1
Metz	2004–05	Ligue 1	32	3	2	0	1	1	–		35	4
Metz	2005–06	Ligue 1	22	3	1	1	1	0	–		24	4
Metz	2006–07	Ligue 2	35	16	1	0	1	0	–		37	16
Metz	2007–08	Ligue 1	26	6	3	3	1	1	–		30	10
Metz	2008–09	Ligue 2	10	1	0	0	3	2	–		13	3
Metz	Total		148	30	7	4	8	4	0	0	163	38
Sedan (loan)	2008–09	Ligue 2	16	5	1	0	0	0	–		17	5
Alemannia Aachen	2009-10	2. Bundesliga	30	4	2	2	–		–		32	6
Alemannia Aachen	2010-11	2. Bundesliga	15	0	3	0	–		–		18	0
Alemannia Aachen	Total		45	4	5	2	0	0	0	0	50	6
Alemannia Aachen II	2009-10	NRW-Liga	1	1	–		–		–		1	1
Alemannia Aachen II	2010-11	NRW-Liga	4	4	–		–		–		4	4
Alemannia Aachen II	Total		5	5	0	0	0	0	0	0	5	5
FSV Frankfurt (loan)	2011-12	2. Bundesliga	13	0	1	2	–		–		14	2
FSV Frankfurt II (loan)	2011-12	Regionalliga Süd	2	0	–		–		–		2	0
Shenzhen Ruby	2012	China League One	28	22	2	1	–		–		30	23
Shenzhen Ruby	2013	China League One	27	23	1	1	–		–		28	24
Shenzhen Ruby	2014	China League One	28	15	0	0	–		–		28	15
Shenzhen Ruby	2015	China League One	27	12	1	0	–		–		28	12
Shenzhen Ruby	2016	China League One	16	5	0	0	–		–		16	5
Shenzhen Ruby	Total		126	77	4	2	0	0	0	0	2	1
Xinjiang Tianshan Leopard	2017	China League One	25	15	0	0	–		–		25	15
Heilongjiang Lava Spring	2018	China League One	25	14	1	1	–		–		26	15
Inner Mongolia Zhongyou	2019	China League One	22	5	0	0	–		–		22	5
Career total			450	167	19	10	8	4	0	0	477	181
