= Samuel Allegro =

French footballer (born 1978)

Personal information
- Full name: Samuel Allegro
- Date of birth: 14 March 1978 (age 48)
- Place of birth: Saint-Chamond, Loire, France
- Height: 1.82 m (6 ft 0 in)
- Position: Defender

Senior career*
Years	Team	Apps	(Gls)
1997–2002	Louhans-Cuiseaux	110	(7)
2002–2003	La Roche-sur-Yon	37	(7)
2003–2005	Metz	43	(0)
2005–2008	Châteauroux	65	(2)
2008–2010	Amiens	66	(0)
2011–2015	Red Star	136	(6)
2015–2016	Le Mans	18	(1)
2016–2018	La Suze FC		
- * Club domestic league appearances and goals

Samuel Allegro (born 14 March 1978) is a French former professional footballer who played as a defender.

He signed for then Ligue 2 side Amiens SC in the summer of 2008 from LB Châteauroux.
