= Moktar Mangane =

Senegalese footballer

Personal information
- Full name: Amadou Moktar Mangane
- Date of birth: November 15, 1982 (age 43)
- Place of birth: Rufisque, Senegal
- Position: Defender

Team information
- Current team: Tours FC
- Number: 13

Senior career*
Years	Team	Apps	(Gls)
2004–2007	FC Metz	0	(0)
2005–2006	→ Louhans-Cuiseaux (loan)	15	(0)
2007–	Tours FC	37	(0)
- * Club domestic league appearances and goals as of 17:10, 18 July 2007 (GMT)

Moktar Mangane (born November 15, 1982, Rufisque) is a Senegalese footballer who currently plays for Tours FC.
