= Jean-Philippe Caillet =

French footballer (born 1977)

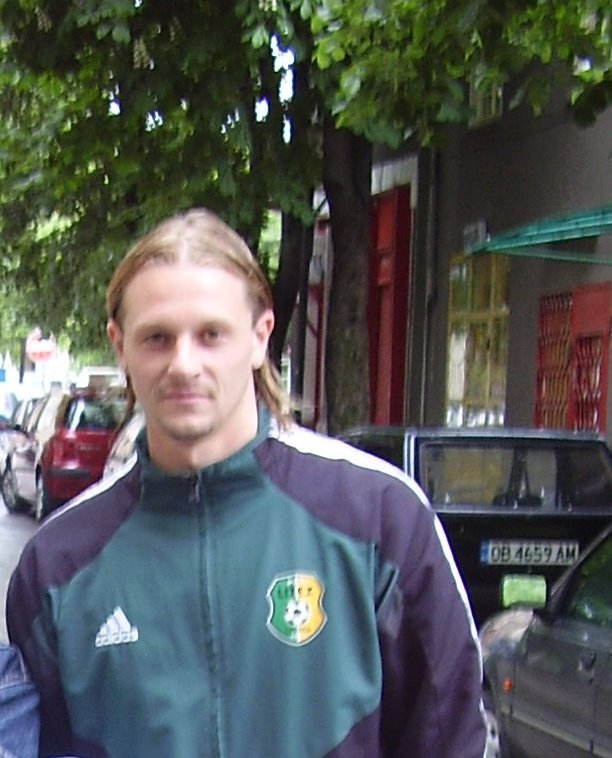
- Caillet in 2006

Personal information
- Full name: Jean-Philippe Marc Caillet
- Date of birth: 24 June 1977 (age 49)
- Place of birth: Boulay-Moselle, France
- Height: 1.84 m (6 ft 0 in)
- Position: Defender

Senior career*
Years	Team	Apps	(Gls)
1997–1998	FC Metz	0	(0)
1998–2002	SM Caen	136	(3)
2002–2004	Clermont Foot	44	(2)
2004–2005	FC Metz	23	(0)
2005–2006	Litex Lovech	19	(2)
2006–2008	Genk	56	(2)
2009	Tianjin Teda	26	(0)
2010–2013	F91 Dudelange	54	(5)
2013–2016	Differdange 03	24	(0)
- * Club domestic league appearances and goals

Jean-Philippe Marc Caillet (born 24 June 1977) is a former French footballer who played as a defender.

== Career ==
He signed a contract on 26 July and in no time established a leading position in the defense of Genk. He played 26 games last season, while he was injured from January to March.

Caillet was appointed vice captain of the side in the 2006–07 season. He has recently joined Tianjin Teda for one season before being released.

In 2006 Caillet agreed in principle to represent Bulgaria, but was found ineligible by FIFA due to having made appearances for one of the French youth national sides.
