= Diego Seoane (Uruguayan footballer) =

Uruguayan footballer (born 1976)

Personal information
- Full name: Gerardo Diego Seoane Santalla
- Date of birth: 15 September 1976 (age 50)
- Place of birth: Montevideo, Uruguay
- Height: 1.85 m (6 ft 1 in)
- Position: Forward

Senior career*
Years	Team	Apps	(Gls)
1994	Bella Vista		
1995–1997	C.A Colon		
1998–1999	El Tanque Sisley		
1999–2000	A.D Limonense		
2000	Necaxa	4	(0)
2001	Aucas		
2001–2002	Jaibos Tampico Madero		
2002	Club Nacional Táchira		
2003	Deportivo Pasto	17	(3)
2004	FC Lustenau 07	14	(6)
2004–2005	Austria Lustenau	5	(1)
2005–2006	SC Schwanenstadt	13	(7)
2006	FC Baulmes		
2006–2007	TSV Hartberg	25	(5)
2007–2008	Wiener Sport-Club		
2009	Grazer AK		
2009–2010	SV Horn		
2010	Racing Club de Montevideo		
2011	Águila	5	(0)
2011	Beijing Baxy	8	(0)
- * Club domestic league appearances and goals

Gerardo Diego Seoane Santalla (born 15 September 1976) is a Uruguayan former professional footballer played as a forward.

== Career ==
Seoane began playing football with C.A. Bella Vista at age 17.

Seoane has had a journeyman's football career, playing abroad as a forward with A.D. Limonense of Costa Rica, Club Necaxa of Mexico, Sociedad Deportiva Aucas of Ecuador, Deportivo Táchira of Venezuela, Deportivo Pasto of Colombia, Grazer AK of Austria and C.D. Águila of El Salvador.
