= Yanbian Funde F.C. =

Chinese professional soccer team

Yanbian Funde 延边富德
- Full name: Yanbian Funde Football Club 延边富德足球俱乐部
- Short name: YFC
- Founded: 1955; 71 years ago as Jilin; 1994 (Professional)
- Dissolved: 2019
- Ground: Yanji Stadium, Yanji City
- Capacity: 30,000
- Website: www.yanbianfc.com
Home colours	Away colours

Yanbian Funde F.C. (Chinese: 延边富德; pinyin: Yánbiān Fùdé) was a Chinese football club. The team was based in Yanji, Yanbian Korean Autonomous Prefecture, Jilin province where their home stadium is the Yanji Stadium that has a seating capacity of 30,000.

The club's predecessor was originally called Jilin Football Team, and they achieved one top tier domestic league title before 1994, when the club was reorganized to become a completely professional football unit. At the end of the 2000 league campaign, the club was relegated from the top tier of Chinese football, however, the club faced financial difficulties and sold the first team as well as the franchise to Zhejiang Green Town. After the sale, the club assembled the reserve team and joined the third tier before they eventually gained promotion to the second tier in 2004, and first tier in 2015. It was dissolved just before the 2019 season due to owing taxes.

== History ==
In 1955, the local Jilin government sports body would form Jilin Football Team to take part in the recently expanded Chinese football league and built a team composed mostly of Ethnic Koreans, taken from the large local Sinokorean population. After predominantly establishing themselves as a top-tier side the club achieved their first piece of silverware when they went on to win the 1965 league title. The Chinese Cultural Revolution unfortunately saw football in China halted, and Jilin were unable to immediately defend their title until football returned in the 1973 league season where they finished seventh. The following seasons would see the club struggle within the league and spend several short spells within the second tier until at the end of the 1988 league season saw the Chinese Football Association restructure the league, which not only saw the club relegated but to the third tier.

After a brief period within the third tier the club would have a resurgence and win the 1990 division title as well as promotion back into the top division after coming second within the 1992 second tier and a guaranteed spot in China's first fully professional 1994 Chinese Jia-A League season. To conform to full professionalism, they were allowed to be sponsored by Samsung and changed their team name to Jilin Samsung. The club's foray into professionalism would see them gradually establish themselves within the division under the management of Li Huen. With a foundation to build on former South Korean Head coach Choi Eun-taek was brought into the team at the beginning of the 1997 league season and he immediately guided them to become title contenders with a fourth-place finish at the end of the season. Unfortunately, the team were unable to build upon their previous season's results and Choi Eun-taek left the club, which saw Gao Hui take over the team until the club experienced relegation in 2000. The demotion was taken exceptionally hard and the club had to sell their Chinese FA registration and entire first-team to Zhejiang Green Town for 25 million Yuan. The following 2001 league campaign saw the club start at the bottom of the Chinese pyramid in the third tier with a team assembled from their former reserve squad. After taking time to gell the team would eventually come second within the 2004 season and win promotion into the second tier.

On 18 February 2013, the Chinese FA issued the club with a three-point deduction and a fine of CNY500,000 for accepting a bribe from Guangzhou Pharmaceutical to lose their 3 June 2006 eleventh round league game. The club's officials would attempt to appeal the decision, but failed after the game in question had already seen Guangzhou fined and relegated for their involvement three years earlier in China's long-running battle against match-fixing. The club's manager at the time Gao Hui was already found to be guilty of facilitating the match-fixing and was given a three-year prison sentence on 18 February 2012.

Yanbian Changbai Tiger changed their name to Yanbian Changbaishan on 8 February 2014. On the field, the club struggled throughout the whole of the 2014 league season and finished 16th within the league, in the relegation zone. On 31 January 2015, second-tier club Shaanxi Wuzhou unexpectedly failed to register for the 2015 league season due to wage arrears and was dissolved as a football club, which allowed Yanbian to remain within the division. With this reprieve insurance company Funde Holdings became interested in sponsoring the team and on 26 June 2015 signed a four-year sponsorship deal worth CNY80 million (US$12.9 million) with the club.

On 26 February 2019, Yanbian Funde was dissolved due to owing taxes, thus ending its 64-year history.

== Name history ==
Period	Club Name	First Team Name
1955–1957	Jilin	Jilin
1957–1958	Changchun	Changchun
1959–1987	Jilin	Jilin
1988	Jilin	Yanji Blue Cat
1989–1992	Jilin	Yanbian University
1993	Jilin	Jilin Samsung
1994	Yanbian	Jilin Samsung
1995–1996	Yanbian	Yanbian Hyundai Motor
1997–1998	Yanbian	Yanbian Aodong
1999–2000	Yanbian	Jilin Aodong
2001–2003	Yanbian	Yanbian
2004	Yanbian	Yanbian Century
2005–2010	Yanbian	Yanbian
2011–2013	Yanbian Changbai Tiger	Yanbian Changbai Tiger
2014	Yanbian Changbaishan	Yanbian Quanyangquan
2015	Yanbian Changbaishan	Yanbian Changbaishan
2016–2018	Yanbian Funde	Yanbian Funde

=== Managerial history ===
- (China) Piao Wanfu (1962–66)
- (China) Li Huen (1991–95)
- (China) Zheng Zhongxie (1995)
- (China) Li Huen (1996)
- (South Korea) Choi Eun-taek (1997–98)
- (China) Gao Hui (1998–00)
- (China) Li Huen (2000–03)
- (China) Gao Hui (2004–07)
- (China) Zhao Yongyuan (2008–09)
- (China) Jin Guangzhu (2009–11)
- (China) Zheng Xianglong (2011–12)
- (South Korea) Cho Keung-yeon (2012)
- (China) Jin Guangzhu (Interim) (2012)
- (South Korea) Cho Keung-yeon (2013)
- (China) Li Guanghao (Interim) (2013)
- (China) Li Huen (2014)
- (China) Li Guanghao (2014)
- (China) Gao Zhongxun (Interim) (2014)
- (South Korea) Park Tae-ha (2015–2018)
- (South Korea) Cho Jong-Hwa (Interim) (2018)
- (South Korea) Hwang Sun-hong (2019)

== Honours ==
All-time honours list including semi-professional Jilin FC period.

=== League ===
- Chinese Jia-A League/Chinese Super League (Top Tier League)
  - Winners (1): 1965
- Chinese Jia B League/China League One (Second Tier League)
  - Winners (1): 2015
- Chinese Yi League/China League Two (Third Tier League)
  - Winners (1): 1990

== Results ==
All-time league rankings

- As of the end of 2018 season.

Year	Div	Pld	W	D	L	GF	GA	GD	Pts	Pos.	FA Cup	Super Cup	AFC	Att./G	Stadium
1955	1	10	4	1	5	15	12	3	9	7	–	–	–		
1956	1	6	2	1	3	8	10	−2	9^{1}	5	DNE	–	–		
1957	1	20	8	3	9	31	41	−10	39	7	NH	–	–		
1958	1	21	8	6	7	38	33	5	43	4	NH	–	–		
1960	1	13	6	3	4	18	22	−4	4^{2}	4	R2	–	–		
1961	1	17	6	5	6	22	22	0	6^{2}	8	NH	–	–		
1962	1	19	9	4	6	28	28	0	11^{2}	5	NH	–	–		
1963	1	16	6	7	3	13	5	8	10^{2}	15	NH	–	–		
1964	2									2	NH	–	–		
1965	1	11	7	2	2	16	10	6	16	1	NH	–	–		
1973	1	24	8	2	14	31	35	−4	4^{2}	7	NH	–	–		
1974	1	19	9	3	7	26	20	6	5^{2}	8	NH	–	–		
1976	1	8	4	1	3	16	10	6	9	5^{1}	NH	–	–		
1977	1	17	7	3	7	26	28	−2	2^{2}	18	NH	–	–		
1978	2	42	26	6	10	70	34	36	58	3	NH	–	–		
1979	1	30	5	10	15	16	39	−23	20	15	NH	–	–		
1980	2	30	12	10	8	36	34	2	34	5	NH	–	–		
1981	2	30	22	–	8				44	3	NH	–	–		
1982	1	30	13	–	17	36	64	−28	26	11	NH	–	–		
1983	1	16	9	–	7	19	15	4	18	5^{3}	NH	–	–		
1984	1	–	–	–	–	–	–	–	–	–	R1	–	–		
1985	1	15	1	–	14			−15	2	16	R1	DNQ	DNQ		
1986	2	15	1^{2}	3^{2}	1^{2}	4^{2}	4^{2}	0^{2}	5^{2}	2	DNQ	DNQ	DNQ		
1987	2	20	7	5	8	26	28	−2	19	7	NH	DNQ	DNQ		
1988	1	20	5	7	8	18	23	−5	22	15	NH	DNQ	DNQ		
1989	3									4	NH	DNQ	DNQ		
1990	3	3^{2}	1^{2}	2^{2}	0^{2}	4^{2}	3^{2}	1^{2}	5^{2}	1	DNQ	DNQ	DNQ		
1991	2	17	5	9	3	21	16	5	20	4	DNQ	DNQ	DNQ		
1992	2	16	6	7	3	25	19	6	6^{2}	2^{4}	R1	DNQ	DNQ		
1993	2	9	3	2/1	3	10	8	2	4^{2}	4	NH	DNQ	DNQ		
1994	1	22	6	7	9	25	31	−6	19	10	NH	DNQ	DNQ	21,818	
1995	1	22	6	9	7	24	29	−5	27	7	R1	DNQ	DNQ	27,818	
1996	1	22	4	8	10	20	30	−10	20	10	R1	DNQ	DNQ	25,545	
1997	1	22	8	5	9	23	23	0	29	4	R1	DNQ	DNQ	33,000	
1998	1	26	9	4	13	25	31	−6	31	11	R1	DNQ	DNQ	27,538	
1999	1	26	8	9	9	27	40	−13	33	8	R3	DNQ	DNQ	26,692	Yanji People's Stadium
2000	1	26	4	5	17	20	45	−25	17	14	R2	DNQ	DNQ	12,385	
2001	3									7	DNQ	DNQ	DNQ		
2002	3									5	DNQ	DNQ	DNQ		
2003	3	13	6	5	2	16	6	10	19^{1}	3	R1	DNQ	DNQ		Yanji People's Stadium
2004	3	23	20	1	2	72	15	57	52^{1}	RU	DNQ	DNQ	DNQ		Yanji People's Stadium
2005	2	26	10	3	13	43	41	2	33	8	R1	DNQ	DNQ		Yanji People's Stadium
2006	2	24	8	5	11	28	22	6	29	8	R1	DNQ	DNQ		Hailanjiang Stadium
2007	2	24	9	6	9	36	35	1	33	6	NH	DNQ	DNQ		Yanji People's Stadium
2008	2	24	8	4	12	32	39	−7	28	9	NH	DNQ	DNQ		Yanji People's Stadium
2009	2	24	7	8	9	29	30	−1	29	6	NH	DNQ	DNQ		Hailanjiang Stadium / Yanji People's Stadium
2010	2	24	12	4	8	30	21	9	40	3	NH	DNQ	DNQ		Yanji People's Stadium
2011	2	26	8	6	12	30	36	−6	30	10	QF	DNQ	DNQ		Yanji People's Stadium
2012	2	30	10	4	16	39	51	−12	34	13	R3	DNQ	DNQ	5,372	Hailanjiang Stadium
2013	2	30	9	7	14	42	52	−10	31^{5}	11	R2	DNQ	DNQ	4,846	Hailanjiang Stadium / Tumen Stadium
2014	2	30	3	9	18	29	45	−29	18	16^{6}	R4	DNQ	DNQ	7,992	Hailanjiang Stadium / Yanji Nationwide Fitness Centre Stadium
2015	2	30	17	10	3	59	24	35	61	1	R3	DNQ	DNQ	24,491	Yanji Nationwide Fitness Centre Stadium
2016	1	30	10	7	13	39	41	−2	37	9	R3	DNQ	DNQ	19,305	Yanji Nationwide Fitness Centre Stadium
2017	1	30	5	7	18	32	64	−32	22	15	R3	DNQ	DNQ	18,058	Yanji Nationwide Fitness Centre Stadium
2018	2	30	11	5	14	34	36	−2	37	10^{7}	R3	DNQ	DNQ	9,853	Yanji Nationwide Fitness Centre Stadium

No league games in 1959, 1966–72, 1975; Jilin didn't compete in 1984

- ^1 In group stage. ^2In final group stage. ^3 In North League. *^3 ^4Promoted to 1994 top tier. ^5 Retrospectively deducted 3 points for a match-fixing scandal in 2006. ^6 Guangdong Sunray Cave and Chengdu Tiancheng dissolved, so Yanbian could stay at second level.. *^7 Relegated for financial trouble.

Key

	China top division
	China second division
	China third division
	China fourth division
W	Winners
RU	Runners-up
3	Third place
	Relegated

- Pld = Played
- W = Games won
- D = Games drawn
- L = Games lost
- F = Goals for
- A = Goals against
- Pts = Points
- Pos = Final position
- DNQ = Did not qualify
- DNE = Did not enter
- NH = Not Held
- – = Does Not Exist
- R1 = Round 1
- R2 = Round 2
- R3 = Round 3
- R4 = Round 4
- F = Final
- SF = Semi-finals
- QF = Quarter-finals
- R16 = Round of 16
- Group = Group stage
- GS2 = Second Group stage
- QR1 = First Qualifying Round
- QR2 = Second Qualifying Round
- QR3 = Third Qualifying Round

== Notable players ==
Had international caps for their respective countries.

Yanbian F.C. period

Africa

- (Cameroon) Aboubakar Oumarou
- (The Gambia) Bubacarr Trawally
- (Ghana) Daniel Quaye
- (Guinea-Bissau) Emiliano Té
- (Mali) Soumaila Coulibaly
- (Nigeria) Abdulafees Abdulsalam
- (Rwanda) Jean-Paul Eale Lutula
- (Zaire) Zola Kiniambi

Asia

- (China) Chi Wenyi
- (China) Chi Zhongguo
- (China) Jin Jingdao
- (China) Piao Cheng
- (North Korea) Kim Yong-jun
- (South Korea) Hwang Il-su
- (South Korea) Kim Seung-dae
- (South Korea) Ko Ki-gu
- (South Korea) Yoon Bit-garam

Europe

- (Albania) Valdet Rama
- (Hungary) Richárd Guzmics

Jilin F.C. period

Africa

- (Rwanda) Claude Kalisa
- (Senegal) Cheikh Gadiaga
- (Zaire) Zola Kiniambi
- (Zaire) Bulayima Mukuayanzo

Asia

- (China) Cui Guangri
- (China) Gao Zhongxun
- (China) Jiang Feng
- (China) Jin Guangzhu
- (China) Li Hongjun
- (China) Xu Jingxiu

Europe

- (Hungary) András Telek
