= Jin Guangzhu =

Chinese footballer

Personal information
- Date of birth: 7 April 1968 (age 58)
- Place of birth: Jilin, China
- Position: Defender

Senior career*
Years	Team	Apps	(Gls)
1994–1997	Yanbian Hyundai	56	(8)
1999	Guangzhou Apollo	0	(0)

International career
1994–1996	China	6	(0)

Managerial career
- 2009: Yanbian FC (assistant)
- 2009-2010: Yanbian FC
- 2012: Yanbian Changbai Tiger (caretaker)
Medal record
Men's football
Representing China
Asian Games
Silver medal – second place	1994 Hiroshima	Football
- * Club domestic league appearances and goals

Jin Guangzhu (Chinese: 金光柱) is a former Chinese footballer who played as a defender for the China national football team.

== Career statistics ==
=== Club ===
Club	Season	League			Cup		Continental		Other		Total	
Club	Season	Division	Apps	Goals	Apps	Goals	Apps	Goals	Apps	Goals	Apps	Goals
Yanbian Hyundai	1994	Jia-A	16	1	0	0	–		0	0	18	2
Yanbian Hyundai	1995	Jia-A	20	3	0	0	–		0	0	18	2
Yanbian Hyundai	1996	Jia-A	18	4	0	0	–		0	0	18	2
Yanbian Hyundai	1997	Jia-A	2	0	0	0	–		0	0	18	2
Yanbian Hyundai	Total		56	8	0	0	0	0	0	0	56	8
Guangzhou Apollo	1999	Jia-A	0	0	0	0	–		0	0	0	0
Career total			56	8	0	0	0	0	0	0	56	8

=== International ===
National team	Year	Apps	Goals
China	1994	5	0
China	1995	0	0
China	1996	1	0
Total		6	0
