= Johnny Woodly =

Costa Rican footballer (born 1980)

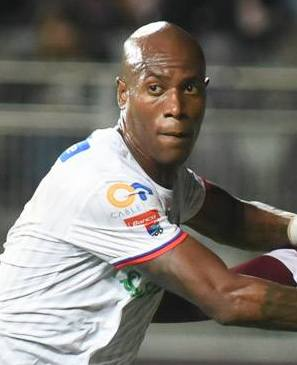

Personal information
- Full name: Johnny Mauricio Woodly Lambert
- Date of birth: July 27, 1980 (age 46)
- Place of birth: San José, Costa Rica
- Height: 1.87 m (6 ft 2 in)
- Position: Forward

Senior career*
Years	Team	Apps	(Gls)
2003–2004	Carmelita		
2005	Brujas	2	(0)
2006	Miramar Misiones	15	(1)
2006	Carmelita	16	(2)
2006	Brujas	11	(1)
2007	Alianza		
2007	Brujas	14	(0)
2008–2009	San Carlos	13	(3)
2009	Chongqing Lifan	30	(10)
2010	Changchun Yatai	13	(4)
2010	→ Chongqing Lifan (loan)	15	(5)
2011	Dalian Aerbin	24	(13)
2012–2013	Shijiazhuang Yongchang	56	(33)
2014	Xinjiang Tianshan Leopard	29	(16)
2015	Carmelita	15	(5)
2015–2016	Municipal	18	(3)
2016	Carmelita	13	(7)
2016	Alajuelense	24	(6)
2017	San Carlos	18	(8)
2017	Grecia	22	(5)
2018	Cartaginés	8	(1)
2019	La U Universitarios	21	(6)
2019–2020	Barrio México	0	(0)
2021	Jacó	0	(0)

International career
2016	Costa Rica		
- * Club domestic league appearances and goals as of 21:24, 20 January 2020 (UTC)

Johnny Mauricio Woodly Lambert (Spanish pronunciation: [ˈɟʝoni ˈwuðli]; born July 27, 1980) is a Costa Rican former footballer who played as a forward.

== Club career ==
He started his career at Carmelita and had a spell at Brujas, before moving abroad to Uruguayan side Miramar Misiones in summer 2005. He returned to Costa Rica to play for Carmelita and Brujas again. In 2007, Woodly moved to El Salvador, to play for Alianza only to return to Brujas and then San Carlos. He then signed for Chinese outfit Chongqing Lifan in March 2009.

He transferred to Dalian Aerbin in January 2011. Dalian successfully achieved League One champions for the first time in the 2011 league season. He finished the season with the League One top scorer, scored 13 goals, which shared with Mitchel Brown.

He transferred to another Chinese second-tier club, Fujian Smart Hero, in US$150,000 in February 2011. Scoring 21 goals in 28 appearances in the 2012 season, he extended his contract with the club and followed the club to move to Shijiazhuang in 2013, making him the longest serving Tico in China.

In February 2014, Woodly transferred to China League One side Xinjiang Tianshan Leopard.

At the end of August 2019, Woodly left La U Universitarios and joined C.D. Barrio México.

== International career ==
Woodly was called up to Costa Rica's Copa America Centenario squad to replace the injured Ariel Rodríguez.

== Chinese League career statistics ==
(Correct as of 2013)

Season	Club	League	League		FA Cup		CSL Cup		Asia		Total	
Season	Club	League	Apps	Goals	Apps	Goals	Apps	Goals	Apps	Goals	Apps	Goals
2009	Chongqing Lifan	Chinese Super League	30	10	-	-	-	-	-	-	30	10
2010	Changchun Yatai	Chinese Super League	13	4	-	-	-	-	4	3	17	7
2010	Chongqing Lifan	Chinese Super League	15	5	-	-	-	-	-	-	15	5
2011	Dalian Aerbin	China League One	24	13	1	2	-	-	-	-	25	15
2012	Fujian Smart Hero	China League One	28	21	0	0	-	-	-	-	28	21
2013	Fujian Smart Hero	China League One	28	12	0	0	-	-	-	-	28	12
2014	Xinjiang Tianshan Leopard	China League One	29	16	0	0	-	-	-	-	29	16
Total			167	81	1	2	0	0	4	3	168	83

== Honours ==
=== Clubs ===
Dalian Aerbin

- China League One: 2011

=== Individual ===
- China League One top scorer: 2011
