= Mitchel Brown =

Honduran footballer (born 1981)

Personal information
- Full name: Glen Mitchel Brown James
- Date of birth: 16 July 1981 (age 45)
- Place of birth: La Ceiba, Honduras
- Height: 1.83 m (6 ft 0 in)
- Position: Striker

Youth career
- Victoria Leyde

Senior career*
Years	Team	Apps	(Gls)
2000	Derthona	15	(7)
2001	Brescia		
2002–2004	Suchitepéquez		(45)
2004–2005	Motagua	7	(1)
2005–2007	Victoria	69	(16)
2007	Marathón	18	(8)
2007–2008	Tatran Prešov	20	(7)
2008	Qingdao Jonoon	23	(7)
2009	Marathón	34	(13)
2010–2011	Hunan Billows	39	(20)
2012	Marathón	34	(8)
2013–2014	Hubei China-Kyle	15	(6)
2014	Marathón	12	(1)
2015	Vida	6	(0)

International career^{‡}
2008–2013	Honduras	3	(0)
- * Club domestic league appearances and goals as of 30 October 2011 ‡ National team caps and goals as of 6 February 2008

Glen Mitchel Brown James (Spanish pronunciation: [ˈmitʃel ˈβɾawn]; (Note: In isolation, Brown is pronounced [ˈbɾawn].) born 16 July 1981), nicknamed "El Depredador" (The Predator), is a Honduran professional footballer.

== Club career ==
A much-travelled forward, Brown has played in Italy, Guatemala, Slovakia and China along with his native Honduras.

His first goal was against Universidad playing for F.C. Motagua and after scoring he was expelled for taking off his shirt. He joined Qingdao Jonoon in 2008. He scored his first goal on the club on 9 April 2008.

=== China ===
Brown signed a contract with Hunan Billows in February 2010. He made his China League One debut for Hunan against Shenyang Dongjin on 3 April. Brown scored his first goal for the club on his fourth appearance, in a 2–1 home win against Shanghai East Asia on 22 April. In the 2010 league season, Brown was the top scorer of the club. He scored 7 goals in 19 appearances and won a new contract of the club. In January 2011, Costa Rican club L.D. Alajuelense was reported to be interested in Brown but a deal never materialized.

Brown finished the 2011 league season with the League One top scorer, scored 13 goals in 20 appearances, which shared with Johnny Woodly.

In August 2012, while playing for Marathón, Brown was involved in an incident in which Motagua goalkeeper Kerpo de León was critically injured and a committee summoned an investigation.

== International career ==
He made his debut for the national side on 6 February 2008 in a friendly against Paraguay, coming on as a substitute for Carlos Costly.

== Honours ==
Club

- Honduran League: 2007 Apertura, 2009 Apertura (Marathón),
- Runner-up with Victoria: 2006 Clausura
- Runner-up with Suchitepequez:
- Promotion with Suchitepequez

Individual

- China League One top scorer: 2011
