= Hailanjiang Stadium =

Sports venue in Longjing, Jilin, China

Coordinates: 42°45′38″N 129°22′34″E

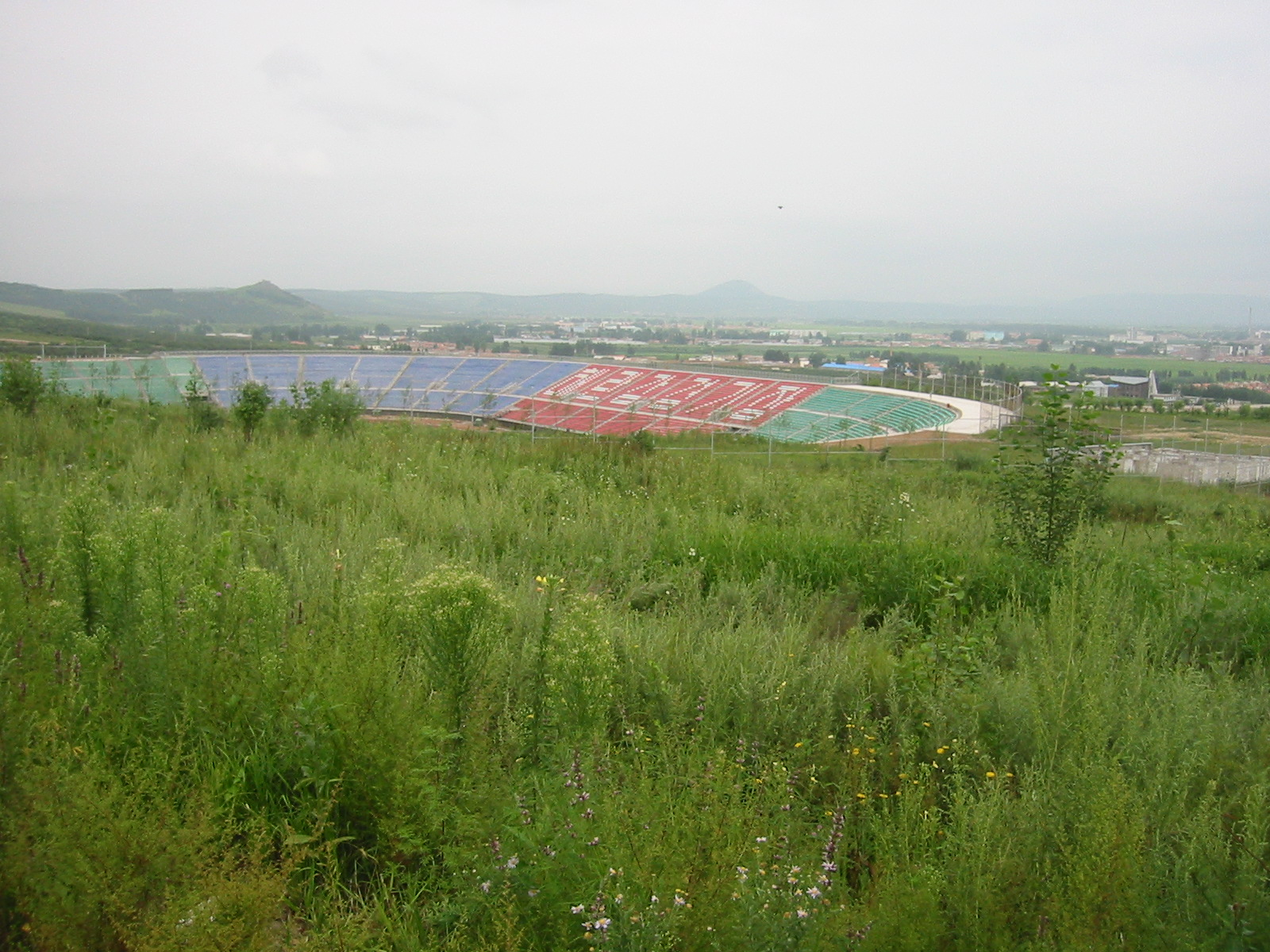
Hailanjiang Stadium

Hailanjiang Stadium (Simplified Chinese: 海兰江体育场, Korean: 해란강체육장) is a multi-use stadium in Longjing, Yanbian, Jilin province, China. It is currently used mostly for football matches. The stadium holds 32,000 people.

== See also ==
- Sports in China
