= Soumaïla Coulibaly (footballer, born 1978) =

Malian footballer

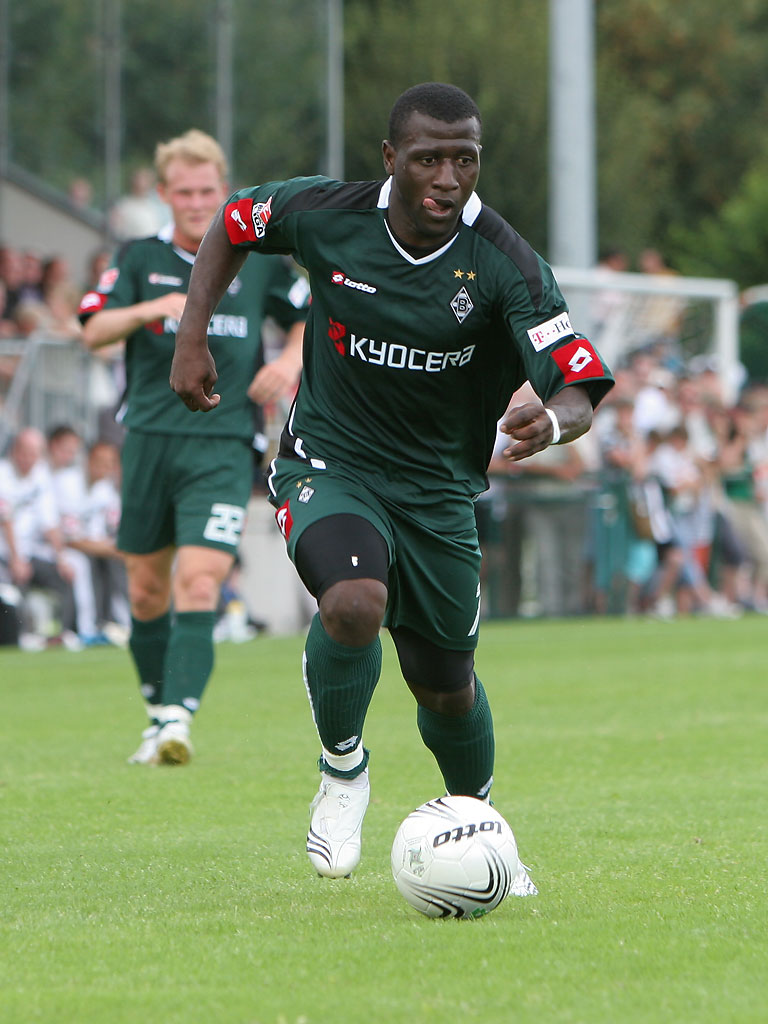
- Coulibaly with Borussia Mönchengladbach in 2007

Personal information
- Date of birth: 15 April 1978 (age 48)
- Place of birth: Bamako, Mali
- Height: 1.79 m (5 ft 10 in)
- Position: Midfielder

Youth career
- 1994–1996: Djoliba AC

Senior career*
Years	Team	Apps	(Gls)
1995–1997	Djoliba AC	16	(3)
1997–2000	Zamalek	32	(6)
2000–2007	SC Freiburg	210	(37)
2007–2009	Borussia Mönchengladbach	30	(3)
2009–2010	FSV Frankfurt	9	(0)
2011–2012	Yanbian FC	31	(8)
Total		328	(57)

International career
1995–2009	Mali	67	(6)

Managerial career
- 2023–2025: Mali U-17
- 2025–2026: AS Bakaridjan
- * Club domestic league appearances and goals

Soumaïla Coulibaly (born 15 April 1978) is a Malian former professional footballer who played as a midfielder and football manager. While playing for clubs such as Zamalek, SC Freiburg, and Borussia Mönchengladbach at club level, he scored six goals and made 67 appearances for the Mali national team from 1995 to 2009.

== Career ==
Coulibaly was born in Bamako, Mali.

=== Playing career ===
On 8 July 2009, he signed a one-year contract for FSV Frankfurt after being released by Borussia Mönchengladbach. On 23 February 2010, he was released by FSV Frankfurt after playing only nine matches for the club.

On 8 May 2011, Coulibaly signed on a free transfer to play for Chinese League One team Yanbian FC.

He ended his active playing career in 2013.

=== Coaching career ===
In April 2023, Coulibaly took over as head coach of the Malian U-17 team.

== Personal life ==
Coulibaly is the brother of Boubacar Coulibaly and played with him for a long time at SC Freiburg.

== Honours ==
Djoliba AC

- Malian Première Division: 1995–96, 1996–97

Zamalek

- Egypt Cup: 1998–99

SC Freiburg

- 2. Bundesliga: 2002–03

Borussia Mönchengladbach

- 2. Bundesliga: 2007–08
