= Momar N'Diaye =

Senegalese footballer (born 1987)

Personal information
- Full name: Momar Ramon N'Diaye
- Date of birth: 13 July 1987 (age 39)
- Place of birth: Yeumbeul, Senegal
- Height: 1.80 m (5 ft 11 in)
- Position: Forward

Team information
- Current team: Rodange 91
- Number: 11

Youth career
- 1999–2001: Génération Foot

Senior career*
Years	Team	Apps	(Gls)
2001–2005	Metz B	35	(21)
2004–2009	Metz	77	(11)
2008–2009	→ Châteauroux (loan)	15	(0)
2010	Rot Weiss Ahlen	6	(1)
2010–2012	FSV Frankfurt	25	(5)
2012	Beijing Baxy	14	(7)
2013–2015	Louhans-Cuiseaux	9	(1)
2015–2016	Jeunesse Esch	25	(24)
2016–2017	F91 Dudelange	12	(1)
2017–2019	Jeunesse Esch	46	(19)
2019–	Rodange 91	58	(15)

International career
2005	Senegal	1	(1)
- * Club domestic league appearances and goals as of 12 May 2022

Momar Ramon N'Diaye (born 13 July 1987) is a Senegalese professional footballer who plays for FC Rodange 91.

== Career ==
Born in Yeumbeul, N'Diaye began his career with Génération Foot. He joined FC Metz in 2001. He played on loan for Châteauroux in the 2008–09 season. On 21 January 2010, he left Metz to sign for Rot Weiss Ahlen. After a half year and the relegation of Rot Weiss Ahlen, he left the club on 27 May 2010 to sign for FSV Frankfurt.

Ahead of the 2019–20 season, N'Diaye joined FC Rodange 91.

== International career ==
In 2005, at 18, N'Diaye made his debut for the Senegal national football team.

== Personal life ==
His cousins are Ibrahima Gueye and Babacar Gueye, who also played for Metz.

== Career statistics ==
=== International ===
Appearances and goals by national team and year
National team	Year	Apps	Goals
Senegal	2005	1	1
Total		1	1

Scores and results list Senegal's goal tally first, score column indicates score after each N'Diaye goal.

List of international goals scored by Momar N'Diaye
No.	Date	Venue	Opponent	Score	Result	Competition
1	12 November 2005	EPRU Stadium, Port Elizabeth, South Africa	South Africa	3–2	3–2	2005 Nelson Mandela Challenge
