= Daniel Quaye =

Ghanaian former professional footballer (born 1980)

Dan Quaye
Personal information
- Full name: Daniel Quaye
- Date of birth: 25 December 1980 (age 45)
- Place of birth: Accra, Ghana
- Height: 5 ft 10 in (1.78 m)
- Position: Defender

Senior career*
Years	Team	Apps	(Gls)
1997–1998	Accra Great Olympics		
1998–2007	Hearts of Oak		
2007	Chongqing Lifan	15	(0)
2008	Hearts of Oak		
2008	Chongqing Lifan	19	(0)
2008–2009	Eleven Wise		
2009–2011	Yanbian FC	55	(1)
2012	Beijing Baxy	14	(2)
2015	Bechem United		
2015–2017	Hearts of Oak		

International career
1997	Ghana U-20	5	(0)
2001–2006	Ghana	10	(0)
- * Club domestic league appearances and goals

Daniel Quaye (born 25 December 1980) is a former Ghanaian professional footballer who played as a defender for seven clubs after his debut in 1997. He retired in 2017.

== Club career ==
After nine years of playing for the Accra Hearts of Oak, Quaye departed the club and signed for the Chinese club known as Chongqing Lifan, where he played 15 matches before returning to the Hearts of Oak in August 2007. He was later released by the Hearts of Oak and moved back to Chongqing Lifan in March 2008. In January 2009, he left Chongqing Lifan for a second time and signed for Eleven Wise in Sekondi, Ghana on 9 April 2009. In the summer of 2009, he moved back to China and signed for Yanbian FC. Quaye extended his contract with Yanbian FC at the beginning of the 2010 China League One season.

Quaye signed with Beijing Sport University F.C. in February 2012.

== International career ==
Quaye made nine international appearances for the Ghana national football team. He participated in the 2006 World Cup and was also a member of the Ghana national under-17 football team at the 1997 FIFA U-17 World Championship.

== Achievements ==
As a squad member for the 2006 World Cup in Germany, Quaye was a part of the team that achieved a historic second-place finish in Group E before a 3–0 defeat to Brazil in the round of 16, marking Ghana's first World Cup appearance. Alongside his teammates, Quaye received a Grand Medal of national honor from President John Kufuor.
