= Johnson Macaba =

Angolan footballer

Personal information
- Full name: Johnson Monteiro Pinto Macaba
- Date of birth: November 23, 1978 (age 47)
- Place of birth: Luanda, Angola
- Height: 1.86 m (6 ft 1 in)
- Position: Striker

Senior career*
Years	Team	Apps	(Gls)
1998–1999	São Bernardo-SP		
2000	Francana		
2001	União Barbarense		
2001	Gama	2	(0)
2002	Londrina		
2002–2004	Malatyaspor	9	(0)
2004	América-SP		
2005	Juventus-SP		
2006	Portuguesa	2	(0)
2006–2010	Goiás	19	(3)
2007–2008	→ Santa Cruz (loan)	13	(2)
2008	→ Shenzhen Shangqingyin (loan)	27	(13)
2009	→ C.R.D. Libolo (loan)		
2010	→ Chengdu Blades (loan)	21	(12)
2011	Shenzhen Phoenix	10	(4)
2011	Chongqing Lifan	12	(5)
2012	Grêmio Catanduvense		
2012	Atlético Sorocaba		
2012	Chengdu Blades	14	(2)

International career
2001–2010	Angola	11	(0)
- * Club domestic league appearances and goals as of 30 October 2011

Johnson Monteiro Pinto Macaba (born November 23, 1978, in Luanda, Angola), or simply Johnson Macaba, is an Angolan football striker.

== Football career ==
The striker has played for Malatyaspor in Turkey, Portuguesa de Desportos and Goiás in Brazil.

Johnson signed a three-year contract with Malatyaspor in summer 2002. He made seven league appearances, and almost loaned to Konyaspor in summer 2003. But the loan deal had failed. Johnson stayed with Malatyaspor, made two more league appearances, before the contract was mutually terminated in May 2004.

He signed a contract run until December 2010 with Goiás of Brazilian Série A in June 2006.

He was on loan to Santa Cruz of Série B in July 2007.

At the beginning of CSL Season 2008, He was transferred to Shenzhen Shangqingyin.

In February 2010, he came to China again and was loaned to Chengdu Blades which was newly demoted from the top flight by CFA for match-fixing scandal.

=== International career ===
Johnson is better known in Brazil, than in his home country Angola, where the people had doubts about his call-up for 2006 African Cup of Nations.

== National team statistics ==
Angola national team
Year	Apps	Goals
2001	3	0
2002	0	0
2003	2	0
2004	0	0
2005	0	0
2006	2	0
2007	0	0
2008	0	0
2009	3	0
2010	1	0
Total	11	0
