= Beijing Sport University F.C. =

Association football club in China

Beijing BSU Běijīng Běitǐdà 北京北体大
- Full name: Beijing Sport University Football Club 北京北体大足球俱乐部
- Founded: 2004; 22 years ago (as Beijing Baxy&Shengshi F.C.); 2019 (as BSU F.C.)
- Dissolved: 29 March 2023; 3 years ago

Beijing Sport University Football Club (Chinese: 北京北体大; pinyin: Běijīng Běitǐdà), commonly known as BSU (Chinese: 北体大; pinyin: Běi Tǐ Dà), was a Chinese professional football club that participated in the China League One division under license from the Chinese Football Association (CFA). The team was based in Beijing. The club was dissolved in March 2023.

== History ==
Beijing Baxy&Shengshi F.C. was founded in 2004 by former Chinese footballers Guo Weiwei, Wang Tao and Guo Weijian as an amateur football club. By 2009 the club's youth team were considered good enough to take part in professional football and the club entered the third tier of Chinese football at the beginning of the 2009 China League Two season. Within their first professional campaign Wang Tao was their chairman who brought in Cao Xiandong to manage the team. The players wore white tops, black bottoms, white socks for the home kits and blue tops, white bottoms, dark blue socks for their away kit. After a promising start to the campaign that saw them lead the table within the group stage the club ultimately finished third in the play-off and just missed out of promotion to the second division. After failure to win promotion from the previous season the club decided to take over financially struggling China League One side Beijing Hongdeng and took over their position within the league at the beginning of the 2010 league season. In their first season in the second tier, they were given a 6-point deduction due to Beijing Hongdeng's late payment of wages for Rajko Vidović in the 2007 season.

In 2011, they renamed themselves Beijing Baxy. They finished 15th out of 16 teams in the 2012 season and was supposed to relegate to China League Two; however, they were spared from relegation due to Dalian Shide's dissolution. On 26 February 2013, Croatian manager Goran Tomić was officially announced as the new coach of the club. After signing some high level players such as Stephen Makinwa, Lucian Goian, Ryan Griffiths and Hu Zhaojun, they finished historic high record of 7th place in the 2013 season. In the next year, they had a 21-match-unbeaten (8 wins and 13 draws) start in the 2014 season. They remained the hope of promotion until the last round and eventually finished in 4th place. Goran Tomić won China League One Coach of the Year award in December 2014.

On 25 December 2014, Beijing Enterprises Holdings Limited bought majority shares of the club and the club name was changed into Beijing Enterprises Group. They would also change the club's badge and home kit from all white to blue and red as well as bring in former Beijing Guoan manager Aleksandar Stanojević on 12 January 2015 on a three-year contract with the club.

On 30 December 2016, the team officially sacked Aleksandar Stanojević, and signed Yasen Petrov as their new manager. On 5 June 2017, Beijing Enterprise player, Cheick Tioté died after suffering a heart attack during training at the age of 30. The club retired Tioté's number 24 shirt on 24 June 2017.

On 23 June 2017, in the pre-match media conference, team manager Gao Hongbo announced that team has signed former Everton and Sunderland forward Victor Anichebe as a free agent.

=== Name history ===
- 2004–2010: Beijing Baxy&Shengshi F.C. (北京八喜盛世)
- 2011–2014: Beijing Baxy F.C. (北京八喜)
- 2015–2018: Beijing Enterprises Group F.C. (北京控股)
- 2019–2022: Beijing Sport University F.C. (北京北体大)

=== Retired numbers ===
24 – (Ivory Coast) Cheick Tioté, Midfielder, 2017 posthumous. The number was retired in June 2017.

=== Managerial history ===
Only League matches are counted.

Name	From	To	Pld	W	D	L	Notes
(China) Xu Hui	2009	2009	15	8	3	4	
(China) Cao Xiandong	2010	2010	24	10	4	10	
(Belgium) Piet Demol	2011	2011	5	1	1	3	
(China) Cao Xiandong	2011	2011	21	6	8	7	
(China) Cui Enlang	2012	2012	15	3	2	10	
(China) Gai Zengjun	2012	2012	4	1	1	2	
(China) Cao Xiandong (China) Wang Tao	2012	2012	11	4	4	3	
(Croatia) Goran Tomić	2013	2014	60	25	21	14	2014 Chinese League One Manager of the Year
(Serbia) Aleksandar Stanojević	2015	2016	60	28	13	19	
(Bulgaria) Yasen Petrov	2017	2017	6	0	1	5	
(China) Gao Hongbo	2017	2019	77	33	19	25	
(China) Su Maozhen	2019	2021	32	8	9	15	

== Grounds ==
The club's home ground was the Chaoyang Sports Centre which is located on Yaojiayuan Road No. 77 in the Chaoyang District. The stadium was used during the 2008 Beijing Olympics and the grounds also incorporate a golf driving range, equestrian shop, baseball venue, indoor tennis, and training pitches. Baxy do not train at this venue, but amateur football club Forbidden City Football Club often play weekend matches at the pitches located directly behind the main stadium. They moved their new home stadium to Olympic Sports Centre (Beijing) in 2015.

== Results ==
All-time League Rankings

- As of the end of 2019 season.

Year	Tier	Pld	W	D	L	GF	GA	GD	Pts	Pos	Cup	Asian	Avg league att	Stadium
2009	3	15	8	3	4	25	22	+3	21^{1}	3	NH	DNQ		Eastern Aojing Sports Centre
2010	2	24	10	4	10	24	24	0	28^{2}	8	NH	DNQ		Chaoyang Sports Centre
2011	2	26	7	9	10	18	28	−10	30	11	R1	DNQ		Chaoyang Sports Centre
2012	2	30	8	7	15	34	46	−12	31	15	R2	DNQ	845	Shijingshan Stadium
2013	2	30	11	8	11	35	42	−7	41	7	R2	DNQ	2,269	Chaoyang Sports Centre
2014	2	30	14	13	3	45	27	18	55	4	R2	DNQ	1,668	Chaoyang Sports Centre
2015	2	30	17	5	8	48	29	19	56	4	SF	DNQ	5,435	Olympic Sports Centre (Beijing)
2016	2	30	11	8	11	40	38	2	41	8	R3	DNQ	3,463	Olympic Sports Centre (Beijing)
2017	2	30	11	4	15	43	50	-7	37	8	R2	DNQ	5,227	Olympic Sports Centre (Beijing)
2018	2	30	12	11	7	43	34	9	47	5	R3	DNQ	2,083	Olympic Sports Centre (Beijing)
2019	2	30	13	7	10	51	30	21	46	8	R4	DNQ		Olympic Sports Centre (Beijing)

- ^1 in group stage ^26-point deduction for late payment of wages

Key

	China top division
	China second division
	China third division
C	Champions
RU	Runners-up
3	Third place
	Relegated

- Pld = Played
- W = Games won
- D = Games drawn
- L = Games lost
- F = Goals for
- A = Goals against
- Pts = Points
- Pos = Final position
- DNQ = Did not qualify
- DNE = Did Not Enter
- NH = Not Held
- - = Does Not Exist
- R1 = Round 1
- R2 = Round 2
- R3 = Round 3
- R4 = Round 4
- F = Final
- SF = Semi-finals
- QF = Quarter-finals
- R16 = Round of 16
- Group = Group stage
- GS2 = Second Group stage
- QR1 = First Qualifying Round
- QR2 = Second Qualifying Round
- QR3 = Third Qualifying Round

== Notable players ==
Had international caps for their respective countries.

Africa

- (Ghana) Daniel Quaye
- (Ivory Coast) Cheick Tioté
- (Nigeria) Victor Anichebe
- (Nigeria) Stephen Makinwa
- (Senegal) Momar N'Diaye

Asia

- (Australia) Ryan Griffiths
- (China) Hu Zhaojun
- (China) Lu Jiang
- (China) Lü Peng
- (China) Yan Xiangchuang
- (China) Yu Tao
- (Chinese Taipei) Chen Hao-wei
- (Chinese Taipei) Wen Chih-hao
- (Hong Kong) Godfred Karikari

Europe

- (Austria) Rubin Okotie
- (Romania) Lucian Goian
- (Serbia) (Netherlands) Danko Lazović

== See also ==
- Beijing Sport University
