= List of Chinese football transfers summer 2014 =

This is a list of Chinese football transfers for the 2014 season summer transfer window. Only moves from Super League and League One are listed. The transfer window will be opened from 7 July 2014 to 31 July 2014.

== Super League ==
=== Beijing Guoan ===
In:

No.	Pos.	Nation	Player
21	FW	SWE	Erton Fejzullahu (loan from (Sweden) Djurgårdens IF)
27	FW	MNE	Dejan Damjanović (from Jiangsu Sainty)
30	DF	CHN	Lei Tenglong (loan return from (Portugal) Marítimo)
35	MF	CHN	Li Tixiang (loan return from (Portugal) Tondela)
-	DF	HKG	Lee Chi Ho (loan return from (Hong Kong) South China)
-	FW	SRB	Andrija Kaluđerović (loan return from (Cyprus) AEL Limassol)

Out:

No.	Pos.	Nation	Player
8	MF	ECU	Joffre Guerrón (to (Mexico) Tigres UANL)
15	FW	NGA	Peter Utaka (loan to Shanghai Shenxin)
43	DF	CHN	Liu Guangxu (Released)
50	DF	CHN	Li Lei (to Guangzhou R&F)
-	DF	HKG	Lee Chi Ho (to (Hong Kong) Eastern Salon)
-	FW	SRB	Andrija Kaluđerović (to (Switzerland) FC Thun)

=== Changchun Yatai ===
In:

No.	Pos.	Nation	Player
10	MF	HUN	Szabolcs Huszti (from (Germany) Hannover 96)
27	FW	CHN	Yang Xu (loan from Shandong Luneng)
31	DF	CHN	Zhao Peng (loan from Guangzhou Evergrande)
37	MF	CHN	Feng Renliang (loan from Guangzhou Evergrande)
62	DF	CHN	Cui Lin (from Shenyang Zhongze)

Out:

No.	Pos.	Nation	Player
7	MF	CHN	Jiang Pengxiang (Retired)
11	FW	BRA	Rafael Coelho (to (Thailand) Buriram United)
22	MF	CHN	Li Shang (loan to Lijiang Jiayunhao)
24	MF	CHN	Chen Liansheng (loan to Jiangxi Liansheng)
25	MF	CHN	Che Kai (loan to Dalian Transcendence)
32	DF	CHN	Li Guang (loan to Lijiang Jiayunhao)

=== Dalian Aerbin ===
In:

No.	Pos.	Nation	Player
35	FW	ARG	Esteban Solari (from (Greece) Skoda Xanthi)

Out:

No.	Pos.	Nation	Player
4	DF	CHN	Li Xuepeng (to Guangzhou Evergrande)
9	FW	CRO	Leon Benko (to (Bosnia and Herzegovina) FK Sarajevo)
17	MF	CHN	Quan Heng (Released)
20	MF	CHN	Yu Hanchao (to Guangzhou Evergrande)

=== Guangzhou Evergrande ===
In:

No.	Pos.	Nation	Player
15	GK	CHN	Dong Chunyu (loan return from Shenyang Zhongze)
26	MF	CHN	Yu Hanchao (from Dalian Aerbin)
35	DF	CHN	Li Xuepeng (from Dalian Aerbin)
38	FW	ITA	Alberto Gilardino (from (Italy) Genoa)
-	MF	BRA	Renato Cajá (loan return from (Turkey) Bursaspor)
-	MF	CHN	Ju Feng (from Guangzhou R&F)

Out:

No.	Pos.	Nation	Player
4	DF	CHN	Zhao Peng (loan to Changchun Yatai)
11	FW	BRA	Muriqui (to (Qatar) Al Sadd SC)
14	MF	CHN	Feng Renliang (loan to Changchun Yatai)
21	DF	CHN	Peng Xinli (loan to Meizhou Kejia)
30	FW	CHN	Yang Chaosheng (loan to Liaoning Whowin)
40	DF	CHN	Hu Bowen (loan to Hangzhou Greentown)
59	DF	CHN	Li Jianbin (loan to Henan Jianye)
60	MF	CHN	Qin Sheng (to Meizhou Kejia)
-	DF	CHN	Huang Jiaqiang (to Jiangxi Liansheng)
-	MF	BRA	Renato Cajá (to (Brazil) Ponte Preta)

=== Guangzhou R&F ===
In:

No.	Pos.	Nation	Player
25	FW	NGA	Aaron Samuel Olanare (from (Norway) Sarpsborg 08)
35	FW	CHN	Min Junlin (Free Agent)
62	DF	CHN	Li Lei (from Beijing Guoan)

Out:

No.	Pos.	Nation	Player
13	MF	CHN	Wu Wei'an (loan to Guangdong Sunray Cave)
27	FW	DEN	Ken Ilsø (Released)
28	DF	CHN	Gao Jiulong (loan to Nanjing Qianbao)
42	DF	CHN	Zeng Chao (loan to Guangdong Sunray Cave)
48	DF	CHN	Hu Yongfa (to Shanghai Shenxin)
52	MF	CHN	Liang Yanfeng (loan to Nanjing Qianbao)
57	FW	CHN	Wen Chao (loan to Yinchuan Helanshan)
58	MF	CHN	Ju Feng (to Guangzhou Evergrande)

=== Guizhou Renhe ===
In:

No.	Pos.	Nation	Player
24	FW	GER	Mike Hanke (from (Germany) SC Freiburg)

Out:

No.	Pos.	Nation	Player
9	FW	BIH	Zlatan Muslimović (Released)
19	DF	CHN	Liu Tianqi (loan to Taiyuan Zhongyou Jiayi)
27	FW	CHN	Qu Bo (to Qingdao Hainiu)
29	MF	CHN	Yang Hao (to Jiangsu Sainty)

=== Hangzhou Greentown ===
In:

No.	Pos.	Nation	Player
38	DF	CHN	Hu Bowen (loan from Guangzhou Evergrande)

Out:

No.	Pos.	Nation	Player
3	DF	CHN	Sun Zheng'ao (loan to B.I.T)
36	MF	CHN	Yang Zezhi (loan to Guizhou Zhicheng)
52	DF	CHN	Wang Hongyou (loan to Dalian Transcendence)

=== Harbin Yiteng ===
In:

No.	Pos.	Nation	Player
36	MF	KOR	Choi Hyun-yeon (from (South Korea) Gyeongnam FC)
39	MF	CHN	Yan Xiangchuang (Free Agent)
45	MF	CHN	Ji Xiaoxuan (from Shanghai SIPG)
-	FW	ROU	Dorin Goga (from (Georgia (country)) Dinamo Tbilisi)

Out:

No.	Pos.	Nation	Player
3	DF	KOR	Noh Hyung-Goo (Released)
28	FW	CHN	Tan Long (to (United States) Arizona United)
-	FW	ROU	Dorin Goga (to (Romania) ASA Târgu Mureș)

=== Henan Jianye ===
In:

No.	Pos.	Nation	Player
15	MF	CHN	He Bin (loan return from Chengdu Tiancheng)
21	DF	CHN	Li Zhaonan (loan return from Hunan Billows)
36	DF	CHN	Li Jianbin (loan from Guangzhou Evergrande)
61	DF	CHN	Luo Heng (loan return from Sichuan Leaders)

Out:

No.	Pos.	Nation	Player

=== Jiangsu Sainty ===
In:

No.	Pos.	Nation	Player
37	MF	CHN	Yang Hao (from Guizhou Renhe)
40	FW	COL	Edinson Toloza (from (Colombia) Junior F.C.)

Out:

No.	Pos.	Nation	Player
4	DF	CHN	Ai Zhibo (to Wuhan Zall)
10	FW	MNE	Dejan Damjanović (to Beijing Guoan)
14	MF	CHN	Yin Lu (to Taiyuan Zhongyou Jiayi)
34	FW	CHN	Qu Cheng (loan to Jiangxi Liansheng)

=== Liaoning Whowin ===
In:

No.	Pos.	Nation	Player
26	FW	CHN	Yang Chaosheng (loan from Guangzhou Evergrande)
28	DF	AUS	Josh Mitchell (from (Australia) Newcastle Jets)
38	FW	NGA	Derick Ogbu (from (Romania) CFR Cluj)

Out:

No.	Pos.	Nation	Player
14	MF	AUS	Billy Celeski (to (Australia) Newcastle Jets)
16	DF	UZB	Artyom Filiposyan (to (Uzbekistan) Lokomotiv Tashkent)
19	MF	CHN	Qu Xiaohui (Released)
39	DF	CHN	Zhang Yonghai (loan to Chengdu Tiancheng)
58	MF	CHN	Zhang Xiaoyu (loan to Nanjing Qianbao)

=== Shandong Luneng ===
In:

No.	Pos.	Nation	Player
43	FW	CHN	Cheng Yuan (loan return from (Portugal) S.C. Covilhã)
45	MF	CHN	Cui Wei (loan return from (Portugal) GS Loures)
46	DF	CHN	Wu Haoran (loan return from (Portugal) GS Loures)
49	MF	CHN	Qi Tianyu (loan return from (Portugal) Casa Pia)
50	DF	CHN	Wang Jiong (loan return from (Portugal) Casa Pia)
-	MF	CHN	Shi Hanchen (loan return from Qingdao Hainiu)

Out:

No.	Pos.	Nation	Player
2	DF	CHN	Liu Jindong (Retired)
7	MF	CHN	Cui Peng (loan to Chengdu Tiancheng)
18	FW	CHN	Yang Xu (loan to Changchun Yatai)
27	MF	CHN	Luo Senwen (loan to Chengdu Tiancheng)
-	MF	CHN	Shi Hanchen (to Hebei Zhongji)

=== Shanghai Greenland ===
In:

No.	Pos.	Nation	Player
31	FW	BRA	Paulo Henrique (from (Turkey) Trabzonspor)
34	FW	ARG	Lucas Viatri (from (Argentina) Boca Juniors)

Out:

No.	Pos.	Nation	Player
2	DF	CHN	Xiong Fei (loan to Wuhan Zall)
9	FW	COL	Luis Carlos Ruiz (to (Colombia) Atlético Nacional)
11	FW	SYR	Firas Al-Khatib (to (Kuwait) Al-Arabi SC)
56	DF	CHN	Cui Qi (loan to Tianjin Locomotive)
58	FW	CHN	Wang Junchao (loan to Pu'er Wanhao)

=== Shanghai Shenxin ===
In:

No.	Pos.	Nation	Player
35	FW	NGA	Peter Utaka (loan from Beijing Guoan)
36	FW	BRA	Everton (Free Agent)
38	DF	CHN	Hu Yongfa (from Guangzhou R&F)
39	MF	CHN	Jia Tianzi (from (Portugal) S.C. Covilhã)

Out:

No.	Pos.	Nation	Player
3	DF	CHN	Zhao Zuojun (to Taiyuan Zhongyou Jiayi)
10	FW	BRA	Kieza (loan to (Brazil) Bahia)
11	FW	MNE	Radomir Đalović (to (Thailand) BEC Tero Sasana)
12	DF	CHN	Liao Chengjian (loan to Shijiazhuang Yongchang)

=== Shanghai SIPG ===
In:

No.	Pos.	Nation	Player
19	FW	SWE	Imad Khalili (from (Sweden) Helsingborgs IF)
-	FW	AUS	Bernie Ibini-Isei (loan return from (Australia) Central Coast Mariners)

Out:

No.	Pos.	Nation	Player
17	MF	CHN	Ji Xiaoxuan (to Harbin Yiteng)
-	FW	AUS	Bernie Ibini-Isei (loan to (Australia) Sydney FC)

=== Tianjin Teda ===
In:

No.	Pos.	Nation	Player
34	MF	CHN	Wang Qiuming (loan return from Tianjin Huaruide)
-	FW	CHN	Fan Zhiqiang (loan return from Tianjin Huaruide)
-	DF	CHN	Jiang Weipeng (loan return from Tianjin Huaruide)
-	DF	CHN	Zhao Yingjie (loan return from Tianjin Huaruide)

Out:

No.	Pos.	Nation	Player
22	MF	CHN	Chu Jinzhao (loan to Yinchuan Helanshan)
-	FW	CHN	Fan Zhiqiang (loan to Dalian Transcendence)
-	DF	CHN	Jiang Weipeng (loan to Jiangxi Liansheng)
-	DF	CHN	Zhao Yingjie (loan to Lijiang Jiayunhao)

== League One ==
=== Beijing Baxy ===
In:

No.	Pos.	Nation	Player
33	FW	HKG	Godfred Karikari (from Shenzhen Ruby)
40	FW	BIH	Ivan Božić (from (Croatia) Hrvatski Dragovoljac)

Out:

No.	Pos.	Nation	Player
9	FW	URU	Julián Lalinde (to (Argentina) Ferro Carril)

=== Beijing Technology ===
In:

No.	Pos.	Nation	Player
15	DF	CHN	Sun Zheng'ao (loan from Hangzhou Greentown)
30	FW	URU	Martín Colombo (from (Uruguay) Plaza Colonia)

Out:

No.	Pos.	Nation	Player
2	DF	CHN	Liu Lijia (Retired)
9	FW	BRA	Marcos Neves (Released)

=== Chengdu Tiancheng ===
In:

No.	Pos.	Nation	Player
18	MF	CHN	Yao Xia (Free Agent)
37	MF	CHN	Cui Peng (loan from Shandong Luneng)
38	FW	BRA	Caíque (loan from (South Korea) Ulsan Hyundai)
39	MF	CHN	Luo Senwen (loan from Shandong Luneng)
40	DF	CHN	Zhang Yonghai (loan from Liaoning Whowin)

Out:

No.	Pos.	Nation	Player
9	FW	ALG	Salim Arrache (Released)
23	MF	CHN	He Bin (loan return to Henan Jianye)
25	FW	CHN	Wei Chao (loan to Shenzhen Ruby)

=== Chongqing Lifan ===
In:

No.	Pos.	Nation	Player
15	DF	BRA	Luiz Eduardo (from (Brazil) CA Bragantino)

Out:

No.	Pos.	Nation	Player
10	FW	BRA	Lincoln (Released)
43	MF	CHN	Li Tianchen (to Hunan Billows)

=== Guangdong Sunray Cave ===
In:

No.	Pos.	Nation	Player
25	FW	URU	Danilo Peinado (from Wuhan Zall)
29	MF	CHN	Wu Wei'an (loan from Guangzhou R&F)
31	DF	CHN	Zeng Chao (loan from Guangzhou R&F)

Out:

No.	Pos.	Nation	Player
10	FW	BIH	Petar Jelic (to (Serbia) FK Rad)
18	MF	CHN	Zhang Yong (to Taiyuan Zhongyou Jiayi)

=== Hebei Zhongji ===
In:

No.	Pos.	Nation	Player
36	FW	CHN	Wang Yang (Free Agent)
39	FW	ANG	Givestin N'Suki (Free Agent)
61	MF	CHN	Zhang Yi (Free Agent)
62	DF	CHN	Zhan Nan (Free Agent)
63	MF	CHN	Li Haoran (Free Agent)
65	MF	CHN	Shi Hanchen (from Shandong Luneng)
66	DF	CHN	Wei Jiye (from Meixian Hakka)

Out:

No.	Pos.	Nation	Player
4	MF	URU	Martín Rodríguez (to (Uruguay) Tacuarembó F.C.)

=== Hunan Billows ===
In:

No.	Pos.	Nation	Player
61	FW	CHN	Fang Zhengyang (Free Agent)
63	MF	CHN	Li Tianchen (from Chongqing Lifan)

Out:

No.	Pos.	Nation	Player
2	DF	CHN	Li Zhaonan (loan return to Henan Jianye)

=== Qingdao Hainiu ===
In:

No.	Pos.	Nation	Player
23	FW	CHN	Qu Bo (from Guizhou Renhe)
31	GK	CHN	Liu Peng (Free Agent)

Out:

No.	Pos.	Nation	Player
45	MF	CHN	Shi Hanchen (loan return to Shandong Luneng)

=== Qingdao Jonoon ===
In:

No.	Pos.	Nation	Player
66	MF	CHN	Han Sipei (Free Agent)

Out:

No.	Pos.	Nation	Player
3	DF	CHN	Jiao Zhe (to Taiyuan Zhongyou Jiayi)
31	MF	CHN	Zhang Fengyu (to Shandong Tengding)
43	DF	CHN	Zheng Jianfeng (loan to Dalian Transcendence)
44	MF	CHN	Ma Leilei (loan to Meizhou Kejia)
48	DF	CHN	Wei Renjie (loan to Nanjing Qianbao)
51	DF	CHN	Zhang Yifeng (Released)
-	FW	CHN	Lu Yi (loan to Shandong Tengding)
-	MF	CHN	Xing Dong (loan to Shandong Tengding)

=== Shenyang Zhongze ===
In:

No.	Pos.	Nation	Player
32	FW	GAB	Éric Mouloungui (Free Agent)
-	DF	CHN	Yang Lei (loan return from Yinchuan Helanshan)

Out:

No.	Pos.	Nation	Player
12	GK	CHN	Dong Chunyu (loan return to Guangzhou Evergrande)
14	MF	KOR	Kim Tae-Yeon (to (South Korea) Gwangju FC)
42	DF	CHN	Cui Lin (to Changchun Yatai)
-	DF	CHN	Yang Lei (loan to Pu'er Wanhao)

=== Shenzhen Ruby ===
In:

No.	Pos.	Nation	Player
19	FW	CHN	Wei Chao (loan from Chengdu Tiancheng)
37	MF	CHN	Fei Yu (from (Portugal) Sertanense F.C.)

Out:

No.	Pos.	Nation	Player
11	FW	HKG	Godfred Karikari (to Beijing Baxy)

=== Shijiazhuang Yongchang ===
In:

No.	Pos.	Nation	Player
25	DF	CHN	Liao Chengjian (loan from Shanghai Shenxin)
33	MF	BUL	Emil Gargorov (from (Bulgaria) CSKA Sofia)

Out:

No.	Pos.	Nation	Player
6	DF	BRA	Diego Giaretta (Released)

=== Tianjin Songjiang ===
In:

No.	Pos.	Nation	Player
33	DF	CHN	Zhong Beiwei (loan return from Jiangxi Liansheng)

Out:

No.	Pos.	Nation	Player
17	MF	CHN	Cai Chuchuan (loan to Guizhou Zhicheng)
21	FW	CHN	Lian Chen (to Guizhou Zhicheng)

=== Wuhan Zall ===
In:

No.	Pos.	Nation	Player
4	DF	CHN	Ai Zhibo (from Jiangsu Sainty)
33	DF	CHN	Xiong Fei (loan from Shanghai Shenhua)
35	MF	CHN	Jin Xin (loan return from Sichuan Leaders)
36	FW	BRA	Tássio (from (Brazil) CA Bragantino)
61	MF	CHN	Zhu Cheng (loan return from Sichuan Leaders)
62	DF	CHN	Sun Gang (Free Agent)
-	MF	KOR	Cho Won-Hee (loan return from (South Korea) Gyeongnam FC)

Out:

No.	Pos.	Nation	Player
12	FW	URU	Danilo Peinado (to Guangdong Sunray Cave)
-	MF	KOR	Cho Won-Hee (to (Japan) Omiya Ardija)

=== Xinjiang Tianshan Leopard ===
In:

No.	Pos.	Nation	Player
37	MF	CHN	Huang Long (Free Agent)
38	FW	CRC	Allan Alemán (Free Agent)

Out:

No.	Pos.	Nation	Player
10	FW	CPV	Dady (to (Portugal) Atlético CP)

=== Yanbian Changbaishan ===
In:

No.	Pos.	Nation	Player
31	MF	CHN	Liu Chun (Free Agent)
40	FW	CIV	Serge Roland (from (Democratic Republic of the Congo) Sanga Balende)

Out:

No.	Pos.	Nation	Player
23	DF	KOR	Won Tae-Yeon (loan return to (South Korea) Gyeongnam FC)
