= 2014 China League One =

China League One
- Season: 2014
- Champions: Chongqing Lifan
- Promoted: Chongqing Lifan; Shijiazhuang Yongchang
- Relegated: None
- Matches: 240
- Goals: 611 (2.55 per match)
- Top goalscorer: (Brazil) Guto (21 goals)
- Biggest home win: Qingdao Jonoon 5–0 Chengdu Tiancheng (May 3rd, 2014) (5 goals)
- Biggest away win: Yanbian Changbaishan 1–5 Beijing BIT (May 10th, 2014) (4 goals)
- Highest scoring: Qingdao Hainiu 4–4 Tianjin Songjiang (Aug. 30th, 2014); Guangdong Sunray Cave 5–3 Shenzhen Ruby (Oct. 5th, 2014) (8 goals)
- Longest winning run: Chongqing Lifan (7 matches)
- Longest unbeaten run: Chongqing Lifan (27 matches)
- Longest winless run: Chengdu Tiancheng; Qingdao Hainiu (13 matches)
- Longest losing run: Qingdao Hainiu (9 matches)
- Highest attendance: 29,880; Chongqing Lifan 2–2 Guangdong Sunray Cave (Oct. 18th, 2014)
- Lowest attendance: 68; Beijing BIT 3–1 Xinjiang Tianshan Leopard (Jun. 1st, 2014)
- Average attendance: 5,334

The 2014 China League One is the 11th season of the China League One, the second tier of the Chinese football league pyramid, since its establishment in 2004.

== Teams ==
=== Team changes ===
==== To League One ====
Teams relegated from 2013 Chinese Super League

- Qingdao Jonoon
- Wuhan Zall

Teams promoted from 2013 China League Two

- Qingdao Hainiu
- Hebei Zhongji

==== From League One ====
Teams promoted to 2014 Chinese Super League

- Henan Jianye
- Harbin Yiteng

Teams relegated to 2014 China League Two

- Chongqing F.C.
- Guizhou Zhicheng

=== Name changes ===
- Chengdu Blades changed their name to Chengdu Tiancheng in December 2013.
- Shenyang Shenbei changed their name to Shenyang Zhongze in January 2014.
- Yanbian Changbai Tiger changed their name to Yanbian Changbaishan in February 2014.
- Hubei China-Kyle moved to the city of Ürümqi and changed their name to Xinjiang Tianshan Leopard in February 2014.
- Shijiazhuang Yongchang Junhao changed their name to Shijiazhuang Yongchang in February 2014.

== Clubs ==
=== Stadiums and Locations ===
Club	Head coach	City	Stadium	Capacity	2013 season
Qingdao Jonoon ^{R}	(Slovenia) Tomaž Kavčič	Qingdao	Qingdao Tiantai Stadium	20,525	CSL, 15th
Wuhan Zall ^{R}	(China) Zheng Bin (caretaker)	Wuhan	Xinhua Road Sports Center	32,137	CSL, 16th
Guangdong Sunray Cave	(China) Mai Chao	Guangzhou	Huangpu Sports Center	12,000	3rd
Chongqing Lifan	(China) Wang Baoshan	Chongqing	Chongqing Olympic Sports Center	58,680	4th
Shenzhen Ruby	(China) Li Yi (caretaker)	Shenzhen	Bao'an Stadium	40,000	5th
Shenyang Zhongze	(China) Li Zheng (caretaker)	Shenyang	Shenyang Olympic Sports Center Stadium	60,000	6th
Beijing Baxy	(Croatia) Goran Tomić	Beijing	Chaoyang Sports Centre	8,000	7th
Shijiazhuang Yongchang	(Bulgaria) Yasen Petrov	Shijiazhuang	Yutong International Sports Center	38,000	8th
Beijing BIT	(China) Yuan Wei	Beijing	BIT Eastern Athletic Field	5,000	9th
Tianjin Songjiang	(Portugal) Manuel Cajuda	Tianjin	Tianjin Tuanbo Football Stadium	30,320	10th
Yanbian Changbaishan	(China) Gao Zhongxun	Yanji	Yanji Nationwide Fitness Centre Stadium	30,000	11th
Hunan Billows	(China) Huang Cheng	Changsha	CSU New Stadium; Yiyang Olympic Sports Park Stadium	18,000; 30,000	12th
Xinjiang Tianshan Leopard	(China) Li Jun	Ürümqi	Xinjiang Sports Centre	50,000	13th
Chengdu Tiancheng	(South Korea) Lee Jang-soo	Chengdu (playing in Shuangliu and Dujiangyan)	Shuangliu Sports Centre; Dujiangyan Phoenix Stadium	26,000; 12,700	14th
Qingdao Hainiu ^{P}	(China) Su Maozhen	Qingdao	Conson Stadium	45,000	CL2, 1st
Hebei Zhongji ^{P}	(Uruguay) Alejandro Larrea	Shijiazhuang	Yutong International Sports Center	38,000	CL2, 2nd

Location of teams in 2014 China League One

=== Managerial changes ===
Team	Outgoing manager	Manner of departure	Date of vacancy	Table	Incoming manager	Date of appointment
Shenzhen Ruby	(France) Philippe Troussier	Expiration of contract	6 November 2013	N/A	(China) Li Yi (caretaker)	7 November 2013
Qingdao Jonoon	(Serbia) Goran Stevanović	Sacked	7 November 2013	N/A	(China) Li Xiaopeng	26 December 2013
Yanbian Changbaishan	(China) Li Guanghao (caretaker)	—	22 November 2013	N/A	(China) Li Huen	22 November 2013
Wuhan Zall	(China) Wang Jun (caretaker)	—	11 December 2013	N/A	(Croatia) Dražen Besek	11 December 2013
Shijiazhuang Yongchang	(China) Li Shubin	Expiration of contract	12 December 2013	N/A	(Bulgaria) Yasen Petrov	12 December 2013
Chengdu Tiancheng	(China) Yao Xia (caretaker)	—	16 December 2013	N/A	(China) Niu Hongli	16 December 2013
Hebei Zhongji	(China) Huang Yang	—	25 December 2013	N/A	(Uruguay) Nelson Agresta	26 December 2013
Tianjin Songjiang	(China) Pei Encai	Expiration of contract	31 December 2013	N/A	(Italy) Gianni Bortoletto	15 March 2014
Guangdong Sunray Cave	(China) Zhang Jun	Sacked	2 January 2014	N/A	(Chile) Julio César Moreno	2 January 2014
Guangdong Sunray Cave	(Chile) Julio César Moreno	Sacked	20 April 2014	14th	(China) Feng Feng (caretaker)	20 April 2014
Chengdu Tiancheng	(China) Niu Hongli	Sacked	22 April 2014	16th	(China) Yu Fei (caretaker)	22 April 2014
Yanbian Changbaishan	(China) Li Huen	Sacked	10 May 2014	16th	(China) Li Guanghao	10 May 2014
Shenyang Zhongze	(China) Li Jinyu	Sacked	12 May 2014	12th	(China) Li Zheng (caretaker)	12 May 2014
Guangdong Sunray Cave	(China) Feng Feng (caretaker)	—	13 May 2014	15th	(China) Mai Chao	13 May 2014
Tianjin Songjiang	(Italy) Gianni Bortoletto	Sacked	14 June 2014	9th	(Portugal) Manuel Cajuda	23 June 2014
Chengdu Tiancheng	(China) Yu Fei (caretaker)	—	6 July 2014	16th	(South Korea) Lee Jang-soo	6 July 2014
Qingdao Jonoon	(China) Li Xiaopeng	Resigned	20 July 2014	6th	(Slovenia) Tomaž Kavčič	22 July 2014
Hebei Zhongji	(Uruguay) Nelson Agresta	Sacked	14 August 2014	13th	(Uruguay) Alejandro Larrea	14 August 2014
Wuhan Zall	(Croatia) Dražen Besek	Sacked	30 August 2014	3rd	(China) Zheng Bin (caretaker)	30 August 2014
Yanbian Changbaishan	(China) Li Guanghao	Resigned	6 September 2014	16th	(China) Gao Zhongxun	8 September 2014

=== Foreign players ===
Restricting the number of foreign players strictly to three per CL1 team. A team could use three foreign players on the field each game. Players came from Hong Kong, Macau and Chinese Taipei were deemed as native players in CL1.

- Foreign players who left their clubs after first half of the season.

Club	Player 1	Player 2	Player 3	Former Players*
Beijing Baxy	(Bosnia and Herzegovina) Ivan Božić	(Brazil) Felipe Félix	(Romania) Lucian Goian	(Uruguay) Julián Lalinde
Beijing BIT	(Uruguay) Martín Colombo	(Uruguay) Julio Gutiérrez	(Uruguay) Abel Nazario	(Brazil) Marcos Neves
Chengdu Tiancheng	(Brazil) Caíque	(Brazil) Matheus	(Guadeloupe) Brice Jovial	(Algeria) Salim Arrache
Chongqing Lifan	(Brazil) Luiz Eduardo	(Brazil) Elias	(Brazil) Guto	(Brazil) Lincom
Guangdong Sunray Cave	(Cameroon) Mahama Awal	(Uruguay) Carlos Andrés García	(Uruguay) Danilo Peinado	(Bosnia and Herzegovina) Petar Jelić
Hebei Zhongji	(Angola) Givestin N'Suki	(Uruguay) Andrés Fernández	(Uruguay) Andrés Márquez	(Uruguay) Martín Rodríguez
Hunan Billows	(Colombia) Luis Carlos Cabezas	(Serbia) Stevan Bates	(Serbia) Jovan Damjanović	
Qingdao Hainiu	(Cameroon) Yves Ekwalla Herman	(Central African Republic) Kelly Youga	(Estonia) Vladimir Voskoboinikov	
Qingdao Jonoon	(Costa Rica) Mauricio Castillo	(Honduras) Osman Chávez	(Romania) Cristian Dănălache	
Shenyang Zhongze	(Brazil) José Duarte	(Gabon) Éric Mouloungui	(Serbia) Zoran Rendulić	(South Korea) Kim Tae-yeon
Shenzhen Ruby	(Brazil) Bruno Coutinho	(Italy) Giuseppe Aquaro	(Senegal) Babacar Gueye	
Shijiazhuang Yongchang	(Brazil) Carlão	(Bulgaria) Emil Gargorov	(Bulgaria) Georgi Iliev	(Brazil) Diego Giaretta
Tianjin Songjiang	(Brazil) Mário Lúcio	(Brazil) Nei	(Colombia) Juan Andrés Bolaños	
Wuhan Zall	(Brazil) Tássio	(Senegal) Jacques Faty	(Uruguay) Sergio Leal	(Uruguay) Danilo Peinado
Xinjiang Tianshan Leopard	(Brazil) Vicente	(Costa Rica) Allan Alemán	(Costa Rica) Johnny Woodly	(Cape Verde) Dady
Yanbian Changbaishan	(Ivory Coast) Serge Roland	(South Korea) Kim Do-hyung	(South Korea) Kim Ki-soo	(South Korea) Won Tae-yeon

Hong Kong/Macau/Taiwan players (doesn't count on the foreign player slot)

Club	Player 1	Player 2	Player 3
Beijing Baxy	(Chinese Taipei) Chen Hao-wei	(Chinese Taipei) Wen Chih-hao	(Hong Kong) Godfred Karikari
Hunan Billows	(Hong Kong) Andy Nägelein		
Shenyang Zhongze	(Hong Kong) Fong Pak Lun	(Hong Kong) Li Ngai Hoi	
Shijiazhuang Yongchang	(Hong Kong) Bai He		
Tianjin Songjiang	(Hong Kong) Ng Wai Chiu		

== League table ==
Pos	Team	Pld	W	D	L	GF	GA	GD	Pts	Promotion or relegation
1	Chongqing Lifan (P, C)	30	17	10	3	60	24	+36	61	Promotion to 2015 CSL
2	Shijiazhuang Yongchang (P)	30	17	6	7	42	25	+17	57 (Note: Wuhan 1–0 Shijiazhuang; Shijiazhuang 2–0 Wuhan)	Promotion to 2015 CSL
3	Wuhan Zall	30	18	3	9	46	31	+15	57	
4	Beijing Baxy	30	14	13	3	45	27	+18	55	
5	Qingdao Jonoon	30	15	8	7	43	29	+14	46 (Note: On 14 August 2014, Qingdao Jonoon were deducted 7 points for being found to have falsified in the contract dispute of Liu Jian with Guangzhou Evergrande.)	
6	Hunan Billows	30	12	9	9	38	33	+5	45	
7	Tianjin Songjiang	30	12	7	11	39	33	+6	43	
8	Shenzhen Ruby	30	9	10	11	35	38	−3	37 (Note: BIT 1–3 Shenzhen; Shenzhen 1–3 BIT)	
9	Beijing BIT	30	11	4	15	46	57	−11	37	
10	Xinjiang Tianshan Leopard	30	8	11	11	29	33	−4	35 (Note: Shenyang 0–0 Xinjiang; Xinjiang 1–0 Shenyang)	
11	Shenyang Zhongze	30	8	11	11	27	30	−3	35	Disbanded after season
12	Qingdao Hainiu	30	7	10	13	36	47	−11	31	
13	Guangdong Sunray Cave	30	6	12	12	36	47	−11	30	Disbanded after season
14	Hebei Zhongji	30	6	11	13	31	54	−23	29	
15	Chengdu Tiancheng	30	6	8	16	29	45	−16	26	Disbanded after season
16	Yanbian Changbaishan	30	3	9	18	29	58	−29	18	

Updated to match(es) played on November 1, 2014. Source: CL1 website on hupu.com (in Chinese)
Rules for classification: 1) points; 2) goal difference; 3) number of goals scored; 4) head-to-head goals scored; 5) goal difference; 6) goals scored; 7) disciplinary points (1 point for each yellow card, 3 points for each red card). Head-to-Head: Only used at the end of the season when two or more teams need the head-to-head rules to break a tie.
(C) Champions; (P) Promoted

== Results ==
Home \ Away	QD	WH	GD	CQL	SZ	SYZ	BJB	SJZ	BJT	TJS	YB	HUN	XJT	CD	QDH	HBZ
Qingdao Jonoon		3–0	2–1	0–3	3–1	1–1	0–1	1–0	2–1	1–0	1–1	1–0	1–1	5–0	1–0	4–1
Wuhan Zall	2–3		4–0	2–0	1–1	1–0	2–3	1–0	3–1	1–2	1–0	2–0	2–0	1–0	1–1	1–0
Guangdong Sunray Cave	1–1	0–1		0–2	5–3	1–1	2–1	0–2	1–2	3–2	4–1	1–1	0–1	2–2	1–0	2–2
Chongqing Lifan	1–0	3–0	2–2		4–2	1–1	0–1	1–1	4–0	2–0	5–1	1–2	0–0	4–1	1–0	4–0
Shenzhen Ruby	2–1	2–0	1–1	1–1		2–1	0–0	2–3	1–3	0–0	1–0	1–0	0–0	2–0	0–0	4–1
Shenyang Zhongze	1–2	1–2	0–0	0–1	1–2		1–1	0–0	2–0	0–0	2–0	1–1	0–0	1–0	1–0	3–0
Beijing Baxy	0–0	1–1	1–0	2–2	2–1	1–2		4–1	2–2	1–0	0–0	3–1	1–1	1–0	1–1	0–0
Shijiazhuang Yongchang	1–0	2–0	2–1	2–3	1–0	1–0	2–0		0–2	0–0	2–0	3–0	1–0	2–2	3–2	3–0
Beijing BIT	3–1	2–0	1–1	0–3	1–3	0–1	1–1	1–3		1–0	2–4	0–2	3–1	1–0	2–1	3–2
Tianjin Songjiang	1–2	0–2	3–0	2–2	1–0	2–1	1–2	0–1	2–1		2–1	3–2	2–0	1–0	4–0	3–1
Yanbian Changbaishan	2–2	1–4	2–1	1–3	0–0	0–0	1–1	1–2	1–5	1–1		1–2	1–0	2–2	2–2	0–1
Hunan Billows	3–0	2–1	0–0	0–0	2–0	3–1	0–3	0–0	4–1	2–1	3–2		0–0	0–0	3–0	1–1
Xinjiang Tianshan Leopard	1–1	1–2	1–1	1–1	0–0	1–0	2–4	1–0	5–2	2–1	3–1	1–2		1–0	0–1	4–1
Chengdu Tiancheng	0–1	0–2	2–2	1–4	2–0	0–1	1–2	0–0	2–1	0–1	2–1	3–1	4–1		1–2	1–1
Qingdao Hainiu	0–0	2–3	1–2	1–1	2–2	5–1	0–3	1–4	3–2	4–4	2–0	1–0	1–0	1–1		2–2
Hebei Zhongji	0–3	0–3	3–1	0–1	2–1	2–2	2–2	2–0	2–2	0–0	2–1	1–1	0–0	1–2	1–0	

Updated to match(es) played on Nov. 1st, 2014. Source: Results on sina.com
Legend: Blue = home team win; Yellow = draw; Red = away team win.

== Positions by round ==
Team ╲ Round	1	2	3	4	5	6	7	8	9	10	11	12	13	14	15	16	17	18	19	20	21	22	23	24	25	26	27	28	29	30
Chongqing Lifan	13	15	10	6	6	4	4	5	3	2	2	1	1	1	1	1	1	1	1	1	1	1	1	1	1	1	1	1	1	1
Shijiazhuang Yongchang	3	1	3	2	2	2	2	1	1	1	1	3	3	3	2	2	2	2	2	2	2	3	2	2	2	2	2	2	2	2
Wuhan Zall	13	16	13	15	10	6	5	4	5	5	3	4	4	4	5	4	3	3	4	3	3	2	3	3	3	3	3	3	3	3
Beijing Baxy	11	5	2	4	4	3	3	3	4	3	4	2	2	2	3	3	4	4	3	4	4	4	4	4	4	4	4	4	4	4
Qingdao Jonoon	7	11	9	5	8	12	12	9	9	8	9	9	8	8	6	7	7	6	7	7	7	6	6	5	5	5	5	5	5	5
Hunan Billows	1	2	1	1	1	1	1	2	2	4	5	5	7	5	4	5	5	5	5	5	5	5	5	6	6	6	7	6	7	6
Tianjin Songjiang	1	8	11	14	11	5	7	6	8	9	8	8	9	9	9	9	9	9	9	8	8	8	7	7	7	7	6	7	6	7
Shenzhen Ruby	15	6	6	8	5	8	8	8	6	6	7	6	5	6	7	8	8	8	8	9	9	9	10	10	9	9	8	9	8	8
Beijing BIT	15	6	12	10	13	11	11	13	10	13	13	10	10	10	11	11	12	12	12	11	11	11	11	11	12	11	12	12	11	9
Xinjiang Tianshan Leopard	7	12	7	9	9	13	13	12	13	12	11	12	13	11	10	10	10	10	10	10	10	10	9	9	10	12	9	8	9	10
Shenyang Zhongze	3	3	4	7	7	10	10	11	12	11	12	13	12	13	14	13	11	11	11	12	12	12	12	12	11	10	11	10	10	11
Qingdao Hainiu	7	4	5	3	3	7	6	7	7	7	6	7	6	6	8	6	6	7	6	6	6	7	8	8	8	8	10	11	12	12
Guangdong Sunray Cave	5	10	15	13	15	14	15	15	15	14	14	14	14	14	12	14	14	14	14	14	14	13	14	14	14	14	13	13	13	13
Hebei Zhongji	5	9	14	12	12	9	9	10	11	10	10	11	11	12	13	12	13	13	13	13	13	15	13	13	13	13	14	14	14	14
Chengdu Tiancheng	7	13	8	11	14	16	14	14	14	15	15	16	16	16	16	16	15	15	16	16	15	14	15	15	15	15	15	15	15	15
Yanbian Changbaishan	11	14	16	16	16	15	16	16	16	16	16	15	15	15	15	15	16	16	15	15	16	16	16	16	16	16	16	16	16	16

Winner; promoted to Chinese Super League
Runner-up; promoted to Chinese Super League
Disbanded after season

Source: Table by round (in Chinese)

== Top scorers ==
Rank	Player	Club	Total
1	(Brazil) Guto	Chongqing Lifan	21
2	(China) Wang Dong	Chongqing Lifan	16
2	(Costa Rica) Johnny Woodly	Xinjiang Tianshan Leopard	16
2	(Senegal) Babacar Gueye	Shenzhen Ruby	16
5	(China) Li Xiang	Beijing BIT	15
5	(Colombia) Luis Carlos Cabezas	Hunan Billows	15
7	(Guadeloupe) Brice Jovial	Chengdu Tiancheng	13
7	(Uruguay) Andrés Márquez	Hebei Zhongji	13
9	(Brazil) Felipe Félix	Beijing Baxy	12
10	(Uruguay) Sergio Leal	Wuhan Zall	11

Source: sports.sina.com (in Chinese)

== Awards ==
The awards of 2014 China League One were announced on 21 December 2014.

- Most valuable player: (China) Wang Dong (Chongqing Lifan)
- Top scorer: (Brazil) Guto (Chongqing Lifan)
- Best goalkeeper: (China) Wang Guoming (Shijiazhuang Yongchang)
- Best coach: (Croatia) Goran Tomić (Beijing Baxy)

== League Attendance ==
Pos	Team	Total	High	Low	Average	Change
1	Chongqing Lifan	198,814	29,880	7,329	13,254	+386.4%
2	Shijiazhuang Yongchang	179,231	22,317	7,617	11,949	+18.9%
3	Wuhan Zall^{†}	126,849	13,613	3,126	8,457	−41.3%
4	Yanbian Changbaishan	119,875	18,975	876	7,992	+64.9%
5	Hebei Zhongji^{‡}	93,583	12,244	2,412	6,239	n/a
6	Shenyang Zhongze	92,338	11,828	1,082	6,156	+493.1%
7	Shenzhen Ruby	90,171	8,791	3,033	6,011	−9.8%
8	Hunan Billows	77,539	13,662	1,321	5,169	+10.7%
9	Qingdao Hainiu^{‡}	63,434	15,624	1,234	4,229	n/a
10	Qingdao Jonoon^{†}	54,033	7,316	2,014	3,602	−56.5%
11	Xinjiang Tianshan Leopard	47,416	12,500	351	3,161	+43.3%
12	Tianjin Songjiang	37,659	7,800	512	2,511	+11.7%
13	Chengdu Tiancheng	28,867	4,210	523	1,924	−46.4%
14	Beijing Baxy	25,017	3,000	520	1,668	−26.5%
15	Beijing BIT	24,550	2,375	68	1,637	−8.6%
16	Guangdong Sunray Cave	20,745	3,868	348	1,383	−52.9%
	League total	1,280,121	29,880	68	5,334	+13.3%

Updated to games played on Nov. 1st, 2014
Notes:
^{†} Teams played previous season in CSL.
^{‡} Teams played previous season in CL2.
