= 2013 China League One =

China League One
- Season: 2013
- Champions: Henan Jianye
- Promoted: Henan Jianye; Harbin Yiteng
- Relegated: Chongqing F.C. Guizhou Zhicheng
- Matches: 240
- Goals: 598 (2.49 per match)
- Top goalscorer: (Senegal) Babacar Gueye (23 goals)
- Biggest home win: Shenyang Shenbei 6–0 Shenzhen Ruby (Sept. 22nd, 2013) (6 goals)
- Biggest away win: Shenyang Shenbei 0–5 Guangdong Sunray Cave (Oct. 6th, 2013) (5 goals)
- Highest scoring: Yanbian Changbai Tiger 5-4 Shenzhen Ruby (May 26th, 2013); Shenzhen Ruby 5-4 Henan Jianye (Nov. 2nd, 2013) (9 goals)
- Longest winning run: Shenyang Shenbei (7 matches)
- Longest unbeaten run: Henan Jianye (19 matches)
- Longest winless run: Guizhou Zhicheng (14 matches)
- Longest losing run: Chongqing F.C. Tianjin Songjiang (6 matches)
- Highest attendance: 22,528; Henan Jianye 2–1 Tianjin Songjiang (Oct. 26th, 2013)
- Lowest attendance: 420; Shenyang Shenbei 6–0 Shenzhen Ruby (Sept. 22nd, 2013)
- Average attendance: 4,708

The 2013 China League One is the tenth season of the China League One, the second tier of the Chinese football league pyramid, since its establishment.

== Teams ==
=== Team changes ===
==== To League One ====
Teams relegated from 2012 Chinese Super League

- Henan Jianye

Teams promoted from 2012 China League Two

- Guizhou Zhicheng
- Hubei China-Kyle

==== From League One ====
Teams promoted to 2013 Chinese Super League

- Shanghai East Asia
- Wuhan Zall

Teams relegated to 2013 China League Two

- Hohhot Dongjin

=== Name changes ===
Fujian Smart Hero moved to the city of Shijiazhuang and changed their name to Shijiazhuang Yongchang Junhao in December 2012.

Harbin Songbei Yiteng changed their name to Harbin Yiteng.

== Clubs ==
=== Stadiums and Locations ===
Club	Head coach	City	Stadium	Capacity	2012 season
Beijing Baxy	(Croatia) Goran Tomić	Beijing	Chaoyang Sports Centre	8,000	15th
Beijing BIT	(China) Yuan Wei	Beijing	BIT Eastern Athletic Field	5,000	14th
Chengdu Blades	(Belgium) Patrick Aussems	Chengdu (playing in Shuangliu)	Shuangliu Sports Centre	26,000	9th
Chongqing F.C.	(Portugal) Manuel Cajuda	Chongqing	Chongqing Olympic Sports Center	58,680	8th
Chongqing Lifan	(China) Wang Baoshan	Chongqing	Fuling Stadium	22,000	5th
Guangdong Sunray Cave	(China) Zhang Jun	Guangzhou	Guangdong Provincial People's Stadium; Century Lotus Stadium(from Round 22)	25,000; 36,686	10th
Guizhou Zhicheng ^{P}	(Netherlands) Arie Schans	Guiyang	Guizhou Provincial Stadium	18,000	CL2, 1st
Harbin Yiteng	(China) Duan Xin	Harbin	Harbin International Conference Exhibition and Sports Center	50,000	4th
Henan Jianye ^{R}	(China) Tang Yaodong	Zhengzhou	Zhengzhou Hanghai Stadium	29,860	CSL, 16th
Hubei China-Kyle ^{P}	(China) Li Jun	Huangshi	Huangshi Stadium	15,000	CL2, 2nd
Hunan Billows	(China) Huang Cheng	Changsha	Yiyang Olympic Sports Park Stadium(Round 1-6, 8, 25 & 27); Helong Stadium	30,000; 55,000	11th
Shenyang Shenbei	(China) Li Jinyu	Shenyang	Shenyang Sport University Stadium; Shenyang Olympic Sports Center Stadium (from Round 27)	12,000; 60,000	12th
Shenzhen Ruby	(France) Philippe Troussier	Shenzhen	Bao'an Stadium	40,000	7th
Shijiazhuang Yongchang Junhao	(China) Li Shubin	Shijiazhuang	Yutong International Sports Center	37,000	3rd
Tianjin Songjiang	(China) Pei Encai	Tianjin	Tianjin Tuanbo Football Stadium; Tianjin Haihe Education Park Stadium (Round 11-24)	30,320; 30,000	6th
Yanbian Changbai Tiger	(China) Li Guanghao (caretaker)	Yanji (playing in Longjing and Tumen)	Hailanjiang Stadium; Tumen Stadium (Round 13-22)	32,000; N/A	13th

Location of teams in 2013 China League One

=== Managerial changes ===
Team	Outgoing manager	Manner of departure	Date of vacancy	Table	Incoming manager	Date of appointment
Chengdu Blades	(China) Wang Baoshan	Resigned	Pre-season	N/A	(China) Yao Xia (caretaker)	Pre-season
Chongqing Lifan	(China) Tang Yaodong	Resigned	Pre-season	N/A	(China) Wang Baoshan	Pre-season
Henan Jianye	(China) Shen Xiangfu	End of contract	Pre-season	N/A	(China) Tang Yaodong	Pre-season
Hunan Billows	(China) Zhang Xu	End of contract	Pre-season	N/A	(Croatia) Dražen Besek	Pre-season
Tianjin Songjiang	(China) Hao Haitao	Sacked	Pre-season	N/A	(China) Pei Encai	Pre-season
Guangdong Sunray Cave	(China) Cao Yang (caretaker)	—	3 January 2013	N/A	(China) Zhang Jun	3 January 2013
Chengdu Blades	(China) Yao Xia (caretaker)	—	7 January 2013	N/A	(China) Hao Haitao	7 January 2013
Beijing Baxy	(China) Cao Xiandong (China) Wang Tao	—	26 February 2013	N/A	(Croatia) Goran Tomić	26 February 2013
Chengdu Blades	(China) Hao Haitao	Sacked	21 April 2013	16th	(Belgium) Patrick Aussems	21 April 2013
Chongqing F.C.	(China) Zhao Changhong	Sacked	24 April 2013	14th	(China) Jia Jin ^{1}	24 April 2013
Shenyang Shenbei	(China) Liu Zhicai	Sacked	13 May 2013	8th	(China) Li Wei (caretaker)	13 May 2013
Shijiazhuang Yongchang Junhao	(China) Xu Hui	Resigned	14 May 2013	10th	(China) Xu Tao (caretaker)	14 May 2013
Shenyang Shenbei	(China) Li Wei (caretaker)	—	25 May 2013	9th	(China) Li Jinyu	25 May 2013
Guizhou Zhicheng	(China) Yuan Yi	Resigned	27 May 2013	16th	(Netherlands) Arie Schans	28 May 2013
Shijiazhuang Yongchang Junhao	(China) Xu Tao (caretaker)	—	30 June 2013	11th	(China) Li Shubin	30 June 2013
Chongqing F.C.	(China) Jia Jin ^{1}	Resigned	9 July 2013	16th	(Portugal) Manuel Cajuda	11 July 2013
Hunan Billows	(Croatia) Dražen Besek	Sacked	25 July 2013	10th	(China) Huang Cheng (caretaker)	25 July 2013
Yanbian Changbai Tiger	(South Korea) Cho Keung-yeon	Sacked	7 August 2013	15th	(China) Li Guanghao (caretaker)	7 August 2013
Chengdu Blades	(Belgium) Patrick Aussems	Sacked	16 September 2013	16th	(China) Yao Xia (caretaker)	16 September 2013

Note1:Executive manager was Wei Xin.

=== Foreign players ===
Restricting the number of foreign players strictly to three per CL1 team. A team could use three foreign players on the field each game. Players came from Hong Kong, Macau and Chinese Taipei were deemed as native players in CL1.

- Foreign players who left their clubs after first half of the season.

Club	Player 1	Player 2	Player 3	Former Players*
Beijing Baxy	(Australia) Ryan Griffiths	(Nigeria) Stephen Makinwa	(Romania) Lucian Goian	(Slovenia) Tomislav Mišura
Beijing BIT	(Uruguay) Abel Nazario	(Uruguay) Danilo Peinado	(Uruguay) Martín Rodríguez	
Chengdu Blades	(Estonia) Raio Piiroja	(Guadeloupe) Brice Jovial	(Slovenia) Aleksander Rodić	(Bulgaria) Gerasim Zakov
Chongqing F.C.	(Brazil) Nei	(New Zealand) Chris Killen	(South Korea) Kim Tae-min	(Croatia) Stipe Lapić
Chongqing Lifan	(Bolivia) Gualberto Mojica	(Brazil) Guto	(Cameroon) Yves Ekwalla Herman	(Australia) Brendon Šantalab
Guangdong Sunray Cave	(Brazil) Dori	(Cameroon) Mahama Awal	(Uruguay) Carlos Andrés García	
Guizhou Zhicheng	(Bosnia and Herzegovina) Ivan Božić	(Canada) Mason Trafford	(Honduras) Carlo Costly	(South Korea) Lee Kil-hoon
Harbin Yiteng	(Australia) Adam Hughes	(Brazil) Rodrigo	(Colombia) Ricardo Steer	
Henan Jianye	(Angola) Nando Rafael	(Sierra Leone) Gibril Sankoh	(Zambia) Christopher Katongo	(Democratic Republic of the Congo) Joël Tshibamba
Hubei China-Kyle	(Brazil) Adiel	(Brazil) Vicente	(Honduras) Mitchel Brown	(Honduras) Quiarol Arzú
Hunan Billows	(Brazil) Leandro Netto	(Croatia) Srebrenko Posavec	(Honduras) Emil Martínez	(Estonia) Taavi Rähn
Shenyang Shenbei	(Brazil) José Duarte	(Serbia) Zoran Rendulić	(South Korea) Kim Geun-chul	
Shenzhen Ruby	(France) Benjamin Gavanon	(Japan) Takashi Rakuyama	(Senegal) Babacar Gueye	
Shijiazhuang Yongchang Junhao	(Costa Rica) Johnny Woodly	(New Zealand) Steven Old	(South Korea) Park Jung-soo	
Tianjin Songjiang	(Brazil) Mário Lúcio	(Colombia) Juan Andrés Bolaños	(Colombia) Martín García	(Brazil) Vaguinho
Yanbian Changbai Tiger	(South Korea) Kim Ki-soo	(South Korea) Ko Ki-gu	(South Korea) Lee Jae-min	

Hong Kong/Macau/Taiwan players (doesn't count on the foreign player slot)

Club	Player 1	Player 2	Player 3
Beijing Baxy	(Chinese Taipei) Chen Hao-wei	(Chinese Taipei) Lin Yueh-han	(Chinese Taipei) Wen Chih-Hao
Guangdong Sunray Cave	(Hong Kong) Chan Siu Ki	(Hong Kong) Leung Chun Pong	
Guizhou Zhicheng	(Hong Kong) Andy Nägelein		
Henan Jianye	(Hong Kong) Godfred Karikari		
Harbin Yiteng	(Hong Kong) Wisdom Fofo Agbo		
Shenzhen Ruby	(Chinese Taipei) Chen Po-liang	(Chinese Taipei) Víctor Chou	
Tianjin Songjiang	(Hong Kong) Ng Wai Chiu		

== League table ==
Pos	Team	Pld	W	D	L	GF	GA	GD	Pts	Promotion or relegation
1	Henan Jianye (P, C)	30	18	8	4	51	21	+30	62	Promotion to Chinese Super League
2	Harbin Yiteng (P)	30	18	6	6	55	29	+26	60	Promotion to Chinese Super League
3	Guangdong Sunray Cave	30	17	6	7	51	29	+22	57	
4	Chongqing Lifan	30	17	5	8	45	27	+18	56	
5	Shenzhen Ruby	30	15	4	11	50	57	−7	49	
6	Shenyang Shenbei	30	13	8	9	46	39	+7	47	
7	Beijing Baxy	30	11	8	11	35	42	−7	41	
8	Shijiazhuang Yongchang Junhao	30	10	10	10	26	25	+1	40	
9	Beijing BIT	30	10	5	15	32	42	−10	35 (Note: Beijing BIT 4 pts; Tianjin Songjiang 1 pts)	
10	Tianjin Songjiang	30	8	11	11	31	36	−5	35	
11	Yanbian Changbai Tiger	30	9	7	14	42	52	−10	31 (Note: Yanbian Changbai Tiger were deducted 3 points because of a match-fixing scandal in 2006.)	
12	Hunan Billows	30	7	9	14	27	40	−13	30 (Note: Hunan Billows 4 pts; Hubei China-Kyle 1 pts)	
13	Hubei China-Kyle	30	8	6	16	27	41	−14	30	
14	Chengdu Tiancheng	30	7	8	15	27	37	−10	29 (Note: Chengdu Tiancheng 4 pts; Chongqing F.C. 1 pts)	
15	Chongqing F.C. (R)	30	7	8	15	24	36	−12	29	Disbanded after season
16	Guizhou Zhicheng (R)	30	5	11	14	29	45	−16	26	Relegation to 2014 CL2

Updated to match(es) played on November 2, 2013. Source: CL1 official website on hupu.com (in Chinese)
Rules for classification: 1) points; 2) goal difference; 3) number of goals scored; 4) head-to-head goals scored; 5) goal difference; 6) goals scored; 7) disciplinary points (1 point for each yellow card, 3 points for each red card). Head-to-Head: Only used at the end of the season when two or more teams need the head-to-head rules to break a tie.
(C) Champions; (P) Promoted; (R) Relegated

== Results ==
Home \ Away	HN	SJZ	HRB	CQL	TJS	SZ	CQ	CD	GD	HUN	SYN	YB	BJT	BJB	GZZ	HBC
Henan Jianye		2–1	0–0	2–1	2–1	1–0	3–1	1–1	3–0	3–0	2–0	4–0	2–1	3–0	3–0	1–0
Shijiazhuang Yongchang Junhao	0–3		1–1	2–0	1–0	2–1	1–0	2–2	2–2	1–0	1–1	3–0	1–2	3–2	1–1	1–0
Harbin Yiteng	0–1	2–1		1–2	2–2	1–1	1–0	3–2	1–0	0–0	5–1	4–3	5–2	2–0	1–0	4–0
Chongqing Lifan	0–0	1–0	2–1		3–2	3–1	1–1	2–0	1–3	4–0	2–0	4–1	1–2	0–1	2–0	2–0
Tianjin Songjiang	0–0	0–0	0–1	0–0		1–2	1–0	2–1	1–0	2–1	1–1	2–4	1–1	1–3	1–1	3–0
Shenzhen Ruby	5–4	0–0	1–3	1–0	3–1		2–1	1–0	0–4	1–0	2–1	2–1	5–2	2–2	5–1	2–1
Chongqing F.C.	2–1	0–1	0–1	0–1	0–0	0–1		1–1	0–1	2–1	1–1	2–2	1–0	2–1	1–1	3–2
Chengdu Tiancheng	1–1	0–0	1–2	1–0	0–1	5–1	2–0		0–2	2–2	0–1	2–0	1–0	0–1	0–3	2–0
Guangdong Sunray Cave	1–2	1–0	3–2	1–1	3–0	3–2	0–1	2–1		2–1	3–2	2–2	1–1	4–0	1–0	1–0
Hunan Billows	1–1	1–0	2–0	0–1	1–1	0–1	1–1	2–0	0–0		2–2	3–2	3–0	1–0	1–1	1–1
Shenyang Shenbei	1–0	1–0	2–2	1–2	0–1	6–0	3–1	0–1	0–5	2–0		3–1	2–0	2–2	2–0	1–1
Yanbian Changbai Tiger	2–1	0–1	1–0	2–4	1–1	5–4	0–0	0–0	2–0	2–0	0–0		3–0	1–1	1–0	4–0
Beijing BIT	1–1	0–0	0–2	1–0	1–0	3–0	2–0	2–0	1–3	3–0	0–1	3–1		1–2	0–0	0–1
Beijing Baxy	1–1	1–0	0–3	1–1	1–3	0–1	2–1	3–1	0–1	2–0	2–4	2–1	2–1		1–1	1–0
Guizhou Zhicheng	0–2	1–0	1–4	1–2	2–1	2–2	1–2	0–0	2–2	2–1	1–2	3–0	1–2	0–0		2–2
Hubei China-Kyle	0–1	0–0	0–1	1–2	1–1	4–1	1–0	2–0	1–0	1–2	1–3	1–0	2–0	1–1	3–1	

Updated to match(es) played on Nov. 2nd, 2013. Source: Results on hupu.com (in Chinese)
Legend: Blue = home team win; Yellow = draw; Red = away team win.

== Positions by round ==
Team ╲ Round	1	2	3	4	5	6	7	8	9	10	11	12	13	14	15	16	17	18	19	20	21	22	23	24	25	26	27	28	29	30
Henan Jianye	1	3	1	1	1	1	1	1	1	1	1	1	1	1	1	1	1	1	1	1	1	1	1	1	1	1	1	1	1	1
Harbin Yiteng	7	5	3	2	4	4	5	4	6	5	4	4	4	4	5	5	4	3	2	2	2	2	2	2	2	2	2	2	3	2
Guangdong Sunray Cave	3	1	2	4	3	2	2	2	3	2	2	2	3	3	3	2	2	2	3	3	4	4	3	3	3	3	3	3	2	3
Chongqing Lifan	2	1	5	4	2	6	3	5	2	4	7	6	5	5	4	4	3	4	4	4	3	3	4	4	4	4	4	4	4	4
Shenzhen Ruby	3	8	9	9	9	7	7	6	4	3	3	3	2	2	2	3	5	5	6	6	6	5	5	5	5	5	5	5	5	5
Shenyang Shenbei	14	11	8	7	8	10	8	8	8	9	9	11	10	10	11	11	11	10	10	10	10	8	8	7	6	6	6	6	6	6
Beijing Baxy	3	4	4	3	6	5	6	7	7	7	6	7	7	6	6	6	6	6	5	5	5	6	6	6	7	7	7	7	7	7
Shijiazhuang Yongchang Junhao	10	7	7	8	7	8	9	10	10	10	10	9	11	11	9	9	9	9	9	9	8	9	9	9	10	9	9	8	8	8
Beijing BIT	3	6	6	6	5	3	4	3	5	6	5	5	6	7	7	7	8	8	8	8	9	10	10	10	9	10	8	9	9	9
Tianjin Songjiang	8	9	10	11	10	9	10	9	9	8	8	8	8	8	8	8	7	7	7	7	7	7	7	8	8	8	10	10	10	10
Yanbian Changbai Tiger	16	16	14	10	12	12	12	12	13	14	12	13	12	13	14	13	14	14	15	14	14	13	11	11	12	12	11	11	11	11
Hunan Billows	8	9	11	12	11	11	11	11	11	11	11	10	9	9	10	10	10	12	12	12	11	11	12	12	11	11	12	12	12	12
Hubei China-Kyle	10	14	15	15	15	14	16	15	16	16	15	14	13	12	13	12	12	11	11	11	12	12	14	13	13	14	15	13	14	13
Chengdu Tiancheng	10	13	12	13	13	16	15	16	12	13	14	12	14	14	12	14	13	13	14	13	13	16	16	16	14	13	13	14	13	14
Chongqing F.C.	13	15	15	15	15	14	14	13	14	12	13	15	15	15	16	16	16	16	16	16	16	15	15	15	16	15	16	16	15	15
Guizhou Zhicheng	15	12	13	14	14	13	13	14	15	15	16	16	16	16	15	15	15	15	13	15	15	14	13	14	15	16	14	15	16	16

Winner; promoted to Chinese Super League
Runner-up; promoted to Chinese Super League
Relegated to China League Two
Disbanded after season

Updated to match(es) played on Nov. 2, 2013. Source: Table by round (in Chinese)

== Top scorers ==
Rank	Player	Club	Total
1	(Senegal) Babacar Gueye	Shenzhen Ruby	23
2	(Brazil) Guto	Chongqing Lifan	19
3	(South Korea) Lee Jae-min	Yanbian Changbai Tiger	18
3	(Brazil) José Duarte	Shenyang Shenbei	18
5	(Brazil) Dori	Guangdong Sunray Cave	16
5	(Uruguay) Danilo Peinado	Beijing BIT	16
7	(Brazil) Netto	Hunan Billows	13
7	(Brazil) Rodrigo	Harbin Yiteng	13
9	(Costa Rica) Johnny Woodly	Shijiazhuang Yongchang Junhao	12
9	(China) Bu Xin	Harbin Yiteng	12

== Awards ==
The awards of 2013 China League One were announced on 19 December 2013.

- Most valuable player: (China) Xu Yang (Henan Jianye)
- Top scorer: (Senegal) Babacar Gueye (Shenzhen Ruby)
- Best goalkeeper: (China) Zhou Yajun (Henan Jianye)
- Best coach: (China) Tang Yaodong (Henan Jianye)

== League Attendance ==
Pos	Team	Total	High	Low	Average	Change
1	Henan Jianye^{†}	286,138	22,528	13,526	19,076	+8.8%
2	Shijiazhuang Yongchang Junhao	150,800	20,000	5,500	10,053	+142.7%
3	Shenzhen Ruby	99,995	10,851	2,180	6,666	+3.4%
4	Harbin Yiteng	98,099	18,451	3,017	6,540	+63.4%
5	Yanbian Changbai Tiger	72,694	8,136	1,688	4,846	−9.8%
6	Hunan Billows	70,025	15,388	957	4,668	−33.0%
7	Chengdu Tiancheng	53,860	6,750	586	3,591	+77.2%
8	Guangdong Sunray Cave	44,024	11,503	803	2,935	+165.9%
9	Chongqing Lifan	40,875	4,608	1,261	2,725	−32.6%
10	Guizhou Zhicheng^{‡}	39,275	5,437	1,583	2,618	n/a
11	Beijing Baxy	34,035	5,369	860	2,269	+168.5%
12	Tianjin Songjiang	33,703	8,779	561	2,247	−25.1%
13	Hubei China-Kyle^{‡}	33,089	6,079	1,115	2,206	n/a
14	Chongqing F.C.	30,860	7,136	958	2,057	−56.0%
15	Beijing BIT	26,873	3,500	601	1,792	+20.2%
16	Shenyang Shenbei	15,567	5,182	420	1,038	+2.0%
	League total	1,129,912	22,528	420	4,708	+17.8%

Updated to games played on Nov. 2nd, 2013
Source: CFA (in Chinese)
Notes:
^{†} Teams played previous season in CSL.
^{‡} Teams played previous season in CL2.
