= Li Zhaonan =

Chinese footballer (born 1982)

Personal information
- Date of birth: 22 September 1982 (age 44)
- Place of birth: Luoyang, Henan, China
- Height: 1.78 m (5 ft 10 in)
- Position: Defender

Senior career*
Years	Team	Apps	(Gls)
2009–2016	Henan Jianye	84	(0)
2014	→ Hunan Billows (loan)	13	(0)
2016	→ Hunan Billows (loan)	16	(0)
2017–2018	Hainan Boying	30	(1)
Total		143	(1)
- * Club domestic league appearances and goals

Li Zhaonan (Chinese: 李昭楠; pinyin: Lǐ Zhāonán; born 22 September 1982) is a former Chinese footballer.

== Career statistics ==
=== Club ===
Club	Season	League			Cup		Continental		Other		Total	
Club	Season	Division	Apps	Goals	Apps	Goals	Apps	Goals	Apps	Goals	Apps	Goals
Henan Jianye	2009	Chinese Super League	16	0	0	0	–		0	0	16	0
Henan Jianye	2010	Chinese Super League	25	0	0	0	4 (Note: Appearances in the AFC Champions League)	0	0	0	29	0
Henan Jianye	2011	Chinese Super League	16	0	0	0	–		0	0	16	0
Henan Jianye	2012	Chinese Super League	16	0	0	0	–		0	0	16	0
Henan Jianye	2013	China League One	0	0	2 (Note: Appearances in the Chinese FA Cup)	0	–		0	0	2	0
Henan Jianye	2014	Chinese Super League	11	0	0	0	–		0	0	11	0
Henan Jianye	2015	Chinese Super League	0	0	0	0	–		0	0	0	0
Henan Jianye	2016	Chinese Super League	0	0	0	0	–		0	0	0	0
Henan Jianye	Total		84	0	2	0	4	0	0	0	90	0
Hunan Billows (loan)	2014	China League One	13	0	0	0	–		0	0	14	4
Hunan Billows (loan)	2016	China League One	16	0	0	0	–		0	0	14	3
Hunan Billows (loan)	Total		19	0	0	0	0	0	0	0	19	9
Hainan Boying	2017	China League Two	19	1	0	0	–		2 (Note: Appearances in the China League Two playoffs)	0	21	1
Hainan Boying	2018	China League Two	11	0	0	0	–		0	0	11	0
Hainan Boying	Total		30	0	0	0	0	0	2	0	32	9
Career total			143	1	2	0	4	0	2	0	151	1

== Honours ==
Henan Jianye

- China League One: 2013
