= Wei Jian =

Chinese association football player

Personal information
- Date of birth: 6 January 1991 (age 35)
- Place of birth: Guiyang, Guizhou, China
- Height: 1.86 m (6 ft 1 in)
- Position: Goalkeeper

Team information
- Current team: Shenzhen Peng City (goalkeeping coach)

Senior career*
Years	Team	Apps	(Gls)
2008–2013	Guizhou Zhicheng		
2014–2020	Shenzhen FC	12	(0)
2016	→ Sichuan Longfor (loan)	16	(0)
2017	→ Sintrense (loan)	7	(0)
2020	→ Nanjing City (loan)	12	(0)
2021	Nanjing City	0	(0)

Managerial career
- 2024–: Shenzhen Peng City (goalkeeping)
- * Club domestic league appearances and goals as of 14:01, 13 May 2022 (UTC)

Wei Jian (Chinese: 韦健; born 6 January 1991) is a Chinese football coach and former footballer who played as a goalkeeper.

== Personal life ==
Wei is the brother of fellow professional footballer, Wei Chao.

== Career statistics ==
=== Club ===
As of 8 February 2022.

Club	Season	League			Cup		Other		Total	
Club	Season	Division	Apps	Goals	Apps	Goals	Apps	Goals	Apps	Goals
Shenzhen FC	2014	China League One	3	0	0	0	0	0	3	0
Shenzhen FC	2015	China League One	9	0	0	0	0	0	9	0
Shenzhen FC	2016	China League One	0	0	0	0	0	0	0	0
Shenzhen FC	2017	China League One	0	0	0	0	0	0	0	0
Shenzhen FC	2018	China League One	0	0	0	0	0	0	0	0
Shenzhen FC	2019	Chinese Super League	0	0	0	0	0	0	0	0
Shenzhen FC	2020	Chinese Super League	0	0	0	0	0	0	0	0
Shenzhen FC	Total		12	0	0	0	0	0	12	0
Sichuan Longfor	2016	China League Two	11	0	1 (Note: Appearances in the Chinese FA Cup)	0	5 (Note: Appearances in the China League Two playoffs)	0	17	0
Sintrense	2017–2018	Campeonato de Portugal	7	0	1 (Note: Appearances in the Taça de Portugal)	0	0	0	8	0
Nanjing City (loan)	2020	China League Two	9	0	0	0	3	0	12	0
Nanjing City	2021	China League One	0	0	1	0	0	0	1	0
Nanjing City	2022	China League One	0	0	0	0	0	0	0	0
Nanjing City	Total		9	0	1	0	3	0	13	0
Career total			12	0	0	0	2	0	14	0
