= Bortoletto =

Bortoletto is a surname of Italian origin. Notable people with the surname include:

- Albano Bortoletto Cavallin (1930–2017), Brazilian Roman Catholic prelate
- Daniela Bortoletto, Italian-British high energy physicist
- Gianni Bortoletto (born 1956), Italian football manager
- Raoul Bortoletto (1925–2003), Italian professional footballer

== See also ==
- Gabriel Bortoleto, Brazilian racing driver
