= Luis Carlos Cabezas =

Colombian footballer (born 1986)

Personal information
- Full name: Luis Carlos Cabezas Mairongo
- Date of birth: March 3, 1986 (age 40)
- Place of birth: Cali, Colombia
- Height: 6 ft 0 in (1.83 m)
- Position: Forward

Team information
- Current team: Cúcuta Deportivo
- Number: 18

Youth career
- Selección Valle
- Deportivo Cali

Senior career*
Years	Team	Apps	(Gls)
2007	Córdoba FC	31	(9)
2008–2009	Deportivo Cali	6	(0)
2009	Monagas	15	(3)
2010	Deportivo Pereira	6	(0)
2010–2011	Caracas	32	(15)
2011–2012	Dalian Aerbin	11	(6)
2012	→ Shanghai East Asia (loan)	27	(8)
2013	Shanghai East Asia	28	(2)
2014–2016	Hunan Billows	82	(27)
2017	Wilstermann	13	(1)
2017–2018	Al-Nasr		
2018	La Equidad	14	(0)
2019	Deportivo La Guaira	16	(9)
2019	Atlético Venezuela	14	(1)
2020–	Cúcuta Deportivo	5	(0)
- * Club domestic league appearances and goals as of 19:26, 4 July 2020 (UTC)

Luis Carlos Cabezas (Latin American Spanish: [lwisˈkaɾlos kaˈβesas]; born March 3, 1986) is a Colombian footballer that plays for Cúcuta Deportivo.

== Club career ==
Luis Carlos was formed in the storied Colombian club's youth system making his debut for the first team during the 2006 season. He plays as a striker and was sub champion of the Copa Mustang in 2006 with Deportivo Cali. During 2007 he was loaned to second division side Córdoba FC to gain more experience. He ended the campaign as Córdoba FC's leading scorer, tallying nine goals. At the conclusion of the 2007 season Cabezas was recalled by Deportivo Cali.

Luis Carlos transferred to China League One club Dalian Aerbin in July 2011. He signed a three-year contract with the club. He scored four goals in a league match which Dalian Aerbin beat Hunan Billows 6–2 on October 22, 2011. Luis Carlos scored 6 goals in 11 appearances as Dalian Aerbin won promotion to the top flight for the first time of club's history.

On January 20, 2012, Dalian Aerbin swapped Cabezas with Aidi of China League One side Shanghai East Asia in a loan deal. He made 27 league appearances and scored 8 goals in the 2012 season, as Shanghai East Asia won the champions and promoted to the top flight. He made a free transfer to Shanghai East Asia on a two-year deal on February 20, 2013.

On February 26, 2014, Cabezas transferred to China League One side Hunan Billows.

== Chinese League career statistics ==
(Correct as of October 22, 2016)

Season	Club	League	League		FA Cup		CSL Cup		Asia		Total	
Season	Club	League	Apps	Goals	Apps	Goals	Apps	Goals	Apps	Goals	Apps	Goals
2011	Dalian Aerbin	China League One	11	6	0	0	-	-	-	-	11	6
2012	Shanghai East Asia	China League One	27	8	0	0	-	-	-	-	27	8
2013	Shanghai East Asia	Chinese Super League	28	2	1	0	-	-	-	-	29	2
2014	Hunan Billows	China League One	29	15	1	0	-	-	-	-	30	15
2015	Hunan Billows	China League One	25	7	0	0	-	-	-	-	25	7
2016	Hunan Billows	China League One	28	5	0	0	-	-	-	-	28	5
Total			148	43	2	0	0	0	0	0	150	43

== Honors ==
Dalian Aerbin

- China League One: 2011

Shanghai East Asia

- China League One: 2012
