= Elias (footballer, born 1983) =

Brazilian footballer

Personal information
- Full name: Elias Luis dos Reis
- Date of birth: 29 October 1983 (age 43)
- Place of birth: Jandaia do Sul, Paraná, Brazil
- Height: 1.79 m (5 ft 10 in)
- Position: Midfielder

Team information
- Current team: Barretos

Senior career*
Years	Team	Apps	(Gls)
2004	Matsubara	?	(?)
2004–2005	Necaxa	5	(0)
2005–2010	Mogi Mirim	?	(?)
2010–2011	Al Naser	14	(0)
2011–2012	Linense	-	(-)
2012	Criciúma	19	(0)
2013	Linense	-	(-)
2013–2014	Bragantino	15	(0)
2014	Chongqing Lifan	30	(1)
2015	Al-Fateh	10	(0)
2015	Dibba Al Fujairah	2	(0)
2016	Linense	0	(0)
2017	Água Santa	0	(0)
2018	Itumbiara	0	(0)
2019–	Barretos	0	(0)
- * Club domestic league appearances and goals as of 8 April 2019

Elias Luis dos Reis, known as Elias (born 29 October 1983) is a Brazilian football player at the position of midfielder who currently plays for Barretos.

== Career ==
Elías began playing football with Matsubara before signing with Necaxa in 2005.

On 26 February 2014, Elías transferred to China League One side Chongqing Lifan.

== Honours ==
=== Club ===
Chongqing Lifan

- China League One: 2014
