= Miao Huaxu =

Chinese association football player

Personal information
- Date of birth: 4 July 2000 (age 26)
- Place of birth: Dalian, Liaoning, China
- Height: 1.86 m (6 ft 1 in)
- Position: Midfielder

Youth career
- 2010–2012: Dalian Aerbin
- 2013–2016: Valencia
- 2016–2018: Atlético Madrid

Senior career*
Years	Team	Apps	(Gls)
2019	CD Serranos B	19	(4)
2019	CF Albuixech	4	(0)
2019	CD Serranos		
2019–2020	Burjassot	1	(0)
2021	Qingdao Red Lions	16	(0)
2022	Hunan Billows	5	(0)
- * Club domestic league appearances and goals as of 14:01, 5 May 2022 (UTC)

Miao Huaxu (Chinese: 苗华旭; born 4 July 2000) is a Chinese footballer who plays as a midfielder.

== Club career ==
Miao spent most of his youth career in Spain, including a spell with Atlético Madrid between 2016 and 2018. He spent time with CD Serranos' B team, scoring four goals in nineteen appearances.

He returned to China with the Qingdao Red Lions in 2021.

== Career statistics ==
=== Club ===
As of 25 July 2021.

Club	Season	League			Cup		Continental		Other		Total	
Club	Season	Division	Apps	Goals	Apps	Goals	Apps	Goals	Apps	Goals	Apps	Goals
CF Albuixech	2019–2020	Valencian Regional Preferente	4	0	0	0	–		0	0	4	0
Burjassot	2019–2020	Valencian Regional Preferente	1	0	0	0	–		0	0	1	0
Qingdao Red Lions	2021	China League Two	7	0	0	0	–		0	0	7	0
Career total			12	0	0	0	0	0	0	0	12	0
