= Abel Nazario (footballer) =

Uruguayan footballer (born 1983)

Personal information
- Full name: Víctor Abel Nazario Brun
- Date of birth: 12 January 1983 (age 43)
- Place of birth: Melo, Uruguay
- Height: 1.85 m (6 ft 1 in)
- Position: Right-back

Youth career
- Cerro Largo

Senior career*
| Years | Team | Apps | (Gls) |
| 2003–2010 | Cerro Largo | | |
| 2010–2011 | Montevideo Wanderers | 26 | (2) |
| 2011 | Caracas | 8 | (0) |
| 2011–2013 | Cerro Largo | 35 | (0) |
| 2013–2016 | Beijing IT | 45 | (5) |
| 2016 | Cerro Largo | 18 | (4) |
- * Club domestic league appearances and goals

Víctor Abel Nazario Brun (born 12 January 1983) is a Uruguayan former footballer.

== Career statistics ==
=== Club ===
| Club | Season | League | | | Cup | | Continental | | Other | | Total | |
| Club | Season | Division | Apps | Goals | Apps | Goals | Apps | Goals | Apps | Goals | Apps | Goals |
|---|---|---|---|---|---|---|---|---|---|---|---|---|
| Cerro Largo | 2009–10 | Uruguayan Primera División | 13 | 2 | 0 | 0 | – | | 0 | 0 | 13 | 2 |
| Montevideo Wanderers | 2009–10 | Uruguayan Primera División | 15 | 2 | 0 | 0 | – | | 0 | 0 | 15 | 2 |
| Montevideo Wanderers | 2010–11 | Uruguayan Primera División | 11 | 0 | 0 | 0 | – | | 0 | 0 | 11 | 0 |
| Montevideo Wanderers | Total | | 26 | 2 | 0 | 0 | 0 | 0 | 0 | 0 | 26 | 2 |
| Caracas | 2010–11 | Venezuelan Primera División | 8 | 0 | 0 | 0 | – | | 0 | 0 | 8 | 0 |
| Cerro Largo | 2010–11 | Uruguayan Primera División | 11 | 0 | 0 | 0 | – | | 0 | 0 | 11 | 0 |
| Cerro Largo | 2011–12 | Uruguayan Primera División | 21 | 0 | 0 | 0 | – | | 0 | 0 | 21 | 0 |
| Cerro Largo | 2012–13 | Uruguayan Primera División | 3 | 0 | 0 | 0 | 1 (Note: Appearances in the Copa Sudamericana) | 0 | 0 | 0 | 4 | 0 |
| Cerro Largo | Total | | 35 | 0 | 0 | 0 | 1 | 0 | 0 | 0 | 36 | 0 |
| Beijing IT | 2013 | China League One | 0 | 0 | 1 (Note: Appearances in the Chinese FA Cup) | 0 | – | | 0 | 0 | 1 | 0 |
| Beijing IT | 2014 | China League One | 17 | 2 | 1 | 0 | – | | 0 | 0 | 18 | 2 |
| Beijing IT | 2015 | China League One | 28 | 3 | 0 | 0 | – | | 0 | 0 | 28 | 3 |
| Beijing IT | Total | | 45 | 5 | 2 | 0 | 0 | 0 | 0 | 0 | 47 | 5 |
| Cerro Largo | 2015–16 | Uruguayan Segunda División | 13 | 2 | 0 | 0 | – | | 0 | 0 | 13 | 2 |
| Cerro Largo | 2016 | Uruguayan Segunda División | 5 | 2 | 0 | 0 | – | | 0 | 0 | 5 | 2 |
| Cerro Largo | Total | | 18 | 4 | 0 | 0 | 0 | 0 | 0 | 0 | 18 | 4 |
| Career total | | | 145 | 13 | 2 | 0 | 1 | 0 | 0 | 0 | 148 | 13 |
