= Tomaž Kavčič =

Slovenian footballer and manager

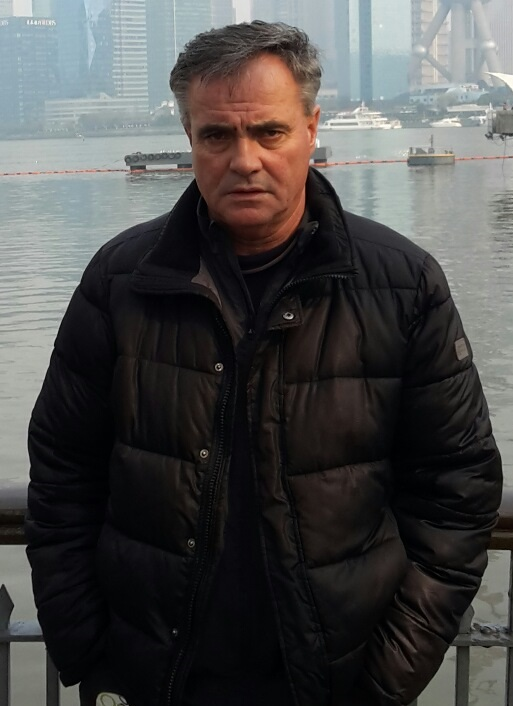

Personal information
- Full name: Tomaž Kavčič
- Date of birth: 28 November 1953 (age 72)
- Place of birth: Novo Mesto, FPR Yugoslavia
- Height: 1.74 m (5 ft 9 in)
- Position: Midfielder

Senior career*
Years	Team	Apps	(Gls)
1990–1992	Gorica	31	(1)
1992–1993	Svoboda	14	(1)

Managerial career
- 1997–1998: Črnuče Factor
- 1998–1999: Svoboda
- 2001–2002: Bela Krajina
- 2002–2003: Grosuplje
- 2003: Ljubljana
- 2003–2004: Brinje
- 2004–2005: Bela Krajina
- 2006: Factor
- 2007: Bela Krajina
- 2007–2008: Livar
- 2008–2014: Slovenia U21
- 2014–2015: Qingdao Jonoon
- 2016: Hunan Billows
- 2017–2018: Slovenia
- 2019–2020: Qingdao Red Lions
- * Club domestic league appearances and goals

Tomaž Kavčič (born 28 November 1953) is a Slovenian football manager and former player who played as a midfielder. Kavčič was the manager of the Slovenia national team between 2017 and 2018, and the manager of the Slovenia under-21 team for eight years between 2008 and 2014; he was also assistant manager to Srečko Katanec between 2016 and 2017. While playing for Gorica, he scored his debut goal in the Slovenian First League aged 38 years and 4 months, which is still a Slovenian record.

== Managerial career ==
After finishing his playing career he took his first coaching job as assistant manager to Milan Miklavič at Gorica in 1995 where he worked until 1997 and got his first experience in the Slovenian top tier. "The Roses" were crowned champions of Slovenia for the first time in 1996 and a year later he joined Črnuče Factor in the second tier. After a brief one-year spell he moved across town to Svoboda and stayed for another year before leading the amateur MNZ Ljubljana team in Slovenia's first UEFA Regions' Cup appearance in 1999.

The same year he returned to Gorica under Miklavič and took charge of the youth team and for a short spell he made his debut in the First Division as coach of the senior team. Kavčič started his first full season as coach in the 1. SNL at his hometown club Bela Krajina, but after the 2001–02 season he went back to the lower leagues with Grosuplje. After another brief spell, his career really took off with two promotions in three years. After spending the first part of the 2003–04 season in the First Division with Ljubljana, Kavčič returned to Bela Krajina where he gained promotion in 2004.

The team fought off relegation in 2004–05, but Kavčič took on a new challenge after two years in charge. Again he took over a second tier team, this time his old club Factor, and this time the small local team from the banks of the Sava river gained promotion in 2006. He didn't get the chance to lead his old side in the First Division, but instead returned to Bela Krajina in March 2007. Fighting for survival, Bela Krajina became the first team to defeat Domžale (which later won the league) during the season, after beating them 1–0 in the 28th game round. However, Bela Krajina were nevertheless relegated and missed the relegation playoff by a single point with their interim manager leaving to take charge of Livar for the 2007–08 season which ended in relegation in their first and only appearance in the top tier.

=== Slovenia under-21 team ===
In February 2008, Kavčič took over the Slovenia national under-21 football team. In 2012, Slovenia U21 came close to qualifying for their first ever UEFA European Under-21 Championship as his protégés Kevin Kampl, Luka Krajnc, Haris Vučkić, Robert Berić, Dejan Lazarević and others beat Sweden 2–1 at Ljudski vrt with Lazarević's penalty, but it wasn't enough for a play-off berth as the Swedes won their last game against Ukraine.

Kavčič managed his last game as the manager of under-21 team in May 2014 in a 5–0 victory against Andorra.

=== Qingdao Jonoon ===
In July 2014, Kavčič was confirmed as the new manager of Qingdao Jonoon. The Jia League was already under way and Kavčič helped the club finish strongly, only to be denied in the fight for promotion by a seven-point deduction following the January transfer of Liu Jian. His first full season didn't start as planned, but Jonoon soon silenced the critics after the opening day defeat against Harbin Yiteng. After the 4–1 loss they racked up a nine-game unbeaten run which started with winning the Qingdao derby against Qingdao Hainiu by two goals without reply.

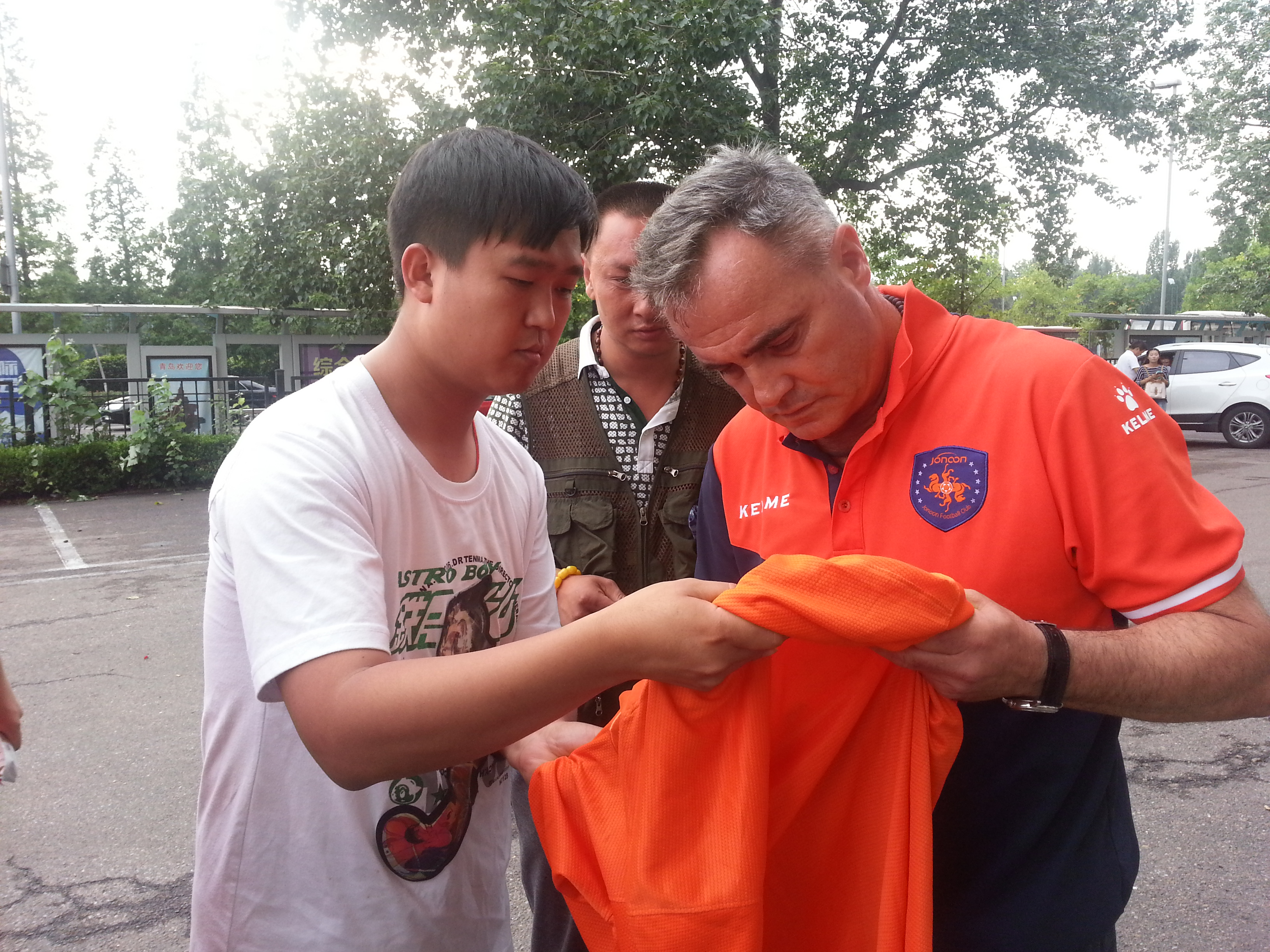
Kavčič signing autographs in Qingdao after winning the derby against Hainiu in July 2015.

Round 10 brought renewed hope to the fans as one of the founding members of the Chinese Super League topped the league standings for the first time. Beating Jiangxi Liansheng 2–0 reignited talks of a return to the top tier in their second attempt. On 12 July Jonoon won the derby against city rivals Hainiu courtesy of a Quan Lei strike in the 80th minute but despite the 1–0 win a good run of results with a depleted squad Kavčič was frozen out of the team since the middle of July - when Jonoon was still fighting for promotion.

On 5 October he confirmed that he and his assistant Robert Englaro are leaving the club by mutual consent with their now former team down in 7th place in the Jia League. Kavčič had lost overall control of the team months ago but remained in the city. Jonoon only won once since the controversial decision of the club's leadership and were in danger of finishing in the bottom half of the table. He immediately returned to China and became head coach of Hunan Xiangtao on 30 November.

=== Hunan Xiangtao ===
In Yiyang he once more formed a partnership with Englaro and they took charge of a team that barely fought off relegation in 2015. Slovenian defender Rok Elsner was one of only a few signings the team made before the start of the new season. They started off by surprisingly holding promotion chasers Beijing Renhe to a goalless draw in their home opener, followed by a win against another title contender Dalian Yifang. Ten-man Hunan held Vanderlei Luxemburgo's high-scoring Tianjin Songijang to a 1–1 draw in the next fixture, Luis Carlos Cabezas scoring from a penalty in injury time. After a promising start Guizhou Hengfeng Zhicheng beat Hunan 2–0 at home and Kavčič suffered his first official defeat at the Yiyang based club. More defeats followed and together with internal dissent which almost cost Hunan relegation in 2015 the team dropped down the table. Kavčič offered to resign and before leaving the club he was offered an adviser's role.

=== Slovenia national team ===
On 4 December 2017, Kavčič was appointed as the new manager of the Slovenian national team, replacing Katanec. Kavčič was previously a part of Katanec's technical team between 2016 and 2017. After five defeats in seven matches, he was sacked on 17 October 2018, becoming the shortest-serving Slovenian manager in history.

== Honours ==
=== Manager ===
Factor Ježica

- Slovenian Second League: 2005–06

== Managerial statistics ==
Team	From	To	Record					Ref.
Team	From	To	G	W	D	L	Win %	Ref.
Slovenia	4 December 2017	17 October 2018	7	1	1	5	14.29	
