= Guto (footballer, born 1988) =

Brazilian footballer

Personal information
- Full name: Augusto Pacheco Fraga
- Date of birth: 4 May 1988 (age 38)
- Place of birth: Criciúma, Brazil
- Height: 1.84 m (6 ft 0 in)
- Position: Forward

Youth career
- 2005–2006: Internacional

Senior career*
Years	Team	Apps	(Gls)
2007–2009	Internacional	15	(2)
2008	Náutico (loan)	0	(0)
2009	→ Sport Recife (loan)	10	(1)
2010	Oeste	9	(1)
2010–2011	Internacional	7	(1)
2011	→ Goiás (loan)	29	(10)
2012–2015	Chongqing Lifan	95	(56)
2016	Wuhan Zall	17	(6)
2017–2018	Zhejiang Yiteng	52	(22)
2019	Shaanxi Chang'an Athletic	5	(2)
2019–2020	Nei Mongol Zhongyou	20	(5)
Total		254	(104)

International career
- Brazil U16
- * Club domestic league appearances and goals

Augusto Pacheco Fraga or simply Guto (born 4 May 1988), is a Brazilian retired professional footballer who played as a forward.

== Club career ==
He made his professional debut for Internacional in a 1–1 draw away to Náutico on 2 September 2007, in the Campeonato Brasileiro.

Guto transferred to China League One side Chongqing Lifan in February 2012. He won China League One top scorer title in the 2014 season on Chongqing Lifan's promotion to the CSL. On 15 January 2016, Guto transferred to China League One side Wuhan Zall. He moved to fellow League One club Zhejiang Yiteng on 20 January 2017.

== Career statistics ==
Appearances and goals by club, season and competition
Club	Season	League			State league		National cup		Continental		Other		Total	
Club	Season	Division	Apps	Goals	Apps	Goals	Apps	Goals	Apps	Goals	Apps	Goals	Apps	Goals
Internacional	2007	Série A	1	0	0 (Note: Appearances in Campeonato Gaúcho)	0	—		0	0	—		1	0
Internacional	2008	Série A	11	1	3	1	1	0	0	0	—		15	2
Internacional	Total		12	1	3	1	1	0	0	0	—		16	2
Sport Recife (loan)	2009	Série A	10	1	0 (Note: Appearances in Campeonato Pernambucano)	0	0	0	3 (Note: Appearances in Copa Libertadores)	0	—		13	1
Oeste	2010	Série D	—		9 (Note: Appearances in Campeonato Paulista)	1	—		—		—		9	1
Internacional	2010	Série A	1	0	0	0	0	0	0	0	0	0	1	0
Internacional	2011	Série A	0	0	6	1	—		0	0	—		6	1
Internacional	Total		1	0	6	1	0	0	0	0	0	0	7	1
Goiás (loan)	2011	Série B	23	7	6 (Note: Appearances in Campeonato Goiano)	3	2	2	—		—		31	12
Chongqing Lifan	2012	China League One	29	14	—		0	0	—		—		5	0
Chongqing Lifan	2013	China League One	28	19	—		0	0	—		—		0	0
Chongqing Lifan	2014	China League One	28	21	—		1	0	—		—		0	0
Chongqing Lifan	2015	Chinese Super League	10	2	—		0	0	—		—		0	0
Chongqing Lifan	Total		95	56	—		1	0	—		—		96	56
Wuhan Zall	2016	China League One	17	6	—		0	0	—		—		17	6
Zhejiang Yiteng	2017	China League One	24	12	—		0	0	—		—		24	12
Zhejiang Yiteng	2018	China League One	28	10	—		0	0	—		—		28	10
Zhejiang Yiteng	Total		52	22	—		0	0	—		—		52	22
Shaanxi Chang'an Athletic	2019	China League One	5	2	—		0	0	—		—		5	2
Inner Mongolia Zhongyou	2019	China League One	8	2	—		0	0	—		—		8	2
Inner Mongolia Zhongyou	2020	China League One	7	2	—		0	0	—		—		7	2
Inner Mongolia Zhongyou	Total		15	4	—		0	0	—		—		15	4
Career total			230	99	24	5	4	2	3	0	0	0	261	106

== Honours ==
Chongqing Lifan

- China League One: 2014
