= Wei Chao =

Chinese association football player

Personal information
- Date of birth: 18 March 1993 (age 33)
- Place of birth: Guiyang, Guizhou, China
- Height: 1.78 m (5 ft 10 in)
- Position: Forward

Youth career
- Metz
- –2013: Sichuan

Senior career*
Years	Team	Apps	(Gls)
2013–2014	Chengdu Tiancheng		
2014	→ Shenzhen Ruby (loan)	1	(0)
2016–2017	Chengdu Qbao	6	(0)
2017–2018	Montalegre		
2019–2021	Qingdao Hainiu		
- * Club domestic league appearances and goals as of 14:01, 8 February 2022 (UTC)

Wei Chao (Chinese: 韦超; born 18 March 1993) is a Chinese football coach and former footballer who played as a forward.

== Club career ==
Having started his career in France with Metz, where he was top scorer in the under-16 league, Wei returned to China to forge a career in the lower leagues.

== Personal life ==
Wei is the brother of fellow professional footballer, Wei Jian.

== Career statistics ==
=== Club ===
As of 8 February 2022.

Club	Season	League			Cup		Other		Total	
Club	Season	Division	Apps	Goals	Apps	Goals	Apps	Goals	Apps	Goals
Chengdu Tiancheng	2014	China League One	3	0	0	0	0	0	3	0
Shenzhen Ruby (loan)	2014	China League One	1	0	0	0	0	0	1	0
Chengdu Qbao	2016	China League Two	6	0	2 (Note: Appearances in the Chinese FA Cup)	0	1 (Note: Appearances in the China League Two playoffs)	0	9	0
Chengdu Qbao	2017	China League Two	0	0	1	0	0	0	1	0
Chengdu Qbao	Total		6	0	3	0	1	0	10	0
Qingdao Hainiu	2019	China League Two	2	0	0	0	0	0	2	0
Qingdao Hainiu	2020	China League Two	0	0	0	0	0	0	0	0
Qingdao Hainiu	2021	China League Two	0	0	0	0	0	0	0	0
Qingdao Hainiu	2022	China League One	0	0	0	0	0	0	0	0
Qingdao Hainiu	Total		2	0	0	0	0	0	2	0
Career total			12	0	3	0	1	0	16	0
