= Li Guangwen =

Chinese footballer

Li Guangwen 李光文 리광문
Personal information
- Date of birth: 20 June 1992 (age 34)
- Place of birth: Yanbian, Jilin, China
- Height: 1.75 m (5 ft 9 in)
- Position: Defensive midfielder

Team information
- Current team: Nanjing City

Youth career
- Changchun Yatai

Senior career*
Years	Team	Apps	(Gls)
2011–2022	Changchun Yatai	105	(3)
2014	→ Lijiang Jiayunhao (loan)	7	(0)
2023-2024	Yunnan Yukun	15	(0)
2025-	Nanjing City	2	(0)
- * Club domestic league appearances and goals as of 31 December 2020

Li Guangwen (Chinese: 李光文; pinyin: Lǐ Guāngwén; Korean: 리광문; born 20 June 1992), previously known as Li Guang (Chinese: 李光; Korean: 리광), is a Chinese football player of Korean descent who currently plays for Nanjing City in the China League One.

== Club career ==
Li started his professional football career in 2011 when he was promoted to Chinese Super League side Changchun Yatai's first team. He did not appear for Changchun in the 2011 league season. On 10 August 2012, he made his senior debut in a 0–0 away draw against Guizhou Renhe, coming on as a substitute for Wang Dong in the 72nd minute. Li made 4 league appearances in the 2012 season.

== Personal life ==
Li Guang's twin younger brother Li Shangwen is also a professional footballer. They played together in Changchun Yatai.

== Career statistics ==
Statistics accurate as of match played 31 December 2020.

Appearances and goals by club, season and competition
Club	Season	League			National Cup		Continental		Other		Total	
Club	Season	Division	Apps	Goals	Apps	Goals	Apps	Goals	Apps	Goals	Apps	Goals
Changchun Yatai	2011	Chinese Super League	0	0	0	0	-		-		0	0
Changchun Yatai	2012	Chinese Super League	4	0	0	0	-		-		4	0
Changchun Yatai	2013	Chinese Super League	4	0	2	0	-		-		6	0
Changchun Yatai	2014	Chinese Super League	2	0	1	0	-		-		3	0
Changchun Yatai	2015	Chinese Super League	19	1	1	0	-		-		20	1
Changchun Yatai	2016	Chinese Super League	17	0	0	0	-		-		17	0
Changchun Yatai	2017	Chinese Super League	14	0	0	0	-		-		14	0
Changchun Yatai	2018	Chinese Super League	15	0	0	0	-		-		15	0
Changchun Yatai	2019	China League One	21	1	3	0	-		-		24	1
Changchun Yatai	2020	China League One	9	1	0	0	-		-		9	1
Changchun Yatai	Total		105	3	7	0	0	0	0	0	112	3
Lijiang Jiayunhao (loan)	2014	China League Two	7	0	0	0	-		-		7	0
Career total			112	3	7	0	0	0	0	0	119	3

== Honours ==
=== Club ===
Changchun Yatai

- China League One: 2020
