= Hunan Provincial People's Stadium =

Football stadium in Changsha, Hunan, China

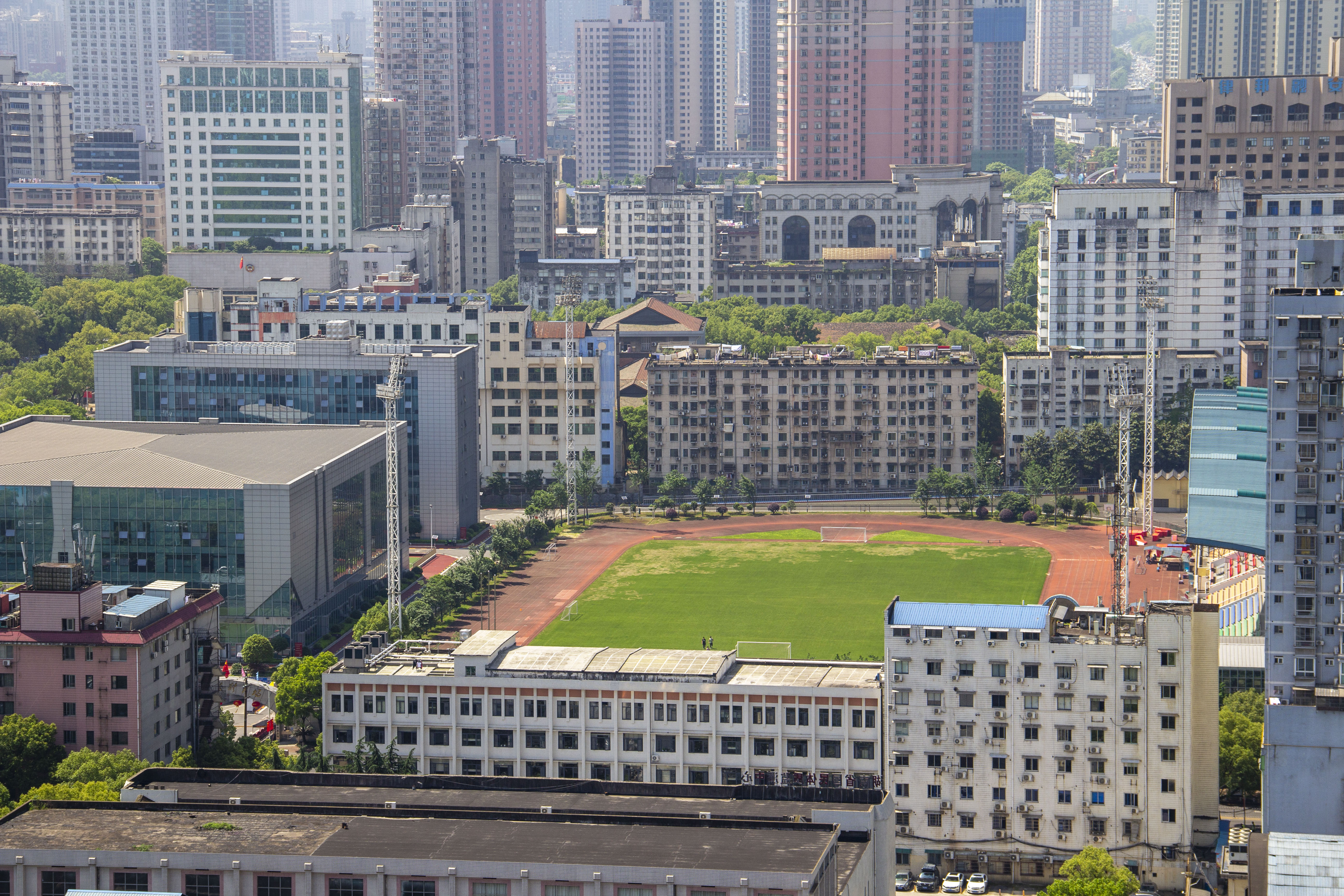
Hunan Provincial People's Stadium

Hunan Provincial People's Stadium (Simplified Chinese: 湖南省人民体育场) is a football stadium in Changsha, Hunan, China. This stadium holds 6,000 people.
