= Andrés Márquez =

Uruguayan footballer (born 1984)

Personal information
- Full name: Andrés Leonardo Márquez Goytiño
- Date of birth: 3 September 1984 (age 42)
- Place of birth: Sarandí del Yí, Uruguay
- Height: 1.78 m (5 ft 10 in)
- Position: Forward

Team information
- Current team: Plaza Colonia
- Number: 7

Senior career*
Years	Team	Apps	(Gls)
2005–2007	Nacional		
2007	Bella Vista		
2008	Fénix		
2008	Nacional		
2009	Cerro		
2010	River Plate	12	(5)
2010–2011	Cerro	9	(0)
2012–2013	Heredia	41	(12)
2013–2014	Rampla Juniors	12	(11)
2014	Hebei Zhongji	27	(13)
2015	Beijing BIT	24	(17)
2016	Deportivo Maldonado	8	(0)
2017	Atenas	12	(4)
2017	Plaza Colonia	7	(0)
2024	Club Deportivo y Social Barrio Viña		
- * Club domestic league appearances and goals as of 16 November 2017

Andrés Leonardo Márquez Goytiño (born 3 September 1984, Sarandí del Yi, Uruguay) He is a uruguayan soccer player, who plays as a forward, and his last club was Plaza Colonia of the Primera División de Uruguay.

== Club career ==
Márquez started his football career at Nacional in 2005. He transferred to China League One side Hebei Zhongji on 27 January 2014.
