= Hao Haitao =

Chinese footballer and coach

Personal information
- Full name: Hao Haitao
- Date of birth: December 3, 1968 (age 57)
- Place of birth: Qingdao, Shandong, China
- Position: Right back

Senior career*
Years	Team	Apps	(Gls)
1994–1996	Qingdao Manatee		
1997–2000	Shanghai Pudong		
1998	→ Tianjin Teda (loan)		

Managerial career
- 2005: Shanghai The 9 (Assist)
- 2006: Shanghai United (Assist)
- 2007–2010: Shanghai Shenhua (Assist)
- 2011: Tianjin Songjiang (Assist)
- 2012: Tianjin Songjiang
- 2013: Chengdu Blades
- 2018: Chongqing Lifan (caretaker)
- 2019: Guizhou Hengfeng
- * Club domestic league appearances and goals

Hao Haitao (Chinese: 郝海涛, born December 3, 1968) is a Chinese football coach and a former football player. He last managed Guizhou Hengfeng. He previously played for Qingdao Manatee, Shanghai Pudong and Tianjin Teda. After retiring, he would move into assistant management before becoming the head coach of Tianjin Songjiang and Chengdu Blades F.C. Hao haitao and former China national player Hao Haidong are cousins.

== Club career ==
Hao Haitao and his cousin Hao Haidong were first scouted by the top military football team Bayi FC as youngsters. He, however, missed the chance as he have to play for Qingdao, but Hao Haidong was signed instead. He later joined Nanjing Army football club. By 1994 the Chinese FA demanded full professionalism and Hao Haitao joined second tier club Qingdao Manatee where he saw the club win the division title and promotion to the top tier. The following season saw Qingdao struggle within the top division and Hao would be part of the squad that finished eleventh at the end of the season and in the relegation zone.

=== Shanghai Pudong ===
While Qingdao would go on to win back promotion the following season, Hao moved to another second tier football club Shanghai Pudong at the beginning of the 1997 league season. The team relegated in the 1997 season.

=== Tianjin TEDA ===
Hao was loaned out to second tier club Tianjin Teda in 1998. With Tianjin Teda in the 1998 league season Hao would have an extremely successful loan period when he went on to win the division title with the club at the end of the season. Hao would return to Shanghai Pudong the following season where he spent a further two seasons playing for them before he would retire.

== Managerial career ==
Hao worked as assistant manager in Shanghai for a period of time. In 2011, Hao joined Tianjin Songjiang as the assistant manager of Patrick de Wilde, and replaced the Belgian during the season in June.

In 2013, he moved to Chengdu Blades as the head coach. His position was soon replaced in April due to reported conflicts with players.

Hao returned to Tianjin in 2016 to manage the Tianjin Quanjian youth team.

Hao joined Chongqing Lifan by the end of 2017 season as assistant manager. As Paulo Bento was sacked on 23 July 2018, he took the position as the caretaker, but resigned after 3 losses.

In the 2019 season, Hao signed with Guizhou Hengfeng. He served as caretaker for 1 match, and became the official head coach on 9 April 2019.

== Honours ==
As a player

Qingdao Manatee

- Jia B League: 1994

Tianjin Teda

- Jia B League: 1998
