= Lee Jae-min =

South Korean footballer (born 1987)

Lee Jae-Min
Personal information
- Full name: Lee Jae-Min
- Date of birth: 29 May 1987 (age 39)
- Place of birth: Bucheon, Gyeonggi, South Korea
- Height: 1.77 m (5 ft 9 1/2 in)
- Position: Forward

Youth career
- 2006–2009: Korea University

Senior career*
Years	Team	Apps	(Gls)
2010	Ulsan Hyundai Mipo Dolphin	13	(5)
2010–2011	Vissel Kobe	16	(0)
2011–2012	Ulsan Hyundai Mipo Dolphin	36	(13)
2013	Yanbian Baekdu Tigers	27	(18)
2014	Bangkok F.C.		
2017	Gimhae FC		
2018	Hwaseong FC		
2020–	Byuksan FC		
- * Club domestic league appearances and goals as of 7 December 2011

Lee Jae-Min (Korean: 이재민; born 29 May 1987) is a South Korean footballer who plays as forward for Byuksan FC.

== Football career ==
Lee was a member of the Beograd Universiade national team when he studied in Korea University.

In 2010, Lee joined Korea National League club Ulsan Hyundai Mipo Dockyard. In July of the same year, he moved to Japanese club Vissel Kobe.

On 18 May 2011, he was released from Kobe, two days after being arrested for drunk driving.

In 2012 K-National League season, he was the top goal scorer by playing 24 games and scored 12 goals for Ulsan Hyundai Mipo Dockyard.

Lee joined China League One club Yanbian Baekdu Tigers F.C. on 29 January 2013.

== Club statistics ==
As of 7 December 2011

Club performance			League		Cup		League Cup		Total	
Season	Club	League	Apps	Goals	Apps	Goals	Apps	Goals	Apps	Goals
Korea Republic			League		FA Cup		K-League Cup		Total	
2010	Ulsan Hyundai Mipo	Korea National League	13	5	1	0	-		14	5
Japan			League		Emperor's Cup		J.League Cup		Total	
2010	Vissel Kobe	J1 League	13	0	1	0	0	0	14	0
2011	Vissel Kobe	J1 League	3	0	0	0	0	0	3	0
Korea Republic			League		FA Cup		K-League Cup		Total	
2011	Ulsan Hyundai Mipo	Korea National League	12	1	0	0	-		12	1
Country	Korea Republic		25	6	1	0	-		26	6
Country	Japan		16	0	1	0	0	0	17	0
Total			41	6	2	0	0	0	43	6
