= Li Shangwen =

Chinese footballer

Li Shangwen 李尚文
Personal information
- Date of birth: June 20, 1992 (age 34)
- Place of birth: Hunchun, Yanbian, Jilin, China
- Height: 1.77 m (5 ft 9 1/2 in)
- Position: Forward

Team information
- Current team: Changchun Shenhua

Youth career
- Changchun Yatai

Senior career*
Years	Team	Apps	(Gls)
2011–	Changchun Yatai	15	(0)
2014	→ Lijiang Jiayunhao (loan)	5	(0)
2018	→ Sichuan Jiuniu (loan)	10	(0)
2021	→ Xi'an Wolves (loan)	9	(0)
2022-	Changchun Shenhua	0	(0)
- * Club domestic league appearances and goals as of 15 May 2022

Li Shangwen (Chinese: 李尚文; pinyin: Lǐ Shàngwén; born 20 June 1992), former name Li Shang (Chinese: 李尚, Korean: 리상), is a Chinese football player of Korean descent who currently plays for Chinese club Changchun Shenhua.

== Club career ==
Li started his professional football career in 2011 when he was promoted to Chinese Super League side Changchun Yatai's first team. He did not appear for Changchun in the 2011 and 2012 league season. On 27 April 2013, he made his senior debut in a 0–0 away draw against Jiangsu Sainty, coming on as a substitute for Cao Tianbao in the 76th minute. In July 2014, Li was loaned to China League Two side Lijiang Jiayunhao until 31 December 2014. He was loaned to League Two side Sichuan Jiuniu for half season in July 2018. On 14 July 2018, he made his debut for the club in a 3–0 home defeat against Shenzhen Pengcheng.

== Personal life ==
Li Shang's twin elder brother Li Guangwen is also a professional footballer. They played together in Changchun Yatai.

== Career statistics ==
Statistics accurate as of match played 31 December 2020.

Appearances and goals by club, season and competition
Club	Season	League			National Cup		Continental		Other		Total	
Club	Season	Division	Apps	Goals	Apps	Goals	Apps	Goals	Apps	Goals	Apps	Goals
Changchun Yatai	2011	Chinese Super League	0	0	0	0	-		-		0	0
Changchun Yatai	2012	Chinese Super League	0	0	0	0	-		-		0	0
Changchun Yatai	2013	Chinese Super League	1	0	0	0	-		-		1	0
Changchun Yatai	2015	Chinese Super League	12	0	1	0	-		-		13	0
Changchun Yatai	2016	Chinese Super League	0	0	1	0	-		-		1	0
Changchun Yatai	2017	Chinese Super League	2	0	0	0	-		-		2	0
Changchun Yatai	2018	Chinese Super League	0	0	1	0	-		-		1	0
Changchun Yatai	Total		15	0	3	0	0	0	0	0	18	0
Lijiang Jiayunhao (loan)	2014	China League Two	5	0	0	0	-		-		5	0
Sichuan Jiuniu (loan)	2018	China League Two	7	0	2	0	-		-		9	0
Career total			27	0	5	0	0	0	0	0	32	0
