= Hunan Billows F.C. =

Chinese football club

Hunan Billows Húnán Xiāngtāo 湖南湘涛
- Full name: Hunan Billows Football Club 湖南湘涛足球俱乐部
- Founded: 26 December 2006; 19 years ago
- Dissolved: 6 January 2025; 22 months ago
- Ground: Loudi Sports Center, Loudi
- Capacity: 30,000
- Chairman: Li Jingman
- Manager: Jia Hong
- 2024: China League Two, 8th of 20 (expelled from league)
Home colours	Away colours

Hunan Billows Football Club (Chinese: 湖南湘涛足球俱乐部; pinyin: Húnán Xiāngtāo Zúqiú Jùlèbù) was a Chinese professional football club based in Changsha, Hunan. Historically, Hunan Billows has played its home matches at various grounds across their home province, and last played at the Loudi Sports Center in Loudi, Hunan. Their majority shareholders were the Hunan Provincial Sports Bureau and high-tech industry company Hunan Corun New Energy Co. Ltd.

The club was founded on December 26, 2006, and won the 2009 Chinese League Two title and promotion to the Chinese League One division, but was relegated back after the 2016 season.

== History ==
=== Formation ===
To preserve the representation of Hunan province in the Chinese football league pyramid after the dissolution of Hunan Shoking, the local Hunan Provincial Sports Bureau decided that it would be best to invest in a new team for the area. On December 26, 2006, a new team was formed to participate in the 2007 league season called Hunan Billows F.C. with Xiong Ni returning as their chairman and Li Kejia returning as their manager. Now playing within the 6,000-seat Hunan Provincial People's Stadium. The team was completely rebuilt and played their first league game against Sichuan FC in a 1–0 defeat. Throughout the season the club's results improved and the team finished third in the Southern division. They made the play-offs but were knocked out in the second round. With a further investment of six million Yuan from the local Hunan government sports body, in the following season results the club gained another play-off position. Again they were knocked out in the second round. By the 2009 league season and with the continued investment of the local Hunan government sports body and of the management of Men Wenfeng, the club won the division title after they beat local rivals Hubei Luyin in the playoff final to win the division title. In the second tier again, they moved back into the Helong Stadium and hired Zhao Faqing as their new manager at the beginning of the 2010 league season. The season began well for the club and they looked like genuine promotion contenders. Conflicts between the Hunan and the Hubei Greenery fans during their May 14 game seemed to derail their promotion push. They finished the season in sixth. The next season they moved into the 20,000-seat Central South University Stadium and brought in Miloš Hrstić to manage them. Miloš Hrstić's leadership improved the team's ranking at the end of the 2011 league season slightly – they finished fourth. He left the club at the end of the season and was replaced by his assistant coach Zhang Xu. In preparation for the 2012 league season the club brought in several high-profile players such as Honduras internationals Emil Martínez and Erick Norales and Chinese international Dong Fangzhuo in their hopes to win promotion. The recruitment for not result in promotion that season, but it brought an increase in investment in from the Hunan Liuyang River Wine Winery Industry Co., Ltd., Zoomlion Company Limited, Central South Publishing & Media Group Co., Ltd., Kelme and the return of Hunan Corun New Energy co. ltd.

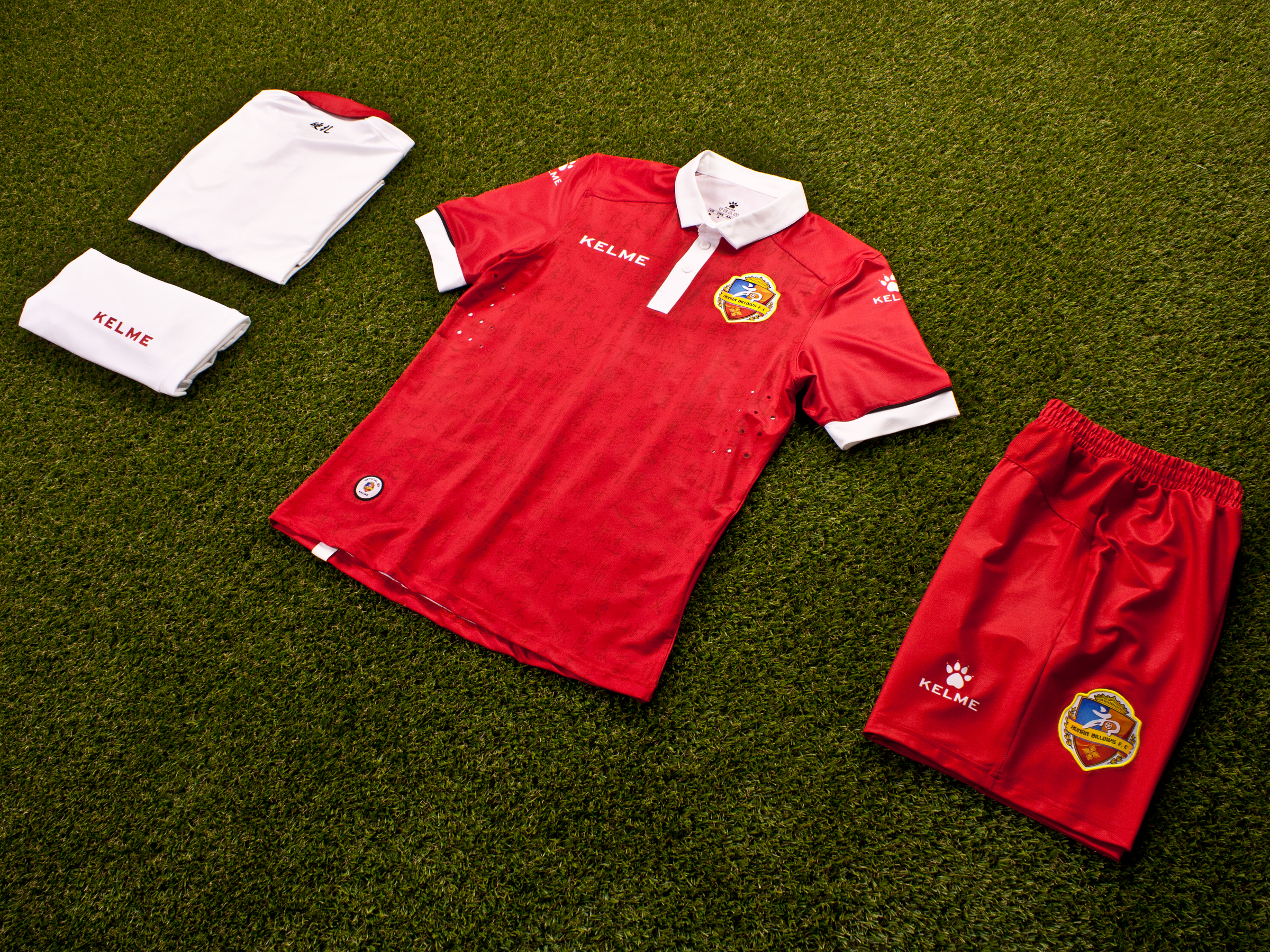
Hunan Billows FC football shirt in 2016

Hunan declined in the mid-2010s and were relegated back to League Two in 2016.

On January 6, 2025, the club announced its exit from the Chinese Football Professional League and was disbanded as a result of failing to gain access for the new season.

== Grounds ==
The team have played in several stadiums throughout their history. When they were formed they predominantly used the 55,000-seat Helong Stadium in Changsha for their important matches. The more modest 6,000-seat Hunan Provincial People's Stadium which is also located in Changsha was used for their smaller games. With the club in financial difficulties the cost of renting the Helong Stadium led the team to move permanently into the Hunan Provincial People's Stadium. They started there when the club was reformed and they were playing in the third tier. When they won promotion back into the second tier, the Helong Stadium was an option for a brief period before 2011 when they have predominantly used the 20,000-seat Central South University Stadium in Changsha as their main stadium.

== Players ==
=== Current squad ===
As of 5 March 2024

Note: Flags indicate national team as defined under FIFA eligibility rules; some limited exceptions apply. Players may hold more than one non-FIFA nationality.

No.	Pos.	Nation	Player
3	DF	CHN	Liu Qing
4	FW	CHN	Xu Jiang
5	DF	CHN	Ou Li
6	DF	CHN	Qin Zhenkang
7	MF	CHN	Liu Peilin
8	MF	CHN	Wang Yuxuan
9	FW	CHN	He Yaqi
12	DF	CHN	Zhang Chenlong
13	MF	CHN	Wu Xiaotian
15	DF	CHN	Miao Huaxu
41	DF	CHN	Lu Jiatong
42	MF	CHN	Tan Yu
43	MF	CHN	Wang Kuifeng
44	DF	CHN	Zhou Xuan
45	DF	CHN	Song Yanbin

No.	Pos.	Nation	Player
47	DF	CHN	Peng Bo
48	FW	CHN	Nie Xinlei
49	MF	CHN	Wu Qinghua
50	DF	CHN	Zhang Xiaoming
51	DF	CHN	Yin Ruirui
52	FW	CHN	Wang Bo
54	MF	CHN	Sun Qi
55	DF	CHN	Xia Shichao
56	DF	CHN	Liu Guanjun
57	DF	CHN	Li Zhihao
58	FW	CHN	Huang Haotian
59	DF	CHN	Wang Bin
60	MF	CHN	Tan Youchuan
62	MF	CHN	Zhang Hanwen
50	GK	CHN	Yan Zhicheng
—	GK	CHN	Dong Jianhong
—	GK	CHN	Wang Zixuan
—	DF	CHN	Zu Pengchao
—	DF	CHN	Jiang Zhe
—	DF	CHN	Liu Jing
—	DF	CHN	Chen Fangzhou
—	DF	CHN	Chen Ao (at Qingdao West Coast)
—	MF	CHN	Xu Zhaoji
—	MF	CHN	Qeyser Tursun
—	FW	CHN	Wei Zhenghong

== Coaching staff ==
Position	Staff
Head coach	(China) Jia Hong
Assistant coach	
Goalkeeping Coach	
Fitness coach	
Team Physician	

Source: sina.com

=== Managerial history ===
- (China) Li Kejia 26 December 2006 – 2008
- (China) Men Wenfeng 2009
- (China) Zhao Faqing 2009–19 December 2009
- (Croatia) Miloš Hrstić 19 December 2009 – 1 November 2011
- (China) Zhang Xu 1 November 2011 – 11 December 2012
- (Croatia) Dražen Besek 11 December 2012 – 25 July 2013
- (China) Huang Cheng (Caretaker) 25 July 2013 – 27 November 2014
- (Bulgaria) Aleksandar Stankov 27 November 2014 – 2 May 2015
- (China) Zhang Xu (caretaker) 2 May 2015 – 6 August 2015
- (North Macedonia) Žikica Tasevski 6 August 2015 – 1 November 2015
- (Slovenia) Tomaž Kavčič 30 November 2015 – 28 May 2016
- (China) Huang Xiangdong (caretaker) 28 May 2016 – 31 December 2016
- (China) Zhang Xu 1 January 2017 – 27 May 2017
- (Bosnia and Herzegovina) Vladimir Slišković 3 February 2017 – 26 August 2017
- (China) Li Hongwu (caretaker) 27 May 2017 – 23 June 2017
- (Belgium) Patrick de Wilde 23 June 2017 – 5 December 2017
- (China) Pei Encai 22 February 2018 – 7 July 2018
- (China) Sun Wei 7 July 2018 – 25 February 2019
- (China) Tang Jing 25 February 2019 – 2 June 2020
- (China) Wang Chen 2 June 2020 – 31 December 2020
- (China) Jia Hong 1 January 2021 –

== Results ==
All-time league rankings

- As of the end of 2019 season.

Year	Div	Pld	W	D	L	GF	GA	GD	Pts	Pos.	FA Cup	Super Cup	AFC	Att./G	Stadium
2007	3	14	5	4	5	15	16	−1	16 ^{1}	8	NH	DNQ	DNQ		Hunan Provincial People's Stadium
2008	3	16	10	1	5	23	14	19	28 ^{1}	6	NH	DNQ	DNQ		Hunan Provincial People's Stadium
2009	3	17	6	9	2	30	17	13	15 ^{1}	W	NH	DNQ	DNQ		Hunan Provincial People's Stadium
2010	2	24	10	5	9	21	24	−3	35	6	NH	DNQ	DNQ		Hunan Provincial People's Stadium
2011	2	26	12	6	8	39	35	4	42	4	R1	DNQ	DNQ		Hunan Provincial People's Stadium; CSUFT East-Garden Stadium
2012	2	30	10	8	12	33	37	−4	38	11	R3	DNQ	DNQ	6,970	CSUFT East-Garden Stadium; Hunan Provincial People's Stadium; Yiyang Olympic Sports Park Stadium
2013	2	30	7	9	14	27	40	−13	30	12	R3	DNQ	DNQ	4,668	Yiyang Olympic Sports Park Stadium; Helong Stadium
2014	2	30	12	9	9	38	33	5	45	6	R3	DNQ	DNQ	5,169	CSUFT East-Garden Stadium; Yiyang Olympic Sports Park Stadium
2015	2	30	8	5	17	32	48	−16	29	14	R2	DNQ	DNQ	4,795	Yiyang Olympic Sports Park Stadium; Helong Stadium
2016	2	30	2	6	22	16	61	−54	12	16	R2	DNQ	DNQ	3,781	Yiyang Olympic Sports Park Stadium
2017	3	24	9	4	11	31	33	−2	31	16	R1	DNQ	DNQ	712	Yiyang Olympic Sports Park Stadium
2018	3	28	10	10	8	43	32	11	40	10	R3	DNQ	DNQ	398	Yiyang Olympic Sports Park Stadium
2019	3	30	5	5	20	17	59	−42	20 ^{1}	28	R2	DNQ	DNQ		Yiyang Olympic Sports Park Stadium

- ^1 In group stage.

Key

	China top division
	China second division
	China third division
W	Winners
RU	Runners-up
3	Third place
	Relegated

- Pld = Played
- W = Games won
- D = Games drawn
- L = Games lost
- F = Goals for
- A = Goals against
- Pts = Points
- Pos = Final position
- DNQ = Did not qualify
- DNE = Did not enter
- NH = Not Held
- – = Does Not Exist
- R1 = Round 1
- R2 = Round 2
- R3 = Round 3
- R4 = Round 4
- F = Final
- SF = Semi-finals
- QF = Quarter-finals
- R16 = Round of 16
- Group = Group stage
- GS2 = Second Group stage
- QR1 = First Qualifying Round
- QR2 = Second Qualifying Round
- QR3 = Third Qualifying Round

== Honours ==
- China League Two (tier-III)
  - Champions (1): 2009
