= Julián Lalinde =

Uruguayan footballer (born 1985)

Personal information
- Full name: Julián Enrique Lalinde Rubio
- Date of birth: 18 December 1985 (age 40)
- Place of birth: Florida, Uruguay
- Height: 1.82 m (6 ft 0 in)
- Position: Forward

Senior career*
Years	Team	Apps	(Gls)
2006–2010	Liverpool	57	(13)
2011	Rampla Juniors	11	(4)
2011	Liverpool	11	(1)
2012	América de Cali	36	(13)
2013	Independiente Santa Fe	8	(2)
2013	Deportivo Pasto	15	(8)
2014	Beijing Baxy	14	(1)
2014–2015	Ferro Carril Oeste	12	(2)
2015	Deportivo Quito	18	(2)
2015	Unión Comercio	13	(1)
2016–2017	Suchitepéquez	19	(7)
2017–2018	Torque	15	(1)
2018–2019	Rampla Juniors	22	(2)
2019	Progreso	10	(2)
- * Club domestic league appearances and goals

Julián Lalinde (Spanish pronunciation: [xuˈljan laˈlinde]; born 18 December 1985) is a Uruguayan retired footballer who played as a striker.

On 12 December 2019, 34-year old Lalinde announced his retirement.

== Career statistics ==
Club	Season	League		Cup		Continental		Total	
Club	Season	Apps	Goals	Apps	Goals	Apps	Goals	Apps	Goals
Liverpool	2005–06	3	0	-	-	-	-	3	0
Liverpool	2006–07	3	0	-	-	-	-	3	0
Liverpool	2007–08	2	0	-	-	-	-	2	0
Liverpool	2008–09	13	4	-	-	-	-	13	4
Liverpool	2009–10	16	6	6	4	1	0	23	10
Liverpool	Total	37	10	6	4	1	0	44	14
Rampla Juniors	2010–11	11	4	-	-	-	-	11	4
Liverpool	2010–11	12	1	-	-	-	-	12	1
Liverpool	2011–12	11	1	-	-	-	-	11	1
Liverpool	Total	23	2	-	-	-	-	23	2
América de Cali	2012	36	13	7	3	-	-	43	12
Independiente Santa Fe	2013	8	1	7	3	1	0	16	4
Deportivo Pasto	2013	15	8	-	-	6	2	21	10
Beijing Baxy	2014	0	0	0	0	-	-	0	0
Ferro Carril Oeste	2014	12	2	0	0	-	-	12	2
Deportivo Quito	2015	16	2	0	0	-	-	16	2
Unión Comercio	2015	15	1	0	0	-	-	15	1
Career total		173	43	20	10	8	2	201	51
