= Gianni Bortoletto =

Italian football manager (born 1956)

Personal information
- Date of birth: 4 May 1956 (age 70)
- Place of birth: Italy

Managerial career
- Years: Team
- 1988-1989: Santa Lucia di Piave Calcio
- 1991: A.C.D. Treviso
- 1993-1994: Laives
- 1994-1999: A.C. Trento S.C.S.D.
- 2003-2004: Fermana F.C.
- 2004-2005: A.C. Belluno 1905
- 2009-2010: Africa Sports d'Abidjan
- 2011: A.S.D. Sacilese Calcio
- 2014: Tianjin Tianhai F.C.

Gianni Bortoletto (born 4 May 1956 in Italy) is an Italian football manager.
