= Patrick Aussems =

Belgian football coach and former player

Personal information
- Full name: Patrick Winand J. Aussems
- Date of birth: 6 February 1965 (age 61)
- Place of birth: Moelingen, Belgium
- Height: 2.09 m (6 ft 10 1/2 in)
- Position: Defender

Senior career*
Years	Team	Apps	(Gls)
1974–1981	RCS Visé		
1981–1988	Standard Liège		
1988–1989	Gent		
1989–1990	RFC Seraing		
1990–1993	Troyes		

Managerial career
- 1992: Troyes
- 1995–1999: Saint-Louisienne
- 1999–2001: Capricorne Saint-Pierre
- 2002–2003: Stade Beaucairois
- 2003–2004: Stade Reims
- 2004–2005: KSA Cameroon
- 2005–2006: Angers
- 2009–2010: Évian
- 2011–2012: Shenzhen Ruby
- 2012–2013: Chengdu Blades
- 2013–2014: AC Léopards
- 2014–2015: Al Hilal (Omdurman)
- 2015–2016: Nepal
- 2017–2018: Marbella United
- 2018–2019: Simba S.C.
- 2020–2021: Black Leopards
- 2021–2023: A.F.C. Leopards
- * Club domestic league appearances and goals

Patrick Aussems (born 6 February 1965 in Moelingen, Belgium) is a former Belgian footballer and manager.

== Biography ==
=== Playing career ===
This large player (1m 90) changed as defender mainly Standard Liege. It was played several Belgian international and European Cup encounters with the Standard. After going through AA Gent, he continued his career at Troyes before finishing his playing career in Reunion winning many titles with Saint Louisienne.

=== Management ===
Holder his coaching qualifications he then drives The Capricorn (Reunion) and Beaucaire (National, France). After being coach of the professional team of the Kadji Sport Academy (Cameroon), he joined the professional staff of SCO Angers. In 2006, he became the Technical Director CIFAS Benin in Cotonou before becoming, in 2007, the National Technical Director of the Benin Football Federation and national coach. During his mandate, the Benin participate in three CAN (African Cup of Nations) successive, a real performance for this small country in West Africa.

In 2009, he joined the Haute-Savoie and became coach in Évian Thonon Gaillard Football Club, the then National. The ETG National champion and ends accesses the L2 then L1. It is then, for two seasons, coached Shenzhen Ruby FC (Chinese Super League), flagship club of this Chinese metropolis, located near Hong Kong. Since April 2013, and the sacking of the Chinese coach, Patrick AUSSEMS became the head coach of FC CHENGDU BLADES (China) with the mission to keep the club's flagship SICHUAN Province in China League One. The insured retention, Patrick AUSSEMS left China in January 2014 and became head coach of AC LEOPARD Dolisie in Congo - Brazzaville with which it is engaged in African Champions League. Champion of the Congo in 2014 with 13 points ahead, no losses and only 1 goal conceded, AC LEOPARD, after finishing first in Group A of the Confederation Cup, failed in semi final of the AFC Cup 2014 face Séwé in Sport. Out of contract, Patrick AUSSEMS pledged for 2015 season with AL Hilal, the Sudanese club giant Khartoum but he decided to leave the club after a few months as a result of differences of opinion with its leaders, despite qualification African Champions League, Super Cup victory of Sudan and the 1st place in the national championship without having conceded a goal!

=== Simba SC, Tanzania and Patrick Aussems ===
In 2018 Aussems became the head coach of Simba S.C. the 2017/18 champions of the Tanzanian Premier League. The Tanzanian giants were ambitious and wanted to become one of the top 5 club teams in Africa. The Belgian coach was hired to bring his experience in continental competitions and targeted winning the Champions League.

Aussems guided Simba S.C. to the Tanzanian Premier League title in 2018/19 and reached the quarter finals of the African Champions League, losing out to TP Mazembe 4–1 over 2 legs. Aussems signed a new 1-year contract to continue as head coach for the 2019/20 season.

In November 2019, Simba SC confirmed parting ways with the Belgian coach on mutual consent.

== Career ==
- RCS Visé (1974–1981)
- Standard Liège (1981–1988)
- KAA Gent (1988–1989)
- RFC Seraing (1989–1990)
- ES Troyes AC (1990–1993)

== Coaching career ==
- ES Troyes AC (1992)
- Sainte-Louisienne (1995–1999)
- Capricorne Saint-Pierre (1999–2001)
- Stade Beaucairois (2002–2003)
- Stade de Reims (2003–2004)
- KSA Cameroon (2004–2005)
- SCO Angers (2005–2006)
- Benin (Technical director / National selection ) (2006–2009)
- Evian Thonon Gaillard F.C. (2009–2010)
- Shenzhen Ruby (2011–2012)
- Chengdu Blades (2012–2013)
- AC Léopards (2013–2014)
- Al Hilal (Omdurman) (2014–2015)
- Nepal (2015–2016)
- Marbella United FC (2017–2018)
- Simba S.C. (2018–19)
- Black Leopards (2020–2021
- AFC Leopards (2021-
