= Yao Xia =

Chinese footballer and coach

Yao Xia 姚夏
Personal information
- Full name: Yao Xia
- Date of birth: 28 January 1974 (age 52)
- Place of birth: Chongqing, Sichuan, China
- Height: 1.72 m (5 ft 7 1/2 in)
- Positions: Attacking midfielder; striker

Senior career*
Years	Team	Apps	(Gls)
1991–2002	Sichuan Quanxing	187	(46)
2003–2004	Qingdao Etsong	47	(6)
2005	→ Chengdu Wuniu (loan)	11	(4)
2006–2010	Chengdu Blades	107	(10)
2014	Chengdu Tiancheng	2	(1)

International career
1993–2000	China	28	(4)

Managerial career
- 2010–2011: Chengdu Blades (vice general manager)
- 2012: Chengdu Blades (caretaker)
- 2013: Chengdu Blades (caretaker)
- 2016–2017: Chongqing Lifan (general manager)
- 2018–: Chengdu Rongcheng (vice general manager)
Medal record
Men's football
Asian Games
Bronze medal – third place	1998 Bangkok	Football
AFC U-16 Championship
Gold medal – first place	1992 Saudi Arabia	Team
- * Club domestic league appearances and goals

Yao Xia (Simplified Chinese: 姚夏; Pinyin: Yáo Xià) (born 28 January 1974) is a Chinese football coach and a former international footballer who played as an attacking midfielder or striker.

As a youngster he would make a name for himself with Sichuan Quanxing where due to his speed he was nicknamed Cheetah ("猎豹") by the fans. After leaving the club he moved to Qingdao Etsong before settling within another Sichuan province football team with Chengdu Blades where he stayed for several seasons until he retired from playing.

== Biography ==
=== Club ===
Yao Xia started his football career at Sichuan Quanxing and was part of the team that saw the club become a professional unit at the beginning of the 1994 Chinese football league season. He would rise to prominence at the end of the 1995 football league season when he played a large part in the fight against relegation for Sichuan Quanxing who survived on goal difference. From then on Yao was part of Sichuan's most successful team which came third in the 1999 top tier division, which also saw him score 11 goals and saw him personally some third within the goal scoring charts. The following season saw Sichuan once again finish third within the 2000 league season, however by 2002 Sichuan went through a disruptive ownership dispute and Yao Xia decided to leave at the end of the league campaign.

Surprisingly Yao Xia moved to Qingdao Etsong at the beginning of the 2003 football league season, a team he helped relegate in the 1995 league season. His time at Qingdao was fairly disappointing, despite playing a large part within the team Qingdao were constantly flirting with relegating and Yao was eventually loaned out to second tier football club Chengdu Wuniu. The move back to a Sichuan province football club seemed to be a personally fairly successful transfer and by the following season he would make his move permanent while the club renamed themselves Chengdu Blades. After several seasons of improving results Yao would be a vital part of the squad that won promotion to the top tier when the club came runners-up in the 2007 league campaign. Despite his advancing age Yao would still remain a constant regular within the team and his experience would help guide Chengdu to become a regular mid-table club until the end of the 2009 league season saw the club relegated when it was discovered that Chengdu Blades fixed several games during their promotion campaign and were relegated to the second tier at the beginning of the 2010 league season, nevertheless Yao decided to stay loyal and remained with the club.

Since his retirement in October 2010, his shirt number of 18 has been retired in honour of his contribution to Sichuan football by Chengdu Blades. Yao Xia's time at Chengdu Blades would further continue when he took the team leader and deputy general manager position soon afterwards before coming in as the club's caretaker manager on December 7, 2012 where he took over the club's training during the off season. On September 16, 2013 Yao was asked to once again take on the management position when the club fired Patrick Aussems after a string of results saw the club in the relegation zone, his appointment saw the club immediately win two games in a row against Yanbian Baekdu Tigers F.C. and BIT F.C.

Yao made his comeback in July 2014 after Korean manager Lee Jang-Soo took charge Chengdu Tiancheng who struggled in the bottom of the league.

In 2018, Yao was appointed as the management of newly formed football club in Chengdu, Chengdu Better City

=== International ===
Yao Xia would make his international debut against Mexico in a 3-0 loss in a friendly game on the third of November 1993. Once Yao Xia became a regular at Sichuan he would also quickly establish himself as a regular for the national team as well and play a major part in China's unsuccessful 1998 FIFA World Cup qualification campaign. He would have more success when he was able to help China qualify for the 2000 AFC Asian Cup, however while playing a major part in qualification he was left out of the squad to actually go to the tournament. He would play his last game against Yugoslavia on March 25, 2000 in a 1-0 friendly loss.
