= Martín Colombo =

Uruguayan footballer (born 1985)

Personal information
- Full name: Rubens Martin Colombo Rivero
- Date of birth: 12 April 1985 (age 41)
- Place of birth: Mercedes, Uruguay
- Height: 1.82 m (6 ft 0 in)
- Position: Forward

Team information
- Current team: Deportivo Madryn

Senior career*
Years	Team	Apps	(Gls)
2003–2004	River Plate	?	(?)
2004–2009	Cerrito	?	(29)
2009–2010	Voghera	26	(17)
2010–2011	Derthona	33	(20)
2011–2012	A.C. Voghera	15	(2)
2012–2013	A.S.D. Città di Marino Calcio	13	(1)
2013–2014	Plaza Colonia	27	(10)
2014	B.I.T.	16	(3)
2015–	Deportivo Madryn		
- * Club domestic league appearances and goals as of 12 November 2014

Rubens Martín Colombo Rivero (Spanish pronunciation: [maɾˈtiŋ koˈlombo]; (Note: In isolation, Martín is pronounced [maɾˈtin].) born 12 April 1985) is a Uruguayan footballer who plays as a forward.
