= Givestin N'Suki =

Angolan footballer

N'Suki
Personal information
- Full name: Zantu Givestin N'Suki
- Date of birth: 24 July 1990 (age 36)
- Place of birth: Luanda, Angola
- Position: Striker

Senior career*
Years	Team	Apps	(Gls)
2011–2012	Juve Stabia	2	(0)
2012–2013	Sorrento Calcio	9	(0)
2014	Hebei Zhongji	13	(3)
- * Club domestic league appearances and goals as of 12 November 2014 ‡ National team caps and goals as of 10 June 2013

Zantu Givestin N'Suki (born 24 July 1990) is an Angolan professional footballer who plays as a striker. who currently plays for Hebei Zhongji in the China League One.

== Club career ==
On 31 July 2014, N'Suki transferred to China League One side Hebei Zhongji.
