= Marcos Neves =

Brazilian footballer

Personal information
- Full name: Marcos Neves de Souza
- Date of birth: May 22, 1988 (age 38)
- Place of birth: Paraíso do Tocantins, Brazil
- Height: 1.75 m (5 ft 9 in)
- Position: Striker

Senior career*
Years	Team	Apps	(Gls)
2011	Guarani	?	(?)
2011–2013	Cerro Largo	41	(8)
2014	B.I.T.	13	(3)
- * Club domestic league appearances and goals as of 05/02/2012

Marcos Neves de Souza (born May 22, 1988 in Paraíso do Tocantins) is a Brazilian footballer who played in the Argentine Primera División for Cerro Largo.
