= Yiyang Stadium =

Sports venue in Yiyang, China

Coordinates: 28°33′18″N 112°21′07″E

Yiyang Olympic Stadium
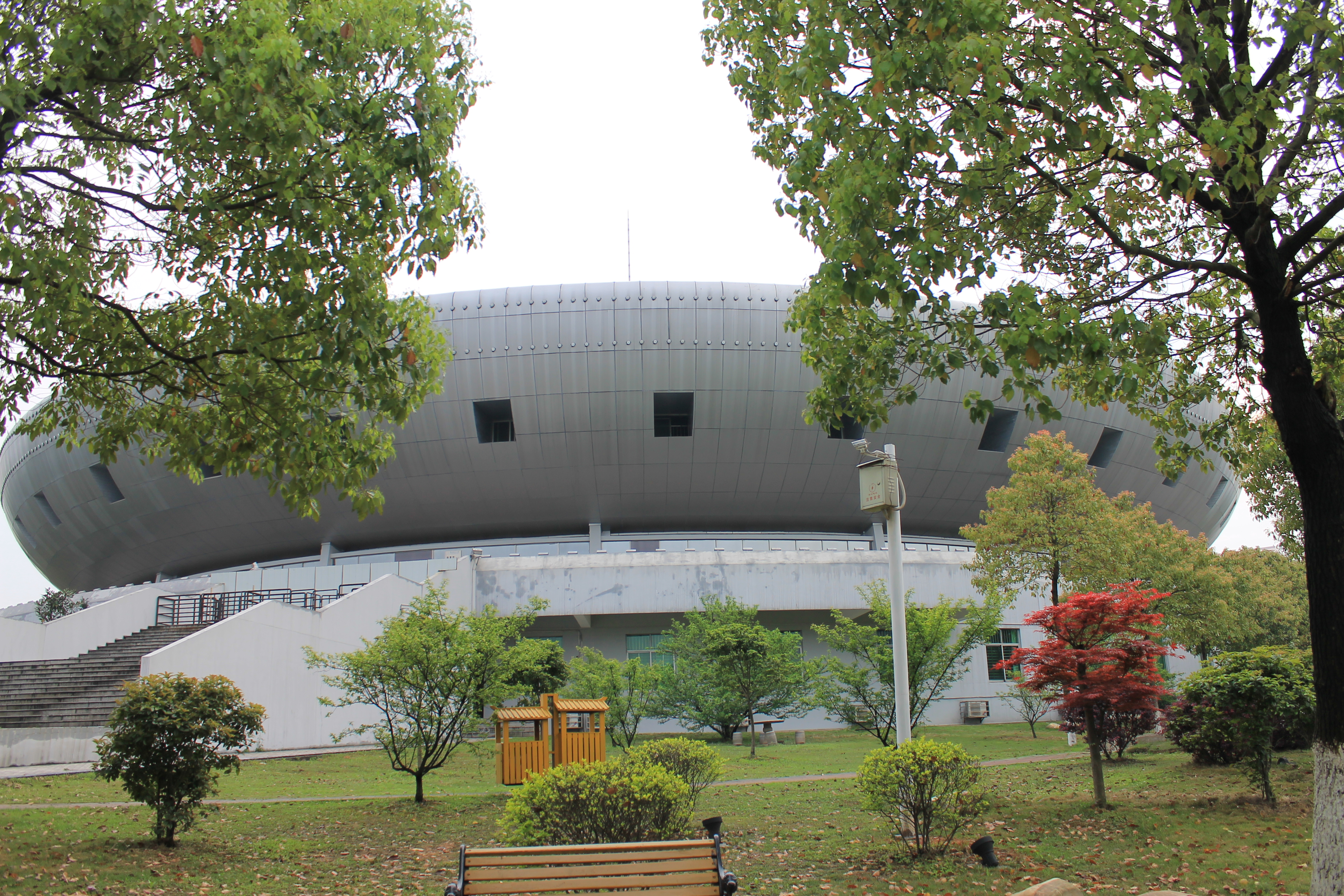
- Yiyang Olympic Stadium, 2012
- Interactive map of Yiyang Olympic Stadium
- Full name: Yiyang Olympic Sports Park Stadium
- Location: Yiyang, China
- Capacity: 30,000

Yiyang (Olympic) Stadium is a multi-purpose stadium in Yiyang, China. It is currently used mostly for football matches. The stadium holds 30,000 spectators.
