= 2013 Chinese Super League =

Chinese Super League
- Season: 2013
- Champions: Guangzhou Evergrande (3rd title)
- Relegated: Qingdao Jonoon; Wuhan Zall
- Champions League: Guangzhou Evergrande; Shandong Luneng; Beijing Guoan; Guizhou Renhe
- Matches: 240
- Goals: 632 (2.63 per match)
- Top goalscorer: Elkeson (24 goals)
- Biggest home win: Beijing Guoan 6–0 Guangzhou R&F (14 September 2013) (6 goals)
- Biggest away win: Shanghai Shenxin 1–6 Shanghai SIPG (2 June 2013) (5 goals)
- Highest scoring: Guangzhou R&F 3–5 Guizhou Renhe (22 September 2013) (8 goals)
- Longest winning run: Guangzhou Evergrande (8 matches)
- Longest unbeaten run: Guangzhou Evergrande (22 matches)
- Longest winless run: Qingdao Jonoon (15 matches)
- Longest losing run: Qingdao Jonoon (7 matches)
- Highest attendance: 58,792; Jiangsu Sainty 1–2 Guangzhou Evergrande (14 Jul. 2013)
- Lowest attendance: 2,760; Dalian Aerbin 1–0 Hangzhou Greentown (3 Nov. 2013)
- Average attendance: 18,571

The 2013 Chinese Super League was the tenth season since the establishment of the Chinese Super League, the 20th season of a professional football league and the 52nd top-tier league season in China. Guangzhou Evergrande won their third consecutive title with an 18-point advantage ahead of runners-up Shandong Luneng.

== Promotion and relegation ==
Teams promoted from 2012 China League One

- Shanghai Tellace (renamed to Shanghai Dongya)
- Wuhan Zall

Teams disbanded

- Dalian Shide (withdrew from the league pyramid)

Teams relegated to 2013 China League One

- Henan Jianye

== Clubs ==
=== Clubs and locations ===
Club	Head coach	City	Stadium	Capacity	2012 season
Beijing Guoan	(Serbia) Aleksandar Stanojević	Beijing	Workers' Stadium	66,161	3rd
Changchun Yatai	(Serbia) Svetozar Šapurić	Changchun	Development Area Stadium	25,000	6th
Dalian Aerbin	(Bosnia and Herzegovina) Simo Krunić	Dalian	Jinzhou Stadium	30,775	5th
Guangzhou Evergrande ^{TH}	(Italy) Marcello Lippi	Guangzhou	Tianhe Stadium	58,500	1st
Guangzhou R&F	(Sweden) Sven-Göran Eriksson	Guangzhou	Yuexiushan Stadium	18,000	7th
Guizhou Renhe	(China) Gong Lei (caretaker)	Guiyang	Guiyang Olympic Sports Center	51,636	4th
Hangzhou Greentown	(Japan) Takeshi Okada	Hangzhou	Huanglong Sports Center	52,672	11th
Jiangsu Sainty	(Serbia) Dragan Okuka	Nanjing	Nanjing Olympic Sports Centre; Zhenjiang Sports and Exhibition Center (from Round 20)	61,443; 30,000	2nd
Liaoning Whowin	(China) Ma Lin	Shenyang	Tiexi New District Sports Center	30,000	10th
Qingdao Jonoon	(Serbia) Goran Stevanović	Qingdao	Qingdao Tiantai Stadium	20,525	13th
Shandong Luneng	(Serbia) Radomir Antić	Jinan	Jinan Olympic Sports Center Stadium	56,808	12th
Shanghai Dongya ^{P}	(China) Gao Hongbo	Shanghai	Shanghai Stadium	56,842	CL1, 1st
Shanghai Shenhua	(China) Shen Xiangfu	Shanghai	Hongkou Football Stadium	33,060	9th
Shanghai Shenxin	(China) Guo Guangqi (caretaker)	Shanghai	Yuanshen Sports Centre Stadium	16,000	15th
Tianjin TEDA	(Costa Rica) Alexandre Guimarães	Tianjin	Tianjin Olympic Centre; TEDA Soccer Stadium (from Round 19)	54,696; 37,450	8th
Wuhan Zall ^{P}	(China) Wang Jun (caretaker)	Wuhan	Wuhan Sports Center	52,357	CL1, 2nd

Location of teams in 2013 Chinese Super League

=== Managerial changes ===
Team	Outgoing manager	Manner of departure	Date of vacancy	Table	Incoming manager	Date of appointment
Beijing Guoan	(Portugal) Jaime Pacheco	Sacked	26 November 2012	N/A	(Serbia) Aleksandar Stanojević	28 November 2012
Dalian Aerbin	(Serbia) Aleksandar Stanojević	Resigned	19 November 2012	N/A	(China) Xu Hong	11 December 2012
Guizhou Renhe	(China) Gao Hongbo	Resigned	17 December 2012	N/A	(China) Gong Lei (caretaker)	17 December 2012
Shandong Luneng	(China) Wu Jingui (caretaker)	Technical assistant	3 November 2012	N/A	(Serbia) Radomir Antić	25 December 2012
Changchun Yatai	(Serbia) Svetozar Šapurić	Sacked	27 December 2012	N/A	(China) Li Shubin	27 December 2012
Dalian Aerbin	(China) Xu Hong	Resigned	18 February 2013	N/A	(China) Li Ming (caretaker)	18 February 2013
Shanghai Dongya	(China) Jiang Bingyao	Fitness coach	27 February 2013	N/A	(China) Gao Hongbo	27 February 2013
Wuhan Zall	(China) Zheng Xiong	Resigned	21 April 2013	15th	(Serbia) Ljubiša Tumbaković	22 April 2013
Guangzhou R&F	(Brazil) Sérgio Farias	Sacked	19 May 2013	13th	(China) Li Bing (caretaker)	19 May 2013
Changchun Yatai	(China) Li Shubin	Resigned	20 May 2013	15th	(Serbia) Svetozar Šapurić	20 May 2013
Dalian Aerbin	(China) Li Ming (caretaker)	Club director	3 June 2013	7th	(Bosnia and Herzegovina) Simo Krunić	3 June 2013
Guangzhou R&F	(China) Li Bing (caretaker)	Technical assistant	4 June 2013	13th	(Sweden) Sven-Göran Eriksson	4 June 2013
Shanghai Shenhua	(Argentina) Sergio Batista	Resigned	4 July 2013	13th	(China) Shen Xiangfu	4 July 2013
Shanghai Shenxin	(China) Zhu Jiong	Sacked	7 July 2013	13th	(China) Guo Guangqi (caretaker)	7 July 2013
Wuhan Zall	(Serbia) Ljubiša Tumbaković	Sacked	18 August 2013	16th	(China) Wang Jun (caretaker)	19 August 2013
Qingdao Jonoon	(South Korea) Chang Woe-ryong	Sacked	20 August 2013	10th	(China) Li Yingfa (caretaker)	20 August 2013
Qingdao Jonoon	(China) Li Yingfa (caretaker)	–	5 September 2013	13th	(Serbia) Goran Stevanović	5 September 2013

=== Foreign players ===
The number of foreign players is restricted to five per CSL team, including a slot for a player from AFC countries. A team can use four foreign players on the field in each game, including at least one player from the AFC country. Players from Hong Kong, Macau and Chinese Taipei are deemed to be native players in CSL.

- Players name in **bold** indicates the player was registered during the mid-season transfer window.
- Players in italics were out of the squad or left the club within the season, after the pre-season transfer window, or in the mid-season transfer window, and at least had one appearance.

Club	Player 1	Player 2	Player 3	Player 4	AFC player	Former players^{1}
Beijing Guoan	(Croatia) Darko Matić	(Ecuador) Joffre Guerrón	(Mali) Frédéric Kanouté	(Nigeria) **Peter Utaka**	(Uzbekistan) Egor Krimets	(Brazil) André Lima
Changchun Yatai	(Brazil) Éder Baiano	(Brazil) **Eninho**	(Brazil) Isac	(Czech Republic) **Jan Rezek**	(Uzbekistan) Anzur Ismailov	(Australia) Matt McKay (Brazil) Zé Carlos
Dalian Aerbin	(Brazil) Fábio Rochemback	(France) Guillaume Hoarau	(Mali) Seydou Keita	(Morocco) **Nabil Baha**	(Australia) **Daniel Mullen**	(Nigeria) Peter Utaka
Guangzhou Evergrande	(Argentina) Darío Conca	(Brazil) Elkeson	(Brazil) Muriqui		(South Korea) Kim Young-gwon	(Paraguay) Lucas Barrios
Guangzhou R&F	(Australia) **Eddy Bosnar**	(Brazil) Davi	(Brazil) Rafael Coelho	(Nigeria) Yakubu	(Australia) Rostyn Griffiths	(Brazil) Jumar
Guizhou Renhe	(Bosnia and Herzegovina) Zlatan Muslimović	(Bosnia and Herzegovina) Zvjezdan Misimović	(Spain) Nano Rivas	(Spain) Rafa Jordà	(Australia) Jonas Salley	
Hangzhou Greentown	(Brazil) Mazola	(Ivory Coast) Davy Claude Angan	(Japan) Masashi Oguro	(Slovenia) **Luka Žinko**	(South Korea) Kim Dong-jin	(Czech Republic) Marek Jarolím
Jiangsu Sainty	(Albania) Hamdi Salihi	(Brazil) Eleílson	(Romania) **Cristian Dănălache**	(Serbia) Aleksandar Jevtić	(Uzbekistan) Kamoliddin Tajiev	(Belarus) Sergey Krivets
Liaoning Whowin	(Argentina) Pablo Brandán	(Brazil) Edu	(Serbia) Miloš Trifunović	(Zambia) James Chamanga	(Uzbekistan) Shavkat Mullajanov	
Qingdao Jonoon	(Argentina) **Pablo Caballero**	(Brazil) Bruno Meneghel	(Brazil) Gustavo	(Nigeria) Gabriel Melkam	(Australia) **Joel Griffiths**	(Syria) George Mourad (Uzbekistan) Sherzod Karimov
Shandong Luneng	(Argentina) Leonardo Pisculichi	(Australia) Ryan McGowan	(Brazil) Gilberto Macena	(Brazil) **Vágner Love**	(Lebanon) Roda Antar	(Romania) Marius Niculae
Shanghai Dongya	(Australia) **Bernie Ibini-Isei**	(Colombia) Luis Carlos Cabezas	(Ghana) Ransford Addo	(Spain) Ibán Cuadrado	(Australia) **Daniel McBreen**	(Ghana) Chris Dickson
Shanghai Shenhua	(Argentina) Patricio Toranzo	(Argentina) Rolando Schiavi	(Cape Verde) Dady	(Colombia) Giovanni Moreno	(Syria) Firas Al-Khatib	
Shanghai Shenxin	(Brazil) Antônio Flávio	(Brazil) Jaílton Paraíba	(Brazil) Johnny	(Brazil) Kieza	(Australia) Michael Marrone	
Tianjin TEDA	(Brazil) **Andrezinho**	(Brazil) **Baré**	(Brazil) Éder Lima	(Colombia) Carmelo Valencia	(Australia) Erik Paartalu	(Bosnia and Herzegovina) Vladimir Jovančić (Brazil) Dinélson
Wuhan Zall	(Mali) Garra Dembélé	(Nigeria) Bentley	(Senegal) **Jacques Faty**	(Serbia) **Miloš Stojanović**	(South Korea) Cho Won-hee	(Brazil) Júnior Santos (Serbia) Novak Martinović

Hong Kong/Chinese Taipei/Macau players (doesn't count on the foreign player slot)

Club	Player 1
Beijing Guoan	(Hong Kong) **Lee Chi Ho**
Guizhou Renhe	(Chinese Taipei) **Xavier Chen**

- **^1** Foreign players who left their clubs after first half of the season.

== League table ==
Pos	Team	Pld	W	D	L	GF	GA	GD	Pts	Qualification or relegation
1	Guangzhou Evergrande (C)	30	24	5	1	78	18	+60	77	Qualification to Champions League group stage
2	Shandong Luneng	30	18	5	7	55	35	+20	59	Qualification to Champions League group stage
3	Beijing Guoan	30	14	9	7	54	31	+23	51	Qualification to Champions League qualifying round 3
4	Guizhou Renhe (Note: Guizhou Renhe qualified for the 2014 AFC Champions League Group Stage from winning the 2013 Chinese FA Cup.)	30	11	11	8	40	41	−1	44	Qualification to Champions League group stage
5	Dalian Aerbin	30	11	8	11	40	43	−3	41	
6	Guangzhou R&F	30	11	7	12	45	47	−2	40 (Note: Guangzhou R&F 2–0 Shanghai Shenxin, Shanghai Shenxin 1–0 Guangzhou R&F)	
7	Shanghai Shenxin	30	11	7	12	31	42	−11	40	
8	Shanghai Shenhua	30	11	11	8	36	36	0	38 (Note: Shanghai Shenhua and Tianjin TEDA were deducted 6 points each because of match-fixing scandal in 2003.)	
9	Shanghai Dongya	30	10	7	13	38	35	+3	37	
10	Liaoning Whowin	30	8	11	11	35	44	−9	35	
11	Tianjin TEDA	30	11	7	12	35	39	−4	34 (Note: Tianjin 2–2 Hangzhou, Hangzhou 0–1 Tianjin)	
12	Hangzhou Greentown	30	8	10	12	34	42	−8	34	
13	Jiangsu Sainty	30	7	11	12	32	39	−7	32 (Note: Jiangsu 2–1 Changchun, Changchun 0–0 Jiangsu)	
14	Changchun Yatai	30	8	8	14	29	41	−12	32	
15	Qingdao Jonoon (R)	30	7	10	13	26	41	−15	31	Relegation to League One
16	Wuhan Zall (R)	30	3	7	20	24	58	−34	16	Relegation to League One

Source: Chinese Super League (in Chinese)
Rules for classification: 1st points; 2nd head-to-head points; 3rd head-to-head goal difference; 4th head-to-head goals scored; 5th goal difference; 6th goals scored; 7th disciplinary points (1 point for each yellow card, 3 points for each red card). Head-to-Head: used when head-to-head record is used to rank tied teams.
(C) Champions; (R) Relegated

== Results ==
Home \ Away	GZ	JS	BJ	GZM	DLA	CC	GZF	TJ	SH	LN	HZ	SD	QD	SHE	WH	SSX
Guangzhou Evergrande		3–0	3–0	4–0	3–0	6–1	1–0	3–0	2–1	4–1	4–0	0–0	3–1	1–0	5–0	5–1
Jiangsu Sainty	1–2		0–1	0–2	0–1	2–1	2–0	2–3	2–2	1–0	2–1	1–1	3–0	0–0	2–1	2–2
Beijing Guoan	1–1	3–3		1–1	4–0	2–0	6–0	2–2	2–0	4–0	1–1	3–0	1–0	4–1	3–1	2–2
Guizhou Renhe	2–2	3–0	1–1		2–1	2–0	3–2	0–1	2–2	4–2	0–0	1–5	1–2	0–3	2–1	1–0
Dalian Aerbin	1–2	1–0	3–0	1–1		2–2	2–2	1–0	1–0	3–1	1–0	1–1	3–3	3–3	3–0	1–2
Changchun Yatai	1–2	0–0	2–0	0–1	2–0		2–2	3–1	1–0	1–0	2–2	2–3	0–1	0–0	1–1	1–3
Guangzhou R&F	0–2	0–0	2–1	3–5	3–2	1–0		2–1	4–2	2–4	4–1	0–2	2–0	0–0	5–1	2–0
Tianjin TEDA	1–0	1–1	1–0	0–1	2–0	1–0	1–1		1–1	3–1	2–2	2–1	1–2	2–3	3–2	1–0
Shanghai Shenhua	0–3	2–1	1–0	2–1	0–0	2–1	1–1	0–0		2–2	0–1	2–1	1–0	2–1	2–1	2–0
Liaoning Whowin	1–1	1–1	1–1	0–0	2–0	0–1	1–0	1–1	1–1		3–1	1–2	1–1	1–0	3–2	1–1
Hangzhou Greentown	0–1	1–1	2–1	3–0	3–4	1–1	3–1	0–1	0–0	1–0		3–3	2–1	2–1	1–1	1–1
Shandong Luneng	2–4	1–2	1–3	1–1	1–0	2–0	2–0	2–1	3–2	3–1	1–0		3–0	1–0	4–1	0–1
Qingdao Jonoon	1–3	1–0	1–1	0–0	1–0	1–1	1–1	4–1	1–1	0–1	0–1	1–2		1–0	0–0	0–0
Shanghai Dongya	1–1	2–1	0–3	1–1	2–2	2–0	0–3	1–0	0–1	1–2	2–0	0–1	6–1		1–0	0–1
Wuhan Zall	1–4	2–1	0–1	1–1	0–1	1–2	0–2	1–0	3–3	1–1	1–0	0–3	1–1	0–1		0–1
Shanghai Shenxin	0–3	1–1	1–2	2–1	1–2	0–1	1–0	2–1	0–1	1–1	2–1	2–3	1–0	1–6	1–0	

Updated to match(es) played on 3 Nov. 2013. Source: Results on the official website of the Chinese Super League (in Chinese)
Legend: Blue = home team win; Yellow = draw; Red = away team win.

== Positions by round ==
Team ╲ Round	1	2	3	4	5	6	7	8	9	10	11	12	13	14	15	16	17	18	19	20	21	22	23	24	25	26	27	28	29	30
Guangzhou Evergrande	1	1	3	2	1	1	1	1	1	1	1	1	1	1	1	1	1	1	1	1	1	1	1	1	1	1	1	1	1	1
Shandong Luneng	6	3	1	1	3	2	2	2	2	2	2	2	2	2	2	2	2	2	2	2	2	2	2	2	2	2	2	2	2	2
Beijing Guoan	2	2	4	3	4	4	4	3	5	4	6	5	5	4	4	4	3	3	3	3	3	3	3	3	4	3	3	3	3	3
Guizhou Renhe	9	8	7	10	6	7	5	5	3	3	3	3	3	3	3	3	4	4	4	4	4	4	4	4	3	4	4	4	4	4
Dalian Aerbin	11	12	10	8	9	8	7	7	8	8	10	7	10	12	10	8	9	9	7	7	6	7	8	7	8	9	10	8	6	5
Guangzhou R&F	12	13	14	13	14	11	12	13	13	13	12	13	11	8	8	9	7	8	6	5	5	5	5	6	7	6	5	5	7	6
Shanghai Shenxin	14	14	12	11	12	10	11	12	10	9	8	11	13	10	12	13	13	13	14	14	13	13	12	12	11	13	11	10	8	7
Shanghai Shenhua	15	15	15	14	11	12	9	10	12	11	9	9	12	13	13	12	11	11	12	12	11	8	7	8	6	8	6	7	5	8
Shanghai Dongya	13	10	9	7	8	6	8	9	9	12	13	12	9	11	9	11	8	7	9	10	7	9	10	9	9	7	9	6	9	9
Liaoning Whowin	3	5	5	5	5	5	6	6	4	5	5	6	6	5	5	5	5	5	5	6	8	6	6	5	5	5	7	9	10	10
Tianjin TEDA	15	16	16	16	16	16	16	16	16	16	16	16	15	16	15	15	14	14	13	13	14	14	14	13	12	10	8	11	11	11
Hangzhou Greentown	7	6	6	6	7	9	10	8	7	7	7	10	8	9	11	10	12	12	11	8	9	10	9	10	10	12	13	13	12	12
Jiangsu Sainty	4	7	8	9	10	13	13	11	11	10	11	8	7	6	7	7	10	10	10	11	12	10	11	11	13	11	12	12	13	13
Changchun Yatai	7	9	11	12	13	14	14	14	14	15	15	15	16	14	14	14	15	15	15	15	15	15	15	15	15	14	15	14	15	14
Qingdao Jonoon	4	4	2	4	2	3	3	4	6	6	4	4	4	7	6	6	6	6	8	9	10	12	13	14	14	15	14	15	14	15
Wuhan Zall	9	11	13	15	15	15	15	15	15	14	14	14	14	15	16	16	16	16	16	16	16	16	16	16	16	16	16	16	16	16

Leader and qualification to AFC Champions League group stage
Qualification to AFC Champions League group stage
Qualification to AFC Champions League qualifying round 3
Relegation to League One

Source: Table by round (in Chinese)

== Goalscorers ==
=== Top scorers ===
Rank	Player	Club	Total
1	(Brazil) Elkeson	Guangzhou Evergrande	26
2	(Colombia) Carmelo Valencia	Tianjin TEDA	16
3	(China) Wu Lei	Shanghai Dongya	15
3	(Nigeria) Yakubu	Guangzhou R&F	15
5	(Argentina) Darío Conca	Guangzhou Evergrande	14
5	(Brazil) Edu	Liaoning Whowin	14
5	(Nigeria) Peter Utaka	Dalian Aerbin/Beijing Guoan	14
8	(Brazil) Kieza	Shanghai Shenxin	11
8	(Brazil) Rafael Coelho	Guangzhou R&F	11
8	(China) Wang Yongpo	Shandong Luneng	11
8	(China) Zhang Xizhe	Beijing Guoan	11
8	(Ecuador) Joffre Guerrón	Beijing Guoan	11
8	(Syria) Firas Al-Khatib	Shanghai Shenhua	11

=== Hat-tricks ===
Player	For	Against	Result	Date
(Brazil) Elkeson	Guangzhou Evergrande	Jiangsu Sainty	3–0	16 March 2013
(Brazil) Elkeson	Guangzhou Evergrande	Changchun Yatai	6–1	20 April 2013
(China) Wu Lei	Shanghai Dongya	Shanghai Shenxin	6–1	2 June 2013
(Nigeria) Peter Utaka^{4}	Dalian Aerbin	Hangzhou Greentown	4–3	30 June 2013
(Brazil) Muriqui	Guangzhou Evergrande	Shanghai Shenxin	3–0	6 July 2013
(China) Wu Lei	Shanghai Dongya	Tianjin TEDA	3–2	17 August 2013
(China) Jiang Ning	Guangzhou R&F	Wuhan Zall	5–1	18 August 2013
(China) Zhang Xizhe	Beijing Guoan	Guangzhou R&F	6–0	14 September 2013
(Colombia) Carmelo Valencia	Tianjin TEDA	Jiangsu Sainty	3–2	14 September 2013
(Nigeria) Yakubu	Guangzhou R&F	Guizhou Renhe	3–5	22 September 2013
(China) Wu Lei	Shanghai Dongya	Qingdao Jonoon	6–1	27 September 2013

== Awards ==
- Chinese Football Association Footballer of the Year: (Argentina) Darío Conca (Guangzhou Evergrande)
- Chinese Super League Golden Boot Winner: (Brazil) Elkeson (Guangzhou Evergrande)
- Chinese Super League Domestic Golden Boot Award: (China) Wu Lei (Shanghai Dongya)
- Chinese Football Association Goalkeeper of the Year: (China) Zeng Cheng (Guangzhou Evergrande)
- Chinese Football Association Young Player of the Year: (China) Jin Jingdao (Shandong Luneng)
- Chinese Football Association Manager of the Year: (Italy) Marcello Lippi (Guangzhou Evergrande)
- Chinese Football Association Referee of the Year: (China) Li Jun (Jiangsu)
- Chinese Super League Fair Play Award: Shanghai Dongya, Guangzhou Evergrande, Beijing Guoan
- Chinese Super League Team of the Year (442):
  - GK (China) Zeng Cheng (Guangzhou Evergrande)
  - DF (China) Zhang Linpeng (Guangzhou Evergrande), (China) Xu Yunlong (Beijing Guoan), (South Korea) Kim Young-gwon (Guangzhou Evergrande), (China) Zheng Zheng (Shandong Luneng)
  - MF (China) Zheng Zhi (Guangzhou Evergrande), (China) Zhang Xizhe (Beijing Guoan), (China) Wang Yongpo (Shandong Luneng), (Argentina) Darío Conca (Guangzhou Evergrande)
  - FW (Brazil) Elkeson (Guangzhou Evergrande), (Brazil) Muriqui (Guangzhou Evergrande)

== League attendance ==
Pos	Team	Total	High	Low	Average	Change
1	Guangzhou Evergrande	606,413	56,300	32,467	40,428	+8.5%
2	Beijing Guoan	589,028	46,310	31,500	39,269	+6.5%
3	Jiangsu Sainty	432,122	58,792	22,357	28,808	−7.6%
4	Shandong Luneng	415,246	46,179	16,456	27,683	+37.4%
5	Guizhou Renhe	319,678	45,671	11,325	21,312	−27.9%
6	Liaoning Whowin	312,744	24,580	14,561	20,850	+11.9%
7	Tianjin TEDA	248,648	47,666	6,886	16,577	+16.9%
8	Wuhan Zall	216,046	41,138	2,853	14,403	+114.9%^{†}
9	Hangzhou Greentown	212,458	32,075	7,582	14,164	+34.1%
10	Changchun Yatai	194,624	26,852	7,861	12,975	+2.2%
11	Shanghai Shenhua	191,085	23,457	8,653	12,739	−13.7%
12	Dalian Aerbin	158,064	21,811	2,760	10,538	−33.2%
13	Guangzhou R&F	155,762	14,535	7,223	10,384	+22.7%
14	Shanghai Dongya	152,413	23,887	6,993	10,161	+226.4%^{†}
15	Shanghai Shenxin	128,391	11,975	6,870	8,559	−26.2%
16	Qingdao Jonoon	124,255	16,325	3,252	8,284	−13.1%
	League total	4,456,977	58,792	2,760	18,571	−0.9%

Updated to games played on 3 Nov. 2013
Source: CSL data (in Chinese)
Notes:
^{†} Teams played previous season in CL1.

=== Top 10 attendances ===
Attendance	Round	Date	Home	Score	Away	Venue	Weekday	Time of Day
58,792	17	14 July 2013	Jiangsu Sainty	1–2	Guangzhou Evergrande	Nanjing Olympic Sports Centre	Sunday	Night
56,300	22	25 August 2013	Guangzhou Evergrande	1–0	Guangzhou R&F	Tianhe Stadium	Sunday	Night
48,013	12	1 June 2013	Guangzhou Evergrande	0–0	Shandong Luneng	Tianhe Stadium	Saturday	Night
47,666	25	21 September 2013	Tianjin TEDA	1–0	Beijing Guoan	Tianjin Olympic Center Stadium	Saturday	Night
46,310	3	29 March 2013	Beijing Guoan	1–1	Guangzhou Evergrande	Workers' Stadium	Friday	Night
46,208	26	28 September 2013	Beijing Guoan	2–0	Shanghai Shenhua	Workers' Stadium	Saturday	Night
46,179	27	6 Oct. 2013	Shandong Luneng	2–4	Guangzhou Evergrande	Jinan Olympic Sports Center Stadium	Sunday	Afternoon
45,671	19	3 August 2013	Guizhou Renhe	2–2	Guangzhou Evergrande	Guiyang Olympic Sports Center	Saturday	Night
43,539	19	4 August 2013	Beijing Guoan	3–3	Jiangsu Sainty	Workers' Stadium	Sunday	Night
43,121	17	14 July 2013	Beijing Guoan	3–1	Wuhan Zall	Workers' Stadium	Sunday	Night
