= 2014 Chinese Super League =

Chinese Super League
- Season: 2014
- Champions: Guangzhou Evergrande; 4th title
- Relegated: Dalian Aerbin; Harbin Yiteng
- Champions League: Guangzhou Evergrande; Beijing Guoan; Guangzhou R&F
- Matches: 240
- Goals: 659 (2.75 per match)
- Top goalscorer: Elkeson (28 goals)
- Biggest home win: Guangzhou Evergrande 6–0 Liaoning Whowin (31 Aug. 2014) (6 goals)
- Biggest away win: Liaoning Whowin 0–4 Guangzhou Evergrande (26 Apr. 2014); Liaoning Whowin 1–5 Guangzhou R&F (31 Jul. 2014) (4 goals)
- Highest scoring: Harbin Yiteng 3–6 Guangzhou Evergrande (30 Jul. 2014) (9 goals)
- Longest winning run: Guangzhou Evergrande (9 matches)
- Longest unbeaten run: Guangzhou Evergrande (9 matches)
- Longest winless run: Harbin Yiteng; Liaoning Whowin (9 matches)
- Longest losing run: Harbin Yiteng (8 matches)
- Highest attendance: 52,301; Beijing Guoan 1–1 Guangzhou Evergrande (26 May 2014)
- Lowest attendance: 2,053; Liaoning Whowin 2–1 Hangzhou Greentown (4 May 2014)
- Average attendance: 18,986

The 2014 Chinese Super League was the eleventh season since the establishment of the Chinese Super League, the 21st season of a professional Association football league and the 53rd top-tier league season in China. Guangzhou Evergrande won their fourth consecutive title of the league.

== Promotion and relegation ==
Teams promoted from 2013 China League One

- Henan Jianye
- Harbin Yiteng

Teams relegated to 2014 China League One

- Qingdao Jonoon
- Wuhan Zall

== Clubs ==
=== Clubs and locations ===
Club	Head coach	City	Stadium	Capacity	2013 season
Guangzhou Evergrande ^{TH}	(Italy) Marcello Lippi	Guangzhou	Tianhe Stadium	58,500	1st
Shandong Luneng Taishan	(Brazil) Cuca	Jinan	Jinan Olympic Sports Luneng Stadium	56,808	2nd
Beijing Guoan	(Spain) Gregorio Manzano	Beijing	Workers' Stadium	66,161	3rd
Guizhou Renhe	(China) Zhu Jiong	Guiyang	Guiyang Olympic Sports Center	51,636	4th
Dalian Aerbin	(Japan) Yasuharu Kurata	Dalian	Dalian Sports Center	61,000	5th
Guangzhou R&F	(Sweden) Sven-Göran Eriksson	Guangzhou	Yuexiushan Stadium	18,000	6th
Shanghai Shenxin	(China) Guo Guangqi	Shanghai	Jinshan Football Stadium	30,000	7th
Shanghai Greenland Shenhua	(Argentina) Sergio Batista	Shanghai	Hongkou Football Stadium	33,060	8th
Shanghai Dongya	(China) Xi Zhikang	Shanghai	Shanghai Stadium	56,842	9th
Liaoning Whowin	(China) Chen Yang	Shenyang (playing in Panjin)	Panjin Stadium	35,600	10th
Tianjin TEDA	(Netherlands) Arie Haan	Tianjin	Tianjin Olympic Center Stadium	54,696	11th
Hangzhou Greentown	(China) Yang Ji (caretaker)	Hangzhou	Yellow Dragon Sports Center	52,672	12th
Jiangsu Sainty	(China) Gao Hongbo	Nanjing	Nanjing Olympic Sports Centre	61,443	13th
Changchun Yatai	(Serbia) Dragan Okuka	Changchun	Development Area Stadium	25,000	14th
Henan Jianye ^{P}	(China) Jia Xiuquan	Zhengzhou	Zhengzhou Hanghai Stadium	29,860	CL1, 1st
Harbin Yiteng ^{P}	(Croatia) Marijo Tot	Harbin	Harbin ICE Sports Center	50,000	CL1, 2nd

Location of teams in 2014 Chinese Super League

=== Managerial changes ===
Team	Outgoing manager	Manner of departure	Date of vacancy	Table	Incoming manager	Date of appointment
Jiangsu Sainty	(Serbia) Dragan Okuka	Expiration of contract	5 November 2013	N/A	(China) Gao Hongbo	8 November 2013
Hangzhou Greentown	(Japan) Takeshi Okada	Resigned	5 November 2013	N/A	(China) Yang Ji (caretaker)	8 November 2013
Shanghai Dongya	(China) Gao Hongbo	Expiration of contract	8 November 2013	N/A	(China) Xi Zhikang	4 December 2013
Liaoning Whowin	(China) Ma Lin	Expiration of contract	27 November 2013	N/A	(China) Gao Sheng	27 November 2013
Shanghai Shenxin	(China) Guo Guangqi (caretaker)	–	2 December 2013	N/A	(China) Cheng Yaodong	2 December 2013
Dalian Aerbin	(Bosnia and Herzegovina) Simo Krunić	Sacked	9 December 2013	N/A	(China) Ma Lin	9 December 2013
Shandong Luneng Taishan	(Serbia) Radomir Antić	Sacked	21 December 2013	N/A	(Brazil) Cuca	22 December 2013
Tianjin TEDA	(Costa Rica) Alexandre Guimarães	Expiration of contract	31 December 2013	N/A	(Netherlands) Arie Haan	12 January 2014
Beijing Guoan	(Serbia) Aleksandar Stanojević	Sacked	10 January 2014	N/A	(Spain) Gregorio Manzano	11 February 2014
Shanghai Greenland Shenhua	(China) Shen Xiangfu	–	29 March 2014	11th	(Argentina) Sergio Batista	29 March 2014
Liaoning Whowin	(China) Gao Sheng	Resigned	9 April 2014	10th	(China) Chen Yang	9 April 2014
Changchun Yatai	(Serbia) Svetozar Šapurić	Resigned	21 April 2014	15th	(China) Gao Jinggang (caretaker)	21 April 2014
Guizhou Renhe	(China) Gong Lei	–	23 April 2014	7th	(China) Zhu Jiong	23 April 2014
Changchun Yatai	(China) Gao Jinggang (caretaker)	–	28 April 2014	12th	(Serbia) Dragan Okuka	28 April 2014
Dalian Aerbin	(China) Ma Lin	Resigned	28 May 2014	13th	(Japan) Yasuharu Kurata	30 May 2014
Henan Jianye	(China) Tang Yaodong	Resigned	28 May 2014	15th	(China) Jia Xiuquan	3 June 2014
Harbin Yiteng	(China) Duan Xin	–	19 July 2014	16th	(Croatia) Marijo Tot	19 July 2014
Shanghai Shenxin	(China) Cheng Yaodong	Resigned	29 September 2014	14th	(China) Guo Guangqi	29 September 2014

=== Foreign players ===
The number of foreign players is restricted to five per CSL team, including a slot for a player from AFC countries. A team can use four foreign players on the field in each game, including at least one player from the AFC country. Players from Hong Kong, Macau and Chinese Taipei are deemed to be native players in CSL.

- Players named in **bold** indicates players that were registered during the mid-season transfer window.
- Players named in italics indicates players that were out of squad or left the club during the mid-season transfer window, and at least have one appearance.

Club	Player 1	Player 2	Player 3	Player 4	AFC player	Former players^{1}
Beijing Guoan	(Argentina) Pablo Batalla	(Croatia) Darko Matić	(Montenegro) **Dejan Damjanović**	(Sweden) **Erton Fejzullahu**	(South Korea) Ha Dae-sung	(Ecuador) Joffre Guerrón (Nigeria) Peter Utaka
Changchun Yatai	(Argentina) Matías Iglesias	(Brazil) Eninho	(Hungary) **Szabolcs Huszti**	(Montenegro) Fatos Bećiraj	(Uzbekistan) Anzur Ismailov	(Brazil) Rafael Coelho
Dalian Aerbin	(Argentina) **Esteban Solari**	(Brazil) Bruno Meneghel	(Sweden) Niklas Backman			(Croatia) Leon Benko (Iraq) Nashat Akram
Guangzhou Evergrande	(Brazil) Elkeson	(Brazil) Renê Júnior	(Italy) **Alberto Gilardino**	(Italy) Alessandro Diamanti	(South Korea) Kim Young-gwon	(Brazil) Muriqui
Guangzhou R&F	(Brazil) Davi	(Morocco) Abderrazak Hamdallah	(Nigeria) **Aaron Samuel Olanare**	(South Korea) Jang Hyun-soo	(South Korea) Park Jong-woo	(Denmark) Ken Ilsø
Guizhou Renhe	(Bosnia and Herzegovina) Zvjezdan Misimović	(Brazil) Hyuri	(Germany) **Mike Hanke**	(Poland) Krzysztof Maczynski	(Australia) Jonas Salley	(Bosnia and Herzegovina) Zlatan Muslimović
Hangzhou Greentown	(Brazil) Anselmo Ramon	(Brazil) Gilberto Macena	(Ivory Coast) Davy Claude Angan	(Slovenia) Luka Žinko	(South Korea) Son Dae-ho	
Harbin Yiteng	(Australia) Adam Hughes	(Brazil) Dori	(Brazil) Rodrigo Paulista	(Colombia) Ricardo Steer	(South Korea) **Choi Hyun-yeon**	(South Korea) Noh Hyung-goo
Henan Jianye	(Angola) Nando Rafael	(Brazil) Rafael Marques	(Jamaica) Ryan Johnson	(Sierra Leone) Gibril Sankoh	(South Korea) Lee Ji-nam	
Jiangsu Sainty	(Brazil) Eleílson	(Brazil) Elias	(Colombia) **Edison Toloza**	(Lebanon) Roda Antar	(South Korea) Yoon Sin-young	(Montenegro) Dejan Damjanović
Liaoning Whowin	(Nigeria) **Derick Ogbu**	(Serbia) Aleksandar Jevtić	(Zambia) James Chamanga		(Australia) **Josh Mitchell**	(Australia) Billy Celeski (Belgium) Kevin Oris (Uzbekistan) Artyom Filiposyan
Shandong Luneng Taishan	(Argentina) Walter Montillo	(Brazil) Aloísio	(Brazil) Junior Urso	(Brazil) Vágner Love	(Australia) Ryan McGowan	
Shanghai Dongya	(Ghana) Ransford Addo	(Spain) Ibán Cuadrado	(Sweden) **Imad Khalili**	(Sweden) Tobias Hysén	(Australia) Daniel McBreen	
Shanghai Greenland Shenhua	(Argentina) **Lucas Viatri**	(Brazil) Paulo André	(Brazil) **Paulo Henrique**	(Colombia) Giovanni Moreno	(South Korea) Cho Byung-kuk	(Colombia) Luis Ruiz (Syria) Firas Al-Khatib
Shanghai Shenxin	(Brazil) **Everton**	(Brazil) Jaílton Paraíba	(Brazil) Johnny	(Nigeria) **Peter Utaka**	(South Korea) Lim You-hwan	(Brazil) Kieza (Montenegro) Radomir Đalović
Tianjin TEDA	(Brazil) Andrezinho	(Brazil) Baré	(Brazil) Éder Lima	(Colombia) Carmelo Valencia	(Lebanon) Mak Lind	

- **^1** Foreign players who left their clubs after first half of the season.

Hong Kong/Macau/Taiwan players (doesn't count on the foreign player slot)

Club	Player 1	Player 2
Guizhou Renhe Moutai	(Chinese Taipei) Xavier Chen	
Harbin Yiteng	(Hong Kong) Wisdom Fofo Agbo	
Shanghai Greenland Shenhua	(Chinese Taipei) Chen Po-liang	(Hong Kong) Brian Fok

== League table ==
Pos	Team	Pld	W	D	L	GF	GA	GD	Pts	Qualification or relegation
1	Guangzhou Evergrande (C)	30	22	4	4	76	28	+48	70	Qualification to Champions League group stage
2	Beijing Guoan	30	21	4	5	50	25	+25	67	Qualification to Champions League play-off round
3	Guangzhou R&F	30	17	6	7	67	39	+28	57	Qualification to Champions League preliminary round 2
4	Shandong Luneng Taishan (Note: Shandong Luneng Taishan qualified for the 2015 AFC Champions League Group Stage from winning the 2014 Chinese FA Cup.)	30	12	12	6	41	29	+12	48 (Note: Shandong 3–3 Shanghai SIPG; Shanghai SIPG 0–0 Shandong)	Qualification to Champions League group stage
5	Shanghai Dongya	30	12	12	6	47	39	+8	48	
6	Guizhou Renhe	30	11	8	11	33	35	−2	41	
7	Tianjin TEDA	30	10	9	11	41	44	−3	39	
8	Jiangsu Sainty	30	9	10	11	37	45	−8	37	
9	Shanghai Greenland Shenhua	30	8	11	11	33	45	−12	35	
10	Liaoning Whowin	30	8	9	13	33	48	−15	33 (Note: Shanghai S. 0–0 Liaoning; Liaoning 3–0 Shanghai S.)	
11	Shanghai Shenxin	30	9	6	15	26	42	−16	33	
12	Hangzhou Greentown	30	8	8	14	43	60	−17	32 (Note: Changchun 2–3 Hangzhou; Hangzhou 1–1 Changchun)	
13	Changchun Yatai	30	8	8	14	33	40	−7	32	
14	Henan Jianye	30	6	12	12	32	39	−7	30	
15	Dalian Aerbin (R)	30	6	11	13	32	45	−13	29	Relegation to League One
16	Harbin Yiteng (R)	30	5	6	19	35	56	−21	21	Relegation to League One

Source: Chinese Super League (in Chinese)
Rules for classification: 1st points; 2nd head-to-head points; 3rd head-to-head goal difference; 4th head-to-head goals scored; 5th reserve league points; 6th goal difference; 7th goals scored; 8th disciplinary points (1 point for each yellow card, 3 points for each red card).
(C) Champions; (R) Relegated

=== Results ===
Home \ Away	GZ	SD	BJ	GZM	DL	GZF	SHS	SGS	SHE	LN	TJ	HZ	JS	CC	HN	HEB
Guangzhou Evergrande		0–0	0–1	1–1	4–2	0–1	2–1	2–1	5–0	6–0	2–1	4–0	3–0	1–3	3–0	4–1
Shandong Luneng Taishan	1–1		2–2	0–0	1–2	3–3	4–0	2–0	3–3	1–0	2–2	2–0	2–2	1–0	2–1	1–0
Beijing Guoan	1–1	0–3		2–1	4–1	2–0	2–1	2–0	2–0	1–0	2–1	4–0	1–0	1–0	0–0	2–0
Guizhou Renhe	1–2	0–0	1–2		0–2	2–1	0–1	3–0	1–1	1–0	2–0	2–1	1–1	0–1	3–1	3–2
Dalian Aerbin	1–2	1–3	0–1	1–1		0–0	2–1	0–1	1–1	1–2	2–3	1–1	2–2	2–1	1–1	3–1
Guangzhou R&F	3–4	1–3	3–1	1–0	3–0		0–1	4–0	2–2	0–0	2–3	6–2	3–2	3–1	4–0	5–1
Shanghai Shenxin	0–1	0–1	2–1	0–1	1–1	1–3		0–2	1–3	0–0	0–1	1–1	1–1	0–2	2–1	1–0
Shanghai Greenland Shenhua	1–2	1–0	0–3	1–0	2–0	0–0	2–0		1–1	3–2	2–5	1–3	1–1	2–3	0–0	2–1
Shanghai Dongya	0–3	0–0	1–0	5–2	2–0	1–2	5–1	1–1		3–3	1–1	2–1	3–0	1–0	1–0	1–0
Liaoning Whowin	0–4	0–0	1–3	1–2	0–0	1–5	3–0	1–1	1–1		0–2	2–1	0–2	3–1	1–0	3–0
Tianjin TEDA	2–5	1–1	0–1	1–2	2–1	1–1	0–0	1–0	3–3	1–2		1–2	1–2	2–1	1–1	3–0
Hangzhou Greentown	1–4	4–1	1–2	2–1	1–1	1–3	2–2	0–0	1–2	3–4	2–0		3–1	1–1	1–1	2–1
Jiangsu Sainty	0–2	1–0	2–3	0–0	1–0	1–3	0–3	1–1	1–0	1–1	4–0	2–2		0–2	3–4	2–1
Changchun Yatai	2–1	1–0	2–2	0–0	1–1	2–3	0–2	2–2	1–2	2–0	1–1	2–3	0–1		0–0	0–2
Henan Jianye	0–1	1–2	2–1	1–2	2–2	4–0	1–2	2–2	1–0	1–0	0–1	3–0	1–1	0–0		1–1
Harbin Yiteng	3–6	2–0	0–1	4–0	0–1	0–2	0–1	3–3	1–1	2–2	0–0	3–1	1–2	3–1	2–2	

Updated to match(es) played on 2 Nov. 2014. Source: Results on the official website of the Chinese Super League (in Chinese)
Legend: Blue = home team win; Yellow = draw; Red = away team win.

=== Positions by round ===
Team ╲ Round	1	2	3	4	5	6	7	8	9	10	11	12	13	14	15	16	17	18	19	20	21	22	23	24	25	26	27	28	29	30
Guangzhou Evergrande	1	1	4	2	1	1	1	1	1	1	1	1	1	1	1	1	1	1	1	1	1	1	1	1	1	1	1	1	1	1
Beijing Guoan	3	2	1	3	2	2	3	3	2	2	2	2	2	2	2	2	2	2	2	2	2	2	2	2	2	2	2	2	2	2
Guangzhou R&F	5	8	5	4	6	5	4	4	4	3	3	3	4	3	3	3	3	3	3	3	3	3	3	3	3	3	3	3	3	3
Shandong Luneng Taishan	3	6	8	6	5	4	2	2	3	4	4	4	3	4	4	4	5	5	6	6	6	6	6	5	4	4	4	4	4	4
Shanghai Dongya	5	3	2	1	3	3	5	5	5	5	5	5	5	6	5	5	4	4	4	4	4	4	4	4	5	5	5	5	5	5
Guizhou Renhe	11	5	3	5	7	8	7	7	8	6	7	7	7	8	8	9	8	6	5	5	5	5	5	6	6	6	6	7	7	6
Tianjin TEDA	5	13	13	7	14	15	10	10	11	14	11	9	8	7	7	6	7	7	7	8	8	8	8	8	8	8	9	8	6	7
Jiangsu Sainty	11	10	8	10	4	6	6	6	7	8	6	6	6	5	6	7	6	8	8	7	7	7	7	7	7	7	7	6	8	8
Shanghai Greenland Shenhua	2	7	10	11	13	7	9	9	9	9	9	10	11	12	13	8	9	9	9	10	9	9	10	11	9	11	8	9	9	9
Liaoning Whowin	5	8	12	15	10	10	12	13	13	10	12	11	13	14	14	14	15	15	15	15	15	15	15	14	12	13	14	12	10	10
Shanghai Shenxin	15	16	16	14	15	12	11	11	12	15	14	13	9	9	10	13	13	13	13	13	12	10	12	12	13	14	15	13	11	11
Hangzhou Greentown	5	4	6	12	8	9	8	8	6	7	8	8	10	10	9	10	10	10	11	11	11	12	11	9	10	10	11	11	13	12
Changchun Yatai	13	12	7	9	11	13	15	12	10	13	15	15	14	11	12	12	12	11	10	9	10	11	9	10	11	9	10	10	12	13
Henan Jianye	16	14	14	13	9	11	14	15	15	12	13	14	15	15	15	15	14	14	14	14	13	13	14	15	15	15	13	15	14	14
Dalian Aerbin	5	11	11	8	12	14	13	14	14	11	10	12	12	13	11	11	11	12	12	12	14	14	13	13	14	12	12	14	15	15
Harbin Yiteng	13	15	15	16	16	16	16	16	16	16	16	16	16	16	16	16	16	16	16	16	16	16	16	16	16	16	16	16	16	16

Leader and qualification to AFC Champions League group stage
Qualification to AFC Champions League play-off round
Qualification to AFC Champions League preliminary round 2
Relegation to League One

Source: Table by round (in Chinese)

== Goalscorers ==
=== Top scorers ===
Rank	Player	Club	Total
1	(Brazil) Elkeson	Guangzhou Evergrande	28
2	(Morocco) Abderrazak Hamdallah	Guangzhou R&F	22
3	(Sweden) Tobias Hysen	Shanghai Dongya	19
4	(Brazil) Anselmo Ramon	Hangzhou Greentown	16
5	(Montenegro) Dejan Damjanović	Jiangsu Sainty/Beijing Guoan	15
6	(Brazil) Davi	Guangzhou R&F	14
7	(Brazil) Vágner Love	Shandong Luneng Taishan	13
8	(Brazil) Bruno Meneghel	Dalian Aerbin	12
8	(China) Wu Lei	Shanghai Dongya	12
10	(Brazil) Dori	Harbin Yiteng	11
10	(Zambia) James Chamanga	Liaoning Whowin	11

Source: sports.sohu.com

=== Hat-tricks ===
Player	For	Against	Result	Date
(Morocco) Abderrazak Hamdallah	Guangzhou R&F	Shanghai Shenxin	3–1	22 March 2014
(Morocco) Abderrazak Hamdallah	Guangzhou R&F	Hangzhou Greentown	6–2	30 March 2014
(China) Du Zhenyu	Tianjin TEDA	Harbin Yiteng	3–0	30 March 2014
(Zambia) James Chamanga	Liaoning Whowin	Harbin Yiteng	3–0	5 April 2014
(Brazil) Vágner Love	Shandong Luneng Taishan	Beijing Guoan	3–0	19 April 2014
(Sweden) Tobias Hysen	Shanghai Dongya	Guizhou Renhe	5–2	11 May 2014
(Brazil) Dori	Harbin Yiteng	Shanghai Greenland Shenhua	3–3	17 May 2014
(Brazil) Elkeson	Guangzhou Evergrande	Hangzhou Greentown	4–1	18 May 2014
(Brazil) Elkeson	Guangzhou Evergrande	Liaoning Whowin	6–0	31 August 2014
(Montenegro) Dejan Damjanović	Beijing Guoan	Liaoning Whowin	3–1	28 September 2014
(Brazil) Andrezinho	Tianjin TEDA	Shanghai Greenland Shenhua	5–2	26 October 2014

== Awards ==
Award	Winner	Club
Chinese Football Association Footballer of the Year	(Brazil) Elkeson	Guangzhou Evergrande
Chinese Super League Golden Boot Winner	(Brazil) Elkeson	Guangzhou Evergrande
Chinese Super League Domestic Golden Boot Award	(China) Wu Lei	Shanghai Dongya
Chinese Football Association Goalkeeper of the Year	(China) Wang Dalei	Shandong Luneng Taishan
Chinese Football Association Young Player of the Year	(China) Liu Binbin	Shandong Luneng Taishan
Chinese Football Association Manager of the Year	(Spain) Gregorio Manzano	Beijing Guoan
Chinese Football Association Referee of the Year	(China) Tan Hai	
Chinese Super League Fair Play Award	Henan Jianye, Hangzhou Greentown	

Chinese Super League Team of the Year
Goalkeeper	(China) Wang Dalei (Shandong Luneng Taishan)			
Defenders	(China) Xu Yunlong (Beijing Guoan)	(South Korea) Kim Young-gwon (Guangzhou Evergrande)	(China) Zhang Linpeng (Guangzhou Evergrande)	(China) Zheng Zheng (Shandong Luneng Taishan)
Midfielders	(China) Zhang Xizhe (Beijing Guoan)	(Colombia) Giovanni Moreno (Shanghai Greenland Shenhua)	(China) Zheng Zhi (Guangzhou Evergrande)	(Brazil) Davi (Guangzhou R&F)
Forwards	(Brazil) Elkeson (Guangzhou Evergrande)		(China) Wu Lei (Shanghai Dongya)	

== League attendance ==
Pos	Team	Total	High	Low	Average	Change
1	Guangzhou Evergrande	632,314	48,765	36,351	42,154	+4.3%
2	Beijing Guoan	590,922	52,301	32,012	39,395	+0.3%
3	Harbin Yiteng	391,897	40,678	18,317	26,126	+299.5%^{†}
4	Jiangsu Sainty	365,229	52,117	10,079	24,349	−15.5%
5	Shandong Luneng Taishan	358,968	42,936	16,763	23,931	−13.6%
6	Henan Jianye	275,854	21,528	13,526	18,390	−3.6%^{†}
7	Tianjin TEDA	257,852	49,986	9,036	17,190	+3.7%
8	Shanghai Greenland Shrnhua	231,262	24,856	10,753	15,417	+21.0%
9	Hangzhou Greentown	206,492	30,756	3,482	13,766	−2.8%
10	Changchun Yatai	193,293	26,187	7,526	12,886	−0.7%
11	Liaoning Whowin	191,718	33,785	2,053	12,781	−38.7%
12	Shanghai Dongya	186,894	23,286	9,635	12,460	+22.6%
13	Guizhou Renhe	184,906	25,491	5,611	12,327	−42.2%
14	Guangzhou R&F	172,309	18,873	6,435	11,487	+10.6%
15	Dalian Aerbin	164,890	22,118	6,222	10,993	+4.3%
16	Shanghai Shenxin	151,720	15,669	5,812	10,115	+18.2%
	League total	4,556,520	52,301	2,053	18,986	+2.2%

Updated to games played on 2 Nov. 2014
Source: CSL official data (in Chinese)
Notes:
^{†} Teams played previous season in CL1.
