= 2012 Shanghai Shenxin F.C. season =

Shanghai Shenxin F.C.
2012 season
- Chairman: Xu Guoliang
- Manager: Zhu Jiong
- Super League: 9th
- FA Cup: Third round
Home colours	Away colours

The 2012 Shanghai Shenxin F.C. season was Shenxin's 3rd consecutive season in the Chinese Super League. Shenxin also competed in the Chinese FA Cup.

== Competitions ==
=== Chinese Super League ===
==== League table ====
Pos	Team	Pld	W	D	L	GF	GA	GD	Pts
7	Guangzhou R&F	30	13	3	14	47	49	−2	42
8	Tianjin TEDA	30	10	10	10	29	30	−1	40
9	Shanghai Shenhua	30	8	14	8	39	34	+5	38
10	Liaoning Whowin	30	8	12	10	40	41	−1	36 (Note: Liaoning, 10pts; Hangzhou, 9pts; Shandong, 6pts, GF=4, GA=5; Qingdao, 6pts, GF=4, GA=5)
11	Hangzhou Greentown	30	9	9	12	34	46	−12	36

Source: Chinese Super League (in Chinese)
Rules for classification: 1) points; 2) goal difference; 3) number of goals scored; 4) head-to-head goals scored; 5) goal difference; 6) goals scored; 7) disciplinary points (1 point for each yellow card, 3 points for each red card). Head-to-Head: Only used at the end of the season when two or more teams need the head-to-head rules to break a tie.

==== Matches ====
11 March 2012 Round 1	Guangzhou Evergrande	2–1	Shanghai Shenxin	Guangzhou
19:35 UTC+8	Conca 31', 44'	Report	Flávio 18'	Stadium: Tianhe Stadium; Attendance: 36,187; Referee: Li Haihe; Assistant referees: Li Dongnan; Liu Guiqing; Fourth official: Wang Jin

17 March 2012 Round 2	Henan Jianye	0–4	Shanghai Shenxin	Zhengzhou
15:30 UTC+8		Report	Johnny (yellow card) 33'; Jaílton Paraíba 60', 76'; Antônio Flávio 69'; Salley 83'; Zhao Zuojun (yellow card) 85'	Stadium: Zhengzhou Hanghai Stadium; Attendance: 20,358; Referee: (China) Shi Zhenlu

24 March 2012 Round 3	Shanghai Shenxin	0–0	Guizhou Renhe	Shanghai
14:00 UTC+8	Antônio Flávio (yellow card) 30'; Ye Chongqiu (yellow card) 65'; Wang Yun (yellow card) 72'	Report	Li Chunyu (yellow card) 27'; Yu Hai (yellow card) 39'; Nano (yellow card) 46'; Djulbic (yellow card) 90'	Stadium: Jinshan Sports Centre; Attendance: 5,084; Referee: (China) Xu Hang

1 April 2012 Round 4	Changchun Yatai	1–0	Shanghai Shenxin	Changchun
16:30 UTC+8	Zhang Wenzhao (yellow card) 56'; Ismailov (yellow card) 68'; Mosquera 82'	Report	Salley (yellow card) 36'; Xu Wen (yellow card) 40'	Stadium: Development Area Stadium; Attendance: 10,552; Referee: (China) Zhou Gang

7 April 2012 Round 5	Shanghai Shenxin	3–1	Dalian Aerbin	Shanghai
17:00 UTC+8	Wang Yun 13'; Anselmo 19' (pen.); Xu Wen (yellow card) 27'; Liu Dianzuo (yellow card) 62'; Zhao Zuojun (yellow card) 67'; Ye Chongqiu 76'; Jaílton Paraíba (yellow card) 82'	Report	Canales 64'	Stadium: Jinshan Sports Centre; Attendance: 3,950; Referee: (China) Mo Weicong

15 April 2012 Round 6	Qingdao Jonoon	2–1	Shanghai Shenxin	Qingdao
20:35 UTC+8	Liu Jian 58' (pen.), 81'; Melkam (yellow card) 77'; Zheng Long (red card) 86'	Report	Anselmo 5'; Zhu Baojie (yellow card) 15'; Liu Dianzuo (yellow card) 55'; Ye Chongqiu (yellow card) 70'; Salley (yellow card) 80'; Antônio Flávio (red card) 86'	Stadium: Qingdao Tiantai Stadium; Attendance: 6,122; Referee: (China) Ai Kun

22 April 2012 Round 7	Shanghai Shenxin	0–1	Jiangsu Sainty	Shanghai
16:40 UTC+8	Anselmo (yellow card) 20'; Pan Chaoran (yellow card) 89'	Report	Dănălache 81'	Stadium: Jinshan Sports Centre; Attendance: 7,644; Referee: (China) Huang Yejun

27 April 2012 Round 8	Beijing Guoan	1–0	Shanghai Shenxin	Beijing
20:30 UTC+8	Xu Yunlong 51'	Report	Zhao Zuojun (yellow card) 10'; Anselmo (yellow card) 51'; Salley (yellow card) 89'	Stadium: Workers Stadium; Attendance: 36,858; Referee: (China) Ma Ning

5 May 2012 Round 9	Shanghai Shenxin	4–2	Guangzhou R&F	Shanghai
21:00 UTC+8	Salley 13'; Anselmo 53', 81'; Wang Yun 72'	Report	Griffiths (yellow card) 29'; Davi 41' (pen.); Wu Weian (yellow card) 55'; Tang Miao (yellow card) 70'; Rafael Coelho 90+1'	Stadium: Jinshan Sports Centre; Attendance: 10,051; Referee: (China) Zhao Zhizhi

12 May 2012 Round 10	Shanghai Shenhua	0–0	Shanghai Shenxin	Shanghai
20:45 UTC+8	Dai Lin (yellow card) 3'	Report	Li Lei (yellow card) 53' (yellow-red card) 72'	Stadium: Hongkou Football Stadium; Attendance: 11,732; Referee: (Japan) Yoshiro Imamura

18 May 2012 Round 11	Shanghai Shenxin	0–1	Hangzhou Greentown	Shanghai
20:45 UTC+8	Wang Yun (yellow card) 48'; Zhu Baojie (yellow card) 61'; Zhao Zuojun (yellow card) 90'	Report	Mazola (yellow card) 59' (yellow-red card) 90'; Bari Mamatil (yellow card) 71'; Du Wei 90+2'	Stadium: Jinshan Sports Centre; Attendance: 12,359; Referee: (China) Zhong Jun

25 May 2012 Round 12	Tianjin Teda	0–0	Shanghai Shenxin	Tianjin
20:30 UTC+8	Liao Bochao (yellow card) 17'; Susak (yellow card) 34'; Cao Yang (yellow card) 39'	Report	Xu Wen (yellow card) 39'; Zou Zhongting (yellow card) 85'	Stadium: TEDA Football Stadium; Attendance: 7,686; Referee: (China) Li Jun

17 June 2012 Round 13	Shanghai Shenxin	1–1	Dalian Shide	Shanghai
20:45 UTC+8	Yang Jiawei 38'; Wang Yun (yellow card) 69'	Report	Kamburov 26'; Yan Feng (yellow card) 38'; Zhao Honglüe (yellow card) 76'	Stadium: Jinshan Sports Centre; Attendance: 13,171; Referee: (China) Xu Fuxin

23 June 2012 Round 14	Shandong Luneng Taishan	3–1	Shanghai Shenxin	Jinan
20:30 UTC+8	Gilberto Macena 26'; Wang Tong 45+1'; Wu Xinghan 80'; Yuan Weiwei (yellow card) 88'	Report	Wang Jiayu (yellow card) 34'; Johnny 54'; Jiang Zhipeng (yellow card) 61'	Stadium: Shandong Provincial Stadium; Attendance: 12,019; Referee: (China) Li Haihe

29 June 2012 Round 15	Shanghai Shenxin	0–0	Liaoning Whowin	Shanghai
20:45 UTC+8	Wang Jiayu (yellow card) 40'; Johnny (yellow card) 59'	Report	Trifunović (yellow card) 59'; Wang Bo (yellow card) 88'	Stadium: Jinshan Sports Centre; Attendance: 12,522; Referee: (China) Mo Weicong

6 July 2012 Round 16	Shanghai Shenxin	1–1	Guangzhou Evergrande	Shanghai
20:45 UTC+8	Li Lei (yellow card) 6'; Zhao Zuojun (yellow card) 8'; Zhu Jiawei (yellow card) 64'; Salley (yellow card) 86'; Anselmo 90+1' (pen.)	Report	Muriqui (yellow card) 25' (goal) 61'; Zheng Zhi (yellow card) 49'; Paulão (yellow card) 56'; Zhao Xuri (yellow card) 84'	Stadium: Jinshan Sports Centre; Attendance: 11,002; Referee: (China) Li Jun

15 July 2012 Round 17	Shanghai Shenxin	2–0	Henan Jianye	Shanghai
20:45 UTC+8	Anselmo 45+1'; Antônio Flávio 58'	Report	Li Zhaonan (yellow card) 16'; Katongo (yellow card) 70'; Zhang Ke (yellow card) 84'	Stadium: Jinshan Sports Centre; Attendance: 12,870; Referee: (China) Li Haihe

22 July 2012 Round 18	Guizhou Renhe	3–1	Shanghai Shenxin	Guiyang
16:30 UTC+8	Yang Hao (yellow card) 39' (goal) 51'; Yu Hai (red card) 74'; Chen Jie 83'; Rafa Jordà (yellow card) 84'; Muslimović 86' (yellow card) 86'	Report	Johnny 5' (yellow card) 5'; Xu Wen (yellow card) 43'; Wang Jiayu (yellow card) 55'; Jiang Zhipeng (yellow card) 68'; Li Lei (yellow card) 74'	Stadium: Guiyang Olympic Sports Center

28 July 2012 Round 19	Shanghai Shenxin	–	Changchun Yatai	Shanghai
20:45 UTC+8				Stadium: Jinshan Sports Centre

5 August 2012 Round 20	Dalian Aerbin	1–1	Shanghai Shenxin	Dalian
20:00 UTC+8	Utaka 29' (pen.); Wang Jun (yellow card) 41'; Yin Lu (yellow card) 52'	Summary	Salley 82'	Stadium: Jinzhou Stadium; Attendance: 15,481; Referee: (China) Ma Ning

11 August 2012 Round 21	Shanghai Shenxin	2–0	Qingdao Jonoon	Shanghai
20:45 UTC+8	Anselmo 24'; Jaílton Paraíba 55'	Summary	Zou Zheng (yellow card) 47'; Song Bo (yellow card) 84'; Yao Jiangshan (yellow card) 90'	Stadium: Jinshan Sports Centre; Attendance: 12,693; Referee: (China) Wang Zhe

18 August 2012 Round 22	Jiangsu Sainty	1–1	Shanghai Shenxin	Jiangsu
20:40 UTC+8	Dănălache 43' (pen.); Jevtić (yellow card) 54'; Du Wenhui (yellow card) 81'	Summary	Wang Yun 29'; Zou Zhongting (yellow card) 41'; Johnny (yellow card) 42'; Salley (yellow card) 53'	Stadium: Nanjing Olympic Sports Center; Attendance: 22,385; Referee: (Thailand) Prathan Nasawang

25 August 2012 Round 23	Shanghai Shenxin	1–2	Beijing Guoan	Shanghai
20:45 UTC+8	Zou Zhongting 35' (yellow card) 85'; Wang Yun (yellow card) 44'; Jaílton Paraíba (yellow card) 74'	Summary	Xu Liang 9'; Yu Yang (yellow card) 33'; Zhou Ting (yellow card) 43'; Wang Xiaolong 53'	Stadium: Jinshan Sports Centre; Attendance: 13,774; Referee: (Thailand) Prathan Nasawang

1 September 2012 Round 19	Shanghai Shenxin	2–2	Changchun Yatai	Shanghai
20:45 UTC+8	Johnny 26'; Anselmo 90+2'	Summary	Zhang Wenzhao 18'; Perea 39'; Liu Xiaodong (yellow card) 56'; Marquinhos (yellow card) 67'	Stadium: Jinshan Sports Centre

16 September 2012 Round 24	Guangzhou R&F	3–2	Shanghai Shenxin	Guangzhou
21:00 UTC+8	Yakubu 32'; Rafael Coelho 66' (pen.) (yellow card) 69'; Sui Donglu (yellow card) 83'; Li Zhe 90+2'	Summary	Wang Jiayu (yellow card) 41'; Wang Yun 45'; Anselmo 47'; Antônio Flávio (yellow card) 61'; Zou Zhongting (yellow card) 67'; Salley (red card) 69'; Zhu Baojie (yellow card) 78'	Stadium: Yuexiushan Stadium; Attendance: 6,012; Referee: (China) Xu Fuxin

22 September 2012 Round 25	Shanghai Shenxin	1–1	Shanghai Shenhua	Shanghai
20:45 UTC+8	Zhu Baojie (yellow card) 29'; Ye Chongqiu (yellow card) 35'; Wang Yun 62'	Summary	Drogba 17'; Dai Lin (yellow card) 29'; Yu Tao (yellow card) 36'; Bo Jiajun (yellow card) 42'; Feng Renliang (yellow card) 90+5'	Stadium: Jinshan Sports Centre; Attendance: 18,060; Referee: (Vietnam) Võ Minh Trí

29 September 2012 Round 26	Hangzhou Greentown	0–0	Shanghai Shenxin	Hangzhou
20:35 UTC+8	Fabrício (yellow card) 45+1'; Tang Jiashu (yellow card) 68'	Summary	Li Lei (yellow card) 24'; Jaílton Paraíba (yellow card) 89'	Stadium: Yellow Dragon Stadium

6 October 2012 Round 27	Shanghai Shenxin	0–1	Tianjin Teda	Shanghai
20:45 UTC+8		Summary	Jovančić 63'	Stadium: Jinshan Sports Centre

20 October 2012 Round 28	Dalian Shide	1–4	Shanghai Shenxin	Dalian
16:30 UTC+8	Adriano 12' (yellow card) 86'; Zhu Ting (yellow card) 72'; Yan Feng (yellow card) 80'	Summary	Zhu Baojie (yellow card) 17'; Wang Yun 19'; Anselmo 45' (pen.), 84'; Antônio Flávio (yellow card) 47' (goal) 52'	Stadium: Jinzhou Stadium; Attendance: 10,889; Referee: (South Korea) Dae-Woo Choi

27 October 2012 Round 29	Shanghai Shenxin	1–1	Shandong Luneng Taishan	Shanghai
16:30 UTC+8	Wang Jiayu 72'; Liu Dianzuo (yellow card) 90'	Summary	Wang Qiang (yellow card) 31'; Zheng Zheng (yellow card) 74'; Du Wei 90+4'	Stadium: Jinshan Sports Centre

3 November 2012 Round 30	Liaoning Whowin	3–2	Shanghai Shenxin	Tiexi
15:30 UTC+8	Grozdanoski 24' (yellow card) 26'; Yang Shanping (yellow card) 26'; Zhao Junzhe (yellow card) 36' (goal) 88'; Yu Hanchao 51'; Zhang Lu (yellow card) 61'	Summary	Jiang Zhipeng (yellow card) 35'; Anselmo 48' (pen.), 55'; Ye Chongqiu (yellow card) 67'	Stadium: Tiexi New District Sports Center; Attendance: 26,812; Referee: (Thailand) Chaiya Mahapab

=== Chinese FA Cup ===
26 June 2012 Third round	Shanghai Shenxin	2–2 (a.e.t.) (2–4 p)	Shenyang Shenbei	Shanghai
16:40 (UTC+08)		Report		Stadium: Jinshan Sports Centre
