= 2012 Chinese Super League =

Football tournament edition

Chinese Super League
- Season: 2012
- Champions: Guangzhou Evergrande (2nd title)
- Relegated: Henan Jianye; Dalian Shide (disbanded)
- Champions League: Guangzhou Evergrande; Jiangsu Sainty; Beijing Guoan; Guizhou Moutai
- Matches: 240
- Goals: 630 (2.63 per match)
- Top goalscorer: Cristian Dănălache (23 goals)
- Biggest home win: Jiangsu Sainty 5–0 Dalian Shide (Apr. 1st, 2012); Guizhou Moutai 5–0 Hangzhou Greentown (Jun. 17th, 2012) (5 goals)
- Biggest away win: Henan Jianye 0–4 Shanghai Shenxin (Mar. 17th, 2012); Beijing Guoan 0–4 Changchun Yatai (Sept. 29th, 2012) (4 goals)
- Highest scoring: Liaoning Whowin 5–3 Dalian Aerbin (Jul. 28th, 2012) (8 goals)
- Longest winning run: Guangzhou Evergrande; Hangzhou Greentown (4 matches)
- Longest unbeaten run: Jiangsu Sainty (13 matches)
- Longest winless run: Dalian Shide; Qingdao Jonoon; Shandong Luneng; Shanghai Shenxin (7 matches)
- Longest losing run: Guangzhou R&F (4 matches)
- Highest attendance: 65,769; Jiangsu Sainty 1–1 Guangzhou Evergrande (Oct. 20th, 2012)
- Lowest attendance: 0 Liaoning Whowin 4–0 Hangzhou Greentown (Sept. 23rd, 2012)
- Average attendance: 18,740

The 2012 Chinese Super League was the ninth season since the establishment of the Chinese Super League, the nineteenth season of a professional football league and the 51st top-tier league season in China. It began on March 10, 2012 and ended on November 3, 2012.

The matches that were intended to be held on September 15 and 16, 2012 were suspended for a later date due to an international dispute between China and Japan over the Senkaku Islands. With Hangzhou Greentown having a Japanese manager and several Chinese demonstrations arising throughout China it was decided that the September 23, 2012 match against Liaoning Whowin should be played behind closed doors with the Xianghe National Football Training Base used as a neutral venue.

== Promotion and relegation ==
Teams promoted from 2011 China League One

- Dalian Aerbin
- Guangzhou R&F

Teams relegated to 2012 China League One

- Chengdu Blades
- Shenzhen Ruby

== Teams ==
=== Clubs and locations ===
Club	Head coach	City	Stadium	Capacity	2011 season	Jersey sponsor
Beijing Guoan	(Portugal) Jaime Pacheco	Beijing	Workers' Stadium	66,161	2nd	China CITIC Bank
Changchun Yatai	(Serbia) Svetozar Šapurić	Changchun	Development Area Stadium	25,000	7th	Bank of Jilin
Dalian Aerbin ^{P}	(Serbia) Aleksandar Stanojević	Dalian	Jinzhou Stadium	30,775	CL1, 1st	Shangpintang
Dalian Shide	(Portugal) Nelo Vingada	Dalian	Jinzhou Stadium	30,775	12th	Bank of Dalian
Guangzhou Evergrande ^{TH}	(Italy) Marcello Lippi	Guangzhou	Tianhe Stadium	60,151	1st	Evergrande Group
Guangzhou R&F ^{P}	(Brazil) Sérgio Farias	Guangzhou	Yuexiushan Stadium	30,000	CL1, 2nd	R&F Properties
Guizhou Moutai	(China) Gao Hongbo	Guiyang	Guiyang Olympic Sports Center	51,636	9th	Maotai
Hangzhou Greentown	(Japan) Takeshi Okada	Hangzhou	Huanglong Sports Center	52,672	8th	Daikin
Henan Jianye	(China) Shen Xiangfu	Zhengzhou	Hanghai Stadium	29,860	13th	Central China Real Estate Limited
Jiangsu Sainty	(Serbia) Dragan Okuka	Nanjing	Nanjing Olympic Sports Centre	61,443	4th	Guoxin Properties
Liaoning Whowin	(China) Ma Lin	Shenyang	Tiexi New District Sports Center	30,000	3rd	Whowin Group
Qingdao Jonoon	(South Korea) Chang Woe-ryong	Qingdao	Qingdao Tiantai Stadium	20,525	6th	Hisense
Shandong Luneng	(China) Wu Jingui (caretaker)	Jinan	Shandong Provincial Stadium	43,700	5th	Yingda Stock
Shanghai Shenhua	(Argentina) Sergio Batista	Shanghai	Hongkou Football Stadium	33,060	11th	Firefall
Shanghai Shenxin	(China) Zhu Jiong	Shanghai	Jinshan Sports Centre	30,000	14th	Bank of Shanghai
Tianjin TEDA	(Costa Rica) Alexandre Guimarães	Tianjin	TEDA Soccer Stadium	37,450	10th	Master Kong

Location of teams in 2012 Chinese Super League

=== Managerial changes ===
Team	Outgoing manager	Manner of departure	Date of vacancy	Table	Incoming manager	Date of appointment
Guangzhou R&F	(China) Li Shubin	Sacked	Pre-season	N/A	(Brazil) Sérgio Farias	Pre-season
Changchun Yatai	(China) Shen Xiangfu	Resigned	Pre-season	N/A	(Serbia) Svetozar Šapurić	Pre-season
Dalian Aerbin	(Bulgaria) Aleksandar Stankov	Sacked	Pre-season	N/A	(South Korea) Chang Woe-ryong	Pre-season
Henan Jianye	(Netherlands) Jo Bonfrère	Mutual consent	Pre-season	N/A	(Netherlands) Jan Versleijen	Pre-season
Hangzhou Greentown	(China) Wu Jingui	Resigned	Pre-season	N/A	(Japan) Takeshi Okada	Pre-season
Shandong Luneng	(Portugal) Manuel Barbosa	End of contract	Pre-season	N/A	(Netherlands) Henk ten Cate	Pre-season
Shanghai Shenhua	(Croatia) Dražen Besek	End of contract	Pre-season	N/A	(France) Jean Tigana	Pre-season
Tianjin TEDA	(Netherlands) Arie Haan	End of contract	Pre-season	N/A	(Croatia) Josip Kuže	Pre-season
Qingdao Jonoon	(South Korea) Chang Woe-ryong	End of contract	Pre-season	N/A	(Bosnia and Herzegovina) Blaž Slišković	Pre-season
Qingdao Jonoon	(Bosnia and Herzegovina) Blaž Slišković	FIFA Arbitration	13 March 2012	10th	(China) Yang Weijian (caretaker)	13 March 2012
Dalian Aerbin	(South Korea) Chang Woe-ryong	Resigned	3 April 2012	15th	(Serbia) Aleksandar Stanojević	4 April 2012
Shanghai Shenhua	(France) Jean Tigana	Resigned	26 April 2012	10th	(Democratic Republic of the Congo) Florent Ibengé (caretaker)	26 April 2012
Guangzhou Evergrande	(South Korea) Lee Jang-soo	Sacked	17 May 2012	1st	(Italy) Marcello Lippi	17 May 2012
Qingdao Jonoon	(China) Yang Weijian (caretaker)	–	24 May 2012	16th	(South Korea) Chang Woe-ryong	24 May 2012
Tianjin TEDA	(Croatia) Josip Kuže	Sacked	28 May 2012	11th	(Costa Rica) Alexandre Guimarães	1 June 2012
Shanghai Shenhua	(Democratic Republic of the Congo) Florent Ibengé (caretaker)	–	30 May 2012	9th	(Argentina) Sergio Batista	30 May 2012
Henan Jianye	(Netherlands) Jan Versleijen	Sacked	15 July 2012	16th	(China) Shen Xiangfu	15 July 2012
Shandong Luneng	(Netherlands) Henk ten Cate	Resigned	6 September 2012	12th	(China) Wu Jingui (caretaker)	6 September 2012

=== Foreign players ===
The number of foreign players is restricted to five per CSL team, including a slot for a player from AFC countries. A team can use four foreign players on the field in each game, including at least one player from the AFC country. Players from Hong Kong, Macau and Chinese Taipei are deemed to be native players in CSL.

- Players name in **bold** indicates the player was registered during the mid-season transfer window.
- Players in italics were out of the squad or left the club within the season, after the pre-season transfer window, or in the mid-season transfer window, and at least had one appearance.

Club	Player 1	Player 2	Player 3	Player 4	AFC player	Additional players^{1}	Former players^{2}
Beijing Guoan	(Brazil) Reinaldo	(Croatia) Darko Matić	(Ecuador) **Joffre Guerrón**	(Mali) **Frédéric Kanouté**			(Portugal) Manú (Senegal) François (Serbia) Andrija Kaluđerović
Changchun Yatai	(Brazil) Kassio	(Brazil) Weldon	(Bulgaria) **Marquinhos**	(Colombia) **Edixon Perea**	(Uzbekistan) Anzur Ismailov		(Colombia) John Mosquera (Serbia) Marko Ljubinković
Dalian Aerbin	(Brazil) Fábio Rochemback	(Ghana) Lee Addy	(Mali) **Seydou Keita**	(Nigeria) Peter Utaka	(Australia) **Daniel Mullen**		(Australia) Mile Sterjovski (Cameroon) Modeste M'bami (Chile) Gustavo Canales
Dalian Shide	(Brazil) Adriano	(Bulgaria) Martin Kamburov	(Portugal) Ricardo Esteves	(Zambia) James Chamanga	(South Korea) Park Dong-hyuk		
Guangzhou Evergrande	(Argentina) Darío Conca	(Brazil) Cléo	(Brazil) Muriqui	(Brazil) Paulão	(South Korea) Cho Won-hee	(Paraguay) **Lucas Barrios** (South Korea) **Kim Young-gwon**	
Guangzhou R&F	(Brazil) Davi	(Brazil) Jumar	(Brazil) Rafael Coelho	(Nigeria) **Yakubu**	(Australia) Rostyn Griffiths		(Brazil) Leonardo
Guizhou Moutai	(Bosnia and Herzegovina) Zlatan Muslimović	(Spain) Nano Rivas	(Spain) Rafa Jordà	(Spain) **Rubén Suárez**	(Australia) Dino Djulbic		(Argentina) Gustavo Rodas
Hangzhou Greentown	(Brazil) Fabrício	(Brazil) Mazola	(Brazil) Renatinho	(South Korea) Jeong Dong-ho	(South Korea) Kim Dong-jin		
Henan Jianye	(Brazil) **Adaílton**	(Brazil) Leandro Netto	(Zambia) Christopher Katongo	(Zambia) **Isaac Chansa**	(South Korea) Son Seung-joon		(Argentina) Marcos Flores (Tunisia) Enis Hajri
Jiangsu Sainty	(Belarus) **Sergey Krivets**	(Brazil) Eleílson	(Romania) Cristian Dănălache	(Serbia) Aleksandar Jevtić	(Uzbekistan) Kamoliddin Tajiev		(Serbia) Miljan Mrdaković
Liaoning Whowin	(Argentina) Pablo Brandán	(North Macedonia) Vlatko Grozdanoski	(Serbia) Miloš Trifunović		(South Korea) Kim Yoo-jin		
Qingdao Jonoon	(Brazil) **Bruno Meneghel**	(Brazil) Léo San	(Nigeria) Gabriel Melkam		(Uzbekistan) Aziz Ibragimov		(Croatia) Krunoslav Lovrek
Shandong Luneng	(Argentina) **Leonardo Pisculichi**	(Brazil) Gilberto Macena	(Mozambique) **Simão Mate Junior**	(Paraguay) **José Ortigoza**	(Lebanon) Roda Antar		(Brazil) Fabiano (Brazil) Obina
Shanghai Shenhua	(Brazil) Moisés Moura	(Colombia) **Giovanni Moreno**	(France) Nicolas Anelka	(Ivory Coast) **Didier Drogba**	(Australia) Joel Griffiths		(Bosnia and Herzegovina) Mario Božić (France) Mathieu Manset
Shanghai Shenxin	(Brazil) Anselmo	(Brazil) Antônio Flávio	(Brazil) Jaílton Paraíba	(Brazil) Johnny	(Ivory Coast) Jonas Salley^{3}		
Tianjin TEDA	(Bosnia and Herzegovina) **Vladimir Jovančić**	(North Macedonia) Veliče Šumulikoski	(Netherlands) Sjoerd Ars	(Romania) Lucian Goian	(Australia) Milan Susak		(England) Akpo Sodje

Hong Kong/Chinese Taipei/Macau players (doesn't count on the foreign player slot)

Club	Player 1
Henan Jianye	(Hong Kong) **Godfred Karikari**

- **^1** Specially, Guangzhou Evergrande can use **seven** foreign players since June 2012, for it is the only team still active at 2012 AFC Champions League.
- **^2** Foreign players who left their clubs after first half of the season.
- **^3** Jonas Salley has Australian citizenship and therefore was counted as Asian player.

== League table ==
Pos	Team	Pld	W	D	L	GF	GA	GD	Pts	Qualification or relegation
1	Guangzhou Evergrande (C)	30	17	7	6	51	30	+21	58	2013 AFC Champions League group stage (Note: Guizhou Moutai qualified for the 2013 AFC Champions League because league champions Guangzhou Evergrande also won the 2012 Chinese FA Cup.)
2	Jiangsu Sainty	30	14	12	4	49	29	+20	54	2013 AFC Champions League group stage
3	Beijing Guoan	30	14	6	10	34	35	−1	48	2013 AFC Champions League group stage
4	Guizhou Moutai	30	12	9	9	44	33	+11	45	2013 AFC Champions League group stage
5	Dalian Aerbin	30	11	11	8	51	46	+5	44 (Note: Dalian 1–2 Changchun; Changchun 1–2 Dalian)	
6	Changchun Yatai	30	12	8	10	37	40	−3	44	
7	Guangzhou R&F	30	13	3	14	47	49	−2	42	
8	Tianjin TEDA	30	10	10	10	29	30	−1	40	
9	Shanghai Shenhua	30	8	14	8	39	34	+5	38	
10	Liaoning Whowin	30	8	12	10	40	41	−1	36 (Note: Liaoning, 10pts; Hangzhou, 9pts; Shandong, 6pts, GF=4, GA=5; Qingdao, 6pts, GF=4, GA=5)	
11	Hangzhou Greentown	30	9	9	12	34	46	−12	36	
12	Shandong Luneng	30	8	12	10	46	43	+3	36	
13	Qingdao Jonoon	30	10	6	14	26	34	−8	36	
14	Dalian Shide (D, R)	30	8	10	12	39	49	−10	34	Disbanded after season (Note: On 30 November 2012, Dalian Shide were acquisited by Aerbin Group and merged into Dalian Aerbin after their owner was arrested.)
15	Shanghai Shenxin	30	6	12	12	36	35	+1	30	
16	Henan Jianye (R)	30	7	5	18	28	56	−28	26	Relegation to China League One

Source: Chinese Super League (in Chinese)
Rules for classification: 1) points; 2) goal difference; 3) number of goals scored; 4) head-to-head goals scored; 5) goal difference; 6) goals scored; 7) disciplinary points (1 point for each yellow card, 3 points for each red card). Head-to-Head: Only used at the end of the season when two or more teams need the head-to-head rules to break a tie.
(C) Champions; (D) Disqualified; (R) Relegated

== Positions by round ==
Team ╲ Round	1	2	3	4	5	6	7	8	9	10	11	12	13	14	15	16	17	18	19	20	21	22	23	24	25	26	27	28	29	30
Guangzhou Evergrande	3	10	2	2	2	2	1	1	1	1	1	1	1	1	1	1	1	1	1	1	1	1	1	1	1	2	1	1	1	1
Jiangsu Sainty	7	2	3	3	3	3	2	2	2	3	4	4	4	2	2	2	2	2	2	2	2	2	2	2	2	1	2	2	2	2
Beijing Guoan	16	9	13	6	7	4	4	4	4	4	2	3	2	3	4	3	3	5	5	4	4	5	5	5	4	4	4	3	3	3
Guizhou Moutai	5	4	5	7	8	8	9	5	5	6	5	7	6	6	3	4	4	3	3	3	3	3	3	4	5	5	5	4	4	4
Dalian Aerbin	14	12	14	15	16	11	13	13	16	13	13	14	11	11	10	12	14	10	13	13	12	9	7	7	6	9	8	7	7	5
Changchun Yatai	4	7	7	4	6	6	11	6	6	5	6	6	5	5	5	5	6	6	6	6	5	7	8	8	8	7	7	6	6	6
Guangzhou R&F	1	1	1	1	1	1	3	3	3	2	3	2	3	4	6	6	5	4	4	5	6	4	4	3	3	3	3	5	5	7
Tianjin TEDA	6	8	11	12	14	9	6	8	10	7	10	11	9	9	9	9	10	13	10	7	8	6	6	6	7	6	6	8	8	8
Shanghai Shenhua	8	13	9	10	11	14	10	10	9	12	14	9	12	12	12	13	12	12	12	9	10	10	10	9	9	8	9	9	11	9
Liaoning Whowin	2	3	4	5	4	5	5	7	7	11	8	8	7	7	7	7	8	9	8	10	11	11	13	13	12	13	11	10	13	10
Hangzhou Greentown	9	14	12	13	12	15	16	16	14	9	7	5	8	8	8	8	11	8	9	11	13	14	11	11	13	14	12	12	10	11
Shandong Luneng	12	15	15	9	10	13	8	9	12	15	15	15	15	13	15	11	9	11	11	12	9	12	12	12	11	10	13	13	14	12
Qingdao Jonoon	10	5	10	11	15	9	14	14	15	16	16	16	16	16	13	14	15	15	15	14	15	13	14	15	16	12	10	11	9	13
Dalian Shide	13	11	8	14	13	16	15	15	13	8	9	10	10	10	11	10	7	7	7	8	7	8	9	10	10	11	14	14	12	14
Shanghai Shenxin	11	6	6	8	5	7	12	12	8	10	12	13	13	15	14	15	13	14	14	15	14	15	15	14	14	15	15	15	15	15
Henan Jianye	15	16	16	16	9	12	7	11	11	14	11	12	14	14	16	16	16	16	16	16	16	16	16	16	15	16	16	16	16	16

Leader and qualification to AFC Champions League group stage
Qualification to AFC Champions League group stage
Relegation to League One
Disbanded after season

Source: Table by round (in Chinese)

== Results ==
Home \ Away	BJ	CC	DLA	DL	GZ	GZR	GZM	HZ	HN	JS	LN	QD	SD	SH	SSX	TJ
Beijing Guoan		0–4	1–0	1–0	1–0	1–0	2–1	0–2	3–0	0–1	1–1	0–0	2–1	3–2	1–0	3–1
Changchun Yatai	0–1		1–2	0–1	1–2	2–1	0–0	0–3	2–2	0–0	2–1	0–0	1–0	2–0	1–0	1–1
Dalian Aerbin	3–1	1–2		3–3	0–0	2–1	2–1	1–1	1–0	1–1	1–1	2–1	5–2	0–0	1–1	1–1
Dalian Shide	0–0	1–2	3–2		3–1	4–1	0–3	2–3	0–0	1–3	2–2	2–1	1–1	0–1	1–4	4–1
Guangzhou Evergrande	3–2	4–0	2–1	3–1		0–1	1–1	3–1	3–0	5–1	1–0	1–0	3–2	2–2	2–1	0–0
Guangzhou R&F	3–1	5–1	1–2	1–0	2–0		1–0	1–0	2–1	1–1	2–1	2–3	4–2	1–1	3–2	1–2
Guizhou Moutai	0–2	0–0	2–2	2–0	2–1	3–0		5–0	1–2	3–1	1–1	1–0	2–1	4–2	3–1	1–1
Hangzhou Greentown	1–0	2–3	1–2	1–1	2–3	2–2	1–1		2–0	1–2	2–1	0–0	0–0	1–1	0–0	1–2
Henan Jianye	2–2	2–1	1–2	0–1	1–2	3–1	3–1	1–3		0–3	1–1	1–0	2–1	1–0	0–4	0–2
Jiangsu Sainty	0–0	1–2	3–2	5–0	1–1	3–1	2–0	3–0	5–1		1–0	1–0	3–3	2–2	1–1	3–2
Liaoning Whowin	0–0	3–3	5–3	3–2	0–3	1–2	1–1	4–0	3–1	0–0		2–0	1–0	1–1	3–2	2–1
Qingdao Jonoon	0–2	1–0	1–3	1–2	2–1	3–2	0–1	0–0	3–1	1–0	3–1		0–1	1–0	2–1	2–1
Shandong Luneng	4–0	3–0	3–3	2–2	1–1	2–1	3–1	1–2	2–0	0–0	1–1	1–1		3–3	3–1	2–0
Shanghai Shenhua	3–1	1–3	2–2	0–0	0–1	1–0	2–1	5–1	2–1	1–1	3–0	3–0	0–0		0–0	0–1
Shanghai Shenxin	1–2	2–2	3–1	1–1	1–1	4–2	0–0	0–1	2–0	0–1	0–0	2–0	1–1	1–1		0–1
Tianjin TEDA	2–1	0–1	1–0	1–1	0–1	1–2	1–2	2–0	1–1	0–0	1–0	0–0	2–0	0–0	0–0	

Updated to match(es) played on 3 November 2012. Source: Results on the official website of the Chinese Super League (in Chinese)
Legend: Blue = home team win; Yellow = draw; Red = away team win.

== Goalscorers ==
=== Top scorers ===
Rank	Player	Club	Goals
1	(Romania) Cristian Dănălache	Jiangsu Sainty	23
2	(Nigeria) Peter Utaka	Dalian Aerbin	20
3	(Brazil) Rafael Coelho	Guangzhou R&F	14
4	(Brazil) Anselmo	Shanghai Shenxin	13
4	(Netherlands) Sjoerd Ars	Tianjin TEDA	13
6	(Bosnia and Herzegovina) Zlatan Muslimović	Guizhou Moutai	12
6	(Brazil) Muriqui	Guangzhou Evergrande	12
8	(Argentina) Darío Conca	Guangzhou Evergrande	10
8	(Brazil) Gilberto Macena	Shandong Luneng	10
8	(Bulgaria) Martin Kamburov	Dalian Shide	10
8	(China) Wang Yongpo	Shandong Luneng	10
8	(Zambia) James Chamanga	Dalian Shide	10

=== Hat-tricks ===
Player	For	Against	Result	Date
(Romania) Cristian Dănălache	Jiangsu Sainty	Henan Jianye	5–1	28 April 2012
(Zambia) James Chamanga	Dalian Shide	Tianjin TEDA	4–1	6 May 2012
(Brazil) Rafael Coelho	Guangzhou R&F	Changchun Yatai	5–1	27 May 2012
(Brazil) Muriqui	Guangzhou Evergrande	Jiangsu Sainty	5–1	17 June 2012
(Nigeria) Peter Utaka	Dalian Aerbin	Shandong Luneng	5–2	21 July 2012
(Romania) Cristian Dănălache	Jiangsu Sainty	Shandong Luneng	3–3	5 August 2012
(Serbia) Miloš Trifunović	Liaoning Whowin	Hangzhou Greentown	4–0	23 September 2012

== Awards ==
- Chinese Football Association Footballer of the Year: (Romania) Cristian Dănălache (Jiangsu Sainty)
- Chinese Super League Golden Boot Winner: (Romania) Cristian Dănălache (Jiangsu Sainty)
- Chinese Super League Domestic Golden Boot Award: (China) Wang Yongpo (Shandong Luneng)
- Chinese Football Association Goalkeeper of the Year: (China) Deng Xiaofei (Jiangsu Sainty)
- Chinese Football Association Young Player of the Year: (China) Zhang Xizhe (Beijing Guoan)
- Chinese Football Association Manager of the Year: (Serbia) Dragan Okuka (Jiangsu Sainty)
- Chinese Football Association Referee of the Year: (China) Tan Hai (Beijing)
- Chinese Super League Fair Play Award: Hangzhou Greentown, Jiangsu Sainty, Shandong Luneng
- Chinese Super League Team of the Year (442):
  - GK (China) Deng Xiaofei (Jiangsu Sainty)
  - DF (China) Sun Xiang (Guangzhou Evergrande), (China) Du Wei (Shandong Luneng), (Australia) Dino Djulbic (Guizhou Moutai), (China) Zheng Zheng (Shandong Luneng)
  - MF (China) Yu Hanchao (Liaoning Whowin), (China) Zheng Zhi (Guangzhou Evergrande), (Argentina) Darío Conca (Guangzhou Evergrande), (China) Wang Yongpo (Shandong Luneng)
  - FW (Romania) Cristian Dănălache (Jiangsu Sainty), (China) Gao Lin (Guangzhou Evergrande)

== Attendance ==
=== League attendance ===
Pos	Team	Total	High	Low	Average	Change
1	Guangzhou Evergrande	558,743	39,997	31,295	37,250	−18.4%
2	Beijing Guoan	553,179	51,795	21,909	36,879	−8.7%
3	Jiangsu Sainty	467,446	65,769	20,953	31,163	+81.5%
4	Guizhou Moutai	443,615	52,888	20,012	29,574	+6.2%
5	Shandong Luneng	302,224	33,453	10,783	20,148	+66.3%
6	Liaoning Whowin	279,577	27,823	0	18,638	−5.0%
7	Henan Jianye	262,884	24,086	11,557	17,526	+7.3%
8	Dalian Aerbin	236,603	25,791	7,954	15,774	n/a^{†}
9	Shanghai Shenhua	221,419	24,635	8,236	14,761	+50.2%
10	Tianjin TEDA	212,622	35,868	6,485	14,175	−22.3%
11	Changchun Yatai	190,516	21,365	10,125	12,701	−8.2%
12	Shanghai Shenxin	173,958	18,060	3,950	11,597	+10.8%
13	Dalian Shide	166,388	28,921	5,219	11,093	−35.3%
14	Hangzhou Greentown	158,443	20,073	4,396	10,563	+23.0%
15	Qingdao Jonoon	143,068	15,195	6,098	9,538	+12.7%
16	Guangzhou R&F	126,893	19,217	4,344	8,460	n/a^{†}
	League total	4,497,578	65,769	0	18,740	+6.2%

Updated to games played on 3 November 2012
Source: CSL data (in Chinese)
Notes:
^{†} Teams played previous season in CL1.

=== Top 10 attendances ===
Attendance	Round	Date	Home	Score	Away	Venue	Weekday	Time of Day
65,769	28	20 October 2012	Jiangsu Sainty	1–1	Guangzhou Evergrande	Nanjing Olympic Sports Centre	Saturday	Night
52,888	20	4 August 2012	Guizhou Moutai	2–1	Guangzhou Evergrande	Guiyang Olympic Sports Center	Saturday	Night
52,836	29	27 October 2012	Jiangsu Sainty	0–0	Beijing Guoan	Nanjing Olympic Sports Centre	Saturday	Afternoon
51,983	1	10 March 2012	Guizhou Moutai	2–1	Shandong Luneng	Guiyang Olympic Sports Center	Saturday	Night
51,795	2	16 March 2012	Beijing Guoan	3–2	Shanghai Shenhua	Workers' Stadium	Friday	Night
42,668	16	7 July 2012	Beijing Guoan	1–0	Guangzhou R&F	Workers' Stadium	Saturday	Night
42,241	4	2 April 2012	Guizhou Moutai	1–2	Henan Jianye	Guiyang Olympic Sports Center	Monday	Afternoon
41,287	6	13 April 2012	Beijing Guoan	2–1	Shandong Luneng	Workers' Stadium	Friday	Night
39,997	19	28 July 2012	Guangzhou Evergrande	2–2	Shanghai Shenhua	Tianhe Stadium	Saturday	Night
39,991	17	15 July 2012	Guangzhou Evergrande	0–1	Guangzhou R&F	Tianhe Stadium	Sunday	Night
