= Gao Jinggang =

Chinese footballer and manager

Gao Jinggang 高敬刚
Personal information
- Full name: Gao Jinggang
- Date of birth: 8 January 1971 (age 55)
- Place of birth: Dalian, Liaoning, China
- Height: 1.81 m (5 ft 11 1/2 in)
- Position: Midfielder

Team information
- Current team: Changchun Yatai (Director)

Youth career
- Dalian Team

Senior career*
| Years | Team | Apps | (Gls) |
| 1994–1995 | Dalian Wanda | 7 | (0) |
| 1996–1999 | Shaanxi Guoli | | |

Managerial career
- 2013: Changchun Yatai (caretaker)
- 2014: Changchun Yatai (caretaker)
- 2014–2015: Changchun Yatai
- * Club domestic league appearances and goals

Gao Jinggang (Chinese: 高敬刚; born 8 January 1971) is a Chinese football manager and former football player. He is currently the director of Chinese Super League side Changchun Yatai.

== Playing career ==
Gao Jinggang began his professional career with Dalian Wanda in 1994. He transferred to China League Two club Shaanxi Guoli in 1996.

== Management career ==
Gao became the youth team coach of Shaanxi Guoli after his retirement. He joined Changchun Yatai youth team system in 2004. He was called into the first team to assist temporary manager Li Xuchuan after Gao Hongbo's resignation in July 2007. Gao officially became the assistant coach of Changchun Yatai first team in December 2008. On 18 May 2013, he was appointed as the temporary manager after Li Shubin resigned from the club and led Changchun tied with Dalian Aerbin 2–2. On 22 April 2014, Gao took over as caretaker manager again after Svetozar Šapurić's departure. He took charge of two games. His first game resulted in a 0–0 away draw at Guizhou Renhe and second saw Changchun Yatai beat Shandong Luneng 1–0. Gao was promoted as the director of Changchun after Dragan Okuka became the new manager of the club in May 2014. On 21 December 2014, Changchun Yatai announced that Gao Jinggang became club's new manager for the 2015 Chinese Super League. In June 2015, he resigned from the manager position and continued to serve as director of the club.

== Honours ==
=== Player ===
Dalian Wanda

- Chinese Jia-A League: Chinese Jia-A League 1994
