= List of Guangzhou City F.C. managers =

== Key ==
Key to record:

- Pld = Matches played
- W = Matches won
- D = Matches drawn
- L = Matches lost
- GF = Goals for
- GA = Goals against
- GD = Goals difference
- Win % = Win ratio

== Shenyang Ginde & Changsha Ginde ==
- (Ukraine) Serhiy Morozov (1994)
- (China) Zhang Zengqun (1995)
- (China) Li Yingfa (1996)
- (China) Li Qiang (1996–98)
- (Brazil) Ademar Braga (1999)
- (China) Li Qiang (1999)
- (Russia) Valery Nepomnyashchy (2000 – Oct 8, 2000)
- (Poland) Henryk Kasperczak (2000–01)
- (France) Alain Laurier (2001)
- (Portugal) Toni (July 1, 2002 – Dec 31, 2002)
- (Serbia and Montenegro) Dragoslav Stepanović (June 26, 2003 – Dec 31, 2003)
- (England) Bob Houghton (Nov 25, 2005 – June 9, 2006)
- (Netherlands) Martin Koopman (2006)
- (Serbia) Milan Živadinović (2007)
- (Serbia) Slobodan Santrač (Dec 24, 2007 – June 26, 2008)
- (China) Zhu Bo(Caretaker) (June 26, 2008 – July 21, 2008)
- (China) Zhu Bo (July 21, 2008 – Oct 12, 2009)
- (China) Hao Wei (Oct 12, 2009 – June 21, 2010)
- (Serbia) Miodrag Ješić (June 21, 2010 – 2010)

== Managers ==
As of 1 January 2019

Name	Period	Pld	W	D	L	GF	GA	GD	Win%	Honours
(China) Li Shubin	Feb 27, 2011 – Nov 22, 2011	28	14	8	6	39	28	+11	50.00	
(Brazil) Sérgio Farias	Nov 22, 2011 – May 18, 2013	42	16	5	21	63	72	−9	38.10	
(China) Li Bing (caretaker)	May 19, 2013 – June 3, 2013	3	2	1	0	9	5	+4	66.67	
(Sweden) Sven-Göran Eriksson	June 4, 2013 – November 10, 2014	51	26	10	15	101	70	+31	50.98	
(Romania) Cosmin Contra	Jan 4, 2015 – July 22, 2015	30	9	7	14	37	45	−8	30.00	
(China) Li Bing (caretaker)	July 22, 2015 – Aug 24, 2015	4	1	1	2	4	5	−1	25.00	
(Serbia) Dragan Stojković	Aug 24, 2015 –	112	48	22	42	187	191	−4	42.86	
