= Šišić =

Šišić is a South Slavic surname. Notable people with the surname include:

- Aladin Šišić (born 1991), Bosnian footballer
- Aldijana Šišić (born 2000), Bosnian footballer
- Antonio Šišić (born 1983), Croatian footballer
- Emir Šišić, former pilot of SFR Yugoslav Air Force
- Ferdo Šišić (1869–1940), Croatian historian
- Ismet Šišić (born 1958), Bosnian footballer
- Mirnes Šišić (born 1981), Slovenian footballer
