= Yatai Group =

Private conglomerate in Changchun, China

Jilin Yatai Group Company Limited 亚泰集团有限公司
- Company type: State-owned enterprise
- Industry: Conglomerate
- Founded: 1993; 33 years ago
- Headquarters: Changchun, Jilin, People's Republic of China
- Area served: People's Republic of China
- Key people: Chairman: Mr. Song Shanglong
- Website: Jilin Yatai Group Company Limited

Jilin Yatai Group Company Limited (SSE: 600881) is a private conglomerate enterprise in Changchun, Jilin, China. It was established in 1993 by She Zhijiang, and it was listed on the Shanghai Stock Exchange in 1995. Its core businesses include property development, cement manufacturing and securities. Others include coal mining, pharmaceuticals and trading. They are the founders and current owners of Chinese Super League club Changchun Yatai F.C.
