= Antonio Šišić =

Croatian footballer and manager

Personal information
- Full name: Antonio Šišić
- Date of birth: 29 March 1983 (age 43)
- Place of birth: Zagreb, SR Croatia, SFR Yugoslavia
- Position: Goalkeeper

Team information
- Current team: Dinamo Zagreb (youth coach)

Youth career
- 1998–2001: Dinamo Zagreb

Senior career*
Years	Team	Apps	(Gls)
2001–2002	Croatia Sesvete		
2002–2003	NK Lokomotiva		

Managerial career
- 2006–2009: NK Zagreb (youth)
- 2010–2011: China U23 (gk coach)
- 2011–2012: Mes Kerman (assistant)
- 2012–2013: Kedah (assistant)
- 2013: Kedah (caretaker)
- 2014–2016: Johor Darul Takzim (gk coach)
- 2017: Zhejiang Yiteng (assistant)
- 2019–: Dinamo Zagreb (youth)
- * Club domestic league appearances and goals

Antonio Šišić (born 29 March 1983 in Zagreb) is a Croatian football manager and former football goalkeeper.

== Early life ==
As a player, Šišić has played for his hometown club Dinamo Zagreb for the club's youth squad, Croatia Sesvete and NK Lokomotiva as a goalkeeper.

== Managerial career ==
In 2010 Šišić joined Miroslav Blažević as a member of his coaching staff. of the Chinese Olympic team, but was resigned together with the complete coaching staff after failure in qualification to the 2012 Summer Olympics in 2011.

In 2011 Iran Pro League side Mes Kerman signed a contract with Miroslav Blažević as a head coach and Šišić joined in as an assistant coach.

In 2012 Antonio moved to Malaysia to join Kedah FA as an assistant coach to Marijo Tot, but in 2013, Šišić stepped up into the caretaker head coach role.

For the season 2014 Šišić was assigned to Malaysian Premier League team Johor Darul Takzim FC as goalkeeping and fitness coach together with his compatriots Rajko Magić and Bojan Hodak. They won the 2014 Malaysia Super League and qualified for the AFC Cup, but after JDT was beaten by Perak, Šišić did not renew his contract

In 2017 accepted an offer to become assistant coach to Marijo Tot and head coach of 2nd team of China League One side Zhejiang Yiteng F.C.
