= Rafael Coelho =

Syrian-Brazilian footballer

Personal information
- Full name: Rafael Coelho Luiz
- Date of birth: May 20, 1988 (age 38)
- Place of birth: Florianópolis, Brazil
- Height: 1.75 m (5 ft 9 in)
- Position: Forward

Youth career
- 2006: Figueirense

Senior career*
Years	Team	Apps	(Gls)
2006–2009	Figueirense	48	(22)
2010–2011	Desportivo Brasil	0	(0)
2010	→ Vasco da Gama (loan)	17	(1)
2011	→ Avaí (loan)	38	(13)
2012–2013	Guangzhou R&F	55	(25)
2014	Changchun Yatai	14	(2)
2014–2015	Buriram United	0	(0)
2015–2017	Goa	16	(7)
2016–2017	→ Náutico (loan)	10	(2)
2017	Chiangrai United	29	(12)
2019	Lampang	31	(15)
2020	Chainat Hornbill	9	(2)
Total		266	(101)

International career
2006	Brazil U18	1	(0)
- * Club domestic league appearances and goals as of 8 March 2017

Rafael Coelho Luiz (born May 20, 1988), or simply Rafael Coelho, is a Brazilian footballer who plays as a striker.

== Club career ==
=== Buriram United ===
In 2014, he joined to Buriram United in Thai Premier League, he was injured by heavy training until the club decided not to allow him to play in league title. He has played in the Toyota League Cup and FA Cup only. Before he could ask the club to cancel his contract eventually.

=== FC Goa ===
In November 2015, Rafael Coelho joined FC Goa as an injury replacement for Victor Simões. He scored 7 goals and earned a penalty for his team.

In 2016, he scored 53 goals and assisted 12 times to Mandar Rao Desai and Sahil Tavora. He earned one penalty against Chennaiyin FC and scored 1 Frederick goal against FC Pune City

=== Chiangrai United ===
In January 2017, he joined Chiangrai United.

== Career statistics ==
Appearances and goals by club, season and competition
Club	Season	League			State League		Cup		League Cup		Other		Total	
Club	Season	Division	Apps	Goals	Apps	Goals	Apps	Goals	Apps	Goals	Apps	Goals	Apps	Goals
Vasco da Gama (loan)	2010	Série A	10	0	7	1	3	0	—		—		20	1
Avaí (loan)	2011	Série A	24	6	14	7	6	5	—		—		44	18
Guangzhou R&F	2012	Chinese Super League	25	14	—		2	1	—		—		27	15
Guangzhou R&F	2013	Chinese Super League	30	11	—		1	0	—		—		31	11
Guangzhou R&F	Total		55	25	—		3	1	—		—		58	26
Changchun Yatai	2014	Chinese Super League	14	2	—		0	0	—		—		14	2
Goa	2015	Indian Super League	5	2	—		—		—		—		5	2
Goa	2016	Indian Super League	11	5	—		—		—		—		11	5
Goa	Total		16	7	—		—		—		—		16	7
Náutico (loan)	2016	Série B	4	1	5	1	1	0	—		—		10	2
Chiangrai United	2017	Thai League 1	29	12	—		3	1	4	2	—		36	15
Lampang	2019	Thai League 2	31	15	—		2	2	1	0	—		34	17
Chainat Hornbill	2020–21	Thai League 2	9	2	—		0	0	—		—		9	2
Career total			192	70	26	9	18	9	5	2	0	0	241	90

== Honours ==
=== Figueirense FC ===
- Copa do Brasil:
  - Runners-up (1): 2007
- Campeonato Catarinense (2): 2006, 2008

=== Buriram United ===
- Thai League T1
  - Winners (1) : 2015
- Thai FA Cup
  - Winners (1) : 2015
- Thai League Cup
  - Winners (1) :2015
- Kor Royal Cup
  - Winners (1) : 2015
- Mekong Club Championship
  - Winners (1) : 2015

=== FC Goa ===
- 2015 Indian Super League: runners-up
