= Johnny (footballer, born 1985) =

Brazilian footballer

Personal information
- Full name: Johnny Meg do Nascimento Osório
- Date of birth: August 6, 1985 (age 41)
- Place of birth: Lavras, Brazil
- Height: 1.85 m (6 ft 1 in)
- Position: Centre-back

Youth career
- 2000–2001: Ituano

Senior career*
| Years | Team | Apps | (Gls) |
| 2002–2006 | Ituano | | |
| 2006–2007 | Tupi | | |
| 2007–2008 | Paulista | | |
| 2008 | Vasco da Gama (loan) | 5 | (0) |
| 2008 | Náutico (loan) | | |
| 2009–2011 | Alagoano | | |
| 2009 | → União São João (loan) | | |
| 2009 | → Nautico (loan) | 19 | (1) |
| 2010–2011 | → Nanchang Bayi (loan) | 37 | (1) |
| 2012–2015 | Shanghai Shenxin | 101 | (6) |
| 2016 | Qingdao Jonoon | 28 | (1) |
| 2017 | Yunnan Lijiang | 24 | (0) |
| 2018 | Shanghai Shenxin | 18 | (0) |
| Total | | 232 | (9) |
- * Club domestic league appearances and goals as of 3 November 2018

Johnny Meg do Nascimento Osório (born August 6, 1985), known as just Johnny, is a Brazilian former professional footballer who played as a centre-back.

== Career ==
Johnny was born in Lavras.

In January 2010, the German club VfL Bochum expressed interest in signing Johnny on a loan deal, but it fell through.

On 31 January 2010, Johnny joined the newly promoted Chinese Super League side Nanchang Bayi for the start of the 2010 league season.

== Career statistics ==
As of 3 November 2018

Appearances and goals by club, season and competition
| Club | Season | League | | | State League | | Cup | | Continental | | Other | | Total | |
| Club | Season | Division | Apps | Goals | Apps | Goals | Apps | Goals | Apps | Goals | Apps | Goals | Apps | Goals |
|---|---|---|---|---|---|---|---|---|---|---|---|---|---|---|
| Nautico (loan) | 2009 | Série A | 19 | 1 | — | | 5 | 1 | — | | — | | 24 | 2 |
| Nanchang Bayi (loan) | 2010 | Chinese Super League | 18 | 0 | — | | — | | — | | — | | 18 | 0 |
| Nanchang Bayi (loan) | 2011 | Chinese Super League | 19 | 1 | — | | — | | — | | — | | 19 | 1 |
| Nanchang Bayi (loan) | Total | | 37 | 1 | — | | 1 | 0 | — | | — | | 37 | 1 |
| Shanghai Shenxin | 2012 | Chinese Super League | 29 | 3 | — | | 0 | 0 | — | | — | | 29 | 3 |
| Shanghai Shenxin | 2013 | Chinese Super League | 25 | 1 | — | | 0 | 0 | — | | — | | 25 | 1 |
| Shanghai Shenxin | 2014 | Chinese Super League | 25 | 2 | — | | 1 | 0 | — | | — | | 26 | 2 |
| Shanghai Shenxin | 2015 | Chinese Super League | 22 | 0 | — | | 0 | 0 | — | | — | | 22 | 0 |
| Shanghai Shenxin | Total | | 101 | 6 | — | | 1 | 0 | — | | — | | 102 | 6 |
| Qingdao Jonoon | 2016 | China League One | 28 | 1 | — | | 0 | 0 | — | | — | | 28 | 1 |
| Yunnan Lijiang | 2017 | China League One | 24 | 0 | — | | 0 | 0 | — | | — | | 24 | 0 |
| Shanghai Shenxin | 2018 | China League One | 18 | 0 | — | | 1 | 0 | — | | — | | 19 | 0 |
| Career total | | | 252 | 49 | 7 | 0 | 12 | 1 | 0 | 0 | 0 | 0 | 271 | 50 |
