= Changchun Yatai F.C. =

Chinese football club

Changchun Yatai 长春亚泰
- Full name: Changchun Yatai Football Club 长春亚泰足球俱乐部
- Founded: 6 June 1996; 30 years ago
- Ground: Nanling Stadium, Changchun, China
- Capacity: 41,638
- Owner: Jiarun Investment Management Co. Ltd.
- Chairman: Zeng Jiaofeng
- Head coach: Yan Feng
- League: China League One
- 2026: China League One, 9th of 16
- Website: www.yataifc.cn
Home colours	Away colours

Changchun Yatai Football Club (Chinese: 长春亚泰足球俱乐部; pinyin: Chángchūn Yàtài Zúqiú Jùlèbù) is a Chinese professional football club based in Changchun, Jilin, that competes in China League One, the second tier of Chinese football. Changchun Yatai plays its home matches at the Changchun Stadium, located within Nanguan District. The club's founder and main investor is the private Chinese conglomerate Jilin Yatai Group.

The club was formed on 6 June 1996, before making their debut in the third tier of China's football league pyramid in the 1997 league season. In 2000, they bought a position into the second division after they merged with Huizhou PLA Saonon. In 2001, they finished as runners-up within their division. However, they were denied promotion after they were embroiled in a match-fixing scandal. The club would reform and re-apply for a CFA playing license before they eventually gained promotion to China's top flight at the end of the 2005 league campaign. In the 2007 Chinese Super League, they won the league title and participated in the 2008 AFC Champions League for the first time. They have since gone on to come in second at the 2009 Chinese Super League and also participated in the 2010 AFC Champions League.

== History ==
Changchun Yatai was founded on 6 June 1996, by local conglomerate Jilin Yatai Group in Changchun, Jilin, to take part in the league system that was fully professionalized recently, which allowed private enterprises to own their own clubs. The club would select a dragon kicking a ball as their crest while assembling the club's senior team. And to make sure they had a competitive youth system, they also brought in the best youth players from Shenyang before moving them into their recently created football training base at a cost of two million yuan, while the total cost of starting the whole enterprise would end up being 20 million yuan. For the next several seasons, the club achieved very little until they bought a position into the second tier when the club took over Huizhou PLA Saonon at the beginning of the 2000 league season for fifteen million yuan, while during the season the team maintained an unbeaten home record but still finished in a disappointing fifth at the end of the season. The following season, the club's manager, Yin Tiesheng, looked like he could improve upon last years results when he guided the club to a runners-up position and what looked like promotion to the top tier for the first time. However, it was soon discovered that the 6 October 2001, game that Changchun won 6–0 against Zhejiang Green Town was fixed. This saw the club denied promotion and had all offending participants banned for a year, while the club had three months to reform and re-apply for a CFA playing license. Despite this, Yin Tiesheng stayed on and promoted future Chinese internationals Du Zhenyu, Zhang Xiaofei, and Cao Tianbao from the club's youth team, which was assembled from Shenyang, into the senior team. These players in 2003 would go on to win the Jia B (second level) title, but the club was not promoted due to the creation of the Super League.

Yin Tiesheng would leave the club in 2004 to take the Chinese U20 head coach position and Chen Jingang was brought in as the new manager. Within his reign, Chen Jingang guided the club to a runner-up spot in the China League One division in 2005 and promotion to the Super League. In the club's debut season, they finished fourth. However, Chen Jingang was relieved of his duties after he lost it in the dressing room by threatening to dock player wagers if he was unsatisfied with their performances. In 2007, Gao Hongbo was brought in as the new manager and in his debut season, he won the Chinese Super League title with them. This would see Changchun allowed entry to the 2008 AFC Champions League for the first time, along with Beijing Guoan, and played their first game against Vietnamese football club Bình Dương on 12 March 2008, in a 2–1 victory While the club finished the group runners-up only, one team was allowed to go through the knock out stages and the club crashed out of the tournament. This, unfortunately, affected the club's league performance and Gao Hongbo was fired during the season.

In September 2008, Li Shubin was brought in to manage the club and to see out the remainder of the 2008 league season. However, under his leadership, results improved and the club went on to have an industrious following campaign that saw them come runners-up at the end of the 2009 Chinese Super League campaign. Despite achieving consistently good performances for the team, the club decided that they wanted Shen Xiangfu to manage the team for the following season and within one of his first games for the club in the 2010 AFC Champions League, on 9 March 2010, Changchun beat Indonesian side Persipura Jayapura 9–0, making the victory the largest ever within the AFC Champions League for a Chinese side. Shen Xiangfu was, however, unable to guide Changchun into the knockout stages despite there being two places up for grabs and his league performances were not impressive. Despite this, the club held on to him for another season where he fared little better and at the beginning of the 2012 Chinese Super League season, the club brought in Svetozar Šapurić as the club's new manager.

In the 2018 Chinese Super League, Changchun underperformed in the last third of the season, finishing 15th. The team was relegated to the China League One. The 2019 season saw Changchun come close to earning promotion immediately back into the top tier, with a ten-game unbeaten streak in the middle of the season. Ultimately, though, the club slipped towards the end of the season and finished the campaign in fifth place. However, Changchun won the 2020 China League One title and returned to the Chinese Super League after a two-year absence.

After a five-year spell in the Chinese Super League, Changchun Yatai were relegated to China League One in the 2025 season.

== Players ==
=== First-team squad ===
As of July 2026

Note: Flags indicate national team as defined under FIFA eligibility rules; some limited exceptions apply. Players may hold more than one non-FIFA nationality.

No.	Pos.	Nation	Player
1	GK	CHN	An Zhicheng
2	DF	CHN	Chen Guoliang
3	DF	CHN	Du Kaile
4	DF	CHN	Wang Weipu (on loan from Shaanxi Union)
5	DF	CHN	Lin Chuanbin
6	DF	CHN	Li Qiang
7	MF	COL	Juan Camilo Salazar
8	MF	CHN	Wu Zhicheng
9	FW	NOR	Ohi Omoijuanfo
13	GK	CHN	Dong Yifan
14	DF	CHN	Jing Boxi
16	MF	CHN	Dilyimit Tudi
17	MF	CHN	Muhamet
18	MF	CHN	Lü Pin
19	FW	CHN	Geng Taili
20	DF	CHN	Fan Houtai
21	MF	CHN	He Xin

No.	Pos.	Nation	Player
22	DF	HKG	Clement Benhaddouche
23	GK	CHN	Wu Yake
25	MF	CHN	Chen Xuhuang
26	DF	CHN	Lu Yiming
27	DF	AUT	Constantin Reiner
29	FW	CHN	Tan Long
31	GK	CHN	Wei Kaile
32	DF	CHN	Tian Ziyi (on loan from Liaoning Tieren)
33	DF	CHN	Sun Guoliang
35	MF	CHN	Jiang Zilei
36	FW	CHN	Lü Kaiwen
37	MF	CHN	Zhou Dadi
38	FW	CHN	Sun Xipeng
39	DF	CHN	Liu Ziheng
41	DF	CHN	Wu Junjie
44	FW	CHN	Fan Chao

=== Reserves squad ===
Note: Flags indicate national team as defined under FIFA eligibility rules; some limited exceptions apply. Players may hold more than one non-FIFA nationality.

No.	Pos.	Nation	Player
—	MF	CHN	Ba Te (at (China) Tai'an Tiankuang until 31 December 2026)
—	MF	CHN	Yang Jingfan (at (China) Changchun Xidu until 31 December 2026)

No.	Pos.	Nation	Player
—	MF	CHN	Muzapar Muhta (at (China) Guangzhou Dandelion until 31 December 2026)
—	FW	CHN	Femg Zijun (at (China) Changchun Xidu until 31 December 2026)

=== Retired numbers ===
12 – Club Supporters (the 12th Man) retired in 2017.

=== Out on loan ===
Note: Flags indicate national team as defined under FIFA eligibility rules; some limited exceptions apply. Players may hold more than one non-FIFA nationality.

No.	Pos.	Nation	Player

== Coaching staff ==
Position	Staff
Head coach	(China) Yan Feng
Assistant coach	(China) Jiang Chen
Assistant coach	(China) Zhang Li
Assistant coach	(China) Liu Xiaodong
Goalkeeper coach	(China) Qin Xiao
Fitness coach	(Portugal) Mauricio Vaz

Source: Changchun Yatai F.C.

=== Managerial history ===
As of 17 April 2024.

- (China) Tang Pengju (1997–98)
- (China) Yin Tiesheng (1999–04)
- (China) Qu Gang (interim) (2004 – 26 Apr 2004)
- (China) Li Hui (26 Apr 2004 – 6 July 2004)
- (China) Chen Jingang (18 July 2004 – 2006)
- (Netherlands) Arie Schans (1 Jan 2005 – 31 Dec 2007) Team leader
- (China) Gao Hongbo (1 Jan 2007 – 5 July 2008)
- (China) Li Shubin (interim) (20 July 2008 – 31 Dec 2008)
- (Germany) Ernst Middendorp (27 July 2008 – 31 Dec 2008)
- (China) Li Shubin (interim) (Sept 2008 – 25 Dec 2008)
- (China) Li Shubin (1 Jan 2009 – 31 Dec 2009)
- (China) Shen Xiangfu (2010–11)
- (Serbia) Svetozar Šapurić (24 Nov 2011 – 28 Dec 2012)
- (China) Li Shubin (28 Dec 2012 – 20 May 2013)
- (Serbia) Svetozar Šapurić (21 May 2013 – 21 April 2014)
- (China) Gao Jinggang (interim) (21 April 2014 – 28 April 2014)
- (Serbia) Dragan Okuka (28 April 2014 – 12 Nov 2014)
- (China) Gao Jinggang (19 Dec 2014 – 12 Jun 2015)
- (Croatia) Marijo Tot (12 Jun 2015 – 31 Dec 2015)
- (Slovenia) Slaviša Stojanović (13 Jan 2016 –4 May 2016)
- (South Korea) Lee Jang-soo (6 May 2016 –4 May 2017)
- (China) Chen Jingang (4 May 2017 –6 Jun 2019)
- (Serbia) Svetozar Šapurić (9 Jun 2019 – 2 Dec 2019)
- (Uzbekistan) Samvel Babayan (2 Dec 2019 – 5 Oct 2020)
- (China) Chen Yang (5 Oct 2020 – 17 April 2024)
- (China) Xie Hui (17 April 2024 – 7 May 2025)
- (Portugal) Ricardo Soares (7 May 2025 –31 December 2025)
- (China) Yan Feng (1 January 2026 –Present)

== Honours ==
=== League ===
- Chinese Super League
  - Champions: 2007
  - Runners-up: 2009
- China League One/Jia-B League
  - Champions: 2003, 2020
  - Runners-up: 2001, 2005

== Results ==
All-time League rankings

As of the end of the 2023 season.

Year	Div	Pld	W	D	L	GF	GA	GD	Pts	Pos.	FA Cup	Super Cup	League Cup	AFC	Att./G	Stadium
1997	3	5	1	1	3	4	9	−5	3^{1}	6	DNQ	DNQ	NH			
1999	3	12	6	3	4	20	7	13	6^{1}	5	DNQ	DNQ	NH			
2000	2	22	7	10	5	28	22	6	31	5	QF	DNQ	NH			Changchun Stadium
2001	2	22	12	6	4	39	15	24	42	RU^{2}	QF	DNQ	NH			Changchun Stadium
2002	2	22	8	4	10	30	35	−5	28	8	R1	DNQ	NH			Changchun Stadium
2003	2	26	15	8	3	51	15	36	53	W^{3}	R2	DNQ	NH			Changchun Stadium
2004	2	32	13	12	7	53	34	19	51	5	R1	NH	DNQ			Development Area Stadium
2005	2	26	20	4	2	71	22	49	64	RU	R1	NH	DNQ			Changchun Stadium
2006	1	28	13	7	8	41	26	15	46	4	R1	NH	NH		8,607	Changchun Stadium
2007	1	28	16	7	5	48	25	23	55	W	NH	NH	NH		16,429	Changchun Stadium
2008	1	30	12	9	9	53	45	8	45	6	NH	NH	NH	Group	5,797	Changchun Stadium
2009	1	30	14	8	8	38	31	7	50	RU	NH	NH	NH		12,179	Development Area Stadium
2010	1	30	10	8	12	40	41	−1	38	9	NH	NH	NH	Group	10,067	Development Area Stadium
2011	1	30	11	12	7	33	31	2	45	7	R3	NH	NH		13,835	Development Area Stadium
2012	1	30	12	8	10	37	40	−3	44	6	QF	DNQ	NH		12,701	Development Area Stadium
2013	1	30	8	8	14	29	41	−12	32	14	R4	DNQ	NH		12,975	Development Area Stadium
2014	1	30	8	8	14	33	40	−7	32	13	R3	DNQ	NH		12,886	Development Area Stadium
2015	1	30	8	11	11	39	47	−8	35	10	R3	DNQ	NH		14,855	Development Area Stadium
2016	1	30	10	5	15	30	44	−14	35	12	R3	DNQ	NH		15,202	Development Area Stadium
2017	1	30	12	8	10	46	41	5	44	7	R3	DNQ	NH		16,477	Development Area Stadium
2018	1	30	8	8	14	45	56	−11	32	15	R4	DNQ	NH		18,819	Changchun Stadium
2019	2	30	15	8	7	52	42	10	53	5	R16	DNQ	NH		13,785	Changchun Stadium
2020	2	15	10	4	1	28	7	21	34	W	QF	DNQ	NH			
2021	1	22	11	6	5	31	20	11	39	4	R16	DNQ	NH			
2022	1	34	11	11	12	49	50	−1	44	13	R2	DNQ	NH			Changchun Stadium
2023	1	30	10	9	11	44	48	-4	39	9	R16	DNQ	NH		15,872	Changchun Stadium

- Did not enter in the 1998 campaign.
- ^1 In group stages. ^2 Promotion to Jia-A league was cancelled due to match fixing. ^3 No promotion.

Key

	China top division
	China second division
	China third division
W	Winners
RU	Runners-up
3	Third place
	Relegated

- Pld = Played
- W = Games won
- D = Games drawn
- L = Games lost
- F = Goals for
- A = Goals against
- Pts = Points
- Pos = Final position
- DNQ = Did not qualify
- DNE = Did not enter
- NH = Not Held
- R1 = Round 1
- R2 = Round 2
- R3 = Round 3
- R4 = Round 4
- F = Final
- SF = Semi-finals
- QF = Quarter-finals
- R16 = Round of 16
- Group = Group stage
- GS2 = Second Group stage
- QR1 = First Qualifying Round
- QR2 = Second Qualifying Round
- QR3 = Third Qualifying Round

=== Continental results ===
Season	Competition	Round	Opposition	Home	Away	Rank /Agg.
2008	AFC Champions League	Group stage	(Vietnam) Bình Dương	2–1	5–0	2nd
2008	AFC Champions League	Group stage	(Australia) Adelaide United	0–0	0–0	2nd
2008	AFC Champions League	Group stage	(South Korea) Pohang Steelers	1–0	2–2	2nd
2010	AFC Champions League	Group stage	(Japan) Kashima Antlers	0–1	0–1	3rd
2010	AFC Champions League	Group stage	(Indonesia) Persipura Jayapura	9–0	0–2	3rd
2010	AFC Champions League	Group stage	(South Korea) Jeonbuk Hyundai Motors	1–2	0–1	3rd
