= Marijo Tot =

Croatian football manager (born 1972)

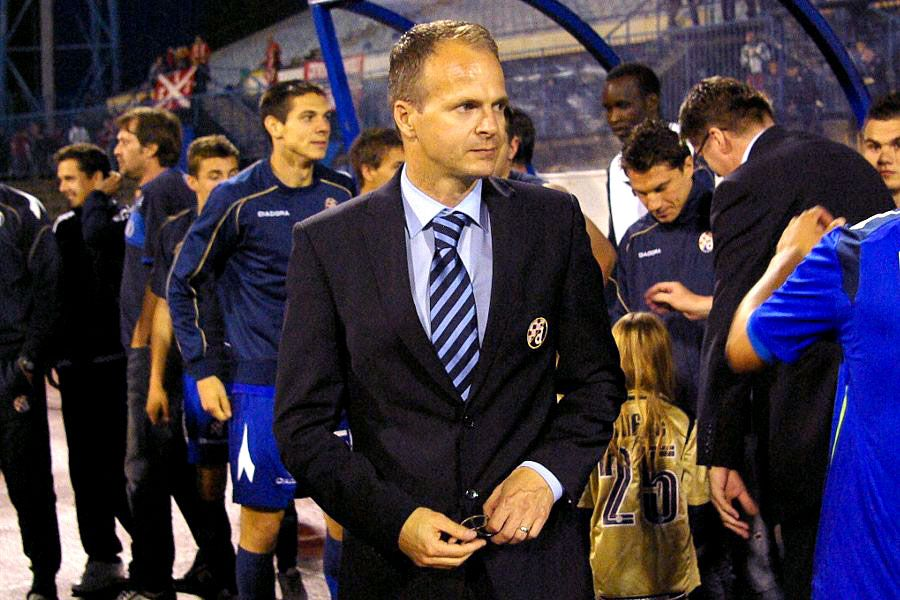
- Tot managing Dinamo Zagreb in 2011

Personal information
- Full name: Marijo Tot
- Date of birth: 2 June 1972 (age 54)
- Place of birth: Županja, SR Croatia, SFR Yugoslavia
- Position: Left back

Senior career*
Years	Team	Apps	(Gls)
1996–1997	Inker Zaprešić	20	(1)
- Publikum Celje

Managerial career
- 1999–2003: Brotnjo (assistant)
- 2003–2004: Brotnjo
- 2004–2005: Drinovci
- 2006–2008: Croatia Women
- 2008–2009: Rijeka (assistant)
- 2010–2011: Dinamo Zagreb (assistant)
- 2011: Dinamo Zagreb
- 2011: Lokomotiva
- 2012–2013: Kedah
- 2014–2015: Zhejiang Yiteng
- 2015: Changchun Yatai
- 2016–2017: Istra 1961
- 2017: Zhejiang Yiteng
- 2018–2019: Al-Ittihad (assistant)
- 2021–2022: Iran (assistant)
- 2024: Dinamo București (assistant)
- 2025–2026: HŠK Zrinjski Mostar (assistant)
- 2026–: Široki Brijeg
- * Club domestic league appearances and goals

Marijo Tot (Croatian pronunciation: [tôːt]; born 2 June 1972) is a Croatian football manager and former player who played as a left back.

== Playing career ==
As a player, he has played for Inter Zaprešić and NK Celje as a left back, retiring at the young age of 26 and enrolling into the Croatian Football Federation coaching academy.

== Managerial career ==
Three seasons from 2000 to 2003 he was assistant manager of NK Brotnjo, being part of three most successful seasons in the history of this club, playing European qualifying matches each year. In 2003, as 31 year old coach, he became the youngest manager in all Bosnian clubs ever when he took a managerial role of Bosnian Super League club NK Brotnjo

He became a manager of Croatia Women National Team from 2006 to 2008 season.

During the 2008–09 season, Tot became co-head coach of HNK Rijeka alongside Robert Rubčić. Rijeka finished the season in third place in the Croatian First Football League, qualifying for the UEFA Europa League.

Tot served as assistant coach to Vahid Halilhodžić at GNK Dinamo Zagreb during the 2010–11 season. Following Halilhodžić's departure from the club after a dispute with the club's management, Tot took charge of the first team for the remainder of the season. Under his leadership, Dinamo won both the Croatian First Football League and the Croatian Cup, completing the domestic double. Following the end of the season, Tot continued his managerial career with fellow Croatian First Football League club NK Lokomotiva Zagreb.

Later, UEFA-certified coaching instructor Marijo Tot moved to Malaysia in August 2012 to become head coach of Kedah FA. He remained in charge until July 2013, when he chose not to renew his contract with the club.

Tot spent two seasons in China, managing first Harbin Yiteng in 2014 and Changchun Yatai F.C. in 2015 season, which makes him the only Croatian manager ever to have managed two of China Super League teams.

At the end of 2016, Tot took over Croatian First League club Istra 1961. Following a series of wins and draws, the team finished the season in a stable league position, which was higher than its recent average in the Croatian First League.

Immediately after finishing his successful role as manager of Istra 1961 in June 2017 Marijo Tot accepted an offer to become manager of China League One side Zhejiang Yiteng F.C. He parted ways with the club on 31 December after securing their stay in the league.

In October 2018 he joined the Saudi Premier League football giant Al-Ittihad as assistant to the head coach Slaven Bilić, the most famous Croatian football manager.

In March 2021, at the invitation of his fellow Croatian coach Dragan Skočić, Tot joined the Iran national team. From an almost hopeless situation in the qualifiers, Iran became the first team from Asia to qualify for the 2022 World Cup in Qatar with a series of victories that drew attention to the Croatian coaching duo.

In January 2024, Tot joined Romanian club FC Dinamo București as assistant coach. During the second half of the 2023–24 season, he was part of the coaching staff as Dinamo București retained its place in the Romanian top flight after the promotion/relegation play-offs.

In August 2025, Tot joined HŠK Zrinjski Mostar as assistant coach. During the 2025–26 season, he was part of the coaching staff as Zrinjski won the Bosnia and Herzegovina Football Cup and the Bosnia and Herzegovina Supercup. The club also recorded its best European campaign in UEFA competition, reaching the knockout play-offs of the UEFA Conference League, where it faced Crystal Palace.

== Honours ==
=== Manager ===
Dinamo Zagreb

- Prva HNL: 2010–11
- Croatian Cup: 2010–11
