= Chang Woe-ryong =

South Korean footballer and coach

Chang Woe-ryong 장외룡
Personal information
- Full name: Chang Woe-ryong
- Date of birth: April 5, 1959 (age 67)
- Place of birth: Goheung, Jeonnam, South Korea
- Height: 1.78 m (5 ft 10 in)
- Position: Defender

Youth career
- Yonsei University

Senior career*
Years	Team	Apps	(Gls)
1982–1987	Daewoo Royals	67	(0)
1989	Tosu Futures		

International career
1979–1984	South Korea	30	(1)

Managerial career
- 1987: Daewoo Royals Reserve (coach)
- 1988: Ajou University (Coach)
- 1989–1991: Tosu Futures (coach)
- 1992–1994: Tosu Futures Youth
- 1995: Tosu Futures (coach)
- 1995–1996: Tosu Futures
- 1997–1999: Busan Daewoo Royals (coach)
- 1999: Busan Daewoo Royals
- 2000: Verdy Kawasaki
- 2001–2003: Consadole Sapporo (coach)
- 2002: Consadole Sapporo
- 2003: Consadole Sapporo
- 2004: Incheon United (coach)
- 2004–2006: Incheon United
- 2008: Incheon United
- 2009–2010: Omiya Ardija
- 2011: Qingdao Jonoon
- 2012: Dalian Aerbin
- 2012–2013: Qingdao Jonoon
- 2016–2017: Chongqing Lifan
- 2018: Henan Jianye
- 2019–2022: Chongqing Liangjiang Athletic
- 2025: Chongqing Tonglianglong
- * Club domestic league appearances and goals as of 10 December 2008

- Chang Woe-ryong
- Hangul: 장외룡
- Hanja: 張外龍
- RR: Jang Oeryong
- MR: Chang Oeryong

Chang Woe-ryong (Korean: 장외룡; Korean pronunciation: [tɕaŋ.we̞.ɾjoŋ]; born April 5, 1959) is a South Korean football coach and a former international player who represented his country in the 1980 AFC Asian Cup.

== Playing career ==
Chang Woe-Ryong started his career as an amateur footballer for Yonsei University and was deemed good enough to represent his country in the 1980 AFC Asian Cup where he was part of the team that came runners-up to Kuwait. In 1982 Chang would officially start his semi-professional football career when he joined Daewoo Royals and became one of the first South Korean players in the new professionalized 1983 K League. By the following season the club had become a fully professional unit and Chang would show himself to be an assured left-back as the club won the 1984 K League title. The following seasons would see Daewoo Royals as one of the dominating teams within the league, which saw Chang gain a 1985 AFC Champions League medal and another league title before he was forced to retire due to injury. By 1989 Chang had already moved into coaching until Japanese football club Tosu Futures briefly brought him out of retirement as a player-coach.

== Coaching career ==
He was confirmed as the permanent manager of Incheon United in January 2005, after taking over as caretaker manager in September 2004 following the resignation of Werner Lorant. Chang spent the whole of 2007 studying in England, and Park Lee-Chun took temporary charge of Incheon United for the year.

Chang returned to take charge of Incheon United prior to the start of the 2008 season.

On 10 December 2008, J. League club Omiya Ardija announced they had signed a contract with Chang as head coach until 2010.

On 17 December 2015, Chang accepted the invitation of Chinese Super League side Chongqing Lifan with a three-year contract. The reason he said he chose Chongqing Lifan was that the Provisional Government of the Republic of Korea was based in Chongqing during the Japanese Korean period.

In April 2018, Henan Jianye signed Chang. He was sacked in September as the team performance was below expectation.

On 18 December 2019, Chang was appointed by Chongqing Dangdai Lifan for the second time.

On 23 September 2025, Chang returned to China and being appointed as the head coach of China League One club Chongqing Tonglianglong.

== International goals ==
Results list South Korea's goal tally first.

Date	Venue	Opponent	Score	Result	Competition
February 20, 1982	Calcutta, India	Uruguay	1 goal	2–2	1982 Nehru Gold Cup

== Managerial statistics ==
Team	From	To	Record				
Team	From	To	G	W	D	L	Win %
Verdy Kawasaki	2000	2000	30	12	4	14	40.00
Consadole Sapporo	2002	2002	12	3	0	9	25.00
Consadole Sapporo	2003	2003	18	4	4	10	22.22
Omiya Ardija	2009	2010	42	10	14	18	23.81
Total			102	29	22	51	28.43

== Honours ==
=== As a player ===
Club

Daewoo Royals

- K League Classic: 1984, 1987
- AFC Champions League: 1985

Country

- AFC Asian Cup runner-up: 1980

Individual

- K League Best XI: 1983, 1985

=== As a coach ===
Club

Busan Daewoo Royals

- K League Classic runner-up: 1999

Incheon United

- K League Classic runner-up: 2005

Individual

- K League Manager of the Year Award: 2005
