= Li Yingfa =

Chinese footballer

Li Yingfa 李应发
Personal information
- Date of birth: 13 November 1944 (age 81)
- Place of birth: Dalian, Liaoning, China
- Height: 1.75 m (5 ft 9 in)
- Position: Defender

Youth career
- 1959–1965: Dalian
- 1964–?: Liaoning

Senior career*
Years	Team	Apps	(Gls)
1966–1976	Liaoning		

International career
1972–1975	China	7	(2)

Managerial career
- 1984–1991: Liaoning
- 1996: Shenyang Haishi
- 1998: Qingdao Manatee
- 1999: Chongqing Hongyan
- 1999: Dalian Wanda
- 2002: Harbin Lange
- 2003: Gansu Tianma
- 2005: Nanjing Yoyo
- 2009: Hunan Billows
- 2013: Qingdao Jonoon (assistant manager)
- * Club domestic league appearances and goals

Li Yingfa (Chinese: 李应发; Chinese: 李應發; pinyin: Lǐ Yìngfā; born 13 November 1944) is a Chinese football manager and former player. He won eight domestic champions with Liaoning between 1984 and 1991.

== Managerial career ==
After his retirement in 1976, Li Yingfa stayed at Liaoning as youth manager and assistant manager. In 1985, when Ni Jide, manager of Liaoning, was diagnosed with stomach cancer, Li stepped up as the manager, where he earned most of his honours. Liaoning remained on the league throne between 1985 and 1991 except in 1986. He and Liaoning also competed 3 times in the Asian Club Championship. In the 1985–86 series, they ranked 3rd. In 1989–90 season, Liaoning topped the Asian champion, and in the next season, they ended up as runner-up. Li stepped down as Liaoning's manager in 1991, but remained as the general manager until 1993.

In 1996, he was appointed by Shenyang Haishi.

In 1997, he went back home and joined Dalian Wanda as reserve manager.

In 1998, Qingdao Manatee signed Li.

In 1999, he took over Dalian Wanda during the season.

In 2002, he decided to move to lower levels for challenge. He signed with Harbin Lange, and won the China League Two.

In 2003, he signed with Gansu Tianma.

In 2005, he worked at Nanjing Yoyo as manager consultant.

In November 2009, he became the manager of Hunan Billows, and won the China League Two for the second time.

In 2011, he started to work for Liaoning Whowin as youth training manager.

Between 2013 and 2015, the renamed Qingdao Jonoon signed Li as consultant and assistant manager.

Since 2015, Li devoted into youth training and school football.

In 2018, Li was elected as the honorary president of the Liaoning Football Association.

== Honors ==
=== Player ===
Liaoning FC

- Asian Club Championship: 1989–90
- Chinese Jia-A League: 1985, 1987, 1988, 1989, 1990, 1991
- Chinese FA Cup: 1984, 1986

=== Manager ===
Harbin Lange

- China League Two: 2002

Hunan Billows

- China League Two: 2009
