= Ransford Addo =

Belgian professional footballer (born 1983)

Personal information
- Full name: Ransford Akwei Addo
- Date of birth: 21 July 1983 (age 43)
- Place of birth: Accra, Ghana
- Height: 1.85 m (6 ft 1 in)
- Positions: Central defender; defensive midfielder

Youth career
- 1996–1998: Ken Harrison Babies Colts FC
- 1998–1999: Bordeaux

Senior career*
Years	Team	Apps	(Gls)
2000–2005	Club Brugge		
2005–2006	SWI Harelbeke	32	(3)
2006–2007	Deinze	34	(4)
2007–2010	Royal Antwerp	124	(0)
2011	AEP Paphos	19	(0)
2012–2014	Shanghai SIPG	82	(1)
2015	Wuhan Zall	30	(2)
2016–2017	K. Berchem Sport	27	(0)
- * Club domestic league appearances and goals

Akwei Ransford Addo (born 21 July 1983) is a Ghanaian former professional footballer who played as a central defender or defensive midfielder.

== Career ==
Addo was born in Accra. He previously played for Ken Harrison Babies Colts FC, FC Girondins de Bordeaux, Club Brugge, SWI Harelbeke KMSK Deinze, Royal Antwerp F.C., AEP Paphos FC and Shanghai East Asia.

On 21 January 2015, Addo transferred to China League One side Wuhan Zall.

== Personal life ==
His older brother Eric Addo is also a former footballer.

== Honours ==
Shanghai SIPG

- China League One: 2012
