= Dragan Okuka =

Serbian footballer (born 1954)

Personal information
- Full name: Dragomir Okuka
- Date of birth: 2 April 1954 (age 72)
- Place of birth: Nevesinje, PR Bosnia and Herzegovina, FPR Yugoslavia
- Position: Midfielder

Senior career*
Years	Team	Apps	(Gls)
1971–1974	Velež Nevesinje		
1974–1985	Velež Mostar	224	(34)
1976–1977	→ Leotar (loan)	33	(4)
1985–1987	Örebro SK		
1987–1989	Motala AIF		

International career
1978–1979	Yugoslavia U21	4	(1)
1981–1982	Yugoslavia U23	5	(0)

Managerial career
- 1995–1996: Bečej
- 1996–1997: Čukarički
- 1997–1998: Obilić
- 1999–2000: Budućnost Podgorica
- 2000: Vojvodina
- 2000–2003: Legia Warsaw
- 2005–2006: Serbia and Montenegro U21
- 2006: Wisła Kraków
- 2007: Omonia
- 2008–2010: Lokomotiv Sofia
- 2010: Kavala
- 2011–2013: Jiangsu Sainty
- 2014: Changchun Yatai
- 2016: Tianjin TEDA
- 2018: Vojvodina
- 2019: Kunshan FC
Medal record
Men's Football
Representing Yugoslavia
Mediterranean Games
Gold medal – first place	1979 Split	Team
- * Club domestic league appearances and goals

Dragomir "Dragan" Okuka (Serbian Cyrillic: Драгомир Драган Окука; born 2 April 1954) is a Serbian professional football manager and former player.

As a player, he was predominantly associated with his time with Velež Mostar where he won the 1981 Yugoslav Cup before joining Swedish club Örebro SK, the place his son, professional footballer Dražen, was born before ending his career soon after.

Starting his management career with FK Bečej, Okuka would win his first coaching honours with FK Obilić when he won the 1997–98 Yugoslav league title with them. Since then he has achieved success with Polish club Legia Warsaw and managed the Serbia and Montenegro under-21 team to a fourth-place finish at the 2006 European Under-21 Championship. He has also managed several other clubs.

== Playing career ==
=== Club ===
Okuka, born in Porija (a village in the Herzegovinian town of Kalinovik), started his football career playing for Velež Nevesinje. However, he reached his affirmation at Yugoslav First League club Velež Mostar. After several seasons within Velež Mostar's midfield Okuka would go on to win the 1981 Yugoslav Cup and Balkans Cup with the club, while also gaining a BA in Law from the University of Mostar. Having spent the majority of his career in Velež Mostar (11 years, except one season he spent on loan at Leotar), Okuka would join Swedish football Division 2 side Örebro SK for a short period before ending his career with Swedish lower league side Motala AIF.

=== International ===
He represented Yugoslavia at the 1979 Mediterranean Games (winning gold) and played four matches (scoring one goal) for the Yugoslavia national under-21 team. Okuka was the captain of the under-21 side at the 1980 UEFA European Under-21 Championship where Yugoslavia (led by a coaching duo of Ivan Toplak and Stevan Vilotić) reached the semi-final where they lost to the Soviet Union.

== Coaching career ==
After he retired, he would move back to Yugoslavia and return to his first club Velež Mostar, where he took the position of general manager within the team by 1990. His time at the club was short-lived, and he would soon have to face challenges outside football when his life would be disrupted by the Bosnian War in 1992, however in early 1995 Okuka would make his first foray into management when he was hired by struggling Yugoslavian team FK Bečej and lead them to fourth within the 1994–95 league season. This would be enough for Okuka to lead the team to the 1995 UEFA Intertoto Cup, where the club were knocked out in the group stages; however, despite this, Okuka would soon attract the interests of FK Čukarički, who he stayed with for one season.

Still regarded as one of the country's most promising coaches, he would join highly ambitious football club FK Obilić despite the questionable ownership of career criminal Željko Ražnatović. While at the club he would employ a 3-5-2 formation as the club won the 1997–98 league title for the first time. Okuka would only stay with the club for one season, as Željko Ražnatović's ownership of the club came into question, and, despite having the chance to manage in the 1998–99 UEFA Champions League, Okuka decided to join FK Budućnost Podgorica the following season.

After a short stint with FK Vojvodina in 2000, Okuka would move away from the Yugoslavian league and join top tier Polish side Legia Warsaw, where he would soon get them to play in a 3-4-1-2 formation and eventually aid them to the 2001–02 Ekstraklasa league title at the end of the season. The following season wasn't so happy for Okuka, as Legia Warsaw were knocked out early within the 2002–03 UEFA Champions League while also having an underwhelming league season, which saw him replaced by Dariusz Kubicki at the end of the season.

After spending eighteen months out of coaching, he was offered the chance to manage the Serbia and Montenegro under-21 team, where he used a 4-4-2 formation to help guide the team to the 2006 UEFA European Under-21 Championship. At the tournament he would go on to guide the club to a semi-final position as the team narrowly missed the final in a penalty shoot-out against Ukraine. Once the tournament finished Okuka would return to club football with Polish side Wisła Kraków, who were looking for someone to improve upon their last season's result of second within the league. Already several games into the season expectations were still high despite the previous manager Dan Petrescu being fired after a slow start; however, Okuka was not the manager to change the club's fortunes and was fired two months later after only eight games, with the club languishing in mid-table.

Okuka would move around Europe, first with Cypriot side AC Omonia, where he played a 4-2-3-1 formation with little success before leaving the club after only several months. He wouldn't wait too long before joining Bulgarian side Lokomotiv Sofia in June 2008; however, the highlight of his reign was a short stint within the 2008–09 UEFA Cup, and, after being unable to mount a title challenge during his time with the club, they decided not to renew his contract. This saw him move to Greek side Kavala F.C., but he only stayed with the club for five mouths and was replaced with Henryk Kasperczak. Deciding not to stay within Europe, Okuka would accept the management position from Chinese top-tier club Jiangsu Sainty, who he joined half-way through their 2011 league season and within his debut season guided the club to their best-ever finish of fourth at the end of the campaign. He would strive to make Jiangsu Sainty the Chinese Super League runner-up in 2012, with only 4 points to equal Marcello Lippi's Guangzhou Evergrande at the end of the season. Okuka would receive the honour of Chinese FA Coach of the Year for his wonderful coaching performance in 2012 and he was to gain popularity among soccer fans throughout China. Okuka won his first title for Jiangsu in the 2013 Chinese FA Super Cup bu beating Super League and FA Cup winners Guangzhou Evergrande 2–1. However, Jiangsu Sainty spent most time in struggling at the edge of relegation in the 2013 season and finally avoided relegation by beating Qingdao Jonoon just one point. The club decided not to extend his contract at the end of the season.

== Honours ==
=== Player ===
Velež Mostar

- Yugoslav Cup: 1980–81
- Balkans Cup: 1980–81

=== Manager ===
Obilić

- First League of FR Yugoslavia: 1997–98

Legia Warsaw

- Ekstraklasa: 2001–02
- Polish League Cup: 2001–02

Jiangsu Sainty

- Chinese FA Super Cup: 2013

Individual

- Chinese Football Association Coach of the Year: 2012
- Serbian Coach of the Year: 2012
