= Li Shubin =

Chinese footballer and manager

Li Shubin 李树斌
Personal information
- Full name: Li Shubin
- Date of birth: January 10, 1955 (age 71)
- Place of birth: Shenyang, Liaoning, China
- Position: Striker

Senior career*
| Years | Team | Apps | (Gls) |
| 19??–1984 | Liaoning | | |

International career
| 1977 | China | | |

Managerial career
- 1995: Liaoning
- 2000: Liaoning
- 2003–2007: China (Assistant Coach)
- 2008: Liaoning Whowin (Assistant Coach)
- 2008–2009: Changchun Yatai
- 2010: Chongqing Lifan
- 2011: Guangzhou R&F
- 2013: Changchun Yatai
- 2013: Shijiazhuang Yongchang
- 2016: Shenzhen FC
- 2021-: Liaoning Tieren (Director of Youth)
- * Club domestic league appearances and goals

Li Shubin (Chinese: 李树斌; pinyin: Lǐ Shùbīn; Mandarin pronunciation: [lì ʂû pín]; born January 10, 1955) is a Chinese football manager and a former international player. In his playing career he was a striker and spent his whole career with Liaoning F.C. before retiring. In 1995, he would move into management with his old club, however he led them into relegation. Despite being released from the Head coach position Li would have a 13-year association with the club as either an assistant or brief manager of the club until he took the management position of top-tier club Changchun Yatai in 2008. Since leaving Changchun he has managed Chongqing Lifan and Guangzhou R&F before returning to Changchun to coach them in the Chinese Super League.

== Playing career ==
In his youth, Li Shubin would play for top-tier club Liaoning F.C. and in the 1978 Chinese league season see them win the championship. He would spend his whole playing career with the club until he retired in 1984, while his personal highlight came when won the top goal-scorer award in the 1980 campaign when he scored 11 goals.

== Management career ==
In 1995 his old club Liaoning F.C. gave him his first chance of senior management, however his first attempt of coaching was not a success and he relegated Liaoning to the second tier at the end of the season. While he obviously stepped down from the Head coaching position Li was allowed to remain as an assistant coach of the team until 2002 except for a brief return to the Head coaching job in 2000. He joined the China national team as an assistant coach in 2003 and worked under Arie Haan and Zhu Guanghu until he left in Zhu's regime.

Li would once again join Liaoning in May 2008 in a slightly different role as team leader and head of Chinese coaching staff, however it was not a happy return and Liaoning went on a losing streak, which saw the Head coach Werner Lorant sacked while his coaching team along with Li were dispersed of. In September 2008 Li was brought in to manage top-tier club Changchun Yatai to see out the remainder of the season, however under his leadership results improved and the club went on to have an industrious following campaign that saw them come runners-up at the end of the 2009 Chinese Super League campaign. Despite the improved results Li was allowed to leave the club at the end of the season as they brought in Shen Xiangfu to lead them in following campaign.

== Honours ==
=== Player ===
Liaoning F.C.

- Chinese Jia-A League: 1978
