= Development Area Stadium =

Sports venue in Changchun, Jilin, China

Coordinates: 43.836833°N 125.390418°E

- Interactive map of Development Area Stadium
- Full name: 经开体育场
- Location: Changchun, China
- Capacity: 23,400

Construction
- Built: 2002

Tenants
- Changchun Yatai 2004, 2009-2017; Changchun Dazhong Zhuoyue; Changchun Xidu F.C. 2023-

The Development Area Stadium (Chinese: 经开体育场) is a multi-purpose stadium in Changchun, Jilin province, China. It is located in the Jingkai Sports Centre, which also includes tennis courts.

The stadium is currently used mostly for football matches. The venue is also sometimes used for athletics. It holds 25,000 people and it was constructed in 2002. Development Area Stadium has been the home ground of local football team Changchun Yatai in several occasions. Changchun Yatai won the CSL in 2007 for the first time in their history.

It has also been home for the women's team Changchun Dazhong Zhuoyue W.F.C..

The dressing rooms were renewed in 2012.

== See also ==
- Sports in China
