= Svetozar Šapurić =

Serbian footballer and manager (1960–2024)

Personal information
- Date of birth: 28 August 1960
- Place of birth: Vrbas, AP Vojvodina, PR Serbia, FPR Yugoslavia
- Date of death: 27 December 2024 (aged 64)
- Position: Midfielder

Youth career
- 1972–1977: Vrbas

Senior career*
Years	Team	Apps	(Gls)
1977–1985	Vrbas	173	(18)
1985–1989	Vojvodina	117	(8)
1989–1993	APOEL	92	(11)
1993–1995	Anorthosis	41	(4)
1995–1996	APOEL	18	(2)
Total		441	(43)

Managerial career
- 1996: APOEL
- 1996–1999: Vojvodina (sporting director)
- 2000: APOEL
- 2001–2002: Olympiakos Nicosia
- 2003–2004: Ethnikos Achna
- 2006–2008: Ethnikos Achna
- 2008: Apollon Limassol
- 2009–2011: Ethnikos Achna
- 2011–2012: Changchun Yatai
- 2013–2014: Changchun Yatai
- 2015–2018: APOEL (sporting director)
- 2019: Changchun Yatai
- 2021–2023: Cangzhou Mighty Lions
- * Club domestic league appearances and goals

Svetozar Šapurić (Serbian Cyrillic: Светозар Шапурић; 28 August 1960 – 27 December 2024) was a Serbian football manager and player.

== Career ==
Šapurić started out at his hometown club Vrbas, spending eight seasons in the senior squad (1977–1985), before securing a move to Vojvodina. He was a member of the team that won the Yugoslav First League in 1989. Subsequently, Šapurić moved abroad to Cyprus and signed with APOEL. He later switched to Anorthosis (1993–1995), before returning to APOEL for his final season.

After finishing his playing career, Šapurić was briefly manager of APOEL in 1996. He later served as sporting director for his former club Vojvodina from September 1996 to October 1999. Afterwards, Šapurić returned to Cyprus for his second brief spell as manager of APOEL in 2000. He was also later appointed their sporting director in December 2015, remaining in charge until September 2018.

== Death ==
Šapurić died on 27 December 2024, at the age of 64.
