= List of foreign Chinese Super League players =

Players in bold are currently playing in the Chinese Super League.

== Naturalized players ==
=== Chinese-descent ===
- (England) **Nico Yennaris**, Chinese name Li Ke (2019–2024 Beijing Guoan, 2024– **Shanghai Shenhua**)
- (Norway) **John Hou Sæter**, Chinese name Hou Yongyong (2019–2022 Beijing Guoan, 2025– **Yunnan Yukun**)
- (Gabon) **Alexander N'Doumbou**, Chinese name Qian Jiegei (2019–2022 Shanghai Shenhua, 2023– **Zhejiang**)
- (England) **Tyias Browning**, Chinese name Jiang Guangtai (2019–2022 Guangzhou, 2022– **Shanghai Port**)
- (Italy) **Denny Wang**, Chinese name Wang Yi (2021–2022 Shanghai Shenhua, 2023– **Wuhan Three Towns**)
- (Portugal) Chico Chen, Chinese name Chen Jiayu (2021 Hebei)
- (Hong Kong) **Dai Wai Tsun**, Chinese name Dai Weijun (2022–2023 Shenzhen, 2023–2024, 2025 Shanghai Shenhua, 2024, 2026– **Shenzhen Peng City**)
- (Switzerland) **Ming-yang Yang**, Chinese name Yang Mingyang (2023–2024 Nantong Zhiyun, 2025– **Chengdu Rongcheng**)
- (Spain) David Wang, Chinese name Wang Jiahao (2023 Nantong Zhiyun)
- (Paraguay) Arturo Cheng, Chinese name Zheng Tuluo (2024–2025 Beijing Guoan)
- (Spain) **Alex Yang**, Chinese name Yang Xi (2025 Qingdao West Coast, 2026– **Shanghai Port**)
- (Slovenia) Marcel Petrov, Chinese name Wang Hanlong (2025 Shanghai Shenhua)
- (Belgium) **Zheng Jiacheng**, Chinese name Zheng Jiacheng (2026– **Liaoning Tieren**)
- (Japan) **Tatsuryu Natsu**, Chinese name Xia Dalong (2026– **Shenzhen Peng City**)

=== Non-Chinese-descent ===
- (Brazil) Elkeson, Chinese name Ai Kesen (2013–2015, 2019–2021 Guangzhou, 2016–2019 Shanghai Port, 2023–2024 Chengdu Rongcheng)
- (Brazil) Aloísio, Chinese name Luo Guofu (2014–2016 Shandong Taishan, 2016–2017 Hebei, 2020–2021 Guangzhou)
- (Brazil) Ricardo Goulart, Chinese name Gao Late (2015–2021 Guangzhou, 2020 Hebei)
- (Brazil) Alan, Chinese name A Lan (2015, 2016–2018, 2021 Guangzhou, 2019 Tianjin Tianhai, 2020 Beijing Guoan, 2024 Qingdao West Coast)
- (Brazil) Fernandinho, Chinese name Fei Nanduo (2015–2019, Chongqing Liangjiang Athletic, 2020–2021 Guangzhou, 2023–2024 Shandong Taishan, 2024 Shanghai Shenhua)
- (Portugal) **Pedro Delgado**, Chinese name Deerjiaduo (2018, 2021, 2024, 2026 Shandong Taishan, 2025 Chengdu Rongcheng, 2026– **Dalian Yingbo**)
- (Brazil) **Serginho**, Chinese name Sai'erjini'ao (2020–2024 Changchun Yatai, 2025– **Beijing Guoan**)

== Africa – CAF ==
=== Algeria ===
- Karim Benounes (2008 Zhejiang)

=== Angola ===
- Quinzinho (2006–2007 Xiamen Blue Lions)
- Johnson Macaba (2008 Shenzhen)
- Nando Rafael (2014 Henan)
- **Fábio Abreu** (2023– **Beijing Guoan**)
- Lucas João (2023 Shanghai Port)
- **Nelson da Luz** (2024– **Qingdao West Coast**)

=== Burkina Faso ===
- Abdoul-Aziz Nikiema (2009 Qingdao Hainiu)

=== Cameroon ===
- Clément Lebe (2004–2007 Liaoning)
- Albert Baning (2005 Shanghai United)
- Didier Njewel (2005 Shanghai United)
- Daniel Wansi (2006 Shenzhen)
- Aboubakar Oumarou (2007–2008 Guangzhou City)
- Patrick Mevoungou (2007–2008 Dalian Shide)
- Jean-Paul Ndeki (2008 Qingdao Hainiu)
- William Modibo (2009 Beijing Guoan)
- Jean Michel N'Lend (2010 Shanghai Shenhua, 2011 Liaoning)
- Modeste M'bami (2011 Changchun Yatai, 2012 Dalian Pro)
- Stéphane Mbia (2016–2017 Hebei, 2019, 2021 Wuhan Zall, 2020 Shanghai Shenhua)
- Christian Bassogog (2017–2020 Henan, 2021–2023 Shanghai Shenhua)
- Olivier Boumal (2017 Liaoning)
- Benjamin Moukandjo (2017 Jiangsu, 2018 Beijing Chengfeng)
- Christian Bekamenga (2017 Liaoning)
- Franck Ohandza (2019 Henan)
- John Mary (2019–2020 Shenzhen, 2024 Meizhou Hakka)
- Joseph Minala (2020 Qingdao)
- Donovan Ewolo (2022–2023 Zhejiang)
- **Michael Ngadeu-Ngadjui** (2023–2025 Beijing Guoan, 2026– **Chongqing Tonglianglong**)
- Serge Tabekou (2023 Qingdao Hainiu)
- Rooney Eva Wankewai (2024 Meizhou Hakka)
- Jerome Ngom Mbekeli (2025 Meizhou Hakka)
- Michael Cheukoua (2025 Meizhou Hakka)
- Didier Lamkel Zé (2025 Qingdao Hainiu)
- Basile Yamkam (2026 Wuhan Three Towns)

=== Cape Verde ===
- Ricardo (2011 Shandong Taishan)
- Dady (2013 Shanghai Shenhua)
- Hildeberto Pereira (2023 Henan)

=== Central African Republic ===
- Lobi Manzoki (2022–2023 Dalian Pro)

=== Congo (Republic of the Congo) ===
- Thievy Bifouma (2020 Shenzhen)
- **Guy Mbenza** (2026– **Liaoning Tieren**)

=== Congo DR (Democratic Republic of the Congo) ===
- Delain Sasa (2008 Liaoning)
- Alain Masudi (2009 Dalian Shide)
- M'peti Nimba (2010 Guangzhou City)
- Jeremy Bokila (2015 Guangzhou City)
- Gaël Kakuta (2016 Hebei)
- Assani Lukimya-Mulongoti (2016–2017 Liaoning)
- Cédric Bakambu (2018–2021 Beijing Guoan)
- **Oscar Maritu** (2020–2024 Cangzhou Mighty Lions, 2025– **Yunnan Yukun**)
- Mayingila Nzuzi Mata (2024 Nantong Zhiyun)

=== Côte d'Ivoire (Ivory Coast) ===
- Guillaume Dah Zadi (2007–2008 Changchun Yatai)
- Bamba Moussa (2007 Shenzhen)
- Dramane Kamaté (2007 Shenzhen)
- Sékou Tidiane Souaré (2008 Chengdu Tiancheng)
- Mariko Daouda (2008 Tianjin Jinmen Tiger, 2010 Chongqing Liangjiang Athletic)
- Didier Drogba (2012 Shanghai Shenhua)
- Davy Claude Angan (2013–2016 Zhejiang)
- Jean Evrard Kouassi (2015–2016 Shanghai Port, 2019–2021 Wuhan Yangtze River, 2023–2025 Zhejiang)
- Franck Boli (2015 Liaoning)
- Gervinho (2016–2018 Hebei)
- Kévin Boli (2018 Guizhou)

=== Egypt ===
- Mohsen Abo Gresha (2008 Zhejiang)
- Ali Ghazal (2017 Guizhou)

=== Equatorial Guinea ===
- **Luís Asué** (2025, 2026– **Shanghai Shenhua**)

=== Gabon ===
- Malick Evouna (2016 Tianjin Jinmen Tiger)
- Aaron Boupendza (2025 Zhejiang)

=== Gambia (The Gambia) ===
- Arthur Gómez (2007 Henan)
- Bubacarr Trawally (2016–2017 Yanbian Funde, 2018 Guizhou)

=== Ghana ===
- Kwame Ayew (2004–2006 Beijing Chengfeng)
- Moses Sakyi (2009 Zhejiang)
- Lee Addy (2012 Dalian Pro)
- Chris Dickson (2013 Shanghai Port)
- Ransford Addo (2013–2014 Shanghai Port)
- Asamoah Gyan (2015–2016 Shanghai Port)
- **Frank Acheampong** (2017–2020 Tianjin Jinmen Tiger, 2021–2023 Shenzhen, 2024–2025 Henan, 2026– **Dalian Yingbo**)
- Richmond Boakye (2018 Jiangsu)
- Emmanuel Boateng (2019–2021 Dalian Pro)
- Mubarak Wakaso (2020 Jiangsu, 2021–2022, 2023 Shenzhen)
- Emmanuel Agyemang-Badu (2021 Qingdao)
- **Abdul-Aziz Yakubu** (2023 Wuhan Three Towns, 2025– **Qingdao West Coast**)
- **Yaw Yeboah** (2026– **Qingdao Hainiu**)
- **Prince Ampem** (2026– **Shanghai Port**)

=== Guinea ===
- Ousmane Bangoura (2006 Guangzhou City)
- Lonsana Doumbouya (2021 Shanghai Shenhua)
- José Kanté (2022 Cangzhou Mighty Lions)

=== Guinea-Bissau ===
- Edigeison Gomes (2015–2017 Henan)
- Romário Baldé (2023 Nantong Zhiyun, 2024 Wuhan Three Towns)

=== Kenya ===
- Michael Olunga (2017 Guizhou)
- Ayub Masika (2018–2019 Beijing Chengfeng)

=== Mali ===
- Boubacar Diarra (2010 Liaoning)
- Mourtala Diakité (2010 Shandong Taishan)
- Frédéric Kanouté (2012–2013 Beijing Guoan)
- Seydou Keita (2012–2013 Dalian Pro)
- Garra Dembélé (2013 Wuhan Yangtze River)
- Mohamed Sissoko (2015 Shanghai Shenhua)
- **Mamadou Traoré** (2024 Beijing Guoan, 2025– **Dalian Yingbo**)
- **Boubacar Konté** (2026– **Beijing Guoan**)

=== Mauritania ===
- Oumar Camara (2023 Nantong Zhiyun)

=== Morocco ===
- Nabil Baha (2013 Dalian Pro)
- Abderrazak Hamdallah (2014–2015 Guangzhou City)
- Issam El Adoua (2015 Chongqing Liangjiang Athletic)
- Ayoub El Kaabi (2018–2019 Hebei)
- Zakaria Labyad (2025 Dalian Yingbo)
- Ahmed El Messaoudi (2026 Qingdao Hainiu)

=== Mozambique ===
- Simão Mate Junior (2012 Shandong Taishan)
- Zainadine Júnior (2016 Tianjin Jinmen Tiger)

=== Niger ===
- Moussa Maâzou (2015 Changchun Yatai)

=== Nigeria ===
- Kola Adams (2004–2005 Beijing Chengfeng)
- Prince Ikpe Ekong (2004 Guangzhou City)
- Sam Ayorinde (2004 Guangzhou City)
- Benedict Akwuegbu (2006 Tianjin Jinmen Tiger, 2007 Qingdao Hainiu)
- Henry Makinwa (2006 Tianjin Jinmen Tiger)
- Gabriel Melkam (2006–2007 Xiamen Blue Lions, 2008–2009 Changchun Yatai, 2011–2013 Qingdao Hainiu)
- Ortega Deniran (2006 Chongqing Liangjiang Athletic)
- Garba Lawal (2007 Guangzhou City)
- Obi Emmanuel Moneke (2008–2010 Henan)
- Edison Joseph (2009 Beijing Chengfeng)
- Pascal Kondaponi (2009 Qingdao Hainiu)
- Ernest Jeremiah Chukwuma (2009 Zhejiang)
- Alfred Emuejeraye (2010 Tianjin Jinmen Tiger)
- Akanni-Sunday Wasiu (2010 Guangzhou City)
- Victor Agali (2010 Jiangsu)
- Obiora Odita (2011 Tianjin Jinmen Tiger)
- Peter Utaka (2012–2013 Dalian Pro, 2013–2014 Beijing Guoan, 2014 Shanghai Shenxin)
- Yakubu (2012–2013 Guangzhou City)
- Bentley (2013 Wuhan Yangtze River)
- Aaron Samuel Olanare (2014–2015 Guangzhou City)
- Derick Ogbu (2014–2015 Liaoning)
- Daniel Chima Chukwu (2015 Shanghai Shenxin)
- Obafemi Martins (2016–2018, 2020 Shanghai Shenhua, 2020 Wuhan Yangtze River)
- Anthony Ujah (2016–2017 Liaoning)
- Mikel John Obi (2017–2018 Tianjin Jinmen Tiger)
- Odion Ighalo (2017–2018 Changchun Yatai, 2019 Shanghai Shenhua)
- Brown Ideye (2017 Tianjin Jinmen Tiger)
- Sone Aluko (2019 Beijing Chengfeng)
- Samuel Adegbenro (2022–2023, 2024 Beijing Guoan)
- Chisom Egbuchulam (2022–2023 Meizhou Hakka)
- Izuchukwu Anthony (2024 Nantong Zhiyun)
- Viv Solomon-Otabor (2024 Cangzhou Mighty Lions)

=== Senegal ===
- Mouchid Iyane Ly (2009 Shenzhen)
- Amado Diallo (2010 Henan)
- Adama François Sene (2011–2012 Beijing Guoan)
- Ladji Keita (2011 Beijing Guoan)
- Jacques Faty (2013 Wuhan Yangtze River)
- Demba Ba (2015–2016, 2018 Shanghai Shenhua)
- Ibrahima Touré (2016 Liaoning)
- Mbaye Diagne (2016–2017 Tianjin Jinmen Tiger)
- Papiss Cissé (2016–2018 Shandong Taishan)
- Makhete Diop (2018–2019 Beijing Chengfeng)
- Cheikh M'Bengue (2019 Shenzhen)
- André Senghor (2021 Cangzhou Mighty Lions)
- Cherif Ndiaye (2022 Shanghai Port)
- Makhtar Gueye (2026– Shanghai Shenhua)

=== Sierra Leone ===
- Mohamed Kallon (2010 Beijing Chengfeng)
- Aluspah Brewah (2010 Jiangsu)
- Gibril Sankoh (2014 Henan)
- Mohamed Buya Turay (2020 Hebei, 2021–2022 Henan)
- Issa Kallon (2022–2023 Shanghai Port, 2024 Nantong Zhiyun, 2025 Chengdu Rongcheng)

=== South Africa ===
- Bennett Mnguni (2005 Tianjin Jinmen Tiger)
- Dino Ndlovu (2022 Changchun Yatai)

=== Togo ===
- Djima Oyawolé (2004–2005 Shenzhen)
- Massamasso Tchangai (2009 Shenzhen)
- **Kodjo Aziangbe** (2026– **Shanghai Port**)

=== Tunisia ===
- Imed Ben Younes (2007 Henan)
- Enis Hajri (2012 Henan)
- Bassem Boulaâbi (2015 Zhejiang)
- Imed Louati (2015 Zhejiang)

=== Uganda ===
- Andrew Mwesigwa (2010 Chongqing Liangjiang Athletic)

=== Zambia ===
- James Chamanga (2008–2012 Dalian Shide, 2013–2017 Liaoning)
- Billy Mwanza (2009 Guangzhou City)
- Christopher Katongo (2011–2012 Henan)
- Isaac Chansa (2012 Henan)
- Stoppila Sunzu (2015 Shanghai Shenhua, 2020–2022, 2024 Cangzhou Mighty Lions, 2024–2025 Changchun Yatai)
- Jacob Mulenga (2015–2016 Cangzhou Mighty Lions)
- Evans Kangwa (2023–2024 Qingdao Hainiu)

=== Zimbabwe ===
- Nyasha Mushekwi (2018–2019 Dalian Pro, 2022–2023 Zhejiang)

== Asia – AFC ==
=== Australia ===
- Ryan Griffiths (2007–2008 Liaoning, 2009–2010 Beijing Guoan)
- Joel Griffiths (2009–2011 Beijing Guoan, 2012 Shanghai Shenhua, 2013 Qingdao Hainiu)
- Matt McKay (2009, 2013 Changchun Yatai)
- Mark Milligan (2009 Shanghai Shenhua)
- Mark Bridge (2009 Tianjin Jinmen Tiger)
- Jonas Salley (2009–2010 Beijing Chengfeng, 2011 Chengdu Tiancheng, 2012 Shanghai Shenxin, 2013–2014 Beijing Chengfeng)
- Brendon Santalab (2009, 2011 Chengdu Tiancheng)
- Chris Coyne (2010 Liaoning)
- Adam Griffiths (2010–2011 Zhejiang)
- Adam Kwasnik (2011 Chengdu Tiancheng)
- Alex Wilkinson (2011 Jiangsu)
- Bruce Djite (2011 Jiangsu)
- Dean Heffernan (2011 Liaoning)
- Dino Djulbic (2011–2012 Beijing Chengfeng)
- Mile Sterjovski (2012 Dalian Pro)
- Rostyn Griffiths (2012–2013 Guangzhou City)
- Milan Susak (2012 Tianjin Jinmen Tiger)
- Daniel Mullen (2012–2013 Dalian Pro)
- Ryan McGowan (2013–2014 Shandong Taishan, 2016 Henan, 2017 Guizhou)
- Michael Marrone (2013 Shanghai Shenxin)
- Erik Paartalu (2013 Tianjin Jinmen Tiger)
- Bernie Ibini-Isei (2013 Shanghai Port)
- Daniel McBreen (2013–2014 Shanghai Port)
- Eddy Bosnar (2013 Guangzhou City)
- Adam Hughes (2014 Shaoxing Keqiao Yuejia)
- Billy Celeski (2014 Liaoning)
- Josh Mitchell (2014–2015 Liaoning)
- Tim Cahill (2015 Shanghai Shenhua, 2016 Zhejiang)
- Adrian Leijer (2015 Chongqing Liangjiang Athletic)
- Matthew Spiranovic (2015–2016 Zhejiang)
- Michael Thwaite (2016 Liaoning)
- Trent Sainsbury (2016, 2017 Jiangsu)
- James Troisi (2016 Liaoning)
- Aleksandar Jovanović (2016 Tianjin Jinmen Tiger)
- Apostolos Giannou (2016–2017 Guangzhou City)
- Dario Vidošić (2016 Liaoning)
- James Holland (2017 Liaoning)
- Robbie Kruse (2017 Liaoning)
- Aaron Mooy (2020–2022 Shanghai Port)
- Alex Grant (2024 Tianjin Jinmen Tiger)

=== Chinese Taipei ===
- Xavier Chen (2013–2015 Beijing Chengfeng)
- Chen Po-liang (2014 Shanghai Shenhua, 2015–2016 Zhejiang, 2021 Changchun Yatai, 2024–2025 Qingdao West Coast)
- Ko Yu-ting (2015–2017 Changchun Yatai)
- Yaki Yen (2016–2017 Changchun Yatai, 2020 Qingdao, 2022 Wuhan Three Towns)
- **Tim Chow** (2019–2021 Henan, 2022–2025 Chengdu Rongcheng, 2026– **Shenzhen Peng City**)
- Will Donkin (2022–2023 Shenzhen, 2024–2025 Shanghai Port, 2025 Wuhan Three Towns)
- Wang Chien-ming (2023–2024 Qingdao Hainiu)
- **Ange Kouamé** (2026– **Liaoning Tieren**)

=== Hong Kong ===
- Ng Wai Chiu (2005 Shanghai United, 2006–2008 Shanghai Shenhua, 2009–2010 Zhejiang)
- Andy Nägelein (2010–2011 Shenzhen)
- Godfred Karikari (2012 Henan)
- Lee Chi Ho (2013 Beijing Guoan)
- Wisdom Fofo Agbo (2014 Shaoxing Keqiao Yuejia)
- Brian Fok (2014 Shanghai Shenhua)
- Bai He (2015 Cangzhou Mighty Lions)
- Jack Sealy (2016–2017 Changchun Yatai)
- Festus Baise (2017–2018 Guizhou)
- Au Yeung Yiu Chung (2017 Guizhou)
- Jean-Jacques Kilama (2017 Tianjin Tianhai)
- Andy Russell (2019 Hebei)
- Alex Tayo Akande (2019 Dalian Pro)
- Tan Chun Lok (2019–2022 Guangzhou City)
- Vas Nuñez (2022 Meizhou Hakka, 2022–2023 Dalian Pro)
- Leung Nok Hang (2022–2025 Zhejiang)
- **Yue Tze Nam** (2022–2025 Meizhou Hakka, 2026– **Beijing Guoan**)
- Li Ngai Hoi (2023 Nantong Zhiyun)
- **Sun Ming Him** (2024 Cangzhou Mighty Lions, 2025– **Tianjin Jinmen Tiger**)
- **Oliver Gerbig** (2024, 2025– **Henan**)
- **Matt Orr** (2024–2025 Shenzhen Peng City, 2026– **Shanghai Port**)
- **Shinichi Chan** (2024– **Shanghai Shenhua**)
- Wong Ho Chun (2025 Qingdao Hainiu)
- **Raphaël Merkies** (2025– **Shandong Taishan**)
- **Alexander Jojo** (2025 Shanghai Port, 2026– **Chengdu Rongcheng**)
- **Tsui Wang Kit** (2025– **Yunnan Yukun**)
- **Ng Yu Hei** (2026– **Chongqing Tonglianglong**)
- **Ngan Cheuk Pan** (2026– **Qingdao Hainiu**)
- **Barak Braunshtain** (2026– **Qingdao West Coast**)

=== Iran ===
- Morteza Pouraliganji (2015 Tianjin Jinmen Tiger, 2020–2021 Shenzhen)

=== Iraq ===
- Hussein Alaa Hussein (2009 Qingdao Hainiu, 2010 Shenzhen)
- Nashat Akram (2014 Dalian Pro)

=== Japan ===
- Takashi Rakuyama (2011 Shenzhen)
- Seiichiro Maki (2011 Shenzhen)
- Masashi Oguro (2013 Zhejiang)
- Sergio Escudero (2015 Jiangsu)
- **Takahiro Kunimoto** (2026– **Liaoning Tieren**)

=== Lebanon ===
- Roda Antar (2009–2013 Shandong Taishan, 2014 Jiangsu, 2015 Zhejiang)
- Mak Lind (2014 Tianjin Jinmen Tiger)

=== North Korea ===
- Kim Yong-jun (2008 Chengdu Tiancheng)
- Ryang Myong-il (2009 Chengdu Tiancheng)

=== Philippines ===
- Javier Patiño (2015–2017 Henan Jianye)

=== South Korea ===
- Lee Kyung-soo (2004 Sichuan First City)
- Lee Jae-won (2008–2010 Qingdao Hainiu)
- Song Tae-lim (2009–2010 Henan)
- Jeon Woo-keun (2009 Dalian Shide)
- Ahn Jung-hwan (2009–2011 Dalian Shide)
- Lee Tae-young (2009 Qingdao Hainiu)
- Sim Jae-won (2009 Guangzhou City)
- Kim Eun-jung (2009 Guangzhou City)
- Lee Sang-il (2009 Guangzhou City)
- Lee Se-in (2010 Changchun Yatai)
- Park Jae-hong (2010 Jiangsu)
- Lee Jon-ming (2010 Qingdao Hainiu)
- Woo Joo-young (2010 Guangzhou City)
- Cho Se-kwon (2010 Chongqing Liangjiang Athletic)
- Lee Yoon-sub (2010 Qingdao Hainiu)
- Jeon Kwang-jin (2011 Dalian Shide)
- Kim Jin-kyu (2011 Dalian Shide)
- Cho Won-hee (2011–2012 Guangzhou, 2013 Wuhan Yangtze River)
- Lee Joon-yeop (2011 Henan)
- Kim Yoo-jin (2011–2012, 2015 Liaoning)
- Ko Jae-sung (2011 Shanghai Shenxin)
- Kwon Jip (2011 Tianjin Jinmen Tiger)
- Song Chong-gug (2011 Tianjin Jinmen Tiger)
- Park Dong-hyuk (2012 Dalian Shide)
- Jeong Dong-ho (2012 Zhejiang)
- Kim Dong-jin (2012–2013 Hangzhou Greentown)
- Son Seung-joon (2012 Henan)
- Kim Young-gwon (2012–2018 Guangzhou)
- Ha Dae-sung (2014–2015 Beijing Guoan)
- Jang Hyun-soo (2014–2017 Guangzhou City)
- Park Jong-woo (2014–2015 Guangzhou City)
- Son Dae-ho (2014 Zhejiang)
- Lee Ji-nam (2014 Henan)
- Yoon Sin-young (2014 Jiangsu)
- Cho Byung-kuk (2014 Shanghai Shenhua)
- Lim You-hwan (2014–2015 Shanghai Shenxin)
- Noh Hyung-goo (2014 Shaoxing Keqiao Yuejia)
- Choi Hyun-yeon (2014 Shaoxing Keqiao Yuejia)
- Park Ju-sung (2015 Beijing Chengfeng)
- Kim Ju-young (2015–2016 Shanghai Port, 2017 Hebei)
- Cho Yong-hyung (2015–2016 Cangzhou Mighty Lions)
- Jung In-whan (2015 Henan)
- Ha Tae-goon (2016 Yanbian Funde)
- Yoon Bit-garam (2016–2017 Yanbian Funde)
- Kim Seung-dae (2016–2017 Yanbian Funde)
- Oh Beom-seok (2016 Zhejiang)
- Jung Woo-young (2016–2017 Chongqing Liangjiang Athletic)
- Kim Kee-hee (2016–2017 Shanghai Shenhua)
- Hong Jeong-ho (2016–2017 Jiangsu)
- Kim Hyung-il (2017 Guangzhou)
- Kwon Kyung-won (2017–2019 Tianjin Tianhai)
- Hwang Seok-ho (2017 Tianjin Jinmen Tiger)
- Hwang Il-su (2017 Yanbian Funde)
- Kim Min-jae (2019–2021 Beijing Guoan)
- Park Ji-soo (2019–2020 Guangzhou, 2023–2025 Wuhan Three Towns)
- Kim Shin-wook (2019–2021 Shanghai Shenhua)
- Song Ju-hun (2019 Tianjin Tianhai, 2020 Shenzhen)
- Kim Sung-hwan (2020 Henan)
- Son Jun-ho (2021–2023 Shandong Taishan)
- Kang Sang-woo (2022–2023 Beijing Guoan)
- Kim Min-woo (2022–2023 Chengdu Rongcheng)
- Lim Chai-min (2022 Shenzhen)
- **Park Jin-seob** (2026– **Zhejiang**)

=== Syria ===
- Adel Abdullah (2010 Shanghai Shenxin)
- Ali Diab (2010 Shanghai Shenhua)
- Abdulkader Dakka (2011 Shanghai Shenhua)
- George Mourad (2013 Qingdao Hainiu)
- Firas Al-Khatib (2013–2014 Shanghai Shenhua)
- Ahmad Al Saleh (2017 Henan)

=== Uzbekistan ===
- Aleksandr Kletskov (2009 Jiangsu, 2010 Tianjin Jinmen Tiger)
- Aleksey Nikolaev (2009 Shenzhen)
- Sadriddin Abdullaev (2009 Changchun Yatai)
- Zayniddin Tadjiyev (2009 Tianjin Jinmen Tiger)
- Farhod Tadjiyev (2010 Tianjin Jinmen Tiger)
- Asqar Jadigerov (2010 Shanghai Shenxin)
- Islom Inomov (2010 Liaoning)
- Anzur Ismailov (2011–2018 Changchun Yatai)
- Ildar Magdeev (2011 Qingdao Hainiu)
- Murod Kholmukhamedov (2011 Dalian Shide)
- Kamoliddin Tajiev (2011–2013 Jiangsu)
- Aziz Ibragimov (2011–2012 Qingdao Hainiu)
- Egor Krimets (2013, 2016–2017 Beijing Guoan)
- Shavkat Mullajanov (2013 Liaoning)
- Sherzod Karimov (2013 Qingdao Hainiu)
- Artyom Filiposyan (2014 Liaoning)
- Igor Sergeev (2016 Beijing Guoan)
- Odil Ahmedov (2017–2020 Shanghai Port, 2020 Tianjin Jinmen Tiger, 2021 Cangzhou Mighty Lions)
- Dostonbek Tursunov (2021 Chongqing Liangjiang Athletic)

== Europe – UEFA ==
=== Albania ===
- Nevil Dede (2008 Guangzhou City)
- Hamdi Salihi (2013 Jiangsu)
- Valdet Rama (2017 Yanbian Funde)
- **Albion Ademi** (2024–2025 Tianjin Jinmen Tiger, 2026– **Shenzhen Peng City**)

=== Armenia ===
- Varazdat Haroyan (2024 Qingdao West Coast)

=== Austria ===
- Marko Arnautović (2019–2021 Shanghai Port)
- Richard Windbichler (2022–2023 Chengdu Rongcheng)
- Peter Žulj (2022–2024 Changchun Yatai)
- Markus Pink (2023 Shanghai Port)
- Manprit Sarkaria (2025 Shenzhen Peng City)

=== Azerbaijan ===
- Branimir Subašić (2009 Changchun Yatai)

=== Belarus ===
- Alyaksandr Khatskevich (2004 Tianjin Jinmen Tiger)
- Raman Kirenkin (2008 Liaoning)
- Vyacheslav Hleb (2009 Shanghai Shenhua, 2010 Shenzhen)
- Sergey Krivets (2012–2013 Jiangsu)

=== Belgium ===
- Kevin Oris (2014 Liaoning)
- Axel Witsel (2017–2018 Tianjin Tianhai)
- Yannick Carrasco (2018–2019 Dalian Pro)
- Mousa Dembélé (2019–2021 Guangzhou City)
- Marouane Fellaini (2019–2023 Shandong Taishan)
- **Landry Dimata** (2026–**Chongqing Tonglianglong**)

=== Bosnia and Herzegovina ===
- Alen Avdić (2004 Liaoning)
- Sead Bučan (2004–2005 Guangzhou City)
- Damir Ibrić (2007 Qingdao Hainiu)
- Ninoslav Milenković (2010 Qingdao Hainiu)
- Vladimir Jovančić (2012–2013 Tianjin Jinmen Tiger)
- Zlatan Muslimović (2012–2014 Beijing Chengfeng)
- Mario Božić (2012 Shanghai Shenhua)
- Zvjezdan Misimović (2013–2014, 2015 Beijing Chengfeng)
- Sejad Salihović (2015 Beijing Chengfeng)
- **Samir Memišević** (2020–2021 Hebei, 2022 Beijing Guoan, 2026– **Qingdao West Coast**)
- Toni Šunjić (2020–2023 Henan)
- Elvis Sarić (2023–2025 Qingdao Hainiu)

=== Bulgaria ===
- Zoran Janković (2004–2007 Dalian Shide)
- Predrag Pažin (2005–2007 Shandong Taishan)
- Ivo Trenchev (2007–2008 Henan)
- Svetoslav Petrov (2007 Changchun Yatai)
- Yordan Varbanov (2008–2009 Zhejiang)
- Kaloyan Karadzhinov (2008 Dalian Shide)
- Georgi Chilikov (2008 Dalian Shide)
- Yanko Valkanov (2009 Shanghai Shenhua, 2010 Shenzhen)
- Martin Kamburov (2010–2012 Dalian Shide)
- Marquinhos (2012 Changchun Yatai)
- Georgi Iliev (2015 Cangzhou Mighty Lions)
- Borislav Tsonev (2022–2023 Dalian Pro)
- Petar Vitanov (2023 Tianjin Jinmen Tiger)

=== Croatia ===
- Ivan Bulat (2004 Chongqing Liangjiang Athletic, 2005–2007 Beijing Chengfeng)
- Josip Bulat (2004 Qingdao Hainiu)
- Darko Čordaš (2006 Chongqing Liangjiang Athletic)
- Jurica Vučko (2007 Tianjin Jinmen Tiger)
- Darko Matić (2007–2008 Tianjin Jinmen Tiger, 2009–2015 Beijing Guoan, 2016 Changchun Yatai)
- Igor Budiša (2007 Qingdao Hainiu)
- Igor Tkalčević (2008 Chengdu Tiancheng)
- Vedran Celiščak (2008 Dalian Shide)
- Stjepan Jukić (2010 Qingdao Hainiu)
- Frane Čačić (2010 Guangzhou City)
- Bruno Šiklić (2010 Chongqing Liangjiang Athletic)
- Ivan Brečević (2010 Beijing Chengfeng)
- Krunoslav Lovrek (2012 Qingdao Hainiu)
- Leon Benko (2014 Dalian Pro)
- Sammir (2015–2016 Jiangsu, 2016 Zhejiang)
- Goran Milović (2016–2017 Chongqing Liangjiang Athletic)
- Mislav Oršić (2016 Changchun Yatai)
- Nikica Jelavić (2017–2018 Guizhou)
- Ivan Santini (2019–2020 Jiangsu)
- Matej Jonjić (2021 Shanghai Shenhua)
- Ante Majstorović (2021 Shanghai Port)
- Marko Dabro (2022 Beijing Guoan)
- Franko Andrijašević (2022–2025 Zhejiang)
- Mile Škorić (2023 Cangzhou Mighty Lions, 2024 Tianjin Jinmen Tiger)
- David Puclin (2023–2024 Nantong Zhiyun)
- Ivan Fiolić (2024 Tianjin Jinmen Tiger)
- Darick Kobie Morris (2024–2025 Meizhou Hakka)
- Filip Benković (2026 Shenzhen Peng City)
- **Marko Tolić** (2026– **Zhejiang**)

=== Czech Republic ===
- Marek Jarolím (2013 Zhejiang)
- Jan Rezek (2013 Changchun Yatai)
- Bořek Dočkal (2017 Henan)

=== Denmark ===
- Ken Ilsø (2014 Guangzhou City)
- Lasse Vibe (2018 Changchun Yatai)
- Jores Okore (2021–2023 Changchun Yatai)

=== England ===
- Akpo Sodje (2012 Tianjin Jinmen Tiger)
- Ayo Obileye (2024 Cangzhou Mighty Lions)

=== Estonia ===
- Andres Oper (2009 Shanghai Shenhua)

=== France ===
- Nicolas Ouédec (2004 Shandong Taishan)
- Laurent Leroy (2007 Shanghai Shenhua)
- Jean-Philippe Caillet (2009 Tianjin Jinmen Tiger)
- Michaël Murcy (2010 Shandong Taishan)
- Nicolas Anelka (2012 Shanghai Shenhua)
- Mathieu Manset (2012 Shanghai Shenhua)
- Guillaume Hoarau (2013 Dalian Pro)
- Julien Gorius (2016 Changchun Yatai)
- Jean-Philippe Mendy (2016 Cangzhou Mighty Lions)
- Anthony Modeste (2017–2018 Tianjin Tianhai)
- Romain Alessandrini (2020–2021 Qingdao, 2022–2023 Shenzhen)
- Eddy Gnahoré (2020 Wuhan Yangtze River)
- Jules Iloki (2021 Tianjin Jinmen Tiger)
- **Ibrahim Amadou** (2023–2025 Shanghai Shenhua, 2026– **Chongqing Tonglianglong**)
- Jean-David Beauguel (2024 Qingdao West Coast)
- Wylan Cyprien (2025 Changchun Yatai)
- Béni Nkololo (2026 Beijing Guoan)
- **Malcom Edjouma** (2026– **Qingdao Hainiu**)
- **Antoine Leautey** (2026– **Wuhan Three Towns**)

=== Germany ===
- Jörg Albertz (2004 Shanghai Shenhua)
- Carsten Jancker (2006 Shanghai Shenhua)
- Mike Hanke (2014 Beijing Chengfeng)
- Felix Bastians (2018–2020 Tianjin Jinmen Tiger)
- Sandro Wagner (2019 Tianjin Jinmen Tiger)
- Dejan Radonjić (2020–2021 Qingdao, 2022 Tianjin Jinmen Tiger)
- Streli Mamba (2022–2023 Dalian Pro)

=== Georgia (Georgia (country)) ===
- Elguja Lobjanidze (2023 Meizhou Hakka)
- **Valeri Qazaishvili** (2024– **Shandong Taishan**)

=== Greece ===
- Avraam Papadopoulos (2015 Shanghai Shenhua)

=== Hungary ===
- Zoltán Kovács (2004 Shenzhen)
- Krisztián Kenesei (2004–2006 Beijing Guoan)
- Szabolcs Huszti (2014–2015, 2017 Changchun Yatai)
- Ákos Elek (2015 Changchun Yatai)
- Richárd Guzmics (2017 Yanbian Funde)
- Tamás Kádár (2020 Shandong Taishan, 2021 Tianjin Jinmen Tiger)

=== Iceland ===
- Viðar Kjartansson (2015 Jiangsu)
- Sölvi Ottesen (2015 Jiangsu, 2017 Guangzhou City)
- Eiður Guðjohnsen (2015 Cangzhou Mighty Lions)
- Elías Már Ómarsson (2025 Meizhou Hakka)

=== Israel ===
- Liron Zarko (2009 Chongqing Liangjiang Athletic)
- Eran Zahavi (2016–2020 Guangzhou City)
- Dia Saba (2019–2020 Guangzhou City)
- Yahav Gurfinkel (2024–2025 Chengdu Rongcheng)
- **Eden Kartsev** (2024– **Shenzhen Peng City**)

=== Italy ===
- Damiano Tommasi (2009 Tianjin Jinmen Tiger)
- Fabio Firmani (2011 Beijing Chengfeng)
- Alessandro Diamanti (2014 Guangzhou)
- Alberto Gilardino (2014 Guangzhou)
- Graziano Pellè (2016–2020 Shandong Taishan)
- Gabriel Paletta (2018–2019 Jiangsu)
- Éder (2018–2020 Jiangsu)
- Stephan El Shaarawy (2019–2020 Shanghai Shenhua)
- Martin Boakye (2024 Qingdao Hainiu)
- Andrea Compagno (2024 Tianjin Jinmen Tiger)

=== Kazakhstan ===
- Georgy Zhukov (2022–2024 Cangzhou Mighty Lions)

=== Kosovo ===
- Erton Fejzullahu (2014–2015 Beijing Guoan)

=== Malta ===
- John Hutchinson (2011 Chengdu Tiancheng)

=== Montenegro ===
- Igor Gluščević (2006 Shandong Taishan)
- Čedomir Mijanović (2007 Guangzhou City)
- Petar Bojović (2010 Chongqing Liangjiang Athletic)
- Dejan Damjanović (2014 Jiangsu, 2014–2015 Beijing Guoan)
- Radomir Đalović (2014 Shanghai Shenxin)
- Fatos Bećiraj (2014 Changchun Yatai)
- Nebojša Kosović (2022–2024 Meizhou Hakka)
- Asmir Kajević (2022 Wuhan Yangtze River)
- Miloš Milović (2024 Qingdao Hainiu)

=== Netherlands ===
- Dave de Jong (2004 Dalian Shide)
- Fred Benson (2010 Shandong Taishan)
- Sjoerd Ars (2012 Tianjin Jinmen Tiger)
- Elvis Manu (2019 Beijing Chengfeng)
- Marko Vejinović (2021 Tianjin Jinmen Tiger)
- **Deabeas Owusu-Sekyere** (2022–2023 Cangzhou Mighty Lions, 2024–2025 Zhejiang, 2026– **Shenzhen Peng City**)
- Timo Letschert (2024–2025 Chengdu Rongcheng)

=== North Macedonia ===
- Stojan Ignatov (2008 Beijing Guoan)
- Slavčo Georgievski (2008 Zhejiang)
- Vlatko Grozdanoski (2012 Liaoning)
- Veliče Šumulikoski (2012 Tianjin Jinmen Tiger)
- Arijan Ademi (2023 Beijing Guoan)
- **Isnik Alimi** (2025– **Dalian Yingbo**)

=== Norway ===
- Ole Selnæs (2019–2020 Shenzhen, 2021 Hebei)
- Ola Kamara (2019 Shenzhen)
- Adama Diomande (2021 Cangzhou Mighty Lions)
- Fredrik Ulvestad (2021 Qingdao)
- Ohi Omoijuanfo (2025 Changchun Yatai)

=== Poland ===
- Marek Zając (2004–2008 Shenzhen)
- Bogdan Zając (2006–2007 Shenzhen)
- Emmanuel Olisadebe (2008–2010 Henan)
- Krzysztof Mączyński (2014–2015 Beijing Chengfeng)
- Mateusz Zachara (2015 Henan)
- Adrian Mierzejewski (2018 Changchun Yatai, 2019–2020 Chongqing Liangjiang Athletic, 2020 Guangzhou City, 2021 Shanghai Shenhua, 2022–2023 Henan)

=== Portugal ===
- Joaquim Ferraz (2004 Qingdao Hainiu)
- Joca (2007 Qingdao Hainiu)
- Hugo Carreira (2009 Qingdao Hainiu)
- Manú (2012 Beijing Guoan)
- Ricardo Esteves (2012 Dalian Shide)
- Rúben Micael (2015–2016 Cangzhou Mighty Lions)
- Ricardo Carvalho (2017 Shanghai Port)
- Ricardo Vaz Tê (2017–2018 Henan)
- José Fonte (2018 Dalian Pro)
- Orlando Sá (2018 Henan)
- Dyego Sousa (2019 Shenzhen)
- Daniel Carriço (2020–2021 Wuhan Yangtze River)
- João Silva (2021 Hebei)
- **João Carlos Teixeira** (2023– **Shanghai Shenhua**)
- **Wilson Manafá** (2024– **Shanghai Shenhua**)
- Guga (2024–2025 Beijing Guoan)
- **Xadas** (2024– **Tianjin Jinmen Tiger**)
- Joca (2024 Wuhan Three Towns)
- Nené (2025 Yunnan Yukun)
- **Guilherme Ramos** (2026– **Beijing Guoan**)
- **Pedro Álvaro** (2026– **Shandong Taishan**)

=== Romania ===
- Constantin Schumacher (2004 Chongqing Liangjiang Athletic)
- Viorel Domocoş (2004 Chongqing Liangjiang Athletic)
- Bogdan Mara (2004 Tianjin Jinmen Tiger)
- Ionel Gane (2004 Tianjin Jinmen Tiger)
- Dan Alexa (2004–2005 Beijing Guoan)
- Ionel Dănciulescu (2005 Shandong Taishan)
- Marian Aliuţă (2006 Changchun Yatai)
- Dumitru Mitu (2007 Qingdao Hainiu, 2008 Changchun Yatai)
- Ovidiu Burcă (2008 Beijing Guoan)
- Marius Radu (2008 Tianjin Jinmen Tiger)
- Alin Chița (2009 Tianjin Jinmen Tiger)
- Cristian Dănălache (2011–2013 Jiangsu)
- Marius Bilaşco (2011 Tianjin Jinmen Tiger)
- Lucian Goian (2012 Tianjin Jinmen Tiger)
- Marius Niculae (2013 Shandong Taishan)
- Cristian Tănase (2015 Tianjin Jinmen Tiger)
- Eric Bicfalvi (2015 Liaoning)
- Marius Constantin (2015 Jiangsu)
- **Nicolae Stanciu** (2022–2023 Wuhan Three Towns, 2026– **Dalian Yingbo**)
- **Andrei Burcă** (2025– **Yunnan Yukun**)
- **Alexandru Ioniță** (2025– **Yunnan Yukun**)
- **Alexandru Mitriță** (2025– **Zhejiang**)
- Alexandru Tudorie (2025 Wuhan Three Towns)
- **Alexandru Cîmpanu** (2026– **Chongqing Tonglianglong**)

=== Russia ===
- **Yegor Sorokin** (2026– **Chengdu Rongcheng**)

=== Scotland ===
- Maurice Ross (2010 Beijing Guoan)
- Derek Riordan (2011 Beijing Chengfeng)

=== Serbia ===
- Miodrag Pantelić (2004 Sichuan Guancheng, 2005–2006 Dalian Shide, 2007 Beijing Guoan)
- Branko Jelić (2004–2005 Beijing Guoan, 2006–2007 Xiamen Blue Lions)
- Vladimir Matijašević (2004 Shandong Taishan)
- Darko Anić (2004 Shandong Taishan)
- Branko Savić (2004 Liaoning)
- Branimir Petrović (2005 Shandong Taishan)
- Goran Trobok (2005 Shanghai Shenhua)
- Marko Zorić (2005–2006, 2010–2011 Tianjin Jinmen Tiger, 2009 Shenzhen)
- Aleksandar Živković (2006–2009 Shandong Taishan, 2010 Shenzhen)
- Ivan Jovanović (2006 Shanghai Shenhua)
- Velibor Kopunović (2006 Chongqinq Liangjiang Athletic, 2006 Qingdao Hainiu)
- Despot Visković (2006 Qingdao Hainiu)
- Saša Zimonjić (2006 Xiamen Blue Lions)
- Pavle Delibašić (2006 Chongqing Liangjiang Athletic)
- Dejan Sarić (2007 Qingdao Hainiu)
- Saša Zorić (2007 Guangzhou City, 2007 Xiamen Blue Lions)
- Nikola Malbaša (2007 Shandong Taishan)
- Branko Baković (2007 Shandong Taishan)
- Miodrag Anđelković (2007 Dalian Shide)
- Darko Drinić (2007 Dalian Shide)
- Vidak Bratić (2007 Tianjin Jinmen Tiger)
- Miljan Mrdaković (2008–2009 Shandong Taishan, 2012 Jiangsu)
- Dragan Stančić (2008, 2009 Qingdao Hainiu)
- Milan Nikolić (2008 Guangzhou City)
- Dragan Vukmir (2008 Dalian Shide)
- Marko Sočanac (2009 Qingdao Hainiu)
- Miloš Bajalica (2010 Henan, 2010–2011 Beijing Chengfeng)
- Goran Gavrančić (2010 Henan)
- Siniša Radanović (2010 Shandong Taishan)
- Borko Veselinović (2010 Dalian Shide)
- Ivan Vukomanović (2010 Qingdao Hainiu)
- Dušan Đokić (2010 Chongqing Liangjiang Athletic)
- Miloš Mihajlov (2010 Changchun Yatai)
- Nenad Mladenović (2010 Guangzhou City)
- Radomir Koković (2011 Changchun Yatai)
- Vladimir Bogdanović (2011 Liaoning)
- Aleksandar Jevtić (2011–2013 Jiangsu, 2014 Liaoning)
- Andrija Kaluđerović (2012 Beijing Guoan)
- Marko Ljubinković (2012 Changchun Yatai)
- Miloš Trifunović (2012–2013 Liaoning)
- Novak Martinović (2013 Wuhan Yangtze River)
- Miloš Stojanović (2013 Wuhan Yangtze River)
- Miloš Bosančić (2015 Zhejiang)
- Nikola Petković (2016–2017 Yanbian Funde)
- Ognjen Ožegović (2016 Changchun Yatai)
- Nemanja Gudelj (2017 Tianjin Jinmen Tiger, 2018 Guangzhou)
- Marko Perović (2018 Guangzhou City)
- Duško Tošić (2018–2020 Guangzhou City)
- Nemanja Pejčinović (2018 Changchun Yatai)
- Jagoš Vuković (2020–2021 Qingdao)
- Stefan Mihajlović (2022 Cangzhou Mighty Lions)
- Rade Dugalić (2022–2023 Meizhou Hakka, 2024–2025 Shenzhen Peng City)
- Aleksa Vukanović (2022 Meizhou Hakka)
- Nemanja Bosančić (2022–2023 Dalian Pro)
- Nemanja Čović (2023–2024 Henan)
- Aleksandar Andrejević (2023 Qingdao Hainiu)
- Nenad Lukić (2023 Changchun Yatai)
- Đorđe Denić (2023–2024 Henan)
- Marko Šarić (2023 Qingdao Hainiu)
- Lazar Rosić (2024–2025 Changchun Yatai)
- Stefan Veličković (2024 Nantong Zhiyun)
- Nikola Radmanovac (2024–2025 Qingdao Hainiu)
- **Uroš Spajić** (2025, 2026– **Beijing Guoan**)
- Branimir Jočić (2025 Meizhou Hakka)
- **Nemanja Anđelković** (2026– **Qingdao Hainiu**)
- **Lazar Tufegdžić** (2026– **Qingdao Hainiu**)

=== Slovakia ===
- Tomáš Medveď (2005 Guangzhou City)
- Tomáš Oravec (2011 Beijing Chengfeng)
- Marek Hamšík (2019–2020 Dalian Pro)

=== Slovenia ===
- Ermin Šiljak (2004 Dalian Shide)
- Blaž Puc (2006 Guangzhou City)
- Darko Kremenovič (2007 Henan)
- Aleksander Rodić (2009 Shanghai Shenhua, 2010 Qingdao Hainiu)
- Tomislav Mišura (2010 Qingdao Hainiu)
- Janez Zavrl (2011 Shenzhen)
- Ermin Rakovič (2011 Shenzhen)
- Luka Žinko (2013–2014 Zhejiang)
- Miral Samardžić (2016 Henan)
- Denis Popović (2020–2021 Qingdao)
- Robert Berić (2022–2023 Tianjin Jinmen Tiger, 2024–2025 Changchun Yatai)
- Andrej Kotnik (2023 Meizhou Hakka)

=== Spain ===
- Roberto Batres (2010 Shanghai Shenhua)
- Nano Rivas (2012–2013 Beijing Chengfeng)
- Rafa Jordà (2012–2013 Beijing Chengfeng)
- Rubén Suárez (2012 Beijing Chengfeng)
- Ibán Cuadrado (2013–2014 Shanghai Port)
- Míchel (2015 Guangzhou City)
- Jonathan Soriano (2017–2018 Beijing Guoan)
- Mario Suárez (2017–2018 Guizhou)
- Rubén Castro (2017 Guizhou)
- Jonathan Viera (2018–2019, 2020–2021 Beijing Guoan)
- Cala (2018 Henan)
- David Andújar (2022–2023 Tianjin Jinmen Tiger)
- Tomás Pina (2022–2023 Henan)
- Fran Mérida (2022–2023 Tianjin Jinmen Tiger)
- Edu García (2024–2025 Shenzhen Peng City)
- Jorge Ortiz (2024 Shenzhen Peng City)
- Lluís López (2025 Shandong Taishan)
- **Óscar Melendo** (2025, 2026– **Shanghai Port**)
- **Alberto Quiles** (2025– **Tianjin Jinmen Tiger**)
- **Cristian Salvador** (2025, 2026– **Tianjin Jinmen Tiger**)
- Juan Antonio Ros (2025 Tianjin Jinmen Tiger)
- José Martínez (2025 Yunnan Yukun)
- Jordi Mboula (2026 Henan)
- **Aitor Córdoba** (2026– **Tianjin Jinmen Tiger**)
- Jaume Grau (2026 Tianjin Jinmen Tiger)

=== Sweden ===
- Daniel Nannskog (2004 Sichuan First City)
- Tobias Hysén (2014–2015 Shanghai Port)
- Niklas Backman (2014 Dalian Pro)
- Imad Khalili (2014 Shanghai Port)
- Magnus Eriksson (2015 Beijing Chengfeng)
- Gustav Svensson (2016, 2021 Guangzhou City)
- Osman Sow (2016 Henan)
- Marcus Danielson (2020–2021 Dalian Pro)
- Sam Larsson (2020–2021 Dalian Pro)
- Samuel Armenteros (2024 Shenzhen Peng City)
- **Pavle Vagić** (2026– **Liaoning Tieren**)
- **Carlos Strandberg** (2026– **Qingdao Hainiu**)

=== Switzerland ===
- Oumar Kondé (2009 Chengdu Tiancheng)
- **Cephas Malele** (2023–2024 Shanghai Shenhua, 2025– **Dalian Yingbo**)

=== Turkey ===
- Ahmet Dursun (2004 Tianjin Jinmen Tiger)
- Ersan Gülüm (2016 Hebei)
- Burak Yılmaz (2016–2017 Beijing Guoan)

=== Ukraine ===
- Oleksandr Holovko (2004 Qingdao Hainiu)
- Serhiy Konovalov (2004 Qingdao Hainiu)
- Victor Brovchenko (2006–2007 Liaoning)
- Júnior Moraes (2017 Tianjin Tianhai)

== North & Central America, Caribbean – CONCACAF ==
=== Costa Rica ===
- Erick Scott (2008 Shanghai Shenhua)
- Johnny Woodly (2009–2010 Chongqing Liangjiang Athletic, 2010 Changchun Yatai)
- Rodolfo Rodríguez (2010 Tianjin Jinmen Tiger)
- Porfirio López (2010 Dalian Shide)
- José Luis López (2010 Dalian Shide)
- Michael Barrantes (2015 Shanghai Shenxin)
- Felicio Brown Forbes (2022 Wuhan Yangtze River, 2023 Qingdao Hainiu)

=== Curaçao ===
- Richairo Živković (2020 Guangzhou City, 2021 Changchun Yatai)
- Jürgen Locadia (2023 Cangzhou Mighty Lions)

=== Guadeloupe ===
- Olivier Fauconnier (2007 Henan)
- **Kilian Bevis** (2026– **Wuhan Three Towns**)

=== Guatemala ===
- Marvin Ávila (2009 Beijing Chengfeng)

=== Honduras ===
- Saul Martínez (2004–2005, 2007 Shanghai Shenhua, 2006 Shanghai United)
- Luis Ramírez (2006 Shanghai Shenhua, 2008–2009 Guangzhou, 2010–2011 Zhejiang)
- Elvis Scott (2006–2008, 2009 Changchun Yatai, 2008 Beijing Guoan)
- Samuel Caballero (2006–2010 Changchun Yatai)
- Víctor Mena (2006 Changchun Yatai)
- Walter Martínez (2007–2008, 2010–2011 Beijing Guoan)
- Luis Santamaría (2007 Beijing Guoan, 2008 Qingdao Hainiu)
- Emil Martínez (2008 Shanghai Shenhua, 2009 Beijing Guoan, 2010 Zhejiang)
- Mitchel Brown (2008 Qingdao Hainiu)
- José Güity (2008 Shanghai Shenhua)
- Jerry Palacios (2010 Zhejiang)
- Mauricio Sabillón (2010 Zhejiang)
- Julio César de León (2010–2011 Shandong Taishan)
- Randy Diamond (2011 Zhejiang)
- Rony Flores (2011 Shenzhen)
- Rubilio Castillo (2023 Nantong Zhiyun)

=== Jamaica ===
- Demar Stewart (2008–2009 Chengdu Tiancheng)
- Roen Nelson (2009 Chengdu Tiancheng)
- Ryan Johnson (2014 Henan)

=== Martinique ===
- Cédric Sabin (2010 Beijing Chengfeng)
- Yoann Arquin (2021 Wuhan Yangtze River)

=== Mexico ===
- Jesús Godínez (2024 Nantong Zhiyun)

=== Suriname ===
- Tjaronn Chery (2017–2018 Guizhou)
- Tyrone Conraad (2023–2024 Meizhou Hakka)

=== Trinidad and Tobago ===
- Kevaughn Connell (2010 Shanghai Shenxin)

=== United States ===
- Lyle Martin (2010 Beijing Chengfeng)
- Macario Hing-Glover (2023 Shanghai Shenhua)

== Oceania – OFC ==
=== New Zealand ===
- Chris Killen (2010–2011 Shenzhen)
- Ivan Vicelich (2010 Shenzhen)

== South America – CONMEBOL ==
=== Argentina ===
- José Luis Díaz (2004 Tianjin Jinmen Tiger)
- Oscar Bazán (2005 Qingdao Hainiu)
- Javier Musa (2006 Beijing Guoan)
- Roberto Demus (2006 Wuhan Optics Valley)
- Matías Marchesini (2008 Shanghai Shenhua)
- César La Paglia (2008 Wuhan Optics Valley)
- Hernán Barcos (2009 Shanghai Shenhua, 2009 Shenzhen, 2015 Tianjin Jinmen Tiger)
- Alfredo Cano (2009 Shanghai Shenhua)
- Sebastián Setti (2010 Changchun Yatai)
- Matías Villavicencio (2010 Shanghai Shenhua)
- Luciano Olguín (2010–2011 Tianjin Jinmen Tiger)
- Bruno Casanova (2011 Chengdu Tiancheng)
- Luis Salmerón (2011 Shanghai Shenhua)
- Facundo Pérez Castro (2011 Shanghai Shenhua)
- Marcos Flores (2011–2012 Henan)
- Darío Conca (2011–2013 Guangzhou, 2015–2016 Shanghai Shenhua)
- Gustavo Rodas (2012 Beijing Chengfeng)
- Pablo Brandán (2012–2013 Liaoning)
- Leonardo Pisculichi (2012–2013 Shandong Taishan)
- Rolando Schiavi (2013 Shanghai Shenhua)
- Patricio Toranzo (2013 Shanghai Shenhua)
- Pablo Caballero (2013 Qingdao Hainiu)
- Walter Montillo (2014–2016 Shandong Taishan)
- Pablo Batalla (2014–2015 Beijing Guoan)
- Matías Iglesias (2014 Changchun Yatai)
- Lucas Viatri (2014 Shanghai Shenhua)
- Esteban Solari (2014 Dalian Pro)
- Emmanuel Gigliotti (2015–2016 Chongqing Liangjiang Athletic)
- Ezequiel Lavezzi (2016–2019 Hebei)
- Carlos Tevez (2017 Shanghai Shenhua)
- Javier Mascherano (2018–2019 Hebei)
- Augusto Fernández (2018–2019 Beijing Chengfeng)
- Nicolás Aguirre (2018 Chongqing Liangjiang Athletic)
- Nicolás Gaitán (2018 Dalian Pro)
- Matías Vargas (2022–2024 Shanghai Port)
- Guido Carrillo (2022 Henan)

=== Bolivia ===
- Milton Coimbra (2006 Beijing Guoan)
- Jair Reinoso (2011 Shenzhen)
- Ronald Rivero (2011 Shenzhen)
- Marcelo Martins Moreno (2015–2016 Changchun Yatai)

=== Brazil ===
- Adilson (2004–2005 Dalian Shide)
- Zé Alcino (2004–2005 Beijing Chengfeng)
- Nelson Simões (2004–2005 Shenzhen)
- Ozeias (2004 Shenzhen)
- Vicente (2005, 2007 Wuhan Optics Valley, 2006, 2008–2009 Beijing Chengfeng, 2010 Shanghai Shenhua)
- Gilsinho (2005–2007 Wuhan Optics Valley, 2008 Henan)
- Anderson Bill (2005 Wuhan Optics Valley)
- Rafael (2005 Wuhan Optics Valley)
- Marcos Aurélio (2006 Tianjin Jinmen Tiger)
- Tiago (2006 Shanghai United, 2007–2008 Beijing Guoan, 2010 Shenzhen)
- Aderaldo (2006 Shanghai United, 2007 Beijing Guoan, 2010 Shanghai Shenhua)
- Jonas (2006 Shanghai United)
- Renato Ribas (2006 Shanghai United)
- Hilton Mineiro (2006 Shanghai Shenhua)
- Rafael Jaques (2006 Wuhan Optics Valley)
- Carlos Eduardo (2006 Wuhan Optics Valley)
- Taílson (2006 Guangzhou City)
- Alex Alves (2006 Guangzhou City)
- Fabiano (2006 Wuhan Optics Valley, 2006 Qingdao Hainiu)
- Alysson (2007 Beijing Guoan)
- Charles Chad (2007 Tianjin Jinmen Tiger)
- Márcio Santos (2007 Tianjin Jinmen Tiger)
- Bruno Lança (2007 Wuhan Optics Valley)
- Roberto Aleixo (2007 Wuhan Optics Valley)
- Sandro (2007–2008, 2010 Guangzhou City, 2009 Shandong Taishan)
- Argel Fuchs (2007 Zhejiang)
- Eduardo Marques (2007 Zhejiang)
- Wágner (2007 Zhejiang)
- Marcelo Rosa (2007 Zhejiang)
- Tico (2007 Zhejiang)
- Ronny (2007 Shanghai Shenhua, 2007–2009 Beijing Chengfeng)
- Rafael Scheidt (2007–2008 Beijing Chengfeng)
- Sergio Júnior (2007 Beijing Chengfeng)
- Milson (2007 Shenzhen)
- Luciano Ratinho (2008 Shandong Taishan)
- Jonhes (2008 Tianjin Jinmen Tiger)
- Éber Luís (2008–2009 Tianjin Jinmen Tiger, 2010 Jiangsu, 2011 Qingdao Hainiu)
- Diego Barcelos (2008–2009 Guangzhou)
- José Duarte (2008 Guangzhou, 2009–2010 Chongqing Liangjiang Athletic)
- Valdo (2008–2009 Zhejiang, 2010 Beijing Guoan, 2011 Liaoning)
- Douglas (2008 Henan)
- Tales (2008 Guangzhou City)
- Edson (2008 Shenzhen)
- Felipe Menegon (2008 Shenzhen)
- Auricélio Neres (2008–2009 Chengdu Tiancheng)
- Denílson Souza (2008 Chengdu Tiancheng)
- Jefferson Feijão (2008 Liaoning, 2009 Guangzhou City)
- Zé Roberto (2008 Liaoning)
- Danilo (2008 Wuhan Optics Valley)
- Gustavo Papa (2008 Wuhan Optics Valley)
- Leandro Netto (2009–2012 Henan)
- Agnaldo (2009 Chengdu Tiancheng)
- Eleílson (2009–2015 Jiangsu)
- Geninho (2009–2010 Jiangsu)
- Alemão (2009 Jiangsu)
- Diogo Barcelos (2009 Guangzhou)
- Adonis (2009 Shenzhen)
- Renan Marques (2009 Shenzhen)
- Estevão Toniato (2009 Beijing Chengfeng)
- Andrezinho (2009 Zhejiang)
- Aílton (2009 Chongqing Liangjiang Athletic)
- Pedro Henrique (2010 Jiangsu)
- Célio Santos (2010 Beijing Chengfeng)
- Andrezinho (2010 Liaoning)
- Felipe Conceição (2010 Liaoning)
- Beto (2010 Shanghai Shenxin)
- Alex (2010 Shanghai Shenxin)
- Johnny (2010–2015 Shanghai Shenxin)
- Carlos Santos (2010 Shandong Taishan)
- Nei (2010–2011 Changchun Yatai)
- Márcio Senna (2010 Dalian Shide)
- Alexsandro (2010 Shanghai Shenxin)
- Gilcimar (2010 Liaoning)
- Davi (2011 Beijing Guoan)
- Roberto (2011 Beijing Guoan)
- Dori (2011 Changchun Yatai, 2014 Shaoxing Keqiao Yuejia)
- Muriqui (2011–2014, 2017 Guangzhou, 2020–2021 Cangzhou Mighty Lions)
- Cléo (2011–2012 Guangzhou, 2020 Qingdao)
- Paulão (2011–2012 Guangzhou)
- Renato Cajá (2011 Guangzhou)
- Fabão (2011 Henan)
- Tozin (2011 Shanghai Shenxin)
- Thiago Potiguar (2011 Henan)
- Rômulo (2011 Henan)
- Léo San (2011–2012 Qingdao Hainiu)
- Wilson (2011 Beijing Chengfeng)
- Renato Silva (2011 Shandong Taishan)
- Obina (2011–2012 Shandong Taishan)
- Adriano (2011–2012 Dalian Shide)
- di Carmo (2011 Shanghai Shenxin)
- Camilo (2011 Shanghai Shenxin)
- Paulo Roberto (2011 Shanghai Shenxin)
- Fabiano (2011–2012 Shandong Taishan)
- Reinaldo (2012 Beijing Guoan)
- Kassio (2012 Changchun Yatai)
- Weldon (2012 Changchun Yatai)
- Fábio Rochemback (2012–2013 Dalian Pro)
- Davi (2012–2014 Guangzhou City, 2015 Shanghai Port)
- Jumar (2012–2013 Guangzhou City)
- Leonardo (2012 Guangzhou City)
- Rafael Coelho (2012–2013 Guangzhou City, 2014 Changchun Yatai)
- Fabrício (2012 Zhejiang)
- Renatinho (2012 Zhejiang)
- Mazola (2012–2013 Zhejiang)
- Gilberto Macena (2012–2013 Shandong Taishan, 2014 Zhejiang)
- Moisés Moura (2012 Shanghai Shenhua)
- Anselmo (2012 Shanghai Shenxin)
- Antônio Flávio (2012–2013 Shanghai Shenxin)
- Jaílton Paraíba (2012–2014 Shanghai Shenxin)
- Adaílton (2012 Henan)
- Bruno Meneghel (2012–2013 Qingdao Hainiu, 2014 Dalian Pro, 2016–2017 Changchun Yatai)
- André Lima (2013 Beijing Guoan)
- Éder Baiano (2013 Changchun Yatai)
- Zé Carlos (2013 Changchun Yatai)
- Isac (2013 Changchun Yatai)
- Edu (2013 Liaoning)
- Gustavo (2013 Qingdao Hainiu)
- Kieza (2013–2014 Shanghai Shenxin)
- Éder Lima (2013–2014 Tianjin Jinmen Tiger)
- Dinélson (2013 Tianjin Jinmen Tiger)
- Júnior Santos (2013 Wuhan Yangtze River)
- Eninho (2013–2014 Changchun Yatai)
- Vágner Love (2013–2014 Shandong Taishan)
- Andrezinho (2013–2015 Tianjin Jinmen Tiger)
- Baré (2013–2014 Tianjin Jinmen Tiger)
- Renê Júnior (2014–2015 Guangzhou)
- Hyuri (2014–2015 Beijing Chengfeng, 2017 Chongqing Liangjiang Athletic)
- Anselmo Ramon (2014–2016 Zhejiang)
- Rodrigo Paulista (2014 Shaoxing Keqiao Yuejia)
- Rafael Marques (2014 Henan)
- Paulo André (2014 Shanghai Shenhua)
- Júnior Urso (2014–2015 Shandong Taishan, 2017–2018 Guangzhou City
- Elias (2014 Jiangsu)
- Paulo Henrique (2014–2015 Shanghai Shenhua, 2015 Liaoning)
- Everton (2014–2015 Shanghai Shenxin)
- Guto (2015 Chongqing Liangjiang Athletic)
- Ricardo Santos (2015 Beijing Chengfeng)
- Diego Tardelli (2015–2018 Shandong Taishan)
- Lucas Fonseca (2015 Tianjin Jinmen Tiger)
- Jajá (2015 Chongqing Liangjiang Athletic)
- Rodrigo Defendi (2015 Cangzhou Mighty Lions)
- Zé Eduardo (2015 Shanghai Shenxin)
- Ivo (2015–2016, 2018–2021 Henan, 2018 Beijing Chengfeng)
- Jael (2015–2016 Chongqing Liangjiang Athletic)
- Jucilei (2015–2016 Shandong Taishan)
- Paulinho (2015–2017, 2018–2020 Guangzhou)
- Wágner (2015–2016 Tianjin Jinmen Tiger)
- Renatinho (2015–2018, 2020 Guangzhou City, 2019 Tianjin Tianhai)
- Kléber (2015–2016 Beijing Guoan)
- Robinho (2015 Guangzhou)
- Bruninho (2016 Guangzhou City)
- Ralf (2016–2017 Beijing Guoan)
- Renato Augusto (2016–2021 Beijing Guoan)
- Gil (2016–2019 Shandong Taishan)
- Ramires (2016–2019 Jiangsu)
- Alex Teixeira (2016–2020 Jiangsu)
- Jô (2016 Jiangsu)
- Diego Maurício (2016 Cangzhou Mighty Lions)
- Denílson Gabionetta (2016 Zhejiang)
- Matheus (2016, 2020 Cangzhou Mighty Lions, 2022 Zhejiang)
- Hulk (2016–2020 Shanghai Port)
- Alan Kardec (2016–2020 Chongqing Liangjiang Athletic, 2021 Shenzhen)
- Geuvânio (2017 Tianjin Tianhai)
- Oscar (2017–2024 Shanghai Port)
- Marinho (2017–2018 Changchun Yatai)
- Alexandre Pato (2017–2018 Tianjin Tianhai)
- Hernanes (2017, 2018 Hebei)
- Fernandinho (2018–2021 Chongqing Liangjiang Athletic)
- Johnathan (2018–2020 Tianjin Jinmen Tiger, 2022 Chengdu Rongcheng)
- Talisca (2018–2020 Guangzhou)
- Sebá (2018 Chongqing Liangjiang Athletic)
- Fernando Karanga (2018, 2019–2023 Henan, 2025 Dalian Yingbo)
- Róger Guedes (2018–2019, 2020 Shandong Taishan)
- Rafael Silva (2019–2020, 2021 Wuhan Yangtze River)
- Léo Baptistão (2019–2021 Wuhan Yangtze River)
- Marcão (2019–2021 Hebei, 2022, 2023 Wuhan Three Towns)
- Henrique Dourado (2019, 2020–2022 Henan)
- Leonardo (2019 Tianjin Tianhai, 2020 Shandong Taishan)
- Moisés (2019–2023 Shandong Taishan)
- Marcinho (2019–2020 Chongqing Liangjiang Athletic)
- Miranda (2019–2020 Jiangsu)
- Fernando (2019–2020 Beijing Guoan)
- Paulinho (2020–2021 Hebei, 2021–2023 Shanghai Port)
- Rômulo (2020 Cangzhou Mighty Lions)
- Marcelo Cirino (2020 Chongqing Liangjiang Athletic)
- Ricardo Lopes (2020–2021 Shanghai Port)
- Sandro Lima (2020 Tianjin Jinmen Tiger)
- Tiquinho Soares (2020 Tianjin Jinmen Tiger)
- Jailson (2020–2021 Dalian Pro)
- Lucas Souza (2021 Beijing Guoan, 2021 Changchun Yatai)
- Erik (2021–2022 Changchun Yatai)
- Júnior Negrão (2021–2022 Changchun Yatai)
- Tiago Leonço (2021 Guangzhou City, 2024–2025 Shenzhen Peng City)
- Guilherme (2021–2022 Guangzhou City, 2024 Changchun Yatai)
- **Leonardo** (2021 Shandong Taishan, 2021 Hebei, 2023 Changchun Yatai, 2023–2024 Zhejiang, 2025– **Shanghai Port**)
- Magno Cruz (2021 Tianjin Jinmen Tiger)
- Anderson Lopes (2021 Wuhan Yangtze River)
- Jadson (2021–2024 Shandong Taishan)
- Anderson Silva (2021 Beijing Guoan)
- **Felipe** (2022– **Chengdu Rongcheng**)
- **Rômulo** (2022–2023, 2024– **Chengdu Rongcheng**)
- Rodrigo Henrique (2022–2025 Meizhou Hakka)
- **Cryzan** (2022– **Shandong Taishan**)
- Farley Rosa (2022–2023 Tianjin Jinmen Tiger, 2024 Nantong Zhiyun)
- Éder Lima (2022 Tianjin Jinmen Tiger)
- Ademilson (2022–2023 Wuhan Three Towns)
- **Davidson** (2022–2023 Wuhan Three Towns, 2025– **Qingdao West Coast**)
- Wallace (2022–2023 Wuhan Three Towns)
- Bruno Viana (2022 Wuhan Yangtze River)
- **Lucas Possignolo** (2022– **Zhejiang**)
- Matheus Saldanha (2022 Chengdu Rongcheng)
- Josef de Souza (2023 Beijing Guoan)
- Bressan (2023 Nantong Zhiyun)
- Lucas Morelatto (2023 Nantong Zhiyun)
- Andrigo (2023–2024 Chengdu Rongcheng)
- Matheus Pato (2023–2024 Shandong Taishan)
- Héber (2024 Cangzhou Mighty Lions)
- **Gustavo** (2024–2025 Shanghai Port, 2026– **Henan**)
- **Zeca** (2024– **Shandong Taishan**)
- **Matheus Jussa** (2024–2025 Shanghai Port, 2026– **Chengdu Rongcheng**)
- André Luis (2024–2025 Shanghai Shenhua)
- **Iago Maidana** (2024– **Henan**)
- **Bruno Nazário** (2024– **Henan**)
- Diego Lopes (2024 Qingdao Hainiu)
- Eduardo Henrique (2024 Qingdao West Coast)
- Léo Cittadini (2024 Shanghai Port)
- Thiago Andrade (2024 Shenzhen Peng City)
- Darlan (2024–2025 Wuhan Three Towns)
- Pedro Henrique (2024 Wuhan Three Towns, 2025 Yunnan Yukun)
- Matheus Índio (2024–2025 Qingdao West Coast)
- Marcel Scalese (2024 Shandong Taishan)
- Diogo Silva (2024 Tianjin Jinmen Tiger)
- **Dawhan** (2025– **Beijing Guoan**)
- **Felippe Cardoso** (2025 Henan, 2026– **Zhejiang**)
- **Lucas Maia** (2025– **Henan**)
- Filipe Augusto (2025 Qingdao Hainiu)
- **Wellington Silva** (2025 Qingdao Hainiu, 2026– **Chengdu Rongcheng**)
- Lucas Gazal (2025 Shandong Taishan)
- **Guilherme Madruga** (2025– **Shandong Taishan**)
- Gabrielzinho (2025–2026 Shanghai Port)
- **Mateus Vital** (2025– **Shanghai Port**)
- **Saulo Mineiro** (2025– **Shanghai Shenhua**)
- Riccieli (2025 Qingdao West Coast)
- **Gustavo Sauer** (2025– **Wuhan Three Towns**)
- **Wesley** (2025– **Shenzhen Peng City**)
- Yago Cariello (2025 Zhejiang)
- Daniel Penha (2025 Dalian Yingbo)
- **Lucão** (2026– **Chongqing Tonglianglong**)
- **Felipe** (2026– **Liaoning Tieren**)
- **Jeffinho** (2026– **Liaoning Tieren**)
- **Rezende** (2026– **Qingdao West Coast**)
- **Rafael Ratão** (2026– **Shanghai Shenhua**)
- **Guilherme Schettine** (2026– **Tianjin Jinmen Tiger**)
- **Adriano** (2026– **Wuhan Three Towns**)
- **Cléber** (2026– **Yunnan Yukun**)
- **Caio Vinícius** (2026– **Yunnan Yukun**)
- **Pedro Maranhão** (2026– **Henan**)
- **Gabriel Xavier** (2026– **Shenzhen Peng City**)

=== Chile ===
- Adán Vergara (2009 Dalian Shide)
- José Luis Villanueva (2010 Tianjin Jinmen Tiger)
- Gustavo Canales (2012 Dalian Pro)

=== Colombia ===
- Hamilton Ricard (2007–2008 Shanghai Shenhua)
- Ricardo Steer (2009–2010 Changchun Yatai, 2014 Shaoxing Keqiao Yuejia)
- Carlos Ceballos (2009 Jiangsu)
- Léiner Gómez (2009 Jiangsu)
- Duvier Riascos (2010–2011 Shanghai Shenhua, 2018 Dalian Pro)
- Juan Camilo Angulo (2011 Shanghai Shenhua)
- Yovanny Arrechea (2011 Changchun Yatai)
- Javier Estupiñán (2011 Chengdu Tiancheng)
- Eisner Loboa (2011 Shanghai Shenhua)
- John Mosquera (2012 Changchun Yatai)
- Edixon Perea (2012 Changchun Yatai)
- Giovanni Moreno (2012–2021 Shanghai Shenhua)
- Luis Carlos Cabezas (2013 Shanghai Port)
- Carmelo Valencia (2013–2014 Tianjin Jinmen Tiger)
- Luis Carlos Ruiz (2014 Shanghai Shenhua)
- Edison Toloza (2014 Jiangsu)
- Wilmar Jordán (2015 Tianjin Jinmen Tiger)
- Fredy Guarín (2016–2019 Shanghai Shenhua)
- Jackson Martínez (2016 Guangzhou)
- Fredy Montero (2016 Tianjin Jinmen Tiger)
- Roger Martínez (2016–2017 Jiangsu)
- Harold Preciado (2019–2020 Shenzhen)
- Jown Cardona (2021–2022 Guangzhou City)
- Juan Fernando Quintero (2021 Shenzhen)
- Manuel Palacios (2023–2024 Chengdu Rongcheng, 2025 Wuhan Three Towns)
- Brayan Riascos (2024 Qingdao West Coast)
- Danilo Arboleda (2024 Wuhan Three Towns)
- Juan Camilo Salazar (2025 Changchun Yatai)

=== Ecuador ===
- Ebelio Ordóñez (2005 Shanghai United)
- Joffre Guerrón (2012–2014 Beijing Guoan)
- Jaime Ayoví (2018 Beijing Chengfeng)
- Fidel Martínez (2020 Shanghai Shenhua)
- Miller Bolaños (2020–2022 Shanghai Shenhua, 2021 Chongqing Liangjiang Athletic)

=== Paraguay ===
- Justo Meza (2008 Shanghai Shenhua)
- Michael Valenzuela (2008 Shenzhen)
- Lucas Barrios (2012–2013 Guangzhou)
- José Ortigoza (2012 Shandong Taishan)
- Óscar Romero (2018–2019 Shanghai Shenhua)

=== Peru ===
- Aldo Olcese (2005 Guangzhou City)
- Ismael Alvarado (2008–2009 Guangzhou)
- Paolo de la Haza (2011 Jiangsu)
- Santiago Ormeño (2025 Qingdao Hainiu)

=== Uruguay ===
- Peter Vera (2004 Shanghai Shenhua)
- Heberley Sosa (2004 Qingdao Hainiu)
- Fernando Correa (2007 Shanghai Shenhua)
- Diego Alonso (2007 Shanghai Shenhua)
- Sergio Blanco (2007 Shanghai Shenhua)
- Juan Manuel Olivera (2007 Beijing Chengfeng)
- Pablo Munhoz (2008 Wuhan Optics Valley)
- Edgar Martínez (2009 Chongqing Liangjiang Athletic)
- Matías Masiero (2011 Zhejiang)
- Paulo Pezzolano (2011 Zhejiang)
- Sebastián Vázquez (2011 Zhejiang)
- Jonathan Ramis (2011 Shanghai Shenxin)
- Diego Vera (2011 Shanghai Shenxin)

=== Venezuela ===
- Alejandro Cichero (2008–2009 Shandong Taishan)
- Mario Rondón (2015–2016 Cangzhou Mighty Lions)
- Salomón Rondón (2019–2020 Dalian Pro)
- **Jhonder Cádiz** (2026– **Wuhan Three Towns**)
- Saúl Guarirapa (2026 Zhejiang)

== See also ==
- Chinese Super League

== Notes ==
1. Born in Angola
2. Born in Argentina
3. Born in Australia
4. Born in Belgium
5. Born in Brazil
6. Born in China
7. Born in Ivory Coast
8. Born in Cameroon
9. Born in Colombia
10. Born in Croatia
11. Born in Croatia – then part of Yugoslavia
12. Born in Democratic Republic of the Congo
13. Born in England
14. Born in Spain
15. Born in France
16. Born in Ghana
17. Born in Guadeloupe
18. Born in Greece
19. Born in Japan
20. Born in Kosovo – then part of Yugoslavia
21. Born in Lebanon
22. Born in Mexico
23. Born in North Macedonia – then part of Yugoslavia
24. Born in Netherlands
25. Born in Nigeria
26. Born in Portugal
27. Born in Sierra Leone
28. Born in Serbia – then part of Yugoslavia
29. Born in Slovenia – then part of Yugoslavia
30. Born in Sweden
31. Born in United Arab Emirates
32. Born in United States
33. Born in Yugoslavia
34. Born in Zaire
35. Capped for China
36. Capped for Croatia
37. Capped for Greece
38. Capped for Portugal
39. Capped for Sweden
