= 2008 Chinese Super League =

Chinese Super League
- Season: 2008
- Champions: Shandong Luneng
- Relegated: Liaoning Whowin
- AFC Champions League: Shandong Luneng; Shanghai Shenhua; Beijing Guoan; Tianjin TEDA
- Top goalscorer: Éber (14 goals)
- Biggest home win: Changchun Yatai 6–0 Guangzhou Pharmaceutical (Oct 11)
- Biggest away win: Changsha Ginde 1–5 Qingdao Jonoon (Oct 11)
- Highest scoring: Liaoning Whowin 4–4 Shanghai Shenhua (Nov 12); Tianjin TEDA 5–3 Dalian Shide (Nov 30)
- Average attendance: 13,444

The 2008 Chinese Super League (known as the Kingway 2008 Chinese Super League for sponsorship reasons) was the fifth season since the establishment of the Chinese Super League and the 15th season of the professional football league in China. This season was the first which featured 16 clubs. Shandong Luneng won their third title at the end of this season.

== Teams ==
=== Team changes ===
- At the end of the 2007 season, Guangzhou Pharmaceutical and Chengdu Blades were promoted to Super League.
- At the end of the 2007 season, Xiamen Lanshi were relegated to League One.
- Wuhan Optics Valley withdrew from the league and folded.
- At the end of the season, Liaoning Whowin were relegated to League One.

=== Stadiums ===
Map of Super League Clubs 2008

Team	Stadium	Capacity	Average attendance
Beijing Guoan	Beijing Fengtai Stadium	31,000	14,641
Changchun Yatai	Changchun Stadium	41,638	5,797
Changsha Ginde	Helong Sports Center Stadium	55,000	6,645
Chengdu Blades	Chengdu Sports Centre	42,000	12,378
Dalian Shide	Jinzhou Stadium	30,000	7,900
Guangzhou Pharmaceutical	Yuexiushan Stadium	22,000	19,624
Henan Construction	Hanghai Stadium	30,000	16,267
Liaoning Whowin	Tiexi New District Sports Center	26,800	11,733
Qingdao Jonoon	Qingdao Tiantai Stadium	30,000	6,600
Shaanxi Chanba	Shaanxi Province Stadium	57,000	24,625
Shandong Luneng	Shandong Provincial Stadium	43,700	26,501
Shanghai Shenhua	Hongkou Football Stadium	35,000	11,510
Shenzhen Xiangxue	Shenzhen Stadium	32,500	6,400
Tianjin TEDA	TEDA Soccer Stadium	37,500	14,007
Wuhan Optics Valley	Xinhua Road Sports Center	36,000	12,556
Zhejiang Greentown	Huanglong Sports Center	51,000	12,188
**Total**			**13,444**

=== Managers ===
Team	Manager	2nd Manager	3rd Manager
Beijing Guoan	(South Korea) Lee Jang-soo		
Changchun Yatai	(China) Gao Hongbo (Sacked after round 10)	(Germany) Ernst Middendorp (Resigned after round 24)	(China) Li Shubin
Changsha Ginde	(Serbia) Slobodan Santrač (Sacked after round 9)	(China) Zhu Bo	
Chengdu Blades	(China) Li Bing		
Dalian Shide	(Serbia) Ratko Dostanić (Sacked after round 8)	(Serbia) Milorad Kosanović	
Guangzhou Pharmaceutical	(China) Shen Xiangfu		
Henan Construction	(China) Jia Xiuquan (Resigned after round 8)	(Portugal) Acácio Casimiro (Sacked after round 16)	(China) Tang Yaodong
Liaoning Whowin	(Germany) Werner Lorant (Sacked after round 10)	(China) Ma Lin	
Qingdao Jonoon	(China) Guo Kanfeng		
Shaanxi Chanba	(China) Cheng Yaodong		
Shandong Luneng	(Serbia) Ljubiša Tumbaković		
Shanghai Shenhua	(China) Wu Jingui (Sacked after round 14)	(China) Jia Xiuquan	
Shenzhen Xiangxue	(China) Mai Chao (Resigned after round 1)	(China) Zhang Zengqun (Sacked after round 13)	(China) Wang Baoshan
Tianjin TEDA	(Czech Republic) Jozef Jarabinský (Sacked after round 7)	(China) Zuo Shusheng	
Wuhan Optics Valley	(China) Chen Fangping (Sacked after round 4)	(China) Zhu Guanghu	
Zhejiang Greentown	(China) Sun Wei (Sacked after round 4)	(China) Zhou Sui'an	

=== Foreign players ===
The number of foreign players is restricted to four, but all teams can only use three foreign players on the field in each game. Players from Hong Kong, Macau and Chinese Taipei are deemed to be native players in CSL.

- Players name in **bold** indicates the player is registered during the mid-season transfer window.
- Players in italics were out of the squad or left the club within the season, after the pre-season transfer window, or in the mid-season transfer window, and at least had one appearance.

Club	Player 1	Player 2	Player 3	Player 4	Former players
Beijing Guoan	(Brazil) Tiago	(Honduras) **Elvis Scott**	(Honduras) Walter Martínez	(Romania) **Ovidiu Burcă**	(North Macedonia) Stojan Ignatov
Changchun Yatai	(Honduras) Samuel Caballero	(Ivory Coast) Guillaume Dah Zadi	(Nigeria) Gabriel Melkam	(Romania) Dumitru Mitu	
Changsha Ginde	(Albania) Nevil Dede	(Brazil) Sandro	(Brazil) **Tales**	(Cameroon) Aboubakar Oumarou	(Serbia) Milan Nikolić
Chengdu Blades	(Brazil) Auricélio Neres	(Brazil) **Denílson Souza**	(Jamaica) Demar Stewart	(North Korea) Kim Yong-jun	(Brazil) Luiz Rodrigues (Croatia) Igor Tkalčević (Ivory Coast) Sékou Tidiane Souaré
Dalian Shide	(Bulgaria) Georgi Chilikov	(Serbia) **Dragan Vukmir**	(Zambia) James Chamanga		(Bulgaria) Kaloyan Karadzhinov (Cameroon) Patrick Mevoungou (Croatia) Vedran Celiščak
Guangzhou Pharmaceutical	(Brazil) Diego Barcelos	(Brazil) **José Duarte**	(Honduras) Luis Ramírez	(Peru) Ismael Alvarado	
Henan Construction	(Brazil) **Douglas**	(Brazil) Gilsinho	(Nigeria) Obi Emmanuel Moneke	(Poland) Emmanuel Olisadebe	(Bulgaria) Ivo Trenchev (Nigeria) Eric Obinna Chukwunyelu
Liaoning Whowin	(Australia) Ryan Griffiths	(Belarus) **Raman Kirenkin**	(Democratic Republic of the Congo) **Delain Sasa**		(Brazil) Jefferson Feijão (Brazil) Zé Roberto
Qingdao Jonoon	(Cameroon) Jean-Paul Ndeki	(Honduras) **Mitchel Brown**	(Serbia) Dragan Stančić	(South Korea) Lee Jae-won	(Honduras) Luis Santamaría
Shaanxi Chanba	(Brazil) Ronny	(Brazil) Rafael Scheidt	(Brazil) Vicente	(Nigeria) **Innocent Melkam**	
Shandong Luneng	(Brazil) Luciano Ratinho	(Serbia) Aleksandar Živković	(Serbia) **Miljan Mrdaković**	(Venezuela) **Alejandro Cichero**	
Shanghai Shenhua	(Colombia) Hámilton Ricard	(Costa Rica) Erick Scott	(Honduras) Emil Martínez	(Honduras) **José Güity**	(Argentina) Matías Marchesini (Paraguay) **Justo Meza**
Shenzhen Xiangxue	(Angola) Johnson Macaba	(Brazil) **Felipe Menegon**	(Paraguay) Michael Valenzuela	(Poland) Marek Zając	(Brazil) Edson
Tianjin TEDA	(Brazil) Éber	(Croatia) Darko Matić	(Ivory Coast) **Mariko Daouda**	(Romania) Marius Radu	(Brazil) Jonhes
Wuhan Optics Valley					(Argentina) César La Paglia (Brazil) Danilo (Brazil) Everson (Brazil) Gustavo Papa (Uruguay) Pablo Munhoz
Zhejiang Greentown	(Algeria) Karim Benounes	(Brazil) Valdo	(Bulgaria) Yordan Varbanov	(Egypt) **Mohsen Abo Gresha**	(North Macedonia) Slavčo Georgievski

Hong Kong/Chinese Taipei/Macau players (doesn't count on the foreign player slot)

Club	Player 1
Shanghai Shenhua	(Hong Kong) Ng Wai Chiu

== Final league table ==
Pos	Team	Pld	W	D	L	GF	GA	GD	Pts	Qualification or relegation
1	Shandong Luneng (C)	30	18	9	3	54	25	+29	63	2009 AFC Champions League Group stage
2	Shanghai Shenhua	30	17	10	3	58	29	+29	61	2009 AFC Champions League Group stage
3	Beijing Guoan	30	16	10	4	44	27	+17	58	2009 AFC Champions League Group stage
4	Tianjin TEDA	30	16	9	5	54	29	+25	57	2009 AFC Champions League Group stage
5	Shaanxi Chanba	30	15	7	8	41	29	+12	52	
6	Changchun Yatai	30	12	9	9	53	45	+8	45	
7	Guangzhou Pharmaceutical	30	10	10	10	41	42	−1	40	
8	Qingdao Jonoon	30	10	9	11	39	36	+3	39 (Note: Qingdao: 6 pts, 4–1; Zhejiang: 0 pts, 1–4)	
9	Zhejiang Greentown	30	9	12	9	38	32	+6	39	
10	Henan Construction	30	9	9	12	30	31	−1	36	
11	Changsha Ginde	30	7	13	10	28	36	−8	34	
12	Shenzhen Xiangxue	30	8	9	13	35	34	+1	33	
13	Chengdu Blades	30	7	11	12	30	37	−7	32	
14	Dalian Shide	30	6	12	12	30	40	−10	30	
15	Liaoning Whowin (R)	30	6	9	15	34	47	−13	27	Relegated to China League One
16	Wuhan Optics Valley	30	0	0	30	0	90	−90	0 (Note: Wuhan Optics Valley withdrew from the league and folded; all of their matches were scratched and counted as 3–0 wins to their opponents.)	Withdrew from the league and folded

Updated to match(es) played on November 30, 2008. Source: CSL
Rules for classification: 1) points; 2) head-to-head points; 3) head-to-head goal difference; 4) head-to-head goals scored; 5) goal difference; 6) number of goals scored.
(C) Champions; (R) Relegated

=== Results table ===
Home \ Away	BJ	CC	CS	CD	DL	GZ	HN	LN	QD	PD	SD	SH	SZ	TJ	WH	ZJ
Beijing Guoan		2–1	1–0	2–0	2–1	3–2	2–0	2–0	1–0	1–1	1–1	0–2	1–0	2–2	3–0	1–0
Changchun Yatai	1–1		0–0	2–1	2–0	6–0	0–0	0–0	3–1	1–0	2–2	2–2	4–2	0–2	3–0	2–2
Changsha Ginde	1–1	2–2		1–1	0–0	4–2	0–0	1–0	1–5	1–1	0–1	1–1	2–1	1–3	3–0	1–1
Chengdu Blades	1–1	1–2	0–1		2–1	1–1	0–0	1–1	1–1	0–1	2–4	2–1	3–1	0–2	3–0	2–2
Dalian Shide	3–1	2–3	1–1	1–2		1–1	1–1	2–1	1–0	1–1	0–0	0–0	2–1	1–1	3–0	0–0
Guangzhou Pharmaceutical	1–1	3–2	0–0	1–1	3–0		4–2	1–2	3–2	0–1	1–0	0–1	1–0	4–3	3–0	1–3
Henan Construction	1–2	2–0	0–1	0–0	3–0	2–0		3–3	2–0	1–0	0–2	0–2	2–1	1–1	3–0	1–0
Liaoning Whowin	1–2	3–0	1–0	0–0	0–0	0–2	0–0		3–2	1–2	2–4	4–4	1–2	1–2	3–0	0–1
Qingdao Jonoon	1–2	2–2	1–1	1–0	2–1	0–0	0–0	2–1		1–3	1–1	0–0	1–0	0–1	3–0	2–1
Shaanxi Chanba	2–1	4–3	2–1	3–0	2–0	1–1	2–1	3–0	0–2		0–2	1–4	1–0	1–0	3–0	2–2
Shandong Luneng	2–0	3–1	4–1	2–1	2–0	0–0	1–0	3–1	2–1	0–0		2–1	2–1	1–1	3–0	2–1
Shanghai Shenhua	1–1	3–2	2–0	2–0	3–1	3–2	2–0	1–1	4–1	2–0	3–2		2–0	2–1	3–0	2–2
Shenzhen Xiangxue	0–0	1–2	0–0	0–0	0–0	1–1	3–1	4–0	1–1	0–0	3–2	2–0		1–1	3–0	0–1
Tianjin TEDA	1–3	1–2	2–0	3–1	5–3	2–0	2–1	2–0	1–1	1–0	1–1	1–1	1–1		3–0	4–0
Wuhan Optics Valley	0–3	0–3	0–3	0–3	0–3	0–3	0–3	0–3	0–3	0–3	0–3	0–3	0–3	0–3		0–3
Zhejiang Greentown	1–1	3–0	3–0	0–1	1–1	0–0	2–0	1–1	0–2	2–1	0–0	1–1	2–3	0–1	3–0	

Source: CSL
Legend: Blue = home team win; Yellow = draw; Red = away team win.

== Top scorers ==
Rank	Scorer	Club	Goals
1	(Brazil) Éber	Tianjin TEDA	14
2	(Angola) Johnson Macaba	Shenzhen Xiangxue	13
3	(Honduras) Luis Ramírez	Guangzhou Pharmaceutical	12
3	(Poland) Emmanuel Olisadebe	Henan Construction	12
5	(Brazil) Valdo	Zhejiang Greentown	10
5	(China) Du Zhenyu	Changchun Yatai	10
7	(China) Cao Tianbao	Changchun Yatai	9
7	(Colombia) Hámilton Ricard	Shanghai Shenhua	9
7	(Ivory Coast) Guillaume Dah Zadi	Changchun Yatai	9
10	(Brazil) Vicente	Shaanxi Chanba	8
10	(China) Gao Lin	Shanghai Shenhua	8
10	(China) Han Peng	Shandong Luneng	8
10	(Honduras) Emil Martínez	Shanghai Shenhua	8
10	(Serbia) Miljan Mrdaković	Shandong Luneng	8

== See also ==
- 2008 China League One
- 2008 China League Two
