= 2010 Chinese Super League =

Chinese Super League
- Season: 2010
- Champions: Shandong Luneng
- Relegated: Chongqing Lifan; Changsha Ginde
- Champions League: Shandong Luneng; Tianjin TEDA; Shanghai Shenhua; Hangzhou Greentown
- Matches: 240
- Goals: 581 (2.42 per match)
- Top goalscorer: Duvier Riascos (20 goals)
- Biggest home win: Shaanxi 5–0 Changsha
- Biggest away win: Shenzhen 0–4 Shanghai
- Highest scoring: Shenzhen 4–4 Liaoning

The 2010 Chinese Super League season (also known as Pirelli Chinese Super League for sponsorship reasons) was the seventh season since the establishment of the Chinese Super League, the seventeenth season of a professional association football league and the 49th top-tier league season in China.

The teams ranked first through fourteenth of the previous season and two promoted teams from the 2009 League One season participated in this season. Shandong Luneng won the title for third time in seven years.

== Promotion and relegation ==
Teams promoted from 2009 China League One

- Liaoning Whowin
- Nanchang Hengyuan

Teams relegated to 2010 China League One

- Chengdu Blades
- Guangzhou GPC

== Clubs ==
=== Teams & locations ===
- P – Promoted, TH – Title Holders

Club	Chinese	City	Home stadium	Capacity	Average attendance
Beijing Guoan^{TH}	北京国安	Beijing	Workers' Stadium	62,000	33,342
Changchun Yatai	长春亚泰	Changchun	Development Area Stadium	25,000	10,067
Changsha Ginde	长沙金德	Changsha	Helong Stadium	55,000	10,152
Chongqing Lifan	重庆力帆	Chongqing	Chongqing Olympic Sports Center	58,680	11,433
Dalian Shide	大连实德	Dalian	Jinzhou Stadium	30,775	12,307
Hangzhou Greentown	杭州绿城	Hangzhou	Huanglong Sports Center	51,139	14,550
Henan Jianye	河南建业	Zhengzhou	Hanghai Stadium	29,000	18,630
Jiangsu Sainty	江苏舜天	Nanjing	Nanjing Olympic Sports Center	61,443	10,667
Liaoning Whowin^{P}	辽宁宏运	Shenyang	Tiexi New District Sports Center	24,000	10,100
Nanchang Hengyuan^{P}	南昌衡源	Nanchang	Nanchang Bayi Stadium	20,000	11,680
Qingdao Jonoon	青岛中能	Qingdao	Qingdao Tiantai Stadium	20,525	6,247
Shaanxi Chanba	陕西浐灞	Xi'an	Shaanxi Province Stadium	47,565	28,053
Shandong Luneng	山东鲁能	Jinan	Shandong Provincial Stadium	43,700	15,901
Shanghai Shenhua	上海申花	Shanghai	Hongkou Football Stadium	33,060	12,963
Shenzhen Ruby	深圳红钻	Shenzhen	Shenzhen Stadium	32,500	12,439
Tianjin TEDA	天津泰达	Tianjin	TEDA Soccer Stadium	36,390	14,757
**Total**					**14,581**

Location of teams in 2010 Chinese Super League

=== Personnel ===
Team	Manager
Beijing Guoan	(China) Wei Kexing
Changchun Yatai	(China) Shen Xiangfu
Changsha Ginde	(Serbia) Miodrag Ješić
Chongqing Lifan	(China) Wei Xin (caretaker)
Dalian Shide	(South Korea) Park Sung-hwa
Hangzhou Greentown	(China) Wu Jingui
Henan Jianye	(China) Tang Yaodong
Jiangsu Sainty	(China) Pei Encai
Liaoning Whowin	(China) Ma Lin
Nanchang Hengyuan	(China) Zhu Jiong
Qingdao Jonoon	(Serbia) Dragan Jovanović
Shaanxi Chanba	(Serbia) Milorad Kosanović
Shandong Luneng	(Croatia) Branko Ivanković
Shanghai Shenhua	(Croatia) Miroslav Blažević
Shenzhen Ruby	(Cyprus) Siniša Gogić
Tianjin TEDA	(Netherlands) Arie Haan

=== Managerial changes ===
Club	Outgoing	Manner	Date	Incoming
Tianjin TEDA	(China) Zuo Shusheng	Sacked	End of 2009 season	(Netherlands) Arie Haan
Shanghai Shenhua	(China) Jia Xiuquan	Sacked	End of 2009 season	(Croatia) Miroslav Blažević
Changchun Yatai	(China) Li Shubin	Sacked	End of 2009 season	(China) Shen Xiangfu
Shandong Luneng	(Serbia) Ljubiša Tumbaković	Sacked	End of 2009 season	(Croatia) Branko Ivanković
Chongqing Lifan	(Netherlands) Arie Haan	End of contract	End of 2009 season	(China) Li Shubin
Qingdao Jonoon	(Serbia) Slobodan Santrač	Sacked	End of 2009 season	(Serbia) Dragan Jovanović
Shenzhen Ruby	(China) Xie Feng	Sacked	End of 2009 season	(Cyprus) Siniša Gogić
Shaanxi Chanba	(China) Zhu Guanghu	Resigned	May 8, 2010	(Serbia) Milorad Kosanović
Dalian Shide	(China) Xu Hong	Resigned	May 15, 2010	(China) Liu Zhongchang (caretaker)
Changsha Ginde	(China) Hao Wei	Resigned	June 16, 2010	(Serbia) Miodrag Ješić
Dalian Shide	(China) Liu Zhongchang (caretaker)	End of caretaker spell	June 19, 2010	(South Korea) Park Sung-hwa
Chongqing Lifan	(China) Li Shubin	Sacked	July 19, 2010	(China) Wei Xin (caretaker)
Beijing Guoan	(China) Hong Yuanshuo	Sacked	September 21, 2010	(China) Wei Kexing

=== Foreign players ===
The number of foreign players is restricted to five per CSL team, including a slot for a player from AFC countries. A team can use four foreign players on the field in each game, including at least one player from the AFC country. Players from Hong Kong, Macau and Chinese Taipei are deemed to be native players in CSL.

- Players name in **bold** indicates the player is registered during the mid-season transfer window.
- Players in italics were out of the squad or left the club within the season, after the pre-season transfer window, or in the mid-season transfer window, and at least had one appearance.

Club	Player 1	Player 2	Player 3	Player 4	AFC player	Former players
Beijing Guoan	(Australia) Joel Griffiths	(Croatia) Darko Matić	(Honduras) **Walter Martinez**	(Scotland) Maurice Ross	(Australia) Ryan Griffiths	(Brazil) Valdo
Changchun Yatai	(Argentina) Sebastián Setti	(Brazil) **Nei**	(Colombia) Ricardo Steer	(Serbia) **Miloš Mihajlov**	(South Korea) Lee Se-in	(Costa Rica) Johnny Woodly (Honduras) Samuel Caballero
Changsha Ginde	(Brazil) Sandro	(Croatia) Frane Čačić	(Nigeria) Akanni-Sunday Wasiu	(Serbia) **Nenad Mladenović**	(South Korea) Woo Joo-young	(Democratic Republic of the Congo) M'peti Nimba
Chongqing Lifan	(Brazil) José Duarte	(Costa Rica) **Johnny Woodly**	(Croatia) **Bruno Šiklić**	(Ivory Coast) Mariko Daouda	(South Korea) Cho Se-kwon	(Montenegro) Petar Bojović (Serbia) Dušan Đokić (Uganda) Andrew Mwesigwa
Dalian Shide	(Brazil) **Márcio Senna**	(Bulgaria) **Martin Kamburov**	(Serbia) Borko Veselinović	(Zambia) James Chamanga	(South Korea) Ahn Jung-hwan	(Costa Rica) José Luis López (Costa Rica) Porfirio López
Hangzhou Greentown	(Honduras) Emil Martínez	(Honduras) Jerry Palacios	(Honduras) Luis Ramírez	(Honduras) Mauricio Sabillón	(Australia) Adam Griffiths	
Henan Jianye	(Brazil) Leandro Netto	(Nigeria) Obi Emmanuel Moneke	(Poland) Emmanuel Olisadebe		(South Korea) Song Tae-lim	(Senegal) Amado Diallo (Serbia) Goran Gavrančić (Serbia) Miloš Bajalica
Jiangsu Sainty	(Brazil) Eleílson	(Brazil) Geninho	(Nigeria) **Victor Agali**	(Sierra Leone) **Aluspah Brewah**	(South Korea) Park Jae-hong	(Brazil) Éber (Brazil) Pedro Henrique
Liaoning Whowin	(Australia) Chris Coyne	(Brazil) Andrezinho	(Brazil) **Gilcimar**	(Mali) Boubacar Diarra	(Uzbekistan) **Islom Inomov**	(Brazil) Felipe Conceição
Nanchang Hengyuan	(Brazil) **Alexsandro**	(Brazil) Beto	(Brazil) Johnny		(Uzbekistan) **Asqar Jadigerov**	(Brazil) Alex (Syria) Adel Abdullah (Trinidad and Tobago) Kevaughn Connell
Qingdao Jonoon	(Bosnia and Herzegovina) **Ninoslav Milenković**	(Croatia) Stjepan Jukić	(Serbia) Ivan Vukomanović	(Slovenia) Aleksandar Rodić	(South Korea) Lee Yoon-sub	(Slovenia) Tomislav Mišura (South Korea) Lee Jae-won (South Korea) Lee Son-ming
Shaanxi Chanba	(Croatia) **Ivan Brečević**	(France) Cédric Sabin	(Serbia) **Miloš Bajalica**	(Sierra Leone) Mohamed Kallon	(Ivory Coast) Jonas Salley^{1}	(Brazil) Célio Santos (United States) Lyle Martin
Shandong Luneng	(Brazil) Carlos	(France) **Michaël Murcy**	(Honduras) **Julio César de León**	(Mali) **Mourtala Diakité**	(Lebanon) Roda Antar	(Netherlands) Fred Benson (Serbia) Siniša Radanović
Shanghai Shenhua	(Argentina) **Matías Villavicencio**	(Brazil) Vicente	(Cameroon) Jean Michel N'Lend	(Colombia) Duvier Riascos	(Syria) Ali Diab	(Brazil) Adelardo (Spain) Roberto Batres
Shenzhen Ruby	(Belarus) Vyacheslav Hleb	(New Zealand) **Chris Killen**	(New Zealand) **Ivan Vicelich**	(Serbia) Aleksandar Živković	(Iraq) Hussein Alaa Hussein	(Brazil) Tiago (Bulgaria) Yanko Valkanov
Tianjin Teda	(Argentina) **Luciano Olguín**	(Chile) **José Luis Villanueva**	(Costa Rica) Rodolfo Rodríguez	(Serbia) Marko Zorić	(Uzbekistan) Aleksandr Kletskov	(Nigeria) Alfred Emuejeraye (Uzbekistan) Farhod Tadjiyev

Hong Kong/Chinese Taipei/Macau players (doesn't count on the foreign player slot)

Club	Player 1
Hangzhou Greentown	(Hong Kong) Ng Wai Chiu
Shenzhen Ruby	(Hong Kong) Andy Nägelein

- **^1** Jonas Salley owns Australian citizenship and was counted as an Asian player in the Chinese Super League.

== Match-fixing scandal ==
In China's attempts to revitalise the domestic game, which has been dogged with allegations of corruption over the last few years they questioned or arrested several high-profile members within Chinese football. The most high profile of these were the former Head of the Chinese Football Association Nan Yong, his deputy Yang Yimin and Zhang Jianqiang who used to be in charge of referee arrangements. The crackdown quickly discovered that Guangzhou GPC and Chengdu Blades had both bribed their way into the top tier. Both were relegated to the second tier and did not appeal, making their punishment the harshest dealt out to a club. In keeping the top table at 16 teams, Hangzhou Greentown and Chongqing Lifan both retained their places within the top tier despite being originally slated for relegation.

== League table ==
Pos	Team	Pld	W	D	L	GF	GA	GD	Pts	Qualification or relegation
1	Shandong Luneng (C)	30	18	9	3	59	34	+25	63	AFC Champions League Group stage
2	Tianjin TEDA	30	13	11	6	37	29	+8	50	AFC Champions League Group stage
3	Shanghai Shenhua	30	14	6	10	44	41	+3	48 (Note: Shanghai: 4 pts, 3–2; Hangzhou: 1 pt, 2–3)	AFC Champions League Group stage
4	Hangzhou Greentown	30	13	9	8	38	30	+8	48	AFC Champions League Group stage
5	Beijing Guoan	30	12	10	8	35	29	+6	46	
6	Dalian Shide	30	10	12	8	40	37	+3	42	
7	Liaoning Whowin	30	10	10	10	39	36	+3	40 (Note: Liaoning: 4 pts, 3–1; Henan: 1 pt, 1–3)	
8	Henan Jianye	30	9	13	8	31	31	0	40	
9	Changchun Yatai	30	10	8	12	40	41	−1	38	
10	Shaanxi Chanba	30	9	10	11	33	36	−3	37	
11	Jiangsu Sainty	30	8	11	11	27	27	0	35	
12	Shenzhen Ruby	30	8	8	14	34	41	−7	32 (Note: Shenzhen: 6 pts, 2–0; Nanchang: 0 pt, 0–2)	
13	Nanchang Hengyuan	30	8	8	14	33	35	−2	32	
14	Qingdao Jonoon	30	6	12	12	31	44	−13	30 (Note: Qingdao: 8 pts, 7–4; Chongqing: 5 pts, 6–5; Changsha: 2 pts, 4–8)	
15	Chongqing Lifan (R)	30	7	9	14	36	48	−12	30	Relegation to China League One
16	Changsha Ginde (R)	30	6	12	12	24	42	−18	30	Relegation to China League One

Rules for classification: 1st points; 2nd head-to-head points; 3rd head-to-head goal difference; 4th head-to-head goals scored; 5th goal difference; 6th goals scored; 7th disciplinary points (1 point for each yellow card, 3 points for each red card). Head-to-Head: used when head-to-head record is used to rank tied teams.
(C) Champions; (R) Relegated

== Positions by round ==
Team ╲ Round	1	2	3	4	5	6	7	8	9	10	11	12	13	14	15	16	17	18	19	20	21	22	23	24	25	26	27	28	29	30
Shandong Luneng	1	3	1	4	1	1	2	1	2	2	3	2	2	2	1	2	1	1	1	1	1	1	1	1	1	1	1	1	1	1
Tianjin TEDA	7	9	10	13	14	15	15	12	5	10	11	7	9	11	7	6	6	5	6	7	5	3	4	3	3	3	3	3	3	2
Shanghai Shenhua	16	8	5	3	4	2	1	2	1	1	1	1	1	1	2	1	2	2	2	2	2	2	2	2	2	2	2	2	2	3
Hangzhou Greentown	13	14	14	16	16	16	10	13	8	6	4	3	3	4	4	3	3	4	4	5	4	6	3	4	6	6	5	4	4	4
Beijing Guoan	3	7	4	2	3	4	4	3	6	9	9	4	6	6	5	4	4	3	3	3	3	5	8	5	4	4	6	5	5	5
Dalian Shide	5	11	11	9	6	9	13	15	12	11	14	13	11	12	9	9	7	6	7	8	10	7	6	6	5	5	4	6	6	6
Liaoning Whowin	10	2	2	5	5	6	9	4	7	3	2	5	4	5	6	5	5	6	5	4	6	4	5	7	7	8	7	8	8	7
Henan Jianye	4	5	8	7	8	7	6	5	3	4	5	6	5	3	3	7	7	8	10	10	8	9	7	8	8	9	8	7	7	8
Changchun Yatai	9	1	7	11	13	10	12	10	11	5	7	10	7	7	11	13	11	12	11	12	12	11	11	11	10	10	10	11	10	9
Shaanxi Renhe	6	12	12	15	12	14	16	16	14	8	10	8	8	9	10	10	9	10	12	9	7	8	9	9	9	7	9	9	9	10
Jiangsu Sainty	12	13	13	12	15	13	14	14	16	15	8	11	13	8	12	11	12	11	8	6	9	10	10	10	11	11	11	10	11	11
Shenzhen Ruby	11	6	3	1	2	3	3	6	4	7	12	12	10	10	8	8	10	9	9	11	11	13	14	14	15	14	15	12	12	12
Nanchang Hengyuan	15	16	16	14	9	8	5	8	13	13	6	9	12	13	16	16	14	14	14	13	14	15	16	16	16	13	16	16	13	13
Qingdao Jonoon	8	10	9	8	10	12	8	11	15	16	16	16	14	15	13	14	15	15	15	16	16	12	13	13	13	15	12	13	14	14
Chongqing Lifan	14	15	15	10	7	11	11	7	9	12	15	15	16	14	14	12	13	13	13	15	15	16	15	15	14	16	13	15	15	15
Changsha Ginde	2	4	6	6	11	5	7	9	10	14	13	14	15	16	15	15	16	16	16	14	13	14	12	12	12	12	14	14	16	16

Leader and qualification to AFC Champions League Group stage
Qualification to AFC Champions League Group stage
Relegation to League One

Source: Results by round

== Results ==
Home \ Away	BJ	CC	CS	CQ	DL	HZ	HN	JS	LN	NC	QD	SX	SD	SH	SZ	TJ
Beijing Guoan		2–1	0–0	1–0	2–1	0–2	2–2	1–0	3–0	2–0	1–1	1–0	2–3	4–1	1–2	1–1
Changchun Yatai	0–1		3–0	1–2	3–2	3–4	0–0	1–0	0–0	1–2	2–0	2–0	1–1	3–1	2–1	1–1
Changsha Ginde	1–0	2–2		2–2	2–3	1–1	1–2	0–0	1–0	2–1	0–2	1–1	0–2	2–0	0–0	0–0
Chongqing Lifan	2–1	1–1	2–0		1–3	0–1	1–0	2–3	1–1	3–2	1–1	2–2	1–2	0–1	0–2	1–2
Dalian Shide	3–0	2–1	0–1	2–2		2–1	0–0	1–0	0–2	2–1	3–2	2–2	2–2	0–2	0–0	1–2
Hangzhou Greentown	1–2	1–1	1–1	0–0	1–0		2–0	2–1	2–1	1–1	1–2	2–0	2–1	1–1	2–1	0–0
Henan Jianye	1–1	3–2	2–0	2–0	0–1	1–0		0–2	0–2	1–0	2–2	1–0	1–1	2–1	1–0	0–1
Jiangsu Sainty	0–1	1–2	0–0	3–0	0–0	1–1	0–0		1–0	0–2	4–0	1–0	3–3	1–1	0–0	1–0
Liaoning Whowin	2–2	5–1	0–1	1–0	1–1	1–0	1–1	2–1		1–0	3–3	2–1	4–1	1–0	1–2	1–3
Nanchang Hengyuan	0–1	2–0	0–0	2–5	1–1	3–2	1–1	0–1	0–0		2–0	1–1	1–1	1–2	0–1	2–2
Qingdao Jonoon	0–0	0–1	2–2	2–1	1–1	0–1	1–0	1–1	0–0	0–2		0–1	1–3	0–2	3–2	1–1
Shaanxi Renhe	0–0	1–0	5–0	2–2	1–1	0–2	1–1	1–1	1–0	0–3	1–0		1–0	2–1	3–2	0–0
Shandong Luneng Taishan	1–0	2–2	4–1	3–0	2–1	4–2	2–2	3–0	2–0	1–0	1–1	1–0		5–2	3–2	1–0
Shanghai Shenhua	3–2	1–0	2–1	1–2	1–1	2–1	3–3	1–0	2–2	1–3	0–0	3–2	1–2		1–0	1–0
Shenzhen	1–1	2–1	2–0	3–1	0–0	0–1	1–1	0–0	4–4	1–0	3–4	1–3	0–1	0–4		1–2
Tianjin TEDA	0–0	1–2	3–2	1–1	3–4	0–0	2–1	2–1	2–1	1–0	2–1	3–1	1–1	0–2	1–0	

Updated to match(es) played on 6 November 2010. Source: Results on the official site of the Chinese Super League
Legend: Blue = home team win; Yellow = draw; Red = away team win.

== Top scorers ==
Updated to games played on 6 November 2010.

Rank	Player	Club	Goals
1	(Colombia) Duvier Riascos	Shanghai Shenhua	20
2	(China) Han Peng	Shandong Luneng	17
3	(Honduras) Luis Ramírez	Hangzhou Greentown	14
4	(Brazil) José Duarte	Chongqing Lifan	10
4	(Brazil) Leandro Netto	Henan Jianye	10
4	(China) Chen Zhizhao	Nanchang Hengyuan	10
4	(China) Yang Xu	Liaoning Whowin	10
4	(South Korea) Ahn Jung-hwan	Dalian Shide	10
9	(Costa Rica) Johnny Woodly	Chongqing Lifan	9
9	(Zambia) James Chamanga	Dalian Shide	9

== Awards ==
- Chinese Football Association Footballer of the Year: (Colombia) Duvier Riascos (Shanghai Shenhua)
- Chinese Super League Golden Boot Winner: (Colombia) Duvier Riascos (Shanghai Shenhua)
- Chinese Football Association Young Player of the Year: (China) Zheng Zheng (Shandong Luneng)
- Chinese Football Association Manager of the Year: (Croatia) Branko Ivanković (Shandong Luneng)
- Chinese Football Association Referee of the Year: (China) Sun Baojie
- Chinese Super League Fair Play Award: Nanchang Hengyuan, Jiangsu Sainty, Tianjin TEDA
