= Song Tae-lim =

South Korean footballer (born 1984)

Song Tae-Lim
Personal information
- Date of birth: 20 February 1984 (age 42)
- Place of birth: Geoje, Gyeongnam, South Korea
- Height: 1.87 m (6 ft 2 in)
- Positions: Midfielder; defender

Youth career
- 2002–2005: Chung-Ang University

Senior career*
| Years | Team | Apps | (Gls) |
| 2006–2007 | Chunnam Dragons | 5 | (0) |
| 2008 | Busan I'Park | 0 | (0) |
| 2009–2010 | Henan Construction | 55 | (3) |
| 2011 | Goyang KB | 5 | (0) |
| 2012 | Shenyang Dongjin | 29 | (5) |
- * Club domestic league appearances and goals as of 17 February 2011

- Song Tae-lim
- Hangul: 송태림
- Hanja: 宋泰林
- RR: Song Taerim
- MR: Song T'aerim

Song Tae-Lim (Korean: 송태림; Hanja: 宋泰林; born 20 February 1984) is a retired South Korean football defender.

== Club career statistics ==
Last update: 28 April 2010

| Club performance | | | League | | Cup | | League Cup | | Continental | | Total | |
| Season | Club | League | Apps | Goals | Apps | Goals | Apps | Goals | Apps | Goals | Apps | Goals |
| South Korea | | | League | | KFA Cup | | League Cup | | Asia | | Total | |
|---|---|---|---|---|---|---|---|---|---|---|---|---|
| 2006 | Chunnam Dragons | K-League | 1 | 0 | 0 | 0 | 2 | 0 | - | | 3 | 0 |
| 2007 | Chunnam Dragons | K-League | 4 | 0 | 1 | 0 | 0 | 0 | - | | 5 | 0 |
| 2008 | Busan I'Park | K-League | 0 | 0 | 0 | 0 | 1 | 0 | - | | 1 | 0 |
| China PR | | | League | | FA Cup | | CSL Cup | | Asia | | Total | |
| 2009 | Henan Construction | Chinese Super League | 28 | 1 | - | | - | | - | | 28 | 1 |
| 2010 | Henan Construction | Chinese Super League | 27 | 2 | - | | - | | 6 | 1 | 33 | 3 |
| Total | South Korea | | 5 | 0 | 1 | 0 | 3 | 0 | - | | 9 | 0 |
| Total | China PR | | 55 | 3 | 0 | 0 | 0 | 0 | 6 | 1 | 61 | 4 |
| Career total | | | 60 | 3 | 1 | 0 | 3 | 0 | 6 | 1 | 70 | 4 |

== Interntiaonl goals ==
=== Henan Jianye ===
| No. | Date | Venue | Opponent | Score | Result | Competition |
|---|---|---|---|---|---|---|
| 1. | 27 April 2010 | Zhengzhou Hanghai Stadium, Zhengzhou, China | (Japan) Gamba Osaka | 1–1 | 1–1 | 2010 AFC Champions League |
