= Alfred Emuejeraye =

Nigerian footballer (born 1983)

Personal information
- Full name: Alfred Emuejeraye Omoefe
- Date of birth: 13 January 1983 (age 43)
- Place of birth: Lagos, Nigeria
- Height: 1.90 m (6 ft 3 in)
- Position: Forward

Senior career*
Years	Team	Apps	(Gls)
2000–2003	Julius Berger		
2003	Grasshoppers Zürich	7	(0)
2004–2006	Julius Berger		
2006–2007	Gombak United	17	(11)
2008	SR Delémont	13	(4)
2008–2009	FC Wohlen	33	(9)
2010	Tianjin Teda	7	(1)
2011–2012	YF Juventus	9	(5)
2012–2013	FC Rapperswil-Jona	12	(2)
2014–2015	FC Stade Nyonnais	12	(1)
2015–2016	United Zürich	14	(6)
2016–2017	FC Dietikon	11	(8)
2017	NK Pajde	12	(4)
2017–2018	FC Altstetten		
2018–2019	Chur 97	20	(8)

International career^{‡}
- Nigeria U-23
- * Club domestic league appearances and goals as of 8 November 2016 ‡ National team caps and goals as of 8 November 2016

Alfred Emuejeraye (born 13 January 1983) is a Nigerian footballer.

== Club career ==
Emuejeraye started his career at Julius Berger, and played there until 2003. He joined Grasshopper Club Zürich in 2003 and then returned to Julius Berger. He moved to Singapore to play the 2006–07 season for Gombak United but returned to Switzerland to play the 2007–08 season for SR Delémont. After trials at Serbian side FK Partizan, where he played in two friendly games and scored one goal, he was signed by FC Wohlen on 18 August 2008 and played with them in the 2008–09 season.

Emuejeraye moved to China and joined Tianjin Teda on 28 February 2010. He made 7 appearances and scored once at the 2010 Chinese Super League but was released in June of that year due to contractual disputes. He then returned to Switzerland to play for SC YF Juventus and FC Stade Nyonnais. In summer 2016, he joined FC Dietikon.

He is the brother of Singapore international Precious Emuejeraye.
