= Josip Bulat =

Josip Bulat may refer to:

- Josip Bulat (footballer, born 1972), Croatian former professional footballer
- Josip Bulat (footballer, born 1905) (1905–1970), Croatian and Yugoslav footballer and manager
