= Zé Roberto (footballer, born 1981) =

Brazilian footballer

Personal information
- Full name: José Roberto Lucini
- Date of birth: 31 May 1981 (age 45)
- Place of birth: Francisco Beltrão, Brazil
- Height: 1.87 m (6 ft 1 1/2 in)
- Position: Defender

Team information
- Current team: Athletic-MG (assistant)

Youth career
- Internacional

Senior career*
Years	Team	Apps	(Gls)
1999–2001	Santo Ângelo		
2001–2002	Monza		
2003	Vitória		
2004	Marília		
2005	Mogi Mirim		
2005	Vitória		
2005	São Caetano		
2005–2007	Pogoń Szczecin	16	(0)
2007–2008	Rio Branco de Andradas		
2008	Liaoning Hongyun	5	(0)
2009–2015	Luverdense	9	(0)
2010	São José		
2009–2015	Luverdense	49	(2)
2015–2016	Paraná	23	(1)
2017	Veranópolis	12	(0)

Managerial career
- 2019: Londrina U17
- 2020: Luverdense
- 2022: São Joseense U20
- 2023: São Joseense
- 2024: Cianorte
- 2024: Foz do Iguaçu
- 2025: Antalyaspor (assistant)
- 2025: Paraná U20
- 2025–2026: Operário Ferroviário (assistant)
- 2026–: Athletic-MG (assistant)
- * Club domestic league appearances and goals

José Roberto Lucini (born 31 May 1981), commonly known as Zé Roberto, is a Brazilian football coach and former player who played as a defender. He is the current assistant coach of Athletic-MG.
