= Roberto Batres =

Spanish footballer

Personal information
- Full name: Roberto Batres Díaz
- Date of birth: 8 January 1986 (age 40)
- Place of birth: Madrid, Spain
- Height: 1.88 m (6 ft 2 in)
- Position: Attacking midfielder

Youth career
- 1996–2004: Atlético Madrid

Senior career*
Years	Team	Apps	(Gls)
2004–2005	Atlético Madrid C		
2005–2011	Atlético Madrid B	93	(19)
2009–2010	→ Albacete (loan)	1	(0)
2010	→ Shanghai Shenhua (loan)	0	(0)
2011	Alcoyano	8	(0)
2012	AGOVV	0	(0)
2012–2013	Leganés	27	(4)
2013–2014	Huesca	11	(1)
Total		140	(24)

International career
2002	Spain U17	1	(0)
- * Club domestic league appearances and goals

Roberto Batres Díaz (born 8 January 1986) is a Spanish former professional footballer who played as an attacking midfielder.

== Club career ==
Born in Madrid, Batres joined Atlético Madrid's youth ranks at the age of 10. After one season with the C team in the Tercera División, he went on to spend six years at the reserves in the Segunda División B, scoring nine goals in only 15 games in 2007–08.

In August 2009, Batres was loaned to Albacete Balompié on a six-month deal, but failed to make an impact at the Segunda División side, playing just 16 minutes in a 0–0 home draw against Real Sociedad. The following January, he joined Chinese club Shanghai Shenhua F.C. on loan until the end of the campaign; however, he suffered another serious knee injury and returned to Madrid for surgery and rehabilitation.

In early December 2010, Batres returned to action for Atlético B. In late August 2011, he left the Vicente Calderón Stadium and signed for CD Alcoyano, recently promoted to the second tier.

After only totalling 289 minutes in the first half of 2011–12, Batres was fired in late December for comments made on Facebook in which he implied he would not return to the team if he won the lottery. He then moved to the Netherlands, signing with AGOVV on 31 January 2012; he failed to make a single appearance for his new club and returned home, going on to represent CD Leganés and SD Huesca of the third division before retiring at the age of 28.
