= Stojan Ignatov =

Macedonian footballer

Stojan Ignjatov
Personal information
- Full name: Stojance Ignjatov; Стојан Игнатов
- Date of birth: 22 December 1979 (age 46)
- Place of birth: Probištip, SFR Yugoslavia
- Height: 1.70 m (5 ft 7 in)
- Position: Midfielder

Youth career
- Rudar Probištip

Senior career*
Years	Team	Apps	(Gls)
1999–2002	Sileks	65	(24)
2003	Samsunspor	14	(0)
2003–2007	Rabotnički	111	(24)
2008	Beijing Guoan	1	(0)
2009–2010	Poli Iași	39	(2)
2010–2012	Ethnikos Achna	37	(4)
2012–2013	Metalurg Skopje	26	(2)
2013	Teteks	1	(0)

International career^{‡}
	Macedonia U19	7	(1)
	Macedonia U21	11	(2)
2001–2005	Macedonia	11	(0)
- * Club domestic league appearances and goals as of 10 August 2013 ‡ National team caps and goals as of 10 August 2008

Stojan Ignatov (Macedonian: Стојан Игнатов; born 22 December 1979) is a Macedonian retired football midfielder.

== Club career ==
He finished his career at FK Teteks. He played for Ethnikos Achna FC in Cyprus.

== International career ==
He made his senior debut for Macedonia in a July 2001 friendly match against Qatar and has earned a total of 11 caps, scoring no goals. His final international was a September 2005 FIFA World Cup qualification match against Finland.

== Honours and awards ==
- FK Sileks Kratovo
  - First Macedonian Football League: 1
    - Runner-up:1998–99
- FK Rabotnički Skopje
  - First Macedonian Football League: 2
    - Winner: 2004–05, 2005–06
