= Matías Marchesini =

Argentine footballer

Personal information
- Full name: Matías Alberto Marchesini
- Date of birth: May 3, 1979 (age 47)
- Place of birth: Gualeguaychú, Argentina
- Height: 1.74 m (5 ft 9 in)
- Position: Centre-back

Youth career
- 1985–1995: Juventud Unida
- 1995–1997: River Plate
- 1998–1999: Boca Juniors

Senior career*
Years	Team	Apps	(Gls)
2000–2003	Boca Juniors	0	(0)
2000	→ América (loan)	0	(0)
2001	→ Los Andes (loan)	23	(1)
2001–2002	→ Independiente (loan)	11	(0)
2002–2003	→ Los Andes (loan)	32	(2)
2003	→ Central Entrerriano (loan)	0	(0)
2004	Técnico Universitario	34	(1)
2005	Deportes Temuco	24	(4)
2006	Delfín SC	16	(4)
2006–2007	Alvarado	27	(8)
2007	Juventud Unida		
2008	Macará	5	(0)
2008	Shanghai Shenhua	5	(1)
2009	Tristán Suárez	8	(0)
2009–2010	Juventud Unida		
2010	Guaraní Antonio Franco	5	(0)
2011	Universitario de Sucre	20	(0)
2011–2012	The Strongest	24	(0)
2012	Real Cartagena	11	(1)
2013–2018	Juventud Unida	133	(7)
- * Club domestic league appearances and goals

Matías Alberto Marchesini (born 3 May 1979, in Gualeguaychú) is a retired Argentine footballer, who played as a centre-back. He made 442 appearances and 32 goals.
