= Raman Kirenkin =

Belarusian footballer (born 1981)

Personal information
- Date of birth: 20 February 1981 (age 45)
- Place of birth: Volgograd, Russian SFSR
- Height: 1.92 m (6 ft 4 in)
- Position: Defender

Team information
- Current team: Baranovichi (manager)

Youth career
- Kharkiv Olympic Reserve School

Senior career*
| Years | Team | Apps | (Gls) |
| 1997–1998 | Metalist-2 Kharkiv | 8 | (0) |
| 2000–2002 | Dnepr-Transmash Mogilev | 63 | (4) |
| 2003 | Dinamo Minsk | 10 | (0) |
| 2003–2005 | Naftan Novopolotsk | 37 | (5) |
| 2006 | Gomel | 14 | (0) |
| 2007–2008 | Torpedo Zhodino | 34 | (1) |
| 2008 | Liaoning Hongyun | 18 | (5) |
| 2009–2012 | Shakhtyor Soligorsk | 54 | (4) |

International career
| 2002–2004 | Belarus U21 | 16 | (2) |
| 2007–2008 | Belarus | 5 | (0) |

Managerial career
- 2013–2016: Shakhtyor Soligorsk (assistant)
- 2017: Belarus U17
- 2019–2021: Slavia Mozyr (assistant)
- 2022: BATE Borisov (assistant)
- 2022–2024: Isloch Minsk Raion (assistant)
- 2024–: Baranovichi
- * Club domestic league appearances and goals

Raman Kirenkin (Belarusian: Раман Кірэнкін; Russian: Роман Киренкин; born 20 February 1981) is a Russian-born Belarusian football coach and former player and Belarus international.

== Honours ==
Dinamo Minsk

- Belarusian Cup: 2002–03
