= Justo Meza =

Paraguayan footballer (born 1979)

Personal information
- Full name: Justo Rolando Meza
- Date of birth: 20 September 1979 (age 47)
- Place of birth: Paraguay
- Position: Striker

Senior career*
Years	Team	Apps	(Gls)
- Club Sport Colombia
2004-2005	12 de Octubre Football Club		
2006	Club Olimpia		
2007	Club Bolívar		
2007	Sportivo Trinidense		
2008	Shanghai Greenland Shenhua F.C.		(1)
2009/2010	Deportivo Xinabajul		(1)
2010	Club Silvio Pettirossi		
2011	Club Presidente Hayes		
2012	Club 29 de Setiembre		
- * Club domestic league appearances and goals

Justo Meza (Chinese: 梅萨; born 20 September 1979 in Paraguay) is a Paraguayan retired footballer.

== China ==
Introduced at Shanghai Shenhua mid-season 2008 despite coach Wu Jingui not regarding him as a prototypical forward, Meza debuted as they took on Guangzhou, but did not perform to expectations in his first two appearances, with new manager Jia Xiuquan asking fans to be patient with the Paraguayan. However, even though he broke his duck with a header to take the lead over Zhejiang Greentown, which ended 2-2, Shenhua decided not to extended his contract that winter.
