= Pedro Henrique (footballer, born November 1985) =

Brazilian footballer

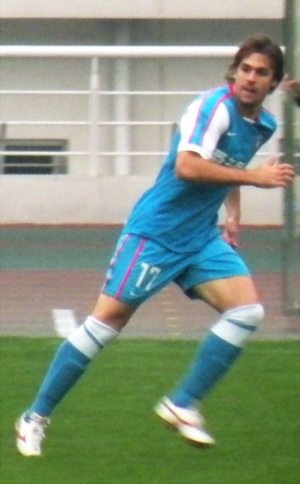

Personal information
- Full name: Pedro Henrique Martins Cassia
- Date of birth: November 1, 1985 (age 40)
- Place of birth: Orindiúva, Brazil
- Height: 1.85 m (6 ft 1 in)
- Position: Striker

Team information
- Current team: Kelantan FA

Senior career*
Years	Team	Apps	(Gls)
2007–2009	Paulista		
2007–2008	→ Lausanne Sport (loan)	18	(2)
2008	→ Fortaleza (loan)		
2009	→ Santa Cruz (loan)		
2009	Bragantino	17	(1)
2010	Rio Claro		
2010	Jiangsu Sainty	9	(2)
2010–2011	Volta Redonda		
2011	Kalmar FF	8	(0)
2012	Guaratinguetá		
- * Club domestic league appearances and goals as of 28 July 2012

Pedro Henrique Martins Cassia (born November 1, 1985) is a Brazilian footballer.

Pedro began his career in 2007 with Paulista, and soon was loaned to several clubs, such as Lausanne Sports, Fortaleza and Santa Cruz.

He transferred to Bragantino in July 2009. Soon after he transferred to Rio Claro in January 2010, Pedro decided to make another move. He joined Jiangsu Sainty in February. And after one season with the club he joined Volta Redonda in Brazilian Série D. On 26 July 2011 he joined the Swedish club Kalmar FF.
