= Éber (footballer) =

Brazilian footballer

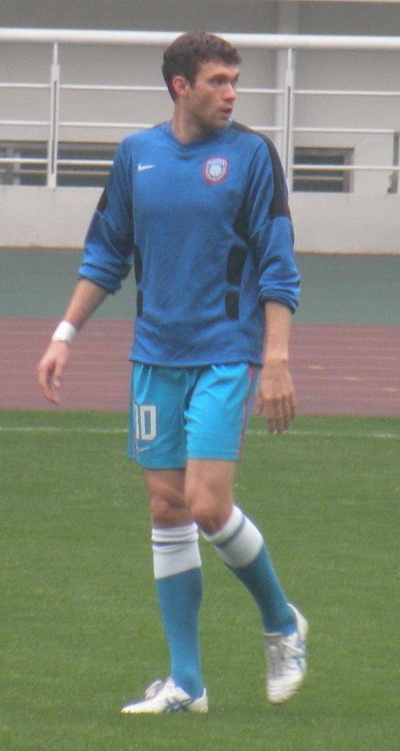

Personal information
- Full name: Éber Luís Cucchi
- Date of birth: September 20, 1981 (age 45)
- Place of birth: Caxias do Sul, Brazil
- Height: 1.91 m (6 ft 3 in)
- Position: Striker

Senior career*
Years	Team	Apps	(Gls)
2000–2001	EC Pelotas	?	(?)
2001	Guarani VA	?	(?)
2002	SER Juventude	?	(?)
2003	FC Santa Cruz	?	(?)
2004–2005	Ypiranga Futebol Clube	?	(?)
2006–2007	SC Ulbra	?	(?)
2007	Juventude	16	(3)
2008–2009	Tianjin Teda	42	(16)
2010	Jiangsu Sainty	10	(1)
2010	Novo Hamburgo		
2011	Veranópolis	6	(4)
2011	Qingdao Jonoon	20	(5)
2012	Chapecoense	1	(0)
2013	Passo Fundo	6	(0)
2014	Lajeadense	12	(5)
2014	EC Pelotas	5	(2)
- * Club domestic league appearances and goals

Éber Luís Cucchi (born September 20, 1981 in Caxias do Sul) is a Brazilian footballer where he plays as a forward.

== Club career ==
Éber was signed by Tianjin Teda F.C. at the beginning of the 2008 Chinese Super League season and quickly became a vital member of the team when he scored 14 goals in 20 matches to become the top goal scorer in the league. He achieved that despite being banned for 8 games during the season for a violent tackle against Li Zhihai in a game against Guangzhou F.C. on June 25, 2008 and was fined 8000 yuan. With the club reaching its best position in several years and the chance to play for the 2009 AFC Champions League for the first time, expectations were high for Éber to repeat his success; however, he only achieved two goals throughout the 2009 Chinese Super League season and was released by the club at the end of the season.

Éber joined another Chinese Super League team in Jiangsu Sainty in February 2010. His move was extremely disappointing as he struggled to find the net and was released during the summer league break. Éber returned to Brazil to join lower league side Veranópolis before having another chance to join a Chinese team in Qingdao Jonoon at the beginning of the 2011 Chinese Super League.

== Honours ==
Tianjin Teda

- Chinese Super League 2008 Top Scorer (14 goals)
