= Kevaughn Connell =

Trinidadian footballer (born 1986)

Personal information
- Date of birth: 23 July 1986 (age 40)
- Place of birth: St. Augustine, Trinidad and Tobago
- Height: 1.85 m (6 ft 1 in)
- Position: Winger

Senior career*
Years	Team	Apps	(Gls)
2003–2004	Joe Public	3	(0)
2005–2006	San Juan Jabloteh	5	(0)
2006–2007	Cannes	21	(3)
2007–2008	Sannois Saint-Gratien	16	(2)
2009–2010	San Juan Jabloteh		(0)
2010	Nanchang Bayi	1	(0)
2010–2011	North East Stars		(0)
2012–2013	Central F.C.		
2013–2015	Caledonia AIA		
2015–?	University of Trinidad & Tobago		

International career
2008–2011	Trinidad and Tobago	6	(0)
- * Club domestic league appearances and goals

Kevaughn Connell (born 23 July 1986) is a Trinidadian former professional footballer who played as a winger.

== Club career ==
Connell has previously played for Joe Public and San Juan Jabloteh in Trinidad and Tobago and Cannes and Sannois Saint-Gratien in France's Championnat National. He joined Nanchang Bayi of the Chinese Super League in March 2010 and was released in May.

== International career ==
Connell made his international debut for the Trinidad and Tobago national team against Grenada on 24 April 2008, and also played in the friendly against England in June 2008.
