= Geninho (footballer, born 1980) =

Brazilian footballer

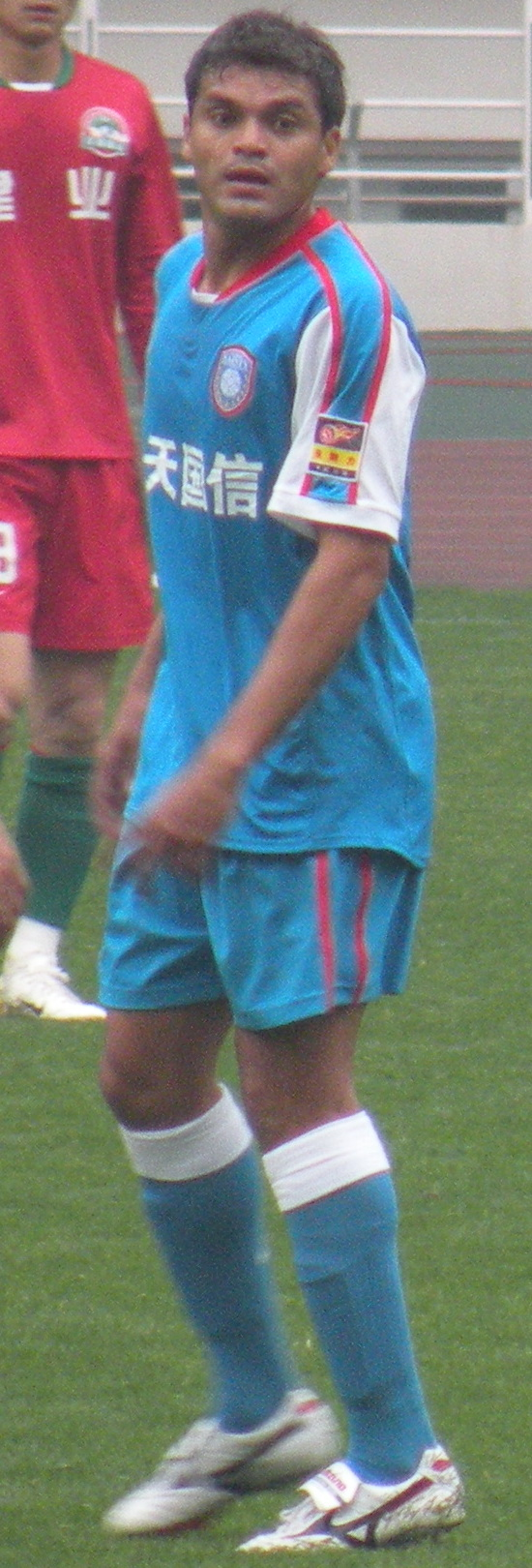

Personal information
- Full name: Genivaldo Francisco dos Santos
- Date of birth: February 11, 1980 (age 46)
- Place of birth: São Miguel dos Campos, Brazil
- Height: 1.77 m (5 ft 10 in)
- Position: Midfielder

Senior career*
Years	Team	Apps	(Gls)
2001–2002	CSA		
2002–2003	Internacional		
2004	Criciúma		
2005	Sport		
2006	Ceilândia		
2006–2008	Coruripe		
2008	CRB		
2009	Novo Hamburgo		
2009–2010	Jiangsu Sainty	43	(1)
- * Club domestic league appearances and goals as of 6 November 2010

Genivaldo Francisco dos Santos or Geninho (born February 11, 1980) is a Brazilian footballer who last played for Jiangsu Sainty.

Geninho used to play for several football clubs in Brazil such as CSA, Internacional, Criciúma, Sport, Ceilândia, Coruripe, CRB and Novo Hamburgo.

Geninho joined Jiangsu Sainty with an undisclosed fee in July 2009. He did well in season 2009 and the club extended his contract for one years.
