= Danilo (footballer, born 1980) =

Brazilian footballer

Personal information
- Full name: Danilo Moreira Serrano
- Date of birth: 19 August 1980 (age 46)
- Place of birth: São José do Rio Preto, Brazil
- Height: 1.84 m (6 ft 0 in)
- Position: Defender

Senior career*
Years	Team	Apps	(Gls)
2001–2004	Coritiba	?	(?)
2004–2006	Académica	45	(2)
2007	Juventude	10	(0)
2008	Wuhan Guanggu		
2009	Guarani		
2009	Fortaleza	3	(0)
2009–2010	Hapoel Beer Sheva	28	(1)
2011	Mirassol		
- * Club domestic league appearances and goals

Danilo Moreira Serrano (born 19 August 1980), known as just Danilo, is a Brazilian former professional footballer who played as a defender.
