= Luciano Ratinho =

Brazilian footballer

Personal information
- Full name: Luciano Ferreira Gabriel
- Date of birth: October 18, 1979 (age 47)
- Place of birth: Ribeirão Preto, Brazil
- Height: 1.73 m (5 ft 8 in)
- Position: Midfielder

Team information
- Current team: Anapolina

Senior career*
Years	Team	Apps	(Gls)
1999	Botafogo	8	(0)
2001–2003	Corinthians	21	(1)
2003	Juventude	13	(3)
2004	Grêmio	10	(0)
2005	GE Mauaense	10	(0)
2005	Daejeon Citizen	14	(1)
2006	Portuguesa Santista	?	(?)
2006	Paysandu	6	(1)
2006–2008	Beira-Mar	23	(3)
2008	Shandong Luneng	24	(1)
2009	Vila Nova	4	(1)
2009	América Mineiro		
2010	Chapecoense	1	(0)
2010	Sertãozinho		
2011	Monte Azul		
2011	Tupi	14	(4)
2012–	Anapolina		
- * Club domestic league appearances and goals as of 03:41, 26 November 2011 (UTC)

Luciano Ferreira Gabriel (born 18 October 1979 in Ribeirão Preto), known as Luciano Ratinho, is a Brazilian footballer. He plays for Anapolina.

== Career ==
Luciano Ratinho previously played for Botafogo-SP, Corinthians, Juventude and Grêmio in the Campeonato Brasileiro.

=== Shandong Luneng ===
He scored his first goal for Shandong Luneng on September 27, 2008 vs Liaoning Hongyun as a substitute.
