= Cédric Sabin =

French footballer (born 1979)

Personal information
- Full name: Cédric Cyril Sabin
- Date of birth: 2 November 1979 (age 46)
- Place of birth: Paris, France
- Height: 1.87 m (6 ft 2 in)
- Position: Forward

Senior career*
Years	Team	Apps	(Gls)
1999–2000	Langon-Castets		
2000–2001	ESA Brive		
2001–2002	Red Star		
2002–2003	Gueugnon	18	(4)
2003–2004	US Créteil	31	(5)
2004–2006	Sedan	65	(12)
2006	Al-Ahli		(2)
2007–2008	Konyaspor	28	(4)
2008–2010	Vannes	16	(1)
2010	Shaanxi Chan-Ba	8	(0)
2011–2013	Red Star	57	(15)

International career
2012	Martinique	2	(2)
- * Club domestic league appearances and goals

Cédric Cyril Sabin (born 2 November 1979) is a French former professional footballer who played as a forward. At international level, he represented the Martinique national team scoring two goals in two appearances in 2012.

== Career ==
Sabin was born in Paris.

He played two seasons for Konyaspor in the Turkish Süper Lig.

On 15 March 2010, he signed for Shaanxi Chan-Ba from Vannes OC.

== Honours ==
Vannes

- Coupe de la Ligue: runner-up 2008–09
