= Delain Sasa =

Democratic Republic of the Congo footballer (born 1979)

Personal information
- Date of birth: 9 March 1979 (age 47)
- Place of birth: Kinshasa, Zaire
- Height: 1.87 m (6 ft 2 in)
- Position: Forward

Senior career*
Years	Team	Apps	(Gls)
1998–1999	KFC Uerdingen 05	9	(0)
1999–2000	Bayer Leverkusen II		
2000–2002	Erzurumspor	15	(0)
2002–2003	FK Partizani Tirana		
2003–2004	GFC Düren		
2004–2005	Bonner SC		
2005–2006	FK Partizani Tirana		
2006–2007	Flamurtari Vlore		
2007–2008	Vllaznia Shkodër		
2008	KS Bylis Ballsh		
2008	Liaoning Hongyun	11	(1)
- * Club domestic league appearances and goals

Delain Sasa (born 9 March 1979) is a DR Congolese former professional footballer who played as a forward. He played in Germany for Bayer Leverkusen II and KFC Uerdingen 05, in Turkey for Erzurumspor, and in Albania for KF Partizani Tirana and Flamurtari.
