= Michael Valenzuela =

Paraguayan footballer (born 1980)

Michel Valenzuela
Personal information
- Full name: Michel Marcio Valenzuela
- Date of birth: 19 February 1980 (age 46)
- Place of birth: Villa Elisa, Paraguay
- Height: 1.78 m (5 ft 10 in)
- Position: Midfielder

Senior career*
Years	Team	Apps	(Gls)
2000–2002	Sol de América	3	(0)
2003–2006	Tacuary	17	(0)
2004	→ Olimpia (loan)	5	(0)
2007	Palestino	13	(0)
2007–2012	Shenzhen Shangqingyin	85	(0)
2012	Sportivo Carapeguá	12	(1)
2013	Deportivo Capiatá	1	(0)
Total		134	(1)
- * Club domestic league appearances and goals

Michel Marcio Valenzuela (born 19 February 1980) is a Paraguayan former footballer who played as a midfielder.

== Career ==
Valenzuela started his career with Sol de América in 2000. He continued his career with Tacuary and Olimpia in his homeland.

Abroad, Valenzuela played in the Primera División de Chile with Palestino during 2007. In the same year, he switched to Chinese club Shenzhen Shangqingyin.

Back in Paraguay, Valenzuela joined Sportivo Carapeguá in 2012. The next year, he played for Deportivo Capiatá.
