= Milan Nikolić (footballer, born 1983) =

Serbian footballer

Personal information
- Full name: Milan Nikolić
- Date of birth: 30 March 1983 (age 43)
- Place of birth: Kruševac, SFR Yugoslavia
- Height: 1.86 m (6 ft 1 in)
- Position: Midfielder

Senior career*
Years	Team	Apps	(Gls)
2001–2004	Napredak Kruševac	58	(5)
2004–2008	Smederevo	71	(4)
2008	Changsha Ginde	3	(0)
2008–2009	Napredak Kruševac	17	(0)
2009	Pakhtakor Tashkent		
2010–2011	Irtysh Pavlodar	40	(1)
2012–2013	Luftëtari	22	(2)
2013	Zvijezda Gradačac	17	(0)
2014	Vllaznia Shkodër	10	(0)
2014	Moravac Mrštane	3	(0)
2015	Jedinstvo Bijelo Polje		
2015–2018	Trayal Kruševac		

International career
2004	Serbia and Montenegro U21	1	(0)

Managerial career
- 2021-2022: Meševo Kruševac
- 2023-2024: Meševo Kruševac
- 2025: Napredak Kruševac
- * Club domestic league appearances and goals

Milan Nikolić (Serbian Cyrillic: Милан Николић; born 30 March 1983) is a retired Serbian professional footballer who played as a midfielder.

Nikolić represented Serbia and Montenegro at under-21 level.
