= Erivaldo Saraiva =

Brazilian footballer (born 1980)

Personal information
- Full name: Erivaldo Antonio Saraiva
- Date of birth: 22 November 1980 (age 45)
- Place of birth: Cubatão, São Paulo, Brazil
- Height: 1.94 m (6 ft 4 in)
- Position: Striker

Senior career*
Years	Team	Apps	(Gls)
2002	São Vicente	?	(?)
2003	Palmeiras	?	(?)
2004	Juventus AC	?	(?)
2004	Rio Branco EC	?	(?)
2005	Jataiense	?	(?)
2005	EC Pelotas	?	(?)
2006	Nova Iguaçu	?	(?)
2006	Moto Club	9	(1)
2007	Atlético Sorocaba	?	(?)
2007	Luziânia	?	(?)
2007	CS Hammam-Lif	15	(3)
2008–2009	Hangzhou Greentown	49	(23)
2010	Beijing Guoan	9	(0)
2010	Shonan Bellmare	8	(0)
2011	Liaoning Whowin	30	(5)
2012	Chengdu Blades	27	(6)
- * Club domestic league appearances and goals as of 25 January 2012

Erivaldo Antonio Saraiva (born 22 November 1980), commonly known as Erivaldo Saraiva or sometimes Valdo, is a Brazilian football (soccer) striker.

== Club career ==
=== Early career in Brazil ===
During his early career, Valdo played for São Vicente and then Palmeiras when they were in the Second Division. Unable to hold down a regular place within the team despite seeing them go back up in the First Division he was allowed to leave the club and would become a journeyman for several other lower league Brazilian teams, which included Juventus AC, Rio Branco EC, Jataiense, EC Pelotas, Nova Iguaçu, Moto Club, Atlético Sorocaba and Luziânia.

=== CS Hammam-Lif ===
In 2007, he moved from Brazil for a transfer to a Tunisian club CS Hammam-Lif where he played in the First Division. His time with the club wasn't an inspired spell, however, the skill he tactical awareness he did show brought him to the attention of Chinese club Hangzhou Greentown F.C.

=== Hangzhou Greentown ===
Valdo moved to Hangzhou Greentown F.C. during the 2008 league season and where he immediately made an impact, he was their top goal scorer having racked up 10 goals in 7 league games. However, even with Valdo's impressive goal-scoring ability, the club was relegated from the Chinese Super League. On 26 July 2009, he scored a goal for Hangzhou in a 2-8 friendly defeat against Manchester United during United's tour of Asia.

=== Beijing Guoan ===
At the beginning of the 2010 league season he joined the league defending champions Beijing Guoan. He scored his first goal for the club on 28 April, in a 2–0 home win against Kawasaki Frontale on the 6th round of 2010 AFC Champions League group stage. Valdo was released by Beijing in June 2010.

=== Shonan Bellmare ===
Valdo was signed by Shonan Bellmare on 16 July 2010. He was released in the end of the season.

=== Liaoning Whowin ===
Valdo returned to China and signed a contract with Liaoning Whowin in Match 2011.
