= Mariko Daouda =

Ivorian footballer

Personal information
- Date of birth: 13 November 1981 (age 44)
- Place of birth: Abidjan, Ivory Coast
- Height: 1.83 m (6 ft 0 in)
- Position: Defender

Youth career
- 1992–1995: Stade Abidjan

Senior career*
Years	Team	Apps	(Gls)
1996–2000	Stade Abidjan	78	(3)
2000–2002	Bellinzona	25	(0)
2002–2005	FC U Craiova	63	(2)
2005	Dinamo București	5	(0)
2006–2007	Argeș Pitești	26	(0)
2007–2009	Dacia Mioveni	31	(2)
2008	→ Tianjin Teda (loan)	13	(2)
2010	Chongqing Lifan	12	(0)
Total		253	(9)

International career
1997	Ivory Coast U20	3	(0)
- * Club domestic league appearances and goals as of 6 November 2010

Mariko Daouda (born 13 November 1981 in Abidjan, Côte d'Ivoire) is a retired Ivorian footballer.

== Honours ==
Dinamo București

- Supercupa României: 2005
