= Obi Emmanuel Moneke =

Nigerian footballer

Obi Moneke
Personal information
- Full name: Obi Emmanuel Moneke
- Date of birth: November 2, 1983 (age 42)
- Place of birth: Ibadan, Nigeria
- Height: 1.89 m (6 ft 2 in)
- Position: Midfielder

Senior career*
Years	Team	Apps	(Gls)
2003–2004	Kilikia F.C.	30	(1)
?–2007	Kano Pillars	?	(?)
2008–2010	Henan Construction	30	(5)
2011	Guizhou Zhicheng	8	(1)
- * Club domestic league appearances and goals as of 1 January 2010

Obi Moneke (born November 2, 1983) is a Nigerian footballer.

Moneke was a member of Nigerian Beach Soccer National team in 2007 FIFA Beach Soccer World Cup.

== Club career ==
Moneke played for Armenian football club Kilikia F.C. for two seasons where he made 30 appearances and scored one goal.

Moneke moved to China and signed a contract with Henan Construction as an appendage of Polish striker Emmanuel Olisadebe in 2008. He scored his first CSL goal on 9 April to put Henan Construction 1-1 up against Dalian Shide.
