= Lee Jae-won (footballer, born 1983) =

South Korean footballer

Personal information
- Full name: Lee Jae-won
- Date of birth: 4 March 1983 (age 43)
- Place of birth: South Korea
- Height: 1.82 m (5 ft 11 1/2 in)
- Position: Defender

Team information
- Current team: Bucheon FC 1995

Youth career
- 2002–2005: Korea University

Senior career*
Years	Team	Apps	(Gls)
2006–2007	Ulsan Hyundai	6	(0)
2008–2010	Qingdao Jonoon		
2010–2012	Goyang KB	45	(7)
2013–2014	Ulsan Hyundai Mipo	35	(7)
2014	Ulsan Hyundai	13	(1)
2015–2016	Pohang Steelers	19	(0)
2017–	Bucheon FC 1995	3	(0)
- * Club domestic league appearances and goals as of 10 January 2018

Lee Jae-won (Korean: 이재원; born 4 March 1983) is a South Korean footballer who plays as defender for Bucheon FC 1995 in K League 2.

== Career ==
Lee joined Ulsan Hyundai before the 2006 season starts.

He signed with Pohang Steelers in March 2015.

After 2016 season, he moved to Bucheon FC 1995. Therefore he is appointed as a subcaptain in 2017 season.
