= 2019−20 FK Zvijezda 09 season =

Zvijezda 09
2019–20 season
- Chairman: Boris Stanišić
- Manager: Boris Savić (until 31 August); Slavoljub Bubanja (from 6 September) – (until 6 October); Adnan Zildžović (from 9 October) – (until 9 March); Perica Ognjenović (from 9 March)
- Stadium: Ugljevik City Stadium
- Premijer Liga BiH: 12th (relegated)
- Kup BiH: Round of 16
- Top goalscorer: League: Ognjen Đelmić (5); All: Ognjen Đelmić (5)
- Highest home attendance: 500 on several occasions
- Lowest home attendance: 150 vs Široki Brijeg (31 August 2019)
- Average home league attendance: 359
Home colours	Away colours	Third colours

The 2019–20 season was Zvijezda 09's 11th in existence and their 2nd season in the Premier League BH. Besides competing in the Premier League, the team also competed in the National Cup.

In that season, the league ended abruptly on 1 June 2020 due to the COVID-19 pandemic in Bosnia and Herzegovina and by default Zvijezda 09 finished in 12th place, getting relegated back to the First League of RS.

== Current squad ==
As of 25 May 2020

Note: Flags indicate national team as defined under FIFA eligibility rules; some limited exceptions apply. Players may hold more than one non-FIFA nationality.

No.	Pos.	Nation	Player
3	DF	BIH	Vladan Mandić
6	DF	BRA	Caique Chagas
7	MF	SRB	Milivoje Lazić
8	MF	SRB	Igor Blagojević
10	FW	BIH	Antonio Vidović
11	MF	BIH	Ognjen Đelmić
12	GK	BIH	Strahinja Manojlović
13	FW	BIH	Stefan Rakić

No.	Pos.	Nation	Player
14	DF	BIH	Kristijan Tojčić
15	FW	SRB	Goran Šujić
16	FW	NGA	Ejike Uzoenyi
20	DF	BIH	Vukašin Benović
22	MF	BIH	Dejan Popara
23	MF	BIH	Aleksandar Vojinović (Captain)
27	DF	BIH	Luka Janković
31	DF	BIH	Bojan Marković

== Competitions ==
=== Pre-season ===
30 June 2019 Friendly	(Bosnia and Herzegovina) Zvijezda 09	0 – 2	(Serbia) Partizan	Ugljevik
18:00		Report		Stadium: Ugljevik City Stadium

13 July 2019 Friendly	(Serbia) Spartak Subotica	4 – 3	(Bosnia and Herzegovina) Zvijezda 09	Subotica
18:00		Report		Stadium: Subotica City Stadium

=== League table ===
Pos	Team	Pld	W	D	L	GF	GA	GD	Pts	Qualification or relegation
8	Velež Mostar	22	9	5	8	25	23	+2	32	
9	Sloboda Tuzla	22	4	9	9	21	35	−14	21	
10	Mladost Doboj Kakanj	22	4	6	12	21	35	−14	18	
11	Čelik Zenica (Note: Čelik were initially relegated to the Prva Liga FBiH, but were then excluded from the league on 13 July 2020.) (R, D)	22	5	5	12	17	33	−16	17 (Note: Čelik were deducted 3 points due to debts that they didn't pay off on time.)	Excluded from Bosnian professional football, relegated to the League of Zenica-Doboj Canton
12	Zvijezda 09 (R)	22	1	5	16	12	51	−39	8	Relegation to the Prva Liga RS

Source: Rezultati.com
Rules for classification: 1) Points; 2) Goal difference; 3) Goals scored; 4) Head-to-head points; 5) Head-to-head goal difference; 6) Head-to-head away goals (only if two teams); 7) Head-to-head goals scored; 8) Goal difference; 9) Play-off. (Criteria 2 and 3 are not used to decide champion, UEFA competition qualification, or relegation)
(D) Disqualified; (R) Relegated

==== Results summary ====
Overall								Home						Away					
Pld	W	D	L	GF	GA	GD	Pts	W	D	L	GF	GA	GD	W	D	L	GF	GA	GD
22	1	5	16	12	51	−39	8	1	5	5	10	21	−11	0	0	11	2	30	−28

Last updated: complete.

==== Matches ====
20 July 2019 1	Zvijezda 09	1 – 5	Tuzla City	Ugljevik
17:30	Chagas (yellow card) 35'; Marković 50'	Report	Hasanović (yellow card) 12'; Crnkić 23' 36'; Kojić (yellow card) 39'; Tojčić 44' (o.g.); Ubiparip 74' (pen.); Efendić (yellow card) 77'; Ramić 81'	Stadium: Ugljevik City Stadium; Attendance: 500; Referee: Frano Jelić

27 July 2019 2	Borac	1 – 0	Zvijezda 09	Banja Luka
20:30	Vranješ 24'; Danilović (yellow card) 26'; Bosančić (yellow card) 52'; Janičić (yellow card) 66'	Report	Bangoura (yellow card) 69'; Stjepanović (yellow card) 78'; Lucas Jr. (yellow card) 88'	Stadium: Banja Luka City Stadium; Attendance: 4,500; Referee: Luka Bilbija

3 August 2019 3	Zvijezda 09	1 – 1	Mladost Doboj Kakanj	Ugljevik
17:30	Đelmić 32'; Tojčić (yellow card) 63'; Benović (yellow card) 78'; Chagas (yellow card) 90'	Report	Nikolić (yellow card) 40'; Bajić (yellow card) 56'; Crnički 64'; Horić (yellow card) 71'; Hiroš (yellow card) 75'	Stadium: Ugljevik City Stadium; Attendance: 250; Referee: Mateo Musa

17 August 2019 4	Zvijezda 09	2 – 2	Čelik Zenica	Ugljevik
17:30	Predragović 31' (yellow card) 60'; Vojinović (yellow card) 52'; Badji (yellow card) 54' (yellow-red card) 84'; Stjepanović 63'	Report	Leon (yellow card) 29'; Grahovac 61'; Dilaver 73' (yellow card) 77'	Stadium: Ugljevik City Stadium; Attendance: 300; Referee: Mateo Musa

24 August 2019 5	Sloboda Tuzla	1 – 0	Zvijezda 09	Tuzla
19:00	Maksimović 57'; Mujagić (yellow card) 89'	Report	Mehmedagić (yellow card) 4'; Predragović (yellow card) 76'	Stadium: Tušanj City Stadium; Attendance: 3,000; Referee: Aleksandar Njegomirović

28 August 2019 6	Zrinjski	3 – 0	Zvijezda 09	Mostar
19:00	Badji 27' (o.g.); Govedarica 39'; Stojkić 62'; Šovšić (yellow card) 85'	Report	Benović (yellow card) 34'; Badji (yellow card) 40'; Marković (yellow card) 90'	Stadium: Stadion pod Bijelim Brijegom; Attendance: 1,700; Referee: Frano Jelić

31 August 2019 7	Zvijezda 09	0 – 0	Široki Brijeg	Ugljevik
17:00		Report	Hrkać (yellow card) 61'; Stanić (yellow card) 74'	Stadium: Ugljevik City Stadium; Attendance: 150; Referee: Admir Musić

15 September 2019 8	Sarajevo	2 – 0	Zvijezda 09	Sarajevo
19:30	Mustafić 43'; Ahmetović 53' (yellow card) 54'; Lazić (yellow card) 63'	Report	Tojčić (yellow card) 87'; Blagojević (yellow card) 90'	Stadium: Koševo City Stadium; Attendance: 2,500; Referee: Sabrija Topalović

22 September 2019 9	Zvijezda 09	1 – 2	Velež	Ugljevik
16:30	Hairlahović (yellow card) 26'; Benović (yellow card) 36'; Chagas (yellow card) 72'; Stjepanović 76' (yellow card) 77'; Badji (yellow card) 90'	Report	Vehabović 60'; Brandao 78'; Hasanović (yellow card) 84'; Fajić (yellow card) 90'	Stadium: Ugljevik City Stadium; Attendance: 350; Referee: Goran Paradžik

25 September 2019 10	Željezničar	6 – 0	Zvijezda 09	Sarajevo
20:00	Sipović 20' (yellow card) 80'; Vojinović 31' (o.g.); Štilić 37'; Ramović (yellow card) 45'; Zajmović 52' (yellow card) 78'; Hajdarević 73'; A. Zec 81'	Report		Stadium: Stadion Grbavica; Attendance: 2,763; Referee: Frano Jelić

28 September 2019 11	Zvijezda 09	1 – 4	Radnik Bijeljina	Ugljevik
16:00	Radović 21' (o.g.); Đelmić (yellow card) 25' (yellow-red card) 31'; Janković (red card) 77'	Report	Plavšić 57' (yellow card) 59'; Bradonjić 70' 80' 88'	Stadium: Ugljevik City Stadium; Attendance: 500; Referee: Admir Šehović

5 October 2019 12	Tuzla City	3 – 0	Zvijezda 09	Tuzla
15:30	Muminović (yellow card) 4'; Terzić (yellow card) 20'; Ramić 53'; Stanišić 60' (o.g.); Burić 72'	Report	Tojčić (yellow card) 4'; Đelmić (yellow card) 4'; Stanišić (yellow card) 69'	Stadium: Tušanj City Stadium; Attendance: 500; Referee: Mateo Musa

19 October 2019 13	Zvijezda 09	0 – 2	Borac	Ugljevik
15:00	Marković (yellow card) 56'; Benović (yellow card) 61'	Report	Ivan Crnov 35'; Milutinović (yellow card) 41'; Vranješ 62' (pen.); Radulović (yellow card) 66'	Stadium: Ugljevik City Stadium; Attendance: 450; Referee: Elvis Mujić

25 October 2019 14	Mladost Doboj Kakanj	1 – 0	Zvijezda 09	Kakanj
14:30	Biber (yellow card) 41'; Vazda 53'	Report	Marković (yellow card) 57'; Vojinović (yellow card) 79'	Stadium: MGM Farm Arena; Attendance: 200; Referee: Danijel Bojo

2 November 2019 15	Zvijezda 09	2 – 0	Zrinjski	Ugljevik
13:30	Đelmić 14' (yellow card) 39' (goal) 84'; Babić (yellow card) 49'; Predragović (yellow card) 51'	Report	Zlomislić (yellow card) 55'; Čurjurić (yellow card) 66'	Stadium: Ugljevik City Stadium; Attendance: 250; Referee: Admir Musić

9 November 2019 16	Čelik	2 – 1	Zvijezda 09	Zenica
13:30	Leon 27' 31'; Jamak (yellow card) 37'; Huseinbašić (yellow card) 52'; Okić (yellow card) 63'; Pecelj (yellow card) 65'; Salčinović (yellow card) 90'; Dedić (yellow card) 90'; Žuna (yellow card) 90'	Report	Đelmić 5' (yellow card) 90'; Mehmedagić (yellow card) 68'; Chagas (yellow card) 87'	Stadium: Bilino Polje Stadium; Attendance: 2,500; Referee: Admir Šehović

9 November 2019 17	Zvijezda 09	1 – 1	Sloboda Tuzla	Ugljevik
13:30	Marković (yellow card) 16'; Predragović 38'; Tojčić (yellow card) 54'; Babić (yellow card) 71'; Vojinović (yellow card) 84'	Report	Jusić (yellow card) 37'; Livančić (yellow card) 43'; Bekrić (yellow card) 48'; Mujagić (yellow card) 48'; Al. Bekić 58'; Smajić (yellow card) 90'	Stadium: Ugljevik City Stadium; Attendance: 500; Referee: Danijel Bojo

1 December 2019 18	Široki Brijeg	4 – 0	Zvijezda 09	Široki Brijeg
16:00	Ćorić 1' (yellow card) 45'; Angelov 7' 68'; Marić (yellow card) 26'; Hrkać (yellow card) 65'; Jurić 82'	Report	Milošević (yellow card) 53'; Mehmedagić (yellow card) 90'	Stadium: Stadion Pecara; Attendance: 500; Referee: Sabrija Topalović

7 December 2019 19	Zvijezda 09	1 – 1	Sarajevo	Ugljevik
13:00	Živković (yellow card) 23'; Chagas (yellow card) 26'; Đelmić 47' (yellow card) 59'; Manojlović (yellow card) 59'; Tojčić (yellow card) 83'; Milošević (yellow card) 87'; Babić (yellow card) 89'	Report	Oremuš (yellow card) 30'; Stanojević (yellow card) 69'; Ahmetović 77' (pen.); Dupovac (yellow card) 85'; Handžić (yellow card) 85'	Stadium: Ugljevik City Stadium; Attendance: 300; Referee: Zoran Grbić

22 February 2020 20	Velež	2 – 0	Zvijezda 09	Mostar
14:30	Brandao 23'; Čivić (yellow card) 24'; Fajić (yellow card) 45'; Vehabović 58'; Ovčina (yellow card) 63'	Report	Benović (yellow card) 12'; Popara (yellow card) 69'	Stadium: Stadion Rođeni; Attendance: 3,500; Referee: Frano Jelić

29 February 2020 21	Zvijezda 09	0 – 3	Željezničar	Ugljevik
14:30	Mandić (yellow card) 43'	Report	Janković 19' (o.g.); Sadiković (yellow card) 37'; Ramović 39'; Lendrić 57'; Bojo (yellow card) 67'	Stadium: Ugljevik City Stadium; Attendance: 400; Referee: Luka Bilbija

7 March 2020 22	Radnik Bijeljina	5 – 1	Zvijezda 09	Bijeljina
15:00		Report		Stadium: Gradski stadion

=== Kup BiH ===
==== Round of 32 ====
18 September 2019 First Round	Modriča	0 – 3	Zvijezda 09	Modriča
16:30		Report		Stadium: Stadion Dr. Milan Jelić

==== Round of 16 ====
2 October 2019 Second Round	Zvijezda 09	0 – 6	Borac	Ugljevik
15:30		Report		Stadium: Ugljevik City Stadium
