= 2025–26 First League of the Republika Srpska =

First League of the Republika Srpska
- Season: 2025–26
- Dates: 10 August 2025 – 3 June 2026
- Champions: BSK Banja Luka; 1st First League title
- Promoted: BSK Banja Luka
- Relegated: Vlasenica
- Matches: 192
- Goals: 483 (2.52 per match)
- Top goalscorer: Mahir Rahimić; Branko Rosić (15 goals each)

The 2025–26 First League of the Republika Srpska was the thirty-first season of the First League of the Republika Srpska, the second tier football league of Bosnia and Herzegovina, since its original establishment and the twenty-fourth as a second-tier league. The season began on 10 August 2025 and ended on 3 June 2026.

== Teams ==
Locations of the 2025–26 First League of RS teams

Team	Location
BSK	Banja Luka
Drina	Zvornik
Famos	Vojkovići
Kozara	Gradiška
Laktaši	Laktaši
Leotar	Trebinje
Omarska	Omarska
Romanija	Pale
Slavija	Istočno Sarajevo
Sutjeska	Foča
Velež	Nevesinje
Vlasenica	Vlasenica
Zvijezda 09	Ugljevik

== Regular season ==
Pos	Team	Pld	W	D	L	GF	GA	GD	Pts	Qualification
1	Laktaši	24	14	6	4	45	16	+29	48	Qualification for the Championship round
2	BSK Banja Luka	24	14	5	5	38	19	+19	47	Qualification for the Championship round
3	Leotar	24	12	10	2	37	15	+22	46	Qualification for the Championship round
4	Kozara	24	10	6	8	24	25	−1	36	Qualification for the Championship round
5	Slavija Sarajevo	24	9	8	7	28	23	+5	35	Qualification for the Championship round
6	Drina Zvornik	24	10	4	10	36	20	+16	34	Qualification for the Championship round
7	Zvijezda 09	24	8	6	10	23	31	−8	30	Qualification for the Relegation round
8	Sutjeska Foča	24	8	5	11	31	34	−3	29	Qualification for the Relegation round
9	Romanija Pale	24	8	4	12	24	31	−7	28	Qualification for the Relegation round
10	Velež Nevesinje	24	8	3	13	27	41	−14	27	Qualification for the Relegation round
11	Famos Vojkovići	24	7	6	11	22	40	−18	27	Qualification for the Relegation round
12	Omarska	24	7	4	13	25	48	−23	25	Qualification for the Relegation round
13	Vlasenica	24	4	7	13	14	31	−17	19	Qualification for the Relegation round

Source: SportDC
Rules for classification: 1) Points; 2) Head-to-head points; 3) Head-to-head goal difference; 4) Head-to-head goals scored; 5) Head-to-head away goals scored (only if two teams); 6) Goal difference; 7) Goals scored; 8) Play-off.

== Promotion round ==
Pos	Team	Pld	W	D	L	GF	GA	GD	Pts	Promotion
1	BSK Banja Luka (C, P)	29	17	6	6	46	26	+20	57	Promotion to the Premijer Liga BiH
2	Laktaši	29	16	8	5	52	20	+32	56	
3	Leotar	29	13	14	2	41	17	+24	53	
4	Drina Zvornik	29	11	7	11	43	27	+16	40	
5	Kozara	29	11	7	11	28	34	−6	40	
6	Slavija Sarajevo	29	10	9	10	33	29	+4	39	

Source: SportDC
Rules for classification: 1) Points; 2) Head-to-head points; 3) Head-to-head goal difference; 4) Head-to-head goals scored; 5) Head-to-head away goals scored (only if two teams); 6) Goal difference; 7) Goals scored; 8) Play-off.
(C) Champions; (P) Promoted

== Relegation round ==
Pos	Team	Pld	W	D	L	GF	GA	GD	Pts	Relegation
7	Zvijezda 09	30	12	7	11	40	37	+3	43	
8	Famos Vojkovići	30	11	7	12	33	45	−12	40	
9	Velež Nevesinje	30	12	3	15	45	57	−12	39	
10	Omarska	30	11	5	14	36	54	−18	38	
11	Sutjeska Foča	30	10	5	15	37	49	−12	35	
12	Romanija Pale	30	8	5	17	32	47	−15	29	
13	Vlasenica (R)	30	4	9	17	17	41	−24	21	Relegation to the Second League of RS

Source: SportDC
Rules for classification: 1) Points; 2) Head-to-head points; 3) Head-to-head goal difference; 4) Head-to-head goals scored; 5) Head-to-head away goals scored (only if two teams); 6) Goal difference; 7) Goals scored; 8) Play-off.
(R) Relegated

== See also ==
- 2025–26 Premier League of Bosnia and Herzegovina
- 2025–26 First League of the Federation of Bosnia and Herzegovina
- 2025–26 Bosnia and Herzegovina Football Cup
