= 2003–04 Bosnia and Herzegovina Football Cup =

Tournament details
- Country: Bosnia and Herzegovina
- Teams: 32

Final positions
- Champions: Modriča; 1st national cup title
- Runners-up: Borac

2003–04 Bosnia and Herzegovina Football Cup was the tenth season of the Bosnia and Herzegovina's annual football cup, and a fourth season of the unified competition. The competition started on 17 September 2003 with the First Round and concluded on 26 May 2004 with the Final.

== First round ==
Thirty-two teams entered in the First Round. The matches were played on 17 September 2003.

Team 1	Score	Team 2
Kiseljak	0–0 (3–4 p)	Modriča Maxima
Ljubuški	0–1	Čelik Zenica
Sloboda Novi Grad	1–0	Brotnjo
Bosna Kalesija	4–0	Široki Brijeg
Mladost Gacko	1–0	Posušje
Hajduk Orašje	0–0 (5–3 p)	Travnik
Olimpik	1–2	Borac Banja Luka
Finvest Drvar	2–0	Glasinac Sokolac
Velež	0–2	Rudar Ugljevik
Slavija	1–0	Zrinjski
Ljubić Prnjavor	0–0 (8–7 p)	Leotar
Podgrmeč Sanski Most	2–1	Sloboda Tuzla
Drinovci	2–1	Sarajevo
Jedinstvo Brčko	1–0	Žepče Limorad
Kozara Gradiška	2–0	Željezničar
Goražde	0–3 (f)	Orašje

== Second round ==
The 16 winners from the prior round enter this round. The first legs were played on 22 and 29 October and the second legs were played on 5 November 2003.

Team 1	Agg.	Team 2	1st leg	2nd leg
Borac Banja Luka	5–2	Rudar Ugljevik	2–0	3–2
Mladost Gacko	1–3	Slavija	1–2	0–1
Jedinstvo Brčko	2–2 (a)	Ljubić Prnjavor	1–0	1–2
Bosna Kalesija	2–7	Kozara Gradiška	0–2	2–5
Čelik Zenica	3–6	Modriča Maxima	3–1	0–5
Drinovci	2–2 (a)	Orašje	1–0	1–2
Finvest Drvar	1–4	Podgrmeč Sanski Most	0–0	1–4
Sloboda Novi Grad	2–1	Hajduk Orašje	1–0	1–1

== Quarterfinals ==
The eight winners from the prior round enter this round. The first legs were played on 19 November and the second legs were played on 22 and 29 November 2003.

Team 1	Agg.	Team 2	1st leg	2nd leg
Modriča Maxima	5–1	Jedinstvo Brčko	2–1	3–0
Kozara Gradiška	1–2	Borac Banja Luka	1–1	0–1
Podgrmeč Sanski Most	2–7	Slavija	1–5	1–2
Sloboda Novi Grad	3–5	Drinovci	2–0	1–5

== Semifinals ==
The four winners from the prior round enter this round. The first legs will be played on 17 March and the second legs were played on 17 April 2004.

Team 1	Agg.	Team 2	1st leg	2nd leg
Slavija	0–1	Borac Banja Luka	0–1	0–0
Modriča Maxima	2–0	Drinovci	1–0	1–0

== Final ==
26 May 2004

Borac Banja Luka	1–1	Modriča Maxima
Đurić 40'	Report	Novaković 72'
Penalties
Đukić (penalty missed); Maksimović (penalty scored); Jandrić (penalty missed); Karalić (penalty scored)	2–4	(penalty missed) Novaković; (penalty scored) Magazin; (penalty scored) Jolović; (penalty scored) Railić; (penalty scored) Damjanović

Stadion Koševo, Sarajevo
Attendance: 400
Referee: Siniša Zrnić (Zenica)

== See also ==
- 2003–04 Premier League of Bosnia and Herzegovina
