= Papažani =

- Village
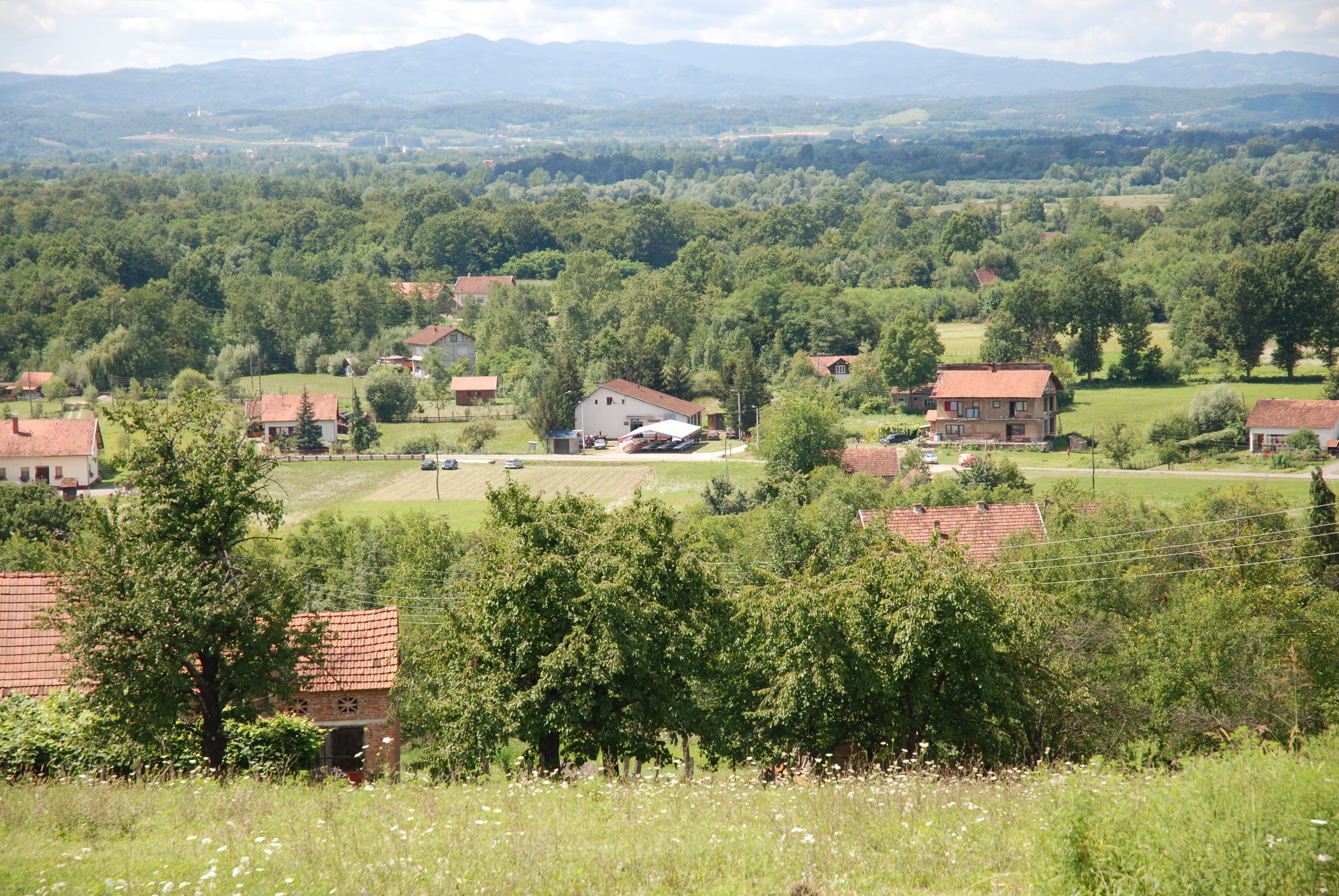

- Location within Bosnia and Herzegovina
- Coordinates: 44°55′24.96″N 17°23′38.04″E
- Country: Bosnia and Herzegovina
- Entity: Republika Srpska
- Municipality: Laktaši
- Time zone: UTC+1 (CET)

Papažani (Serbian Cyrillic: Папажани) is a village in the municipality of Laktaši, Republika Srpska, Bosnia and Herzegovina.

== Demographics ==
Papažani
year of census	1991
Serbs	418 (89.13%)
Croats	1 (0.21%)
Muslims	0
Yugoslavs	26 (5.54%)
other	24 (5.12%)
total	469
