= Danijel Majkić =

Bosnian footballer (born 1987)

Personal information
- Date of birth: 16 December 1987 (age 38)
- Place of birth: Banja Luka, SFR Yugoslavia
- Height: 1.84 m (6 ft 0 in)
- Position: Midfielder

Youth career
- Lijevče Nova Topola
- Proleter Teslić
- 2007–2008: Velež Mostar

Senior career*
| Years | Team | Apps | (Gls) |
| 2008–2010 | Velež Mostar | 32 | (2) |
| 2010 | Krylia Sovetov Samara | 0 | (0) |
| 2011 | Baltika Kaliningrad | 14 | (0) |
| 2012 | Shakhter Karagandy | 6 | (0) |
| 2013 | Velež Mostar | 28 | (4) |
| 2014 | Leotar Trebinje | 11 | (0) |
| 2014–2015 | Al-Ahly Benghazi | | |
| 2015–2016 | ViOn Zlaté Moravce | 29 | (1) |
| 2017 | Željezničar Banja Luka | | |
| 2017 | Sandviken | 9 | (0) |
| 2018 | Borac Banja Luka | 11 | (0) |
| 2018–2019 | Platanias | 20 | (0) |
| 2020–2022 | UMF Selfoss | 37 | (0) |

International career
| | Bosnia and Herzegovina U21 | 3 | (1) |

Managerial career
- 2023: Željezničar Banja Luka
- * Club domestic league appearances and goals as of 1 January 2023

Danijel Majkić (Serbian Cyrillic: Данијел Мајкић; born 16 December 1987) is a Bosnian retired professional footballer who played as a midfielder.

== Club career ==
Majkić was born in Banja Luka, SR Bosnia and Herzegovina, Yugoslavia. On 17 June 2010, he signed for Krylia Sovetov Samara from Velež Mostar of the Premier League of Bosnia and Herzegovina.
