= Šeškovci =

- Village
- Location within Bosnia and Herzegovina
- Coordinates: 44°57′54″N 17°26′4″E
- Country: Bosnia and Herzegovina
- Entity: Republika Srpska
- Municipality: Laktaši
- Elevation: 377 ft (115 m)

Population (1991)
  - Total: 412
- Time zone: UTC+1 (CET)

Šeškovci (Serbian Cyrillic: Шешковци) is a village in the municipality of Laktaši, Republika Srpska, Bosnia and Herzegovina.
