= 2021–22 First League of the Republika Srpska =

First League of the Republika Srpska
- Season: 2021–22
- Dates: 13 August 2021 – 28 May 2022
- Champions: Krupa; 3rd First League title
- Promoted: Sloga Doboj
- Relegated: Budućnost Pilica
- Matches played: 240
- Goals scored: 690 (2.88 per match)
- Top goalscorer: Aleksandar Žižak (20 goals)

The 2021–22 First League of the Republika Srpska was the twenty-seventh season of the First League of the Republika Srpska, the second tier football league of Bosnia and Herzegovina, since its original establishment and the twentieth as a second-tier league. The season began on 13 August 2021 and ended on 28 May 2022.

== Teams ==
- Borac Kozarska Dubica
- Budućnost Pilica
- Drina Zvornik
- Kozara Gradiška
- Krupa
- Ljubić Prnjavor
- Modriča
- Omarska
- Podrinje Janja
- Slavija Sarajevo
- Sloboda Novi Grad
- Sloga Doboj
- Sutjeska Foča
- Tekstilac Derventa
- Zvijezda 09
- Željezničar Banja Luka

== League table ==
Pos	Team	Pld	W	D	L	GF	GA	GD	Pts	Promotion or relegation
1	Krupa (Note: Krupa were prevented from promotion to the Premier League due to failing to obtain a license for it.) (C)	30	24	4	2	73	16	+57	75 (Note: Krupa were deducted 1 point due to their youth team not playing in the national division.)	
2	Sloga Doboj (Note: Sloga Doboj were given a license to compete in the Premier League and were selected as Krupa's replacement.) (P)	30	21	5	4	67	20	+47	68	Promotion to the Premijer Liga BiH
3	Sloboda Novi Grad	30	20	5	5	52	16	+36	65	
4	Zvijezda 09	30	18	4	8	61	30	+31	58	
5	Sutjeska Foča	30	17	4	9	59	39	+20	55	
6	Drina Zvornik	30	15	5	10	49	36	+13	50	
7	Slavija	30	13	4	13	40	41	−1	43	
8	Omarska	30	11	6	13	34	41	−7	39	
9	Ljubić Prnjavor	30	12	2	16	52	57	−5	38	
10	Tekstilac Derventa	30	10	7	13	25	34	−9	37	
11	Željezničar Banja Luka	30	9	6	15	40	47	−7	33	
12	Modriča	30	9	4	17	33	63	−30	31	
13	Kozara	30	8	5	17	36	47	−11	29	
14	Podrinje Janja	30	8	3	19	27	57	−30	27	
15	Borac Kozarska Dubica (R)	30	8	3	19	22	51	−29	24 (Note: Borac Kozarska Dubica were deducted 3 points.)	Relegation to the Second League of RS
16	Budućnost Pilica (R)	30	3	1	26	20	95	−75	10	Relegation to the Second League of RS

Source: rezultati.com
Rules for classification: 1) Points; 2) Head-to-head points; 3) Head-to-head goal difference; 4) Head-to-head goals scored; 5) Head-to-head away goals scored (only if two teams); 6) Goal difference; 7) Goals scored; 8) Play-off.
(C) Champions; (P) Promoted; (R) Relegated

== See also ==
- 2021–22 Premier League of Bosnia and Herzegovina
- 2021–22 First League of the Federation of Bosnia and Herzegovina
- 2021–22 Bosnia and Herzegovina Football Cup
