= 2024–25 First League of the Republika Srpska =

First League of the Republika Srpska
- Season: 2024–25
- Dates: 10 August 2024 – 31 May 2025
- Champions: Laktaši; 2nd First League title
- Promoted: Rudar (P)
- Relegated: Drina HE; Željezničar (BL); Ljubić; Sloboda (MG); Borac (KD)
- Matches: 306
- Goals: 842 (2.75 per match)
- Top goalscorer: Milan Šikanjić (37 goals)

The 2024–25 First League of the Republika Srpska was the thirtieth season of the First League of the Republika Srpska, the second tier football league of Bosnia and Herzegovina, since its original establishment and the twenty-third as a second-tier league. The season began on 10 August 2024 and ended on 31 May 2025.

== Teams ==
- Borac Kozarska Dubica
- BSK Banja Luka
- Drina HE Višegrad
- Drina Zvornik
- Famos Vojkovići
- Kozara Gradiška
- Laktaši
- Leotar
- Ljubić Prnjavor
- Romanija Pale
- Rudar Prijedor
- Slavija Sarajevo
- Sloboda Mrkonjić Grad
- Sloboda Novi Grad
- Sutjeska Foča
- Velež Nevesinje
- Željezničar Banja Luka
- Zvijezda 09

== League table ==
Pos	Team	Pld	W	D	L	GF	GA	GD	Pts	Promotion or relegation
1	Laktaši (Note: Laktaši were prevented from promotion to the Premier League due to failing to obtain a license for it.) (C)	34	26	3	5	90	24	+66	81	
2	BSK Banja Luka	34	22	5	7	67	39	+28	71	
3	Rudar Prijedor (Note: Rudar Prijedor were given a license to compete in the Premier League and were selected as Laktaši's replacement.) (P)	34	20	6	8	50	21	+29	66	Promotion to the Premijer Liga BIH
4	Zvijezda 09	34	18	6	10	46	34	+12	60	
5	Sloboda Novi Grad	34	15	7	12	43	38	+5	49 (Note: Sloboda Novi Grad and Borac Kozarska Dubica were deducted 3 points.)	
6	Slavija	34	13	8	13	53	42	+11	47	
7	Famos Vojkovići	34	13	7	14	40	35	+5	46	
8	Sutjeska Foča	34	14	4	16	42	55	−13	46	
9	Leotar	34	12	9	13	42	29	+13	45	
10	Drina Zvornik	34	13	5	16	38	42	−4	44	
11	Romanija Pale	34	11	11	12	36	32	+4	44	
12	Velež Nevesinje	34	12	6	16	38	58	−20	42	
13	Kozara	34	11	9	14	38	47	−9	42	
14	Drina HE Višegrad (R)	34	13	3	18	37	59	−22	42	Relegation to the Second League RS
15	Željezničar Banja Luka (R)	34	12	5	17	46	52	−6	41	Relegation to the Second League RS
16	Ljubić Prnjavor (R)	34	11	7	16	39	62	−23	40	Relegation to the Second League RS
17	Sloboda Mrkonjić Grad (R)	34	9	7	18	44	61	−17	34	Relegation to the Second League RS
18	Borac Kozarska Dubica (R)	34	5	4	25	29	88	−59	16	Relegation to the Second League RS

Source: SportDC
Rules for classification: 1) Points; 2) Head-to-head points; 3) Head-to-head goal difference; 4) Head-to-head goals scored; 5) Head-to-head away goals scored (only if two teams); 6) Goal difference; 7) Goals scored; 8) Play-off.
(C) Champions; (P) Promoted; (R) Relegated

== See also ==
- 2024–25 Premier League of Bosnia and Herzegovina
- 2024–25 First League of the Federation of Bosnia and Herzegovina
- 2024–25 Bosnia and Herzegovina Football Cup
