= Nemanja Janičić =

Bosnian professional footballer (born 1986)

Personal information
- Date of birth: 13 July 1986 (age 40)
- Place of birth: Banja Luka, SFR Yugoslavia
- Height: 1.93 m (6 ft 4 in)
- Position: Centre-back

Youth career
- Borac Banja Luka

Senior career*
Years	Team	Apps	(Gls)
2004–2011	Mogren	97	(2)
2011	Bežanija	14	(0)
2012–2014	Napredak Kruševac	70	(2)
2015–2016	Lokomotiv Tashkent	40	(0)
2017	Borac Čačak	10	(0)
2017–2018	Borac Banja Luka	28	(0)
2018	Luftëtari	14	(0)
2019–2020	Borac Banja Luka	26	(0)
2021	Kozara Gradiška	8	(0)
2022	BSK Banja Luka		
Total		367	(4)
- * Club domestic league appearances and goals

Nemanja Janičić (Serbian Cyrillic: Немања Јаничић, born 13 July 1986) is a Bosnian former professional footballer who played as a centre-back.

== Club career ==
Born in Banja Luka, SFR Yugoslavia, present day Bosnia and Herzegovina Janičić started playing as a senior with Mogren in the 2004–05 Second League of Serbia and Montenegro season. He played with Mogren a total of 7 seasons, until 2011, having played the last five already with Mogren competing in the separate Montenegrin First League.

After winning the Montenegrin championship for the second time, in the summer of 2011, Janičić moved to Serbia and joined First League side Bežanija, but after only 6 months, during the 2011–12 winter break, he moved to Napredak Kruševac. In the 2012–13 Serbian First League season, Napredak finished top, and thus won promotion to the Serbian SuperLiga.

After Napredak, Janičić played for Lokomotiv Tashkent in Uzbekistan from 2015 to 2017 where he won the Uzbekistan Super League once, the Uzbekistan Cup once and the Uzbekistan Super Cup once. He left Lokomotiv Tashkent for Borac Čačak and then he played for hometown club Borac Banja Luka and Luftëtari.

In January 2019, Janičić came back to Borac. In the 2018–19 First league of RS season, with Borac, he won the league title and got promoted back to the Bosnian Premier League. He fell out with coach Vlado Jagodić in September 2020 and was suspended by the club for two matches.

== Career statistics ==
Appearances and goals by club, season and competition
Club	Season	League			National cup (Note: Includes Azerbaijan Cup, King Cup, Uzbekistan Cup)		Continental		Other		Total	
Club	Season	Division	Apps	Goals	Apps	Goals	Apps	Goals	Apps	Goals	Apps	Goals
Bežanija	2011–12	Serbian First League	14	0	0	0	—		—		14	0
Napredak Kruševac	2011–12	Serbian First League	13	0	0	0	—		—		13	0
Napredak Kruševac	2012–13	Serbian First League	23	0	0	0	—		—		23	0
Napredak Kruševac	2013–14	Serbian SuperLiga	24	0	2	0	—		—		26	0
Napredak Kruševac	2014–15	Serbian SuperLiga	10	2	1	0	—		—		11	2
Napredak Kruševac	Total		70	2	3	0	—		—		73	2
Lokomotiv Tashkent	2015	Uzbek League	25	0	6	0	6	0	1	0	38	0
Lokomotiv Tashkent	2016	Uzbek League	15	0	2	0	5	0	—		22	0
Lokomotiv Tashkent	Total		40	0	8	0	11	0	1	0	60	0
Borac Čačak	2016–17	Serbian SuperLiga	10	0	—		—		—		10	0
Borac Banja Luka	2017–18	Bosnian Premier League	28	0	1	0	—		—		29	0
Luftëtari	2018–19	Kategoria Superiore	14	0	0	0	2	0	—		16	0
Borac Banja Luka	2018–19	Bosnian Premier League	9	0	1	0	—		—		10	0
Borac Banja Luka	2019–20	Bosnian Premier League	15	0	2	0	—		—		17	0
Borac Banja Luka	2020–21	Bosnian Premier League	2	0	0	0	1	0	—		3	0
Borac Banja Luka	Total		26	0	3	0	1	0	—		30	0
Kozara Gradiška	2021–22	First League of RS	8	0	0	0	—		—		8	0
BSK Banja Luka	2021–22	First League of RS					—		—			
Career total			270	2	15	0	14	0	1	0	300	2

== Honours ==
Mogren

- Montenegrin First League: 2008–09, 2010–11
- Montenegrin Cup: 2008

Napredak Kruševac

- Serbian First League: 2012–13

Lokomotiv Tashkent

- Uzbekistan Super League: 2016
- Uzbekistan Cup: 2016
- Uzbekistan Super Cup: 2015

Borac Banja Luka

- First League of RS: 2018–19
