= Nedeljko Jurić =

Bosnian footballer

Personal information
- Full name: Nedeljko Jurić
- Date of birth: 18 July 1978 (age 48)
- Place of birth: SFR Yugoslavia
- Position: Striker

Senior career*
Years	Team	Apps	(Gls)
2000-2003	Zrinjski	82	(17)
2003-2006	Drinovci		
2006-2011	GOŠK Gabela		
2011–2012	Turbina Jablanica		
2013	USV Eichgraben	11	(1)

International career^{‡}
2001	Bosnia and Herzegovina	1	(0)
2001	Bosnia and Herzegovina XI	1	(0)
- * Club domestic league appearances and goals ‡ National team caps and goals as of 19 June 2021

Nedeljko Jurić (born 18 July 1978) is a Bosnian retired football player.

== Club career ==
Jurić joined second tier Drinovci from top-level side Zrinjski in 2003. He left Bosnia and Herzegovina in 2013 to play for Austrian amateur side USV Eichgraben.

== International career ==
He made two appearances for Bosnia and Herzegovina at the August 2001 LG Cup, an unofficial match against South Africa and an official international match against Iran.
