= 2019–20 First League of the Republika Srpska =

First League of the Republika Srpska
- Season: 2019–20
- Champions: Krupa; 2nd First League title
- Promoted: Krupa
- Relegated: Sloga Gornje Crnjelovo (withdrew)
- Matches played: 60
- Goals scored: 144 (2.4 per match)
- Top goalscorer: Jovo Lukić (12 goals)
- Biggest home win: Željezničar Banja Luka 10–0 Sloga Gornje Crnjelovo (17 August 2019)
- Biggest away win: Sloga Gornje Crnjelovo 0–8 Tekstilac Derventa (10 August 2019)
- Highest scoring: Željezničar Banja Luka 10–0 Sloga Gornje Crnjelovo (17 August 2019); Krupa 7–3 Podrinje Janja (7 September 2019)
- Longest winning run: 9 matches Krupa
- Longest unbeaten run: 14 matches Krupa
- Longest winless run: 7 matches Jedinstvo Brčko
- Longest losing run: 4 matches Tekstilac Derventa; Slavija Sarajevo

The 2019–20 First League of the Republika Srpska was the twenty-fifth season of the First League of the Republika Srpska, the second tier football league of Bosnia and Herzegovina, since its original establishment and the eighteenth as a second tier league. The season began on 10 August 2019 and ended abruptly on 8 May 2020 due to the COVID-19 pandemic in Bosnia and Herzegovina, with Krupa getting promoted to the Premier League of Bosnia and Herzegovina and no one getting relegated.

Earlier in the season, Sloga Gornje Crnjelovo withdrew from the league after only two rounds.

== Teams ==
- FK Jedinstvo Brčko
- FK Kozara Gradiška
- FK Krupa
- FK Modriča
- FK Podrinje Janja
- FK Rudar Prijedor
- FK Slavija Sarajevo
- OFK Sloga Gornje Crnjelovo
- FK Tekstilac Derventa
- FK Željezničar Banja Luka

== League table ==
Pos	Team	Pld	W	D	L	GF	GA	GD	Pts	Promotion or relegation
1	Krupa (C, P)	14	12	2	0	34	6	+28	38	Promotion to the Premijer Liga BiH
2	Rudar Prijedor	14	8	3	3	20	7	+13	27	
3	Kozara	14	6	4	4	15	16	−1	22	
4	Željezničar Banja Luka	13	4	4	5	10	12	−2	16	
5	Modriča	13	4	2	7	15	15	0	14	
6	Slavija	13	2	7	4	14	20	−6	13	
7	Tekstilac Derventa	13	3	4	6	14	20	−6	13	
8	Podrinje Janja	13	3	4	6	10	20	−10	13	
9	Jedinstvo Brčko	13	2	2	9	12	28	−16	8	
10	Sloga Gornje Crnjelovo (Note: Sloga Gornje Crnjelovo withdrew from the league because of disagreements with the Football Association of Republika Srpska.) (R)	0	0	0	0	0	0	0	0	Relegation to the Second League of RS

Source: Soccerway
Rules for classification: 1) Points; 2) Head-to-head points; 3) Head-to-head goal difference; 4) Head-to-head goals scored; 5) Head-to-head away goals scored (only if two teams); 6) Goal difference; 7) Goals scored; 8) Play-off.
(C) Champions; (P) Promoted; (R) Relegated

== See also ==
- 2019–20 Premier League of Bosnia and Herzegovina
- 2019–20 First League of the Federation of Bosnia and Herzegovina
- 2019–20 Bosnia and Herzegovina Football Cup
