= Vladan Danilović =

Bosnian footballer (born 1999)

Personal information
- Date of birth: 27 July 1999 (age 27)
- Place of birth: Foča, Bosnia and Herzegovina
- Height: 1.83 m (6 ft 0 in)
- Position: Defensive midfielder

Team information
- Current team: Marítimo
- Number: 18

Youth career
- Sutjeska Foča

Senior career*
| Years | Team | Apps | (Gls) |
| 2015–2016 | Sutjeska Foča | 16 | (0) |
| 2016–2020 | Borac Banja Luka | 100 | (9) |
| 2020–2024 | Nacional | 95 | (10) |
| 2024– | Marítimo | 68 | (1) |

International career
| 2017 | Bosnia and Herzegovina U19 | 4 | (0) |
| 2018–2019 | Bosnia and Herzegovina U21 | 7 | (0) |
| 2020–2022 | Bosnia and Herzegovina | 7 | (0) |
- * Club domestic league appearances and goals as of 19 September 2026

Vladan Danilović (pronounced [ʋlǎdan danîːloʋitɕ]; born 27 July 1999) is a Bosnian professional footballer who plays as a defensive midfielder for Primeira Liga club Marítimo.

Danilović started his professional career at Sutjeska Foča, before joining Borac Banja Luka in 2016. Four years later, he moved to Nacional. In 2024, he switched to Marítimo.

A former youth international for Bosnia and Herzegovina, Danilović made his senior international debut in 2020, earning 7 caps until 2022.

== Club career ==
=== Early career ===
Danilović came through the youth setup of his hometown club Sutjeska Foča. He made his professional debut against Drina Višegrad on 22 August 2015 at the age of 16.

In June 2016, he joined Borac Banja Luka. On 11 March 2017, he scored his first professional goal against Tekstilac, which secured the victory for his team.

In October 2020, Danilović signed with Portuguese side Nacional.

In August 2024, he moved to Marítimo.

== International career ==
Danilović represented Bosnia and Herzegovina at various youth levels.

In August 2020, he received his first senior call up, for 2020–21 UEFA Nations League A games against Italy and Poland, but had to wait until 15 November to make his debut against the Netherlands.

== Career statistics ==
=== Club ===
As of match played 21 November 2026

Appearances and goals by club, season and competition
| Club | Season | League | | | National cup (Note: Includes Bosnian Cup, Taça de Portugal) | | League cup (Note: Includes Taça da Liga) | | Continental | | Total | |
| Club | Season | Division | Apps | Goals | Apps | Goals | Apps | Goals | Apps | Goals | Apps | Goals |
|---|---|---|---|---|---|---|---|---|---|---|---|---|
| Sutjeska Foča | 2015–16 | First League of the RS | 16 | 0 | – | | – | | – | | 16 | 0 |
| Borac Banja Luka | 2016–17 | First League of the RS | 21 | 2 | 1 | 0 | – | | – | | 22 | 2 |
| Borac Banja Luka | 2017–18 | Bosnian Premier League | 29 | 1 | 1 | 0 | – | | – | | 30 | 1 |
| Borac Banja Luka | 2018–19 | First League of the RS | 23 | 4 | 4 | 1 | – | | – | | 27 | 5 |
| Borac Banja Luka | 2019–20 | Bosnian Premier League | 20 | 0 | 2 | 0 | – | | – | | 22 | 0 |
| Borac Banja Luka | 2020–21 | Bosnian Premier League | 7 | 2 | 0 | 0 | – | | 2 (Note: Appearances in UEFA Europa League) | 0 | 9 | 2 |
| Borac Banja Luka | Total | | 100 | 9 | 8 | 1 | – | | 2 | 0 | 110 | 10 |
| Nacional | 2020–21 | Primeira Liga | 8 | 0 | 2 | 0 | – | | – | | 10 | 0 |
| Nacional | 2021–22 | Liga Portugal 2 | 30 | 1 | 2 | 0 | 0 | 0 | – | | 32 | 1 |
| Nacional | 2022–23 | Liga Portugal 2 | 26 | 3 | 6 | 2 | 3 | 0 | – | | 35 | 5 |
| Nacional | 2023–24 | Liga Portugal 2 | 31 | 6 | 2 | 0 | 1 | 0 | – | | 34 | 6 |
| Nacional | Total | | 95 | 10 | 12 | 2 | 4 | 0 | – | | 111 | 12 |
| Marítimo | 2024–25 | Liga Portugal 2 | 30 | 0 | 1 | 0 | – | | – | | 31 | 0 |
| Marítimo | 2025–26 | Liga Portugal 2 | 31 | 1 | 1 | 0 | – | | – | | 32 | 1 |
| Marítimo | 2026–27 | Primeira Liga | 7 | 0 | 1 | 0 | 0 | 0 | – | | 8 | 0 |
| Marítimo | Total | | 68 | 1 | 3 | 0 | 0 | 0 | – | | 71 | 1 |
| Career total | | | 279 | 20 | 23 | 3 | 4 | 0 | 2 | 0 | 308 | 23 |

=== International ===
Appearances and goals by national team and year
| National team | Year | Apps | Goals |
|---|---|---|---|
Bosnia and Herzegovina
| Bosnia and Herzegovina | 2020 | 2 | 0 |
| Bosnia and Herzegovina | 2021 | 2 | 0 |
| Bosnia and Herzegovina | 2022 | 3 | 0 |
| Total | | 7 | 0 |

== Honours ==
Borac Banja Luka

- First League of the RS: 2016–17, 2018–19

Marítimo

- Liga Portugal 2: 2025–26
