= Badara Badji =

Senegalese footballer

Personal information
- Full name: Badara Badji
- Date of birth: 24 February 1994 (age 32)
- Place of birth: Dakar, Senegal
- Height: 1.92 m (6 ft 4 in)
- Position: Forward

Youth career
- –2013: Académie Mawade Wade

Senior career*
Years	Team	Apps	(Gls)
2013–2014	ASC Yeggo		
2014–2016	Dinamo Zagreb B	53	(25)
2014–2016	Dinamo Zagreb	0	(0)
2016	Delhi Dynamos	12	(2)
2018	Mladost Lučani	11	(1)
2018–2019	Inđija	27	(8)
2019	Zvijezda 09	16	(0)
2020–2021	Tuzla City	27	(4)
2021	Mornar	7	(1)
2022	Inđija	11	(2)

International career
- Senegal U20
- Senegal U23
2013	Senegal	2	(0)
- * Club domestic league appearances and goals

Badara Badji (born 24 February 1994) is a Senegalese professional footballer who last played for Inđija.

He had stints with ASC Yeggo, Dinamo Zagreb B, Odisha, Mladost Lučani, Inđija, Zvijezda 09 and Tuzla City, and has also represented the Senegal national team.

== Club career ==
=== Early career ===
Badji was born in Dakar, Senegal. He played in his home country with ASC Yeggo in the 2013 and 2013–14 Senegal Premier League. He came to Yeggo from the Académie Mawade Wade.

While playing with Yeggo, he was selected to be part of the Senegal national U20 team at the 2013 Jeux de la Francophonie

=== Dinamo Zagreb ===
In the summer of 2014, Badji joined Croatian powerhouse Dinamo Zagreb on a two-year loan spell. He had also made appearances for the Senegal national team by the time he joined Dinamo.

He was a regular and a prolific scorer for the Dinamo Zagreb B team during the two seasons he spent there, the first one playing in the 2014–15 3. HNL and next in the 2015–16 2. HNL.

Badji has also made a solitary appearance for the Dinamo Zagreb main team, in a 2015–16 Croatian Cup first-round game against Oštrc Zlatar.

=== Delhi Dynamos ===
Badji signed for Delhi Dynamos FC, 15 days before the start of the season to pair up with Richard Gadze and Marcelinho on the Odisha frontline.

=== Mladost Lučani ===
On 21 January 2018, Badji signed with Serbian top-flight side Mladost Lučani.

=== Inđija ===
Following summer, he moved to FK Inđija and played with them the 2018–19 Serbian First League season.

=== Zvijezda 09 ===
In July 2019, Badji signed a contract with Bosnian Premier League club Zvijezda 09. He made his debut for Zvijezda 09 on 20 July 2019, in a 1–5 home league loss against Tuzla City.

=== Tuzla City ===
On 11 January 2020, Badji left Zvijezda 09 and then signed a two-and-a-half-year contract with another Bosnian Premier League club, Tuzla City. He made his official debut for Tuzla City on 22 February 2020, in a 6–2 home loss against Sarajevo, a game in which Badji earned a direct red card in the 42nd minute of the game. He left Tuzla City in June 2021.

== International career ==
Badji made 3 appearances having scored 2 goals for the Senegal national U20 team. He then made 7 appearances having scored 3 goals for the U23 national team.

Badji also made 2 appearances for the main Senegal national team in 2013.

== Honours ==
Dinamo Zagreb

- 1. HNL: 2015–16
- Croatian Cup: 2015–16
