= Ognjen Đelmić =

Bosnian footballer (born 1988)

Personal information
- Full name: Ognjen Đelmić
- Date of birth: 18 August 1988 (age 38)
- Place of birth: Zenica, SR Bosnia and Herzegovina, SFR Yugoslavia
- Height: 1.72 m (5 ft 7 1/2 in)
- Position: Midfielder

Senior career*
Years	Team	Apps	(Gls)
2006–2009	Rad	14	(1)
2008	→ Železničar Beograd (loan)	12	(0)
2008–2009	→ Loznica (loan)	24	(7)
2009–2010	Laktaši	25	(1)
2010	Drina Zvornik	14	(2)
2011–2012	Zvijezda Gradačac	38	(8)
2012–2013	Olimpik	30	(3)
2013–2014	Borac Banja Luka	18	(7)
2014	Spartak Semey	2	(0)
2014	Čelik Zenica	8	(1)
2015	Željezničar	30	(7)
2016–2017	Debrecen	16	(0)
2017	Vojvodina	1	(0)
2018	Čelik Zenica	11	(2)
2018–2019	Radnik Bijeljina	23	(1)
2019–2020	Zvijezda 09	21	(5)

International career
2006	Bosnia and Herzegovina U19	3	(0)
- * Club domestic league appearances and goals as of 7 March 2020

Ognjen Đelmić (Serbian Cyrillic: Огњен Ђелмић; born 18 August 1988) is a Bosnian professional footballer who plays as a midfielder.

== Club career ==
Born in Zenica, SR Bosnia and Herzegovina, back then still within Yugoslavia, Đelmić started his senior career in the Serbian capital Belgrade where he was among the talented youngsters FK Rad were introducing to their first-team.

He played with Rad in the Serbian First League. In order to get more time in the field he was loaned to FK Železničar Beograd during the second half of the 2007–08 season, and played with FK Loznica in the 2008–09 season.

In the summer of 2009, Đelmić returned to Bosnia and started a period of five years of playing in the Premier League of Bosnia and Herzegovina with fK Laktaši, FK Drina Zvornik, NK Zvijezda Gradačac, FK Olimpik and FK Borac Banja Luka. In 2014, he signed with FC Spartak Semey and played in the 2014 Kazakhstan Premier League, but the stay there only lasted half-season and next he was back in the Bosnian Premiership playing with NK Čelik Zenica and FK Željezničar Sarajevo the following two seasons.

In the winter-break of the 2015–16 season he signed with Hungarian Nemzeti Bajnokság I side Debreceni VSC. On the last day of 2017 summer transfer window, Đelmić signed one-year-deal with Serbian club Vojvodina.

After Vojvodina, he returned to Čelik and played for the club between January and May 2018. In June 2018, Đelmić signed a two-year deal with FK Radnik Bijeljina. He scored his first goal for Radnik on 22 July 2018 in his debut match, in a 1–0 home win against FK Sarajevo in the first match of the 2018–19 Bosnian Premier League season.

Even though not a significant one, Đelmić won his first trophy, not only with Radnik, but in his entire career on 30 May 2019, the Republika Srpska Cup, after Radnik beat FK Krupa 3–1 in the final. He decided to leave Radnik on 30 June 2019, one year before the expiration of his contract.

Only hours after leaving Radnik, Đelmić went to another Bosnian Premier League club, FK Zvijezda 09, with whom he signed a two-year contract. He made his debut for Zvijezda 09 on 20 July 2019, in a 1–5 home league loss against FK Tuzla City. Đelmić scored his first goal for Zvijezda on 3 August 2019, in a 1–1 home league draw against FK Mladost Doboj Kakanj. He left Zvijezda 09 in July 2020.

== International career ==
Đelmić played for the Bosnia and Herzegovina U19 national team between 2006 and 2007. In that period he made 3 caps for the team, but did not score a goal.

== Honours ==
Željezničar

- Bosnian Premier League runner-up: 2014–15

Radnik Bijeljina

- Republika Srpska Cup: 2018–19
