= League of West Herzegovina Canton =

Bosnia and Herzegovina football league

League of West Herzegovina Canton (Bosnian: Međužupanijska liga HBŽ/ZHŽ) is a fourth level league in the Bosnia and Herzegovina football league system. The league champion is promoted to the Second League of the Federation of Bosnia and Herzegovina - South.

== Member clubs ==
List of clubs competing in 2020–21 season:

- HNK Drinovci
- HNK Junak Srđevići
- HNK Kupres '97
- HNK Mesihovina
- NK Rakitno
- NK Šujica
- NK Šator Glamoč
