= Aleksandar Railić =

Bosnian footballer (born 1979)

Personal information
- Date of birth: 22 October 1979 (age 47)
- Place of birth: Derventa, SFR Yugoslavia
- Height: 1.79 m (5 ft 10 in)
- Position: Midfielder

Senior career*
Years	Team	Apps	(Gls)
1997–2000	Tekstilac Derventa		
2000–	Polet Bosanski Brod		
–2004	Ljubić Prnjavor		
2004–2005	Modriča	27	(1)
2005	Željezničar Sarajevo	7	(0)
2006	Radnik Bijeljina	11	(1)
2006–2007	Modriča	23	(0)
2007	Livar	7	(0)
2008	Krško		
2008	Velež Mostar	12	(0)
2009	Krajina Cazin		
2009	Borac Banja Luka		
2010–2011	Sloga Doboj		
2011–2012	Crvena Zemlja		
2012–2014	Ljubić Prnjavor		
- * Club domestic league appearances and goals

Aleksandar Railić (Serbian Cyrillic: Александар Раилић; born 22 October 1979) is a Bosnian-Herzegovinian former professional footballer who played as a midfielder.

== Club career ==
Born in Derventa, SFR Yugoslavia, now Bosnia and Herzegovina, his first club was Tekstilac Derventa. Since the 2000–01 season Aleksandar Railić has played for FK Željezničar Sarajevo and from 2007 Livar in Slovenian First League.

He signed a contract with Livar for the 2007–08 season. In summer 2008 he considered joining Sloboda. He also played for Velež Mostar in the Bosnian Premier League.
