= OFK Sloga Gornje Crnjelovo =

Sloga Gornje Crnjelovo
- Full name: Omladinski fudbalski klub Sloga Gornje Crnjelovo
- Short name: Sloga
- Founded: 1961; 65 years ago
- Ground: Gradski stadion
- Capacity: 3,540
- President: Zlatko Krbanjević
- League: Second League of RS (East)
- 2019–20: First League of RS, 10th (withdrew)
Home colours	Away colours

Omladinski fudbalski klub Sloga Gornje Crnjelovo (English: Youth Football Club Sloga Gornje Crnjelovo) is a professional football club, based in Crnjelovo Gornje, Bosnia and Herzegovina.

The club was founded in 1961 and plays its home matches at the Gradski stadion in Crnjelovo Gornje, with a capacity of 3,540 seats. Sloga Gornje Crnjelovo currently compete in the Second League of RS (Group East).

== History ==
Sloga Gornje Crnjelovo made its second division debut in the 2018–19 season. This capped a meteoric rise, as Sloga played in the sixth division in 2014, receiving four consecutive promotions and obtaining a goal difference of 83:8 in the 2017–18 season.

Sloga finished second in the First League of RS in the 2018–19 season, 20 points behind the champions Borac Banja Luka. They also made the semi-finals of the 2018–19 Bosnian cup that season, where they got eliminated by Sarajevo. The team was managed by Dragan Mićić.

However, the club withdrew from the First League of RS in the 2019–20 season. Issues arose in the summer when the club had difficulty paying the 100,000 km guaranteed to secure their spot in the league. A number of players left over the summer due to financial issues as well. The league ultimately let the club participate, but the club's finances meant it ended up playing its juniors in the first two games of the season, losing 8–0 and 10–0 respectively. Sloga then failed to show up to their third-round game at home without requesting a postponement. The club finally withdrew from the league on 31 August 2019.

== Honours ==
=== Domestic ===
==== League ====
- First League of the Republika Srpska:
  - Runners-up (1): 2018–19
- Second League of the Republika Srpska:
  - Winners (1): 2017–18 (east)

==== Cups ====
- Bosnia and Herzegovina Cup:
  - Semi-finalists (1): 2018–19
