= 2018–19 First League of the Republika Srpska =

First League of the Republika Srpska
- Season: 2018–19
- Champions: Borac Banja Luka; 5th First League title
- Promoted: Borac Banja Luka
- Relegated: Sutjeska Foča; Sloboda Mrkonjić Grad
- Matches played: 191
- Goals scored: 437 (2.29 per match)
- Top goalscorer: Bojan Marković (15 goals)
- Biggest home win: Borac Banja Luka 5–0 Kozara (27 April 2019); Podrinje Janja 5–0 Tekstilac (17 November 2018); Željezničar Banja Luka 5–1 Podrinje Janja (24 November 2018); Sloga Gornje Crnjelovo 5–1 Željezničar Banja Luka (8 June 2019)
- Biggest away win: Kozara 2–4 Modriča (1 September 2018)
- Highest scoring: Željezničar Banja Luka 4–3 Kozara (13 October 2018)
- Longest winning run: 7 matches Borac Banja Luka
- Longest unbeaten run: 14 matches Borac Banja Luka
- Longest winless run: 19 matches Sloboda Mrkonjić Grad
- Longest losing run: 5 matches Sloboda Mrkonjić Grad; Podrinje Janja

The 2018–19 First League of the Republika Srpska was the twenty-fourth season of the First League of the Republika Srpska, the second tier football league of Bosnia and Herzegovina, since its original establishment and the seventeenth as a second-tier league.

== Teams ==
Location of clubs in 2018–19 First League RS
- FK Borac Banja Luka
- FK Drina Zvornik
- FK Kozara Gradiška
- FK Modriča
- FK Podrinje Janja
- FK Rudar Prijedor
- FK Slavija Sarajevo
- FK Sloboda Mrkonjić Grad
- FK Sloga Gornje Crnjelovo
- FK Sutjeska Foča
- FK Tekstilac Derventa
- FK Željezničar Banja Luka

== Regular season ==
Pos	Team	Pld	W	D	L	GF	GA	GD	Pts	Qualification
1	Borac Banja Luka	22	17	4	1	36	6	+30	55	Qualification for the Championship round
2	Sloga Gornje Crnjelovo	22	14	4	4	36	16	+20	46	Qualification for the Championship round
3	Rudar Prijedor	22	11	6	5	23	16	+7	39	Qualification for the Championship round
4	Željezničar Sport Team Banja Luka	22	10	3	9	38	28	+10	33	Qualification for the Championship round
5	Kozara	22	8	5	9	23	25	−2	29	Qualification for the Championship round
6	Podrinje Janja	22	8	5	9	25	30	−5	29	Qualification for the Championship round
7	Tekstilac Derventa	22	6	7	9	15	23	−8	25	Qualification for the Relegation round
8	Modriča	22	5	9	8	19	27	−8	24	Qualification for the Relegation round
9	Slavija	22	6	6	10	22	34	−12	24	Qualification for the Relegation round
10	Drina Zvornik	22	5	7	10	21	28	−7	22	Qualification for the Relegation round
11	Sutjeska Foča	22	5	5	12	23	29	−6	20	Qualification for the Relegation round
12	Sloboda Mrkonjić Grad	22	4	5	13	15	34	−19	17	Qualification for the Relegation round

Source: Soccerway
Rules for classification: 1) Points; 2) Head-to-head points; 3) Head-to-head goal difference; 4) Head-to-head goals scored; 5) Head-to-head away goals scored (only if two teams); 6) Goal difference; 7) Goals scored; 8) Play-off.

== Promotion round ==
Pos	Team	Pld	W	D	L	GF	GA	GD	Pts	Promotion
1	Borac Banja Luka (C, P)	32	25	5	2	60	14	+46	80	Promotion to the Premijer Liga BiH
2	Sloga Gornje Crnjelovo	32	18	6	8	51	27	+24	60	
3	Željezničar Sport Team Banja Luka	32	16	3	13	55	42	+13	51	
4	Rudar Prijedor	32	13	8	11	29	27	+2	47	
5	Kozara	32	12	9	11	36	40	−4	45	
6	Podrinje Janja	32	9	6	17	30	51	−21	33	

Source: Soccerway
Rules for classification: 1) Points; 2) Head-to-head points; 3) Head-to-head goal difference; 4) Head-to-head goals scored; 5) Head-to-head away goals scored (only if two teams); 6) Goal difference; 7) Goals scored; 8) Play-off.
(C) Champions; (P) Promoted

== Relegation round ==
Pos	Team	Pld	W	D	L	GF	GA	GD	Pts	Relegation
7	Slavija	32	11	9	12	39	44	−5	42	
8	Modriča	32	10	12	10	27	32	−5	42	
9	Tekstilac Derventa	32	9	12	11	22	27	−5	39	
10	Drina Zvornik (R)	32	9	10	13	34	36	−2	37	Relegation to the Second League RS
11	Sutjeska Foča (R)	32	9	7	16	37	41	−4	34	Relegation to the Second League RS
12	Sloboda Mrkonjić Grad (R)	32	4	7	21	19	58	−39	19	Relegation to the Second League RS

Source: Soccerway
Rules for classification: 1) Points; 2) Head-to-head points; 3) Head-to-head goal difference; 4) Head-to-head goals scored; 5) Head-to-head away goals scored (only if two teams); 6) Goal difference; 7) Goals scored; 8) Play-off.
(R) Relegated

== See also ==
- 2018–19 Premier League of Bosnia and Herzegovina
- 2018–19 First League of the Federation of Bosnia and Herzegovina
- 2018–19 Bosnia and Herzegovina Football Cup
