= Bojan Magazin =

Bosnian footballer (born 1976)

Personal information
- Date of birth: 12 December 1976 (age 49)
- Place of birth: Konjic, SFR Yugoslavia
- Height: 1.83 m (6 ft 0 in)
- Position: Midfielder

Senior career*
Years	Team	Apps	(Gls)
–1992	Igman Konjic		
- Sutjeska Nikšić
1998–1999	Vojvodina		
- Mogren
1999–2002	Sutjeska Nikšić		
2003	Mladost Gacko		
2003–2004	Modriča		
2004	Budućnost Podgorica	?	(1)
2005–2006	Modriča		
2006–2007	Leotar		
2007	Grbalj		
2008	Sarajevo		
2008–2010	Leotar	44	(4)
2010–2014	Modriča		

Managerial career
- 2014–2017: Tekstilac Derventa
- 2017: Orašje
- 2017: Zvijezda Gradačac
- * Club domestic league appearances and goals

Bojan Magazin (Serbian Cyrillic: Бојан Магазин; born 12 December 1976) is a Bosnian football manager and former player.

== Playing career ==
Born in Konjic, SR Bosnia and Herzegovina, back then still within Yugoslavia, Magazin played as midfielder and started his career with local side FK Igman Konjic, but he had to leave because of the start of the Bosnian War when he was only 16. He moved to FR Yugoslavia and there he played with top-league sides FK Sutjeska Nikšić, FK Vojvodina, and FK Mogren. He will then have a new spell with FK Sutjeska Nikšić, and spells with FK Mladost Gacko, On 26 May 2004, he was among the heroes of the 2003–04 Bosnian Cup final when his club, Modriča, won on penalties the favorites, FK Borac Banja Luka. FK Budućnost Podgorica, FK Modriča and FK Leotar. He started the 2007–08 season by playing with OFK Grbalj in the Montenegrin First League. On 21 January 2008, Magazin signed a year and a half contract with FK Sarajevo, FK Leotar and in summer 2010 he left Leotar and joined FK Modriča where he will play until summer 2014.

He scored one goal with FK Sutjeska Nikšić in the 1999–2000 First League of FR Yugoslavia. Then he made 23 appearances in the 2001–02 First League of FR Yugoslavia and 1 appearance in the 2002–03 First League of Serbia and Montenegro with FK Sutjeska Nikšić. Magazin scored one goal with Budućnost in the 2004–05 First League of Serbia and Montenegro. In the same season, 2004–05, he scored one goal with FK Modriča in the Bosnian Premier League. He made 25 appearances in the 2008–09 season, and 19 appearances and scored 4 goals with FK Leotar in the 2009–10 Premier League of Bosnia and Herzegovina.

== Managerial career ==
After retiring, Magazin became a manager. On 29 September 2014, he was appointed manager of Tekstilac Derventa in the 2014–15 First League of the Republika Srpska. After Tekstilac, he also managed Orašje and Zvijezda Gradačac.

== Honours ==
=== Player ===
Modriča

- Bosnian Cup: 2003–04
