= Branislav Krunić =

Bosnian football manager (born 1979)

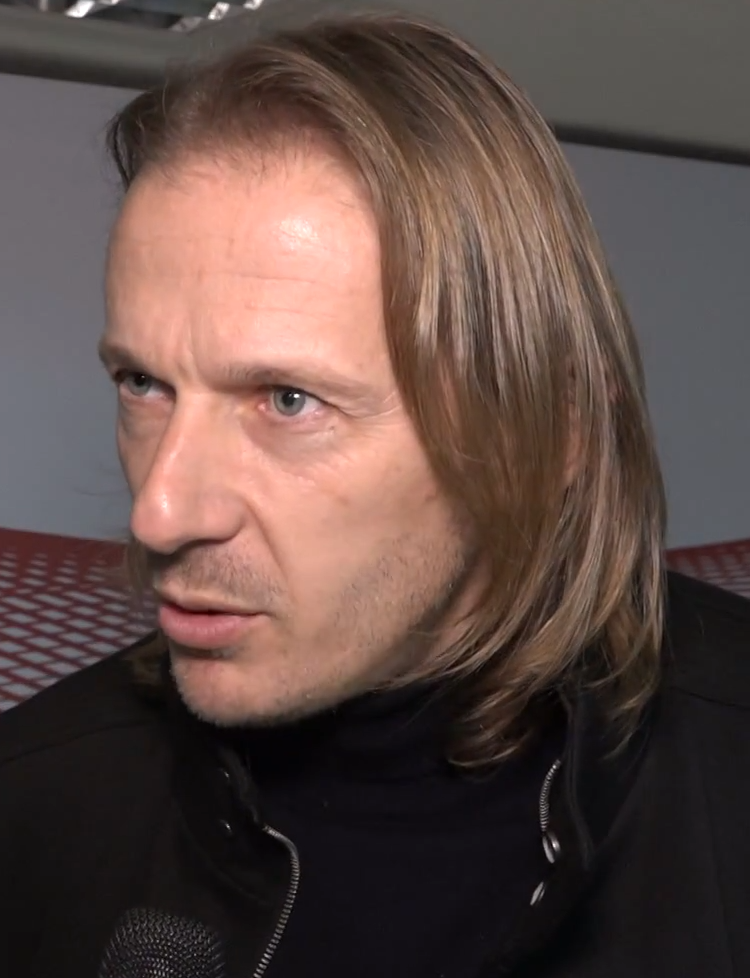
- Krunić in 2020

Personal information
- Date of birth: 28 January 1979 (age 47)
- Place of birth: Trebinje, SFR Yugoslavia
- Height: 1.87 m (6 ft 2 in)
- Position: Midfielder

Team information
- Current team: Bosnia and Herzegovina U21 (manager)

Senior career*
Years	Team	Apps	(Gls)
1999–2000	Leotar		
2000–2001	Olimpija Ljubljana	9	(1)
2001–2004	Leotar	30	(5)
2004–2005	Volyn Lutsk	33	(9)
2005–2006	Tom Tomsk	45	(6)
2007–2010	Moscow	51	(3)
2010	Leotar	7	(2)
2010	Dynamo Bryansk	14	(3)
2011–2013	Borac Banja Luka	52	(10)
2015–2019	Željezničar Banja Luka	28	(9)
Total		269	(48)

International career
2002–2008	Bosnia and Herzegovina	6	(0)

Managerial career
- 2017–2018: Željezničar Banja Luka
- 2018: Krupa
- 2019–2020: Borac Banja Luka
- 2021: Leotar
- 2023–2024: Željezničar Banja Luka
- 2024–2025: BSK Banja Luka
- 2025–: Bosnia and Herzegovina U21
- * Club domestic league appearances and goals

Branislav Krunić (Serbian Cyrillic: Бранислав Крунић; born 28 January 1979) is a Bosnian professional football manager and former player who is the manager of the Bosnia and Herzegovina U21 national team.

== International career ==
Krunić made his debut for Bosnia and Herzegovina on 11 October 2002, against Germany. After that match, Krunić was recalled by Fuad Muzurović in March 2007, for UEFA Euro 2008 qualifying. In total, Krunić played four times at the qualifying. After Muzurović was sacked, Krunić was selected once for the national team by Miroslav Blažević.

He earned a total of 6 caps, scoring no goals. His final international was a November 2008 friendly match against Slovenia.

== Managerial career ==
Krunić retired from football on 15 March 2013, because the issue in football had overshadowed the risk of heart disease, but later returned again as a player-manager to the then Bosnian fourth division club Željezničar Banja Luka, who he led in the First League of RS during the 2017–18 season.

He again retired in May 2018, but once again came out of retirement in November 2018 and came back to Željezničar Banja Luka. In January 2019, he left Željezničar and once again retired from the game and decided to focus only on his managerial career.

From June to October 2018, he was manager of Krupa in the Bosnian Premier League.

On 9 June 2019, it was announced that Krunić became the new manager of Borac Banja Luka. He led Borac to a third-place finish in the first half of the 2019–20 season, with the same number of points as second placed Željezničar and only one point less than first placed Sarajevo. On 5 March 2020, he was sacked after defeats against Sarajevo in the league and Željezničar in the cup, with Borac being in poor form.

On 23 June 2021, Krunić was named as the new manager of Leotar, also in the Bosnian Premier League. He was sacked as Leotar's manager in December 2021. In July 2023, Krunić returned to managing Željezničar Banja Luka. On 23 September 2024, he was appointed manager of BSK Banja Luka.

On 5 August 2025, Krunić became head coach of the Bosnia and Herzegovina U21 national team.

== Managerial statistics ==
As of match played 31 March 2026

Managerial record by team and tenure
Team	From	To	Record				
Team	From	To	G	W	D	L	Win %
Željezničar Banja Luka	1 July 2017	3 May 2018	25	8	5	12	32.00
Krupa	11 June 2018	8 October 2018	15	3	5	7	20.00
Borac Banja Luka	9 June 2019	5 March 2020	24	12	6	6	50.00
Leotar	23 June 2021	13 December 2021	21	5	4	12	23.81
Željezničar Banja Luka	5 July 2023	22 September 2024	42	19	7	16	45.24
BSK Banja Luka	23 September 2024	4 August 2025	28	22	3	3	78.57
Bosnia and Herzegovina U21	5 August 2025	Present	6	1	4	1	16.67
Total			161	70	34	57	43.48

== Honours ==
=== Player ===
Leotar

- First League of RS: 2001–02
- Bosnian Premier League: 2002–03

Borac Banja Luka

- Bosnian Premier League: 2010–11

Željezničar Banja Luka

- Second League of RS: 2016–17 (West)
