= Boris Savić =

Bosnian footballer and manager

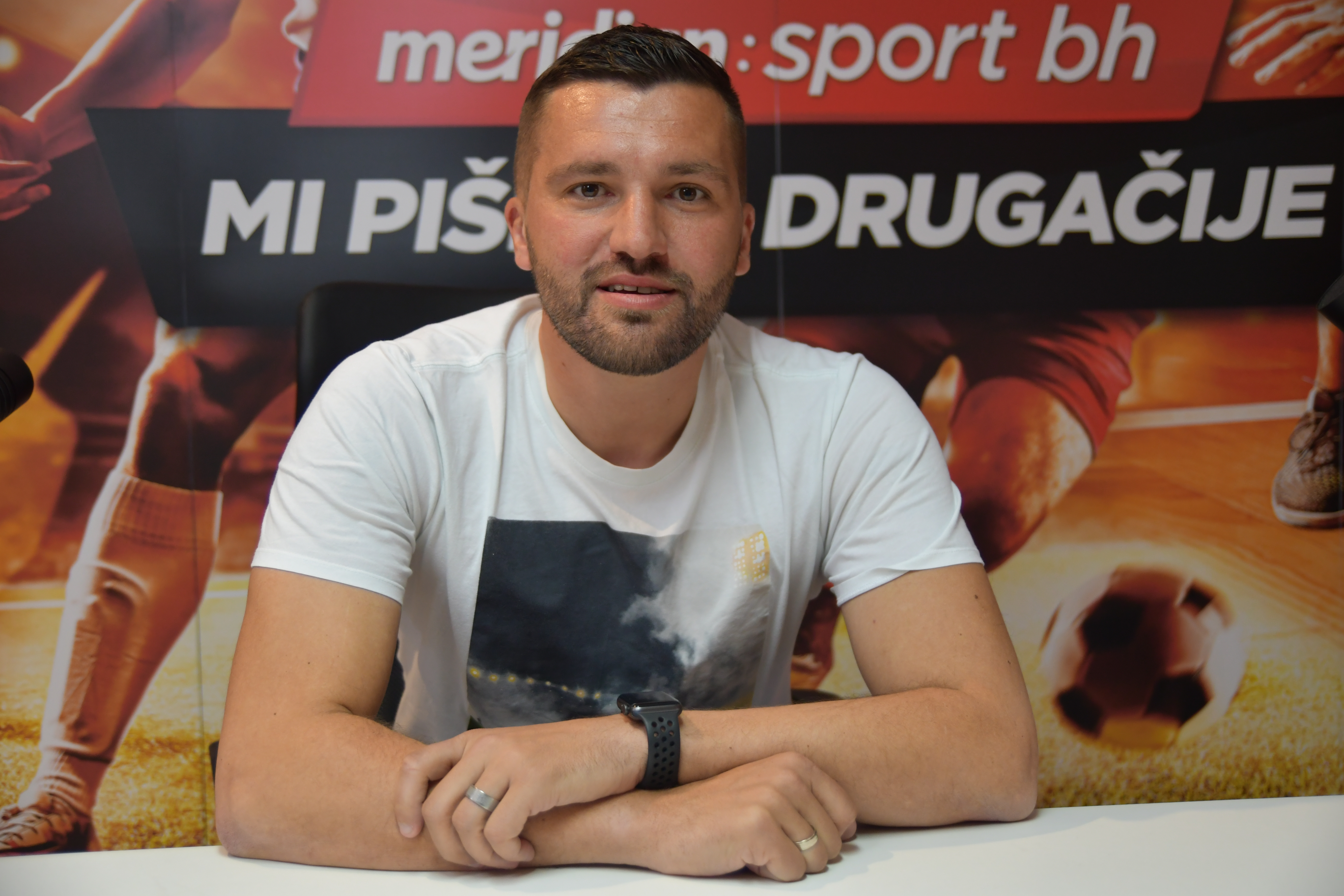

Personal information
- Date of birth: January 18, 1988 (age 38)
- Place of birth: Trebinje, SFR Yugoslavia
- Height: 1.84 m (6 ft 0 in)
- Position: Centre-back

Youth career
- Red Star Belgrade

Senior career*
Years	Team	Apps	(Gls)
2005–2007	Red Star Belgrade	0	(0)
2005–2006	→ Tavankut (loan)	5	(0)
2006–2007	→ Palić (loan)	15	(0)
2007–2008	Sinđelić Beograd	9	(0)
2008	Hajduk Beograd	14	(0)
2009	Laktaši	9	(0)
2010	Rad	0	(0)
2011	Olimpik	10	(1)
2011	Borac Banja Luka	7	(0)
2012–2013	Rudar Prijedor	29	(2)
2014	Mornar	0	(0)
2014–2015	Moroka Swallows	10	(0)

International career
2009–2010	Bosnia and Herzegovina U21	4	(0)

Managerial career
- 2016–2017: Jedinstvo Žeravica
- 2017: Alki Oroklini (assistant)
- 2018: Jedinstvo Surčin
- 2018–2019: Jedinstvo Žeravica
- 2019: Zvijezda 09
- 2020: IMT
- 2020–2021: Rudar Prijedor
- 2021–2022: Mačva Šabac
- 2023: Red Star Belgrade (assistant)
- * Club domestic league appearances and goals

Boris Savić (Serbian Cyrillic: Борис Савић born 18 January 1988) is a Bosnian professional football manager and former player.

== Playing career ==
Born in Trebinje, SR Bosnia and Herzegovina, Savić started his career in Serbia by playing with the youth teams of Red Star Belgrade. As a senior, he started playing in Serbian lower-league sides Tavankut, Palić, Sinđelić Beograd and Hajduk Beograd. After a short spell in Bosnia and Herzegovina with Laktaši, he was back to Serbia this time by signing with Rad, after trials in Germany with TSV 1860 Munich. Next, Savić was back in Bosnia playing with Olimpik, Borac Banja Luka and Rudar Prijedor. He then had a spell at Mornar in the Montenegrin First League as well.

One of three European additions to Moroka Swallows in 2014, Savić missed the club's first two matches owing to work permit delays. After being cleared to play, he was sidelined for six weeks due to getting an injury and had to unpremeditatedly undergo an operation. In the end, Savić left Moroka Swallows as his mother was ill and asked the club if he could return to his home country.

Shortly after leaving Moroka, Savić decided to finish his playing career.

== Managerial career ==
He started as manager of Bosnian club Jedinstvo Žeravica, and in the summer of 2017 he moved to Cyprus where he became an assistant manager of Vladan Milojević at Alki Oroklini. In May 2018, he came back to Jedinstvo Žeravica. In the 2018–19 season, Savić won the Second League of RS - west division, and got the club promoted to the First League of RS. On 4 July 2019 however, Jedinstvo decided not to participate in the 2019–20 First League of RS season because of financial reasons.

On 27 May 2019, shortly after winning the league with Jedinstvo, he left the club and became the new manager of, at the time, Bosnian Premier League club Zvijezda 09. In his first league game as Zvijezda's manager, the club lost 1–5 at home against Tuzla City on 20 July 2019. On 31 August 2019, Savić decided to leave Zvijezda 09 after a poor start to the 2019–20 season.

On 10 January 2020, he was named manager of Serbian club IMT, who he later on promoted to the Serbian First League. After leaving IMT, on 21 May 2020, Savić replaced Igor Janković as manager of First League of RS club Rudar Prijedor. He decided to leave Rudar on 18 April 2021.

== Honours ==
=== Manager ===
Jedinstvo Žeravica

- Second League of RS: 2018–19 (West)

IMT

- Serbian League Belgrade: 2019–20
