= FK Velež Nevesinje =

Association football club in Bosnia and Herzegovina

- Founded: 1932; 94 years ago
- Ground: Gradski Stadion Nevesinje
- Capacity: 2,000
- Manager: Vacant
- League: First League of RS
- 2024–25: First League of RS, 12th of 20

Fudbalski klub Velež Nevesinje is a professional football club based in Nevesinje, Republika Srpska, an entity of Bosnia and Herzegovina. It currently plays in the First League of the Republika Srpska. In 2024, the club signed a cooperative agreement with the famous FK Velež Mostar.

== Stadium ==
The club's home venue is the 2,000 seat Gradski Stadion Nevesinje. The stadium underwent the first phase of a major redevelopment project in 2016. A second phase of renovation including the professionalization of the field was carried out in 2019.
