= Adnan Zildžović =

Bosnian footballer (born 1969)

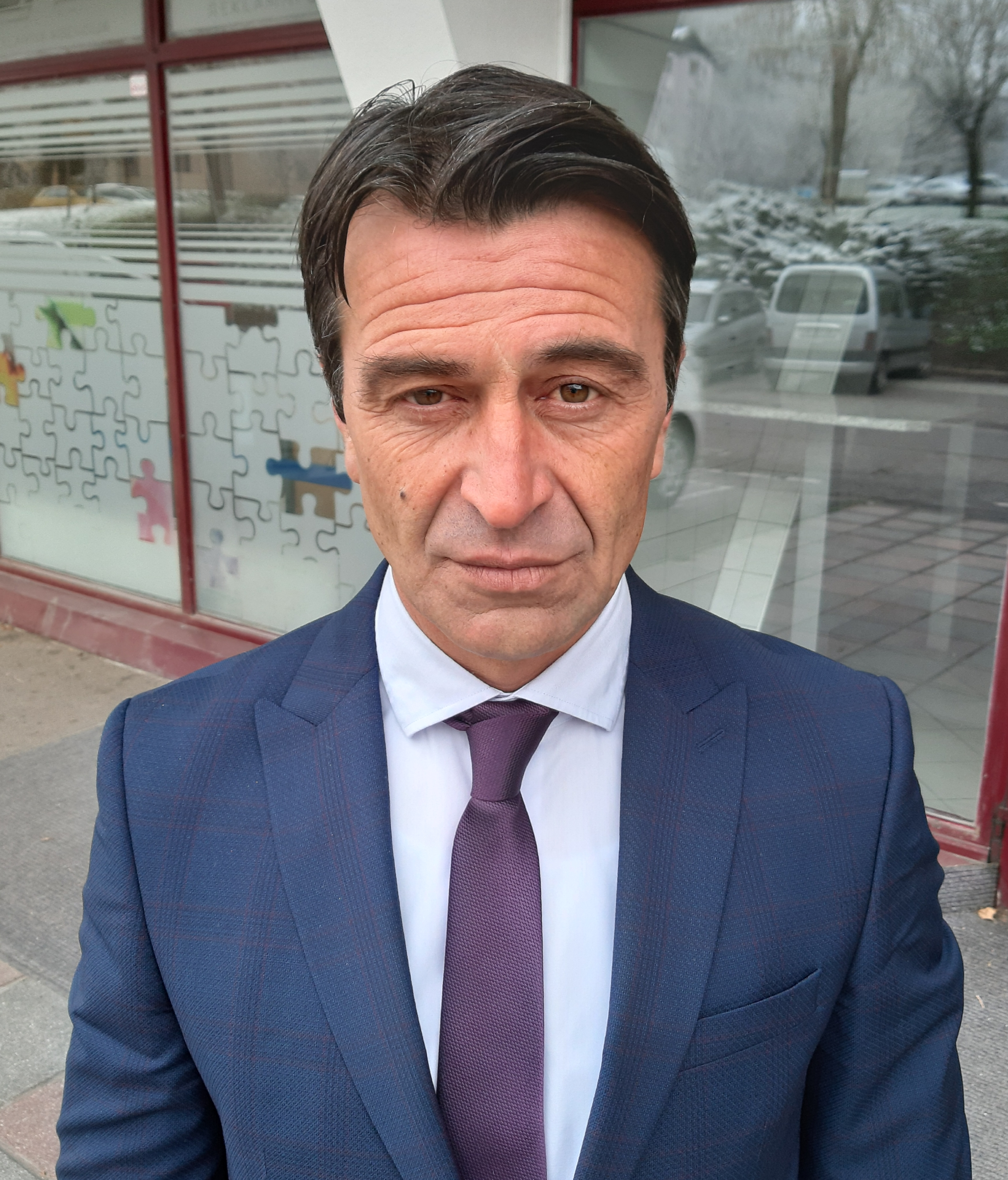
- Zildžović in 2019

Personal information
- Date of birth: 28 October 1969 (age 57)
- Place of birth: Brčko, SFR Yugoslavia
- Height: 1.82 m (6 ft 0 in)
- Position: Midfielder

Team information
- Current team: Krško Posavje (head coach)

Youth career
- 1978–1986: Jedinstvo Brčko

Senior career*
Years	Team	Apps	(Gls)
1986–1993	Jedinstvo Brčko		
1993–1995	Steklar		
1995–1996	Celje	17	(1)
1996–1997	Suhl 06	3	(1)
1997	Waldhof Mannheim	9	(0)
1997–1998	Korotan Prevalje	14	(2)
1998	Maccabi Jaffa	10	(0)
1999	Hapoel Jerusalem	13	(0)
1999	Korotan Prevalje	16	(2)
2000	Celje	3	(0)
2000–2001	Krško		
2003–2007	Krka	77	(16)

Managerial career
- 2002–2003: Krško
- 2003–2007: Krka
- 2007–2008: Bela Krajina
- 2008–2009: Drava Ptuj
- 2010–2012: Krško
- 2012–2013: Al-Taawoun U23
- 2013–2014: Krka
- 2016: Bylis Ballsh
- 2017: Radomlje
- 2018–2019: Mladost Doboj Kakanj
- 2019–2020: Zvijezda 09
- 2022–2023: Rudar Velenje
- 2024–2025: Krka
- 2025–: Krško Posavje
- * Club domestic league appearances and goals

Adnan Zildžović (born 28 October 1969) is a Bosnian professional football manager and former player.

== Club career ==
Zildžović started his career in 1986 with his hometown club Jedinstvo Brčko and later had foreign spells with Steklar, Celje and Korotan Prevalje in Slovenia.

He has also played for 1. Suhler SV 06 and SV Waldhof Mannheim in Germany and for Krško in Slovenia, before retiring from active football in 2001.

== Managerial career ==
In his managerial career, Zildžović has managed Krško, Krka, Bela Krajina, Drava Ptuj, Al-Taawoun FC U23, Bylis Ballsh, Radomlje, Mladost Doboj Kakanj, Zvijezda 09, and Rudar Velenje.

With Krka in 2007, he won the 2006–07 Slovenian Third League (West Division).

On 17 August 2018, Zildžović became the new manager of Premier League of Bosnia and Herzegovina club Mladost Doboj Kakanj. On 8 April 2019, after making a series of five matches without a win in the league, which culminated with a 2–0 home loss against Tuzla City two days before, Zildžović decided to leave Mladost.

On 9 October 2019, he was named new manager of Bosnian Premier League team Zvijezda 09. Zildžović decided to leave Zvijezda on 9 March 2020.

== Honours ==
=== Manager ===
Krka

- Slovenian Third League (West): 2006–07
