= Ugljevik City Stadium =

Stadium in Ugljevik, Bosnia and Herzegovina

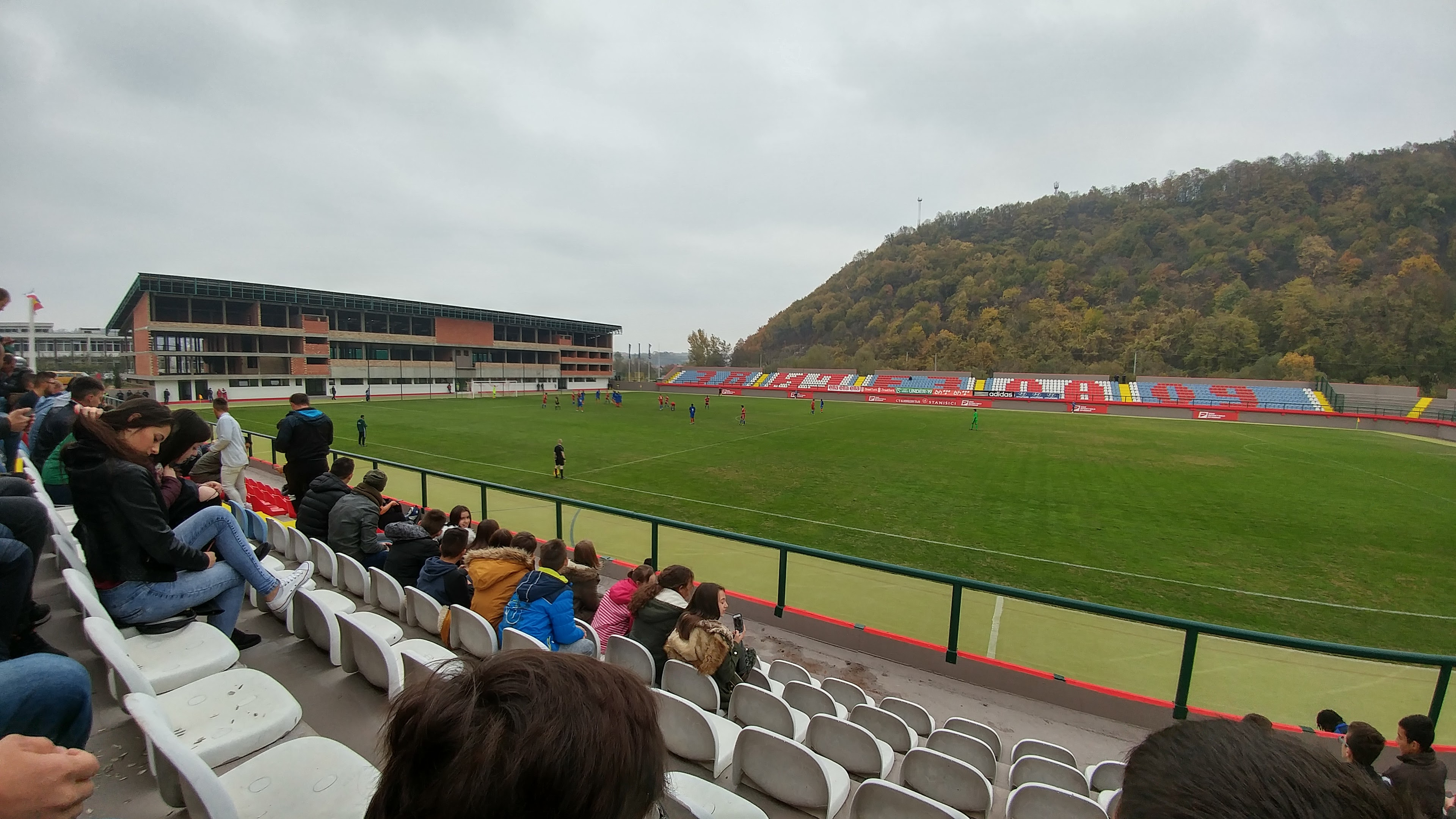
- Interactive map of Ugljevik City Stadium
- Full name: Ugljevik City Stadium
- Location: Ugljevik, Bosnia and Herzegovina
- Coordinates: 44.690556°N 18.997778°E
- Owner: Boris Stanišić
- Operator: FK Zvijezda 09
- Capacity: 4,200
- Surface: Grass

Construction
- Built: 2000
- Renovated: 2017

Tenant
- FK Zvijezda 09

Ugljevik City Stadium is a football stadium located in Ugljevik, in Northeastern Bosnia and Herzegovina. It is the home ground of FK Zvijezda 09. The capacity of the stadium is 4,200 with 3,742 individual seats.

The stadium was bought for 803,000 marks in March 2017.
