= Abid Mujagić =

Bosnian footballer

Personal information
- Date of birth: 5 August 1993 (age 33)
- Place of birth: Goražde, Bosnia and Herzegovina
- Height: 1.77 m (5 ft 9 1/2 in)
- Position: Right winger

Team information
- Current team: Sloboda Tuzla
- Number: 93

Youth career
- –2011: Radnik Hadžići
- 2011–2012: Teplice

Senior career*
Years	Team	Apps	(Gls)
2010–2011	Radnik Hadžići		
2012–2014	Teplice	13	(0)
2012–2013	→ Baník Most (loan)	23	(2)
2013	→ Ústí nad Labem (loan)	11	(0)
2014	→ Roudnice nad Labem (loan)	9	(2)
2014	→ Kolín (loan)	3	(0)
2015–2015	Goražde	24	(1)
2016–2017	Zvijezda Gradačac	26	(8)
2017	Inter Zaprešić	9	(0)
2017–2018	Mladost Doboj Kakanj	42	(9)
2019	Zrinjski Mostar	6	(2)
2019–	Sloboda Tuzla	40	(3)

International career
2010	Bosnia and Herzegovina U17		
- * Club domestic league appearances and goals as of 3 April 2021

Abid Mujagić (born 5 August 1993) is a Bosnian professional footballer who plays as a right winger for Bosnian Premier League club Sloboda Tuzla.

== Career ==
After playing for the youth and senior team of FK Radnik Hadžići, Abid, aged 18, moved abroad to FK Teplice, where he joined the youth team. The year before, he was called up for the Bosnia and Herzegovina U-17 team He couldn't get much playing time for the senior team and was sent to two back to back loans in second-tier teams, first a season at FK Baník Most and then half a season at FK Ústí nad Labem. A half-season stint at FK Teplice's third-tier farm team SK Roudnice nad Labem followed., followed by another second-tier loan at FK Kolín, with only three caps for the team.

At the beginning of 2015, Mujagić moved back to Bosnia and Herzegovina and joined second-tier FK Goražde, playing there for a year before moving on to Zvijezda Gradačac. In early 2017, Mujagić moved abroad again, this time to the Croatian Prva HNL team NK Inter Zaprešić. After a short stint in Inter, Mujagić went to Bosnian Premier League club FK Mladost Doboj Kakanj. After a year and a half he left the club.

On 9 January 2019, Mujagić signed a one-and-a-half-year contract with HŠK Zrinjski Mostar. He made his debut for the club on 3 March 2019, in a 0–0 draw against FK Radnik Bijeljina. Mujagić left Zrinjski on 13 June 2019.

Shortly after leaving Zrinjski, on 11 July 2019, Mujagić signed a contract with FK Sloboda Tuzla. He made his debut for Sloboda on 21 July 2019, in a 2–1 home league win against FK Radnik Bijeljina. In that same game he also scored an own goal in the 85th minute.
