= HNK Drinovci =

- Full name: Hrvatski Nogometni Klub Drinovci
- Ground: Igralište Boljava, Drinovci
- Capacity: 1,500
- League: Cantonal league West Herzegovina
- 2020/21: 1st

Hrvatski Nogometni Klub Drinovci (English: Croatian Football Club Drinovci), commonly referred to as HNK Drinovci or simply Drinovci, is a football club from Drinovci, Bosnia and Herzegovina.

== History ==
Until 2003 the club was known as NK Boljava. They currently play in the Cantonal league West Herzegovina, which is part of the fourth tier of the Bosnian football league system. Hailing from a small village at the Croatian border, they were relegated from the second level-First League (Prva Liga FBiH) when they finished in 11th place in the 2007/08 season.

== Club seasons ==
Season	League									Cup	Europe
Season	Division	P	W	D	L	F	A	Pts	Pos	Cup	Europe
2001–02	Second League of the Federation of Bosnia and Herzegovina								↑		
2002–03	First League of FBiH	36	16	6	14	48	59	54	8th		
2003–04	First League of FBiH	30	11	6	13	27	39	39	12th		
2004–05	First League of FBiH	30	9	5	16	33	53	32	15th ↓		
2005–06	Second League of the Federation of Bosnia and Herzegovina										
2006–07	Second League of the Federation of Bosnia and Herzegovina								↑		
2007–08	First League of FBiH	30	13	4	13	29	36	43	11th ↓		
2017–18	League of West Herzegovina Canton	10	5	1	4	25	32	16	2nd		
2018–19	League of West Herzegovina Canton	12	9	1	2	46	19	28	2nd		
2019–20	League of West Herzegovina Canton	6	4	1	1	24	13	13	2nd		
2020–21	League of West Herzegovina Canton	12	9	1	2	30	18	28	1st		
