= Laktaši =

City in Republika Srpska, Bosnia and Herzegovina

Laktaši Лакташи (Serbian)
- City
- Grad Laktaši; Град Лакташи; City of Laktaši
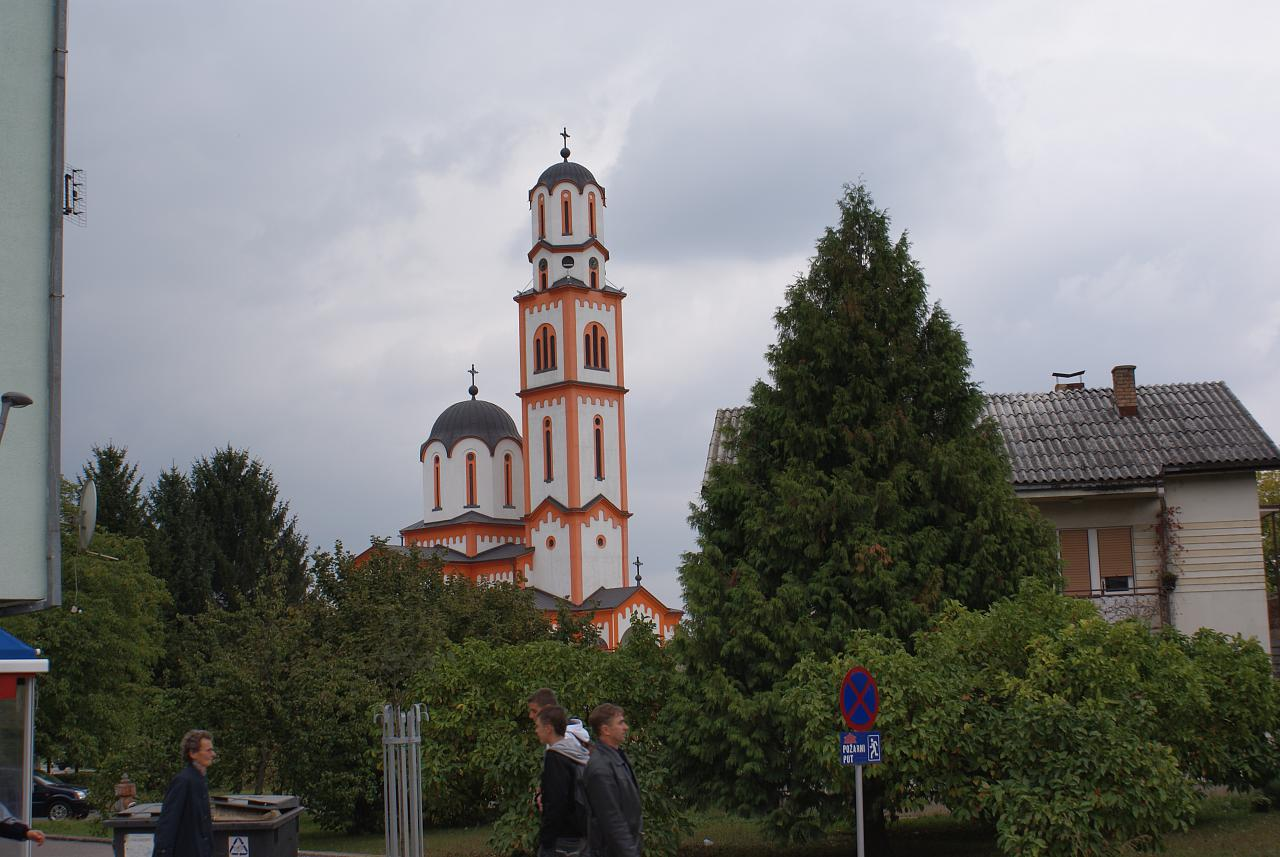
- Laktaši

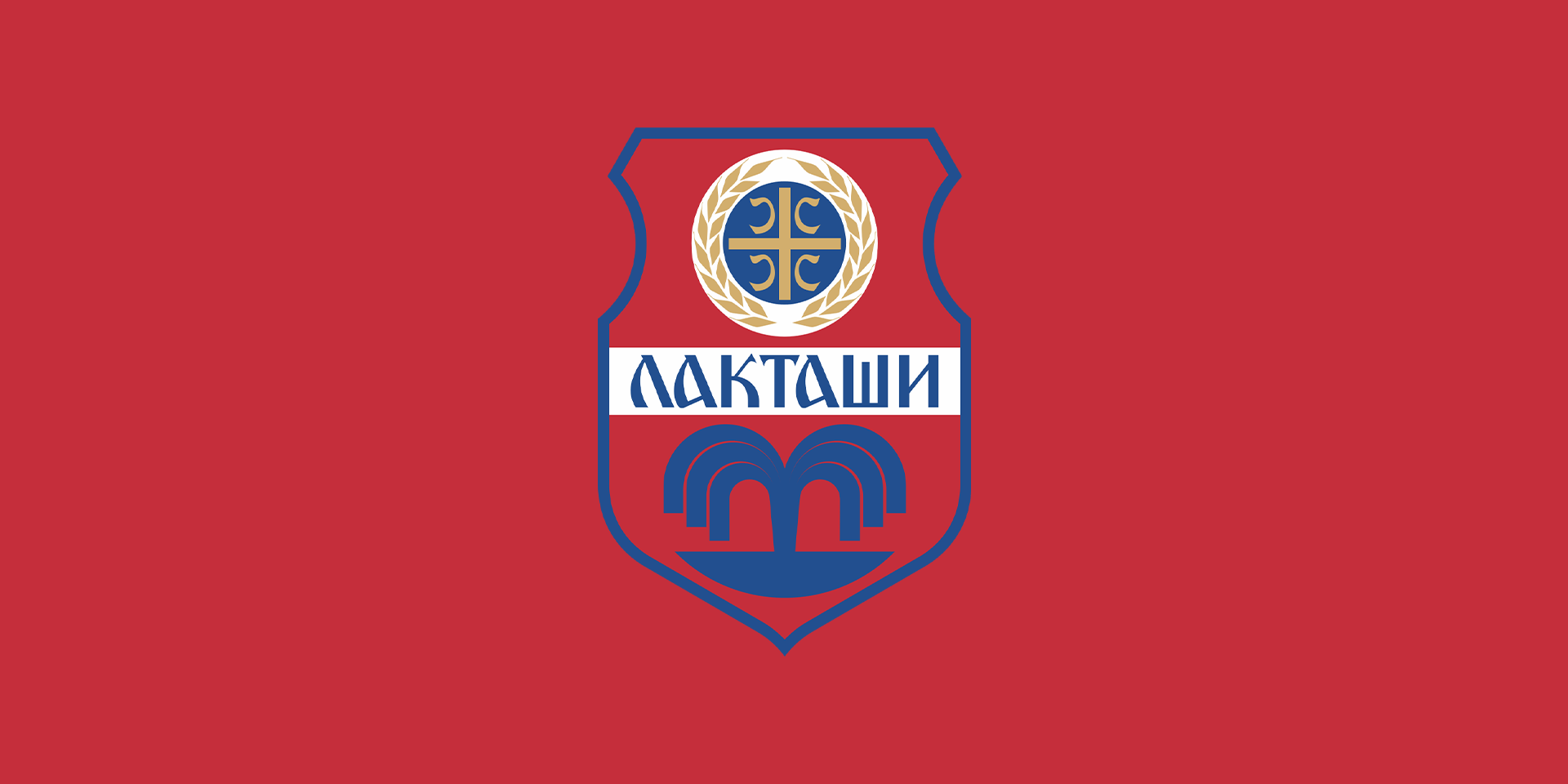
- Flag Coat of arms

- Location of Laktaši (municipality) within Republika Srpska

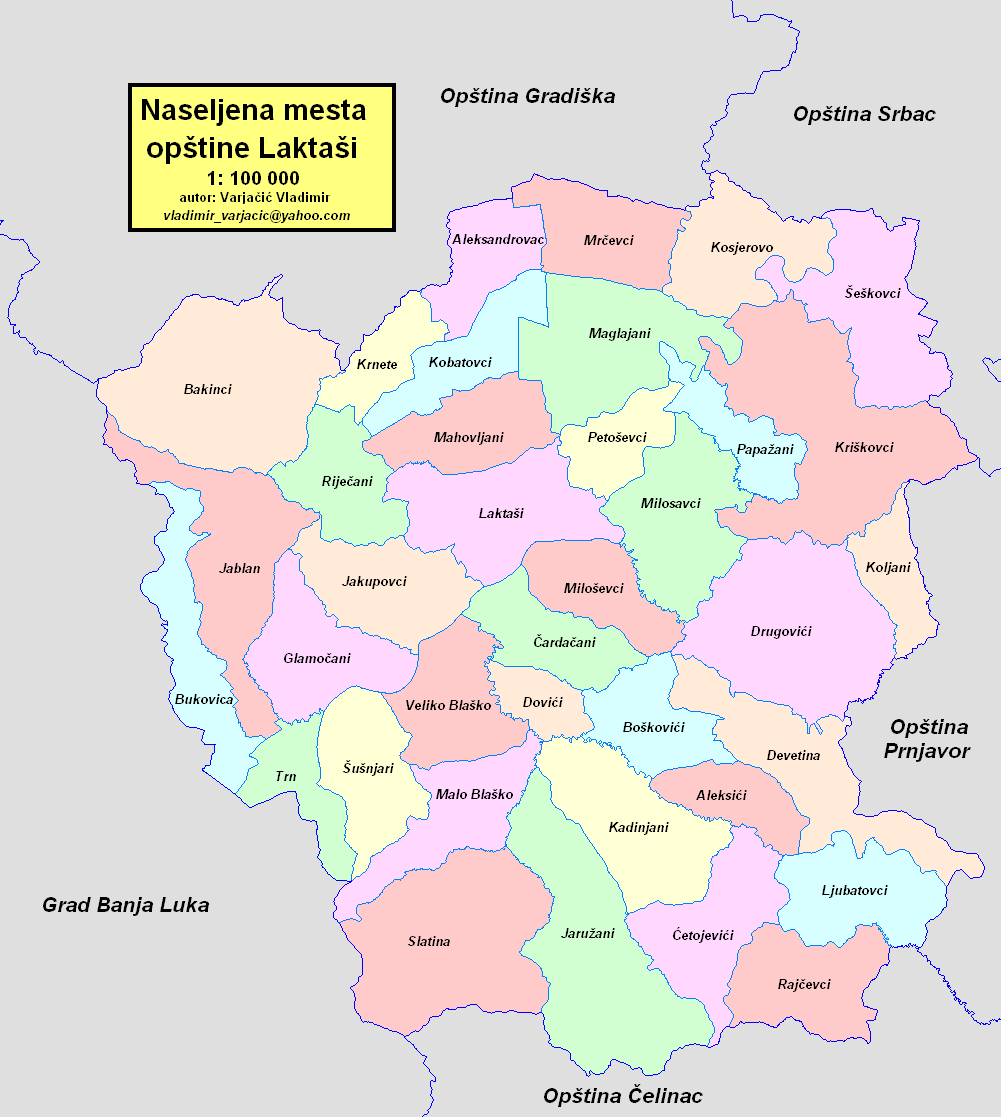
- Coordinates: 44°54′33″N 17°18′06″E
- Country: Bosnia and Herzegovina
- Entity: Republika Srpska
- Geographical region: Bosanska Krajina

Government
  - Mayor: Miroslav Bojić (SNSD)
  - City: 388.37 km^{2} (149.95 sq mi)

Population (2013 census)
  - Urban: 5,879
  - City: 34,966
  - City density: 90.033/km^{2} (233.18/sq mi)
- Time zone: UTC+1 (CET)
  - Summer (DST): UTC+2 (CEST)
- Area code: 51
- Website: opstina-laktasi.com

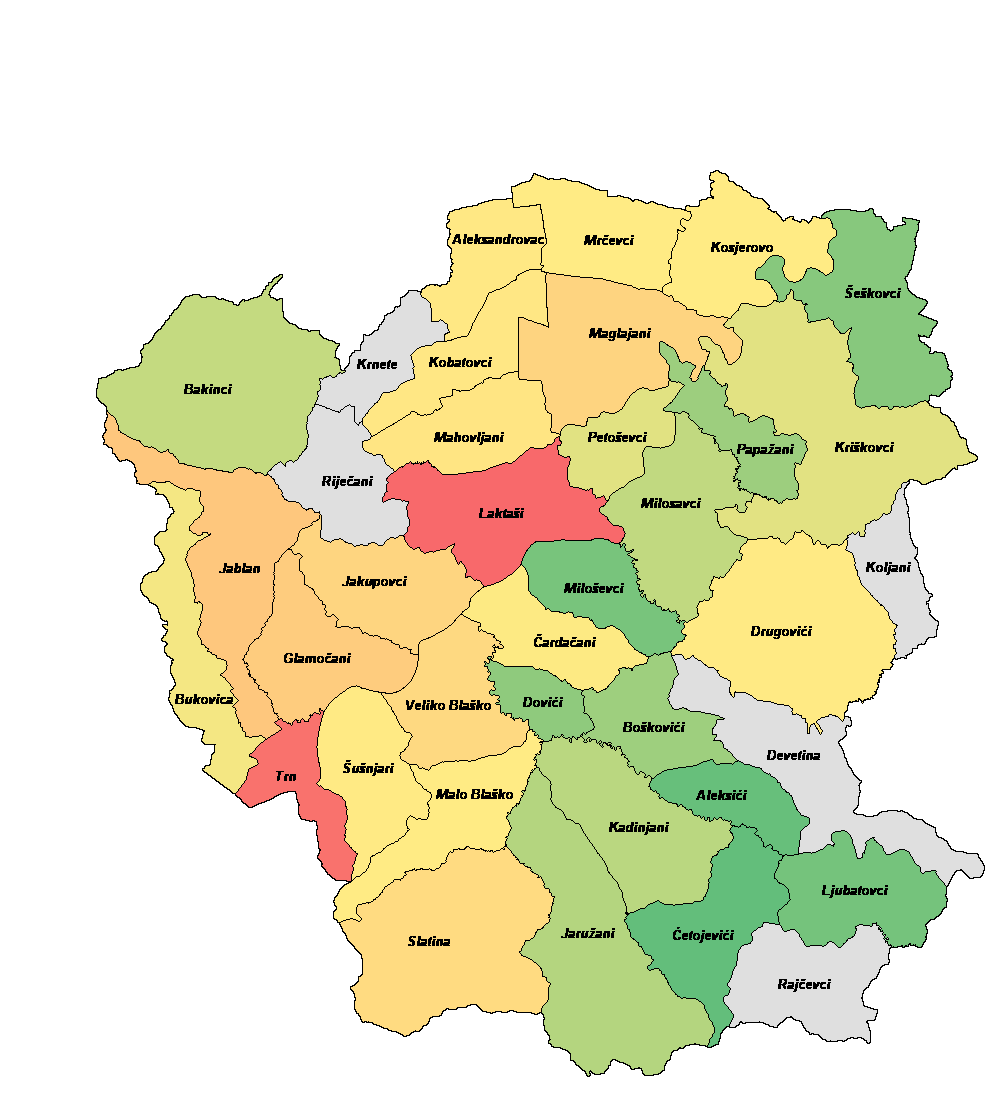
Laktaši municipality by population proportional to the settlement with the highest and lowest population

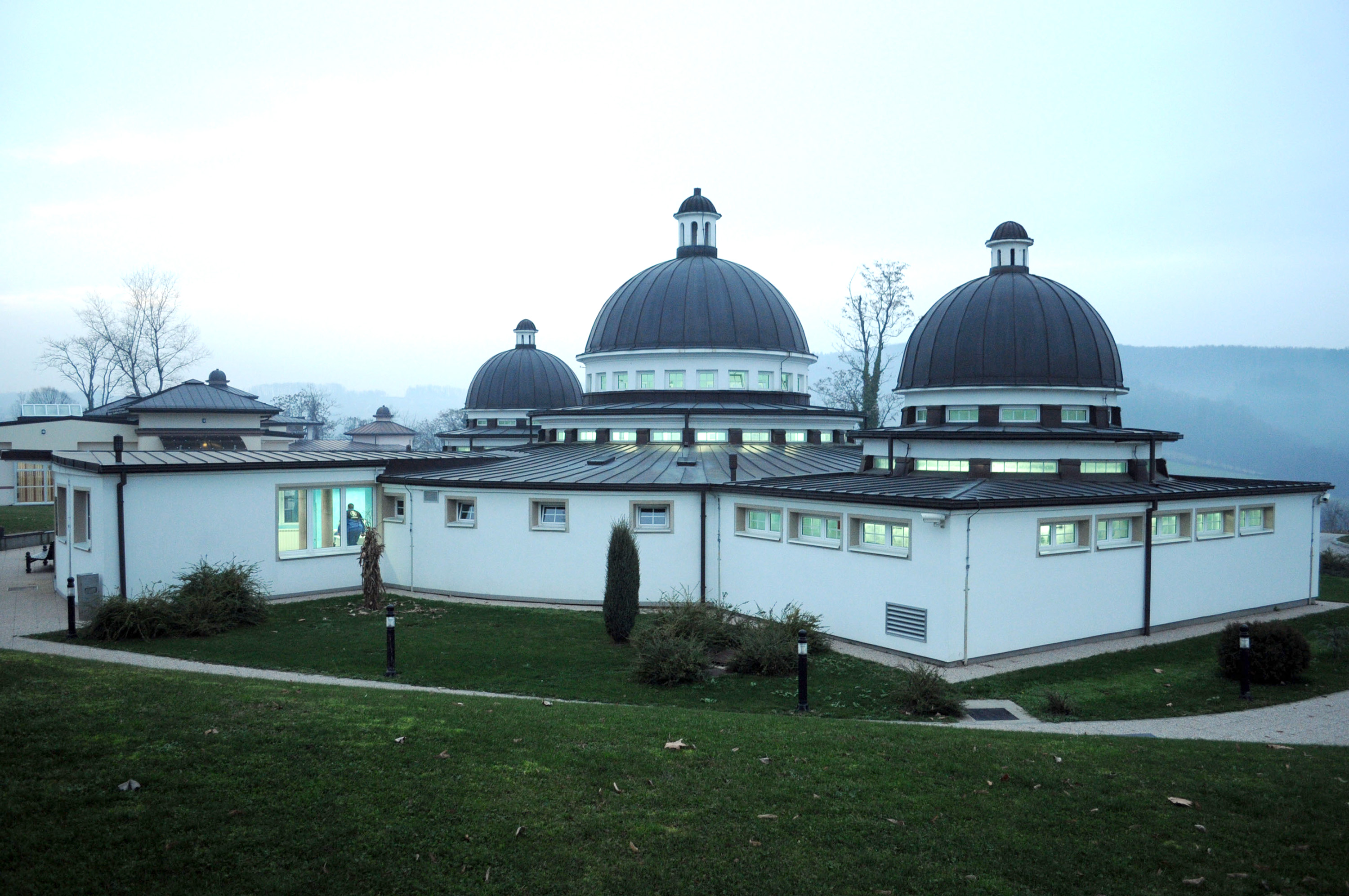
Spa Slatina

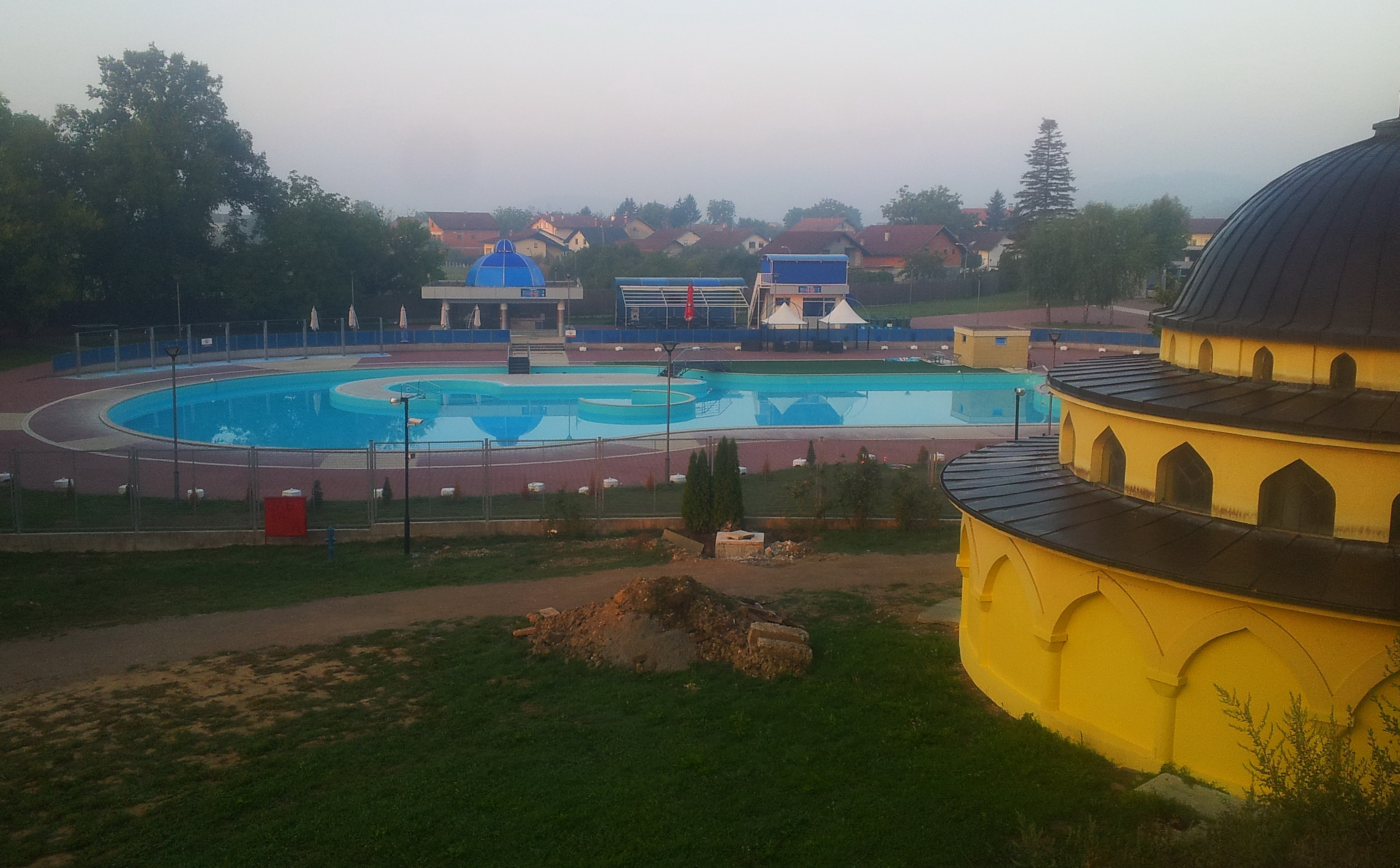
Spa Laktaši

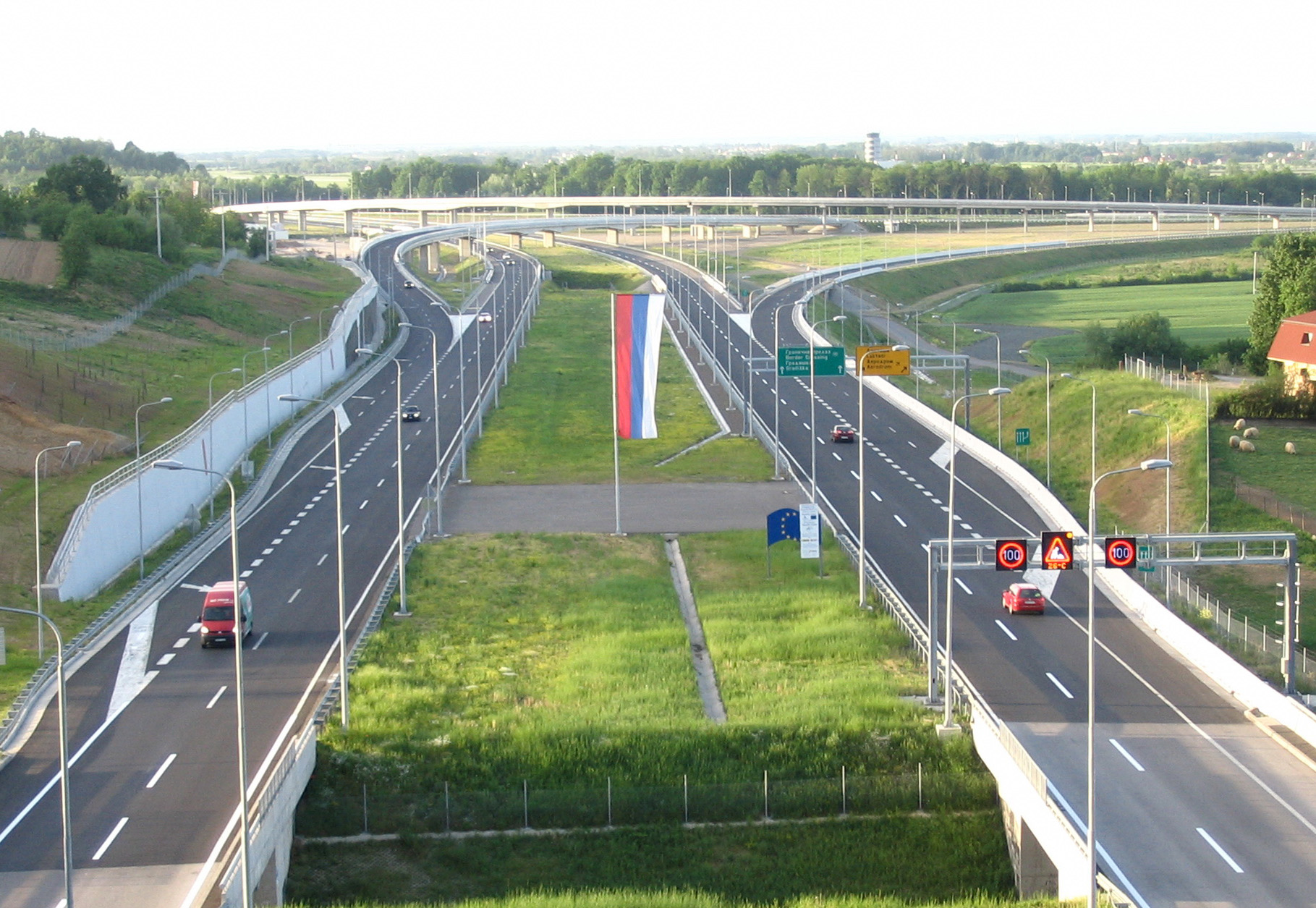
Laktaši - highway

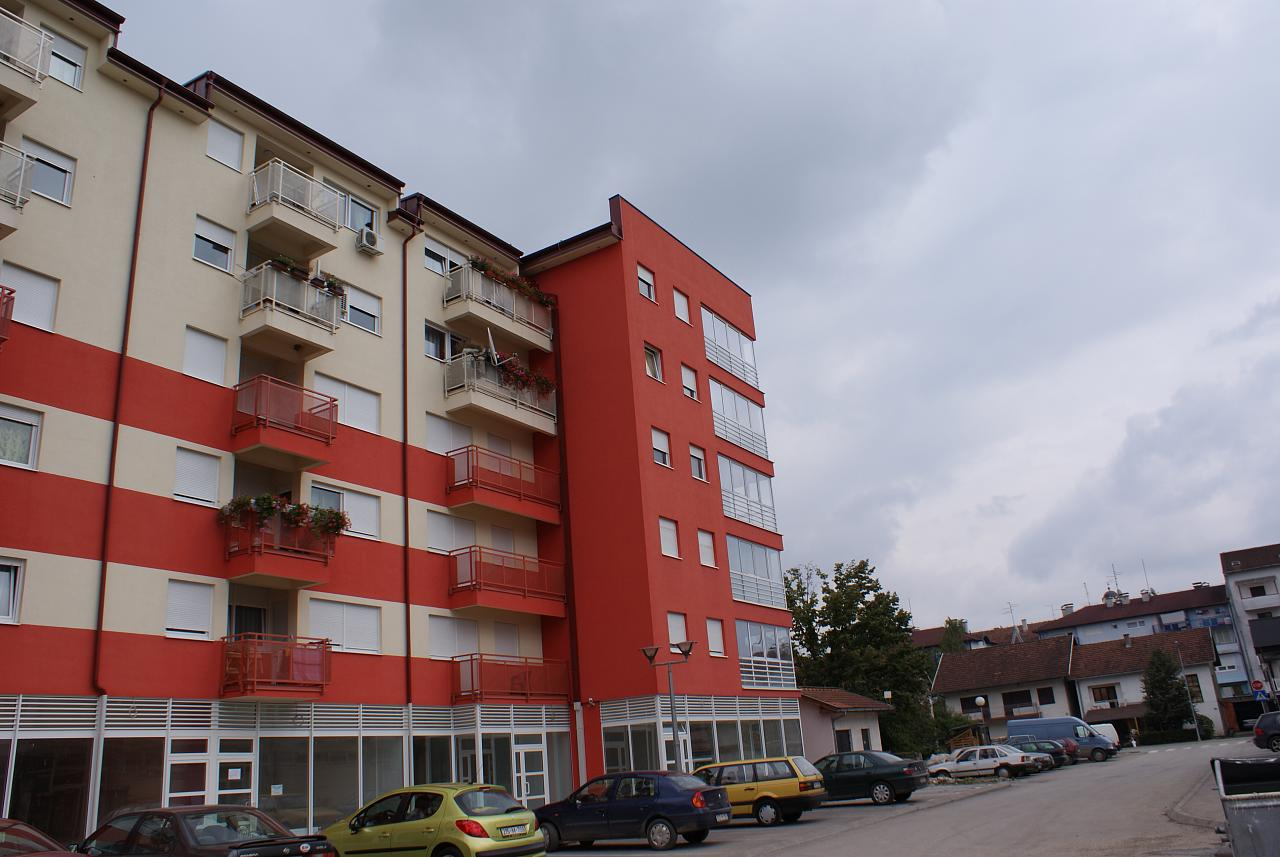
Street in Laktaši

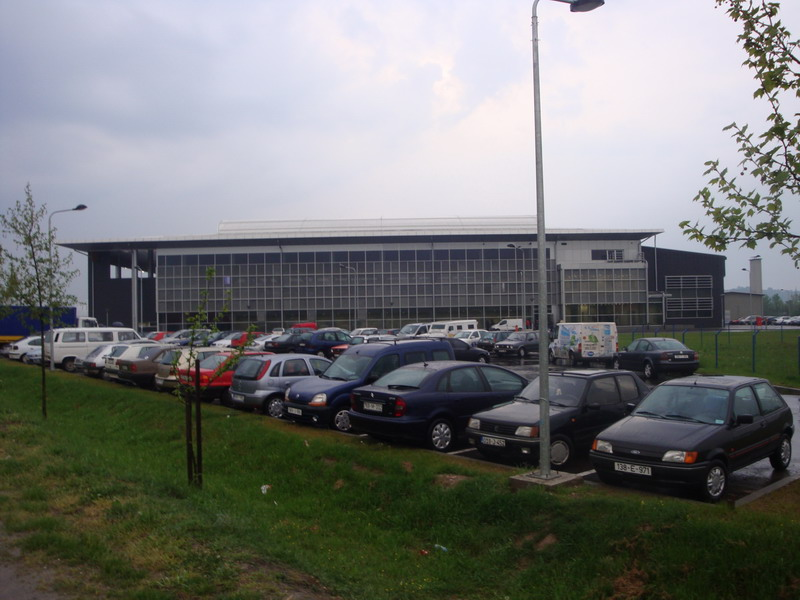
Sports hall in Laktaši

Laktaši (Serbian Cyrillic: Лакташи) is a city in Republika Srpska, Bosnia and Herzegovina. As of 2013, the municipality had a population of 34,966, while the town has a population of 5,879.

== Geography ==
=== Physical geography ===
Laktaši municipality is located in Lijevče polje, 19 km north of Banja Luka. The river Vrbas, which flows in the middle of its territory, divides it into the Župa (right bank of the Vrbas) and the Potkozarsko-Lijevčanski part (the left bank of the Vrbas). Lijevče polje, along the fertile Semberian plains, a geographical part of the Peripanon region, is the main granary of Republika Srpska.

=== Political geography ===
The Laktaši municipality is located in the northeastern part of the entity of Republika Srpska on the coordinates of 44°54′33″N and 17°18′06″E and borders the city of Banja Luka, and the municipalities of Gradiška, Srbac, Prnjavor and Čelinac. Laktaši municipality takes up an area of 338,37 km2 (149,95 sq mi).

The area of this municipality has had a favorable traffic position in the past, beginning with the time of the Romans, when the so-called "salt path" that connected Salona to Servicio. Today, the Banja Luka - Gradiška and Banja Luka - Doboj highways pass through the Laktaši municipality, connecting the Laktaši municipality with the Zagreb - Belgrade highway, and in the future with the Budapest - Ploče highway. Laktaši municipality also has the only international airport in the Republic of Srpska, located north of the Laktaši town, near the village of Mahovljani.

=== Climate ===
Laktaši municipality has a continental climate, with harsh winters and warm summers. The warmest month of the year is July, with an average temperature of 25°C (77°F). The coldest month of the year is January, when temperatures average -5°C (23 °F). Annual precipitation forLaktaši municipality is about 875 mm. Due to the city's high latitude; it snows almost every year as well. Strong winds come from the north and northeast bringing in much snow.

== Demographics ==
According to the 2013 census results, the municipality of Laktaši has a population of 34,966.

=== Population ===
Population of settlements – Laktaši municipality
	Settlement	1948	1953	1961	1971	1981	1991	2013
	Total	3,341	8,239	26,201	25,997	27,676	29,910	34,966
1	Aleksandrovac						677	802
2	Aleksići						204	216
3	Bakinci						608	489
4	Boškovići						403	378
5	Bukovica						558	631
6	Čardačani						596	659
7	Ćetojevići						241	202
8	Dovići						310	332
9	Drugovići						876	721
10	Glamočani						1,612	1,928
11	Jablan						1,368	2,127
12	Jakupovci						1,180	1,579
13	Jaružani						550	444
14	Kadinjani						623	461
15	Kobatovci						843	845
16	Kosjerovo						784	668
17	Kriškovci						740	577
18	Laktaši			1,015	1,415	2,607	3,483	5,879
19	Ljubatovci						429	256
20	Maglajani						1,490	1,596
21	Mahovljani						877	924
22	Malo Blaško						591	666
23	Milosavci						595	482
24	Miloševci						345	265
25	Mrčevci						735	680
26	Papažani						469	375
27	Petoševci						499	576
28	Šeškovci						412	310
29	Slatina						1,153	1,344
30	Šušnjari						678	713
31	Trn						3,554	5,544
32	Veliko Blaško						948	1,408

=== Ethnic composition ===
Ethnic composition – Laktaši town
Nationality	2013.	1991.	1981.	1971.
Total	5,879 (100,0%)	3,483 (100,0%)	2,607 (100,0%)	1,415 (100,0%)
Serbs		2,866 (82,29%)	1,879 (72,08%)	1,229 (86,86%)
Yugoslavs		345 (9,905%)	538 (20,64%)	11 (0,777%)
Others		134 (3,847%)	75 (2,877%)	50 (3,534%)
Croats		99 (2,842%)	79 (3,030%)	77 (5,442%)
Bosniaks		39 (1,120%)	15 (0,575%)	28 (1,979%)
Montenegrins			16 (0,614%)	15 (1,060%)
Macedonians			3 (0,115%)	
Albanians			2 (0,077%)	1 (0,071%)
Slovenes				4 (0,283%)

Ethnic composition – Laktaši municipality
Nationality	2013.	1991.	1981.	1971.
Total	34,966 (100,0%)	29,832 (100,0%)	27,676 (100,0%)	25,997 (100,0%)
Serbs	33,462 (95,70%)	24,176 (81,04%)	21,642 (78,20%)	21,986 (84,57%)
Others	871 (2,491%)	1,153 (3,865%)	753 (2,721%)	707 (2,720%)
Croats	521 (1,490%)	2,565 (8,598%)	2,512 (9,076%)	2,731 (10,51%)
Bosniaks	112 (0,320%)	408 (1,368%)	245 (0,885%)	341 (1,312%)
Yugoslavs		1 530 (5,129%)	2,260 (8,166%)	84 (0,323%)
Roma			192 (0,694%)	
Slovenes			35 (0,126%)	106 (0,408%)
Montenegrins			28 (0,101%)	34 (0,131%)
Macedonians			7 (0,025%)	3 (0,012%)
Albanians			2 (0,007%)	5 (0,019%)

== Economy ==
The following table gives a preview of total number of registered employed people per their core activity (as of 2016):

Activity	Total
Agriculture, forestry and fishing	261
Mining and quarrying	17
Manufacturing	2,754
Distribution of power, gas, steam and air-conditioning	124
Distribution of water and water waste management	135
Construction	925
Wholesale and retail, repair	2,784
Transportation and storage	437
Hotels and restaurants	365
Information and communication	17
Finance and insurance	20
Real estate activities	2
Professional, scientific and technical activities	26
Administrative and support services	5
Public administration and defence	162
Education	225
Healthcare and social work	146
Art, entertainment and recreation	54
Other service activities	36
Total	8,495

== Sport ==
The most prominently known local sports team is basketball team KK Igokea based in Aleksandrovac. KK Igokea is a regular competitor in the regional Adriatic League and one of the two teams from Bosnia and Herzegovina that played in EuroCup. The local football club, FK Laktaši, plays in the First League of Republika Srpska.

== Twin towns – sister cities ==
Laktaši is twinned with:

- Budva, Montenegro
- Čajetina, Serbia

Other forms of cooperation:

- Lehavim, Israel
- Seiersberg-Pirka, Austria
- Veria, Greece
- Zrenjanin, Serbia

== See also ==
- Municipalities of Republika Srpska
- Laktaši Sports Hall
