= FK Tekstilac Derventa =

Tekstilac Derventa
- Full name: Fudbalski klub Tekstilac Derventa
- Nickname: Krojači (The Tailors)
- Founded: 1919
- Ground: Gradski stadion
- Capacity: 1,500
- Chairman: Predrag Drinić
- Manager: Mile Lazarević
- League: First League of RS
- 2021–22: First League of RS, 9th
Home colours	Away colours

Fudbalski klub Tekstilac Derventa (Serbian Cyrillic: Фудбалски клуб Teкcтилaц Дepвeнтa) is a professional association football club from the town of Derventa, Republika Srpska that is situated in Bosnia and Herzegovina.

Tekstilac currently plays in the First League of the Republika Srpska and plays its home matches on the Derventa City Stadium which has a capacity of 1,500 seats.

== History ==
Former players of Tekstilac Derventa: Alija Vejzović, Nezir Crnčević and Ramo Slomić

The first football club in Derventa before World War II was FK Dečko which was formed before FK Tekstilac. After World War II FK Dečko merged into FK Tekstilac Derventa.

In the history of FK Tekstilac Derventa, the teams which played between 1960 and 1968 will be remembered. The creator and leader of this team was the attacker Faruk Tarabar. He had football experience and pedagogical skills. He managed to compose the talent and skill of that Tekstilac generation.

Those teams brought their fans to the stadium to cheer for FK Tekstilac. Fans came to games in numbers and players of Tekstilac.

The old badge, used in the 1980s until the end of the 1991–1992 season.

The start of the series in 1966/67 was memorable because Tekstilac, in the first three matches, beat first team of FK Radnik Bijeljina with 5:0, then in next game they did the same thing to team of NK Zvijezda Gradačac (also they beat them 5:0), and in third match Tekstilac beat FK Budućnost Banovići in Banovići with 5:1.

Unfortunately, many of the players and member of the board of directors are not alive today, like Nikica Sirovina, Faruk Tarabar, Haso Kapetanović, Kemal "Spazo" Buzadžić, Nezir "Benco" Crnčević. Many of them also were refugees from Derventa: Ramo Slomić, Alija Vejzović and Mesud Jegić who all live in Sweden today. Emin Nakić and Pavek are in the United States, Zvonko Bošnjak, Suljko and others are in Germany.

From other generations there was Branko Janković a player of both Handball (RK Derventa) and football (Tekstilac).

== Players ==
=== Current squad ===
As of 23 May 2023

Note: Flags indicate national team as defined under FIFA eligibility rules; some limited exceptions apply. Players may hold more than one non-FIFA nationality.

No.	Pos.	Nation	Player
1	GK	BIH	Igor Marković
2	DF	BIH	Dušan Marić (Bosnian footballer) (captain)
4	DF	BIH	Sasa Đjekić
5	DF	SRB	Dragan Jolović
6	MF	BIH	Saša Đuričić (Bosnian footballer)
7	MF	BRA	Albert Abnner
8	MF	SRB	Uros Jovanović
9	FW	BIH	Ozren Perić
10	MF	BIH	Nebojsa Prljeta
11	FW	BIH	Zlatko Duspara

No.	Pos.	Nation	Player
12	GK	BIH	Neven Plisnić
13	DF	BIH	Dejan Ćorić
15	MF	BIH	Aleksandar Kusljić
16	FW	BIH	Srdjan Basić
17	MF	ARG	Marcos Ignacio Sosa
19	MF	BIH	Stefan Savić
20	FW	BIH	Danilo Ignjić
—	MF	BRA	Gustavo Gomes Ferreira
—	FW	BIH	Predrag Lejić

== Coaching staff ==
Position	Staff
Manager	(Bosnia and Herzegovina) Mile Lazarević
Assistant manager	(Bosnia and Herzegovina) Senad Smajić
Goalkeeping coach	(Bosnia and Herzegovina) Senad Smajić
Youth coach	(Bosnia and Herzegovina) Slađan Radanović
Youth coach	(Bosnia and Herzegovina) Slobodan Boban Kovačević
FK Tekstilac Derventa Academy coach	(Bosnia and Herzegovina) Dejan Pijetlović

Last updated: 26 August 2020
Source: FK Tekstilac Derventa official website

== Historical list of managers ==
- (Bosnia and Herzegovina) Faruk Tarabar
- (Bosnia and Herzegovina) Damir Porobić
- (Bosnia and Herzegovina) Radivoje "Rade" Vasiljević (Season 2000–2001)
- (Bosnia and Herzegovina) Predrag Drinić
- (Bosnia and Herzegovina) Edin "Dino" Porobić (Season 2009–2010)
- (Bosnia and Herzegovina) Slobodan Kovačević
- (Bosnia and Herzegovina) Mitar Lukić (2012–2014)
- (Bosnia and Herzegovina) Bojan Magazin (2014–2017)
- (Bosnia and Herzegovina) Zoran Dragišić (2017)
- (Bosnia and Herzegovina) Marko Stojić (2017–2018)
- (Bosnia and Herzegovina) Danimir Milkanović (2019–2020)
- (Bosnia and Herzegovina) Čedomir Ćulum (2020)
- (Bosnia and Herzegovina) Mile Lazarević (2020–present)
