= FK Željezničar Banja Luka =

Željezničar Banja Luka
- Full name: Fudbalski Klub Željezničar Banja Luka
- Founded: 1924; 102 years ago
- Ground: Predgrađe Stadium
- Capacity: 3,000
- Chairman: Branko Bašić
- Manager: Momir Zečević
- League: Second League of RS
- 2024–25: First League of RS, 15th of 18 (relegated)
- Website: http://fkzeljeznicarbl.com/
Home colours	Away colours

Fudbalski klub Željezničar Banja Luka (English: Football Club Željezničar Banja Luka) is a professional association football club from the city of Banja Luka that is situated in Bosnia and Herzegovina. It is one of the oldest clubs in the country.

The club currently plays in the Second League of the Republika Srpska and plays its home matches on the Predgrađe Stadium, which has a capacity of 3,000 seats.

== Honours ==
=== Domestic ===
==== League ====
- Second League of the Republika Srpska:
  - Winners (1): 2016–17 (west)
- Regional League of the Republika Srpska:
  - Winners (1): 2015–16 (west)

== Players ==
=== Current squad ===
As of 23 May 2023

Note: Flags indicate national team as defined under FIFA eligibility rules; some limited exceptions apply. Players may hold more than one non-FIFA nationality.

No.	Pos.	Nation	Player
3	DF	BIH	Aleksandar Jagodić
4	DF	BIH	Bojan Sladojević
5	DF	BIH	Marko Blanuša
6	MF	BIH	Đorđe Đogić
9	FW	BIH	Stefan Kerezović
10	MF	BIH	Nikola Ivić
11	FW	BIH	Nikola Šuput
12	GK	BIH	Veljko Tamidžija
13	DF	BIH	Nikola Jovandić
15	MF	USA	Alonzo Peart

No.	Pos.	Nation	Player
17	MF	BIH	David Gajić
18	MF	BIH	Sergej Kalabić
19	FW	SRB	Mihajlo Kosta
22	DF	BIH	Milan Jević
30	MF	BIH	Andrej Ratković
77	GK	BIH	Aleksa Stupar
—	DF	BIH	Đorđe Janković
—	FW	BIH	Ognjen Stijaković

=== Notable players ===
- (Bosnia and Herzegovina) Branislav Krunić
- (Bosnia and Herzegovina) Luka Kulenović
