= FK Zvijezda 09 =

- Full name: Fudbalski klub Zvijezda 09 Etno Selo Stanišići
- Founded: 2009; 17 years ago
- Ground: Ugljevik City Stadium
- Capacity: 4,200
- Chairman: Boris Stanišić
- Manager: Nebojša Đekanović
- League: First League of RS
- 2025–26: First League of RS, 7th of 13
- Website: fkzvijezda09.com
Home colours	Away colours	Third colours

Fudbalski klub Zvijezda 09 (Serbian Cyrillic: Фудбалски клуб Звијезда 09) is a professional association football club based in Ugljevik, Bosnia and Herzegovina.

Zvijezda 09 currently plays in the First League of the Republika Srpska. The club plays its home matches at the Ugljevik City Stadium, which has a capacity of 5,000 seats.

== History ==
Zvijezda 09 was founded in 2009, and have consistently risen through the football pyramid of Bosnia and Herzegovina.

They played in the seventh tier of football in the 2010–11 season, and then turned out in the country's Premier League with six promotions in eight years. In their first ever Bosnian Premier League season, the 2018–19 season, Zvijezda 09 finished in ninth place, escaping relegation. In the 2019–20 Bosnian Premier League season, the club got relegated back to the First League of RS after finishing in 12th place.

Zvijezda 09 was promoted back to the Premier League in the 2022–23 First League of RS season. However, the club got relegated again in the 2023–24 Bosnian Premier League season.

== Honours ==
=== Domestic ===
==== League ====
- First League of the Republika Srpska:
  - Winners (1): 2017–18

==== Cups ====
- Republika Srpska Cup:
  - Winners (1): 2023–24

== Players ==
=== Current squad ===
As of 19 September 2024

Note: Flags indicate national team as defined under FIFA eligibility rules; some limited exceptions apply. Players may hold more than one non-FIFA nationality.

No.	Pos.	Nation	Player
1	GK	BIH	Lazar Kulić
2	DF	BIH	Luka Janković
4	DF	BIH	Bojan Makarić
5	DF	BIH	Predrag Ristanović
6	DF	BIH	Nikola Đurić
7	FW	SRB	Nikola Njamculović
8	MF	BIH	Sergej Damjanić
10	MF	BIH	Aleksa Raca
11	FW	SRB	Nikola Komazec
13	DF	BIH	Mladen Dujković (Captain)

No.	Pos.	Nation	Player
14	DF	BIH	Milenko Andrić
16	MF	SRB	Dimitrije Petronijević
21	FW	SRB	Aleksandar Mitrović
22	FW	SRB	Srđan Kočić
23	MF	BIH	Goran Milovanović
25	FW	SRB	Branislav Marković
33	MF	BIH	Luka Radović
36	DF	BIH	Srđan Vulić
83	GK	SRB	Danilo Dulčić

=== Out on loan ===
Note: Flags indicate national team as defined under FIFA eligibility rules; some limited exceptions apply. Players may hold more than one non-FIFA nationality.

No.	Pos.	Nation	Player
—	GK	BIH	Luka Damjanović (at AS Trenčín until 30 June 2025)

== Managerial history ==
- (Bosnia and Herzegovina) Mladen Obrenović (23 August 2016 – 14 June 2017)
- (Bosnia and Herzegovina) Mile Lazarević (15 June 2017 – 13 November 2017)
- (Bosnia and Herzegovina) Mladen Obrenović (14 November 2017 – 1 December 2017)
- (Bosnia and Herzegovina) Dragan Mićić (28 December 2017 – 26 February 2018)
- (Serbia) Miodrag Pantelić (26 February 2018 – 6 June 2018)
- (Serbia) Milan Đuričić (14 June 2018 – 4 September 2018)
- (Bosnia and Herzegovina) Darko Nestorović (5 September 2018 – 11 March 2019)
- (Bosnia and Herzegovina) Milenko Bošnjaković (18 March 2019 – 27 May 2019)
- (Bosnia and Herzegovina) Boris Savić (27 May 2019 – 31 August 2019)
- (Montenegro) Slavoljub Bubanja (6 September 2019 – 6 October 2019)
- (Bosnia and Herzegovina) Adnan Zildžović (9 October 2019 – 9 March 2020)
- (Serbia) Perica Ognjenović (9 March 2020 – 19 June 2020)
- (Bosnia and Herzegovina) Zumbul Mahalbašić (20 June 2020 – 4 September 2020)
- (Bosnia and Herzegovina) Mladen Obrenović (4 September 2020 – 31 March 2021)
- (Serbia) Igor Savić (7 April 2021 – 30 June 2021)
- (Bosnia and Herzegovina) Zlatko Krmpotić (1 July 2021 – 16 February 2022)
- (Bosnia and Herzegovina) Mile Lazarević (21 February 2022 – 1 June 2022)
- (Bosnia and Herzegovina) Dženan Hošić (20 June 2022 – 12 September 2022)
- (Bosnia and Herzegovina) Srđan Šušić (14 September 2022 – 12 February 2023)
- (Bosnia and Herzegovina) Toni Karačić (22 February 2023 – 15 June 2023)
- (Serbia) Mihajlo Jurasović (19 June 2023 – 15 November 2023)
- (Serbia) Darko Milisavljević (20 November 2023 (Note: Milisavljević served as caretaker manager until 31 December 2023, when he was hired on a permanent basis.) – 22 March 2024)
- (Bosnia and Herzegovina) Bojan Trkulja (27 March 2024 – 1 June 2025)
- (Bosnia and Herzegovina) Samir Smajlović (1 July 2025 – 13 October 2025)
- (Serbia) Vladislav Rosić (18 October 2025 – 31 December 2025)
- (Serbia) Dragan Ivanović (10 January 2026 – 27 April 2026)
- (Bosnia and Herzegovina) Nebojša Đekanović (27 April 2026 – present)
