= 2009 Changchun Yatai season =

Changchun Yatai F.C.
2009 season
- Chairman: Liu Yuming
- Manager: Li Shubin
- Chinese Super League: 2nd place
- Top goalscorer: Cao Tianbao (7)
- Highest home attendance: 15,000 vs Shandong Luneng, CSL, 26 August 2009
- Lowest home attendance: 10,500 vs Tianjin Teda, CSL, 23 May 2009; 10,500 vs Hangzhou Greentown, CSL, 2 July 2009
- Average home league attendance: 12,083

The 2009 Changchun Yatai season was Changchun Yatai's third consecutive season in the Chinese Super League since its debut season in 2007. This season Changchun Yatai participated in the Chinese Super League and AFC Champions League.

== Review and events ==
=== Monthly events ===
This is a list of the significant events to occur at the club during the 2009 season, presented in chronological order. This list does not include transfers, which are listed in the transfers section below, or match results, which are in the results section.

March:

- 22 – Played first match in 2009 season at Helong Stadium. Zong Lei won the player of the match, after a 0–0 draw with Changsha Ginde.
- 28 – Caballero and Subasic left to compete in WCQ for national team. Tang Jing headed in an indirect freekick assisted by Captain Du Zhenyu. It is the first goal for Changchun Yatai and the first win in season 2009.
- 29 – Announce to play home games in Changchun Economics Development Area Stadium.

May:

- 10 – Lost 2–6 in the home game against Beijing Guoan. It is the biggest defeat since Changchun promoted into Chinese Super League.
- 25 – Changchun Yatai U-15 team were crowned Champions of China and will be joining the rest of finalists in Manchester United Premier Cup this summer.

June:

- 1 – Cao Tianbao make his debut for China against Iran.
- 28 – After 1170 minutes' goal drought, Branimir Subašić score twice in first half. Later in the second half of the game, the home team Dalian Shide scored 3 goals and take the 3 points.
- 29 – Branimir Subašić retired from international football on 29 June 2009.

July:

- 7 – Changchun Yatai was praised for the good performance in the first half season summary of the league by FA.
- 17 – The club held trials for U-13 team. About 150 players take part in the trials.
- 15 Changchun Yatai U19 team finish second in Chinese U–19 League 2009.
- 25 – Yan Feng was called up into Gao Hongbo's squad to face Kyrgyzstan in a 3–0 win on 25 July 2009.

September:

- 2 Changchun Yatai U17 team win Chinese U–17 League 2009 with 5 wins 1 draw and 1 loss.

== Squad details ==
=== Players information ===
(As to 20 September 2009, Club Apps/Goals before 2009 season are not accurate.)

| No. | Name | Nat. | Place of birth | Date of birth | Club apps. | Club goals | Int. caps | Int. goals | Previous club | Date joined | Fee |
|---|---|---|---|---|---|---|---|---|---|---|---|
| 1 | Zong Lei | (China) | Tianjin | 26 July 1981 | 89 | 0 | 12 | 0 | Shandong Luneng | 2006 | CNY, 000,000 |
| 2 | Wang Wanpeng | (China) | Dalian | 9 June 1982 | 89 | 2 | 1 | 0 | Youth Team | - | – |
| 3 | Tang Jing | (China) | Wuxi | 14 February 1975 | 73 | 4 | 0 | 0 | Sichuan Guancheng | 1 March 2006 | Undisclosed |
| 4 | Samuel Caballero | (Honduras) | Puerto Lempira | 24 December 1974 | 103 | 9 | 70 | 11 | Chicago Fire | 5 March 2006 | Undisclosed |
| 5 | Matt McKay | (Australia) | Brisbane | 11 January 1983 | 15 | 0 | 3 | 0 | Queensland Roar | 16 March 2009 | Loan |
| 6 | Wang Dong | (China) | Qingdao | 10 September 1981 | 165 | 54 | 30 | 4 | Shanghai Pudong | 2001 | Undisclosed |
| 7 | Jiang Pengxiang | (China) | Shenyang | 9 February 1981 | 146 | 8 | 0 | 0 | Youth Team | - | – |
| 8 | Du Zhenyu | (China) | Shenyang | 10 February 1983 | 156 | 66 | 24 | 2 | Youth Team | - | – |
| 9 | Elvis Scott | (Honduras) | Puerto Cortés | 1 August 1978 | 54 | 21 | 1 | 0 | Beijing Guoan | 18 March 2009 | Undisclosed |
| 10 | Branimir Subasic | (Azerbaijan) | Belgrade | 4 July 1982 | 20 | 3 | 26 | 6 | Red Star | 18 March 2009 | Undisclosed |
| 11 | Zhang Wenzhao | (China) | Anshan | 28 May 1987 | 8 | 0 | 0 | 0 | Shenzhen | 20 February 2009 | Undisclosed |
| 12 | Gabriel Melkam | (Nigeria) | Lagos | 13 March 1980 | 40 | 4 | 0 | 0 | Xiamen Lanshi | 12 January 2008 | Undisclosed |
| 13 | Liu Cheng | (China) | Shenyang | 15 October 1985 | 24 | 0 | 0 | 0 | - | - | – |
| 14 | Cao Tianbao | (China) | Shenyang | 3 April 1982 | 154 | 47 | 1 | 0 | Youth Team | - | – |
| 15 | Yang Haibo | (China) | Shenyang | 2 December 1981 | 93 | 0 | 0 | 0 | Youth Team | - | – |
| 16 | Li Bin | (China) | Beijing | 13 May 1981 | 102 | 2 | 0 | 0 | Youth Team | - | – |
| 17 | Huang Jie | (China) | Shanghai | 7 February 1989 | 23 | 1 | 0 | 0 | Shanghai Shenhua | April 2007 | CNY 1,300,000 |
| 18 | An Qi | (China) | Dalian | 21 June 1981 | 1 | 0 | 9 | 0 | Xiamen Lanshi | 9 January 2007 | Undisclosed |
| 19 | Tang Tao | (China) | - | 1 August 1987 | 0 | 0 | 0 | 0 | Youth Team | - | – |
| 20 | Zhang Baofeng | (China) | Shenyang | 23 June 1981 | 117 | 6 | 0 | 0 | Youth Team | - | – |
| 21 | Liu Weidong | (China) | Changchun | 29 January 1987 | 24 | 3 | 0 | 0 | Youth Team | - | – |
| 22 | Wang Peng | (China) | - | 19 September 1989 | 0 | 0 | 0 | 0 | - | - | – |
| 23 | Zhang Xiaofei | (China) | Shenyang | 11 July 1982 | 156 | 1 | 7 | 0 | Youth Team | - | – |
| 24 | Yan Feng | (China) | Dalian | 7 February 1982 | 92 | 6 | 1 | 0 | Sichuan Guancheng | March 2006 | CNY 1,300,000 |
| 25 | Lü Jianjun | (China) | Dalian | 1 August 1985 | 18 | 1 | 0 | 0 | Harbin Yiteng | January 2008 | CNY 1,000,000 |
| 26 | Ai Zhibo | (China) | Wuhan | 29 October 1982 | 4 | 1 | 0 | 0 | Wuhan Guanggu | 28 February 2009 | Undisclosed |
| 27 | Gao Jian | (China) | Shenyang | 10 August 1982 | 94 | 14 | 0 | 0 | Youth Team | - | – |
| 28 | Mi Tianhe | (China) | Changchun | 5 January 1983 | 10 | 0 | 0 | 0 | Youth Team | - | – |
| 29 | Zhang Tianhan | (China) | Shenyang | 22 October 1987 | 4 | 0 | 0 | 0 | Qingdao Jonoon | January 2008 | Undisclosed |
| 30 | Liu Xiaodong | (China) | Changchun | 14 January 1987 | 30 | 3 | 0 | 0 | Youth Team | - | – |
| 31 | Su Yang | (China) | Dalian | 1 December 1985 | 0 | 0 | 0 | 0 | Beijing Hongdeng | 20 February 2009 | Undisclosed |
| 32 | Wang Zhaochen | (China) | - | 19 October 1989 | 0 | 0 | 0 | 0 | Yantai Yiteng | - | – |
| 33 | Zhang Chao | (China) | - | 17 January 1989 | 0 | 0 | 0 | 0 | - | - | – |
| 34 | Sun Jie | (China) | - | 9 February 1991 | 0 | 0 | 0 | 0 | - | - | – |
| 35 | Shen Bo | (China) | Dalian | 12 March 1983 | 0 | 0 | 0 | 0 | Yantai Yiteng | 20 February 2009 | Undisclosed |
| 36 | Wang Huaqiang | (China) | - | 5 August 1988 | 0 | 0 | 0 | 0 | Liaoning | 20 February 2009 | Undisclosed |
| 37 | Pan Chaoran | (China) | - | 21 April 1992 | 0 | 0 | 0 | 0 | Youth Team | - | – |
| 38 | Ma Xiaohuan | (China) | Changchun | 18 July 1987 | 0 | 0 | 0 | 0 | Youth Team | - | – |
| 39 | Wang Rui | (China) | Shenyang | 23 April 1982 | 94 | 12 | 0 | 0 | Youth Team | - | – |
| 40 | Zhang Liangxi | (China) | - | 6 June 1989 | 0 | 0 | 0 | 0 | Youth Team | - | – |
| 41 | Liu Yisi | (China) | - | 24 March 1988 | 0 | 0 | 0 | 0 | Youth Team | - | – |
| 42 | Li Xiongchi | (China) | Dalian | 9 September 1990 | 0 | 0 | 0 | 0 | Youth Team | - | – |
| 43 | Wang Tong | (China) | - | 30 January 1989 | 0 | 0 | 0 | 0 | Youth Team | - | – |
| 44 | Yuan Lujiang | (China) | - | 8 June 1989 | 0 | 0 | 0 | 0 | Youth Team | - | – |
| 45 | Ricardo Steer | (Colombia) | – | 8 June 1982 | 8 | 0 | 0 | 0 | Brujas F.C. | 24 July 2009 | Loan |
| 46 | Sadriddin Abdullaev | (Uzbekistan) | – | 11 June 1986 | 5 | 0 | 1 | 0 | Pakhtakor Tashkent | 24 July 2009 | Loan |
| 47 | Yao Bo | (China) | - | 31 January 1990 | 0 | 0 | 0 | 0 | Hubei Greenery | 24 July 2009 | Undisclosed |

=== Kit profile ===
Supplier: Nike
Sponsor(s): Home – 东北证券
Sponsor: Away – 东北证券

| Home Strip | Away Strip |

== Matches ==
=== Chinese Super League ===
2009-03-22
15:30 GMT+8

| Changsha Ginde | 0–0 | Changchun Yatai |
|---|---|---|
| Xu Bo (yellow card) 35' Wang Fei (substituted on) Jéfferson Feijão (substituted off) 66'; Billy Mwanza (substituted on) Sim Jae-Won (substituted off) 86' | (report) | Jiang Pengxiang (yellow card) 21'; Yan Feng (yellow card) 24'; Tang Jing (yellow card) 42' Matt McKay (substituted on) Yan Feng (substituted off) 59'; Elvis Scott (substituted on) Branimir Subasic (substituted off) 59'; Lü Jianjun (substituted on) Liu Xiaodong (substituted off) 81' |

Helong Stadium, Changsha
Attendance: 8000
Referee: Huang Junjie
Man of Match: Zong Lei

2009-03-28
15:30 GMT+8

| Jiangsu Sainty | 0–1 | Changchun Yatai |
|---|---|---|
| Léiner Gómez (penalty missed) Eleílson (yellow card) 73'; Carlos Ceballos (yellow card) 87' Wang Yang (substituted on) Léiner Gómez (substituted off) 80'; Sun Ke (substituted on) Alexander Kletskov (substituted off) 80' | (report) | Tang Jing 73' Matt McKay (yellow card) 41'; Jiang Pengxiang (yellow card) 48' Zhang Wenzhao (substituted on) Cao Tianbao (substituted off) 75'; Ai Zhibo (substituted on) Yan Feng (substituted off) 90'; Liu Xiaodong (substituted on) Matt McKay (substituted off) 91+' |

Nanjing Olympic Sports Center, Nanjing
Attendance: 21000
Referee: Zhao Liang
Man of Match: Tang Jing

2009-04-05
15:30 GMT+8

| Changchun Yatai | 2–0 | Chengdu Blades |
|---|---|---|
| Jiang Pengxiang 85'; Du Zhenyu 88' Jiang Pengxiang (yellow card) 59'; Gabriel Melkam (yellow card) 71' Cao Tianbao (substituted on) Elvis Scott (substituted off) 51'; Samuel Caballero (substituted on) Tang Jing (substituted off) 57'; Liu Xiaodong (substituted on) Matt McKay (substituted off) 80' | (report) | #44 (yellow card) 54'; Liu Cheng (yellow card) 62'; Rodrigues (yellow card) 70' Fu Bin (substituted on) Lan Yi (substituted off) 9'; Wang Song (substituted on) Liang Mingri (substituted off) 87'; Zhao Mingxin (substituted on) Yao Xia (substituted off) 92+' |

Changchun Economics Development Area Stadium, Changchun
Attendance: 12000
Referee: Zhang Zhengping
Man of Match: Du Zhenyu

2009-04-12
19:30 GMT+8

| Shandong Luneng | 3–2 | Changchun Yatai |
|---|---|---|
| Li Jinyu 28'; Aleksandar Živković 60'(Pen), 75' Li Leilei (yellow card) 77' Wang Xiaolong (substituted on) Wang Yongpo (substituted off) 63'; Liu Zhao (substituted on) Li Jinyu (substituted off) 77'; Jiao Zhe (substituted on) Lü Zheng (substituted off) 89' | (report) | Samuel Caballero 48'; Cao Tianbao 55' Yan Feng (yellow card) 21'; Wang Wanpeng (yellow card) 49' Zhang Wenzhao (substituted on) Du Zhenyu (substituted off) 46'; Elvis Scott (substituted on) Gabriel Melkam (substituted off) 80'; Ai Zhibo (substituted on) Cao Tianbao (substituted off) 80' |

Shandong Stadium, Shandong
Attendance: 21735
Referee: Huang Junjie
Man of Match: Lü Zheng

2009-04-18
15:30 GMT+8

| Changchun Yatai | 0–0 | Shaanxi Chan-Ba |
|---|---|---|
| Yan Feng (yellow card) 38'; Tang Jing (yellow card) 78' Elvis Scott (substituted on) Branimir Subasic (substituted off) 71'; Liu Xiaodong (substituted on) Matt McKay (substituted off) 71'; Gao Jian (substituted on) Yan Feng (substituted off) 79' | (report) | Wang Yun (yellow card) 20'; Yu Hai (yellow card) 43' Wang Peng (substituted on) Ma Erwen (substituted off) 68'; Zhu Jiawei (substituted on) Yu Hai (substituted off) 73'; Li Yan (substituted on) Li Yi (substituted off) 89' |

Changchun Economics Development Area Stadium, Changchun
Attendance: 11317
Referee: Li Yuhong
Man of Match: Samuel Caballero

2009-04-26
15:30 GMT+8

| Changchun Yatai | 1–0 | Shanghai Shenhua |
|---|---|---|
| Cao Tianbao 31' Branimir Subasic (yellow card) 33'; Zong Lei (yellow card) 55'; Gabriel Melkam (yellow card) 81'; Gao Jian (yellow card) 92+' Gao Jian (substituted on) Liu Weidong (substituted off) 67'; Elvis Scott (substituted on) Branimir Subasic (substituted off) 70'; Matt McKay (substituted on) Yan Feng (substituted off) 85' | (report) | Aleksander Rodić (yellow card) 11'; Yu Tao (yellow card) 37' (red card) 51'; Shen Longyuan (yellow card) 58'; Chen Tao (yellow card) 81'; Mark Milligan (yellow card) 86' Hernán Barcos (substituted on) Yanko Vâlkanov (substituted off) 50'; Wang Hongliang (substituted on) Gao Lin (substituted off) 78' |

Changchun Economics Development Area Stadium, Changchun
Attendance: 12300
Referee: Zhang Lei
Man of Match: Cao Tianbao

2009-05-02
14:00 GMT+8

| Changchun Yatai | 3–1 | Shenzhen Asia Travel |
|---|---|---|
| Cao Tianbao 40', 47'; Ai Zhibo 86' Du Zhenyu (yellow card) 23'; Wang Wanpeng (yellow card) 90' Matt McKay (substituted on) Yan Feng (substituted off) 17'; Scott Elvis (substituted on) Branimir Subasic (substituted off) 62'; Yang Haibo (substituted on) Zhang Xiaofei (substituted off) 89' | (report) | Huang Fengtao 7' Li Fei (yellow card) 18'; Aleksey Nikolaev (yellow card) 76' Li Xin (substituted on) Huang Fengtao (substituted off) 77'; Zhi Yaqi (substituted on) Augusto (substituted off) 78' |

Changchun Economics Development Area Stadium, Changchun
Attendance: 12400
Referee: Fan Qi
Man of Match: Cao Tianbao

2009-05-10
15:30 GMT+8

| Changchun Yatai | 2–6 | Beijing Guoan |
|---|---|---|
| Cao Tianbao 81'; Elvis Scott 92+' Yang Haibo (substituted on) Tang Jing (substituted off) 46'; Zhang Tianhan (substituted on) Liu Xiaodong (substituted off) 46'; Scott Elvis (substituted on) Branimir Subasic (substituted off) 66' | (report) | Yang Hao 21'; Ryan Griffiths 31', 49'; Yan Xiangchuang 55', 85'; Sui Dongliang 69' Yang Zhi (yellow card) 90' Sui Dongliang (substituted on) Yang Hao (substituted off) 46'; Du Wenhui (substituted on) Ryan Griffiths (substituted off) 61'; Lang Zheng (substituted on) Yang Pu (substituted off) 73' |

Changchun Economics Development Area Stadium, Changchun
Attendance: 12900
Referee: Huang Junjie
Man of Match: Yan Xiangchuang

2009-05-16
15:30 GMT+8

| Qingdao Jonoon | 2–1 | Changchun Yatai |
|---|---|---|
| Qu Bo 28'; Zheng Long 70' Qu Bo (yellow card) 18'; Xu Jingjie (yellow card) 65' | (report) | Elvis Scott 34' Tang Jing (yellow card) 40'; Zhang Wenzhao (yellow card) 61'; Zhang Tianhan (yellow card) 89' Zhang Wenzhao (substituted on) Liu Weidong (substituted off) 57'; Liu Xiaodong (substituted on) Matt McKay (substituted off) 65'; Zhang Tianhan (substituted on) Gabriel Melkam (substituted off) 72' |

Yizhong Center, Qingdao
Attendance: 8300
Referee: Chen Honghui
Man of Match: Qu Bo

2009-05-23
19:30 GMT+8

| Changchun Yatai | 1–0 | Tianjin Teda |
|---|---|---|
| Cao Tianbao 66' Liu Xiaodong (yellow card) 25'; Liu Weidong (yellow card) 52' Matt McKay (substituted on) Liu Xiaodong (substituted off) 46'; Zhang Wenzhao (substituted on) Liu Weidong (substituted off) 64'; Tang Jing (substituted on) Liu Cheng (substituted off) 86' | (report) | Damiano Tommasi (yellow card) 30'; Cao Yang (yellow card) 54' Han Yanming (substituted on) Zhang Shuo (substituted off) 64'; Ma Leilei (substituted on) Hao Junmin (substituted off) 72'; Mao Biao (substituted on) Éber Luís (substituted off) 79' |

Changchun Economics Development Area Stadium, Changchun
Attendance: 10500
Referee: He Zhibiao
Man of Match: Cao Tianbao

2009-06-13
19:30 GMT+8

| Henan Construction | 1–0 | Changchun Yatai |
|---|---|---|
| Netto 81' Wang Bo (yellow card) 46+'; Zeng Cheng (yellow card) 70' Zhang Lu (substituted on) Jiang Kun (substituted off) 60'; Xiao Zhi (substituted on) Yang Shilin (substituted off) 68'; Zou You (substituted on) Xu Yang (substituted off) 90' | (report) | Matt McKay (yellow card) 8'; Samuel Caballero (yellow card) 59' Zhang Wenzhao (substituted on) Branimir Subasic (substituted off) 65'; Gao Jian (substituted on) Cao Tianbao (substituted off) 85' |

Zhengzhou Hanghai Stadium, Zhengzhou
Attendance: 16155
Referee: Zhao Liang
Man of Match: Netto

2009-06-20
19:30 GMT+8

| Changchun Yatai | 2–0 | Guangzhou GPC |
|---|---|---|
| Liu Xiaodong 11', 22' Elvis Scott (yellow card) 75' Gabriel Melkam (substituted on) Samuel Caballero (substituted off) 46'; Gao Jian (substituted on) Elvis Scott (substituted off) 78'; Zhang Wenzhao (substituted on) Branimir Subasic (substituted off) 86' | (report) | Zhou Lin (yellow card) 40' Ismael Enrique Alvarado (substituted on) Diego (substituted off) 46'; Huang Zhiyi (substituted on) Ismael Enrique Alvarado (substituted off) 52' |

Changchun Economics Development Area Stadium, Changchun
Attendance: 11000
Referee: Tao Rancheng
Man of Match: Liu Xiaodong

2009-06-28
16:30 GMT+8

| Dalian Shide | 3–2 | Changchun Yatai |
|---|---|---|
| James Chamanga 59', 73'; Ahn Jung-Hwan 66' Zhao Xuri (yellow card) 6'; Adán Vergara (yellow card) 82'; Li Xuepeng (yellow card) 90' Lü Peng (substituted on) Jeon Woo-Keun (substituted off) 44'; Ahn Jung-Hwan (substituted on) Zhang Yaokun (substituted off) 52'; Liu Yujian (substituted on) Wang Sheng (substituted off) 59' | (report) | Branimir Subasic 29', 41' Matt McKay (yellow card) 46'; Yan Feng (yellow card) 90' Yan Feng (substituted on) Liu Xiaodong (substituted off) 55'; Liu Weidong (substituted on) Branimir Subasic (substituted off) 67'; Jiang Pengxiang (substituted on) Lü Jianjun (substituted off) 76' |

Jinzhou Stadium, Dalian
Attendance: 12000
Referee: Yao Qing
Man of Match: James Chamanga

2009-07-02
15:30 GMT+8

| Changchun Yatai | 2–0 | Hangzhou Greentown |
|---|---|---|
| Elvis Scott 14'; Gabriel Melkam 92+' Wang Wanpeng (yellow card) 47'; Gao Jian (yellow card) 80'; Branimir Subasic (yellow card) 90' Gao Jian (substituted on) Elvis Scott (substituted off) 62'; Samuel Caballero (substituted on) Liu Xiaodong (substituted off) 68'; Zhang Baofeng (substituted on) Matt McKay (substituted off) 91+' | (report) | Chang Lin (yellow card) 31'; Cao Xuan (yellow card) 66'; Yang Fusheng (yellow card) 75'; Jiao Fengbo (yellow card) 76' Otto (substituted on) Tan Yang (substituted off) 36'; Cai Chuchuan (substituted on) Wang Hongyou (substituted off) 46'; Yan Song (substituted on) Chang Lin (substituted off) 65' |

Changchun Economics Development Area Stadium, Changchun
Attendance: 10500
Referee: Huang Junjie
Man of Match: Gabriel Melkam

2009-07-05
19:30 GMT+8

| Chongqing Lifan | 0–0 | Changchun Yatai |
|---|---|---|
| Xia Jin (substituted on) Zhou Heng (substituted off) 19'; Wu Peng (substituted on) Wu Qing (substituted off) 46' | (report) | Branimir Subasic (yellow card) 49'; Liu Xiaodong (yellow card) 67' Zhang Baofeng (substituted on) Gabriel Melkam (substituted off) 46'; Yan Feng (substituted on) Jiang Pengxiang (substituted off) 61'; Zhang Wenzhao (substituted on) Branimir Subasic (substituted off) 69' |

Chongqing Olympic Sports Center, Chongqing
Attendance: 8000
Referee: Tan Hai
Man of Match: Yu Yongzhe

2009-08-02
15:30 GMT+8

| Changchun Yatai | 1–1 | Changsha Ginde |
|---|---|---|
| Gao Jian 78' Wang Wanpeng (yellow card) 23'; Cao Tianbao (yellow card) 58'; Yan Feng (yellow card) 61'; An Qi (yellow card) 89' Gao Jian (substituted on) Branimir Subasic (substituted off) 57'; Sadriddin Abdullaev (substituted on) Liu Weidong (substituted off) 57'; Liu Xiaodong (substituted on) Yan Feng (substituted off) 67' | (report) | Wen Huyi 46' Li Wenbo (yellow card) 70'; Liu Jianye (yellow card) 93+'; Billy Mwanza (yellow card) 94+' Lee Sang-Il (substituted on) Zhang Xiaobin (substituted off) 66'; Wang Fei (substituted on) Xu Bo (substituted off) 83' |

Changchun Economics Development Area Stadium, Changchun
Attendance: 13000
Referee: Zhao Liang
Man of Match: Samuel Caballero

2009-08-08
19:30 GMT+8

| Changchun Yatai | 0–0 | Jiangsu Sainty |
|---|---|---|
| Zhang Xiaofei (yellow card) 58' Liu Xiaodong (substituted on) Tang Jing (substituted off) 60'; Gao Jian (substituted on) Cao Tianbao (substituted off) 71'; Sadriddin Abdullaev (substituted on) Liu Weidong (substituted off) 80' | (report) | Eleílson (yellow card) 30'; Alexander Kletskov (yellow card) 83' Wang Weilong (substituted on) Eleílson (substituted off) 54'; Tan Si (substituted on) Carlos Ceballos (substituted off) 64'; Cao Rui (substituted on) Deng Zhuoxiang (substituted off) 66' |

Changchun Economics Development Area Stadium, Changchun
Attendance: 12000
Referee: Chen Honghui
Man of Match: Ricardo Steer

2009-08-22
19:30 GMT+8

| Chengdu Blades | 2–1 | Changchun Yatai |
|---|---|---|
| Rodrigues 10'; Brendon Šantalab 75' Liu Cheng (yellow card) 27'; Fan Peipei (yellow card) 32'; Wang Song (yellow card) 33'; Li Gang (yellow card) 61'; Ji Mingyi (yellow card) 66' Zhang Yuan (substituted on) Rodrigues (substituted off) 63'; Brendon Šantalab (substituted on) Wang Song (substituted off) 63'; Oumar Kondé (substituted on) Sun Jihai (substituted off) 75' | (report) | Samuel Caballero 71' Zhang Xiaofei (yellow card) 54'; Sadriddin Abdullaev (yellow card) 61'; Yan Feng (yellow card) 76' Sadriddin Abdullaev (substituted on) Liu Weidong (substituted off) 46'; Branimir Subasic (substituted on) Gabriel Melkam (substituted off) 62'; Liu Xiaodong (substituted on) Yan Feng (substituted off) 80' |

Chengdu Sports Center, Chengdu
Attendance: 12000
Referee: Wan Daxue
Man of Match: Lan Yi

2009-08-26
19:30 GMT+8

| Changchun Yatai | 3–2 | Shandong Luneng |
|---|---|---|
| Yan Feng 8', 92+'; Liu Weidong 28' Liu Weidong (yellow card) 29'; Yan Feng (yellow card) 52'; Cao Tianbao (yellow card) 59'; Zhang Wenzhao (yellow card) 83' Zhang Wenzhao (substituted on) Liu Weidong (substituted off) 63'; Liu Xiaodong (substituted on) Gabriel Melkam (substituted off) 72'; Branimir Subasic (substituted on) Ricardo Steer (substituted off) 88' | (report) | Wang Yongpo 30'; Sandro 94+' Yuan Weiwei (yellow card) 18' Lü Zheng (substituted on) Han Peng (substituted off) 46'; Li Jinyu (substituted on) Aleksandar Živković (substituted off) 70'; Xia Ningning (substituted on) Roda Antar (substituted off) 85' |

Changchun Economics Development Area Stadium, Changchun
Attendance: 15000
Referee: Tao Rancheng
Man of Match: Yan Feng

2009-08-30
15:30 GMT+8

| Shaanxi Chan–Ba | 0–1 | Changchun Yatai |
|---|---|---|
| Jonas Salley (yellow card) 67' Vicente (substituted on) Estevão (substituted off) 27'; Wang Peng (substituted on) Yu Hai (substituted off) 64'; Zheng Wei (substituted on) Zheng Tao (substituted off) 82' | (report) | Branimir Subasic 21' Ricardo Steer (yellow card) 33'; Tang Jing (yellow card) 40'; Liu Xiaodong (yellow card) 73' Cao Tianbao (substituted on) Sadriddin Abdullaev (substituted off) 37'; Liu Cheng (substituted on) Liu Xiaodong (substituted off) 82'; Jiang Pengxiang (substituted on) Yan Feng (substituted off) 90' |

Shaanxi Coca-Cola Stadium, Xi'an
Attendance: 18000
Referee: Sun Baojie
Man of Match: Wang Erzhuo

2009-09-05
19:45 GMT+8

| Shanghai Shenhua | 0–0 | Changchun Yatai |
|---|---|---|
| Tao Jin (yellow card) 17'; Gao Lin (yellow card) 31' Yanko Vâlkanov (substituted on) Shen Longyuan (substituted off) 66'; Yin Xifu (substituted on) Tao Jin (substituted off) 73' | (report) | Liu Cheng (yellow card) 31'; Liu Weidong (yellow card) 34' Cao Tianbao (substituted on) Liu Xiaodong (substituted off) 67'; Lü Jianjun (substituted on) Jiang Pengxiang (substituted off) 68'; Samuel Caballero (substituted on) Branimir Subasic (substituted off) 80' |

Hongkou Stadium, Shanghai
Attendance: 13200
Referee: He Zhibiao
Man of Match: Du Wei

2009-09-12
19:45 GMT+8

| Shenzhen Asia Travel | 4–0 | Changchun Yatai |
|---|---|---|
| Hernán Barcos 11', 64', 78'; Marko Zorić 37' Liu Chao (yellow card) 35'; Li Fei (yellow card) 56'; Marko Zorić (yellow card) 71'; Chen Yongqiang (red card) 75' Zheng Bin (substituted on) Li Fei (substituted off) 55'; Yin Xiaolong (substituted on) Mao Jianqing (substituted off) 80'; Xiang Jun (substituted on) Massamasso Tchangai (substituted off) 85' | (report) | Tang Jing (yellow card) 18' Ricardo Steer (substituted on) Branimir Subasic (substituted off) 41'; Yang Haibo (substituted on) Tang Jing (substituted off) 46'; Wang Dong (substituted on) Gao Jian (substituted off) 59' |

Shenzhen Stadium, Shenzhen
Attendance: 10000
Referee: Sun Baojie
Man of Match: Hernán Barcos

2009-09-15
20:00 GMT+8

| Beijing Guoan | 0–2 | Changchun Yatai |
|---|---|---|
| Darko Matić (yellow card) 62'; Ryan Griffiths (yellow card) 78'; Lang Zheng (yellow card) 88' Tao Wei (substituted on) Zhang Xinxin (substituted off) 60'; Xue Fei (substituted on) Yang Hao (substituted on) 68'; Wang Changqing (substituted on) Emil Martínez (substituted off) 80' | (report) | Cao Tianbao 56'(pen); Gabriel Melkam 86' Zong Lei (yellow card) 74'; Gabriel Melkam (yellow card) 93+' Branimir Subasic (substituted on) Ricardo Steer (substituted off) 56'; Wang Dong (substituted on) Sadriddin Abdullaev (substituted off) 72'; Zhang Baofeng (substituted on) Yan Feng (substituted off) 90' |

Workers Stadium, Beijing
Attendance: 38000
Referee: Tao Rancheng
Man of Match: Gabriel Melkam

2009-09-20
19:30 GMT+8

| Changchun Yatai | 1–1 | Qingdao Jonoon |
|---|---|---|
| Liu Weidong 70' | (report) | Jiang Ning 15' |

Changchun Economics Development Area Stadium, Changchun
Referee:
Man of Match:

== Chinese Super League statistics ==
=== League table ===
| Pos | Team | Pld | W | D | L | GF | GA | GD | Pts | Qualification or relegation |
|---|---|---|---|---|---|---|---|---|---|---|
| 1 | Beijing Guoan (C) | 30 | 13 | 12 | 5 | 48 | 28 | +20 | 51 | AFC Champions League 2010 Group stage |
| 2 | Changchun Yatai | 30 | 14 | 8 | 8 | 38 | 31 | +7 | 50 | AFC Champions League 2010 Group stage |
| 3 | Henan Construction | 30 | 13 | 9 | 8 | 35 | 26 | +9 | 48 | AFC Champions League 2010 Group stage |
| 4 | Shandong Luneng | 30 | 11 | 12 | 7 | 35 | 30 | +5 | 45 (Note: Shandong: 9 pts, 7–4; Shanghai: 7 pts, 9–3; Tianjin: 1 pt, 1–10) | AFC Champions League 2010 Group stage |
| 5 | Shanghai Shenhua | 30 | 12 | 9 | 9 | 39 | 29 | +10 | 45 | |

Source: 2009 league table on the official site of the Chinese Super League
Rules for classification: 1st points; 2nd head-to-head points; 3rd head-to-head goal difference; 4th head-to-head goals scored; 5th goal difference; 6th goals scored; 7th disciplinary points (1 point for each yellow card, 3 points for each red card). Head-to-Head: used when head-to-head record is used to rank tied teams.
(C) Champions

=== Results summary ===
| Overall | | | | | | | | Home | | | | | | Away | | | | | |
| Pld | W | D | L | GF | GA | GD | Pts | W | D | L | GF | GA | GD | W | D | L | GF | GA | GD |
|---|---|---|---|---|---|---|---|---|---|---|---|---|---|---|---|---|---|---|---|
| 24 | 10 | 7 | 7 | 28 | 26 | +2 | 37 | 7 | 4 | 1 | 18 | 11 | +7 | 3 | 3 | 6 | 10 | 15 | −5 |

Last updated: 20 September 2009.
Source: Changchun Yatai Results

=== Round by round ===
| Round | 1 | 2 | 3 | 4 | 5 | 6 | 7 | 8 | 9 | 10 | 11 | 12 | 13 | 14 | 15 | 16 | 17 | 18 | 19 | 20 | 21 | 22 | 23 | 24 | 25 | 26 | 27 | 28 | 29 | 30 |
|---|---|---|---|---|---|---|---|---|---|---|---|---|---|---|---|---|---|---|---|---|---|---|---|---|---|---|---|---|---|---|
| Ground | A | A | H | A | H | H | H | H | A | H | A | H | A | H | A | H | H | A | H | A | A | A | A | H | A | H | A | H | A | H |
| Result | D | W | W | L | D | W | W | L | L | W | L | W | L | W | D | D | D | L | W | W | D | L | W | D | | | | | | |
| Position | 9 | 4 | 2 | 6 | 8 | 4 | 3 | 4 | 7 | 3 | 5 | 3 | 5 | 4 | 4 | 4 | 4 | 7 | 5 | 4 | 4 | 5 | 2 | 2 | | | | | | |

Updated to match(es) played on 20 September 2009. Source: Changchun Yatai Results
A = Away; H = Home; W = Win; D = Draw; L = Loss

== Season statistics ==
(As to 20 September 2009)

=== Starts and goals ===
| No. | Nat. | Position | Player | Total | | | Chinese Super League starts | | Chinese Super League subs |
| No. | Nat. | Position | Player | Apps | Goals | MoMs | Apps | Goals | Apps | Goals |
|---|---|---|---|---|---|---|---|---|---|---|
| 1 | (China) | GK | Zong Lei | 23 | 0 | 1 | 23 | 0 | 0 | 0 |
| 2 | (China) | DF | Wang Wanpeng | 22 | 0 | 0 | 22 | 0 | 0 | 0 |
| 3 | (China) | DF | Tang Jing | 16 | 1 | 1 | 15 | 1 | 1 | 0 |
| 4 | (Honduras) | DF | Samuel Caballero | 19 | 2 | 2 | 16 | 2 | 3 | 0 |
| 5 | (Australia) | MF | Matt McKay | 15 | 0 | 0 | 11 | 0 | 4 | 0 |
| 6 | (China) | MF | Wang Dong | 3 | 0 | 0 | 0 | 0 | 3 | 0 |
| 7 | (China) | MF | Jiang Pengxiang | 20 | 1 | 0 | 18 | 1 | 2 | 0 |
| 8 | (China) | FW | Du Zhenyu | 7 | 1 | 1 | 6 | 1 | 1 | 0 |
| 9 | (Honduras) | FW | Elvis Scott | 15 | 3 | 0 | 9 | 2 | 6 | 1 |
| 10 | (Azerbaijan) | MF | Branimir Subasic | 20 | 3 | 0 | 16 | 3 | 4 | 0 |
| 11 | (China) | FW | Zhang Wenzhao | 8 | 0 | 0 | 0 | 0 | 8 | 0 |
| 12 | (Nigeria) | DF | Gabriel Melkam | 20 | 2 | 2 | 19 | 2 | 1 | 0 |
| 13 | (China) | DF | Liu Cheng | 5 | 0 | 0 | 4 | 0 | 1 | 0 |
| 14 | (China) | FW | Cao Tianbao | 23 | 7 | 3 | 20 | 7 | 3 | 0 |
| 15 | (China) | MF | Yang Haibo | 5 | 0 | 0 | 2 | 0 | 3 | 0 |
| 16 | (China) | MF | Li Bin | 0 | 0 | 0 | 0 | 0 | 0 | 0 |
| 17 | (China) | MF | Huang Jie | 1 | 0 | 0 | 1 | 0 | 0 | 0 |
| 18 | (China) | GK | An Qi | 1 | 0 | 0 | 1 | 0 | 0 | 0 |
| 19 | (China) | MF | Tang Tao | 0 | 0 | 0 | 0 | 0 | 0 | 0 |
| 20 | (China) | DF | Zhang Baofeng | 5 | 0 | 0 | 2 | 0 | 3 | 0 |
| 21 | (China) | FW | Liu Weidong | 10 | 2 | 0 | 9 | 2 | 1 | 0 |
| 22 | (China) | GK | Wang Peng | 0 | 0 | 0 | 0 | 0 | 0 | 0 |
| 23 | (China) | MF | Zhang Xiaofei | 22 | 0 | 0 | 22 | 0 | 0 | 0 |
| 24 | (China) | MF | Yan Feng | 18 | 2 | 1 | 16 | 2 | 2 | 0 |
| 25 | (China) | MF | Lü Jianjun | 10 | 0 | 0 | 8 | 0 | 2 | 0 |
| 26 | (China) | DF | Ai Zhibo | 4 | 1 | 0 | 2 | 1 | 2 | 0 |
| 27 | (China) | FW | Gao Jian | 8 | 1 | 0 | 1 | 0 | 7 | 1 |
| 28 | (China) | GK | Mi Tianhe | 0 | 0 | 0 | 0 | 0 | 0 | 0 |
| 29 | (China) | MF | Zhang Tianhan | 2 | 0 | 0 | 0 | 0 | 2 | 0 |
| 30 | (China) | FW | Liu Xiaodong | 19 | 2 | 1 | 11 | 2 | 8 | 0 |
| 31 | (China) | MF | Su Yang | 0 | 0 | 0 | 0 | 0 | 0 | 0 |
| 32 | (China) | DF | Wang Zhaochen | 0 | 0 | 0 | 0 | 0 | 0 | 0 |
| 33 | (China) | DF | Zhang Chao | 0 | 0 | 0 | 0 | 0 | 0 | 0 |
| 34 | (China) | DF | Sun Jie | 0 | 0 | 0 | 0 | 0 | 0 | 0 |
| 35 | (China) | MF | Shen Bo | 0 | 0 | 0 | 0 | 0 | 0 | 0 |
| 36 | (China) | FW | Wang Huaqiang | 0 | 0 | 0 | 0 | 0 | 0 | 0 |
| 37 | (China) | FW | Pan Chaoran | 0 | 0 | 0 | 0 | 0 | 0 | 0 |
| 38 | (China) | MF | Ma Xiaohuan | 0 | 0 | 0 | 0 | 0 | 0 | 0 |
| 39 | (China) | FW | Wang Rui | 0 | 0 | 0 | 0 | 0 | 0 | 0 |
| 40 | (China) | MF | Zhang Liangxi | 0 | 0 | 0 | 0 | 0 | 0 | 0 |
| 41 | (China) | DF | Liu Yisi | 0 | 0 | 0 | 0 | 0 | 0 | 0 |
| 42 | (China) | MF | Li Xiongchi | 0 | 0 | 0 | 0 | 0 | 0 | 0 |
| 43 | (China) | MF | Wang Tong | 0 | 0 | 0 | 0 | 0 | 0 | 0 |
| 44 | (China) | GK | Yuan Lujiang | 0 | 0 | 0 | 0 | 0 | 0 | 0 |
| 45 | (Colombia) | FW | Ricardo Steer | 8 | 0 | 1 | 7 | 0 | 1 | 0 |
| 46 | (Uzbekistan) | MF | Sadriddin Abdullaev | 5 | 0 | 0 | 2 | 0 | 3 | 0 |
| 47 | (China) | FW | Yao Bo | 0 | 0 | 0 | 0 | 0 | 0 | 0 |

=== Goalscorers ===
| No. | Flag | Pos | Name | Chinese Super League | Total |
|---|---|---|---|---|---|
| 14 | (China) | FW | Cao Tianbao | 7 | 7 |
| 9 | (Honduras) | FW | Elvis Scott | 3 | 3 |
| 10 | (Azerbaijan) | MF | Branimir Subasic | 3 | 3 |
| 4 | (Honduras) | DF | Samuel Caballero | 2 | 2 |
| 12 | (Nigeria) | DF | Gabriel Melkam | 2 | 2 |
| 21 | (China) | FW | Liu Weidong | 2 | 2 |
| 24 | (China) | MF | Yan Feng | 2 | 2 |
| 30 | (China) | FW | Liu Xiaodong | 2 | 2 |
| 3 | (China) | DF | Tang Jing | 1 | 1 |
| 7 | (China) | MF | Jiang Pengxiang | 1 | 1 |
| 8 | (China) | FW | Du Zhenyu | 1 | 1 |
| 26 | (China) | DF | Ai Zhibo | 1 | 1 |
| 27 | (China) | FW | Gao Jian | 1 | 1 |

=== Assists ===
| No. | Flag | Pos | Name | Chinese Super League | Total |
|---|---|---|---|---|---|
| 8 | (China) | FW | Du Zhenyu | 4 | 4 |
| 7 | (China) | MF | Jiang Pengxiang | 2 | 2 |
| 9 | (Honduras) | FW | Elvis Scott | 2 | 2 |
| 24 | (China) | MF | Yan Feng | 2 | 2 |
| 4 | (Honduras) | DF | Samuel Caballero | 1 | 1 |
| 10 | (Azerbaijan) | MF | Branimir Subasic | 1 | 1 |
| 14 | (China) | FW | Cao Tianbao | 1 | 1 |
| 21 | (China) | FW | Liu Weidong | 1 | 1 |
| 23 | (China) | MF | Zhang Xiaofei | 1 | 1 |
| 25 | (China) | MF | Lü Jianjun | 1 | 1 |
| 30 | (China) | FW | Liu Xiaodong | 1 | 1 |
| 46 | (Uzbekistan) | MF | Sadriddin Abdullaev | 1 | 1 |

=== Yellow cards ===
| No. | Flag | Pos | Name | Chinese Super League | Total |
|---|---|---|---|---|---|
| 24 | (China) | MF | Yan Feng | 7 | (yellow card) 7 |
| 3 | (China) | DF | Tang Jing | 5 | (yellow card) 5 |
| 2 | (China) | DF | Wang Wanpeng | 4 | (yellow card) 4 |
| 12 | (Nigeria) | DF | Gabriel Melkam | 4 | (yellow card) 4 |
| 5 | (Australia) | DF | Matt McKay | 3 | (yellow card) 3 |
| 7 | (China) | MF | Jiang Pengxiang | 3 | (yellow card) 3 |
| 10 | (Azerbaijan) | MF | Branimir Subasic | 3 | (yellow card) 3 |
| 14 | (China) | FW | Cao Tianbao | 3 | (yellow card) 3 |
| 21 | (China) | FW | Liu Weidong | 3 | (yellow card) 3 |
| 30 | (China) | FW | Liu Xiaodong | 3 | (yellow card) 3 |
| 1 | (China) | GK | Zong Lei | 2 | (yellow card) 2 |
| 11 | (China) | FW | Zhang Wenzhao | 2 | (yellow card) 2 |
| 23 | (China) | MF | Zhang Xiaofei | 2 | (yellow card) 2 |
| 27 | (China) | FW | Gao Jian | 2 | (yellow card) 2 |
| 4 | (Honduras) | DF | Samuel Caballero | 1 | (yellow card) 1 |
| 6 | (China) | MF | Wang Dong | 1 | (yellow card) 1 |
| 8 | (China) | FW | Du Zhenyu | 1 | (yellow card) 1 |
| 9 | (Honduras) | FW | Elvis Scott | 1 | (yellow card) 1 |
| 13 | (China) | DF | Liu Cheng | 1 | (yellow card) 1 |
| 18 | (China) | GK | An Qi | 1 | (yellow card) 1 |
| 29 | (China) | MF | Zhang Tianhan | 1 | (yellow card) 1 |
| 45 | (Colombia) | FW | Ricardo Steer | 1 | (yellow card) 1 |
| 46 | (Uzbekistan) | MF | Sadriddin Abdullaev | 1 | (yellow card) 1 |

=== Red cards ===
| No. | Flag | Pos | Name | Chinese Super League | Total |

=== Captains ===
| # | No. | Pos. | Name | Starts | Rounds |
|---|---|---|---|---|---|
| 1st | 4 | DF | (Honduras) Samuel Caballero | 16 | 1,4–7,9–12,16–19,22–24 |
| 2nd | 6 | MF | (China) Wang Dong | 0 | |
| 3rd | 8 | MF | (China) Du Zhenyu | 3 | 2–3,8 |
| 4th | 3 | DF | (China) Tang Jing | 2 | 13–14 |
| 5th | 1 | GK | (China) Zong Lei | 1 | 15 |
| 6th | 1 | MF | (China) Yan Feng | 2 | 20–21 |

=== Penalties awarded ===
| Date | Success? | Penalty Taker | Opponent | Competition |
|---|---|---|---|---|
| 2009-09-15 | ✓ | (China) Cao Tianbao | Beijing Guoan | Chinese Super League |

=== Suspensions served ===
| Date | Matches Missed | Suspended Player | Reason | Missed Opponents |
|---|---|---|---|---|
| 2009-07-02 | 1 Game | (China) Yan Feng | 4 (yellow card) | Hangzhou Greentown |
| 2009-08-08 | 1 Game | (China) Wang Wanpeng | 4 (yellow card) | Jiangsu Sainty |
| 2009-08-26 | 3 Game | (China) Li Shubin | Unsporting Behavior | Shandong Luneng; Shaanxi Chan–Ba; Shanghai Shenhua |
| 2009-09-05 | 1 Game | (China) Tang Jing | 4 (yellow card) | Shanghai Shenhua |
| 2009-09-12 | 3 Game | (China) Liu Cheng | Unsporting Behavior | Shenzhen A.T. Beijing Guoan; Qingdao Jonoon |
| 2009-09-27 | 1 Game | (Nigeria) Gabriel Melkam | 4 (yellow card) | Tianjin Teda |

=== Overall ===
| Games played | 24 (24 Chinese Super League) |
| Games won | 10 (10 Chinese Super League) |
| Games drawn | 7 (7 Chinese Super League) |
| Games lost | 7 (7 Chinese Super League) |
| Goals scored | 28 (28 Chinese Super League) |
| Goals conceded | 26 (26 Chinese Super League) |
| Goal difference | 2 (2 Chinese Super League) |
| Yellow cards | 55 (55 Chinese Super League) |
| Red cards | 0 (0 Chinese Super League) |
| Worst discipline | (China) Yan Feng (7 (yellow card) , 0 (red card) ) |
| Best result | 3–1 (H) v Shenzhen Asia Travel – Chinese Super League – 2009.5.3; 2–0 (H) v Chengdu Blades – Chinese Super League – 2009.4.5; 2–0 (H) v Guangzhou GPC – Chinese Super League – 2009.6.20; 2–0 (H) v Hangzhou Greentown – Chinese Super League – 2009.7.2 |
| Worst result | 2–6 (H) v Beijing Guoan – Chinese Super League – 2009.5.10 |
| Most appearances | (China) Zong Lei (China) Cao Tianbao (23 appearances) |
| Top scorer | Cao Tianbao (7 Goals) |
| Points | 37 / 72 (51.39%) |

== Transfers ==
=== Transfers in ===
| Player | From | Date | Fee |
|---|---|---|---|
| (China) Ai Zhibo | Wuhan Guanggu | 28 February 2009 | Undisclosed |
| (China) Zhang Wenzhao | Shenzhen | 20 February 2009 | Undisclosed |
| (China) Su Yang | Beijing Hongdeng | 20 February 2009 | Undisclosed |
| (China) Shen Bo | Yantai Yiteng | 20 February 2009 | Undisclosed |
| (China) Wang Huaqiang | Liaoning | 20 February 2009 | Undisclosed |
| (Honduras) Elvis Scott | Beijing Guoan | 18 March 2009 | Undisclosed |
| (Azerbaijan) Branimir Subasic | Red Star | 18 March 2009 | Undisclosed |

=== Transfers out ===
| Player | To | Date | Fee |
|---|---|---|---|
| (China) Wang Bo | Henan Construction | 20 March 2009 | Undisclosed |
| (China) Cui Wei | Guangzhou | 20 March 2009 | Undisclosed |
| (Ivory Coast) Guillaume Dah Zadi | Released | | Free |
| (Honduras) Elvis Scott | Released | | Free |

=== Loans in ===
| Player | From | Date From | Date Till |
|---|---|---|---|
| (Australia) Matt McKay | Queensland Roar | 16 March 2009 | for 4 Months |
| (Colombia) Ricardo Steer | Brujas F.C. | 24 July 2009 | till end of season |
| (Uzbekistan) Sadriddin Abdullaev | Pakhtakor Tashkent | 24 July 2009 | till end of season |
| (China) Yao Bo | Hubei Greenery | 24 July 2009 | Undisclosed |

=== Loans out ===
| Player | To | Date From | Date Till |
|---|---|---|---|
| (China) Wang Rui | Shenyang Dongjin | 24 July 2009 | till end of season |
| (China) Han Dongri | Shenyang Dongjin | 24 July 2009 | till end of season |
