= 2012 Changchun Yatai F.C. season =

Changchun Yatai F.C.
- Chairman: Liu Yuming
- Manager: Svetozar Šapurić
- Super League: 6th
- FA Cup: Quarter-final
- Top goalscorer: League: Wang Dong(6 goals); All: Wang Dong(6 goals)
- Highest home attendance: 21,365 vs. Guangzhou Evergrande (18 August 2012)
- Lowest home attendance: 10,120 vs. Hangzhou Greentown (27 October 2012)
Home colours	Away colours

The 2012 Changchun Yatai F.C. season is Changchun's 7th consecutive season in the Chinese Super League. Changchun will also be competing in the Chinese FA Cup.

== Players ==
=== First team squad ===
Note: Flags indicate national team as defined under FIFA eligibility rules; some limited exceptions apply. Players may hold more than one non-FIFA nationality.

No.	Pos.	Nation	Player
1	GK	CHN	Zong Lei
2	DF	CHN	Wang Wanpeng
4	DF	UZB	Anzur Ismailov
5	DF	BRA	Cássio
6	MF	CHN	Wang Dong (captain)
7	MF	CHN	Jiang Pengxiang
8	MF	CHN	Du Zhenyu
9	FW	BRA	Weldon
10	MF	SRB	Marko Ljubinković
11	FW	CHN	Zhang Wenzhao
12	DF	CHN	Lü Jianjun
13	GK	CHN	Yi Fan
14	FW	CHN	Cao Tianbao
15	DF	CHN	Sun Jie
16	DF	CHN	Jiang Zhe
17	FW	CHN	Cheng Changcheng

No.	Pos.	Nation	Player
18	MF	CHN	Li Mou
19	FW	CHN	Liu Xiaodong
20	MF	CHN	Piao Qianhua
21	FW	CHN	Liu Weidong
22	MF	CHN	Li Shang
23	MF	CHN	Zhang Xiaofei
24	MF	CHN	Chen Liansheng
25	MF	CHN	Che Kai
26	FW	CHN	Pan Chaoran
28	GK	CHN	Mi Tianhe
30	MF	CHN	Qu Xiaohui
32	DF	CHN	Li Guang
33	FW	COL	Edixon Perea
36	DF	CHN	Pei Shuai
37	MF	BUL	Marquinhos
40	FW	COL	John Mosquera

=== Reserve squad ===
Note: Flags indicate national team as defined under FIFA eligibility rules; some limited exceptions apply. Players may hold more than one non-FIFA nationality.

No.	Pos.	Nation	Player
41	GK	CHN	Wang Xiang
42	DF	CHN	Li Hong
43	DF	CHN	Mou Yanlong
44	FW	CHN	Zhao Haoxiang

No.	Pos.	Nation	Player
45	MF	CHN	Mou Yiming
46	MF	CHN	Wang Fa
47	MF	CHN	Wang Mingyu
48	MF	CHN	Wang Si

=== On loan ===
Note: Flags indicate national team as defined under FIFA eligibility rules; some limited exceptions apply. Players may hold more than one non-FIFA nationality.

No.	Pos.	Nation	Player
—	FW	COL	Yovanny Arrechea (at Hohhot Dongjin until 31 December 2012)
—	FW	CHN	Yang He (at Chengdu Blades until 31 December 2012)

== Competitions ==
=== Chinese Super League ===
==== League table ====
Pos	Team	Pld	W	D	L	GF	GA	GD	Pts	Qualification or relegation
4	Guizhou Moutai	30	12	9	9	44	33	+11	45	2013 AFC Champions League group stage (Note: Guizhou Moutai qualified for the 2013 AFC Champions League because league champions Guangzhou Evergrande also won the 2012 Chinese FA Cup.)
5	Dalian Aerbin	30	11	11	8	51	46	+5	44 (Note: Dalian 1–2 Changchun; Changchun 1–2 Dalian)	
6	Changchun Yatai	30	12	8	10	37	40	−3	44	
7	Guangzhou R&F	30	13	3	14	47	49	−2	42	
8	Tianjin TEDA	30	10	10	10	29	30	−1	40	

Source: Chinese Super League (in Chinese)
Rules for classification: 1) points; 2) goal difference; 3) number of goals scored; 4) head-to-head goals scored; 5) goal difference; 6) goals scored; 7) disciplinary points (1 point for each yellow card, 3 points for each red card). Head-to-Head: Only used at the end of the season when two or more teams need the head-to-head rules to break a tie.

==== Matches ====
10 March 2012 1	Dalian Shide	1 - 2	Changchun Yatai	Jinzhou Stadium
15:30 CST	Esteves 4'	Report	Ismailov 10', 27'	Attendance: 12,361; Referee: Xu Hang

24 March 2012 3	Liaoning Whowin	3 - 3	Changchun Yatai	Tiexi New District Sports Center
14:30 CST	Trifunović 33', 66'; Yang Xu 61'	Report	Wang Dong 47'; Pei Shuai 55'; Liu Weidong 75'	Attendance: 15,324; Referee: Huang Yejun

1 April 2012 4	Changchun Yatai	1 - 0	Shanghai Shenxin	Development Area Stadium
15:30 CST	Mosquera 82'	Report		Attendance: 10,552; Referee: Zhou Gang

7 April 2012 5	Henan Jianye	2 - 1	Changchun Yatai	Zhengzhou Hanghai Stadium
15:30 CST	Leandro Netto (yellow card) 48' (yellow-red card) 90'; Katongo 60', 85'	Report	Ljubinković 51'	Attendance: 19,176; Referee: Tan Hai

14 April 2012 6	Changchun Yatai	0 - 0	Guizhou Renhe	Development Area Stadium
15:30 CST	Pei Shuai (yellow card) 38' (yellow-red card) 58'	Report		Attendance: 15,853; Referee: Ma Ning

22 April 2012 7	Guangzhou Evergrande	4 - 0	Changchun Yatai	Tianhe Stadium
19:35 CST	Cléo 28'; Conca 50', 67'; Muriqui 81'	Report		Attendance: 38,214; Referee: Zhang Zhengping

28 April 2012 8	Dalian Aerbin	1 - 2	Changchun Yatai	Jinzhou Stadium
15:00 CST	Utaka 49'	Report	Weldon 2', 19'	Attendance: 8,198; Referee: Wang Jin

5 May 2012 9	Changchun Yatai	0 - 0	Qingdao Jonoon	Development Area Stadium
15:30 CST		Report		Attendance: 10,318; Referee: Tao Rancheng

12 May 2012 10	Jiangsu Sainty	1 - 2	Changchun Yatai	Nanjing Olympic Sports Center
19:40 CST	Eleílson 67'	Report	Weldon 44'; Cao Tianbao 58'	Attendance: 28,985; Referee: Zhou Gang

20 May 2012 11	Changchun Yatai	0 - 1	Beijing Guoan	Development Area Stadium
16:00 CST		Report	Piao Cheng 22'	Attendance: 21,235; Referee: Wang Di

27 May 2012 12	Guangzhou R&F	5 - 1	Changchun Yatai	Yuexiushan Stadium
17:30 CST	Rafael 3', 28', 68'; Davi 44', 90'	Report	Li Zhe 29' (o.g.); Lü Jianjun (red card) 78'	Attendance: 5,812; Referee: Guo Baolong

12 June 2012 2	Changchun Yatai	1 - 0	Shandong Luneng	Development Area Stadium
19:30 CST	Weldon 55'	Report		Attendance: 10,703; Referee: Tao Rancheng

16 June 2012 13	Changchun Yatai	2 - 0	Shanghai Shenhua	Development Area Stadium
19:35 CST	Weldon 9'; Zhang Wenzhao 83'	Report		Attendance: 11,268; Referee: Wang Jin

23 June 2012 14	Hangzhou Greentown	2 - 3	Changchun Yatai	Yellow Dragon Stadium
19:35 CST	Fabrício 22'; Du Wei 38'	Report	Liu Weidong 52'; Wang Dong 81' (pen.); Chen Liansheng 89'	Attendance: 6,783; Referee: Guo Baolong

1 July 2012 15	Changchun Yatai	1 - 1	Tianjin Teda	Development Area Stadium
19:35 CST	Cao Tianbao 47'	Report	Goian 58'	Attendance: 11,231; Referee: Tao Rancheng

9 July 2012 16	Changchun Yatai	0 - 1	Dalian Shide	Development Area Stadium
19:35 CST		Report	Chamanga 11' (pen.)	Attendance: 16,316; Referee: Xu Hang

14 July 2012 17	Shandong Luneng Taishan	3 - 0	Changchun Yatai	Shandong Provincial Stadium
19:30 CST	Gilberto Macena 21', 59'; Wang Yongpo 90'	Report		Attendance: 22,360; Referee: Wang Zhe

22 July 2012 18	Changchun Yatai	2 - 1	Liaoning Whowin	Development Area Stadium
19:35 CST	Wang Dong 71'; Liu Weidong 85'	Report	Yu Hanchao 64'	Attendance: 10,163; Referee: Zhong Jun

4 August 2012 20	Changchun Yatai	2 - 2	Henan Jianye	Development Area Stadium
19:35 CST	Marquinhos 10'; Zhang Wenzhao 21'	Report	Chansa 33'; Xu Yang 64'	Attendance: 10,985; Referee: Fan Qi

10 August 2012 21	Guizhou Renhe	0 - 0	Changchun Yatai	Guiyang Olympic Sports Center
19:30 CST		Report		Attendance: 20,114; Referee: Xu Hang

18 August 2012 22	Changchun Yatai	1 - 2	Guangzhou Evergrande	Development Area Stadium
19:35 CST	Zhang Wenzhao 89'	Report	Conca 49'; Cléo 71'	Attendance: 21,365; Referee: Tan Hai

25 August 2012 23	Changchun Yatai	1 - 2	Dalian Aerbin	Development Area Stadium
19:35 CST	Wang Dong 23' (pen.)	Report	Utaka 2', 87'	Attendance: 10,125; Referee: Guo Baolong

1 September 2012 19	Shanghai Shenxin	2 - 2	Changchun Yatai	Jinshan Sports Centre
19:45 CST	Johnny 26'; Anselmo 90+2'	Report	Zhang Wenzhao 18'; Perea 39'	Attendance: 13,775; Referee: Guo Baolong

24 September 2012 25	Changchun Yatai	0 - 0	Jiangsu Sainty	Development Area Stadium
19:35 CST		Summary		Attendance: 10,157; Referee: Wang Di

29 September 2012 26	Beijing Guoan	0 - 4	Changchun Yatai	Workers Stadium
19:30 CST		Summary	Cao Tianbao 18'; Weldon 75'; Wang Dong 83'; Perea 88'	Attendance: 31,356; Referee: Guo Baolong

3 October 2012 24	Qingdao Jonoon	1 - 0	Changchun Yatai	Qingdao Tiantai Stadium
19:35 CST	Yao Jiangshan 55'	Summary		Attendance: 10,197; Referee: Tan Hai

7 October 2012 27	Changchun Yatai	2 - 1	Guangzhou R&F	Development Area Stadium
15:30 CST	Wang Dong 28'; Liu Weidong 69'	Summary	Zhang Yuan 35'	Attendance: 10,125; Referee: Ma Ning

20 October 2012 28	Shanghai Shenhua	1 - 3	Changchun Yatai	Hongkou Football Stadium
19:45 CST	Griffiths 45'	Summary	Liu Weidong 7'; Liu Xiaodong 9'; Marquinhos 45+2' (pen.)	Attendance: 9,533; Referee: Xu Hang

27 October 2012 29	Changchun Yatai	0 - 3	Hangzhou Greentown	Development Area Stadium
15:30 CST		Summary	Cao Xuan 17'; Renatinho 75'; Wang Song 78'	Attendance: 10,120; Referee: Wang Zhe

3 November 2012 30	Tianjin Teda	0 - 1	Changchun Yatai	TEDA Football Stadium
15:30 CST		Summary	Marquinhos 7'	Attendance: 6,485; Referee: Tan Hai

=== Chinese FA Cup ===
27 June 2012 3rd round	Changchun Yatai	2 - 0	Hohhot Dongjin	Changchun
19:30 CST	Ljubinković 40', 80' (pen.)	Report		Stadium: Development Area Stadium

18 July 2012 4th round	Changchun Yatai	0 - 0 (5 - 3 p)	Shanghai Shenhua	Changchun
19:30 CST		Report		Stadium: Development Area Stadium

1 August 2012 Quarter Final	Shandong Luneng Taishan	1 - 0	Changchun Yatai	Jinan
19:30 CST	Wang Yongpo 79' (pen.)			Stadium: Shandong Provincial Stadium; Attendance: 8,297; Referee: Fan Qi
