= Liu Zhao =

Liu Zhao may refer to:

- Emperor He of Han (79–105), emperor of the Chinese Han Dynasty
- Liu Zhao (historian), Liang dynasty historian who compiled annotations to the Book of the Later Han.
- Liu Zhao (footballer) (born 1985), Chinese footballer
