= Zhang Xiaofei =

Zhang Xiaofei may refer to:

- Zhang Xiaofei (footballer) (张笑非; born 1982), Chinese footballer
- Zhang Xiaofei (actress) (张小斐; born 1986), Chinese actress
