= An Qi =

Chinese footballer (born 1981)

An Qi 安琦
Personal information
- Date of birth: June 21, 1981 (age 45)
- Place of birth: Dalian, Liaoning, China
- Height: 1.91 m (6 ft 3 in)
- Position: Goalkeeper

Youth career
- 1997–1998: Dalian Yiteng

Senior career*
Years	Team	Apps	(Gls)
1999–2000	Guangzhou Matsunichi	2	(0)
2000–2004	Dalian Shide	68	(0)
2004–2005	Dalian Changbo	15	(2)
2006–2007	Xiamen Blue Lions	43	(0)
2008–2010	Changchun Yatai	1	(0)
Total		129	(2)

International career^{‡}
2001	China U20	4	(0)
2001–2004	China	9	(0)

Managerial career
- 2019–?: Dalian Chanjoy Youth (goalkeeping)
- 2022–2023: Shijiazhuang Gongfu (goalkeeping)
- 2025: Guangxi Pingguo (goalkeeping)
Medal record
Representing China
Men's football
AFC Youth Championship
Bronze medal – third place	2000 َ Iran	Team
- * Club domestic league appearances and goals as of 6 March 2013 ‡ National team caps and goals as of 6 March 2013

An Qi (Chinese: 安琦; pinyin: Ān Qí) (born 21 June 1981) is a Chinese former international association football goalkeeper. He represented Guangzhou Matsunichi, Dalian Shide, Dalian Changbo, Xiamen Blue Lions and Changchun Yatai while internationally he participated for the Chinese national team that took part in the 2002 FIFA World Cup, however he did not feature in any of the games.

== Club career ==
An Qi originally started his senior career with Guangzhou Matsunichi before he was called up to the Chinese U20 team that took part in the 2001 FIFA World Youth Championship. After the tournament he was considered one of the most promising young goalkeepers within China and had already drawn the interests of reigning Chinese league champions Dalian Shide where he established himself as their first-choice goalkeeper within the 2002 league season, in time to also be called up to the Chinese football team for the 2002 FIFA World Cup. After several seasons with Dalian Shide, An Qi's position would come into question when on April 9, 2003, the club lost 4–2 to Al Ain FC in a 2002–03 AFC Champions League semi-final match, which saw An Qi have a personally disappointing game. Throughout the rest of the campaign he would have to fight for his position against Song Zhenyu until the club brought in Vladimir Petrović as their new manager who decided to drop An Qi from the squad.

An Qi went on loan to second-tier side Dalian Changbo to help revive his career at the beginning of the 2005 league season, however he had a disastrous competitive debut when his club lost 9–0 to Changchun Yatai on March 5, 2005, in the team's opening league game of the campaign. Despite his disappointing start with his new club An Qi kept his place within the team and started to showcase his penalty scoring abilities when he was designated the spot-kick taker in a league game against Shanghai The 9 on June 11 in a 1–1 draw. After another spot-kick goal against Changchun Yatai on July 2 in a 2–1 defeat, An Qi was able to play at the highest level of Chinese football once again when top-tier side Xiamen Blue Lions decided to sign him and make him their first choice goalkeeper at the beginning of the 2006 season. After two seasons with the team the club would be relegated from the Chinese Super League and decide to disband in a disappointing 2007 league season. Without a club, An Qi moved to reigning league champions Changchun Yatai where he played understudy to Zong Lei; however, before he could challenge for the goalkeeper position he suffered a knee ligament break. He went to Belgium to receive surgery, causing him to miss the entire 2008 league season. An Qi made his debut for Changchun Yatai in a league game against Shenzhen Asia Travel on 12 September 2009 in a 4–0 defeat.

== International career ==
An Qi was called up to the Chinese U20 team that played in the 2001 FIFA World Youth Championship as the starting goalkeeper for the team, which finished in the last 16. After the tournament the Chinese manager Bora Milutinović decided to hand An Qi his senior debut in a friendly against Trinidad and Tobago on August 5, 2001, where he came on as a substitute for Jiang Jin in a 3–0 victory. After the friendly Bora Milutinović gave An Qi his competitive debut against Uzbekistan in a 2002 FIFA World Cup qualification game on September 15, 2001, that China won 2–0. After several further appearances Bora Milutinović decided to include him in the Chinese national squad that played during the 2002 FIFA World Cup.

== Personal life ==
On August 14, 2005, An Qi was arrested in suspicion of rape after a night out drinking with his teammates. A woman accused him of rape at his hotel after the police responded to an alarm. After several hours of questioning the police released An Qi after there was a lack of evidence.

== Honours ==
Dalian Shide

- Chinese Jia-A League: 2000, 2001, 2002
- Chinese FA Cup: 2001
