= Mi Tianhe =

Chinese footballer

Mi Tianhe 米田贺
Personal information
- Date of birth: January 5, 1983 (age 43)
- Place of birth: Jilin, China
- Height: 1.86 m (6 ft 1 in)
- Position: Goalkeeper

Senior career*
Years	Team	Apps	(Gls)
2003–2016	Changchun Yatai	59	(0)
2016	→ Baoding Yingli Yitong (loan)	3	(0)
2017–2018	Baoding Yingli Yitong	24	(0)
- * Club domestic league appearances and goals as of 13 October 2018

Mi Tianhe (simplified Chinese: 米田贺; traditional Chinese: 米田賀; pinyin: Mǐ Tiánhè) (born January 5, 1983) is a Chinese football player.

== Club career ==
Mi Tianhe started his football career in 1997, playing for the various Changchun Yatai youth teams. Eventually graduating from the youth and reserve teams he would break into the first team squad during the 2003 league season. While he saw Changchun win promoted to the top tier at the end of the 2005 league season the club would decide to bring in Zong Lei at the beginning of the 2006 league season. Mi Tianhe would predominantly sit on the bench while Changchun grew from strength to strength and even go on to win the 2007 Chinese Super League title. Playing as a second choice goalkeeper for several seasons Mi Tianhe finally experience regular first team selection when Zong Lei was injured during much of the 2008 league season where he was given a run of seven games. However, despite his talents as a goalkeeper his performances were unable to establish him as a first choice goalkeeper for Changchun and Zong Lei would regain his position within the team. He was released by Changchun at the end of 2014 season.

In March 2016, Mi was loaned to China League Two side Baoding Yingli Yitong until 31 December 2016. He made a permanent transfer to Baoding Yingli Yitong in February 2017.

== Honours ==
- Chinese Super League: 2007
- Chinese Jia B League: 2003
