= Léiner Gómez =

Colombian footballer (born 1982)

Personal information
- Full name: Léiner Gómez Viáfara
- Date of birth: 17 November 1982 (age 43)
- Place of birth: Colombia
- Position: Striker

Senior career*
Years	Team	Apps	(Gls)
2004-2005	Boyaca Chico		
2005	Atlético Huila		
2006	C.D. Italmaracaibo		
2006	L.D.U. Loja		
2007	Deportivo Pereira		
2008	La Equidad		
2008-2009	Deportivo Pasto		(1)
2009	Jiangsu Sainty F.C.	7	(1)
2009	S.D. Aucas		
2010	C.D. Malacateco		
2011	Arabe Unido	4	(1)
2012	Uniautónoma F.C.	11	(1)
2013	Jaguares de Córdoba	13	(2)
- * Club domestic league appearances and goals

Leiner Gomez (Chinese: 戈麦斯; born 17 November 1982) is a Colombian former footballer.

== China ==
Landing in China on 17 March 2009, Gomez was unable to feature as Jiangsu Sainty took on Shanghai Shenhua on 22 March 2009 due to not getting his transfer certificate on time. He then opened his Chinese Super League scoring account to hold Beijing Guoan 1-1, starting despite an insipid performance on debut a week earlier. However, manager Zhang Yudao described his showing during those two games as mediocre, with the Colombian's agent apologizing that he did not meet expectations as well. Ultimately, he stopped training with Jiangsu and separated with them that June.
