= Yin Xiaolong =

Chinese footballer

Yin Xiaolong 尹小龙
Personal information
- Date of birth: October 21, 1985 (age 41)
- Place of birth: Dalian, Liaoning, China
- Height: 1.80 m (5 ft 11 in)
- Positions: Midfielder; striker

Senior career*
Years	Team	Apps	(Gls)
2004–2010	Shenzhen Ruby	72	(4)
2011–2014	Shijiazhuang Yongchang	55	(6)
- * Club domestic league appearances and goals as of Jan 1, 2014

Yin Xiaolong (Chinese: 尹小龙) (October 21, 1985 in Dalian) is a Chinese retired football player who played as a midfielder.

== Club career ==
Yin Xiaolong broke into the Shenzhen Ruby team during the 2004 Chinese Super League season and would make his league debut on September 15, 2004 against Inter Shanghai in a 1–0 victory. As a young striker his pace was quickly utilized by the team's Head coach Zhu Guanghu in the club's successful title campaign and despite only playing a small part in the team's league campaign he received significant plaudits as being the team's next great player after Chinese international Li Yi. While there was much expectancy on him to become a prolific striker the following season the team's Head coach would leave after being offered the Chinese national team position and the new manager Chi Shangbin wouldn't show as much faith with him. This was then followed with the club going through a turbulent period where several managers came in to avoid relegation concerns and it wasn't really until the 2009 Chinese Super League when Yin was permanently moved away from attack and settled in midfield did he start to show his importance to the team and become an integral member of the squad.

== Honours ==
Shenzhen

- Chinese Super League: 2004
