= Du Zhenyu =

Chinese footballer (born 1983)

Du Zhenyu 杜震宇
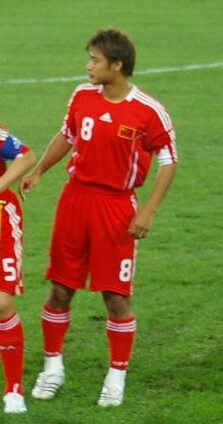

Personal information
- Date of birth: February 10, 1983 (age 43)
- Place of birth: Shenyang, Liaoning, China
- Height: 1.75 m (5 ft 9 in)
- Position: Left winger

Team information
- Current team: Changchun Yatai (technical director)

Senior career*
Years	Team	Apps	(Gls)
2001–2012	Changchun Yatai	229	(76)
2012	→ Tianjin TEDA (loan)	12	(2)
2013–2014	Tianjin TEDA	43	(4)
2015–2018	Changchun Yatai	75	(7)
Total		359	(89)

International career
2006–2009	China	24	(2)

Managerial career
- 2023: China U20 (assistant)
- 2023–2024: Guangxi Pingguo Haliao (assistant)
Medal record
Representing China
Men's football
EAFF Championship
Bronze medal – third place	2008 China	Team
East Asian Games
Gold medal – first place	2001 Macau	Football
- * Club domestic league appearances and goals

Du Zhenyu (Chinese: 杜震宇; pinyin: Dù Zhènyǔ; born February 10, 1983, in Shenyang) was a Chinese retired international footballer.

== Club career ==
Du Zhenyu started his career in 2001 with Changchun Yatai, where in his first season he made eighteen appearances, scoring five goals. He gradually became a team regular for Changchun Yatai beginning in 2003. He established himself as a first-team regular in 2005 when he played a significant role in the promotion of Changchun Yatai to the Chinese Super League by helping Changchun place second in the China League. With Changchun now in the top tier, Du Zhenyu found it relatively easy to translate his prolific goalscoring record from midfield by scoring seven league goals to help Changchun place fourth in the league.

The 2007 league season was to prove the most successful for Du Zhenyu, as he played a significant part in the title-winning Changchun Yatai team, subsequently winning the Footballer of the Year award in the process. The following season saw Changchun play in the AFC Champions League; however, despite scoring several goals and a winning start against Bình Dương F.C., Changchun were unable to get out of the group stages. The 2008 league season wasn't to prove much more successful as Changchun ended the season in sixth; however, Du Zhenyu still continued his prolific goalscoring form by scoring ten league goals.

At the beginning of the 2012 Chinese Super League season, Du lost favour within the team to Liu Weidong, which soon saw him decide to move to Tianjin Teda on loan, where he made his debut on July 14, 2012, against Qingdao Jonoon in a league game that ended in a 0–0 draw. After that game, he quickly established himself as a regular within the team and on July 28, 2012, he scored his first goal for the club in a league game against Beijing Guoan in a 2–1 victory. His productive time at Tianjin was, however, halted when he was fined 35,000 yuan and banned for 7 games for pushing and abusing a referee after being sent off for two bookable offences on October 27, 2012, in a league game against Guizhou Renhe. Despite his suspension carrying on to the following season, Tianjin decided to make his move permanent before the start of the 2013 Chinese Super League.

After the 2014 season he was released by Tianjin. At the age of 32, he decided to return to his former club, Changchun Yatai, and signed a two-year deal with the side.

== International career ==
Du would be called up to the Chinese national team for the first time by the team's manager Zhu Guanghu. He would make his debut in a friendly match against Thailand on August 10, 2006, in a 4–0 win where he also scored his first goal.

== Management career ==
On 15 August 2026, Du re-joined Changchun Yatai as technical director.

== International goals ==
=== National team ===
No.	Date	Venue	Opponent	Score	Result	Competition
1.	10 August 2006	Qinhuangdao Olympic Sports Center Stadium, Qinhuangdao, China	Thailand	3–0	4–0	Friendly
2.	21 October 2007	Century Lotus Stadium, Foshan, China	Myanmar	2–0	7–0	2010 FIFA World Cup qualification

=== Changchun Yatai ===
No.	Date	Venue	Opponent	Score	Result	Competition
1.	12 March 2008	Changchun City Stadium, Changchun, China	(Vietnam) Bình Dương F.C.	1–0	2–1	2008 AFC Champions League
2.	23 April 2008	Steelyard Stadium, Pohang, South Korea	(South Korea) Pohang Steelers	1–2	2–2	2008 AFC Champions League
3.	24 March 2010	Changchun City Stadium, Changchun, China	(South Korea) Jeonbuk Hyundai Motors	1–0	1–2	2010 AFC Champions League

== Career statistics ==
Statistics accurate as of match played 11 November 2018.

Club	Season	League			FA Cup		CSL Cup		Asia		Total	
Club	Season	Division	Apps	Goals	Apps	Goals	Apps	Goals	Apps	Goals	Apps	Goals
Changchun Yatai	2001	Jia B League / China League One	18	5	3	0	—		—		21	5
Changchun Yatai	2002	Jia B League / China League One	12	3	0	0	—		—		12	3
Changchun Yatai	2003	Jia B League / China League One	26	10		1	—		—		26	11
Changchun Yatai	2004	Jia B League / China League One	15	10	0	0	—		—		15	10
Changchun Yatai	2005	Jia B League / China League One	21	10	0	0	—		—		21	10
Changchun Yatai	2006	Chinese Super League	26	8	0	0	—		—		26	8
Changchun Yatai	2007	Chinese Super League	22	9	—		—		—		22	9
Changchun Yatai	2008	Chinese Super League	25	10	—		—		5	2	30	12
Changchun Yatai	2009	Chinese Super League	13	1	—		—		—		13	1
Changchun Yatai	2010	Chinese Super League	25	7	—		—		3	1	28	8
Changchun Yatai	2011	Chinese Super League	16	3	2	1	—		—		18	4
Changchun Yatai	2012	Chinese Super League	10	0	0	0	—		—		10	0
Tianjin Teda (loan)	2012	Chinese Super League	12	2	1	0	—		—		13	2
Tianjin Teda	2013	Chinese Super League	15	0	2	0	—		—		17	0
Tianjin Teda	2014	Chinese Super League	28	4	1	0	—		—		29	4
Changchun Yatai	2015	Chinese Super League	26	3	0	0	—		—		26	3
Changchun Yatai	2016	Chinese Super League	22	0	0	0	—		—		22	0
Changchun Yatai	2017	Chinese Super League	21	3	0	0	—		—		21	3
Changchun Yatai	2018	Chinese Super League	6	1	0	0	—		—		6	1
Career total			359	89	9	2	0	0	8	3	376	94

== Honours ==
Changchun Yatai

- Chinese Super League: 2007
- Chinese Jia B League: 2003
