= Zhang Tianhan =

Chinese footballer

Zhang Tianhan 张天晗
Personal information
- Date of birth: October 22, 1987 (age 39)
- Place of birth: Shenyang, Liaoning, China
- Height: 1.84 m (6 ft 0 in)
- Positions: Defender; midfielder

Youth career
- 2002–2006: Qingdao Jonoon

Senior career*
Years	Team	Apps	(Gls)
2006–2007	Qingdao Jonoon	0	(0)
2008–2012	Changchun Yatai	10	(0)
2015–2016	Shenzhen Yisheng		
2016–2017	Zhaoqing Hengtai		
2017–2018	Anhui Hefei Guiguan	10	(4)
2018–2020	Kunshan FC	57	(18)
- * Club domestic league appearances and goals as of 31 December 2020

Zhang Tianhan (simplified Chinese: 张天晗; traditional Chinese: 張天晗; pinyin: Zhāng Tiānhán) (born October 22, 1987) is a Chinese football player.

== Club career ==
Originally starting his professional football career at Qingdao Jonoon Zhang Tianhan would be unable to establish himself with the senior squad. In the 2008 league season, Changchun Yatai were willing to take the young player into their squad, he would then go on to make his debut for the club in a league game against Beijing Guoan F.C. on October 22, 2008, where he came on as a substitute in a 2–1 defeat. By the end of the season he would show signs of development when he made a total of eight league appearances for them in his debut campaign, however this was the height of his career with the club and by the end of the 2011 season he was allowed to leave the club.

Without a club Zhang retired from football at only 24 years old and started a business selling shoes. After three years the company would financially struggle in 2015 and Zhang would look to return to football with amateur teams Shenzhen Yisheng and Zhaoqing Hengtai where he was paid 1000 Yuan per appearance. In the 2017 China Amateur Football League season Zhang would gain promotion to the Chinese third tier with Anhui Hefei Guiguan before joining Kunshan FC who he was able to gain promotion with them to the second tier at the end of the 2019 China League Two season.

== Career statistics ==
As of 31 December 2020.

Appearances and goals by club, season and competition
Club	Season	League			National Cup		Continental		Other		Total	
Club	Season	Division	Apps	Goals	Apps	Goals	Apps	Goals	Apps	Goals	Apps	Goals
Qingdao Jonoon	2006	Chinese Super League	0	0	-		-		-		0	0
Qingdao Jonoon	2007	Chinese Super League	0	0	-		-		-		0	0
Qingdao Jonoon	Total		0	0	0	0	0	0	0	0	0	0
Changchun Yatai	2008	Chinese Super League	8	0	-		0	0	-		8	0
Changchun Yatai	2009	Chinese Super League	2	0	-		-		-		2	0
Changchun Yatai	2010	Chinese Super League	0	0	-		1	0	-		1	0
Changchun Yatai	2011	Chinese Super League	0	0	0	0	-		-		0	0
Changchun Yatai	Total		10	0	0	0	1	0	0	0	11	0
Shenzhen Yisheng	2015	China Amateur Football League	-		-		-		-		-	
Shenzhen Yisheng	2016	China Amateur Football League	-		-		-		-		-	
Shenzhen Yisheng	Total		0	0	0	0	0	0	0	0	0	0
Zhaoqing Hengtai	2016	China Amateur Football League	-		4	0	-		-		4	0
Anhui Hefei Guiguan	2017	China Amateur Football League	-		-		-		-		-	
Anhui Hefei Guiguan	2018	China League Two	10	4	4	1	-		-		14	5
Anhui Hefei Guiguan	Total		10	4	4	1	0	0	0	0	14	5
Kunshan FC	2018	China League Two	10	2	0	0	-		-		10	2
Kunshan FC	2019	China League Two	32	14	0	0	-		-		32	14
Kunshan FC	2020	China League One	15	2	0	0	-		-		15	2
Kunshan FC	Total		57	18	0	0	0	0	0	0	57	18
Career total			77	22	8	1	1	0	0	0	86	23
