= Cao Tianbao =

Chinese football striker (born 1982)

Cao Tianbao 曹添堡
Personal information
- Full name: Cao Tianbao
- Date of birth: 3 April 1982 (age 44)
- Place of birth: Shenyang, Liaoning, China
- Height: 1.85 m (6 ft 1 in)
- Position: Second striker

Team information
- Current team: Shanxi Longchengren (head coach)

Senior career*
Years	Team	Apps	(Gls)
2001–2014	Changchun Yatai	253	(53)
2001	→ Mianyang FC (loan)	8	(1)
2011	→ Shenzhen Phoenix (loan)	25	(4)
2015	Meizhou Hakka	11	(6)
2016	Shenzhen Renren	18	(6)
2017	Chengdu Qbao	19	(4)
2018–2020	Chengdu Better City	28	(5)
2021	Sichuan Minzu	1	(0)

International career^{‡}
2009	China	1	(0)

Managerial career
- 2021: Sichuan Minzu (assistant)
- 2021-2022: Sichuan Minzu (caretaker)
- 2022-2023: Changchun Shenhua
- 2024-: Shanxi Longchengren
- * Club domestic league appearances and goals as of 18 May 2022 ‡ National team caps and goals as of 1 June 2009

Cao Tianbao (Chinese: 曹添堡; pinyin: Cáo Tiānbǎo; Former name Cao Ming, born 3 April 1982 in Shenyang) is a Chinese football manager and former professional footballer who played as a striker.

== Club career ==
Tianbao started his professional football career with Changchun Yatai in 2001 after he graduated from their youth team. He gradually established himself within the Changchun squad as they fought for promotion to the top tier, eventually achieving this in the 2005 league season when they came second in the league.

Playing in the top tier, Cao found it difficult to start many games since the club brought in Elvis Scott and then Guillaume Dah Zadi as their main strikers within the club, nevertheless Cao found his role within the team as a prolific goalscorer coming off the bench and go on to win the league title in the 2007 season with the club.

It was only with the introduction of Li Shubin as the team's new manager did Cao Tianbao actually establish himself as the club's first-choice second striker within the team and help guide the club to a runners-up position at the end of the 2009 Chinese Super League season. When the club brought in Shen Xiangfu as their next manager, Cao found himself dropped from the starting line-up once more; however, this time when used as a substitute he wasn't able to find his goal scoring touch and was allowed to leave for second-tier club Shenzhen Phoenix at the beginning of the 2011 league season. At the club, he was reunited with Li Shubin and was given the number 14 shirt once again. He was released by Changchun at the end of 2014 season.

In July 2015, Cao transferred to China League Two side Meizhou Kejia. In March 2016, Cao transferred to fellow China League Two side Shenzhen Renren.

On 23 February 2017, Cao transferred to Chengdu Qbao. Despite finishing tenth out of twenty-four teams, the club withdrew from the League before the 2018 season when its owner was under investigation for an illegal fund-raising scandal. On 20 March 2018, Chengdu Better City was established on its ashes, and Cao remained in its squad as they played within the fourth tier and immediately gained successive promotions. On 26 March 2021, the contract Cao had with Chengdu would expire, and he joined second-tier football club Sichuan Minzu on a free transfer.

== International career ==
Cao was called up for the first time to the Chinese national team by his former coach Gao Hongbo who gave Cao his international debut in a friendly against Iran in a 1–0 win on 1 June 2009.

== Career statistics ==
As of 31 December 2020.

Appearances and goals by club, season and competition
Club	Season	League			National Cup		Continental		Other		Total	
Club	Season	Division	Apps	Goals	Apps	Goals	Apps	Goals	Apps	Goals	Apps	Goals
Changchun Yatai	2001	Chinese Jia-B League	0	0	0	0	-		-		0	0
Changchun Yatai	2002	Chinese Jia-B League	0	0	0	0	-		-		0	0
Changchun Yatai	2003	Chinese Jia-B League	26	4	0	0	-		-		26	4
Changchun Yatai	2004	China League One	25	8	0	0	-		-		25	8
Changchun Yatai	2005	China League One	23	8	0	0	-		-		23	8
Changchun Yatai	2006	Chinese Super League	23	9	0	0	-		-		23	9
Changchun Yatai	2007	Chinese Super League	18	2	-		-		-		18	2
Changchun Yatai	2008	Chinese Super League	24	9	-		4	0	-		24	9
Changchun Yatai	2009	Chinese Super League	27	7	-		-		-		27	7
Changchun Yatai	2010	Chinese Super League	11	0	-		5	0	-		16	0
Changchun Yatai	2012	Chinese Super League	26	3	2	0	-		-		28	3
Changchun Yatai	2013	Chinese Super League	26	1	1	0	-		-		27	1
Changchun Yatai	2014	Chinese Super League	24	2	0	0	-		-		24	2
Changchun Yatai	Total		253	53	3	0	9	0	0	0	265	53
Mianyang F.C. (loan)	2001	Chinese Jia-B League	8	1	0	0	-		-		8	1
Shenzhen Phoenix (loan)	2011	China League One	25	4	0	0	-		-		25	4
Meizhou Kejia	2015	China League Two	11	6	0	0	-		-		11	6
Shenzhen Renren	2016	China League Two	18	6	1	0	-		-		19	6
Chengdu Qbao	2017	China League Two	19	4	0	0	-		-		19	4
Chengdu Qbao	2018	Chinese Champions League	-		-		-		-		-	-
Chengdu Qbao	2019	China League Two	27	5	1	0	-		-		28	5
Chengdu Qbao	2020	China League One	1	0	0	0	-		-		1	0
Chengdu Qbao	Total		47	9	1	0	0	0	0	0	48	9
Career total			362	79	5	0	9	0	0	0	376	79

== Honours ==
=== Club ===
Changchun Yatai

- Chinese Super League: 2007
- Chinese Jia-B League: 2003

Meizhou Kejia

- China League Two: 2015
