= Yan Feng =

Chinese footballer

Yan Feng 闫峰
Personal information
- Full name: Yan Feng
- Date of birth: February 7, 1982 (age 44)
- Place of birth: Dalian, Liaoning, China
- Height: 1.73 m (5 ft 8 in)
- Position: Defensive midfielder

Team information
- Current team: Changchun Yatai (head coach)

Senior career*
Years	Team	Apps	(Gls)
2003–2005	Sichuan Guancheng	64	(4)
2006–2010	Changchun Yatai	89	(3)
2010–2012	Dalian Shide	32	(1)
2013	Dalian Aerbin	0	(0)
2013–2017	Changchun Yatai	79	(3)
2018–2019	Shaanxi Chang'an Athletic	53	(1)

International career^{‡}
2009–2010	China	3	(0)

Managerial career
- 2020: Shaanxi Chang'an Athletic U23
- 2022–2023: Shaanxi Chang'an Athletic (assistant)
- 2024–2025: Changchun Yatai U21
- 2025: Changchun Yatai (interim)
- 2025: Guangdong GZ-Power (assistant)
- 2026–: Changchun Yatai
Medal record
Representing China
Men's football
EAFF Championship
Gold medal – first place	2010 Japan	Team
- * Club domestic league appearances and goals as of 3 November 2018 ‡ National team caps and goals as of 4 November 2013

Yan Feng (simplified Chinese: 闫峰; traditional Chinese: 閆峰; pinyin: Yàn Fēng; born February 7, 1982, in Dalian, Liaoning) is a Chinese football coach and former international footballer.

== Club career ==
=== Sichuan Guancheng ===
Yan Feng would play for top tier club Sichuan Guancheng in the 2003 Chinese Jia-A League. In the re-branded 2004 Chinese Super League he would make his debut in the new league against Beijing Guoan on May 16, 2004, to in a 1-1 draw. He would gradually established himself as their first choice defensive midfielder within their team until Sichuan Guancheng were disbanded at the end of the 2005 league season and he was free to leave the club.

=== Changchun Yatai ===
Being a young and experienced top tier player Yan Feng would attract the interests of several teams within China, eventually deciding to join the newly promoted Changchun Yatai at the beginning of the 2006 Chinese Super League season. He was the make his league debut in Changchun Yatai's first game of the season against Shanghai Shenhua on March 12 in a 0-0 draw. Throughout the season Changchun Yatai surprised many when they eventually finished the season in 4th. When Gao Hongbo was brought in to manage the squad Changchun Yatai were able to improve upon their previous season by actually winning the Chinese Super League 2007 title, with Yan Feng playing an integral part within the midfield.

== International career ==
Yan Feng was called up into the Chinese senior team on 25 July 2009 to face Kyrgyzstan in a friendly, which China won 3-0. Under the Chinese Head coach Gao Hongbo, Yan Feng would become a squad regular within the team and make a further appearance in another friendly against Kuwait on November 8, 2009, in a game that ended 2-2.

== Career statistics ==
Statistics accurate as of match played 31 December 2019.

Appearances and goals by club, season and competition
Club	Season	League			National Cup		League Cup		Continental		Total	
Club	Season	Division	Apps	Goals	Apps	Goals	Apps	Goals	Apps	Goals	Apps	Goals
Sichuan Guancheng	2003	Chinese Jia-A League	24	2	0	0	-		-		24	2
Sichuan Guancheng	2004	Chinese Super League	21	0	1	1	0	0	-		22	1
Sichuan Guancheng	2005	Chinese Super League	19	2	0	0	0	0	-		19	2
Sichuan Guancheng	Total		64	4	1	1	0	0	0	0	65	5
Changchun Yatai	2006	Chinese Super League	26	0	0	0	-		-		26	0
Changchun Yatai	2007	Chinese Super League	22	0	-		-		-		22	0
Changchun Yatai	2008	Chinese Super League	19	1	-		-		5	1	24	2
Changchun Yatai	2009	Chinese Super League	22	3	-		-		-		22	3
Changchun Yatai	2010	Chinese Super League	5	0	-		-		6	0	11	0
Changchun Yatai	Total		94	4	0	0	0	0	11	1	105	5
Dalian Shide	2010	Chinese Super League	12	1	-		-		-		12	1
Dalian Shide	2011	Chinese Super League	20	0	0	0	-		-		20	0
Dalian Shide	2012	Chinese Super League	25	1	0	0	-		-		25	1
Dalian Shide	Total		57	2	0	0	0	0	0	0	57	2
Dalian Aerbin	2013	Chinese Super League	0	0	0	0	-		-		0	0
Changchun Yatai	2013	Chinese Super League	14	0	0	0	-		-		14	0
Changchun Yatai	2014	Chinese Super League	13	0	0	0	-		-		13	0
Changchun Yatai	2015	Chinese Super League	25	2	1	0	-		-		26	2
Changchun Yatai	2016	Chinese Super League	20	1	0	0	-		-		20	1
Changchun Yatai	2017	Chinese Super League	7	0	0	0	-		-		7	0
Changchun Yatai	Total		79	3	1	0	0	0	0	0	80	3
Shaanxi Chang'an Athletic	2018	China League Two	29	0	1	0	-		-		30	0
Shaanxi Chang'an Athletic	2019	China League One	24	1	0	0	-		-		24	1
Shaanxi Chang'an Athletic	Total		53	1	1	0	0	0	0	0	54	1
Career total			347	14	3	1	0	0	11	1	361	16

== Honours ==
=== Club ===
Changchun Yatai

- Chinese Super League: 2007

=== Country ===
- East Asian Football Championship: 2010
