= Gao Jian =

Chinese footballer

Gao Jian 高健
Personal information
- Date of birth: August 10, 1982 (age 44)
- Place of birth: Shenyang, Liaoning, China
- Height: 1.85 m (6 ft 1 in)
- Position: Striker

Youth career
- 1996–2001: Changchun Yatai

Senior career*
Years	Team	Apps	(Gls)
2001–2011	Changchun Yatai	94	(14)
2008	→Shenzhen Shangqingyin (loan)	14	(3)
2012–2013	Qinghai Senke	21	(7)
- * Club domestic league appearances and goals as of 24 February 2010

Gao Jian (Chinese: 高健; pinyin: Gāo Jiàn) (born August 10, 1982) is a Chinese former association football player.

== Club career ==
Gao started his football career for Changchun Yatai in the 2001 league season after graduating from their youth team. He would eventually establish himself as a regular within the team and would particularly rise to prominence during the 2005 league season when he aided the team to a runners-up position within the division, leading to promotion to the top tier. The following season saw Changchun Yatai thrive in the top tier, however Gao struggled in attack and only scored four goals in 22 appearances. After his disappointing season Changchun Yatai brought in Guillaume Dah Zadi at the beginning of the 2007 league season, leading to Gao's playing time to severely drop and having to watch as the team won the league title. To get some more playing time he was loaned out to Shenzhen Shangqingyin in 2008 season for 300,000 RMB.

== Honours ==
Changchun Yatai

- Chinese Super League: 2007
- Chinese Jia B League: 2003
