= Ricardo Steer =

Colombian footballer (born 1982)

Personal information
- Full name: Eder Ricardo Steer Lara
- Date of birth: 8 June 1982 (age 44)
- Place of birth: Valledupar, Colombia
- Height: 1.83 m (6 ft 0 in)
- Position: Striker

Senior career*
Years	Team	Apps	(Gls)
2005	Independiente Medellín		
2005–2006	Municipal Pérez Zeledón		
2006–2009	Brujas		
2009–2010	Changchun Yatai	37	(10)
2011	Guangdong Sunray Cave	23	(8)
2012–2016	Harbin Yiteng	134	(47)
2017–2018	Jaguares de Córdoba	35	(9)
2018–2019	Once Caldas	19	(2)
- * Club domestic league appearances and goals as of 18 August 2023

Eder Ricardo Steer Lara (Spanish pronunciation: [riˈkaɾðo esˈtiɾ]; born 8 June 1982) is a retired Colombian football player.

== Career ==
He used to play for Independiente Medellín in Colombia and Municipal Pérez Zeledón, Brujas F.C. in Costa Rica. Steer was one of the most successful foreign players to appear for Pérez Zeledón.

On 25 July 2009, he signed an 18-month contract with Changchun Yatai. He played 14 games and scored 7 goals in the 2009 season.
