= Li Fei (footballer) =

Chinese footballer (born 1983)

Li Fei 黎斐
Personal information
- Date of birth: February 17, 1983 (age 43)
- Place of birth: Wuhan, Hubei, China
- Height: 1.74 m (5 ft 9 in)
- Position: Midfielder

Youth career
- 2000–2002: Shenzhen Ping'an Kejian

Senior career*
Years	Team	Apps	(Gls)
2002–2011	Shenzhen Ruby	153	(9)
2012–2013	Chongqing FC	49	(1)
2014–2017	Shenzhen Ruby	108	(8)
- * Club domestic league appearances and goals as of 28 October 2017

Li Fei (Chinese: 黎斐; pinyin: Lí Fěi; February 17, 1983) is a Chinese former professional football player who played as a left-footed midfielder.

== Club career ==
Li Fei was scouted as a 17 years old to join Shenzhen Ruby's youth team before he graduated to their senior team in the 2002 league season. While he was part of the squad that won the 2004 league title it was not until the 2005 league season when the new head coach Chi Shangbin showed faith within Li and started to establish him as a vital member within the team. Li's establishment within the team's midfield came at a time during a transitional period in the club's history when the team sold most of their top players to relieve their financial problems, however Li remained and was one of the few constants within the team. A faithful member of the team Li's loyalties have been tested, first in 2007 when he attracted interest from one of his hometown clubs Wuhan Guanggu and then again in 2009 when he demanded better pay for not only himself but for several other players as well. In response Shenzhen reached a consensus with Li and also made him the team's captain.

On 29 January 2026, Li was given a lifetime ban for match-fixing by the Chinese Football Association.

== Club career stats ==
Statistics accurate as of match played 28 October 2017.

Season	Team	Country	Division	Apps	Goals
2002	Shenzhen Ping'an Insurance	China	1	4	0
2003	Shenzhen Jianlibao	China	1	3	0
2004	Shenzhen Jianlibao	China	1	3	0
2005	Shenzhen Jianlibao	China	1	16	1
2006	Shenzhen Kingway	China	1	16	2
2007	Shenzhen Shangqingyin	China	1	24	3
2008	Shenzhen Shangqingyin	China	1	20	0
2009	Shenzhen Asia Travel F.C.	China	1	26	1
2010	Shenzhen Ruby	China	1	24	2
2011	Shenzhen Ruby	China	1	17	0
2012	Chongqing F.C.	China	2	25	0
2013	Chongqing F.C.	China	2	24	1
2014	Shenzhen Ruby	China	2	27	1
2015	Shenzhen F.C.	China	2	24	0
2016	Shenzhen F.C.	China	2	29	5
2017	Shenzhen F.C.	China	2	28	2

== Honours ==
Shenzhen

- Chinese Super League: 2004
