= Liu Cheng (footballer, born 1985) =

Chinese association football player

Personal information
- Date of birth: 15 October 1985 (age 41)
- Place of birth: Shenyang, Liaoning, China
- Height: 1.84 m (6 ft 0 in)
- Position: Defender

Youth career
- 2002: Changchun Yatai

Senior career*
| Years | Team | Apps | (Gls) |
| 2003–2011 | Changchun Yatai | 49 | (1) |
| 2012–2013 | Qinghai Senke | 24 | (0) |
| 2015 | Changchun Shenhua | | |
| Total | | 73 | (1) |
- * Club domestic league appearances and goals as of 14:01, 6 June 2019 (UTC)

Liu Cheng (simplified Chinese: 刘成; traditional Chinese: 劉成; pinyin: Liú Chéng; born 15 October 1985) is a Chinese former footballer.

== Career statistics ==
=== Club ===
| Club | Season | League | | | Cup | | Continental | | Other | | Total | |
| Club | Season | Division | Apps | Goals | Apps | Goals | Apps | Goals | Apps | Goals | Apps | Goals |
|---|---|---|---|---|---|---|---|---|---|---|---|---|
| Changchun Yatai | 2003 | Chinese Jia-B League | 0 | 0 | 0 | 0 | – | | 0 | 0 | 0 | 0 |
| Changchun Yatai | 2004 | China League One | 8 | 0 | 0 | 0 | – | | 0 | 0 | 8 | 0 |
| Changchun Yatai | 2005 | China League One | 2 | 0 | 0 | 0 | – | | 0 | 0 | 2 | 0 |
| Changchun Yatai | 2006 | Chinese Super League | 0 | 0 | 0 | 0 | – | | 0 | 0 | 0 | 0 |
| Changchun Yatai | 2007 | Chinese Super League | 6 | 0 | 0 | 0 | – | | 0 | 0 | 6 | 0 |
| Changchun Yatai | 2008 | Chinese Super League | 2 | 0 | 0 | 0 | 0 | 0 | 0 | 0 | 2 | 0 |
| Changchun Yatai | 2009 | Chinese Super League | 12 | 0 | 0 | 0 | – | | 0 | 0 | 12 | 0 |
| Changchun Yatai | 2010 | Chinese Super League | 19 | 1 | 0 | 0 | 0 | 0 | 0 | 0 | 19 | 1 |
| Changchun Yatai | 2011 | Chinese Super League | 0 | 0 | 0 | 0 | – | | 0 | 0 | 0 | 0 |
| Changchun Yatai | Total | | 49 | 1 | 0 | 0 | 0 | 0 | 0 | 0 | 49 | 1 |
| Qinghai Senke | 2012 | China League Two | 24 | 0 | 0 | 0 | – | | 0 | 0 | 24 | 0 |
| Qinghai Senke | 2013 | China League Two | – | | 1 (Note: Appearances in the Chinese FA Cup) | 1 | – | | 0 | 0 | 1 | 1 |
| Qinghai Senke | Total | | 24 | 0 | 1 | 1 | 0 | 0 | 0 | 0 | 25 | 1 |
| Career total | | | 73 | 1 | 1 | 1 | 0 | 0 | 0 | 0 | 74 | 2 |
