= Sadriddin Abdullaev =

Uzbekistani professional soccer player

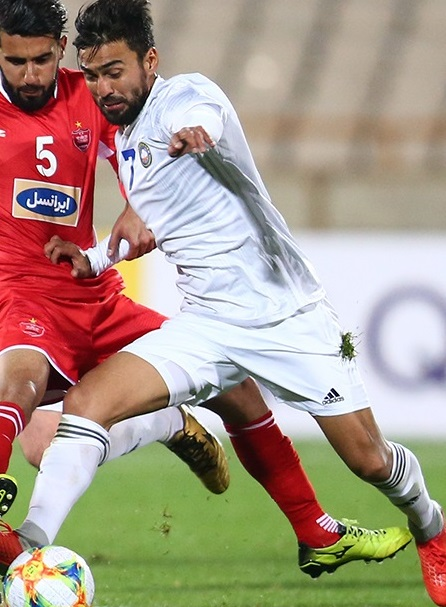
- Abdullaev plays for Pakhtakor Tashkent in 2019

Personal information
- Full name: Sadriddin Abdullaev
- Date of birth: 11 June 1986 (age 40)
- Place of birth: Tashkent, Uzbek SSR, Soviet Union
- Height: 1.77 m (5 ft 9 1/2 in)
- Position: Midfielder

Senior career*
Years	Team	Apps	(Gls)
2005–2010	Pakhtakor Tashkent		
2009	→ Changchun Yatai (loan)	9	(2)
2010	Lokomotiv Tashkent	12	(2)
2011	Shurtan	9	(0)
2012–2014	Lokomotiv Tashkent	52	(7)
2015	T-Team		
2016–2018	Lokomotiv Tashkent	53	(3)
2019–2020	Pakhtakor Tashkent	15	(0)
2021	Lokomotiv Tashkent	17	(0)

International career
2008	Uzbekistan	1	(0)
- * Club domestic league appearances and goals as of 15:08, 21 November 2021 (UTC)

Sadriddin Abdullaev (born 11 June 1986) is an Uzbekistani professional footballer who plays as a midfielder.

== Club career ==
Abdullaev started his footballing career at Pakhtakor Tashkent. On 25 July 2009, he moved on loan to Changchun Yatai. He played 9 games and scored 2 goals in Season 2009. After the contract with Changchun expired, he returned to Uzbekistan and joined Lokomotiv Tashkent in 2010. At the end of November 2014 he signed a contract with T-Team, club playing in Malaysian Premier League. On 2016, he returned to Lokomotiv Tashkent.

== International career ==
Abdullaev made his debut for Uzbekistan in a 2010 FIFA World Cup qualification match against Saudi Arabia in a 0–4 defeat on 22 June 2008.

== Honours ==
=== Club ===
Pakhtakor

- Uzbek League: 2005, 2006, 2007
- Uzbek League runner-up: 2008
- Uzbek Cup: 2005, 2006, 2007
- CIS Cup: 2007

Lokomotiv

- Uzbek League runner-up: 2013, 2014
- Uzbek Cup: 2014
