= Elvis Scott =

Honduran footballer (born 1978)

Personal information
- Full name: Elvis Geovany Scott Ruiz
- Date of birth: 1 August 1978 (age 48)
- Place of birth: Puerto Cortés, Honduras
- Height: 1.82 m (5 ft 11 1/2 in)
- Position: Striker

Senior career*
Years	Team	Apps	(Gls)
1996–2001	Platense	62	(21)
2001–2002	Olimpia		
2002	Marathón	37	(13)
2003	Alianza		
2003–2004	Olimpia		
2004–2005	Universidad		
2005–2006	Motagua		(2)
2006–2009	Changchun Yatai	65	(21)
2008	→ Beijing Guoan (loan)	19	(4)
2009	Marathón	3	(1)
2010	Platense		(2)
2010	Necaxa		
2011	Platense		
2012	Juventud Retalteca	16	(2)

International career^{‡}
2000–2006	Honduras	2	(1)
- * Club domestic league appearances and goals as of 31 July 2009 ‡ National team caps and goals as of 19 May 2013

Elvis Geovany Scott Ruiz (Spanish pronunciation: [ˈelβis esˈkot]; born 1 August 1978) is a Honduran former football striker. He last played for the Juventud Retalteca football club from Guatemala.

== Club career ==
Scott began his career at his hometown club Platense before playing for several teams in the Honduran National League. He spent the 2003 Clausura season in El Salvador with Alianza. In December 2005, he was signed by Chinese club Changchun Yatai, along with his teammate Víctor Mena and Olimpia player Samuel Caballero. He returned to Honduras in the summer of 2009 and was signed by Marathón just in time for the 2009 Apertura.

He joined Necaxa from Platense for the 2010 Apertura season but claiming the club owed him money he left them and he returned to Platense in August 2011, but he moved abroad again to play for Guatemalan side Juventud Retalteca in January 2012. In June 2012 he returned to Platense to seal another contract with the club.

=== Club career stats ===
Last update: 31 July 2009

Season	Team	Country	Division	Apps	Goals
98/99	Platense	Honduras	1	12	3
99/00	Platense	Honduras	1	34	12
00/01	Platense	Honduras	1	16	6
01/02	Marathón	Honduras	1	?	13
02/03	Olimpia	Honduras	1	?	?
2003	Alianza	El Salvador	1	?	?
03/04	Olimpia	Honduras	1	?	?
04/05	Olimpia	Honduras	1	?	?
05/06	Motagua	Honduras	1	?	?
2006	Changchun Yatai	China	1	23	6
2007	Changchun Yatai	China	1	23	12
2008	Changchun Yatai	China	1	4	0
2008	Beijing Guoan	China	1	18	4
2009	Changchun Yatai	China	1	15	3
2009	Marathón	Honduras	1	3	1

== International career ==
He was a member of Honduras' squad at the 2000 Summer Olympics in Sydney.

Scott made his senior debut for Honduras in an August 2000 friendly match against Haiti and has earned a total of 2 caps, scoring 1 goal. His second and final international was a February 2006 friendly match against China.

=== International goals ===
N.	Date	Venue	Opponent	Score	Result	Competition
1	20 August 2000	New York City, United States	Haiti	4–0	4–0	friendly match
