= Jiang Pengxiang =

Chinese footballer (born 1981)

Jiang Pengxiang 姜鹏翔
Personal information
- Date of birth: 9 February 1981 (age 45)
- Place of birth: Shenyang, Liaoning, China
- Height: 1.79 m (5 ft 10 1/2 in)
- Position: Midfielder

Youth career
- 1996–2000: Changchun Yatai

Senior career*
| Years | Team | Apps | (Gls) |
| 2001–2014 | Changchun Yatai | 189 | (9) |
- * Club domestic league appearances and goals as of 4 November 2013

Jiang Pengxiang (simplified Chinese: 姜鹏翔; traditional Chinese: 姜鵬翔; pinyin: Jiāng Péngxiáng; born February 9, 1981, in Shenyang, Liaoning) is a Chinese football player.

== Club career ==
Jiang Pengxiang played for various youth teams in Liaoning before moving to Changchun where he joined Changchun Yatai to start his professional football career. In 2001, he became a squad regular in an ambitious side looking for promotion to the top tier. He was involved in the 2001 China Jia B League Match Fixing scandal and received a ban of one year in 2002. Although the team won the 2003 league title there was no promotion that year and he had to wait until Changchun Yatai won promotion at the end of the 2005 league season. Playing in the top tier, he continued to establish himself at the heart of their midfield and proved his importance to the team when he aided them to a surprising fourth-place finish. In the following season, he continued to play his part in the team that went on to win the 2007 Chinese Super League title.

== Honours ==
- Chinese Super League: 2007
- Chinese Jia B League: 2003
