= Liu Zhao (footballer) =

Chinese footballer

Liu Zhao 刘钊
Personal information
- Full name: Liu Zhao
- Date of birth: January 11, 1985 (age 41)
- Place of birth: Qingdao, Shandong, China
- Height: 1.78 m (5 ft 10 in)
- Positions: Left-back; striker

Youth career
- 1999–2003: Shandong Luneng

Senior career*
Years	Team	Apps	(Gls)
2003–2011	Shandong Luneng	41	(0)
Medal record
Representing China
Men's football
AFC Youth Championship
Silver medal – second place	2004 َ Malaysia	Team
- * Club domestic league appearances and goals as of 1 Jan 2012

Liu Zhao (simplified Chinese: 刘钊; traditional Chinese: 劉釗; pinyin: Liú Zhāo; born 11 January 1985 in Qingdao, Shandong) is a Chinese former football player who lasted played for Shandong Luneng. He is a versatile left-footed player who is able to play in numerous positions on the left side of the field.

== Club career ==
A graduate of the Shandong Luneng youth system, Liu Zhao would begin his professional football career when he made his senior club debut on July 6, 2003 in a league game vs Beijing Guo'an. Due to injury Liu Zhao was, however, unable to add many more games to his debut and while he scored his first goal for Shandong on May 26, 2005 in an AFC Champions League group game vs BEC Tero Sasana FC, in Thailand from a free-kick in a 4-0 win he would still spend much of the season injured. It was only within the 2008 Chinese Super League when Liu Zhao spent much of the season injury free that he started to establish himself within the Shandong team when he played in ten league games and helped them win the league title. After finally establishing himself as a regular within the side throughout the 2009 campaign the club brought in Branko Ivanković the following season to win back the league title, however this saw Liu Zhao limited to only four league appearances while Shandong won the 2010 Chinese Super League. After being unable to break back into the team the following season and with his contract now finished, Liu Zhao would decide to leave the club.

== Honours ==
Shandong Luneng

- Chinese Super League: 2008, 2010
