= Wang Dong (footballer, born 1981) =

Chinese footballer

Wang Dong 王栋
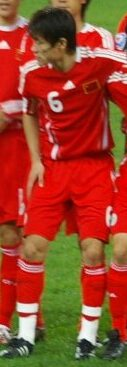

Personal information
- Date of birth: 10 September 1981 (age 45)
- Place of birth: Qingdao, Shandong, China
- Height: 1.81 m (5 ft 11 in)
- Position: Midfielder

Youth career
- 1995: Qingdao Hainiu
- 1996–2000: Changchun Yatai

Senior career*
Years	Team	Apps	(Gls)
2001–2013	Changchun Yatai	251	(69)
2013	→ Shandong Tengding (Loan)	9	(8)
2014–2016	Chongqing Lifan	87	(25)
2017–2019	Tianjin Teda	15	(0)
2018–2019	→ Qingdao Huanghai (Loan)	51	(15)
2020	Qingdao Huanghai	10	(1)
2024	Shenzhen 2028	0	(0)

International career^{‡}
2006–2009	China	30	(4)

Managerial career
- 2020: Qingdao Huanghai (assistant)
- 2021: Zibo Cuju (assistant)
- 2022: Inner Mongolia Caoshangfei
- 2024: Shenzhen 2028
- 2026: Changchun Xidu
Medal record
Representing China
Men's football
EAFF Championship
Bronze medal – third place	2008 China	Team
- * Club domestic league appearances and goals as of 27 April 2021 ‡ National team caps and goals as of 12 November 2014

Wang Dong (simplified Chinese: 王栋; traditional Chinese: 王棟; pinyin: Wáng Dòng; born 10 September 1981) is a Chinese football manager and former player.

== Club career ==
Wang Dong began his professional football career in 2001 when second division side Changchun Yatai promoted him to their first team and where in his debut season he would quickly establish himself within the team by making 19 appearances and scoring 5 goals. He continued to establish himself in the subsequent seasons and see the club become genuine promotion contenders, which they eventually achieved in 2005 when they won promoted to the Chinese Super League. Playing in the top tier Wang Dong impressed many with his scoring and passing ability and would aid the club to a fourth-place finish. The Chinese Super League 2007 season would go on to be a highlight in his career as he won the title with Changchun Yatai playing a key role in central midfield.

At the beginning of the 2009 league season Wang Dong saw his playing time limited due to injury, however once he recovered he decided to go on trial for Australian team Newcastle Jets. When nothing came from the trial and with Wang Dong fully recovered he would return to China to go on to spearhead Changchun's late title challenge, which saw the club lose the title by a single point at the end of the 2009 season. With Wang Dong once again a vital member of the team he would then go on to play in the 2010 AFC Champions League where he played in five games including a 9–0 victory against Persipura Jayapura, which stands as the biggest victory any Chinese side has achieved within the competition.

In January 2014, Wang transferred to China League One side Chongqing Lifan with a fee of ¥3,500,000. On 13 December 2016, Wang moved to Super League side Tianjin Teda. On 8 February 2018, Wang was loaned to his hometown club Qingdao Huanghai in the China League One.

== International career ==
Wang Dong was selected for the senior national team by head coach Zhu Guanghu to take part in a friendly against Honduras on February 12, 2006, in a game that China lost 1–0. This was followed by another friendly match against Thailand on August 10, 2006, where Wang Dong would score his debut goal in a 4–0 victory. After that game he would go on to be an integral part of the Chinese team playing predominantly out of position in right midfield. Nevertheless, Wang Dong was selected in the squad to participate in the 2007 AFC Asian Cup where he played in all the group games in an unsuccessful competition for China. He did however score two of China's five goals in a 5–1 victory over Malaysia. When new head coach Vladimir Petrović came in after the tournament Wang Dong would continue to be a regular within the team for their Fifa World Cup qualifiers. After Vladimir Petrović's disappointing reign ended Wang Dong would stop being called up to the national team.

== Coaching career ==
On 18 January 2026, Wang was appointed as the head coach of China League Two club Changchun Xidu. After 11 days, Wang left his position as he was given a lifetime ban for match-fixing by the Chinese Football Association.

== Career statistics ==
=== Club ===
As of 31 December 2020.

Appearances and goals by club, season and competition
Club	Season	League			National Cup		Continental		Other		Total	
Club	Season	Division	Apps	Goals	Apps	Goals	Apps	Goals	Apps	Goals	Apps	Goals
Changchun Yatai	2001	Chinese Jia-B League	19	5	1	1	-		-		20	6
Changchun Yatai	2002	Chinese Jia-B League	0	0		0	-		-		0	0
Changchun Yatai	2003	Chinese Jia-B League	24	6		0	-		-		24	6
Changchun Yatai	2004	China League One	26	12		0	-		-		26	12
Changchun Yatai	2005	China League One	24	14		0	-		-		24	14
Changchun Yatai	2006	Chinese Super League	26	5		0	-		-		26	5
Changchun Yatai	2007	Chinese Super League	23	6	-		-		-		23	6
Changchun Yatai	2008	Chinese Super League	19	6	-		5	1	-		24	7
Changchun Yatai	2009	Chinese Super League	8	1	-		-		-		8	1
Changchun Yatai	2010	Chinese Super League	30	6	-		5	0	-		35	6
Changchun Yatai	2011	Chinese Super League	21	2	2	1	-		-		23	3
Changchun Yatai	2012	Chinese Super League	27	6	2	0	-		-		29	6
Changchun Yatai	2013	Chinese Super League	4	0	0	0	-		-		4	0
Changchun Yatai	Total		251	69	5	2	10	1	0	0	266	72
Shandong Tengding (Loan)	2013	China League Two	9	8	0	0	-		-		9	8
Chongqing Lifan	2014	China League One	29	16	0	0	-		-		29	16
Chongqing Lifan	2015	Chinese Super League	29	3	0	0	-		-		29	3
Chongqing Lifan	2016	Chinese Super League	29	7	0	0	-		-		29	7
Chongqing Lifan	Total		87	25	0	0	0	0	0	0	87	25
Tianjin Teda	2017	Chinese Super League	15	0	0	0	-		-		15	0
Qingdao Huanghai (Loan)	2018	China League One	22	5	0	0	-		-		22	5
Qingdao Huanghai (Loan)	2019	China League One	29	10	0	0	-		-		29	10
Qingdao Huanghai (Loan)	Total		51	15	0	0	0	0	0	0	51	15
Qingdao Huanghai	2020	Chinese Super League	10	1	1	0	-		-		11	1
Career total			423	119	6	2	10	1	0	0	439	122

=== International ===
Appearances and goals by national team and year
National team	Year	Apps	Goals
China	2006	5	1
China	2007	10	2
China	2008	13	1
China	2009	2	0
Total		30	4

Scores and results list China's goal tally first, score column indicates score after each Dong goal.

List of international goals scored by Wang Dong
No.	Date	Venue	Opponent	Score	Result	Competition	Ref.
1	10 August 2006	Workers' Stadium, Beijing, China	Thailand	2–0	4–0	Friendly	
2	10 July 2007	Bukit Jalil National Stadium, Kuala Lumpur, Malaysia	Malaysia	3–0	5–1	2007 AFC Asian Cup	
3	10 July 2007	Bukit Jalil National Stadium, Kuala Lumpur, Malaysia	Malaysia	5–1	5–1	2007 AFC Asian Cup	
4	23 February 2008	Chongqing Olympic Sports Center, Chongqing, China	North Korea	2–1	3–1	2008 East Asian Football Championship	

== Honours ==
=== Club ===
Changchun Yatai

- Chinese Super League: 2007
- Chinese Jia B League: 2003

Chongqing Lifan

- China League One: 2014

Qingdao Huanghai

- China League One: 2019

=== Individual ===
- China League One Most Valuable Player: 2014
