= Liu Xiaodong (footballer) =

Chinese footballer

Liu Xiaodong 刘晓东
Personal information
- Date of birth: June 14, 1988 (age 38)
- Place of birth: Changchun, Jilin, China
- Height: 1.80 m (5 ft 11 in)
- Position: Midfielder

Team information
- Current team: Changchun Yatai (assistant coach)

Youth career
- 1997–2007: Changchun Yatai

Senior career*
Years	Team	Apps	(Gls)
2008–2016	Changchun Yatai	111	(4)
2016	→ Baoding Yingli Yitong (loan)	11	(2)
2017	Baoding Yingli Yitong	29	(2)
2018–2020	Liaoning FC	19	(0)
2020	Guangxi Pingguo Haliao	8	(1)

International career^{‡}
2011	China	1	(0)

Managerial career
- 2021–2024: Changchun Dazhong Zhuoyue (assistant)
- 2025: Nanjing City (assistant)
- 2026–: Changchun Yatai (assistant)
- * Club domestic league appearances and goals as of 21 December 2023 ‡ National team caps and goals as of 4 November 2013

Liu Xiaodong (simplified Chinese: 刘晓东; traditional Chinese: 劉曉東; pinyin: Liú Xiǎodōng; born June 14, 1988) is a Chinese football coach and former football midfielder.

== Club career ==
A native of Changchun, Jilin, Liu Xiaodong began his football career when he joined the Changchun Yatai youth team where he eventually graduated to the senior team at the start of the 2008 Chinese Super League season. He started his professional football career when he made his debut against Wuhan Guanggu on April 27, 2008 in a 1-0 win (though this score was changed to 3-0 because of Wuhan's withdrawal from the league) and his appearance was to make him the first native Changchun player to actually play for Changchun Yatai. He later scored his first senior club goal against Shenzhen on June 25, 2008 in a 2-1 win. Throughout the season he was mostly used as substitute to gain playing time and eventually made sixteen league appearances.

In March 2016, Liu was loaned to China League Two side Baoding Yingli Yitong until 31 December 2016. He made a permanent transfer to Baoding Yingli Yitong in February 2017.

On 28 February 2018, Liu transferred to Liaoning FC

=== Manager career ===
At June 2021, Liu joined Chinese Women's Super League club Changchun Dazhong Zhuoyue as first team assistant coach.

On 21 January 2025, Liu joined China League One club Nanjing City as assistant coach.

On 1 January 2026, Liu joined China League One club Changchun Yatai as assistant coach.

== International career ==
Liu Xiaodong was called up to the senior Chinese squad to take part in a friendly against Honduras on March 29, 2011 and went on to make his debut when he came on as a late substitute for Hao Junmin in a 3-0 victory.

== Career statistics ==
As of 31 December 2020.

Appearances and goals by club, season and competition
Club	Season	League			National Cup		Continental		Other		Total	
Club	Season	Division	Apps	Goals	Apps	Goals	Apps	Goals	Apps	Goals	Apps	Goals
Changchun Yatai	2008	Chinese Super League	16	1	-		-		-		16	1
Changchun Yatai	2009	Chinese Super League	20	2	-		-		-		20	2
Changchun Yatai	2010	Chinese Super League	22	1	-		-		-		22	1
Changchun Yatai	2011	Chinese Super League	12	0	0	0	-		-		12	0
Changchun Yatai	2012	Chinese Super League	22	0	1	0	-		-		23	0
Changchun Yatai	2013	Chinese Super League	12	0	1	0	-		-		13	0
Changchun Yatai	2014	Chinese Super League	7	0	1	0	-		-		8	0
Changchun Yatai	2015	Chinese Super League	0	0	0	0	-		-		0	0
Changchun Yatai	Total		111	4	3	0	0	0	0	0	114	4
Baoding Yingli Yitong (loan)	2016	China League Two	11	2	1	1	-		-		12	3
Baoding Yingli Yitong	2017	China League One	29	2	0	0	-		-		29	2
Liaoning F.C.	2018	China League One	19	0	0	0	-		-		19	0
Liaoning F.C.	2019	China League One	0	0	0	0	-		-		0	0
Liaoning F.C.	Total		19	0	0	0	0	0	0	0	19	0
Guangxi Pingguo Haliao	2020	China League Two	8	1	-		-		-		8	1
Career total			178	9	4	0	0	0	0	0	182	9
