= Pan Chaoran =

Chinese footballer

Pan Chaoran 潘超然
Personal information
- Date of birth: April 21, 1992 (age 34)
- Place of birth: Wuhan, Hubei, China
- Height: 1.80 m (5 ft 11 in)
- Position: Winger

Team information
- Current team: Qingdao Youth Island

Senior career*
Years	Team	Apps	(Gls)
2009–2014	Changchun Yatai	1	(0)
2011–2012	→ Nanchang Bayi (loan)	11	(0)
2016	Hainan Seamen	20	(2)
2017–2019	Shanghai Shenxin	50	(8)
2019–2020	Shijiazhuang Ever Bright	0	(0)
2021	Heilongjiang Ice City	16	(1)
2022-	Qingdao Youth Island	0	(0)
- * Club domestic league appearances and goals as of 28 April 2022

Pan Chaoran (Chinese: 潘超然; born 21 April 1992) is a Chinese professional footballer who currently plays as a winger for China League One club Qingdao Youth Island.

== Club career ==
In 2009, Pan Chaoran started his professional footballer career with Changchun Yatai in the Chinese Super League.

In July 2011，Pan moved to Chinese Super League side Nanchang Bayi on a one-year loan deal. He eventually made his league debut for Nanchang on 14 July 2011 in a game against Guangzhou Evergrande, coming on as a substitute for Ko Jae-Sung in the 51st minute. He was released by Changchun at the end of 2014 season.

In March 2016, Pan was signed by China League Two club Hainan Seamen. In February 2017, Pan transferred to League One side Shanghai Shenxin.

== Career statistics ==
As of 31 December 2020.

Appearances and goals by club, season and competition
Club	Season	League			National Cup		Continental		Other		Total	
Club	Season	Division	Apps	Goals	Apps	Goals	Apps	Goals	Apps	Goals	Apps	Goals
Changchun Yatai	2009	Chinese Super League	0	0	-		-		-		0	0
Changchun Yatai	2010	Chinese Super League	0	0	-		-		-		0	0
Changchun Yatai	2011	Chinese Super League	0	0	0	0	-		-		0	0
Changchun Yatai	2012	Chinese Super League	1	0	1	0	-		-		2	0
Changchun Yatai	2013	Chinese Super League	0	0	1	0	-		-		1	0
Changchun Yatai	2014	Chinese Super League	0	0	1	0	-		-		1	0
Changchun Yatai	Total		1	0	3	0	0	0	0	0	4	0
Nanchang Bayi (loan)	2011	Chinese Super League	9	0	0	0	-		-		9	0
Nanchang Bayi (loan)	2012	Chinese Super League	3	0	0	0	-		-		3	0
Nanchang Bayi (loan)	Total		12	0	0	0	0	0	0	0	12	0
Hainan Seamen	2016	China League Two	20	1	2	0	-		-		22	1
Shanghai Shenxin	2017	China League One	30	6	6	0	-		-		36	6
Shanghai Shenxin	2018	China League One	14	0	2	1	-		-		16	1
Shanghai Shenxin	2019	China League One	6	1	1	1	-		-		7	2
Shanghai Shenxin	Total		50	7	9	2	0	0	0	0	59	9
Career total			83	8	14	2	0	0	0	0	97	10
