= Lü Jianjun =

Chinese footballer

Lü Jianjun 吕建军
Personal information
- Date of birth: 1 August 1985 (age 41)
- Place of birth: Dalian, Liaoning, China
- Height: 1.80 m (5 ft 11 in)
- Position: Defender

Team information
- Current team: Shijiazhuang Ever Bright
- Number: 24

Senior career*
Years	Team	Apps	(Gls)
2003	Dalian Shide	0	(0)
2004–2005	Dalian Changbo	39	(2)
2006–2007	Harbin Yiteng	13	(0)
2008–2014	Changchun Yatai	142	(2)
2015	Henan Jianye	16	(0)
2016–	Shijiazhuang Ever Bright	96	(0)

International career
2006–2008	China U-23		
- * Club domestic league appearances and goals as of 31 December 2020

Lü Jianjun (simplified Chinese: 吕建军; traditional Chinese: 呂建軍; pinyin: Lǚ Jiànjūn) is a Chinese football player who currently plays as a defender for Shijiazhuang Ever Bright.

== Club career ==
Lü Jianjun played for the Dalian Shide youth team, where he was highly regarded and compared to the Chinese international player Sun Jihai as well as also acquiring the nickname "Great White" due to his pale complexion. He struggled to follow in the former Chinese internationals alumnus footsteps and break into the first team. He instead officially started his professional football career with Dalian Changbo, playing in the second tier of Chinese soccer. Making an immediate impact within the team in his debut season he played 23 games and scoring 2 goals in his debut season.

In the 2006 Chinese league season he transferred to ambitious third-tier club Harbin Yiteng where he immediately saw them win promotion to the second tier. This was soon followed by his selection for the Chinese U-23 football team before returning to his club where he played in 13 games throughout the 2007 league season. His performances for the Chinese youth team soon attracted the interests of Changchun Yatai who paid a transfer of CNY 1,000,000 and the chance to play in the Chinese Super League at the beginning of the 2008 league season.

On 4 May 2014, Lü returned to his former club Harbin Yiteng for the first time when Changchun played them in the league. The reunion was not a happy one for Lü as Changchun lost the Round 10 game 3-1 as well as picking up a Yellow Card on a tackle against Wang Dalong, which the Harbin manager Xin Duan thought was too lenient.

In February 2015, Lü transferred to Chinese Super League side Henan Jianye. Lü moved to another Super League club Shijiazhuang Ever Bright on 26 February 2016. Unfortunately he was part of the team that was relegated, however by the 2019 league season he would help the team win promotion back into the top tier.

== International career ==
After some decent performances for his club, Lü Jianjun was called up to the Chinese U-23 team that took part in the 2007 Lunar New Year Cup. The team became runner-up in the competition and Lü Jianjun went on to be selected for the senior national team in March 2007. He did not see any playing time and returned to the Under-23 team in hopes of playing in the Football at the 2008 Summer Olympics but lost his place to Tan Wangsong.

== Career statistics ==
As of 31 December 2020.

Appearances and goals by club, season and competition
Club	Season	League			National Cup		Continental		Other		Total	
Club	Season	Division	Apps	Goals	Apps	Goals	Apps	Goals	Apps	Goals	Apps	Goals
Dalian Shide	2003	Jia-A League	0	0	0	0	-		-		0	0
Dalian Changbo	2004	China League One	23	2	1	0	-		-		24	2
Dalian Changbo	2005	China League One	16	0	0	0	-		-		16	0
Dalian Changbo	Total		39	2	1	0	0	0	0	0	40	2
Harbin Yiteng	2006	China League Two	0	0	-		-		-		0	0
Harbin Yiteng	2007	China League One	13	0	-		-		-		13	0
Harbin Yiteng	Total		13	0	0	0	0	0	0	0	13	0
Changchun Yatai	2008	Chinese Super League	13	1	-		5	0	-		18	1
Changchun Yatai	2009	Chinese Super League	11	0	-		-		-		11	0
Changchun Yatai	2010	Chinese Super League	16	1	-		3	0	-		19	1
Changchun Yatai	2011	Chinese Super League	25	0	2	0	-		-		27	0
Changchun Yatai	2012	Chinese Super League	27	0	2	0	-		-		29	0
Changchun Yatai	2013	Chinese Super League	21	0	1	0	-		-		22	1
Changchun Yatai	2014	Chinese Super League	29	0	0	0	-		-		29	0
Changchun Yatai	Total		142	2	5	0	8	0	0	0	155	2
Henan Jianye	2015	Chinese Super League	16	0	1	0	-		-		17	0
Shijiazhuang Ever Bright	2016	Chinese Super League	13	0	1	1	-		-		14	1
Shijiazhuang Ever Bright	2017	China League One	27	0	0	0	-		-		27	0
Shijiazhuang Ever Bright	2018	China League One	29	0	0	0	-		-		29	0
Shijiazhuang Ever Bright	2019	China League One	27	0	0	0	-		-		27	0
Shijiazhuang Ever Bright	Total		96	0	1	1	0	0	0	0	97	1
Career total			306	4	8	1	8	0	0	0	322	5
