= Leandro Netto =

Brazilian footballer

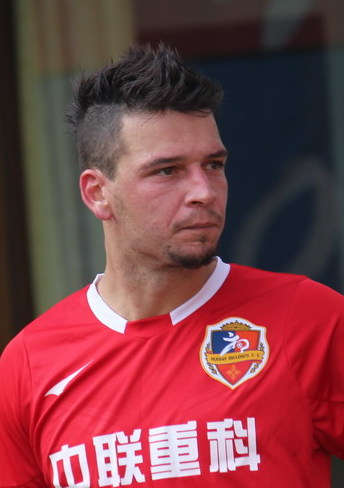
- Netto being presented by Hunan Billows

Personal information
- Full name: Leandro Netto de Macedo
- Date of birth: 7 May 1979 (age 47)
- Place of birth: Rio de Janeiro, Brazil
- Height: 1.85 m (6 ft 1 in)
- Position: Centre forward

Senior career*
| Years | Team | Apps | (Gls) |
| 1998 | Corinthians | 3 | (0) |
| 1999 | Atlético Paranaense | 20 | (4) |
| 2000 | Madureira | 0 | (0) |
| 2000–2002 | Académica | 39 | (8) |
| 2000 | → Deportivo La Coruña (loan) | 0 | (0) |
| 2002–2003 | OFK Beograd | 8 | (1) |
| 2003–2005 | Ovarense | 39 | (11) |
| 2005–2006 | Gil Vicente | 15 | (0) |
| 2006 | Leixões | 9 | (2) |
| 2006–2007 | Trofense | 26 | (1) |
| 2007 | Al-Karamah | | |
| 2008 | Mesquita | ? | (7) |
| 2008 | Brasiliense | 15 | (1) |
| 2009 | Mesquita | 0 | (0) |
| 2009–2012 | Henan Construction | 101 | (37) |
| 2013 | Hunan Billows | 28 | (14) |
| 2014 | Metropolitano | 3 | (1) |
| 2014 | Sampaio Corrêa | 1 | (0) |
| 2016 | Ferroviário Atlético clube | | |
- * Club domestic league appearances and goals

Leandro Netto de Macedo (born 7 May 1979) is a Brazilian former footballer who played as a centre forward.

== Football career ==
Netto was born in Rio de Janeiro. He began his senior career with Sport Club Corinthians Paulista and Clube Atlético Paranaense in the Série A, and also played with Madureira Esporte Clube in the Campeonato Carioca.

With the exception of one year in Serbia in the First League of FR Yugoslavia, and a few months in Spain with Deportivo de La Coruña's reserves (loaned by Académica de Coimbra), Netto spent his first eight years as a professional in Portugal, representing five teams almost always in the second division. His only Primeira Liga experience occurred in 2005–06, when he went scoreless for Gil Vicente F.C. in a relegation-ending season, due to irregularities; in the 2006 January transfer window, he had already moved to Leixões SC.

After one year in Syria with Al-Karamah SC – which he helped win the double in 2007 – Netto played in his native Brazil, including a spell in the regional leagues, after which he settled in China with Henan Construction FC. He helped the newly promoted Chinese Super League side to the third place in 2009, and consistently ranked amongst the competition's top scorers in the following campaigns.

In 2014, Netto returned to Brazil: after a brief spell with Clube Atlético Metropolitano, he joined Série B club Sampaio Corrêa Futebol Clube.

In 2016, he played for Ferroviário atlético Clube since January till September, and then in Outumn he played with Boca Raton FC in the American Premier Soccer League.

== Honours ==
Al-Karamah

- Syrian Premier League: 2006–07
- Syrian Cup: 2006–07

Brasiliense

- Campeonato Brasiliense: 2008
