= Wang Wanpeng =

Chinese footballer

Wang Wanpeng 王万鹏
Personal information
- Date of birth: 9 June 1982 (age 44)
- Place of birth: Dalian, Liaoning, China
- Height: 1.86 m (6 ft 1 in)
- Position: Centre-back

Team information
- Current team: Dalian Huayi

Youth career
- 1988–1995: Dalian Yihai
- 1995–1996: Dalian Hengfeng
- 1996–1997: Shanghai Hengsheng
- 1997–2000: Changchun Yatai

Senior career*
Years	Team	Apps	(Gls)
2001–2014	Changchun Yatai	213	(6)
2015–2018	Dalian Yifang	89	(6)
2018	→ Dalian Transcendence (loan)	17	(0)
2019–2020	Yinchuan Helanshan	24	(3)

International career^{‡}
2008	China	1	(0)
- * Club domestic league appearances and goals as of 22 December 2023 ‡ National team caps and goals as of 4 November 2013

Wang Wanpeng (simplified Chinese: 王万鹏; traditional Chinese: 王萬鵬; pinyin: Wáng Wànpéng, born June 9, 1982, in Dalian, Liaoning) is a Chinese former footballer.

== Club career ==
After playing for various youth teams in Dalian and Shanghai, Wang would settle at Changchun where he would join Changchun Yatai to start his career. Beginning his professional football career in 2001 he would become a squad regular and help them win the second tier league title in the 2003 league season. Unfortunately there was no promotion that year and he would have to wait until Changchun Yatai came second in the 2005 league season when they won promotion to the China Super League. He was diagnosed with heart disease in early 2004 and received surgery on 26 May. He lost his position after the surgery until 2007 when Gao Hongbo became the new manager of the team. He became a start player in the team that would go on to win the 2007 Chinese Super League title. On 19 March 2008, Wang torn the anterior cruciate ligament in his knee in a 2008 AFC Champions League match which Changchun tied with Adelaide United 0–0, ruling him out for the rest of the season. He returned to field in 2010 season, making 28 appearances as Changchun Yatai reached second place of the league and gained the entry into 2010 AFC Champions League. Wang became a substitute player in 2010 when team manager Shen Xiangfu decided to give chances to young players. He gained back his position in 2011 season, scoring 3 goals in 27 appearances. On 15 October 2011, he waved the finger towards fans in a league match against Beijing Guoan, which resulted in a ban of 6 matches and him being fined ¥30,000. On 31 January 2015, Wang transferred to China League One side Dalian Aerbin. On 14 June 2018, Dalian Yifang announced that he was loaned to Dalian Transcendence for the rest of the season.

On 31 January 2019, Wang transferred to League Two side Yinchuan Helanshan.

== International career ==
On 10 January 2008, Wang Wanpeng made his international debut for China national team in a friendly against United Arab Emirates in a 0–0 away draw.

== Career statistics ==
As of 12 October 2019

Club performance			League		Cup		League Cup		Continental		Total	
Season	Club	League	Apps	Goals	Apps	Goals	Apps	Goals	Apps	Goals	Apps	Goals
China PR			League		FA Cup		CSL Cup		Asia		Total	
2001	Changchun Yatai	Jia B League	7	0	3	0	-		-		10	0
2002	Changchun Yatai	Jia B League	19	1	1	0	-		-		20	1
2003	Changchun Yatai	Jia B League	23	0			-		-		23	0
2004	Changchun Yatai	China League One	5	0	1	1	-		-		6	1
2005	Changchun Yatai	China League One	2	0	0	0	-		-		2	0
2006	Changchun Yatai	Chinese Super League	4	1	0	0	-		-		4	1
2007	Changchun Yatai	Chinese Super League	26	1	-		-		-		26	1
2008	Changchun Yatai	Chinese Super League	0	0	-		-		2	0	2	0
2009	Changchun Yatai	Chinese Super League	28	0	-		-		-		28	0
2010	Changchun Yatai	Chinese Super League	12	0	-		-		4	0	16	0
2011	Changchun Yatai	Chinese Super League	27	3	2	0	-		-		29	3
2012	Changchun Yatai	Chinese Super League	15	0	2	0	-		-		17	0
2013	Changchun Yatai	Chinese Super League	17	0	2	0	-		-		19	0
2014	Changchun Yatai	Chinese Super League	28	1	0	0	-		-		28	1
2015	Dalian Yifang	China League One	30	1	0	0	-		-		30	1
2016	Dalian Yifang	China League One	26	1	0	0	-		-		26	1
2017	Dalian Yifang	China League One	30	3	0	0	-		-		30	3
2018	Dalian Yifang	Chinese Super League	3	0	2	0	-		-		5	0
2018	Dalian Transcendence	China League One	17	0	0	0	-		-		17	0
2019	Yinchuan Helanshan	China League Two	24	3	1	0	-		-		25	3
Total	China PR		343	15	14	1	0	0	6	0	363	16

== Honours ==
=== Club ===
Changchun Yatai

- Chinese Super League: 2007
- Chinese Jia B League: 2003

Dalian Yifang

- China League One: 2017
