= Zhang Xiaofei (footballer) =

Chinese footballer

Zhang Xiaofei 张笑非
Personal information
- Full name: Zhang Xiaofei
- Date of birth: 11 July 1982 (age 44)
- Place of birth: Shenyang, Liaoning, China
- Height: 1.79 m (5 ft 10 in)
- Position: Left-back

Youth career
- 2000: Changchun Canyi
- 2001–2002: Changchun Yatai

Senior career*
Years	Team	Apps	(Gls)
2002–2019	Changchun Yatai	447	(4)

International career^{‡}
2007–2008	China	7	(0)
Medal record
Representing China
Men's football
EAFF Championship
Bronze medal – third place	2008 China	Team
- * Club domestic league appearances and goals as of 11 November 2019 ‡ National team caps and goals as of 4 November 2013

Zhang Xiaofei (simplified Chinese: 张笑非; traditional Chinese: 張笑非; pinyin: Zhāng Xiàofēi; born 11 July 1982 in Shenyang) is a professional Chinese footballer.

== Club career ==
Zhang Xiaofei started his senior career with Changchun Yatai, where he made his debut in 2002. The following season he became a regular for the team and by the 2005 season he was an integral part of the Changchun Yatai that were promoted into Chinese Super League. The 2007 season was to prove highly successful for Zhang Xiaofei as he played a vital part in the title winning Changchun Yatai team.

== International career ==
Zhang Xiaofei would make his debut for the Chinese national team on October 28, 2007, against Myanmar in a friendly match that ended in a 4–0 victory. Zhang Xiaofei was named in the squad for the 2010 FIFA World Cup qualification which China were unable to qualify in. He has subsequently played in several friendlies for the team.

== Career statistics ==
Statistics accurate as of match played 11 November 2019.

Club performance			League		Cup		League Cup		Continental		Total	
Season	Club	League	Apps	Goals	Apps	Goals	Apps	Goals	Apps	Goals	Apps	Goals
China PR			League		FA Cup		CSL Cup		Asia		Total	
2002	Changchun Yatai	Jia B League / China League One	28	0			-		-		28	0
2003	Changchun Yatai	Jia B League / China League One	1	0		0	-		-		1	0
2004	Changchun Yatai	Jia B League / China League One	27	1		0	-		-		27	1
2005	Changchun Yatai	Jia B League / China League One	23	0		0	-		-		23	0
2006	Changchun Yatai	Chinese Super League	27	0		0	-		-		27	0
2007	Changchun Yatai	Chinese Super League	28	0	-		-		-		28	0
2008	Changchun Yatai	Chinese Super League	28	0	-		-		6	0	34	0
2009	Changchun Yatai	Chinese Super League	28	0	-		-		-		28	0
2010	Changchun Yatai	Chinese Super League	23	0	-		-		5	0	28	0
2011	Changchun Yatai	Chinese Super League	22	0	1	0	-		-		23	0
2012	Changchun Yatai	Chinese Super League	28	0	2	0	-		-		30	0
2013	Changchun Yatai	Chinese Super League	28	1	1	0	-		-		29	1
2014	Changchun Yatai	Chinese Super League	28	0	0	0	-		-		28	0
2015	Changchun Yatai	Chinese Super League	28	0	0	0	-		-		28	0
2016	Changchun Yatai	Chinese Super League	20	0	0	0	-		-		20	0
2017	Changchun Yatai	Chinese Super League	27	0	0	0	-		-		27	0
2018	Changchun Yatai	Chinese Super League	25	1	0	0	-		-		25	1
2019	Changchun Yatai	China League One	28	1	1	0	-		-		29	1
Total	China PR		447	4	5	0	0	0	11	0	463	4

== Honours ==
- Chinese Super League: 2007
