= Liu Weidong =

Chinese footballer (born 1987)

Liu Weidong 刘卫东
Personal information
- Date of birth: January 29, 1987 (age 39)
- Place of birth: Changchun, Jilin, China
- Height: 1.77 m (5 ft 9 1/2 in)
- Positions: Striker; winger

Youth career
- 2001–2006: Changchun Yatai

Senior career*
Years	Team	Apps	(Gls)
2007–2015	Changchun Yatai	122	(10)
2015	→ Chongqing Lifan (loan)	19	(0)
2016–2019	Chongqing Lifan	25	(2)
- * Club domestic league appearances and goals as of 31 December 2019

Liu Weidong (simplified Chinese: 刘卫东; traditional Chinese: 劉衛東; pinyin: Liú Wèidōng; born 29 January 1987) is a Chinese former association football player.

== Club career ==
Liu started his career playing for Changchun Yatai and would make his league debut for the club on 31 March 2007 against Liaoning F.C. in a 3–2 home victory home. Throughout the season he would often be used as a late substitute, however would earn eight caps in 2007 Chinese Super League season as Changchun would win the league title. The following season would see Liu start more games and his added playing time would see him score his first CSL goal on 11 October 2008, in a 6–0 victory to Guangzhou Pharmaceutical.

On 5 February 2015, Liu was loaned to Chinese Super League side Chongqing Lifan until 31 December 2015. On 19 February 2016, Liu joined Chongqing Lifan on a four-year contract.

== Career statistics ==
As of 31 December 2019.

Appearances and goals by club, season and competition
Club	Season	League			National Cup		Continental		Other		Total	
Club	Season	Division	Apps	Goals	Apps	Goals	Apps	Goals	Apps	Goals	Apps	Goals
Changchun Yatai	2007	Chinese Super League	8	0	-		-		-		8	0
Changchun Yatai	2008	Chinese Super League	7	1	-		0	0	-		7	1
Changchun Yatai	2009	Chinese Super League	12	2	-		-		-		12	2
Changchun Yatai	2010	Chinese Super League	13	0	-		5	2	-		18	2
Changchun Yatai	2011	Chinese Super League	22	0	1	0	-		-		23	0
Changchun Yatai	2012	Chinese Super League	26	5	2	0	-		-		28	5
Changchun Yatai	2013	Chinese Super League	24	2	1	1	-		-		25	3
Changchun Yatai	2014	Chinese Super League	9	0	0	0	-		-		9	0
Changchun Yatai	Total		122	10	4	1	5	2	0	0	131	13
Chongqing Dangdai (Loan)	2015	Chinese Super League	19	0	1	0	-		-		20	0
Chongqing Dangdai	2016	Chinese Super League	10	0	1	0	-		-		11	0
Chongqing Dangdai	2017	Chinese Super League	2	0	0	0	-		-		2	0
Chongqing Dangdai	2018	Chinese Super League	11	2	0	0	-		-		11	2
Chongqing Dangdai	2019	Chinese Super League	2	0	0	0	-		-		2	0
Chongqing Dangdai	Total		25	2	1	0	0	0	0	0	26	2
Career total			165	12	6	1	5	2	0	0	176	15

== Honours ==
Changchun Yatai

- Chinese Super League: 2007
