= Zong Lei =

Chinese footballer

Zong Lei 宗磊
Personal information
- Date of birth: July 26, 1981 (age 45)
- Place of birth: Tianjin, China
- Height: 1.88 m (6 ft 2 in)
- Position: Goalkeeper

Youth career
- 1998–2000: Tianjin Teda

Senior career*
Years	Team	Apps	(Gls)
2001–2003	Tianjin Teda	1	(0)
2004–2005	Shandong Luneng	13	(0)
2006–2012	Changchun Yatai	141	(0)
2013–2016	Tianjin Teda	39	(0)

International career^{‡}
2007–2009	China	12	(0)

Managerial career
- 2021–2022: China U23 (goalkeeping)
Medal record
Representing China
Men's football
EAFF Championship
Bronze medal – third place	2008 China	Team
AFC Youth Championship
Bronze medal – third place	2000 َ Iran	Team
- * Club domestic league appearances and goals as of 30 October 2016 ‡ National team caps and goals as of 16 October 2012

Zong Lei (Chinese: 宗磊; pinyin: Zōng Lěi; born July 26, 1981) is a Chinese former football player who played as a goalkeeper.

== Club career ==
Zong Lei started his football career playing for the Tianjin Teda F.C. youth team before breaking into the senior team during the 2001 league season. While at Tianjin Teda he would struggle to gain any significant playing time and after several seasons he would transfer to Shandong Luneng where he replaced Deng Xiaofei for the goalkeeping position for a short period. It was during this time that he would win the Chinese FA Cup and Super League Cup at the end of the 2004 league season, however the following season saw him lose his place within the team. By the beginning of the 2006 league season newly promoted Changchun Yatai were interested in him and he was allowed to leave after a 2 million yuan transfer. At Changchun Yatai he would immediately become their first choice goalkeeper and see them surprise many by coming fourth in the league. The following season saw him improve upon the previous season's results and he would go on to play a key role in their 2007 Chinese Super League title winning season. Zong returned to Tianjin Teda in 2013. He retired from football at the end of 2016 season.

== International career ==
In preparation for the 2007 AFC Asian Cup Zong Lei would play in a friendly against Kazakhstan on February 2, 2007, where he made his international debut in a game, which China won 2–1. His performance was considered good enough for the Chinese Head coach Zhu Guanghu to include him in the tournament where he was the third choice goalkeeper and did not play in any games. When the new head coach Vladimir Petrović came in immediately after the tournament Zong Lei would be promoted as the national team's first choice goalkeeper and would play in several FIFA World Cup qualifiers. When China failed to qualify and Vladimir Petrović's reign ended Zong Lei would find himself out of favour and was dropped from the subsequent squads.

== Honours ==
Shandong Luneng

- Chinese FA Cup: 2004
- Chinese Super League Cup: 2004

Changchun Yatai

- Chinese Super League: 2007
