= List of association football stadiums by country =

This is a list of major football stadiums, grouped by country and ordered by capacity. The minimum capacity is 10,000.

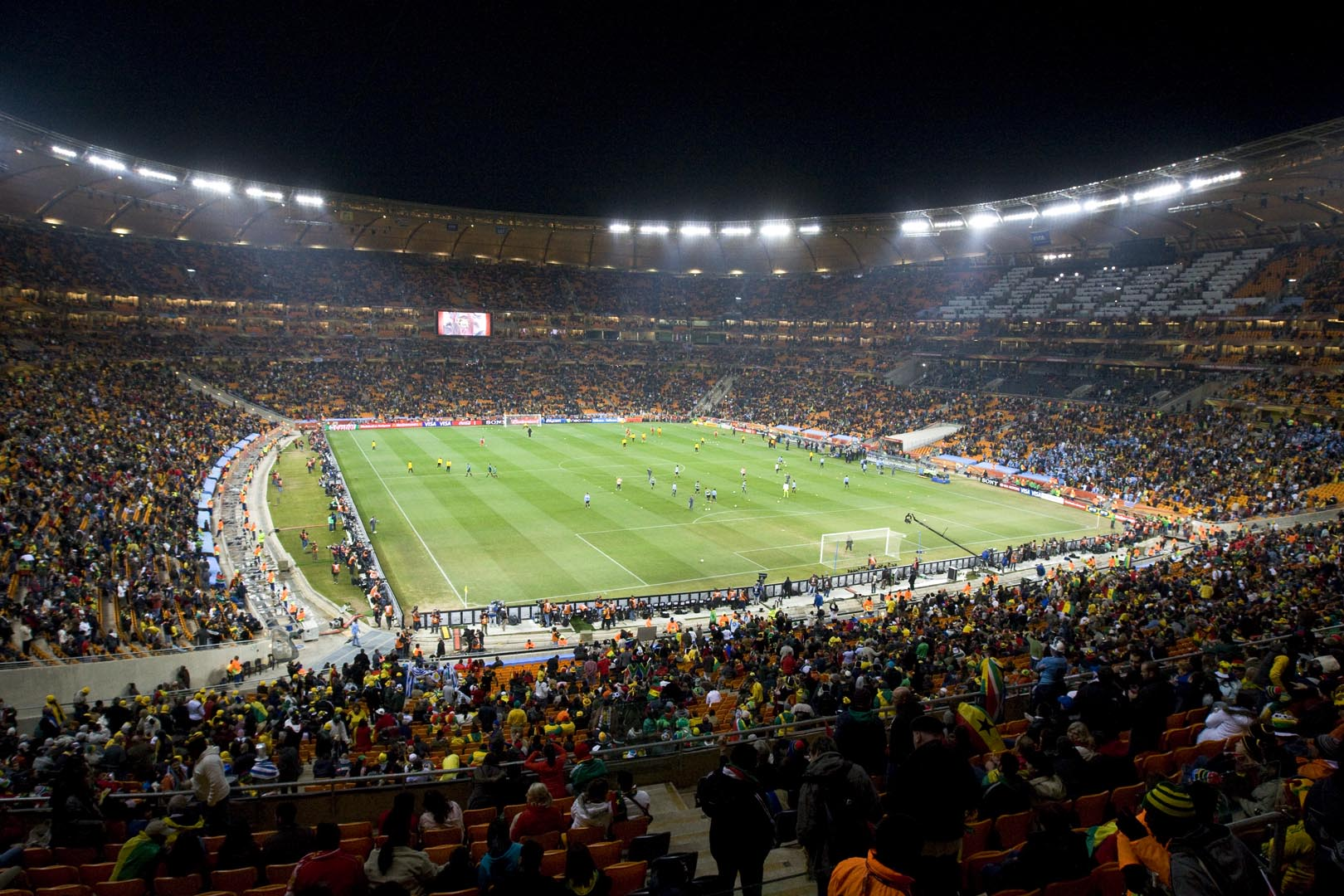
The FNB Stadium in Johannesburg, the home of the Kaizer Chiefs.

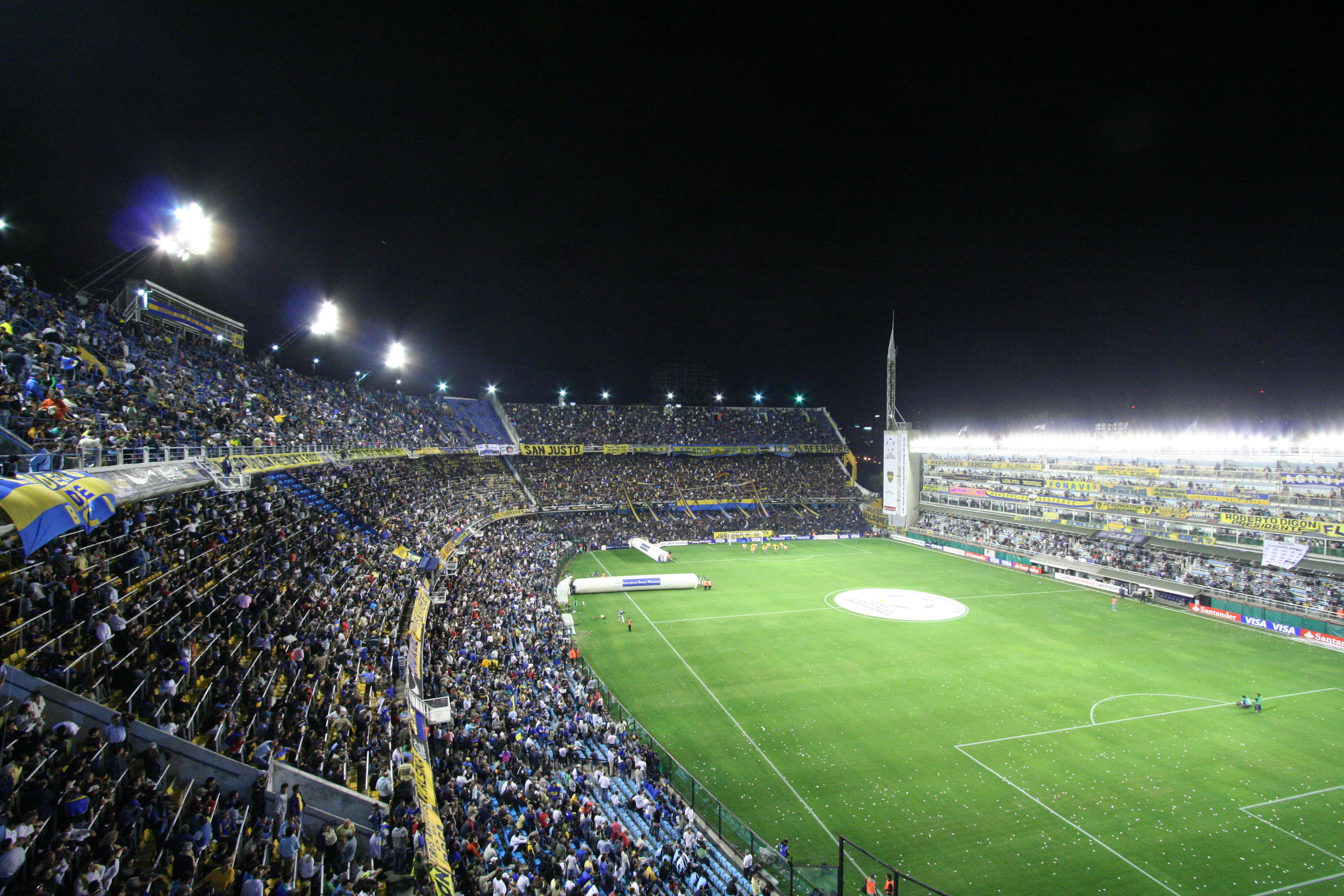
The Estadio Alberto José Armando in Buenos Aires, the home of the Boca Juniors.

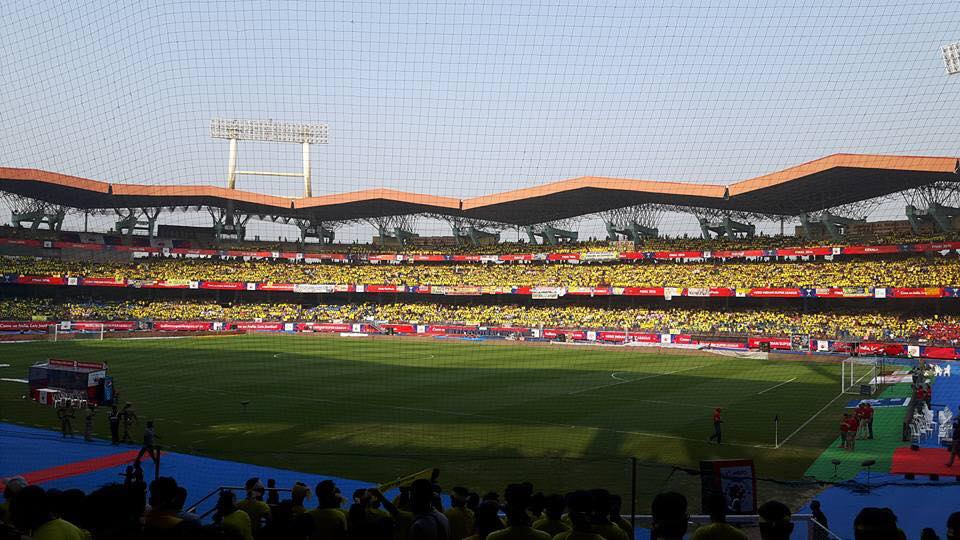
The Jawaharlal Nehru Stadium in Kochi, the home of the Kerala Blasters.

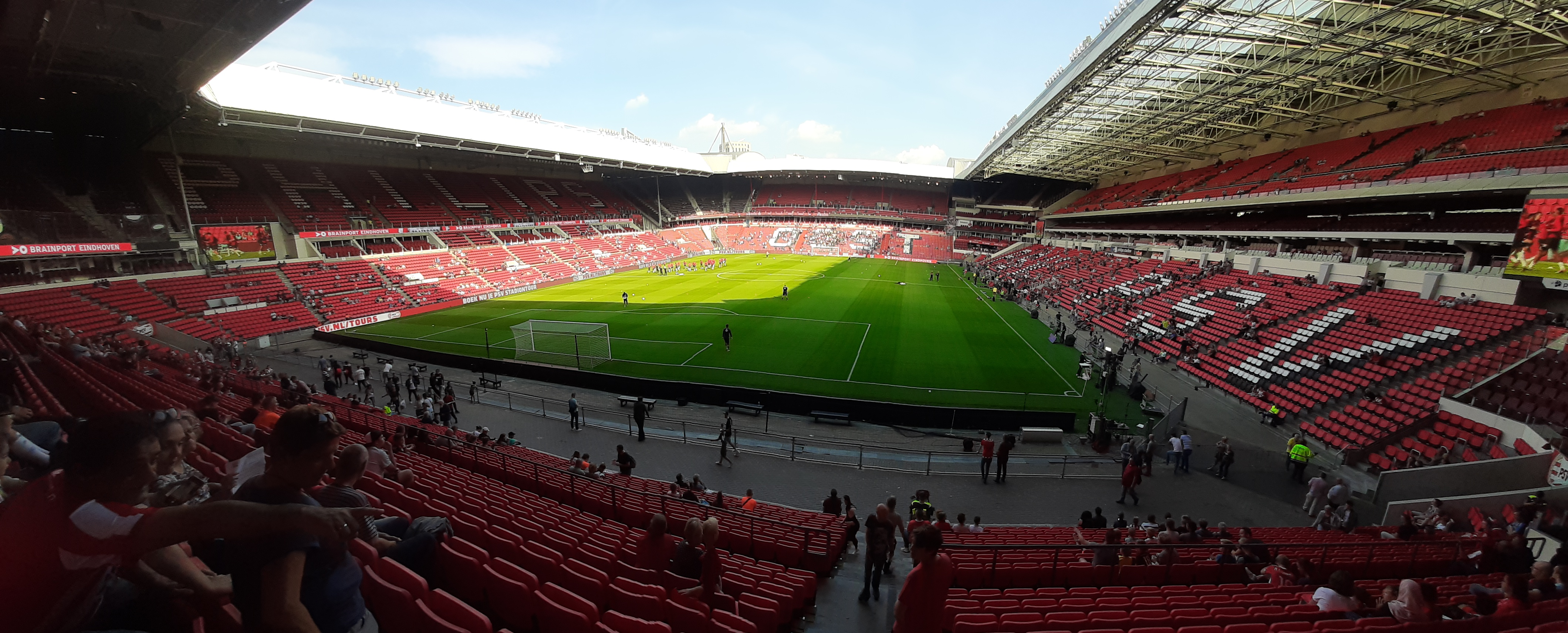
The Philips Stadion in Eindhoven, the home of PSV.

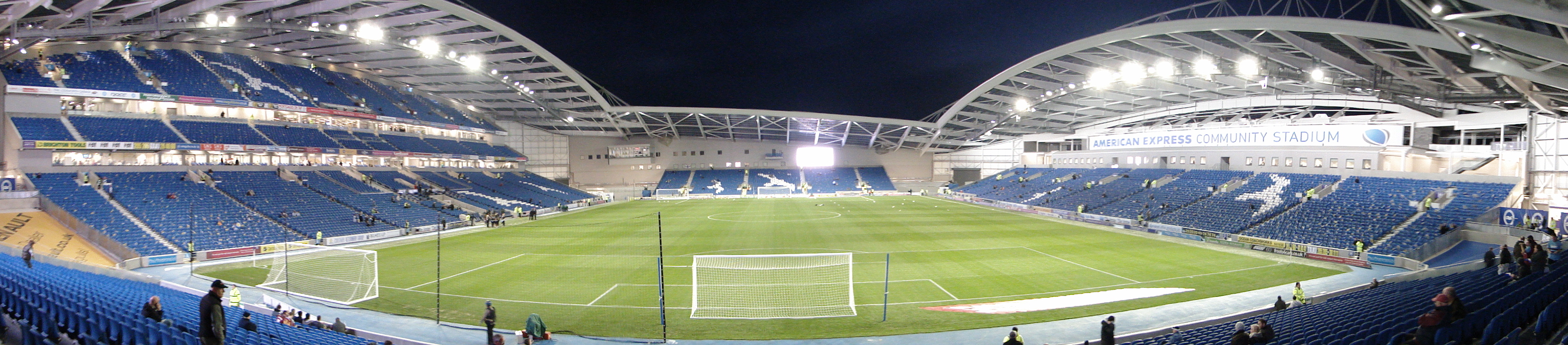
The American Express Stadium in Falmer, the home of Brighton & Hove Albion.

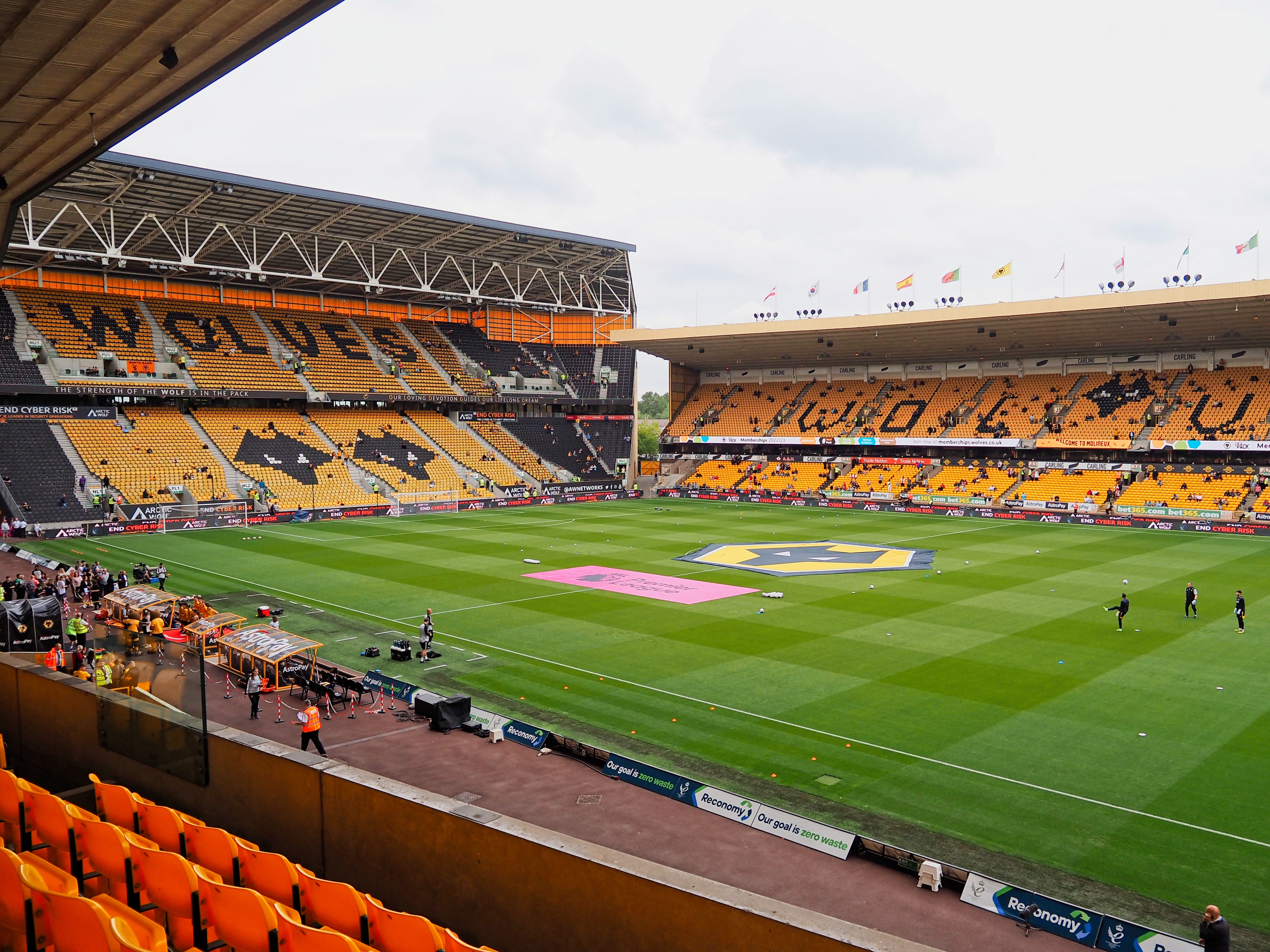
The Molineux Stadium in Wolverhampton, the home of the Wolverhampton Wanderers.

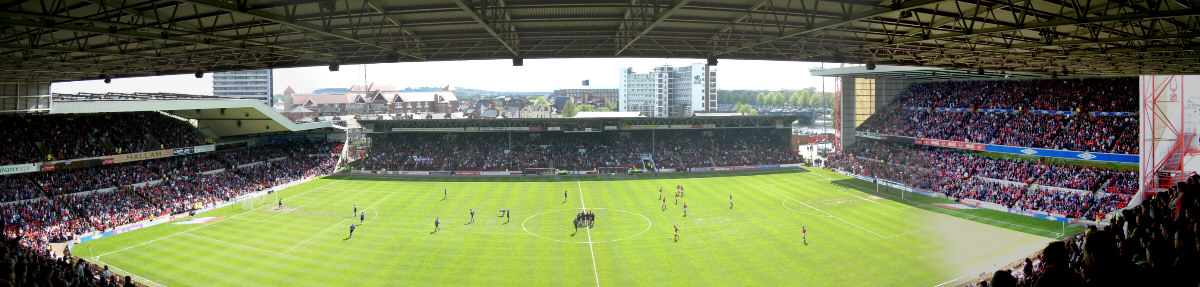
The City Ground in West Bridgford, the home of Nottingham Forest.

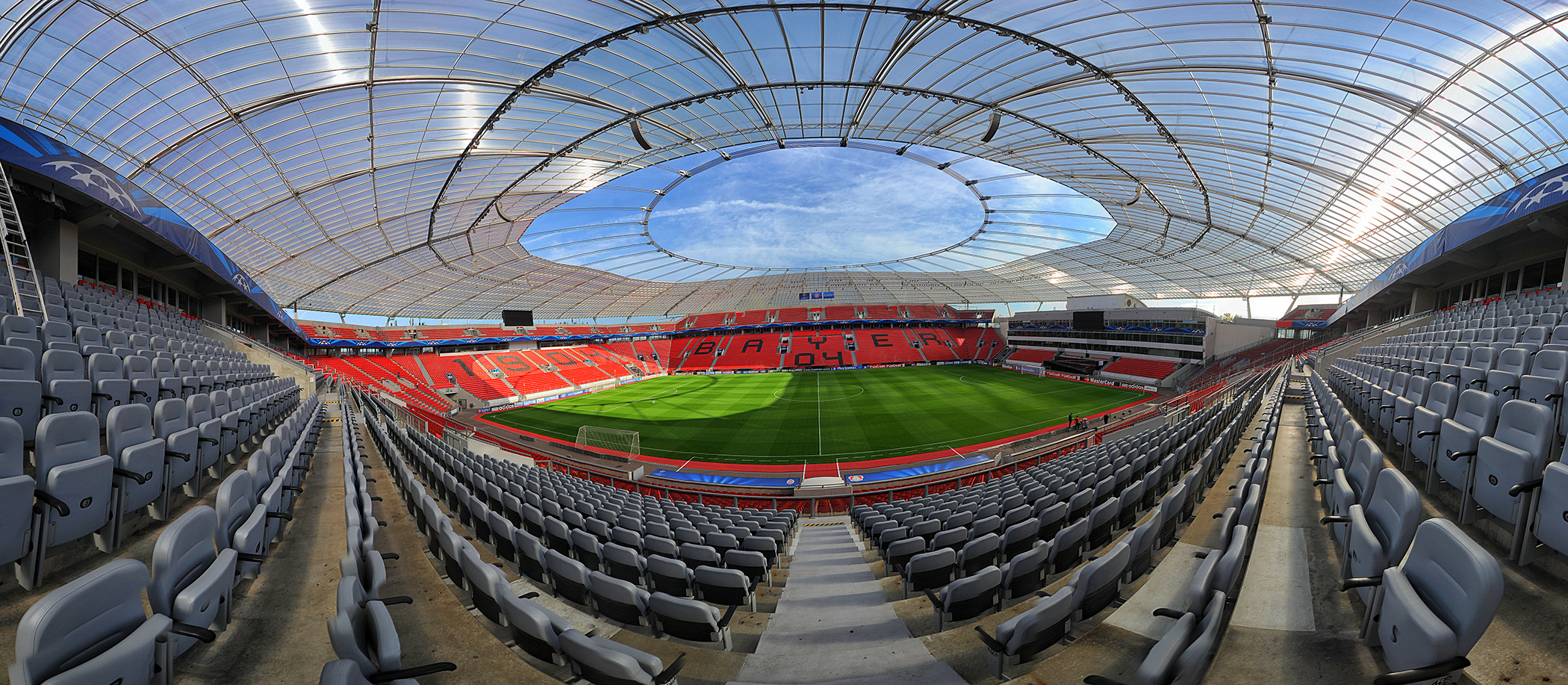
The BayArena in Leverkusen, the home of Bayer Leverkusen.

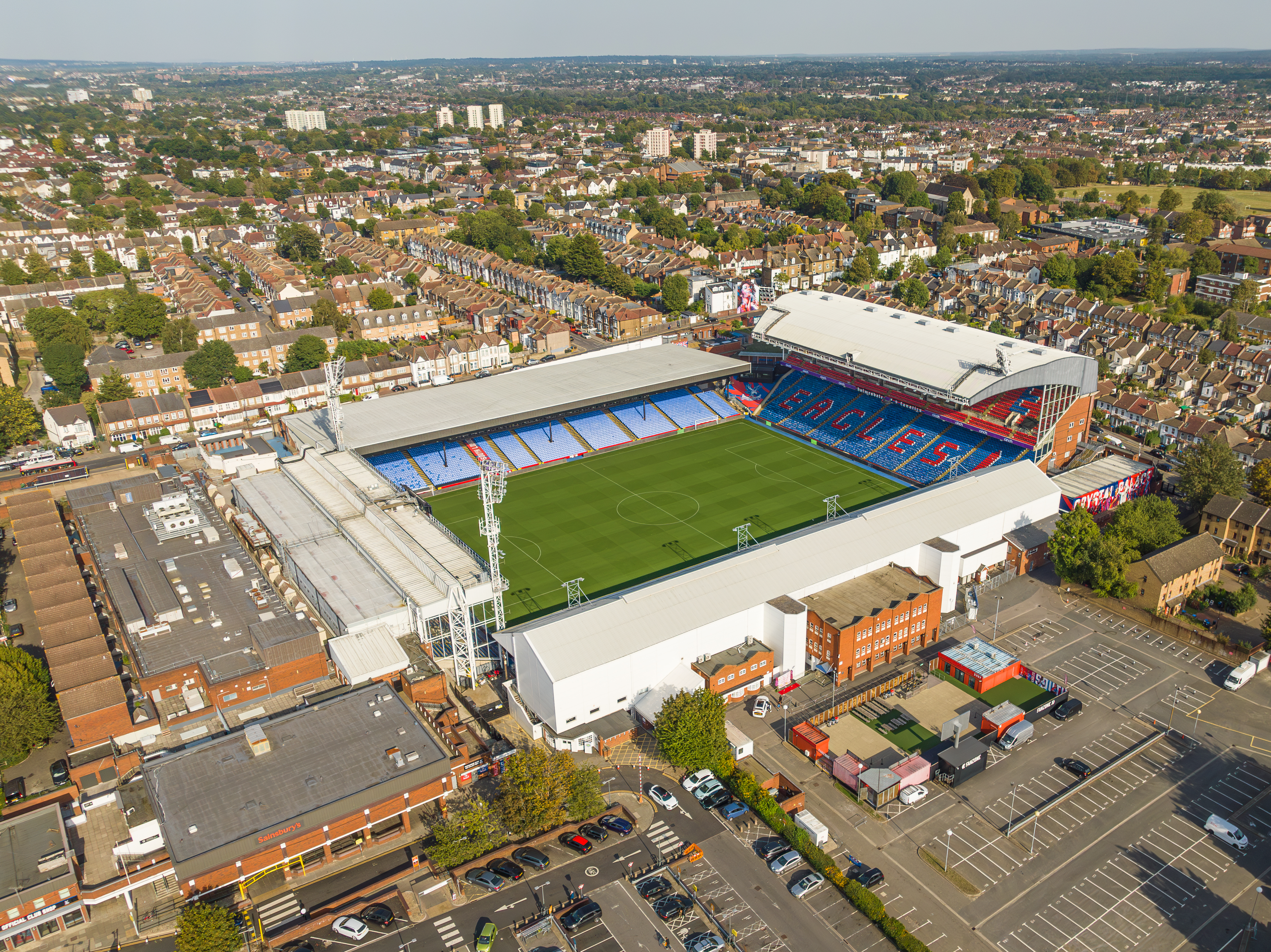
The Selhurst Park in London, the home of Crystal Palace.

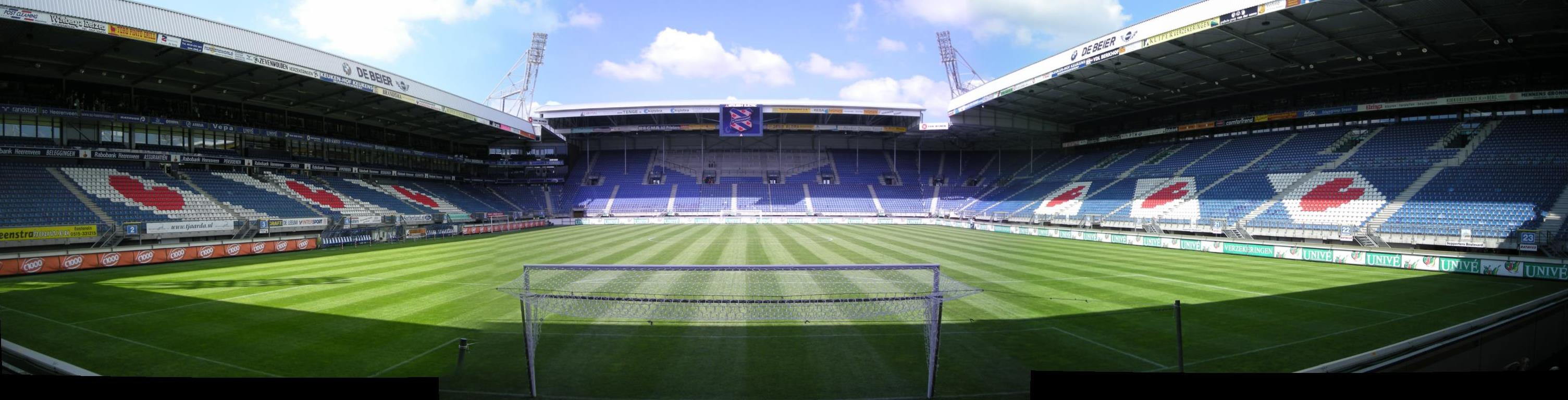
The Abe Lenstra Stadion in Heerenveen, the home of sc Heerenveen.

The Red Bull Arena in Harrison, the home of Red Bull New York.

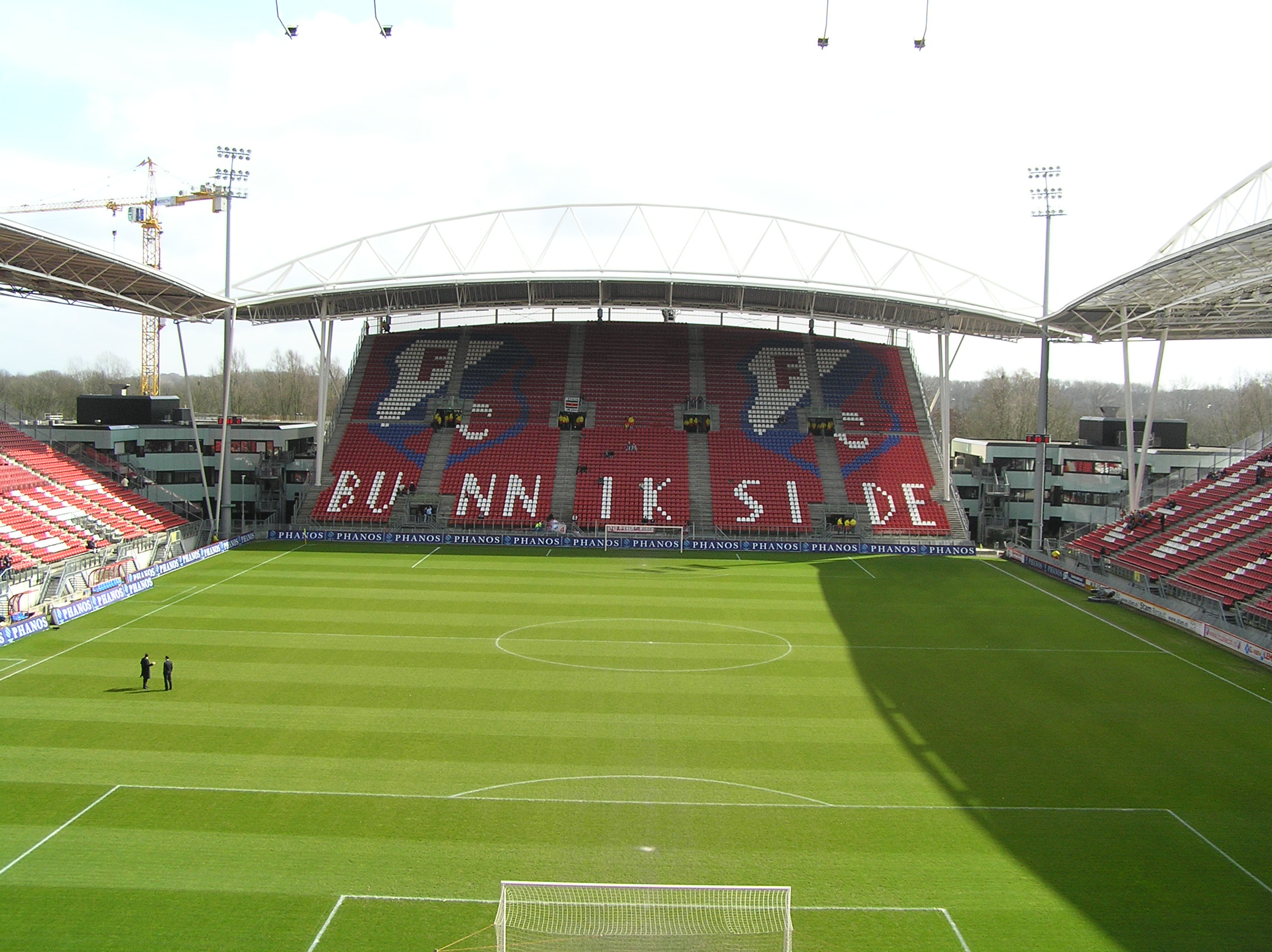
Stadion Galgenwaard in Utrecht, the home of FC Utrecht.

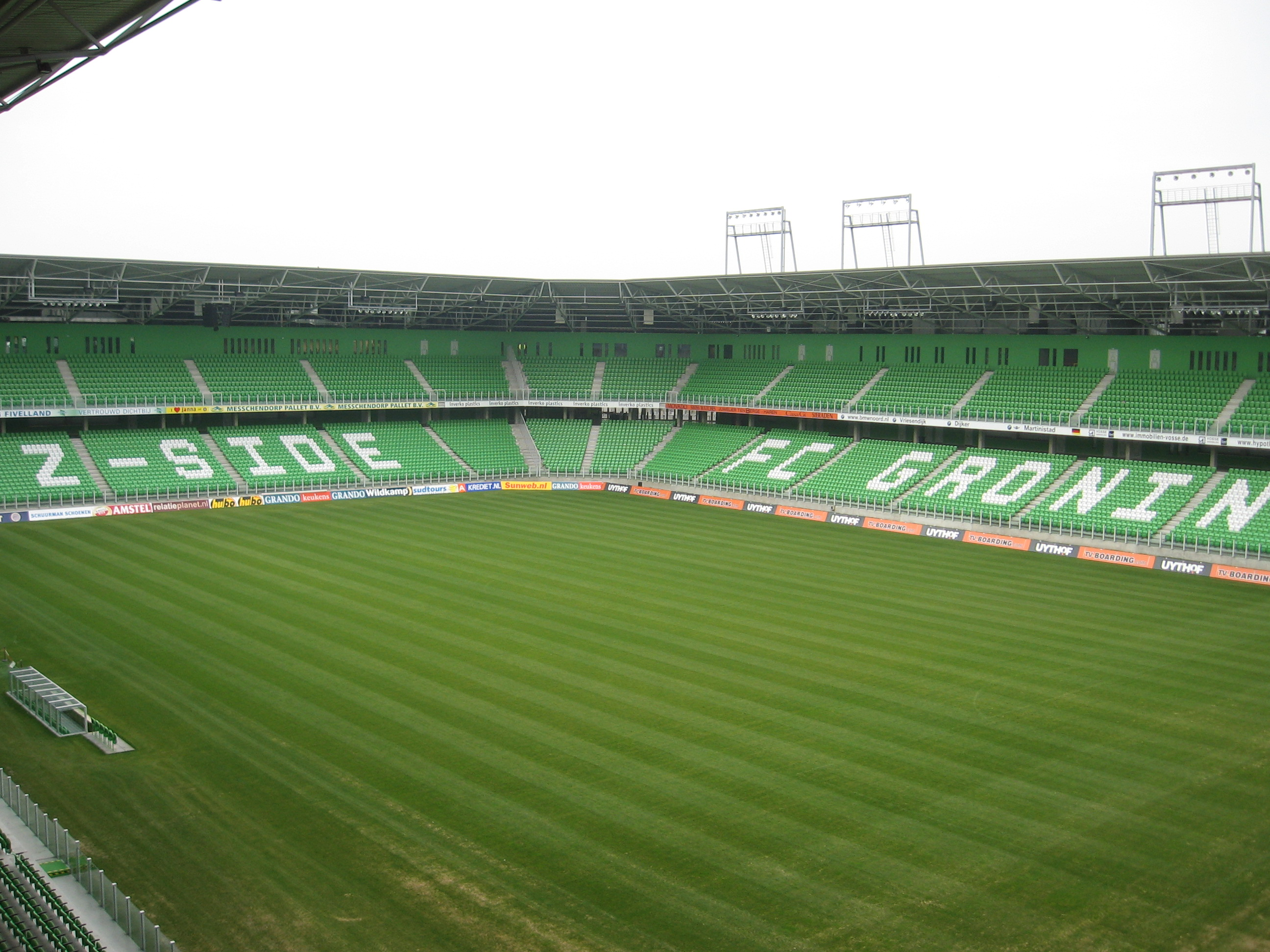
The Euroborg in Groningen, the home of FC Groningen.

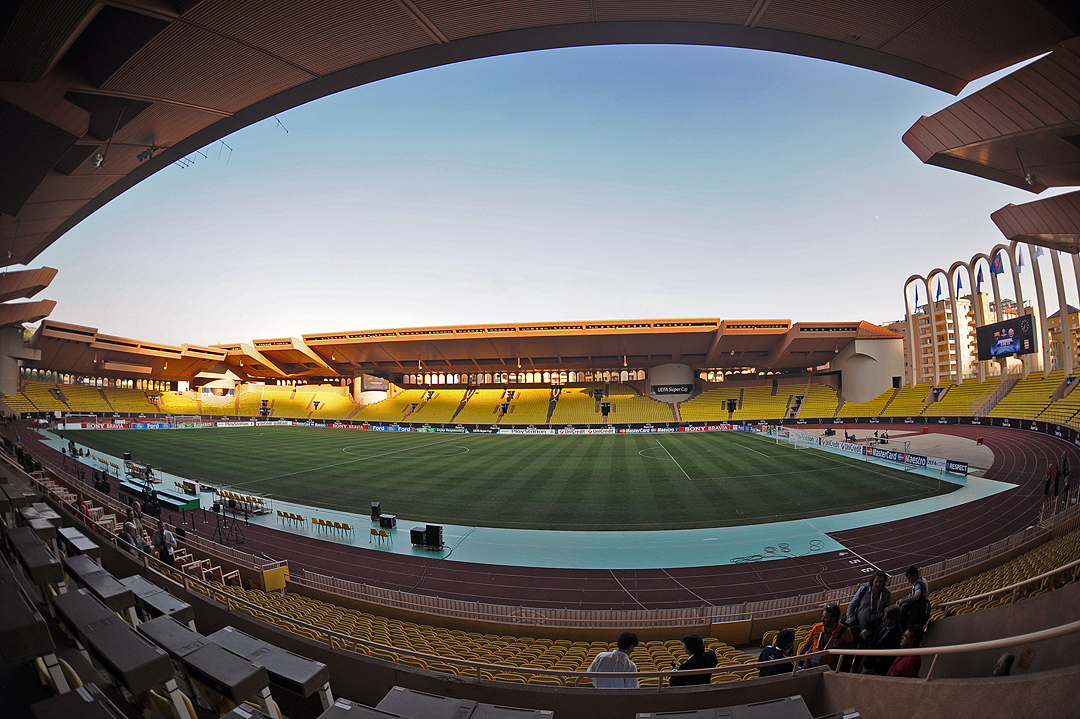
The Stade Louis II in Monaco, the home of AS Monaco.

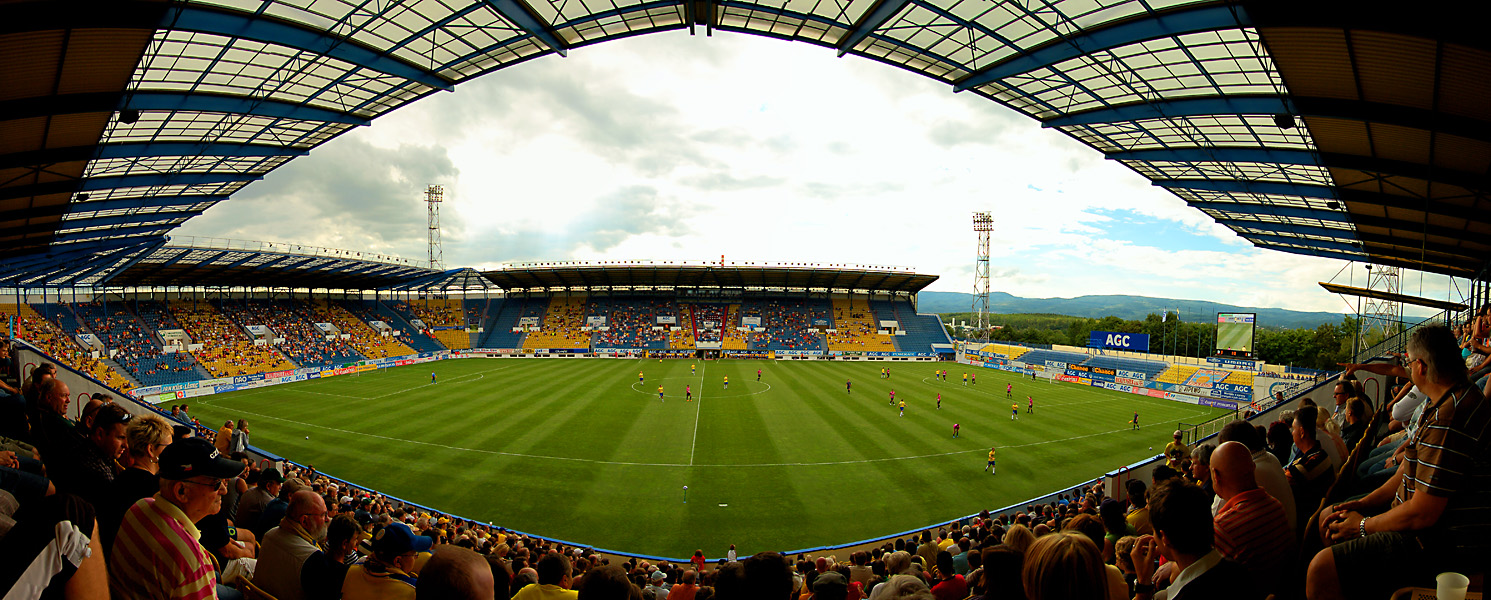
The AGC Aréna Na Stínadlech in Teplice, the home of FK Teplice.

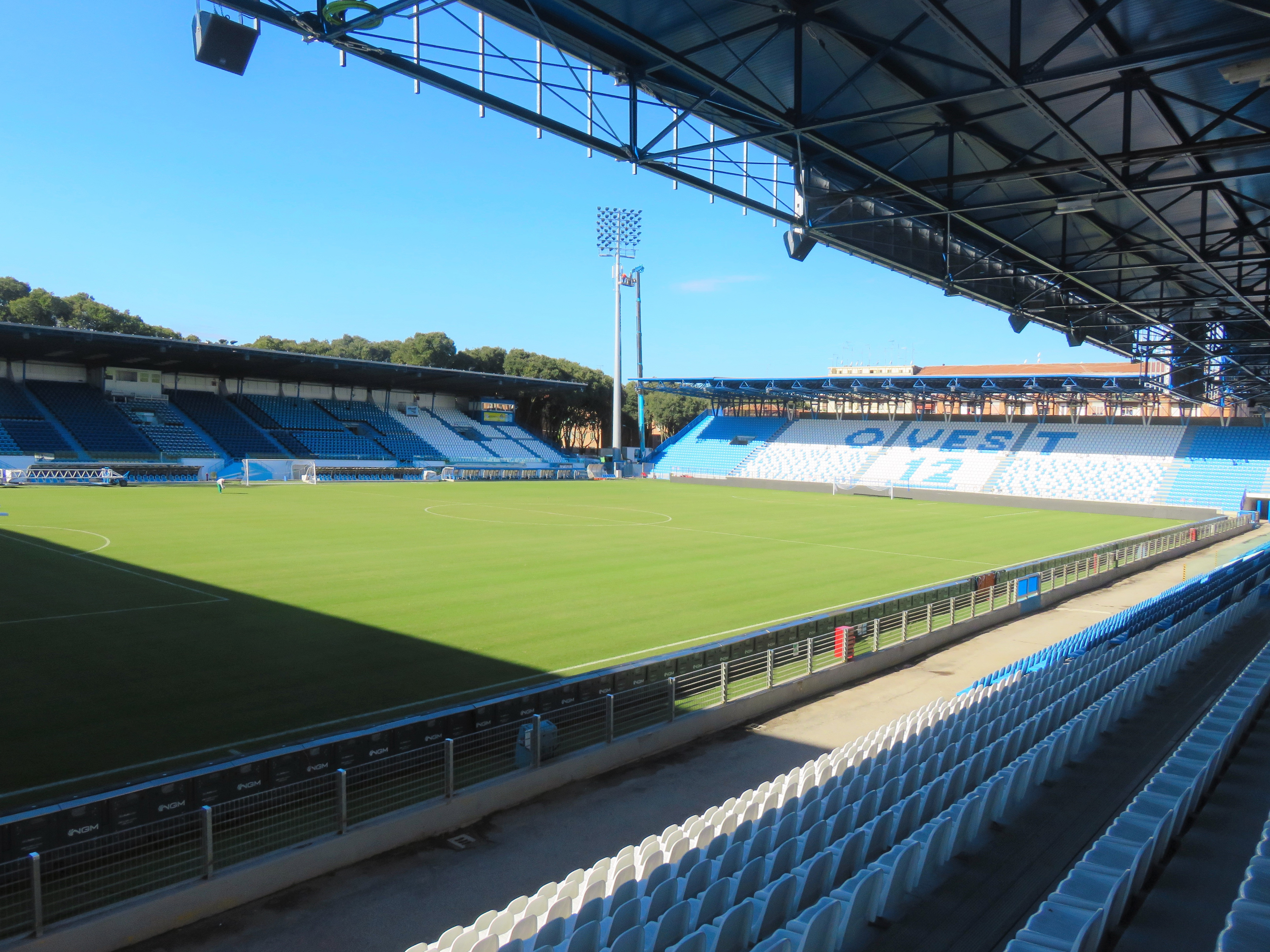
The Stadio Paolo Mazza in Ferrara, the home of SPAL.

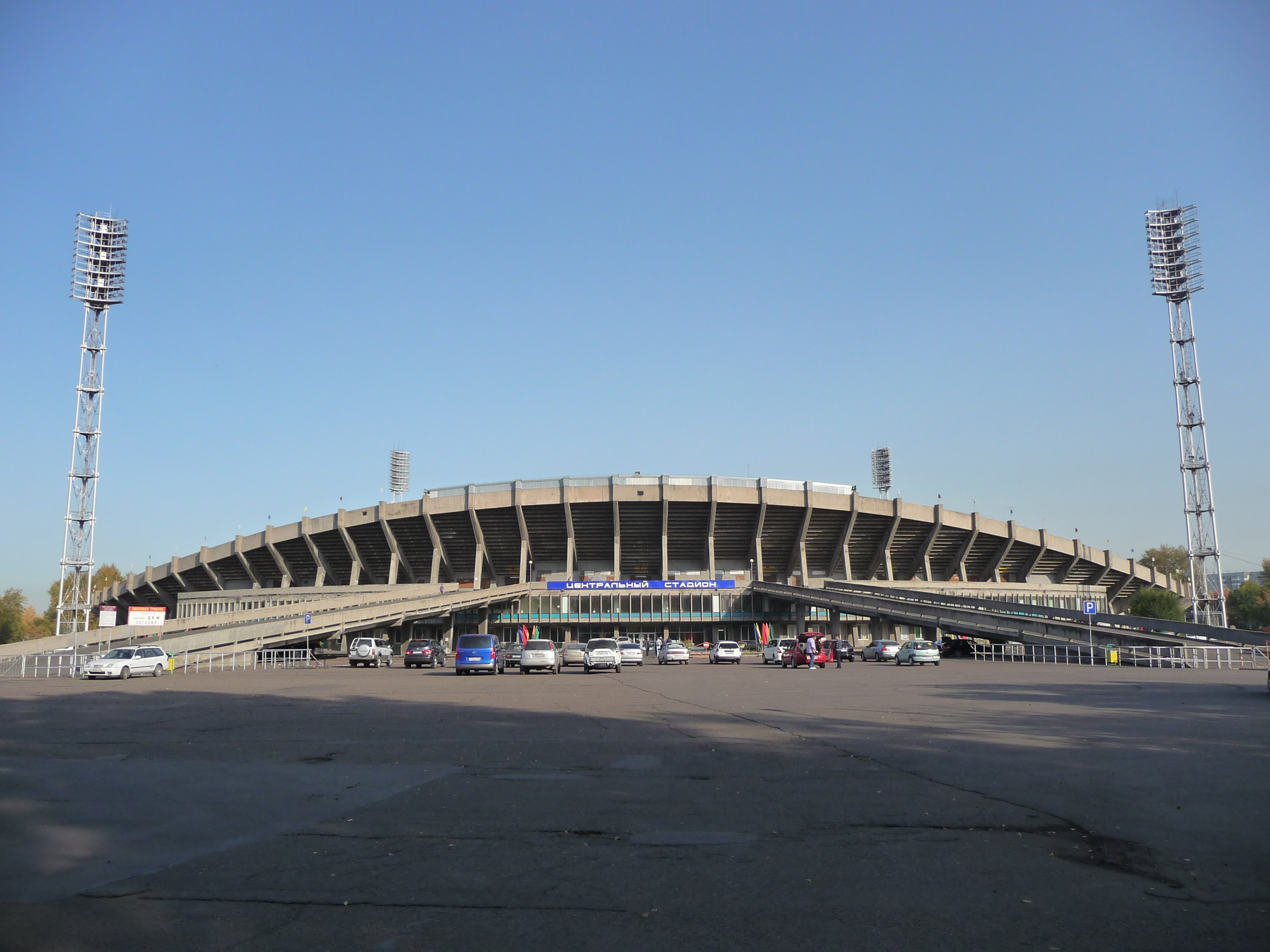
The Central Stadium in Krasnoyarsk, the home of FC Yenisey Krasnoyarsk.

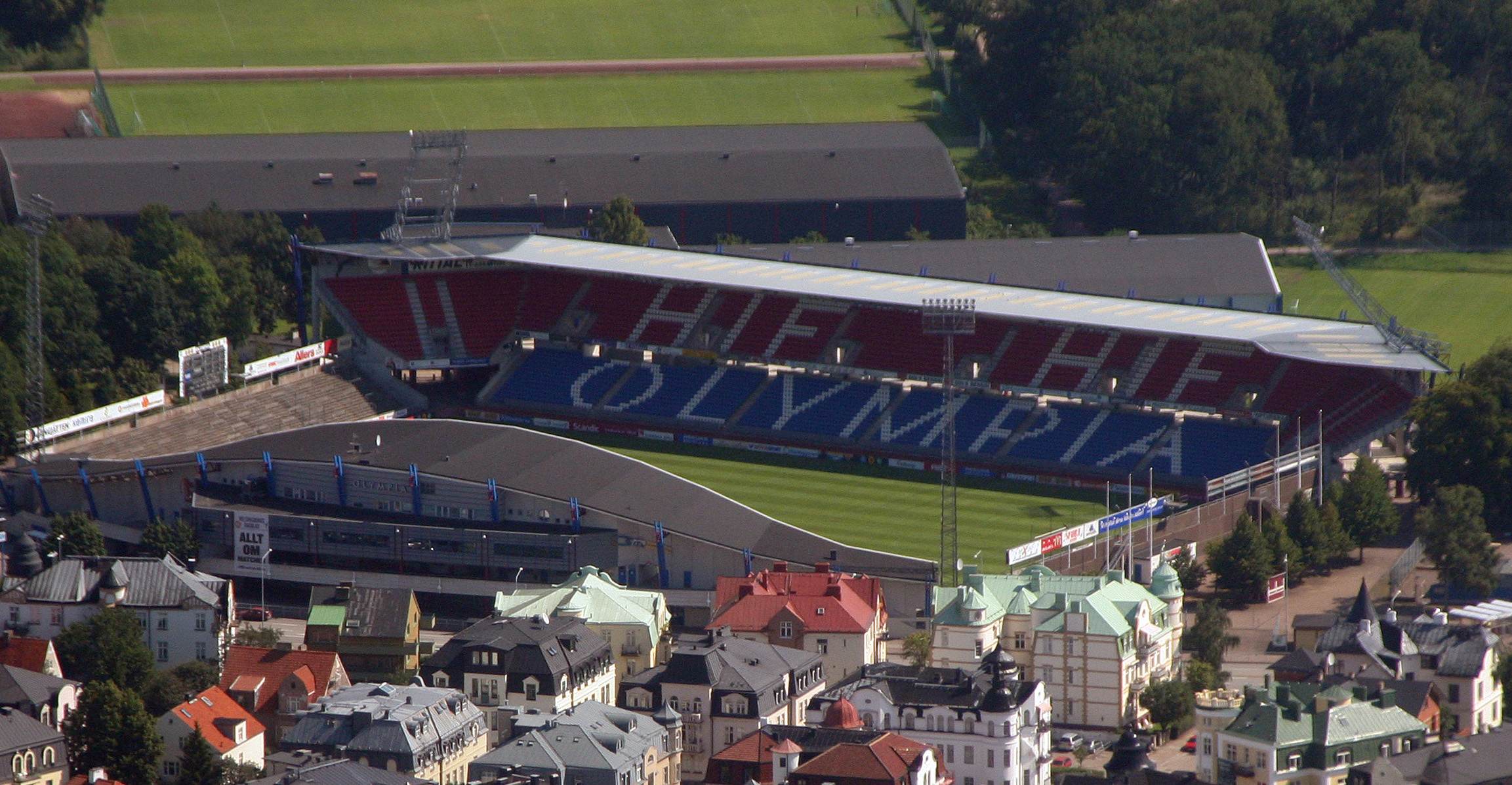
Olympia in Helsingborg, the home of Helsingborgs IF.

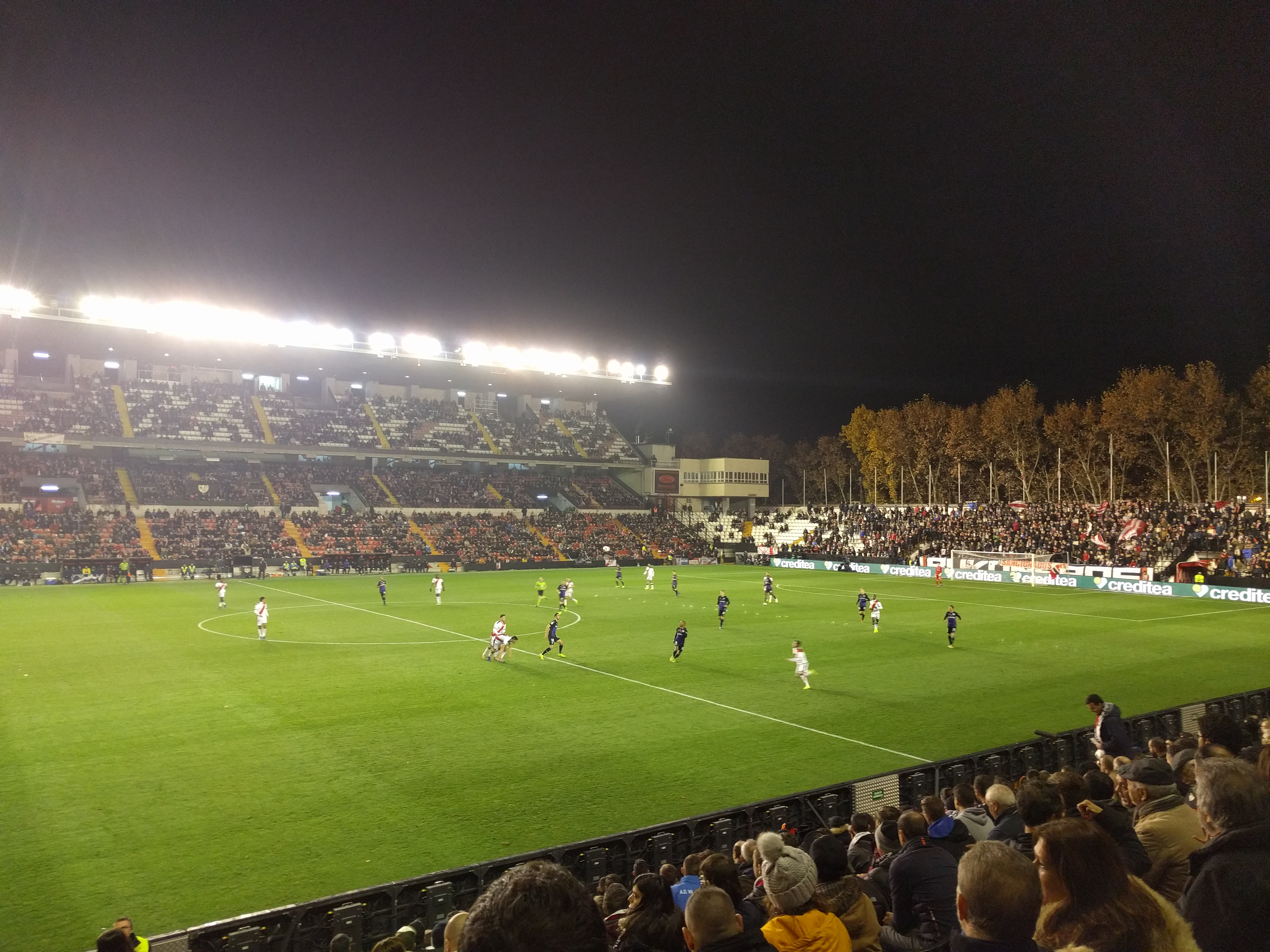
The Campo de Fútbol de Vallecas in Madrid, the home of Rayo Vallecano.

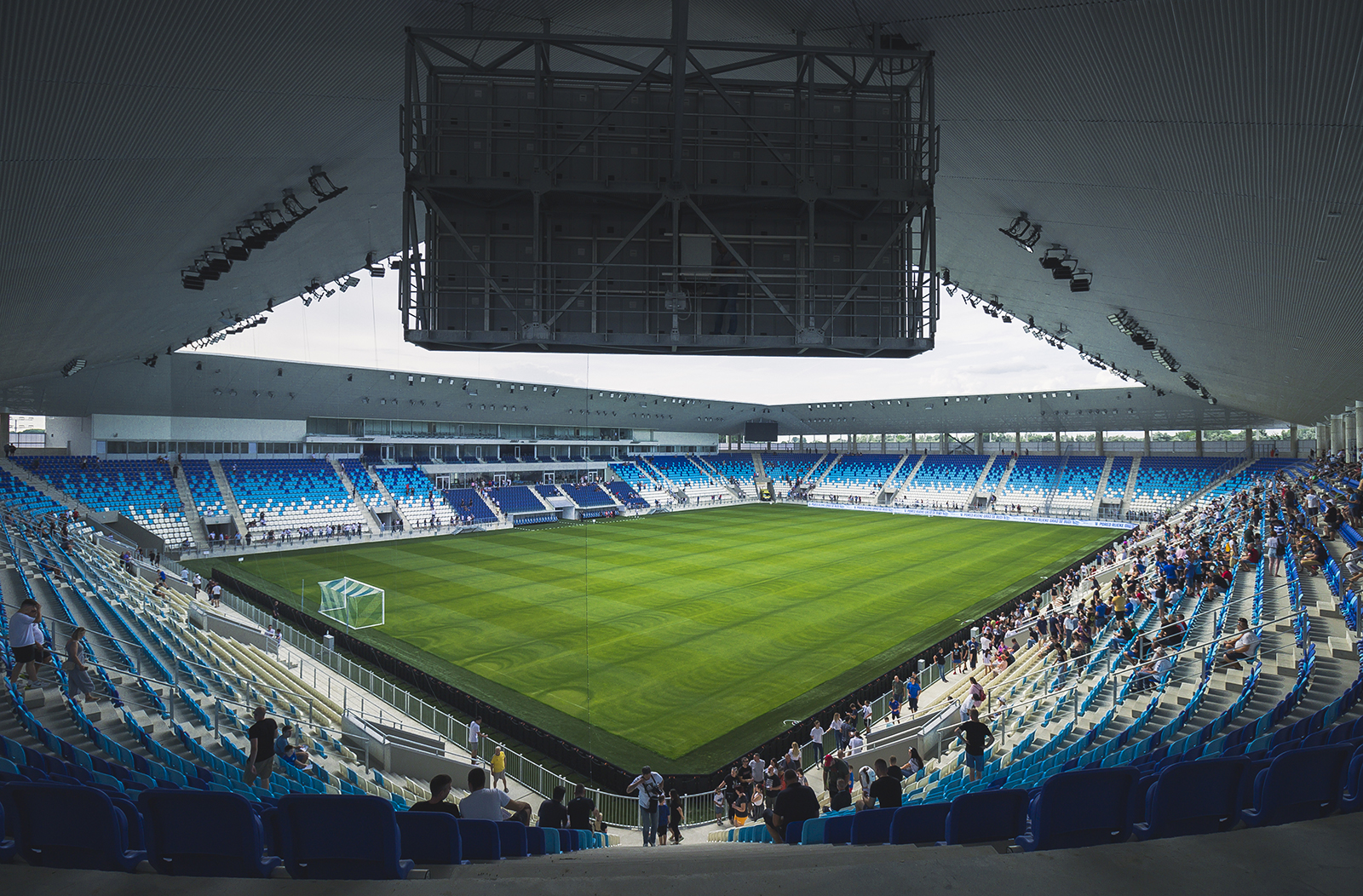
The Opus Arena in Osijek, the home of NK Osijek.

== Afghanistan ==
| Stadium | Capacity | City | Tenants |
|---|---|---|---|
| Ghazi Stadium | 25,000 | Kabul | Afghanistan national football team |
| Ahmad Shahi Stadium | 20,000 | Kandahar | |

== Albania ==
| Stadium | Capacity | Tenants |
|---|---|---|
| Arena Kombëtare | 22,500 | Albania national football team |
| Loro Boriçi Stadium | 17,500 | Vllaznia Shkodër, Albania national football team |
| Elbasan Arena | 15,000 | KF Elbasani, Albania national football team |
| Tomori Stadium | 14,500 | FK Tomori Berat |
| Flamurtari Stadium | 13,000 | Flamurtari Vlorë |
| Niko Dovana Stadium | 12,198 | KF Teuta Durrës |
| Abdurrahman Roza Haxhiu Stadium | 12,000 | KF Lushnja |
| Skënderbeu Stadium | 12,000 | KF Skënderbeu Korçë |
| Laçi Stadium | 11,000 | KF Laçi |

== Algeria ==
| Stadium | Capacity | City | Tenants |
|---|---|---|---|
| 5 July 1962 Stadium | 64,000 | Algiers | MC Alger & Algeria team |
| 19 May 1956 Stadium | 56,000 | Annaba | USM Annaba |
| Hocine Ait Ahmed Stadium | 50,766 | Tizi Ouzou | JS Kabylie |
| 24 February 1956 Stadium | 45,000 | Sidi Bel Abbes | USM Bel-Abbès |
| Nelson Mandela Stadium | 40,784 | Baraki, Algiers | Algeria National Team |
| Miloud Hadefi Stadium | 40,143 | Bir El Djir, Oran | MC Oran & Algeria Team |
| Ahmed Zabana Stadium | 40,000 | Oran | MC Oran & Algerian rugby union team |
| Hocine Rouibah Stadium | 35,000 | Jijel | JS Djijel |
| Ahmed Kaïd Stadium | 30,000 | Tiaret | JSM Tiaret |
| Tahar Zoughari Stadium | 30,000 | Relizane | RC Relizane |
| 18 February Stadium | 30,000 | Biskra | US Biskra |
| Mustapha Tchaker Stadium | 25,000 | Blida | USM Blida & Algeria team |
| 20 August 1955 Stadium | 25,000 | Skikda | JSM Skikda |
| Colonel Lotfi Stadium | 25,000 | Tlemcen | WA Tlemcen |
| Abdelhamid Bouteldja Stadium | 25,000 | Skikda | JSM Skikda |
| Messaoud Zougar Stadium | 25,000 | El Eulma | MC El Eulma |
| Saïd Amara Stadium | 25,000 | Saïda | MC Saïda |
| 8 May 1945 Stadium | 25,000 | Sétif | ES Sétif |
| Chahid Hamlaoui Stadium | 22,986 | Constantine | CS Constantine |
| The African Unity Stadium | 22,000 | Mascara | GC Mascara |
| 1 November 1954 Stadium | 20,000 | Batna | CA Batna & MSP Batna |
| Habib Bouakeul Stadium | 20,000 | Oran | ASM Oran & SCM Oran |
| Abdelkrim Kerroum Stadium | 20,000 | Sig | CC Sig |
| 20 August 1955 Stadium | 20,000 | Bordj Bou Arréridj | CA Bordj Bou Arreridj |
| Mohamed Boumezrag Stadium | 18,000 | Chlef | ASO Chlef |
| Mohamed Bensaïd Stadium | 18,000 | Mostaganem | ES Mostaganem & WA Mostaganem |
| Maghrebi Unity Stadium | 18,000 | Béjaïa | MO Béjaïa & JSM Béjaïa |
| 1 November 1954 Stadium | 18,000 | Tizi Ouzou | JS Kabylie |
| 13 February Stadium | 18,000 | Ouargla | AHM Hassi Messaoud |
| 4 March 1956 Stadium | 17,250 | Tébessa | US Tébessa |
| Omar Hamadi Stadium | 17,000 | Bologhine | USM Alger |
| 20 August 1955 Stadium | 15,000 | Béchar | JS Saoura |
| Imam Lyes Stadium | 15,000 | Médéa | Olympique de Médéa |
| Boudjemaa Souidani Stadium | 15,000 | Guelma | ES Guelma |
| Mokhtar Badji Stadium | 15,000 | Souk Ahras | ES Souk Ahras |
| Rabah Bitat Stadium | 15,000 | Bouira | MB Bouira |
| Zakaria Medjdoub Stadium | 15,000 | El Bayadh | MC El Bayadh |
| Omar Benrabah Stadium | 14,150 | Dar El Beïda | Paradou AC, CRB Dar el-Beïda |
| Ramadane Ben Abdelmalek Stadium | 13,000 | Constantine | MO Constantine |
| 20 August 1955 Stadium | 12,000 | Algiers | CR Belouizdad |
| Salem Mabrouki Stadium | 12,000 | Rouïba | WO Rouïba |
| Omar Oucief Stadium | 11,500 | Aïn Témouchent | CR Témouchent |
| Brakni Brothers Stadium | 10,000 | Blida | USM Blida |
| 5 July Stadium | 10,000 | Hadjout | USMM Hadjout |
| Meflah Aoued Stadium | 10,000 | Mascara | OR Mascara |
| Colonel Abdelkader Chabou Stadium | 10,000 | Annaba | Hamra Annaba |
| Lahouari Benahmed Stadium | 10,000 | Oran | RCG Oran |
| Abderrahmene Bensaci Stadium | 10,000 | Merouana | AB Merouana |
| Demane-Debbih Brothers Stadium | 10,000 | Aïn M'lila | AS Aïn M'lila |
| 1 November 1954 Stadium | 10,000 | Algiers | USM El Harrach |
| Mohamed Benhaddad Stadium | 10,000 | Kouba | RC Kouba |
| Koléa Olympic Stadium | 10,000 | Koléa | – |
| 11 December 1961 Stadium | 10,000 | Chelghoum Laïd | HB Chelghoum Laïd |

== Angola ==
| Stadium | Capacity | City | Tenants |
|---|---|---|---|
| Estádio 11 de Novembro | 48,500 | Viana | Primeiro de Agosto, Petro de Luanda; Angola national team |
| Estádio da Cidadela | 40,000 | Luanda | ASA, Progresso do Sambizanga |
| Estádio Nacional de Ombaka | 35,000 | Benguela | Nacional Benguela, Angola national team |
| Estádio Nacional da Tundavala | 20,000 | Lubango | N/A |
| Estádio Nacional do Chiazi | 20,000 | Cabinda | N/A |
| Estádio do Santos | 17,000 | Viana | Santos Futebol Clube |
| Campo Mário Santiago | 16,000 | Luanda | Progresso do Sambizanga |
| Estádio do Ferroviário da Huíla | 15,000 | Lubango | Desportivo da Huíla |
| Estádio dos Coqueiros | 12,000 | Luanda | Kabuscorp |
| Estádio Nossa Senhora do Monte | 12,000 | Lubango | Clube Desportivo da Huila |

== Argentina ==
| Stadium | Capac. | City | Province | Tenants | Open. | Ref. |
|---|---|---|---|---|---|---|
| Más Monumental | 84,567 | Buenos Aires | (autonomous city) | River Plate (Note: Also hosted matches of the Argentina national team.) | 1938 | |
| La Bombonera | 57,200 | Buenos Aires | (autonomous city) | Boca Juniors | 1940 | |
| Estadio Mario Alberto Kempes | 57,000 | Córdoba | Córdoba | Belgrano (C) / Instituto / Racing (C) / Talleres (C) | 1978 | |
| El Cilindro | 55,880 | Avellaneda | Buenos Aires | Racing | 1950 | |
| Estadio Único Diego Armando Maradona | 53,000 | La Plata | Buenos Aires | Estudiantes (LP) / Gimnasia y Esgrima (LP) (Note: Also hosted matches of the Argentina national rugby team.) | 2003 | |
| Estadio José Amalfitani | 49,540 | Buenos Aires | (autonomous city) | Vélez Sársfield | 1951 | |
| Estadio Tomás Adolfo Ducó | 48,314 | Buenos Aires | (autonomous city) | Huracán | 1949 | |
| Estadio Pedro Bidegain | 47,964 | Buenos Aires | (autonomous city) | San Lorenzo | 1993 | |
| Estadio Ciudad de Lanús – Néstor Díaz Pérez | 47,090 | Lanús | Buenos Aires | CA Lanús | 1929 | |
| Estadio Libertadores de América | 42,069 | Avellaneda | Buenos Aires | Independiente | 1928 | |
| Estadio Malvinas Argentinas | 42,000 | Mendoza | Mendoza | Godoy Cruz, Independiente Rivadavia, Huracán (LH), San Martín (M) | 1978 | |
| Estadio Gigante de Arroyito | 41,465 | Rosario | Santa Fe | Rosario Central | 1926 | |
| Estadio Marcelo Bielsa | 38,095 | Rosario | Santa Fe | Newell's Old Boys | 1911 | |
| Estadio Monumental José Fierro | 35,200 | San Miguel de Tucumán | Tucumán | Atlético Tucumán | 1922 | |
| Estadio José María Minella | 35,180 | Mar del Plata | Buenos Aires | Aldosivi / Alvarado | 1978 | |
| Estadio Eduardo Gallardón | 35,000 | Lomas de Zamora | Buenos Aires | Los Andes | 1940 | |
| Estadio Florencio Sola | 34,900 | Banfield | Buenos Aires | CA Banfield | 1940 | |
| Estadio Jorge Luis Hirschi | 32,530 | La Plata | Buenos Aires | Estudiantes (LP) | 1907 | |
| Estadio Nueva España | 32,500 | Buenos Aires | (autonomous city) | Deportivo Español | 1981 | |
| Estadio Nuevo Francisco Urbano | 32,000 | Morón | Buenos Aires | Deportivo Morón | 2013 | |
| Estadio Juan Carmelo Zerillo | 30,973 | La Plata | Buenos Aires | Gimnasia y Esgrima (LP) | 1924 | |
| Estadio Brigadier General Estanislao López | 30,835 | Santa Fe | Santa Fe | C.A. Colón | 1946 | |
| El Gigante de Alberdi | 30,500 | Córdoba | Córdoba | Belgrano (C) | 1929 | |
| Estadio La Ciudadela | 30,250 | San Miguel de Tucumán | Tucumán | San Martín (Tucumán) | 1932 | |
| Estadio Centenario Ciudad de Quilmes | 30,200 | Quilmes | Buenos Aires | Quilmes AC | 1995 | |
| Estadio Único Madre de Ciudades | 30,000 | Santiago del Estero | Santiago del Estero | Central Córdoba / C.A. Mitre | 2020 | |
| Estadio Ciudad de Vicente López | 28,530 | Vicente López | Buenos Aires | Platense | 1979 | |
| Estadio Único de Villa Mercedes | 28,000 | Villa Mercedes | San Luis | (Note: Operated by Liga Mercedina de Fútbol, the regional football league of Villa Mercedes.) | 2017 | |
| Estadio José Dellagiovanna | 26,282 | Victoria | Buenos Aires | Tigre | 1936 | |
| Estadio 15 de Abril | 26,000 | Santa Fe | Santa Fe | Unión (SF) | 1929 | |
| Estadio Alfredo Beranger | 26,000 | Temperley | Buenos Aires | Temperley | 1924 | |
| Estadio Juan Domingo Perón | 26,000 | Córdoba | Córdoba | Instituto | 1951 | |
| Estadio Diego Armando Maradona | 26,000 | Buenos Aires | (autonomous city) | Argentinos Juniors | 2003 | |
| Estadio San Juan del Bicentenario | 25,000 | San Juan | San Juan | San Martín (SJ) / Desamparados | 2011 | |
| Estadio Centenario | 25,000 | Resistencia | Chaco | Sarmiento | 2011 | |
| Estadio Único de San Nicolás | 25,000 | San Nicolás | Buenos Aires | (various) (Note: Operated by Liga Nicoleña de Fútbol, the regional football league of San Nicolás Partido.) | 2019 | |
| Estadio Fragata Presidente Sarmiento | 25,000 | Isidro Casanova | Buenos Aires | Almirante Brown | 1969 | |
| Estadio Arquitecto Ricardo Etcheverri | 24,442 | Buenos Aires | (autonomous city) | Ferro Carril Oeste | 1905 | |
| Estadio Chacarita Juniors | 24,300 | Villa Maipú | Buenos Aires | Chacarita Juniors | 1945 | |
| Estadio El Gigante del Norte | 24,300 | Salta | Salta | Gimnasia y Tiro | 1993 | |
| Estadio 23 de Agosto | 23,200 | San Salvador de Jujuy | Jujuy | Gimnasia y Esgrima (J) | 1973 | |
| Estadio Eva Perón | 22,000 | Junín | Buenos Aires | Sarmiento (J) | 1951 | |
| Estadio Islas Malvinas | 21,500 | Buenos Aires | (autonomous city) | All Boys | 1963 | |
| Estadio Padre Ernesto Martearena | 21,000 | Salta | Salta | Central Norte / Juventud Antoniana | 2001 | |
| Estadio Alfredo Terrera | 20,000 | Santiago del Estero | Santiago del Estero | Central Córdoba (SdE) | 1946 | |
| Estadio Nueva Chicago | 20,000 (Note: Information about the real capacity varies according to sources. The average sets between 24,000 and 29,000 but the preferred is 20,000 per security reasons.) | Buenos Aires | (autonomous city) | Nueva Chicago | 1940 | |
| Estadio Norberto "Tito" Tomaghello | 20,000 | Florencio Varela | Buenos Aires | Defensa y Justicia | 1978 | |
| Estadio Julio Humberto Grondona | 18,500 | Sarandí | Buenos Aires | Arsenal | 1964 | |
| Estadio Roberto Natalio Carminatti | 18,000 | Bahía Blanca | Buenos Aires | Olimpo | 1942 | |
| Estadio Don León Kolbowski | 18,000 | Buenos Aires | (autonomous city) | Atlanta | 1960 | |
| Estadio El Serpentario | 18,000 | San Juan | San Juan | Sportivo Desamparados | 1960 | |
| Alvaro Pedro Ducás | 16,500 | Neuquén | Neuquén Province | Alianza de Cutral Có | 1963 | |
| Estadio Ciudad de Caseros | 16,000 | Caseros | Buenos Aires | Estudiantes (BA) | 1963 | |
| Estadio Miguel Sancho | 15,000 | Córdoba | Córdoba | Racing (C) | 1948 | |
| Estadio José Antonio Romero Feris | 15,000 | Corrientes | Corrientes | Huracán Corrientes | 1986 | |
| Estadio Raúl Conti | 15,000 | Puerto Madryn | Chubut | Guillermo Brown | 1967 | |
| Estadio Feliciano Gambarte | 11,000 (Note: Remodelation in progress, expected to be opened in June 2024.) | Mendoza | Mendoza | Godoy Cruz | 1959 | |
| Estadio Presbítero Bartolomé Grella | 14,000 | Paraná | Entre Ríos | Patronato | 1956 | |
| Estadio La Boutique | 13,000 | Córdoba | Córdoba | Talleres (C) | 1931 | |
| Estadio Almagro | 13,000 | José Ingenieros | Buenos Aires | Almagro | 1956 | |
| Estadio Víctor Legrotaglie | 11,000 | Mendoza | Mendoza | Gimnasia y Esgrima (M) | 1934 | |
| Estadio Gabino Sosa | 10,000 | Rosario | Santa Fe | Central Córdoba (R) | 1907 | |
| Estadio Comandante Andrés Guacurarí | 10,000 | Garupá | Misiones | Crucero del Norte | 2003 | |

== Armenia ==
| Stadium | Capacity | City | Tenants | Opened |
|---|---|---|---|---|
| Hrazdan Stadium | 54,208 | Yerevan | none | 1970 |
| Vazgen Sargsyan Republican Stadium | 14,403 | Yerevan | Armenia, Ararat Yerevan | 1935 |

== Australia ==
| Stadium | Capacity | City | Tenants |
|---|---|---|---|
| Melbourne Cricket Ground | 100,024 | Melbourne | |
| Stadium Australia | 83,500 | Sydney | |
| Docklands Stadium | 56,347 | Melbourne | |
| Adelaide Oval | 53,500 | Adelaide | |
| Lang Park | 52,500 | Brisbane | Brisbane Roar |
| Queensland Sport and Athletics Centre | 48,500 | Brisbane | |
| Sydney Cricket Ground | 48,000 | Sydney | |
| Sydney Football Stadium | 42,500 | Sydney | Sydney FC |
| The Gabba | 42,500 | Brisbane | |
| Kardinia Park | 36,000 | Geelong | |
| Melbourne Rectangular Stadium | 30,000 | Melbourne | Melbourne City; Melbourne Victory |
| Newcastle International Sports Centre | 30,000 | Newcastle | Newcastle Jets |
| Western Sydney Stadium | 30,000 | Sydney | Western Sydney Wanderers |
| North Queensland Stadium | 25,455 | Townsville | |
| Canberra Stadium | 25,000 | Canberra | |
| Penrith Stadium | 22,500 | Penrith | |
| Wollongong Showground | 22,000 | Wollongong | Wollongong Wolves |
| Perth Rectangular Stadium | 20,500 | Perth | Perth Glory |
| Central Coast Stadium | 20,059 | Gosford | Central Coast Mariners |
| Jubilee Oval | 20,000 | Sydney | |
| Leichhardt Oval | 20,000 | Sydney | Sydney FC Women |
| WACA Ground | 20,000 | Perth | |
| Campbelltown Stadium | 17,500 | Sydney | Macarthur FC |
| Belmore Sports Ground | 17,000 | Sydney | Sydney Olympic |
| Hindmarsh Stadium | 16,500 | Adelaide | Adelaide United |
| Manuka Oval | 16,000 | Canberra | |
| Knights Stadium | 15,000 | Melbourne | Melbourne Knights |
| Norwood Oval | 15,000 | Adelaide | |
| Carrington Park | 13,000 | Bathurst | |
| Lakeside Stadium | 12,000 | Melbourne | South Melbourne |
| Latrobe City Stadium | 12,000 | Morwell | Falcons 2000 |
| Lavington Sports Ground | 12,000 | Albury | |
| Olympic Village | 12,000 | Melbourne | Heidelberg United |
| St George Stadium | 12,000 | Sydney | St George |
| Coffs Harbour International Stadium | 10,000 | Coffs Harbour | |
| Epping Stadium | 10,000 | Melbourne | Brunswick Juventus |
| Green Gully Reserve | 10,000 | Melbourne | Green Gully |
| Melita Stadium | 10,000 | Sydney | Parramatta |
| Newcastle Number 1 Sports Ground | 10,000 | Newcastle | |
| North Sydney Oval | 10,000 | Sydney | |
| Queen Elizabeth Oval | 10,000 | Bendigo | |
| Sunshine Coast Stadium | 10,000 | Brisbane | |
| Sydney United Sports Centre | 10,000 | Sydney | Sydney United 58 |

== Austria ==
| Stadium | Capacity | City | Tenants |
|---|---|---|---|
| Ernst Happel Stadion | 50,865 | Vienna | Austria national team |
| Hypo-Arena | 32,000 | Klagenfurt | SK Austria Klagenfurt |
| Red Bull Arena | 30,188 | Salzburg | Red Bull Salzburg |
| Allianz Stadion | 30,000 | Vienna | SK Rapid Wien |
| Raiffeisen Arena | 19,080 | Linz | LASK |
| Generali Arena | 17,656 | Vienna | FK Austria Wien |
| Tivoli Neu | 17,400 | Innsbruck | FC Wacker Tirol |
| Pappelstadion | 15,700 | Mattersburg | SV Mattersburg |
| UPC-Arena | 15,312 | Graz | SK Sturm Graz |
| Bundesstadion Südstadt | 12,000 | Maria Enzersdorf | VfB Admira Wacker Mödling |
| Sepp-Doll-Stadion | 10,000 | Krems | Kremser SC |

== Azerbaijan ==
| Stadium | Capacity | Tenants |
|---|---|---|
| Baku National Stadium | 69,870 | Azerbaijan |
| Tofiq Bahramov Stadium | 31,200 | |
| Ganja City Stadium | 27,000 | Kapaz PFC |
| M. Huseynzade Stadium | 16,000 | FC Sumqayit |
| Lankaran City Stadium | 15,000 | FC Khazar Lankaran |
| Nakhchivan City Stadium | 12,800 | Araz-Naxçıvan PFC |
| Bakcell Arena | 11,000 | Neftçi PFC |
| Barda Stadium | 10,000 | ABN Barda |

== Bahamas ==
| Stadium | Capacity | Country | Tenants |
|---|---|---|---|
| Thomas Robinson Stadium | 15,023 | Bahamas | Bears FC |

== Bahrain ==
| Stadium | Capacity | Tenants |
|---|---|---|
| Bahrain National Stadium | 24,000 | Bahrain |

== Bangladesh ==
| Stadium | Capacity | Tenants |
|---|---|---|
| MA Aziz Stadium | 40,000 | Chittagong Abahani, Chittagong Mohammedan |
| Bangabandhu National Stadium | 36,000 | Bangladesh, Dhaka Mohammedan, Dhaka Abahani, Sheikh Jamal, Sheikh Russel |
| Bir Shrestha Mostafa Kamal Stadium | 30,000 | Arambagh KS, Farashganj SC, Rahmatganj MFS |
| Rafiq Uddin Bhuiyan Stadium | 25,000 | AFC Uttara, Police Football Club |
| Habiganj Adhunik Stadium | 25,000 | |
| Rangpur Stadium | 25,000 | |
| Bangladesh Army Stadium | 20,000 | Bangladesh Army |
| Sylhet District Stadium | 16,000 | Beanibazar SC |
| Shamsul Huda Stadium | 12,000 | Bangladesh |

== Belarus ==
| # | Stadium | Capacity | City | Tenants |
|---|---|---|---|---|
| 1 | New National Stadium | 33,000 | Minsk | Belarus national football team |
| 2 | Dinamo Stadium | 22,246 | Minsk | Belarus national football team and Dynama Minsk |
| 3 | Traktor Stadium | 17,600 | Minsk | Isloch and FC Minsk |
| 4 | Central Stadium | 14,307 | Homieĺ | FC Gomel |
| 5 | Borisov Arena | 13,121 | Barysaŭ | BATE Borisov |
| 6 | Brestsky | 10,169 | Brest | Dynama Brest and Ruch Brest |

== Belgium ==
| Stadium | Capacity | City | Tenants |
|---|---|---|---|
| King Baudouin Stadium | 50,093 | Brussels | Belgium |
| Jan Breydel Stadium | 29,062 | Bruges | Club Brugge, Cercle Brugge |
| Stade Maurice Dufrasne | 27,670 | Liège | Standard Liège |
| Cegeka Arena | 23,718 | Genk | Racing Genk |
| Lotto Park | 22,500 | Anderlecht | Anderlecht |
| Planet Group Arena | 20,175 | Ghent | KAA Gent |
| Achter de Kazerne | 16,672 | Mechelen | KV Mechelen |
| Bosuilstadion | 16,144 | Antwerp | Royal Antwerp F.C. |
| Stade du Pays de Charleroi | 15,000 | Charleroi | R. Charleroi S.C. |
| Stayen | 14,600 | Sint-Truiden | STVV |
| Herman Vanderpoortenstadion | 14,538 | Lier | Lierse |
| Olympisch Stadion | 12,500 | Antwerp | Beerschot |
| Stade du Tivoli | 12,500 | La Louviere | RAAL La Louvière and UR La Louvière Centre |
| Elindus Arena | 12,414 | Waregem | S.V. Zulte Waregem |
| Edmond Machtens Stadium | 12,266 | Molenbeek | RWD Molenbeek |
| Daknamstadion | 12,136 | Lokeren | Sporting Lokeren |
| Stade de Buraufosse | 11,000 | Liège | RFC Tilleur |
| Stade Le Canonnier | 10,800 | Mouscron | Stade Mouscronnois |
| Den Dreef | 10,020 | Heverlee | OH Leuven |
| Forestiersstadion | 10,000 | Harelbeke | KRC Harelbeke |

== Benin ==
| Stadium | Capacity | City | Tenants |
|---|---|---|---|
| Stade de l'Amitié | 35,000 | Cotonou | Benin national football team |
| Stade Charles de Gaulle | 15,000 | Porto-Novo | AS Dragons FC de l'Ouémé |
| Stade René Pleven d'Akpakpa | 15,000 | Cotonou | Requins de l'Atlantique FC |

== Bhutan ==
| Stadium | Capacity | City | Tenants |
|---|---|---|---|
| Changlimithang Stadium | 15,000 | Thimphu | Bhutan national football team |

== Bolivia ==
| # | Stadium | Capacity | City | Tenants |
|---|---|---|---|---|
| 1 | Estadio Hernando Siles | 41,143 | La Paz | Bolivia, Club Bolivar, The Strongest |
| 2 | Estadio Ramón Tahuichi Aguilera | 38,000 | Santa Cruz de la Sierra | Oriente Petrolero, Club Blooming, Club Destroyers |
| 3 | Estadio Jesús Bermúdez | 33,795 | Oruro | Club San José |
| 4 | Estadio Víctor Agustín Ugarte | 32,105 | Potosí | Real Potosí, Nacional Potosí |
| 5 | Estadio Felix Capriles | 32,000 | Cochabamba | Club Jorge Wilstermann, Club Aurora |
| 6 | Estadio Olímpico Patria | 30,700 | Sucre | Club Universitario, Independiente Petrolero |
| 7 | Estadio Bicentenario de Villa Tunari | 25,000 | Villa Tunari | Palmaflor del Trópico |
| 8 | Estadio Ovidio Messa Soruco | 25,000 | Yacuiba | Club Petrolero |
| 9 | Estadio Roberto Jordán Cuéllar | 24,000 | Cobija | Universitario de Pando, Vaca Díez |
| 10 | Estadio Municipal de El Alto | 22,000 | El Alto | Club Always Ready |
| 11 | Estadio Edgar Peña Gutierrez | 17,000 | Santa Cruz | Sport Boys Warnes |
| 12 | Estadio IV Centenario | 15,000 | Tarija | Club Atlético Ciclón |
| 13 | Estadio Rafael Mendoza | 14,000 | La Paz | The Strongest |
| 14 | Estadio Gilberto Parada | 13,000 | Montero | Guabirá |
| 15 | Estadio Gran Mamoré | 12,000 | Trinidad | Municipal Real Mamoré |

== Bosnia and Herzegovina ==
| Stadium | Capacity | City | Tenants | Opened |
|---|---|---|---|---|
| Stadion Asim Ferhatović-Hase | 30,121 | Sarajevo | FK Sarajevo | 1947 |
| Stadion Grbavica | 18,057 | Sarajevo | FK Željezničar | 1953 |
| Stadion Bilino Polje | 15,292 | Zenica | NK Čelik | 1972 |
| Banja Luka City Stadium | 10,030 | Banja Luka | FK Borac | 1937 |

== Botswana ==
| Stadium | Capacity | Tenants |
|---|---|---|
| Francistown Stadium | 27,000 | ECCO City Green, TAFIC F.C., and TASC FC |
| Botswana National Stadium | 22,500 | Gaborone United, Notwane F.C., Police XI, Township Rollers F.C., and Botswana |
| Lobatse Stadium | 20,000 | Extension Gunners, Botswana Meat Commission F.C. |
| Molepolole Stadium | 15,000 | Mogoditshane Fighters |
| Maun Stadium | 10,000 | |
| Mochudi Stadium | 10,000 | |

== Brazil ==
| Stadium | Capacity | City | State | Tenants |
|---|---|---|---|---|
| Maracanã | 73,193 | Rio de Janeiro | Rio de Janeiro | Flamengo, Fluminense |
| Mané Garrincha | 69,910 | Brasília | Federal District | Brasília FC |
| Mineirão | 66,658 | Belo Horizonte | Minas Gerais | Cruzeiro |
| Morumbi | 66,435 | São Paulo | São Paulo | São Paulo FC |
| Arruda | 60,044 | Recife | Pernambuco | Santa Cruz |
| Arena Castelão | 57,876 | Fortaleza | Ceará | Ceará, Fortaleza EC |
| Arena do Grêmio | 55,662 | Porto Alegre | Rio Grande do Sul | Grêmio |
| Mangueirão | 53,635 | Belém | Pará | Paysandu, Clube do Remo |
| Beira-Rio | 49,055 | Porto Alegre | Rio Grande do Sul | Internacional |
| Casa de Apostas Arena Fonte Nova | 47,915 | Salvador | Bahia | EC Bahia |
| Arena MRV | 47,465 | Belo Horizonte | Minas Gerais | Atlético Mineiro |
| Arena Corinthians | 47,252 | São Paulo | São Paulo | Corinthians |
| Prudentão | 45,954 | Presidente Prudente | São Paulo | Grêmio Prudente |
| Arena Pernambuco | 45,440 | São Lourenço da Mata | Pernambuco | Retrô |
| Nilton Santos | 45,000 | Rio de Janeiro | Rio de Janeiro | Botafogo |
| Albertão | 44,200 | Teresina | Piauí | Flamengo-PI, River Atlético Clube |
| Allianz Parque | 43,713 | São Paulo | São Paulo | Palmeiras |
| Arena da Amazônia | 42,924 | Manaus | Amazonas | Amazonas, Manaus FC, Nacional |
| Arena Pantanal | 42,788 | Cuiabá | Mato Grosso | Cuiabá EC, Mixto |
| Arena da Baixada | 42,372 | Curitiba | Paraná | Athletico Paranaense |
| Serra Dourada | 42,000 | Goiânia | Goiás | Vila nova |
| Couto Pereira | 40,502 | Curitiba | Paraná | Coritiba FC |
| Pacaembu | 40,199 | São Paulo | São Paulo | |
| Castelão | 40,149 | São Luís | Maranhão | Sampaio Corrêa |
| Parque do Sabiá | 39,990 | Uberlândia | Minas Gerais | Uberlândia EC |
| Barradão | 35,000 | Salvador | Bahia | Vitória EC |
| Mário Helênio | 33,000 | Juiz de Fora | Minas Gerais | Tupi FC |
| Ilha do Retiro | 32,983 | Recife | Pernambuco | Sport |
| Teixeirão | 32,936 | São José do Rio Preto | São Paulo | América Futebol Clube |
| Pituaçu | 32,157 | Salvador | Bahia | Galícia |
| Arena das Dunas | 32,050 | Natal | Rio Grande do Norte | América Futebol Clube |
| Brinco de Ouro | 32,000 | Campinas | São Paulo | Guarani |
| Arena Barueri | 31,452 | Barueri | São Paulo | Oeste |
| Estádio do Café | 31,000 | Londrina | Paraná | Londrina EC |
| Morenão | 29,670 | Campo Grande | Mato Grosso do Sul | Comercial-MS, Operário FC |
| Santa Cruz | 29,292 | Ribeirão Preto | São Paulo | Botafogo FC |
| Boca do Jacaré | 28,800 | Taguatinga | Federal District | Brasiliense FC |
| Manduzão | 26,000 | Pouso Alegre | Minas Gerais | Pouso Alegre FC |
| Olímpico Regional | 25,000 | Cascavel | Paraná | FC Cascavel |
| São Januário | 24,584 | Rio de Janeiro | Rio de Janeiro | Vasco da Gama |
| Major Levy Sobrinho | 23,475 | Limeira | São Paulo | AA Internacional |
| Independência | 23,018 | Belo Horizonte | Minas Gerais | América Futebol Clube |
| Aflitos | 22,856 | Recife | Pernambuco | Náutico |
| Canindé | 22,375 | São Paulo | São Paulo | Portuguesa |
| Centenário | 22,132 | Caxias do Sul | Rio Grande do Sul | Caxias |
| Arena Joinville | 22,000 | Joinville | Santa Catarina | Joinville EC |
| Colosso da Lagoa | 22,000 | Erechim | Rio Grande do Sul | Ypiranga FC |
| Fonte Luminosa | 21,441 | Araraquara | São Paulo | Ferroviária |
| Kleber Andrade | 21,000 | Cariacica | Espírito Santo | Rio Branco AC |
| Bezerrão | 20,310 | Gama | Federal District | SE Gama |
| Presidente Vargas | 20,262 | Fortaleza | Ceará | Ferroviário, Floresta, Tiradentes |
| Raulino de Oliveira | 20,255 | Volta Redonda | Rio de Janeiro | Volta Redonda FC |
| Vila Capanema | 20,083 | Curitiba | Paraná | Paraná Clube |
| Arena da Floresta | 20,000 | Rio Branco | Acre | Atlético Acreano, Galvez, Rio Branco FC |
| Willie Davids | 20,000 | Maringá | Paraná | Maringá FC |
| Alfredo Jaconi | 19,924 | Caxias do Sul | Rio Grande do Sul | Juventude |
| Heriberto Hülse | 19,900 | Criciúma | Santa Catarina | Criciúma EC |
| Vail Chaves | 19,900 | Mogi Mirim | São Paulo | Mogi Mirim EC |
| Moisés Lucarelli | 19,728 | Campinas | São Paulo | AA Ponte Preta |
| Orlando Scarpelli | 19,584 | Florianópolis | Santa Catarina | Figueirense |
| Lacerdão | 19,478 | Caruaru | Pernambuco | Central SC |
| Arena do Jacaré | 19,000 | Sete Lagoas | Minas Gerais | Democrata FC |
| Almeidão | 19,000 | João Pessoa | Paraíba | Auto EC, Botafogo FC, CSP |
| Amigão | 19,000 | Campina Grande | Paraíba | Campinense |
| Alfredo de Castilho | 18,866 | Bauru | São Paulo | Noroeste |
| Adail Nunes da Silva | 18,805 | Taquaritinga | São Paulo | CA Taquaritinga |
| Parque São Jorge | 18,500 | São Paulo | São Paulo | Corinthians U20s |
| Palma Travassos | 18,277 | Ribeirão Preto | São Paulo | Comercial FC |
| Novelli Júnior | 18,000 | itu | São Paulo | Ituano |
| Barão da Serra Negra | 18,000 | Piracicaba | São Paulo | XV de Piracicaba |
| Bento Freitas | 18,000 | Pelotas | Rio Grande do Sul | Brasil de Pelotas |
| Ítalo del Cima | 18,000 | Rio de Janeiro | Rio de Janeiro | Campo Grande AC |
| Luthero Lopes | 18,000 | Rondonópolis | Mato Grosso | União Rondonópolis |
| Vila Belmiro | 17,872 | Santos | São Paulo | Santos FC |
| Ressacada | 17,826 | Florianópolis | Santa Catarina | Avaí FC |
| Nabi Abi Chedid | 17,128 | Bragança Paulista | São Paulo | Red Bull Bragantino |
| Rei Pelé | 17,126 | Maceió | Alagoas | CRB, CSA |
| Martins Pereira | 17,000 | São José dos Campos | São Paulo | Joseense, São José EC |
| Silvio Salles | 16,444 | Catanduva | São Paulo | Catanduva FC |
| Uberabão | 16,384 | Uberaba | Minas Gerais | Nacional de Uberaba, Uberaba SC |
| Décio Vitta | 16,300 | Americana | São Paulo | Rio Branco EC |
| Jóia da Princesa | 16,274 | Feira de Santana | Bahia | Fluminense de Feira |
| Curuzu | 16,200 | Belém | Pará | Paysandu |
| Herminio Ometto | 16,096 | Araras | São Paulo | União São João |
| Dario Rodrigues Leite | 16,095 | Guaratinguetá | São Paulo | Manthiqueira |
| Ipatingão | 16,000 | Ipatinga | Minas Gerais | Ipatinga FC |
| Pedro Eymard | 16,000 | Morada Nova | Ceará | |
| Gilbertão | 15,770 | Lins | São Paulo | Linense |
| Arena Condá | 15,765 | Chapecó | Santa Catarina | Chapecoense |
| 1º de Maio | 15,759 | São Bernardo do Campo | São Paulo | São Bernardo, EC São Bernardo |
| Batistão | 15,586 | Aracaju | Sergipe | Confiança, CS Sergipe |
| Boca do Lobo | 15,478 | Pelotas | Rio Grande do Sul | EC Pelotas |
| Melão | 15,471 | Varginha | Minas Gerais | Boa Esporte, Varginha EC |
| Fumeirão | 15,332 | Arapiraca | Alagoas | ASA |
| Jayme Cintra | 15,155 | Jundiaí | São Paulo | Paulista |
| Frasqueirão | 15,082 | Natal | Rio Grande do Norte | ABC |
| Bento de Abreu | 15,010 | Marília | São Paulo | Marília AC |
| 14 de Dezembro | 15,000 | Toledo | Paraná | Toledo EC |
| Alfredo Chiavegato | 15,000 | Jaguariúna | São Paulo | Jaguariúna FC |
| Arapucão | 15,000 | Jataí | Goiás | Jataiense |
| Campo dos Cordeiros | 15,000 | São Gonçalo | Rio de Janeiro | |
| Carlos Affini | 15,000 | Paraguaçu Paulista | São Paulo | Paraguaçuense |
| JK | 15,000 | Itumbiara | Goiás | Itumbiara EC |
| José Maria Campos Maia | 15,000 | Mirassol | São Paulo | Mirassol FC |
| Maria Teresa Breda | 15,000 | Olímpia | São Paulo | Olímpia |
| Moacyrzão | 15,000 | Macaé | Rio de Janeiro | Macaé Esporte |
| Montanha dos Vinhedos | 15,000 | Bento Gonçalves | Rio Grande do Sul | Esportivo |
| Romeirão | 15,000 | Juazeiro do Norte | Ceará | Icasa |
| Vermelhão da Serra | 15,000 | Passo Fundo | Rio Grande do Sul | EC Passo Fundo |
| Antonio Lins Ribeiro Guimarães | 14,913 | Santa Bárbara D´Oeste | São Paulo | União Barbarense |
| José Lancha Filho | 14,686 | Franca | São Paulo | Francana |
| Anacleto Campanella | 14,600 | São Caetano do Sul | São Paulo | AD São Caetano |
| Serrinha | 14,525 | Goiânia | Goiás | Goiás EC |
| Hudson Buck Ferreira | 14,500 | Matão | São Paulo | Matonense |
| Francisco Nogueira Filho | 14,384 | Mogi das Cruzes | São Paulo | Atlético Mogi, União FC |
| Bruno José Daniel | 14,185 | Santo André | São Paulo | EC Santo André |
| Anísio Haddad | 14,126 | São José do Rio Preto | São Paulo | Rio Preto EC |
| Jorge Ismael de Biasi | 14,096 | Novo Horizonte | São Paulo | Grêmio Novorizontino |
| Amaros | 14,074 | Itápolis | São Paulo | |
| Passo D'Areia | 14,000 | Porto Alegre | Rio Grande do Sul | EC São José |
| Soares de Azevedo | 13,971 | Muriaé | Minas Gerais | Nacional AC |
| Walter Ribeiro | 13,772 | Sorocaba | São Paulo | EC São Bento |
| Zerão | 13,680 | Macapá | Amapá | Santos-AP, Trem, Ypiranga Clube |
| Giulite Coutinho | 13,544 | Mesquita | Rio de Janeiro | America Football Club |
| Olímpico de Goiânia | 13,500 | Goiânia | Goiás | Goiânia |
| Otacília Patrício Arroyo | 13,100 | Monte Azul Paulista | São Paulo | Monte Azul |
| Fortaleza | 13,007 | Barretos | São Paulo | Barretos EC |
| Oswaldo Scatena | 13,000 | Batatais | São Paulo | Batatais FC |
| Gigante do Norte | 13,000 | Sinop | Mato Grosso | Sinop FC |
| Zezinho Magalhães | 12,978 | Jaú | São Paulo | XV de Jaú |
| Lomantão | 12,934 | Vitória da Conquista | Bahia | Vitória da Conquista |
| Joaquinzão | 12,896 | Taubaté | São Paulo | EC Taubaté |
| José Liberatti | 12,430 | Osasco | São Paulo | Grêmio Osasco Audax |
| Serra do Lago | 12,300 | Luziânia | Goiás | AA Luziânia |
| Antônio Accioly | 12,089 | Goiânia | Goiás | Goianiense |
| Cornélio de Barros | 12,070 | Salgueiro | Pernambuco | Salgueiro AC |
| Ademir Cunha | 12,000 | Paulista | Pernambuco | América-PE, Íbis SC |
| Baenão | 12,000 | Belém | Pará | Clube do Remo |
| Caio Martins | 12,000 | Niterói | Rio de Janeiro | |
| Colosso do Tapajós | 12,000 | Santarém | Pará | São Francisco FC, São Raimundo EC, Tapajós FC |
| Marizão | 12,000 | Caicó | Rio Grande do Norte | AC Coríntians, Caicó EC |
| Vieirão | 12,000 | Quiterianópolis | Ceará | |
| Antônio Aquino Lopes | 10,000 | Rio Branco | Acre | |
| Estádio Nilton Santos | 10,000 | Palmas | Tocantins | |

== Brunei ==
| Stadium | Capacity | Tenants |
|---|---|---|
| Hassanal Bolkiah National Stadium | 28,000 | Brunei national football team, DPMM FC |

== Bulgaria ==
| Stadium | Capacity | Tenants |
|---|---|---|
| Plovdiv Stadium | 55,000 | |
| Vasil Levski National Stadium | 43,500 | Bulgaria |
| Georgi Asparuhov Stadium | 29,500 | Levski Sofia |
| Ovcha Kupel Stadium | 25,556 | Slavia Sofia |
| Hristo Botev Stadium | 25,000 | Botev Vratsa |
| Beroe Stadium | 25,000 | Beroe Stara Zagora |
| Chernomorets Stadium | 25,000 | Chernomorets Burgas |
| Panayot Volov Stadium | 25,000 | FC Shumen |
| Naftex Stadium | 25,000 | Naftex Burgas |
| Balgarska Armiya Stadium | 24,000 | CSKA Sofia |
| Hristo Botev Stadium | 22,000 | Botev Plovdiv |
| Lokomotiv Stadium | 20,000 | Lokomotiv Plovdiv |
| Haskovo Stadium | 20,000 | Haskovo |
| Septemvri Stadium | 20,000 | Septemvri Sofia |
| Ivaylo Stadium | 18,000 | Etar Veliko Turnovo |
| Lokomotiv Stadium | 17,000 | Lokomotiv Sofia |
| Pleven Stadium | 15,000 | Spartak Pleven |
| Hadzhi Dimitar Stadium | 15,000 | Sliven |
| Hristo Botev Stadium | 13,000 | Yantra Gabrovo |
| Gradski Stadium | 13,000 | Dunav Ruse |
| Ticha Stadium | 12,000 | Cherno More Varna |
| Georgi Benkovski Stadium | 12,000 | Hebar Pazardzhik |
| Lokomotiv Stadium | 10,000 | Lokomotiv Ruse |

== Burkina Faso ==
| Stadium | Capacity | City | Tenants |
|---|---|---|---|
| Stade du 4 Août | 29,800 | Ouagadougou | Burkina Faso national football team, Étoile Filante de Ouagadougou |
| Stade Municipal | 25,000 | Ouagadougou | |
| Stade Wobi Bobo-Dioulasso | 10,000 | Bobo-Dioulasso | US FRAN |

== Burundi ==
| Stadium | Capacity | City | Tenants |
|---|---|---|---|
| Intwari Stadium | 10,000 | Bujumbura | |
| Stade Ingoma | 10,000 | Gitega | |

== Cambodia ==
| Stadium | Capacity | Tenants |
|---|---|---|
| Morodok Techo National Stadium | 60,000 | Cambodia national football team |
| Phnom Penh National Olympic stadium | 30,000 | |

== Cameroon ==
| Stadium | Capacity | Tenants |
|---|---|---|
| Olembe Stadium | 60,000 | Cameroon national football team |
| Japoma Stadium | 50,000 | Cameroon national football team |
| Stade Omnisports Ahmadou Ahidjo | 42,500 | Cameroon national football team, Tonnerre Yaoundé, and Canon Yaoundé |
| Stade de la Réunification | 30,000 | Union Douala |
| Stade Omnisports Roumdé Adjia | 22,000 | Coton Sport Garoua |
| Stade Municipal | 20,000 | Panthère du Ndé |

== Canada ==
| Stadium | Capacity | City | Province | Tenants | Notes |
|---|---|---|---|---|---|
| Olympic Stadium | 61,004 | Montreal | Quebec | Part-time home of the CF Montréal. Former home of the Montreal Manic. Host site for the 1976 Summer Olympics. A site for the 2007 FIFA U-20 World Cup, 2014 FIFA U-20 Women's World Cup, and 2015 FIFA Women's World Cup. | Domed stadium |
| Commonwealth Stadium | 56,302 | Edmonton | Alberta | Canada men's national team, Canada women's national team. Former home of the Edmonton Drillers. A site for the 2007 FIFA U-20 World Cup, 2002 FIFA U-19 Women's World Championship, 2014 FIFA U-20 Women's World Cup, and 2015 FIFA Women's World Cup. Formerly FC Edmonton's home for the Canadian Championship. | |
| BC Place | 54,320 | Vancouver | British Columbia | Vancouver Whitecaps FC, Canada men's national team. Former home of the Vancouver Whitecaps. A site for the 2015 FIFA Women's World Cup | |
| Rogers Centre | 47,568 | Toronto | Ontario | Formerly occasional Canada matches, and rare winter matches and friendlies for Toronto FC | Retractable roof Renovated for baseball-only use in 2016. |
| McMahon Stadium | 37,317 | Calgary | Alberta | Former home of the Calgary Boomers and Calgary Mustangs | Expandable to 46,020 |
| Princess Auto Stadium | 33,234 | Winnipeg | Manitoba | Former home of Valour FC. A site for the 2015 FIFA Women's World Cup | |
| Mosaic Stadium | 33,000 | Regina | Saskatchewan | Regina Riot | Expandable to 40,000 |
| BMO Field | 28,351 | Toronto | Ontario | Toronto FC, Canada men's national team, Canada women's national team. A site of the 2007 FIFA U-20 World Cup and 2014 FIFA U-20 Women's World Cup | Expandable to 40,000 |
| TD Place Stadium | 24,000 | Ottawa | Ontario | Atlético Ottawa. Former home of the Ottawa Fury. A host site for the 1976 Summer Olympics soccer matches, 2007 FIFA U-20 World Cup, and 2015 FIFA Women's World Cup | Expandable to 40,000 |
| Tim Hortons Field | 24,000 | Hamilton | Ontario | Soccer at the 2015 Pan American Games, Forge FC. | Expandable to 40,000 |
| Percival Molson Memorial Stadium | 23,420 | Montreal | Quebec | McGill Redbirds | |
| Saputo Stadium | 19,619 | Montreal | Quebec | CF Montréal. Formerly some Canada men's and women's national team matches | |
| PEPS (Telus) Stadium | 12,257 | Québec | Quebec | Laval Rouge-et-Or. Formerly some Montreal Impact matches | Expandable to 19,500 |

== Cape Verde ==
| Stadium | Capacity | City | Region | Tenants |
|---|---|---|---|---|
| Estádio Nacional de Cabo Verde | 15,000 | Praia | Santiago South Zone | National football team |

== Central African Republic ==
| Stadium | Capacity | City | Tenants |
|---|---|---|---|
| Barthélemy Boganda Stadium | 35,000 | Bangui | Central African Republic national football team |

== Chad ==
| Stadium | Capacity | City | Tenants |
|---|---|---|---|
| Stade olympique Maréchal Idriss Déby Itno | 30,000 | N'Djamena | Chad national football team |
| Stade Omnisports Idriss Mahamat Ouya | 20,000 | N'Djamena | |

== China ==
| Stadium | Capacity | City | Province | Tenants |
|---|---|---|---|---|
| Guangdong Olympic Stadium | 80,012 | Guangzhou | Guangdong | 2001 National Games of China, 2009 Asian Athletics Championships, 2010 Asian Games |
| Beijing National Stadium | 80,000 | Beijing | Beijing | 2008 Summer Olympics, 2015 World Championships in Athletics, 2022 Winter Olympics |
| Hangzhou Sports Park | 80,000 | Hangzhou | Zhejiang | 2022 Asian Games |
| Shanghai Stadium | 72,000 | Shanghai | Shanghai | Shanghai Shenhua, 1999 National Games of China, 2007 Special Olympics World Summer Games, Football at the 2008 Summer Olympics |
| Workers' Stadium | 68,000 | Beijing | Beijing | Beijing Guoan, former venue of 2023 AFC Asian Cup (Note: Originally, the tournament was to be held in China, with the Beijing venue being the Workers Stadium. But on 14 May 2022, owing to COVID-19 in China and China's Zero-COVID policy, China had to withdraw from being the host and gave the host to Qatar on 17 October.) |
| Dalian Barracuda Bay Football Stadium | 63,000 | Dalian | Liaoning | Dalian Yingbo, former venue of 2023 AFC Asian Cup |
| Shanxi Sports Centre Stadium | 62,000 | Taiyuan | Shanxi | |
| Nanjing Olympic Sports Centre Stadium | 61,443 | Nanjing | Jiangsu | 2005 National Games of China, 2014 Summer Youth Olympic Games |
| Dalian Sports Centre Stadium | 61,000 | Dalian | Liaoning | |
| Shenzhen Universiade Sports Centre Stadium | 60,334 | Shenzhen | Guangdong | 2011 Summer Universiade |
| Xiamen Egret Stadium | 60,592 | Xiamen | Fujian | former venue of 2023 AFC Asian Cup |
| Guangxi Sports Centre Stadium | 60,000 | Nanning | Guangxi | |
| Haixia Olympic Centre Stadium | 60,000 | Fuzhou | Fujian | |
| Hefei Olympic Sports Centre Stadium | 60,000 | Hefei | Anhui | |
| Longxing Football Stadium | 60,000 | Chongqing | Chongqing | former venue of 2023 AFC Asian Cup |
| Ordos Sports Centre Stadium | 60,000 | Ordos | Inner Mongolia | |
| Shenyang Olympic Sports Centre Stadium | 60,000 | Shenyang | Liaoning | Football at the 2008 Summer Olympics, 2013 National Games of China |
| Lanzhou Olympic Sports Centre Stadium | 60,000 | Lanzhou | Gansu | Lanzhou Longyuan Athletic F.C. |
| Xi'an Olympic Sports Centre Stadium | 60,000 | Xi'an | Shaanxi | |
| Zhengzhou Olympic Sports Centre Stadium | 60,000 | Zhengzhou | Henan | |
| Xi'an International Football Center | 59,000 | Xi'an | Shaanxi | former venue of 2023 AFC Asian Cup |
| Chongqing Olympic Sports Centre Stadium | 58,680 | Chongqing | Chongqing | 2004 AFC Asian Cup |
| Tianhe Stadium | 58,500 | Guangzhou | Guangdong | 1987 National Games of China, 1991 FIFA Women's World Cup, Football at the 2010 Asian Games, 2011 Summer Universiade |
| Nanchang International Sport Centre Stadium | 58,235 | Nanchang | Jiangxi | |
| Jinan Olympic Sports Centre Stadium | 56,808 | Jinan | Shandong | Shandong Taishan, 2009 National Games of China |
| Helong Stadium | 55,000 | Changsha | Hunan | |
| Tianjin Olympic Centre Stadium | 54,696 | Tianjin | Tianjin | Tianjin Jinmen Tiger, 2007 FIFA Women's World Cup, 2008 Summer Olympics football tournament, 2017 National Games of China |
| Wuhan Sports Centre Stadium | 54,357 | Wuhan | Hubei | Wuhan Three Towns, 2007 FIFA Women's World Cup |
| Phoenix Hill Football Stadium | 52,800 | Chengdu | Sichuan | Chengdu Rongcheng, former venue of 2023 AFC Asian Cup |
| Yellow Dragon Sports Centre Stadium | 52,672 | Hangzhou | Zhejiang | Hangzhou Greentown, 2007 FIFA Women's World Cup, Football at the 2022 Asian Games |
| Guiyang Olympic Sports Centre Stadium | 51,636 | Guiyang | Guizhou | Guizhou Zhucheng Athletic F.C. |
| Hohhot City Stadium | 51,632 | Hohhot | Inner Mongolia | |
| Shaanxi Province Stadium | 50,100 | Xi'an | Shaanxi | |
| Harbin ICE Sports Centre Stadium | 50,000 | Harbin | Heilongjiang | 1996 Asian Winter Games, 2009 Winter Universiade |
| Qingdao Youth Football Stadium | 50,000 | Qingdao | Shandong | Qingdao Hainiu, former venue of 2023 AFC Asian Cup |
| Wenzhou Olympic Sports Centre Stadium | 50,000 | Wenzhou | Zhejiang | Football at the 2022 Asian Games |
| Jiangxi Olympic Stadium | 50,000 | Nanchang | Jiangxi | |
| Henan Provincial Sports Centre Stadium | 48,000 | Zhengzhou | Henan | Henan Jianye W.F.C. |
| Sanya Sports Centre Egret Stadium | 45,000 | Sanya | Hainan | |
| Qingdao Guoxin Stadium | 45,000 | Qingdao | Shandong | Qingdao Huanghai |
| Zibo Sports Centre Stadium | 45,000 | Zibo | Shandong | 2010 AFC U-19 Championship |
| Suzhou Kunshan Football Stadium | 45,000 | Suzhou | Jiangsu | former venue of 2023 AFC Asian Cup |
| Weifang Sports Centre Stadium | 45,000 | Weifang | Shandong | |
| Shenzhen Sports Centre Stadium | 45,000 | Shenzhen | Guangdong | Shenzhen Peng City |
| Bao'an Stadium | 44,050 | Shenzhen | Guangdong | Shenzhen Juniors, 2011 Summer Universiade |
| Shandong Stadium | 43,700 | Jinan | Shandong | 2004 AFC Asian Cup |
| Jinzhou Binhai Sports Centre Stadium | 43,000 | Jinzhou | Liaoning | |
| Xinjiang Sports Centre Stadium | 42,300 | Ürümqi | Xinjiang | |
| Wuyuan River Stadium | 41,506 | Haikou | Hainan | |
| Suzhou Olympic Sports Centre Stadium | 40,933 | Suzhou | Jiangsu | |
| Baotou Olympic Sports Centre Stadium | 40,545 | Baotou | Inner Mongolia | Inner Mongolia Caoshangfei |
| Anqing Sports Centre Stadium | 40,000 | Anqing | Anhui | |
| Anyang City Cultural and Sports Centre Stadium | 40,000 | Anyang | Henan | |
| Yantai Sports Park Stadium | 40,000 | Yantai | Shandong | |
| Yichang Olympic Sports Centre Stadium | 40,000 | Yichang | Hubei | |
| Tuodong Stadium | 40,000 | Kunming | Yunnan | |
| Xianyang Olympic Sports Centre Stadium | 40,000 | Xianyang | Shaanxi | |
| Anshan Sports Centre Stadium | 40,000 | Anshan | Liaoning | |
| Xining Stadium | 40,000 | Xining | Qinghai | |
| Chuzhou Olympic Sports Centre Stadium | 40,000 | Chuzhou | Anhui | |
| Tiexi New District Sports Centre Stadium | 40,000 | Shenyang | Liaoning | Liaoning Tieren |
| Helan Mountain Stadium | 39,872 | Yinchuan | Ningxia | |
| Guangzhou Higher Education Mega Centre Central Stadium | 39,346 | Guangzhou | Guangdong | Football at the 2010 Asian Games |
| Chengdu Sports Centre Stadium | 39,225 | Chengdu | Sichuan | 2010 AFC Women's Asian Cup |
| Huludao City Sports Centre Stadium | 38,798 | Huludao | Liaoning | Dandong Tengyue |
| Changchun City Stadium | 38,500 | Changchun | Jilin | Changchun Yatai |
| Pudong Football Stadium | 37,000 | Shanghai | Shanghai | Shanghai Port, former venue of 2023 AFC Asian Cup |
| Ma'anshan City Sports Centre Stadium | 36,542 | Ma'anshan | Anhui | |
| TEDA Football Stadium | 36,390 | Tianjin | Tianjin | Tianjin Jinmen Tiger, former venue of 2023 AFC Asian Cup |
| Olympic Sports Centre | 36,228 | Beijing | Beijing | 1990 Asian Games, Modern pentathlon at the 2008 Summer Olympics |
| Kuishan Sports Centre Stadium | 36,000 | Rizhao | Shandong | |
| Jiaozuo Sports Centre Stadium | 35,881 | Jiaozuo | Henan | |
| Panjin Jinxiu Stadium | 35,600 | Panjin | Liaoning | |
| Zunyi Olympic Sports Centre Stadium | 35,597 | Zunyi | Guizhou | |
| Ordos Stadium | 35,107 | Ordos | Inner Mongolia | 2012 Miss World |
| Nanyang Sports Centre Stadium | 35,000 | Nanyang | Henan | |
| Suzhou City Stadium | 35,000 | Suzhou | Jiangsu | Suzhou Dongwu |
| Liuzhou Sports Centre Stadium | 35,000 | Beijing | Beijing | |
| Xuzhou Olympic Sports Centre Stadium | 35,000 | Xuzhou | Jiangsu | |
| Yingkou Olympic Sports Centre Stadium | 35,000 | Yingkou | Liaoning | |
| Zhuhai Sports Centre Stadium | 35,000 | Zhuhai | Guangdong | |
| Qujing Cultural and Sports Park | 34,162 | Qujing | Yunnan | |
| Quanzhou Sports Centre Stadium | 34,000 | Quanzhou | Fujian | |
| Qinhuangdao Olympic Sports Centre Stadium | 33,572 | Qinhuangdao | Hebei | Football at the 2008 Summer Olympics |
| Hongkou Football Stadium (1999) | 33,060 | Shanghai | Shanghai | Shanghai Shenhua, 2007 FIFA Women's World Cup |
| Huangshi Olympic Sports Centre Stadium | 32,059 | Huangshi | Hubei | |
| Weinan Sports Centre Stadium | 32,000 | Weinan | Shaanxi | Shaanxi Union F.C. |
| Mashipu Stadium | 32,000 | Nanchong | Sichuan | |
| Xiamen Stadium | 32,000 | Xiamen | Fujian | |
| Datianwan Stadium | 32,000 | Chongqing | Chongqing | |
| Fushun Leifeng Stadium | 32,000 | Fushun | Liaoning | |
| Hailanjiang Stadium | 32,000 | Longjing | Jilin | |
| Chifeng Stadium | 32,000 | Chifeng | Inner Mongolia | |
| Shanxi Provincial Stadium | 32,000 | Taiyuan | Shanxi | |
| Dingbian County Sports Centre Stadium | 32,000 | Yulin | Shaanxi | |
| Tai'an Sports Centre Stadium | 32,000 | Tai'an | Shandong | Tai'an Tiankuang F.C. |
| Cangzhou Stadium | 31,836 | Cangzhou | Hebei | |
| Changchun Olympic Park Stadium | 31,684 | Changchun | Jilin | |
| Xiong'an Sports Centre Stadium | 31,460 | Xiong'an | Hebei | |
| Xinxiang Stadium | 31,200 | Xinxiang | Henan | |
| Beijing Fengtai Stadium | 31,043 | Beijing | Beijing | |
| Zhenjiang Sports and Exhibition Centre Stadium | 31,000 | Zhenjiang | Jiangsu | |
| Jiujiang Stadium | 31,000 | Jiujiang | Jiangxi | |
| Bazhong Stadium | 30,812 | Bazhong | Sichuan | |
| Jinzhou Stadium | 30,775 | Dalian | Liaoning | Dalian K'un City F.C. |
| Langfang Stadium | 30,040 | Langfang | Hebei | |
| Xiangyang Olympic Sports Centre Stadium | 30,000 | Xiangyang | Hubei | |
| Chenzhou Olympic Sports Centre Stadium | 30,000 | Chenzhou | Hunan | |
| Yellow River Sports Centre Stadium | 30,000 | Wuzhong | Ningxia | |
| Haihe Educational Football Stadium | 30,000 | Tianjian | Tianjian | |
| Qilihe Stadium | 30,000 | Lanzhou | Gansu | |
| Quzhou Stadium | 30,000 | Quzhou | Zhejiang | |
| Gaoyou Sports Centre Stadium | 30,000 | Gaoyou | Jiangsu | |
| Loudi Stadium | 30,000 | Loudi | Hunan | |
| Jinshan Football Stadium | 30,000 | Shanghai | Shanghai | |
| Hengshui City Olympic Sports Centre Stadium | 30,000 | Hengshui | Hebei | |
| Kunshan Stadium | 30,000 | Kunshan | Jiangsu | |
| Yiyang Stadium | 30,000 | Yiyang | Hunan | Hunan Billows |
| Bengbu Olympic Sports Centre Stadium | 30,000 | Bengbu | Anhui | |
| Tongling Sports Centre Stadium | 30,000 | Tongling | Anhui | |
| Yanji Nationwide Fitness Centre Stadium | 30,000 | Yanji | Jilin | Yanbian Longding |
| Handan City Sports Centre Stadium | 30,000 | Handan | Hebei | |
| Puwan New District Stadium | 30,000 | Dalian | Liaoning | |
| Guigang Sports Centre Stadium | 30,000 | Guigang | Guangxi | |
| Datong Sports Park Stadium | 30,000 | Datong | Shanxi | |
| Wuhan Five Rings Sports Centre | 30,000 | Wuhan | Hubei | |
| Danzhou Sports Centre Stadium | 30,000 | Danzhou | Hainan | |
| Taizhou Sports Park Stadium | 30,000 | Taizhou | Zhejiang | |
| Leshan Olympic Centre Stadium | 30,000 | Leshan | Sichuan | |
| Qingyuan Sports Centre Stadium | 30,000 | Qingyuan | Guangdong | |
| Zaozhuang Sports and Cultural Centre Stadium | 30,000 | Zaozhuang | Shandong | |
| Bloomage LIVE Yudong HI-ZONE Stadium | 30,000 | Chongqing | Chongqing | |
| Zoucheng Sports Centre Stadium | 30,000 | Zoucheng | Shandong | |
| Qionghai Cultural and Sports Centre Stadium | 30,000 | Qionghai | Hainan | |
| Zhengzhou Hanghai Stadium | 29,860 | Zhengzhou | Henan | Henan FC |
| Hulunbuir Stadium | 29,589 | Hulunbuir | Inner Mongolia | |
| Haihe Educational Football Stadium | 29,356 | Tianjin | Tianjin | |
| Maoming Olympic Sports Centre Stadium | 29,325 | Maoming | Guangdong | |
| Suqian Olympic Sports Centre Stadium | 29,151 | Suqian | Jiangsu | |
| Yutong International Sports Centre Stadium | 29,000 | Shijiazhuang | Hebei | Shijiazhuang Gongfu |
| Wuxi Sports Stadium | 28,146 | Wuxi | Jiangsu | Wuxi Wugo |
| Jiangning Stadium | 28,000 | Nanjing | Jiangsu | |
| Horqin Sports Centre Stadium | 28,000 | Tongliao | Inner Mongolia | |
| Changzhi Sports Centre Stadium | 27,653 | Changzhi | Shanxi | |
| Wendeng Sports Park Stadium | 27,500 | Weihai | Shandong | |
| Chengdu Longquanyi Football Stadium | 27,000 | Chengdu | Sichuan | 2004 AFC Asian Cup |
| Huitang Stadium | 27,000 | Meizhou | Guangdong | Meizhou Hakka |
| Xiaogan Stadium | 27,000 | Xiaogan | Hubei | |
| Jinhua Stadium | 27,000 | Jinhua | Zhejiang | Football at the 2022 Asian Games |
| Qianxi County Olympic Sports Centre Stadium | 27,000 | Bijie | Guizhou | |
| Jinzhou City Stadium | 26,800 | Jinzhou | Liaoning | |
| Shuangliu Sports Centre | 26,000 | Chengdu | Sichuan | |
| Wanzhou Pailou Sports Stadium | 26,000 | Chongqing | Chongqing | |
| Chongqing Olympic Sports Centre Stadium | 26,514 | Chongqing | Chongqing | |
| Qinzhou Sports Centre Stadium | 26,400 | Qinzhou | Guangxi | |
| Yingkou Stadium | 26,020 | Yingkou | Liaoning | |
| Huichuan Sports Centre Stadium | 26,000 | Zunyi | Guizhou | |
| Nanchang Bayi Stadium | 26,000 | Nanchang | Jiangxi | |
| Guangdong Provincial People's Stadium | 25,914 | Guangzhou | Guangdong | Football at the 2010 Asian Games |
| Xiwai Stadium | 25,913 | Dazhou | Sichuan | |
| Xilingol Stadium | 25,685 | Xilinhot | Inner Mongolia | |
| Liupanshui Stadium | 25,450 | Liupanshui | Guizhou | |
| Yongchuan Stadium | 25,017 | Chongqing | Chongqing | |
| Jiangmen Sports Centre Stadium | 25,000 | Jiangmen | Guangdong | |
| Nanhe Sports Centre Stadium | 25,000 | Mianyang | Sichuan | |
| Longyan City Stadium | 25,000 | Longyan | Fujian | |
| Zhaoqing Sports Centre Stadium | 25,000 | Zhaoqing | Guangdong | |
| Nanchuan Stadium | 25,000 | Chongqing | Chongqing | |
| Wuhai Stadium | 25,000 | Wuhai | Inner Mongolia | |
| Pengshui New Town Sports Centre Stadium | 25,000 | Chongqing | Chongqing | |
| Shangri-La County Stadium | 25,000 | Shangri-La City | Yunnan | |
| Derun Greentown Stadium | 25,000 | Shouguang | Shandong | |
| Ningbo Sports Development Centre Stadium | 25,000 | Ningbo | Zhejiang | |
| Sanmen County Jinlin Lake Sports Centre Stadium | 25,000 | Taizhou | Zhejiang | |
| Beibei Jinyun Cultural Sports Centre Stadium | 25,000 | Chongqing | Chongqing | |
| Anshun Sports Centre Stadium | 25,000 | Anshun | Guizhou | |
| Luohe Stadium | 25,000 | Luohe | Henan | |
| Xinyang Stadium | 25,000 | Xinyang | Henan | |
| Puyang Stadium | 25,000 | Puyang | Henan | |
| Jiangwan Stadium | 25,000 | Shanghai | Shanghai | |
| Quiannan National Fitness Centre Stadium | 25,000 | Duyun | Guizhou | |
| Kaili National Stadium | 25,000 | Kaili | Guizhou | |
| Wuyi New District Sports Centre Stadium | 25,000 | Nanping | Fujian | |
| Guizhou Meitan Sports Centre Stadium | 24,543 | Zunyi | Guizhou | |
| Dianjiang Stadium | 24,000 | Chongqing | Chongqing | |
| Xiannongtan Stadium | 24,000 | Beijing | Beijing | Beijing W.F.C. |
| Yueyang Sports Centre Stadium | 23,619 | Yueyang | Hunan | |
| Development Area Stadium | 23,400 | Changchun | Jilin | Changchun Dazhong Zhuoyue W.F.C. |
| Sanming Stadium | 23,000 | Sanming | Fujian | |
| Baoji Stadium | 23,000 | Baoji | Shaanxi | |
| Shaoyang City Sports Centre Stadium | 23,000 | Shaoyang | Hunan | |
| Xiangxi Culture and Sports Exhibition Centre Stadium | 23,000 | Xiangxi | Hunan | |
| Qian'an Olympic Sports Centre Stadium | 22,775 | Qian'an | Hebei | |
| Lijiang Stadium | 22,400 | Lijiang | Yunnan | |
| Tianjin Tuanbo Football Stadium | 22,320 | Tianjin | Tianjin | |
| Dongguan Stadium | 22,191 | Dongguan | Guangdong | |
| Xinhua Lu Stadium | 22,140 | Wuhan | Hubei | Hubei Istar F.C. |
| Jiangsu Nantong Stadium | 22,000 | Nantong | Jiangsu | |
| Suihua Stadium | 22,000 | Suihua | Heilongjiang | |
| Zhumadian City Stadium | 22,000 | Zhumadian | Henan | |
| Sanmenxia Cultural Sports Centre Stadium | 22,000 | Sanmenxia | Henan | |
| Chongzuo Sports Centre Stadium | 22,000 | Chongzuo | Guangxi | |
| Fuling Stadium | 22,000 | Chongqing | Chongqing | |
| Ganzhou City Sports Centre Stadium | 22,000 | Ganzhou | Jiangxi | |
| Yichun Stadium | 22,000 | Yichun | Jiangxi | |
| Shantou Stadium | 22,000 | Shantou | Guangdong | |
| Xiangyang Stadium | 22,000 | Xiangyang | Hubei | |
| Wanzhou Stadium | 22,000 | Chongqing | Chongqing | |
| Fuyuan County Sports Centre Stadium | 21,800 | Qujing | Yunnan | |
| Shaoguan Stadium | 21,570 | Shaoguan | Guangdong | |
| Xichang Stadium | 21,532 | Xichang | Sichuan | |
| Renshou County Stadium | 21,080 | Meishan | Sichuan | |
| Xiangtan Sports Centre Stadium | 21,000 | Xiangtan | Hunan | |
| Hohhot National Northern Football Training Stadium | 21,000 | Hohhot | Inner Mongolia | |
| Zhaoyuan Stadium | 21,000 | Zhaoyuan | Shandong | |
| Shangrao Stadium | 21,000 | Shangrao | Jiangxi | |
| Panzhihua Stadium | 21,000 | Panzhihua | Sichuan | |
| Liangping County National Fitness Centre Stadium | 20,937 | Chongqing | Chongqing | |
| Huize County Stadium | 20,882 | Qujing | Yunnan | |
| Zhoushan Stadium | 20,800 | Zhoushan | Zhejiang | |
| Chiping County Cultural Sports Centre Stadium | 20,600 | Liaocheng | Shandong | |
| Tiantai Stadium | 20,525 | Qingdao | Shandong | |
| Kuytun City Sports Centre Stadium | 20,471 | Kuytun | Xinjiang | |
| Linxia Olympic Sports Centre Stadium | 20,410 | Linxia | Gansu | |
| Yingtan Stadium | 20,386 | Yingtan | Jiangxi | |
| Ji'an National Fitness Sports Centre Stadium | 20,380 | Ji'an | Jiangxi | |
| Meixian Tsang Hin-chi Stadium | 20,221 | Meizhou | Guangdong | |
| Lanshan Park Stadium | 20,176 | Yinchuan | Ningxia | |
| Manzhouli Stadium | 20,153 | Manzhouli | Inner Mongolia | |
| Huainan Sports Stadium | 20,103 | Huainan | Anhui | |
| Baise Sports Centre Stadium | 20,080 | Baise | Guangxi | Guangxi Lanhang F.C. |
| Desheng Sports Centre Stadium | 20,000 | Foshan | Guangdong | |
| Yuhuan Sports Centre Stadium | 20,000 | Yuhuan | Zhejiang | |
| Zhanjiang Sports Centre Stadium | 20,000 | Zhanjiang | Guangdong | |
| Guzhenkou University City Sports Centre Stadium | 20,000 | Qingdao | Shandong | |
| Nancheng Sports Park Stadium | 20,000 | Dongguan | Guangdong | |
| Qijiang County Stadium | 20,000 | Chongqing | Chongqing | |
| Weng'an County Centre Stadium | 20,000 | Qiannan | Guizhou | |
| Hagongda Stadium | 20,000 | Harbin | Heilongjiang | |
| Nanshan Stadium | 20,000 | Qiqihar | Heilongjiang | |
| Luzhou Olympic Sports Park Stadium | 20,000 | Luzhou | Sichuan | |
| Aoyuan Stadium | 20,000 | Guangyuan | Sichuan | |
| Yunxi County Cultural and Sports Centre Stadium | 20,000 | Shiyan | Hubei | |
| Nanhu Stadium | 20,000 | Zigong | Sichuan | |
| Pingdingshan Stadium | 20,000 | Pingdingshan | Henan | |
| Xingyi Jinzhou Sports Centre Stadium | 20,000 | Xingyi | Guizhou | |
| Haidong City Sports Centre Stadium | 20,000 | Haidong | Qinghai | |
| Fuzhou City Stadium | 20,000 | Fuzhou | Jiangxi | |
| Shenzhen Bay Sports Centre Stadium | 20,000 | Shenzhen | Guangdong | |
| Deqing County Sports Centre Stadium | 20,000 | Deqing | Zhejiang | |
| Shaoxing China Textile City Sports Centre Stadium | 20,000 | Shaoxing | Zhejiang | |
| Zhaoqing New District Stadium | 20,000 | Zhaoqing | Guangdong | |
| Yulin Stadium | 20,000 | Yulin | Guangxi | |
| Panjin City Stadium | 20,000 | Panjin | Liaoning | |
| Liaoyang Stadium | 20,000 | Liaoyang | Liaoning | |
| Hebei University Stadium | 20,000 | Baoding | Hebei | |
| Guilin Stadium | 20,000 | Guilin | Guangxi | |
| Taihu County National Fitness Centre Stadium | 20,000 | Anqing | Anhui | |
| Xinyazhou Stadium | 20,000 | Kunming | Yunnan | |
| Qiaoxiang Sports Centre Stadium | 20,000 | Quanzhou | Fujian | |
| Yangquan Stadium | 20,000 | Yangquan | Shanxi | |
| Chuxiong Stadium | 20,000 | Chuxiong | Yunnan | |
| Lhasa Cultural Sports Centre Stadium | 20,000 | Lhasa | Tibet | |
| Baiyin Stadium | 20,000 | Baiyin | Gansu | |
| Tianshui Sports Centre Stadium | 20,000 | Tianshui | Gansu | |
| Huanggang Sports Centre Stadium | 20,000 | Huanggang | Hubei | |
| Jingzhou Stadium | 20,000 | Jingzhou | Hubei | |
| Shiyan Stadium | 20,000 | Shiyan | Hubei | |
| Tongliang Long Stadium | 20,000 | Chongqing | Chongqing | Chongqing Tonglianglong F.C. |
| Binhu Stadium | 19,656 | Suizhou | Hubei | |
| Dazu Stadium | 19,500 | Chongqing | Chongqing | |
| Wutaishan Stadium | 19,200 | Nanjing | Jiangsu | |
| Yunnan Kunming Yiliang Stadium | 19,050 | Yiliang | Yunnan | |
| Xiushan Stadium | 19,000 | Chongqing | Chongqing | |
| Jingdezhen City Sports Centre Stadium | 19,000 | Jingdezhen | Jiangxi | |
| Lishui Stadium | 19,000 | Lishui | Zhejiang | |
| Hunchun City Stadium | 18,900 | Hunchun | Jilin | |
| Xinyu Stadium | 18,800 | Xinyu | Jiangxi | |
| Qingyang Stadium | 18,620 | Qingyang | Gansu | |
| Weishan County Sports Centre Stadium | 18,491 | Weishan | Shandong | |
| Yuexiushan Stadium | 18,000 | Guangzhou | Guangdong | Guangdong GZ-Power F.C., Football at the 2010 Asian Games |
| Anqing Stadium | 18,000 | Anqing | Heilongjiang | |
| Jinjiang Stadium | 18,000 | Jinjiang | Fujian | |
| Alxa Stadium | 18,000 | Alxa | Inner Mongolia | |
| Wenzhou Sports Centre Stadium | 18,000 | Wenzhou | Zhejiang | Football at the 2022 Asian Games |
| Institute of Industry & Technology Stadium | 18,000 | Xinzheng | Henan | |
| Xigong Stadium | 18,000 | Luoyang | Henan | |
| Central South University Stadium | 18,000 | Changsha | Hunan | |
| Leshan Stadium | 18,000 | Leshan | Sichuan | |
| Deyang Stadium | 18,000 | Deyang | Sichuan | |
| Wuzhou Sports Centre Stadium | 18,000 | Wuzhou | Guangxi | |
| Hefei Stadium | 18,000 | Hefei | Anhui | |
| Chaoyang City Stadium | 18,000 | Chaoyang | Liaoning | |
| Jiangjin County Stadium | 18,000 | Chongqing | Chongqing | |
| Yuanbaoshan Stadium | 18,000 | Zhaotong | Yunnan | |
| Youth Olympic Sports Park | 18,000 | Nanjing | Jiangsu | Nanjing City |
| Shizuishan Stadium | 18,000 | Shizuishan | Ningxia | |
| Xuji Olympic Sports Centre Stadium | 18,000 | Xuzhou | Jiangsu | |
| Tongnan Stadium | 17,926 | Chongqing | Chongqing | |
| Zhangzhou Huayang Stadium | 17,820 | Zhangzhou | Fujian | |
| Yixing City Sports Centre Stadium | 17,000 | Yixing | Jiangsu | |
| Changde City Stadium | 17,000 | Changde | Hunan | |
| Yanan Stadium | 17,000 | Yanan | Shaanxi | |
| Yangzhou Stadium | 17,000 | Yangzhou | Jiangsu | |
| Ya'an Stadium | 16,500 | Ya'an | Sichuan | |
| Shuyang County Stadium | 16,328 | Suqian | Jiangsu | |
| Luquan County Stadium | 16,000 | Kunming | Yunnan | |
| Lincang City Sports Centre Stadium | 16,000 | Lincang | Yunnan | |
| Chengnan Stadium | 16,000 | Wenshan | Yunnan | |
| Sanya Stadium | 16,000 | Sanya | Hainan | |
| Yuanshen Sports Centre Stadium | 16,000 | Shanghai | Shanghai | |
| Ningbo Cixi Stadium | 16,000 | Ningbo | Zhejiang | |
| Jiayuguan Stadium | 15,864 | Jiayuguan | Gansu | |
| Haicang Sports Centre Stadium | 15,775 | Xiamen | Jiangsu | |
| Suining County Stadium | 15,646 | Xuzhou | Jiangsu | |
| Poyang Lake Sports Centre Stadium | 15,576 | Poyang | Jiangxi | |
| Ruzhou Sports Centre Stadium | 15,466 | Ruzhou | Henan | |
| Wenzhou Yueqing Sports Centre Stadium | 15,049 | Wenzhou | Zhejiang | |
| University Town Stadium | 15,010 | Shenzhen | Guangdong | |
| Chengde Olympic Sports Centre Stadium | 15,107 | Chengde | Hebei | |
| Bengbu Stadium | 15,000 | Bengbu | Anhui | |
| Yuncheng Stadium | 15,000 | Yuncheng | Shanxi | |
| Haizhou Stadium | 15,000 | Fuxin | Liaoning | |
| Ruijin Sports Centre Stadium | 15,000 | Ganzhou | Jiangxi | |
| Beishan Stadium | 15,000 | Mudanjiang | Heilongjiang | |
| Polytechnic University Stadium | 15,000 | Jiaozuo | Henan | |
| Harbin University of Commerce Stadium | 15,000 | Harbin | Heilongjiang | |
| Hecheng Stadium | 15,000 | Qiqihar | Heilongjiang | |
| Chengdong Stadium | 15,000 | Ankang | Shaanxi | |
| Liaoyuan Stadium | 15,000 | Liaoyuan | Jilin | |
| Fuquan City Sports Centre Stadium | 15,000 | Fuquan | Guizhou | |
| Tianzhu Stadium | 15,000 | Tianzhu | Guizhou | |
| Linquan County Stadium | 15,000 | Fuyang | Anhui | |
| Liuyang Stadium | 15,000 | Liuyang | Hunan | |
| Boluo County Stadium | 15,000 | Meizhou | Guangdong | |
| Zhongnan University of Economics and Law Stadium | 15,000 | Wuhan | Hubei | |
| Longquan Middle School Stadium | 15,000 | Jingmen | Hubei | |
| Ezhou Stadium | 15,000 | Ezhou | Hubei | |
| Wujiang Stadium | 15,000 | Suzhou | Jiangsu | |
| Dehong Stadium | 15,000 | Mangshi | Yunnan | |
| Pu'er Stadium | 15,000 | Pu'er | Yunnan | |
| Honghe Stadium | 15,000 | Mengzi | Yunnan | |
| Ningde Stadium | 15,000 | Ningde | Fujian | |
| Yuxi City Stadium | 15,000 | Yuxi | Yunnan | |
| Ying Tung Stadium | 14,818 | Guangzhou | Guangdong | Football at the 2010 Asian Games |
| Rugao Olympic Sports Centre Stadium | 14,815 | Rugao | Jiangsu | Nantong Zhiyun |
| Shizhu County Stadium | 14,186 | Chongqing | Chongqing | |
| Hangzhou Jianggan-qu Cultural Sports Centre Stadium | 14,000 | Hangzhou | Zhejiang | |
| Wulong Stadium | 14,000 | Chongqing | Chongqing | |
| Hongchen Stadium | 14,000 | Qingdao | Shandong | |
| Institute of Technology Stadium | 14,000 | Anyang | Henan | |
| Northwest University for Nationalities Stadium | 14,000 | Lanzhou | Gansu | |
| Shangcheng Sports Centre Stadium | 13,544 | Hangzhou | Zhejiang | Football at the 2022 Asian Games |
| Huadu Stadium | 13,395 | Guangzhou | Guangdong | Guangdong Mingtu F.C., Football at the 2010 Asian Games |
| Zhijiang City Sports Centre Stadium | 13,096 | Zhijiang | Hubei | |
| Jiamusi Stadium | 13,000 | Jiamusi | Heilongjiang | |
| Huaihua Stadium | 13,000 | Huaihua | Hunan | |
| Yuxi Plateau Sports Centre Stadium | 13,000 | Yuxi | Yunnan | |
| Sanbanqiao Stadium | 12,724 | Bijie | Guizhou | |
| Dujiangyan Phoenix Stadium | 12,700 | Dujiangyan | Sichuan | |
| Jincheng Stadium | 12,346 | Jincheng | Shanxi | |
| Tianchang City National Fitness Centre Stadium | 12,266 | Tianchang | Anhui | |
| Zengcheng Stadium | 12,000 | Guangzhou | Guangdong | Guangzhou Dandelion Alpha F.C. |
| Huangpu Stadium | 12,000 | Guangzhou | Guangdong | Football at the 2010 Asian Games |
| Changshou Stadium | 12,000 | Chongqing | Chongqing | |
| Zhongshan Stadium | 12,000 | Zhongshan | Guangdong | |
| Nanchang Institute of Technology Stadium | 12,000 | Nanchang | Jiangxi | |
| Ethylene Stadium | 12,000 | Daqing | Heilongjiang | |
| Xianning Sports Centre Stadium | 12,000 | Xianning | Hubei | |
| Changchun Sci-Tech University Stadium | 12,000 | Changchun | Jilin | |
| Minzu Tiyuchang Stadium | 12,000 | Tongren | Guizhou | |
| Ningguo Stadium | 12,000 | Xuancheng | Anhui | |
| Fangchang County Stadium | 12,000 | Wuhu | Anhui | |
| Kunming City Stadium | 12,000 | Kunming | Yunnan | |
| Dali Bai Autonomous Prefecture Stadium | 12,000 | Dali | Yunnan | |
| Yunfu City Stadium | 12,000 | Yunfu | Guangdong | |
| Dingnan Youth Football Training Centre Stadium | 12,000 | Ganzhou | Jiangxi | Ganzhou Ruishi F.C., Jiangxi Dingnan United F.C. |
| Zhejiang Normal University East Stadium | 11,349 | Jinhua | Zhejiang | Football at the 2022 Asian Games |
| Nanchang University Stadium | 11,000 | Nanchang | Jiangxi | |
| Meijiashan Stadium | 11,000 | Neijiang | Sichuan | |
| Shenyang Agricultural University Stadium | 10,586 | Shenyang | Liaoning | |
| Shijingshan Stadium | 10,540 | Beijing | Beijing | |
| Linping Sports Centre Stadium | 10,200 | Hangzhou | Zhejiang | Hangzhou Linping Wuyue F.C., Football at the 2022 Asian Games |
| Dongxing Stadium | 10,088 | Dongxing | Guangxi | |
| Xiaoshan Sports Centre Stadium | 10,118 | Hangzhou | Zhejiang | Football at the 2022 Asian Games |
| Shenzhen Youth Football Training Base Stadium | 10,000 | Shenzhen | Guangdong | Shenzhen 2028 F.C. |
| Daya Bay Stadium | 10,000 | Huizhou | Guangdong | |
| Rongchang County Stadium | 10,000 | Chongqing | Chongqing | |
| Bishan Stadium | 10,000 | Chongqing | Chongqing | |
| Zhangjiagang Stadium | 10,000 | Suzhou | Jiangsu | |
| Xihe Stadium | 10,000 | Longnan | Gansu | |
| Jiangnan University Stadium | 10,000 | Wuxi | Jiangsu | |
| Dongying Stadium | 10,000 | Dongying | Shandong | |
| Xundian County Stadium | 10,000 | Kunming | Yunnan | |
| Pinggu Stadium | 10,000 | Beijing | Beijing | |
| Haimen District Sports Centre Stadium | 10,000 | Nantong | Jiangsu | Nantong Haimen Codion F.C. |
| Yong'an Stadium | 10,000 | Yong'an | Fujian | |
| Hami Stadium | 10,000 | Hami | Xinjiang | |
| Libo County National Sports Activity Centre Stadium | 10,000 | Qiannan | Guizhou | |
| Quianguozhen Stadium | 10,000 | Songyuan | Jilin | |
| Hangzhou Dianzi University Stadium | 10,000 | Hangzhou | Zhejiang | |

== Chile ==
| Stadium | Capacity | City | Tenants |
|---|---|---|---|
| Estadio Nacional | 52,665 | Santiago | Chile Universidad de Chile |
| Monumental David Arellano | 49,347 | Santiago | Colo Colo |
| Ester Roa | 30,448 | Concepción | Deportes Concepción Universidad de Concepción Fernández Vial |
| Sausalito | 30,360 | Viña del Mar | Everton |
| Regional de Antofagasta | 28,178 | Antofagasta | Club de Deportes Antofagasta |
| Elías Figueroa Brander | 20,575 | Valparaíso | Santiago Wanderers |
| Santa Laura Universidad SEK | 19,000 | Santiago | Unión Española |
| Francisco Sánchez Rumoroso | 18,750 | Coquimbo | Coquimbo Unido |
| Germán Becker | 18,413 | Temuco | Deportes Temuco |
| La Portada | 18,243 | La Serena | La Serena |
| Fiscal de Talca | 16,000 | Talca | Rangers de Talca |
| San Carlos de Apoquindo | 14,118 | Santiago | Universidad Católica |
| El Teniente | 13,849 | Rancagua | O'Higgins |
| Tierra de Campeones | 13,171 | Iquique | Municipal Iquique |
| Zorros del Desierto | 12,346 | Calama | Cobreloa |
| Bicentenario Municipal de La Florida | 12,000 | Santiago | Audax Italiano |
| Nelson Oyarzún Arenas | 12,000 | Chillán | Ñublense |
| El Cobre | 12,000 | El Salvador | Cobresal |
| Estadio CAP | 10,500 | Talcahuano | Huachipato |
| Regional Chinquihue | 10,000 | Puerto Montt | Deportes Puerto Montt |
| Rubén Marcos Peralta | 10,000 | Osorno | Provincial Osorno |
| Municipal de San Felipe | 10,000 | San Felipe | Unión San Felipe |

== Colombia ==
| Stadium | Capacity | City | Tenants | Opened |
|---|---|---|---|---|
| Estadio Metropolitano Roberto Meléndez | 60,000 | Barranquilla | Junior; Colombia national football team | 1986 |
| Estadio Atanasio Girardot | 46,000 | Medellín | Atlético Nacional; Independiente Medellín | 1953 |
| Estadio Deportivo Cali | 44,000 | Palmira | Deportivo Cali | 2010 |
| Estadio General Santander | 42,901 | Cúcuta | Cúcuta Deportivo | 1948 |
| Estadio Olímpico Pascual Guerrero | 37,899 | Cali | América de Cali; Atlético; Boca Juniors de Cali | 1937 |
| Estadio Nemesio Camacho El Campín | 36,343 | Bogotá | Millonarios; Santa Fe | 1938 |
| Estadio Hernán Ramírez Villegas | 30,297 | Pereira | Deportivo Pereira | 1971 |
| Estadio Palogrande | 28,678 | Manizales | Once Caldas | 1994 |
| Estadio Manuel Murillo Toro | 28,100 | Ibagué | Deportes Tolima | 1955 |
| Estadio Américo Montanini | 28,000 | Bucaramanga | Atlético Bucaramanga | 1941 |
| Estadio Eduardo Santos (Note: Closed stadium.) (Note: Stadium declared as national monument.) | 22,000 | Santa Marta | | 1951 |
| Estadio Centenario | 20,716 | Armenia | Deportes Quindío | 1988 |
| Estadio La Independencia | 20,630 | Tunja | Boyacá Chicó; Patriotas | 1970 |
| Estadio Departamental Libertad | 20,000 | Pasto | Deportivo Pasto | 1954 |
| Estadio Olímpico Jaime Morón León | 16,068 | Cartagena | Real Cartagena | 1958 |
| Estadio Sierra Nevada | 16,000 | Santa Marta | Unión Magdalena | 2017 |
| Estadio Doce de Octubre | 16,000 | Tuluá | Inter Palmira U-20 | 1967 |
| Estadio Francisco Rivera Escobar | 15,300 | Palmira | Inter Palmira; Orsomarso | 1954 |
| Estadio Bello Horizonte - Rey Pelé | 15,000 | Villavicencio | Llaneros | 1958 |
| Estadio Luis Antonio Duque Peña | 15,000 | Girardot | | 1963 |
| Estadio Polideportivo Sur | 14,000 | Envigado | Envigado | 1992 |
| Estadio Alberto Grisales | 14,000 | Rionegro | | 1978 |
| Estadio Jaraguay | 12,000 | Montería | Jaguares | 2012 |
| Estadio Guillermo Plazas Alcid | 12,000 | Neiva | Atlético Huila | 1980 |
| Estadio Álvaro Gómez Hurtado | 12,000 | Floridablanca | | 1996 |
| Estadio Metropolitano Ciudad de Itagüí | 12,000 | Itagüí | Itagüí Leones | 1994 |
| Estadio Tulio Ospina | 12,000 | Bello | | 1978 |
| Estadio San José de Armenia | 12,000 | Armenia | | 1951 |
| Estadio Alfonso López Pumarejo | 12,000 | Bogotá | | 1938 |
| Estadio Armando Maestre Pavajeau | 11,500 | Valledupar | Alianza | 1974 |
| Estadio Daniel Villa Zapata | 10,400 | Barrancabermeja | | 1970 |
| Estadio Alberto Mora Mora | 10,000 | Pereira | | 1943 |
| Estadio Metropolitano de Techo | 10,000 | Bogotá | La Equidad; Fortaleza CEIF; Tigres; Bogotá | 1959 |
| Estadio Arturo Cumplido Sierra | 10,000 | Sincelejo | Águilas Doradas | |
| Estadio John Jairo Tréllez | 10,000 | Turbo | | 2011 |
| Estadio Luis Fernando Montoya | 10,000 | Caldas | | 2015 |
| Estadio Santiago de las Atalayas | 10,000 | Yopal | | 2006 |
| Estadio Armando Tuirán Paternina | 10,000 | Sahagún | | 2016 |

== Comoros ==
| Stadium | Capacity | City |
|---|---|---|
| Stade omnisports de Malouzini | 14,053 | Iconi |

== Congo ==
| Stadium | Capacity | City | Tenants |
|---|---|---|---|
| Stade Municipal de Kintélé | 60,000 | Brazzaville | Congo national football team |
| Stade Alphonse Massemba-Débat | 33,037 | Brazzaville | |
| Stade de Ouesso | 16,000 | Ouesso | |
| Stade municipal | 13,000 | Pointe-Noire | |
| Stade omnisport Marien Ngouabi d’Owando | 13,000 | Owando | |

== Costa Rica ==
| Stadium | Capacity | City | Tenants |
|---|---|---|---|
| Estadio Nacional de Costa Rica | 35,062 | San José | Costa Rica national football team |
| Estadio Ricardo Saprissa Aymá | 23,112 | San Juan de Tibás | Deportivo Saprissa |
| Estadio Alejandro Morera Soto | 17,895 | Alajuela | Liga Deportiva Alajuelense |
| Estadio José Rafael Fello Meza Ivankovich | 13,500 | Cartago | C.S. Cartaginés |

== Croatia ==
| Stadium | Capacity | Tenants |
|---|---|---|
| Stadion Maksimir | 38,079 | Croatia and Dinamo Zagreb |
| Stadion Poljud | 35,000 | Hajduk Split |
| Stadion Gradski vrt | 22,050 | Osijek |
| Opus Arena | 13,005 | NK Osijek |
| Stadion HNK Cibalia | 12,100 | Cibalia |
| Stadion Kranjčevićeva | 12,000 | Zagreb |
| Stadion Varteks | 10,800 | NK Varaždin |
| Stadion Kantrida | 10,500 | Rijeka |

== Cuba ==
| Stadium | Capacity | City | Tenants |
|---|---|---|---|
| Estadio Pedro Marrero | 30,000 | Havana | Cuba national football team |

== Curaçao ==
| Stadium | Capacity | Country | Tenants |
|---|---|---|---|
| Ergilio Hato Stadium | 10,000 | Curaçao | Curaçao national football team |

== Cyprus ==
| Stadium | Capacity | Tenants |
|---|---|---|
| GCP Stadium | 22,859 | AC Omonia Nicosia, APOEL F.C., Cyprus national football team |
| Makario Stadium | 16,000 | Digenis Morphou, Olympiakos Nicosia, Ethnikos Assia FC, Doxa Katokopias FC |
| Tsirion Stadium | 13,331 | Apollon Limassol FC, AEL Limassol, Aris Limassol FC |
| GCZ Stadium | 13,000 | Ermis Aradippou FC |
| Antonis Papadopoulos Stadium | 10,000 | Anorthosis Famagusta |

== Czech Republic ==
| Stadium | Capacity | Tenants |
|---|---|---|
| Eden Arena | 21,000 | Slavia Prague |
| Generali Arena | 20,854 | Czech Republic and AC Sparta Prague |
| Stadion Evžena Rosického | 19,032 | AC Sparta Prague B |
| Na Stínadlech | 18,221 | Teplice |
| Bazaly | 17,372 | Baník Ostrava |
| Městský stadion | 15,163 | FC Vítkovice |
| Andrův stadion | 12,541 | Sigma Olomouc |
| Stadion města Plzně | 12,500 | FC Viktoria Plzeň |
| Městský fotbalový stadion Srbská | 10,785 | Brno |

== Denmark ==
| Stadium | Capacity | Tenant |
|---|---|---|
| Parken Stadium | 38,065 | FC København and Denmark |
| Brøndby Stadium | 29,000 | Brøndby IF |
| Aarhus Stadium | 20,200 | Aarhus GF |
| Blue Water Arena | 17,442 | Esbjerg fB |
| Fionia Park | 15,790 | Odense Bk |
| Aalborg Stadion | 14,135 | Aalborg BK |
| MCH Arena | 12,055 | FC Midtjylland |
| Vejle Stadion | 11,060 | Vejle BK |
| Randers Stadium | 10,300 | Randers FC |
| Farum Park | 10,300 | FC Nordsjælland |

== Djibouti ==
| Stadium | Capacity | City | Tenants |
|---|---|---|---|
| El Hadj Hassan Gouled Aptidon Stadium | 20,000 | Djibouti City | Djibouti national football team |

== Dominican Republic ==
| Stadium | Capacity | City | Tenants |
|---|---|---|---|
| Estadio Olímpico Félix Sánchez | 27,000 | Santo Domingo | Dominican Republic national football team, Atlético Pantoja, Bauger FC |

== DR Congo ==
| Stadium | Capacity | City | Tenants |
|---|---|---|---|
| Stade des Martyrs | 80,000 | Kinshasa | National team |
| Stade Tata Raphaël | 70,000 | Kinshasa | DC Motema Pembe, AS Vita Club |
| Stade Lumumba | 30,000 | Kisangani | AS Nika, TS Malekesa, AS Makiso |
| Stade Kashala Bonzola | 25,000 | Mbuji-Mayi | SM Sanga Balende |
| Stade Cardinal Malula | 24,000 | Kinshasa | AS Dragons |
| Stade Joseph Kabila | 22,000 | Kindu | AS Maniema Union |
| Stade Frederic Kibassa Maliba | 20,000 | Lubumbashi | FC Saint Eloi Lupopo |
| Stade TP Mazembe | 18,500 | Lubumbashi | TP Mazembe, CS Don Bosco |
| Stade Joseph Kabila | 15,000 | Kalemie | FC Tanganyika, FC Etoile Jaune |
| Stade de la Concorde | 10,000 | Bukavu | OC Muungano |
| Stade des Jeunes | 10,000 | Kananga | US Tshinkunku, AS Saint-Luc |

== Ecuador ==
| Stadium | Capacity | City | Tenants |
|---|---|---|---|
| Estadio Monumental Isidro Romero Carbo | 59,283 | Guayaquil | Barcelona S.C. |
| Estadio Modelo Alberto Spencer Herrera | 42,000 | Guayaquil | 9 de Octubre F.C., C.S. Patria, C.D. Everest, Rocafuerte F.C., Panamá S.C. |
| Estadio Rodrigo Paz Delgado | 41,575 | Quito | Ecuador national football team, L.D.U. Quito |
| Estadio George Capwell | 40,020 | Guayaquil | C.S. Emelec |
| Estadio Olímpico Atahualpa | 35,742 | Quito | América de Quito, S.D. Quito, C.D. El Nacional, C.D. Universidad Católica del Ecuador |
| Estadio Reales Tamarindos | 21,000 | Portoviejo | L.D.U. Portoviejo |
| Estadio Jocay | 20,000 | Manta | Delfín S.C. |
| Estadio Gonzalo Pozo Ripalda | 18,799 | Quito | S.D. Aucas |
| Estadio Olímpico de Ibarra | 18,600 | Ibarra | Imbabura S.C. |
| Estadio Alejandro Serrano Aguilar | 16,540 | Cuenca | C.D. Cuenca, L.D.U. Cuenca |
| Estadio 9 de Mayo | 16,500 | Machala | C.D. Audaz Octubrino, Fuerza Amarilla S.C. |
| Estadio Bellavista | 16,467 | Ambato | Mushuc Runa S.C., C.S.D. Macará, C.D. Técnico Universitario |
| Estadio 7 de Octubre | 15,200 | Quevedo | C.D. Quevedo |
| Estadio La Cocha | 15,200 | Latacunga | S.D. Flamengo, C.D. Universidad Técnica de Cotopaxi |
| Estadio Federativo Reina del Cisne | 14,935 | Loja | L.D.U. Loja |
| Estadio Folke Anderson | 14,000 | Esmeraldas | C.D. Esmeraldas Petrolero, C.S.D. Juventus |
| Estadio Jorge Andrade | 14,000 | Azogues | Deportivo Azogues |
| Estadio Olímpico de Riobamba | 14,000 | Riobamba | C.D. Olmedo |
| Estadio Guillermo Albornoz | 12,000 | Cayambe | Cuniburo F.C. |
| Estadio Banco Guayaquil | 12,000 | Quito | C.S.D. Independiente del Valle |
| Estadio Etho Vega | 10,172 | Santo Domingo | C.D. ESPOLI |
| Estadio Christian Benítez Betancourt | 10,152 | Guayaquil | Guayaquil City F.C. |

== Egypt ==
| # | Stadium | Capacity | City | Tenants | Opened |
|---|---|---|---|---|---|
| 1 | New Administrative Capital Stadium | 93,940 | New Administrative Capital | Egypt football team | 2023 |
| 2 | Borg El-Arab Stadium | 86,000 | Borg El-Arab | Egypt football team & Al-Masry SC | 2007 |
| 3 | Cairo International Stadium | 75,000 | Cairo | Egypt football team & Al Ahly SC & Zamalek SC | 23 July 1960 |
| 4 | Egyptian Army Stadium | 45,000 | Suez | Petrojet FC | 2009 |
| 5 | Arab Contractors Stadium | 35,000 | Cairo | Mokawloon & FC Masr | 1979 |
| 6 | 30 June Stadium | 30,000 | Cairo | Wadi Degla SC | 2009 |
| 7 | Al-Salam Stadium | 30,000 | Cairo | El-Entag El-Harby | 2009 |
| 8 | Beni Ebeid Stadium | 30,000 | Bani Ebid | Beni Ebeid SC | |
| 9 | Ghazl El-Mahalla Stadium | 29,000 | El-Mahalla | Baladeyet El Mahalla & Ghazl El-Mahalla & Said El-Mahalla | |
| 10 | Cairo Military Academy Stadium | 28,500 | Cairo | For all teams | 1989 |
| 11 | Suez Stadium | 27,000 | Suez | Asmant El-Suweis & Petrojet FC | 1990 |
| 12 | El-Sekka El-Hadid Stadium | 25,000 | Cairo | El-Sekka El-Hadid | |
| 13 | Mokhtar El-Tetsh Stadium | 25,000 | Cairo | Al-Ahly | 1917 |
| 14 | Petro Sport Stadium | 25,000 | New Cairo | ENPPI | 2006 |
| 15 | Ismailia Stadium | 23,525 | Ismailia | Ismaily SC | 1934 |
| 16 | Haras El-Hodoud Stadium | 22,000 | Alexandria | Haras El-Hodood & El-Raja | |
| 17 | Port Said Stadium | 22,000 | Port Said | Al-Masry Club | 1955 |
| 19 | Suez Canal Stadium | 22,000 | Ismailia | | 2022 |
| 20 | Alexandria Stadium | 20,000 | Alexandria | Al-Ittihad & Smouha | 1929 |
| 21 | Fayoum Stadium | 20,000 | Fayoum | Misr El Makasa | |
| 22 | Sohag Stadium | 20,000 | Sohag | Sohag FC & El Gouna FC | 1930 |
| 23 | El Mansoura Stadium | 18,000 | El Mansoura | El Mansoura SC | 1962 |
| 24 | Aluminium Stadium | 16,000 | Nag Hammadi | Aluminium Nag Hammâdi | |
| 25 | Izz al-Din Yacoub Stadium | 15,000 | Alexandria | | |
| 26 | Asiut University Stadium | 12,000 | Asyut | Asyut Petroleum | |
| 27 | Aswan Stadium | 11,000 | Aswan | Aswan SC | 2014 |
| 28 | Bani Sweif Stadium | 10,000 | Bani Sweif | Telephonat Bani Sweif | |
| 29 | Desouk Stadium | 10,000 | Desouk | Desouk SC | 1 January 1976 |
| 30 | El-Gouna Stadium | 10,000 | El-Gouna | El Gouna FC | 2009 |
| 31 | Arba’een Sporting Stadium | 10,000 | Asyut | | |

== El Salvador ==
| Stadium | Capacity | City | Tenants |
|---|---|---|---|
| Estadio Cuscatlán | 44,836 | San Salvador | El Salvador national football team, Alianza F.C., C.D. Atlético Marte |
| Estadio Óscar Quiteño | 17,500 | Santa Ana | C.D. FAS |
| Estadio Correcaminos | 12,000 | San Francisco Gotera | C.D. Chagüite, C.D. Fuerte San Francisco |
| Estadio Juan Francisco Barraza | 10,000 | San Miguel | C.D. Águila |
| Estadio Las Delicias | 10,000 | Santa Tecla | Santa Tecla F.C. |

== Equatorial Guinea ==
| Stadium | Capacity | City | Tenants |
|---|---|---|---|
| Estadio de Bata | 35,700 | Bata | Equatorial Guinea national football team |
| Estadio de Malabo | 15,250 | Malabo | CD Elá Nguema, Atlético Semu, Deportivo Unidad, The Panthers FC, Leones Vegetarianos |
| Estadio de Mongomo | 10,000 | Mongomo | Deportivo Mongomo |

== Estonia ==
| Stadium | Capacity | Tenants |
|---|---|---|
| A. Le Coq Arena | 14,336 | Estonia, FC Flora Tallinn |
| Kalevi Keskstaadion | 12,000 | JK Kalev Tallinn |

== Eswatini ==
| Stadium | Capacity | City | Tenants |
|---|---|---|---|
| Somhlolo National Stadium | 20,000 | Lobamba | Eswatini national football team |

== Ethiopia ==
| Stadium | Capacity | City | Tenants |
|---|---|---|---|
| Bahir Dar Stadium | 60,000 | Bahir Dar | Bahir Dar Kenema, National team |
| Tigray Stadium | 60,000 | Mekelle | Mekelle City FC, Dedebit FC, Guna Trading FC, Trans Ethiopia |
| Hawassa Kenema Stadium | 60,000 | Hawassa | Hawassa City |
| Addis Ababa Stadium | 35,000 | Addis Ababa | National team, Saint George, Ethiopian Coffee, Defence Force |
| Woldiya Stadium | 25,155 | Weldiya | Woldia |
| Mekelle University Arid Stadium | 20,000 | Mekelle | |
| Dire Dawa Stadium | 18,000 | Dire Dawa | Dire Dawa City |
| Hawassa University Stadium | 15,000 | Hawassa | Hawassa CIty F.C |
| Wonji Stadium | 14,000 | Wenji | Muger Cement, Wonji Sugar |
| Abebe Bikila Stadium | 13,000 | Addis Ababa | Dedebit F.C. |
| Addis Ababa Sports Complex Stadium | 10,000 | Addis Ababa | |
| Training Ground | 10,000 | Addis Ababa | |
| Harrar Bira Stadium | 10,000 | Harar | Harrar Beer Bottling F.C. |

== Fiji ==
| Stadium | Capacity | City | Tenants |
|---|---|---|---|
| HFC Bank Stadium | 15,000 | Suva | Suva F.C. |
| Churchill Park | 10,000 | Lautoka | Lautoka F.C. |
| Subrail Park | 10,000 | Labasa | Dreketi F.C., Labasa F.C. |

== Finland ==
| Stadium | Capacity | Tenants |
|---|---|---|
| Helsinki Olympic Stadium | 40,000 | Finland |
| Ratina Stadion | 17,000 | Tampere United |
| Lahden Stadion | 14,500 | FC Lahti |
| Keskusurheilukenttä Stadion | 14,500 | Kouvolan Sudet |
| Pori Stadium | 12,300 | FC Jazz |
| Raatti Stadium | 12,000 | OLS/Tervarit |
| Finnair Stadium | 10,770 | HJK Helsinki |

== France ==
| Stadium | Capacity | City | Region | Tenants | Opened |
|---|---|---|---|---|---|
| Stade de France | 81,338 | Paris (Saint-Denis) | Île-de-France | France national football team; France national rugby union team | 1998 |
| Stade Vélodrome | 67,394 | Marseille | Provence-Alpes-Côte d'Azur | Olympique de Marseille | 1937 |
| Parc Olympique Lyonnais | 59,186 | Lyon (Décines-Charpieu) | Auvergne-Rhône-Alpes | Olympique Lyonnais | 2016 |
| Stade Pierre-Mauroy | 50,157 | Lille (Villeneuve-d'Ascq) | Hauts-de-France | Lille OSC | 2012 |
| Parc des Princes | 47,929 | Paris | Île-de-France | Paris Saint-Germain FC | 1972 |
| Matmut Atlantique | 42,115 | Bordeaux | Nouvelle-Aquitaine | FC Girondins de Bordeaux | 2015 |
| Stade Geoffroy-Guichard | 41,965 | Saint-Étienne | Auvergne-Rhône-Alpes | AS Saint-Étienne | 1931 |
| Stade Bollaert-Delelis | 38,223 | Lens | Hauts-de-France | RC Lens | 1932 |
| Stade de la Beaujoire | 37,473 | Nantes | Pays de la Loire | FC Nantes | 1984 |
| Allianz Riviera | 35,624 | Nice | Provence-Alpes-Côte d'Azur | OGC Nice | 2013 |
| Stade Chaban-Delmas | 34,462 | Bordeaux | Nouvelle-Aquitaine | Union Bordeaux Bègles | 1938 |
| Stadium Municipal | 33,150 | Toulouse | Occitanie | Toulouse FC | 1937 |
| Stade de la Mosson | 32,939 | Montpellier | Occitanie | Montpellier HSC | 1972 |
| Stade de la Meinau | 32,300 | Strasbourg | Grand Est | RC Strasbourg | 1914 |
| Stade Saint-Symphorien | 30,000 | Metz | Grand Est | FC Metz | 1923 |
| Roazhon Park | 29,778 | Rennes | Brittany | Stade Rennais FC | 1912 |
| Stade Océane | 25,178 | Le Havre | Normandy | Le Havre AC | 2012 |
| MMArena | 25,064 | Le Mans | Pays de la Loire | Le Mans UC | 2011 |
| Stade du Hainaut | 24,926 | Valenciennes | Hauts-de-France | Valenciennes FC | 2011 |
| Stade Louis Dugauguez | 23,189 | Sedan | Grand Est | Club Sportif Sedan Ardennes | 2000 |
| Stade Auguste-Delaune | 21,684 | Reims | Grand Est | Stade Reims | 1935 |
| Stade Michel d'Ornano | 21,500 | Caen | Normandy | Stade Malherbe Caen | 1993 |
| Stade de l'Aube | 20,400 | Troyes | Grand Est | Troyes AC | 1924 |
| Stade Marcel Picot | 20,087 | Tomblaine | Grand Est | AS Nancy | 1926 |
| Stade des Alpes | 20,068 | Grenoble | Auvergne-Rhône-Alpes | Grenoble Foot 38, FC Grenoble Rugby | 2008 |
| Stade Auguste Bonal | 20,025 | Montbéliard | Bourgogne-Franche-Comté | FC Sochaux-Montbéliard | 2000 |
| Stade Sébastien Charléty | 20,000 | Paris | Île-de-France | Paris FC | 1938 |

| Stadium | Capacity | City | Region | Tenants | Sport | Opened |
|---|---|---|---|---|---|---|
| Stade Raymond Kopa | 19,800 | Angers | Ville d'Angers | Angers SCO | Football | 1912 (2022) |
| Stade Charléty | 19,151 | Paris | Ville de Paris | Paris 13 Atletico; Paris FC; Paris Université Club | Football; Athletics | 1939 (1994) |
| Stade de Roudourou | 19,060 (Note: Le The official site states an official capacity of 18700 places at Stade de Roudourou.) | Guingamp | Ville de Guingamp | EA Guingamp | Football | 1990 (2018) |
| Stade Robert Bobin | 18,850 | Bondoufle | Département de l'Essonne | Paris FC (women) | Football | 1994 (2022) |
| Stadium Lille Métropole | 18,500 (Note: The authorized capacity for football matches at the Stadium Lille Métropole in the 2000s was up to 18185 places.) | Villeneuve-d'Ascq (Lille) | Métropole européenne de Lille | Olympique Marcquois Rugby | Football; Rugby union | 1975 (2010) |
| Stade du Moustoir | 18,500 | Lorient | Ville de Lorient | FC Lorient | Football | 1959 (2010) |
| Stade Gaston Gérard | 18,376 | Dijon | Ville de Dijon | Dijon FCO | Football | 1934 (2017) |
| Stade de l'Abbé-Deschamps | 17,924 | Auxerre | Auxerre | AJ Auxerre | Football | 1918 (2015) |
| Stade Gaston-Petit | 17,072 | Châteauroux | Ville de Châteauroux | LB Châteauroux | Football | 1962 (1997) |
| Stade Jules Deschaseaux | 16,382 | Le Havre | Ville du Havre | Le Havre AC | Rugby union | 1931 (1999) |
| Stade Armand-Cesari | 16,048 | Furiani (Bastia) | Communauté d'agglomération de Bastia | SC Bastia | Football | 1932 (2018) |
| Stade Marcel-Deflandre | 16,000 (16,500) | La Rochelle | Ville de La Rochelle | Stade Rochelais | Rugby union | 1926 (2023) |
| Parc des sports | 15,714 | Annecy | Ville d'Annecy | FC Annecy | Football | 1964 (2022) |
| Stade Francis-Le Blé | 15,220 | Brest | Ville de Brest | Stade brestois 29 | Football | 1922 (2010) |
| Stade Jean Laville | 14,753 | Gueugnon | Ville de Gueugnon | FC Gueugnon | Football | 1939 (2003) |
| Stade Georges-Pompidou | 14,380 | Valence | Ville de Valence | ASOA Valence; ROC La Voulte-Valence | Football; Rugby union | 1974 |
| Stade Gabriel-Montpied | 13,700 (17,735) | Clermont-Ferrand | Ville de Clermont-Ferrand | Clermont Foot 63 | Football | 1995 (2025) |
| Stade municipal de Beaublanc | 13,182 | Limoges | Ville de Limoges | USA Limoges | Rugby union | 1924 (2018) |
| Stade de la Licorne | 12,999 | Amiens | Communauté d'agglomération Amiens Métropole | Amiens SC | Football | 1999 |
| Stade Pierre-Antoine | 12,550 | Castres | Ville de Castres | Castres olympique | Football | 1907 (2017) |
| Stade Parsemain | 12,500 | Fos-sur-Mer (Istres) | Istres-Ouest-Provence | FC Istres; ES Fos-Sur-Mer | Football | 2005 |
| Stade de l'Épopée | 12,432 | Calais | Ville de Calais | RC Calais | Football | 2008 |
| Stade Dominique Duvauchelle | 12,150 | Créteil (Paris) | Métropole du Grand Paris | US Créteil-Lusitanos | Football | 1983 (2004) |
| Stade François Coty | 12,096 | Ajaccio | Ajaccio | AC Ajaccio | Football | 1969 (2012) |
| Stade Robert Diochon | 12,018 | Le Petit-Quevilly (Rouen) | Métropole Rouen Normandie | FC Rouen; US Quevilly-Rouen; Rouen Normandie Rugby | Football; Rugby union | 1914 (2022) |
| Stade Michel-Amand | 12,000 | Poitiers | Grand Poitiers | Stade Poitevin FC | Football | 1989 (1995) |
| Stadium Vénissieux | 11,805 | Vénissieux (Lyon) | Ville de Lyon | | Football | 2011 |
| Stade de la Rabine | 11,415 | Vannes | Ville de Vannes | Vannes OC; RC Vannes | Football; Rugby union | 1959 (2022) |
| Stade Francis Le Basser | 11,107 | Laval | Laval Agglomération | Stade Lavallois | Football | 1971 (2001) |
| Stade Léo Lagrange | 10,307 | Besançon | Ville de Besançon | Racing Besançon; Besançon Football | Football | 1939 (2005) |
| Stade Pierre Brisson | 10,178 | Beauvais | Ville de Beauvais | AS Beauvais Oise; Beauvais RC | Football; Rugby union | 1935 (1999) |
| Stade de la Vallée du Cher | 10,128 | Tours | Ville de Tours | Tours FC | Football | 1978 (2011) |

== French Polynesia ==
| Stadium | Capacity | City |
|---|---|---|
| Stade Pater Te Hono Nui | 11,700 | Pīraʻe |
| Stade Hamuta | 10,000 | Papeete |

== Gabon ==
| Stadium | Capacity | City | Tenants |
|---|---|---|---|
| Stade d'Angondjé | 40,000 | Libreville | Gabon national football team |
| Stade de Franceville | 22,000 | Franceville | |
| Stade d'Oyem | 20,500 | Oyem | |
| Stade de Port-Gentil | 20,000 | Port-Gentil | |

== Gambia ==
| Stadium | Capacity | City | Tenants |
|---|---|---|---|
| Independence Stadium | 20,000 | Bakau | Gambia national football team |

== Georgia ==
| Stadium | Capacity | City | Home team(s) | Opened | UEFA Rank |
|---|---|---|---|---|---|
| Boris Paitchadze Dinamo Arena | 54,549 | Tbilisi | Georgia national football team, Georgia national rugby union team, FC Dinamo Tbilisi | 1976 | 4/4 stars |
| Mikheil Meskhi Stadium | 27,670 | Tbilisi | FC Locomotive Tbilisi | 1952 | 3/3 stars |
| Adjarabet Arena | 20,000 | Batumi | FC Dinamo Batumi | 2020 | 4/4 stars |
| Ramaz Shengelia Stadium | 15,000 | Kutaisi | FC Torpedo Kutaisi | 1956 | 2/2 stars |

== Germany ==
| Stadium | Capacity | City | State | Tenants | Opened | Notes |
|---|---|---|---|---|---|---|
| Westfalenstadion | 81,365 | Dortmund | North Rhine-Westphalia | Borussia Dortmund | 1974 | UEFA Category 4 stadium |
| Allianz Arena | 75,024 | Munich | Bavaria | FC Bayern Munich | 2005 | UEFA Category 4 stadium |
| Olympiastadion Berlin | 74,475 | Berlin | Berlin | Hertha BSC | 1936 | UEFA Category 4 stadium |
| Olympiastadion Munich | 63,540 | Munich | Bavaria | Türkgücü Munich (most matches) | 1972 | |
| Veltins-Arena | 62,271 | Gelsenkirchen | North Rhine-Westphalia | FC Schalke 04 | 2001 | UEFA Category 4 stadium |
| MHPArena | 60,058 | Stuttgart | Baden-Württemberg | VfB Stuttgart | 1933 | UEFA Category 4 stadium |
| Deutsche Bank Park | 58,000 | Frankfurt | Hesse | Eintracht Frankfurt | 1925 | |
| Volksparkstadion | 57,030 | Hamburg | Hamburg | Hamburger SV | 1953 | UEFA Category 4 stadium |
| Merkur Spiel-Arena | 54,600 | Düsseldorf | North Rhine-Westphalia | Fortuna Düsseldorf | 2005 | |
| Borussia-Park | 54,022 | Mönchengladbach | North Rhine-Westphalia | Borussia Mönchengladbach | 2004 | |
| Max-Morlock-Stadion | 50,000 | Nuremberg | Bavaria | 1. FC Nürnberg | 1928 | |
| RheinEnergieStadion | 49,968 | Cologne | North Rhine-Westphalia | 1. FC Köln | 1923 | |
| Fritz-Walter-Stadion | 49,780 | Kaiserslautern | Rhineland-Palatinate | 1. FC Kaiserslautern | 1920 | |
| Heinz-von-Heiden-Arena | 49,000 | Hannover | Lower Saxony | Hannover 96 | 1954 | |
| Red Bull Arena | 47,069 | Leipzig | Saxony | RB Leipzig | 2004 | UEFA Category 4 stadium |
| Wohninvest Weserstadion | 42,358 | Bremen | Bremen | SV Werder Bremen | 1947 | |
| Europa-Park Stadion | 34,700 | Freiburg im Breisgau | Baden-Württemberg | SC Freiburg | 2021 | |
| Wildparkstadion | 34,140 | Karlsruhe | Baden-Württemberg | Karlsruher SC | 1955 | |
| Mewa Arena | 34,034 | Mainz | Rhineland-Palatinate | 1. FSV Mainz 05 | 2011 | |
| Tivoli | 32,960 | Aachen | North Rhine-Westphalia | Alemannia Aachen | 2009 | |
| Rudolf-Harbig-Stadion | 32,066 | Dresden | Saxony | Dynamo Dresden | 1923 | |
| Stadion am Schloss Strünkede | 32,000 | Herne | North Rhine-Westphalia | SC Westfalia Herne | 1910 | |
| Schauinsland-Reisen-Arena | 31,514 | Duisburg | North Rhine-Westphalia | MSV Duisburg | 2004 | |
| WWK Arena | 30,660 | Augsburg | Bavaria | FC Augsburg | 2009 | |
| BayArena | 30,210 | Leverkusen | North Rhine-Westphalia | Bayer 04 Leverkusen | 1958 | |
| PreZero Arena | 30,150 | Sinsheim | Baden-Württemberg | TSG 1899 Hoffenheim | 2009 | |
| Avnet Arena | 30,098 | Magdeburg | Saxony-Anhalt | 1. FC Magdeburg | 2006 | |
| Volkswagen Arena | 30,000 | Wolfsburg | Lower Saxony | VfL Wolfsburg | 2002 | |
| Millerntor-Stadion | 29,546 | Hamburg | Hamburg | FC St.Pauli | 1963 | |
| Ostseestadion | 29,000 | Rostock | Mecklenburg-Vorpommern | F.C. Hansa Rostock | 1954 | |
| Vonovia Ruhrstadion | 27,599 | Bochum | North Rhine-Westphalia | VfL Bochum | 1911 | |
| SchücoArena | 27,300 | Bielefeld | North Rhine-Westphalia | Arminia Bielefeld | 1926 | |
| Carl-Benz-Stadion | 26,022 | Mannheim | Baden-Württemberg | SV Waldhof Mannheim | 1994 | |
| Dreisamstadion | 24,000 | Freiburg im Breisgau | Baden-Württemberg | Freiburg B | 1953 | |
| Ellenfeldstadion | 23,400 | Neunkirchen | Saarland | Borussia Neunkirchen | 1912 | |
| Eintracht-Stadion | 23,325 | Braunschweig | Lower Saxony | Eintracht Braunschweig | 1923 | |
| Stadion am Zoo | 23,067 | Wuppertal | North Rhine-Westphalia | Wuppertaler SV | 1924 | |
| Stadion der Freundschaft | 22,528 | Cottbus | Brandenburg | Energie Cottbus | 1930 | |
| Stadion An der Alten Försterei | 22,012 | Berlin | Berlin | 1. FC Union Berlin | 1966 | |
| Hans-Walter-Wild-Stadion | 21,500 | Bayreuth | Bavaria | SpVgg Bayreuth | 1967 | |
| Niederrheinstadion | 21,318 | Oberhausen | North Rhine-Westphalia | Rot-Weiß Oberhausen | 1926 | |
| Stadion an der Hafenstraße | 20,650 | Essen | North Rhine-Westphalia | Rot-Weiss Essen | 2012 | |
| Stadion am Bieberer Berg | 20,500 | Offenbach am Main | Hesse | Kickers Offenbach | 2012 | |
| Grotenburg-Stadion | 20,200 | Krefeld | North Rhine-Westphalia | KFC Uerdingen 05 | 1927 | |
| Paul-Greifzu-Stadion | 20,000 | Dessau | Saxony-Anhalt | SV Dessau 05 | 1952 | |

| Stadium | Capacity | City | Tenants |
|---|---|---|---|
| Friedrich-Ludwig-Jahn-Stadion | 19,708 | Berlin | Berlin Thunder, VSG Altglienicke |
| Donaustadion | 19,500 | Ulm | SSV Ulm |
| Merck-Stadion am Böllenfalltor | 17,810 | Darmstadt | Darmstadt 98 |
| Stadion an der Bremer Brücke | 16,667 | Osnabrück | VfL Osnabrück |
| Sportpark Ronhof | Thomas Sommer | 16,626 | Fürth | Greuther Fürth |
| Hänsch-Arena | 16,500 | Meppen | SV Meppen |
| Ischelandstadion | 16,500 | Hagen | SSV Hagen |
| Ludwigsparkstadion | 16,003 | Saarbrücken | 1. FC Saarbrücken |
| Erzgebirgsstadion | 15,711 | Aue-Bad Schlema | Erzgebirge Aue |
| BWT-Stadion am Hardtwald | 15,414 | Sandhausen | SV Sandhausen |
| Jahnstadion Regensburg | 15,210 | Regensburg | Jahn Regensburg |
| LEUNA-CHEMIE-STADION | 15,057 | Halle | Hallescher FC |
| Uhlsport Park | 15,053 | Unterhaching | Munich Ravens, SpVgg Unterhaching |
| Holstein-Stadion | 15,034 | Kiel | Holstein Kiel |
| Voith-Arena | 15,001 | Heidenheim | 1. FC Heidenheim |
| Grünwalder Stadion | 15,000 | Munich | 1860 Munich |
| Home Deluxe Arena | 15,000 | Paderborn | SC Paderborn |
| Audi Sportpark | 15,001 | Ingolstadt | FC Ingolstadt |
| BRITA-Arena | 12,566 | Wiesbaden | Wehen Wiesbaden |
| PSD Bank Arena | 12,542 | Frankfurt am Main | Frankfurt Galaxy, Frankfurt Universe, FSV Frankfurt |
| Stadion Pennenfeld | 12,000 | Bonn | Bonn Gamecocks |
| Südstadion | 11,748 | Cologne | Cologne Centurions, SC Fortuna Köln |
| Gazi-Stadion auf der Waldau | 11,410 | Stuttgart | Stuttgarter Kickers, Stuttgart Scorpions, Stuttgart Surge, VfB Stuttgart II |
| GGZ-Arena Zwickau | 10,049 | Zwickau | FSV Zwickau |
| Sportpark Höhenberg | 10,001 | Cologne | Viktoria Köln |

== Ghana ==
| Stadium | Capacity | Tenants |
|---|---|---|
| Baba Yara stadium | 40,500 | Asante Kotoko; King Faisal Babes |
| Ohene Djan Stadium | 40,000 | Hearts of Oak; Ghana national football team Great Olympics |
| Len Clay Stadium | 20,000 | Ashanti Gold SC |
| Tamale Stadium | 21,000 | Real Tamale United |
| Essipong Stadium | 20,000 | Sekondi Wise Fighters |
| Robert Mensah Sports Stadium | 15,000 | Ebusua Dwarfs |
| Gyandu Park | 15,000 | Sekondi Hasaacas FC |
| Abrankese Stadium | 12,000 | Kessben F.C. |
| UG Sports Stadium | 10,000 | |

== Greece ==
| Stadium | Capacity | Tenants |
|---|---|---|
| Athens Olympic Stadium | 74,767 | Greece, Panathinaikos |
| Karaiskakis Stadium | 33,334 | Olympiacos |
| Agia Sophia Stadium | 32,500 | AEK Athens |
| Toumba Stadium | 28,701 | PAOK |
| Kaftanzoglio Stadium | 28,028 | Iraklis |
| Pankritio Stadium | 26,400 | OFI |
| Pampeloponnisiako Stadium | 23,588 | none |
| Kleanthis Vikelidis Stadium | 22,800 | Aris |
| Panthessaliko Stadium | 22,700 | Volos |
| Leoforos Alexandras Stadium | 16,620 | A.E. Kifisia |
| AEL FC Arena | 16,118 | AEL |
| Trikala Municipal Stadium | 15.000 | Trikala |
| Alcazar Stadium | 13.108 | none |
| Georgios Kamaras Stadium | 14,200 | Apollon Smyrnis |
| Anthi Karagianni Stadium | 14,000 | Kavala |
| Volos Municipal Stadium | 12,000 | Olympiacos Volos |
| Nea Smyrni Stadium | 11,700 | Panionios |
| Kostas Davourlis Stadium | 11,321 | Panachaiki |
| Veria Stadium | 11,000 | Veria |
| Serres Municipal Stadium | 10,000 | Panserraikos |
| Peristeri Stadium | 10,000 | Atromitos |

== Guatemala ==
| Stadium | Capacity | Tenants |
|---|---|---|
| Estadio Doroteo Guamuch Flores | 26,000 | Comunicaciones F.C. |
| Estadio Israel Barrios | 20,000 | Deportivo Coatepeque |
| Estadio Verapaz | 15,000 | Cobán Imperial |
| Estadio Cementos Progreso | 14,022 | Aurora F.C. |
| Estadio Mario Camposeco | 11,220 | C.S.D. Xelajú MC |
| Estadio Carlos Salazar Hijo | 10,000 | C.D. Suchitepéquez |
| Estadio Pensativo | 10,000 | Antigua GFC |

== Guinea ==
| Stadium | Capacity | City | Tenants |
|---|---|---|---|
| General Lansana Conté Stadium | 50,000 | Conakry | Guinea national football team |
| Stade du 28 Septembre | 25,000 | Conakry | |

== Guinea-Bissau ==
| Stadium | Capacity | City |
|---|---|---|
| Estádio 24 de Setembro | 20,000 | Bissau |
| Estádio Lino Correia | 12,000 | Bissau |

== Guyana ==
| Stadium | Capacity | City | Tenants | Other uses |
|---|---|---|---|---|
| Providence Stadium | 20,000 | Providence | Guyana Amazon Warriors | Cricket |
| Georgetown Cricket Club Ground | 10,000 | Georgetown | | Cricket |

== Haiti ==
| Stadium | Capacity | Country | Tenants |
|---|---|---|---|
| Stade Sylvio Cator | 20,000 | Haiti | Haiti national football team |

== Honduras ==
| Stadium | Capacity | Tenants |
|---|---|---|
| Estadio Olímpico Metropolitano | 45,000 | Honduras national football team |
| Estadio Nacional Chelato Uclés | 36,000 | Motagua / Olimpia |
| Estadio Nilmo Edwards | 25,000 | Victoria / Vida |
| Estadio Francisco Morazán | 21,000 | Real España |
| Estadio Juan Ramón Brevé Vargas | 20,000 | Juticalpa |
| Estadio Yankel Rosenthal | 15,000 | Marathón |
| Estadio Excélsior | 10,000 | Platense |
| Estadio Carlos Miranda | 10,000 | Comayagua |

== Hong Kong ==
| Stadium | Capacity | Tenants |
|---|---|---|
| Kai Tak Sports Park | 50,000 | Hong Kong national football team |
| Hong Kong Stadium | 40,000 | Hong Kong national football team |
| Siu Sai Wan Sports Ground | 11,981 | |

== Hungary ==
| Stadium | Capacity | Tenants |
|---|---|---|
| Puskás Aréna | 67,215 | Hungary national football team |
| Debrecen Stadion | 20,340 | Debreceni VSC |
| Stadion ETO | 20,000 | Győri ETO FC |
| Stadion Sóstói | 20,000 | FC Fehérvár |
| Stadion Albert Flórián | 18,100 | Ferencvárosi TC |
| Stadion Rudolf Illovszky | 18,000 | Vasas SC |
| Városi Stadion | 16,500 | Nyíregyháza Spartacus |
| Városi Stadion | 15,500 | FC Tatabánya |
| DVTK Stadion | 15,325 | Diósgyőri VTK |
| Dunaferr Arena | 15,000 | Dunaújváros FC |
| Szusza Ferenc Stadium | 13,501 | Újpest FC |
| Stadion Hidegkuti Nándor | 12,700 | MTK Hungária |
| ZTE Arena | 12,500 | Zalaegerszegi TE |
| Stadion Rohonci Ut | 12,000 | Szombathelyi Haladás |
| Révesz Géza Stadion | 10,500 | BFC Siófok |
| Stadion Városi Vác | 10,500 | Vác-Újbuda LTC |
| Stadion Budai II. Laszló | 10,000 | Rákospalotai EAC |

== India ==
| Stadium | Capacity | City | State | Tenants | Game(s) |
|---|---|---|---|---|---|
| Vivekananda Yuba Bharati Krirangan | 85,000 | Kolkata | West Bengal | Indian football team, East Bengal FC, Mohammedan SC, Mohun Bagan Super Giant | Athletics, Football |
| Jawaharlal Nehru Stadium | 60,254 | Delhi | Delhi NCR | Indian Football Team; Delhi Dynamos FC (2014–2019); Punjab FC; SC Delhi | Athletics, Football |
| EMS Stadium | 50,000 | Kozhikode | Kerala | | Football |
| Greenfield International Stadium | 50,000 | Thiruvananthapuram | Kerala | Indian Football Team (2016–present); Indian Cricket Team (2017–present) Kerala cricket team (2017–present) | Sports complex |
| KD Singh Babu Stadium | 50,000 | Lucknow | Uttar Pradesh | Uttar Pradesh cricket team | Cricket |
| Yashwant Stadium | 50,000 | Nagpur | Maharashtra | | Football |
| DY Patil Stadium | 45,300 | Navi Mumbai | Maharashtra | D Y Patil T20 | Cricket, Football |
| Barabati Stadium | 45,000 | Cuttack | Odisha | Odisha Cricket Team (1958–present); Odisha Women's Cricket Team (1958–present); Odisha Football Team (1958–present); Odisha Women's Football Team (1958–present) | Cricket |
| Jawaharlal Nehru Stadium | 40,000 | Kochi | Kerala | Indian Football Team (1997–present); Indian Cricket Team (1998–present); Chirag United Club Kerala (2012); Kochi Tuskers Kerala (2010–2011); Kerala Strikers (2011–present); Kerala Blasters F.C. (2014–present) | Cricket, Football |
| Lal Bahadur Shastri Stadium | 40,000 | Kollam | Kerala | | Athletics, Football |
| East Bengal Ground | 40,000 | Kolkata | West Bengal | SC East Bengal | Football |
| Chennai Jawaharlal Nehru Stadium | 40,000 | Chennai | Tamil Nadu | Indian Bank Recreational Club, Chennaiyin F.C. | Athletics, Football |
| JRD Tata Sports Complex Stadium | 40,000 | Jamshedpur | Jharkhand | Jamshedpur FC, Tata Football Academy | Athletics, Football |
| Kanchenjunga Stadium | 40,000 | Siliguri | West Bengal | local football teams | Cricket; Football |
| Birsa Munda Athletics Stadium | 35,000 | Ranchi | Jharkhand | | Athletics |
| Ambedkar Stadium | 35,000 | Delhi | Delhi NCR | ONGC Football Club | Football |
| Jawaharlal Nehru Stadium | 30,000 | Coimbatore | Tamil Nadu | Chennai City FC, Coimbatore District football association | Football |
| GMC Balayogi Athletic Stadium | 30,000 | Hyderabad | Telangana | Hyderabad FC | Athletics, Football |
| Khuman Lampak Main Stadium | 30,000 | Imphal | Manipur | local football teams and athletics | Football |
| Dadaji Kondadev Stadium | 30,000 | Thane | Maharashtra | local football teams | Football |
| Baichung Stadium | 30,000 | Namchi | Sikkim | | Football |
| Bakhshi Stadium | 30,000 | Srinagar | Jammu and Kashmir | JK XI | Football |
| Guru Nanak Stadium | 30,000 | Ludhiana | Punjab | | Football |
| Paljor Stadium | 30,000 | Gangtok | Sikkim | United Sikkim F.C. | Football |
| Guru Gobind Singh Stadium | 30,000 | Nanded | Maharashtra | Maharashtra cricket team | Cricket |
| Chandrasekharan Nair Stadium | 25,000 | Thiruvananthapuram | Kerala | | Athletics, Football |
| Sree Kanteerava Stadium | 25,000 | Bengaluru | Karnataka | Bengaluru FC | Athletics, Football |
| Mohun Bagan Ground | 22,000 | Kolkata | West Bengal | Mohun Bagan AC | Football |
| Guru Gobind Singh Stadium | 22,000 | Jalandhar | Punjab | local football teams | Football |
| Satindra Mohan Dev Stadium | 22,000 | Silchar | Assam | local football team | Football |
| Indira Gandhi Athletic Stadium | 21,600 | Guwahati | Assam | NorthEast United FC, local football teams and athletics | Athletics, Football |
| Indira Gandhi Stadium, Kohima | 20,000 | Kohima | Nagaland | | Football |
| Anna Stadium | 20,000 | Tiruchirappalli | Tamil Nadu | | Sports Complex |
| Kalyani Stadium | 20,000 | Kalyani | West Bengal | | Football |
| EKA Arena | 20,000 | Ahmedabad | Gujarat | Gujarat football team | multi-purpose stadium |
| Mangala Stadium | 20,000 | Mangalore | Karnataka | Mangalore United | Football |
| Lajwanti Stadium | 20,000 | Hoshiarpur | Punjab | | Football |
| TT Nagar Stadium | 20,000 | Bhopal | Madhya Pradesh | | Football |
| Visvesvaraya Stadium | 20,000 | Mandya | Karnataka | | Football |
| Patliputra Sports Complex | 20,000 | Patna | Bihar | local football teams | Football |
| NTR Stadium | 20,000 | Gudivada | Andhra Pradesh | | Multi-purpose stadium |
| Fatorda Stadium | 19,000 | Margao | Goa | Dempo Sports Club, Salgaocar Sports Club, Sporting Clube de Goa, FC Goa | Football |
| Chhatrapati Shahu Stadium | 18,000 | Kolhapur | Maharashtra | | Athletics, Football |
| Rabindra Sarobar Stadium | 18,000 | Kolkata | West Bengal | Tollygunge Agragami | Athletics, Football |
| Chhatrasal Stadium | 16,000 | Delhi | Delhi NCR | | Sports complex |
| Vidyasagar Krirangan | 15,000 | Barasat | West Bengal | | Football |
| Maharaja's College Stadium | 15,000 | Kochi | Kerala | | Athletics, Football |
| Kalinga Stadium | 15,000 | Bhubaneswar | Odisha | Odisha FC | Sports complex |
| Ravi Shankar Shukla Stadium | 15,000 | Jabalpur | Madhya Pradesh | local football teams | Football |
| Thrissur Municipal Corporation Stadium | 15,000 | Thrissur | Kerala | local football team | Football |
| Mohammedan Sporting Ground | 15,000 | Kolkata | West Bengal | Mohammedan SC | Football |
| Rajendra Stadium | 15,000 | Siwan | Bihar | | Football |
| Jadavpur Stadium | 12,000 | Kolkata | West Bengal | local football teams | Football |
| Calicut Medical College Stadium | 12,000 | Kozhikode | Kerala | local football team | Football |
| Kishore Bharati Krirangan | 12,000 | Kolkata | West Bengal | | Football |
| Tilak Maidan Stadium | 12,000 | Vasco da Gama | Goa | local football team | Football |
| Shree Shiv Chhatrapati Sports Complex | 10,800 | Pune | Maharashtra | | Sports complex |
| Birsa Munda Football Stadium | 10,000 | Ranchi | Jharkhand | Jamshedpur FC, JSA League | Athletics, Football |
| Dr. Rajendra Prasad Football Stadium | 10,000 | Neemuch | Madhya Pradesh | | Football |
| Dr Sampurnanda Stadium | 10,000 | Varanasi | Uttar Pradesh | Uttar Pradesh cricket team | Cricket, Hockey, Football |
| Fort Maidan | 10,000 | Palakkad | Kerala | | Football |
| Jorethang Ground | 10,000 | Jorethang | Sikkim | | Football |
| Mela Ground | 10,000 | Kalimpong | West Bengal | local football teams | Football |
| Duler Stadium | 10,000 | Mapusa | Goa | local football teams | Football |

== Indonesia ==
| Stadium | Capacity | Location | Tenants |
|---|---|---|---|
| Jakarta International Stadium | 82,000 | Jakarta | Persija |
| Stadion Gelora Bung Karno | 77,193 | Jakarta | Persija |
| Stadion Gelora Bung Tomo | 46,806 | Surabaya | Persebaya Surabaya |
| Stadion Harapan Bangsa | 45,000 | Banda Aceh | Persiraja Banda Aceh |
| Stadion Utama Riau | 43,923 | Pekanbaru | PSPS Riau |
| Stadion Lukas Enembe | 40,263 | Jayapura | Persipura Jayapura |
| Stadion Barombong | 40,000 | Makassar | PSM Makassar |
| Stadion Batakan | 40,000 | Balikpapan | Persiba Balikpapan |
| Stadion Gelora Joko Samudro | 40,000 | Gresik | Gresik United |
| Stadion Petrokimia | 40,000 | Gresik | Gresik United |
| Stadion Kanjuruhan | 38,000 | Malang | Arema |
| Stadion Gelora Bandung Lautan Api | 38,000 | Bandung | Persib Bandung |
| Stadion Aji Imbut | 35,000 | Kutai Kartanegara | Mitra Kukar |
| Stadion Gelora Delta | 35,000 | Sidoarjo | Deltras |
| Stadion Mandala Krida | 35,000 | Yogyakarta | PSIM Yogyakarta |
| Stadion Palaran | 35,000 | Samarinda | |
| Stadion Sultan Agung | 35,000 | Bantul | Persiba Bantul |
| Stadion Maguwoharjo | 31,700 | Sleman | PSS Sleman |
| Stadion Si Jalak Harupat | 30,100 | Bandung | PSKC Cimahi |
| Banten International Stadium | 30,000 | Serang | |
| Indomilk Arena | 30,000 | Tangerang | Persita Tangerang |
| Stadion Kaharudin Nasution Rumbai | 30,000 | Pekanbaru | PSPS Riau |
| Stadion Mandala | 30,000 | Jayapura | Persipura Jayapura |
| Stadion Moch. Soebroto | 30,000 | Magelang | |
| Stadion Pakansari | 30,000 | Bogor | Persikabo 1973 |
| Stadion Patriot Candrabhaga | 30,000 | Bekasi | Bhayangkara |
| Stadion Wibawa Mukti | 30,000 | Bekasi | |
| Stadion Gajayana | 25,000 | Malang | |
| Stadion Jatidiri | 25,000 | Semarang | PSIS |
| Stadion Kuantan Singingi | 25,000 | Kuantan Singingi | |
| Stadion Maesa | 25,000 | Tondano | |
| Stadion Pattimura | 25,000 | Ambon | |
| Stadion Siliwangi | 25,000 | Bandung | |
| Stadion Singaperbangsa | 25,000 | Karawang | |
| Stadion Sumpah Pemuda | 25,000 | Bandar Lampung | |
| Stadion Wilis | 25,000 | Madiun | |
| Stadion Gelora Sriwijaya | 23,000 | Palembang | |
| Stadion Brawijaya | 20,000 | Kediri | Persik |
| Stadion Galuh | 20,000 | Ciamis | |
| Stadion Gawalise | 20,000 | Palu | Persipal |
| Stadion Gelora 10 November | 20,000 | Surabaya | |
| Stadion Gelora Bumi Kartini | 20,000 | Jepara | |
| Stadion Gelora Haji Agus Salim | 20,000 | Padang | Semen Padang F.C. |
| Stadion H. Dimurthala | 20,000 | Banda Aceh | |
| Stadion Hoegeng | 20,000 | Pekalongan | |
| Stadion Jember Sport Garden | 20,000 | Jember | |
| Stadion Manahan | 20,000 | Surakarta | PERSIS |
| Stadion Teladan | 20,000 | Medan | PSMS |
| Stadion Tunas Bangsa | 20,000 | Lhokseumawe | |
| Stadion Kapten I Wayan Dipta | 18,000 | Gianyar | Arema, Bali United F.C. |
| Stadion Segiri | 16,000 | Samarinda | Borneo F.C. Samarinda |
| Stadion Surajaya | 16,000 | Lamongan | Persela |
| Stadion Watubelah | 16,000 | Cirebon | |
| Stadion 17 Mei | 15,000 | Banjarmasin | |
| Stadion Andi Mattalatta | 15,000 | Makassar | PSM |
| Stadion Baharuddin Siregar | 15,000 | Lubuk Pakam | PSDS |
| Stadion Barnabas Youwe | 15,000 | Sentani | |
| Stadion Bima | 15,000 | Cirebon | |
| Stadion Cendrawasih | 15,000 | Biak | PSBS |
| Stadion Diponegoro | 15,000 | Banyuwangi | |
| Stadion Gelora Bangkalan | 15,000 | Bangkalan | |
| Stadion Gelora Kieraha | 15,000 | Ternate | |
| Stadion Gelora Supriyadi | 15,000 | Blitar | |
| Stadion Goentoer Darjono | 15,000 | Purbalingga | |
| Stadion Kamal Djunaedi | 15,000 | Jepara | |
| Stadion Letjen Haji Sudirman | 15,000 | Bojonegoro | |
| Stadion Maulana Yusuf | 15,000 | Serang | Perserang |
| Stadion Mochtar | 15,000 | Pemalang | |
| Stadion Moh Sarengat | 15,000 | Batang | |
| Stadion Notohadinegoro | 15,000 | Jember | |
| Stadion Pahoman | 15,000 | Bandar Lampung | |
| Stadion Pandan Arang | 15,000 | Boyolali | |
| Stadion Persikabo | 15,000 | Cibinong | |
| Stadion Semarak | 15,000 | Bengkulu | |
| Stadion Semeru | 15,000 | Lumajang | |
| Stadion Sempaja | 15,000 | Samarinda | |
| Stadion Wergu Wetan | 15,000 | Kudus | |
| Stadion Wijayakusuma | 15,000 | Cilacap | PSCS |
| Stadion Gelora Ratu Pamelingan | 13,500 | Pamekasan | Madura United F.C. |
| Stadion Kebo Giro | 12,000 | Boyolali | Nusantara United F.C. |
| Stadion Krita Bakti | 12,000 | Purwodadi | |
| Stadion Mulawarman | 12,000 | Bontang | |
| Stadion Ngurah Rai | 12,000 | Denpasar | |
| Stadion Persiba | 12,000 | Balikpapan | |
| Stadion Tridadi | 12,000 | Sleman | |
| Stadion Abu Bakrin | 10,000 | Magelang | |
| Stadion Ambang | 10,000 | Kotamobagu | |
| Stadion Anjukladang | 10,000 | Nganjuk | |
| Stadion Beringin | 10,000 | Tembilahan | |
| Stadion Chandradimuka | 10,000 | Kebumen | |
| Stadion Gajahmada Mojosari | 10,000 | Mojokerto | |
| Stadion Gelora Handayani | 10,000 | Wonosari | |
| Stadion Kamal Muara | 10,000 | Jakarta | |
| Stadion Ketonggo | 10,000 | Ngawi | |
| Stadion Klabat | 10,000 | Manado | Sulut United F.C. |
| Stadion Krida | 10,000 | Rembang | |
| Stadion Lagaligo | 10,000 | Palopo | |
| Stadion Mashud Wisnusaputra | 10,000 | Kuningan | |
| Stadion Merdeka | 10,000 | Gorontalo | |
| Stadion Pogar Bangil | 10,000 | Bangil | |
| Stadion Purnawarman | 10,000 | Purwakarta | |
| Stadion Sanggeng | 10,000 | Manokwari | |
| Stadion Tuah Pahoe | 10,000 | Palangka Raya | Kalteng Putra F.C. |
| Stadion Tuanku Tambusai | 10,000 | Bangkinang | |

== Iran ==
| Stadium | Capacity | Tenants |
|---|---|---|
| Azadi Stadium | 78,000 | Iran, Esteghlal and Persepolis |
| Naghsh-e Jahan Stadium | 75,000 | Sepahan |
| Sahand Stadium | 66,833 | Tractor Sazi |
| Pars Shiraz Stadium | 50,000 | Fajr Sepasi F.C. |
| Ghadir Stadium | 38,900 | Esteghlal Khuzestan |
| Foolad Arena Stadium | 30,655 | Foolad |
| Takhti Stadium | 30,000 | — |
| Samen Stadium | 27,000 | Abomoslem and Padideh |
| Shahid Shiroudi Stadium | 20,000 | — |
| Takhti Stadium | 15,000 | Esteghlal Ahvaz |
| Dr. Azodi Stadium | 15,000 | Damash |
| Hafezieh Stadium | 15,000 | Fajr Sepasi |
| Sirous Ghayeghran Stadium | 15,000 | Malavan |
| Takhti Stadium | 15,000 | Shahrdari Tabriz and Machine Sazi |
| Enghelab Stadium | 15,000 | Saipa |
| Sardar Jangal Stadium | 15,000 | Damash Gilan |
| Yadegar-e Emam Stadium | 12,000 | Saba Qom F.C. |
| Fooladshahr Stadium | 12,000 | Zob Ahan and Sepahan |
| Rah Ahan Stadium | 12,000 | Rah Ahan |
| Takhti Stadium | 10,000 | Sanat Naft |

== Iraq ==
| Stadium | Capacity | City | Region | Tenants | Opened |
|---|---|---|---|---|---|
| Basra International Stadium | 65,000 | Basra | Basra Governorate | Al-Mina'a, Naft Al-Basra and Iraq | 2013 |
| Al-Shaab Stadium | 35,700 | Baghdad | Baghdad Governorate | Baghdad derbies | 1966 |
| Al-Madina Stadium | 32,000 | Al Habibya, Sadr City | Baghdad Governorate | Iraq | 2021 |
| Karbala International Stadium | 30,000 | Karbala | Karbala Governorate | Karbalaa and Iraq | 2016 |
| Al-Najaf International Stadium | 30,000 | Najaf | Najaf Governorate | Al-Najaf and Naft Al-Wasat | 2018 |
| Franso Hariri Stadium | 25,000 | Erbil | Kurdistan Region | Erbil | 1956 |
| Kirkuk Olympic Stadium | 25,000 | Kirkuk | Kirkuk Governorate | Kirkuk | 1982 |
| Maysan Stadium | 25,000 | Amarah | Maysan Governorate | Naft Maysan and Maysan FC | 1987 |
| Duhok Stadium | 20,000 | Duhok | Kurdistan Region | Duhok | 1986 |
| Zakho International Stadium | 20,000 | Zakho | Kurdistan Region | Zakho | 2015 |
| Al-Kut Olympic Stadium | 20,000 | Al-Kut | Wasit Governorate | Al-Kut | 2018 |
| Al-Nasiriya International Stadium | 20,000 | Nasiriyah | Dhi Qar Governorate | Al-Nasiriya | 2024 |
| Sulaymaniyah Stadium | 18,000 | Sulaymaniyah | Kurdistan Region | Sulaymaniyah | |
| Al-Samawah Stadium | 15,000 | Al-Samawah | Muthanna Governorate | Al-Samawa | |
| Al-Zawraa Stadium | 14,500 | Baghdad | Baghdad Governorate | Al-Zawraa | 2022 |
| Al-Kashafa Stadium | 14,000 | Al Kasrah | Baghdad Governorate | | 1931 |
| Al-Shorta Stadium | 10,089 | Baghdad | Baghdad Governorate | Al-Shorta | 2025 |
| Al Kifl Stadium | 10,000 | Al Kifl | Babil Governorate | Al-Qasim | 2018 |
| Al Fayhaa Stadium | 10,000 | Basra | Basra Governorate | Al-Mina'a and Naft Al-Basra | 2013 |
| Al-Najaf Stadium | 10,000 | Najaf | Najaf Governorate | Al-Najaf | |
| Karbala'a Stadium | 10,000 | Karbala | Karbala Governorate | Karbalaa | |
| Samarra Stadium | 10,000 | Samarra | Salah ad Din Governorate | Samarra | |
| Suq Al-Shuyukh Stadium | 10,000 | Suq al-Shuyukh District | Dhi Qar Governorate | Suq Al-Shuyukh | 2015 |
| Delal Stadium | 10,000 | Zakho | Kurdistan Region | Zakho | |
| Al Aziziyah Stadium | 10,000 | Al-Aziziyah | Wasit Governorate | Al-Aziziyah | 2019 |
| Al Hilla Stadium | 10,000 | Hillah | Babil Governorate | Al-Hilla and Babylon | |
| Al Nasiriyah Stadium | 10,000 | Nasiriyah | Dhi Qar Governorate | Al-Nasiriya | |
| Ba'quba Stadium | 10,000 | Baqubah | Diyala Governorate | Diyala | |
| Tikrit Stadium | 10,000 | Tikrit | Salah ad Din Governorate | Salahaddin and Tikrit | |

== Ireland ==
| Stadium | Capacity | Tenants |
|---|---|---|
| Aviva Stadium | 51,700 | FAI, IRFU |
| Tallaght Stadium | 10,500 | Shamrock Rovers F.C. |

== Israel ==
| Stadium | Capacity | Tenants |
|---|---|---|
| Teddy Stadium | 31,733 | Beitar Jerusalem, Hapoel Jerusalem |
| Sammy Ofer Stadium | 30,950 | Maccabi Haifa, Hapoel Haifa |
| Bloomfield Stadium | 29,400 | Maccabi Tel Aviv, Hapoel Tel Aviv |
| Turner Stadium | 16,126 | Hapoel Be'er Sheva |
| Netanya Stadium | 13,610 | Maccabi Netanya |
| Ramat Gan Stadium | 13,370 | Hapoel Ramat Gan |
| HaMoshava Stadium | 11,500 | Hapoel Petah Tikva, Maccabi Petah Tikva |

== Italy ==
| Stadium | Capacity | City | Tenants | Opened |
|---|---|---|---|---|
| San Siro | 80,074 | Milan | AC Milan, Inter Milan and Italy | 1927 |
| Stadio Olimpico | 72,700 | Rome | AS Roma, Lazio and Italy | 1952 |
| Stadio San Nicola | 58,248 | Bari | SSC Bari | 1990 |
| Stadio Diego Armando Maradona | 54,726 | Naples | SSC Napoli | 1959 |
| Stadio Artemio Franchi | 47,282 | Florence | Fiorentina | 1931 |
| Juventus Stadium | 41,507 | Turin | Juventus | 2011 |
| Stadio San Filippo | 40,200 | Messina | ACR Messina | 2004 |
| Stadio Renato Dall'Ara | 39,444 | Bologna | Bologna FC | 1927 |
| Stadio Marc'Antonio Bentegodi | 39,211 | Verona | Hellas Verona | 1963 |
| Stadio Renzo Barbera | 37,619 | Palermo | US Città di Palermo | 1932 |
| Stadio Arechi | 37,245 | Salerno | Salernitana | 1990 |
| Stadio Luigi Ferraris | 36,536 | Genoa | Genoa and Sampdoria | 1911 |
| Stadio Via del Mare | 36,285 | Lecce | US Lecce | 1966 |
| Stadio Nereo Rocco | 32,454 | Trieste | Triestina | 1992 |
| Stadio Euganeo | 32,336 | Padua | Calcio Padova | 1994 |
| Stadio Renato Curi | 28,000 | Perugia | Perugia Calcio | 1975 |
| Stadio Olimpico di Torino | 27,994 | Turin | Torino FC | 1933 |
| Stadio Ennio Tardini | 27,906 | Parma | Parma Calcio 1913 | 1923 |
| Stadio Oreste Granillo | 27,763 | Reggio Calabria | Reggina | 1932 |
| Stadio Erasmo Iacovone | 27,584 | Taranto | Taranto FC 1927 | 1965 |
| Stadio Mario Rigamonti | 27,547 | Brescia | Brescia Calcio | 1928 |
| Stadio Partenio | 26,308 | Avellino | US Avellino | 1973 |
| Stadio del Conero | 26,000 | Ancona | AC Ancona | 1992 |
| Bluenergy Stadium | 25,144 | Udine | Udinese | 1976 |
| Stadio Pino Zaccheria | 25,000 | Foggia | US Foggia | 1925 |
| Stadio Ciro Vigorito | 25,000 | Benevento | Benevento Calcio | 1979 |
| Stadio Nuovo Romagnoli | 25,000 | Campobasso | SSD Città di Campobasso | 1985 |
| Stadio Atleti Azzurri d'Italia | 24,642 | Bergamo | Atalanta | 1928 |
| Stadio San Vito-Gigi Marulla | 24,209 | Cosenza | Cosenza Calcio | 1914 |
| Stadio Dino Manuzzi | 23,860 | Cesena | AC Cesena | 1957 |
| Stadio Adriatico | 23,800 | Pescara | Delfino Pescara 1936 | 1955 |
| Stadio Sant'Elia | 23,486 | Cagliari | Cagliari Calcio | 1970 |
| Stadio Angelo Massimino | 23,420 | Catania | Calcio Catania | 1937 |
| Stadio Riviera delle Palme | 22,000 | San Benedetto del Tronto | Sambenedettese | 1985 |
| Stadio Leonardo Garilli | 21,608 | Piacenza | Piacenza Calcio | 1969 |
| Stadio Libero Liberati | 21,000 | Terni | Ternana Calcio | 1969 |
| Stadio Giovanni Zini | 20,641 | Cremona | Cremonese | 1919 |
| Stadio Alberto Braglia | 20,507 | Modena | Modena FC | 1936 |
| Stadio Cino e Lillo Del Duca | 20,000 | Ascoli Piceno | Ascoli Calcio 1898 | 1962 |
| Stadio Carlo Castellani | 19,847 | Empoli | Empoli FC | 1923 |
| Stadio Armando Picchi | 19,238 | Livorno | AS Livorno | 1933 |
| Stadio Brianteo | 18,568 | Monza | AC Monza | 1988 |
| Stadio Paolo Mazza | 17,955 | Ferrara | SPAL | 1928 |
| Stadio Silvio Piola | 17,875 | Novara | Novara Calcio | 1976 |
| Arena Garibaldi | 17,000 | Pisa | AC Pisa | 1919 |
| Stadio Benito Stirpe | 16,227 | Frosinone | Frosinone Calcio | 2017 |
| Stadio Artemio Franchi | 15,725 | Siena | AC Siena | 1923 |
| Stadio San Francesco d'Assisi | 15,000 | Nocera Inferiore | Nocerina | 1970 |
| Stadio Danilo Martelli | 14,844 | Mantua | AC Mantova | 1961 |
| Stadio Giglio | 14,138 | Reggio Emilia | Reggiana | 1995 |
| Stadio Alberto Pinto | 14,000 | Caserta | Casertana FC | 1936 |
| Stadio Nicola Ceravolo | 13,619 | Catanzaro | FC Catanzaro | 1919 |
| Stadio Giuseppe Sinigaglia | 13,602 | Como | Calcio Como | 1927 |
| Stadio Marcello Melani | 13,195 | Pistoia | AC Pistoiese | 1966 |
| Stadio Città di Arezzo | 13,128 | Arezzo | AC Arezzo | 1961 |
| Stadio Romeo Menti | 12,500 | Vicenza | Vicenza Calcio | 1934 |
| Stadio Simonetta Lamberti | 12,000 | Cava de' Tirreni | SS Cavese 1919 | 1960 |
| Stadio Domenico Francioni | 11,200 | Latina | Latina Calcio | 1935 |
| Stadio Pier Luigi Penzo | 11,150 | Venice | Venezia FC | 1913 |
| Stadio Romeo Menti | 10,400 | Castellammare di Stabia | Juve Stabia | 1984 |
| Stadio Alberto Picco | 10,336 | La Spezia | Spezia Calcio | 1919 |

== Ivory Coast ==
| Stadium | Location | Capacity | Tenants |
|---|---|---|---|
| Alassane Ouattara Stadium | Abidjan | 60,000 | National team |
| Stade de la Paix | Bouaké | 40,000 | Bouaké FC |
| Felix Houphouet Boigny Stadium | Abidjan | 33,000 | ASEC Mimosas |
| Charles Konan Banny Stadium | Yamoussoukro | 20,000 | SO de l'Armée |
| Laurent Pokou Stadium | San-Pédro | 20,000 | FC San Pédro |
| Amadou Gon Coulibaly Stadium | Korhogo | 20,000 | National team |
| Stade Municipal d'Abidjan | Abidjan | 10,000 | Stade d'Abidjan |
| Stade Municipal Bouna | Bouna | 10,000 | Sabé Sports de Bouna |

== Jamaica ==
| Stadium | Location | Capacity | Tenants |
|---|---|---|---|
| Independence Park | Kingston | 35,000 | Jamaica national football team |
| Trelawny Stadium | Trelawny | 25,000 | |
| Sabina Park | Kingston | 15,600 | |

== Japan ==
| Stadium | Capacity | Tenants |
|---|---|---|
| International Stadium Yokohama | 72,327 | Yokohama F. Marinos |
| National Stadium | 67,750 | Japan |
| Saitama Stadium 2002 | 63,700 | Urawa Red Diamonds |
| Shizuoka Stadium | 50,889 | Jubilo Iwata, Shimizu S-Pulse |
| Hiroshima Big Arch | 50,000 | Sanfrecce Hiroshima |
| Ajinomoto Stadium | 49,970 | F.C. Tokyo, Tokyo Verdy |
| Miyagi Stadium | 49,133 | Vegalta Sendai |
| Nagai Stadium | 47,853 | Cerezo Osaka |
| Toyota Stadium | 45,000 | Nagoya Grampus |
| Kobe Universiade Memorial Stadium | 45,000 | Vissel Kobe |
| Denka Big Swan Stadium | 42,300 | Albirex Niigata |
| Sapporo Dome | 41,484 | Consadole Sapporo |
| Kashima Soccer Stadium | 40,728 | Kashima Antlers |
| Crasus Dome Oita | 40,000 | Ōita Trinita |
| Suita City Football Stadium | 39,694 | Gamba Osaka |
| Egao Kenko Stadium | 32,000 | Roasso Kumamoto |
| Noevir Stadium Kobe | 30,132 | Vissel Kobe |
| Mizuho Athletic Stadium | 27,000 | Nagoya Grampus Eight |
| Todoroki Athletics Stadium | 25,000 | Kawasaki Frontale |
| Tosu Stadium | 25,000 | Sagan Tosu |
| Hakata no Mori Stadium | 22,563 | Avispa Fukuoka |
| Urawa Komaba Stadium | 21,500 | Urawa Red Diamonds |
| Osaka Expo '70 Stadium | 21,000 | Gamba Osaka |
| Matsumotodaira Football Stadium | 20,396 | Matsumoto Yamaga F.C. |
| Nishikyogoku Athletic Stadium | 20,389 | Kyoto Purple Sanga |
| Nihondaira Stadium | 20,339 | Shimizu S-Pulse |
| Yamagata Park Stadium | 20,315 | Montedio Yamagata |
| Sapporo Atsubetsu Park Stadium | 20,005 | Consadole Sapporo |
| PEACE STADIUM | 20,000 | V-Varen Nagasaki |
| Kashiwa no Ha Park Stadium | 20,000 | Kashiwa Reysol |
| Naruto Athletic Stadium | 20,000 | Tokushima VORTIS |
| Fukuda Denshi Arena | 19,781 | JEF United Ichihara Chiba |
| Yurtec Stadium Sendai | 19,694 | Vegalta Sendai |
| Hiratsuka Athletics Stadium | 18,500 | Shonan Bellmare |
| Yamaha Stadium | 17,343 | Jubilo Iwata |
| Kose Sports Stadium | 17,000 | Ventforet Kofu |
| Hitachi Kashiwa Soccer Stadium | 15,900 | Kashiwa Reysol |
| Tochigi Green Stadium | 15,589 | Tochigi S.C. |
| Omiya Park Soccer Stadium | 15,500 | Omiya Ardija |
| Shoda Shoyu Stadium Gunma | 15,253 | Thespakusatsu Gunma |
| Mitsuzawa Stadium | 15,046 | Yokohama FC |
| K's denki Stadium Mito | 12,000 | Mito HollyHock |
| Honjō Athletic Stadium | 10,202 | Giravanz Kitakyushu |

== Jordan ==
| Stadium | Capacity | City | Tenants | Year built | Ref. |
|---|---|---|---|---|---|
| Amman International Stadium | 17,619 | Amman | Jordan national football team, Al-Faisaly SC | 1968 | |
| King Abdullah II Stadium | 13,265 | Amman | Jordan national football team, Al-Wehdat SC, Shabab Al-Hussein SC, Shabab Al-Ordon Club, Al-Yarmouk FC | 1999 | |
| Al-Hassan Stadium | 12,301 | Irbid | Jordan women's national football team, Al-Hussein SC | 1990 | |
| Prince Mohammed Stadium | 11,402 | Zarqa | Jordan national football team, Jordan women's national football team, Ittihad Al-Zarqa | 1999 | |

== Kazakhstan ==
| Stadium | Capacity | City | Tenants | Year of establishment |
|---|---|---|---|---|
| Astana Arena | 30,244 | Astana | FC Astana | 2009 |
| Almaty Central Stadium | 23,804 | Almaty | Kairat | 1958 |
| Kazhymukan Munaitpasov Stadium | 20,000 | Shymkent | Ordabasy | 1969 |
| Shakhtyor Stadium | 19,500 | Karagandy | Shakhter | 1958 |
| Aktobe Central Stadium | 13,500 | Aktobe | Aktobe | 1975 |
| Taraz Central Stadium | 12,525 | Taraz | Taraz | 1936 |
| K.Munaitpasov, Astana | 12,350 | Astana | Astana | 1936 |
| Metallurg Stadium | 12,000 | Temirtau | Bolat | 1949 |
| Pavlodar Central Stadium | 12,000 | Pavlodar | Irtysh | 1947 |
| Avangard Stadium | 11,000 | Petropavl | Kyzylzhar | 1964 |

== Kenya ==
| Stadium | City | Capacity | Tenants |
|---|---|---|---|
| Moi International Sports Centre Stadium | Nairobi | 60,000 | Kenya national football team, Gor Mahia F.C. |
| William Ole Ntimama Stadium | Narok | 20,000 | |
| Nyayo National Stadium | Nairobi | 18,000 | |
| Jomo Kenyatta International Stadium | Kisumu | 15,000 | |
| Kinoru Stadium | Meru | 15,000 | |
| Ithookwe Stadium | Kitui | 10,000 | |

== Kosovo ==
| Stadium | Capacity | City | Tenants | Inaugurated |
|---|---|---|---|---|
| Adem Jashari Olympic Stadium | 18,500 | Mitrovica | KF Trepça; KFF Mitrovica; Kosovo national teams | 1938 |
| Fadil Vokrri Stadium | 15,500 | Pristina | FC Prishtina; Kosovo national teams | 1953 |
| Gjilan City Stadium | 15,000 | Gjilan | Gjilani, Drita | 1967 |
| Rexhep Rexhepi Stadium | 10,000 | Drenas | Feronikeli | 2012 |

== Kuwait ==
| Stadium | Capacity | Tenants |
|---|---|---|
| Jaber Al-Ahmad International Stadium | 60,000 | Kuwait national football team |
| Sabah Al Salem Stadium | 22,000 | Al Arabi |
| Al-Sadaqua Walsalam Stadium | 21,500 | Kazma |
| Mohammed Al-Hamad Stadium | 20,000 | Qadsia |
| Al Kuwait Sports Club Stadium | 18,500 | Kuwait SC |
| Al-Ahmadi Stadium | 18,000 | Al Shabab |
| Kuwait National Stadium | 16,000 | |
| Thamir Stadium | 14,000 | Al Salmiyah |
| Farwaniya Stadium | 14,000 | Tadamon |

== Kyrgyzstan ==
| Stadium | Location | Capacity | Tenants |
|---|---|---|---|
| Bishkek Arena | Bishkek | 51,000 | Kyrgyzstan national football team |
| Dolen Omurzakov Stadium | Bishkek | 23,000 | |

== Laos ==
| Stadium | Capacity | Tenants |
|---|---|---|
| New Laos National Stadium | 25,000 | Laos national football team |
| Chao Anouvong National Stadium | 20,000 | Lao League |
| Savannakhét Provincial stadium | 15,000 | multi-use |
| Champasak Stadium | 11,000 | multi-use |
| Luang Prabang stadium | 10,000 | multi-use |

== Latvia ==
| Stadium | Capacity | Tenants |
|---|---|---|
| Daugava National Stadium | 10,461 | multi–use |

== Lebanon ==
| Stadium | Capacity | City | Tenants |
|---|---|---|---|
| Camille Chamoun Sports City Stadium | 49,500 | Beirut | Lebanon national football team |
| Saida Municipal Stadium | 22,600 | Sidon | Al Ahli SC Saida |
| Tripoli International Olympic Stadium | 22,400 | Tripoli | |
| Beirut Municipal Stadium | 18,000 | Beirut | |
| Tripoli Municipal Stadium | 10,000 | Tripoli | AC Tripoli |

== Lesotho ==
| Stadium | Capacity | City | Tenants |
|---|---|---|---|
| Setsoto Stadium | 13,900 | Maseru | Lesotho national football team |

== Liberia ==
| Stadium | Capacity | City | Tenants |
|---|---|---|---|
| Samuel Kanyon Doe Sports Complex | 22,000 | Paynesville | Liberia national football team |

== Libya ==
| Stadium | Capacity | City | Tenants |
|---|---|---|---|
| Tripoli Stadium | 45,000 | Tripoli | Libya national football team |
| Martyrs of February Stadium | 10,550 | Benghazi | Al-Ahly SCSC; Al-Hilal SCSC; Al-Nasr SCSC |

== Lithuania ==
| Stadium | Capacity | Tenants |
|---|---|---|
| S.Dariaus ir S.Girėno Stadium | 15,026 | FBK Kaunas, Lithuania |

== Macau ==
| Stadium | Capacity | Tenants |
|---|---|---|
| Estádio Campo Desportivo | 16,272 | Macau national football team |

== Madagascar ==
| Stadium | Capacity | City | Tenants |
|---|---|---|---|
| Mahamasina Municipal Stadium | 40,880 | Antananarivo | Madagascar national football team |
| Kianja Barikadimy | 25,000 | Toamasina | |
| Stade CNaPS Sport | 15,000 | Toamasina | |

== Malawi ==
| Stadium | Capacity | City | Tenants |
|---|---|---|---|
| Kamuzu Stadium | 65,000 | Blantyre | Mighty Wanderers, Nyasa Big Bullets |
| Bingu National Stadium | 41,100 | Lilongwe | Malawi national football team, Silver Strikers |
| Civo Stadium | 25,000 | Lilongwe | Civil Service United, Kamuzu Barracks, Mchinji Extreme FC |
| Karonga Stadium | 20,000 | Karonga | Chitipa United, Karonga United |
| Mzuzu Stadium | 15,000 | Mzuzu | Ekwendeni Hammers, Moyale Barracks |

== Malaysia ==
| Stadium | Capacity | City | Tenants |
|---|---|---|---|
| Bukit Jalil National Stadium | 87,411 | Kuala Lumpur | Malaysia national football team, 100,200 capacity only if they make it all seater. |
| Shah Alam Stadium | 69,372 | Shah Alam | Selangor FA |
| Sultan Mizan Zainal Abidin Stadium | 50,000 | Kuala Terengganu | Terengganu FA |
| Hang Jebat Stadium | 40,000 | Melaka | Malacca FA |
| Negeri Pulau Pinang Stadium | 40,000 | Batu Kawan | Penang FA |
| Sarawak Stadium | 40,000 | Kuching | Sarawak FA |
| Darulmakmur Stadium | 40,000 | Kuantan | Pahang FA, Shahzan Muda FC |
| Likas Stadium | 35,000 | Kota Kinabalu | Sabah FA |
| Perak Stadium | 35,000 | Ipoh | Perak FA |
| Darul Aman Stadium | 32,387 | Alor Star | Kedah FA, Kuala Muda Naza FC |
| Sultan Mohammad IV Stadium | 30,000 | Kota Bharu | Kelantan FA |
| Langkawi Stadium | 30,000 | Kedah | recreational facilities in the area of Langkawi |
| Tuanku Abdul Rahman Stadium | 30,000 | Negeri Sembilan | Negeri Sembilan FA |
| Tan Sri Dato Hj Hassan Yunos Stadium | 30,000 | Johor Bahru | Johor FA, Johor Pasir Gudang |
| Sarawak State Stadium | 26,000 | Kuching | PB Sarawak |
| Sultan Ismail Nasiruddin Shah Stadium | 25,000 | Terengganu | Some Terengganu FA and Kelantan FA Matches. |
| MBPJ Stadium | 25,000 | Petaling Jaya | UPB-MyTeam FC, MPPJ Selangor FC |
| Utama Negeri Stadium | 20,000 | Kangar | Perlis FA |
| Selayang Stadium | 20,000 | Selayang | PB Selangor |
| City Stadium | 20,000 | Pinang | Pinang state Football team. |
| Stadium Merdeka | 20,000 | Kuala Lumpur | PB Kuala Lumpur |
| KLFA Stadium | 18,000 | Kuala Lumpur | Kuala Lumpur FA |
| Pasir Gudang Corporation Stadium | 15,000 | Pasir Gudang | Pasir Gudang United FC |
| Hang Tuah Stadium | 15,000 | Melaka | Malacca FA |
| Naval Base Stadium | 12,000 | Lumut | ATM FA |
| UiTM Stadium | 10,000 | Selangor | UiTM FC |

== Maldives ==
| Stadium | Capacity | City | Tenants |
|---|---|---|---|
| National Football Stadium | 11,000 | Malé | Maldives national football team |

== Mali ==
| Stadium | Capacity | City | Tenants |
|---|---|---|---|
| Stade 26 mars | 50,000 | Bamako | CO Bamako, Djoliba AC, Stade Malien |
| Stade Modibo Kéïta | 35,000 | Bamako | AS Real Bamako |
| Stade Babemba Traoré | 30,000 | Sikasso | |
| Stade Abdoulaye Nakoro Cissoko | 30,000 | | |
| Stade Amari Daou | 30,000 | | |
| Stade Baréma Bocoum | 30,000 | | |

== Malta ==
| Stadium | Capacity | City | Tenants |
|---|---|---|---|
| Grawnd Nazzjonali | 16,997 | Ta' Qali | Malta national football team |

== Martinique ==
| Stadium | Capacity | City | Tenants |
|---|---|---|---|
| Stade Pierre-Aliker | 16,300 | Fort-de-France | Martinique national football team, Club Colonial |

== Mauritania ==
| Stadium | Capacity | City | Tenants |
|---|---|---|---|
| Stade olympique | 20,000 | Nouakchott | Mauritania national football team |
| Stade municipal de Nouadhibou | 10,000 | Nouadhibou | FC Nouadhibou |

== Mauritius ==
| Stadium | Capacity | City | Tenants |
|---|---|---|---|
| Stade Anjalay | 16,000 | Belle Vue Maurel | Mauritius national football team, Pamplemousses SC, AS Rivière du Rempart, Arsenal Wanderers |

== Mexico ==
| Stadium | Capacity | City | State | Tenants |
|---|---|---|---|---|
| Azteca | 87,523 | Tlalpan | Mexico City | América, Mexico |
| Jalisco | 55,110 | Guadalajara | Jalisco | Atlas, UdeG |
| BBVA Bancomer | 51,348 | Guadalupe | Nuevo León | Monterrey |
| Olímpico Universitario | 48,297 | Coyoacán | Mexico City | UNAM |
| Cuauhtémoc | 46,928 | Puebla City | Puebla | Puebla |
| Chivas | 45,364 | Zapopan | Jalisco | Guadalajara |
| Universitario | 41,886 | San Nicolás de los Garza | Nuevo León | UANL |
| Morelos | 34,795 | Morelia | Michoacán | Monarcas Morelia |
| Corregidora | 33,162 | Querétaro City | Querétaro | Querétaro |
| Azul | 33,000 | Benito Juárez | Mexico City | Cruz Azul |
| Universitario Alberto "Chivo" Córdoba | 32,603 | Toluca | Mexico | UAEM |
| León | 31,297 | León | Guanajuato | León |
| Nemesio Díez | 30,000 | Toluca | Mexico | Toluca |
| Corona | 29,237 | Torreón | Coahuila | Santos Laguna |
| Víctor Manuel Reyna | 29,001 | Tuxtla Gutiérrez | Chiapas | Tuxtla |
| Luis "Pirata" Fuente | 28,703 | Veracruz | Veracruz | Veracruz |
| Hidalgo | 27,512 | Pachuca | Hidalgo | Pachuca |
| Caliente | 27,333 | Tijuana | Baja California | Tijuana |
| Alfonso Lastras | 25,111 | San Luis Potosí City | San Luis Potosí | Atlético San Luis |
| Sergio León Chávez | 25,000 | Irapuato | Guanajuato | Irapuato |
| Agustín "Coruco" Díaz | 24,313 | Zacatepec | Morelos | Zacatepec |
| Victoria | 23,851 | Aguascalientes City | Aguascalientes | Necaxa |
| Miguel Alemán Valdés | 23,182 | Celaya | Guanajuato | Celaya |
| Venustiano Carranza | 22,340 | Morelia | Michoacán | Atlético Valladolid |
| Olímpico Universitario José Reyes Baeza | 22,000 | Chihuahua City | Chihuahua | UACH |
| El Hogar | 22,000 | Matamoros | Tamaulipas | Matamoros |
| Ignacio Zaragoza | 22,000 | Puebla City | Puebla | — |
| Olímpico de Tapachula | 21,018 | Tapachula | Chiapas | Tapachula |
| Banorte | 20,108 | Culiacán | Sinaloa | Sinaloa |
| Unidad Deportiva Solidaridad | 20,000 | Reynosa | Tamaulipas | Atlético Reynosa |
| Neza 86 | 20,000 | Nezahualcóyotl | Mexico | — |
| Olímpico Benito Juárez | 19,703 | Ciudad Juárez | Chihuahua | Juárez |
| Tamaulipas | 19,667 | Tampico & Ciudad Madero ^{Note A} | Tamaulipas | Tampico Madero |
| Universitario BUAP | 19,283 | Puebla City | Puebla | BUAP |
| 3 de Marzo | 18,779 | Zapopan | Jalisco | Tecos |
| Héroe de Nacozari | 18,747 | Hermosillo | Sonora | Sonora |
| Francisco Zarco | 18,000 | Durango City | Durango | Durango |
| Andrés Quintana Roo | 17,289 | Cancún | Quintana Roo | Atlante, Cancún |
| Mariano Matamoros | 16,000 | Xochitepec | Morelos | Atlético Cuernavaca |
| Carlos Iturralde | 15,087 | Mérida | Yucatán | Venados |
| Tecnológico de Oaxaca | 14,950 | Oaxaca City | Oaxaca | Oaxaca, Oaxaca, Tigres Dorados MRCI |
| Centenario | 14,800 | Cuernavaca | Morelos | Morelos |
| 10 de Diciembre | 14,500 | Ciudad Cooperativa Cruz Azul | Hidalgo | Cruz Azul Hidalgo |
| Francisco Villa | 13,820 | Zacatecas | Zacatecas | Zacatecas, UAZ |
| Juan N. López | 13,356 | La Piedad | Michoacán | La Piedad |
| Unidad Deportiva Acapulco | 13,000 | Acapulco | Guerrero | Guerrero |
| IAETAC | 13,000 | Tecomán | Colima | — |
| Arena Cora | 12,271 | Tepic | Nayarit | Tepic |
| Las Ánimas | 12,000 | Yahualica | Jalisco | — |
| Colima | 12,000 | Colima City | Colima | Palmeros |
| Olímpico Universitario de Colima | 11,812 | Colima City | Colima | UdeC |
| Centenario | 11,134 | Los Mochis | Sinaloa | Murciélagos, Pacific |
| Marte R. Gómez | 10,520 | Ciudad Victoria | Tamaulipas | UAT |
| Gregorio "Tepa" Gómez | 10,000 | Tepatitlán de Morelos | Jalisco | Tepatitlán |
| Ignacio López Rayón | 10,000 | Zitácuaro | Michoacán | Zitácuaro |
| Heriberto Jara Corona | 10,000 | Poza Rica | Veracruz | Poza Rica |
| Olímpico Sección 24 | 10,000 | Salamanca | Guanajuato | — |

== Monaco ==
| Stadium | Capacity | Tenants |
|---|---|---|
| Stade Louis II | 18,500 | AS Monaco |

== Mongolia ==
| Stadium | Capacity |
|---|---|
| National Sports Stadium | 12,500 |

== Montenegro ==
| Stadium | Capacity | Tenants |
|---|---|---|
| Pod Gorica Stadium | 17,000 | FK Budućnost Podgorica, Montenegro |
| Gradski Stadion Berane | 11,000 | FK Berane |
| Stadion Gradski | 10,800 | FK Sutjeska |

== Moldova ==
| Stadium | Capacity | Tenants |
|---|---|---|
| Sheriff Stadium | 14,300 | FC Sheriff |
| Zimbru Stadium | 10,500 | Moldova, FC Zimbru, FC Dacia Chișinău |

== Morocco ==
| Stadium | Capacity | Opened | City | Tenants |
|---|---|---|---|---|
| Ibn Batouta Stadium | 75,600 | 2011 | Tanger | IR Tanger |
| Prince Moulay Abdellah Stadium | 69,500 | 2025 | Rabat | AS FAR |
| Mohamed V Stadium | 45,891 | 1955 | Casablanca | Moroccan team Raja Casablanca; Wydad Casablanca |
| Adrar Stadium | 45,480 | 2013 | Agadir | Hassania Agadir |
| Marrakesh Stadium | 45,240 | 2011 | Marrakesh | KAC Marrakech |
| Fez Stadium | 45,000 | 2007 | Fez | Maghreb de Fès; Wydad de Fès |
| Larbi Zaouli Stadium | 30,000 | 1990 | Casablanca | Tihad Sportif Casablanca |
| Kenitra Municipal Stadium | 28,000 | 1941 | Kenitra | KAC Kenitra |
| Honneur Stadium | 25,000 | 1962 | Meknes | COD Meknès |
| Stade olympique de Rabat | 21,000 | 2025 | Rabat | |
| Larbi Benbarek Stadium | 20,000 | 1920 | Casablanca | Wydad Athletic Club |
| El Massira Stadium | 20,000 | 1936 | Safi | OC Safi |
| Honor Stadium | 19,000 | 1977 | Oujda | MC Oujda |
| Grand Stade d'Al Hoceima | 15,000 | 2023 | Al Hoceima | |
| Sheikh Mohamed Laghdaf Stadium | 15,000 | 1984 | Laayoune | JS Massira |
| Mimoun Al Arsi Stadium | 12,000 | 1950 | Al Hoceima | Chabab Rif Al Hoceima; Raja Al Hoceima |
| Moulay Hassan Stadium | 12,000 | | Rabat | FUS |
| Stade d'honneur | 12,000 | | Beni Mellal | Raja Beni Mellal |
| Stade Colonel Abdelkader Allam | 12,000 | | Sidi Kacem | Union Sidi Kacem |
| Stade Municipal | 10,300 | | Fquih Ben Salah | Union Fkih Bensaleh |
| Ben M'Hamed El Abdi Stadium | 10,000 | | El-Jadida | Difaa El Jadida |
| El Bachir Stadium | 10,000 | 1954 | Mohammedia | SCC Mohammédia |
| Al Inbiâate Stadium | 10,000 | | Agadir | Hassania Agadir |
| Stade Hassan-II | 10,000 | | Fez | Wydad of Fes |
| El Harti Stadium | 10,000 | 1930 | Marrakesh | Kawkab Marrakech; Amal Marrakech |
| Stade d'honneur de Settat | 10,000 | | Settat | RS Settat |
| Stade Tessema | 10,000 | | Casablanca | Raja Club Athletic |
| Berkane Municipal Stadium | 10,000 | 2014 | Berkane | RS Berkane |
| Stade municipal d'Oujda | 10,000 | | Oujda | US Musulmane d'Oujda; Union sportive d'Oujda; MC Oujda |
| Sidi Bernoussi Stadium | 10,000 | | Casablanca | Rachad Bernoussi |
| Père Jégo Stadium | 10,000 | | Casablanca | Racing Casablanca |
| Stade Municipal de Khenifra | 10,000 | | Khenifra | Chabab Atlas Khenifra |
| Stade d'honneur | 10,000 | | Settat | RS Settat |

== Mozambique ==
| Stadium | Capacity | City | Tenants |
|---|---|---|---|
| Estádio da Machava | 45,000 | Maputo | Clube Ferroviário de Maputo |
| Estádio do Zimpeto | 42,000 | Maputo | Mozambique national football team |
| Estádio do Maxaquene | 15,000 | Maputo | Clube de Desportos do Maxaquene |
| Estádio do Costa do Sol | 10,000 | Maputo | CD Costa do Sol |
| Estádio Municipal 1º de Maio | 10,000 | Lichinga | Futebol Clube de Lichinga |

== Myanmar ==
| Stadium | Capacity | City | Tenants |
|---|---|---|---|
| Thuwunna Stadium | 50,000 | Yangon | |
| Bogyoke Aung San Stadium | 40,000 | Yangon | |
| Mandalar Thiri Stadium | 30,000 | Mandalay | |
| Wunna Theikdi Stadium | 30,000 | Naypyidaw | |
| Bahtoo Memorial Stadium | 17,000 | Mandalay | |
| Paung Laung Stadium | 15,000 | Naypyidaw | Nay Pyi Taw F.C. |

== Namibia ==
| Stadium | Capacity | City | Tenants |
|---|---|---|---|
| Independence Stadium | 25,000 | Windhoek | Namibia national football team |
| Sam Nujoma Stadium | 10,300 | Windhoek | |

== Nepal ==
| Stadium | Capacity | City | Tenants | Year built | Ref. |
|---|---|---|---|---|---|
| Pokhara Rangasala | 16,500 | Pokhara, Gandaki | Nepal national football team and Pokhara Thunders | 2004 | |
| Dasharath Rangasala | 15,000 | Tripureshwor, Kathmandu | Boys Union Club, Brigade Boys Club, Himalayan Sherpa Club, Kathmandu Rayzrs FC, Machhindra FC and NRT | 1956 | |
| Narayani Stadium | 15,000 | Birgunj, Parsa | FC Chitwan | 1981 | |
| Sahid Rangasala | 15,000 | Biratnagar, Morang | Biratnagar City FC and Morang XI | 1969 | |
| Chyasal Stadium | 10,000 | Chyasal, Lalitpur | Chyasal Youth Club and Lalitpur City FC | 2002 | |
| Dhangadhi Stadium | 10,000 | Dhangadhi, Sudurpashchim | Dhangadhi FC | | |

== Netherlands ==
| Stadium | Capacity | Tenants |
|---|---|---|
| Amsterdam ArenA | 55,865 | Ajax |
| De Kuip | 51,177 | Feyenoord |
| Philips Stadion | 35,000 | PSV |
| Grolsch Veste | 30,206 | FC Twente |
| Abe Lenstra Stadion | 26,800 | sc Heerenveen |
| GelreDome | 25,000 | Vitesse |
| De Galgenwaard | 24,500 | FC Utrecht |
| Euroborg | 22,329 | FC Groningen |
| Olympisch Stadion | 22,288 | |
| Parkstad Limburg Stadion | 19,500 | Roda JC |
| AFAS Stadion | 19,478 | AZ |
| Rat Verlegh Stadion | 17,064 | NAC Breda |
| Bingoal Stadion | 15,000 | ADO Den Haag |
| Willem II Stadion | 14,700 | Willem II |
| MAC³PARK Stadion | 14,000 | PEC Zwolle |
| De Vijverberg | 12,600 | De Graafschap |
| De Goffert | 12,500 | NEC |
| Fortuna Sittard Stadion | 12,500 | Fortuna Sittard |
| Erve Asito | 12,080 | Heracles Almelo |
| Het Kasteel | 11,000 | Sparta Rotterdam |
| Cambuur Stadion | 10,400 | Cambuur |
| De Adelaarshorst | 10,000 | Go Ahead Eagles |
| De Geusselt | 10,000 | MVV |

== New Zealand ==
| Stadium | Capacity | City | Tenants |
|---|---|---|---|
| Eden Park | 50,000 | Auckland | |
| Hnry Stadium | 36,000 | Wellington | Wellington Phoenix |
| Forsyth Barr Stadium | 30,748 | Dunedin | |
| Mount Smart Stadium | 25,000 | Auckland | Auckland FC |
| North Harbour Stadium | 25,000 | Auckland | New Zealand national football team |

== Nicaragua ==
| Stadium | Capacity | Tenants |
|---|---|---|
| Estadio Nacional de Fútbol de Nicaragua | 20,000 | Nicaragua national football team, UNAN Managua |

== Niger ==
| Stadium | Capacity | City | Tenants |
|---|---|---|---|
| Stade Général Seyni Kountché | 50,000 | Niamey | Niger national football team |
| Stade municipal | 10,000 | Niamey | |
| Stade de Zinder | 10,000 | Zinder | |

== Nigeria ==
| Stadium | Capacity | City | State/Territory | Tenants | Ref |
|---|---|---|---|---|---|
| Moshood Abiola National Stadium | 60,491 | Abuja | FCT | Nigeria national football team | |
| Jos International Stadium | 60,000 | Jos | Plateau | | |
| Lagos National Stadium | 45,000 | Lagos | Lagos | | |
| Adokiye Amiesimaka Stadium | 38,000 | Port Harcourt | Rivers | | |
| Muhammadu Dikko Stadium | 35,000 | Katsina | Katsina | Katsina United F.C. | |
| Godswill Akpabio International Stadium | 30,000 | Uyo | Akwa Ibom | Akwa United | |
| Obafemi Awolowo Stadium | 25,000 | Ibadan | Oyo | | |
| Teslim Balogun Stadium | 24,325 | Surulere | Lagos | First Bank F.C. | |
| Nnamdi Azikiwe Stadium | 22,000 | Enugu | Enugu | Enugu Rangers | |
| Stephen Keshi Stadium | 22,000 | Asaba | Delta | | |
| Gateway Stadium | 20,000 | Ijebu-Ode | Ogun | FC Ebedei | |
| Warri Township Stadium | 20,000 | Warri | Delta | Warri Wolves F.C. | |
| Kwara State Stadium | 18,000 | Ilorin | Kwara | Kwara United F.C. ABS FC | |
| Ahmadu Bello Stadium | 16,000 | Kaduna | Kaduna | | |
| Enyimba International Stadium | 16,000 | Aba | Abia | Enyimba International F.C. | |
| Liberation Stadium | 16,000 | Port Harcourt | Rivers | Dolphins F.C. | |
| Sani Abacha Stadium | 16,000 | Kano | Kano | Kano Pillars F.C. | |
| UJ Esuene Stadium | 16,000 | Calabar | Cross River | Calabar Rovers | |
| Hadejia Stadium | 15,000 | Hadejia | Jigawa | Jigawa Golden Stars F.C. | |
| Abubakar Tafawa Balewa Stadium | 15,000 | Bauchi | Bauchi | Wikki Tourists | |
| Rwang Pam Stadium | 15,000 | Jos | Plateau | Plateau United; JUTH F.C. Mighty Jets | |
| Samuel Ogbemudia Stadium | 12,000 | Benin City | Edo | Bendel Insurance F.C. | |
| Pantami Stadium | 12,000 | | Gombe | Gombe United F.C. | |
| Jalingo City Stadium | 12,000 | Jalingo | Taraba | Taraba FC | |
| Ilaro Stadium | 12,000 | Ilaro | Ogun | Gateway United F.C. | |
| Abubakar Umar Memorial Stadium | 10,000 | Gombe | Gombe | Gombe United F.C. | |
| Akure Township Stadium | 10,000 | Akure | Ondo | Sunshine Stars F.C. | |
| Dan Anyiam Stadium | 10,000 | | Imo | Heartland F.C. | |
| El-Kanemi Stadium | 10,000 | Owerri | Borno | El-Kanemi Warriors | |
| Lekan Salami Stadium | 10,000 | Ibadan | Oyo | Shooting Stars FC | |
| MKO Abiola Stadium | 10,000 | Abeokuta | Ogun | Gateway United F.C. | |
| Mobolaji Johnson Arena | 10,000 | Lagos | Lagos | 1472 FC; First Bank FC; Ikorodu City FC; Julius Berger FC Prince Kazeem Eleku FC; Smart City FC; Sporting Lagos; Stationery Stores FC; Valiant FC | |
| Oshogbo Stadium | 10,000 | | Osun | Prime F.C. | |
| Sapele Stadium | 10,000 | Sapele | Delta | Bayelsa United F.C. | |
| Zaria Township Stadium | 10,000 | | Kaduna | Kaduna United F.C. | |
| Kano Pillars Stadium | 10,000 | Kano | Kano | Kano Pillars F.C. | |

== Northern Cyprus ==
| Stadium | Capacity |
|---|---|
| Atatürk Stadı | 28,000 |

== North Korea ==
| Stadium | Capacity | City | Tenants |
|---|---|---|---|
| Rungrado 1st of May Stadium | 114,000 | P'yŏngyang | April 25 (for international club matches); National team (very rarely used) |
| Kim Il-sung Stadium | 50,000 | P'yŏngyang | P'yŏngyang City, National team |
| Sunan Stadium | 40,000 | P'yŏngsŏng | - |
| Hamhŭng Stadium | 35,000 | Hamhŭng | Hamnam, Hamhŭng Railway |
| Kaesŏng Stadium | 35,000 | Kaesŏng | Kaesŏng City |
| Sariwŏn Youth Stadium | 35,000 | Sariwŏn | Rimyŏngsu |
| Namp'o Stadium | 30,000 | Namp'o | P'yŏngnam |
| Yanggakdo Stadium | 30,000 | P'yŏngyang | April 25, Sobaeksu |
| East Pyongyang Stadium | 30,000 | P'yŏngyang | - |
| Sinp'ung Stadium | 30,000 | Wŏnsan | Kangwŏn |
| Kimchaek Municipal Stadium | 30,000 | Kimch'aek | Wŏlmido |
| Haeju Stadium | 25,000 | Haeju | Hwangnam |
| Sŏsan Stadium | 25,000 | P'yŏngyang | - |
| Kanggye Stadium | 20,000 | Kanggye | Chagang |
| Rajin Stadium | 20,000 | Rasŏn | Sŏnbong |
| Hyesan Stadium | 18,640 | Hyesan | Ryanggang |
| October Stadium | 17,500 | Sinŭiju | Kigwancha, Amrokkang |
| Ch'ŏngjin Stadium | 15,000 | Ch'ŏngjin | Ch'andongja |
| City Stadium | 10,000 | P'yŏngyang | Kyŏnggong'ŏp |

== North Macedonia ==
| Stadium | Capacity | City | Tenants | Opened |
|---|---|---|---|---|
| Toše Proeski Arena | 36,460 | Skopje | Rabotnički, Vardar | 1947 |
| Stadion Goce Delčev | 15,000 | Prilep | Pobeda, 11 Oktomvri | 1941 |
| Ecolog Arena | 15,000 | Tetovo | Shkëndija | 1981 |
| Petar Miloševski Football Stadium | 10,000 | Bitola | Pelister | 1937 |

== Norway ==
| Stadium | Capacity | Tenants |
|---|---|---|
| Ullevaal Stadion | 28,000 | Norway |
| Lerkendal Stadion | 21,166 | Rosenborg |
| Brann Stadion | 18,500 | Brann |
| Intility Arena | 17,333 | Vålerenga |
| Viking Stadion | 16,500 | Viking |
| Bislett Stadion | 15,400 | Various |
| Sør Arena | 14,400 | Start |
| Skagerak Arena, formerly Odd Stadion or Falkum | 13,500 | Odd Grenland |
| Åråsen Stadion | 12,000 | Lillestrøm |
| Aker Stadion | 11,167 | Molde |
| Color Line Stadion | 11,000 | Aalesund |
| Fredrikstad Stadion | 10,500 | Fredrikstad |
| Alfheim Stadion | 10,000 | Tromsø |

== Oman ==
| Stadium | Capacity | City | Tenants | Year built | Ref. |
|---|---|---|---|---|---|
| Sultan Qaboos Stadium | 34,000 | Bawshar, Muscat | Oman national football team, Bosher Club | 1985 | |
| Al-Saada Stadium | 20,000 | Salalah | Dhofar Club, Al-Nasr SC | 2009 | |
| Sohar Regional Sports Complex Stadium | 19,000 | Sohar | Sohar SC | | |
| Al-Buraimi Sports Stadium | 17,000 | Al-Buraimi | Al-Nahda | | |
| Al-Rustaq Sports Complex Stadium | 17,000 | Rustaq | Al-Rustaq Club | | |
| Nizwa Sports Complex Stadium | 14,400 | Nizwa | Al-Khaburah Club | 1994 | |
| Al-Seeb Stadium | 14,000 | Seeb | Oman national football team, Al-Seeb Club | 2004 | |
| Royal Oman Police Stadium | 12,000 | Seeb | Oman Club | 1987 | |

== Pakistan ==
| Stadium | Capacity | City | Province | Tenants |
|---|---|---|---|---|
| Jinnah Sports Stadium | 48,900 | Islamabad | Islamabad Capital Territory | Pakistan national football team |
| People's Football Stadium | 40,000 | Karachi | Sindh | Pakistan national football team |
| Ayub National Stadium | 20,000 | Quetta | Balochistan | |
| Ibn-e-Qasim Bagh Stadium | 18,000 | Multan | Punjab | |
| Maulana Muhammad Ali Johar Ground | 15,000 | Karachi | Sindh | Karachi United |
| Qayyum Stadium | 15,000 | Peshawar | Khyber Pakhtunkhwa | |
| KPT Football Stadium | 15,000 | Karachi | Sindh | Karachi Port Trust |
| KMC Football Stadium | 15,000 | Karachi | Sindh | |
| Punjab Stadium | 10,000 | Lahore | Punjab | Pakistan national football team |
| Hyderabad Football Stadium | 10,000 | Hyderabad | Sindh, Pakistan | Hyderabad District Football Association |
| Qayyum Papa Stadium | 10,000 | Quetta | Balochistan | |

== Palestine ==
| Stadium | Capacity | City | Tenants |
|---|---|---|---|
| Dura International Stadium | 18,000 | Hebron | Shabab Yatta |
| Jericho International Stadium | 15,000 | Jericho | Hilal Areeha |
| Faisal Al-Husseini International Stadium | 12,500 | Al-Ram | Palestine national football team, Hilal Al-Quds Club |
| Palestine Stadium | 10,000 | Gaza City | |

== Panama ==
| Stadium | Capacity | Tenants |
|---|---|---|
| Estadio Rommel Fernández | 32,000 | Panama national football team, Tauro FC |

== Papua New Guinea ==
| Stadium | Capacity | City |
|---|---|---|
| Sir Hubert Murray Stadium | 25,000 | Port Moresby |
| Sir John Guise Stadium | 15,000 | Port Moresby |
| PNG Football Stadium | 14,800 | Port Moresby |

== Paraguay ==
| Stadium | Capacity | Tenants |
|---|---|---|
| Estadio Defensores del Chaco | 44,000 | Paraguay, Club Olimpia |
| Estadio General Pablo Rojas | 42,910 | Cerro Porteño |
| Estadio Feliciano Cáceres | 25,000 | Sportivo Luqueño |
| Monumental Río Parapití | 25,000 | Club 2 de Mayo |
| Estadio Antonio Oddone Sarubbi | 23,500 | 3 de Febrero |
| Estadio Osvaldo Domínguez Dibb | 22,000 | Club Olimpia |
| Estadio Dr. Nicolás Leoz | 15,000 | Libertad |
| Estadio Municipal de Carapegua | 12,000 | Sportivo Carapegua |

== Peru ==
| Stadium | Capacity | City | Tenants | Opened |
|---|---|---|---|---|
| Estadio Monumental "U" | 80,093 | Lima | Universitario | 2000 |
| Estadio Monumental de la UNSA | 60,370 | Arequipa | Melgar | 1995 |
| Estadio Nacional del Peru | 53,086 | Lima | Peru | 1952 |
| Estadio Garcilaso | 45,056 | Cusco | Cienciano; Cusco FC; Deportivo Garcilaso | 1950 |
| Estadio Alejandro Villanueva | 35,938 | Lima | Alianza Lima | 1974 |
| Estadio Universidad San Marcos | 32,000 | Lima | Universidad San Marcos | 1951 |
| Estadio Manuel Rivera Sanchez | 32,000 | Chimbote | José Gálvez | 2007 |
| Estadio de la UNA | 30,000 | Puno | Alfonso Ugarte de Puno | 2022 |
| Estadio Miguel Grau | 25,500 | Piura | Atletico Grau | 1958 |
| Estadio Mansiche | 25,036 | Trujillo | Carlos A. Mannucci; Universidad César Vallejo | 1946 |
| Estadio Heraclio Tapia | 25,000 | Huánuco | Alianza Universidad; León de Huánuco | 1972 |
| Estadio Official de Pucallpa | 25,000 | Pucallpa | Deportivo Hospital; UNU | 1997 |
| Estadio Max Agustín | 24,576 | Iquitos | Comerciantes FC CNI | 1942 |
| Estadio Elías Aguirre | 24,500 | Chiclayo | Juan Aurich | 1970 |
| Estadio 25 de Noviembre | 21,000 | Moquegua | Atlético Huracán; Credicoop San Cristóbal | 2009 |
| Estadio Joel Gutiérrez | 21,000 | Tacna | Coronel Bolognesi Alfonso Ugarte de Tacna | 1995 |
| Estadio Huancayo | 20,000 | Huancayo | Sport Huancayo; Sport Águila | 1962 |
| Estadio Mariano Melgar | 20,000 | Arequipa | Atlético Universidad; Aurora; Piérola; Sportivo Huracán | 1954 |
| Estadio E. Torres Belón | 20,000 | Puno | Alfonso Ugarte | 1963 |
| Estadio Jorge Basadre | 19,850 | Tacna | Alfonso Ugarte (Tacna); Coronel Bolognesi; Mariscal Miller | 1954 |
| Estadio Héroes de San Ramón | 18,465 | Cajamarca | UTC | 1942 |
| Estadio Guillermo Briceño Rosamedina | 18,030 | Juliaca | Deportivo Binacional | 1966 |
| Estadio Rosas Pampa | 18,000 | Huaraz | Sport Áncash | 1944 |
| Estadio Alberto Gallardo | 18,000 | Lima | Sporting Cristal; Universidad San Martín | 1961 |
| Estadio Municipal Carlos Vidaurre García | 18,000 | Tarapoto | Unión Comercio Unión Tarapoto | |
| Estadio Miguel Grau | 17,785 | Callao | Atlético Chalaco; Sport Boys | 1996 |
| Estadio Tupac Amaru | 15,230 | Cusco | Cusco FC | 2011 |
| Estadio José Picasso Peratta | 15,000 | Ica | Octavio Espinoza Estudiantes de Medicina | 2009 |
| Estadio Guillermo Briceño | 15,000 | Juliaca | Diablos Rojos | |
| Estadio Ciudad de Cumaná | 15,000 | Ayacucho | Ayacucho FC | 1974 |
| Estadio IPD de Moyobamba | 15,000 | Moyobamba | Unión Comercio | |
| Estadio Iván Elías Moreno | 13,773 | Lima | Deportivo Municipal Universidad de San Martín de Porres | 2002 |
| Estadio IPD de nuevo cajamarca | 12,000 | Nueva Cajamarca | Unión Comercio | 2017 |
| Estadio Campeones del 36 | 12,000 | Sullana | Alianza Atlético | 2014 |
| Estadio Juan Maldonado Gamarra | 12,000 | Cutervo | Comerciantes Unidos | 2014 |
| Estadio Daniel Alcides Carrión | 12,000 | Cerro de Pasco | Unión Minas | 1986 |
| Estadio Olimpico Jorge Cabanillas Cabrera | 11,000 | Huánuco | Alianza Universidad | 2018 |
| Estadio Los Chankas | 10,000 | Andahuaylas | Los Chankas José María Arguedas | 2013 |
| Estadio Municipal de Nasca | 10,000 | Ica | Defensor Zarumilla | 2013 |
| Estadio Monumental de Condebamba | 10,000 | Abancay | Deportivo Educación | 2003 |
| Estadio Andres Bedoya Diaz | 10,000 | Lima | Fútbol Club Killas | 2021 |

== Philippines ==
| Stadium | Capacity | City | Island group | Home team(s) |
|---|---|---|---|---|
| Governor Mariano Perdices Memorial Coliseum | 25,000 | Dumaguete | Visayas | |
| New Clark City Athletics Stadium | 20,000 | New Clark City | Luzon | 2019 Southeast Asian Games; United City |
| Philippine Sports Stadium | 20,000 | Ciudad de Victoria | Luzon | |
| Pelaéz Sports Complex | 20,000 | Cagayan de Oro | Mindanao | |
| Narciso Ramos Sports and Civic Center | 16,000 | Lingayen | Luzon | |
| Isabela Sports Complex | 15,500 | Ilagan | Luzon | |
| Marikina Sports Center | 15,000 | Marikina | Luzon | |
| PhilSports Football and Athletics Stadium | 15,000 | Pasig | Luzon | |
| Rizal Memorial Stadium | 12,873 | Manila | Luzon | Philippines national football team |
| Ferdinand E. Marcos Memorial Stadium | 12,000 | Laoag | Luzon | |
| Sorsogon Sports Arena | 12,000 | Sorsogon City | Luzon | |
| Joaquin F. Enriquez Memorial Stadium | 10,000 | Zamboanga City | Mindanao | |
| MSU Grandstand | 10,000 | Marawi | Mindanao | |
| Bren Z. Guiao Sports Complex and Convention Center | 10,000 | San Fernando | Luzon | |
| Panaad Stadium | 10,500 | Bacolod | Visayas | |

== Poland ==
| Stadium | Capacity | Tenants |
|---|---|---|
| Stadion Narodowy | 58,580 | Poland |
| Silesian Stadium | 55,211 | Poland |
| Poznań Stadium | 42,837 | Lech Poznań |
| Wrocław Stadium | 42,771 | Śląsk Wrocław |
| Gdańsk Stadium | 41,620 | Lechia Gdańsk |
| Henryk Reyman Municipal Stadium | 33,130 | Wisła Kraków |
| Polish Army Stadium | 31,103 | Legia Warszawa |
| Arena Zabrze | 28,236 | Górnik Zabrze |
| Białystok Municipal Stadium | 22,372 | Jagiellonia Białystok |
| Florian Krygier Municipal Stadium | 21,163 | Pogoń Szczecin |
| Zdzisław Krzyszkowiak Municipal Stadium | 20,559 | Zawisza Bydgoszcz |
| Władysław Król Municipal Stadium | 18,029 | ŁKS Łódź |
| Widzew Łódź Stadium | 18,018 | Widzew Łódź |
| Lubin Stadium | 16,086 | Zagłębie Lubin |
| Kielce Municipal Stadium | 15,500 | Korona Kielce |
| Arena Lublin | 15,247 | Motor Lublin |
| Tychy Municipal Stadium | 15,150 | GKS Tychy |
| Gdynia Municipal Stadium | 15,139 | Arka Gdynia, Bałtyk Gdynia |
| Bielsko-Biała Stadium | 15,076 | Podbeskidzie Bielsko-Biała |
| Arena Katowice | 15,048 | GKS Katowice |
| Józef Piłsudski Cracovia Stadium | 15,016 | Cracovia Kraków |
| Kazimierz Górski Stadium | 15,004 | Wisła Płock |
| Jaskółcze Gniazdo Municipal Stadium | 14,790 | Unia Tarnów |
| Gdańsk Sports Center Stadium | 11,811 | Lechia Gdańsk Ladies |
| Zagłębie Sports Park | 11,600 | Zagłębie Sosnowiec |
| MOSiR Stadium | 10,304 | KS ROW 1964 Rybnik |
| Piotr Wieczorek Municipal Stadium | 10,037 | Piast Gliwice |

== Portugal ==
| Stadium | Capacity | City | Tenants |
|---|---|---|---|
| Estádio da Luz | 68,100 | Lisbon | S.L. Benfica |
| Estádio José Alvalade | 52,095 | Lisbon | Sporting CP |
| Estádio do Dragão | 50,033 | Porto | FC Porto |
| Estádio Nacional | 37,593 | Oeiras | Portugal national football team |
| Estádio Municipal de Aveiro | 32,830 | Aveiro | S.C. Beira-Mar |
| Estádio Algarve | 30,305 | Faro | Louletano D.C. and S.C. Farense |
| Estádio Municipal de Braga | 30,286 | Braga | S.C. Braga |
| Estádio D. Afonso Henriques | 30,029 | Guimarães | Vitória S.C. |
| Estádio Cidade de Coimbra | 29,622 | Coimbra | Académica de Coimbra |
| Estádio do Bessa Século XXI | 28,263 | Porto | Boavista F.C. |
| Estádio 1º de Maio | 28,000 | Braga | S.C. Braga athletics |
| Estádio Dr. Magalhães Pessoa | 23,888 | Leiria | U.D. Leiria |
| Estádio Alfredo da Silva | 21,498 | Barreiro | G.D. Fabril |
| Estádio do Restelo | 19,856 | Lisbon | C.F. Os Belenenses |
| Estádio do Bonfim | 15,497 | Setúbal | Vitória F.C. |
| Estádio de São Miguel | 12,500 | Ponta Delgada | C.D. Santa Clara |
| Estádio Cidade de Barcelos | 12,046 | Barcelos | Gil Vicente F.C. |
| Estádio Municipal Dr. José Vieira de Carvalho | 12,000 | Maia | F.C. Maia |
| Estádio Municipal Dr. Alves Vieira | 11,500 | Torres Novas | C.D. Torres Novas |
| Estádio do Marítimo | 10,600 | Funchal | C.S. Marítimo |
| Estádio Municipal de Águeda | 10,000 | Águeda | R.D. Águeda |

== Qatar ==
| Stadium | Capacity | City | Tenants | Year built |
|---|---|---|---|---|
| Lusail Stadium | 88,966 | Lusail | | 2021 |
| Al Bayt Stadium | 68,895 | Al Khor | | 2021 |
| Khalifa International Stadium | 45,857 | Al Rayyan | Qatar national football team | 2017 (Note: Originally built in 1976; reconstructed in 2017) |
| Ahmad bin Ali Stadium | 45,032 | Al Rayyan | | 2020 |
| Education City Stadium | 44,667 | Al Rayyan | | 2020 |
| Al Thumama Stadium | 44,400 | Doha | | 2021 |
| Al Janoub Stadium | 44,325 | Al Wakrah | | 2019 |
| Stadium 974 | 44,089 | Doha | | 2021 |
| Thani bin Jassim Stadium | 21,872 | Al Rayyan | Al-Gharafa; Umm Salal | 2003 |
| Jassim bin Hamad Stadium | 13,030 | Al Rayyan | Al-Sadd | 2004 (Note: Originally built in 1975; reconstructed in 2004) |
| Hamad bin Khalifa Stadium | 12,000 | Doha | Al Ahli | 1986 |
| Grand Hamad Stadium | 12,000 | Doha | Al-Arabi | 1986 |
| Suheim bin Hamad Stadium | 12,000 | Doha | Qatar SC | 1986; 2003 |
| Al-Khor SC Stadium | 12,000 | Al Khor | Al-Kharaitiyat; Al Khor | 2011 |
| Saoud bin Abdulrahman Stadium | 12,000 | Al Wakrah | Al-Wakrah SC | 2003 |
| Qatar University Stadium | 10,000 | Doha | | |
| Abdullah bin Khalifa Stadium | 10,000 | Doha | Al-Duhail SC | 2013 |

== Romania ==
| Stadium | Capacity | Tenants |
|---|---|---|
| Arena Națională | 55,634 | Romania / FCSB |
| Stadionul Dan Păltinișanu | 33,000 | Politehnica Timișoara |
| Stadionul Municipal | 32,700 | CSM Medgidia |
| Stadionul Steaua | 31,254 | CSA Steaua |
| Stadionul Ion Oblemenco | 30,929 | Universitatea Craiova |
| Cluj Arena | 30,201 | Universitatea Cluj |
| Stadionul Dr. Constantin Radulescu | 28,000 | CFR Cluj |
| Stadionul Municipal | 28,000 | Building Drobeta Turnu-Severin |
| Stadionul Jiul | 25,000 | Jiul Petroșani |
| Stadionul Dunărea | 23,000 | Dunărea Galați |
| Stadionul Municipal | 20,000 | Laminorul Roman |
| Stadionul Municipal | 19,000 | Gloria Buzău |
| Stadionul Ilie Oană | 18,000 | Petrolul Ploiești |
| Stadionul Dumitru Sechelariu | 17,500 | FCM Bacãu |
| Stadionul Gheorghe Hagi | 15,520 | Farul Constanța |
| Stadionul Dealul Florilor | 15,500 | FC Baia Mare |
| Stadionul Nicolae Dobrin | 15,170 | FC Argeș Pitești |
| Stadionul Dinamo | 15,138 | Dinamo București |
| Stadionul Cotroceni | 14,542 | Progresul București |
| Superbet Arena-Giulești | 14,047 | Rapid București |
| Stadionul Regie | 13,000 | Sportul Studențesc |
| Stadionul Areni | 13,000 | Cetatea Suceava |
| Stadionul Municipal Sibiu | 12,363 | FC Hermannstadt |
| Stadionul Francisc von Neuman | 11,500 | UTA Arad |
| Stadionul Emil Alexandrescu | 10,500 | Politehnica Iași |
| Stadionul Astra | 10,000 | Astra Ploiești |

== Rwanda ==
| Stadium | Capacity | City | Tenants |
|---|---|---|---|
| Amahoro Stadium | 45,000 | Kigali | Rwanda national football team |
| Kigali Pelé Stadium | 22,000 | Kigali | APR FC, Rayon Sports |
| Stade Huye | 10,000 | Butare | |

== Russia ==
| Stadium | Capacity | City | Tenants |
|---|---|---|---|
| Luzhniki Stadium | 81,000 | Moscow | Russia national football team, FC Torpedo Moscow, 1980 Summer Olympics and 2018 World Cup |
| Krestovsky Stadium | 67,800 | Saint Petersburg | FC Zenit Saint Petersburg, 2017 Confederations Cup, 2018 World Cup and Euro 2020 |
| Fisht Olympic Stadium | 45,994 | Sochi | PFC Sochi; 2014 Winter Olympics, 2017 Confederations Cup and 2018 World Cup |
| Volgograd Arena | 45,568 | Volgograd | FC Rotor Volgograd, 2018 World Cup |
| Ak Bars Arena | 45,379 | Kazan | FC Rubin Kazan, 2017 Confederations Cup and 2018 World Cup |
| Lukoil Arena | 45,360 | Moscow | FC Spartak Moscow, 2017 Confederations Cup and 2018 World Cup |
| Rostov Arena | 45,000 | Rostov-on-Don | FC Rostov, 2018 World Cup |
| Cosmos Arena | 44,918 | Samara | FC Krylya Sovetov, 2018 World Cup |
| Strelka Stadium | 44,899 | Nizhny Novgorod | FC Nizhny Novgorod, 2018 World Cup |
| Mordovia Arena | 44,442 | Saransk | 2018 World Cup |
| Arena Baltika | 35,212 | Kaliningrad | FC Baltika Kaliningrad, 2018 World Cup |
| Krasnodar Stadium | 35,074 | Krasnodar | FC Krasnodar |
| Central Stadium | 35,061 | Yekaterinburg | FC Ural Sverdlovsk Oblast |
| Metallurg Stadium | 33,001 | Samara | FC Krylya Sovetov Samara (until 2018) |
| Republican Spartak Stadium | 32,464 | Vladikavkaz | Alania Vladikavkaz |
| Trade Unions Central Stadium | 31,793 | Voronezh | FC Fakel Voronezh |
| Kuban Stadium | 31,654 | Krasnodar | FC Kuban Krasnodar |
| Akhmat-Arena | 30,597 | Grozny | FC Terek Grozny |
| VEB Arena | 30,433 | Moscow | CSKA Moscow |
| Lokomotiv Stadium | 27,320 | Moscow | FC Lokomotiv Moscow |
| Anzhi-Arena | 26,400 | Kaspiysk | |
| VTB Arena | 26,319 | Moscow | FC Dynamo Moscow |
| Central Stadium | 25,400 | Kazan | FC Rubin Kazan (until 2014) |
| CSK Stadium | 25,000 | Ryazan | FC Ryazan |
| SKA SKVO Stadium | 25,000 | Rostov-on-Don | FC SKA Rostov-on-Don |
| Shinnik Stadium | 22,871 | Yaroslavl | FC Shinnik Yaroslavl |
| Central Stadium | 22,500 | Krasnoyarsk | FC Yenisey Krasnoyarsk |
| Petrovsky Stadium | 21,725 | Saint Petersburg | FC Zenit Saint Petersburg (until 2017) |
| Central Stadium | 21,500 | Astrakhan | FC Volgar Astrakhan |
| Arsenal Stadium | 20,048 | Tula | FC Arsenal Tula |
| Torpedo Stadium | 19,700 | Vladimir | FC Torpedo Vladimir |
| Central Republican Stadium | 19,100 | Izhevsk | FC Zenit-Izhevsk Izhevsk |
| Arena Khimki | 18,636 | Khimki | FC Khimki |
| Torpedo Stadium | 18,500 | Togliatti | FC Lada-Togliatti Togliatti |
| Lokomotiv Stadium | 17,856 | Nizhny Novgorod | FC Volga Nizhny Novgorod |
| Zvezda Stadium | 17,000 | Perm | FC Amkar Perm |
| Saturn Stadium | 16,500 | Ramenskoye | FC Saturn Moscow Oblast |
| Vanguard Stadium | 16,000 | Komsomolsk-on-Amur | FC Smena Komsomolsk-na-Amure |
| Dynamo Stadium | 16,000 | Barnaul | FC Dynamo Barnaul |
| Olimp-2 | 15,840 | Rostov-on-Don | FC Rostov (until 2018) |
| Dynamo Stadium | 15,589 | Stavropol | FC Dynamo Stavropol |
| Central Stadium | 15,292 | Oryol | FC Oryol |
| Dynamo Stadium | 15,200 | Makhachkala | FC Dynamo Makhachkala |
| Lenin Stadium | 15,200 | Khabarovsk | FC SKA-Energiya Khabarovsk |
| Lokomotiv Stadium | 15,200 | Saratov | FC Sokol Saratov |
| Neftyanik Stadium | 15,132 | Ufa | FC Ufa |
| PromAgro Stadium | 15,000 | Stary Oskol | FC Metallurg-Oskol Stary Oskol |
| Trud Stadium | 15,000 | Tomsk | FC Tom Tomsk |
| Central Stadium | 15,000 | Chelyabinsk | FC Chelyabinsk |
| Metallurg Stadium | 14,940 | Lipetsk | FC Metallurg Lipetsk |
| Baltika Stadium | 14,660 | Kaliningrad | FC Baltika Kaliningrad |
| Spartak Stadium | 14,545 | Petrozavodsk | FC Karelia Petrozavodsk |
| Spartak Stadium | 14,149 | Nalchik | PFC Spartak Nalchik |
| Amur Stadium | 13,500 | Blagoveshchensk | FC Amur-2010 Blagoveshchensk |
| Uralmash Stadium | 13,500 | Yekaterinburg | FC Ural Sverdlovsk Oblast |
| Eduard Streltsov Stadium | 13,450 | Moscow | FC Torpedo Moscow |
| Trade Unions Central Stadium | 13,400 | Murmansk | FC Sever Murmansk |
| Geolog Stadium | 13,057 | Tyumen | FC Tyumen |
| Trud Stadium | 12,500 | Novorossiysk | FC Chernomorets Novorossiysk |
| Spartak Stadium | 12,500 | Novosibirsk | FC Novosibirsk |
| Salyut Stadium | 11,456 | Belgorod | FC Salyut Belgorod |
| Metallurg Stadium | 11,000 | Lipetsk | FC Metallurg Lipetsk |
| Dynamo Stadium | 10,200 | Vladivostok | FC Dynamo Vladivostok |
| Slava Metreveli Central Stadium | 10,200 | Sochi | |
| Dynamo Stadium | 10,100 | Bryansk | FC Dynamo Bryansk |
| Gazovik Stadium | 10,046 | Orenburg | FC Orenburg |

== Saint Vincent and the Grenadines ==
| Stadium | Capacity | City | Tenants |
|---|---|---|---|
| Arnos Vale Stadium | 18,000 | Arnos Vale | Saint Vincent and the Grenadines national football team |

== Samoa ==
| Stadium | Capacity | City |
|---|---|---|
| Apia Park | 12,000 | Apia |

== Saudi Arabia ==
| Stadium | Capacity | City | Tenants |
|---|---|---|---|
| King Fahd Sports City Stadium | 92,000 | Riyadh | |
| King Abdullah Sports City Stadium | 65,000 | Jeddah | Al-Ahli, Al-Ittihad |
| King Abdulaziz Sports City Stadium | 38,000 | Mecca | Al-Wehda |
| Prince Abdullah Al-Faisal Sports City Stadium | 27,000 | Jeddah | Al-Ahli, Al-Ittihad |
| Kingdom Arena Stadium | 26,000 | Riyadh | Al-Hilal |
| Prince Mohamed bin Fahd Stadium | 26,000 | Dammam | Ettifaq FC |
| King Saud University Stadium | 25,000 | Riyadh | Al-Nassr |
| King Abdullah Sport City Stadium | 25,000 | Buraidah | Al-Raed, Al-Taawoun |
| Prince Mohammed bin Abdulaziz Sports City Stadium | 24,000 | Medina | Ohod Club, Al-Ansar FC |
| Prince Faisal bin Fahd Sports City Stadium | 22,500 | Riyadh | Al-Shabab, Al-Hilal |
| King Fahd Sports City Stadium | 20,000 | Al Hawiyah | Wej SC |
| Prince Sultan bin Abdul Aziz Stadium | 20,000 | Abha | Abha Club, Damac FC |
| Prince Abdullah bin Jalawi Sport City | 20,000 | Al-Hasa | Al-Fateh SC |
| Al-Ettifaq Club Stadium | 15,000 | Khobar | Ettifaq FC |
| Al-Shabab Club Stadium | 15,000 | Riyadh | Al-Shabab |
| Prince Abdulaziz bin Musa'ed Sports City Stadium | 12,250 | Ha'il | Al-Tai |
| King Saud Sport City Stadium | 12,000 | Al Bahah | Al-Ain, Al-Hejaz |
| King Faisal Sport City Stadium | 12,000 | Jizan | Hetten FC, Al-Tahami FC |
| King Khalid Sport City Stadium | 12,000 | Tabuk | Al-Watani Club, Al-Suqoor FC |
| Prince Hathloul bin Abdulaziz Sports City Stadium | 12,000 | Qatif | Al-Khaleej FC, Mudhar Club |
| Prince Saud bin Jalawi Sports City Stadium | 11,358 | Khobar | Al-Qadsiah |
| Al-Fateh SC Stadium | 11,000 | Al-Mubarraz | Al-Fateh SC |
| Prince Mohammed bin Abdullah Al Faisal Stadium | 10,000 | Jeddah | Al-Ahli |
| Prince Nayef bin Abdulaziz Sports City Stadium | 10,000 | Najran | Al Okhdood Club, Najran SC |
| Najran University Stadium | 10,000 | Najran | Najran SC |

== Senegal ==
| Stadium | Capacity | City | Tenants |
|---|---|---|---|
| Diamniadio Olympic Stadium | 50,000 | Dakar | Senegal national team |
| Stade Léopold Sédar Senghor | 40,000 | Dakar | |
| Stade de Diaraf | 15,000 | Dakar | Djaraf |
| Stade Demba Diop | 15,000 | Dakar | ASC Jeanne d'Arc, Djaraf, AS Douanes, US Gorée, ASC Niarry Tally, US Ouakam |
| Stade Alboury Niaye | 15,000 | Louga | ASEC Ndjambour |
| Stade Aline Sitoe Diatta | 10,000 | Ziguinchor | Casa Sports |
| Stade Municipal de Richard Toll | 10,000 | Richard-Toll | AS Sucrière de La Réunion |

== Serbia ==
| Stadium | Capacity | Tenants |
|---|---|---|
| Red Star Stadium | 55,000 | FK Red Star Belgrade, Serbia |
| Partizan Stadium | 32,710 | FK Partizan |
| Subotica City Stadium | 28,000 | FK Spartak |
| Omladinski Stadium | 25,000 | OFK Beograd |
| Čika Dača Stadium | 22,058 | FK Radnički Kragujevac |
| Karađorđev Park Stadium | 18,700 | FK Banat Zrenjanin |
| Fortress Stadium | 17,200 | FK Smederevo |
| Stadium of Vojvodina | 15,745 | FK Vojvodina Novi Sad |
| Novi Pazar City Stadium | 15,000 | FK Novi Pazar |
| Stadium Voždovac | 12,500 | FK Voždovac |
| Stadion Bežanije | 10,000 | FK Bežanija |
| Čačak Stadium | 10,000 | FK Borac Čačak |
| Zemun Stadium | 10,000 | FK Zemun |

== Seychelles ==
| Stadium | Capacity | City | Tenants |
|---|---|---|---|
| Stad Linite | 10,000 | Victoria | Seychelles national football team |

== Sierra Leone ==
| Stadium | Capacity | City | Tenants |
|---|---|---|---|
| Siaka Stevens National Stadium | 45,000 | Freetown | Sierra Leone national football team East End Lions; Kallon; Mighty Blackpool; Old Edwardians; Ports Authority |

== Singapore ==
| Stadium | Capacity | Tenants |
|---|---|---|
| National Stadium | 55,000 | Singapore |

== Slovakia ==
| Stadium | Capacity | Tenants |
|---|---|---|
| Tehelné pole | 22,500 | ŠK Slovan Bratislava, Slovakia National Football Team |
| Štadión Antona Malatinského | 19,200 | FC Spartak Trnava |
| DAC Stadion | 16,410 | FC DAC 1904 Dunajská Streda |
| Štadión Pasienky | 11,591 | ŠK Slovan Bratislava |
| Štadión pod Zoborom | 11,384 | FC Nitra |
| Štadión pod Dubňom | 11,181 | MŠK Žilina |
| Chemlon Stadion | 10,000 | 1. HFC Humenné |
| SNP Stadium | 10,000 | FK Dukla Banská Bystrica |

== Slovenia ==
| Stadium | Capacity | City | Tenants | Opened |
|---|---|---|---|---|
| Stožice Stadium | 16,038 | Ljubljana | Olimpija Ljubljana, Bravo | 2010 |
| Stadion Z'dežele | 13,059 | Celje | Celje | 2003 |
| Ljudski vrt | 11,709 | Maribor | Maribor | 1952 |

== Solomon Islands ==
| Stadium | Capacity | City | Tenants |
|---|---|---|---|
| Pacific Games Stadium | 10,000 | Honiara | Solomon Islands national football team |

== Somalia ==
| Stadium | Capacity | City | Tenants |
|---|---|---|---|
| Mogadishu Stadium | 65,000 | Mogadishu | Somalia national football team |
| Hargeisa Stadium | 30,000 | Hargeisa | |
| Eng. Yariisow Stadium | 20,000 | Mogadishu | |
| Horseed Stadium | 10,000 | Horseed | |

== South Africa ==
| Stadium | Capacity | City | Tenants |
|---|---|---|---|
| FNB Stadium | 94,736 | Johannesburg | Kaizer Chiefs F.C.; South Africa national soccer team |
| Ellis Park Stadium | 62,567 | Johannesburg | |
| Cape Town Stadium | 55,000 | Cape Town | Cape Town City F.C. |
| Moses Mabhida Stadium | 55,000 | Durban | AmaZulu F.C. (2009–) |
| Kings Park Stadium | 54,000 | Durban | |
| Loftus Versfeld Stadium | 51,762 | Pretoria | Mamelodi Sundowns F.C. |
| Nelson Mandela Bay Stadium | 46,000 | Gqeberha | Chippa United |
| Royal Bafokeng Stadium | 44,530 | Phokeng | |
| Mbombela Stadium | 43,500 | Mbombela | TS Galaxy |
| Free State Stadium | 42,000 | Bloemfontein | |
| Peter Mokaba Stadium | 41,733 | Polokwane | Polokwane City; Sekhukhune United |
| Orlando Stadium | 40,000 | Orlando | Orlando Pirates F.C. |
| Johannesburg Stadium | 37,500 | Johannesburg | |
| Charles Mopeli Stadium | 35,000 | Phuthaditjhaba | |
| Athlone Stadium | 34,000 | Cape Town | Cape Town Spurs |
| Olympia Park | 30,000 | Rustenburg | |
| Rand Stadium | 30,000 | Johannesburg | |
| Lucas Moripe Stadium | 28,900 | Pretoria | SuperSport United F.C.; Mamelodi Sundowns F.C. |
| Independence Stadium | 25,000 | Mthatha | Umtata Bush Bucks |
| PAM Brink Stadium | 25,000 | Springs | |
| Vosloorus Stadium | 25,000 | Ekurhuleni | |
| Dobsonville Stadium | 24,000 | Johannesburg | |
| Oppenheimer Stadium | 23,000 | Orkney | |
| Chatsworth Stadium | 22,000 | Durban | Durban City |
| Adcock Stadium | 20,000 | Gqeberha | |
| Bellville Stadium | 20,000 | Cape Town | |
| Botshabelo Stadium | 20,000 | Botshabelo | Botshabelo F.C., Tower United F.C. |
| Giyani Stadium | 20,000 | Giyani | |
| Goble Park | 20,000 | Qwa Qwa | |
| Moruleng Stadium | 20,000 | Moruleng | |
| Pilditch Stadium | 20,000 | Pretoria | |
| Seisa Ramabodu Stadium | 20,000 | Bloemfontein | |
| Thohoyandou Stadium | 20,000 | Thohoyandou | Black Leopards, Venda |
| Germiston Stadium | 18,000 | Germiston | |
| Griqua Park | 18,000 | Kimberley | Hungry Lions, United FC |
| Sisa Dukashe Stadium | 17,000 | Mdantsane | |
| Buffalo City Stadium | 16,000 | East London | |
| Witbank Stadium | 15,000 | Witbank | Witbank Spurs F.C. (2010) |
| Iscor Stadium | 15,000 | Sebokeng | Vaal Professionals |
| KaNyamazane Stadium | 15,000 | Nelspruit | Mbombela United F.C., Thabo All Stars F.C. |
| Makhulong Stadium | 15,000 | Durban | |
| Old Peter Mokaba Stadium | 15,000 | Polokwane | Polokwane City F.C., Magesi |
| Ruimsig Stadium | 15,000 | Johannesburg | |
| Sinaba Stadium | 15,000 | Benoni | |
| Seshego Stadium | 15,000 | Polokwane | |
| Eldorado Park Stadium | 12,000 | Johannesburg | FC AK |
| Harry Gwala Stadium | 12,000 | Pietermaritzburg | Royal AM |
| Investec Milpark Stadium | 12,000 | Johannesburg | Wits University |
| Princess Magogo Stadium | 12,000 | Durban | Milford |
| Ackerville Stadium | 11,000 | Witbank | Calaska F.C. |
| King Zwelithini Stadium | 10,000 | Durban | Lamontville Golden Arrows |
| Philippi Stadium | 10,000 | Cape Town | |
| Silvermine Stadium | 10,000 | Cape Town | Avendale Athletico |
| Themba Sinamela Stadium | 10,000 | eMalahleni | |

== South Korea ==
| Stadium | Capacity | Tenants |
|---|---|---|
| Seoul Olympic Stadium | 69,950 | |
| Seoul World Cup Stadium | 66,806 | FC Seoul |
| Daegu Stadium | 66,422 | |
| Busan Asiad Stadium | 56,000 | |
| Incheon Munhak Stadium | 52,200 | |
| Ulsan Munsu Football Stadium | 44,102 | Ulsan HD FC |
| Gwangju World Cup Stadium | 44,118 | Gwangju FC |
| Suwon World Cup Stadium | 43,959 | Suwon Samsung Bluewings |
| Jeonju World Cup Stadium | 42,400 | Jeonbuk Hyundai Motors |
| Jeju World Cup Stadium | 42,256 | Jeju United |
| Goyang Stadium | 42,055 | Goyang Kookmin Bank |
| Daejeon World Cup Stadium | 40,400 | Daejeon Citizen |
| Bucheon Stadium | 35,803 | Bucheon FC 1995 |
| Ansan Wa~ Stadium | 35,000 | Ansan H FC |
| Chuncheon Civic Stadium | 35,000 | — |
| Gumi Civic Stadium | 35,000 | — |
| Incheon Civic Stadium | 35,000 | — |
| Masan Stadium | 35,000 | — |
| Paju Public Stadium | 35,000 | Paju Citizen |
| Uijeongbu Stadium | 35,000 | — |
| Duryu Park Stadium | 32,500 | — |
| Cheonan Baekseok Stadium | 32,000 | — |
| Suwon Civic Stadium | 32,000 | Suwon City |
| Dongdaemun Stadium | 30,000 | — |
| Daejeon Hanbat Stadium | 30,000 | Daejeon KHNP |
| Gimcheon Stadium | 30,000 | — |
| Gimhae Stadium | 30,000 | Gimhae City |
| Jecheon Stadium | 30,000 | — |
| Jeju Stadium | 30,000 | — |
| Jeonju Stadium | 30,000 | — |
| Sangju Stadium | 30,000 | Sangju Sangmu Phoenix |
| Changwon Civic Stadium | 27,085 | — |
| Seongnam 1 Stadium | 27,000 | formerly Seongnam Ilhwa Chunma |
| Tancheon Sports Complex | 27,000 | Seongnam Ilhwa Chunma |
| Cheonan Stadium | 26,000 | — |
| Anyang Stadium | 25,000 | formerly Anyang LG Cheetahs |
| Pohang Steel Yard | 25,000 | Pohang Steelers |
| Busan Gudeok Stadium | 24,363 | Busan Transportation Corporation FC |
| Sungui Stadium | 24,000 | formerly Incheon Korail |
| Incheon Football Stadium | 20,891 | Incheon United |
| Chuncheon Stadium | 20,000 | Chuncheon FC |
| Gangneung Stadium | 20,000 | Gangwon FC, Gangneung City |
| Icheon City Stadium | 20,000 | formerly Icheon Hummel Korea |
| Hyochang Stadium | 18,000 | formerly Seoul United |
| Cheongju Stadium | 17,264 | Cheongju Jikji FC |
| Changwon Football Center | 15,500 | Gyeongnam FC, Changwon City |
| Gwangyang Stadium | 14,284 | Chunnam Dragons |
| Haman Stadium | 10,000 | — |
| Gimpo City Stadium | 10,000 | formerly Ansan H FC |
| Seosan City Stadium | 10,000 | formerly Seosan Citizen |

== South Sudan ==
| Stadium | Capacity | City | Tenants |
|---|---|---|---|
| Juba Stadium | 10,000 | Juba | South Sudan national football team Atlabara FC; Al-Malakia FC; Al-Salam FC |

== Spain ==
| Stadium | Capacity | City | Autonomous community | Tenants | Inaugurated |
|---|---|---|---|---|---|
| Camp Nou | 99,354 | Barcelona | Catalonia | Barcelona | 1957 |
| Santiago Bernabéu | 83,186 | Madrid | Madrid | Real Madrid | 1947 |
| La Cartuja | 71,374 | Seville | Andalusia | None | 1999 |
| Metropolitano | 70,813 | Madrid | Madrid | Atlético Madrid | 1994 |
| Benito Villamarín | 60,721 | Seville | Andalusia | Real Betis | 1929 |
| Lluís Companys | 55,926 | Barcelona | Catalonia | Barcelona | 1927 |
| San Mamés | 53,331 | Bilbao | Basque Country | Athletic Bilbao | 2013 |
| Mestalla | 49,430 | Valencia | Valencia | Valencia | 1923 |
| Ramón Sánchez Pizjuán | 42,714 | Seville | Andalusia | Sevilla | 1957 |
| RCDE Stadium | 40,500 | Cornellà de Llobregat | Catalonia | Espanyol | 2009 |
| Anoeta Stadium | 40,000 | San Sebastián | Basque Country | Real Sociedad | 1993 |
| La Romareda | 33,608 | Zaragoza | Aragon | Zaragoza | 1957 |
| Riazor | 32,660 | A Coruña | Galicia | Deportivo de La Coruña | 1944 |
| Gran Canaria | 32,400 | Las Palmas | Canary Islands | Las Palmas | 2003 |
| Martínez Valero | 31,388 | Elche | Valencia | Elche | 1976 |
| Nueva Condomina | 31,179 | Murcia | Murcia | Murcia | 2006 |
| Carlos Tartiere | 30,500 | Oviedo | Asturias | Oviedo | 2000 |
| La Rosaleda | 30,044 | Málaga | Andalusia | Málaga | 1941 |
| El Molinón | 29,371 | Gijón | Asturias | Sporting Gijón | 1908 |
| Balaídos | 29,000 | Vigo | Galicia | Celta Vigo | 1928 |
| José Zorrilla | 27,846 | Valladolid | Castile and León | Valladolid | 1982 |
| Ciutat de València | 26,354 | Valencia | Valencia | Levante | 1969 |
| Son Moix | 26,020 | Palma | Balearic Islands | Mallorca | 1999 |
| Nuevo Mirandilla | 25,033 | Cádiz | Andalusia | Cádiz | 1955 |
| José Rico Pérez | 24,704 | Alicante | Valencia | Hércules | 1974 |
| El Sadar | 23,576 | Pamplona | Navarre | Osasuna | 1967 |
| La Cerámica | 23,000 | Villarreal | Valencia | Villarreal | 1923 |
| Heliodoro Rodríguez López | 22,824 | Santa Cruz de Tenerife | Canary Islands | Tenerife | 1925 |
| El Sardinero | 22,222 | Santander | Cantabria | Racing Santander | 1988 |
| Nuevo Colombino | 21,670 | Huelva | Andalusia | Recreativo | 2001 |
| Power Horse Stadium | 21,350 | Almería | Andalusia | Almería | 2004 |
| Nuevo Arcángel | 20,989 | Córdoba | Andalusia | Córdoba | 1994 |
| Chapín | 20,523 | Jerez de la Frontera | Andalusia | Xerez | 1988 |
| Mendizorrotza | 19,840 | Vitoria-Gasteiz | Basque Country | Alavés | 1924 |
| Los Cármenes | 19,336 | Granada | Andalusia | Granada | 1995 |
| Carlos Belmonte | 17,524 | Albacete | Castile-La Mancha | Albacete | 1960 |
| Coliseum | 17,393 | Getafe | Madrid | Getafe | 1998 |
| El Helmántico | 17,341 | Villares de la Reina | Castile and León | Salamanca CF | 1970 |
| Estadio Municipal | 16,120 | La Línea de la Concepción | Andalusia | Linense | 1969 |
| Las Gaunas | 15,902 | Logroño | La Rioja (Spain) | UD Logroñés; Logroño | 2002 |
| Nuevo Vivero | 15,198 | Badajoz | Extremadura | Badajoz | 1998 |
| Cartagonova | 15,105 | Cartagena | Murcia | Cartagena | 1987 |
| Romano | 14,600 | Mérida | Extremadura | Mérida | 1954 |
| Nou Estadi | 14,591 | Tarragona | Catalonia | Gimnàstic | 1972 |
| Campo de Fútbol de Vallecas | 14,505 | Madrid | Madrid | Rayo Vallecano | 1976 |
| Castàlia | 14,485 | Castellón de la Plana | Valencia | Castellón | 1987 |
| El Soto | 14,000 | Móstoles | Madrid | Móstoles | 1981 |
| Camp d'Esports | 13,500 | Lleida | Catalonia | Lleida Esportiu | 1918 |
| Juan Rojas | 13,468 | Almería | Andalusia | Almería (rugby) | 1976 |
| Montilivi | 13,450 | Girona | Catalonia | Girona | 1970 |
| Reino de León | 13,346 | León | Castile and León | Cultural Leonesa | 2001 |
| El Plantío | 12,642 | Burgos | Castile and León | Burgos; Real Burgos | 1964 |
| La Victoria | 12,569 | Jaén | Andalusia | Jaén | 2001 |
| Butarque | 12,450 | Leganés | Madrid | Leganés | 1998 |
| Nacional Complutense | 12,400 | Madrid | Madrid | Cisneros (rugby) | 1943 |
| A Malata | 12,042 | Ferrol | Galicia | Racing Ferrol | 1993 |
| Verónica Boquete de San Lázaro | 12,000 | Santiago de Compostela | Galicia | Compostela | 1993 |
| Nova Creu Alta | 11,981 | Sabadell | Catalonia | Sabadell | 1967 |
| Francisco de la Hera | 11,580 | Almendralejo | Extremadura | Extremadura | 1996 |
| Olímpic de Terrassa | 11,500 | Terrassa | Catalonia | Terrassa | 1960 |
| Ciudad de Tudela | 11,000 | Tudela | Navarre | Tudelano | 1969 |
| Ciudad de Málaga | 10,816 | Málaga | Andalusia | Athletics | 2006 |
| Pasarón | 10,500 | Pontevedra | Galicia | Pontevedra | 1965 |
| Linarejos | 10,000 | Linares | Andalusia | Linares | 1956 |
| Las Mestas | 10,000 | Gijón | Asturias | Gijón Mariners (American football); CSI Gijón (horse jumping) | 1942 |

== Sri Lanka ==
| Stadium | Capacity | City | Tenants |
|---|---|---|---|
| Sugathadasa Stadium | 25,000 | Colombo | Sri Lanka national football team, Colombo FC, Renown SC |

== Sudan ==
| Stadium | City | Capacity | Tenants |
|---|---|---|---|
| Al-Merrikh Stadium | Omdurman | 43,000 | Al-Merrikh SC |
| Al-Hilal Stadium | Omdurman | 25,000 | Al-Hilal Club |
| Khartoum Stadium | Khartoum | 23,000 | Khartoum NC |
| Nyala Olympic Stadium | Nyala | 20,000 | |
| Port Sudan Stadium | Port Sudan | 20,000 | Hay al-Arab, Hilal al-Sahil |
| Wad Madani Stadium | Wad Madani | 15,000 | Al-Ittihad SC |
| Atbara Stadium | Atbara | 15,000 | Al-Amal SC |
| Al-Merghani Kassala Stadium | Kassala | 11,000 | |

== Sweden ==
| Stadium | Capacity | Tenants |
|---|---|---|
| Strawberry Arena | 55 000 | Sweden men's national football team |
| Ullevi | 43 200 | IFK Göteborg, GAIS |
| 3Arena | 30 000 | Djurgårdens IF, Hammarby IF |
| Malmö Stadion | 27 500 | |
| Stadion | 24 000 | Malmö FF |
| Gamla Ullevi | 20 000 | Sweden women's national football team |
| Idrottsparken | 19,414 | IFK Norrköping |
| Borås Arena | 17 800 | IF Elfsborg, Norrby IF |
| Olympia | 17 200 | Helsingborgs IF |
| Söderstadion | 16 197 | Hammarby IF |
| Örjans vall | 15 000 | Halmstads BK, IS Halmia |
| Stora Valla | 15 000 | Degerfors IF |
| Behrn Arena | 14 500 | Örebro SK, KIF Örebro |
| Stockholms stadion | 14 417 | Djurgårdens IF |
| Ryavallen | 11 000 | |
| Landskrona IP | 10 500 | Landskrona BoIS |
| Arosvallen | 10 000 | Västerås SK |
| Tingvalla IP | 10 000 | Carlstad United |

== Switzerland ==
| Stadium | Capacity | City | Tenants |
|---|---|---|---|
| St. Jakob-Park | 38,512 | Basel | FC Basel |
| Stade de Suisse | 31,783 | Bern | BSC Young Boys |
| Stade de Genève | 30,084 | Lancy | Servette FC |
| Letzigrund | 26,104 | Zürich | FC Zürich, Grasshopper Club Zürich |
| kybunpark | 19,694 | St. Gallen | FC St. Gallen |
| Swissporarena | 16,800 | Lucerne | FC Luzern |
| Stade Tourbillon | 16,263 | Sion | FC Sion |
| Stade Olympique de la Pontaise | 15,786 | Lausanne | FC Lausanne-Sport; FC Stade Lausanne-Ouchy |
| Stade de la Charrière | 12,700 | La Chaux-de-Fonds | FC La Chaux-de-Fonds |
| Stade de la Tuilière | 12,544 | Lausanne | FC Lausanne-Sport |
| Stade de la Maladière | 11,998 | Neuchâtel | Neuchâtel Xamax |
| Stadion Neufeld | 11,500 | Bern | FC Bern |
| Stadio Comunale | 11,168 | Chiasso | FC Chiasso |
| Stadio Lido | 11,000 | Locarno | FC Locarno |
| Stadion Brühl | 10,964 | Grenchen | FC Grenchen |
| Stockhorn Arena | 10,398 | Thun | FC Thun |

== Syria ==
| Stadium | Capacity | City | Tenants | Opened |
|---|---|---|---|---|
| Aleppo International Stadium | 53,200 | Aleppo | none | 2007 |
| Latakia Sports City Stadium | 45,000 | Latakia | Tadamon | 1987 |
| Khalid ibn al-Walid Stadium | 32,000 | Homs | Al-Karamah; Al-Wathba | 1960 |
| Abbasiyyin Stadium | 30,000 | Damascus | Al-Wahda; Al-Jaish; Al-Majd | 1957 |
| Al-Assad Stadium | 28,000 | Latakia | Tishreen, Hutteen | 1978 |
| Bassel al-Assad Stadium | 25,000 | Al-Hasakah | Al-Jazeera | 1999 |
| Bassel al-Assad Stadium | 25,000 | Homs | Al-Karamah, Al-Wathba | 2000 |
| Hama Municipal Stadium | 22,000 | Hama | Taliya, Nawair | 1958 |
| Raqqa Municipal Stadium | 20,000 | Raqqa | Al-Forat, Al-Shabab | 2006 |
| Al-Ittihad Stadium | 20,000 | Aleppo | Al-Ittihad | |
| Bassel al-Assad Stadium | 18,000 | Daraa | Al-Shoulah | 1998 |
| Bassel al-Assad Stadium | 18,000 | As-Suwayda | none | 2013 |
| Baniyas Municipal Stadium | 15,000 | Baniyas | Baniyas Refinery, Baniyas | 2011 |
| Al-Hamadaniah Stadium | 15,000 | Aleppo | Al-Ittihad, Al-Hurriya, Afrin | 1986 |
| Qardaha Municipal Stadium | 13,000 | Qardaha | Qardaha | |
| Deir ez-Zor Municipal Stadium | 13,000 | Deir ez-Zor | Al-Fotuwa, Al-Yaqdhah | 1960 |
| Al-Fayhaa Stadium | 12,000 | Damascus | Syrian national team, Al-Jaish | 1976 |
| Tishreen Stadium | 12,000 | Damascus | Al-Shorta | 1976 |
| 7 April Stadium | 12,000 | Aleppo | Al-Yarmouk, Jalaa, Ommal Aleppo, Shorta Aleppo | 1948 |
| Al-Jalaa Stadium | 10,000 | Damascus | Al-Wahda | 1976 |
| Ri'ayet al-Shabab Stadium | 10,000 | Aleppo | Al-Herafyeen, Ouroube | 1965 |
| 7 April Stadium | 10,000 | Qamishli | Al-Jehad | |
| Al-Baath Stadium | 10,000 | Jableh | Jableh | 1990 |
| Bassel al-Assad Stadium | 10,000 | Tartus | Al-Sahel | 1993 |

== Taiwan ==
| Stadium | Capacity | City | Tenants |
|---|---|---|---|
| National Stadium | 55,000 | Kaohsiung | Chinese Taipei national football team |
| Tainan Municipal Xinying Stadium | 30,000 | Tainan | |
| Taipei Municipal Stadium | 20,000 | Taipei | Chinese Taipei national football team, Taipei Bravo |
| Hualien Stadium | 12,800 | Hualien | |

== Football stadiums in Tajikistan ==
| Stadium | City | Capacity | Tenants |
|---|---|---|---|
| National Stadium | Dushanbe | 30,000 | Tajikistan national football team |
| 20 Years of Independence Stadium | Khujand | 25,000 | FC Khujand |
| Vose’ District Central Stadium | Hulbuk | 21,000 | Khatlon Region |
| Langari Langarieva Stadium | Kulob | 20,000 | Ravshan Kulob |
| Pamir Stadium | Dushanbe | 20,000 | Istiklol; CSKA Pamir Dushanbe |
| Istaravshan Stadium | Istaravshan | 18,000 | |
| TALCO Arena | Tursunzoda | 13,770 | |
| Central Stadium | Bokhtar | 10,000 | FC Khatlon; Tajik Telecom Qurghonteppa |

== Tanzania ==
| Stadium | Capacity | City | Tenants |
|---|---|---|---|
| National Stadium Tanzania | 60,000 | Dar es Salaam | National team, Simba SC, Young Africans FC |
| CCM Kirumba Stadium | 35,000 | Mwanza | Mbao FC, Alliance Schools FC, Pamba F.C., Toto African |
| Kambarage Stadium | 30,000 | Shinyanga | Kahama United |
| Jamhuri Stadium Dodoma | 30,000 | Dodoma | JKT Ruvu Stars |
| Gombani Stadium | 30,000 | Chake-Chake | |
| Maji-Maji Stadium | 30,000 | Songea | |
| Jamhuri Stadium Morogoro | 20,000 | Morogoro | Moro United F.C. |
| Uhuru Stadium | 23,000 | Dar es Salaam | Young Africans S.C., Simba S.C., JKT Ruvu Stars, Ruvu Shooting |
| Sheikh Amri Abeid Memorial Stadium | 20,000 | Arusha | Arusha F.C., JKT Oljoro FC |
| Lake Tanganyika Stadium | 20,000 | Kigoma | Reli F.C. |
| Ali Hassan Mwinyi Stadium | 20,000 | Tabora | Rhino Rangers |
| Sokoine Stadium | 20,000 | Mbeya | Prisons FC, Mbeya City |
| Amaan Stadium | 15,000 | Unguja | Unguja KMKM FC, Miembeni S.C., Mlandege S.C. |
| Mkwakwani Stadium | 15,000 | Tanga | Coastal Union F.C., African Sports, JKT Mgambo |
| Chamazi Stadium | 10,000 | Dar es Salaam | Azam F.C. |

== Thailand ==
| Stadium | Capacity | City | Tenants | Opened |
|---|---|---|---|---|
| Rajamangala Stadium | 48,000 | Bangkok | Thailand national football team | 1998 |
| Chang Arena | 32,600 | Buriram | Buriram United | 2011 |
| Suphanburi Municipality Stadium | 25,000 | Suphanburi | Suphanburi | 1947 |
| Dhupatemiya Stadium | 25,000 | Pathumthani | Royal Thai Air Force | |
| Chira Nakhon Stadium | 25,000 | Songkhla | | 1944 |
| 80th Birthday Stadium | 24,641 | Nakhon Ratchasima | Nakhon Ratchasima | 2007 |
| Thai Army Sports Stadium | 20,000 | Bangkok | | 2012 |
| Chulalongkorn University Stadium | 20,000 | Bangkok | Chamchuri United | |
| IPE Bangkok Stadium | 20,000 | Pathum Thani | Pathum Thani United | |
| Tinsulanon Stadium | 20,000 | Songkhla | Songkhla | 1995 |
| Suphachalasai Stadium | 19,793 | Bangkok | Thailand national football team | 1935 |
| Thammasat Stadium | 19,500 | Pathumthani | Bangkok United, Dome | 1998 |
| 700th Anniversary Stadium | 17,909 | Chiangmai | Chiangmai United | 1995 |
| SCG Stadium | 15,000 | Nonthaburi | Muangthong United | 1998 |
| PTT Stadium | 15,000 | Rayong | PTT Rayong | 2012 |
| United Stadium of Chiangrai | 15,000 | Chiangrai | Chiangrai United | 2012 |
| Surakul Stadium | 15,000 | Phuket | Phuket City | |
| Phichit Stadium | 15,000 | Phichit | Phichit | |
| Nakhon Sawan Stadium | 15,000 | Nakhon Sawan | Nakhon Sawan | |
| Elephant Stadium | 15,000 | Surin | | 2002 |
| Khao Kradong Stadium | 14,000 | Buriram | | 2010 |
| BG Stadium | 10,114 | Pathumthani | BG Pathum United, Rangsit | 2010 |
| Kleab Bua Stadium | 13,000 | Kanchanaburi | Muangkan United | 2009 |
| Mitr Phol Stadium | 13,000 | Ratchaburi | Ratchaburi Mitr Phol | 2016 |
| Sattahip Navy Stadium | 12,500 | Chonburi | Navy, Royal Thai Fleet | 2001 |
| PAT Stadium | 12,308 | Bangkok | Port, BCC | 1967 |
| Nong Bua Lamphu Province Stadium | 12,000 | Nong Bua Lam Phu | Nong Bua Pitchaya | |
| Chainat Stadium | 12,000 | Chainat | Chainat Hornbill | 2011 |
| IPE Chonburi Stadium | 12,000 | Chonburi | Phan Thong | 2010 |
| Surat Thani Stadium | 10,175 | Surat Thani | Surat Thani | |
| Ang Thong Provincial Stadium | 10,000 | Ang Thong | Ang Thong | |
| 72-years Anniversary Stadium | 10,000 | Bangkok | Thai Honda Ladkrabang | 2010 |
| Ratchaburi Stadium | 10,000 | Ratchaburi | | |
| Sri Nakhon Lamduan Stadium | 10,000 | Sisaket | Sisaket, Sisaket United | |
| Nonthaburi Province Stadium | 10,000 | Nonthaburi | Nonthaburi | 2016 |
| Tung Burapha Stadium | 10,000 | Ubon Ratchathani | | |
| SAT Stadium Udon Thani | 10,000 | Udon Thani | Udon Thani | 2018 |

== Togo ==
| Stadium | Capacity | City | Tenants |
|---|---|---|---|
| Stade de Kégué | 25,000 | Lomé | Togo national football team |
| Stade omnisport de Lomé | 20,000 | Lomé | |
| Stade Général Eyadema | 15,000 | Lomé | |
| Stade Municipal | 10,000 | Kara | ASKO Kara |
| Stade Municipal | 10,000 | Kpalimé | Gomido FC |
| Stade Municipal | 10,000 | Sokodé | AC Semassi FC |

== Tonga ==
| Stadium | Capacity | City |
|---|---|---|
| Teufaiva Sport Stadium | 10,000 | Nukuʻalofa |

== Trinidad and Tobago ==
| Stadium | Capacity | Tenants |
|---|---|---|
| Hasely Crawford Stadium | 22,575 | Trinidad and Tobago national football team, San Juan Jabloteh F.C. |
| Ato Boldon Stadium | 10,000 | |
| Larry Gomes Stadium | 10,000 | |
| Manny Ramjohn Stadium | 10,000 | |

== Tunisia ==
| Stadium | Capacity | Tenants |
|---|---|---|
| Stade Olympique de Radès | 60,000 | Tunisia |
| Stade Olympique de Sousse | 50,000 | ES Sahel |
| Stade El Menzah | 45,000 | Club Africain, ES Tunis |
| Stade Mustapha Ben Jannet | 22,000 | US Monastir |
| Stade 15 Octobre | 20,000 | CA Bizertin |
| Stade Chadly Zouiten | 18,000 | Stade Tunisien |
| Stade Municipal de Gabès | 15,000 | Stade Gabèsien, AS Gabès |
| Stade Ali Zouaoui | 15,000 | JS Kairouan |
| Stade Municipal de Hammam-Lif | 15,000 | CS Hammam-Lif |
| Stade Taïeb Mhiri | 12,600 | CS Sfaxien |
| Stade Boujemaa Kmiti | 10,000 | Olympique Béja |
| Stade du 7-Mars | 10,000 | US Ben Guerdane |
| Stade Jlidi | 10,000 | ES Zarzis |

== Turkey ==
| Stadium | Capacity | City | Tenants | Opened |
|---|---|---|---|---|
| Atatürk Olympic Stadium | 74,753 | Istanbul | Turkey, Fatih Karagümrük S.K. | 2002 |
| Rams Park | 52,280 | Istanbul | Galatasaray S.K. | 2011 |
| İzmir Atatürk Stadium | 51,337 | İzmir | Karşıyaka S.K. | 1971 |
| Şükrü Saracoğlu Stadium | 50,530 | Istanbul | Fenerbahçe S.K. | 1908 |
| Centennial Atatürk Stadium | 43,361 | Bursa | Bursaspor | 2015 |
| Beşiktaş Stadium | 42,590 | Istanbul | Beşiktaş J.K. | 2016 |
| Konya Metropolitan Municipality Stadium | 42,276 | Konya | Konyaspor | 2014 |
| Şenol Güneş Sports Complex | 40,782 | Trabzon | Trabzonspor | 2017 |
| Kocaeli Stadium | 34,169 | Izmit | Kocaelispor | 2017 |
| Samsun 19 Mayıs Stadium | 33,919 | Samsun | Samsunspor | 2017 |
| Gaziantep Stadium | 33,502 | Gaziantep | Gaziantepspor, Gazişehir Gaziantep F.K. | 2017 |
| New Adana Stadium | 33,000 | Adana | Adanaspor, Adana Demirspor | 2021 |
| Diyarbakır Stadium | 33,000 | Diyarbakır | Amed S.K., Diyarbekirspor | 2018 |
| Kadir Has Stadium | 32,864 | Kayseri | Kayserispor | 2009 |
| Antalya Stadium | 32,537 | Antalya | Antalyaspor | 2015 |
| New Eskişehir Stadium | 32,500 | Eskişehir | Eskişehirspor | 2016 |
| Şanlıurfa GAP Stadium | 28,965 | Şanlıurfa | Şanlıurfaspor | 2009 |
| New Sakarya Stadium | 28,113 | Adapazarı | Sakaryaspor | 2017 |
| New Sivas 4 Eylül Stadium | 27,532 | Sivas | Sivasspor | 2016 |
| New Malatya Stadium | 25,745 | Malatya | Yeni Malatyaspor | 2017 |
| Mersin Arena | 25,497 | Mersin | Mersin İdman Yurdu | 2013 |
| Ay-Yıldız Stadium | 25,000 | Karabük | Kardemir Karabükspor | 2014 |
| New Hatay Stadium | 25,000 | Antakya | Hatayspor | 2021 |
| Çotanak Stadyumu | 21,500 | Giresun | Giresunspor | 2021 |
| Kazım Karabekir Stadium | 21,374 | Erzurum | Erzurumspor F.K. | 2011 |
| Eryaman Stadium | 20,560 | Ankara | Gençlerbirliği, Ankaragücü | 2019 |
| Gürsel Aksel Stadium | 19,713 | İzmir | Göztepe SK | 2020 |
| Denizli Atatürk Stadium | 18,745 | Denizli | Denizlispor | 1950 |
| Elazığ Atatürk Stadium | 18,423 | Elazığ | Elazığspor | 2023 |
| Yenikent Stadium | 18,029 | Ankara | Osmanlıspor | 1974 |
| Başakşehir Fatih Terim Stadium | 17,156 | Istanbul | Başakşehir FK | 2014 |
| New Ordu Stadium | 16,768 | Ordu | Orduspor | 2021 |
| Manisa 19 Mayıs Stadium | 16,066 | Manisa | Manisaspor | 2009 |
| Zeytinburnu Stadium | 16,000 | Istanbul | Zeytinburnuspor | 1984 |
| Gebze Alaettin Kurt Stadium | 15,462 | Gebze | Gebzespor | 1995 |
| Rize City Stadium | 15,332 | Rize | Rizespor | 2009 |
| Gazi Mustafa Kemal Atatürk Stadium | 15,000 | Tire | Tire 1922 Spor | 2018 |
| New Çorum Stadium | 15,000 | Çorum | Yeni Çorumspor | 2019 |
| Batman Arena | 15,000 | Batman | Batman Petrolspor | 2018 |
| Alsancak Mustafa Denizli Stadium | 15,000 | İzmir | Altay SK, Altınordu F.K. | 2021 |
| Zafer Stadium | 14,558 | Afyonkarahisar | Afjet Afyonspor | 2014 |
| Burdur Mehmet Akif Ersoy Üniversity Stadium | 14,500 | Burdur | Yeni Burdurspor | 2021 |
| Recep Tayyip Erdoğan Stadium | 13,856 | Istanbul | Kasımpaşa | 2005 |
| Kemal Köksal Stadium | 13,795 | Zonguldak | Zonguldak Kömürspor | 1940 |
| Balıkesir Atatürk Stadium | 13,732 | Balıkesir | Balıkesirspor | 1953 |
| Erzincan 13 Şubat Şehir Stadium | 12,981 | Erzincan | 24 Erzincanspor | 2022 |
| Bandırma 17 Eylül Stadium | 12,725 | Bandırma | Bandırmaspor | 1995 |
| Doğanlar Stadium | 12,500 | İzmir | Altınordu F.K. | 2017 |
| Akhisar Stadium | 12,139 | Akhisar | Akhisar Belediyespor | 2018 |
| Dr. Necmettin Şeyhoğlu Stadium | 11,378 | Karabük | Kardemir Karabükspor | 2014 |
| Adnan Menderes Stadium | 11,988 | Aydın | Aydınspor 1923 | 1950 |
| Alanya Oba Stadium | 10,842 | Alanya | Alanyaspor | 2011 |
| 18 Mart Stadium | 10,500 | Çanakkale | Çanakkale Dardanelspor | |
| Ünye İlçe Stadium | 10,340 | Ünye | Ünyespor | |
| Artvin Şehir Stadium | 10,000 | Artvin | Artvin Murgulspor | |
| Vali Lütfü Yiğenoğlu Stadium | 10,000 | Ağrı | Ağrıspor | |

== Turkmenistan ==
| Stadium | Capacity | City | Tenants |
|---|---|---|---|
| Saparmurat Turkmenbashy Olympic Stadium | 45,000 | Ashgabat | |
| Köpetdag Stadium | 26,503 | Ashgabat | FK Köpetdag Aşgabat |
| Ashgabat Stadium | 20,000 | Ashgabat | FC Ashgabat; FC Altyn Asyr; Ahal FK; Turkmenistan national football team |
| Sport Toplumy Stadium | 10,000 | Balkanabat | Balkan FK |
| Arkadag Stadium | 10,000 | Arkadag | FK Arkadag |

== Uganda ==
| Stadium | Capacity | Tenants | Date built |
|---|---|---|---|
| Mandela National Stadium | 45,202 | Uganda national football team | 1997 |
| Nakivubo Stadium | 15,000 | | 1926 |
| St. Mary's Stadium | 15,000 | Vipers SC | 2017 |

== Ukraine ==
| Stadium | Capacity | Build/renovated | City | Tenants |
|---|---|---|---|---|
| Olympic National Sports Complex Stadium | 70,050 | | Kyiv | FC Dynamo Kyiv |
| Donbas Arena | 52,518 | | Donetsk | |
| Metalist Stadium | 40,003 | | Kharkiv | FC Metalist Kharkiv |
| Arena Lviv | 34,915 | | Lviv | |
| Chornomorets Stadium | 34,164 | | Odesa | FC Chornomorets Odesa |
| Shakhtar Stadium | 31,718 | 2000 | Donetsk | |
| Dnipro Arena | 31,003 | | Dnipropetrovsk | Dnipro 1 |
| Ukraina Stadium | 27,925 | 2000 | Lviv | FC Karpaty Lviv |
| RSC Olympic Stadium | 26,100 | 2003 | Donetsk | |
| Yuvileiny Stadium | 25,830 | | Sumy | FC Viktoriya Sumy |
| Butovsky Vorskla Stadium | 24,795 | 2000 | Poltava | FC Vorskla Poltava |
| Meteor Stadium | 24,381 | 2001 | Dnipro | FC VPK-Ahro Shevchenkivka |
| Avanhard Stadium | 22,320 | 2003 | Luhansk | FC Zorya Luhansk |
| Shukhevych City Stadium | 15,150 | 2011 | Ternopil | FC Nyva Ternopil |
| Valeriy Lobanovskyi Dynamo Stadium | 16,873 | | Kyiv | |
| Central City Stadium | 15,600 | 2019 | Mykolaiv | MFC Mykolaiv |
| Zirka Stadium | 13,305 | 2014 | Kropyvnytskyi | FC Zirka Kropyvnytskyi |
| Volodymyr Boiko Stadium | 12,680 | 2001 | Mariupol | FC Mariupol |
| Avanhard Stadium | 12,080 | 2015 | Lutsk | FC Volyn Lutsk |
| Yuri Gagarin Stadium | 12,060 | | Chernihiv | FC Desna Chernihiv |
| Avanhard Stadium | 12,000 | 2005 | Uzhhorod | FC Uzhhorod |
| Bukovyna Stadium | 12,000 | | Chernivtsi | FSC Bukovyna Chernivtsi |
| Slavutych Arena | 11,983 | 2006 | Zaporizhia | MFC Metalurh Zaporizhia |
| Cherkasy Arena | 10,321 | 2011 | Cherkasy | FC Dnipro Cherkasy |

== United Arab Emirates ==
| Stadium | Capacity | City | Emirate | Tenants | Ref. |
|---|---|---|---|---|---|
| Zayed Sports City Stadium | 44,250 | Abu Dhabi | Abu Dhabi | United Arab Emirates national football team | |
| Mohammed bin Zayed Stadium | 42,056 | Abu Dhabi | Abu Dhabi | Al Jazira Club | |
| Hazza bin Zayed Stadium | 25,965 | Al Ain | Abu Dhabi | Al Ain FC | |
| Sharjah Stadium | 18,578 | Sharjah | Sharjah | Al-Sharjah SCC | |
| Maktoum bin Rashid Al Maktoum Stadium | 18,000 | Dubai | Dubai | Al Shabab | |
| Sheikh Khalifa International Stadium | 16,000 | Al Ain | Abu Dhabi | | |
| Tahnoun bin Mohammed Stadium | 15,000 | Al Ain | Abu Dhabi | Al Ain FC | |
| Al-Maktoum Stadium | 12,000 | Dubai | Dubai | Al-Nasr Dubai SC | |
| Al Nahyan Stadium | 12,000 | Abu Dhabi | Abu Dhabi | Al-Wahda F.C. | |
| Al-Rashid Stadium | 12,000 | Dubai | Dubai | Al-Ahli Dubai F.C. | |
| Ajman Stadium | 10,000 | Ajman | Ajman | Ajman Club | |
| Khalid bin Mohammed Stadium | 10,000 | Sharjah | Sharjah | Al-Sharjah SCC | |

== United Kingdom ==
=== England ===
| Stadium | Capacity | City | Tenants | Other sports / events |
|---|---|---|---|---|
| Wembley Stadium | 90,000 | London | England national football team | Rugby league, Rugby union, Gaelic Football & Hurling, American football, Boxing, Professional wrestling |
| Old Trafford | 74,310 | Trafford | Manchester United F.C. | Rugby league |
| Tottenham Hotspur Stadium | 62,850 | London | Tottenham Hotspur F.C. | American football, Boxing, Rugby Union, Rugby League |
| London Stadium | 62,500 | London | West Ham United F.C., British Athletics | Athletics, rugby league, rugby union, baseball, 2012 Summer Olympics, 2012 Summer Paralympics |
| Anfield | 61,015 | Liverpool | Liverpool F.C. | |
| Emirates Stadium | 60,260 | London | Arsenal F.C. | |
| Etihad Stadium | 53,400 | Manchester | Manchester City F.C. | 2002 Commonwealth Games |
| Everton Stadium | 52,769 | Liverpool | Everton F.C. | |
| St James' Park | 52,404 | Newcastle upon Tyne | Newcastle United F.C. | Rugby league, rugby union |
| Stadium of Light | 48,339 | Sunderland | Sunderland A.F.C. | |
| Villa Park | 42,573 | Birmingham | Aston Villa F.C. | |
| Stamford Bridge | 41,841 | London | Chelsea F.C. | |
| Goodison Park | 40,394 | Liverpool | Everton W.F.C. | |
| Hillsborough Stadium | 39,732 | Sheffield | Sheffield Wednesday F.C. | |
| Elland Road | 37,890 | Leeds | Leeds United F.C. | Rugby league |
| Riverside Stadium | 34,742 | Middlesbrough | Middlesbrough F.C. | |
| Pride Park Stadium | 33,597 | Derby | Derby County F.C. | |
| Bramall Lane | 32,702 | Sheffield | Sheffield United F.C. | |
| St Mary's Stadium | 32,689 | Southampton | Southampton F.C. | |
| Coventry Building Society Arena | 32,609 | Coventry | Coventry City F.C. | |
| King Power Stadium | 32,500 | Leicester | Leicester City F.C. | |
| Molineux Stadium | 32,050 | Wolverhampton | Wolverhampton Wanderers F.C. | |
| Falmer Stadium | 31,800 | Brighton | Brighton & Hove Albion F.C. | |
| Ewood Park | 31,367 | Blackburn | Blackburn Rovers F.C. | |
| City Ground | 30,602 | Nottingham | Nottingham Forest F.C. | |
| Stadium MK | 30,500 | Milton Keynes | Milton Keynes Dons F.C. | |
| Bet365 Stadium | 30,183 | Stoke-on-Trent | Stoke City F.C. | |
| Portman Road | 29,673 | Ipswich | Ipswich Town F.C. | |
| University of Bolton Stadium | 28,723 | Bolton | Bolton Wanderers F.C. | Rugby league |
| Carrow Road | 27,244 | Norwich | Norwich City F.C. | |
| The Valley | 27,111 | London | Charlton Athletic F.C. | |
| Ashton Gate | 27,000 | Bristol | Bristol City F.C., Bristol Rugby | Rugby union |
| The Hawthorns | 26,688 | West Bromwich | West Bromwich Albion F.C. | |
| Selhurst Park | 26,309 | London | Crystal Palace F.C. | |
| Craven Cottage | 25,700 | London | Fulham F.C. | |
| MKM Stadium | 25,586 | Kingston upon Hull | Hull City A.F.C., Hull F.C. | Rugby |
| DW Stadium | 25,138 | Wigan | Wigan Warriors, Wigan Athletic F.C. | Rugby league |
| Valley Parade | 25,136 | Bradford | Bradford City A.F.C. | |
| The Darlington Arena | 25,000 | Darlington | Darlington F.C., Darlington Mowden Park R.F.C. | Rugby union |
| Kirklees Stadium | 24,500 | Huddersfield | Huddersfield Town F.C., Huddersfield Giants | Rugby league |
| Madejski Stadium | 24,161 | Reading | Reading F.C. | |
| Deepdale | 23,408 | Preston | Preston North End F.C. | |
| Oakwell | 23,009 | Barnsley | Barnsley F.C. | |
| Turf Moor | 22,546 | Burnley | Burnley F.C. | |
| Vicarage Road | 21,977 | Watford | Watford F.C. | |
| Fratton Park | 20,899 | Portsmouth | Portsmouth F.C. | |
| Meadow Lane | 20,211 | Nottingham | Notts County F.C. | |
| The Den | 20,146 | London | Millwall F.C. | |
| Home Park | 19,500 | Plymouth | Plymouth Argyle F.C. | |
| Vale Park | 19,052 | Stoke-on-Trent | Port Vale F.C. | |
| St Andrew's | 18,600 | Birmingham | Birmingham City F.C. | |
| Loftus Road | 18,200 | London | Queens Park Rangers F.C. | |
| Brentford Community Stadium | 17,250 | London | Brentford FC, London Irish | Rugby union |
| Prenton Park | 16,789 | Birkenhead | Tranmere Rovers F.C. | |
| Brunton Park | 16,651 | Carlisle | Carlisle United F.C. | |
| Bloomfield Road | 16,220 | Blackpool | Blackpool F.C. | |
| London Road Stadium | 15,460 | Peterborough | Peterborough United F.C. | |
| Eco-Power Stadium | 15,231 | Doncaster | Doncaster Rovers F.C., Doncaster | Rugby league |
| The Shay | 14,061 | Halifax | FC Halifax Town, Halifax | Rugby league |
| Boundary Park | 13,500 | Oldham | Oldham Athletic A.F.C. | |
| Kassam Stadium | 12,500 | Oxford | Oxford United F.C. | Rugby union |
| Roots Hall | 12,392 | Southend-on-Sea | Southend United F.C. | |
| Craven Park | 12,225 | Kingston upon Hull | Hull Kingston Rovers | Rugby league |
| New York Stadium | 12,021 | Rotherham | Rotherham United F.C. | |
| Gateshead International Stadium | 11,800 | Gateshead | Gateshead F.C., Gateshead Senators | Athletics, rugby league, American football |
| Gigg Lane | 11,669 | Bury | Bury F.C. | |
| Priestfield Stadium | 11,582 | Gillingham | Gillingham F.C. | |
| Kenilworth Road | 11,500 | Luton | Luton Town F.C. | |
| Dean Court | 11,329 | Bournemouth | A.F.C. Bournemouth | |
| Bescot Stadium | 11,300 | Walsall | Walsall F.C. | |
| Edgeley Park | 10,852 | Stockport | Stockport County F.C. | |
| SMH Group Stadium | 10,379 | Chesterfield | Chesterfield F.C. | |
| Sincil Bank | 10,307 | Lincoln | Lincoln City F.C. | |
| Spotland Stadium | 10,249 | Rochdale | Rochdale A.F.C., Rochdale Hornets | Rugby league |
| Kingston Park | 10,200 | Newcastle upon Tyne | Newcastle Falcons, Newcastle Thunder, Newcastle United W.F.C. | Rugby union, rugby league |
| Alexandra Stadium | 10,153 | Crewe | Crewe Alexandra F.C. | |
| Adams Park | 10,000 | High Wycombe | Wycombe Wanderers F.C., | |
| Field Mill | 10,000 | Mansfield | Mansfield Town F.C. | |
| Colchester Community Stadium | 10,000 | Colchester | Colchester United F.C. | |

=== Northern Ireland ===
| Stadium | Capacity | Tenants |
|---|---|---|
| The Oval | 26,556 | Glentoran F.C. |
| Windsor Park | 12,950 | Linfield, Northern Ireland |

=== Scotland ===
| Stadium | Capacity | Tenants |
|---|---|---|
| Celtic Park | 60,411 | Celtic |
| Hampden Park | 51,866 | Queen's Park and Scotland |
| Ibrox Stadium | 51,700 | Rangers |
| Pittodrie Stadium | 20,866 | Aberdeen |
| Easter Road | 20,421 | Hibernian |
| Tynecastle Park | 19,852 | Heart of Midlothian |
| Rugby Park | 15,003 | Kilmarnock |
| Tannadice Park | 14,223 | Dundee United |
| Fir Park | 13,677 | Motherwell |
| Cappielow Park | 11,589 | Greenock Morton |
| Dens Park | 11,775 | Dundee |
| East End Park | 11,480 | Dunfermline Athletic |
| McDiarmid Park | 10,696 | St Johnstone |
| Somerset Park | 10,185 | Ayr United |
| Firhill Stadium | 10,102 | Partick Thistle |
| New Broomfield | 10,101 | Airdrieonians |

=== Wales ===
| Stadium | Capacity | Tenants |
|---|---|---|
| Millennium Stadium | 74,500 | Wales |
| Cardiff City Stadium | 26,828 | Cardiff City |
| Swansea.com Stadium | 20,520 | Swansea City |
| Racecourse Ground | 15,500 | Wrexham |

== United States ==
| Stadium | Capacity | City | State | Year opened | Type | Tenants |
|---|---|---|---|---|---|---|
| Michigan Stadium | 107,601 | Ann Arbor | Michigan | 1927 | Football | Michigan Wolverines (NCAA) |
| Ohio Stadium | 102,780 | Columbus | Ohio | 1922 | Football | Ohio State Buckeyes (NCAA) |
| Sanford Stadium | 92,746 | Athens | Georgia | 1929 | Football | Georgia Bulldogs (NCAA) |
| Rose Bowl | 92,542 | Pasadena | California | 1922 | Football | UCLA Bruins (NCAA); Rose Bowl Game (NCAA) |
| Cotton Bowl | 92,100 | Dallas | Texas | 1930 | Football | Red River Rivalry (NCAA); State Fair Classic (NCAA) |
| MetLife Stadium | 82,500 | East Rutherford | New Jersey | 2010 | Football | New York Giants (NFL); New York Jets (NFL) |
| Lambeau Field | 81,441 | Green Bay | Wisconsin | 1957 | Football | Green Bay Packers (NFL) |
| AT&T Stadium | 80,000 | Arlington | Texas | 2009 | Football | Dallas Cowboys (NFL); Cotton Bowl Classic (NCAA); Big 12 Championship Game (NCAA) |
| Los Angeles Memorial Coliseum | 77,500 | Los Angeles | California | 1923 | Football, Motorsports | USC Trojans (NCAA) |
| GEHA Field at Arrowhead Stadium | 76,416 | Kansas City | Missouri | 1972 | Football | Kansas City Chiefs (NFL) |
| Empower Field | 76,125 | Denver | Colorado | 2001 | Football | Denver Broncos (NFL) |
| Bank of America Stadium | 74,867 | Charlotte | North Carolina | 1996 | Football | Carolina Panthers (NFL); Duke's Mayo Bowl (NCAA); ACC Championship Game (NCAA); Charlotte FC (MLS) |
| Caesars Superdome | 73,208 | New Orleans | Louisiana | 1975 | Football | New Orleans Saints (NFL); Sugar Bowl (NCAA); New Orleans Bowl (NCAA); Bayou Classic (NCAA) |
| NRG Stadium | 72,220 | Houston | Texas | 2002 | Football | Houston Texans (NFL); Texas Bowl (NCAA) |
| Legion Field | 71,594 | Birmingham | Alabama | 1926 | Football | |
| Mercedes-Benz Stadium | 71,000 | Atlanta | Georgia | 2017 | Football, soccer | Atlanta Falcons (NFL); Atlanta United FC (MLS); Peach Bowl (NCAA); SEC Championship Game (NCAA) |
| M&T Bank Stadium | 70,745 | Baltimore | Maryland | 1998 | Football | Baltimore Ravens (NFL) |
| SoFi Stadium | 70,240 | Inglewood | California | 2020 | Football | Los Angeles Rams (NFL); Los Angeles Chargers (NFL); LA Bowl (NCAA) |
| Raymond James Stadium | 69,218 | Tampa | Florida | 1998 | Football | Tampa Bay Buccaneers (NFL); South Florida Bulls (NCAA); Tampa Bay Bowl (NCAA); Gasparilla Bowl (NCAA) |
| Nissan Stadium | 69,143 | Nashville | Tennessee | 1999 | Football | Tennessee Titans (NFL); Tennessee State Tigers (NCAA); Music City Bowl (NCAA) |
| Lumen Field | 68,740 | Seattle | Washington | 2002 | Football, soccer | Seattle Seahawks (NFL); Seattle Sounders FC (MLS); Seattle Reign FC (NWSL) |
| Levi's Stadium | 68,500 | Santa Clara | California | 2014 | Football | San Francisco 49ers (NFL) |
| Acrisure Stadium | 68,400 | Pittsburgh | Pennsylvania | 2001 | Football | Pittsburgh Steelers (NFL); Pittsburgh Panthers (NCAA) |
| EverBank Stadium | 67,814 | Jacksonville | Florida | 1995 | Football | Jacksonville Jaguars (NFL); Gator Bowl (NCAA); Florida vs. Georgia Football Classic (NCAA) |
| Lincoln Financial Field | 67,594 | Philadelphia | Pennsylvania | 2003 | Football | Philadelphia Eagles (NFL); Temple Owls (NCAA); Army–Navy Game (NCAA) (most years) |
| Cleveland Browns Stadium | 67,431 | Cleveland | Ohio | 1999 | Football | Cleveland Browns (NFL) |
| The Dome at America's Center | 67,277 | St. Louis | Missouri | 1995 | Football | St. Louis Battlehawks (UFL) |
| US Bank Stadium | 66,655 | Minneapolis | Minnesota | 2016 | Football | Minnesota Vikings (NFL) |
| Gillette Stadium | 65,878 | Foxborough | Massachusetts | 2002 | Football, soccer | New England Patriots (NFL); New England Revolution (MLS) |
| Paycor Stadium | 65,515 | Cincinnati | Ohio | 2000 | Football | Cincinnati Bengals (NFL) |
| Ford Field | 65,000 | Detroit | Michigan | 2002 | Football | Detroit Lions (NFL); GameAbove Sports Bowl (NCAA); MAC Championship Game (NCAA); Michigan Panthers (UFL) |
| Allegiant Stadium | 65,000 | Las Vegas | Nevada | 2020 | Football | Las Vegas Raiders (NFL); UNLV Rebels (NCAA); Pac-12 Championship Game (NCAA); Las Vegas Bowl (NCAA) |
| Alamodome | 64,000 | San Antonio | Texas | 1993 | Football | UTSA Roadrunners (NCAA); Alamo Bowl (NCAA); San Antonio Brahmas (UFL); U.S. Army All-American Bowl (High School) |
| Hard Rock Stadium | 64,767 | Miami Gardens | Florida | 1987 | Football | Miami Dolphins (NFL); Miami Hurricanes (NCAA); Orange Bowl (NCAA) |
| State Farm Stadium | 63,400 | Glendale | Arizona | 2006 | Football | Arizona Cardinals (NFL); Fiesta Bowl (NCAA) |
| Lucas Oil Stadium | 63,000 | Indianapolis | Indiana | 2008 | Football | Indianapolis Colts (NFL); Big Ten Championship Game (NCAA) |
| Soldier Field | 61,500 | Chicago | Illinois | 1924;2003 | Football, soccer | Chicago Bears (NFL); Chicago Fire (MLS) |
| Jack Trice Stadium | 61,500 | Ames | Iowa | 1975 | Football | Iowa State Cyclones (NCAA) |
| Yale Bowl | 61,446 | New Haven | Connecticut | 1914 | Football | Yale Bulldogs (NCAA) |
| Camping World Stadium | 60,219 | Orlando | Florida | 1936 | Football | Florida Classic (NCAA); Citrus Bowl (NCAA); Pop-Tarts Bowl (NCAA) |
| Cardinal Stadium | 60,800 | Louisville | Kentucky | 1998 | Football | Louisville Cardinals (NCAA) |
| Commanders Field | 58,000 | Landover | Maryland | 1997 | Football | Washington Commanders (NFL) |
| Carter–Finley Stadium | 56,919 | Raleigh | North Carolina | 1966 | Football | NC State Wolfpack (NCAA) |
| Dodger Stadium | 56,000 | Los Angeles | California | 1962 | Baseball | Los Angeles Dodgers (MLB) |
| Bobby Dodd Stadium at Historic Grant Field | 55,000 | Atlanta | Georgia | 1913 | Football | Georgia Tech Yellow Jackets (NCAA) |
| War Memorial Stadium | 54,120 | Little Rock | Arkansas | 1948 | Football | Arkansas Razorbacks (NCAA) (secondary to Razorback Stadium) |
| Rice-Eccles Stadium | 51,444 | Salt Lake City | Utah | 1998 | Football | Utah Utes (NCAA) |
| Huntington Bank Stadium | 50,805 | Minneapolis | Minnesota | 2009 | Football | Minnesota Golden Gophers (NCAA) |
| Stanford Stadium | 50,424 | Stanford | California | 1921;2006 | Football | Stanford Cardinal (NCAA) |
| Chase Field | 48,405 | Phoenix | Arizona | 1998 | Baseball | Arizona Diamondbacks (MLB); Rate Bowl (NCAA) |
| T-Mobile Park | 47,929 | Seattle | Washington | 1999 | Baseball | Seattle Mariners (MLB) |
| Protective Stadium | 47,100 | Birmingham | Alabama | 2021 | Football | UAB Blazers (NCAA); Birmingham Legion FC (USL Championship); Birmingham Bowl (NCAA); Birmingham Stallions (UFL) |
| Amon G. Carter Stadium | 47,000 | Fort Worth | Texas | 1930 | Football | TCU Horned Frogs (NCAA); Armed Forces Bowl (NCAA) |
| Oakland Coliseum | 46,847 | Oakland | California | 1966 | Multi-purpose | Oakland Athletics (MLB) |
| Yankee Stadium | 46,537 | New York | New York | 2009 | Baseball, soccer | New York Yankees (MLB); New York City FC (MLS); Pinstripe Bowl (NCAA) |
| Angel Stadium | 45,517 | Anaheim | California | 1966 | Baseball | Los Angeles Angels (MLB) |
| Busch Stadium | 44,383 | St. Louis | Missouri | 2006 | Baseball | St. Louis Cardinals (MLB) |
| Citizens Bank Park | 42,901 | Philadelphia | Pennsylvania | 2004 | Baseball | Philadelphia Phillies (MLB) |
| Citi Field | 41,922 | New York | New York | 2009 | Baseball | New York Mets (MLB) |
| Oracle Park | 41,915 | San Francisco | California | 2000 | Baseball | San Francisco Giants (MLB) |
| American Family Field | 41,900 | Milwaukee | Wisconsin | 2001 | Baseball | Milwaukee Brewers (MLB) |
| Wrigley Field | 41,649 | Chicago | Illinois | 1914 | Baseball | Chicago Cubs (MLB) |
| Minute Maid Park | 41,168 | Houston | Texas | 2000 | Baseball | Houston Astros (MLB) |
| Comerica Park | 41,083 | Detroit | Michigan | 2000 | Baseball | Detroit Tigers (MLB) |
| FirstBank Stadium | 40,350 | Nashville | Tennessee | 1922 | Football | Vanderbilt Commodores (NCAA) |
| Petco Park | 40,209 | San Diego | California | 2004 | Baseball | San Diego Padres (MLB); Holiday Bowl (NCAA) |
| Target Field | 38,544 | Minneapolis | Minnesota | 2010 | Baseball | Minnesota Twins (MLB) |
| Nippert Stadium | 38,088 | Cincinnati | Ohio | 1915 | Football | Cincinnati Bearcats (NCAA) |
| Pratt & Whitney Stadium | 38,066 | East Hartford | Connecticut | 2003 | Football | UConn Huskies (NCAA) |
| Fenway Park | 37,755 | Boston | Massachusetts | 1912 | Baseball | Boston Red Sox (MLB); Fenway Bowl (NCAA) |
| Sam Boyd Stadium | 36,800 | Las Vegas | Nevada | 1971 | Football | USA Sevens and Monster Jam World Finals |
| LoanDepot Park | 36,742 | Miami | Florida | 2012 | Baseball | Miami Marlins (MLB) |
| Snapdragon Stadium | 35,000 | San Diego | California | 2022 | Football | San Diego State Aztecs (NCAA); San Diego FC (MLS); San Diego Wave FC (NWSL) |
| Navy–Marine Corps Memorial Stadium | 34,000 | Annapolis | Maryland | 1959 | Football | Navy Midshipmen (NCAA); Military Bowl (NCAA) |
| Harvard Stadium | 30,323 | Allston | Massachusetts | 1903 | Football | Harvard Crimson (NCAA) |
| FAU Stadium | 29,571 | Boca Raton | Florida | 2011 | Football | Florida Atlantic Owls (NCAA); Boca Raton Bowl (NCAA) |
| Princeton Stadium | 27,773 | Princeton | New Jersey | 1998 | Football | Princeton Tigers (NCAA) |
| Dignity Health Sports Park Soccer Stadium | 27,000 | Carson | California | 2003 | Soccer | Los Angeles Galaxy (MLS), RFCLA (Major League Rugby) |
| Tad Gormley Stadium | 26,500 | New Orleans | Louisiana | 1936 | Multipurpose | |
| TQL Stadium | 25,513 | Cincinnati | Ohio | 2021 | Soccer | FC Cincinnati (MLS) |
| Inter&Co Stadium | 25,500 | Orlando | Florida | 2017 | Soccer | Orlando City SC (MLS); Orlando Pride (NWSL) |
| Providence Park | 25,218 | Portland | Oregon | 1926 | Soccer | Portland Timbers (MLS); Portland Thorns (NWSL); Portland State Vikings (NCAA) |
| UB Stadium | 25,013 | Amherst | New York | 1993 | Football | Buffalo Bulls (NCAA) |
| Red Bull Arena | 25,000 | Harrison | New Jersey | 2010 | Soccer | New York Red Bulls (MLS); Gotham FC (NWSL) |
| City Stadium | 22,611 | Richmond | Virginia | 1929 | Soccer | Richmond Kickers (USL League One) |
| CityPark | 22,423 | St. Louis | Missouri | 2022 | Soccer | St. Louis City SC (MLS) |
| Shell Energy Stadium | 22,039 | Houston | Texas | 2012 | Soccer | Houston Dynamo (MLS); Texas Southern Tigers (NCAA); Houston Dash (NWSL) |
| BMO Stadium | 22,000 | Los Angeles | California | 2018 | Soccer | Los Angeles FC (MLS); Angel City FC (NWSL) |
| CEFCU Stadium | 21,520 | San Jose | California | 1933 | Football | San Jose State Spartans (NCAA) |
| DRV PNK Stadium | 21,000 | Fort Lauderdale | Florida | 2020 | Soccer | Inter Miami CF (MLS) |
| Q2 Stadium | 20,738 | Austin | Texas | 2021 | Soccer | Austin FC (MLS) |
| Toyota Stadium | 20,500 | Frisco | Texas | 2005 | Soccer | FC Dallas (MLS); Frisco Bowl (NCAA); NCAA Division I Football Championship Game (FCS) (NCAA) |
| Finley Stadium | 20,412 | Chattanooga | Tennessee | 1997 | Football | Chattanooga Mocs (NCAA) |
| Lower.com Field | 20,371 | Columbus | Ohio | 2021 | Soccer | Columbus Crew (MLS) |
| America First Field | 20,213 | Sandy | Utah | 2008 | Soccer | Real Salt Lake (MLS); Utah Royals FC (NWSL) |
| Riccardo Silva Stadium | 20,000 | Miami | Florida | 1995 | Football | FIU Golden Panthers (NCAA); Miami FC (USL Championship) |
| SeatGeek Stadium | 20,000 | Bridgeview | Illinois | 2006 | Soccer | Chicago Red Stars (NWSL); Chicago House AC (NISA); Chicago Hounds (MLR) |
| Audi Field | 20,000 | Washington, D.C. | District of Columbia | 2018 | Multipurpose | D.C. United (MLS); Washington Spirit (NWSL); DC Defenders (UFL) |
| Historic Crew Stadium | 19,968 | Columbus | Ohio | 1999 | Soccer | |
| Allianz Field | 19,400 | St. Paul | Minnesota | 2019 | Soccer | Minnesota United FC (MLS) |
| Subaru Park | 18,500 | Chester | Pennsylvania | 2010 | Soccer | Philadelphia Union (MLS) |
| Children's Mercy Park | 18,467 | Kansas City | Kansas | 2011 | Soccer | Sporting Kansas City (MLS); Kansas City Current (NWSL) |
| Dick's Sporting Goods Park | 18,061 | Commerce City | Colorado | 2007 | Soccer | Colorado Rapids (MLS) |
| PayPal Park | 18,000 | San Jose | California | 2015 | Soccer | San Jose Earthquakes (MLS); Bay FC (NWSL) |
| Harder Stadium | 17,000 | Santa Barbara | California | 1966 | Soccer | UC Santa Barbara Gauchos (NCAA) |
| Hersheypark Stadium | 15,641 | Hershey | Pennsylvania | 1939 | Football, soccer | |
| Drake Stadium | 14,557 | Cedar Falls | Iowa | 1925 | Football, soccer | Drake Bulldogs (NCAA) |
| Rochester Community Sports Complex Stadium | 13,768 | Rochester | New York | 2006 | Soccer | Flower City Union (NISA) |
| Louisville Slugger Field | 13,131 | Louisville | Kentucky | 2000 | Baseball | Louisville Bats (IL) |
| IU Michael A. Carroll Track & Soccer Stadium | 12,111 | Indianapolis | Indiana | 1982 | Soccer | Indy Eleven (USL Championship); IUPUI Jaguars (NCAA) |
| James M. Shuart Stadium | 11,929 | Hempstead | New York | 1963 | Multi-purpose | |
| Lynn Family Stadium | 11,700 | Louisville | Kentucky | 2020 | Soccer | Louisville City FC (USL Championship); Racing Louisville FC (NWSL) |
| Heart Health Park | 11,569 | Sacramento | California | 2014 | Soccer | Sacramento Republic FC (USL Championship) |
| Alex G. Spanos Stadium | 11,075 | San Luis Obispo | California | 1935 | Football, soccer | Cal Poly Mustangs (NCAA) |
| Atwood Stadium | 11,000 | Flint | Michigan | 1929 | Football, soccer | Flint City Bucks (USL League Two) |
| Welcome Stadium | 11,000 | Dayton | Ohio | 1949 | Football | Dayton Flyers (NCAA) |
| 121 Financial Ballpark | 11,000 | Jacksonville | Florida | 2003 | Baseball | Jacksonville Jumbo Shrimp (IL) |
| Chukchansi Park | 10,650 | Fresno | California | 2002 | Baseball | Fresno Grizzlies (CL) |
| American Legion Memorial Stadium | 10,500 | Charlotte | North Carolina | 1936 | Football, soccer | Anthem Rugby Carolina (Major League Rugby), Charlotte Independence (USL League One) |
| Howard Wood Field | 10,000 | Sioux Falls | South Dakota | 1957 | Football, soccer | |
| Autozone Park | 10,000 | Memphis | Tennessee | 2000 | Baseball, Soccer | Memphis Redbirds (IL); Memphis 901 FC (USL Championship) |
| WakeMed Soccer Park | 10,000 | Cary | North Carolina | 2002 | Soccer | North Carolina Courage (NWSL); North Carolina FC (USL League One); Carolina Flyers (AUDL) |
| Wild Horse Pass Stadium | 10,000 | Chandler | Arizona | 2021 | Soccer | Phoenix Rising FC (USL Championship) |
| Jerry Comalander Stadium | 10,000 | San Antonio | Texas | | Football, soccer | |
| Kingston Stadium | 10,000 | Cedar Rapids | Iowa | 1952 | Football, soccer | |

== Uruguay ==
| Stadium | Capacity | City | Tenants |
|---|---|---|---|
| Estadio Centenario | 60,235 | Montevideo | Uruguay |
| Estadio Campeón del Siglo | 40,005 | Montevideo | Club Atlético Peñarol |
| Estadio Gran Parque Central | 34,446 | Montevideo | Club Nacional de Football |
| Estadio Atilio Paiva Olivera | 27,135 | Rivera | Selección de fútbol de Rivera |
| Estadio Luis Tróccoli | 25,000 | Montevideo | CA Cerro |
| Estadio Parque Artigas | 25,000 | Paysandú | Selección de fútbol de Paysandú and Paysandú F.C. |
| Estadio Domingo Burgueño | 22,000 | Maldonado | Deportivo Maldonado |
| Estadio Luis Franzini | 18,000 | Montevideo | Defensor Sporting |
| Estadio José Nasazzi | 15,000 | Montevideo | Club Atlético Bella Vista |
| Estadio Charrúa | 14,000 | Montevideo | Los Teros |
| Estadio Goyenola | 12,000 | Tacuarembó | Tacuarembó FC |
| Estadio Parque Artigas Las Piedras | 12,000 | Las Piedras | Juventud LP |
| Jardines del Hipódromo | 11,018 | Montevideo | Danubio |
| Estadio Belvedere | 10,000 | Montevideo | Liverpool FC |
| Estadio Parque Capurro | 10,000 | Montevideo | Fénix |

== Uzbekistan ==
| Stadium | Capacity | City | Tenants |
|---|---|---|---|
| Pakhtakor Central Stadium | 35,000 | Shaykhontohur, Tashkent | Uzbekistan national football team, Pakhtakor FC |
| Milliy Stadium | 34,000 | Chilanzar, Tashkent | Uzbekistan national football team, FC Bunyodkor |
| Xorazm Stadium | 25,000 | Urgench | Xorazm FK Urganch |
| Buxoro Arena | 22,700 | Bukhara | FK Buxoro |
| Markaziy Stadium | 22,000 | Kosonsoy | FK Kosonsoy |
| Markaziy Stadium | 22,000 | Namangan | PFC Navbahor Namangan |
| Soghlom Avlod Stadium | 18,360 | Andijan | FK Andijon |
| Dinamo Samarkand Stadium | 16,000 | Samarkand | FC Dinamo Samarqand |
| Markaziy Stadium | 16,000 | Qarshi | Nasaf Qarshi |
| Metallurg Bekabad Stadium | 15,000 | Bekabad | PFK Metallurg Bekabad |
| Fargona Stadium | 14,600 | Fergana | FC Neftchi Fergana |
| Olympic City Stadium | 12,000 | Tashkent | |
| Sogdiana Stadium | 11,650 | Jizzakh | FC Sogdiana Jizzakh |
| Bahrom Vafoev Stadium | 11,000 | Muborak | FK Mash'al Mubarek |
| Metallurg Stadium | 11,000 | Olmaliq | FC AGMK |
| Shurtan Stadium | 10,000 | Guzar District, Qashqadaryo | FC Shurtan Guzar |

== Venezuela ==
| Stadium | Capacity | Location | Tenants |
|---|---|---|---|
| Estadio Monumental de Maturín | 52,000 | Maturín | Monagas Sport Club |
| Estadio Metropolitano de Fútbol de Lara | 47,913 | Barquisimeto | Unión Lara |
| Estadio Metropolitano de Mérida | 42,200 | Mérida | Estudiantes de Mérida FC |
| Polideportivo Cachamay | 41,600 | Ciudad Guayana | Atlético Club Mineros de Guayana |
| Estadio José Pachencho Romero | 40,800 | Maracaibo | Unión Atlético Maracaibo |
| Estadio Polideportivo de Pueblo Nuevo | 38,755 | San Cristóbal | Deportivo Táchira Fútbol Club |
| Estadio José Antonio Anzoátegui | 37,485 | Puerto la Cruz | Deportivo Anzoátegui |
| Estadio Agustín Tovar | 29,800 | Barinas | Zamora Fútbol Club |
| Estadio José Alberto Pérez | 25,000 | Valera | Trújillanos Fútbol Club |
| Estadio Olímpico | 24,900 | Caracas | Caracas Fútbol Club, Deportivo La Guaira, Metropolitanos and Universidad Central |
| Estadio General José Antonio Paez | 18,000 | Acarigua | Portuguesa Fútbol Club |
| Polideportivo Félix Velázquez | 15,000 | Cumaná | Sucre Fútbol Club |
| Estadio Olímpico Hermanos Ghersi Páez | 14,000 | Maracay | Aragua Fútbol Club |
| Estadio Guillermo Soto Rosa | 14,000 | Mérida | Universidad de Los Andes Fútbol Club |
| Estadio Rafael Calles Pinto | 13.000 | Guanare | Llaneros de Guanare |
| Estadio 12 de Febrero | 12,785 | El Vigía | Atlético El Vigía Fútbol Club |
| Estadio Farid Richa | 12,480 | Barquisimeto | Unión Lara |
| Estadio Misael Delgado | 10,400 | Valencia | Carabobo Fútbol Club, Gran Valencia Fútbol Club, Hermandad Gallega Fútbol Club |
| Estadio Brígido Iriarte | 10,000 | Caracas | Atlético Venezuela, Estudiantes de Caracas and Metropolitanos |
| Estadio Florentino Oropeza | 10,000 | San Felipe | Yaracuyanos Fútbol Club |
| Estadio Pedro Chávez | 10,000 | San Antonio | Club Deportivo San Antonio, Real Frontera Sport Club |
| Estadio Héroes de San Mateo | 10,000 | San Mateo | None |
| Estadio Alexander Bottini | 10,000 | Maturín | Monagas Sport Club “B” |
| Estadio Antonio José de Sucre | 10,000 | Puerto Ayacucho | Tucanes de Amazonas Fútbol Club |

== Vietnam ==
| Stadium | Capacity | City | Tenants |
|---|---|---|---|
| Mỹ Đình National Stadium | 40,192 | Hanoi | Vietnam |
| Cần Thơ Stadium | 30,000 | Cần Thơ | Can Tho FC |
| Ha Tinh | 30,000 | Ha Tinh | Hong Linh Ha Tinh |
| Hang Day | 22,500 | Hanoi | Hanoi FC, Viettel |
| Ninh Binh | 22,000 | Ninh Bình | Công An Nhân Dân |
| Hoa Xuan | 20,000 | Danang | SHB Danang |
| Long An | 20,000 | Tân An | Long An |
| Vinh | 18,000 | Nghe An | Song Lam Nghe An |
| 18/9 | 18,000 | Nha Trang | Khánh Hòa |
| Thong Nhat | 16,000 | Ho Chi Minh City | Ho Chi Minh City FC, Saigon FC |
| Tự Do | 16,000 | Huế | Huế |
| Quy Nhon | 15,000 | Binh Dinh | Topenland Binh Dinh |
| Tam Kỳ | 15,000 | Tam Kỳ | Quảng Nam |
| Go Dau | 13,035 | Binh Duong | Becamex Binh Duong |
| Pleiku | 12,000 | Gia Lai | Hoang Anh Gia Lai |
| Thanh Hoa | 12,000 | Thanh Hoa | Dong A Thanh Hoa |

== Yemen ==
| Stadium | City | Capacity | Tenants |
|---|---|---|---|
| Seiyun Olympic Stadium | Seiyun | 50,000 | |
| Al-Wihda Stadium | Zinjibar | 30,000 | Hassan Abyan |
| Baradem Mukalla Stadium | Mukalla | 15,000 | Al-Sha'ab Hadhramaut |
| Al Ulufi Stadium | Al Hudaydah | 10,000 | Al-Hilal Al-Sahili |

== Zambia ==
| Stadium | Capacity | City | Tenants |
|---|---|---|---|
| National Heroes Stadium | 60,000 | Lusaka | National team |
| Levy Mwanawasa Stadium | 49,800 | Ndola | ZESCO United |
| Independence Stadium | 30,000 | Lusaka | Green Buffaloes F.C. |
| Nchanga Stadium | 20,000 | Chingola | Nchanga Rangers |
| Dag Hammarskjöld Stadium | 18,000 | Ndola | Ndola United FC |
| Woodlands Stadium | 15,000 | Lusaka | City of Lusaka F.C. |
| Nkoloma Stadium | 15,000 | Lusaka | Red Arrows F.C. |
| Garden Park | 10,000 | Kitwe | Kitwe United Football Club |
| Nkana Stadium | 10,000 | Kitwe | Nkana F.C. |
| Woodlands Stadium | 10,000 | Lusaka | City of Lusaka F.C. |

== Zimbabwe ==
| Stadium | Capacity | City | Tenants |
|---|---|---|---|
| National Sports Stadium | 60,000 | Harare | Zimbabwe national football team CAPS United F.C. |
| Rufaro Stadium | 60,000 | Harare | Dynamos Harare; Harare City F.C. |
| Barbourfields Stadium | 40,000 | Bulawayo | Highlanders FC |
| Sakubva Stadium | 20,000 | Mutare | Manica Diamonds |
| Mandava Stadium | 15,000 | Zvishavane | F.C. Platinum |

== See also ==
- Lists of stadiums
- List of indoor arenas
- List of indoor arenas by capacity
- List of stadiums by capacity
- List of American football stadiums by capacity
