= List of stadiums in China =

The following is a list of stadiums in China, indoor and outdoor, ordered by capacity. Currently stadiums with a capacity of 10,000 or more are included.

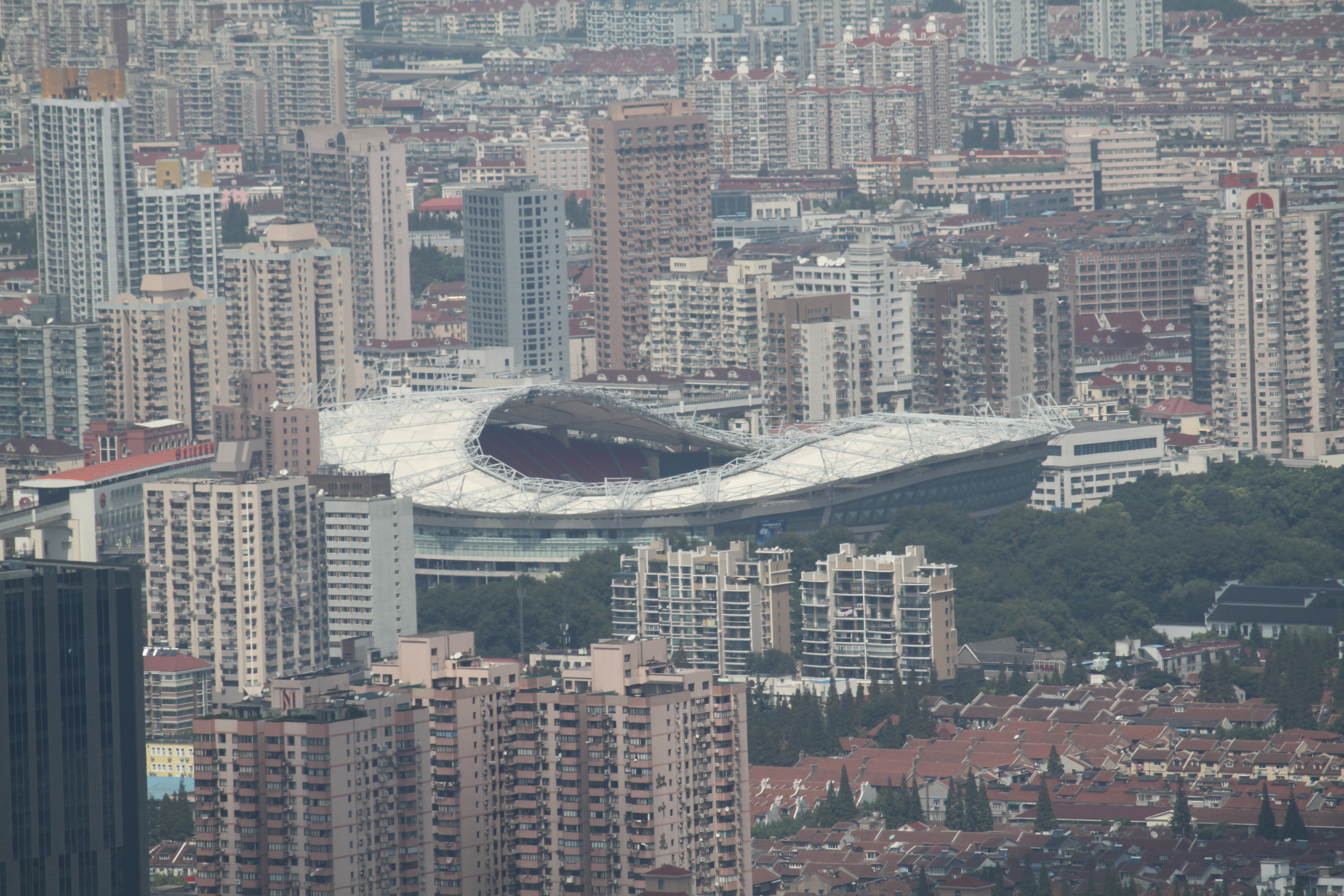
The Hongkou Stadium is the former home of Shanghai Shenhua.

== Current stadiums ==
#	Images	Stadium	Capacity	City	Province	Home team
1	Beijing national stadium	National Stadium	91,000	Beijing	Beijing	2008 Summer Olympics, 2015 World Championships in Athletics, 2022 Winter Olympics
2		Hangzhou Olympic Sports Centre Stadium	80,800	Hangzhou	Zhejiang	2022 Asian Games
3		Guangdong Olympic Sports Centre Stadium	80,012	Guangzhou	Guangdong	2001 National Games of China, 2009 Asian Athletics Championships, 2010 Asian Games, 2025 National Games of China
4	Shanghai Stadium	Shanghai Stadium	72,000	Shanghai	Shanghai	Shanghai Shenhua, 1997 National Games of China, 2007 Special Olympics World Summer Games, Football at the 2008 Summer Olympics
5		Workers' Stadium	68,000	Beijing	Beijing	Beijing Guoan, 1990 Asian Games, 1993 National Games of China, 2004 AFC Asian Cup, Football at the 2008 Summer Olympics
6		Dalian Suoyuwan Football Stadium	63,139	Dalian	Liaoning	Dalian Yingbo
7		Hefei Sports Centre Stadium	61,177	Hefei	Anhui	
8	Nanjing Olympic Sports Center	Nanjing Olympic Sports Centre Stadium	61,000	Nanjing	Jiangsu	2005 National Games of China, 2014 Summer Youth Olympic Games
9	Dalian Sports Center Stadium	Dalian Sports Centre Stadium	61,000	Dalian	Liaoning	
10	Shenzhen Universiade Stadium	Shenzhen Universiade Sports Center Stadium	60,404	Shenzhen	Guangdong	2011 Summer Universiade
11		Xi'an Olympic Sports Centre Stadium	60,033	Xi'an	Shaanxi	2021 National Games of China
12		Shanxi Sports Centre Stadium	60,016	Taiyuan	Shanxi	
13	Longxing Football Stadium	Longxing Football Stadium	60,000	Chongqing	Chongqing	
14 |	Guangxi Sports Centre Stadium	Guangxi Sports Centre Stadium	60,000	Nanning	Guangxi	Guangxi Hengchen
15		Ordos Sports Centre Stadium	60,000	Ordos	Inner Mongolia	
16		Shenyang Olympic Sports Centre Stadium	60,000	Shenyang	Liaoning	Football at the 2008 Summer Olympics, 2013 National Games of China
17		Lanzhou Olympic Sports Centre Stadium	60,000	Lanzhou	Gansu	Lanzhou Longyuan Athletic F.C.
18		Zhengzhou Olympic Sports Centre Stadium	60,000	Zhengzhou	Henan	
19		Luoyang Olympic Sports Centre Stadium	59,759	Luoyang	Henan	
20	Haixia Olympic Sports Centre	Haixia Olympic Sports Centre Stadium	59,562	Fuzhou	Fujian	
21 |	Xi'an International Football Centre Stadium	Xi'an International Football Centre Stadium	59,551	Xi'an	Shaanxi	
22	Chongqing Olympic Sports Center	Chongqing Olympic Sports Centre Stadium	58,680	Chongqing	Chongqing	2004 AFC Asian Cup
23	Tianhe Sports Centre Stadium	Tianhe Stadium	58,500	Guangzhou	Guangdong	1987 National Games of China, 1991 FIFA Women's World Cup, Football at the 2010 Asian Games, 2011 Summer Universiade
24		Nanchang International Sports Centre Stadium	58,235	Nanchang	Jiangxi	
25	Jinan Olympic Sports Center	Jinan Olympic Sports Centre Stadium	56,808	Jinan	Shandong	Shandong Taishan, 2009 National Games of China
26		Helong Stadium	55,000	Changsha	Hunan	
27		Tianjin Olympic Sports Centre Stadium	54,696	Tianjin	Tianjin	Tianjin Jinmen Tiger, 2007 FIFA Women's World Cup, Football at the 2008 Summer Olympics, 2017 National Games of China
28	Wuhan Sports Centre Stadium	Wuhan Sports Centre Stadium	54,357	Wuhan	Hubei	Wuhan Three Towns, 2007 FIFA Women's World Cup, 2015 Asian Athletics Championships
29		Xiamen Egret Stadium	53,443	Xiamen	Fujian	
30		Phoenix Hill Sports Park Football Stadium	52,800	Chengdu	Sichuan	Chengdu Rongcheng
31	Yellow Dragon Sports Centre Stadium	Huanglong Sports Centre Stadium	52,672	Hangzhou	Zhejiang	Hangzhou Greentown, 2007 FIFA Women's World Cup
32	Guiyang Olympic Sports Centre Stadium	Guiyang Olympic Sports Centre Stadium	51,636	Guiyang	Guizhou	Guizhou Zhucheng Athletic F.C.
33	Qingdao Guoxin Stadium	Hohhot City Stadium	51,632	Hohhot	Inner Mongolia	
34		Shaanxi Province Stadium	50,100	Xi'an	Shaanxi	
35		Wenzhou Olympic Sports Centre Stadium	50,000	Wenzhou	Zhejiang	
36	Qingdao Youth Football Stadium	Qingdao Youth Football Stadium	50,000	Qingdao	Shandong	Qingdao Hainiu
37		Jiangxi Olympic Sports Center	50,000	Nanchang	Jiangxi	
38	Kai Tak Sports Park	Kai Tak Stadium	50,000	Kowloon	Hong Kong	Hong Kong national football team 2025 National Games of China
39		Harbin ICE Stadium	48,707	Harbin	Heilongjiang	1996 Asian Winter Games, 2009 Winter Universiade
40		Henan Provincial Sports Centre Stadium	48,000	Zhengzhou	Henan	Henan Jianye W.F.C.
41		Sanya Sports Centre Egret Stadium	45,000	Sanya	Hainan	
42	Hohhot City Stadium	Qingdao Guoxin Stadium	45,000	Qingdao	Shandong	
43		Zibo Sports Centre Stadium	45,000	Zibo	Shandong	2010 AFC U-19 Championship
44		Kunshan Football Stadium	45,000	Kunshan City, Suzhou	Jiangsu	
45		Weifang Sports Centre Stadium	45,000	Weifang	Shandong	
46	Shenzhen Sports Center Stadium	Shenzhen Sports Centre Stadium	45,000	Shenzhen	Guangdong	Shenzhen Peng City
47	Bao'an Stadium	Bao'an Stadium	44,050	Shenzhen	Guangdong	Shenzhen Juniors, 2011 Summer Universiade
48		Shandong Stadium	43,700	Jinan	Shandong	2004 AFC Asian Cup
49		Jinzhou Binhai Sports Centre Stadium	43,000	Jinzhou	Liaoning	
50		Xinjiang Sports Centre	42,300	Ürümqi	Xinjiang	
51		Chengdu Longquanyi Football Stadium	42,000	Chengdu	Sichuan	2004 AFC Asian Cup
52	Wuyuan River Stadium	Wuyuan River Stadium	41,506	Haikou	Hainan	
53		Changzhou Olympic Sports Centre Stadium	41,000	Changzhou	Jiangsu	
54		Suzhou Olympic Sports Centre Stadium	40,933	Suzhou	Jiangsu	
55		Huainan Olympic Sports Centre Stadium	40,868	Huainan	Anhui	
56		Baotou Olympic Sports Centre Stadium	40,545	Baotou	Inner Mongolia	Inner Mongolia Caoshangfei
57		Anqing Sports Centre Stadium	40,000	Anqing	Anhui	
58		Wuhu Olympic Sports Centre Stadium	40,000	Wuhu	Anhui	
59		Anyang Cultural and Sports Centre Stadium	40,000	Anyang	Henan	
60		Yantai Sports Park Stadium	40,000	Yantai	Shandong	
61		Yichang Olympic Sports Centre Stadium	40,000	Yichang	Hubei	
62	Hong Kong Stadium	Hong Kong Stadium	40,000	So Kon Po	Hong Kong	Hong Kong national football team, 1956 AFC Asian Cup, 1975 AFC Women's Championship, 1981 AFC Women's Championship, 1997 Rugby World Cup Sevens, 2005 Rugby World Cup Sevens
63		Tuodong Stadium	40,000	Kunming	Yunnan	
64		Xianyang Olympic Sports Centre Stadium	40,000	Xianyang	Shaanxi	
65		Anshan Sports Centre Stadium	40,000	Anshan	Liaoning	
66		Xining Stadium	40,000	Xining	Qinghai	
67		Shaoxing China Textile City Sports Centre Stadium	40,000	Shaoxing	Zhejiang	
68		Chuzhou Olympic Sports Centre Stadium	40,000	Chuzhou	Anhui	
69		Tiexi New District Sports Centre Stadium	40,000	Shenyang	Liaoning	Liaoning Tieren
70		Helan Mountain Stadium	39,872	Yinchuan	Ningxia	
71		Huludao City Sports Centre Stadium	38,798	Huludao	Liaoning	Dandong Tengyue
72	Guangzhou Higher Education Mega Center Central Stadium	Guangzhou Higher Education Mega Center Central Stadium	39,346	Guangzhou	Guangdong	Football at the 2010 Asian Games
73		Chengdu Sports Centre Stadium	39,225	Chengdu	Sichuan	2007 FIFA Women's World Cup, 2010 AFC Women's Asian Cup
74	Changchun City Stadium	Changchun City Stadium	38,500	Changchun	Jilin	Changchun Yatai
75		Pudong Football Stadium	37,000	Shanghai	Shanghai	Shanghai Port
76		Ma'anshan Olympic Sports Centre Stadium	36,542	Ma'anshan	Anhui	
77	TEDA Football Stadium	TEDA Football Stadium	36,390	Tianjin	Tianjin	Tianjin Jinmen Tiger
78
79		Yancheng Olympic Sports Centre Stadium	36,000	Yancheng	Jiangsu	
80		Kuishan Sports Centre Stadium	36,000	Rizhao	Shandong	
81		Jiaozuo Sports Centre Stadium	35,881	Jiaozuo	Henan	
82		Panjin Jinxiu Stadium	35,600	Panjin	Liaoning	
83		Zunyi Olympic Sports Centre Stadium	35,597	Zunyi	Guizhou	
84		Ordos Stadium	35,107	Ordos	Inner Mongolia	2012 Miss World
85		Nanyang Sports Centre Stadium	35,000	Nanyang	Henan	
86		Wuwei Olympic Sports Centre Stadium	35,000	Wuwei	Gansu	
87		Suzhou Sports Centre Stadium	35,000	Suzhou	Jiangsu	Suzhou Dongwu
88		Liuzhou Sports Centre	35,000	Beijing	Beijing	
89		Xuzhou Olympic Sports Centre Stadium	35,000	Xuzhou	Jiangsu	
90		Yingkou Olympic Sports Centre Stadium	35,000	Yingkou	Liaoning	
91		Zhuhai Sports Centre Stadium	35,000	Zhuhai	Guangdong	
92		Qujing Cultural and Sports Park	34,162	Qujing	Yunnan	
93		Quanzhou Sports Centre Stadium	34,000	Quanzhou	Fujian	
94		Qinhuangdao Olympic Sports Centre Stadium	33,572	Qinhuangdao	Hebei	Football at the 2008 Summer Olympics
95	Hongkou Football Stadium	Hongkou Football Stadium	33,060	Shanghai	Shanghai	2007 FIFA Women's World Cup
96		Huangshi Olympic Sports Centre Stadium	32,059	Huangshi	Hubei	
97		Xiamen Sports Centre Stadium	32,000	Xiamen	Fujian	
98		Weinan Sports Centre Stadium	32,000	Weinan	Shaanxi	Shaanxi Union F.C.
99		Mashipu Stadium	32,000	Nanchong	Sichuan	
100		Datianwan Stadium	32,000	Chongqing	Chongqing	
101		Fushun Leifeng Stadium	32,000	Fushun	Liaoning	
102		Hailanjiang Stadium	32,000	Longjing	Jilin	
103		Chifeng Stadium	32,000	Chifeng	Inner Mongolia	
104		Shanxi Provincial Stadium	32,000	Taiyuan	Shanxi	
105		Dingbian County Sports Centre Stadium	32,000	Yulin	Shaanxi	
106		Tai'an Sports Centre Stadium	32,000	Tai'an	Shandong	Tai'an Tiankuang F.C.
107		Changchun Olympic Park Stadium	31,684	Changchun	Jilin	
108		Xiong'an Sports Centre Stadium	31,460	Xiong'an	Hebei	
109		Xinxiang Stadium	31,200	Xinxiang	Henan	
110		Beijing Fengtai Stadium	31,043	Beijing	Beijing	
111		Zhenjiang Sports and Exhibition Center	31,000	Zhenjiang	Jiangsu	
112		Jiujiang Stadium	31,000	Jiujiang	Jiangxi	
113		Bazhong Stadium	30,812	Bazhong	Sichuan	
114	Jinzhou Stadium	Jinzhou Stadium	30,775	Dalian	Liaoning	Dalian K'un City F.C.
115		Langfang Stadium	30,040	Langfang	Hebei	
116		Xiangyang Olympic Sports Centre Stadium	30,000	Xiangyang	Hubei	
117		Huai'an Olympic Sports Centre Stadium	30,000	Huai'an	Jiangsu	
118		Lianyungang Sports Centre Stadium	30,000	Lianyungang	Jiangsu	
119		Lu'an Sports Centre Stadium	30,000	Lu'an	Anhui	
120		Huaibei Sports Centre Stadium	30,000	Huaibei	Anhui	
121		Chenzhou Olympic Sports Centre Stadium	30,000	Chenzhou	Hunan	
122		Yellow River Sports Centre Stadium	30,000	Wuzhong	Ningxia	
123		Haihe Educational Football Stadium	30,000	Tianjin	Tianjin	
124		Qilihe Stadium	30,000	Lanzhou	Gansu	
125		Quzhou Stadium	30,000	Quzhou	Zhejiang	
126		Handan City Sports Centre Stadium	30,000	Handan	Hebei	
127		Gaoyou Sports Centre Stadium	30,000	Gaoyou City, Yangzhou	Jiangsu	
128		Liaocheng Sports Park Stadium	30,000	Liaocheng	Shandong	
129		Loudi Stadium	30,000	Loudi	Hunan	
130		Jinshan Football Stadium	30,000	Shanghai	Shanghai	
131		Hengshui City Olympic Sports Centre Stadium	30,000	Hengshui	Hebei	
132		Kunshan Stadium	30,000	Kunshan City, Suzhou	Jiangsu	
133		Yiyang Stadium	30,000	Yiyang	Hunan	Hunan Billows
134		Bengbu Sports Centre Stadium	30,000	Bengbu	Anhui	
135		Tongling Sports Centre Stadium	30,000	Tongling	Anhui	
136	Yanji Nationwide Fitness Centre Stadium	Yanji Nationwide Fitness Centre Stadium	30,000	Yanji	Jilin	Yanbian Longding
137		Puwan New District Stadium	30,000	Dalian	Liaoning	
138		Guigang Sports Centre Stadium	30,000	Guigang	Guangxi	
139		Ulanqab Stadium	30,000	Ulanqab	Inner Mongolia	
140		Datong Sports Park Stadium	30,000	Datong	Shanxi	
141		Wuhan Five Rings Sports Centre	30,000	Wuhan	Hubei	
142		Danzhou Sports Centre Stadium	30,000	Danzhou	Hainan	
143		Taizhou Sports Park Stadium	30,000	Taizhou	Zhejiang	
144		Leshan Olympic Centre Stadium	30,000	Leshan	Sichuan	
145		Qingyuan Sports Centre Stadium	30,000	Qingyuan	Guangdong	
146		Zaozhuang Sports and Cultural Centre Stadium	30,000	Zaozhuang	Shandong	
147		Bloomage LIVE Yudong HI-ZONE Stadium	30,000	Chongqing	Chongqing	
148		Zoucheng Sports Centre Stadium	30,000	Zoucheng	Shandong	
149		Qionghai Cultural and Sports Centre Stadium	30,000	Qionghai	Hainan	
150	Zhengzhou Hanghai Stadium	Zhengzhou Hanghai Stadium	29,860	Zhengzhou	Henan	Henan FC
151		Hulunbuir Stadium	29,589	Hulunbuir	Inner Mongolia	
152		Haihe Educational Football Stadium	29,356	Tianjin	Tianjin	
153		Maoming Olympic Sports Centre Stadium	29,325	Maoming	Guangdong	
154		Suqian Olympic Sports Centre Stadium	29,151	Suqian	Jiangsu	
155	Yutong International Sports Center	Yutong International Sports Centre Stadium	29,000	Shijiazhuang	Hebei	Shijiazhuang Gongfu
156		Wuxi Sports Centre Stadium	28,146	Wuxi	Jiangsu	Wuxi Wugo
157		Jiangning Stadium	28,000	Nanjing	Jiangsu	
158		Horqin Sports Centre Stadium	28,000	Tongliao	Inner Mongolia	
159		Changzhi Sports Centre Stadium	27,653	Changzhi	Shanxi	
160		Wendeng Sports Park Stadium	27,500	Weihai	Shandong	
161		Huitang Stadium	27,000	Meizhou	Guangdong	Meizhou Hakka
162		Xiaogan Stadium	27,000	Xiaogan	Hubei	
163		Qianxi County Olympic Sports Centre Stadium	27,000	Bijie	Guizhou	
164		Jinzhou City Stadium	26,800	Jinzhou	Liaoning	
165		Shuangliu Sports Centre	26,000	Chengdu	Sichuan	
166		Wanzhou Pailou Sports Stadium	26,000	Chongqing	Chongqing	
167		Chongqing Olympic Sports Centre Stadium	26,514	Chongqing	Chongqing	
168		Qinzhou Sports Centre Stadium	26,400	Qinzhou	Guangxi	
169		Yingkou Stadium	26,020	Yingkou	Liaoning	
170		Huichuan Sports Centre Stadium	26,000	Zunyi	Guizhou	
171		Nanchang Bayi Stadium	26,000	Nanchang	Jiangxi	
172		Guangdong Provincial People's Stadium	25,914	Guangzhou	Guangdong	
173		Xiwai Stadium	25,913	Dazhou	Sichuan	
174		Xilingol Stadium	25,685	Xilinhot	Inner Mongolia	
175		Liupanshui Stadium	25,450	Liupanshui	Guizhou	
176		Yongchuan Stadium	25,017	Chongqing	Chongqing	
177		Jiangmen Sports Centre Stadium	25,000	Jiangmen	Guangdong	
178		Nanhe Sports Centre Stadium	25,000	Mianyang	Sichuan	
179		Longyan City Stadium	25,000	Longyan	Fujian	
180		Zhaoqing Sports Centre Stadium	25,000	Zhaoqing	Guangdong	
181		Nanchuan Stadium	25,000	Chongqing	Chongqing	
182		Wuhai Stadium	25,000	Wuhai	Inner Mongolia	
183		Pengshui New Town Sports Centre Stadium	25,000	Chongqing	Chongqing	
184		Shangri-La County Stadium	25,000	Shangri-La City	Yunnan	
185		Derun Greentown Stadium	25,000	Shouguang	Shandong	
186		Ningbo Sports Development Centre Stadium	25,000	Ningbo	Zhejiang	
187		Sanmen County Jinlin Lake Sports Centre Stadium	25,000	Taizhou	Zhejiang	
188		Beibei Jinyun Cultural Sports Centre Stadium	25,000	Chongqing	Chongqing	
189		Anshun Sports Centre Stadium	25,000	Anshun	Guizhou	
190		Luohe Stadium	25,000	Luohe	Henan	
191		Xinyang Stadium	25,000	Xinyang	Henan	
192		Puyang Stadium	25,000	Puyang	Henan	
193	Jiangwan Stadium	Jiangwan Stadium	25,000	Shanghai	Shanghai	
194		Quiannan National Fitness Centre Stadium	25,000	Duyun	Guizhou	
195		Kaili National Stadium	25,000	Kaili	Guizhou	
196		Wuyi New District Sports Centre Stadium	25,000	Nanping	Fujian	
197		Guizhou Meitan Sports Centre Stadium	24,543	Zunyi	Guizhou	
198		Dianjiang Stadium	24,000	Chongqing	Chongqing	
199	Xiannongtan Stadium	Xiannongtan Stadium	24,000	Beijing	Beijing	Beijing W.F.C.
200		Yueyang Sports Centre Stadium	23,619	Yueyang	Hunan	
201		Development Area Stadium	23,400	Changchun	Jilin	Changchun Dazhong Zhuoyue W.F.C.
202		Sanming Stadium	23,000	Sanming	Fujian	
203		Baoji Stadium	23,000	Baoji	Shaanxi	
204		Shaoyang City Sports Centre Stadium	23,000	Shaoyang	Hunan	
205		Xiangxi Culture and Sports Exhibition Centre Stadium	23,000	Xiangxi	Hunan	
206		Qian'an Olympic Sports Centre Stadium	22,775	Qian'an	Hebei	
207		Lijiang Stadium	22,400	Lijiang	Yunnan	
208	Tianjin Tuanbo Football Stadium	Tianjin Tuanbo Football Stadium	22,320	Tianjin	Tianjin	
209		Dongguan Stadium	22,191	Dongguan	Guangdong	Dongguan United
210		Xinhua Lu Stadium	22,140	Wuhan	Hubei	Hubei Istar F.C.
211		Jiangsu Nantong Stadium	22,000	Nantong	Jiangsu	
212		Suihua Stadium	22,000	Suihua	Heilongjiang	
213		Zhumadian City Stadium	22,000	Zhumadian	Henan	
214		Sanmenxia Cultural Sports Centre Stadium	22,000	Sanmenxia	Henan	
215	Chongzuo Sports Centre Stadium	Chongzuo Sports Centre Stadium	22,000	Chongzuo	Guangxi	
216		Shantou Stadium	22,000	Shantou	Guangdong	
217		Fuling Stadium	22,000	Chongqing	Chongqing	
218		Ganzhou City Sports Centre Stadium	22,000	Ganzhou	Jiangxi	
219		Yichun Stadium	22,000	Yichun	Jiangxi	
220		Xiangyang Stadium	22,000	Xiangyang	Hubei	
221		Wanzhou Stadium	22,000	Chongqing	Chongqing	
222		Fuyuan County Sports Centre Stadium	21,800	Qujing	Yunnan	
223		Shaoguan Stadium	21,570	Shaoguan	Guangdong	
224		Xichang Stadium	21,532	Xichang	Sichuan	
225		Renshou County Stadium	21,080	Meishan	Sichuan	
226		Xiangtan Sports Centre Stadium	21,000	Xiangtan	Hunan	
227		Hohhot National Northern Football Training Stadium	21,000	Hohhot	Inner Mongolia	
228		Zhaoyuan Stadium	21,000	Zhaoyuan	Shandong	
229		Shangrao Stadium	21,000	Shangrao	Jiangxi	
230		Panzhihua Stadium	21,000	Panzhihua	Sichuan	
231		Liangping County National Fitness Centre Stadium	20,937	Chongqing	Chongqing	
232		Huize County Stadium	20,882	Qujing	Yunnan	
233		Zhoushan Stadium	20,800	Zhoushan	Zhejiang	
234		Chiping County Cultural Sports Centre Stadium	20,600	Liaocheng	Shandong	
235		Tiantai Stadium	20,525	Qingdao	Shandong	
236		Kuytun City Sports Centre Stadium	20,471	Kuytun	Xinjiang	
237		Linxia Olympic Sports Centre Stadium	20,410	Linxia	Gansu	
238		Yingtan Stadium	20,386	Yingtan	Jiangxi	
239		Ji'an National Fitness Sports Centre Stadium	20,380	Ji'an	Jiangxi	
240		Meixian Tsang Hin-chi Stadium	20,221	Meizhou	Guangdong	
241		Lanshan Park Stadium	20,176	Yinchuan	Ningxia	
242		Manzhouli Stadium	20,153	Manzhouli	Inner Mongolia	
243		Huainan Sports Centre Stadium	20,103	Huainan	Anhui	
244		Desheng Sports Centre Stadium	20,000	Foshan	Guangdong	
245		Baise Sports Centre Stadium	20,000	Baise	Guangxi	Guangxi Lanhang F.C.
246		Yuhuan Sports Centre Stadium	20,000	Yuhuan	Zhejiang	
247		Zhanjiang Sports Centre Stadium	20,000	Zhanjiang	Guangdong	
248		Nancheng Sports Park Stadium	20,000	Dongguan	Guangdong	
249		Guzhenkou University City Sports Centre Stadium	20,000	Qingdao	Shandong	
250		Qijiang County Stadium	20,000	Chongqing	Chongqing	
251		Yunxi County Cultural and Sports Centre Stadium	20,000	Shiyan	Hubei	
252		Weng'an County Centre Stadium	20,000	Qiannan	Guizhou	
253		HIT Stadium	20,000	Harbin	Heilongjiang	
254		Luzhou Olympic Sports Park Stadium	20,000	Luzhou	Sichuan	
255		Aoyuan Stadium	20,000	Guangyuan	Sichuan	
256		Nanhu Stadium	20,000	Zigong	Sichuan	
257		Pingdingshan Stadium	20,000	Pingdingshan	Henan	
258		Xingyi Jinzhou Sports Centre Stadium	20,000	Xingyi	Guizhou	
259		Haidong City Sports Centre Stadium	20,000	Haidong	Qinghai	
260		Fuzhou City Stadium	20,000	Fuzhou	Jiangxi	
261	Shenzhen Bay Sports Centre Stadium	Shenzhen Bay Sports Centre Stadium	20,000	Shenzhen	Guangdong	
262		Deqing County Sports Centre Stadium	20,000	Deqing	Zhejiang	
263		Zhaoqing New District Stadium	20,000	Zhaoqing	Guangdong	
264		Yulin Stadium	20,000	Yulin	Guangxi	
265		Panjin City Stadium	20,000	Panjin	Liaoning	
266		Liaoyang Stadium	20,000	Liaoyang	Liaoning	
267		Hebei University Stadium	20,000	Baoding	Hebei	
268		Guilin Stadium	20,000	Guilin	Guangxi	
269		Xinyazhou Stadium	20,000	Kunming	Yunnan	
270		Qiaoxiang Sports Centre Stadium	20,000	Quanzhou	Fujian	
271		Yangquan Stadium	20,000	Yangquan	Shanxi	
272		Chuxiong Stadium	20,000	Chuxiong	Yunnan	
273		Lhasa Cultural Sports Centre Stadium	20,000	Lhasa	Tibet	
274		Baiyin Stadium	20,000	Baiyin	Gansu	
275		Tianshui Sports Centre Stadium	20,000	Tianshui	Gansu	
276		Huanggang Sports Centre Stadium	20,000	Huanggang	Hubei	
277		Jingzhou Stadium	20,000	Jingzhou	Hubei	
278		Shiyan Stadium	20,000	Shiyan	Hubei	
279		Tongliang Long Stadium	20,000	Chongqing	Chongqing	Chongqing Tonglianglong F.C.
280		Binhu Stadium	19,656	Suizhou	Hubei	
281		Dazu Stadium	19,500	Chongqing	Chongqing	
282		Wutaishan Stadium	19,200	Nanjing	Jiangsu	
283		Yunnan Kunming Yiliang Stadium	19,050	Yiliang	Yunnan	
284		Xiushan Stadium	19,000	Chongqing	Chongqing	
285		Jingdezhen City Sports Centre Stadium	19,000	Jingdezhen	Jiangxi	
286	Beijing National Indoor Stadium	Beijing National Indoor Stadium	19,000	Beijing	Beijing	
287		Lishui Stadium	19,000	Lishui	Zhejiang	
288		Hunchun City Stadium	18,900	Hunchun	Jilin	
289		Xinyu Stadium	18,800	Xinyu	Jiangxi	
290		Qingyang Stadium	18,620	Qingyang	Gansu	
291		Weishan County Sports Centre Stadium	18,491	Weishan	Shandong	
292	Yuexiushan Stadium	Yuexiushan Stadium	18,000	Guangzhou	Guangdong	Guangdong GZ-Power F.C.
293		Wenzhou Sports Centre Stadium	18,000	Wenzhou	Zhejiang	
294		Shenzhen Dayun Arena	18,000	Shenzhen	Guangdong	
295	Yuexiushan Stadium	Mercedes-Benz Arena	18,000	Shanghai	Shanghai	
296	Indoor Stadium	Indoor Stadium	18,000	Shanghai	Shanghai	
297		Anqing Stadium	18,000	Anqing	Heilongjiang	
298		Jinjiang Stadium	18,000	Jinjiang	Fujian	
299		Alxa Stadium	18,000	Alxa	Inner Mongolia	
300		Institute of Industry & Technology Stadium	18,000	Xinzheng	Henan	
301		Xigong Stadium	18,000	Luoyang	Henan	
302		Central South University Stadium	18,000	Changsha	Hunan	
303		Xi'an Olympic Sports Gymnasium	18,000	Xi'an	Shaanxi	
304		Leshan Stadium	18,000	Leshan	Sichuan	
305		Deyang Stadium	18,000	Deyang	Sichuan	
306		Wuzhou Sports Centre Stadium	18,000	Wuzhou	Guangxi	
307		Anhui People's Stadium	18,000	Hefei	Anhui	
308		Chaoyang City Stadium	18,000	Chaoyang	Liaoning	
309		Damai Center	18,000	Dalian	Liaoning	
310	Wukesong Arena	Wukesong Arena	18,000	Beijing	Beijing	
311		Jiangjin County Stadium	18,000	Chongqing	Chongqing	
312		Yuanbaoshan Stadium	18,000	Zhaotong	Yunnan	
313	Guangzhou International Sports Arena	Guangzhou International Sports Arena	18,000	Guangzhou	Guangdong	
314		Youth Olympic Sports Park	18,000	Nanjing	Jiangsu	Nanjing City
315		Shizuishan Stadium	18,000	Shizuishan	Ningxia	
316		Xuji Olympic Sports Centre Stadium	18,000	Xuzhou	Jiangsu	
317		Tongnan Stadium	17,926	Chongqing	Chongqing	
318		Zhangzhou Huayang Stadium	17,820	Zhangzhou	Fujian	
319	Capital Indoor Stadium	Capital Indoor Stadium	17,345	Beijing	Beijing	
320		Yixing City Sports Centre Stadium	17,000	Yixing City, Wuxi	Jiangsu	
321		Changde City Stadium	17,000	Changde	Hunan	
322		Yanan Stadium	17,000	Yanan	Shaanxi	
323		Yangzhou Stadium	17,000	Yangzhou	Jiangsu	
324		Ya'an Stadium	16,500	Ya'an	Sichuan	
325		Shuyang County Stadium	16,328	Suqian	Jiangsu	
326	Estádio Campo Desportivo	Estádio Campo Desportivo	16,272	Taipa	Macau	
327		Bank of Dongguan Basketball Center	16,133	Dongguan	Guangdong	
328		Luquan County Stadium	16,000	Kunming	Yunnan	
329		Lincang City Sports Centre Stadium	16,000	Lincang	Yunnan	
330		Chengnan Stadium	16,000	Wenshan	Yunnan	
331		Sanya Stadium	16,000	Sanya	Hainan	
332		Yuanshen Sports Centre Stadium	16,000	Shanghai	Shanghai	
333		Ningbo Cixi Stadium	16,000	Ningbo	Zhejiang	
334		Jiayuguan Stadium	15,864	Jiayuguan	Gansu	
335		Haicang District Sports Centre Stadium	15,755	Xiamen	Fujian	
336		Suining County Stadium	15,646	Xuzhou	Jiangsu	
337		Poyang Lake Sports Centre Stadium	15,576	Poyang	Jiangxi	
338		Ruzhou Sports Centre Stadium	15,466	Ruzhou	Henan	
339		Wenzhou Yueqing Sports Centre Stadium	15,049	Wenzhou	Zhejiang	
340		University Town Stadium	15,010	Shenzhen	Guangdong	
341		Chengde Olympic Sports Centre Stadium	15,107	Chengde	Hebei	
342		Diamond Arena	15,000	Beijing	Beijing	
343		Yuncheng Stadium	15,000	Yuncheng	Shanxi	
344		Haizhou Stadium	15,000	Fuxin	Liaoning	
345		Ruijin Sports Centre Stadium	15,000	Ganzhou	Jiangxi	
346		Beishan Stadium	15,000	Mudanjiang	Heilongjiang	
347	Qizhong City Arena	Qizhong City Arena	15,000	Shanghai	Shanghai	
348		Polytechnic University Stadium	15,000	Jiaozuo	Henan	
349		Harbin University of Commerce Stadium	15,000	Harbin	Heilongjiang	
350		Hecheng Stadium	15,000	Qiqihar	Heilongjiang	
351		Chengdong Stadium	15,000	Ankang	Shaanxi	
352		Liaoyuan Stadium	15,000	Liaoyuan	Jilin	
353		Fuquan City Sports Centre Stadium	15,000	Fuquan	Guizhou	
354		Tianzhu Stadium	15,000	Tianzhu	Guizhou	
355		Linquan Sports Centre Stadium	15,000	Linquan County, Fuyang	Anhui	
356		Liuyang Stadium	15,000	Liuyang	Hunan	
357		Boluo County Stadium	15,000	Meizhou	Guangdong	
358	Central Court	Optics Valley International Tennis Center	15,000	Wuhan	Hubei	
359		Zhongnan University of Economics and Law Stadium	15,000	Wuhan	Hubei	
360		Longquan Middle School Stadium	15,000	Jingmen	Hubei	
361		Ezhou Stadium	15,000	Ezhou	Hubei	
362		Wujiang Stadium	15,000	Suzhou	Jiangsu	
363		Dehong Stadium	15,000	Mangshi	Yunnan	
364		Pu'er Stadium	15,000	Pu'er	Yunnan	
365		Honghe Stadium	15,000	Mengzi	Yunnan	
366		Ningde Stadium	15,000	Ningde	Fujian	
367		Yuxi City Stadium	15,000	Yuxi	Yunnan	
368		Yingdong Stadium	14,818	Guangzhou	Guangdong	
369		Rugao Olympic Sports Centre Stadium	14,815	Rugao City, Nantong	Jiangsu	Nantong Zhiyun
370		Shizhu County Stadium	14,186	Chongqing	Chongqing	
371		Hangzhou Jianggan-qu Cultural Sports Centre Stadium	14,000	Hangzhou	Zhejiang	
372		Wulong Stadium	14,000	Chongqing	Chongqing	
373		Hongchen Stadium	14,000	Qingdao	Shandong	
374		Institute of Technology Stadium	14,000	Anyang	Henan	
375		Northwest University for Nationalities Stadium	14,000	Lanzhou	Gansu	
376		Huadu Stadium	13,395	Guangzhou	Guangdong	Guangdong Mingtu F.C.
377		Zhijiang City Sports Centre Stadium	13,096	Zhijiang	Hubei	
378		Nanjing OSC Gymnasium	13,000	Nanjing	Jiangsu	
379	Jiamusi Stadium	Jiamusi Stadium	13,000	Jiamusi	Heilongjiang	
380		Huaihua Stadium	13,000	Huaihua	Hunan	
381		Yuxi Plateau Sports Centre Stadium	13,000	Yuxi	Yunnan	
382		Sanbanqiao Stadium	12,724	Bijie	Guizhou	
383		Dujiangyan Phoenix Stadium	12,700	Dujiangyan	Sichuan	
384		Conson Gymnasium	12,500	Qingdao	Shandong	
385		Jincheng Stadium	12,346	Jincheng	Shanxi	
386		Tianchang City National Fitness Centre Stadium	12,266	Tianchang	Anhui	
387		Zengcheng Stadium	12,000	Guangzhou	Guangdong	Guangzhou Dandelion Alpha F.C.
388		Huangpu Stadium	12,000	Huangpu	Guangdong	
389		Changshou Stadium	12,000	Chongqing	Chongqing	
390	Zhongshan Stadium	Zhongshan Stadium	12,000	Zhongshan	Guangdong	
391		Nanchang Institute of Technology Stadium	12,000	Nanchang	Jiangxi	
392		Ethylene Stadium	12,000	Daqing	Heilongjiang	
393	Shanghai Indoor Stadium	Shanghai Indoor Stadium	12,000	Shanghai	Shanghai	
394		Xianning Sports Centre Stadium	12,000	Xianning	Hubei	
395	Workers Indoor Arena	Workers Indoor Arena	12,000	Beijing	Beijing	
396		Changchun Sci-Tech University Stadium	12,000	Changchun	Jilin	
397		Minzu Tiyuchang Stadium	12,000	Tongren	Guizhou	
398		Ningguo Stadium	12,000	Ningguo City, Xuancheng	Anhui	
399		City Forex Stadium	12,000	Guangzhou	Guangdong	
400		Kunming City Stadium	12,000	Kunming	Yunnan	
401		Dali Bai Autonomous Prefecture Stadium	12,000	Dali	Yunnan	
402		Yunfu City Stadium	12,000	Yunfu	Guangdong	
403		Baiyun Stadium	12,000	Baiyun	Guiyang	
404		Dingnan Youth Football Training Centre Stadium	12,000	Ganzhou	Jiangxi	Ganzhou Ruishi F.C., Jiangxi Dingnan United F.C.
405	Siu Sai Wan Sports Ground	Siu Sai Wan Sports Ground	11,981	Siu Sai Wan	Hong Kong	
406		Changchun Wuhuan Gymnasium	11,428	Changchun	Jilin	
407		Nanchang University Stadium	11,000	Nanchang	Jiangxi	
408		Meijiashan Stadium	11,000	Neijiang	Sichuan	
409		Harbin International ICE and SCG	10,604	Harbin	Heilongjiang	
410		Shenyang Agricultural University Stadium	10,586	Shenyang	Liaoning	
411		Shijingshan Stadium	10,540	Beijing	Beijing	
412		Linping Sports Centre Stadium	10,200	Hangzhou	Zhejiang	Hangzhou Linping Wuyue F.C.
413		Xiaoshan Stadium	10,118	Hangzhou	Zhejiang	
414		Dongxing Stadium	10,088	Dongxing	Guangxi	
415		Shenzhen Youth Football Training Base Stadium	10,000	Shenzhen	Guangdong	Shenzhen 2028 F.C.
416		Daya Bay Stadium	10,000	Huizhou	Guangdong	
417	Siu Sai Wan Sports Ground	Guangzhou Gymnasium	10,000	Guangzhou	Guangdong	
418		Haimen District Sports Centre Stadium	10,000	Nantong	Jiangsu	Nantong Haimen Codion F.C.
419		Wutaishan Gymnasium	10,000	Nanjing	Jiangsu	
420		Rongchang County Stadium	10,000	Chongqing	Chongqing	
421		Bishan Stadium	10,000	Chongqing	Chongqing	
422		Zhangjiagang Stadium	10,000	Suzhou	Jiangsu	
423		Xihe Stadium	10,000	Longnan	Gansu	
424		Jiangnan University Stadium	10,000	Wuxi	Jiangsu	
425		Dongying Stadium	10,000	Dongying	Shandong	
426		Jinan Olympic Sports Centre Gymnasium	10,000	Jinan	Shandong	
427		Xundian County Stadium	10,000	Kunming	Yunnan	
428		Pinggu Stadium	10,000	Beijing	Beijing	
429		Yong'an Stadium	10,000	Yong'an	Fujian	
430	Tianjin Arena	Tianjin Arena	10,000	Tianjin	Tianjin	
431		Lotus Court	10,000	Beijing	Beijing	
432		Hami Stadium	10,000	Hami	Xinjiang	
433		Libo County National Sports Activity Centre Stadium	10,000	Qiannan	Guizhou	
434		Quianguozhen Stadium	10,000	Songyuan	Jilin	
435		Hangzhou Dianzi University Stadium	10,000	Hangzhou	Zhejiang	

== See also ==
- List of Asian stadiums by capacity
- List of football stadiums in China
- List of stadiums by capacity
- List of home stadiums of China national football team
- Lists of stadiums
