= List of football stadiums in China =

The following is a list of football stadiums in China, ordered by capacity. Currently football stadiums with a capacity of 5,000 or more are included.

== Current stadiums ==
Image	Stadium	Capacity	City	Province	Opened	Home team(s)
	Guangdong Olympic Stadium	80,012	Guangzhou	Guangdong		
Beijing national stadium	Beijing National Stadium	91,000	Beijing	Beijing		
Hangzhou Olympic Sports Center	Hangzhou Sports Park	80,000	Hangzhou	Zhejiang		
Shanghai Stadium	Shanghai Stadium	72,000	Shanghai	Shanghai	1997	Shanghai Shenhua
	Workers' Stadium	68,000	Beijing	Beijing	April 2023	Beijing Guoan
	Dalian Suoyuwan Football Stadium	63,000	Dalian	Liaoning		Dalian Yingbo
Shanxi Sports Centre Stadium	Shanxi Sports Centre Stadium	62,000	Taiyuan	Shanxi		
Nanjing Olympic Sports Center	Nanjing Olympic Sports Centre Stadium	61,443	Nanjing	Jiangsu		
Dalian Sports Center Stadium	Dalian Sports Centre Stadium	61,000	Dalian	Liaoning		
	Yellow River Sports Centre Stadium	61,000	Jinan	Shandong		
Shenzhen Universiade Stadium	Shenzhen Universiade Sports Centre Stadium	60,334	Shenzhen	Guangdong		
	Xiamen Egret Stadium	60,592	Xiamen	Fujian		
	Greater Bay Area Culture and Sports Centre Stadium	60,000	Guangzhou	Guangdong		
Guangxi Sports Center Stadium	Guangxi Sports Centre Stadium	60,000	Nanning	Guangxi		Guangxi Hengchen
Hefei Olympic Sports Center Stadium	Hefei Olympic Sports Centre Stadium	60,000	Hefei	Anhui		
	Longxing Football Stadium	60,000	Chongqing	Chongqing		Chongqing Tonglianglong
	Ordos Sports Centre Stadium	60,000	Ordos	Inner Mongolia		
	Shenyang Olympic Sports Centre Stadium	60,000	Shenyang	Liaoning		
	Lanzhou Olympic Centre Stadium	60,000	Lanzhou	Gansu		Lanzhou Longyuan Athletic F.C.
	Xi'an Olympic Sports Centre Stadium	60,000	Xi'an	Shaanxi		
	Zhengzhou Olympic Sports Centre Stadium	60,000	Zhengzhou	Henan		
Haixia Olympic Sports Centre	Haixia Olympic Centre Stadium	59,562	Fuzhou	Fujian		
	Xi'an International Football Centre Stadium	59,000	Xi'an	Shaanxi		Shaanxi Union
Chongqing Olympic Sports Center	Chongqing Olympic Sports Centre Stadium	58,680	Chongqing	Chongqing		
Tianhe Stadium	Tianhe Stadium	58,500	Guangzhou	Guangdong		
	Nanchang International Sport Centre Stadium	58,235	Nanchang	Jiangxi		
Jinan Olympic Sports Center	Jinan Olympic Sports Centre Stadium	56,808	Jinan	Shandong		Shandong Taishan
Helong Stadium	Helong Stadium	55,000	Changsha	Hunan		
Tianjin Olympic Sports Center	Tianjin Olympic Centre Stadium	54,696	Tianjin	Tianjin		
Wuhan Sports Centre Stadium	Wuhan Sports Centre Stadium	54,357	Wuhan	Hubei		Wuhan Three Towns
Phoenix Hill Football Stadium	Phoenix Hill Football Stadium	52,800	Chengdu	Sichuan		Chengdu Rongcheng
Yellow Dragon Sports Centre Stadium	Yellow Dragon Sports Centre Stadium	52,672	Hangzhou	Zhejiang		Zhejiang F.C.
Guiyang Olympic Sports Centre Stadium	Guiyang Olympic Sports Centre Stadium	51,636	Guiyang	Guizhou		Guizhou Zhucheng Athletic F.C.
Hohhot City Stadium	Hohhot City Stadium	51,632	Hohhot	Inner Mongolia		
Shaanxi Province Stadium	Shaanxi Province Stadium	50,100	Xi'an	Shaanxi		
	Harbin ICE Sports Centre Stadium	50,000	Harbin	Heilongjiang		
Qingdao Youth Football Stadium	Qingdao Youth Football Stadium	50,000	Qingdao	Shandong		Qingdao Hainiu
	Wenzhou Olympic Sports Centre Stadium	50,000	Wenzhou	Zhejiang		
	Jiangxi Olympic Stadium	50,000	Nanchang	Jiangxi		
Kai Tak Sports Park	Kai Tak Sports Park	50,000	Kowloon	Hong Kong		Hong Kong national football team
	Henan Provincial Sports Centre Stadium	50,000	Zhengzhou	Henan	October 2002	Henan Jianye W.F.C.
	Sanya Sports Centre Egret Stadium	45,000	Sanya	Hainan		
Qingdao Guoxin Stadium	Qingdao Guoxin Stadium	45,000	Qingdao	Shandong		
Zibo Sports Center Stadium	Zibo Sports Centre Stadium	45,000	Zibo	Shandong		
	Kunshan Olympic Sports Centre	45,000	Suzhou	Jiangsu		
	Weifang Sports Centre Stadium	45,000	Weifang	Shandong		
Shenzhen Sports Center Stadium	Shenzhen Sports Centre Stadium	45,000	Shenzhen	Guangdong		Shenzhen Peng City
Bao'an Stadium	Bao'an Stadium	44,050	Shenzhen	Guangdong		Shenzhen Juniors
Shandong Stadium	Shandong Stadium	43,700	Jinan	Shandong		
	Jinzhou Binhai Sports Centre Stadium	43,000	Jinzhou	Liaoning		
Xinjiang Sports Center Stadium	Xinjiang Sports Centre Stadium	42,300	Ürümqi	Xinjiang		
	Chengdu Longquanyi Football Stadium	42,000	Chengdu	Sichuan		
Wuyuan River Stadium	Wuyuan River Stadium	41,506	Haikou	Hainan		
Suzhou Olympic Sports Center	Suzhou Olympic Sports Centre Stadium	40,933	Suzhou	Jiangsu		Suzhou Dongwu
	Baotou Olympic Sports Centre Stadium	40,545	Baotou	Inner Mongolia		Inner Mongolia Caoshangfei
	Anqing Sports Centre Stadium	40,000	Anqing	Anhui		
	Anyang City Cultural and Sports Centre Stadium	40,000	Anyang	Henan		
	Yantai Sports Park Stadium	40,000	Yantai	Shandong		
	Yichang Olympic Sports Centre Stadium	40,000	Yichang	Hubei		
Hong Kong Stadium	Hong Kong Stadium	40,000	So Kon Po	Hong Kong		Eastern F.C., Hong Kong national football team
Tuodong Stadium	Tuodong Stadium	40,000	Kunming	Yunnan		
	Xianyang Olympic Sports Centre Stadium	40,000	Xianyang	Shaanxi		
	Anshan Sports Centre Stadium	40,000	Anshan	Liaoning		
	Xining Stadium	40,000	Xining	Qinghai		
	Shaoxing China Textile City Sports Centre Stadium	40,000	Shaoxing	Zhejiang		
	Chuzhou Olympic Sports Centre Stadium	40,000	Chuzhou	Anhui		
Tiexi New District Sports Center	Tiexi New District Sports Centre Stadium	40,000	Shenyang	Liaoning		Liaoning Tieren
	Helan Mountain Stadium	39,872	Yinchuan	Ningxia		
Guangzhou Higher Education Mega Center Central Stadium	Guangzhou Higher Education Mega Centre Central Stadium	39,346	Guangzhou	Guangdong		
Chengdu Sports Center Stadium	Chengdu Sports Centre Stadium	39,225	Chengdu	Sichuan		
	Huludao City Sports Centre Stadium	38,798	Huludao	Liaoning		Dandong Tengyue
Changchun City Stadium	Changchun City Stadium	38,500	Changchun	Jilin		Changchun Yatai
Changzhou Olympic Sports Center	Changzhou Olympic Sports Centre	38,000	Changzhou	Jiangsu		
Pudong Football Stadium	Pudong Football Stadium	37,000	Shanghai	Shanghai		Shanghai Port
Century Lotus Stadium	Century Lotus Stadium	36,686	Foshan	Guangdong		
	Ma'anshan City Sports Centre Stadium	36,542	Ma'anshan	Anhui		
TEDA Football Stadium	TEDA Football Stadium	36,390	Tianjin	Tianjin		Tianjin Jinmen Tiger
Olympic Sports Center	Olympic Sports Centre	36,228	Beijing	Beijing		
	Kuishan Sports Centre Stadium	36,000	Rizhao	Shandong		
	Jiaozuo Sports Centre Stadium	35,881	Jiaozuo	Henan		
	Panjin Jinxiu Stadium	35,600	Panjin	Liaoning		
	Zunyi Olympic Sports Centre Stadium	35,597	Zunyi	Guizhou		
	Ordos Stadium	35,107	Ordos	Inner Mongolia		
	Wuwei Olympic Sports Centre Stadium	35,000	Wuwei	Gansu		
	Nanyang Sports Centre Stadium	35,000	Nanyang	Henan		
Suzhou Sports Centre Stadium	Suzhou Sports Centre Stadium	35,000	Suzhou	Jiangsu		Suzhou Dongwu
	Liuzhou Sports Centre Stadium	35,000	Beijing	Beijing		
	Xuzhou Olympic Sports Centre Stadium	35,000	Xuzhou	Jiangsu		
	Yingkou Olympic Sports Centre Stadium	35,000	Yingkou	Liaoning		
	Zhuhai Sports Centre Stadium	35,000	Zhuhai	Guangdong		
	Jining Stadium	34,318	Jining	Shandong		
Qujing Cultural and Sports Park	Qujing Cultural and Sports Park	34,162	Qujing	Yunnan		
	Quanzhou Sports Centre Stadium	34,000	Quanzhou	Fujian		
Qinhuangdao Olympic Sports Centre Stadium	Qinhuangdao Olympic Sports Centre Stadium	33,572	Qinhuangdao	Hebei		
Hongkou Football Stadium	Hongkou Football Stadium (1999)	33,060	Shanghai	Shanghai		
	Huangshi Olympic Sports Centre Stadium	32,059	Huangshi	Hubei		
	Xiamen Sports Centre Stadium	32,000	Xiamen	Fujian		
	Weinan Sports Centre Stadium	32,000	Weinan	Shaanxi		
	Mashipu Stadium	32,000	Nanchong	Sichuan		
	Datianwan Stadium	32,000	Chongqing	Chongqing		
	Fushun Leifeng Stadium	32,000	Fushun	Liaoning		
	Hailanjiang Stadium	32,000	Longjing	Jilin		
Chifeng Stadium	Chifeng Stadium	32,000	Chifeng	Inner Mongolia		
	Shanxi Provincial Stadium	32,000	Taiyuan	Shanxi		
	Dingbian County Sports Centre Stadium	32,000	Yulin	Shaanxi		
	Tai'an Sports Centre Stadium	32,000	Tai'an	Shandong		Tai'an Tiankuang F.C.
	Cangzhou Stadium	31,836	Cangzhou	Hebei		
	Changchun Olympic Park Stadium	31,684	Changchun	Jilin		
	Xiong'an Sports Centre Stadium	31,460	Xiong'an	Hebei		
	Xinxiang Stadium	31,200	Xinxiang	Henan		
Fengtai Stadium	Beijing Fengtai Stadium	31,043	Beijing	Beijing		
	Zhenjiang Sports and Exhibition Centre Stadium	31,000	Zhenjiang	Jiangsu		
	Jiujiang Stadium	31,000	Jiujiang	Jiangxi		
	Bazhong Stadium	30,812	Bazhong	Sichuan		
Jinzhou Stadium	Jinzhou Stadium	30,775	Dalian	Liaoning		Dalian K'un City
Langfang Stadium	Langfang Stadium	30,040	Langfang	Hebei		
	Xiangyang Olympic Sports Centre Stadium	30,000	Xiangyang	Hubei		
	Chenzhou Olympic Sports Centre Stadium	30,000	Chenzhou	Hunan		
	Yellow River Sports Centre Stadium	30,000	Wuzhong	Ningxia		
	Haihe Educational Football Stadium	30,000	Tianjian	Tianjian		
	Qilihe Stadium	30,000	Lanzhou	Gansu		
	Quzhou Stadium	30,000	Quzhou	Zhejiang		
	Gaoyou Sports Centre Stadium	30,000	Gaoyou	Jiangsu		
	Loudi Stadium	30,000	Loudi	Hunan		
	Jinshan Football Stadium	30,000	Shanghai	Shanghai		
	Hengshui City Olympic Sports Centre Stadium	30,000	Hengshui	Hebei		
Kunshan Stadium	Kunshan Stadium	30,000	Kunshan	Jiangsu		Suzhou Dongwu
	Yiyang Stadium	30,000	Yiyang	Hunan		
Pingguo Stadium	Pingguo Stadium	30,000	Pingguo	Guangxi		
	Bengbu Olympic Sports Centre Stadium	30,000	Bengbu	Anhui		
	Tongling Sports Centre Stadium	30,000	Tongling	Anhui		
Yanji Nationwide Fitness Centre Stadium	Yanji Nationwide Fitness Centre Stadium	30,000	Yanji	Jilin		Yanbian Longding
	Handan City Sports Centre Stadium	30,000	Handan	Hebei		
	Puwan New District Stadium	30,000	Dalian	Liaoning		
	Guigang Sports Centre Stadium	30,000	Guigang	Guangxi		
	Datong Sports Park Stadium	30,000	Datong	Shanxi		
	Wuhan Five Rings Sports Centre	30,000	Wuhan	Hubei		
	Danzhou Sports Centre Stadium	30,000	Danzhou	Hainan		
	Taizhou Sports Park Stadium	30,000	Taizhou	Zhejiang		
	Leshan Olympic Centre Stadium	30,000	Leshan	Sichuan		
	Qingyuan Sports Centre Stadium	30,000	Qingyuan	Guangdong		
	Zaozhuang Sports and Cultural Centre Stadium	30,000	Zaozhuang	Shandong		
	Bloomage LIVE Yudong HI-ZONE Stadium	30,000	Chongqing	Chongqing		
	Zoucheng Sports Centre Stadium	30,000	Zoucheng	Shandong		
	Qionghai Cultural and Sports Centre Stadium	30,000	Qionghai	Hainan		
Zhengzhou Hanghai Stadium	Zhengzhou Hanghai Stadium	29,860	Zhengzhou	Henan		Henan F.C.
	Hulunbuir Stadium	29,589	Hulunbuir	Inner Mongolia		
	Haihe Educational Football Stadium	29,356	Tianjin	Tianjin		
	Maoming Olympic Sports Centre Stadium	29,325	Maoming	Guangdong		
	Suqian Olympic Sports Centre Stadium	29,151	Suqian	Jiangsu		
Yutong International Sports Center	Yutong International Sports Centre Stadium	29,000	Shijiazhuang	Hebei		Shijiazhuang Gongfu
	Wuxi Sports Stadium	28,146	Wuxi	Jiangsu		Wuxi Wugo
	Jiangning Stadium	28,000	Nanjing	Jiangsu		
	Horqin Sports Centre Stadium	28,000	Tongliao	Inner Mongolia		
	Changzhi Sports Centre Stadium	27,653	Changzhi	Shanxi		
	Wendeng Sports Park Stadium	27,500	Weihai	Shandong		
	Huitang Stadium	27,000	Meizhou	Guangdong		Meizhou Hakka
	Xiaogan Stadium	27,000	Xiaogan	Hubei		
Jinhua Center	Jinhua Stadium	27,000	Jinhua	Zhejiang		
	Qianxi County Olympic Sports Centre Stadium	27,000	Bijie	Guizhou		
	Jinzhou City Stadium	26,800	Jinzhou	Liaoning		
	Shuangliu Sports Centre	26,000	Chengdu	Sichuan		
	Wanzhou Pailou Sports Stadium	26,000	Chongqing	Chongqing		
	Chongqing Olympic Sports Centre Stadium	26,514	Chongqing	Chongqing		
	Qinzhou Sports Centre Stadium	26,400	Qinzhou	Guangxi		
	Yingkou Stadium	26,020	Yingkou	Liaoning		
	Huichuan Sports Centre Stadium	26,000	Zunyi	Guizhou		
	Nanchang Bayi Stadium	26,000	Nanchang	Jiangxi		
Jinhua Center	Guangdong Provincial People's Stadium	25,914	Guangzhou	Guangdong		
	Xiwai Stadium	25,913	Dazhou	Sichuan		
	Xilingol Stadium	25,685	Xilinhot	Inner Mongolia		
	Liupanshui Stadium	25,450	Liupanshui	Guizhou		
	Yongchuan Stadium	25,017	Chongqing	Chongqing		
	Jiangmen Sports Centre Stadium	25,000	Jiangmen	Guangdong		
	Nanhe Sports Centre Stadium	25,000	Mianyang	Sichuan		
	Longyan City Stadium	25,000	Longyan	Fujian		
	Zhaoqing Sports Centre Stadium	25,000	Zhaoqing	Guangdong		
	Nanchuan Stadium	25,000	Chongqing	Chongqing		
	Wuhai Stadium	25,000	Wuhai	Inner Mongolia		
	Pengshui New Town Sports Centre Stadium	25,000	Chongqing	Chongqing		
	Shangri-La County Stadium	25,000	Shangri-La City	Yunnan		
	Derun Greentown Stadium	25,000	Shouguang	Shandong		
Ningbo Sports Development Centre Stadium	Ningbo Sports Development Centre Stadium	25,000	Ningbo	Zhejiang		
	Sanmen County Jinlin Lake Sports Centre Stadium	25,000	Taizhou	Zhejiang		
	Beibei Jinyun Cultural Sports Centre Stadium	25,000	Chongqing	Chongqing		
	Anshun Sports Centre Stadium	25,000	Anshun	Guizhou		
	Luohe Stadium	25,000	Luohe	Henan		
	Xinyang Stadium	25,000	Xinyang	Henan		
	Puyang Stadium	25,000	Puyang	Henan		
Jiangwan Stadium	Jiangwan Stadium	25,000	Shanghai	Shanghai		
	Quiannan National Fitness Centre Stadium	25,000	Duyun	Guizhou		
	Kaili National Stadium	25,000	Kaili	Guizhou		
	Wuyi New District Sports Centre Stadium	25,000	Nanping	Fujian		
	Rugao Olympic Sports Center	25,000	Rugao	Jiangsu		Nantong Zhiyun
	Guizhou Meitan Sports Centre Stadium	24,543	Zunyi	Guizhou		
	Dianjiang Stadium	24,000	Chongqing	Chongqing		
Xiannongtan Stadium	Xiannongtan Stadium	24,000	Beijing	Beijing		Beijing W.F.C.
	Yueyang Sports Centre Stadium	23,619	Yueyang	Hunan		
	Development Area Stadium	23,400	Changchun	Jilin		Changchun Dazhong Zhuoyue W.F.C.
	Sanming Stadium	23,000	Sanming	Fujian		
	Baoji Stadium	23,000	Baoji	Shaanxi		
	Shaoyang City Sports Centre Stadium	23,000	Shaoyang	Hunan		
	Xiangxi Culture and Sports Exhibition Centre Stadium	23,000	Xiangxi	Hunan		
	Qian'an Olympic Sports Centre Stadium	22,775	Qian'an	Hebei		
	Lijiang Stadium	22,400	Lijiang	Yunnan		
Tianjin Tuanbo Football Stadium	Tianjin Tuanbo Football Stadium	22,320	Tianjin	Tianjin		
	Dongguan Stadium	22,191	Dongguan	Guangdong		
	Xinhua Lu Stadium	22,140	Wuhan	Hubei		Hubei Istar F.C.
	Jiangsu Nantong Stadium	22,000	Nantong	Jiangsu		
	Suihua Stadium	22,000	Suihua	Heilongjiang		
	Zhumadian City Stadium	22,000	Zhumadian	Henan		
	Sanmenxia Cultural Sports Centre Stadium	22,000	Sanmenxia	Henan		
Chongzuo Sports Centre Stadium	Chongzuo Sports Centre Stadium	22,000	Chongzuo	Guangxi		
	Fuling Stadium	22,000	Chongqing	Chongqing		
	Ganzhou City Sports Centre Stadium	22,000	Ganzhou	Jiangxi		
	Yichun Stadium	22,000	Yichun	Jiangxi		
	Shantou Stadium	22,000	Shantou	Guangdong		
	Xiangyang Stadium	22,000	Xiangyang	Hubei		
	Wanzhou Stadium	22,000	Chongqing	Chongqing		
	Yuxi Plateau Sports Centre Stadium	22,000	Yuxi	Yunnan		Yunnan Yukun
	Fuyuan County Sports Centre Stadium	21,800	Qujing	Yunnan		
	Shaoguan Stadium	21,570	Shaoguan	Guangdong		
	Xichang Stadium	21,532	Xichang	Sichuan		
	Renshou County Stadium	21,080	Meishan	Sichuan		
	Xiangtan Sports Centre Stadium	21,000	Xiangtan	Hunan		
	Hohhot National Northern Football Training Stadium	21,000	Hohhot	Inner Mongolia		
	Zhaoyuan Stadium	21,000	Zhaoyuan	Shandong		
	Shangrao Stadium	21,000	Shangrao	Jiangxi		
	Panzhihua Stadium	21,000	Panzhihua	Sichuan		
	Liangping County National Fitness Centre Stadium	20,937	Chongqing	Chongqing		
	Huize County Stadium	20,882	Qujing	Yunnan		
	Zhoushan Stadium	20,800	Zhoushan	Zhejiang		
	Chiping County Cultural Sports Centre Stadium	20,600	Liaocheng	Shandong		
	Tiantai Stadium	20,525	Qingdao	Shandong		Qingdao Red Lions
	Kuytun City Sports Centre Stadium	20,471	Kuytun	Xinjiang		
	Linxia Olympic Sports Centre Stadium	20,410	Linxia	Gansu		
	Yingtan Stadium	20,386	Yingtan	Jiangxi		
	Ji'an National Fitness Sports Centre Stadium	20,380	Ji'an	Jiangxi		
	Meixian Tsang Hin-chi Stadium	20,221	Meizhou	Guangdong		
	Lanshan Park Stadium	20,176	Yinchuan	Ningxia		
	Manzhouli Stadium	20,153	Manzhouli	Inner Mongolia		
	Huainan Sports Stadium	20,103	Huainan	Anhui		
	Baise Sports Centre Stadium	20,080	Baise	Guangxi		Guangxi Lanhang F.C.
	Desheng Sports Centre Stadium	20,000	Foshan	Guangdong		
	Yuhuan Sports Centre Stadium	20,000	Yuhuan	Zhejiang		
	Nanhai Sports Centre Stadium	20,000	Foshan	Guangdong		Foshan Nanshi
	Zhanjiang Sports Centre Stadium	20,000	Zhanjiang	Guangdong		
Guzhenkou University City Sports Centre Stadium	Guzhenkou University City Sports Centre Stadium	20,000	Qingdao	Shandong		Qingdao West Coast
	Nancheng Sports Park Stadium	20,000	Dongguan	Guangdong		
	Qijiang County Stadium	20,000	Chongqing	Chongqing		
	Weng'an County Centre Stadium	20,000	Qiannan	Guizhou		
	Hagongda Stadium	20,000	Harbin	Heilongjiang		
	Nanshan Stadium	20,000	Qiqihar	Heilongjiang		
	Luzhou Olympic Sports Park Stadium	20,000	Luzhou	Sichuan		
	Aoyuan Stadium	20,000	Guangyuan	Sichuan		
	Yunxi County Cultural and Sports Centre Stadium	20,000	Shiyan	Hubei		
	Nanhu Stadium	20,000	Zigong	Sichuan		
	Pingdingshan Stadium	20,000	Pingdingshan	Henan		
	Xingyi Jinzhou Sports Centre Stadium	20,000	Xingyi	Guizhou		
	Haidong City Sports Centre Stadium	20,000	Haidong	Qinghai		
	Fuzhou City Stadium	20,000	Fuzhou	Jiangxi		
Shenzhen Bay Sports Centre Stadium	Shenzhen Bay Sports Centre Stadium	20,000	Shenzhen	Guangdong		
	Deqing County Sports Centre Stadium	20,000	Deqing	Zhejiang		
	Zhaoqing New District Stadium	20,000	Zhaoqing	Guangdong		
	Yulin Stadium	20,000	Yulin	Guangxi		
	Panjin City Stadium	20,000	Panjin	Liaoning		
	Liaoyang Stadium	20,000	Liaoyang	Liaoning		
	Hebei University Stadium	20,000	Baoding	Hebei		
	Guilin Stadium	20,000	Guilin	Guangxi		
	Taihu County National Fitness Centre Stadium	20,000	Anqing	Anhui		
	Xinyazhou Stadium	20,000	Kunming	Yunnan		
	Qiaoxiang Sports Centre Stadium	20,000	Quanzhou	Fujian		
	Yangquan Stadium	20,000	Yangquan	Shanxi		
	Chuxiong Stadium	20,000	Chuxiong	Yunnan		
	Lhasa Cultural Sports Centre Stadium	20,000	Lhasa	Tibet		
	Baiyin Stadium	20,000	Baiyin	Gansu		
	Tianshui Sports Centre Stadium	20,000	Tianshui	Gansu		
	Huanggang Sports Centre Stadium	20,000	Huanggang	Hubei		
	Jingzhou Stadium	20,000	Jingzhou	Hubei		
	Shiyan Stadium	20,000	Shiyan	Hubei		
	Tongliang Long Stadium	20,000	Chongqing	Chongqing		Chongqing Tonglianglong
	Binhu Stadium	19,656	Suizhou	Hubei		
	Dazu Stadium	19,500	Chongqing	Chongqing		
Wutaishan Stadium	Wutaishan Stadium	19,200	Nanjing	Jiangsu		Nanjing City
	Yunnan Kunming Yiliang Stadium	19,050	Yiliang	Yunnan		
	Xiushan Stadium	19,000	Chongqing	Chongqing		
	Jingdezhen City Sports Centre Stadium	19,000	Jingdezhen	Jiangxi		
	Lishui Stadium	19,000	Lishui	Zhejiang		
	Hunchun City Stadium	18,900	Hunchun	Jilin		
	Xinyu Stadium	18,800	Xinyu	Jiangxi		
	Qingyang Stadium	18,620	Qingyang	Gansu		
	Weishan County Sports Centre Stadium	18,491	Weishan	Shandong		
Yuexiushan Stadium	Yuexiushan Stadium	18,000	Guangzhou	Guangdong		Guangdong GZ-Power F.C.
	Anqing Stadium	18,000	Anqing	Heilongjiang		
	Jinjiang Stadium	18,000	Jinjiang	Fujian		
	Alxa Stadium	18,000	Alxa	Inner Mongolia		
Guangdong Provincial Stadium	Wenzhou Sports Centre Stadium	18,000	Wenzhou	Zhejiang		
	Institute of Industry & Technology Stadium	18,000	Xinzheng	Henan		
	Xigong Stadium	18,000	Luoyang	Henan		
	Central South University Stadium	18,000	Changsha	Hunan		
	Leshan Stadium	18,000	Leshan	Sichuan		
	Deyang Stadium	18,000	Deyang	Sichuan		
	Wuzhou Sports Centre Stadium	18,000	Wuzhou	Guangxi		
	Hefei Stadium	18,000	Hefei	Anhui		
	Chaoyang City Stadium	18,000	Chaoyang	Liaoning		
	Jiangjin County Stadium	18,000	Chongqing	Chongqing		
	Yuanbaoshan Stadium	18,000	Zhaotong	Yunnan		
Nanjing Youth Olympic Sports Park	Youth Olympic Sports Park	18,000	Nanjing	Jiangsu		Nanjing City
	Shizuishan Stadium	18,000	Shizuishan	Ningxia		
	Xuji Olympic Sports Centre Stadium	18,000	Xuzhou	Jiangsu		
	Tongnan Stadium	17,926	Chongqing	Chongqing		
	Zhangzhou Huayang Stadium	17,820	Zhangzhou	Fujian		
	Yixing City Sports Centre Stadium	17,000	Yixing	Jiangsu		
	Changde City Stadium	17,000	Changde	Hunan		
	Yanan Stadium	17,000	Yanan	Shaanxi		
	Yangzhou Stadium	17,000	Yangzhou	Jiangsu		
	Ya'an Stadium	16,500	Ya'an	Sichuan		
	Shuyang County Stadium	16,328	Suqian	Jiangsu		
Estádio Campo Desportivo	Estádio Campo Desportivo	16,272	Taipa	Macau		
	Luquan County Stadium	16,000	Kunming	Yunnan		
	Lincang City Sports Centre Stadium	16,000	Lincang	Yunnan		
	Chengnan Stadium	16,000	Wenshan	Yunnan		
	Sanya Stadium	16,000	Sanya	Hainan		
Yuanshen Stadium	Yuanshen Sports Centre Stadium	16,000	Shanghai	Shanghai		
	Ningbo Cixi Stadium	16,000	Ningbo	Zhejiang		Ningbo Professional F.C.
	Jiayuguan Stadium	15,864	Jiayuguan	Gansu		
	Haicang District Sports Centre Stadium	15,755	Xiamen	Fujian		
	Suining County Stadium	15,646	Xuzhou	Jiangsu		
	Poyang Lake Sports Centre Stadium	15,576	Poyang	Jiangxi		
	Ruzhou Sports Centre Stadium	15,466	Ruzhou	Henan		
	Wenzhou Yueqing Sports Centre Stadium	15,049	Wenzhou	Zhejiang		
	University Town Stadium	15,010	Shenzhen	Guangdong		
	Chengde Olympic Sports Centre Stadium	15,107	Chengde	Hebei		
	Bengbu Stadium	15,000	Bengbu	Anhui		
	Yuncheng Stadium	15,000	Yuncheng	Shanxi		
	Haizhou Stadium	15,000	Fuxin	Liaoning		
	Ruijin Sports Centre Stadium	15,000	Ganzhou	Jiangxi		
	Beishan Stadium	15,000	Mudanjiang	Heilongjiang		
	Polytechnic University Stadium	15,000	Jiaozuo	Henan		
	Harbin University of Commerce Stadium	15,000	Harbin	Heilongjiang		
	Hecheng Stadium	15,000	Qiqihar	Heilongjiang		
	Chengdong Stadium	15,000	Ankang	Shaanxi		
	Liaoyuan Stadium	15,000	Liaoyuan	Jilin		
	Fuquan City Sports Centre Stadium	15,000	Fuquan	Guizhou		
	Tianzhu Stadium	15,000	Tianzhu	Guizhou		
	Linquan County Stadium	15,000	Fuyang	Anhui		
	Liuyang Stadium	15,000	Liuyang	Hunan		
	Boluo County Stadium	15,000	Meizhou	Guangdong		
	Zhongnan University of Economics and Law Stadium	15,000	Wuhan	Hubei		
	Longquan Middle School Stadium	15,000	Jingmen	Hubei		
	Ezhou Stadium	15,000	Ezhou	Hubei		
	Wujiang Stadium	15,000	Suzhou	Jiangsu		
	Dehong Stadium	15,000	Mangshi	Yunnan		
	Pu'er Stadium	15,000	Pu'er	Yunnan		
	Honghe Stadium	15,000	Mengzi	Yunnan		
	Ningde Stadium	15,000	Ningde	Fujian		
	Yuxi City Stadium	15,000	Yuxi	Yunnan		
	Ying Tung Stadium	14,818	Guangzhou	Guangdong		
	Shizhu County Stadium	14,186	Chongqing	Chongqing		
	Hangzhou Jianggan-qu Cultural Sports Centre Stadium	14,000	Hangzhou	Zhejiang		
	Wulong Stadium	14,000	Chongqing	Chongqing		
Hongcheng Stadium	Hongcheng Stadium	14,000	Qingdao	Shandong		
	Institute of Technology Stadium	14,000	Anyang	Henan		
	Northwest University for Nationalities Stadium	14,000	Lanzhou	Gansu		
Shangcheng Stadium	Shangcheng Sports Centre Stadium	13,544	Hangzhou	Zhejiang		
	Huadu Stadium	13,395	Guangzhou	Guangdong		Guangdong Mingtu F.C.
	Ruichang Sports Park Stadium	13,188	Ruichang	Jiangxi		Jiangxi Lushan
	Zhijiang City Sports Centre Stadium	13,096	Zhijiang	Hubei		
Jiamusi Stadium	Jiamusi Stadium	13,000	Jiamusi	Heilongjiang		
	Huaihua Stadium	13,000	Huaihua	Hunan		
	Yuxi Plateau Sports Centre Stadium	13,000	Yuxi	Yunnan		
	Sanbanqiao Stadium	12,724	Bijie	Guizhou		
	Dujiangyan Phoenix Stadium	12,700	Dujiangyan	Sichuan		
	Jincheng Stadium	12,346	Jincheng	Shanxi		
	Tianchang City National Fitness Centre Stadium	12,266	Tianchang	Anhui		
	Zengcheng Stadium	12,000	Guangzhou	Guangdong		Guangzhou Dandelion Alpha F.C.
	Huangpu Stadium	12,000	Guangzhou	Guangdong		
	Changshou Stadium	12,000	Chongqing	Chongqing		
Zhongshan Stadium	Zhongshan Stadium	12,000	Zhongshan	Guangdong		
	Nanchang Institute of Technology Stadium	12,000	Nanchang	Jiangxi		
	Ethylene Stadium	12,000	Daqing	Heilongjiang		
	Xianning Sports Centre Stadium	12,000	Xianning	Hubei		
	Changchun Sci-Tech University Stadium	12,000	Changchun	Jilin		
	Minzu Tiyuchang Stadium	12,000	Tongren	Guizhou		
	Ningguo Stadium	12,000	Xuancheng	Anhui		
	Fangchang County Stadium	12,000	Wuhu	Anhui		
	Kunming City Stadium	12,000	Kunming	Yunnan		
	Dali Bai Autonomous Prefecture Stadium	12,000	Dali	Yunnan		
	Yunfu City Stadium	12,000	Yunfu	Guangdong		
	Dingnan Youth Football Training Centre Stadium	12,000	Ganzhou	Jiangxi		Ganzhou Ruishi F.C., Jiangxi Dingnan United F.C.
Siu Sai Wan Sports Ground	Siu Sai Wan Sports Ground	11,981	Siu Sai Wan	Hong Kong		
	Zhejiang Normal University East Stadium	11,349	Jinhua	Zhejiang		
	Nanchang University Stadium	11,000	Nanchang	Jiangxi		
	Meijiashan Stadium	11,000	Neijiang	Sichuan		
	Shenyang Agricultural University Stadium	10,586	Shenyang	Liaoning		
	Shijingshan Stadium	10,540	Beijing	Beijing		
	Linping Sports Centre Stadium	10,200	Hangzhou	Zhejiang		Hangzhou Linping Wuyue F.C.
	Dongxing Stadium	10,088	Dongxing	Guangxi		
	Xiaoshan Sports Centre Stadium	10,118	Hangzhou	Zhejiang		
	Shenzhen Youth Football Training Base Stadium	10,000	Shenzhen	Guangdong		Shenzhen 2028 F.C.
	Daya Bay Stadium	10,000	Huizhou	Guangdong		
	Rongchang County Stadium	10,000	Chongqing	Chongqing		
	Bishan Stadium	10,000	Chongqing	Chongqing		
	Zhangjiagang Stadium	10,000	Suzhou	Jiangsu		
	Xihe Stadium	10,000	Longnan	Gansu		
	Jiangnan University Stadium	10,000	Wuxi	Jiangsu		
	Dongying Stadium	10,000	Dongying	Shandong		
	Xundian County Stadium	10,000	Kunming	Yunnan		
	Pinggu Stadium	10,000	Beijing	Beijing		
	Haimen District Sports Centre Stadium	10,000	Nantong	Jiangsu		Nantong Haimen Codion F.C.
	Yong'an Stadium	10,000	Yong'an	Fujian		
	Hami Stadium	10,000	Hami	Xinjiang		
	Libo County National Sports Activity Centre Stadium	10,000	Qiannan	Guizhou		
	Quianguozhen Stadium	10,000	Songyuan	Jilin		
	Hangzhou Dianzi University Stadium	10,000	Hangzhou	Zhejiang		
	Jiading Stadium	9,704	Shanghai	Shanghai		
	Mianzhu Sports Centre Stadium	9,000	Mianzhu	Sichuan		
	Jinjiang City Football Training Centre Stadium	8,000	Jinjiang	Fujian		
	Nanhai District Stadium	8,000	Foshan	Guangdong		
	Xiamen People's Stadium	7,000	Xiamen	Fujian		
Hunan Provincial People's Stadium	Hunan Provincial People's Stadium	6,000	Changsha	Hunan		
	Hohai University Stadium	5,000	Nanjing	Jiangsu		
	Jimo City Stadium	5,000	Qingdao	Shandong		

== Under construction ==
#	Image	Stadium	Capacity	City	Home team	Opened
1		Guangzhou Football Park	74,707	Guangzhou		TBD

== Former ==
#	Image	Stadium	Capacity	City	Home team	Opened	Demolished
1	Workers Stadium	Workers' Stadium (1959)	65,094	Beijing	Beijing Guoan	1959	2020
2		Wulihe Stadium	65,000	Shenyang	Shenyang Ginde	1989	2007
3	Dalian People's Stadium	Dalian People's Stadium	55,843	Dalian	Dalian Shide	1976	2009
4		Green Island Stadium	36,000	Shenyang		2003	2012
5		Hongkou Football Stadium (1955)	35,000	Shanghai	Shanghai Shenhua	1955	1998
6		Shenzhen Stadium	32,500	Shenzhen	Shenzhen F.C.	1993	2020
7		Yanji People's Stadium	30,000	Yanji	Yanbian Changbaishan	TBD	2013
8		Minyuan Stadium	18,000	Tianjin		1926	2012

== See also ==
- Football in China
- List of stadiums in China
- List of home stadiums of China national football team
- List of Asian stadiums by capacity
- List of association football stadiums by capacity
- List of association football stadiums by country
- List of sports venues by capacity
- Lists of stadiums
