= Huangpu Sports Center =

Sports venue in Guangzhou, China

- Interactive map of Huangpu Sports Center
- Location: Guangzhou, Guangdong, China
- Coordinates: 23°07′02″N 113°27′04″E
- Capacity: 12,000

Tenants
- Guangdong Sunray Cave (2009, 2014); Guangdong GZ-Power (2024–present)

The Huangpu Sports Centre Stadium (Chinese: 黄埔体育中心) is a multi-purpose stadium in Huangpu District, Guangzhou, China. the stadium has a capacity of 12,000 people.

== See also ==
- List of football stadiums in China
- List of stadiums in China
- Lists of stadiums
