= Wuwei Olympic Sports Center Stadium =

Sports venue in Gansu, China

Wuwei City Stadium
- 武威市体育场
- Interactive map of Wuwei City Stadium
- Location: Northwest side of Wuwei Vocational College, Huangtai Road, Liangzhou District, Wuwei, Gansu, China
- Coordinates: 37.9293°N 102.6010°E
- Owner: Wuwei Municipal Government
- Capacity: 21,532 (fixed seats)
- Surface: artificial turf

Construction
- Opened: August 2022
- Cost: 157 million yuan
- Architects: Tsinghua University Architectural Design & Research Institute (THAD); Lanzhou Jiaotong University Design & Research Institute

The Wuwei City Stadium (Chinese: 武威市体育场) is a multi-purpose stadium located in Wuwei, Gansu Province, China. It is a Class B medium-sized stadium and serves as a shared facility between the city and Wuwei Vocational College.

== History and construction ==
The stadium was constructed as a joint city-campus project and classified as a major municipal engineering project. By May 2022, the civil works, steel structure, lighthouse engineering, membrane structure, and spectator seating installation had been completed, with the artificial turf football pitch and running track surface works progressing in sequence. The project was completed in August 2022.

== Design and facilities ==
The stadium occupies a total area of 120 mu (approximately 34,401 square meters) with a total building area of 26,977.59 square meters. It has a total investment of approximately 157 million yuan.

The structure is designed with a spatial cantilevered steel truss system. The stadium features 21,532 fixed seats, including 140 presidential seats, 46 accessible seats, and 21,346 standard and temporary seats.

The venue includes an 8-lane 400-meter standard synthetic running track, an artificial turf football pitch, pole vault and long jump facilities, a 100-meter straight track, and a steeplechase water jump. The design was created by Tsinghua University Architectural Design & Research Institute (THAD) in collaboration with Lanzhou Jiaotong University Design & Research Institute, featuring sharp angular lines intended to evoke the tension of an arrow on a bowstring, symbolizing athletic dynamism.

The stadium also serves as an emergency shelter facility for the city.

== Events ==
Since its opening, the stadium has hosted various municipal sports activities. In 2023, Wuwei organized the "Run, Youth!" children's and youth fitness campaign, with county-level student sports competitions held across the city. The same year, the city hosted the 2023 "Sports Lottery Cup" Community Games and the national table tennis city league (Gansu division) at the sports centre. In August 2023, the "Li-Ning · DHS Cup" China Table Tennis Association Member League (Wuwei station) was held in the city, attracting over 520 participants from 17 provinces.

In 2023, the stadium was also used for municipal government staff sports meetings, including badminton competitions held at the adjacent gymnasium. The venue is also used for football events, including the 2023 "Sports Lottery Cup" eight-a-side football tournament and the Gansu Provincial 4th National Fitness Games football qualifiers.

== Operation ==
The stadium operates as part of Wuwei's public sports service system. The city has implemented free and low-cost opening policies for public sports venues, with funding secured through national and provincial subsidies for large sports venue operations. In 2023, Wuwei received 4.493 million yuan in subsidies for free or low-cost opening of public sports facilities, offering free or half-price access to minors.

== See also ==
- List of football stadiums in China
