= Luzhou Olympic Sports Park =

Park and sports venue in Luzhou, Sichuan, China

- Location in Sichuan Luzhou Olympic Sports Park (China)
- Location: Luzhou, Sichuan, China
- Coordinates: 28.9068°N 105.4156°E
- Capacity: 20,000

Construction
- Opened: 2013

The Luzhou Olympic Sports Park (Chinese: 泸州奥林匹克体育公园) is a public park and sports venue in Luzhou, Sichuan, China, near Southwest Medical University. The park has a multi-purpose stadium named Luzhou Olympic Sports Park Stadium with a seating capacity of 20,000, a natatorium, ten tennis courts, and athletes' apartments. Construction began in 2012, and the park and stadium were opened in 2013.

== See also ==
- List of football stadiums in China
- List of stadiums in China
- Lists of stadiums
