= Jinshan Sports Centre =

Football stadium in Shanghai, China

Jinshan Football Stadium 金山足球场
- Interactive map of Jinshan Football Stadium 金山足球场
- Location: Jinshan District, Shanghai
- Coordinates: 30°47′12″N 121°19′29″E
- Owner: Jinshan Government
- Capacity: 30,000
- Surface: Grass

Construction
- Opened: 28 August 2007

Tenants
- Shanghai Port B (2024-); Shanghai Shenxin (2012, 2014, 2016-2019); Shanghai Zobon (2011, 2012(Outfield)); Shanghai East Asia (2008); Shanghai Shenhua (2007.9.9-22)

Jinshan Football Stadium (simplified Chinese: 金山足球场; traditional Chinese: 金山足球場) is a multi-use stadium in Jinshan District, Shanghai. It is currently used mostly for football matches. The stadium has a capacity of 30,000 people.

== See also ==
- List of football stadiums in China
- List of stadiums in China
- Lists of stadiums
