= Anyang City Cultural and Sports Centre Stadium =

Sports venue in Henan, China

- 安阳市文体中心体育场
- Location: South of Wenchang Avenue, East of Zhonghua Road, Wenfeng District, Anyang, Henan, China
- Owner: Anyang Municipal Government
- Operator: Shanghai Baoye Investment and Operation Management Co., Ltd.
- Capacity: 40,000
- Surface: Grass

Construction
- Groundbreaking: 25 April 2019
- Opened: 20 August 2022
- Cost: 3.39 billion yuan (total complex)

The Anyang City Cultural and Sports Centre Stadium (Chinese: 安阳市文体中心体育场) is a multi-purpose stadium located in Anyang, Henan Province, China. It is the main venue of the Anyang City Cultural and Sports Centre complex and has a seating capacity of 40,000 spectators.

== History and construction ==
The stadium was constructed as part of the Anyang City Cultural and Sports Centre project, a public-private partnership (PPP) undertaken by Shanghai Baoye Group. Construction began on 25 April 2019. The steel structure for the stadium's gymnasium was successfully hoisted into place in October 2019, marking the beginning of the main construction phase.

The stadium was delivered in April 2022 and opened to the public on 20 August 2022. The entire complex was listed as a key livelihood project for Anyang City and a major project for Henan Province.

== Design and facilities ==
The stadium has a total construction area of approximately 41,000 square meters and a seating capacity of 40,000. The building is an elliptical structure with a diameter of 252 meters and a height of 46.9 meters. It comprises two above-ground floors with partial third and fourth floors.

The stadium's curtain wall spans approximately 40,000 square meters and features a "cloud-and-thunder pattern" design with embedded oracle bone script characters, reflecting Anyang's identity as the ancient capital of the Shang dynasty and the birthplace of Chinese writing. The interior is divided into three functional zones: competition facilities, public operation areas, and the competition field itself, meeting the requirements for Class B sporting events.

== Complex and surrounding facilities ==
The stadium is part of the larger Anyang City Cultural and Sports Centre, which covers a total area of 547,000 square meters (approximately 821 mu) with a total building area of 220,000 square meters. The complex is divided into a northern cultural centre and a southern sports centre. The cultural centre includes a grand theatre, concert hall, cultural centre, and science and technology museum with a total area of 96,000 square meters. The sports centre, with a total area of 116,000 square meters, comprises the stadium, an indoor gymnasium with 6,000 seats, and a swimming pool with a 1,500-seat spectator capacity.

== Events ==
=== Sports events ===
Since opening, the stadium has hosted various cultural and sports activities. The complex has accommodated over 350 events and served millions of visitors annually.

The stadium and its surrounding plaza have served as the main venue for the Anyang Aviation Sports and Culture Tourism Festival. The 15th edition opened on 28 September 2023, the 16th edition was held in September 2024, and the 17th edition opened on 26 September 2025 at the complex's cultural plaza.

=== Concerts and entertainment ===
The stadium is equipped to host large-scale concerts. On 1 January 2026, the "Boundless Sky" New Year Concert was held at the complex's grand theatre, featuring local musicians and attracting significant public attention. The New Year period concert and associated fitness exhibitions at the sports centre were reported as key cultural events for the city.

== Operation ==
The Anyang City Cultural and Sports Centre is operated by Shanghai Baoye Investment and Operation Management Company, representing the company's first integrated investment, construction, and operation project. The project manager received the "Emerging Sports Entrepreneur of the Year" award at the 9th SportIN Sports Trend Industry Conference in 2024.

== See also ==
- Anyang
- List of football stadiums in China
