= Tianjin Tuanbo Football Stadium =

Football stadium in Tianjin, China

Coordinates: 38°58′10″N 117°04′27″E

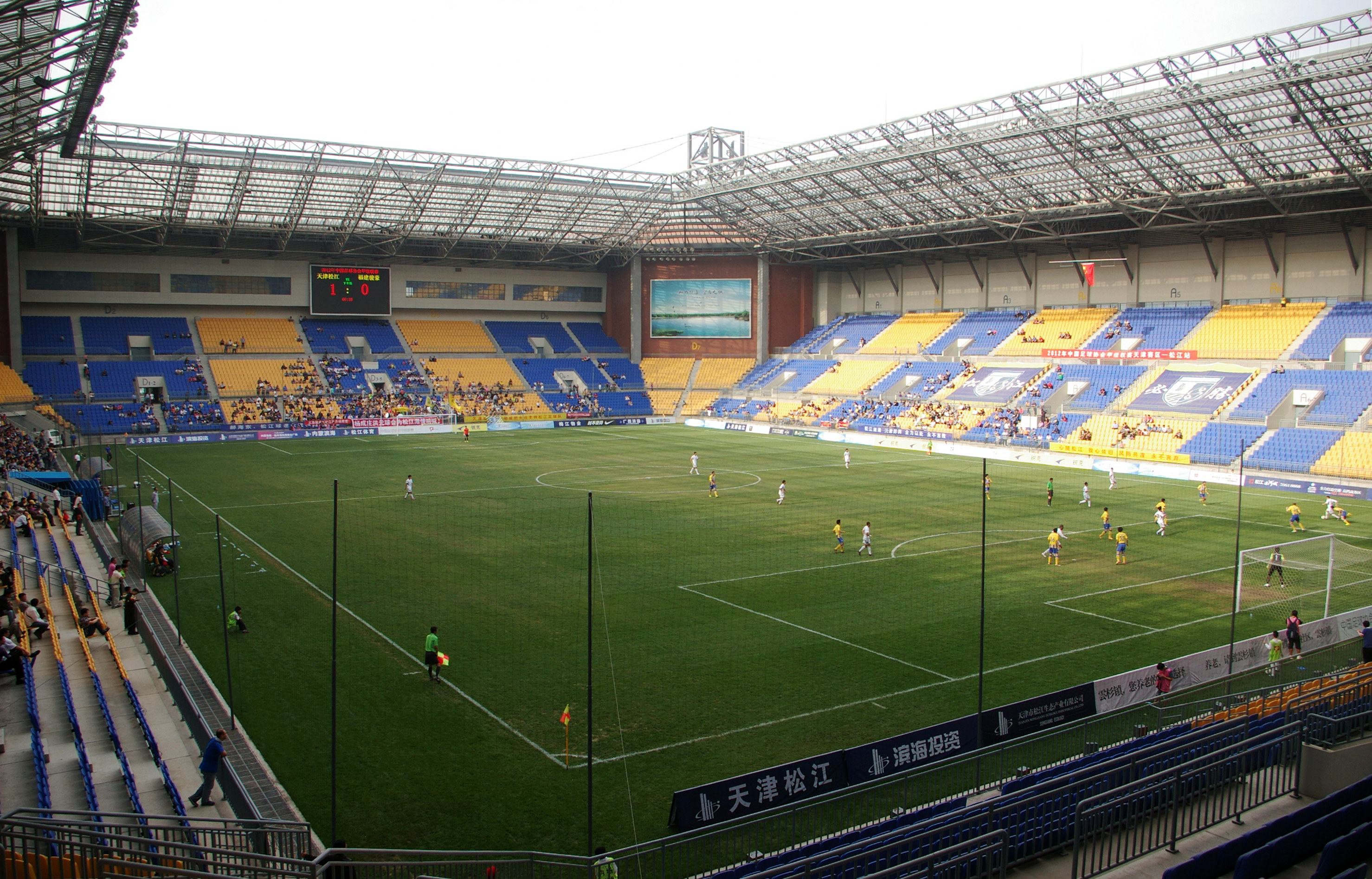
- Interactive map of Tianjin Tuanbo Football Stadium
- Full name: Tianjin Tuanbo Football Stadium
- Location: Tianjin, China
- Capacity: 22,320

Construction
- Groundbreaking: 2010
- Opened: 2012

Tenants
- Tianjin Quanjian F.C. (2012–2015); Tianjin TEDA F.C. (2017)

Tianjin Tuanbo Football Stadium (Simplified Chinese: 天津团泊足球场) is a professional football stadium in Tianjin, China. The stadium holds 22,320 spectators and opened in 2012.

== See also ==
- List of football stadiums in China
- List of stadiums in China
- Lists of stadiums
