= Haihe Educational Football Stadium =

Sports venue in Tianjin, China

- Interactive map of Haihe Educational Football Stadium
- Full name: Haihe Educational Football Stadium
- Location: Tianjin, China
- Coordinates: 39.006941°N 117.351801°E
- Capacity: 29,356
- Surface: Grass

Construction
- Opened: 2011

Tenant
- Tianjin Quanjian (2013, 2016–2018)

The Haihe Educational Football Stadium is a multi-purpose stadium in Tianjin, China. The stadium was built in 2011, and opened in 2012. The stadium hosted the women's football event of the 2013 East Asian Games in Tianjin.

== See also ==
- List of football stadiums in China
- List of stadiums in China
- Lists of stadiums
