= Lianyungang Sports Center Stadium =

Sports stadium in Jiangsu, China

Coordinates: 34.6587°N 119.2271°E

- Interactive map of Lianyungang Sports Center Stadium
- Location: Huaguoshan Avenue, Haizhou District, Lianyungang, Jiangsu, China
- Owner: Lianyungang Municipal Government
- Operator: Lianyungang Sports Center
- Capacity: 30,000
- Surface: Natural grass (football), Polyurethane (athletics track)

Construction
- Built: 2006-2012
- Opened: July 2012
- Renovated: 2024-2025
- Cost: 1.1 billion RMB (entire complex)
- Architects: Tongji University Architectural Design and Research Institute

Lianyungang Sports Center Stadium (Chinese: 连云港体育中心体育场) is a multi-purpose sports stadium located in Lianyungang, Jiangsu Province, China. The stadium serves as the centerpiece of the Lianyungang Sports Center complex and has a seating capacity of 30,000 spectators.

== Design and construction ==
The stadium was designed by the Tongji University Architectural Design and Research Institute, a firm known for designing numerous sports venues across China. Construction of the entire Lianyungang Sports Center complex began in December 2006, with the stadium itself completed in July 2012.

== Facilities and features ==
The spectator seating is distributed across multiple levels, including a main stand with 251 VIP seats, second-level stands on the east, south, west, and north sides, and third-level stands on the east and west sides, for a total of 30,000 seats. The stadium includes comprehensive functional spaces such as 22 VIP rooms, press and broadcasting facilities, athlete and referee resting areas, and commercial spaces totaling 6,070 square meters.

== Renovation for 2026 Jiangsu Provincial Games ==
In preparation for the 21st Jiangsu Provincial Games scheduled for October 2026, the stadium underwent a systematic renovation beginning in June 2024. The renovation project, with a total investment of 250 million RMB, aims to transform the center into a comprehensive sports service complex integrating competitions, fitness, commercial, and cultural functions.
