= Zunyi Olympic Sports Centre Stadium =

Multi-purpose stadium in Zunyi, Guizhou, China

- "Petal Stadium" "Red Bloom Arena"
- Interactive map of Zunyi Olympic Sports Centre Stadium
- Location: Olympic Road, Xinpu New District, Zunyi, Guizhou, China
- Coordinates: 27°43′3″N 107°3′18″E
- Owner: Zunyi Sports Development Center
- Operator: Zunyi Municipal Government
- Capacity: 40,000
- Surface: Hybrid turf (football); Polyurethane track (athletics)
- Field size: 180m × 95m (main stadium); Field size: 105m × 68m (football)

Construction
- Opened: January 1, 2018
- Cost: ¥1.6 billion (total complex)

Tenants
- Provincial and municipal sports events

The Zunyi Olympic Sports Centre Stadium is a Sports Complex, a 410,000 m^{2} sports and entertainment hub in Zunyi, Guizhou. Opened in January 2018 forms part of China's "National Fitness Program" and serves as a multifunctional venue for sports competitions, concerts, and events. Its distinctive petal-shaped design, inspired by the Yingshanhong (azalea)—Zunyi's city flower—symbolizes the region's revolutionary heritage through red-and-white architectural elements.

== Key features ==
=== Architectural design ===
- Petal-inspired Structure: Four main buildings (stadium, gymnasium, swimming pool, and training hall) mimic blooming azalea petals, with the main stadium representing a fully opened flower.
- Eco-friendly Construction: Retains natural hills as green spaces, achieving 42.6%绿化率 (greening rate).
- Advanced Engineering: Features a 39.5-meter cantilevered steel roof and vacuum waste management system.

== Major events ==
Event	Year	Notes
遵义市第二届运动会 (Zunyi 2nd Municipal Games)	2018	Opening ceremony attended by 35,000
贵州省第十届运动会 (Guizhou 10th Provincial Games)	2018	Hosted 20,000+ athletes
2023 China Table Tennis Super League	2023	Men's division matches
2023 "Zunyi Cup" National Campus Football Invitational	2023	Featured former national team players as coaches
Jacky Cheung Classic Tour Concert	2018	First major stadium concert
2026 Asian Artistic Gymnastics Championships	2026	Both Men's & Women's events were contested

== See also ==
- List of stadiums in China
