= Huainan Olympic Sports Center Stadium =

Sports venue in Huainan, Anhui, China

Coordinates: 32.6384°N 116.9935°E

- 淮南奥林匹克体育中心体育场
- Location: Shannan New District, Huainan, Anhui, China
- Owner: Huainan Municipal Government
- Operator: Orange Lion Sports (2023–present)
- Capacity: 40,868
- Surface: Grass

Construction
- Opened: May 2014
- Construction cost: ¥1.8 billion (entire park)
- Architect: Mei Jikui

Huainan Olympic Sports Center Stadium is a multi-purpose stadium in Huainan, Anhui Province, China. It serves as the main venue of the Huainan Olympic Park and is located in the Shannan New District's urban center.

== Design and construction ==
The stadium was designed by renowned sports architecture expert Mei Jikui, a professor at Harbin Institute of Technology. The overall design concept features a "dragon and phoenix" motif, with the stadium positioned as the "dragon tail" of the city's central axis. The stadium's exterior resembles a rugby ball shape, intended to create a distinctive landmark for the city.

Construction of the Huainan Olympic Park project began with a groundbreaking ceremony in November 2009. The main stadium started construction in September 2010 and completed its steel structure by the end of 2013. The stadium officially opened in May 2014.

The total investment for the Olympic Park reached approximately 1.8 billion RMB, covering an area of 56 hectares. The stadium itself covers a building area of 98,998.44 square meters and features a reinforced concrete frame structure with a ribbed lattice shell roof system. The roof reaches a maximum height of 63.4 meters.

== Facilities ==
The stadium has a seating capacity of 40,868, classifying it as a Grade-A large-scale venue capable of hosting domestic comprehensive games and international single-sport events. The facility includes one underground floor and two to six above-ground floors.

The broader Olympic Park complex was planned to include a comprehensive training hall (6,000 seats), a swimming and diving hall (3,000 seats), and a national fitness center. Additional facilities include four basketball courts, six tennis courts, five five-a-side football pitches, and one standard 11-a-side football training field.

== Operations and management ==
In 2022, the Huainan High-tech Zone Management Committee introduced third-party professional operations by awarding a 10-year management contract to Orange Lion Sports, a subsidiary of Ali Sports. The company upgraded the venue's hardware and software systems, implementing smart access control and automated lighting systems.

The center reopened to the public in July 2023 with free access to outdoor basketball courts, fitness parks, and training fields during its trial operation period.

== Events ==
Since its renovation, the stadium has hosted numerous sporting events. In December 2023, it held a star-studded concert featuring artists including Wakin Chau, attracting 30,000 spectators. The concert required extensive traffic control measures on surrounding roads including Huaihe Avenue and Chunshen Street.

In March 2025, the stadium hosted the China Athletics Mass Standard Series and Huainan Athletics Open, with 820 athletes from 20 provinces and cities participating. In July 2025, it hosted the Anhui Provincial Traditional Sports School Athletics Competition, featuring over 700 athletes from 64 schools across 16 cities.

The venue has also hosted the Anhui Provincial Youth Football Championship and Huainan City Primary and Secondary School Students Athletics Games.

== Transportation ==
The stadium is accessible via multiple bus routes with stops at the Olympic Sports Center station, Wabu Lake Road station, and Central Park station. The venue is located along Huaihe Avenue, a major north–south thoroughfare connecting the old city with Shannan New District.
