= Nanyang Sports Centre Stadium =

Sports venue in Nanyang, Henan, China

- 南阳体育中心体育场
- Interactive map of Nanyang Sports Centre Stadium
- Full name: Nanyang Sports Centre Stadium
- Former names: Nanyang Stadium
- Location: Dushan, Bai River, Nanyang, Henan, China
- Owner: Nanyang Municipal Government
- Operator: Nanyang Sports Centre
- Capacity: 35,000
- Surface: Grass

Construction
- Groundbreaking: 22 December 2009
- Built: 2009–2012
- Opened: 2012

The Nanyang Sports Centre Stadium (simplified Chinese: 南阳体育中心体育场; traditional Chinese: 南陽體育中心體育場; pinyin: Nányáng Tǐyù Zhōngxīn Tǐyùchǎng), also known as the Nanyang Second Sports Fitness Centre (南阳市第二体育健身中心) since 2022, is a multi-purpose stadium located in Nanyang, Henan Province, China. Situated at the foot of Dushan Mountain and along the Bai River, the stadium serves as the primary outdoor sports venue in Nanyang and has a seating capacity of 35,000 spectators.

== History and construction ==
Construction of the main stadium began on 22 December 2009, as part of the preparation for the 7th National Farmers Games (第七届全国农民运动会). The stadium was built with a total building area of 42,000 square meters, designed to meet the requirements for hosting national comprehensive sports events and international single-sport competitions.

During the construction process, archaeological discoveries were made at the site. In December 2009, construction workers unearthed ancient tombs dating from the Han, Ming, and Qing dynasties at the stadium construction site, which was locally known as "Gedazhuang" and "Gelaozhuang." The location was considered a "feng shui treasure land" due to its position backing onto Dushan Mountain and facing the Bai River.

The stadium was completed in 2012 in time to serve as the main venue for the 7th National Farmers Games held from 16 to 22 September 2012. The games featured 4,689 athletes from 32 provincial delegations across China, and the opening ceremony was attended by State Councilor Hui Liangyu, Minister of Agriculture Han Changfu, and Director of the General Administration of Sport Liu Peng.

In May 2022, the stadium was officially renamed as the "Nanyang Second Sports Fitness Centre" as part of a municipal initiative to standardize the naming of public sports facilities.

== Facilities ==
The Nanyang Sports Centre Stadium features a 400-meter standard athletics track and a standard football pitch. The facility includes spectator stands, auxiliary buildings, and practice grounds. The stadium complex also incorporates 10 outdoor basketball courts, 6 tennis courts, 10 table tennis tables, and two 11-a-side football pitches.

The broader Nanyang Sports Centre complex includes additional facilities such as a natatorium with standard competition and training pools, as well as spaces for table tennis and martial arts, and a comprehensive training hall containing basketball and tennis courts.

== Events ==
The stadium has hosted numerous significant sporting events since its opening. The most prominent was the 7th National Farmers Games in September 2012, which featured 15 sports including athletics, basketball, swimming, dragon boat racing, and traditional Chinese sports such as martial arts and dragon dance. The closing ceremony was held at the adjacent Nanyang Sports Centre Gymnasium on 22 September 2012.

Following the National Farmers Games, the stadium has hosted various regional and national competitions, including the Nanyang City Fourth Games, the 2019 Nanyang National Fitness Conference Aero Model and Robot Competition, the 2019 Nanyang Youth Football Championship, the 2020 Henan Province U17 Football Championship preliminary rounds, and the 2021 Henan Province Youth Football Championship.

In August 2024, the stadium hosted the "Fulin Cup" First Nanyang Children's Football Invitational Tournament, attracting 25 teams and over 300 athletes across U8, U10, and U12 age categories.

== See also ==
- Nanyang, Henan
- 7th National Peasant Games
- List of football stadiums in China
