= Yellow River Sports Center =

Sports venue in Jinan, Shandong, China

Yellow River Sports Center Stadium
- 黄河体育中心体育场
- Interactive map of Yellow River Sports Center Stadium
- Location: Jiyang District, Jinan, Shandong, China
- Coordinates: 36.808312°N 117.095309°E
- Owner: Jinan Municipal Government
- Capacity: 61,000
- Surface: Hybrid grass
- Field size: 105m × 68m (football pitch)

Construction
- Groundbreaking: 2022
- Architects: HPP Architekten, BIAD

The Yellow River Sports Center is a sports complex currently under construction in Jinan, Shandong, China. The centerpiece of the complex is a 61,000-seat football stadium. The stadium is scheduled to open in late 2026.

== Location ==
The Yellow River Sports Center is situated north of the Yellow River in Jiyang District, Jinan.
