= Green Island Stadium =

Sports venue in Shenyang, China

Coordinates: 41°39′53″N 123°22′43″E

- Interactive map of Green Island Stadium
- Full name: Green Island Athletics Center Stadium
- Location: Shenyang, China
- Capacity: 36,000
- Surface: artificial grass

Construction
- Opened: 2003
- Closed: 2012
- General contractor: Shenyang Province

Green Island Stadium (Chinese: 绿岛体育博览中心) was a multi-purpose stadium in Shenyang, China. It is currently the biggest indoor stadium in Asia, used mostly for football matches. The stadium holds 30,000 fixed seats plus 6,000 movable seats. It opened in 2009 and was demolished in June 2012.
