= Xinyu Stadium =

Sports venue in Xinyu, China

Coordinates: 27°50′28″N 114°56′03″E

- Interactive map of Xinyu Stadium
- Full name: Xinyu Stadium
- Location: Xinyu, China
- Capacity: 18,000

Xinyu Stadium is a multi-purpose stadium in Xinyu, China. It is currently used mostly for football matches. The stadium holds 18,000 spectators.
