= Yulin Stadium =

Sports venue in Yulin, Guangxi, China

Coordinates: 22°39′41″N 110°12′26″E

- Interactive map of Yulin Stadium
- Full name: Yulin Stadium
- Location: Jiangnan Road, Yulin, China
- Capacity: 20,000

Yulin Stadium is a multi-purpose stadium in Yulin, Guangxi, China. It is currently used mostly for football matches. The stadium holds 20,000 spectators.
