= Qilihe Stadium =

Sports venue in Lanzhou, China

- 七里河体育场
- Interactive map of Qilihe Stadium
- Coordinates: 36°04′10″N 103°46′39″E
- Capacity: 35,000

Construction
- Opened: 1957
- Closed: 2017

Qilihe Stadium was a multi-purpose stadium in Lanzhou, Gansu, China that opened in 1957. It was used mostly for football matches, including as the home stadium for Gansu Tianma F.C. until the team moved to Ningbo in 2003. The stadium had a capacity of 35,000. The stadium was demolished in 2017, and a new stadium with a capacity of 24,000 will be built at its location.
