= Ningbo Sports Development Centre Stadium =

Sports venue in Ningbo, China

Coordinates: 29°52′26″N 121°34′39″E

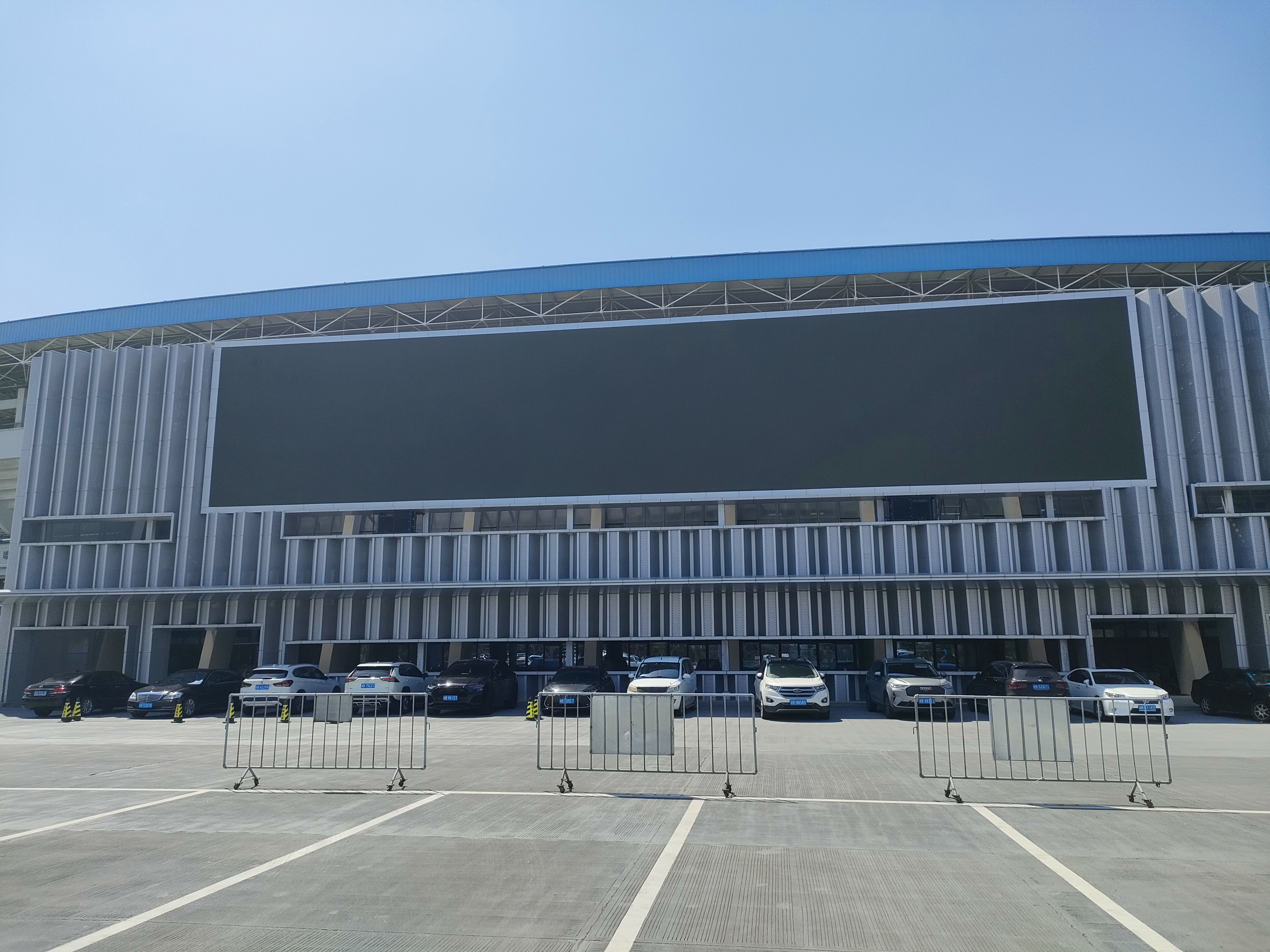
Ningbo Sports Development Centre Stadium

Ningbo Sports Center, also known as Ningbo Sports Development Centre Stadium (Chinese: 宁波市体育发展中心) is a sports complex in Ningbo, China. From 2005 to 2020 the facility was known as "Ningbo Fubang Stadium" (Chinese: 宁波市富邦体育场) and was renamed to its current title in 2020.
