= Xuzhou Olympic Sports Centre Stadium =

Sports venue in Xuzhou, China

Coordinates: 34.22521°N 117.29221°E

- Interactive map of Xuzhou Olympic Sports Centre Stadium
- Location: Xuzhou, Jiangsu, China
- Capacity: 35,000

The Xuzhou Olympic Sports Centre Stadium is a sports venue in Xuzhou, Jiangsu, China. It has a capacity of 35,000 and it is used mostly for football matches. It is also used for athletics.
