= Xiangtan Sports Centre =

Stadium in Xiangtan, China

Coordinates: 27°50′44″N 112°54′30″E

Xiangtan Sports Centre Stadium (Simplified Chinese: 湘潭体育中心) is a multi-use stadium in Xiangtan, People's Republic of China. It is currently used mostly for football matches. The stadium holds 30,000 people.
