= Xianyang Olympic Sports Centre Stadium =

Sports venue in Shaanxi Province, China

- 咸阳奥体中心体育场
- Interactive map of Xianyang Olympic Sports Centre Stadium
- Location: Xianyang, Shaanxi, China
- Coordinates: 34.4085°N 108.6355°E
- Owner: Xianyang Municipal Government
- Capacity: 40,000 (stadium)
- Surface: Grass (football field), athletic track

Construction
- Architect: PTW Architects + CCDI Group

Tenants
- Football and athletics events

The Xianyang Olympic Sports Centre Stadium (Chinese: 咸阳奥体中心体育场) is a multi-purpose sports venue in Xianyang, Shaanxi Province, China. Designed to address urban sports infrastructure needs, it combines functional athletic facilities with culturally inspired architecture. The stadium was developed as part of China's national sports park initiative, emphasizing ecological integration and cultural symbolism. Its ovoid shape resolves spatial constraints of the site, while the textured white aluminum facade reflects daylight and creates dynamic lighting effects at night. The complex serves as a key venue for football matches, athletics competitions, and community events.

== Facilities ==
Key components include: - A 40,000-seat main stadium with a FIFA-standard football field and nine-lane 400-meter athletic track Advanced lighting systems for evening events. Integrated spaces for commercial and cultural activities. Eco-friendly features such as solar-responsive exterior panels

== Design and architecture ==
The stadium's design by PTW Architects and CCDI features:

- Warrior armor inspiration: Textured aluminum panels mimic ancient protective gear, symbolizing local history
- Ovoid geometry: Optimizes spectator sightlines and site utilization
- Sustainable materials: Aluminum perforated panels and steel structures enhance energy efficiency
