= Ma'anshan City Sports Centre Stadium =

Sports venue in Ma'anshan, Anhui, China

- Interactive map of Ma'anshan City Sports Centre Stadium
- Location: Southeast corner of Hunan East Road and Huolishan Avenue, Ma'anshan, Anhui, China
- Coordinates: 31.6830°N 118.5512°E
- Owner: Ma'anshan Municipal Government
- Capacity: 36,000

Construction
- Cost: ¥1.5 billion

The Ma'anshan City Sports Centre Stadium is a stadium part of the Ma'anshan Sports and Exhibition Center complex in Ma'anshan, Anhui, China, a ¥1.5 billion municipal project covering 750 acres (50 hectares) with a total floor space of 160,000 m². As part of the city's "East Expansion South Advancement" development strategy, it serves as a multi-functional venue for sports competitions, exhibitions, concerts, and cultural events.

== Facilities ==
The stadium complex features:

- 36,000-seat main stadium with red steel canopy design inspired by local metallurgical industry and horse saddle mountain motif
- 400-meter outdoor athletics track
- 6,000-seat comprehensive gymnasium
- 800-standard booth exhibition center
- Indoor tennis hall with four courts
- Olympic-standard swimming pool complex with competition, training, and diving pools
- Integrated parking facilities and pedestrian platforms
- Connected to Anhui University of Technology's sports training facilities
