= Yangquan Stadium =

Sports venue in Yangquan, China

Coordinates: 37°50′34″N 113°36′01″E

- Interactive map of Yangquan Stadium
- Full name: Yangquan Stadium
- Location: Yangquan, China
- Capacity: 20,000

Yangquan Stadium is a multi-purpose stadium in Yangquan, China. It is currently used mostly for football matches. The stadium holds 20,000 spectators.
