= Shangri-La County Stadium =

Sports venue in Yunnan, China

- Full name: Shangri-La County Stadium
- Location: Shangri-La County, China
- Capacity: 25,000

Shangri-La County Stadium is a multi-purpose stadium in Shangri-La County, China. It is currently used mostly for football matches and horse racing. The stadium holds 25,000 spectators.
