= Xilingol Sports Center =

Sports venue in Xilinhot, China

Xilingol Sports Centre
- Location in Inner Mongolia Xilingol Sports Centre (China)
- Location: Xilinhot, Inner Mongolia, China
- Coordinates: 43.9323°N 116.0318°E
- Capacity: 25,685

Construction
- Opened: 2013

Website
- www.xlglty.com

The Xilingol (Xilinguole) Sports Centre (Chinese: 锡林郭勒体育中心) is a sports complex in Xilinhot, the capital of Xilingol League, Inner Mongolia, China. Built to host the 8th Inner Mongolia Minorities Games in August 2013, it has become a local landmark and has hosted many events including the 2017 Four-Country Women's Basketball Tournament, Asian Youth Wushu Tournament, and The Voice of China Xilingol finals. In 2015, the center was opened for use to the general public.

The sports center consists of a multi-purpose stadium named Xilingol Stadium with a seating capacity of 25,685, six outdoor association football pitches and two indoor ones, a basketball/ice hockey arena with 3,033 seats, a table tennis stadium with 30 tables and 662 seats, a wrestling stadium with 548 seats, a tennis stadium with four courts, a natatorium with an eight-lane swimming pool and diving platforms, a gateball stadium with three fields, and a badminton/archery stadium.
