= Quanzhou Sports Center =

Sports venue in Quanzhou, China

Coordinates: 24°55′46″N 118°39′23″E

Straits Sports Centre Stadium
- Straits Sports Centre Stadium
- Interactive map of Straits Sports Centre Stadium
- Full name: Quanzhou Sports Center
- Location: Quanzhou, China
- Capacity: 34,000

Construction
- Opened: 2008

Straits Sports Centre Stadium is a multi-purpose stadium in Quanzhou, China. It is currently used mostly for football matches. The stadium holds 34,000 spectators. It opened in 2008.
