= Chuzhou Olympic Sports Centre Stadium =

Sports venue in Chuzhou, Anhui, China

- 滁州奥体中心体育场
- Interactive map of Chuzhou Olympic Sports Centre Stadium
- Location: Minghu Lake, Chuzhou, Anhui, China
- Coordinates: 32.2285°N 118.3592°E
- Owner: Chuzhou Municipal Government
- Capacity: 38,865 (sports stadium); 47,000 (total complex)
- Surface: Grass (stadium), hardwood (indoor arenas)

Construction
- Opened: 2022

The Chuzhou Olympic Sports Centre Stadium (Chinese: 滁州奥体中心体育场) is a multi-purpose sports complex located in Chuzhou, Anhui Province, China. Designed as the main venue for the 2022 Anhui Provincial Games, it features a modern architectural style inspired by traditional Chinese cultural motifs, including the "Ruyi Qinghua Jinxiu" (如意青花锦绣) concept, symbolizing prosperity and elegance.

The stadium is part of the larger Chuzhou Olympic Sports Centre, which includes a sports stadium, swimming hall, and indoor gymnasium. Situated near Minghu Lake, the complex serves as a landmark for sports, cultural events, and public recreation.

== Events ==
The stadium hosted the opening and closing ceremonies of the 2022 Anhui Provincial Games and supported events in athletics, swimming, and ball sports. It is also equipped to accommodate national and international competitions.

== Construction and development ==
Construction began in the late 2010s, with the project completed in April 2022 after accelerated efforts to meet the Anhui Games deadline. The total construction area spans approximately 132,400 square meters, with a reported investment of billions of RMB.
