= Huichuan Sports Center =

Sports complex in Zunyi, Guizhou, China

Huichuan Sports Centre
- 汇川体育中心
- Location in China
- Location: Zunyi, Guizhou, China
- Coordinates: 27.7135°N 106.9199°E
- Capacity: 26,000

Construction
- Opened: September 2001
- Expanded: 2010
- Cost: 200 million yuan

The Huichuan Sports Centre (Chinese: 汇川体育中心) is a sports complex in Huichuan District, Zunyi, Guizhou, China. It was completed in September 2001 with an investment of 200 million yuan. The sports center includes a multi-purpose stadium named Huichuan Stadium with a seating capacity of 26,000, which is the second largest sports venue in Guizhou Province after the Guiyang Olympic Sports Center. It also has an indoor stadium with basketball, badminton, table tennis courts and a swimming pool. The Zunyi Citizens' Sports Center, built in 2010, is also part of the complex.
