= Wanzhou Sports Center =

Sports venue in Chongqing, China

- 万州体育中心
- Location in Chongqing Wanzhou Sports Center (China)
- Location: Wanzhou District, Chongqing, China
- Coordinates: 30.7876°N 108.3952°E
- Capacity: 26,000

Construction
- Groundbreaking: March 2010
- Opened: October 2012

The Wanzhou Sports Center (Chinese: 万州体育中心) is a sports venue in Wanzhou District, Chongqing, China, on the bank of the Yangtze River. It has a multi-purpose stadium with a seating capacity of 26,000, and a natatorium with 1,650 seats. Construction began in March 2010, and the center was opened in October 2012.
