= Guangyuan Aoyuan Sports Center =

Sports venue in Guangyuan, China

- Location: Guangyuan, Sichuan, China
- Capacity: 20,000

Construction
- Opened: 2010

The Guangyuan Aoyuan Sports Center (Chinese: 广元市澳源体育中心) is a sports venue in Guangyuan, Sichuan, China. It includes an outdoor stadium with a seating capacity of 20,000, an indoor stadium with a capacity of 3,000, as well as outdoor sporting facilities including a football pitch, eight basketball courts, six tennis courts, eight badminton courts, a swimming pool, and other facilities. The center opened in 2010.
