= Kuishan Sports Centre Stadium =

Sports venue in Rizhao, China

- Location: Rizhao Economic & Technological Development Zone, Rizhao, Shandong, China
- Owner: Rizhao Municipal Government
- Capacity: 36,000
- Surface: Hybrid turf (football), Tartan track (athletics)

Construction
- Groundbreaking: April 2019
- Opened: 30 April 2022
- Cost: ¥1.84 billion (stadium only)
- Architect: Tengyuan Design

Tenant
- 25th Games of Shandong Province (2022)

Kuishan Sports Centre Stadium (Chinese: 日照奎山体育中心体育场) is a multi-purpose stadium in Rizhao, Shandong, China. It served as the main venue for the 25th Games of Shandong Province in 2022 and is notable for its elliptical design incorporating solar-inspired motifs reflective of Rizhao's name meaning "sunshine". Its capacity is 36,000 seats.

== History ==
Constructed between 2019 and 2022, the stadium was developed as part of Rizhao's bid to host the 25th Shandong Provincial Games. The project aimed to address the city's lack of large-scale sports infrastructure while promoting urban development in the southwestern suburbs. Built by the Second Company of China Construction Eighth Engineering Division.

== Design and features ==
The stadium's design by Tengyuan Design Studio features:

- A 36,000-seat elliptical bowl with single-tier stands on all sides and a second tier along the pitch
- Radial cable-membrane roof spanning 50,000 m^{2} using ETFE material to create light-diffusing effects
- Integrated smart systems including full Wi-Fi 6/5G coverage and 230 m^{2} LED displays
- Ancillary facilities: training pitches, tennis courts, sports school, hotel complex, and public parks

The complex totals 143,000 m^{2} of floor space, including underground parking and commercial areas

== Major events ==
Date	Event	Notes
25 Aug 2022	25th Shandong Games Opening Ceremony	Hosted 17,000 athletes with cultural performances
Aug–Sep 2022	Provincial Games athletics competitions	Featured track & field, skateboarding, and rugby
Jun 2024	Chinese Athletics Championships	Hosted national-level competitions in multiple disciplines
