= Shanxi Provincial Stadium =

Multi-purpose stadium in Taiyuan, China

- Interactive map of Shanxi Provincial Stadium
- Full name: Shanxi Provincial Stadium
- Location: Taiyuan, China
- Capacity: 32,000

Shanxi Provincial Stadium is a multi-purpose stadium in Taiyuan, China. It is currently used mostly for football matches. The stadium holds 32,000 spectators.
