= Fuquan, Guizhou =

Fuquan 福泉市
- County-level city
- Location in Guizhou Fuquan (Southwest China)
- Coordinates (Fuquan municipal government): 26°41′11″N 107°31′13″E
- Country: China
- Province: Guizhou
- Autonomous prefecture: Qiannan
- Municipal seat: Jinshan Subdistrict

Area
  - Total: 1,688 km^{2} (652 sq mi)

Population (2020 census)
  - Total: 297,899
  - Density: 176.5/km^{2} (457.1/sq mi)
- Time zone: UTC+8 (China Standard)
- Website: www.gzfuquan.gov.cn

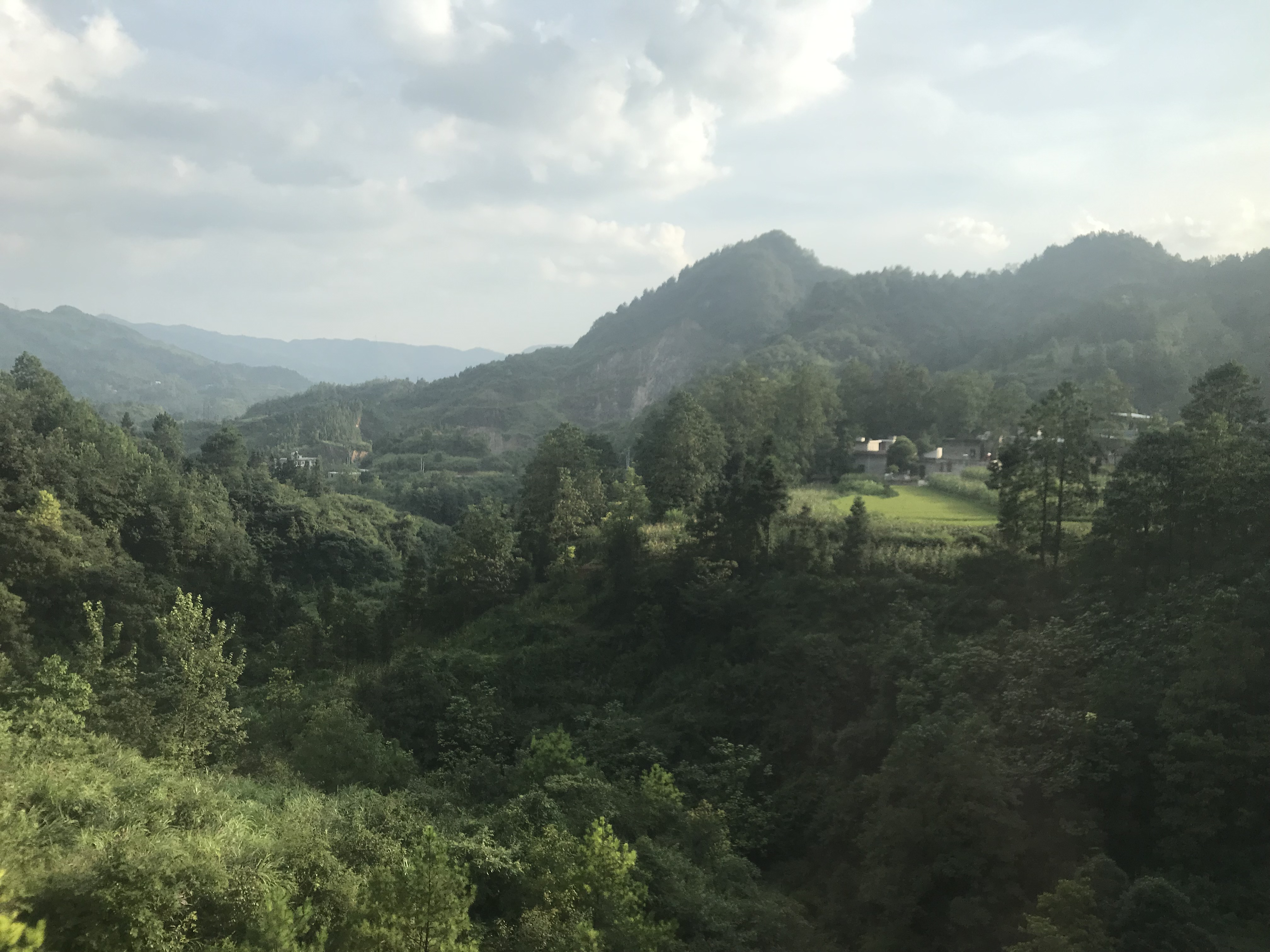
Fuquan

Fuquan (Chinese: 福泉; pinyin: Fúquán) is a county-level city in east-central Guizhou province, China.

== Administrative divisions ==
Fuquan City is divided into 2 subdistricts, 5 towns and 1 township:

- Jinshan Subdistrict (金山街道)
- Machangping Subdistrict (马场坪街道)
- Fengshan Town (凤山镇)
- Luping Town (陆坪镇)
- Longchang Town (龙昌镇)
- Niuchang Town (牛场镇)
- Daoping Town (道坪镇)
- Xianqiao Township (仙桥乡)

== Climate ==
Climate data for Fuquan, elevation 925 m (3,035 ft), (1991–2020 normals, extremes 1981–present)
Month	Jan	Feb	Mar	Apr	May	Jun	Jul	Aug	Sep	Oct	Nov	Dec	Year
Record high °C (°F)	22.9 (73.2)	30.1 (86.2)	32.9 (91.2)	33.8 (92.8)	35.3 (95.5)	33.4 (92.1)	35.1 (95.2)	35.2 (95.4)	34.6 (94.3)	30.9 (87.6)	27.8 (82.0)	22.8 (73.0)	35.3 (95.5)
Mean daily maximum °C (°F)	7.4 (45.3)	10.7 (51.3)	15.1 (59.2)	20.7 (69.3)	24.2 (75.6)	26.4 (79.5)	28.7 (83.7)	29.0 (84.2)	25.7 (78.3)	20.2 (68.4)	15.8 (60.4)	10.1 (50.2)	19.5 (67.1)
Daily mean °C (°F)	4.3 (39.7)	6.9 (44.4)	10.7 (51.3)	15.9 (60.6)	19.7 (67.5)	22.5 (72.5)	24.3 (75.7)	24.0 (75.2)	20.8 (69.4)	16.0 (60.8)	11.5 (52.7)	6.4 (43.5)	15.3 (59.4)
Mean daily minimum °C (°F)	2.2 (36.0)	4.3 (39.7)	7.8 (46.0)	12.5 (54.5)	16.2 (61.2)	19.5 (67.1)	21.1 (70.0)	20.3 (68.5)	17.4 (63.3)	13.2 (55.8)	8.5 (47.3)	3.8 (38.8)	12.2 (54.0)
Record low °C (°F)	−6.2 (20.8)	−5.5 (22.1)	−3.4 (25.9)	2.5 (36.5)	5.6 (42.1)	11.8 (53.2)	11.8 (53.2)	13.0 (55.4)	9.1 (48.4)	1.8 (35.2)	−3.3 (26.1)	−5.9 (21.4)	−6.2 (20.8)
Average precipitation mm (inches)	32.4 (1.28)	30.0 (1.18)	60.0 (2.36)	98.6 (3.88)	180.5 (7.11)	230.7 (9.08)	182.3 (7.18)	120.9 (4.76)	96.6 (3.80)	86.4 (3.40)	46.1 (1.81)	25.9 (1.02)	1,190.4 (46.86)
Average precipitation days (≥ 0.1 mm)	17.0	14.2	18.0	17.2	17.9	17.5	15.7	13.5	12.2	15.4	11.8	12.6	183
Average snowy days	5.2	2.4	0.6	0.1	0	0	0	0	0	0	0.1	1.6	10
Average relative humidity (%)	82	79	80	79	79	82	80	78	78	81	80	78	80
Mean monthly sunshine hours	32.1	45.9	64.0	87.8	101.3	84.6	147.4	163.4	121.8	79.0	75.2	54.6	1,057.1
Percentage possible sunshine	10	14	17	23	24	20	35	41	33	22	23	17	23
Source: China Meteorological Administration
