= Ordos Stadium =

Sports venue in Ordos City, China

Coordinates: 39°49′57″N 109°56′53″E

Ordos Dongsheng Stadium
- Interactive map of Ordos Dongsheng Stadium
- Full name: Ordos Dongsheng Stadium
- Location: Ordos, China
- Capacity: 35,107

Construction
- Opened: 2011
- Architect: China Architecture Design Group
- Structural engineer: China Architecture Design Group

The Ordos Dongsheng Stadium is a multi-purpose stadium in Ordos, Inner Mongolia, China. It is currently used mostly for football matches. The stadium has a capacity of 35,107 spectators, and opened in 2011. It hosted the 2012 Miss World Pageant, on August 18, 2012.
