= Huangshi Olympic Sports Centre Stadium =

Multi-purpose stadium in Huangshi, Hubei, China

- 黄石奥体中心体育场
- Location: Huangshi, Hubei, China
- Owner: Government of Huangshi
- Capacity: 32,000
- Surface: Grass
- Field size: 43,000 m² (stadium building area)

Construction
- Opened: 2018

Huangshi Olympic Sports Centre Stadium (Chinese: 黄石奥体中心体育场) is a multi-purpose stadium located in Huangshi, Hubei, China. It forms the centerpiece of the Huangshi Olympic Sports Centre complex, which also includes a swimming facility and a fitness center—collectively known as "一场两馆" (one stadium and two venues).

== History ==
The stadium is an integral part of the larger Huangshi Olympic Sports Centre project, which covers approximately 870 mu of land (58 hectares) with a total built-up area of about 120,600 m². It is among the first major sports venues in China to utilize a public-private partnership (PPP) model, a move that reflects modern trends in infrastructure development in the country. The design concept, encapsulated by the phrase "芙蓉出水, 白玉映山", merges regional aesthetics with contemporary architecture. Construction advanced rapidly in the mid-2010s, and by 2018 the stadium was completed to host several significant events, including the 15th Hubei Provincial Games.

== Facilities ==
The main stadium boasts a building area of approximately 43,000 m² and provides seating for 32,000 spectators, establishing it as one of the premier sports venues in the region. The overall complex includes additional facilities such as a swimming facility and a comprehensive fitness center, reinforcing its reputation as a hub for both professional sports and community activities.

== Architecture ==
The stadium’s architecture is noted for its modern design intertwined with cultural symbolism. The concept of "芙蓉出水" (lotus emerging from water) is deliberately employed to evoke the natural beauty and heritage of the region, making the structure a significant urban landmark in Huangshi.

== Notable events ==
Since its opening, the stadium has hosted a variety of major sporting events. In 2018, it staged its inaugural competitions including the National Athletics Sub-Divisional Competition and the Provincial Youth Athletics Championships, events that were integral to the 15th Hubei Provincial Games.
