= Xiushan Stadium =

Sports venue in Chongqing, China

- Location: Chongqing, China
- Capacity: 19,000

The Xiushan Stadium is a multi-purpose stadium in Chongqing, China. It is currently used mostly for football matches and also for athletics. The capacity is 19,000.
