= Changchun Olympic Park Stadium =

Sports venue in Changchun, Jilin, China

- Location: High-Tech North District, Changchun, Jilin, China
- Owner: Changchun Municipal Government
- Capacity: 31,684
- Surface: Grass

Construction
- Opened: 2018
- Architects: An-design Architects (Hongsheng Yang); Beijing N&L Fabric Technology Co., Ltd.
- Builders: Shanghai Tongcheng Building Technology & Engineering Co., Ltd.

Changchun Olympic Park Stadium is a state-of-the-art sports venue located in Changchun, Jilin, China. Designed as part of the Changchun Olympic Park complex, the stadium serves as a hub for large-scale sports competitions, cultural events, and community activities.

== History ==
Construction of the stadium began in 2010 as part of the broader Changchun Olympic Park project, which aimed to promote urban development. Completed in 2018 after eight years of construction, the park spans 527,600 square meters and was inspired by the Kaffir lily (clivia), the official flower of Changchun.
