= Quzhou Stadium =

Sports venue in Quzhou, Zhejiang, China

- Interactive map of Quzhou Stadium
- Location: No. 2 Stadium Rd, Baiyun Subdistrict, Kecheng District, Quzhou, Zhejiang, China
- Coordinates: 28.9614°N 118.8196°E
- Owner: Quzhou West District Development Committee
- Capacity: 30,000
- Surface: Grass

Construction
- Opened: 2022
- Architect: MAD Architects (Ma Yansong)
- Builder: Shanghai Baoye

Quzhou Stadium is a multi-purpose stadium and the centerpiece of the Quzhou Sports Park complex in Quzhou, Zhejiang, China. Designed by MAD Architects, it is celebrated for its innovative integration with natural landscapes and sustainable design, earning recognition as a masterful work of "land art" that blurs the boundaries between architecture and nature.

== Background ==
Constructed between 2018 and 2021 as part of the broader Quzhou Sports Park initiative, the stadium was inaugurated on October 22, 2021, during a multi-discipline athletic competition for Zhejiang Province. The project was spearheaded by the Quzhou West District Development Committee and aimed to transform 700,000 square meters of undeveloped land into the world’s largest earth-sheltered complex. The total investment is undisclosed in public sources.

The rise of industrialization and urban development within Quzhou, along with an increasingly popular soccer following across China, motivated the Quzhou West District Development Committee to develop such an architectural feat. They felt that a grand sports complex with multi-sport functionalities and other amenities would serve the city well. They further felt the stadium should be the center point of this project.

The stadium itself was constructed by MAD Architects, a group within MAD Studio, founded by Ma Yansong. MAD Architects has a notable resume, with impressive structures like the Conrad Hotel in Beijing, China and the Harbin Opera House. Ma Yansong is known for his innovative approaches to projects and his love for natural aesthetics. The Harbin Opera House, for instance, was meant to seem like it was sculpted by wind and water. The Quzhou West District Development Committee hosted a competition to determine the company qualified enough for this ambitious project, and MAD Architects quickly stood out. Thus, the committee set them out to design a naturally integrated masterpiece.

== Influences ==
This stadium was influenced by many different things, but the main idea behind MAD Architect's design was to capture the mountainous terrain and landscape that surrounded Quzhou. For many years, China has been at the forefront of urbanization, but there has been a push to reach farther back in their culture with recent projects and instead honor and celebrate the beauty of more natural creations.

When Ma Yansong began this project, he knew the stadium would be at the center of the complex, and he thought it would be best to play into that and create a "volcanic crater" aesthetic. He aspired to capture the wonderful nature of the surrounding landscape, creating the perfect blend of modern architecture and natural beauty. He even took inspirations from crop circles, hoping to create an almost alien-like feel with his design, where the stadium was a creation of science fiction emerging from the grassy mounds above.

Ma Yansong also made sure to prioritize the beauty of this project because of the stigma surrounding sports facility architecture. Both in China and urban areas as a whole, stadium construction is often heavily protested. Of course, the buildings serve as a great source of entertainment for the people, and a great source of functionality for athletes, but International urban research has found that many hold resentment towards industrial seaming stadiums constructed within urban areas. Thus, MAD Architects wanted to make a statement with the centerpiece of this sports complex, and they wanted to create an equally functional and beautiful design.

== Key Features and Facilities ==
The stadium has many notable features, each included for functional reasons, symbolic reasons, or both. These features include:

- Floating Canopy: A 250-meter-diameter PTFE membrane roof resembling a "halo" or "floating cloud," supported by nine pillars with a maximum span of 95 meters. The lower membrane features micro-perforations for acoustic optimization, while the upper layer is rain-resistant.
- Earth-Sheltered Structure: Over 60% of facilities, including parking and entryways, are built underground to minimize visual impact. Skylights and openings allow natural light into subterranean spaces.
- Concrete Columns: Sixty exposed wood-grained concrete walls blend interior and exterior spaces, providing structural support and aesthetic warmth.
- Landscape Integration: Sloped façades mimic nearby mountain ridges, encouraging visitors to climb the structure even when events are not occurring.

The stadium has multicolored seating, a brightly lit soccer stadium, and a full track surrounding it. The stadium is surrounded by bike paths and walkways, contributing to the communal feel of this piece. Architectural critics and magazines compliment the stadium's understanding of functionality with its unique use of materials and lighting as well as Yansong's message with grassy mounds perfectly blending the modern stadium into the landscape.

The facilities for this stadium are substantial, meant to provide large crowds with convenience and luxury. The facilities include:

- Seating: 30,000 seats arranged in undulating tiers, colored in green and white to mirror the surrounding landscape.
- Underground amenities: Parking for 3,000 vehicles, retail spaces, and training facilities.
- Accessibility: Ramps, elevators, and wheelchair-accessible seating.
- Technology: LED screens and integrated lighting systems embedded into the ceiling structure.

Key Features and Facilities Images

== Future Plans ==
Although the remainder of the Quzhou Sports Complex has yet to be constructed, the stadium itself was inaugurated in 2021 in a ceremony hosting the Zhejiang Province athletic competition. Of course, the stadium is just a small piece of this puzzle. Eventually, this sports park will include a 10,000-seat gymnasium, 2,000-seat natatorium, and even science museum by 2025. It is intended to become a hub of every possible athletic event, as well as a variety of other sources of entertainment. The stadium, remaining at the center, will host soccer matches and other competitions for the Chinese Provinces and possibly beyond.
