= Chenzhou Olympic Sports Centre =

Sports complex in Chenzhou, Hunan, China

- 郴州奥林匹克体育中心
- Location in Hunan Chenzhou Olympic Sports Centre (China)
- Location: Chenzhou, Hunan, China
- Coordinates: 25.7975°N 113.1008°E
- Capacity: 30,000

Construction
- Opened: October 2010
- Cost: CN¥600 million

The Chenzhou Olympic Sports Centre (Chinese: 郴州奥林匹克体育中心) is a sports complex in Chenzhou, Hunan, China. The centre comprises a 30,000-seat multi-purpose stadium named Chenzhou Olympic Sports Centre Stadium, a 5,000-seat indoor stadium, as well as facilities for basketball, volleyball, badminton, table tennis, tennis, weightlifting, wushu, and other sports. The center is near Xiangnan University. It cost CN¥600 million to build.
