= Yichang Olympic Sports Centre Stadium =

Sports venue in Hubei Province, China

- 宜昌奥体中心体育场
- Interactive map of Yichang Olympic Sports Centre Stadium
- Location: Dianjun District, Yichang, Hubei, China
- Coordinates: 30.7007°N 111.2281°E
- Owner: Yichang City Construction Investment Co., Ltd.
- Capacity: 40,000
- Surface: Grass (football field), athletic track

Construction
- Opened: 2020 (Phase I completion)

Tenants
- Regional sports teams, cultural events

The Yichang Olympic Sports Centre Stadium (Chinese: 宜昌奥体中心体育场) is a multi-purpose sports complex in Yichang, Hubei Province, China. Completed in phases starting in 2020, it serves as a key venue for provincial and national sports events, cultural performances, and public recreation. The stadium is part of a larger sports park designed to integrate competitive sports, leisure, and urban development. The Yichang Olympic Sports Centre spans 745 acres with a total construction area of 206,400 square meters. Developed under Hubei Province’s urban revitalization strategy, it includes a 40,000-seat Class A stadium, an 8,000-seat gymnasium, a 1,700-seat swimming pool, and specialized facilities for badminton and shooting. The project was constructed by China Construction Third Bureau and is managed by Yichang City Construction Investment Co., Ltd. It aims to host national and international competitions while promoting community fitness and tourism.

== Facilities ==
Key components include: Main Stadium: 40,000-seat arena with a FIFA-standard football field and athletics track. Indoor Gymnasium: 8,000-seat multi-purpose hall for basketball, volleyball, and cultural events. Swimming Pool: Olympic-standard facility with a capacity of 1,700 spectators. Badminton and Shooting Halls: Specialized venues for tournaments and training. Outdoor Spaces: Leisure squares, jogging trails, and green areas integrated with the surrounding landscape.

== Events ==
The stadium has hosted: 2019 National Women’s Weightlifting Championship 16th Hubei Provincial Games (2022): The opening ceremony featured video projections and light shows on the stadium’s roof and walls. International Dance Sports Open and China-Europe Dance Sports Competition - Concerts and cultural festivals.

== Design and sustainability ==
The complex emphasizes eco-friendly design, with energy-efficient systems and green spaces covering 200,000 square meters. Its modular architecture allows flexible use for sports, exhibitions, and public gatherings.

== Tourism and impact ==
Located near the Yangtze River, the stadium is promoted alongside Yichang’s natural attractions like the Three Gorges. It attracts over one million annual visitors, boosting local tourism and urban development.
