= Handan City Sports Centre Stadium =

Sports venue in Handan, China

- Location: Handan, Hebei, China
- Owner: Handan Municipal Government
- Operator: Handan Sports Bureau
- Capacity: 30,000
- Surface: Grass (football), Athletics track

Construction
- Groundbreaking: 2018
- Opened: 2023-06-23
- Cost: CNY 1.1 billion (approx. $150 million)
- General contractors: China Construction Science and Industry Corporation

The Handan City Sports Centre Stadium is a multi-purpose stadium located in Handan, Hebei, China. It is the largest stadium in southern Hebei and serves as a major venue for sports, cultural events, and concerts. The stadium was officially inaugurated on June 23, 2023, with a music concert attended by 26,000 people.

== History ==
The construction of the Handan City Sports Centre Stadium began in 2018 as part of the preparations for the 16th Hebei Provincial Games, which were originally scheduled for 2022 but later postponed to 2023. The stadium was designed to be the main venue for the games, hosting events such as athletics, football, rugby sevens, and archery. The project was completed in late 2021, and the stadium was officially opened in June 2023.

== Design and features ==
The stadium's design incorporates elements of traditional Chinese culture, particularly the "Tai Chi" philosophy, which is deeply rooted in Handan's history. The roof structure features a double-helix design, symbolizing the Yin and Yang of Tai Chi. The seating arrangement, with blue and white seats, forms a spiral pattern that complements the roof design.

The stadium has a capacity of 30,000 seats and includes a standard football field surrounded by an athletics track. It is equipped with modern facilities such as a large video screen, advanced lighting systems, and a raised platform surrounding the stadium. The venue is also designed to be environmentally friendly, incorporating green building technologies such as solar water heaters and rainwater recycling systems.
