= Xinxiang Stadium =

Stadium in Xinxiang, China

Coordinates: 35°17′57″N 113°53′04″E

Xinxiang Stadium (Simplified Chinese: 新乡体育场) is a multi-purpose stadium in Xinxiang, China. It is currently used mostly for football matches. The stadium holds 50000 people.
