= Anshan Sports Centre Stadium =

Football stadium in Anshan, China

- Location: Anshan, China
- Capacity: 40,000
- Surface: Grass

Anshan Sports Centre Stadium is a multi-purpose stadium in Anshan, China. It is currently used mostly for football matches. The stadium holds 40,000 people.
