= Xining Stadium =

Sports venue in Xining, Qinghai, China

- Location in Qinghai Xining Stadium (China)
- Location: Xining, Qinghai, China
- Coordinates: 36.6194°N 101.7722°E
- Capacity: 40,000

The Xining Stadium (Chinese: 西宁体育场) is a sports venue in Xining, the capital of Qinghai Province, China. It has a seating capacity of 40,000 and is used mostly for football matches.
