= Jiaozuo Sports Centre Stadium =

Sports venue in Jiaozuo, China

Coordinates: 35.2081°N 113.2756°E

- Location: Jiaozuo, Henan, China
- Capacity: 35,881

Jiaozuo Sports Centre Stadium is a multi-purpose stadium located in Jiaozuo, Henan Province, China. With a seating capacity of approximately 35,881, it is one of the largest stadiums in Henan and primarily hosts football matches. The stadium is part of the broader Jiaozuo Sports Center complex, which includes facilities for basketball, swimming, martial arts, and other sports
