= Zoucheng Sports Centre Stadium =

Football stadium in Zoucheng, China

- 邹城市体育中心体育场
- Interactive map of Zoucheng Sports Centre Stadium
- Location: Jinshan Avenue South, Zoucheng, Shandong, China
- Coordinates: 35.3950°N 117.0089°E
- Owner: Zoucheng Municipal Government
- Operator: Shandong Taishan B
- Capacity: 30,000
- Surface: Natural grass
- Field size: 105m × 68m (football pitch)

Construction
- Groundbreaking: 2013
- Opened: 2014
- Renovated: 2023 (upgraded for league standards)
- Cost: ¥315 million (2014)
- Architect: Shandong Provincial Design Institute

Tenant
- Shandong Taishan B (2024–present)

The Zoucheng Sports Centre Stadium is a 30,000-seat football stadium in Zoucheng, Shandong Province, China. Opened in 2014, it was built to host events for the 23rd Shandong Provincial Games, including women’s football and rugby matches. The stadium is part of a larger sports complex that includes outdoor fitness facilities and training grounds. In 2024, it became the home venue for Shandong Taishan B, the reserve team of Chinese Super League club Shandong Taishan, competing in the China League Two.

== Design and features ==
it has a capacity of 30,000 seats across four tiers, with partial fifth-tier structures. Natural grass pitch, LED lighting, VIP lounges, media rooms, and athlete lounges. Located at the intersection of Jinshan Avenue and Xiaohu Roundabout, with proximity to public transit routes.

== Major events ==
In 2014, Shandong Provincial Games Hosted women’s football preliminaries and rugby finals.

== Recent developments ==
In 2023, it was Renovated to meet China League Two standards, including pitch improvements and seating adjustments. Hosted Shandong Taishan B’s inaugural match in the third-tier league, marking the stadium’s debut in professional football.
