= Baise Sports Center Stadium =

Multi-purpose stadium in Guangxi, China

Baise Sports Centre Stadium
- 百色体育中心体育场
- Interactive map of Baise Sports Centre Stadium
- Location: Baise, Guangxi, China
- Coordinates: 23.876160°N 106.630697°E

The Baise Sports Centre Stadium is a 20,000-capacity multi-purpose sports venue in Baise, Guangxi, China.
