= List of football stadiums in Algeria =

The following is a list of football stadiums in Algeria, ordered by capacity. Currently stadiums with a capacity of 5,000 or more are included, most large stadiums in Algeria are used for football (soccer), with some also used for athletics and rugby union.

== Current stadiums ==
| # | Image | Stadium | Capacity | City | Home team | Opened |
|---|---|---|---|---|---|---|
| 1 | | 5 July 1962 Stadium | 64,200 | Algiers | USM Alger | 17 June 1972 |
| 2 | | 19 May 1956 Stadium | 56,000 | Annaba | USM Annaba | 10 July 1987 |
| 3 | | Hocine Ait Ahmed Stadium | 50,766 | Tizi Ouzou | JS Kabylie | 10 July 2024 |
| 4 | | 24 February 1956 Stadium | 45,000 | Sidi Bel Abbès | USM Bel Abbès | 19 June 1981 |
| 5 | | Nelson Mandela Stadium | 40,784 | Baraki, Algiers | CR Belouizdad | 7 January 2023 |
| 6 | | Miloud Hadefi Stadium | 40,143 | Bir El Djir, Oran | MC Oran | 17 June 2021 |
| 7 | | Ali La Pointe Stadium | 40,000 | Douéra, Algiers | MC Alger | 3 July 2024 |
| 8 | | Ahmed Zabana Stadium | 40,000 | Oran | ASM Oran | 5 May 1957 |
| 9 | | Hocine Rouibah Stadium | 35,000 | Jijel | JS Djijel | April 26 2006 |
| 10 | | Mustapha Tchaker Stadium | 25,000 | Blida | USM Blida | 26 February 2001 |
| 11 | | Saïd Amara Stadium | 25,000 | Saïda | MC Saïda | 2005 |
| 12 | | 20 August 1955 Stadium | 25,000 | Skikda | JSM Skikda | |
| 13 | | Ahmed Kaïd Stadium | 25,000 | Tiaret | JSM Tiaret | 1987 |
| 14 | | Tahar Zoughari Stadium | 25,000 | Relizane | RC Relizane | 18 March 1987 |
| 15 | | 18 February Stadium | 25,000 | Biskra | US Biskra | |
| 16 | | Abdelhamid Bouteldja Stadium | 25,000 | Skikda | JSM Skikda | |
| 17 | | Colonel Lotfi Stadium | 25,000 | Tlemcen | WA Tlemcen | 1976 |
| 18 | | Messaoud Zeghar Stadium | 25,000 | El Eulma | MC El Eulma | 1960 |
| 19 | | 8 May 1945 Stadium | 25,000 | Sétif | ES Sétif | 3 May 1972 |
| 20 | | Chahid Hamlaoui Stadium | 22,986 | Constantine | CS Constantine | 5 July 1973 |
| 21 | | The African Unity Stadium | 22,000 | Mascara | GC Mascara | 11 December 1986 |
| 22 | | 1 November 1954 Stadium | 20,000 | Batna | CA Batna & MSP Batna | 1979 |
| 23 | | Habib Bouakeul Stadium | 20,000 | Oran | SCM Oran | 1927 |
| 24 | | Abdelkrim Kerroum Stadium | 20,000 | Sig | CC Sig | 19 June 2022 |
| 25 | | 20 August 1955 Stadium | 20,000 | Bordj Bou Arréridj | CA Bordj Bou Arréridj | 20 July 1997 |
| 26 | | 20 August 1955 Stadium | 20,000 | Béchar | JS Saoura | 1953 |
| 27 | | Mohamed Boumezrag Stadium | 18,000 | Chlef | ASO Chlef | |
| 28 | | Mohamed Bensaïd Stadium | 18,000 | Mostaganem | ES Mostaganem & WA Mostaganem | 25 January 1990 |
| 29 | | Maghrebi Unity Stadium | 18,000 | Béjaïa | MO Béjaïa & JSM Béjaïa | 1987 |
| 30 | | 1 November 1954 Stadium | 18,000 | Tizi Ouzou | JS Kabylie | 12 March 1978 |
| 31 | | 18 February Stadium | 18,000 | Ouargla | AHM Hassi Messaoud | November 1992 |
| 32 | | 4 March 1956 Stadium | 17,250 | Tébessa | US Tébessa | 1992 |
| 33 | | Omar Hamadi Stadium | 17,000 | Bologhine | USM Alger | 20 October 1921 |
| 34 | | Lyes Imam Stadium | 15,000 | Médéa | Olympique de Médéa | |
| 35 | | Boudjemaa Souidani Stadium | 15,000 | Guelma | ES Guelma | 1986 |
| 36 | | Mokhtar Badji Stadium | 15,000 | Souk Ahras | ES Souk Ahras | 17 June 1985 |
| 37 | | Rabah Bitat Stadium | 15,000 | Bouïra | MB Bouïra | 2004 |
| 38 | | Zakaria Medjdoub Stadium | 15,000 | El Bayadh | MC El Bayadh | |
| 39 | | Omar Benrabah Stadium | 14,150 | Dar El Beïda | Paradou AC | |
| 40 | | Ramadane Ben Abdelmalek Stadium | 13,000 | Constantine | MO Constantine | 1948 |
| 41 | | 20 August 1955 Stadium | 12,000 | Algiers | CR Belouizdad | 1930 |
| 42 | | Salem Mabrouki Stadium | 12,000 | Rouïba | WO Rouïba | |
| 43 | | Omar Oucief Stadium | 11,500 | Aïn Témouchent | CR Témouchent | 1 July 2009 |
| 44 | | Martyrs Stadium | 11,500 | Akbou | Olympique Akbou | 19 September 2026 |
| 45 | | Brakni Brothers Stadium | 10,000 | Blida | USM Blida | 1902 |
| 46 | | 5 July 1962 Stadium | 10,000 | Hadjout | USMM Hadjout | 1924 |
| 47 | | Aoued Meflah Stadium | 10,000 | Mascara | OR Mascara | 1925 |
| 48 | | Abdelkader Chabou Stadium | 10,000 | Annaba | Hamra Annaba | 23 May 1937 |
| 49 | | Menaouer Kerbouci Stadium | 10,000 | Arzew | OM Arzew | |
| 50 | | Lahouari Benahmed Stadium | 10,000 | Oran | RCG Oran | |
| 51 | | Abed Hamdani Stadium | 10,000 | El Khroub | AS Khroub | |
| 52 | | Abderrahmene Bensaci Stadium | 10,000 | Merouana | AB Mérouana | |
| 53 | | Mohamed Benhaddad Stadium | 10,000 | Kouba | RC Kouba | 19 June 1949 |
| 54 | | Koléa Olympic Stadium | 10,000 | Koléa | – | |
| 55 | | 11 December 1961 Stadium | 10,000 | Chelghoum Laïd | HB Chelghoum Laïd | |
| 56 | | Zoubir Khelifi Touhami Stadium | 10,000 | Aïn M'lila | AS Aïn M'lila | |
| 57 | | Amar Hamam Stadium | 8,000 | Khenchela | USM Khenchela | |
| 58 | | Boucheligue Brothers Stadium | 8,000 | Magra | NC Magra | |
| 59 | | Bahi Brothers Stadium | 8,000 | Es Sénia, Oran | Nasr Es-Senia | |
| 60 | | 1 November 1954 Stadium | 6,000 | Algiers | USM El Harrach | 1930 |
| 61 | | Mouloud Zerrouki Stadium | 5,500 | Algiers | USM El Harrach | |
| 62 | | Demane-Debbih Brothers Stadium | 5,000 | Aïn M'lila | AS Aïn M'lila | |
| 63 | | Ismaïl Makhlouf Stadium | 5,000 | Larbaâ | RC Arbaâ | |

== Future stadiums ==
| # | Projected Image | Stadium | Capacity | City | Home team | Estimated Opening |
|---|---|---|---|---|---|---|
| 1 | | New Constantine Stadium | 50,000 | Constantine | CS Constantine | Late 2028 |
| 2 | | New Béchar Stadium | 25,000 | Béchar | JS Saoura | Late 2027 |
| 3 | | 27 february 1962 Stadium | 25,000 | Ouargla | CR Béni Thour | Early 2028 |

== Stadiums planned for construction ==
| # | Projected Image | Stadium | Capacity | City | Home team | Opening |
|---|---|---|---|---|---|---|
| 1 | | New Sétif Stadium | 50,000 | Sétif | ES Sétif | TBA |
| 2 | | New Chlef Stadium | 40,000 | Chlef | ASO Chlef | TBA |
| 3 | | New Mostaganem Stadium | 35,000 | Mostaganem | ES Mostaganem / WA Mostaganem | TBA |
| 4 | | New Bejaïa Stadium | 30,000 | Béjaïa | JSM Béjaïa, MO Béjaïa | TBA |

== See also ==
- Lists of stadiums
- List of sports venues by capacity
- List of association football stadiums by capacity
- List of association football stadiums by country
- List of African stadiums by capacity
- List of indoor arenas in Algeria
- Football in Algeria
