= Algeria national football team home stadium =

Nelson Mandela Stadium in Baraki, Algiers is the current exclusive home stadium for the Algeria national football team. This has been the case since it was opened in 2023, Algeria have however also played many of their home games away from Nelson Mandela Stadium throughout their history, both in friendly matches and for competitive tournaments.

== History ==
Unlike many selections, "Les Fennecs" have no recognized national stadium. Whether for the qualifying matches for the World Cup or friendly matches, they turn around the country and changing in many however stages major international meetings are usually held at Stade 5 Juillet 1962 of Algiers. Other large stadiums were used to accommodate the Les Fennecs in recent years, including the Stade Mustapha Tchaker that also located at Blida. Other international matches were also played at the Stade 19 Mai 1956 of Annaba at Stade 20 Août 1955 and Stade Akid Lotfi of Tlemcen, and the Stade Mohamed Hamlaoui of Constantine.

The team of Algeria historically plays Stade 20 Août 1955 to Algiers which hosted the first international match of Algeria on its soil the 6 January 1963 deal with the selection of Bulgaria, match won with a score of two goals to one. Other historic sites that have hosted regular international home games of the Algeria are Stade 5 Juillet 1962 of Algiers but also Stade Mustapha Tchaker of Blida or also to the Stade Ahmed Zabana of Oran.

Algeria is sometimes relocates its friendly matches in Europe, Algeria has played many games at "home" in recent years France and Switzerland due to the fact that there is a large community expatriates in western Europe and much of the players play in European leagues.

=== Future for the Algerians Program ===
Stadiums in Algeria
Stade du 5 Juillet
Capacity: 64,000

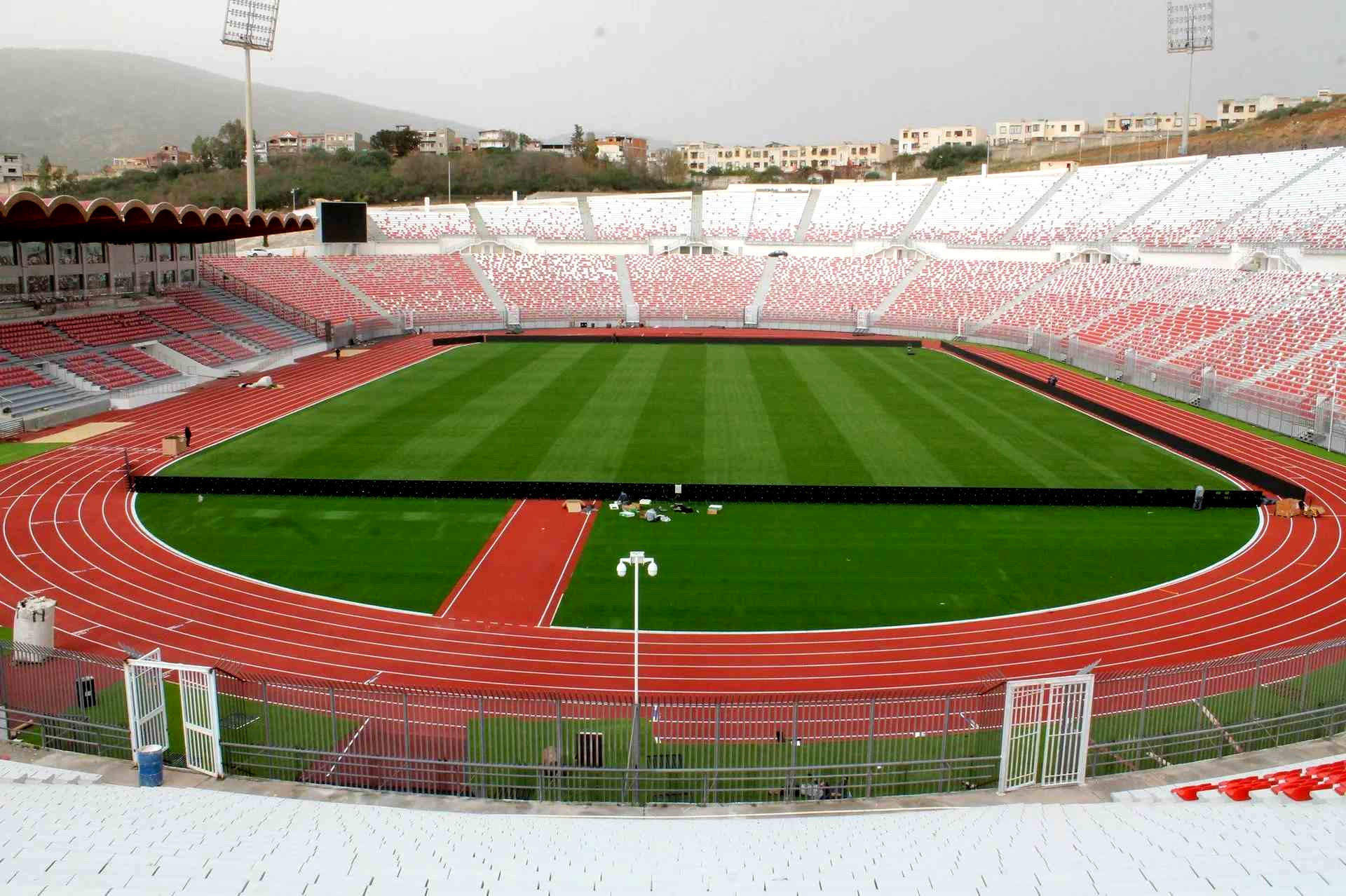
19 May 1956 Stadium
Capacity: 58,000

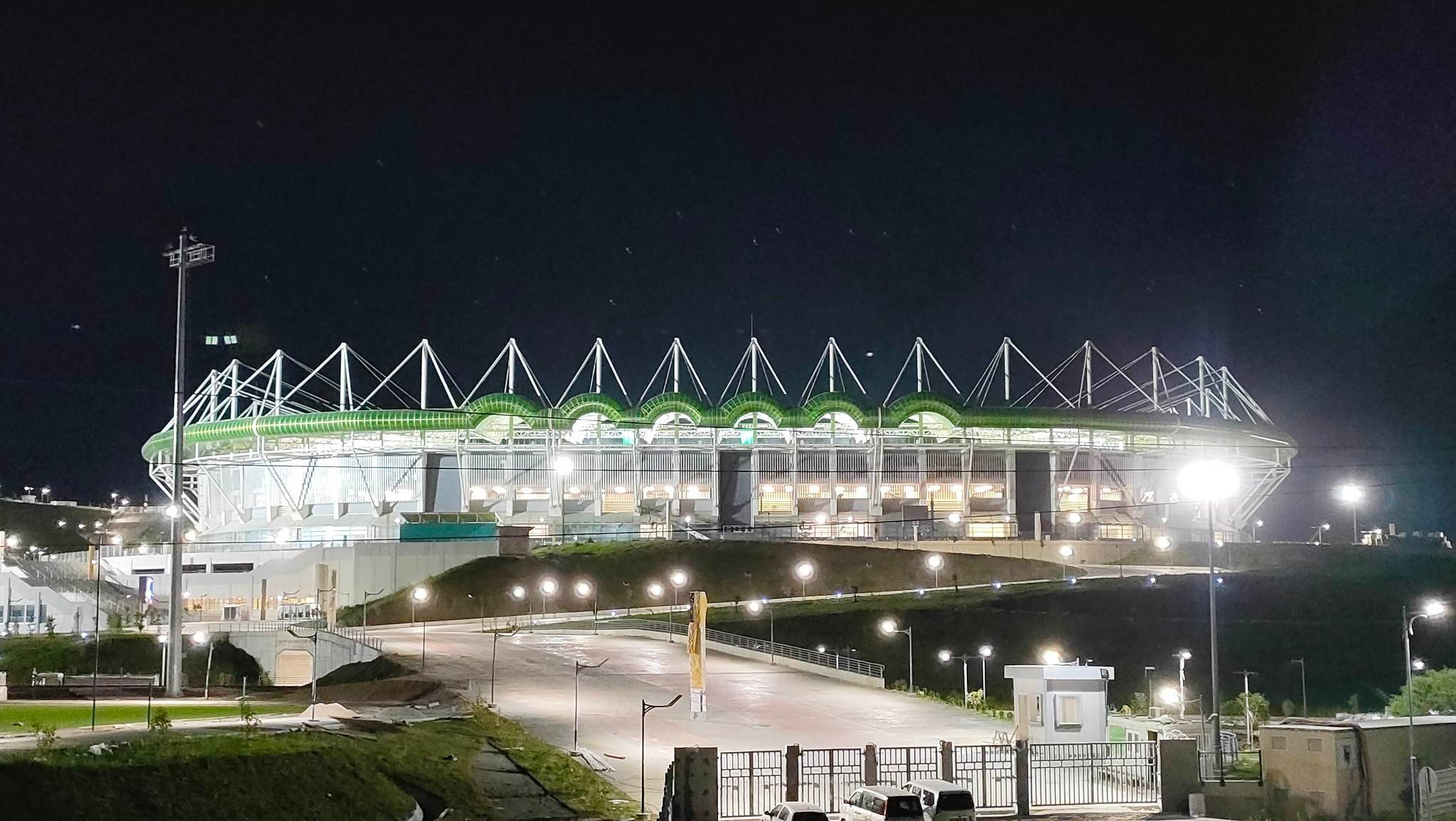
Hocine Aït Ahmed Stadium
Capacity: 50,000

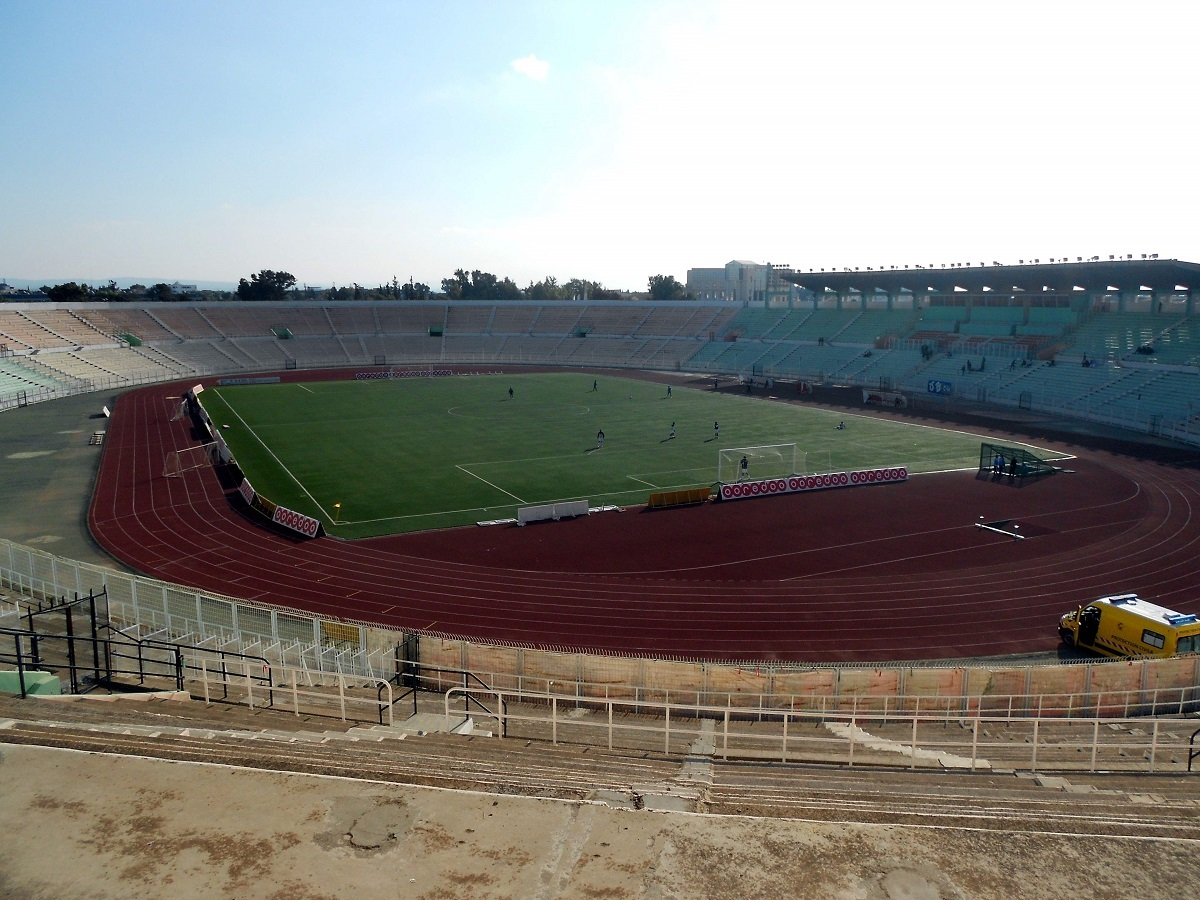
24 February 1956 Stadium
Capacity: 45,000

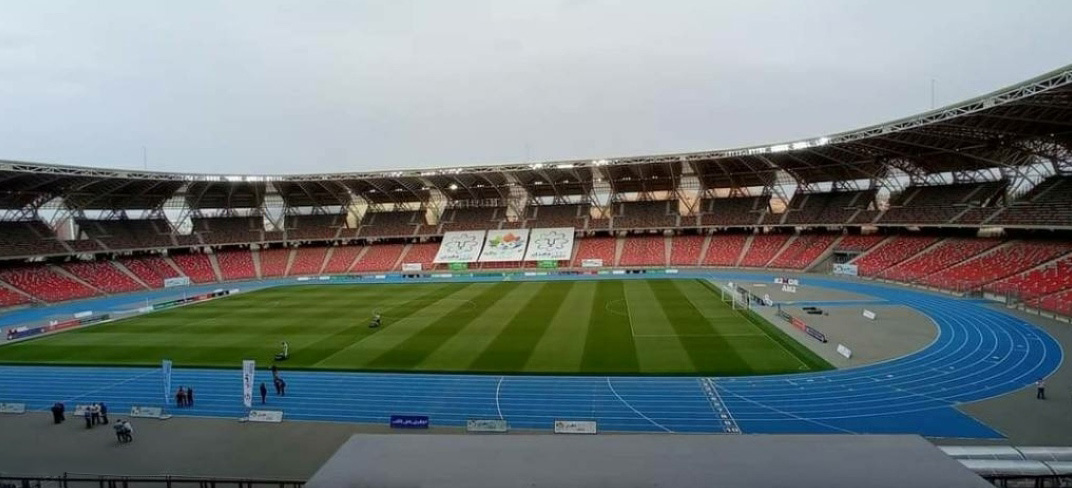
Miloud Hadefi Stadium
Capacity: 40,143
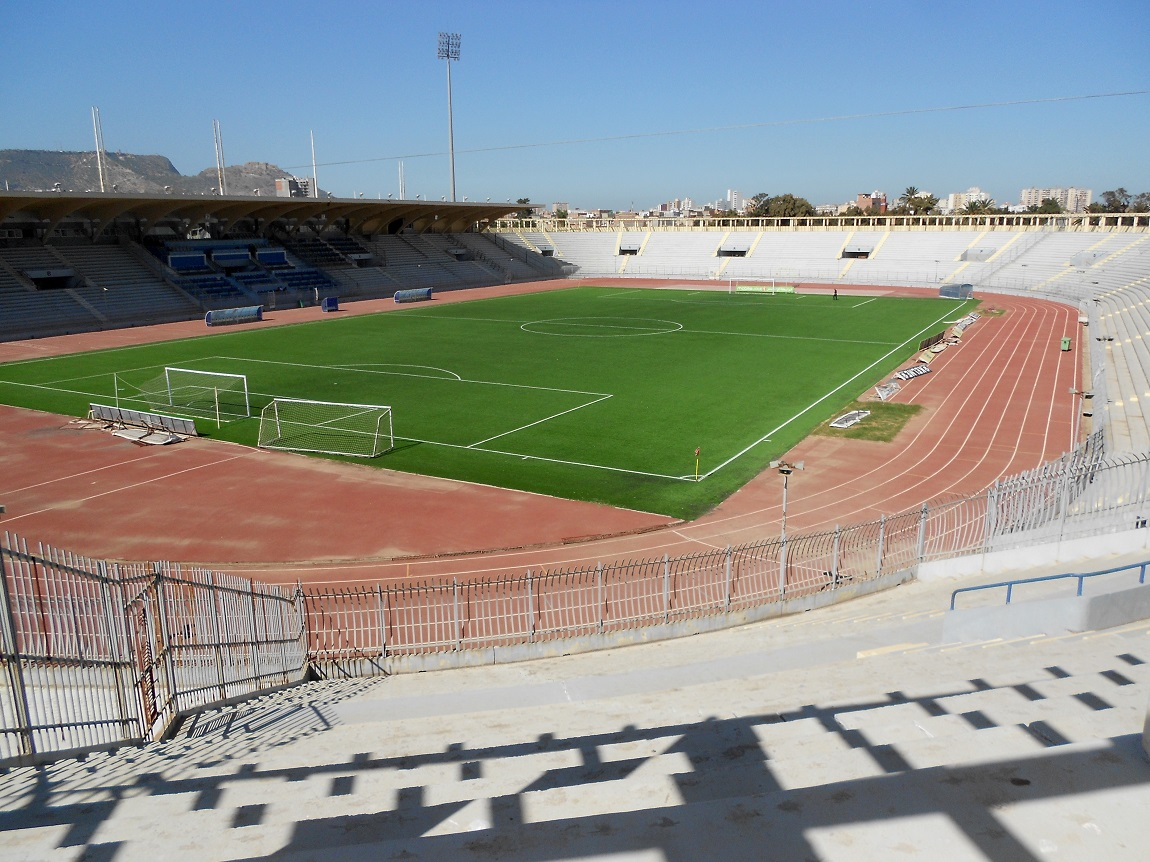
Ahmed Zabana Stadium
Capacity: 40,000

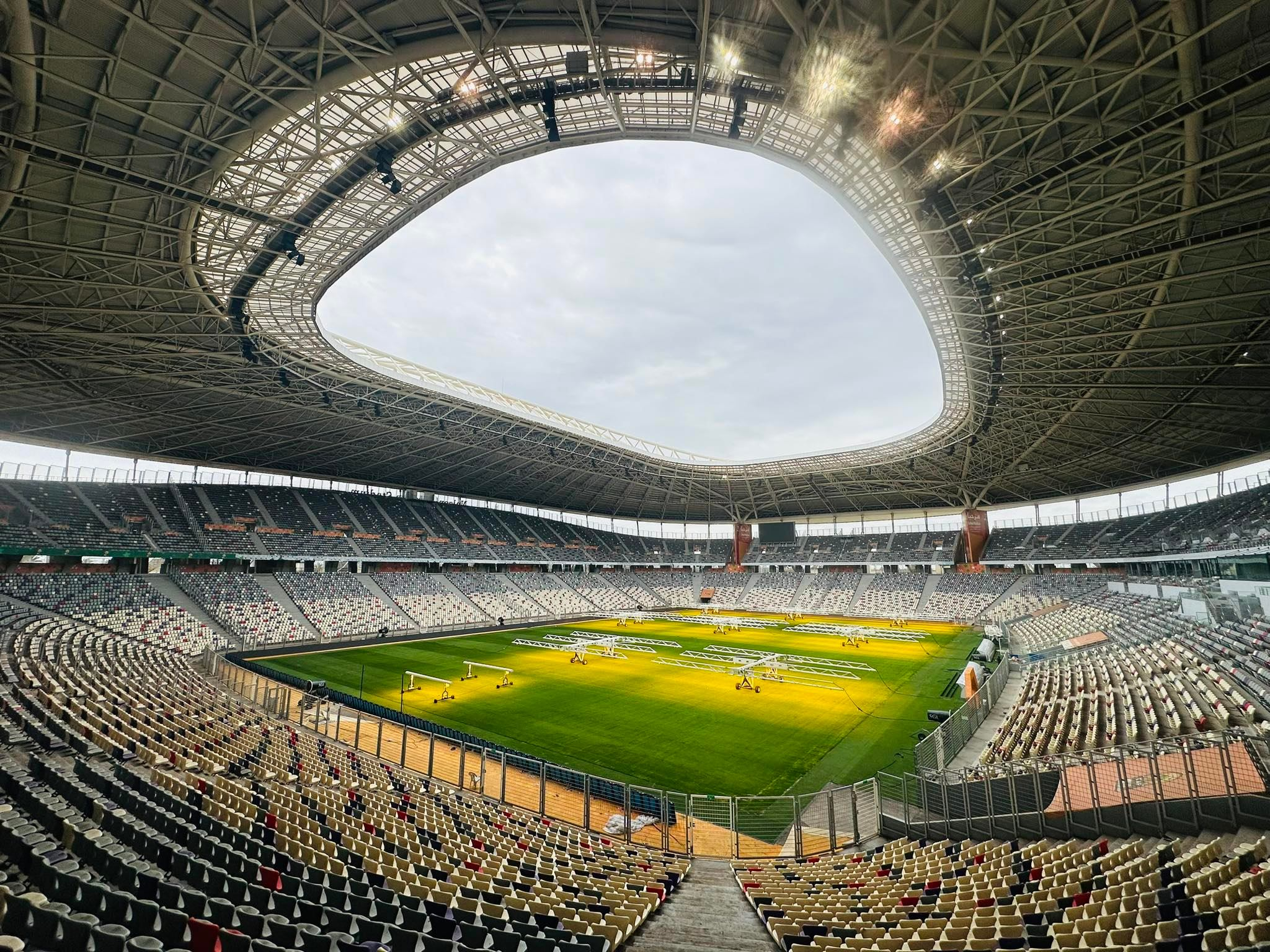
Nelson Mandela Stadium
Capacity: 40,000

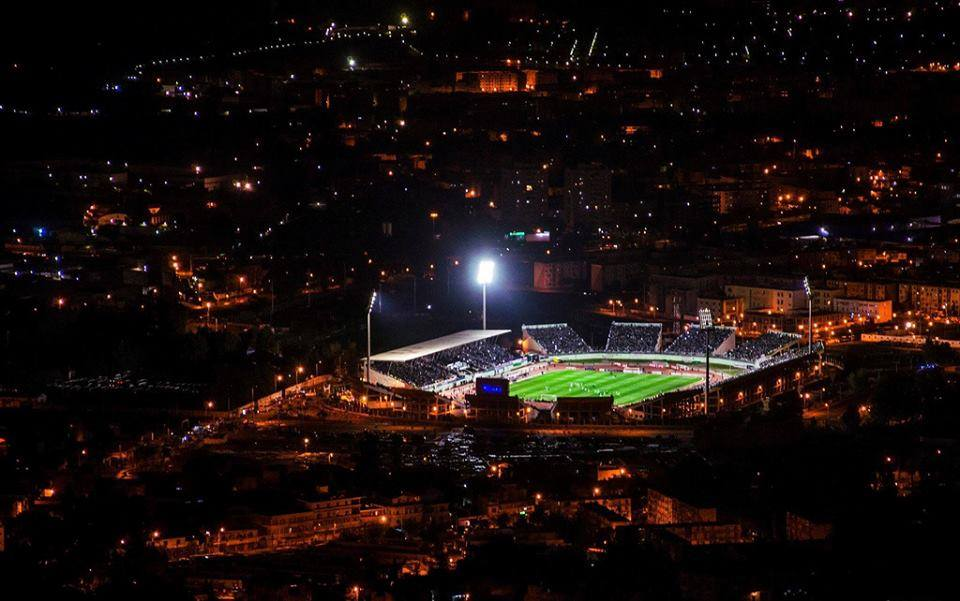
Mustapha Tchaker Stadium
Capacity: 25,000

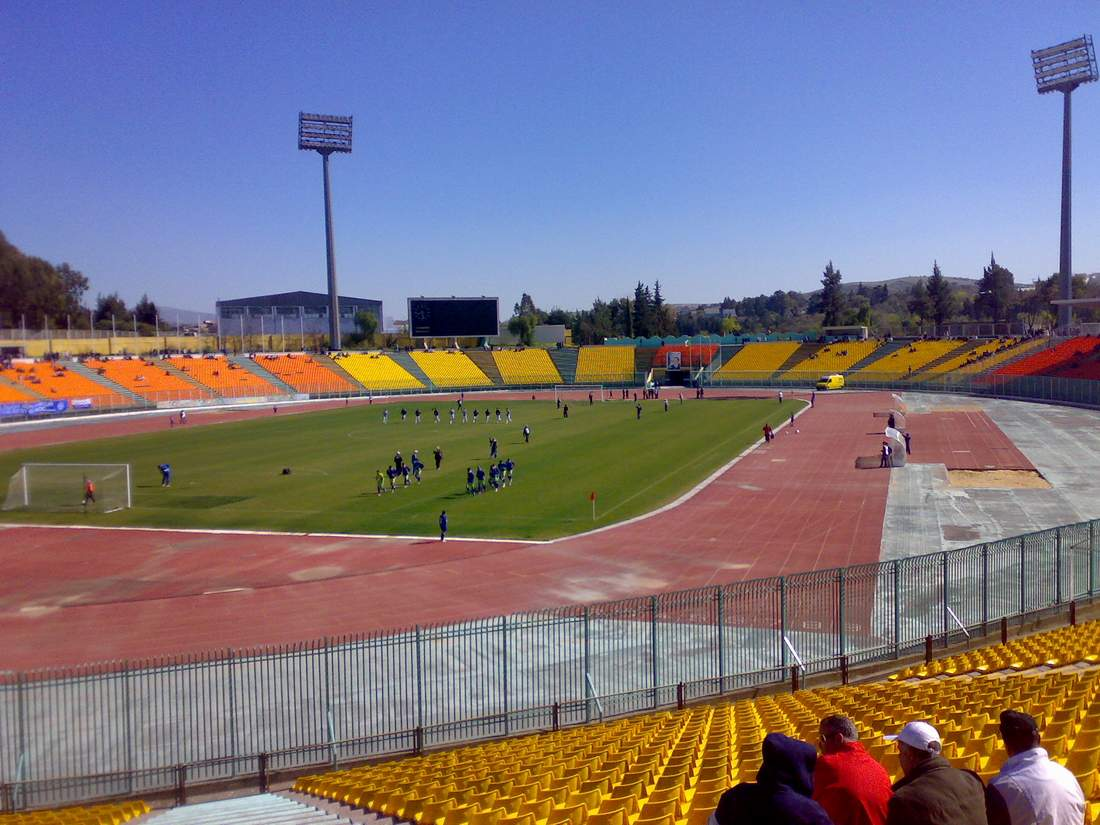
Mohamed Hamlaoui Stadium
Capacity: 22,986

† For closed or demolished grounds, capacity is taken at closure.
‡ Currently in the process of, or scheduled to be developed.

== List of Algeria national team Games by stadiums in Algeria ==
As of 9 October 2025

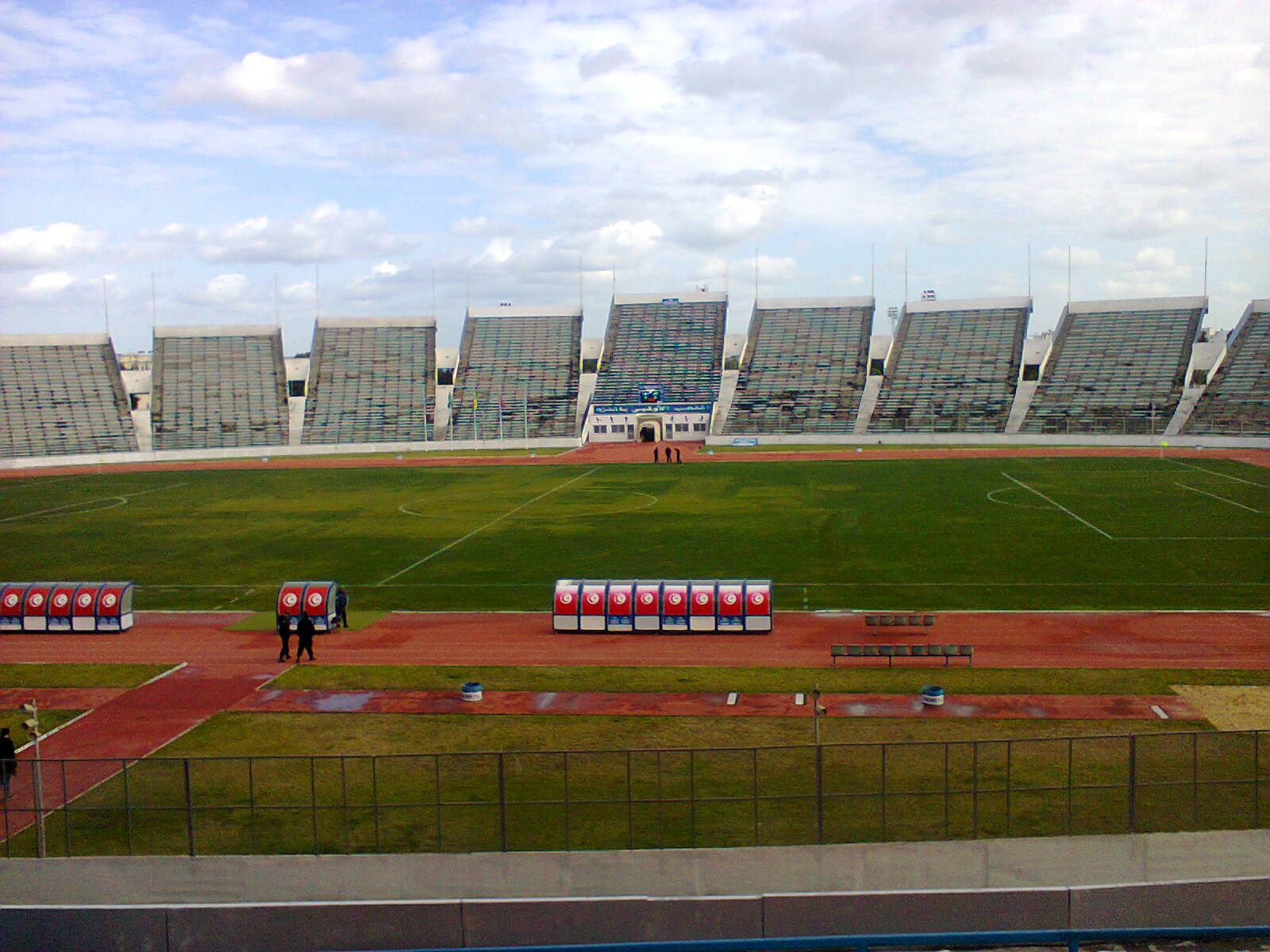
Algeria played 17 games at the Stade El Menzah more than any other stadium except Algerian stadiums.

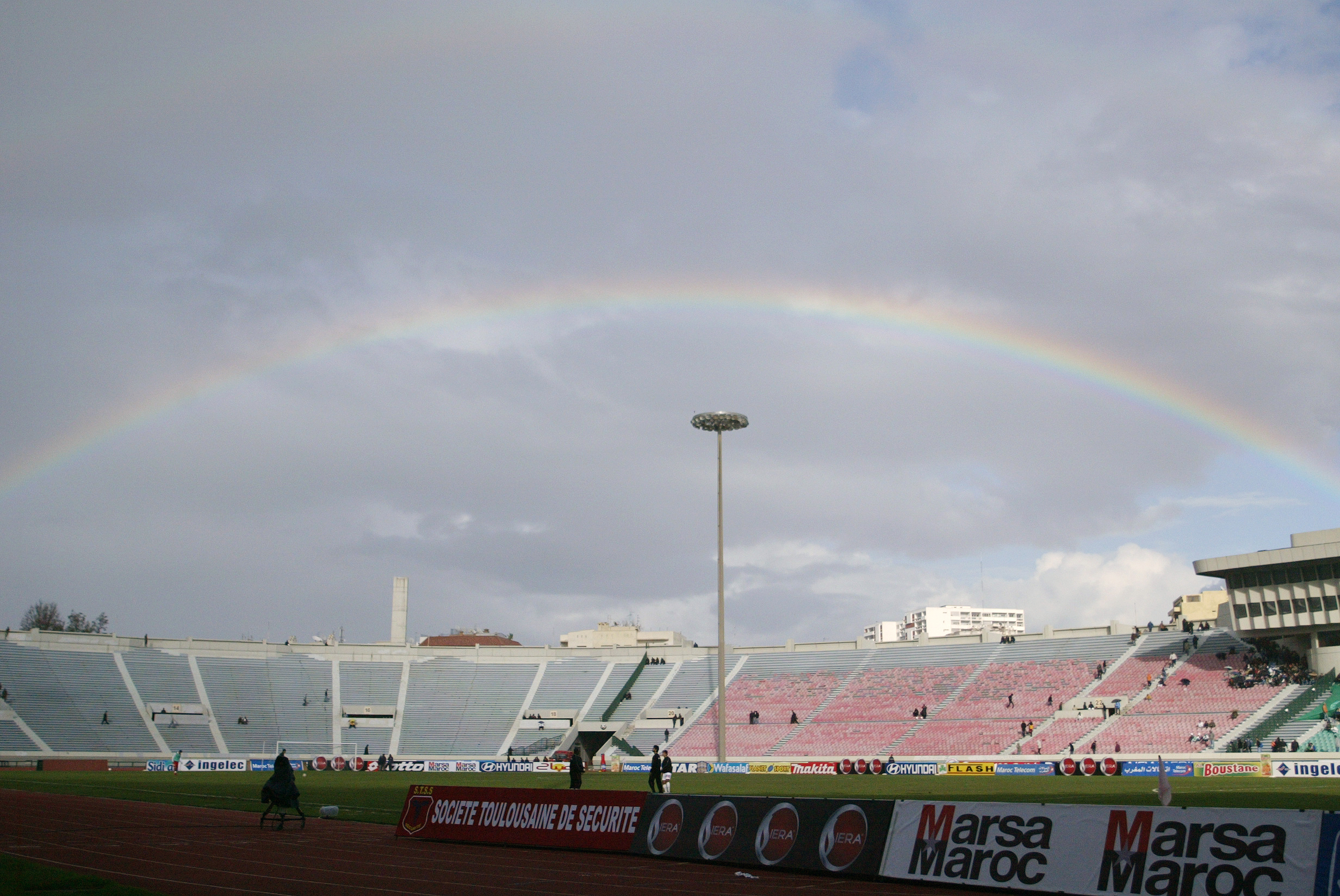
Algeria played 13 games at the Stade Mohamed V.

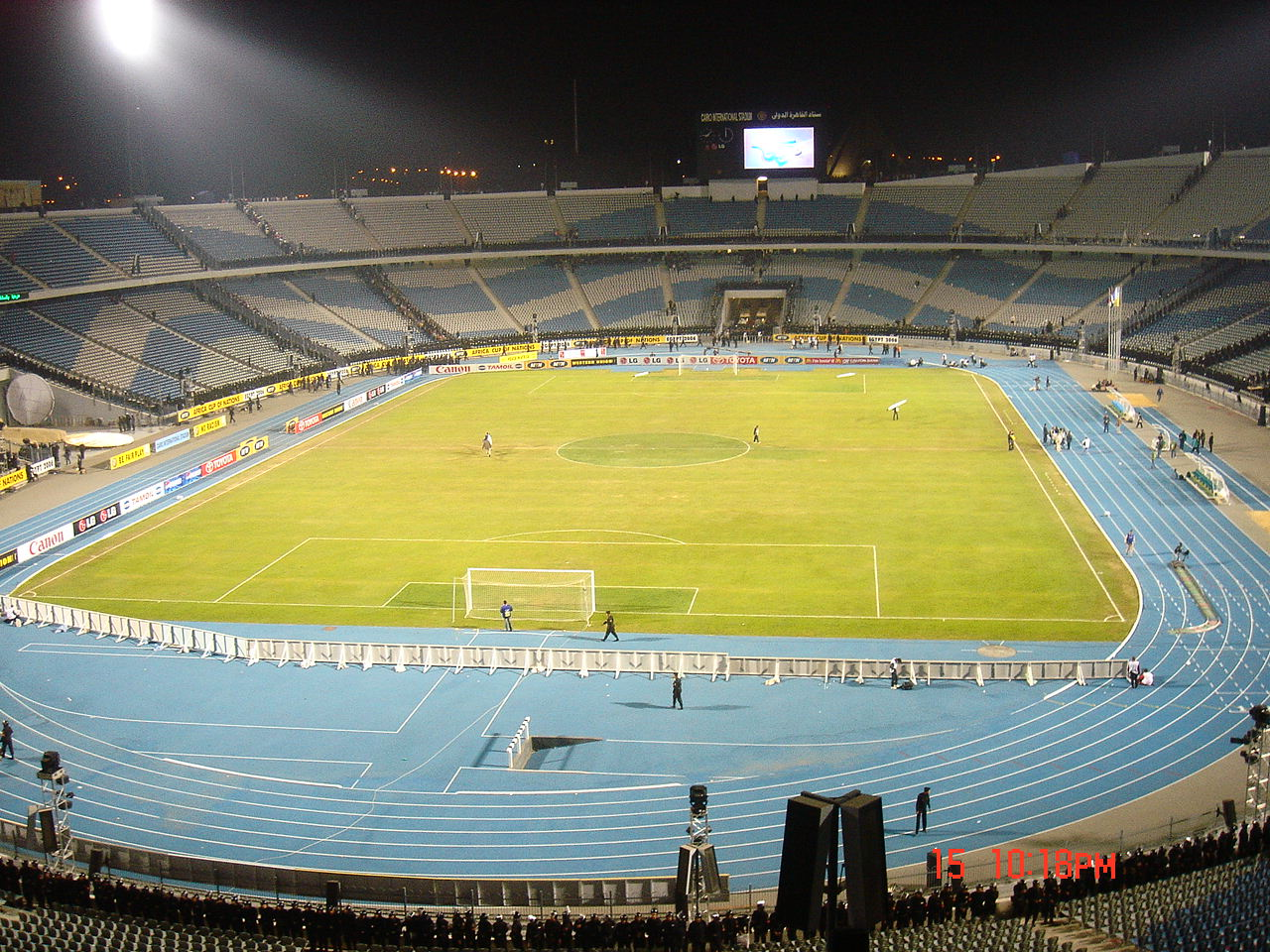
Algeria played 8 games at the Cairo International Stadium.

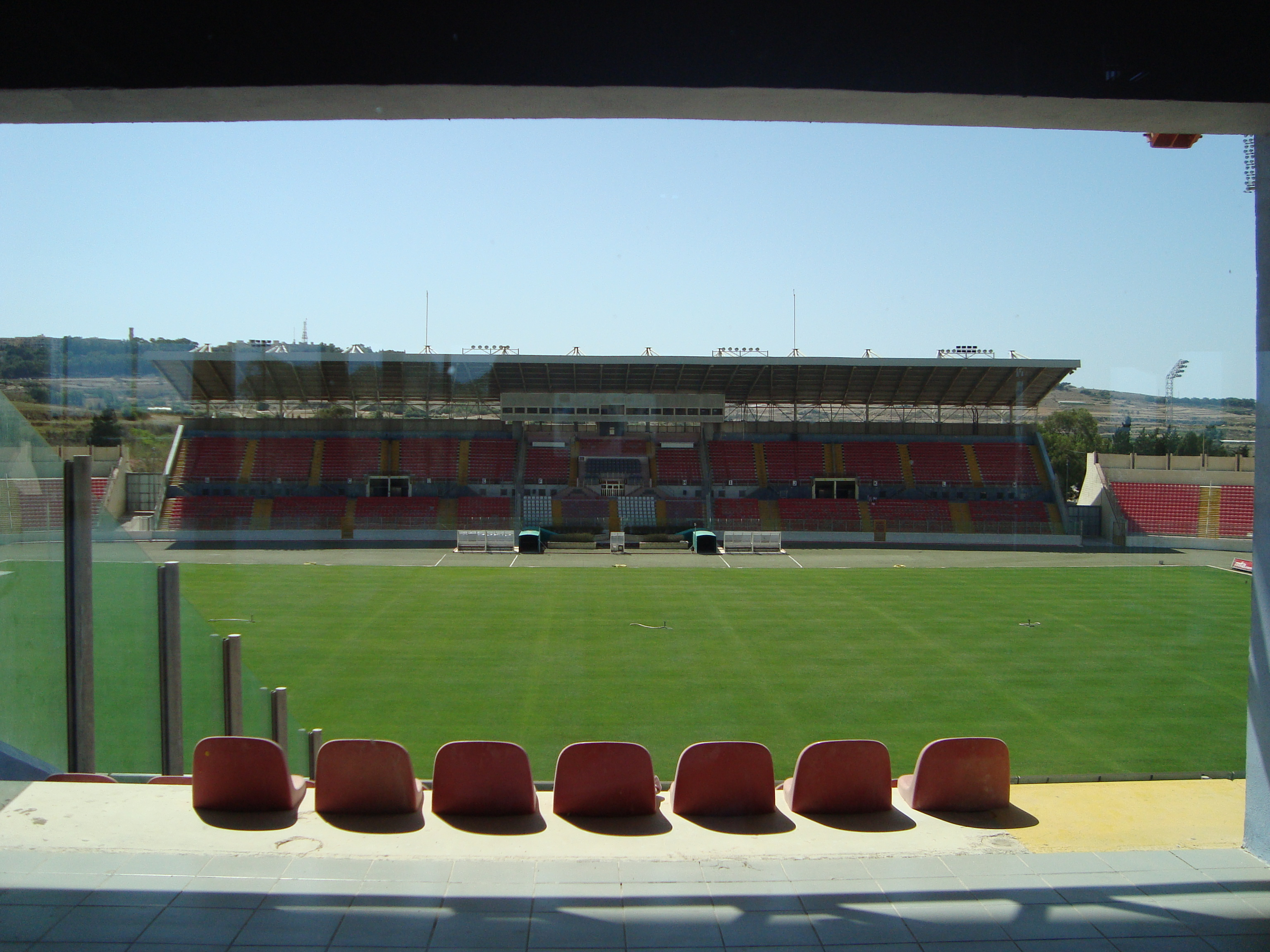
Ta' Qali National Stadium The most stadium in Europe, where the Algerian team played 3 games.

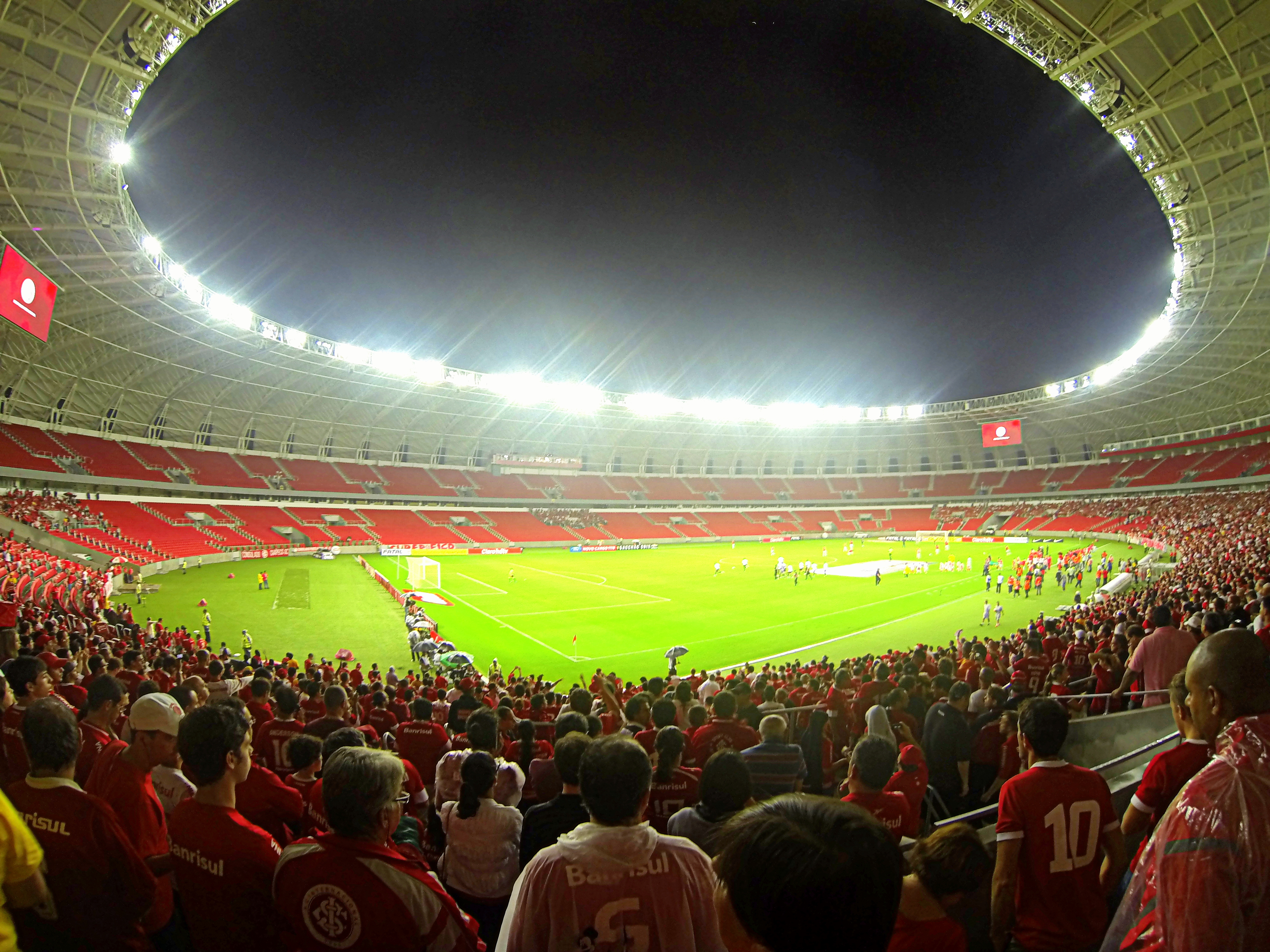
at Estádio José Pinheiro Borda Algeria became First African team to score four goals in one game against South Korea in World Cup.

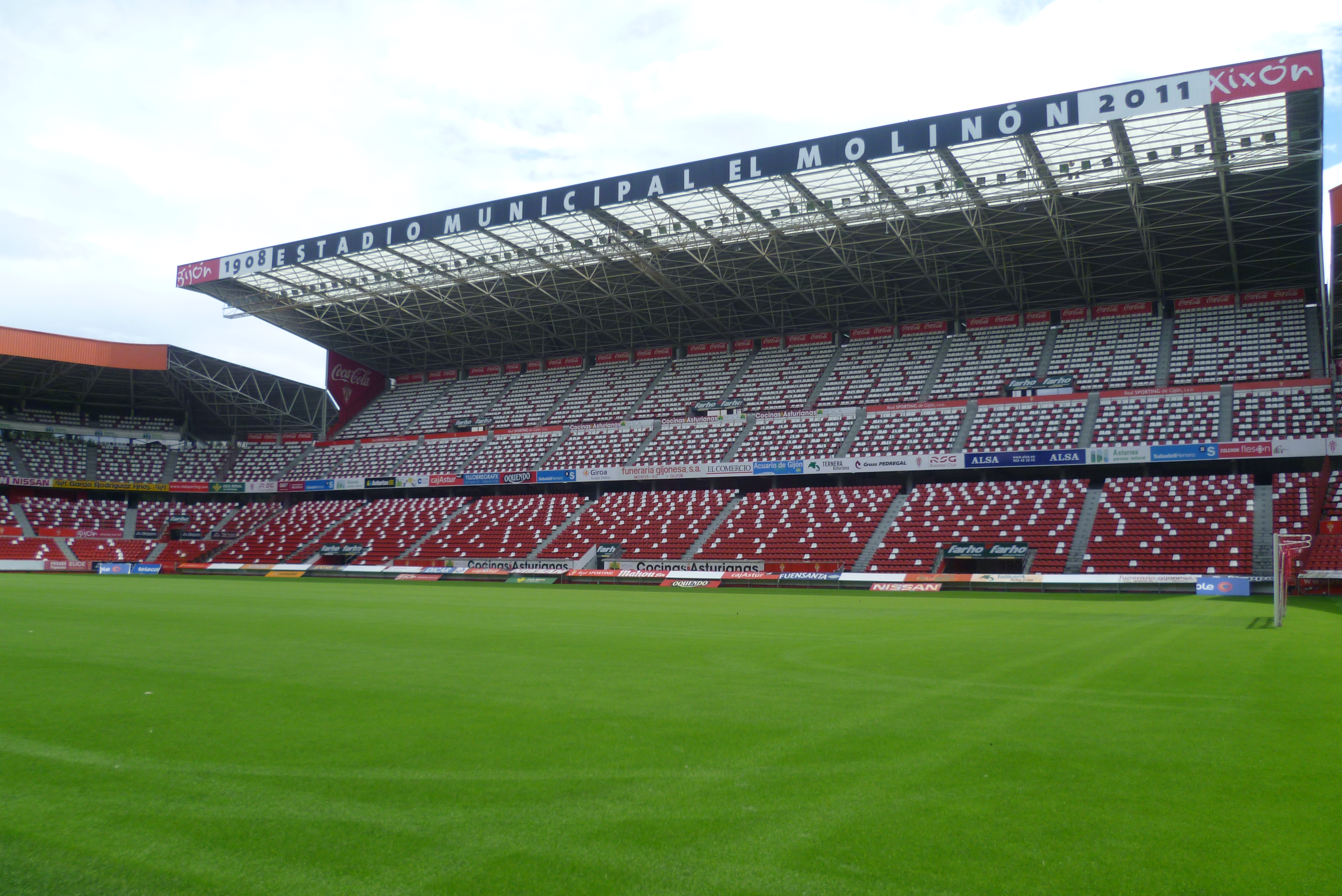
El Molinón hosted a game between Algeria against West Germany in 1982 FIFA World Cup and thanks to a 2–1 win over the reigning European champions, became the first African team to beat a European team in World Cup.

#	City	Stadium	Match	Date of debut	Debut against	Date of last match	Final match against
1	Algiers	(Algeria) Stade du 5 Juillet	120	4 Oct 1972	Turkey	12 Nov 2020	Zimbabwe
2	Blida	(Algeria) Mustapha Tchaker Stadium	45	20 Aug 2002	DR Congo	29 Mar 2022	Cameroon
3	Oran	(Algeria) Ahmed Zabana Stadium	29	26 Feb 1963	Czechoslovakia	4 Sep 2005	Nigeria
4	Algiers	(Algeria) 20 August 1955 Stadium	23	6 Jan 1963	Bulgaria	15 Mar 1972	Malta
4	Annaba	(Algeria) 19 May 1956 Stadium	23	10 Jul 1987	Sudan	10 Oct 2024	Togo
6	Constantine	(Algeria) Mohamed Hamlaoui Stadium	12	17 Nov 1978	Congo	5 Jun 2025	Rwanda
7	Tlemcen	(Algeria) Colonel Lotfi Stadium	6	28 Jul 1989	Qatar	16 Apr 1993	Ivory Coast
8	Oran	(Algeria) Miloud Hadefi Stadium	5	23 Sep 2022	Guinea	9 Oct 2025	Somalia
8	Algiers	(Algeria) Nelson Mandela Stadium	5	23 Mar 2023	Niger	6 Jun 2024	Guinea
10	Tizi Ouzou	(Algeria) Hocine Aït Ahmed Stadium	4	17 Nov 2024	Liberia	14 Oct 2025	Mozambique
11	Mascara	(Algeria) The African Unity Stadium	3	11 Dec 1986	Ivory Coast	29 Oct 1988	Angola
12	Constantine	(Algeria) Ramadane Ben Abdelmalek Stadium	1	1 Nov 1964	Soviet Union	1 Nov 1964	Soviet Union
12	Oran	(Algeria) Habib Bouakeul Stadium	1	3 May 1974	(England) Sheffield United	3 May 1974	(England) Sheffield United
12	Batna	(Algeria) 1 November 1954 Stadium	1	13 Mar 1985	East Germany	13 Mar 1985	East Germany
12	Sidi Bel Abbès	(Algeria) 24 February Stadium	1	22 Jan 1986	(Netherlands) PSV Eindhoven	22 Jan 1986	(Netherlands) PSV Eindhoven
12	Tiaret	(Algeria) Ahmed Kaïd Stadium	1	24 Feb 1987	(France) FC Nantes	24 Feb 1987	(France) FC Nantes
12	Relizane	(Algeria) Tahar Zoughari Stadium	1	18 Mar 1987	(France) O. Marseille	18 Mar 1987	(France) O. Marseille
12	Mascara	(Algeria) Aoued Meflah Stadium	1	29 Oct 1988	Angola	29 Oct 1988	Angola
12	Béjaïa	(Algeria) Maghrebi Unity Stadium	1	22 Mar 1989	Morocco	22 Mar 1989	Morocco
12	Mostaganem	(Algeria) Mohamed Bensaïd Stadium	1	25 Jan 1990	(France) Montpellier HSC	25 Jan 1990	(France) Montpellier HSC

† For closed or demolished grounds, capacity is taken at closure.
‡ Currently in the process of, or scheduled to be developed.

== List of Algeria national team Games by stadiums ==
List of Algerian national football team Games by stadiums with 4 or more matches
#	Stadium	Match	Date of debut	Debut against	Date of last match	Final match against
1	(Tunisia) El Menzah Stadium	17	29 Dec 1968	Tunisia	6 Jun 1999	Tunisia
2	(Morocco) Stade Mohammed V ‡	13	6 Mar 1966	Morocco	9 Sep 2012	Libya
3	(Libya) Benghazi International Stadium	9	13 Aug 1973	United Arab Emirates	16 Mar 1982	Ghana
4	(Iraq) Al-Shaab Stadium ‡	8	1 Jan 1972	Palestine	23 Feb 1978	Iraq
5	(Egypt) Cairo International Stadium	8	20 Mar 1964	Egypt	14 Nov 2009	Egypt
6	(Libya) Tripoli International Stadium	7	25 Aug 1973	Iraq	31 Jul 1998	Libya
7	(Nigeria) National Stadium, Lagos †	6	6 Jan 1973	Tanzania	3 Jul 1993	Nigeria
8	(Ethiopia) Addis Abeba Stadium	6	12 Jan 1968	Ivory Coast	29 Mar 2016	Ethiopia
9	(Ivory Coast) Felix Houphouet Boigny Stadium	6	17 Mar 1984	Egypt	18 Jul 1993	Ivory Coast
10	(Mali) Stade Modibo Kéïta	6	5 Feb 1967	Mali	25 Jan 1997	Mali
11	(Republic of the Congo) Stade Alphonse Massemba-Débat	5	18 Jul 1965	Ivory Coast	25 Jul 1965	Ivory Coast
12	(Ivory Coast) Stade de la Paix	5	5 Mar 1984	Malawi	22 Jun 1997	Ivory Coast
13	(Nigeria) Obafemi Awolowo Stadium	4	9 Mar 1980	Ghana	19 Mar 1980	Egypt
14	(Egypt) Alexandria Stadium	4	22 Mar 1964	Egypt	14 Mar 1986	Cameroon
15	(Jordan) Amman International Stadium	4	8 Jul 1988	Syria	14 Jul 1988	Jordan
16	(Tunisia) Chedly Zouiten Stadium	4	15 Dec 1963	Tunisia	28 Jun 2000	Tunisia
17	(Senegal) Stade Léopold Sédar Senghor	4	10 Jan 1993	Senegal	31 May 2008	Senegal
18	(Burkina Faso) Stade du 4 Août	4	11 Feb 1998	Guinea	12 Oct 2013	Burkina Faso
19	(Mali) Stade du 26 Mars	4	21 Jan 2002	Nigeria	19 Nov 2014	Mali
20	(Angola) Estádio da Cidadela	4	31 Mar 1985	Angola	5 Jun 2005	Angola

† For closed or demolished grounds, capacity is taken at closure.
‡ Currently in the process of, or scheduled to be developed.

== List of Algeria national team Games by stadiums in African Cup ==
List of Algerian national football team Games by stadiums in African Cup with 2 or more matches
#	Stadium	Match	Date of debut	Debut against	Date of last match	Final match against
1	(Algeria) Stade du 5 Juillet ‡	5	2 Mar 1990	Nigeria	16 Mar 1990	Nigeria
2	(Nigeria) Obafemi Awolowo Stadium	4	9 Mar 1980	Ghana	19 Mar 1980	Egypt
3	(Libya) Benghazi International Stadium	4	7 Mar 1982	Zambia	16 Mar 1982	Ghana
4	(Morocco) Stade Mohamed V ‡	4	13 Mar 1988	Ivory Coast	26 Mar 1988	Morocco
5	(Gabon) Stade de Franceville	3	15 Jan 2017	Zimbabwe	23 Jan 2017	Senegal
6	(Ivory Coast) Stade de la Paix	3	5 Mar 1984	Malawi	11 Mar 1984	Nigeria
7	(Ethiopia) Addis Abeba Stadium	3	12 Jan 1968	Ivory Coast	16 Jan 1968	Ethiopia
8	(Egypt) Alexandria Stadium	3	8 Mar 1986	Morocco	14 Mar 1986	Cameroon
9	(Ghana) Kumasi Sports Stadium	3	24 Jan 2000	DR Congo	2 Feb 2000	South Africa
10	(Mali) Stade du 26 Mars	3	21 Jan 2002	Nigeria	28 Jan 2002	Mali
11	(Tunisia) Sousse Olympic Stadium	3	25 Jan 2004	Cameroon	3 Feb 2004	Zimbabwe
12	(Angola) Estádio 11 de Novembro	3	11 Jan 2010	Malawi	18 Jan 2010	Mali
13	(South Africa) Royal Bafokeng Stadium	3	22 Jan 2013	Tunisia	30 Jan 2013	Ivory Coast
14	(Angola) Estádio Nacional de Ombaka	2	28 Jan 2010	Egypt	30 Jan 2010	Nigeria
15	(Ivory Coast) Felix Houphouet Boigny Stadium	2	14 Mar 1984	Cameroon	17 Mar 1984	Egypt
16	(Senegal) Stade Aline Sitoe Diatta	2	13 Jan 1992	Ivory Coast	17 Jan 1992	Congo
17	(South Africa) Free State Stadium	2	14 Jan 1996	Zambia	18 Jan 1996	Sierra Leone
18	(Equatorial Guinea) Estadio de Mongomo	2	19 Jan 2015	South Africa	23 Jan 2015	Ghana
19	(Equatorial Guinea) Estadio de Malabo	2	27 Jan 2015	Senegal	1 Feb 2015	Ivory Coast
20	(Burkina Faso) Stade Municipal	2	8 Feb 1998	Guinea	15 Feb 1998	Cameroon

† For closed or demolished grounds, capacity is taken at closure.
‡ Currently in the process of, or scheduled to be developed.

== List of Algeria national team Games by stadiums in World Cup ==
#	Stadium	Match	Date of debut	Debut against	Date of last match	Final match against
1	(Spain) Estadio Carlos Tartiere †	2	21 Jun 1982	Austria	24 Jun 1982	Chile
2	(Brazil) Estádio Beira-Rio	2	22 Jun 2014	South Korea	30 Jun 2014	Germany
3	(Spain) El Molinón	1	16 Jun 1982	Germany	16 Jun 1982	Germany
4	(Mexico) Estadio Jalisco	1	6 Jun 1986	Brazil	6 Jun 1986	Brazil
5	(Mexico) Estadio Tres de Marzo	1	3 Jun 1986	Northern Ireland	3 Jun 1986	Northern Ireland
6	(Mexico) Estadio Tecnológico	1	12 Jun 1986	Spain	12 Jun 1986	Spain
7	(South Africa) Peter Mokaba Stadium	1	13 Jun 2010	Slovenia	13 Jun 2010	Slovenia
8	(South Africa) Cape Town Stadium	1	18 Jun 2010	England	18 Jun 2010	England
9	(South Africa) Loftus Versfeld Stadium	1	23 Jun 2010	United States	23 Jun 2010	United States
10	(Brazil) Mineirão	1	17 Jun 2014	Belgium	17 Jun 2014	Belgium
11	(Brazil) Arena da Baixada	1	26 Jun 2014	Russia	26 Jun 2014	Russia
12	(United States) Arrowhead Stadium	1	16 Jun 2026	Argentina	27 Jun 2026	Austria

† For closed or demolished grounds, capacity is taken at closure.
‡ Currently in the process of, or scheduled to be developed.
