= Mouloud Zerrouki Stadium =

Sports venue in Algeria

- Interactive map of Mouloud Zerrouki Stadium
- Location: Les Eucalyptus, Algiers, Algeria
- Coordinates: 36°40′08.9″N 3°08′45″E
- Owner: Wilaya d'Alger
- Capacity: 5,500
- Field size: 105 by 68 metres (115 by 74 yd)

Construction
- Opened: 10 July 2025

Mouloud Zerrouki Stadium (Arabic: ملعب مولود زروقي) is a 5,500-capacity stadium in Les Eucalyptus, Algeria, a suburb of Algiers. Covering an area of 1,156 m², the complex includes: a main pitch, stands with a capacity of 5,500 spectators, two sports halls and three annex rooms, a press room and a VIP stand.

== History ==
=== Handover and opening ===
The delegated wali of the administrative district of Baraki, Abdelouahab Bertima, inaugurated on July 10, 2025, the new municipal stadium Mouloud Zerrouki in the commune of Les Eucalyptus. The facility now bears the name of martyr Mouloud Zerrouki, in tribute to his sacrifice and with the aim of promoting sports practice while creating new recreational spaces for young people. The inauguration ceremony featured sports demonstrations, gala matches bringing together young players and local teams, as well as tributes to several national sports figures: African and world champions, and Paralympic athletes with Down syndrome. The family of martyr Zerrouki was honored, along with the memory of several late athletes. The event was attended by several prominent figures, including the former Minister of Labor, the President of the FLN Foundation, members of parliament, and representatives of the security services and the press.

== See also ==
- List of football stadiums in Algeria
- List of African stadiums by capacity
- List of association football stadiums by capacity
