= National Institute of Post and Information and Communication Technologies =

INPTIC
- المعهد الوطني للبريد وتكنولوجيات الإعلام والاتصال
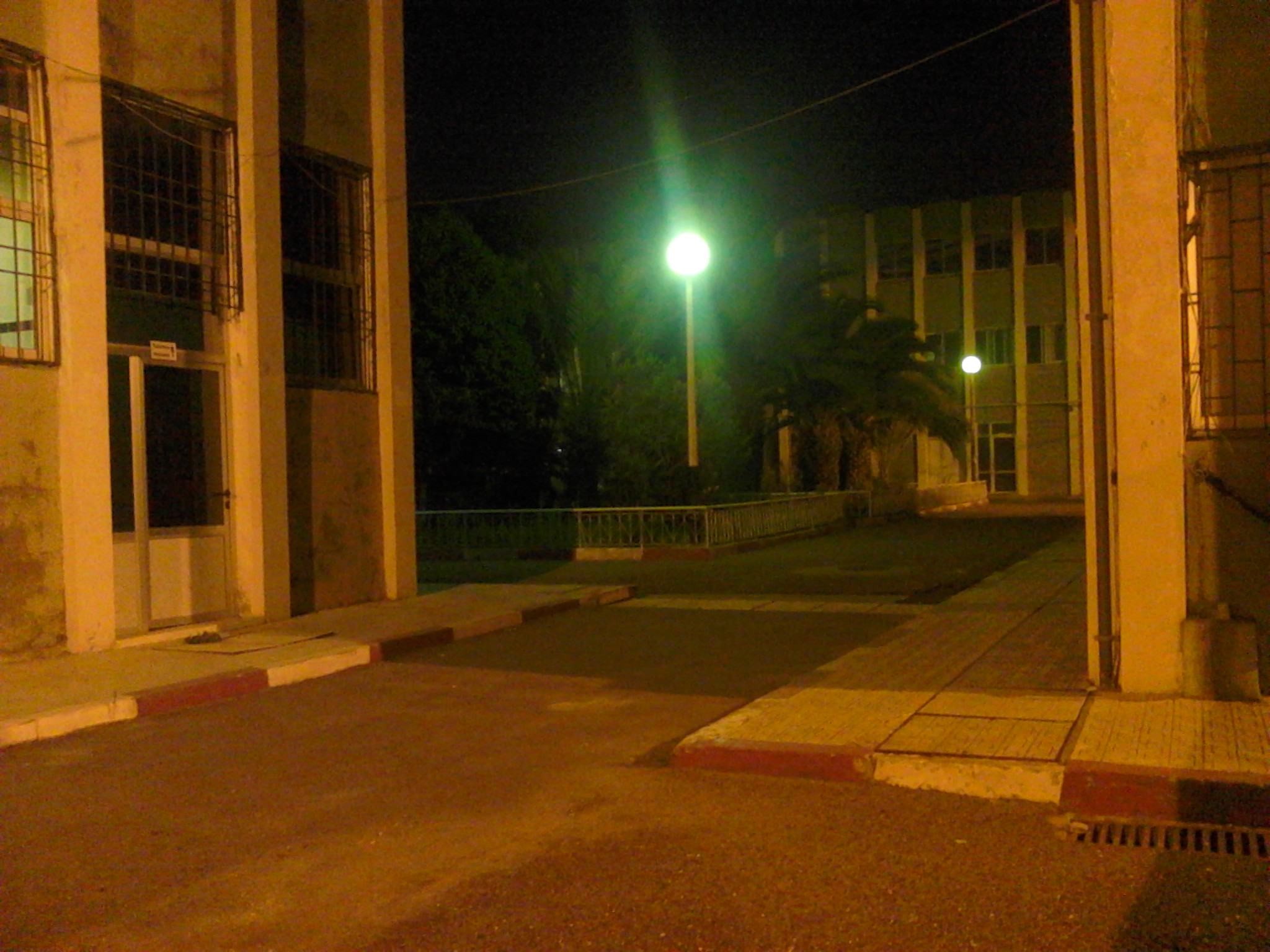
- INPTIC at night
- Type: Public university
- Established: 1982
- Students: ~ 250
- Location: Les Eucalyptus (Algiers Province), Algeria; 36°39′42″N 3°08′35″E
- Language: French
- Website: http://www.inptic.edu.dz

The National Institute of Post and Information and Communication Technologies (acronym: INPTIC) or Arabic: المعهد الوطني للبريد وتكنولوجيات الإعلام والاتصال is an Algerian university institution offering training in the fields of telecommunications engineering, computer networks, information technologies, and management. It also offers parallel training for Cisco and Oracle certifications and the European Computer Competence License. The institute is located in the town of Les Eucalyptus, east of Algiers. Administratively, it falls under the Ministry of Post and Information and Communication Technologies and the Ministry of Higher Education and Scientific Research. The institute is a member of the Agence universitaire de la Francophonie.

== Programs ==
INPTIC offers high-level, professional, and degree-awarding university programs that combine technological expertise with interactions between networks, services, and applications. These include:

=== Bachelor's Degrees (BAC+3) ===
- Telecommunications and Computer Networks (TRI)
- Communication Services and Networks (SRC)

=== Specialized Master's Degrees (Bac+5) ===
- ICT Management
- System and Network Security
