= August 20, 1955 Stadium =

August 20, 1955 Stadium, or Stade 20 Août 1955 in French, or ملعب 20 أوت 1955 in Arabic, may refer to the following stadiums in Algeria:

- August 20, 1955 Stadium (Algiers)
- August 20, 1955 Stadium (Béchar)
- August 20, 1955 Stadium (Bordj Bou Arréridj)
- August 20, 1955 Stadium (Skikda)
