= ES Souk Ahras =

Algerian football club

Entente sportive de Souk Ahras
- Full name: Entente sportive de Souk Ahras
- Nickname(s): l'Entente; Ouled Sidi Masoud; The Reds and Blacks
- Founded: November 1, 1957; 67 years ago as Entente sportive de Souk Ahras
- Ground: Mokhtar Badji Stadium
- Capacity: 15000
- League: Ligue Régional I
- 2023–24: Ligue Régional I, Annaba, 2nd
Home colours	Away colours	Third colours

Entente sportive de Souk Ahras (Arabic: الوفاق الرياضي سوق أهراس), known as ES Souk Ahras or simply ESSA for short, is a football club based in the city of Souk Ahras. The club was founded infounded on 1 November 1957 and its colours are red, black and white. Their home stadium, Mokhtar Badji Stadium, has a capacity of 15,000 spectators. The club is currently playing in the Ligue Régional I.

== History ==
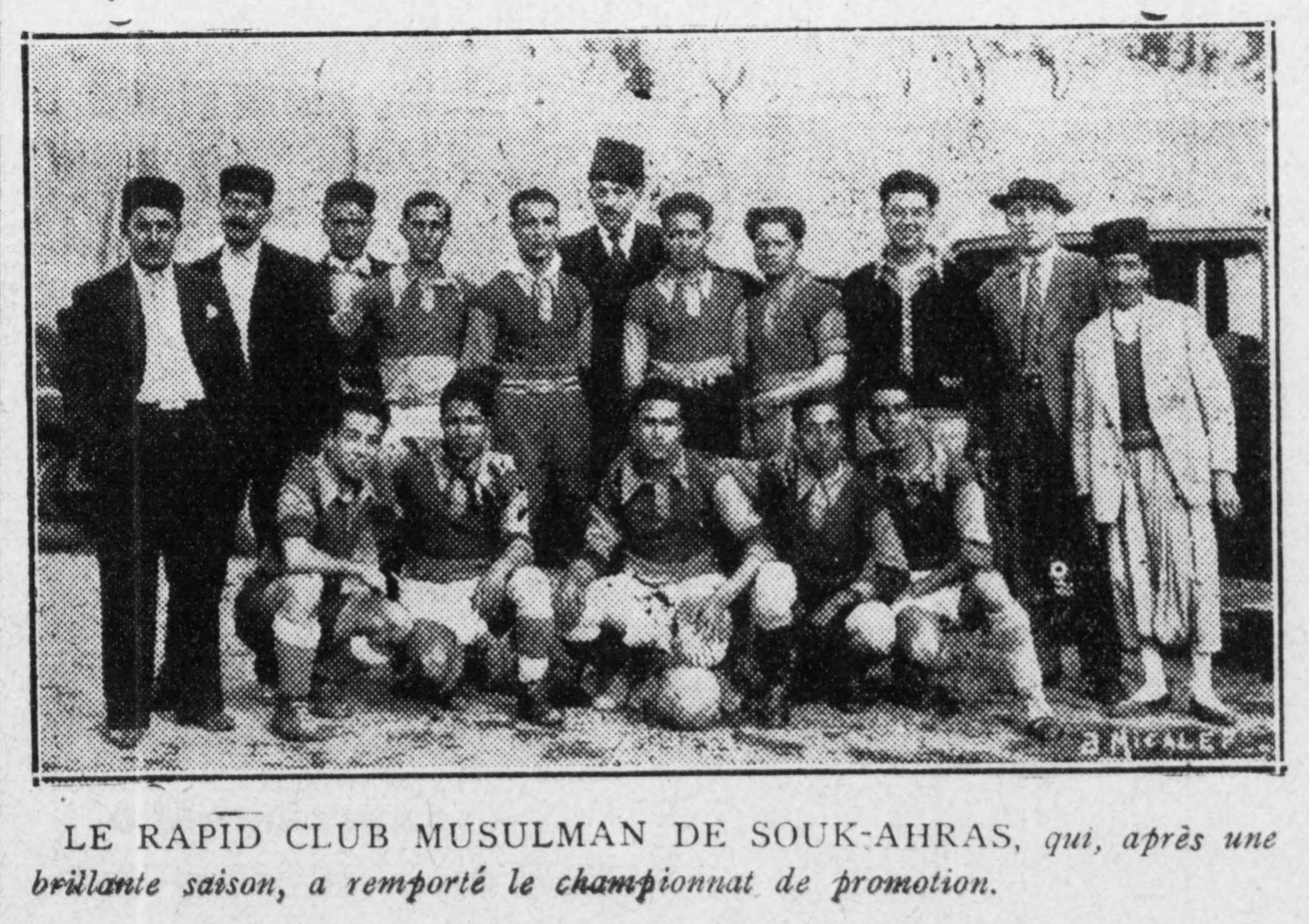
Rapid Muslim Club Souk Ahras in 1933

History of the club Entente Sportive of Souk-Ahras: The word agreement used during the French colonial in order to make hear between French and Arabs. The first official match against the team of Oum El Bouaghi whose agreement to win the match (2–0), was the beast of the club of the East of Algeria and is also called to this time the (Red Devil). At independence takes the name (Fanal Red). Created on 2 November 1957, he wears the flag of the city in several sports, including football, where he participates in the regional league of Annaba, and the football team of the 1970s when the (ESSA) evolved in 2nd division and gained Several game against big national clubs. This club is considered among the oldest club of Algeria and that spawned great players that participated in the national team. Example: Yacine SID.

- The different names of the club

1980 Rapid Town of Souk-Ahras (RCSA)

== Colours and badge ==
For the red color, it is a flame that is the heart of the players and the blood of the martyr and the eternal love of the club. The black is the color symbolizes power. Lion of Barbary symbol of the city.

== Stadium ==
Badji Mokhtar of Souk Ahras, Mokhtar Badji Stadium can accommodate 15,000 spectators with natural grass lawn, it has an athletics tartan track Annexes likely to host high level competitions.

== Supporters and rivalries ==
The club ESSA is the most popular club in Souk Ahras, its supporters are called lions, literally in Arabic Algeria (السبوعة), in reference to their number. Among the fan groups of the club, the Ultras (Red Lion), he is the first group of Ultras in Souk Ahras.
