= Mokhtar Badji Stadium =

Mokhtar Badji Stadium ملعب مختار باجي
- Interactive map of Mokhtar Badji Stadium ملعب مختار باجي
- Full name: Mokhtar Badji Stadium
- Location: Route Draia Hmed Souk Ahras, Algeria
- Coordinates: 21.33053°N 0.95943°E
- Owner: Ministry of Youth and Sport
- Operator: APC of Souk Ahras
- Capacity: 15,000
- Surface: Grass grandstands Green, red and white for high and blue stands, a little gray on some seats and white for the low stands

Construction
- Opened: 17 June 1985

Tenant
- ES Souk Ahras

Mokhtar Badji Stadium (Arabic: ملعب مختار باجي) is a multi-purpose stadium in Souk Ahras, Algeria. It is currently used mostly for football matches. The stadium has a capacity of 15,000 people.
