= 20 August 1955 Stadium (Skikda) =

Sports venue in Algeria

Coordinates: 31.6056°N 2.2183°W

- 20 Août
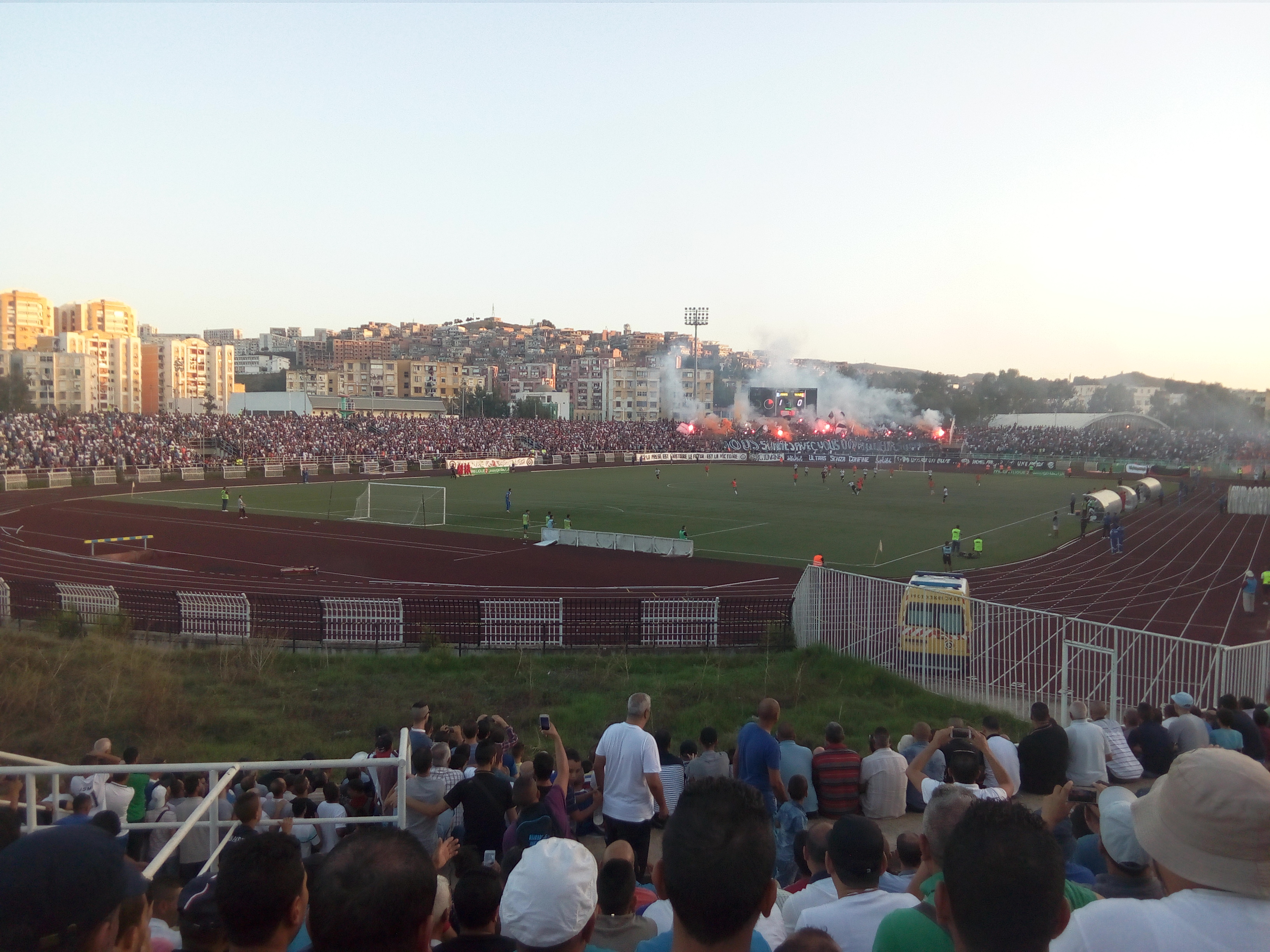
- Interactive map of 20 August 1955 Stadium
- Full name: Stade du 20 Août 1955
- Location: Skikda, Algeria
- Owner: APC of Skikda
- Capacity: 30,000
- Surface: Artificial turf

Tenant
- JSM Skikda

20 August 1955 Stadium (Arabic: ملعب 20 أوت 1955), is a multi-use stadium in Skikda, Algeria. It is currently used mostly for football matches. The stadium holds 30,000 people. It serves as a home ground for JSM Skikda.

== See also ==
- List of football stadiums in Algeria
- List of African stadiums by capacity
- List of association football stadiums by capacity
