= New Sétif Stadium =

New Sétif Stadium (proposed named)
- Interactive map of New Sétif Stadium (proposed named)
- Location: Ouled Sabor, Sétif, Algeria
- Coordinates: 36°10′13.3″N 5°30′48.5″E
- Owner: Ministry of Youth and Sport
- Operator: Ministry of Youth and Sport
- Capacity: 50,000
- Surface: Grass

Construction
- Groundbreaking: TBD
- Opened: TBD
- Cost: 30 Billion DA
- Builders: (Algeria) Cosider (Spain) Sacyr

Tenant
- ES Sétif

New Sétif Stadium is a 50,000-seat stadium planned in Sétif, Algeria. Construction is currently suspended.

== Construction ==
The new stadium, in Ain Romane on the outskirts of Setif, will meet the "standards" of FIFA for its measurements, lighting, safety, and media. With amenities including a conference room and parking for 6,000 cars, it will cover 75 hectares. The future stronghold of Black and White will include an Olympic swimming pool, an equestrian center, an athletic stadium with bleachers for 3,000, three replicas courses, a 4-star hotel with 200 beds, a restaurant with 400 seats, a 400-seat auditorium, and a media area. It is expected to itself create hundreds of jobs for the area in tandem with a future industrial mega-area of 700 hectares. According to local officials, the stadium was to be delivered in 36 months. Construction was contracted to the public company Cosider and the Spanish company Sacyr at a cost of almost 30 billion dinars.

On 28 January 2021, The Minister of Youth and Sports, Sid Ali Khaldi declared that the project of the Olympic sports complex of Sétif frozen since 2015 will be relaunched as soon as the conditions are met, The Minister took this opportunity to review the stages of realization of this project, registered since 2007 with a program authorization of 6 billion DA. In 2009, a Portuguese design office was appointed to provide technical assistance to the project. In February 2010, the operation was reassessed and the program authorization exceeded 15 billion DA. In 2011 and 2012, two national and international calls for tender launched for the selection of a design office were canceled by the tender opening committee due to certain reservations and for non-compliance with the clauses of the specifications.

=== Return the project again ===
On May 24, 2023 the Wilaya of Sétif announced the resumption of the study for the construction of the new multi-sports stadium. The sports arena should cost the state 125 billion cents according to initial estimates. It will be able to accommodate 50,000 people during sporting events.
