= Les Eucalyptus =

- Municipality
- Commune of Les Eucalyptus
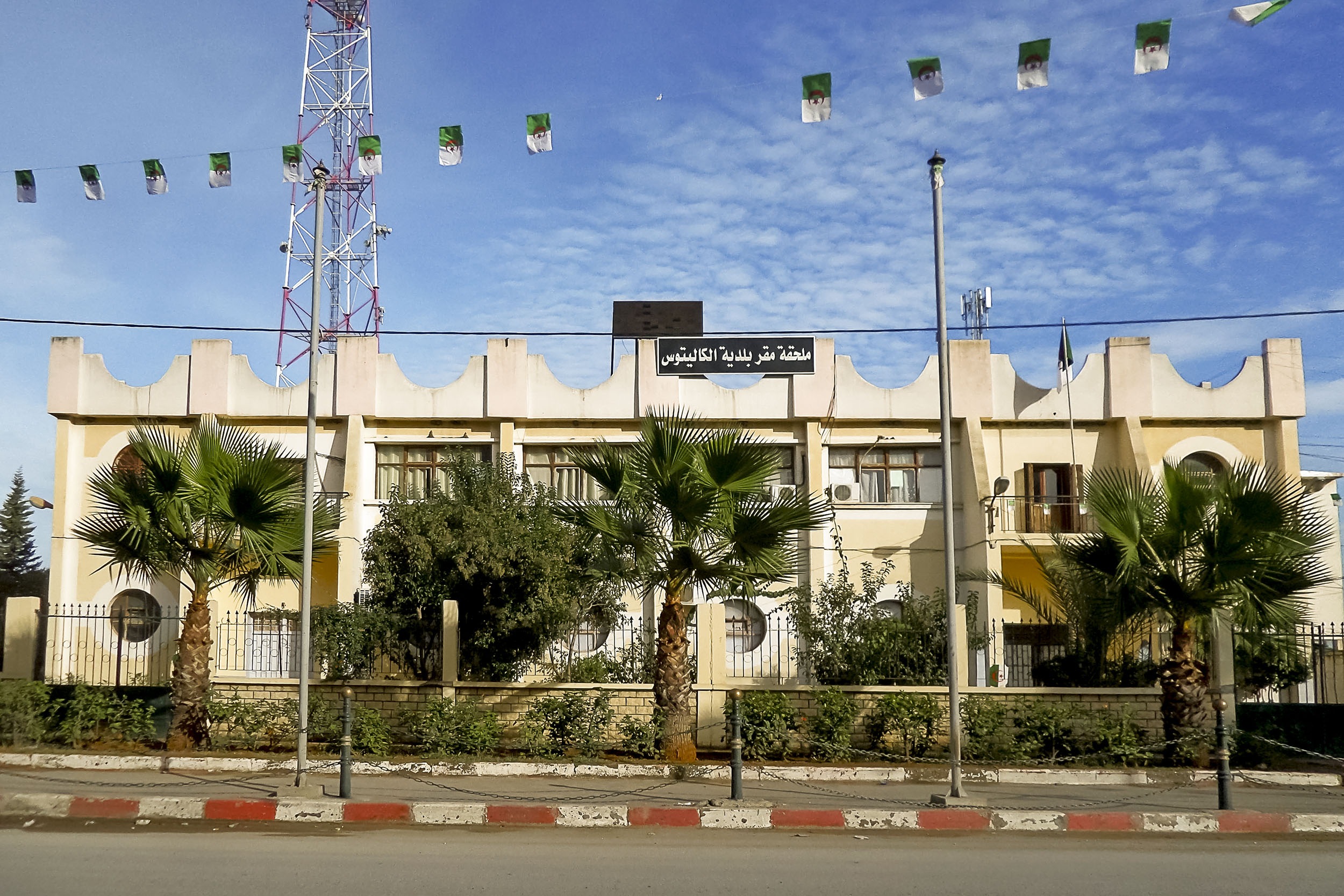
- Les Eucalyptus council building

- Location of the commune within Algiers

- Location within Algeria
- Coordinates: 36°39′N 3°09′E
- Country: Algeria
- Province: Algiers
- Time zone: UTC+1 (Coordinated Universal Time)

Les Eucalyptus is a suburb of the city of Algiers in northern Algeria.
