= 2017 Guangzhou R&F F.C. season =

Guangzhou R&F
2017 season
- Head coach: Dragan Stojković
- Stadium: Yuexiushan Stadium; Guangdong Provincial People's Stadium (Note: The original home stadium of Guangzhou R&F F.C., Yuexiushan Stadium, was under renovation. It was unusable until 28 April 2017. So in the first 2 round of Chinese Super League, Guangzhou R&F had to go to Guangdong Provincial People's Stadium as their home stadium instead. They have moved back to Yuexiushan Stadium since Round 7 of the Chinese Super league.)
- Super League: 5th
- FA Cup: Fifth round
- Top goalscorer: League: Eran Zahavi (27); All: Eran Zahavi (31)
- Highest home attendance: 12,860 vs Guangzhou Evergrande Taobao; 19 July 2017 (FA Cup)
- Lowest home attendance: 5,373 vs Changchun Yatai; 12 March 2017 (Super League)
- Average home league attendance: 9,904
| Home colours | Away colours |

The 2017 Guangzhou R&F season is the 7th year in Guangzhou R&F's existence and its 7th season in the Chinese football league, also its 6th season in the top flight.

== Review ==
- 7 November 2016, Guangzhou R&F confirmed that Lu Lin, Huang Zhengyu and Zeng Chao signed a renewed contract with Guangzhou R&F.
- 25 November 2016, Guangzhou R&F confirmed that Tang Miao signed a renewed contract with Guangzhou R&F until the end of the 2021.
- 25 January 2017, Guangzhou R&F confirmed that Eran Zahavi signed a renewed contract with Guangzhou R&F until the end of the 2020.
- 25 January 2017, Guangzhou R&F confirmed that Wang Song and Xiao Zhi signed a renewed contract with Guangzhou R&F.
- 7 February 2017, Guangzhou R&F confirmed that Chang Feiya signed a renewed contract with Guangzhou R&F until the end of the 2019.
- 21 February 2017, Guangzhou R&F confirmed that Renatinho signed a renewed contract with Guangzhou R&F until the end of the 2019.

== Coaching and medical staff ==
| Position | Staff |
|---|---|
| Head coach | (Serbia) Dragan Stojković |
| Assistant coaches | (Serbia) Žarko Đurović |
| Assistant coaches | (Serbia) Dejan Govedarica |
| Fitness coach | (Japan) Katsuhito Kinoshi |
| Goalkeeper coach | (China) Huang Hongtao |
| Team leader | (China) Huang Jun |
| Team physicians | (China) Fan Bihua |
| Team physicians | (Netherlands) Marco van der Steen |
| Physiotherapist | (Netherlands) Raldy van Haastert |
| Performance manager | (United States) Bito Wu |
| Interpreters | (China) Hong Wenjie |
| Interpreters | (China) Weng Zhanhong |
| Interpreters | (China) Piao Jun |

Source: Guangzhou R&F F.C.

== Squad ==
=== Winter ===
As of 3 March 2017

==== First team ====
Note: Flags indicate national team as defined under FIFA eligibility rules; some limited exceptions apply. Players may hold more than one non-FIFA nationality.

| No. | Pos. | Nation | Player |
|---|---|---|---|
| 1 | GK | CHN | Cheng Yuelei |
| 3 | FW | CHN | Xiang Baixu |
| 4 | MF | CHN | Zhang Gong |
| 7 | MF | ISR | Eran Zahavi |
| 8 | MF | BRA | Júnior Urso |
| 9 | FW | AUS | Apostolos Giannou |
| 10 | MF | BRA | Renatinho |
| 11 | DF | CHN | Jiang Zhipeng (Captain) |
| 13 | MF | CHN | Ye Chugui |
| 14 | FW | CHN | Zeng Chao |
| 16 | GK | CHN | Pei Chensong |
| 17 | DF | CHN | Zhang Chenlong |
| 18 | DF | CHN | Yi Teng |
| 19 | DF | CHN | Jiang Jihong |
| 20 | MF | CHN | Tang Miao |

| No. | Pos. | Nation | Player |
|---|---|---|---|
| 22 | DF | KOR | Jang Hyun-Soo |
| 23 | MF | CHN | Lu Lin |
| 25 | GK | CHN | Han Feng |
| 26 | FW | CHN | Ma Junliang |
| 27 | MF | CHN | Chen Fuhai |
| 28 | MF | CHN | Wang Jia'nan |
| 29 | FW | CHN | Xiao Zhi |
| 32 | MF | CHN | Chen Zhizhao |
| 34 | MF | CHN | Wang Xinhui |
| 35 | MF | CHN | Li Tixiang |
| 36 | MF | CHN | Huang Zhengyu |
| 37 | MF | CHN | Li Yuyang |
| 38 | FW | CHN | Zhang Jiajie |
| 39 | MF | CHN | Zhao Keda |
| 40 | DF | CHN | Chen Weiming |

==== Reserve team ====
Note: Flags indicate national team as defined under FIFA eligibility rules; some limited exceptions apply. Players may hold more than one non-FIFA nationality.

| No. | Pos. | Nation | Player |
|---|---|---|---|
| 41 | DF | CHN | Li Lei |
| 43 | DF | CHN | Ye Ruiwen |
| 46 | DF | CHN | Deng Zhiyao |
| 47 | FW | CHN | Tong Hui |
| 48 | MF | CHN | Deng Yanlin |
| 49 | GK | CHN | Ji Xiangzheng |

| No. | Pos. | Nation | Player |
|---|---|---|---|
| 50 | FW | CHN | Zhang Jianjun |
| 51 | MF | CHN | Bu Wenhao |
| 52 | FW | CHN | Huang Jingbin |
| 53 | DF | CHN | Bi Guanghuan |
| 60 | DF | CHN | Zhao Ming |

=== Summer ===
As of 14 July 2017

==== First team ====
Note: Flags indicate national team as defined under FIFA eligibility rules; some limited exceptions apply. Players may hold more than one non-FIFA nationality.

| No. | Pos. | Nation | Player |
|---|---|---|---|
| 1 | GK | CHN | Cheng Yuelei |
| 3 | FW | CHN | Xiang Baixu |
| 4 | MF | CHN | Zhang Gong |
| 5 | DF | ISL | Sölvi Ottesen |
| 6 | MF | CHN | Yang Wanshun |
| 7 | MF | ISR | Eran Zahavi |
| 8 | MF | BRA | Júnior Urso |
| 9 | FW | AUS | Apostolos Giannou |
| 10 | MF | BRA | Renatinho |
| 11 | DF | CHN | Jiang Zhipeng (Captain) |
| 13 | MF | CHN | Ye Chugui |
| 14 | FW | CHN | Zeng Chao |
| 15 | MF | CHN | Ning An |
| 17 | DF | CHN | Zhang Chenlong |
| 18 | DF | CHN | Yi Teng |
| 19 | DF | CHN | Jiang Jihong |

| No. | Pos. | Nation | Player |
|---|---|---|---|
| 20 | DF | CHN | Tang Miao |
| 21 | DF | CHN | Zhu Di |
| 23 | MF | CHN | Lu Lin |
| 24 | FW | CHN | Mai Jiajian |
| 25 | GK | CHN | Han Feng |
| 26 | FW | CHN | Ma Junliang |
| 28 | MF | CHN | Wang Jia'nan |
| 29 | FW | CHN | Xiao Zhi |
| 32 | MF | CHN | Chen Zhizhao |
| 35 | MF | CHN | Li Tixiang |
| 36 | DF | CHN | Huang Zhengyu |
| 37 | MF | CHN | Li Yuyang |
| 39 | MF | CHN | Zhao Keda |
| 40 | DF | CHN | Chen Weiming |
| 45 | GK | CHN | Long Wenhao |
| 50 | FW | CHN | Zhang Jianjun |

==== Reserve team ====
Note: Flags indicate national team as defined under FIFA eligibility rules; some limited exceptions apply. Players may hold more than one non-FIFA nationality.

| No. | Pos. | Nation | Player |
|---|---|---|---|
| 41 | DF | CHN | Li Lei |
| 42 | DF | CHN | Ma Weichao |
| 44 | MF | CHN | Wei Zongren |
| 46 | DF | CHN | Deng Zhiyao |
| 47 | FW | CHN | Tong Hui |

| No. | Pos. | Nation | Player |
|---|---|---|---|
| 49 | GK | CHN | Ji Xiangzheng |
| 51 | MF | CHN | Bu Wenhao |
| 52 | FW | CHN | Huang Jingbin |
| 53 | DF | CHN | Bi Guanghuan |
| 54 | GK | CHN | Xing Yu |

== Transfers ==
=== Winter ===
==== In ====
| Squad number | Position | Player | Age | Moving from | Type | Transfer fee | Date | Source |
|---|---|---|---|---|---|---|---|---|
| 4 | DMF | (China) Zhang Gong | 24 | (China) Dalian Transcendence | Transfer | Free transfer | 19 November 2016 | |
| 35 | MF | (China) Li Tixiang | 27 | (China) Shijiazhuang Ever Bright | Transfer | Free transfer | 19 November 2016 | |
| 3 | FW | (China) Xiang Baixu | 21 | (China) Tianjin Quanjian | Transfer | €2,000,000 | 25 November 2016 | |
| - | RB | (China) Zhang Yuan | 27 | (China) Beijing Renhe | Loan return | | 15 December 2016 | |
| 18 | DF | (China) Yi Teng | 26 | (China) Guangzhou Evergrande Taobao | Transfer | Swap deal | 29 December 2016 | |
| - | FW | (Democratic Republic of the Congo) Jeremy Bokila | 28 | (Qatar) Al Kharaitiyat SC | Loan return | | 31 December 2016 | |
| 8 | DMF | (Brazil) Júnior Urso | 29 | (China) Shandong Luneng Taishan | Transfer | €2,850,000 | 9 January 2017 | |
| 19 | DF | (China) Jiang Jihong | 26 | (China) Shijiazhuang Ever Bright | Transfer | Free transfer | 20 January 2017 | |

==== Out ====
| Squad number | Position | Player | Age | Moving to | Type | Transfer fee | Date | Source |
|---|---|---|---|---|---|---|---|---|
| - | RB | (China) Zhang Yuan | 27 | (China) Shenzhen F.C. | Transfer | Free transfer | 15 December 2016 | |
| 3 | DF | (China) Yu Yang | 27 | (China) Beijing Sinobo Guoan | Transfer | €8,270,000 | 30 December 2016 | |
| 8 | LM | (China) Wang Xiaolong | 30 | (China) Tianjin Quanjian | Transfer | €4,950,000 | 22 January 2017 | |
| 7 | DMF | (Sweden) Gustav Svensson | 29 | (United States) Seattle Sounders FC | Transfer | Undisclosed | 30 January 2017 | |
| 21 | RMF | (China) Chang Feiya | 24 | (China) Guizhou Hengfeng Zhicheng | Loan out | | 7 February 2017 | |
| 25 | FW | (Nigeria) Aaron Olanare | 22 | (Russia) CSKA Moscow | Transfer | Free transfer | 13 February 2017 | |
| 28 | FW | (Democratic Republic of the Congo) Jeremy Bokila | 28 | (Turkey) Akhisar Belediyespor | Transfer | Free transfer | 13 February 2017 | |
| 5 | DF | (China) Zhang Yaokun | 35 | (China) Wuhan Zall | Transfer | Free transfer | 27 February 2017 | |
| - | MF | (China) Min Junlin | 23 | (China) Guizhou Hengfeng Zhicheng | Loan out | | 27 February 2017 | |
| - | DF | (China) Yang Ting | 23 | (China) Guizhou Hengfeng Zhicheng | Loan out | | 27 February 2017 | |
| 33 | DMF | (China) Wang Song | 35 | (China) Jiangsu Suning | Transfer | €5,500,000 | 28 February 2017 | |

=== Summer ===
==== In ====
| Squad number | Position | Player | Age | Moving from | Type | Transfer fee | Date | Source |
|---|---|---|---|---|---|---|---|---|
| 5 | DF | (Iceland) Sölvi Ottesen | 33 | (Thailand) Buriram United | Transfer | Free transfer | 13 July 2017 | |
| 6 | MF | (China) Yang Wanshun | 21 | (China) Jiangsu Yancheng Dingli | Transfer | €103,000 | 14 July 2017 | |

==== Out ====
| Squad number | Position | Player | Age | Moving to | Type | Transfer fee | Date | Source |
|---|---|---|---|---|---|---|---|---|
| 22 | DF | (South Korea) Jang Hyun-Soo | 25 | (Japan) FC Tokyo | Transfer | Undisclosed | 12 July 2017 | |

== Friendlies ==
=== Pre-season ===
| 21 January 2017 | Guangzhou R&F | 4–1 | Guizhou Hengfeng Zhicheng | Guangzhou, Guangdong |
| | Zahavi 17' (pen.); Urso 30'; Ye Chugui (?) | | Li Yingjian 50' | Stadium: South China University of Technology South Campus |

| 28 January 2017 | Malawi | 2–2 | (China) Guangzhou R&F | Lilongwe, Malawi |
| 13:30 UTC+2 | Katinji 35', 58' | | Xiao Zhi 80'; Zeng Chao (?) | Stadium: Bingu National Stadium |

| 7 February 2017 | (Australia) Gold Coast City | 0–3 | (China) Guangzhou R&F | Gold Coast, Queensland, Australia |
| | | | Zahavi (?); Lu Lin (?) | Stadium: Super Sports Centre |

| 9 February 2017 | (Australia) Moreton Bay United | 2–3 | (China) Guangzhou R&F | Moreton Bay, Queensland, Australia |
| | Janovsky; Munn | | Zahavi; Chen Zhizhao; Renatinho | Stadium: Wolter Park |

| 11 February 2017 | (Australia) Gold Coast City | 2–3 | (China) Guangzhou R&F | Brisbane, Queensland, Australia |
| | Reus; Smith | | Zahavi (?); Urso | Stadium: Perry Park |

| 15 February 2017 | (Australia) Brisbane Strikers | 2–2 | (China) Guangzhou R&F | Brisbane, Queensland, Australia |
| | Lee; Stewart | | Zahavi 24'; Giannou 26' | Stadium: Perry Park |

| 17 February 2017 | (Australia) Brisbane City | 0–6 | (China) Guangzhou R&F | Brisbane, Queensland, Australia |
| | | | Zahavi (?); Xiang Baixu (?); Renatinho (?) | Stadium: Perry Park |

| 26 February 2017 | Guangzhou R&F | 1–4 | Shanghai Shenxin | Guangzhou, Guangdong |
| | Biro-Biro (?); Pan Chaoran | | Xiang Baixu | Stadium: Guangdong Provincial People's Stadium |

=== Mid-season ===
| 3 September 2017 | (China) Guangzhou R&F | 4–2 | R&F (Hong Kong) | Guangzhou, Guangdong |
| 17:00 UTC+8 | Ye Chugui (?); Mai Jiajian (?); Tang Miao (?); Ottesen (?) | | Bruninho (?) | Stadium: Yuexiushan Stadium; Referee: Katsuhito Kinoshi; Assistant referees: Li Zhihai, Chen Qingming |

| 7 October 2017 | Guangzhou R&F | 5–2 | Meizhou Hakka | Guangzhou, Guangdong |
| 17:00 UTC+8 | Zahavi 40', 45+3'; Renatinho 45'; Lu Lin 58'; Giannou 90' (pen.) | | Sankoh 10'; Chen Jianlong 75' | Stadium: Yuexiushan Stadium; Referee: Katsuhito Kinoshi; Assistant referees: Li Zhihai, Chen Qingming |

== Competitions ==
Win Draw Loss

=== Chinese Super League ===
==== Table ====
| Pos | Team | Pld | W | D | L | GF | GA | GD | Pts | Qualification or relegation |
|---|---|---|---|---|---|---|---|---|---|---|
| 3 | Tianjin Quanjian | 30 | 15 | 9 | 6 | 46 | 33 | +13 | 54 | Qualification to Champions League play-off round |
| 4 | Hebei China Fortune | 30 | 15 | 7 | 8 | 55 | 38 | +17 | 52 | |
| 5 | Guangzhou R&F | 30 | 15 | 7 | 8 | 59 | 46 | +13 | 52 | |
| 6 | Shandong Luneng Taishan | 30 | 13 | 10 | 7 | 49 | 33 | +16 | 49 | |
| 7 | Changchun Yatai | 30 | 12 | 8 | 10 | 46 | 41 | +5 | 44 | |

Source: League table
Rules for classification: 1) Points; 2) Head-to-head points; 3) Head-to-head goal difference; 4) Head-to-head goals scored; 5) Reserve league points; 6) Goal difference; 7) Goals scored; 8) Disciplinary points (1 point for each yellow card, 3 points for each red card); 9) Draw

==== Results by round ====
| Round | 1 | 2 | 3 | 4 | 5 | 6 | 7 | 8 | 9 | 10 | 11 | 12 | 13 | 14 | 15 | 16 | 17 | 18 | 19 | 20 | 21 | 22 | 23 | 24 | 25 | 26 | 27 | 28 | 29 | 30 |
|---|---|---|---|---|---|---|---|---|---|---|---|---|---|---|---|---|---|---|---|---|---|---|---|---|---|---|---|---|---|---|
| Ground | H | H | A | A | A | A | H | A | H | A | H | A | H | A | H | A | A | H | H | H | H | A | H | A | H | A | H | A | H | A |
| Result | W | W | W | D | W | W | L | L | D | D | D | D | D | W | L | L | L | W | W | W | W | L | D | L | W | L | W | W | W | W |
| Position | 3 | 3 | 2 | 1 | 1 | 1 | 2 | 4 | 3 | 4 | 5 | 5 | 5 | 5 | 6 | 6 | 8 | 8 | 6 | 5 | 4 | 6 | 6 | 7 | 6 | 6 | 6 | 6 | 5 | 5 |

Updated to match(es) played on 4 November 2017. Source: Chinese Super League Table (in Chinese)
A = Away; H = Home; W = Win; D = Draw; L = Loss

==== Results summary ====
| Overall | | | | | | | | Home | | | | | | Away | | | | | |
| Pld | W | D | L | GF | GA | GD | Pts | W | D | L | GF | GA | GD | W | D | L | GF | GA | GD |
|---|---|---|---|---|---|---|---|---|---|---|---|---|---|---|---|---|---|---|---|
| 30 | 15 | 7 | 8 | 59 | 46 | +13 | 52 | 9 | 4 | 2 | 36 | 22 | +14 | 6 | 3 | 6 | 23 | 24 | −1 |

Last updated: 4 November 2017.
Source: Competitive Matches

==== League Matches ====
| 4 March 2017 1 | Guangzhou R&F | 2–0 | Tianjin Quanjian | Guangzhou, Guangdong |
| 15:30 UTC+8 | Xiao Zhi 29'; Renaltinho 61'; Jiang Jihong (yellow card) 69' | Report | Su Yuanjie (yellow card) 82'; Zhang Cheng (yellow card) 90+2' | Stadium: Guangdong Provincial People's Stadium; Attendance: 8,978; Referee: Fu Ming; Assistant referees: Cao Yi, Yu Yue; Fourth official: Wang Jing |

| 12 March 2017 2 | Guangzhou R&F | 1–0 | Changchun Yatai | Guangzhou, Guangdong |
| 15:30 UTC+8 | Yi Teng (yellow card) 31'; Jiang Zhipeng (yellow card) 61'; Urso 70' | Report | Jack Sealy (yellow card) 7'; Yaki Yen (yellow card) 39'; Ighalo (penalty missed) 67' (pen.) | Stadium: Guangdong Provincial People's Stadium; Attendance: 5,373; Referee: Huang Yejun; Assistant referees: Liu Guiqing, Wu Huifeng; Fourth official: Ma Li |

| 1 April 2017 3 | Yanbian Funde | 0–1 | Guangzhou R&F | Yanbian, Jilin |
| 15:30 UTC+8 | Tian Yinong (yellow card) 36' | Report | Zhang Chenlong (yellow card) 33'; Chen Zhizhao (yellow card) 50'; Zahavi 74'; Cheng Yuelei (yellow card) 90' | Stadium: Yanji Nationwide Fitness Centre Stadium; Attendance: 27,523; Referee: Gu Chunhan; Assistant referees: Song Xiangyun, Yang Li; Fourth official: Ai Kun |

| 8 April 2017 4 | Guangzhou Evergrande | 2–2 | Guangzhou R&F | Guangzhou, Guangdong |
| 19:35 UTC+8 | Alan 9'; Mei Fang (yellow card) 20'; Zheng Zhi (yellow card) 63'; Huang Bowen (yellow card) 79'; Gao Lin 90+1'; Zhang Linpeng (yellow card) 90+4' | Report | Zahavi 42' (pen.); Renaltinho 64'; Chen Zhizhao (yellow card) 72' | Stadium: Tianhe Stadium; Attendance: 47,811; Referee: Wang Di; Assistant referees: Ma Ji, Zhang Cheng; Fourth official: Shen Yinhao |

| 17 April 2017 5 | Liaoning Shenyang Kaixin | 1–4 | Guangzhou R&F | Shenyang, Liaoning |
| 15:30 UTC+8 | James 39' (pen.); Hu Yanqiang (yellow card) 66' | Report | Zahavi 18', 61'; Xiao Zhi 71'; Renaltinho 76' | Stadium: Shenyang Olympic Sports Center Stadium; Attendance: 7,015; Referee: Shen Yinhao; Assistant referees: Zhou Fei, Deng Bo; Fourth official: Chen Xin |

| 21 April 2017 6 | Jiangsu Suning | 1–2 | Guangzhou R&F | Nanjing, Jiangsu |
| 19:35 UTC+8 | Teixeira 35'; Yang Boyu (yellow card) 47'; Ji Xiang (yellow card) 75' | Report | Li Tixiang (yellow card) 8'; Zahavi 62', 77' | Stadium: Nanjing Olympic Sports Centre; Attendance: 30,053; Referee: Zhang Long; Assistant referees: Sun Kai, Liu Jinyu; Fourth official: Dong Kun |

| 28 April 2017 7 | Guangzhou R&F | 1–3 | Guizhou Hengfeng Zhicheng | Guangzhou, Guangdong |
| 19:35 UTC+8 | Zahavi 1'; Xiao Zhi (yellow card) 50'; Zeng Chao (yellow card) 86' | Report | Jelavić (yellow card) 12'; Olunga 22'; Jiang Liang (yellow card) 56' (red card) 86'; Jelavić 76', 90+5' | Stadium: Yuexiushan Stadium; Attendance: 12,823; Referee: Lin Jun; Assistant referees: Huo Weiming, Yang Yang; Fourth official: Wu Liying |

| 7 May 2017 8 | Shandong Luneng Taishan | 3–0 | Guangzhou R&F | Jinan, Shandong |
| 19:35 UTC+8 | Zhang Chi 13', 20'; Tardelli 60' | Report | Zahavi (penalty missed) 73' (pen.) | Stadium: Jinan Olympic Sports Center Stadium; Attendance: 27,856; Referee: Wang Zhe; Assistant referees: Song Xiangyun, Yang Li; Fourth official: Wang Jing |

| 12 May 2017 9 | Guangzhou R&F | 1–1 | Hebei China Fortune | Guangzhou, Guangdong |
| 19:35 UTC+8 | Lu Lin (yellow card) 73'; Zahavi 87' | Report | Zhang Chengdong (yellow card) 32'; Zhao Mingjian (yellow card) 68'; Lavezzi 86' | Stadium: Yuexiushan Stadium; Attendance: 8,131; Referee: Ai Kun; Assistant referees: Lou Fangping, Tang Rongdi; Fourth official: Jin Jingyuan |

| 19 May 2017 10 | Beijing Sinobo Guoan | 2–2 | Guangzhou R&F | Beijing |
| 18:00 UTC+8 | Jin Taiyan (yellow card) 12'; Zhang Chiming 68'; Song Boxuan 90+4' | Report | Jiang Jihong (yellow card) 11'; Renaltinho (yellow card) 24'; Zahavi 52'; Xiao Zhi 54'; Jiang Zhipeng (yellow card) 85' | Stadium: Workers' Stadium; Attendance: 28,251; Referee: Lin Jun; Assistant referees: Wang Dexin, Yang Li; Fourth official: Wu Liying |

| 26 May 2017 11 | Guangzhou R&F | 0–0 | Shanghai Greenland Shenhua | Guangzhou, Guangdong |
| 20:00 UTC+8 | Xiao Zhi (yellow card) 70' | Report | Cao Yunding (yellow card) 59' | Stadium: Yuexiushan Stadium; Attendance: 10,930; Referee: Ma Li; Assistant referees: Song Xiangyun, Huang Tao; Fourth official: Luo Haitao |

| 2 June 2017 12 | Henan Jianye | 1–1 | Guangzhou R&F | Zhengzhou, Henan |
| 19:35 UTC+8 | Feng Zhuoyi (yellow card) 43'; Bassogog 90+1' | Report | Zhang Chenlong (yellow card) 33'; Renaltinho 38'; Xiao Zhi (yellow card) 46'; Zahavi (yellow card) 76'; Tang Miao (yellow card) 82' | Stadium: Hanghai Stadium; Attendance: 13,169; Referee: Wang Jing; Assistant referees: Lou Fangping, Shen Pengxiang; Fourth official: Wu Liying |

| 18 June 2017 13 | Guangzhou R&F | 1–1 | Shanghai SIPG | Guangzhou, Guangdong |
| 19:35 UTC+8 | Zahavi 30'; Jiang Zhipeng (yellow card) 44'; Urso (yellow card) 44'; Chen Zhizhao (yellow card) 45+8'; Li Tixiang (red card) 45+8'; Huang Zhengyu (yellow card) 85'; Tang Miao (yellow card) 88' | Report | Wang Shenchao (yellow card) 17'; Hulk 44'; Fu Huan (red card) 45+8' | Stadium: Yuexiushan Stadium; Attendance: 10,113; Referee: Zhou Gang; Assistant referees: Ma Ji, Yi Xueyun; Fourth official: Li Pan |

| 24 June 2017 14 | Tianjin TEDA Yili | 1–2 | Guangzhou R&F | Tianjin |
| 19:35 UTC+8 | Li Yuanyi (yellow card) 15'; Li Yuanyi 26'; Zhao Honglue (yellow card) 88' | Report | Zahavi 39'; Jiang Jihong (yellow card) 41'; Fu Yunlong (yellow card) 63'; Renaltinho (yellow card) 70'; Renaltinho 74' | Stadium: Tuanbo Stadium; Attendance: 11,016; Referee: Ai Kun; Assistant referees: Wang Dexin, Ma Kexi; Fourth official: Shi Zhenlu |

| 1 July 2017 15 | Guangzhou R&F | 3–4 | Chongqing Dangdai Lifan | Guangzhou, Guangdong |
| 19:35 UTC+8 | Zahavi 57', 81'; Ye Chugui (yellow card) 76'; Tang Miao 88' | Report | Chen Lei (yellow card) 22'; Kardec 45+1'; Wu Qing 67'; Fernandinho 72'; Feng Jing (yellow card) 80'; Feng Jing 83'; Deng Xiaofei (yellow card) 85' | Stadium: Yuexiushan Stadium; Attendance: 11,013; Referee: Fu Ming; Assistant referees: Huo Weiming, Xu Xianghui; Fourth official: Wang Jing |

| 7 July 2017 16 | Tianjin Quanjian | 2–1 | Guangzhou R&F | Tianjin |
| 19:35 UTC+8 | Sun Ke 25'; Zhao Xuri (yellow card) 32'; Zhang Cheng (yellow card) 48'; Pei Shuai (yellow card) 87'; Witsel 90' | Report | Renaltinho (yellow card) 32'; Jiang Jihong (yellow card) 43'; Zahavi 45'; Urso (yellow card) 90+3' | Stadium: Haihe Educational Football Stadium; Attendance: 25,678; Referee: Gu Chunhan; Assistant referees: Ma Kexi, Yi Xueyun; Fourth official: Huang Yejun |

| 16 July 2017 17 | Changchun Yatai | 3–2 | Guangzhou R&F | Changchun, Jilin |
| 15:30 UTC+8 | Ighalo 54', 88'; Ighalo (yellow card) 58'; Huszti (penalty missed) 69' (pen.); Zhang Li (yellow card) 75'; Du Zhenyu 79' | Report | Ye Chugui 20'; Ye Chugui (yellow card) 45'; Zhang Gong (yellow card) 72'; Zahavi (yellow card) 76'; Xiao Zhi 84' | Stadium: Development Area Stadium; Attendance: 17,826; Referee: Ai Kun; Assistant referees: Zhang Cheng, Zhou Fei; Fourth official: Chen Xin |

| 23 July 2017 18 | Guangzhou R&F | 6–2 | Yanbian Funde | Guangzhou, Guangdong |
| 19:35 UTC+8 | Renaltinho 11'; Zahavi 31', 56', 65', 72'; Urso 41'; Zhang Chenlong (yellow card) 90' | Report | Steve 29', 52' | Stadium: Yuexiushan Stadium; Attendance: 9,386; Referee: Zhang Lei; Assistant referees: Wang Dexin, Yu Yue; Fourth official: Gu Chunhan |

| 29 July 2017 19 | Guangzhou R&F | 4–2 | Guangzhou Evergrande Taobao | Guangzhou, Guangdong |
| 19:35 UTC+8 | Renaltinho (yellow card) 7'; Zahavi 38', 85'; Urso (yellow card) 45'; Renaltinho 53', 66'; Jiang Jihong (yellow card) 90+2' | Report | Huang Bowen (yellow card) 9'; Gao Lin (yellow card) 35'; Yu Hanchao (yellow card) 45'; Yu Hanchao 52'; Gao Lin 90' | Stadium: Yuexiushan Stadium; Attendance: 12,386; Referee: Guan Xing; Assistant referees: Huo Weiming, Zhou Fei; Fourth official: Wang Zhe |

| 6 August 2017 20 | Guangzhou R&F | 4–1 | Liaoning Shenyang Kaixin | Guangzhou, Guangdong |
| 19:35 UTC+8 | Ottesen 10'; Zahavi 25', 90+5'; Tang Miao 28' | Report | Assani 36'; Ujah (yellow card) 90+3' | Stadium: Yuexiushan Stadium; Attendance: 9,668; Referee: Shen Yinhao; Assistant referees: Zhang Qiangjing, Deng Bo; Fourth official: Shi Zhenlu |

| 9 August 2017 21 | Guangzhou R&F | 4–2 | Jiangsu Suning | Guangzhou, Guangdong |
| 19:35 UTC+8 | Lu Lin 45'; Zahavi 55'; Xiao Zhi 62'; Renaltinho 72'; Li Tixiang (yellow card) 79'; Jiang Zhipeng (yellow card) 84' | Report | Martínez 3', 89'; Gu Chao (yellow card) 21'; Ramires (yellow card) 38'; Zhou Yun (yellow card) 76'; Martínez (yellow card) 81' | Stadium: Yuexiushan Stadium; Attendance: 9,886; Referee: Lin Jun; Assistant referees: Wang Dexin, Ma Kexi; Fourth official: Wu Liying |

| 13 August 2017 22 | Guizhou Hengfeng Zhicheng | 2–0 | Guangzhou R&F | Guiyang, Guizhou |
| 15:30 UTC+8 | Castro 21'; Min Junlin 58'; Festus (yellow card) 58' | Report | Ottesen (yellow card) 32' (red card) 38'; Renaltinho (yellow card) 72' | Stadium: Guiyang Olympic Sports Center; Attendance: 23,276; Referee: Ma Ning; Assistant referees: Shi Xiang, Huang Tao; Fourth official: Xia Jun |

| 20 August 2017 23 | Guangzhou R&F | 1–1 | Shandong Luneng Taishan | Guangzhou, Guangdong |
| 19:35 UTC+8 | Zahavi 60' (pen.); Zahavi (yellow card) 80' | Report | Jin Jingdao (yellow card) 30'; Pellè 64' | Stadium: Yuexiushan Stadium; Attendance: 11,268; Referee: Shi Zhenlu; Assistant referees: Zhou Fei, Yi Xueyun; Fourth official: Shen Yinhao |

| 10 September 2017 24 | Hebei China Fortune | 2–1 | Guangzhou R&F | Qinhuangdao, Hebei |
| 19:35 UTC+8 | Mbia (yellow card) 20'; Zhao Yuhao (yellow card) 30'; Aloísio 35'; Zhang Lifeng 38'; Lavezzi (yellow card) 46'; Ding Haifeng (yellow card) 90' | Report | Yi Teng 58'; Zhang Gong (yellow card) 59'; Jiang Jihong (yellow card) 66' | Stadium: Qinhuangdao Olympic Sports Center Stadium; Attendance: 18,223; Referee: Ai Kun; Assistant referees: Sun Kai, Zhang Hongwei; Fourth official: Wu Liying |

| 16 September 2017 25 | Guangzhou R&F | 2–1 | Beijing Sinobo Guoan | Guangzhou, Guangdong |
| 19:35 UTC+8 | Chen Zhizhao 28'; Chen Zhizhao (yellow card) 64'; Zahavi 68' | Report | Augusto (yellow card) 43'; Soriano 60'; Song Boxuan (yellow card) 62' | Stadium: Yuexiushan Stadium; Attendance: 10,268; Referee: Ma Ning; Assistant referees: Shi Xiang, Huang Tao; Fourth official: Xia Jun |

| 23 September 2017 26 | Shanghai Greenland Shenhua | 3–1 | Guangzhou R&F | Shanghai |
| 19:35 UTC+8 | Guarín 28'; Wang Shouting (yellow card) 29'; Moreno 46' (pen.), 90+1' | Report | Zhang Gong (yellow card) 27'; Huang Zhengyu (yellow card) 36'; Yi Teng (yellow card) 45'; Xiao Zhi 55' | Stadium: Hongkou Football Stadium; Attendance: 21,361; Referee: Wang Zhe; Assistant referees: Wu Huifeng, Yi Xueyun; Fourth official: Li Pan |

| 15 October 2017 27 | Guangzhou R&F | 3–2 | Henan Jianye | Guangzhou, Guangdong |
| 19:35 UTC+8 | Huang Zhengyu (yellow card) 13'; Xiao Zhi 28'; Lu Lin (yellow card) 41'; Renaltinho 56', 90+1' | Report | Chen Hao (yellow card) 33'; Ricardo Vaz Tê 67'; Liu Heng (yellow card) 70'; Bassogog 77' | Stadium: Yuexiushan Stadium; Attendance: 8,088; Referee: Zhang Lei; Assistant referees: Wang Dexin, Song Xiangyun; Fourth official: Jin Jingyuan |

| 22 October 2017 28 | Shanghai SIPG | 1–2 | Guangzhou R&F | Shanghai |
| 19:35 UTC+8 | Hulk (penalty missed) 22' (pen.); Hulk 59'; Hulk (yellow card) 72'; Fu Huan (yellow card) 82' | Report | Jiang Jihong 4'; Renaltinho (yellow card) 39'; Zahavi 48' | Stadium: Shanghai Stadium; Attendance: 25,567; Referee: Pavel Královec; Assistant referees: Martin Wilczek, Ivo Nadvornik; Fourth official: Li Pan |

| 29 October 2017 29 | Guangzhou R&F | 3–2 | Tianjin TEDA Yili | Guangzhou, Guangdong |
| 15:00 UTC+8 | Renaltinho 47'; Giannou 77', 81' | Report | Zhao Honglüe (yellow card) 31'; Pan Ximing (yellow card) 38'; Qiu Tianyi (yellow card) 45'; Acheampong 65'; Gudelj 82' | Stadium: Yuexiushan Stadium; Attendance: 11,256; Referee: Huang Yejun; Assistant referees: Huo Weiming, Xu Xianghui; Fourth official: Liu Lin |

| 4 November 2017 30 | Chongqing Dangdai Lifan | 0–2 | Guangzhou R&F | Chongqing |
| 15:00 UTC+8 | Peng Xinli (yellow card) 69'; Fernandinho (yellow card) 74'; Wu Qing (yellow card) 83' | Report | Tang Miao (yellow card) 17'; Zahavi 37'; Chen Zhizhao (yellow card) 54'; Renaltinho (yellow card) 65'; Yi Teng 70'; Cheng Yuelei (yellow card) 90+3' | Stadium: Chongqing Olympic Sports Center; Referee: Wang Zhe; Assistant referees: Liu Guiqing, Wu Huifeng; Fourth official: Zhao Zhizhi |

=== Chinese FA Cup ===
| 2 May 2017 Third round | Qingdao Huanghai | 1–4 | Guangzhou R&F | Qingdao, Shandong |
| 19:35 UTC+8 | Zhang Zhen (yellow card) 18'; Duan Yu (yellow card) 33'; Yao Jiangshan (yellow card) 42'; Verdú 61'; Verdú (yellow card) 62' | Report | Zahavi 4'; Renaltinho 25'; Li Tixiang (yellow card) 52'; Zeng Chao 68'; Tang Miao 82' | Stadium: Qingdao Guoxin Stadium; Attendance: 5,017; Referee: Xia Jun; Assistant referees: Shi Xiang, Huang Tao; Fourth official: Ma Ning |

| 21 June 2017 Fourth round | Nei Mongol Zhongyou | 0–0 (3–5 p) | Guangzhou R&F | Hohhot, Inner Mongolia |
| 19:35 UTC+8 | Quan Lei (yellow card) 56'; Davi (yellow card) 85'; Dorielton (yellow card) 87' | Report | Zhang Chenlong (yellow card) 17' | Stadium: Hohhot City Stadium; Attendance: 10,231; Referee: Kou Jianxun; Assistant referees: Shi Xiang, Huang Tao; Fourth official: Lin Jun |
| | Penalties |
| | Dorielton (penalty scored); Senghor (penalty scored); Luo Andong (penalty missed); Davi (penalty scored) | | (penalty scored) Zahavi; (penalty scored) Urso; (penalty scored) Zhang Chenlong; (penalty scored) Li Tixiang; (penalty scored) Lu Lin |

| 19 July 2017 Fifth round 1st Leg | Guangzhou R&F | 4–2 | Guangzhou Evergrande Taobao | Guangzhou, Guangdong |
| 20:00 UTC+8 | Renatinho 9', 69'; Zahavi 45', 52' (pen.); Chen Zhizhao (yellow card) 62'; Li Tixiang (yellow card) 90+2' | Report | Zheng Zhi 27'; Liao Lisheng (yellow card) 38'; Alan 85' | Stadium: Yuexiushan Stadium; Attendance: 12,860; Referee: Fu Ming; Assistant referees: Xu Xianghui, Yang Yang; Fourth official: Wang Zhe |

| 1 August 2017 Fifth round 2nd Leg | Guangzhou Evergrande Taobao | 7–2 (9–6 agg.) | Guangzhou R&F | Guangzhou, Guangdong |
| 20:00 UTC+8 | Kim Young-gwon (yellow card) 5'; Muriqui 14', 36'; Alan 23' (pen.), 82'; Liu Jian (yellow card) 28'; Feng Xiaoting (yellow card) 45+1'; Yu Hanchao 45+3'; Xu Xin (yellow card) 48'; Gao Lin 68'; Wang Shangyuan (yellow card) 70'; Zhang Chenglin (yellow card) 73' (goal) 75'; Li Xuepeng (yellow card) 87'; Zhang Wenzhao (yellow card) 87' | Report | Renatinho 7' (pen.); Jiang Zhipeng (yellow card) 18'; Urso (yellow card) 26'; Chen Zhizhao (yellow card) 40' (red card) 42'; Lu Lin (yellow card) 60'; Zahavi 71' (pen.) | Stadium: Tianhe Stadium; Attendance: 42,579; Referee: Ma Ning; Assistant referees: Shi Xiang, Song Xiangyun; Fourth official: Jin Jingyuan |

== Statistics ==
As of 4 November 2017

=== Appearances and goals ===
| No. | Pos. | Player | Super League | | | FA Cup | | | Total | | |
| No. | Pos. | Player | Apps. | Starts | Goals | Apps. | Starts | Goals | Apps. | Starts | Goals |
|---|---|---|---|---|---|---|---|---|---|---|---|
| 1 | GK | (China) Cheng Yuelei | 30 | 30 | 0 | 0 | 0 | 0 | 30 | 30 | 0 |
| 3 | FW | (China) Xiang Baixu | 9 | 2 | 0 | 2 | 2 | 0 | 11 | 4 | 0 |
| 4 | MF | (China) Zhang Gong | 13 | 4 | 0 | 0 | 0 | 0 | 13 | 4 | 0 |
| 7 | FW | (Israel) Eran Zahavi | 30 | 30 | 27 | 4 | 4 | 4 | 34 | 34 | 31 |
| 8 | MF | (Brazil) Júnior Urso | 18 | 18 | 2 | 3 | 3 | 0 | 21 | 21 | 2 |
| 9 | FW | (Australia) Apostolos Giannou | 7 | 4 | 2 | 0 | 0 | 0 | 7 | 4 | 2 |
| 10 | MF | (Brazil) Renatinho | 26 | 25 | 12 | 3 | 3 | 4 | 29 | 28 | 16 |
| 11 | DF | (China) Jiang Zhipeng | 28 | 26 | 0 | 3 | 3 | 0 | 31 | 29 | 0 |
| 13 | FW | (China) Ye Chugui | 16 | 3 | 1 | 4 | 1 | 0 | 20 | 4 | 1 |
| 14 | FW | (China) Zeng Chao | 13 | 1 | 0 | 3 | 0 | 1 | 16 | 1 | 1 |
| 17 | DF | (China) Zhang Chenlong | 7 | 4 | 0 | 3 | 1 | 0 | 10 | 5 | 0 |
| 18 | DF | (China) Yi Teng | 23 | 23 | 2 | 3 | 2 | 0 | 26 | 25 | 2 |
| 19 | DF | (China) Jiang Jihong | 23 | 19 | 1 | 2 | 2 | 0 | 25 | 21 | 1 |
| 20 | DF | (China) Tang Miao | 30 | 30 | 2 | 3 | 2 | 1 | 33 | 32 | 3 |
| 23 | MF | (China) Lu Lin | 29 | 23 | 1 | 4 | 3 | 0 | 33 | 26 | 1 |
| 25 | GK | (China) Han Feng | 0 | 0 | 0 | 4 | 4 | 0 | 4 | 4 | 0 |
| 28 | DF | (China) Wang Jia'nan | 1 | 0 | 0 | 1 | 1 | 0 | 2 | 1 | 0 |
| 29 | FW | (China) Xiao Zhi | 27 | 22 | 7 | 3 | 2 | 0 | 30 | 24 | 7 |
| 32 | MF | (China) Chen Zhizhao | 22 | 18 | 1 | 3 | 3 | 0 | 25 | 21 | 1 |
| 35 | MF | (China) Li Tixiang | 18 | 12 | 0 | 3 | 3 | 0 | 21 | 15 | 0 |
| 36 | DF | (China) Huang Zhengyu | 29 | 29 | 0 | 4 | 4 | 0 | 33 | 33 | 0 |
Players who are left Guangzhou R&F that have appeared this season:
| 22 | DF | (South Korea) Jang Hyun-Soo | 1 | 1 | 0 | 1 | 1 | 0 | 2 | 2 | 0 |
| 30 | DF | (China) Fu Yunlong | 2 | 2 | 0 | 0 | 0 | 0 | 2 | 2 | 0 |
Players who join Guangzhou R&F that have appeared this season:
| 5 | DF | (Iceland) Sölvi Ottesen | 5 | 4 | 1 | 0 | 0 | 0 | 5 | 4 | 1 |
| 24 | FW | (China) Mai Jiajian | 5 | 0 | 0 | 0 | 0 | 0 | 5 | 0 | 0 |
| TOTALS | | | | | 59 | | | 10 | | | 69 |

=== Goalscorers ===
| Rank | Player | No. | Pos. | Super League | FA Cup | Total |
|---|---|---|---|---|---|---|
| 1 | (Israel) Zahavi | 7 | FW | 27 | 4 | 31 |
| 2 | (Brazil) Renatinho | 10 | MF | 12 | 4 | 16 |
| 3 | (China) Xiao Zhi | 29 | FW | 7 | 0 | 7 |
| 4 | (China) Tang Miao | 20 | DF | 2 | 1 | 3 |
| 5 | (Brazil) Urso | 8 | MF | 2 | 0 | 2 |
| 5 | (Australia) Giannou | 9 | FW | 2 | 0 | 2 |
| 5 | (China) Yi Teng | 18 | DF | 2 | 0 | 2 |
| 8 | (Iceland) Ottesen | 5 | DF | 1 | 0 | 1 |
| 8 | (China) Ye Chugui | 13 | MF | 1 | 0 | 1 |
| 8 | (China) Zeng Chao | 14 | MF | 0 | 1 | 1 |
| 8 | (China) Jiang Jihong | 19 | DF | 1 | 0 | 1 |
| 8 | (China) Lu Lin | 23 | MF | 1 | 0 | 1 |
| 8 | (China) Chen Zhizhao | 32 | MF | 1 | 0 | 1 |
| TOTALS | | | | 59 | 10 | 69 |

=== Assists ===
| Rank | Player | No. | Pos. | Super League | FA Cup | Total |
|---|---|---|---|---|---|---|
| TOTALS | | | | 0 | 0 | 0 |

=== Disciplinary record ===
| No. | Pos. | Player | Super League | | | FA Cup | | | Total | | |
| No. | Pos. | Player | Booked | (yellow card) (yellow-red card) | Sent off (straight red) | Booked | (yellow card) (yellow-red card) | Sent off (straight red) | Booked | (yellow card) (yellow-red card) | Sent off (straight red) |
|---|---|---|---|---|---|---|---|---|---|---|---|
| 1 | GK | (China) Cheng Yuelei | 2 | 0 | 0 | 0 | 0 | 0 | 2 | 0 | 0 |
| 4 | MF | (China) Zhang Gong | 3 | 0 | 0 | 0 | 0 | 0 | 3 | 0 | 0 |
| 5 | DF | (Iceland) Sölvi Ottesen | 1 | 1 | 0 | 0 | 0 | 0 | 1 | 1 | 0 |
| 7 | FW | (Israel) Eran Zahavi | 3 | 0 | 0 | 0 | 0 | 0 | 3 | 0 | 0 |
| 8 | MF | (Brazil) Júnior Urso | 3 | 0 | 0 | 1 | 0 | 0 | 4 | 0 | 0 |
| 10 | MF | (Brazil) Renatinho | 6 | 0 | 0 | 0 | 0 | 0 | 6 | 0 | 0 |
| 11 | DF | (China) Jiang Zhipeng | 4 | 0 | 0 | 1 | 0 | 0 | 5 | 0 | 0 |
| 13 | FW | (China) Ye Chugui | 2 | 0 | 0 | 0 | 0 | 0 | 2 | 0 | 0 |
| 14 | MF | (China) Zeng Chao | 1 | 0 | 0 | 0 | 0 | 0 | 1 | 0 | 0 |
| 17 | DF | (China) Zhang Chenlong | 3 | 0 | 0 | 1 | 0 | 0 | 4 | 0 | 0 |
| 18 | DF | (China) Yi Teng | 2 | 0 | 0 | 0 | 0 | 0 | 2 | 0 | 0 |
| 19 | DF | (China) Jiang Jihong | 6 | 0 | 0 | 0 | 0 | 0 | 6 | 0 | 0 |
| 20 | DF | (China) Tang Miao | 3 | 0 | 0 | 0 | 0 | 0 | 3 | 0 | 0 |
| 23 | MF | (China) Lu Lin | 2 | 0 | 0 | 1 | 0 | 0 | 3 | 0 | 0 |
| 29 | FW | (China) Xiao Zhi | 3 | 0 | 0 | 0 | 0 | 0 | 3 | 0 | 0 |
| 30 | DF | (China) Fu Yunlong | 1 | 0 | 0 | 0 | 0 | 0 | 1 | 0 | 0 |
| 32 | MF | (China) Chen Zhizhao | 5 | 0 | 0 | 2 | 1 | 0 | 7 | 1 | 0 |
| 35 | MF | (China) Li Tixiang | 2 | 0 | 1 | 2 | 0 | 0 | 4 | 0 | 1 |
| 36 | DF | (China) Huang Zhengyu | 3 | 0 | 0 | 0 | 0 | 0 | 3 | 0 | 0 |
| TOTALS | | | 55 | 1 | 1 | 8 | 1 | 0 | 63 | 2 | 1 |
