= 2016 Guangzhou R&F F.C. season =

Guangzhou R&F 2016
- Chairman: Zhang Li (张力)
- Manager: Dragan Stojković
- Stadium: Yuexiushan Stadium
- Super League: 6th
- FA Cup: Semi-finals
- Top goalscorer: League: Eran Zahavi (11); All: Eran Zahavi (17)
- Average home league attendance: 9,831
Home colours	Away colours

The 2016 Guangzhou R&F season is the 6th year in Guangzhou R&F's existence and its 5th season in the Chinese football league, also its 6th season in the top flight.

== Coaching and medical staff ==
Position	Staff
Head coach	(Serbia) Dragan Stojković
Assistant coaches	(Serbia) Žarko Đurović
Assistant coaches	(Serbia) Dejan Govedarica
Fitness coach	(Japan) Katsuhito Kinoshi
Goalkeeper coach	(China) Huang Hongtao
Team leader	(China) Huang Jun
Team physicians	(Canada) Jin Ri
Team physicians	(China) Fan Bihua
Physiotherapist	(Spain) Enrique Pascual Muñoz
Performance manager	(United States) Bito Wu
Interpreters	(China) Hong Wenjie
Interpreters	(China) Weng Zhanhong
Interpreters	(China) Piao Jun

Source: Guangzhou R&F F.C.

== Squad ==
=== Winter ===
As of 1 March 2016.

Note: Flags indicate national team as defined under FIFA eligibility rules; some limited exceptions apply. Players may hold more than one non-FIFA nationality.

No.	Pos.	Nation	Player
1	GK	CHN	Cheng Yuelei
3	DF	CHN	Yu Yang
5	DF	CHN	Zhang Yaokun (captain)
6	DF	CHN	Yang Ting
7	MF	SWE	Gustav Svensson
8	MF	CHN	Wang Xiaolong
9	FW	AUS	Apostolos Giannou
10	FW	BRA	Bruninho
11	MF	CHN	Jiang Zhipeng
13	MF	CHN	Ye Chugui
14	DF	CHN	Zeng Chao
15	MF	CHN	Ning An
16	GK	CHN	Pei Chensong
17	DF	CHN	Zhang Chenlong
18	GK	CHN	Zhang Shichang

No.	Pos.	Nation	Player
20	MF	CHN	Tang Miao
21	FW	CHN	Chang Feiya
22	DF	KOR	Jang Hyun-Soo
23	MF	CHN	Lu Lin
26	DF	CHN	Xiang Jiachi
27	MF	CHN	Hou Junjie
28	MF	CHN	Wang Jia'nan
29	FW	CHN	Xiao Zhi
30	DF	CHN	Fu Yunlong
31	MF	BRA	Renatinho
32	MF	CHN	Chen Zhizhao
33	MF	CHN	Wang Song
35	FW	CHN	Min Junlin
36	MF	CHN	Huang Zhengyu
37	MF	CHN	Li Yuyang

=== Summer ===
As of 4 September 2016.

Note: Flags indicate national team as defined under FIFA eligibility rules; some limited exceptions apply. Players may hold more than one non-FIFA nationality.

No.	Pos.	Nation	Player
1	GK	CHN	Cheng Yuelei
3	DF	CHN	Yu Yang
5	DF	CHN	Zhang Yaokun (captain)
7	MF	SWE	Gustav Svensson
8	MF	CHN	Wang Xiaolong
9	FW	AUS	Apostolos Giannou
11	MF	CHN	Jiang Zhipeng
13	MF	CHN	Ye Chugui
14	FW	CHN	Zeng Chao
15	MF	CHN	Ning An
16	GK	CHN	Pei Chensong
17	DF	CHN	Zhang Chenlong
19	GK	CHN	Han Feng
20	MF	CHN	Tang Miao

No.	Pos.	Nation	Player
21	FW	CHN	Chang Feiya
22	DF	KOR	Jang Hyun-Soo
23	MF	CHN	Lu Lin
25	MF	ISR	Eran Zahavi
29	FW	CHN	Xiao Zhi
31	MF	BRA	Renatinho
32	MF	CHN	Chen Zhizhao
33	MF	CHN	Wang Song
36	DF	CHN	Huang Zhengyu
43	MF	CHN	Zhao Keda
49	MF	CHN	Chen Fuhai
53	FW	CHN	Zhang Jiajie
59	DF	CHN	Chen Weiming

== Competitions ==
Win Draw Loss

=== Chinese Super League ===
==== Table ====
Pos	Team	Pld	W	D	L	GF	GA	GD	Pts	Qualification or relegation
4	Shanghai Greenland Shenhua (Note: Shanghai Greenland Shenhua qualified for the 2017 AFC Champions League qualifying play-offs round as Guangzhou Evergrande Taobao and Jiangsu Suning are 2016 Chinese FA Cup finalists.)	30	12	12	6	46	31	+15	48	Qualification to Champions League play-off round
5	Beijing Guoan	30	11	10	9	34	26	+8	43	
6	Guangzhou R&F	30	11	7	12	47	50	−3	40	
7	Hebei China Fortune	30	11	7	12	34	38	−4	40	
8	Chongqing Lifan	30	9	10	11	43	50	−7	37	

Source: Sina Sports
Rules for classification: 1) Points; 2) Head-to-head points; 3) Head-to-head goal difference; 4) Head-to-head goals scored; 5) Reserve league points; 6) Goal difference; 7) Goals scored; 8) Disciplinary points (1 point for each yellow card, 3 points for each red card)

==== Results by round ====
Round	1	2	3	4	5	6	7	8	9	10	11	12	13	14	15	16	17	18	19	20	21	22	23	24	25	26	27	28	29	30
Ground	H	A	A	H	A	H	A	H	A	H	A	A																		
Result	L	W	L	D	L	D	W	W	L	L	L	W																		
Position	11	6	10	12	15	15	9	7	8	8	10	9																		

A = Away; H = Home; W = Win; D = Draw; L = Loss

==== Results summary ====
Overall								Home						Away					
Pld	W	D	L	GF	GA	GD	Pts	W	D	L	GF	GA	GD	W	D	L	GF	GA	GD
2	1	0	1	2	2	0	3	1	0	0	1	0	+1	0	0	1	1	2	−1

Last updated: 23 March 2016.
Source: Competitive Matches

==== League matches ====
4 March 2016 1	Guangzhou R&F	1 - 2	Hebei China Fortune	Guangzhou
19:35 UTC+8	Gülüm 11' (o.g.); Chen Zhizhao (yellow card) 64'; Chen Zhizhao (yellow card) 90+3' (yellow-red card)		Luo Senwen (yellow card) 10'; Gülüm 28'; Gervinho 40'; Luo Senwen (yellow card) 43' (yellow-red card); Liao Junjian (yellow card) 90+4'	Stadium: Yuexiushan Stadium; Attendance: 9,889; Referee: Fu Ming; Assistant referees: Cao Yi, Ma Ji; Fourth official: Ai Kun

12 March 2016 2	Tianjin Teda Elion	0 - 1	Guangzhou R&F	Tianjin
19:35 UTC+8	Li Benjian (yellow card) 54'; Hu Rentian (yellow card) 88'		Wang Song 57'	Stadium: Tianjin Olympic Center Stadium; Attendance: 28,736; Referee: Wang Di; Assistant referees: Fei Zhou, Xu Jun; Fourth official: Shen Yinhao

1 April 2016 3	Guangzhou Evergrande Taobao	2 - 0	Guangzhou R&F	Guangzhou
19:35 UTC+8	Giannou (yellow card) 90'		Paulinho 30'; Xu Xin (yellow card) 74'; Martínez 80'; Rong Hao (yellow card) 85'	Stadium: Tianhe Stadium; Attendance: 46,993; Referee: Tan Hai; Assistant referees: Tong Yong, Lou Fangping; Fourth official: Huang Yejun

8 April 2016 4	Guangzhou R&F	0 - 0	Yanbian Funde	Guangzhou
19:35 UTC+8	Chang Feiya (yellow card) 35'; Wang Jianan (yellow card) 49'; Jang Hyun-Soo (yellow card) 89'			Stadium: Yuexiushan Stadium; Attendance: 12,103; Referee: Gu Chunhan; Assistant referees: Ma Ji, Zhou Guang; Fourth official: Zhang Lei

15 April 2016 5	Shanghai SIPG	1 - 0	Guangzhou R&F	Shanghai
15:30 UTC+8	Svensson 85' (o.g.)			Stadium: Shanghai Stadium; Attendance: 20,009; Referee: Lin Jun; Assistant referees: Wang Dexin, Li Yang; Fourth official: Lin Liu

23 April 2016 6	Guangzhou R&F	1 - 1	Jiangsu Suning	Guangzhou
15:30 UTC+8	Xiao Zhi (yellow card) 81'; Zeng Chao 82'		Ji Xiang (yellow card) 43'; Wu Xi (yellow card) 66'; Jô 90+2' (pen.)	Stadium: Yuexiushan Stadium; Attendance: 10,978; Referee: Lin Liu; Assistant referees: Song Xiangyun, Wen Xiaofang; Fourth official: Tan Hai

29 April 2016 7	Shandong Luneng Taishan	2 - 3	Guangzhou R&F	Jinan
17:35 UTC+8	Dai Lin 28'; Dai Lin (yellow card) 49'; Wang Yongpo 52'		Tang Miao (yellow card) 24'; Lu Lin 26', 63'; Xiao Zhi 62'; Wang Song (yellow card) 90+5'	Stadium: Jinan Olympic Sports Center Stadium; Attendance: 16,327; Referee: Zhou Gang; Assistant referees: Yu Yue, Li Yang; Fourth official: Gu Chunhan

7 May 2016 8	Guangzhou R&F	2 - 0	Chongqing Lifan	Guangzhou
19:35 UTC+8	Tang Miao 39'; Xiao Zhi 54'		Peng Xinli (yellow card) 35'; Liu Yu (yellow card) 38'; Sui Donglu (yellow card) 88'	Stadium: Yuexiushan Stadium; Attendance: 9,122; Referee: Dong Kun; Assistant referees: Ma Yi, Cao Yi; Fourth official: Zhou Gang

15 May 2016 9	Shanghai Greenland Shenhua	5 - 1	Guangzhou R&F	Shanghai
17:35 UTC+8	Lü Sheng 5'; Li Janbian (yellow card) 21'; Qin Sheng (yellow card) 53'; Li Yunqiu (yellow card) 61'; Moreno 66'; Cao Yunding 76'; Ba 84'; Martins 86'; Li Janbian (yellow card) 89' (yellow-red card)		Xiao Zhi 11'; Svensson (yellow card) 31'; Bruninho (yellow card) 45+1'	Stadium: Hongkou Stadium; Attendance: 19,692; Referee: Zhao Zhizhi; Assistant referees: Qinqung Liu, Wu Huifeng; Fourth official: Ma Li

22 May 2016 10	Guangzhou R&F	0 - 1	Changchun Yatai	Guangzhou
15:30 UTC+8			Moreno 74'; Moreno (yellow card) 81'; Wu Yake (yellow card) 85'	Stadium: Yuexiushan Stadium; Attendance: 10,706; Referee: Zhang Lei; Assistant referees: Zhang Cheng, Yu Yue; Fourth official: Jianxun Kou

28 May 2016 11	Henan Jianye	1 - 0	Guangzhou R&F	Zhengzhou
17:35 UTC+8	Patiño 13'; Liang Yu (yellow card) 90'		Wang Xiaolong (yellow card)	Stadium: Zhengzhou Hanghai Stadium; Attendance: 19,359; Referee: Ma Li; Assistant referees: Song Xiangyun, Wen Xiaofang; Fourth official: Wang Zhe

11 June 2016 12	Hangzhou Greentown	0 - 1	Guangzhou R&F	Hangzhou
16:00 UTC+8	Zang Yifeng (yellow card) 22'; Denilson Gabionetta (yellow card) 44'; Cao Haiqing (yellow card) 49'; Oh Beom-seok (yellow card) 58'		Jiang Zhipeng (red card) 21'; Xiao Zhi (yellow card) 35'; Renatinho 42'	Stadium: Yellow Dragon Sports Center; Attendance: 5,135; Referee: Ma Ning; Assistant referees: Zhou Guangya, Hu Chengjun; Fourth official: Xia Jun

15 June 2016 21	Jiangsu Suning	1 - 1	Guangzhou R&F	Nanjing
19:35 UTC+8	Ji Xiang (yellow card) 43'; Teixeira 79'		Xiao Zhi (yellow card) 29'; Giannou 75'	Stadium: Nanjing Olympic Sports Center; Attendance: 28,923; Referee: Zhang Long; Assistant referees: Cao Yi, Yu Yue; Fourth official: Lin Jun

19 June 2016 13	Guangzhou R&F	1 - 1	Beijing Guoan	Guangzhou
15:30 UTC+8	Giannou 45'		Piao Cheng 26'; Lei Tenglong (yellow card) 64'	Stadium: Yuexiushan Stadium; Attendance: 9,876; Referee: Shi Zhenlu; Assistant referees: Wang Deixin, Wen Xiaofang; Fourth official: Pan Li

26 June 2016 14	Liaoning Whowin	3 - 1	Guangzhou R&F	Shenyang
15:00 UTC+8	Chamanga 33' (pen.), 74'; Zheng Tao (yellow card) 37'; Hu Yanqiang (yellow card) 40'; Assani Lukimya 54'; Ni Yusong (yellow card) 82'		Giannou (yellow card) 36'; Yu Yang (red card) 52'; Zeng Chao 90'	Stadium: Tiexi New District Sports Center; Attendance: 20,137; Referee: Zhao Zhizhi; Assistant referees: Yu Yue, Zhang Hongwei; Fourth official: Qi Xing

=== Chinese FA Cup ===
10 May 2016 Third Round	Hainan Boying & Seamen	1 - 1 (3 - 4 p)	Guangzhou R&F	Haikou
16:30 UTC+8	Wang Qi 73'		Tang Miao 90'	Stadium: Hainan Sport School Stadium; Referee: Liu Xiufeng
	Penalties
	Pan Chaoran (penalty scored); Zhang Kaiming (penalty scored); Wang Haoyi (penalty missed); Jiang Weipeng (penalty scored); Li Xincheng (penalty missed)		(penalty scored) Zhang Chenlong; (penalty scored) Wang Song; (penalty scored) Lu Lin; (penalty missed) Chen Zhizhao; (penalty scored) Xiao Zhi

29 June 2016 Fourth Round	Guangzhou R&F	1 - 0	Shanghai SIPG	Guangzhou
19:35 UTC+8	Giannou 62'			Stadium: Yuexiushan Stadium; Attendance: 7,086; Referee: Wang Jing

13 July 2016 Fifth Round 1st Leg	Guangzhou R&F	3 - 0	Hebei China Fortune	Guangzhou
19:00 UTC+8	Zahavi 61', 78', 81' (pen.)			Stadium: Yuexiushan Stadium; Attendance: 7,033; Referee: Tan Hai

27 July 2016 Fifth Round 2nd Leg	Hebei China Fortune	1 - 2	Guangzhou R&F	Qinhuangdao
19:35 UTC+8	Mbia 89' (pen.)		Zahavi 43' (pen.); Lu Lin 83'	Stadium: Qinhuangdao Olympic Sports Center Stadium; Attendance: 5,317; Referee: Ai Kun

17 August 2016 Semi-finals 1st Leg	Guangzhou Evergrande Taobao	2 - 2	Guangzhou R&F	Guangzhou
19:35 UTC+8	Goulart 27', 89'; Gao Lin (yellow card) 43'		Xiao Zhi 21'; Renatinho (yellow card) 38'; Zahavi 51'; Zahavi (yellow card) 51'	Stadium: Tianhe Stadium; Attendance: 33,849; Referee: Ai Kun; Assistant referees: Cao Yi, Ma Ji; Fourth official: Zhang Lei

21 September 2016 Semi-finals 2nd Leg	Guangzhou R&F	1 - 3 (3 - 5 agg.)	Guangzhou Evergrande Taobao	Guangzhou
19:35 UTC+8	Tang Miao (yellow card) 67'; Zhang Yaokun (yellow card) 81'; Zahavi 85'		Paulinho 9'; Feng Xiaoting (yellow card) 58'; Goulart 67' (pen.); Alan 70'	Stadium: Yuexiushan Stadium; Attendance: 13,989; Referee: Zhao Zhizhi; Assistant referees: Song Xiangyun, Xu Xianghui; Fourth official: Fan Qi
