= Yi Teng =

Chinese footballer

Yi Teng 弋腾
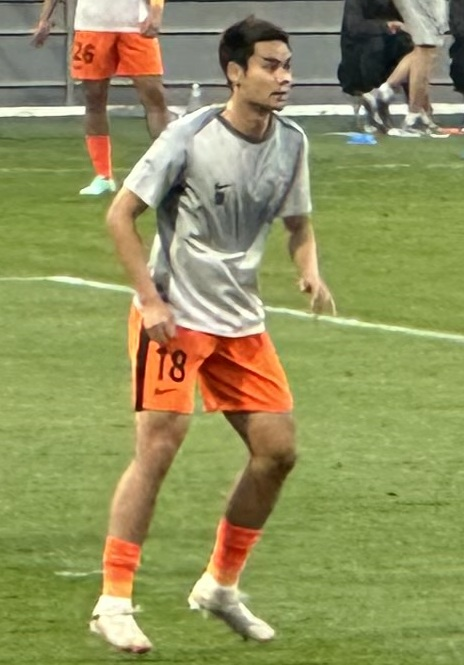
- Yi Teng in May 2025

Personal information
- Full name: Yi Teng
- Date of birth: 22 February 1990 (age 36)
- Place of birth: Guiyang, Guizhou, China
- Height: 1.90 m (6 ft 3 in)
- Position: Centre-back

Team information
- Current team: Yunnan Yukun
- Number: 18

Youth career
- 2003–2005: Chongqing Lifan
- 2005–2008: Chengdu Blades
- 2008–2010: FC Metz

Senior career*
Years	Team	Apps	(Gls)
2010–2011	FC Metz	0	(0)
2010–2011	FC Metz B	23	(0)
2011–2012	Shenzhen Ruby	36	(0)
2013–2016	Guangzhou Evergrande	5	(0)
2014	→ Liaoning Whowin (loan)	18	(0)
2015	→ Hangzhou Greentown (loan)	7	(0)
2016	→ Beijing Renhe (loan)	29	(0)
2017–2022	Guangzhou City	139	(3)
2023	Changchun Yatai	19	(0)
2024–	Yunnan Yukun	62	(1)
- * Club domestic league appearances and goals as of 19 November 2026

Yi Teng (Chinese: 弋腾; pinyin: Yì Téng; Mandarin pronunciation: [î tʰə̌ŋ]; born 22 February 1990) is a Chinese footballer who currently plays as a centre-back for Yunnan Yukun in the Chinese Super League.

== Club career ==
Yi Teng started his football career by signing with Chongqing Lifan's youth academy in 2003. After two years playing for Chongqing's youth academy, Yi joined Chengdu Blades's youth system in 2005 for further development. On 23 October 2009, he officially transferred to Ligue 2 side FC Metz after a brief and successful trial period. He became the second Chinese footballer to be signed a French side after Li Jinyu who played for AS Nancy in 1998. Yi was promoted to the first team squad in the 2010–11 season, but failed to make an impact and did not play at all for the entire season.

In July 2011, Yi signed a contract with Chinese Super League side Shenzhen Ruby. On 21 August 2011, he made his debut for the club in a 4–2 win against Dalian Shide, coming on as a substitute for Liu Chao in the 82nd minute. Yi was named as club captain by then manager Philippe Troussier in 2012 after Shenzhen was relegated to the second tier.

On 1 January 2013, along with Zhao Peng and Zeng Cheng, Yi transferred to Chinese Super League giant Guangzhou Evergrande for a fee of ¥10 million. On 10 July 2013, he made his debut for Guangzhou Evergrande in the fourth round of 2013 Chinese FA Cup in which Guangzhou beat Dalian Ruilong 7–1. He then made his league debut for Guangzhou on 25 August 2013, as a substitute for Elkeson in the final minutes of a league game against Guangzhou R&F.

On 10 February 2014, Yi moved to fellow top-tier club Liaoning Whowin on a one-year loan deal. He made his debut for the club in a 1–1 draw against Shanghai East Asia on 9 March 2014. On 18 June 2015, he was loaned out again to another top-tier side Hangzhou Greentown, rejoining former manager Philippe Troussier. He made his debut for Hangzhou on 28 June 2015 in a 2–0 loss against Guangzhou R&F. In January 2016, he was loaned to China League One club Beijing Renhe. On 12 February 2016, Yi was sold to Guangzhou R&F as part of Liu Dianzuo's transfer deal. He would join Guangzhou R&F in 2017 after his return from Beijing Renhe. He made his debut for Beijing on 13 March 2016, in a 0–0 away draw against Hunan Billows.

Guangzhou R&F (now known as Guangzhou City) officially announced Yi's transfer on 29 December 2016. He signed a three-year contract with the club. He made his debut for the club on 4 March 2017 in a 2–0 home win against Tianjin Quanjian. On 10 September 2017, he scored his first senior goal in a 2–1 away defeat to Hebei China Fortune. He scored another goal of the season on 4 November 2017 in a 2–0 home win over Chongqing Dangdai Lifan. Yi was promoted as the team captain in the 2018 season after Jiang Zhipeng's transfer. He extended his contract again until the end of 2022 season on 25 April 2018.

On 7 April 2023, Yi was free to transfer to fellow top-tier club Changchun Yatai for the start of the 2023 Chinese Super League season.

== Career statistics ==
As of 31 December 2022.

Appearances and goals by club, season and competition
Club	Season	League			National Cup		League Cup		Continental		Other		Total	
Club	Season	Division	Apps	Goals	Apps	Goals	Apps	Goals	Apps	Goals	Apps	Goals	Apps	Goals
FC Metz	2010–11	Ligue 2	0	0	0	0	0	0	-		-		0	0
FC Metz B	2010–11	Championnat de France Amateur	23	0	0	0	0	0	-		-		23	0
Shenzhen Ruby	2011	Chinese Super League	11	0	0	0	-		-		-		11	0
Shenzhen Ruby	2012	China League One	25	0	1	0	-		-		-		26	0
Shenzhen Ruby	Total		36	0	1	0	0	0	0	0	0	0	37	0
Guangzhou Evergrande	2013	Chinese Super League	4	0	2	0	-		0	0	0 (Note: Appearances in Chinese FA Super Cup, Appearances in FIFA Club World Cup)	0	6	0
Guangzhou Evergrande	2015	Chinese Super League	1	0	1	0	-		0	0	0 (Note: Appearances in Chinese FA Super Cup)	0	2	0
Guangzhou Evergrande	Total		5	0	3	0	0	0	0	0	0	0	8	0
Liaoning FC (loan)	2014	Chinese Super League	18	0	1	0	-		-		-		19	0
Hangzhou Greentown (loan)	2015	Chinese Super League	7	0	0	0	-		-		-		7	0
Beijing Renhe (loan)	2016	China League One	29	0	0	0	-		-		-		29	0
Guangzhou R&F/ Guangzhou City	2017	Chinese Super League	23	2	3	0	-		-		-		26	2
Guangzhou R&F/ Guangzhou City	2018	Chinese Super League	27	0	6	0	-		-		-		33	0
Guangzhou R&F/ Guangzhou City	2019	Chinese Super League	28	1	0	0	-		-		-		28	1
Guangzhou R&F/ Guangzhou City	2020	Chinese Super League	17	0	2	0	-		-		-		19	0
Guangzhou R&F/ Guangzhou City	2021	Chinese Super League	15	0	2	0	-		-		-		15	0
Guangzhou R&F/ Guangzhou City	2022	Chinese Super League	29	0	2	0	-		-		-		29	0
Guangzhou R&F/ Guangzhou City	Total		139	3	11	0	0	0	0	0	0	0	150	3
Changchun Yatai	2023	Chinese Super League	0	0	0	0	-		-		-		0	0
Career total			257	3	16	0	0	0	0	0	0	0	273	3

== Honours ==
=== Club ===
Guangzhou Evergrande

- Chinese Super League: 2013
- AFC Champions League: 2013

Sporting positions
Preceded by Jiang Zhipeng	Guangzhou R&F F.C. captain 2018-2023	Succeeded by Incumbent
