= Apostolos Giannou =

Association football player (born 1990)

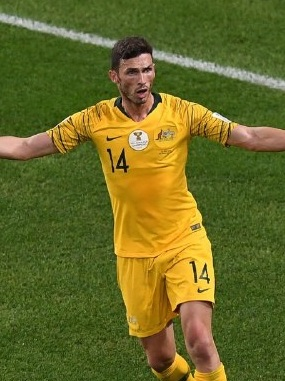
- Giannou playing for Australia at the 2019 AFC Asian Cup

Personal information
- Date of birth: 25 January 1990 (age 36)
- Place of birth: Naousa, Greece
- Height: 1.85 m (6 ft 1 in)
- Position: Forward

Youth career
- 2003–2004: Oakleigh Cannons
- 2004–2005: South Melbourne
- 2005–2006: VIS

Senior career*
Years	Team	Apps	(Gls)
2007	Oakleigh Cannons	7	(1)
2007–2009	Apollon Kalamarias	29	(6)
2009–2011	Kavala	14	(2)
2011–2013	PAOK	26	(3)
2013	→ Platanias (loan)	9	(1)
2013–2015	Panionios	60	(13)
2015–2016	Asteras Tripolis	21	(13)
2016–2018	Guangzhou R&F	29	(7)
2018–2020	AEK Larnaca	54	(7)
2020–2022	OFI	17	(0)
2022	Macarthur	20	(3)
2022–2023	Kerala Blasters	17	(2)
2024	Ilioupoli	11	(1)
2024–2025	Achyronas-Onisilos	25	(5)

International career^{‡}
2006	Australia U17	8	(2)
2008–2009	Greece U19	7	(0)
2010–2012	Greece U21	13	(2)
2015	Greece	1	(0)
2016–2019	Australia	12	(2)
- * Club domestic league appearances and goals as of 26 June 2025 ‡ National team caps and goals as of 23:36, 10 October 2019 (UTC)

Apostolos Giannou (Greek: Απόστολος Γιάννου; born 25 January 1990) is a professional footballer who plays as a forward. Born in Greece, he represented various Greek and Australian youth national teams, including one friendly with the Greece national team, before appearing competitively for the Australia national team.

== Club career ==
=== Early life and career ===
Giannou was born in Naousa, Greece, but moved to Australia at a young age and grew up in Melbourne. In Australia he was known as Paul.

Giannou played junior football for Oakleigh Cannons and South Melbourne. Following state representative honours at under-14 and under-15 level, Giannou was selected for the VIS by Ernie Merrick. At the Victorian Institute of Sport, he trained alongside Andreas Govas, Matthew Spiranovic, Adrian Leijer, Leigh Broxham, Milos Lujic, Dimitri Hatzimouratis and Matthew Theodore.

He took part in Melbourne Victory's pre-season friendlies prior to the 2006–07 A-League season with an intention of being signed in an apprenticeship capacity. However, Giannou secured a two-week trial with PSV Eindhoven's Reserve and Academy teams. Giannou was assured that if he did not sign with the Dutch club, he could return to Melbourne Victory. Despite the unsuccessful trial, Giannou came back to Melbourne and signed a six-month contract with Victorian Premier League side Oakleigh Cannons.

=== Apollon Kalamarias ===
On 2007, Giannou was transferred to Greek first division side Apollon Kalamarias. Giannou netted his first goal for Apollon Kalamarias in late 2008, an 81st minute consolation goal in a 3–1 defeat at home to Kerkyra. Giannou would go on to score 5 more times in the 2008–09 Beta Ethniki season before being transferred to Kavala, who had gained promotion to Super League Greece for the 2009–10 season, on a five-year contract.

=== Kavala ===
On 21 November 2009 Giannou debuted for Kavala where he was substituted on after 79 minutes, after being played through on goal Giannou neatly passed the ball into the back of the net on the 88th minute mark to seal a 2–1 victory against AEK Athens. Down the track, Giannou was one of five Australians in the Greek side as the club welcomed the arrivals of Robert Stambolziev, Zeljko Kalac, Andreas Govas and Craig Moore.

=== PAOK ===
After the relegation of Kavala, Zisis Vryzas had brought him to PAOK and Giannou was set free and on 30 September 2011 signed a three-year contract with PAOK He made his first appearance for the club during the 2011–12 season in a 0–0 draw against OFI on 16 October, where he was substituted onto the field for Vladimir Ivic in the 78th minute. Giannou scored his first goals for the club, a brace, in a 2–0 away victory against OFI on 11 February.

=== Panionios ===
On 2 September 2013 Panionios proceeded to a significant addition to its roster, by announcing the acquisition of Giannou. The 23-year-old striker was released by PAOK, as it was not in the plans of Huub Stevens, but did not stay for long time as unemployed and immediately signing a two-years' contract with the club.

=== Asteras Tripolis ===
On 9 June 2015, Giannou signed a three years' contract with Asteras Tripolis for an undisclosed fee. He scored on his debut against Panthrakikos F.C. he also scored 2 matchdays later a penalty against Kaloni F.C. On 27 September 2015, on the 5th day of the 2015–16 season he scored in a 2–1 away loss against Levadiakos. On 5 October 2015, he scored the only goal of his club in a 1–1 home draw against Platanias F.C. On 25 October 2015, after three consecutive unsuccessful results, he scored twice, one with a penalty-kick in the 2–1 away win against PAS Giannina. He was named man of the match. On 5 November 2015, Asteras Tripolis ended a run of seven European games without a win to breathe life into their flagging group campaign, by winning APOEL. Giannou scored the second goal in a 2–0 home win in the extra time of first half after Pablo Mazza's assist. It was his first goal in UEFA campaigns. On 29 November 2015, was anointed scorer with a second attempt after the successful repulse of the penalty from Roberto in overtime in a 3–1 away loss against Greek champions Olympiakos. On 5 December 2015, he scored the only goal in the 2–1 home loss against Iraklis, that keeping the unbeaten tradition against Asteras Tripolis. On 2 January 2016, he scored twice to a comfortable 4–0 home win against Panthrakikos. With these goals, he scored his eleventh goal in this year's season setting a new personal season's scoring record after last year's 10 goals with Panionios.

On 20 February 2016, the Chinese club Shanghai Shenhua offer more than €2 million to buy 26-year-old striker of Asteras Tripolis. The Greek club ask for at least €3 million to sell its first scorer, who can not be replaced with a transfer until summer, while Giannou seems to have already agreed terms with the team of his compatriot, Avraam Papadopoulos, which offers him more than €1 million for every year of contract.

=== Guangzhou R&F ===
On 24 February 2016, Giannou has agreed to continue his career at the Chinese club Guangzhou R&F instead of Shanghai Shenhua. Asteras Tripolis have accepted a bid of €2.5 million for the Greek striker who is heading to China to undergo medical and complete his move. Giannou has agreed terms with Guangzhou with a lucrative three years' contract of €1.6 million yearly.

=== AEK Larnaca ===
On 25 January 2018, Guangzhou R&F confirmed that Giannou joined AEK Larnaca.

=== OFI ===
On 22 September 2020, Giannou after leaving AEK Larnaca, has decided to continue his career in Greece, signing a two-years deal with OFI, for an undisclosed fee.

=== Macarthur FC ===
On 13 January 2022, Giannou after leaving OFI, has decided to continue his career in Australia, signing a deal with Macarthur FC, for an undisclosed fee.

=== Kerala Blasters ===
On 8 July 2022, Indian Super League club Kerala Blasters announced Giannou as the club's first foreign signing ahead of the 2022–23 season. Giannou's Indian Super League debut with the Blasters came on 7 October 2022 in a 3–1 win against East Bengal on the opening day of the 2022–23 season. He scored his first goal for the club on 11 December against their southern rivals Bengaluru FC, where he scored the third goal for the Blasters within two minutes after coming as a substitute in the 68th minute as the Blasters won the match 3–2 at full-time. He scored his second goal of the season against Jamshedpur FC on 3 January 2023, where he scored the first goal for the Blasters from a backheel flick in the 9th minute and helped the Blasters to win the match 3–1 at home. Later the season, Giannou was included in the Blasters' squad for the 2023 Indian Super Cup, and made his cup debut for the Blasters in the 3–1 victory against RoundGlass Punjab FC on 8 April 2023.

== International career ==
In 2006, Giannou represented Australia U17 at the AFC U-17 Championship 2006 Qualification. Giannou scored in Australia's 3–1 win against Indonesia. Giannou was the only Victorian player selected for Australia's under-17 side that took part in the International Youth Football tournament in Niigata, Japan. The team finished top of their respective group as Giannou scored a goal in a 5–1 win against Albirex Niigata.

In July 2008, Giannou was listed in a group of Australian footballers aged between 16 and 22 known as "the lost boys", including Dean Bouzanis, Andreas Govas and Robert Stambolziev, who were likely to play for or had played for national teams of the country of their heritage.

In 2008, Giannou represented Greece U19 at the 2008 UEFA European Under-19 Football Championship elite qualification where Greece qualified for the Championship finals, he played alongside Australian Dean Bouzanis. Under coach Alexis Alexiou, Giannou appeared twice at the European Under-19 Championships when he was substituted on in a 1–1 draw against Italy and started in a 3–0 loss against England as Greece finished at the bottom of their group.

On 5 September 2010, Giannou returned to the international stage after two years' absence, he was selected for Greece U21 for a 2011 European Under-21 Championship qualifier against the Macedonia which Greece won 2–1.

On 24 March 2015, Giannou was selected but did not appear for the Greece national team for the UEFA Euro 2016 qualifying match against Hungary.

On 5 November 2015, Giannou was selected but did not appear for the Greece national team for the friendly matches against Luxembourg and Turkey. On 17 November, he made his debut appearance with Greece as a late substitute for Kostas Mitroglou in a 0–0 away draw against Turkey.

He was capped by Greece, on 25 February 2016, but Giannou declared his intent to play for Australia.

Giannou was called up for Australia for the 2018 World Cup qualifiers against Tajikistan and Jordan on 9 March 2016. Giannou made his debut for Australia in a 7–0 win against Tajikistan on 24 March 2016. He assisted Massimo Luongo for Australia's first goal of the match, and won two penalties for Australia, which were converted by Mile Jedinak and Mark Milligan for Australia's second and third goals.

== Career statistics ==
=== Club ===
As of match played 12 April 2023

Appearances and goals by club, season and competition
Club	Season	League			National cup (Note: Includes Greek Cup, Chinese FA Cup, Cypriot Cup, Indian Super Cup)		Continental		Total	
Club	Season	Division	Apps	Goals	Apps	Goals	Apps	Goals	Apps	Goals
Oakleigh Cannons	2007	Victorian Premier League	7	1	0	0	–		7	1
Apollon Kalamarias	2007–08	Super League Greece	8	0	0	0	–		8	0
Apollon Kalamarias	2008–09	Super League Greece 2	21	6	0	0	–		21	6
Apollon Kalamarias	Total		29	6	0	0	0	0	29	6
Kavala	2009–10	Super League Greece	5	1	1	0	–		6	1
Kavala	2010–11	Super League Greece	9	0	1	0	–		10	0
Kavala	Total		14	1	2	0	0	0	16	1
PAOK	2011–12	Super League Greece	15	2	0	0	2 (Note: Appearances in UEFA Europa League)	0	17	2
PAOK	2012–13	Super League Greece	11	1	3	2	3	0	17	3
PAOK	Total		26	3	3	2	5	0	34	5
Platanias (loan)	2012–13	Super League Greece	9	1	1	0	–		10	1
Panionios	2013–14	Super League Greece	28	3	5	1	–		33	4
Panionios	2014–15	Super League Greece	32	10	6	2	–		38	12
Panionios	Total		60	13	11	3	0	0	71	16
Asteras Tripolis	2015–16	Super League Greece	21	13	3	0	6	1	30	14
Guangzhou R&F	2016	Chinese Super League	22	5	3	1	–		25	6
Guangzhou R&F	2017	Chinese Super League	7	2	0	0	–		7	2
Guangzhou R&F	Total		29	7	3	1	0	0	32	8
AEK Larnaca	2017–18	Cypriot First Division	11	2	6	3	0	0	17	5
AEK Larnaca	2018–19	Cypriot First Division	24	4	3	1	12	3	39	8
AEK Larnaca	2019–20	Cypriot First Division	19	1	3	0	6	1	28	2
AEK Larnaca	Total		54	7	12	4	18	4	84	15
OFI	2020–21	Super League Greece	15	0	0	0	–		15	0
OFI	2021–22	Super League Greece	2	0	2	0	–		4	0
OFI	Total		17	0	2	0	0	0	19	0
Macarthur	2021–22	A-League Men	20	3	0	0	0	0	20	3
Kerala Blasters	2022–23	Indian Super League	17	2	2	0	—		19	2
Career total			296	55	39	10	29	5	372	71

=== International ===
As of match played on 10 September 2019

Appearances and goals by national team and year
National team	Year	Apps	Goals
Greece	2015	1	0
Total		1	0
Australia	2016	5	0
Australia	2017	0	0
Australia	2018	1	1
Australia	2019	6	1
Total		12	2

Scores and results list Australia's goal tally first, score column indicates score after each Giannou goal.

List of international goals scored by Apostolos Giannou
No.	Date	Venue	Opponent	Score	Result	Competition
1	15 October 2018	Al Kuwait Sports Club Stadium, Kuwait City, Kuwait	Kuwait	2–0	4–0	Friendly
2	11 January 2019	Rashid Stadium, Dubai, United Arab Emirates	Palestine	3–0	3–0	2019 AFC Asian Cup

== Honours ==
AEK Larnaca

- Cypriot Cup: 2017–18
