= Xiang Baixu =

Chinese footballer

Xiang Baixu 向柏旭
Personal information
- Full name: Xiang Baixu
- Date of birth: 9 August 1995 (age 31)
- Place of birth: Chongqing, Sichuan, China
- Height: 1.88 m (6 ft 2 in)
- Positions: Forward; central defender

Youth career
- Sichuan Youth
- 2011–2012: → Metz (loan)
- 2014–2015: Saint-Étienne

Senior career*
Years	Team	Apps	(Gls)
2015–2016	Tianjin Quanjian	4	(1)
2017	Guangzhou R&F	9	(0)
2018–2021	Shenzhen FC	7	(0)
2021–2022	Chengdu Rongcheng	18	(4)

International career^{‡}
2013–2014	China U-20	18	(4)
2016–2017	China U-23	8	(1)
- * Club domestic league appearances and goals as of 8 January 2023 ‡ National team caps and goals as of 19 July 2017

Xiang Baixu (Chinese: 向柏旭; pinyin: Xiàng Bǎixù; Mandarin pronunciation: [ɕjâŋ.pàɪ ɕŷ]; born 9 August 1995) is a Chinese professional footballer who last played for Chengdu Rongcheng.

== Club career ==
Xiang Baixu joined Saint-Étienne youth academy in March 2014. He transferred to China League One side Tianjin Quanjian on 7 July 2015. He made his senior debut on 18 July 2015 in a 2–1 home loss against Hunan Billows, coming on as a substitute for Rong Yu in the 67th minute. On 25 September 2016, Xiang scored his first senior in a 3–0 away victory against Xinjiang Tianshan Leopard. At the end of the season he would be part of the squad that won the 2016 China League One campaign and promotion to the top tier.

Xiang transferred to China Super League side Guangzhou R&F on 26 November 2016. He made his debut for the club on 4 March 2017 in a 2–0 home win against Tianjin Quanjian, coming on for Xiao Zhi in the 84th minute. At the end of the 2017 season, he went on to make 11 appearances in all competitions.

On 30 January 2018, Xiang transferred to China League One side Shenzhen FC. He would go on to make his debut in a league game on 11 March 2018 against Heilongjiang Lava Spring F.C. that ended in a 2–2 draw. He went on to be part of the squad would gain promotion to the top tier at the end of the league campaign. He would have limited playing time the following campaign and would eventually be allowed to transfer on a free to second tier club Chengdu Rongcheng on 9 April 2021. His debut appearance would be in a league game against Nanjing City on 30 April 2021, in a 2-0 victory. He would score his first goal for the club in a league game against Xinjiang Tianshan Leopard on 23 July 2021 in a 7-0 victory, where he also scored his first hat-trick. Establishing himself as a regular member within the team, he would aid the club to promotion to the top tier at the end of the 2021 league campaign.

== Career statistics ==
As of 8 January 2023.

Appearances and goals by club, season and competition
Club	Season	League			National Cup		Continental		Other		Total	
Club	Season	Division	Apps	Goals	Apps	Goals	Apps	Goals	Apps	Goals	Apps	Goals
Tianjin Quanjian	2015	China League One	2	0	0	0	-		-		2	0
Tianjin Quanjian	2016	China League One	2	1	3	0	-		-		5	1
Tianjin Quanjian	Total		4	1	3	0	0	0	0	0	7	1
Guangzhou R&F	2017	Chinese Super League	9	0	2	0	-		-		11	0
Shenzhen FC	2018	China League One	3	0	0	0	-		-		3	0
Shenzhen FC	2019	Chinese Super League	4	0	0	0	-		-		4	0
Shenzhen FC	2020	Chinese Super League	0	0	0	0	-		-		0	0
Shenzhen FC	Total		7	0	0	0	0	0	0	0	7	0
Chengdu Rongcheng	2021	China League One	6	4	2	1	-		1 (Note: Appearance(s) in CSL Relegation play-offs)	0	9	5
Chengdu Rongcheng	2022	Chinese Super League	12	0	2	0	-		-		14	0
Chengdu Rongcheng	Total		18	4	4	0	0	0	1	0	23	4
Career total			38	5	9	1	0	0	1	0	48	6

== Honours ==
=== Club ===
Tianjin Quanjian

- China League One: 2016
