= Zhang Chenlong =

Chinese footballer

Zhang Chenlong 张晨龙
Personal information
- Full name: Zhang Chenlong
- Date of birth: 27 April 1993 (age 33)
- Place of birth: Wuhan, Hubei, China
- Height: 1.75 m (5 ft 9 in)
- Position: Left-back

Team information
- Current team: Ganzhou Ruishi
- Number: 12

Youth career
- Dongguan Nancheng
- 2013–2014: Guangzhou R&F

Senior career*
Years	Team	Apps	(Gls)
2011–2012	Dongguan Nancheng	13	(1)
2015–2019	Guangzhou R&F	28	(0)
2019	→ Beijing Renhe (loan)	6	(0)
2020	Zhejiang Yiteng	8	(0)
2021	Hebei Zhuoao	13	(0)
2022	Hunan Billows	0	(0)
2023	Guangxi Lanhang	11	(2)
2024-	Ganzhou Ruishi	16	(0)
- * Club domestic league appearances and goals as of 5 August 2024

Zhang Chenlong (Chinese: 张晨龙; pinyin: Zhāng Chénlóng; Mandarin pronunciation: [ʈʂáŋ ʈʂʰə̌n lʊ̌ŋ]; born 27 April 1993) is a Chinese football player who currently plays for Ganzhou Ruishi in the China League Two.

== Club career ==
Zhang Chenlong started his professional football career in 2011 when he was promoted to Dongguan Nancheng's squad for the 2011 China League Two campaign. He received cardiac surgery during the 2011 season and returned to field in May 2012. On 12 May 2012, he made his senior debut in a victory against Sichuan FC, coming on as a substitute for Xiang Jiachi in the 75th minute. On 26 May 2012, he scored two goals in the first round of 2012 Chinese FA Cup, which ensured Dongguan Nancheng beat amateur team Zibo Sunday and advanced to second round. He played 13 league match in the 2012 season, all came from substitution and scored one goal.

Zhang transferred to Chinese Super League side Guangzhou R&F in 2013. After playing in the reserve league for two years, he was promoted to Guangzhou R&F's first team squad by Cosmin Contra in 2015. On 6 May 2015, he made his debut for Guangzhou R&F in the last match of 2015 AFC Champions League group stage against Buriram United in a 5–0 away defeat. He made his first-tier league debut on 20 June 2015, playing the whole match in a 2–1 away defeat to Chongqing Lifan. Playing as a substitute for Jiang Zhipeng, Zhang didn't get too many chances for the first team. However, on 15 January 2018, Zhang earned a contract renewal after Jiang Zhipeng's departure for Hebei China Fortune, extending his contract with the club until the end of 2021. On 25 July 2018, he scored his first goal for the club from an extremely tight angle near the post line in a 3–2 home win over Jiangsu Suning in the second leg of 2018 Chinese FA Cup.

== Career statistics ==
As of 5 August 2024.

Appearances and goals by club, season and competition
Club	Season	League			National Cup		Continental		Other		Total	
Club	Season	Division	Apps	Goals	Apps	Goals	Apps	Goals	Apps	Goals	Apps	Goals
Dongguan Nancheng	2011	China League Two	0	0	-		-		-		0	0
Dongguan Nancheng	2012	China League Two	13	1	2	2	-		-		15	3
Dongguan Nancheng	Total		13	1	2	2	0	0	0	0	15	3
Guangzhou R&F	2015	Chinese Super League	4	0	1	0	1	0	-		6	0
Guangzhou R&F	2016	Chinese Super League	4	0	2	0	-		-		6	0
Guangzhou R&F	2017	Chinese Super League	7	0	3	0	-		-		10	0
Guangzhou R&F	2018	Chinese Super League	12	0	4	1	-		-		16	1
Guangzhou R&F	2019	Chinese Super League	1	0	0	0	-		-		1	0
Guangzhou R&F	Total		28	0	10	1	0	0	0	0	37	1
Beijing Renhe (loan)	2019	Chinese Super League	6	0	0	0	-		-		6	0
Zhejiang Yiteng	2020	China League Two	8	0	-		-		-		8	0
Hebei Zhuoao	2021	China League Two	13	0	0	0	-		-		13	0
Hunan Billows	2022	China League Two	0	0	0	0	-		-		0	0
Guangxi Lanhang	2023	China League Two	11	2	2	1	-		-		13	3
Ganzhou Ruishi	2024	China League Two	16	0	1	0	-		-		17	0
Total			95	3	15	4	1	0	0	0	111	7
