= Wu Qing (footballer) =

Chinese footballer

Wu Qing 吴庆
Personal information
- Full name: Wu Qing
- Date of birth: July 4, 1981 (age 45)
- Place of birth: Chongqing, Sichuan, China
- Height: 1.70 m (5 ft 7 in)
- Positions: Left winger; left-back

Team information
- Current team: Chongqing Tonglianglong (team manager)

Senior career*
| Years | Team | Apps | (Gls) |
| 2001–2010 | Chongqing Lifan | 178 | (17) |
| 2011–2012 | Dalian Aerbin | 24 | (3) |
| 2013–2022 | Chongqing Liangjiang Athletic | 165 | (16) |
| 2022–2024 | Chongqing Tonglianglong | 9 | (2) |

Managerial career
- 2020–2022: Chongqing Liangjiang Athletic (assistant)
- 2024: Chongqing Tonglianglong (assistant)
- 2025–: Chongqing Tonglianglong (team manager)
- * Club domestic league appearances and goals

Wu Qing (Chinese: 吴庆; born 4 July 1981) is a Chinese football coach and former professional footballer.

== Club career ==
Wu Qing would be promoted to the senior team of Chongqing Lifan in the 2002 league season under head coach Edson Tavares. Over the following seasons he would go on to establish himself as a regular within the squad, however by the end of the 2006 league season he was part of the team that was relegated to the second tier. He would remain with the club and would be a vital member of the team that went on to gain promotion back into top tier at the end of the 2008 league season. Back in the top tier the club would struggle to remain within the league and were relegated once more at the end of the 2010 Chinese Super League season. Wu Qing would move to second tier club Dalian Aerbin the following season where he went on to win the division title and promotion to the top tier. His second season at Dalian Aerbin would see Wu lose his place at the club's starting line-up and he rejoined Chongqing Lifan. On his return to Chongqing he would once again help guide them to promotion back into the Chinese Super League. Wu would go on to captain the team and on 4 November 2017, against Guangzhou R&F F.C. he would establish himself as the club's most capped player.

On 18 December 2021, Wu scored his first goal in over 4 years in a 4-1 defeat against Shanghai Shenhua, at the age of 40 years and 167 days, he became the oldest goal scorer in Chinese Super League history, surpassing Zhou Ting's record in 2019.

On 24 May 2022, Wu announced his retirement following Chongqing Liangjiang Athletic's decision to dissolve and exit the Chinese Super League earlier that day. He made over 350 appearances for the club in 2 stints.

On 31 December 2024, Chongqing Tonglianglong announced that Wu is retired from professional football and keep his role as the assistant coach in the club.

== Career statistics ==
Appearances and goals by club, season and competition
| Club | Season | League | | | National Cup | | League Cup | | Continental | | Total | |
| Club | Season | Division | Apps | Goals | Apps | Goals | Apps | Goals | Apps | Goals | Apps | Goals |
|---|---|---|---|---|---|---|---|---|---|---|---|---|
| Chongqing Lifan | 2002 | Chinese Jia-A League | 13 | 1 | 0 | 0 | - | | - | | 13 | 1 |
| Chongqing Lifan | 2003 | Chinese Jia-A League | 14 | 0 | ? | 0 | - | | - | | 14 | 0 |
| Chongqing Lifan | 2004 | Chinese Super League | 14 | 2 | 0 | 0 | 1 | 0 | - | | 15 | 2 |
| Chongqing Lifan | 2005 | Chinese Super League | 21 | 2 | 1 | 0 | 4 | 0 | - | | 26 | 2 |
| Chongqing Lifan | 2006 | Chinese Super League | 23 | 3 | ? | 0 | - | | - | | 23 | 3 |
| Chongqing Lifan | 2007 | Chinese League One | 21 | 1 | - | | - | | - | | 21 | 1 |
| Chongqing Lifan | 2008 | Chinese League One | 24 | 6 | - | | - | | - | | 24 | 6 |
| Chongqing Lifan | 2009 | Chinese Super League | 24 | 0 | - | | - | | - | | 24 | 0 |
| Chongqing Lifan | 2010 | Chinese Super League | 23 | 2 | - | | - | | - | | 23 | 2 |
| Chongqing Lifan | Total | | 178 | 17 | 1 | 0 | 5 | 0 | 0 | 0 | 184 | 17 |
| Dalian Aerbin | 2011 | Chinese League One | 15 | 3 | 1 | 0 | - | | - | | 16 | 3 |
| Dalian Aerbin | 2012 | Chinese Super League | 9 | 0 | 1 | 0 | - | | - | | 10 | 0 |
| Dalian Aerbin | Total | | 24 | 3 | 2 | 0 | 0 | 0 | 0 | 0 | 26 | 3 |
| Chongqing Lifan | 2013 | Chinese League One | 25 | 8 | 0 | 0 | - | | - | | 25 | 8 |
| Chongqing Lifan | 2014 | Chinese League One | 30 | 6 | 1 | 0 | - | | - | | 31 | 6 |
| Chongqing Lifan | 2015 | Chinese Super League | 12 | 0 | 2 | 0 | - | | - | | 14 | 0 |
| Chongqing Lifan | 2016 | Chinese Super League | 25 | 2 | 0 | 0 | - | | - | | 25 | 2 |
| Chongqing Lifan | 2017 | Chinese Super League | 29 | 5 | 0 | 0 | - | | - | | 29 | 5 |
| Chongqing Lifan | 2018 | Chinese Super League | 9 | 0 | 1 | 0 | - | | - | | 10 | 0 |
| Chongqing Lifan | 2019 | Chinese Super League | 6 | 0 | 2 | 0 | - | | - | | 8 | 0 |
| Chongqing Lifan | 2020 | Chinese Super League | 9 | 0 | 1 | 0 | - | | - | | 10 | 0 |
| Chongqing Lifan | 2021 | Chinese Super League | 20 | 1 | 2 | 0 | - | | - | | 22 | 1 |
| Chongqing Lifan | Total | | 164 | 22 | 9 | 0 | 0 | 0 | 0 | 0 | 173 | 22 |
| Total | | | 366 | 42 | 12 | 0 | 5 | 0 | 0 | 0 | 383 | 42 |

== Honours ==
=== Club ===
Dalian Aerbin F.C.

- China League One: 2011

Chongqing Lifan

- China League One: 2014
