= Jiang Jihong =

Chinese footballer

Jiang Jihong 姜积弘
Personal information
- Full name: Jiang Jihong
- Date of birth: 8 February 1990 (age 36)
- Place of birth: Dalian, Liaoning, China
- Height: 1.88 m (6 ft 2 in)
- Position: Defender

Team information
- Current team: Guangdong GZ-Power
- Number: 5

Youth career
- 2005–2009: Dalian Shide

Senior career*
Years	Team	Apps	(Gls)
2008	Dalian Shide Singapore	31	(2)
2010–2012	Dalian Shide	21	(0)
2013	Tianjin Songjiang	23	(0)
2014–2016	Shijiazhuang Ever Bright	54	(2)
2017–2022	Guangzhou City	126	(4)
2023–2024	Yunnan Yukun	46	(2)
2025–	Guangdong GZ-Power	27	(1)
- * Club domestic league appearances and goals as of 31 December 2025

Jiang Jihong (Chinese: 姜积弘; pinyin: Jiāng Jīhóng; Mandarin pronunciation: [tɕjáŋ tɕí xʊ̌ŋ];) is a professional Chinese footballer who currently plays for Guangdong GZ-Power in the China League One as a defender.

== Club career ==
Jiang Jihong started his career with Dalian Shide F.C. and was sent out to their youth team called Dalian Shide Siwu FC who were allowed to take part in Singapore's 2008 S.League. Upon his return he was promoted to the club's first team and on 22 August 2010 he made his debut in a league game against Changsha Ginde in a 1-0 defeat. Before the start of the 2013 Chinese Super League season the club would go through a protracted acquisition from local top tier rivals Dalian Yifang (now named Dalian Professional).

=== Tianjin Songjiang ===
On 28 February 2013 he would be allowed to join second tier club Tianjin Songjiang.

=== Shijiazhuang Yongchang ===
On 20 January 2014, Jiang transferred to China League One side Shijiazhuang Yongchang.

=== Guanzhou R&F/ Guanzhou City ===
On 20 January 2017, he moved to fellow Super League side Guangzhou R&F (now known as Guangzhou City) on a free transfer after Shijiazhuang were relegated to the second tier. He made his debut for Guangzhou on 4 March 2017 in a 2–0 home win against Tianjin Quanjian.

=== Yunnan Yukun ===
In 2023, after 6 years at Guangzhou City and the club dissolvement, he joined China League Two side Yunnan Yukun

== Career statistics ==
Statistics accurate as of match played 31 December 2025.

Appearances and goals by club, season and competition
Club	Season	League			National Cup		League Cup		Continental		Total	
Club	Season	Division	Apps	Goals	Apps	Goals	Apps	Goals	Apps	Goals	Apps	Goals
Dalian Shide Siwu FC	2008	S.League	31	2	1	0	1	0	-		33	2
Dalian Shide	2010	Chinese Super League	8	0	-		-		-		8	0
Dalian Shide	2011	Chinese Super League	11	0	1	0	-		-		12	0
Dalian Shide	2012	Chinese Super League	2	0	1	0	-		-		3	0
Dalian Shide	Total		21	0	2	0	0	0	0	0	23	0
Tianjin Songjiang	2013	China League One	23	0	2	0	-		-		25	0
Shijiazhuang Ever Bright	2014	China League One	21	0	1	0	-		-		22	0
Shijiazhuang Ever Bright	2015	Chinese Super League	12	0	1	0	-		-		13	0
Shijiazhuang Ever Bright	2016	Chinese Super League	21	2	0	0	-		-		21	2
Shijiazhuang Ever Bright	Total		54	2	2	0	0	0	0	0	56	2
Guangzhou R&F/ Guangzhou City	2017	Chinese Super League	23	1	2	0	-		-		25	1
Guangzhou R&F/ Guangzhou City	2018	Chinese Super League	18	0	3	0	-		-		21	0
Guangzhou R&F/ Guangzhou City	2019	Chinese Super League	20	1	0	0	-		-		20	1
Guangzhou R&F/ Guangzhou City	2020	Chinese Super League	14	0	2	0	-		-		16	0
Guangzhou R&F/ Guangzhou City	2021	Chinese Super League	21	1	1	0	-		-		22	1
Guangzhou R&F/ Guangzhou City	2022	Chinese Super League	30	1	0	0	-		-		30	1
Guangzhou R&F/ Guangzhou City	Total		126	4	8	0	0	0	0	0	134	4
Yunnan Yukun	2023	China League Two	20	1	1	0	-		-		21	1
Yunnan Yukun	2024	China League One	26	1	1	0	-		-		27	1
Yunnan Yukun	Total		46	2	2	0	0	0	0	0	48	2
Guangdong GZ-Power	2025	China League One	27	1	1	0	-		-		28	1
Career total			328	11	18	0	1	0	0	0	347	11

== Honours ==
=== Club ===
Guangdong GZ-Power

- China League One: 2026
