= Liu Dianzuo =

Chinese footballer (born 1990)

Liu Dianzuo 刘殿座
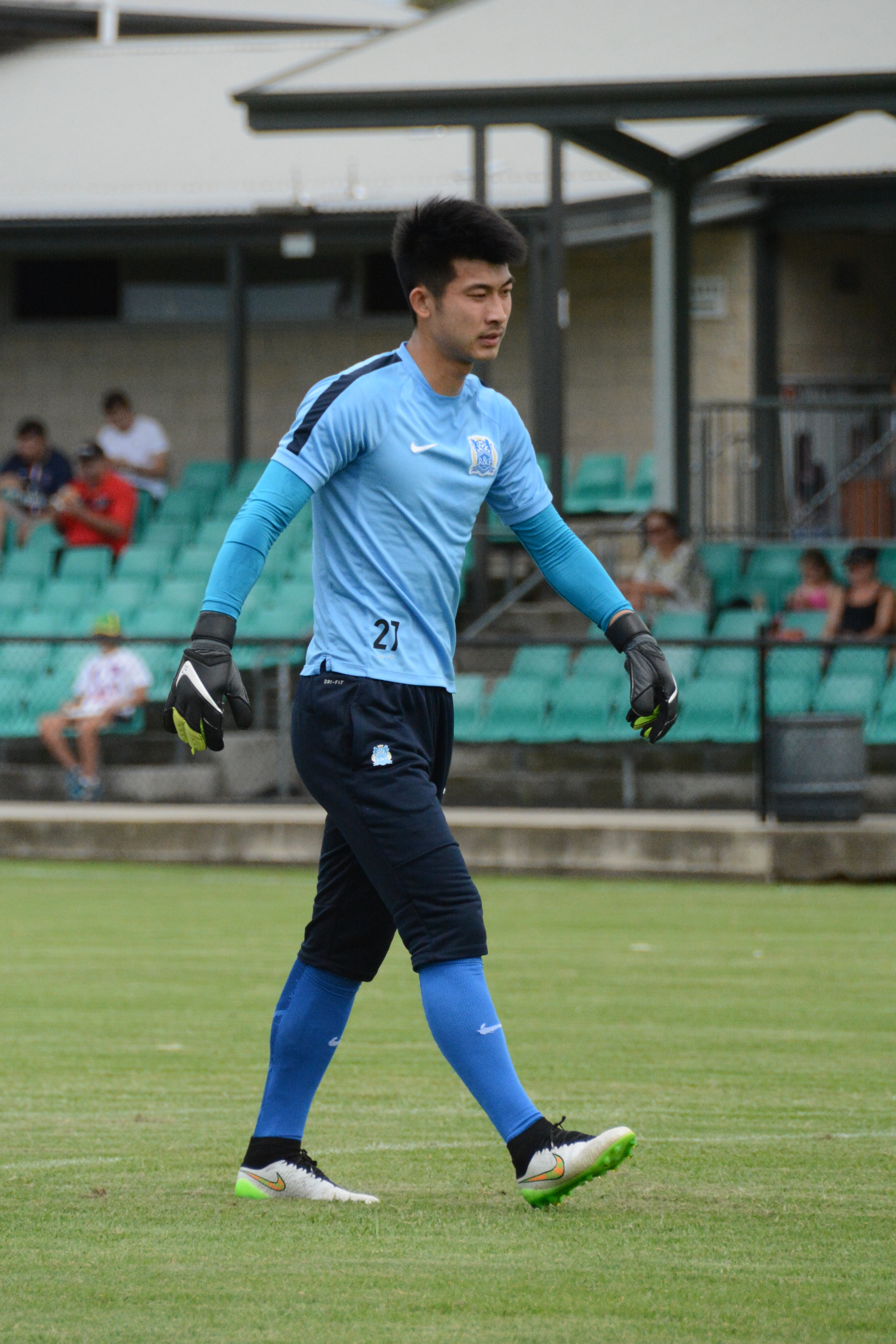

Personal information
- Full name: Liu Dianzuo
- Date of birth: 26 June 1990 (age 36)
- Place of birth: Dalian, Liaoning, China
- Height: 1.90 m (6 ft 3 in)
- Position: Goalkeeper

Team information
- Current team: Chengdu Rongcheng
- Number: 32

Youth career
- 2004–2006: Dalian Yiteng

Senior career*
Years	Team	Apps	(Gls)
2006–2010	Dalian Yiteng	57	(0)
2011–2015	Shanghai Shenxin	113	(0)
2015–2016	Guangzhou R&F	18	(0)
2016–2021	Guangzhou FC	75	(0)
2022–2024	Wuhan Three Towns	84	(0)
2025–	Chengdu Rongcheng	52	(0)

International career
2019–	China	7	(0)
Medal record
Representing China
Men's football
EAFF Championship
Bronze medal – third place	2019 South Korea	Team
- * Club domestic league appearances and goals as of 31 August 2026

Liu Dianzuo (Chinese: 刘殿座; pinyin: Liú Diànzuò; Mandarin pronunciation: [ljǒʊ tjɛ̂n tswô]; born 26 June 1990) is a Chinese professional footballer who plays as a goalkeeper for Chinese Super League club Chengdu Rongcheng and the China national team.

== Club career ==
=== Early career ===
Liu started his football career in 2006 when he was promoted to China League Two club Dalian Yiteng's first team. He became the club's first-choice goalkeeper in the middle of 2006 season. Liu earned a trial with Chinese Super League club Nanchang Hengyuan in 2010 and signed a five-year contract with it in January 2011. He made his debut for Nanchang Hengyuan on 4 May 2011 in a 3–1 victory against Beijing BIT in the first round of the 2011 Chinese FA Cup. Liu established himself as regular for the club and played 23 matches during the 2011 season, helping the club avoid relegation. He appeared in every minute of the 2012, 2013, and 2014 league season after the club moved to Shanghai.

=== Guangzhou ===
On 1 January 2015, Liu transferred to fellow top tier side Guangzhou R&F. He made his debut for the club on 10 February 2015 in a 3–0 victory against Warriors FC in the preliminary round of the 2015 AFC Champions League. He lost his starting position to Cheng Yuelei towards the end of the 2015 season.

On 11 February 2016, Liu transferred to Guangzhou R&F's city rivals Guangzhou FC. He made his debut for the club on 3 May 2016 in a 1-0 win against Sydney FC in the last group match of the 2016 AFC Champions League. Liu played as backup to Zeng Cheng in the 2016 season and made seven league appearances after Zeng's injury in September 2016. After several seasons, he eventually went on to replace Zeng as the club's first choice goalkeeper and win the 2019 Chinese Super League title with the club. At the end of the 2021 league season, his club admitted that they were in financial difficulties and allowed their first choice players to leave the team.

=== Later career ===
On 29 April 2022, Liu signed with newly-promoted top tier club Wuhan Three Towns. On 3 June, he debuted in a league match against Hebei, which ended in a 4-0 victory. Afterwards, Liu established himself as a regular footballer within the club that won the 2022 Chinese Super League title. On 18 February 2025, Liu joined Chinese Super League club Chengdu Rongcheng.

== International career ==
In February 2014, Liu received his first call-up to the Chinese national team in a 2015 AFC Asian Cup qualification match against Iraq. However, he remained on the bench as an unused substitute. On 10 December 2019, Liu made his international debut in a 1–2 defeat against Japan at the 2019 EAFF E-1 Football Championship.

On 12 December 2023, Liu was named in China's squad for the 2023 AFC Asian Cup in Qatar.

== Career statistics ==
=== Club statistics ===
As of 4 November 2024

Appearances and goals by club, season and competition
Club	Season	League			National Cup		Continental		Other		Total	
Club	Season	Division	Apps	Goals	Apps	Goals	Apps	Goals	Apps	Goals	Apps	Goals
Dalian Yiteng	2006	China League Two			-		-		-			
Dalian Yiteng	2007	China League One	10	0	-		-		-		10	0
Dalian Yiteng	2008	China League One	17	0	-		-		-		17	0
Dalian Yiteng	2009	China League Two	12	0	-		-		-		12	0
Dalian Yiteng	2010	China League Two	18	0	-		-		-		18	0
Dalian Yiteng	Total		57	0	0	0	0	0	0	0	57	0
Shanghai Shenxin	2011	Chinese Super League	23	0	2	0	-		-		25	0
Shanghai Shenxin	2012	Chinese Super League	30	0	0	0	-		-		30	0
Shanghai Shenxin	2013	Chinese Super League	30	0	0	0	-		-		30	0
Shanghai Shenxin	2014	Chinese Super League	30	0	1	0	-		-		31	0
Shanghai Shenxin	Total		113	0	3	0	0	0	0	0	116	0
Guangzhou R&F	2015	Chinese Super League	18	0	2	0	7	0	-		27	0
Guangzhou Evergrande	2016	Chinese Super League	7	0	3	0	1	0	0 (Note: Appearances in Chinese FA Super Cup)	0	11	0
Guangzhou Evergrande	2017	Chinese Super League	1	0	5	0	0	0	0	0	6	0
Guangzhou Evergrande	2018	Chinese Super League	3	0	2	0	2	0	1	0	8	0
Guangzhou Evergrande	2019	Chinese Super League	26	0	2	0	6	0	-		34	0
Guangzhou Evergrande	2020	Chinese Super League	19	0	0	0	4	0	-		23	0
Guangzhou Evergrande	2021	Chinese Super League	19	0	0	0	0	0	-		19	0
Guangzhou Evergrande	Total		75	0	12	0	13	0	1	0	101	0
Wuhan Three Towns	2022	Chinese Super League	26	0	0	0	-		-		26	0
Wuhan Three Towns	2023	Chinese Super League	30	0	1	0	6	0	1	0	38	0
Wuhan Three Towns	2024	Chinese Super League	28	0	1	0	-		-		29	0
Wuhan Three Towns	Total		84	0	2	0	6	0	1	0	93	0
Career total			347	0	18	0	26	0	2	0	394	0

=== International statistics ===
National team
Year	Apps	Goals
2019	3	0
2020	0	0
2021	0	0
2022	0	0
2023	0	0
2024	1	0
2026	3	0
Total	7	0

== Honours ==
Guangzhou FC

- Chinese Super League: 2016, 2017, 2019
- Chinese FA Cup: 2016
- Chinese FA Super Cup: 2016, 2017, 2018

Wuhan Three Towns

- Chinese Super League: 2022
- Chinese FA Super Cup: 2023
