= Renatinho (footballer, born October 1988) =

Brazilian footballer

Personal information
- Full name: Renato Ribeiro Calixto
- Date of birth: 4 October 1988 (age 38)
- Place of birth: Cardoso, Brazil
- Height: 1.67 m (5 ft 5 1/2 in)
- Positions: Left winger; midfielder

Youth career
- –2007: Coritiba

Senior career*
Years	Team	Apps	(Gls)
2007–2013	Coritiba	57	(7)
2008	→ Londrina (loan)	9	(1)
2010	→ Atlético Goianiense (loan)	10	(0)
2011	→ Ponte Preta (loan)	34	(4)
2012–2013	→ Kawasaki Frontale (loan)	57	(22)
2014–2015	Kawasaki Frontale	47	(15)
2015–2020	Guangzhou R&F	98	(32)
2019	→ Tianjin Tianhai (loan)	23	(6)
2021	Ponte Preta	14	(1)
- * Club domestic league appearances and goals as of 10 November 2020

Renato Ribeiro Calixto (born October 4, 1988, in Cardoso, São Paulo), most commonly known as Renatinho, is a Brazilian footballer who plays as a winger.

== Club career ==
=== Coritiba ===
Renatinho came up through the Coritiba youth system. He was called up to the senior side for the 2008 Campeonato Paranaense where he scored a wonderful free kick goal. He was then loaned out to Londrina to gain experience.

=== Londrina ===
In October 2008, Renatinho was loaned to Londrina to participate in the 2008 Copa Parana. He helped the team to win the title. He scored the lone goal in the final, as well as in the penalties.

=== Return to Coritiba ===
Renatinho returned to Coritiba for the 2009 Campeonato Paranaense, where he made his mark as a starter, scoring twice in 17 games. He also started 6 times in the Copa do Brasil, scoring once. He had a bit of trouble establishing himself in the early stages of the Campeonato Brasileiro, but he eventually broke through and is now a regular. He scored his first goal in his very first game, 5 minutes into a 4-2 loss against Santo André on 16 May 2009. He has since added to the tally against São Paulo on 7 October 2009.

He has also featured in both of Coritiba's Copa Sudamericana matches in 2009, scoring once.

=== Kawasaki Frontale ===
On 17 December 2011, Renatinho signed with Japanese side Kawasaki Frontale on a loan deal lasting until the end of the 2012 season.

=== China ===
On 15 July 2015, Renatinho transferred to Chinese Super League side Guangzhou R&F. In China he is known as 雷纳迪尼奥. On 28 February 2019, Renatinho was loaned to fellow first-tier club Tianjin Tianhai for the 2019 season. He returned to Guangzhou for the 2020 season and made his 100th appearance for the club in September 2020.

== Playing style ==
Renatinho is a player who uses his low centre of gravity to control the ball on various runs. He has developed a reputation for the spectacular. For a player of his size and position, he is also quite responsible defensively. He likes to play behind the striker or on the wings.

== Career statistics ==
As of match played 31 December 2025.

Appearances and goals by club, season and competition
Club	Season	League			State League		National Cup		League Cup		Continental		Other		Total	
Club	Season	Division	Apps	Goals	Apps	Goals	Apps	Goals	Apps	Goals	Apps	Goals	Apps	Goals	Apps	Goals
Coritiba	2008	Série A	0	0	—		2	1	—		—		—		2	1
Coritiba	2009	Série A	22	2	0 (Note: Appearances in Campeonato Paranaense)	0	6	1	—		2	1	—		30	4
Coritiba	2010	Série B	4	0	—		3	0	—		—		—		7	0
Coritiba	Total		26	2	0	0	11	2	—		2	1	—		39	5
Londrina (loan)	2008	—			9	1	—		—		—		—		9	1
Atlético Goianiense (loan)	2010	Série A	10	0	3 (Note: Appearances in Campeonato Goiano)	0	—		—		—		—		13	0
Ponte Preta (loan)	2011	Série B	33	4	16 (Note: Appearances in Campeonato Paulista)	5	0	0	—		—		—		49	9
Kawasaki Frontale (loan)	2012	J.League	29	10	—		2	3	6	1	—		—		37	14
Kawasaki Frontale (loan)	2013	J.League	28	12	—		2	1	7	3	—		—		37	16
Kawasaki Frontale (loan)	Total		57	22	—		4	4	13	4	—		—		74	30
Kawasaki Frontale	2014	J.League	30	6	—		0	0	4	2	6	2	—		40	10
Kawasaki Frontale	2015	J.League	17	9	—		0	0	5	0	—		—		24	9
Kawasaki Frontale	Total		47	15	—		0	0	9	2	6	2	—		62	19
Guangzhou R&F	2015	Chinese Super League	11	2	—		0	0	—		—		—		11	2
Guangzhou R&F	2016	Chinese Super League	23	9	—		3	0	—		—		—		26	9
Guangzhou R&F	2017	Chinese Super League	26	12	—		3	4	—		—		—		29	16
Guangzhou R&F	2018	Chinese Super League	25	9	—		1	0	—		—		—		26	9
Guangzhou R&F	2020	Chinese Super League	13	0	—		2	3	—		—		—		15	3
Guangzhou R&F	Total		98	32	—		9	7	—		—		—		107	39
Tianjin Tianhai (loan)	2019	Chinese Super League	23	7	—		2	1	—		—		—		25	8
Ponte Preta	2021	Série B	9	1	5	0	—		—		—		—		14	1
Tombense	2022	Série B	25	4	—		0	0	—		—		—		25	4
Amazonas	2023	Série C	3	0	—		—		—		—		—		3	0
Villa Nova	2022	—			8 (Note: Appearances in Campeonato Mineiro)	1	2	0	—		—		—		10	1
Real Noroeste	2024	Série D	3	0	—		—		—		—		—		3	0
Rio Branco	2025	Série D	0	0	1 (Note: Appearances in Campeonato Capixaba)	1	0	0	—		—		1 (Note: Appearances in Copa Verde)	0	2	0
Total			333	87	42	7	28	14	22	6	8	3	1	0	434	117

== Honours ==
=== Club ===
Coritiba

- Campeonato Paranaense: 2008

Londrina

- Copa Paraná: 2008
