= Cheng Yuelei =

Chinese footballer

Cheng Yuelei 程月磊
Personal information
- Full name: Cheng Yuelei
- Date of birth: 28 October 1987 (age 39)
- Place of birth: Beijing, China
- Height: 1.88 m (6 ft 2 in)
- Position: Goalkeeper

Team information
- Current team: Shenzhen Juniors

Youth career
- 2001–2004: Sichuan Guancheng

Senior career*
Years	Team	Apps	(Gls)
2005	Sichuan Guancheng	0	(0)
2006	Dalian Shide	0	(0)
2007–2008	Beijing Guoan	0	(0)
2009–2011	Shenzhen Ruby	64	(0)
2012–2022	Guangzhou City	208	(0)
2023–2024	Meizhou Hakka	56	(0)
2025–	Shenzhen Juniors	0	(0)

International career^{‡}
2011	China	2	(0)
- * Club domestic league appearances and goals as of 20 December 2023 ‡ National team caps and goals as of 26 October 2014

Cheng Yuelei (Chinese: 程月磊; pinyin: Chéng Yuèlěi; Mandarin pronunciation: [ʈʂʰə̌ŋ ɥê lèɪ]; born 28 October 1987 in Beijing) is a Chinese footballer who currently plays for Shenzhen Juniors in the China League One.

== Club career ==
Cheng Yuelei began his football career at Sichuan Guancheng in 2001 when he joined their youth team and he would eventually progress to the senior team in 2005. He was included in several first team squads, however before he was given a chance to establish himself within the club, the team disbanded. Nevertheless, Cheng moved to the league champions Dalian Shide the following season, yet he saw his development digress when he was excluded from their first team squad and dropped to the reserves. He then transferred to Beijing Guoan and saw himself fight for the second choice goalkeeping position with Zhang Sipeng throughout much of the 2008 season.

At the beginning of the 2009 season, Cheng transferred to Shenzhen Ruby and after several games, he was chosen as their first choice goalkeeper when he made his debut against Shaanxi Chanba on 4 April 2009 in a 2-1 win For the next two seasons, Cheng would go on to be vital member at the club where they were midtable regulars until Philippe Troussier became their manager and after a series of defeats, he decided to drop Cheng for Zhang Xunwei during the 2011 season as the club was relegated from the first tier. Because Cheng was still considered a promising goalkeeper, he would join recently promoted Guangzhou R&F on a five-year contract at the beginning of the 2012 season.

Cheng was Guangzhou R&F's main keeper over the 2012-2019 seasons with the exception of 2015 when Liu Dianzuo played more games. By the end of the 2019 season, Cheng had played 200 games for Guangzhou R&F. However, he didn't play a single league minute in 2020 as U21 player Han Jiaqi became first choice goalkeeper.

On 8 January 2025, Cheng joined China League One club Shenzhen Juniors.

== International career ==
Cheng was called up to the Chinese national team to play against New Zealand on 25 March 2011 and he made his debut by coming on as an early substitute for injured goalkeeper Zeng Cheng in a 1-1 draw. Cheng would then go on to make his first start for the team soon afterwards by starting in a friendly against Honduras on 29 March 2011 in a 3-0 victory.

== Career statistics ==
Statistics accurate as of match played 2 November 2024.

Appearances and goals by club, season and competition
Club	Season	League			National Cup		League Cup		Continental		Total	
Club	Season	Division	Apps	Goals	Apps	Goals	Apps	Goals	Apps	Goals	Apps	Goals
Sichuan Guancheng	2005	Chinese Super League	0	0	0	0	0	0	–		0	0
Beijing Guoan	2007	Chinese Super League	0	0	–		–		–		0	0
Beijing Guoan	2008	Chinese Super League	0	0	–		–		0	0	0	0
Beijing Guoan	Total		0	0	0	0	0	0	0	0	0	0
Shenzhen Ruby	2009	Chinese Super League	23	0	–		–		–		23	0
Shenzhen Ruby	2010	Chinese Super League	29	0	–		–		–		29	0
Shenzhen Ruby	2011	Chinese Super League	12	0	1	0	–		–		13	0
Shenzhen Ruby	Total		64	0	1	0	0	0	0	0	65	0
Guangzhou R&F	2012	Chinese Super League	30	0	2	0	–		–		32	0
Guangzhou R&F	2013	Chinese Super League	19	0	1	0	–		–		20	0
Guangzhou R&F	2014	Chinese Super League	23	0	0	0	–		–		23	0
Guangzhou R&F	2015	Chinese Super League	12	0	0	0	–		0	0	12	0
Guangzhou R&F	2016	Chinese Super League	24	0	2	0	–		–		26	0
Guangzhou R&F	2017	Chinese Super League	30	0	0	0	–		–		30	0
Guangzhou R&F	2018	Chinese Super League	30	0	1	0	–		–		31	0
Guangzhou R&F	2019	Chinese Super League	29	0	0	0	–		–		29	0
Guangzhou R&F	2020	Chinese Super League	0	0	0	0	–		–		0	0
Guangzhou R&F	2021	Chinese Super League	1	0	0	0	–		–		1	0
Guangzhou R&F	2022	Chinese Super League	10	0	0	0	–		–		10	0
Guangzhou R&F	Total		208	0	6	0	0	0	0	0	214	0
Meizhou Hakka	2023	Chinese Super League	28	0	0	0	–		–		28	0
Meizhou Hakka	2024	Chinese Super League	28	0	0	0	–		–		28	0
Meizhou Hakka	Total		56	0	0	0	0	0	0	0	56	0
Career total			328	0	7	0	0	0	0	0	335	0
