= Zeng Chao =

Chinese footballer

Zeng Chao 曾超
Personal information
- Full name: Zeng Chao
- Date of birth: 23 January 1993 (age 33)
- Place of birth: Meizhou, Guangdong, China
- Height: 1.70 m (5 ft 7 in)
- Position: Winger

Youth career
- 2005–2013: Shandong Luneng
- 2014–2015: Guangzhou R&F

Senior career*
Years	Team	Apps	(Gls)
2011–2012	Shandong Youth	36	(0)
2014	→ Guangdong Sunray Cave (loan)	14	(2)
2015–2017	Guangzhou R&F	35	(3)
2018–2019	Guangdong South China Tiger	54	(4)
2020–2022	Guangzhou City	12	(0)
2023–2025	Guangdong GZ-Power	42	(1)

Managerial career
- 2025: Guangdong GZ-Power (assistant)
- * Club domestic league appearances and goals as of 31 December 2025

Zeng Chao (Chinese: 曾超; pinyin: Zēng Chāo; Mandarin pronunciation: [tsə́ŋ.ʈʂʰáʊ]; born 23 January 1993) is a Chinese footballer.

== Club career ==
Zeng Chao started his football career when he joined Shandong Luneng's youth academy with Liu Binbin in 2005. He played for China League Two side Shandong Youth in 2011 and 2012. Failing to promote to the first team, Zeng transferred to Chinese Super League side Guangzhou R&F in 2014. He was loaned to China League One side Guangdong Sunray Cave for half season in July 2014. He played 14 matches and scored 2 goals in the 2014 season as Guangdong Sunray Cave avoided to relegate to the third tier.

Zeng was promoted to Guangzhou R&F's first team squad in July 2015. He made his Super League debut on 23 April 2016 against Jiangsu Suning, coming on for Tang Miao in the 80th minute. He scored his Super League goal two minutes after the substitution, which ensured Guangzhou R&F tied with Jiangsu Suning 1–1. He scored three goals in 22 league appearances in the 2016 season and extended his contract with the club for five years on 7 November 2016.

Zeng transferred to his hometown club Meizhou Meixian Techand who newly promoted to China League One on 1 January 2018. On 10 March 2018, he made his debut for the club in the season's opener against Yanbian Funde. On 7 November 2018, he scored his first goal in a 1–1 away draw against Shaanxi Chang'an Athletic in the first leg of 2018 China League One Relegation play-offs.

In May 2023, Zeng joined Chinese Champions League club Guangzhou E-Power.

On 14 August 2025, Zeng was appointed as the assistant coach of Guangdong GZ-Power first team.

== Career statistics ==
As of 31 December 2025.

Appearances and goals by club, season and competition
Club	Season	League			National Cup		Continental		Other		Total	
Club	Season	Division	Apps	Goals	Apps	Goals	Apps	Goals	Apps	Goals	Apps	Goals
Shandong Youth	2011	China League Two	15	0	-		-		-		15	0
Shandong Youth	2012	China League Two	21	0	1	0	-		-		22	0
Shandong Youth	Total		36	0	1	0	0	0	0	0	37	0
Guangdong Sunray Cave (loan)	2014	China League One	14	2	0	0	-		-		14	2
Guangzhou R&F	2015	Chinese Super League	0	0	0	0	0	0	-		0	0
Guangzhou R&F	2016	Chinese Super League	22	3	4	0	-		-		26	3
Guangzhou R&F	2017	Chinese Super League	13	0	3	1	-		-		16	1
Guangzhou R&F	Total		35	3	7	1	0	0	0	0	42	4
Meixian Techand/ Guangdong South China Tiger	2018	China League One	26	0	0	0	-		1 (Note: Appearances in China League One play-offs)	1	27	1
Meixian Techand/ Guangdong South China Tiger	2019	China League One	28	4	0	0	-		-		28	4
Meixian Techand/ Guangdong South China Tiger	Total		54	4	0	0	0	0	1	1	55	5
Guangzhou R&F/ Guangzhou City	2020	Chinese Super League	9	0	0	0	-		-		9	0
Guangzhou R&F/ Guangzhou City	2021	Chinese Super League	3	0	0	0	-		-		3	0
Guangzhou R&F/ Guangzhou City	2022	Chinese Super League	0	0	0	0	-		-		0	0
Guangzhou R&F/ Guangzhou City	Total		12	0	0	0	0	0	0	0	12	0
Guangdong GZ-Power	2023	Chinese Champions League	12	0	-		-		-		12	0
Guangdong GZ-Power	2024	China League Two	22	1	1	0	-		-		23	1
Guangdong GZ-Power	2025	China League One	8	0	3	0	-		-		11	0
Guangdong GZ-Power	Total		42	1	4	0	0	0	0	0	46	1
Career total			193	10	12	1	0	0	1	1	206	12
