= Xiao Zhi (footballer) =

Chinese footballer

Xiao Zhi 肖智
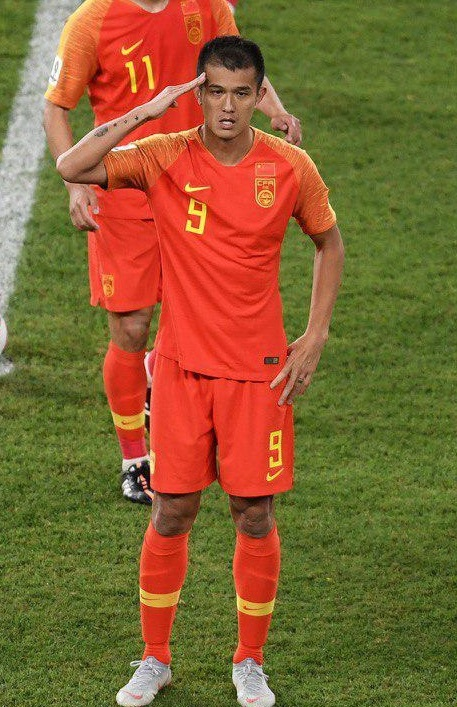
- Xiao Zhi with China at the 2019 AFC Asian Cup

Personal information
- Full name: Xiao Zhi
- Date of birth: May 28, 1985 (age 41)
- Place of birth: Luoyang, Henan, China
- Height: 1.87 m (6 ft 1 1/2 in)
- Positions: Striker; right midfielder

Team information
- Current team: Guangdong GZ-Power (assistant coach)

Youth career
- 1998–2001: Guangzhou Apollo
- 2002–2003: Shanghai COSCO Huili

Senior career*
Years	Team	Apps	(Gls)
2003–2006	Nanjing Yoyo	61	(17)
2007–2015	Henan Jianye	189	(23)
2016–2019	Guangzhou R&F	81	(21)
2020	Tianjin TEDA	11	(0)
2021	Hebei Zhuoao	8	(2)
2021–2022	Qingdao Hainiu	19	(4)
2022	→ Liaoning Shenyang Urban (loan)	17	(4)
2023–2024	Guangdong GZ-Power	37	(14)

International career^{‡}
2017-2019	China	17	(3)

Managerial career
- 2024–: Guangdong GZ-Power (assistant)
Medal record
Representing China
Men's football
EAFF Championship
Bronze medal – third place	2017 Japan	Team
- * Club domestic league appearances and goals as of January 1, 2026 ‡ National team caps and goals as of January 24, 2019

Xiao Zhi
- Chinese: 肖智
Transcriptions
Standard Mandarin
- Hanyu Pinyin: Xiāo Zhì
- IPA: [ɕjáʊ ʈʂɻ̩̂]

Xiao Zhi (Chinese: 肖智; pinyin: Xiāo Zhì; born on May 28, 1985) is a Chinese former professional footballer who plays as a striker and the current assistant coach of China League Two club Guangdong GZ-Power.

== Club career ==
Xiao Zhi started his football career with second-tier football club Nanjing Yoyo, where he would establish himself as a regular within the team before he was sold to his local football club Henan Jianye for 1.3 million Yuan. With his new club he would play within the top tier and make his debut for them on March 11, 2007, when he made his first league appearance against Beijing Guoan in a 0–0 draw. Due to his versatility to play as a winger or striker he would find significant playing time and score his first goal against Changchun Yatai on November 4, 2007, in a 3–2 victory. By the end of season he would make 23 league appearances and though these often came as a substitute he would still play a large part in Henan's establishment in the Chinese Super League.

On January 27, 2016, Xiao transferred to fellow Chinese Super League side Guangzhou R&F. He would make his debut in a league game against Hebei China Fortune F.C. on March 4, 2016, in a 2–1 defeat. In his first campaign he played 25 times in the league that season, scoring six goals. Xiao signed a contract extension with R&F on January 25, 2017.

On July 17, 2020, Xiao joined Tianjin TEDA. He would make his debut in a league game against Shanghai SIPG F.C. on July 27, 2020, in a game that ended in a 3–1 defeat.

On October 20, 2024, Xiao decided to retire from professional football after the last China League Two home game against Shaanxi Union

== International career ==
On June 7, 2017, Xiao made his debut and scored for the Chinese national team in an 8–1 win against Philippines.

== Career statistics ==
=== Club ===
Statistics accurate as of match played January 1, 2026.

Appearances and goals by club, season and competition
Club	Season	League			National Cup		Continental		Other		Total	
Club	Season	Division	Apps	Goals	Apps	Goals	Apps	Goals	Apps	Goals	Apps	Goals
Nanjing Yoyo	2003	Chinese Jia-B League	9	0			-		-		9	0
Nanjing Yoyo	2004	China League One	19	4	0	0	-		-		19	4
Nanjing Yoyo	2005	China League One	15	9	1	0	-		-		16	9
Nanjing Yoyo	2006	China League One	18	4	0	0	-		-		18	4
Nanjing Yoyo	Total		61	17	1	0	0	0	0	0	62	17
Henan Jianye	2007	Chinese Super League	24	1	-		-		-		24	1
Henan Jianye	2008	Chinese Super League	25	1	-		-		-		25	1
Henan Jianye	2009	Chinese Super League	28	7	-		-		-		28	7
Henan Jianye	2010	Chinese Super League	21	1	-		5	0	-		26	1
Henan Jianye	2011	Chinese Super League	16	2	1	0	-		-		17	2
Henan Jianye	2012	Chinese Super League	13	1	1	0	-		-		14	1
Henan Jianye	2013	China League One	29	6	2	0	-		-		31	6
Henan Jianye	2014	Chinese Super League	21	2	3	5	-		-		24	7
Henan Jianye	2015	Chinese Super League	12	2	0	0	-		-		12	2
Henan Jianye	Total		189	23	7	5	5	0	0	0	201	28
Guangzhou R&F	2016	Chinese Super League	25	6	4	1	-		-		29	7
Guangzhou R&F	2017	Chinese Super League	27	7	3	0	-		-		30	7
Guangzhou R&F	2018	Chinese Super League	23	7	4	1	-		-		27	8
Guangzhou R&F	2019	Chinese Super League	6	1	0	0	-		-		6	1
Guangzhou R&F	Total		81	21	11	2	0	0	0	0	92	23
Tianjin TEDA	2020	Chinese Super League	11	0	2	1	-		-		13	1
Hebei Zhuoao	2021	China League Two	8	2	0	0	-		-		8	2
Qingdao Hainiu	2021	China League Two	16	4	0	0	-		-		16	4
Qingdao Hainiu	2022	China League One	3	0	0	0	-		-		3	0
Qingdao Hainiu	Total		19	4	0	0	0	0	0	0	19	4
Liaoning Shenyang Urban (loan)	2022	China League One	17	4	0	0	-		-		17	4
Guangdong GZ-Power	2023	CMCL	14	11	-		-		-		14	11
Guangdong GZ-Power	2024	China League Two	23	3	1	0	-		-		24	3
Guangdong GZ-Power	Total		37	14	1	0	0	0	0	0	38	14
Career total			423	85	22	8	5	0	0	0	445	93

=== International ===
Appearances and goals by national team and year
National team	Year	Apps	Goals
China
China	2017	8	2
China	2018	7	0
China	2019	2	1
Total		17	3

Scores and results list China's goal tally first.

No	Date	Venue	Opponent	Score	Result	Competition
1.	June 7, 2017	Tianhe Stadium, Guangzhou, China	Philippines	2–0	8–1	Friendly
2.	September 5, 2017	Khalifa International Stadium, Doha, Qatar	Qatar	1–1	2–1	2018 FIFA World Cup qualification
3.	January 20, 2019	Hazza bin Zayed Stadium, Al Ain, United Arab Emirates	Thailand	1–1	2–1	2019 AFC Asian Cup

== Honours ==
=== Club ===
Henan Jianye

- China League One: 2013

Qingdao Hainiu

- China League Two: 2021
