= Jiang Zhipeng =

Chinese footballer

Jiang Zhipeng 姜至鹏
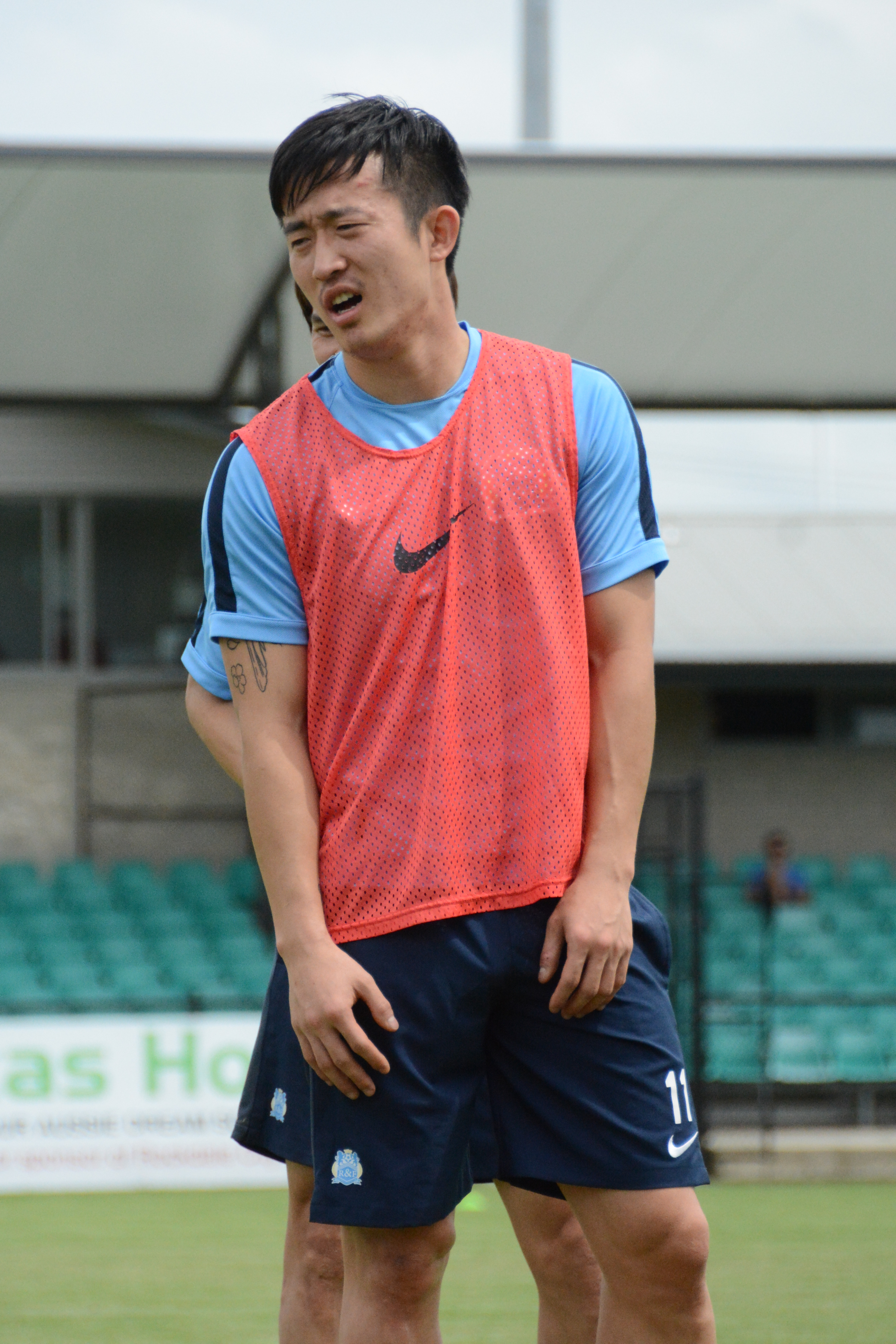

Personal information
- Full name: Jiang Zhipeng
- Date of birth: 6 March 1989 (age 37)
- Place of birth: Qingdao, Shandong, China
- Height: 1.78 m (5 ft 10 in)
- Position: Left-back

Team information
- Current team: Shenzhen Peng City
- Number: 4

Youth career
- 2000–2005: Genbao Football Academy

Senior career*
Years	Team	Apps	(Gls)
2006–2010	Shanghai East Asia	53	(6)
2011–2013	Shanghai Shenxin	85	(1)
2014–2017	Guangzhou R&F	108	(3)
2018–2019	Hebei China Fortune	56	(2)
2020–2023	Shenzhen FC	67	(2)
2023–2024	Wuhan Three Towns	31	(2)
2025–	Shenzhen Peng City	44	(2)

International career^{‡}
2013–	China	26	(0)
Medal record
Representing China
Men's football
EAFF Championship
Bronze medal – third place	2019 South Korea	Team
- * Club domestic league appearances and goals as of 22 November 2026 ‡ National team caps and goals as of 15 December 2019

Jiang Zhipeng
- Simplified Chinese: 姜至鹏
- Traditional Chinese: 姜至鵬
Transcriptions
Standard Mandarin
- Hanyu Pinyin: Jiāng Zhìpéng
- IPA: [tɕjáŋ ʈʂɻ̩̂ pʰə̌ŋ]

Jiang Zhipeng (Chinese: 姜至鹏; pinyin: Jiāng Zhìpéng; born 6 March 1989) is a Chinese professional footballer who currently plays as a left-back for Chinese Super League club Shenzhen Peng City.

== Club career ==
Jiang Zhipeng started his football career when he joined the Genbao Football Academy in 2000 and was promoted to Shanghai East Asia's first team in the 2006 season. On 10 December 2010, Jiang transferred to top tier side Nanchang Hengyuan along with Wang Jiayu for a total fee of ¥6 million. He scored his first goal for the club on 24 September 2011 in a 5-2 loss against Shandong Luneng. Jiang made 28 league appearances in the 2011 season which secured Nanchang's stay in the top tier for the 2012 season. He followed the club when the club decided to move to Shanghai in 2012 and they rebranded themselves as Shanghai Shenxin.

On 29 January 2014, Jiang transferred to fellow Chinese Super League side Guangzhou R&F. He made his debut for the club in a league game on 9 March 2014 in a 1-1 draw against Tianjin Teda. By the end of the 2014 season, he had established himself as a vital member within the team and helped guide Guangzhou R&F to their highest ever position of third within the league and qualification for the AFC Champions League for the first time in the club's history.

On 22 February 2018, Jiang transferred to fellow top tier side Hebei China Fortune. He made his debut in a 1-1 draw against Tianjin TEDA F.C. on 3 March 2018 in the opening league game of the season.

After two seasons with the club he joined another top tier club in Shenzhen on 16 July 2020. He would go on to make his debut in a 3-0 victory against Guangzhou R&F in the opening league game on 26 July 2020.

On 10 January 2025, Jiang joined fellow Chinese Super League club Shenzhen Peng City on a free transfer.

== International career ==
Jiang made his debut for the Chinese national team on 6 June 2013 in a 2-1 loss against Uzbekistan. Then manager Alain Perrin decided to call him up for the 2015 AFC Asian Cup where Jiang played in all of China's games as they were knocked out in the quarter-finals by Australia.

== Personal life ==
On 29 March 2017, after Jiang messed up a headed clearance in a 2018 FIFA World Cup qualification match that gifted Iran the decisive goal in a 1-0 loss, Jiang's ex-wife Zhang Zhiyue claimed that Jiang had an extramarital affair for nearly three-and-a-half-years out of their four-year marriage. Jiang made a statement on 30 March 2017 that their divorce was due to alienation of mutual affection instead of an extramarital affair.

== Career statistics ==
=== Club statistics ===
As of 31 October 2025.

Appearances and goals by club, season and competition
Club	Season	League			National Cup		Continental		Other		Total	
Club	Season	Division	Apps	Goals	Apps	Goals	Apps	Goals	Apps	Goals	Apps	Goals
Shanghai East Asia	2006	China League Two			-		-		-			
Shanghai East Asia	2007	China League Two			-		-		-			
Shanghai East Asia	2008	China League One	13	1	-		-		-		13	1
Shanghai East Asia	2009	China League One	21	5	-		-		-		21	5
Shanghai East Asia	2010	China League One	19	0	-		-		-		19	0
Shanghai East Asia	Total		53	6	0	0	0	0	0	0	53	6
Shanghai Shenxin	2011	Chinese Super League	28	1	2	1	-		-		30	2
Shanghai Shenxin	2012	Chinese Super League	28	0	0	0	-		-		28	0
Shanghai Shenxin	2013	Chinese Super League	29	0	1	0	-		-		30	0
Shanghai Shenxin	Total		85	1	3	1	0	0	0	0	88	2
Guangzhou R&F	2014	Chinese Super League	29	1	2	0	-		-		31	1
Guangzhou R&F	2015	Chinese Super League	25	1	1	0	7	1	-		33	2
Guangzhou R&F	2016	Chinese Super League	26	1	5	0	-		-		31	1
Guangzhou R&F	2017	Chinese Super League	28	0	3	0	-		-		31	0
Guangzhou R&F	Total		108	3	11	0	7	1	0	0	126	4
Hebei China Fortune	2018	Chinese Super League	29	1	2	0	-		-		31	1
Hebei China Fortune	2019	Chinese Super League	27	1	0	0	-		-		27	1
Hebei China Fortune	Total		56	2	2	0	0	0	0	0	58	2
Shenzhen FC	2020	Chinese Super League	18	0	1	0	-		-		19	0
Shenzhen FC	2021	Chinese Super League	19	0	0	0	-		-		19	0
Shenzhen FC	2022	Chinese Super League	18	1	0	0	-		-		18	1
Shenzhen FC	2023	Chinese Super League	12	1	0	0	-		-		12	1
Shenzhen FC	Total		67	2	1	0	0	0	0	0	68	2
Wuhan Three Towns	2023	Chinese Super League	8	0	-		6	0	-		14	0
Wuhan Three Towns	2024	Chinese Super League	23	2	0	0	-		-		23	2
Wuhan Three Towns	Total		31	2	0	0	6	0	0	0	37	2
Shenzhen Peng City	2025	Chinese Super League	24	0	1	0	-		-		25	0
Career total			424	16	18	1	13	1	0	0	455	18

=== International statistics ===
National team
Year	Apps	Goals
2013	1	0
2014	5	0
2015	8	0
2016	3	0
2017	6	0
2018	1	0
2019	2	0
Total	26	0

== Honours ==
=== Club ===
Shanghai East Asia

- China League Two: 2007

=== Individual ===
- Chinese Super League Team of the Year: 2016, 2017

Sporting positions
Preceded by Zhang Yaokun	Guangzhou R&F F.C. captain 2017	Succeeded by Yi Teng
