= 40th Anniversary of the Shenzhen Special Economic Zone =

Anniversary celebrations

Celebration of the 40th Anniversary of the Establishment of Shenzhen Special Economic Zone
- Native name: 深圳经济特区建立40周年庆祝大会
- Date: 14 October 2020
- Location: Shenzhen, Guangdong, China
- Motive: Commemoration of the 40th of the founding of the Shenzhen Special Economic Zone in August 1980
- Organised by: Chinese Communist Party; • Xi Jinping (General Secretary); • Li Xi (Party Secretary of Guangdong and host)
- Participants: Chinese Communist Party, Government of China

Celebrations of the 40th Anniversary of the establishment of the Shenzhen Special Economic Zone were held on 14 October 2020 to celebrate the 40th anniversary of the founding of the Shenzhen Special Economic Zone.

== Background ==
In August 2019, the CCP Central Committee and the State Council decided to support Shenzhen in building a pilot demonstration zone for socialism with Chinese characteristics. In October 2020, the CCP General Office and the General Office of the State Council issued the "Implementation Plan for the Comprehensive Reform Pilot of Shenzhen to Build a Pilot Demonstration Zone for Socialism with Chinese Characteristics (2020-2025)" and issued a notice requiring all regions and departments to implement it. It stated that in the past 40 years, Shenzhen "has dared to take risks, dare to be the first, and work hard, creating a miracle in the history of development and becoming a banner of China's reform and opening up".

Wang Weizhong, the Party Secretary of Shenzhen, said that "Shenzhen companies have never grown up in a smooth sailing", and expressed support for the central government's deployment of Shenzhen to build a model city of a socialist modern power by 2035, saying that Shenzhen will build a model city of a socialist modern power 15 years ahead of the rest of the country.

On October 12, the Hong Kong Chief Executive Carrie Lam, announced that she would postpone the delivery of the Policy Address to the Hong Kong Legislative Council on October 14 to lead a delegation to Shenzhen to attend the Shenzhen celebration meeting.

== Events ==
On October 13, 2020, CCP General Secretary and President Xi Jinping visited the Kaifu Culture Exhibition Hall and the Overseas Chinese Letters Museum in the Xiaogongyuan Kaifu District of the Shantou Special Economic Zone, and then visited the streets of the Kaifu District to interact with the public.

At 10:30 am on October 14, 2020, the celebration meeting for the 40th anniversary of the establishment of the Shenzhen Special Economic Zone began at the Qianhai International Conference Center. The 826 seats filled at the venue symbolized the establishment of the Special Economic Zone on August 26, 1980. Politburo member and Guangdong Party Secretary Li Xi presided over the meeting. Xi Jinping, Vice Premier Han Zheng, Politburo members Ding Xuexiang, Liu He, Chen Xi and Huang Kunming, and the current and former Chief Executives of the Hong Kong and Macau attended the meeting. Speakers at the meeting included Shenzhen Party Secretary Wang Weizhong, Chen Zhilie, chairman of the Board of Directors of Yanxiong High-tech Group, and Lu Jianxin, Chief Engineer of the South China Region of China Construction Science and Engineering Group. At the end, Xi Jinping delivered a keynote speech, proposing "continue to unswervingly follow the path of reform and opening up", saying that "Shenzhen is a wonderful interpretation of socialism with Chinese characteristics on a blank sheet of paper", and summarized " the 40 years of reform and opening up and innovative development of the special economic zones have accumulated ten valuable experiences". That afternoon, Xi arrived at Shenzhen Lianhuashan Park and presented a wreath to the bronze statue of Deng Xiaoping, expressing his high respect and deep remembrance for Deng. This was also the second time since his southern tour in 2012 that he went to Lianhuashan Park to present a wreath to the statue of Deng.

On the occasion of the 40th anniversary of the establishment of the Shenzhen Special Economic Zone, the CCP Shenzhen Municipal Committee and the Shenzhen Municipal People's Government decided to commend 40 "innovative and entrepreneurial figures and advanced model figures for the 40th anniversary of the establishment of the Shenzhen Special Economic Zone".

List of 40 people honored
Name	Position
Wan Jie	Chairman of Artron Culture Group
Ma Huateng	Chairman and CEO of Tencent
Ma Mingzhe	Chairman of Ping An Insurance
Ma Weihua	Former President of China Merchants Bank
Wang Wei	Chairman of SF Express
Wang Chuanfu	Chairman and President of BYD Company
Ye Qing	Party Secretary and Chairman of Shenzhen Academy of Building Sciences
Feng Guanping	Former Dean of Shenzhen Tsinghua University Research Institute
Liu Xiaochun	Party Secretary and President of Shenzhen Court of International Arbitration
Liu Lei	Party Secretary and President of the Third People's Hospital of Shenzhen
Sun Xizhuo	President of Shenzhen Luohu Hospital Group
Sun Lei	Chief Designer of FIYTA
Li Xiting	Chairman of Mindray
Li Yi	Chairman of Shenzhen Appotronics
Li Zexiang	Professor of Hong Kong University of Science and Technology, Chairman of Googol Technology (Shenzhen)
Li Jianquan	Chairman of Winner Medical
Yang Feifei	Technical Manager of Futaihua Industrial (Shenzhen)
Wu Fenghua	Founder and Creative Director of TTF High-end Jewelry Brand, Shenzhen Tongtaifu Jewelry
Shen Qingfang	Chairman and CEO of Pengding Holdings (Shenzhen)
Lu Jianxin	Chief Engineer of South China Region, China Construction Science and Engineering Group
Chen Ning	Chairman and CEO of Shenzhen Intellifusion Technology
Chen Zhilie	Chairman of the Board of Directors of EVOC High-Tech Holdings Group
Jin Xuzhi	CEO of TCL China Star Optoelectronics Technology
Zhou Chuangbin	Senior expert in special tests at CGN Engineering
Zhao Xinzhu	Chairman of Shenzhen Zhongyi Group
Zhao Huizhou	Artis Fashion Group (Shenzhen). Founder and Chief Designer of Artis brand
Gordon Wu	Chairman of Hopewell Holdings
Yu Guogang	Former Deputy General Manager of Shenzhen Stock Exchange (Legal Representative)
Yuan Geng	Former Executive Vice Chairman of China Merchants Group and former Director of the Shekou Industrial Zone Management Committee
Xu Yangsheng	President of The Chinese University of Hong Kong, Shenzhen, Academician of Chinese Academy of Engineering
Gao Yunfeng	Chairman and General Manager of Han's Laser
Guo Liying	Director of Shenzhen Phoenix Nirvana Art Troupe
Huang Sanwen	Director and Researcher of Shenzhen Agricultural Genomics Institute, Chinese Academy of Agricultural Sciences
Howard Huang	Chairman of Orbbec in Shenzhen
Cao Yan	Party Secretary and Principal of Shenzhen Yuanping Special Education School
Gong Guoxiang	Former principal of Shenzhen Foreign Language School
Jiang Kairu	Creator of Shenzhen Luohu District Federation of Literary and Art Circles
Lu Xianping	Chairman and General Manager of Shenzhen Chipscreen Biotech
Fan Jianping	President and Researcher of Shenzhen Institutes of Advanced Technology, Chinese Academy of Sciences
Huo Dawei	Senior Consultant of Huawei's 2012 Laboratory Mentor Department

== See also ==
- 30th Anniversary of Development and Opening Up of Pudong
