= 2017 Chinese Super League =

Chinese Super League
- Season: 2017
- Dates: 3 March – 4 November 2017
- Champions: Guangzhou Evergrande Taobao (7th title)
- Relegated: Yanbian Funde; Liaoning Whowin
- AFC Champions League: Guangzhou Evergrande Taobao; Shanghai Greenland Shenhua; Shanghai SIPG; Tianjin Quanjian
- Matches: 240
- Goals: 732 (3.05 per match)
- Top goalscorer: (Israel) Eran Zahavi (27 goals)
- Biggest home win: Shanghai Greenland Shenhua 8–1 Liaoning Whowin (30 June 2017)
- Biggest away win: Yanbian Funde 0–4 Chongqing Dangdai Lifan (8 July 2017); Yanbian Funde 0–4 Jiangsu Suning (19 August 2017); Tianjin TEDA 1–5 Changchun Yatai (15 September 2017)
- Highest scoring: Shanghai Greenland Shenhua 8–1 Liaoning Whowin (30 June 2017); Shandong Luneng Taishan 5–4 Hebei China Fortune (3 November 2017)
- Longest winning run: 10 matches Guangzhou Evergrande Taobao
- Longest unbeaten run: 12 matches Guangzhou Evergrande Taobao
- Longest winless run: 11 matches Liaoning Whowin
- Longest losing run: 7 matches Liaoning Whowin
- Highest attendance: 54,018; Beijing Sinobo Guoan 2–0 Guangzhou Evergrande Taobao (8 July 2017)
- Lowest attendance: 0 (Note: Guizhou Zhicheng played their first home match behind closed doors due to breaches of the Chinese Football Association Regulations in the last home match of 2016 season.); Guizhou Hengfeng Zhicheng 1–1 Liaoning Whowin (3 March 2017)
- Average attendance: 23,766

The 2017 Ping An Chinese Football Association Super League (Chinese: 2017中国平安中国足球协会超级联赛) was the 14th season since the establishment of the Chinese Super League. The league title sponsor is Ping An Insurance. Guangzhou Evergrande Taobao won their seventh consecutive title of the league.

This season witnessed a huge change in the regulation to the players. Only three foreign players can play at one game and at least two domestic players who are under the age of 23 (born on or after 1 January 1994) must be in the 18-man list, including at least one must be in the starting list.

== Club changes ==
Clubs promoted from 2016 China League One

- Tianjin Quanjian
- Guizhou Hengfeng Zhicheng

Clubs relegated to 2017 China League One

- Hangzhou Greentown
- Shijiazhuang Ever Bright

Tianjin Quanjian and Guizhou Hengfeng Zhicheng both compete in the Chinese Super League for the first time in their respective histories. Hangzhou Greentown were relegated after a 10-year spell in the Chinese top-flight, while Shijiazhuang Ever Bright were relegated to China League One after spending 2 seasons in the Chinese Super League.

=== Name changes ===
- Beijing Guoan changed their name to Beijing Sinobo Guoan in January 2017.
- Chongqing Lifan changed their name to Chongqing Dangdai Lifan in January 2017.

== Clubs ==
=== Clubs and locations ===
Team	Head coach	City	Stadium	Capacity	Previous season
Guangzhou Evergrande Taobao	(Brazil) Luiz Felipe Scolari	Guangzhou	Tianhe Stadium	58,500	1st
Jiangsu Suning	(Italy) Fabio Capello	Nanjing	Nanjing Olympic Sports Centre	61,443	2nd
Shanghai SIPG	(Portugal) André Villas-Boas	Shanghai	Shanghai Stadium	56,842	3rd
Shanghai Greenland Shenhua	(China) Wu Jingui	Shanghai	Hongkou Football Stadium	33,060	4th
Beijing Sinobo Guoan	(Germany) Roger Schmidt	Beijing	Workers' Stadium	66,161	5th
Guangzhou R&F	(Serbia) Dragan Stojković	Guangzhou	Yuexiushan Stadium	18,000	6th
Guangzhou R&F	(Serbia) Dragan Stojković	Guangzhou	Guangdong Provincial People's Stadium (Note: The original home stadium of Guangzhou R&F, Yuexiushan Stadium, is under renovation. It is unusable until April 2017. So, in the first 2 round of Chinese Super League, Guangzhou R&F had to go to Guangdong Provincial People's Stadium as their home stadium instead. They moved back to Yuexiushan Stadium since Round 7 of the Super league.)	9,000	6th
Hebei China Fortune	(Chile) Manuel Pellegrini	Qinhuangdao	Qinhuangdao Olympic Sports Center Stadium	33,572	7th
Chongqing Dangdai Lifan	(South Korea) Chang Woe-ryong	Chongqing	Chongqing Olympic Sports Center	58,680	8th
Yanbian Funde	(South Korea) Park Tae-ha	Yanji	Yanji Stadium	30,000	9th
Liaoning Whowin	(China) Zhao Junzhe (caretaker)	Shenyang	Shenyang Olympic Sports Center Stadium	60,000	10th
Liaoning Whowin	(China) Zhao Junzhe (caretaker)	Shenyang	Tiexi New District Sports Center (Note: The original home stadium of Liaoning Whowin, Shenyang Olympic Sports Center Stadium, will host other events. So, Liaoning Whowin will play at the Tiexi New District Sports Center for the rest of the season.)	30,000	10th
Tianjin TEDA	(Germany) Uli Stielike	Tianjin	Tianjin Tuanbo Football Stadium (Note: The original home stadium of Tianjin Teda, Tianjin Olympic Centre, is under renovation for the 2017 National Games of China. On 28 March 2017, Tianjin TEDA changed their home stadium to Tianjin Tuanbo Football Stadium for the 2017 season.)	22,320	11th
Tianjin TEDA	(Germany) Uli Stielike	Tianjin	Tianjin Olympic Centre (Note: On 6 September 2017, it's confirmed that Tianjin Teda would move back to Tianjin Olympic Centre after 15 September since the 2017 National Games of China has finished.)	54,696	11th
Changchun Yatai	(China) Chen Jingang	Changchun	Development Area Stadium	25,000	12th
Henan Jianye	(China) Guo Guangqi	Zhengzhou	Hanghai Stadium	29,860	13th
Shandong Luneng Taishan	(Germany) Felix Magath	Jinan	Jinan Olympic Sports Center Stadium	56,808	14th
Tianjin Quanjian ^{P}	(Italy) Fabio Cannavaro	Tianjin	Haihe Educational Football Stadium	30,000	CL1, 1st
Guizhou Hengfeng Zhicheng ^{P}	(Spain) Gregorio Manzano	Guiyang	Guiyang Olympic Sports Center	51,636	CL1, 2nd

Location of teams in 2017 Chinese Super League

=== Managerial changes ===
Team	Outgoing manager	Date of vacancy	Incoming manager	Date of appointment
Shanghai SIPG	(Sweden) Sven-Göran Eriksson	4 November 2016	(Portugal) André Villas-Boas	4 November 2016
Shanghai Shenhua	(Spain) Gregorio Manzano	9 November 2016	(Uruguay) Gus Poyet	29 November 2016
Beijing Sinobo Guoan	(China) Xie Feng (caretaker)	23 November 2016	(Spain) José González	23 November 2016
Changchun Yatai	(South Korea) Lee Jang-soo	4 May 2017	(China) Chen Jingang (caretaker)	4 May 2017
Guizhou Hengfeng Zhicheng	(China) Li Bing	8 May 2017	(Spain) Gregorio Manzano	8 May 2017
Tianjin TEDA	(Portugal) Jaime Pacheco	30 May 2017	(South Korea) Lee Lim-saeng (caretaker)	30 May 2017
Jiangsu Suning	(South Korea) Choi Yong-soo	1 June 2017	(China) Li Jinyu (caretaker)	1 June 2017
Beijing Guoan	(Spain) José González	2 June 2017	(China) Xie Feng (caretaker)	2 June 2017
Henan Jianye	(China) Jia Xiuquan	3 June 2017	(Bulgaria) Yasen Petrov	13 June 2017
Jiangsu Suning	(China) Li Jinyu (caretaker)	11 June 2017	(Italy) Fabio Capello	11 June 2017
Beijing Guoan	(China) Xie Feng (caretaker)	1 July 2017	(Germany) Roger Schmidt	1 July 2017
Tianjin TEDA	(South Korea) Lee Lim-saeng (caretaker)	7 July 2017	(South Korea) Lee Lim-saeng	7 July 2017
Liaoning Whowin	(China) Ma Lin	1 August 2017	(France) René Lobello	1 August 2017
Tianjin TEDA	(South Korea) Lee Lim-saeng	14 August 2017	(China) Chi Rongliang (caretaker)	14 August 2017
Tianjin TEDA	(China) Chi Rongliang (caretaker)	9 September 2017	(Germany) Uli Stielike	9 September 2017
Shanghai Shenhua	(Uruguay) Gus Poyet	11 September 2017	(China) Wu Jingui	11 September 2017
Liaoning Whowin	(France) René Lobello	29 September 2017	(China) Zhao Junzhe (caretaker)	29 September 2017
Henan Jianye	(Bulgaria) Yasen Petrov	30 September 2017	(China) Guo Guangqi	30 September 2017

== Foreign players ==
A club may register seven foreign players per season. However, only five foreign players could be registered at any given time. And to curtail their influence, only three foreign players may play per match.

- Players name in **bold** indicates the players that were registered during the mid-season transfer window.
- Players name in italics indicates the players that were out of squad or left their respective clubs during the mid-season transfer window.

Club	Player 1	Player 2	Player 3	Player 4	AFC player	Former players
Beijing Sinobo Guoan	(Brazil) Ralf	(Brazil) Renato Augusto	(Spain) Jonathan Soriano		(Uzbekistan) Egor Krimets	(Turkey) Burak Yılmaz
Changchun Yatai	(Brazil) Bruno Meneghel	(Brazil) Marinho	(Hungary) Szabolcs Huszti	(Nigeria) Odion Ighalo	(Uzbekistan) Anzur Ismailov	
Chongqing Dangdai Lifan	(Brazil) Alan Kardec	(Brazil) Fernandinho	(Brazil) Hyuri	(Croatia) Goran Milović	(South Korea) Jung Woo-young	
Guangzhou Evergrande Taobao	(Brazil) Alan	(Brazil) **Muriqui**	(Brazil) Ricardo Goulart		(South Korea) **Kim Young-gwon**	(Brazil) Paulinho (Colombia) Jackson Martínez (South Korea) Kim Hyung-il
Guangzhou R&F	(Brazil) Júnior Urso	(Brazil) Renatinho	(Iceland) **Sölvi Ottesen**	(Israel) Eran Zahavi	(Australia) Apostolos Giannou	(South Korea) Jang Hyun-soo
Guizhou Hengfeng Zhicheng	(Croatia) Nikica Jelavić	(Netherlands) Tjaronn Chery	(Spain) **Mario Suárez**	(Spain) **Rubén Castro**		(Australia) Ryan McGowan (Egypt) Ali Ghazal (Kenya) Michael Olunga
Hebei China Fortune	(Argentina) Ezequiel Lavezzi	(Brazil) Aloísio	(Cameroon) Stéphane Mbia	(Ivory Coast) **Gervinho**	(South Korea) Kim Ju-young	(Brazil) Hernanes
Henan Jianye	(Cameroon) Christian Bassogog	(Czech Republic) Bořek Dočkal	(Guinea-Bissau) Eddi Gomes	(Portugal) **Ricardo Vaz Tê**	(Syria) Ahmad Al Salih	(Philippines) Javier Patiño
Jiangsu Suning	(Brazil) Alex Teixeira	(Brazil) Ramires	(Cameroon) **Benjamin Moukandjo**	(Colombia) Roger Martínez	(Australia) Trent Sainsbury	(South Korea) Hong Jeong-ho
Liaoning Whowin	(Cameroon) **Christian Bekamenga**	(Cameroon) **Olivier Boumal**	(Democratic Republic of the Congo) Assani Lukimya	(Nigeria) Anthony Ujah		(Australia) James Holland (Australia) Robbie Kruse (Zambia) James Chamanga
Shandong Luneng Taishan	(Brazil) Diego Tardelli	(Brazil) Gil	(Italy) Graziano Pellè	(Senegal) Papiss Cissé		
Shanghai Greenland Shenhua	(Argentina) Carlos Tevez	(Colombia) Fredy Guarín	(Colombia) Giovanni Moreno	(Nigeria) Obafemi Martins	(South Korea) Kim Kee-hee	
Shanghai SIPG	(Brazil) Elkeson	(Brazil) Hulk	(Brazil) Oscar	(Portugal) Ricardo Carvalho	(Uzbekistan) Odil Ahmedov	
Tianjin Quanjian	(Belgium) Axel Witsel	(Brazil) Alexandre Pato	(France) **Anthony Modeste**		(South Korea) Kwon Kyung-won	(Brazil) Geuvânio (Brazil) Júnior Moraes
Tianjin TEDA	(Ghana) **Frank Acheampong**	(Nigeria) Mikel John Obi	(Senegal) Mbaye Diagne	(Serbia) Nemanja Gudelj	(South Korea) Hwang Seok-ho	(Nigeria) Brown Ideye
Yanbian Funde	(Albania) **Valdet Rama**	(The Gambia) Bubacarr Trawally	(Hungary) Richárd Guzmics	(Serbia) Nikola Petković	(South Korea) **Hwang Il-su**	(South Korea) Kim Seung-dae (South Korea) Yoon Bit-garam

Last updated: 19 June 2017.
Source: sports.ifeng.com (in Chinese)

- **^1** Foreign players who left their clubs or were sent to reserve team after first half of the season.

Hong Kong/Macau/Taiwan outfield players (Contracts signed before 1 January 2016 do not count towards foreign or Asian player slots.)

Club	Player 1	Player 2
Changchun Yatai	(Chinese Taipei) Yaki Yen	(Hong Kong) Jack Sealy
Guizhou Hengfeng Zhicheng	(Hong Kong) Au Yeung Yiu Chung	(Hong Kong) Festus Baise
Tianjin Quanjian	(Hong Kong) Jean-Jacques Kilama	

Last updated: 1 November 2016

== League table ==
Pos	Team	Pld	W	D	L	GF	GA	GD	Pts	Qualification or relegation
1	Guangzhou Evergrande Taobao (C)	30	20	4	6	69	42	+27	64	Qualification to Champions League group stage
2	Shanghai SIPG	30	17	7	6	72	39	+33	58	Qualification to Champions League play-off round
3	Tianjin Quanjian	30	15	9	6	46	33	+13	54	Qualification to Champions League play-off round
4	Hebei China Fortune	30	15	7	8	55	38	+17	52	
5	Guangzhou R&F	30	15	7	8	59	46	+13	52	
6	Shandong Luneng Taishan	30	13	10	7	49	33	+16	49	
7	Changchun Yatai	30	12	8	10	46	41	+5	44	
8	Guizhou Hengfeng Zhicheng	30	12	6	12	39	45	−6	42	
9	Beijing Sinobo Guoan	30	11	7	12	42	42	0	40	
10	Chongqing Dangdai Lifan	30	9	9	12	37	40	−3	36	
11	Shanghai Greenland Shenhua (Note: Shanghai Greenland Shenhua qualified for the 2018 AFC Champions League group stage as 2017 Chinese FA Cup winners.)	30	9	8	13	52	55	−3	35	Qualification to Champions League group stage
12	Jiangsu Suning	30	7	11	12	40	45	−5	32	
13	Tianjin TEDA	30	8	7	15	30	49	−19	31	
14	Henan Jianye	30	7	9	14	34	46	−12	30	
15	Yanbian Funde (R)	30	5	7	18	32	64	−32	22	Relegation to League One
16	Liaoning Whowin (R)	30	4	6	20	30	74	−44	18	Relegation to League One

Source: League table
Rules for classification: 1) Points; 2) Head-to-head points; 3) Head-to-head goal difference; 4) Head-to-head goals scored; 5) Reserve league points; 6) Goal difference; 7) Goals scored; 8) Disciplinary points (1 point for each yellow card, 3 points for each red card); 9) Draw
(C) Champions; (R) Relegated

== Results ==
Home \ Away	BJ	CC	CQ	GZE	GZF	GZZ	HBC	HN	JSS	LN	SD	SGS	SSI	TJQ	TJ	YB
Beijing Sinobo Guoan		1–2	1–0	2–0	2–2	2–0	1–4	1–0	0–0	4–0	2–2	2–1	0–1	1–1	2–0	4–4
Changchun Yatai	2–1		3–1	0–1	3–2	1–1	0–0	1–0	3–1	1–1	0–2	2–3	4–2	1–1	1–1	1–1
Chongqing Dangdai Lifan	1–0	1–1		2–2	0–2	2–1	1–1	2–3	1–2	2–0	1–0	1–1	1–1	0–1	2–1	0–0
Guangzhou Evergrande Taobao	2–1	3–1	2–0		2–2	5–1	2–0	2–1	2–1	2–1	2–1	3–2	3–2	1–2	3–0	4–3
Guangzhou R&F	2–1	1–0	3–4	4–2		1–3	1–1	3–2	4–2	4–1	1–1	0–0	1–1	2–0	3–2	6–2
Guizhou Hengfeng Zhicheng	1–1	2–3	1–0	0–2	2–0		4–3	2–1	2–2	1–1	3–0	0–2	2–1	2–1	0–0	1–2
Hebei China Fortune	2–0	2–1	1–2	3–0	2–1	1–0		2–3	3–2	2–0	0–0	4–2	2–2	1–0	4–0	3–0
Henan Jianye	0–2	0–2	0–0	2–4	1–1	0–1	0–0		1–1	1–1	2–1	0–0	2–4	1–1	0–0	3–1
Jiangsu Suning	1–0	0–1	1–2	2–2	1–2	0–1	1–2	2–2		4–0	2–1	2–2	0–1	1–0	0–0	1–1
Liaoning Whowin	2–4	1–0	2–1	0–3	1–4	0–1	1–2	1–2	3–1		0–3	1–4	3–3	1–2	1–1	3–1
Shandong Luneng Taishan	1–0	3–2	1–1	2–1	3–0	2–2	5–4	3–2	0–0	3–1		5–0	2–1	1–2	2–0	1–1
Shanghai Greenland Shenhua	1–2	1–1	2–2	0–3	3–1	0–3	3–2	1–2	4–0	8–1	0–0		1–3	1–1	1–2	5–1
Shanghai SIPG	5–1	5–1	3–2	2–2	1–2	3–0	3–0	4–1	2–3	4–1	2–1	6–1		0–0	3–1	2–0
Tianjin Quanjian	2–2	1–3	2–1	4–3	2–1	3–1	2–1	1–0	2–2	4–1	0–0	3–0	1–1		3–0	1–0
Tianjin TEDA	2–0	1–5	2–0	0–3	1–2	3–1	0–2	1–0	1–1	1–1	0–2	2–1	0–1	4–1		3–1
Yanbian Funde	1–2	1–0	0–4	1–3	0–1	3–0	1–1	1–2	0–4	1–0	1–1	0–2	1–3	0–2	3–1	

Updated to match(es) played on 4 November 2017. Source: Results
Legend: Blue = home team win; Yellow = draw; Red = away team win.

== Positions by round ==
To preserve chronological evolvements, any postponed matches are not included to the round at which they were originally scheduled, but added to the full round they were played immediately afterwards. For example, if a match is scheduled for round 7, but then played between rounds 8 and 9, it will be added to the standings for round 8.

Team ╲ Round	1	2	3	4	5	6	7	8	9	10	11	12	13	14	15	16	17	18	19	20	21	22	23	24	25	26	27	28	29	30
Guangzhou Evergrande Taobao	5	5	3	5	3	3	1	1	1	1	1	1	1	1	1	1	1	1	1	1	1	1	1	1	1	1	1	1	1	1
Shanghai SIPG	1	1	4	2	4	2	3	2	2	2	2	2	2	2	2	2	2	2	2	2	2	2	2	2	2	2	2	2	2	2
Tianjin Quanjian	13	12	10	7	7	8	9	9	10	7	6	6	6	6	4	4	3	3	3	3	3	4	5	4	4	4	4	4	4	3
Hebei China Fortune	8	10	6	4	5	6	5	5	4	3	3	3	3	3	3	3	4	5	7	6	6	5	3	3	3	3	3	3	3	4
Guangzhou R&F	3	3	2	1	1	1	2	4	3	4	5	5	5	5	6	6	8	8	6	5	4	6	6	7	6	6	6	6	5	5
Shandong Luneng Taishan	3	2	1	3	2	4	4	3	5	5	4	4	4	4	5	5	5	4	4	4	5	3	4	5	5	5	5	5	6	6
Changchun Yatai	15	16	16	15	16	12	14	11	15	13	13	13	13	11	10	10	9	9	10	11	10	10	10	10	10	10	9	9	8	7
Guizhou Hengfeng Zhicheng	6	6	11	12	12	14	11	14	11	8	8	8	9	10	11	11	11	10	11	10	9	9	8	9	8	7	7	8	7	8
Beijing Sinobo Guoan	12	11	8	6	8	9	6	6	6	6	7	7	7	7	7	7	6	6	5	7	7	7	7	6	7	8	8	7	9	9
Chongqing Dangdai Lifan	8	8	13	10	6	7	8	8	8	12	12	11	8	9	9	8	7	7	8	8	8	8	9	8	9	9	10	10	10	10
Shanghai Greenland Shenhua	2	4	7	11	9	5	7	7	7	9	10	12	12	8	8	9	10	11	9	9	11	11	11	12	11	11	11	12	11	11
Jiangsu Suning	16	15	15	16	15	16	16	16	14	14	14	14	15	15	16	15	15	14	13	13	13	13	13	13	13	13	13	14	13	12
Tianjin TEDA	13	14	9	9	11	10	10	10	12	10	11	9	10	12	12	13	13	13	15	15	15	15	15	15	15	14	14	13	14	13
Henan Jianye	8	9	12	13	13	13	15	13	13	15	15	15	14	14	14	12	12	12	12	12	12	12	12	11	12	12	12	11	12	14
Yanbian Funde	8	13	14	14	14	15	13	15	16	16	16	16	16	16	15	16	16	16	16	16	16	16	16	16	16	15	15	15	15	15
Liaoning Whowin	6	7	5	8	10	11	12	12	9	11	9	10	11	13	13	14	14	15	14	14	14	14	14	14	14	16	16	16	16	16

Leader and qualification to AFC Champions League group stage
Qualification to AFC Champions League play-off round
Relegation to League One

Source: League table

== Statistics ==
As of 4 November 2017

=== Top scorers ===
Rank	Player	Club	Goals
1	(Israel) Eran Zahavi	Guangzhou R&F	27
2	(Argentina) Ezequiel Lavezzi	Hebei China Fortune	20
2	(Brazil) Ricardo Goulart	Guangzhou Evergrande Taobao	20
2	(China) Wu Lei	Shanghai SIPG	20
5	(The Gambia) Bubacarr Trawally	Yanbian Funde	18
6	(Brazil) Hulk	Shanghai SIPG	17
7	(Spain) Jonathan Soriano	Beijing Sinobo Guoan	16
8	(Brazil) Alexandre Pato	Tianjin Quanjian	15
8	(Brazil) Diego Tardelli	Shandong Luneng Taishan	15
8	(Colombia) Giovanni Moreno	Shanghai Greenland Shenhua	15
8	(Croatia) Nikica Jelavić	Guizhou Hengfeng Zhicheng	15
8	(Nigeria) Odion Ighalo	Changchun Yatai	15

=== Top assists ===
Rank	Player	Club	Assists
1	(Argentina) Ezequiel Lavezzi	Hebei China Fortune	15
2	(Brazil) Hulk	Shanghai SIPG	12
3	(China) Cao Yunding	Shanghai Greenland Shenhua	10
4	(Brazil) Oscar	Shanghai SIPG	9
4	(Brazil) Ricardo Goulart	Guangzhou Evergrande Taobao	9
6	(Brazil) Fernandinho	Chongqing Dangdai Lifan	8
6	(China) Jiang Zhipeng	Guangzhou R&F	8
6	(China) Tang Miao	Guangzhou R&F	8
6	(China) Wu Lei	Shanghai SIPG	8
6	(China) Yu Hanchao	Guangzhou Evergrande Taobao	8

=== Hat-tricks ===
Player	For	Against	Result	Date	Ref
(Brazil) Elkeson	Shanghai SIPG	Changchun Yatai	5–1	4 March 2017	
(Brazil) Ricardo Goulart	Guangzhou Evergrande Taobao	Henan Jianye	4–2	29 April 2017	
(Israel) Eran Zahavi ^{4 goals}	Guangzhou R&F	Yanbian Funde	6–2	23 July 2017	
(The Gambia) Bubacarr Trawally	Yanbian Funde	Beijing Sinobo Guoan	4–4	10 September 2017	
(The Gambia) Bubacarr Trawally	Yanbian Funde	Guangzhou Evergrande Taobao	3–4	13 October 2017	
(Argentina) Ezequiel Lavezzi	Hebei China Fortune	Shandong Luneng Taishan	4–5	4 November 2017	
(Brazil) Diego Tardelli	Shandong Luneng Taishan	Hebei China Fortune	5–4	4 November 2017	

== Awards ==
The awards of the 2017 Chinese Super League were announced on 11 November 2017.

Award	Winner	Club / Team
Player of the Year	(Israel) Eran Zahavi	Guangzhou R&F
Golden Boot	(Israel) Eran Zahavi	Guangzhou R&F
Golden Boot (Domestic Player)	(China) Wu Lei	Shanghai SIPG
Best Goalkeeper	(China) Yan Junling	Shanghai SIPG
Young Player of the Year	(China) Hu Jinghang	Henan Jianye
U-23 Player of the Year	(China) Huang Zhengyu	Guangzhou R&F
Most Popular Player of the Year	(China) Zhang Chengdong	Hebei China Fortune
Manager of the Year	(Italy) Fabio Cannavaro	Tianjin Quanjian
Fair Play Award	Chongqing Dangdai Lifan; Hebei China Fortune; Yanbian Funde	
Best Referee	(China) Ma Ning	
Best Assistant Referee	(China) Huo Weiming	

Team of the Year
Goalkeeper	(China) Yan Junling (Shanghai SIPG)			
Defence	(China) Jiang Zhipeng (Guangzhou R&F)	(China) Feng Xiaoting (Guangzhou Evergrande Taobao)	(China) Huang Zhengyu (Guangzhou R&F)	(China) Wang Shenchao (Shanghai SIPG)
Midfield	(Israel) Eran Zahavi (Guangzhou R&F)	(China) Hao Junmin (Shandong Luneng Taishan)	(China) Wu Lei (Shanghai SIPG)	(Brazil) Ricardo Goulart (Guangzhou Evergrande Taobao)
Attack	(China) Gao Lin (Guangzhou Evergrande Taobao)			(Brazil) Hulk (Shanghai SIPG)

== League attendance ==
As of Round 30

Pos	Team	Total	High	Low	Average	Change
1	Guangzhou Evergrande Taobao	683,841	49,736	35,693	45,589	+1.6%
2	Beijing Sinobo Guoan	520,266	54,018	23,609	34,684	−9.0%
3	Chongqing Lifan	516,582	43,857	26,187	34,439	−4.8%
4	Jiangsu Suning	490,454	49,817	27,973	32,697	−16.1%
5	Shandong Luneng Taishan	454,275	43,658	21,005	30,285	+60.0%
6	Shanghai SIPG	437,614	46,717	25,387	29,174	+4.0%
7	Tianjin Quanjian	373,162	26,021	22,367	24,877	+104.5%^{†}
8	Guizhou Hengfeng Zhicheng	316,525	41,783	0	21,102	+90.3%^{†}
9	Shanghai Greenland Shenhua	285,322	23,998	15,269	19,021	−16.2%
10	Henan Jianye	283,998	21,788	13,169	18,933	+9.6%
11	Yanbian Funde	270,875	27,523	7,110	18,058	−6.5%
12	Hebei China Fortune	270,810	25,223	13,113	18,054	−2.2%
13	Changchun Yatai	247,158	23,617	11,396	16,477	+7.4%
14	Tianjin TEDA	217,964	39,965	10,018	14,531	−33.2%
15	Liaoning Whowin	186,441	21,036	7,015	12,429	−44.8%
16	Guangzhou R&F	148,567	12,823	5,373	9,904	+0.7%
	League total	5,703,854	54,018	0	23,766	−1.6%

Updated to games played on Feb. 28, 2018
Source: , , , , , , , , , , , , , , , , , , , , , , , , , , , , , , ,
