= 2016 Chinese Super League =

Chinese Super League
- Season: 2016
- Dates: 4 March - 30 October 2016
- Champions: Guangzhou Evergrande Taobao (6th title)
- Relegated: Hangzhou Greentown; Shijiazhuang Ever Bright
- AFC Champions League: Guangzhou Evergrande Taobao; Jiangsu Suning; Shanghai SIPG; Shanghai Greenland Shenhua
- Matches: 240
- Goals: 640 (2.67 per match)
- Top goalscorer: (Brazil) Ricardo Goulart (19 goals)
- Best goalkeeper: Zeng Cheng (10 clean sheets)
- Biggest home win: Shanghai SIPG 5–0 Henan Jianye (Jul 10th, 2016) (5 goals)
- Biggest away win: Shijiazhuang Ever Bright 0–6 Guangzhou Evergrande Taobao (Oct 15th, 2016) (6 goals)
- Highest scoring: Chongqing Lifan 4–5 Guangzhou R&F (Aug 21st, 2016) (9 goals)
- Longest winning run: Guangzhou Evergrande Taobao (9 matches)
- Longest unbeaten run: Guangzhou Evergrande Taobao (17 matches)
- Longest winless run: Chongqing Lifan; Hangzhou Greentown (11 matches)
- Longest losing run: Hebei China Fortune (5 matches)
- Highest attendance: 53,080; Beijing Guoan 0–3 Guangzhou Evergrande Taobao (Apr 9th, 2016)
- Lowest attendance: 5,135; Hangzhou Greentown 0–1 Guangzhou R&F (Jun 11th, 2016)
- Average attendance: 24,159
- All statistics correct as of 30 October 2016.

The 2016 Ping An Chinese Football Association Super League (Chinese: 2016中国平安中国足球协会超级联赛) was the 13th season since the establishment of the Chinese Super League. The league title sponsor was Ping An Insurance. Guangzhou Evergrande Taobao won their sixth consecutive title of the league.

The run-up to the season saw clubs spend £200 million on players.

== Club changes ==
Clubs promoted from 2015 China League One

- Yanbian Changbaishan
- Hebei Zhongji

Clubs relegated to 2016 China League One

- Guizhou Renhe
- Shanghai Shenxin

Yanbian Changbaishan and Hebei Zhongji both competed in the Chinese Super League for the first time in their respective histories. Guizhou Renhe were relegated after a 14-year spell in the Chinese top-flight, while Shanghai Shenxin were relegated to China League One after spending 6 seasons in the Chinese Super League.

=== Name changes ===
- Hebei Zhongji changed their name to Hebei China Fortune in December 2015.
- Jiangsu Guoxin-Sainty changed their name to Jiangsu Suning in December 2015.
- Yanbian Changbaishan changed their name to Yanbian Funde in January 2016.

== Clubs ==
=== Clubs and locations ===
Team	Head coach	City	Stadium	Capacity	2015 season
Guangzhou Evergrande Taobao ^{TH}	(Brazil) Luiz Felipe Scolari	Guangzhou	Tianhe Stadium	58,500	1st
Shanghai SIPG	(Sweden) Sven-Göran Eriksson	Shanghai	Shanghai Stadium	56,842	2nd
Shandong Luneng Taishan	(Germany) Felix Magath	Jinan	Jinan Olympic Sports Center Stadium	56,808	3rd
Beijing Guoan	(China) Xie Feng (caretaker)	Beijing	Workers' Stadium	66,161	4th
Henan Jianye	(China) Jia Xiuquan	Zhengzhou	Hanghai Stadium	29,860	5th
Shanghai Greenland Shenhua	(Spain) Gregorio Manzano	Shanghai	Hongkou Football Stadium	33,060	6th
Shijiazhuang Ever Bright	(China) Li Jinyu (caretaker)	Shijiazhuang	Yutong International Sports Center	29,000	7th
Chongqing Lifan	(South Korea) Chang Woe-ryong	Chongqing	Chongqing Olympic Sports Center	58,680	8th
Jiangsu Suning	(South Korea) Choi Yong-soo	Nanjing	Nanjing Olympic Sports Centre	61,443	9th
Changchun Yatai	(South Korea) Lee Jang-soo	Changchun	Development Area Stadium	25,000	10th
Hangzhou Greentown	(South Korea) Hong Myung-bo	Hangzhou	Huanglong Sports Center	52,672	11th
Liaoning Whowin	(China) Ma Lin	Shenyang	Shenyang Olympic Sports Centre Stadium	60,000	12th
Tianjin TEDA	(Portugal) Jaime Pacheco	Tianjin	Tianjin Olympic Centre	54,696	13th
Guangzhou R&F	(Serbia) Dragan Stojković	Guangzhou	Yuexiushan Stadium	18,000	14th
Yanbian Funde ^{P}	(South Korea) Park Tae-ha	Yanji	Yanji Stadium	30,000	CL1, 1st
Hebei China Fortune ^{P}	(Chile) Manuel Pellegrini	Qinhuangdao	Qinhuangdao Olympic Sports Center Stadium	33,572	CL1, 2nd

Location of teams in 2016 Chinese Super League

=== Managerial changes ===
Team	Outgoing manager	Date of vacancy	Incoming manager	Date of appointment
Beijing Guoan	(Spain) Gregorio Manzano	26 November 2015	(Italy) Alberto Zaccheroni	19 January 2016
Shanghai Greenland Shenhua	(France) Francis Gillot	29 November 2015	(Spain) Gregorio Manzano	18 December 2015
Chongqing Lifan	(China) Wang Baoshan	30 November 2015	(South Korea) Chang Woe-ryong	7 December 2015
Shandong Luneng Taishan	(Brazil) Cuca	6 December 2015	(Brazil) Mano Menezes	6 December 2015
Hangzhou Greentown	(China) Yang Ji	17 December 2015	(South Korea) Hong Myung-bo	17 December 2015
Tianjin TEDA	(Netherlands) Arie Haan	18 December 2015	(Serbia) Dragan Okuka	18 December 2015
Changchun Yatai	(Croatia) Marijo Tot	31 December 2015	(Slovenia) Slaviša Stojanovič	13 January 2016
Changchun Yatai	(Slovenia) Slaviša Stojanovič	4 May 2016	(South Korea) Lee Jang-soo	6 May 2016
Beijing Guoan	(Italy) Alberto Zaccheroni	21 May 2016	(China) Xie Feng (caretaker)	21 May 2016
Jiangsu Suning	(Romania) Dan Petrescu	3 June 2016	(China) Tang Jing (caretaker)	3 June 2016
Shandong Luneng Taishan	(Brazil) Mano Menezes	7 June 2016	(Germany) Felix Magath	8 June 2016
Jiangsu Suning	(China) Tang Jing (caretaker)	1 July 2016	(South Korea) Choi Yong-soo	1 July 2016
Shijiazhuang Ever Bright	(Bulgaria) Yasen Petrov	14 July 2016	(China) Li Jinyu (caretaker)	14 July 2016
Tianjin TEDA	(Serbia) Dragan Okuka	2 August 2016	(Portugal) Jaime Pacheco	2 August 2016
Hebei China Fortune	(China) Li Tie	27 August 2016	(Chile) Manuel Pellegrini	27 August 2016

== Foreign players ==
The number of foreign players is restricted to five per CSL team, including a slot for a player from AFC countries, although only four (one AFC countries player at least) can be on the field at any one time.

- Players name in **bold** indicates the players that were registered during the mid-season transfer window.
- Players name in italics indicates the players that were out of squads or left their respective clubs during the mid-season transfer window.

Club	Player 1	Player 2	Player 3	Player 4	AFC player	Former players
Beijing Guoan	(Brazil) Ralf	(Brazil) Renato Augusto	(Turkey) Burak Yılmaz	(Uzbekistan) Egor Krimets	(Uzbekistan) **Igor Sergeev**	(Brazil) Kléber
Changchun Yatai	(Bolivia) Marcelo Moreno	(Brazil) **Bruno Meneghel**	(Croatia) Darko Matić	(Croatia) **Mislav Oršić**	(Uzbekistan) Anzur Ismailov	(France) Julien Gorius (Serbia) Ognjen Ožegović
Chongqing Lifan	(Argentina) Emanuel Gigliotti	(Brazil) **Alan Kardec**	(Brazil) Fernandinho	(Croatia) Goran Milović	(South Korea) Jung Woo-young	(Brazil) Jael
Guangzhou Evergrande Taobao	(Brazil) Alan	(Brazil) Paulinho	(Brazil) Ricardo Goulart	(Colombia) Jackson Martínez	(South Korea) Kim Young-gwon	
Guangzhou R&F	(Australia) Apostolos Giannou	(Brazil) Renatinho	(Israel) **Eran Zahavi**	(Sweden) Gustav Svensson	(South Korea) Jang Hyun-soo	(Brazil) Bruninho
Hangzhou Greentown	(Australia) Matthew Spiranovic	(Brazil) **Anselmo Ramon**	(Brazil) Denílson Gabionetta	(Croatia) **Sammir**	(South Korea) Oh Beom-seok	(Australia) Tim Cahill (Ivory Coast) Davy Claude Angan
Hebei China Fortune	(Brazil) **Aloísio**	(Cameroon) Stéphane Mbia	(France) Gaël Kakuta	(Ivory Coast) Gervinho	(Turkey) Ersan Gülüm ^{1}	(Argentina) Ezequiel Lavezzi
Henan Jianye	(Australia) Ryan McGowan	(Brazil) Ivo	(Slovenia) **Miral Samardžić**	(Sweden) Osman Sow	(Philippines) Javier Patiño	(Denmark) Eddi Gomes
Jiangsu Suning	(Australia) Trent Sainsbury	(Brazil) Alex Teixeira	(Brazil) Ramires	(Colombia) **Roger Martínez**	(South Korea) **Hong Jeong-ho**	(Brazil) Jô (Croatia) Sammir
Liaoning Whowin	(Australia) **Dario Vidošić**	(Democratic Republic of the Congo) Assani Lukimya	(Nigeria) **Anthony Ujah**	(Zambia) James Chamanga	(Australia) Michael Thwaite	(Australia) James Troisi (Senegal) Ibrahima Touré
Shandong Luneng Taishan	(Argentina) Walter Montillo	(Brazil) Gil	(Italy) **Graziano Pellè**	(Senegal) **Papiss Cissé**	(Brazil) Jucilei ^{2}	(Brazil) Aloísio (Brazil) Diego Tardelli
Shanghai Greenland Shenhua	(Colombia) Fredy Guarín	(Colombia) Giovanni Moreno	(Nigeria) Obafemi Martins	(Senegal) Demba Ba	(South Korea) Kim Kee-hee	
Shanghai SIPG	(Argentina) Darío Conca	(Brazil) Elkeson	(Brazil) **Hulk**	(Ivory Coast) Jean Evrard Kouassi	(South Korea) Kim Ju-young	(Ghana) Asamoah Gyan
Shijiazhuang Ever Bright	(Brazil) Diego Maurício	(Brazil) **Matheus**	(France) **Jean-Philippe Mendy**	(Portugal) Rúben Micael	(South Korea) Cho Yong-hyung	(Venezuela) Mario Rondón (Zambia) Jacob Mulenga
Tianjin TEDA	(Colombia) Fredy Montero	(Gabon) **Malick Evouna**	(Mozambique) Zainadine Júnior	(Senegal) Mbaye Diagne	(Australia) Aleksandar Jovanović	(Brazil) Wágner
Yanbian Funde	(The Gambia) Bubacarr Trawally	(Serbia) Nikola Petković	(South Korea) Ha Tae-goon	(South Korea) Kim Seung-dae	(South Korea) Yoon Bit-garam	

Last updated: 16 July 2016.
Source: sports.ifeng.com (in Chinese)

- **^1** Ersan Gülüm has Australian citizenship and was counted as an Asian player in the Chinese Super League
- **^2** Jucilei has Palestine citizenship and was counted as an Asian player in the Chinese Super League

Hong Kong/Macau/Taiwan outfield players (Contracts signed before 1 January 2016 doesn't count on the foreign or Asian player slot in CSL)

Club	Player 1	Player 2
Changchun Yatai	(Chinese Taipei) Yaki Yen	(Hong Kong) Jack Sealy
Hangzhou Greentown	(Chinese Taipei) Chen Po-liang	

== League table ==
Pos	Team	Pld	W	D	L	GF	GA	GD	Pts	Qualification or relegation
1	Guangzhou Evergrande Taobao (C)	30	19	7	4	62	19	+43	64	Qualification to Champions League group stage
2	Jiangsu Suning	30	17	6	7	53	33	+20	57	Qualification to Champions League group stage
3	Shanghai SIPG	30	14	10	6	56	32	+24	52	Qualification to Champions League play-off round
4	Shanghai Greenland Shenhua (Note: Shanghai Greenland Shenhua qualified for the 2017 AFC Champions League qualifying play-offs round as Guangzhou Evergrande Taobao and Jiangsu Suning are 2016 Chinese FA Cup finalists.)	30	12	12	6	46	31	+15	48	Qualification to Champions League play-off round
5	Beijing Guoan	30	11	10	9	34	26	+8	43	
6	Guangzhou R&F	30	11	7	12	47	50	−3	40	
7	Hebei China Fortune	30	11	7	12	34	38	−4	40	
8	Chongqing Lifan	30	9	10	11	43	50	−7	37	
9	Yanbian Funde	30	10	7	13	39	41	−2	37	
10	Tianjin TEDA	30	9	9	12	38	50	−12	36	
11	Liaoning Whowin	30	9	9	12	38	47	−9	36	
12	Changchun Yatai	30	10	5	15	30	44	−14	35	
13	Henan Jianye	30	10	5	15	26	44	−18	35	
14	Shandong Luneng Taishan	30	9	7	14	38	45	−7	34	
15	Hangzhou Greentown (R)	30	8	8	14	28	37	−9	32	Relegation to League One
16	Shijiazhuang Ever Bright (R)	30	7	9	14	28	53	−25	30	Relegation to League One

Source: Sina Sports
Rules for classification: 1) Points; 2) Head-to-head points; 3) Head-to-head goal difference; 4) Head-to-head goals scored; 5) Reserve league points; 6) Goal difference; 7) Goals scored; 8) Disciplinary points (1 point for each yellow card, 3 points for each red card)
(C) Champions; (R) Relegated

== Results ==
Home \ Away	GZE	SSI	SD	BJ	HN	SGS	SJZ	CQ	JSS	CC	HZ	LN	TJ	GZF	YB	HBC
Guangzhou Evergrande Taobao		1–1	4–0	0–0	2–1	2–1	0–0	4–1	2–0	3–0	0–0	6–2	2–0	2–0	1–1	2–0
Shanghai SIPG	0–0		4–1	2–2	5–0	1–1	4–1	5–3	1–2	1–1	1–0	4–0	1–1	1–0	3–0	3–1
Shandong Luneng Taishan	0–2	0–0		0–2	0–0	0–1	4–0	1–1	2–1	1–1	4–1	3–2	2–3	2–3	3–1	1–0
Beijing Guoan	0–3	2–1	1–2		3–1	2–1	0–0	1–2	1–2	2–0	1–0	0–0	0–0	3–1	3–0	0–2
Henan Jianye	1–2	1–0	2–1	1–0		1–1	0–2	0–3	0–1	1–2	1–0	2–1	0–0	1–0	1–0	1–0
Shanghai Greenland Shenhua	2–1	2–1	0–0	0–0	2–2		3–1	2–2	3–2	3–0	4–0	2–1	2–2	5–1	1–1	2–0
Shijiazhuang Ever Bright	0–6	1–2	2–1	1–1	1–0	2–1		1–1	1–6	3–2	1–0	0–1	2–2	3–2	1–3	1–1
Chongqing Lifan	2–1	1–1	2–1	1–1	0–1	0–1	1–0		2–2	1–1	1–0	2–1	1–2	4–5	2–1	1–3
Jiangsu Suning	2–0	2–1	3–0	2–1	4–1	2–0	0–0	2–1		2–0	1–1	4–3	2–0	1–1	2–1	4–0
Changchun Yatai	1–2	1–3	0–0	2–1	1–0	1–0	1–0	3–0	1–2		0–1	0–1	4–4	3–1	1–0	0–1
Hangzhou Greentown	1–2	1–2	2–0	0–3	3–0	0–0	0–0	1–1	3–0	2–1		0–0	3–1	0–1	2–2	1–0
Liaoning Whowin	0–3	3–1	1–1	0–2	1–1	0–0	2–1	3–2	1–0	0–1	2–0		2–2	3–1	3–0	0–2
Tianjin TEDA	0–4	0–1	1–4	0–0	2–1	1–3	2–0	2–3	1–0	4–0	1–0	2–2		0–1	1–0	0–5
Guangzhou R&F	2–1	3–3	1–2	1–1	2–0	1–1	4–2	2–0	1–1	0–1	5–2	1–1	3–2		0–0	1–2
Yanbian Funde	1–1	1–1	2–1	1–0	1–2	2–0	2–0	1–1	3–0	2–0	2–4	4–1	1–2	3–1		3–2
Hebei China Fortune	0–3	0–2	2–1	0–1	4–3	2–2	1–1	1–1	1–1	2–1	0–0	0–0	1–0	0–2	1–0	

Updated to match(es) played on 30 October 2016. Source: Results on the official website of the Chinese Super League (in Chinese)
Legend: Blue = home team win; Yellow = draw; Red = away team win.

== Goalscorers ==
=== Top scorers ===
Rank	Player	Club	Goals
1	(Brazil) Ricardo Goulart	Guangzhou Evergrande Taobao	19
2	(Brazil) Alan	Guangzhou Evergrande Taobao	14
2	(China) Wu Lei	Shanghai SIPG	14
2	(Senegal) Demba Ba	Shanghai Greenland Shenhua	14
2	(Zambia) James Chamanga	Liaoning Whowin	14
6	(Bolivia) Marcelo Moreno	Changchun Yatai	13
7	(Brazil) Alex Teixeira	Jiangsu Suning	11
7	(Brazil) Elkeson	Shanghai SIPG	11
7	(Israel) Eran Zahavi	Guangzhou R&F	11
7	(Turkey) Burak Yılmaz	Beijing Guoan	11

=== Hat-tricks ===
Player	For	Against	Result	Date	Ref
(Bolivia) Marcelo Moreno	Changchun Yatai	Tianjin TEDA	4–4	3 April 2016	
(Senegal) Demba Ba	Shanghai Greenland Shenhua	Shijiazhuang Ever Bright	3–1	3 April 2016	
(Senegal) Demba Ba	Shanghai Greenland Shenhua	Hangzhou Greentown	4–0	19 June 2016	
(China) Wu Lei	Shanghai SIPG	Guangzhou R&F	3–3	31 July 2016	
(Brazil) Alex Teixeira	Jiangsu Suning	Shijiazhuang Ever Bright	6–1	11 September 2016	
(Israel) Eran Zahavi	Guangzhou R&F	Hangzhou Greentown	5–2	16 October 2016	

== League attendance ==
Pos	Team	Total	High	Low	Average	Change
1	Guangzhou Evergrande Taobao	673,243	48,956	30,765	44,883	−2.2%
2	Jiangsu Suning	584,879	48,795	28,923	38,992	+45.2%
3	Beijing Guoan	571,704	53,080	31,801	38,114	−7.0%
4	Chongqing Lifan	542,663	48,855	26,876	36,178	−3.8%
5	Shanghai SIPG	420,603	46,537	20,009	28,040	+6.3%
6	Shanghai Greenland Shenhua	340,353	24,185	19,692	22,690	+16.3%
7	Shijiazhuang Ever Bright	337,839	26,261	17,909	22,523	−10.2%
8	Liaoning Whowin	337,592	48,157	10,279	22,506	+76.0%
9	Tianjin TEDA	326,104	36,820	15,671	22,081	+12.3%
10	Yanbian Funde	289,562	25,280	10,158	19,304	−21.2%^{†}
11	Shandong Luneng Taishan	283,987	31,531	12,655	18,932	−16.1%
12	Hebei China Fortune	277,034	24,631	11,076	18,469	+135.8%^{†}
13	Henan Jianye	259,236	21,377	11,237	17,282	−14.5%
14	Changchun Yatai	230,232	23,629	7,463	15,335	+3.2%
15	Hangzhou Greentown	175,841	22,739	5,135	11,723	−6.7%
16	Guangzhou R&F	147,463	14,596	6,898	9,831	+23.1%
	League total	5,798,135	53,080	5,135	24,159	+8.9%

Updated to games played on Feb. 11th, 2017
Source: , , , , , , , , , , , , , , , , , , , , , , , , , , , , , , ,
Notes:
^{†} Teams played previous season in CL1.

== Awards ==
The awards of 2016 Chinese Super League were announced on 5 November 2016.

- Chinese Football Association Footballer of the Year: (Brazil) Ricardo Goulart (Guangzhou Evergrande Taobao)
- Chinese Super League Golden Boot Winner: (Brazil) Ricardo Goulart (Guangzhou Evergrande Taobao)
- Chinese Super League Domestic Golden Boot Award: (China) Wu Lei (Shanghai SIPG)
- Chinese Football Association Goalkeeper of the Year: (China) Zeng Cheng (Guangzhou Evergrande Taobao)
- Chinese Football Association Young Player of the Year: (China) Li Xiaoming (Henan Jianye)
- Chinese Football Association Manager of the Year: (Brazil) Luiz Felipe Scolari (Guangzhou Evergrande Taobao)
- Chinese Football Association Referee of the Year: (China) Ma Ning
- Chinese Super League Fair Play Award: Shandong Luneng Taishan, Tianjin TEDA
- Chinese Super League Team of the Year (442):
  - GK (China) Zeng Cheng (Guangzhou Evergrande Taobao)
  - DF (China) Zhang Linpeng (Guangzhou Evergrande Taobao), (South Korea) Kim Young-gwon (Guangzhou Evergrande Taobao), (China) Feng Xiaoting (Guangzhou Evergrande Taobao), (China) Jiang Zhipeng (Guangzhou R&F)
  - MF (Brazil) Ricardo Goulart (Guangzhou Evergrande Taobao), (Brazil) Paulinho (Guangzhou Evergrande Taobao), (China) Wu Xi (Jiangsu Suning), (China) Wu Lei (Shanghai SIPG)
  - FW (China) Gao Lin (Guangzhou Evergrande Taobao), (Senegal) Demba Ba (Shanghai Greenland Shenhua)
