= Shenzhen Special Economic Zone =

Designated area in Guangdong, China

Shenzhen Special Economic Zone 深圳经济特区
- Special Economic Zone
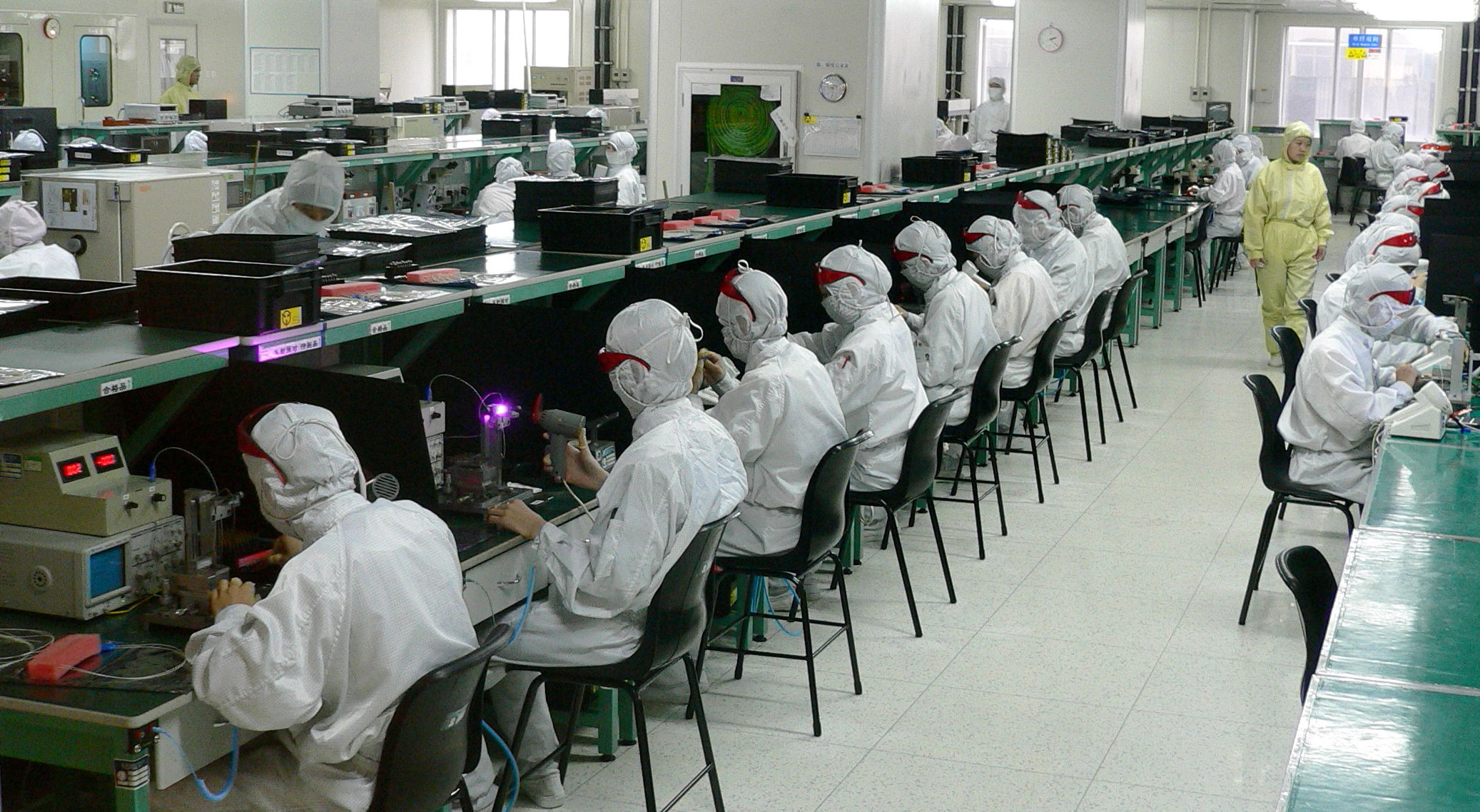
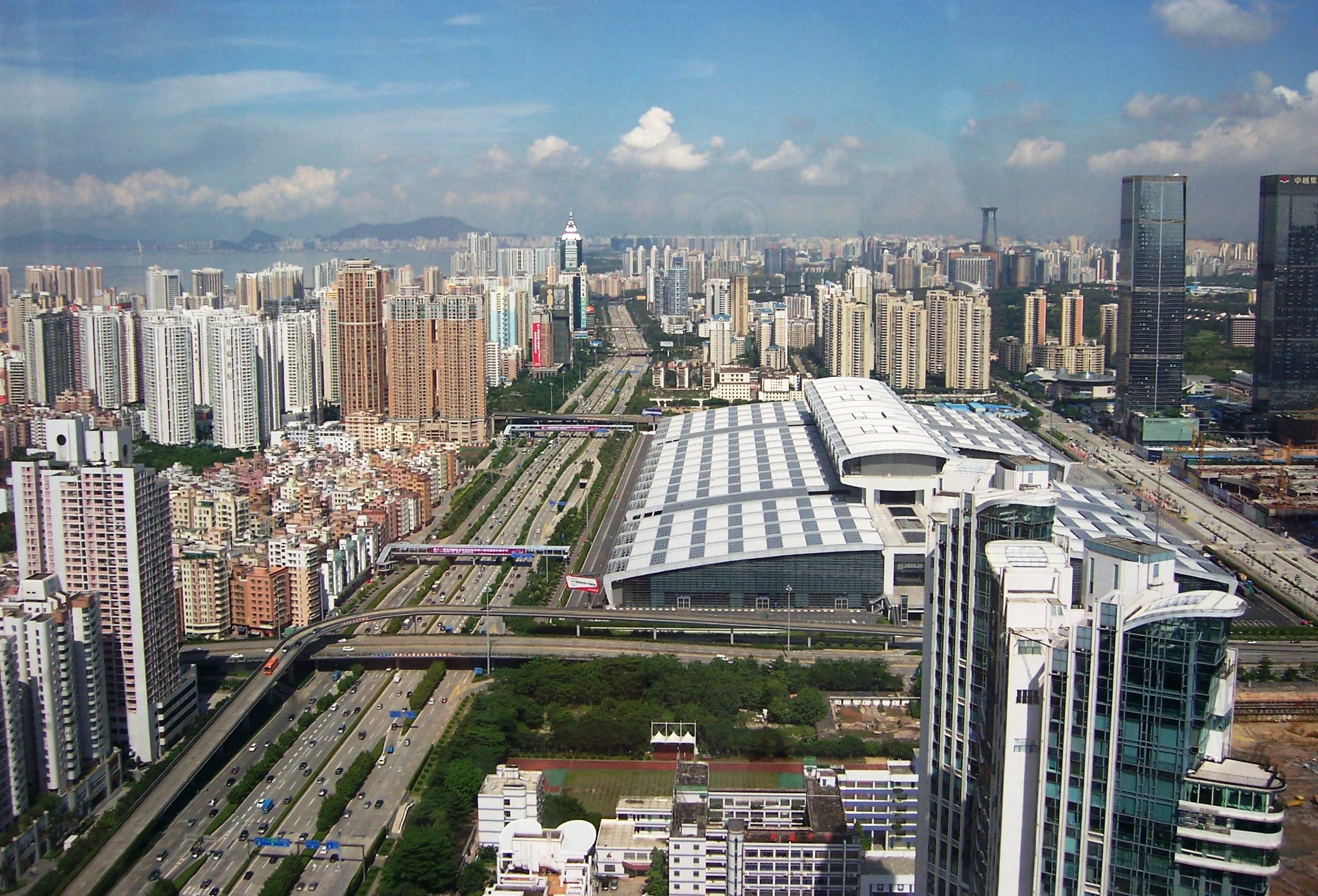
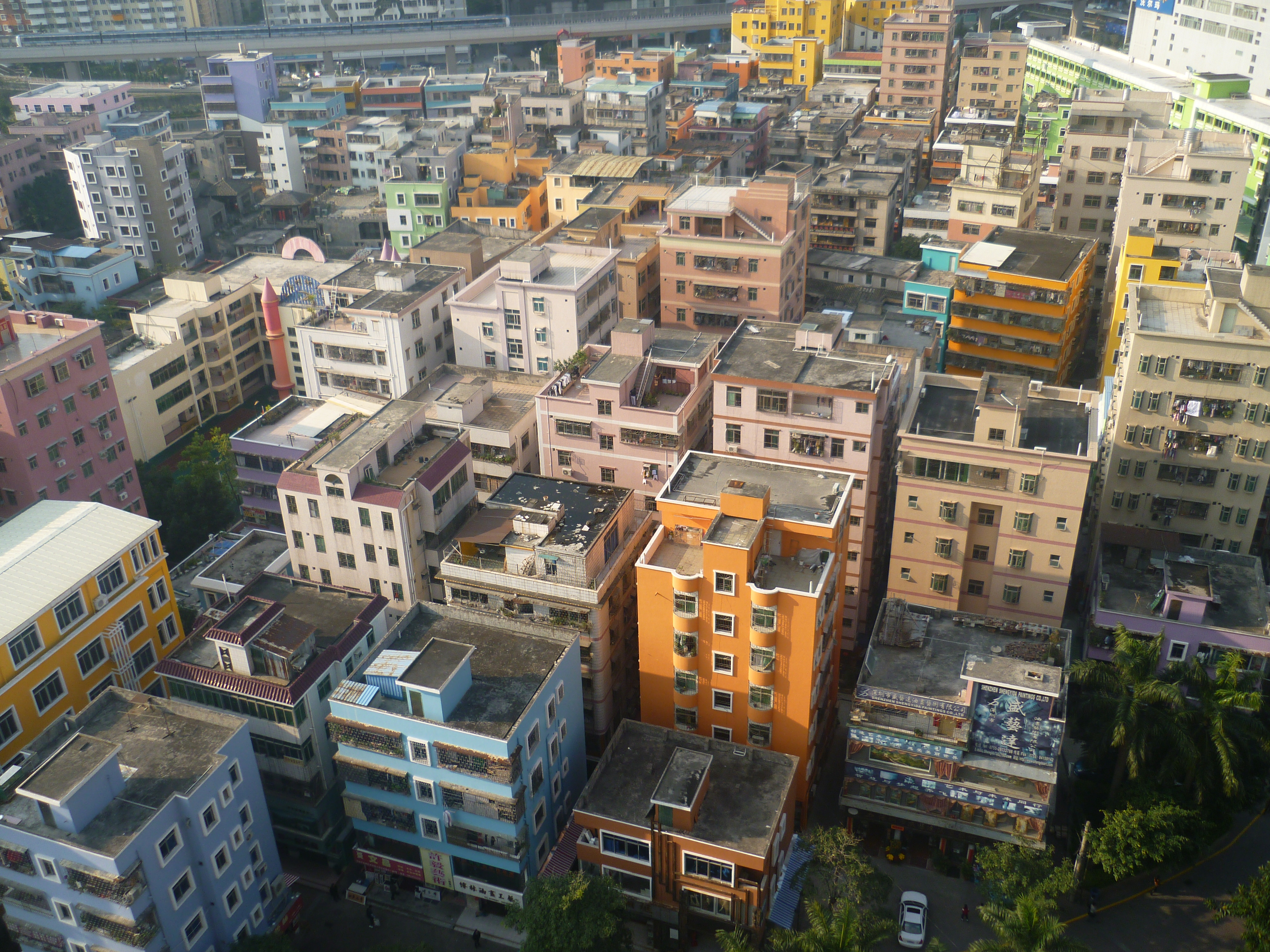
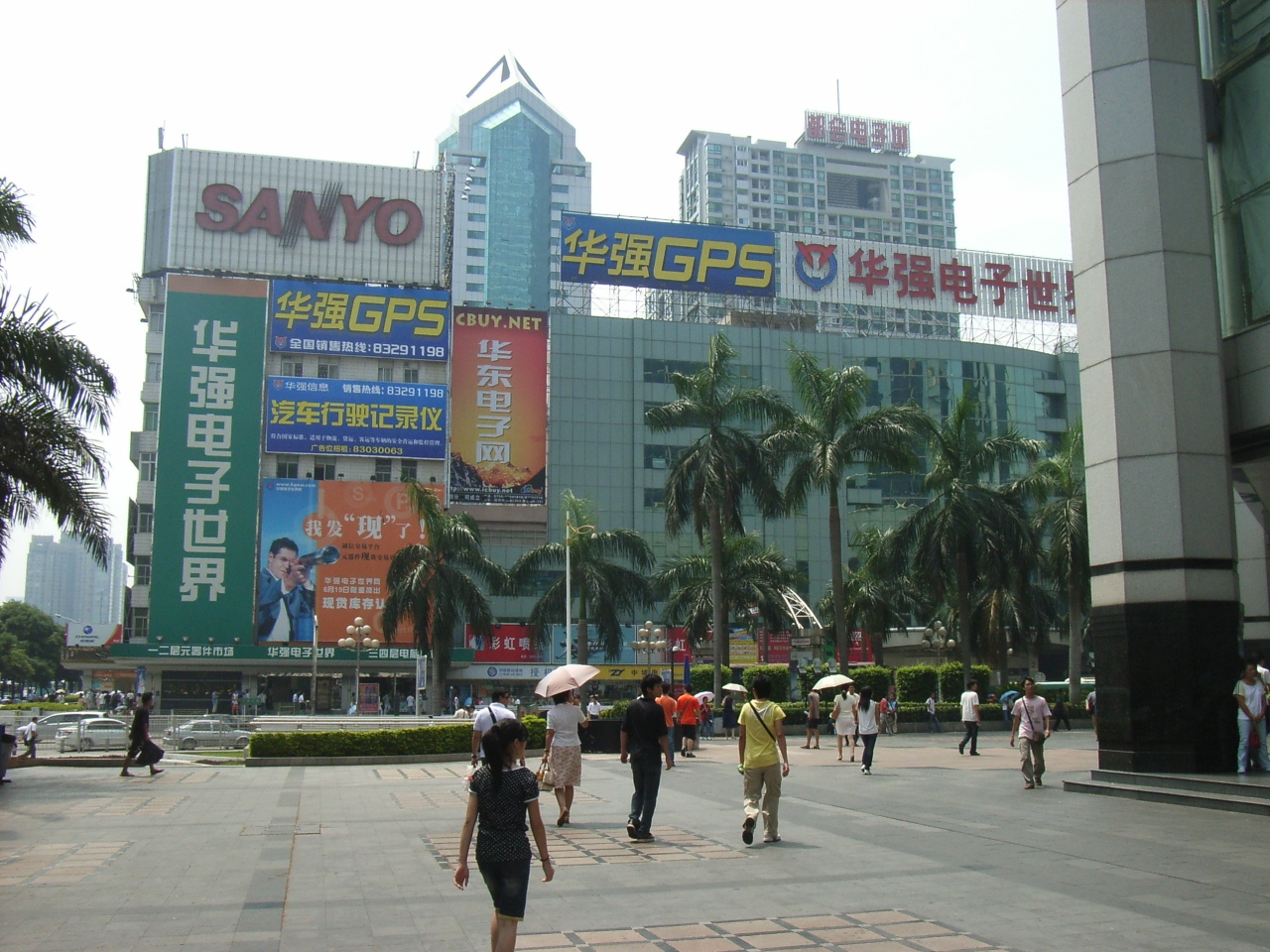
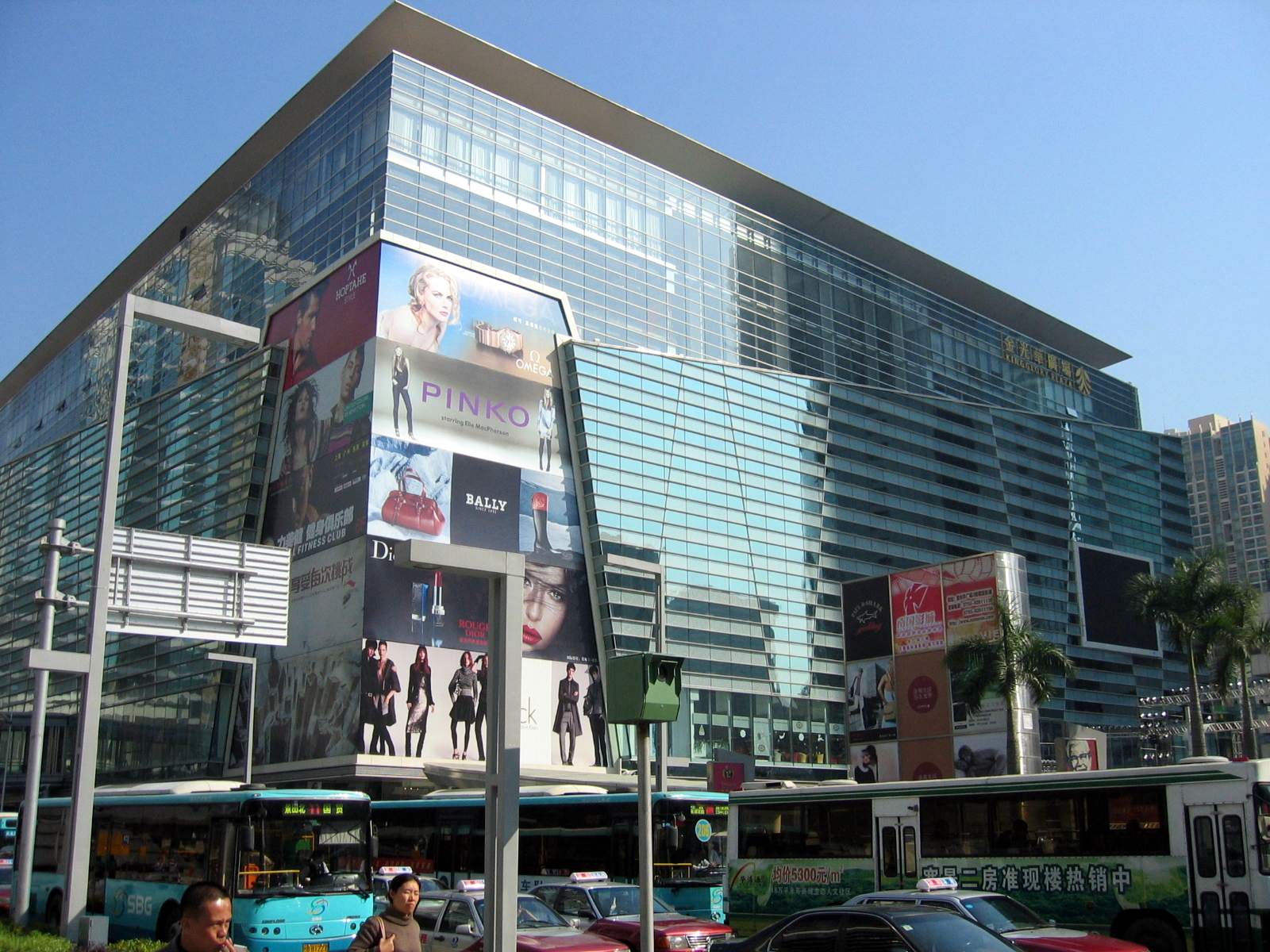
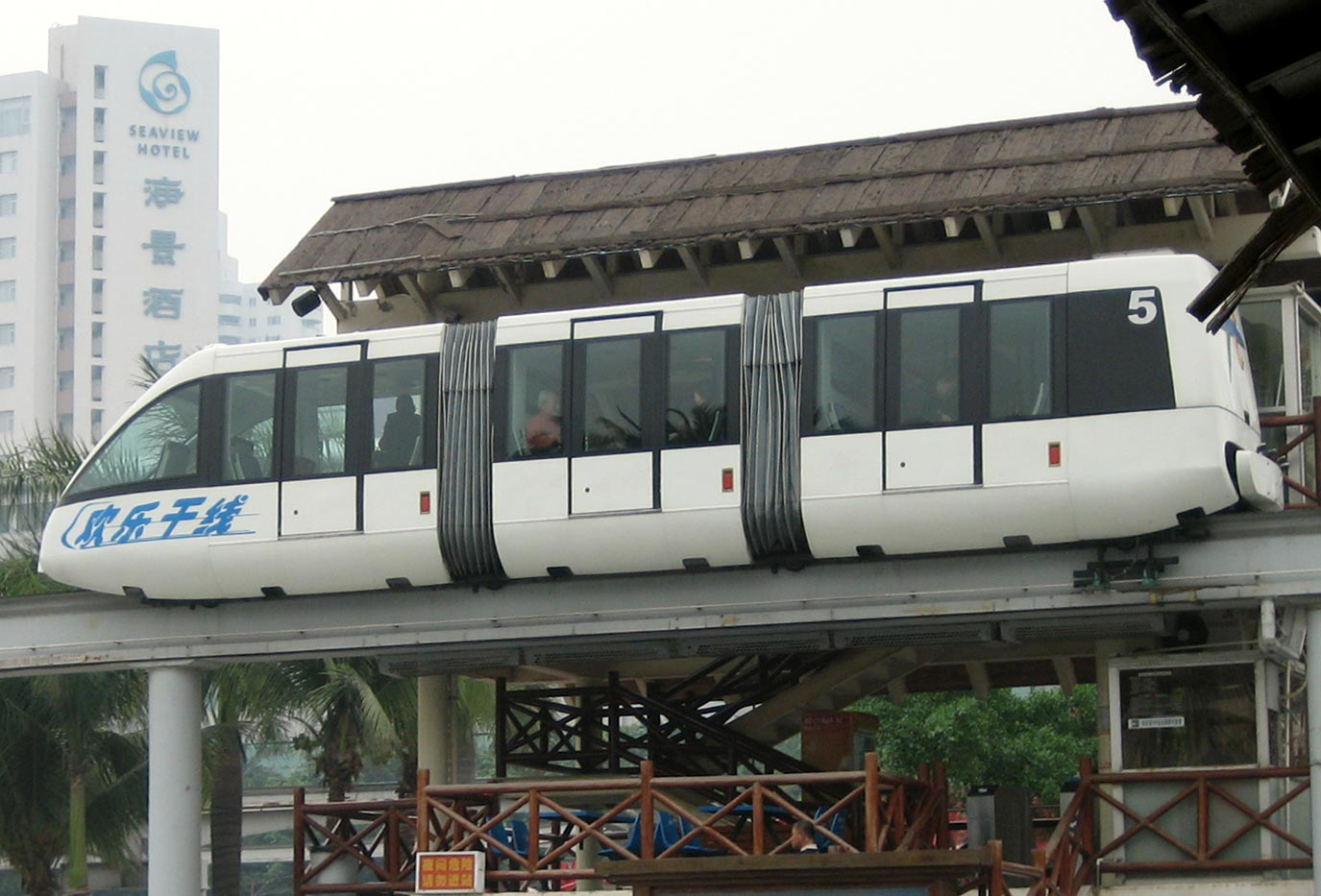

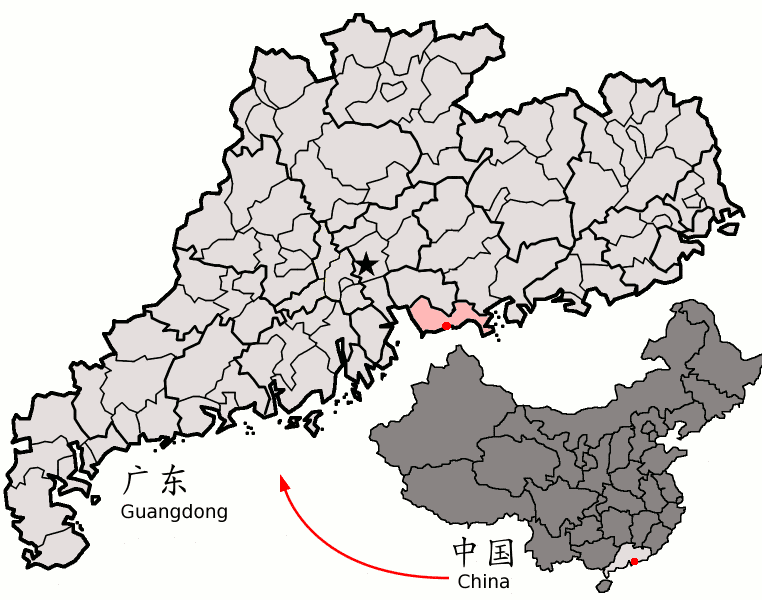
- The geographical location of Shenzhen Special Economic Zone in China
- Coordinates: 22°32′N 114°05′E
- Country: China
- City: Shenzhen
- Establishment: 26 August 1980

Government
  - Body: Shenzhen Municipal People's Government
- Time zone: UTC+8 (China Standard Time)
- Postal code: 518000
- Area code: 755
- Website: http://www.sz.gov.cn/

Shenzhen Special Economic Zone
- Simplified Chinese: 深圳经济特区
- Traditional Chinese: 深圳經濟特區
Transcriptions
Standard Mandarin
- Hanyu Pinyin: Shēnzhèn Jīngjìtèqū
Yue: Cantonese
- Jyutping: sam1 zan3 ging1 zai3 dak6 keoi1

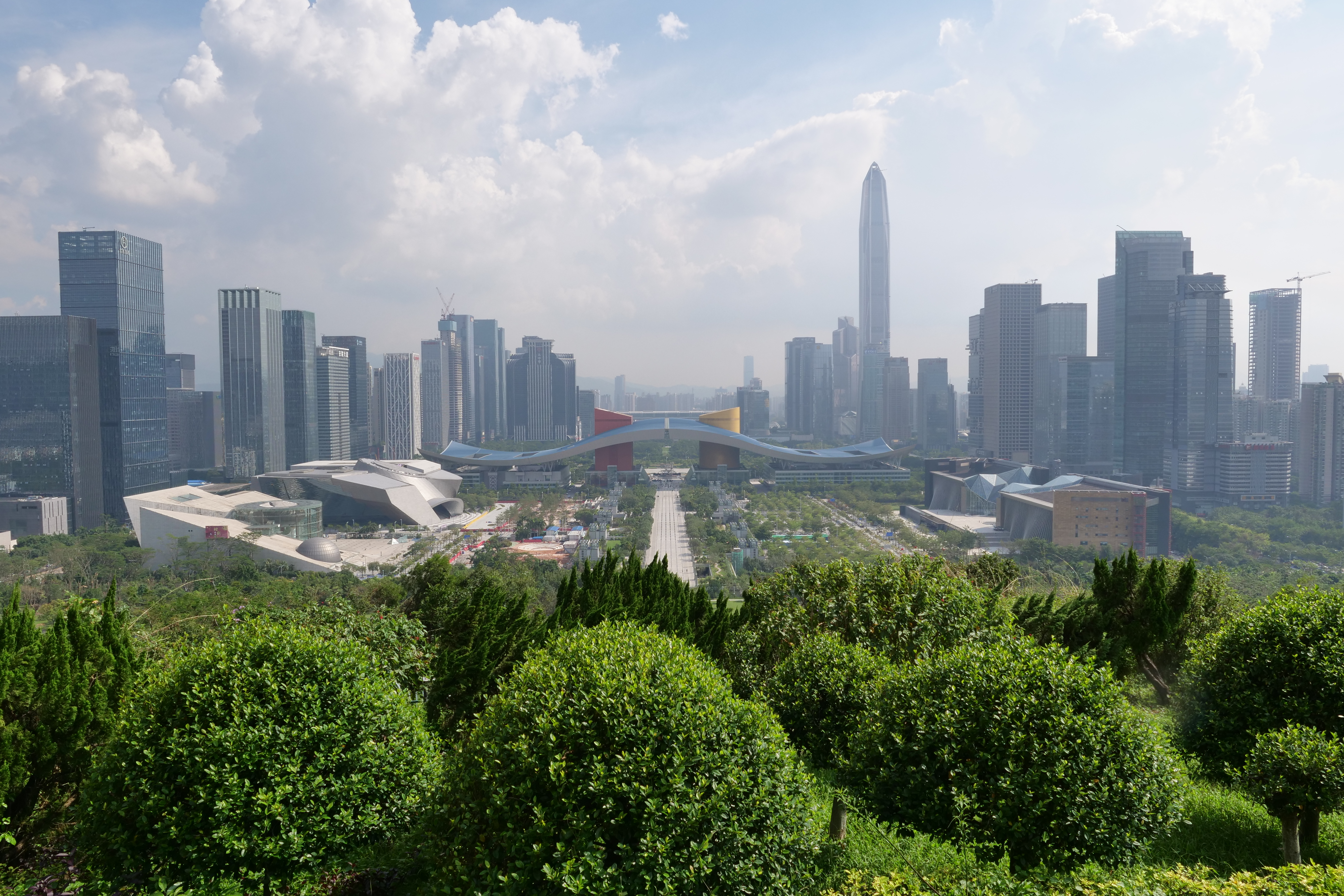
City center in Shenzhen

The Shenzhen Special Economic Zone (Chinese: 深圳经济特区) is a special economic zone (SEZ) of China. One of four special economic zones (SEZ) established in May 1980, it was the first SEZ created by Deng Xiaoping, and, like the other three zones, was modeled after Ireland's Shannon Free Zone.

Until 2010, the Shenzhen Special Economic Zone comprised four of the nine districts of Shenzhen City in Guangdong Province, namely Luohu, Futian, Nanshan, and Yantian, with a total area of 493 km^{2}. In 2010, it was expanded to include the rest of the city, substantially increasing the geographical size of the SEZ.

== History ==
Initially, the Shenzhen Special Economic Zone applied to part of Shenzhen as opposed to the entire municipality.

The celebration of the 40th Anniversary of the Shenzhen Special Economic Zone was held on 14 October 2020.

Shenzhen's exponential growth in development since the 1980s was largely driven by heavy foreign investment, primarily from Hong Kong and Singapore. Investors were offered tax-based incentives through their real estate deals, lower labor costs, and easy trade regulations in return for foreign funds. All of these factors encouraged not just financial gain, but entire companies to look into expanding into China and investing in Shenzhen. This is demonstrated by the relocation of various export-oriented manufacturing firms to Shenzhen. This history of offering a safe and reliable method of investing for clients is what allowed Shenzhen to become one of China's fastest-growing industrial centers.

Throughout the late 1990's to the early 2000's, Shenzhen began to transition from labor-intensive industries toward technology and innovation-driven industries. Similar, to how early San Francisco transitioned into one of the largest and most renowned innovation capitals of the world. Shenzhen did not have an Uber or an Apple, but paved the way for successes of tech giants like Huawei and Tencent. Government Investment and allocation of money has continually gone towards research, innovation incentives, and electronics manufacturing, allowing Shenzhen to rise in the rankings of not just one of the top leading centers for tech development and entrepreneurship in China but also in the World.

== Population characteristics ==
Before Shenzhen became a special economic zone in 1980, it existed as a small city containing only 310,000 residents and less than 30,000 workers. By the end of 2000, however, the population had grown to 4.33 million and its labor force to 3.09 million. By 2007, the official population count reached 8.6 million, of which only 2.1 million people were permanent residents, but it is difficult to estimate the exact population because of millions of unaccounted migrant workers, and the true population could have reached 12-14 million.

Less than 30 percent of the population are permanent residents. These are mainly state officials, entrepreneurs, technicians and skilled workers who have traveled from major cities. The other 70 percent are temporary residents, mainly migrant laborers from rural areas who lack official household registration and citizenship. The majority of migrants in Shenzhen are female. Pun Ngai, president of the Chinese Women Working Network and sociology professor at the Hong Kong University of Science and Technology, suggests that the rapid economic development of Shenzhen and the advancement of its position in the global economy are dependent on extracting female workers from the rural areas, and considers this process to be a precarious employment system in which women face inhumane working conditions and receive low wages for extensive hours.

== Legislation ==
SEZs were authorized to develop their own legislation. The Shenzhen Special Economic Zone was the most active SEZ for legislative experiments from 1979 to 1990 and its legislation had a significant role in shaping national economic law on foreign trade and investment during that period.

== Advantages and disadvantages of migrant work ==
While Pun and others are critical of the system that has been implemented, empirical studies suggest that migration may promote women's autonomy — specifically when considering unmarried women migrants. Although these women may face challenges and discrimination at times, they often gain freedom from traditional expectations of women's familial and social roles, primarily by being separated from older family members and because of the influence of urban culture.

Ultimately, migration can allow young women to feel more confident and self-aware whilst providing the opportunity to increase their own social status through the acquisition of savings and personal property. It also means that they can marry later than non-migrants, thereby avoiding marrying into agricultural families that support patriarchal traditions. In contrast, married female migrants are expected to continue living under restrictive gender roles.

While urban life may offer poorer schooling, many mothers still advocate this lifestyle because of the benefits that their daughters may receive, such as gaining essential skills to be successful in city life, and increasing quality of life through the development of self-identity. While these daughters have the potential to develop these highly desired skills, they must also face a variety of environmental factors and working conditions associated with this lifestyle.

== The environment ==
Although some question the means by which Shenzhen achieved economic advancement, others see the economic rise as an unprecedented "growth miracle" in human history. According to the World Bank, China has become one of the most important members of the global economy and a leader in international trade and investment, and its growth has brought more than 400 million people out of poverty. In 1997, Shenzhen was declared the national model city for environmental protection, and in 2002 received the United Nations Environment Programme (UNEP) award of Global 500 Roll of Honor based on the city's efforts to yield gains concerning both the economy and the environment.

From this perspective, it appears that Shenzhen has been able to develop its economy successfully while preventing environmental damage. However, extensive environmental degradation has also taken place in Shenzhen; the rapid urbanization process has taken a large toll on water quality. Shenzhen also suffers from serious air pollution due to industrial emissions, high levels of automobile traffic and construction work. Since the development of Shenzhen has greatly influenced other economic zones within China, it is feared that similar effects may result in these other locations as well. While the implementation of environmental policies may reduce the severity of these consequences, it is predicted that mending the damage that has already happened will take substantial time and effort. All members of society must face the environmental degradation that has occurred; however, it is the migrant workers who face the harshest impact because they live in crowded and heavily restricted factory dormitories.

== See also ==
- Shantou Special Economic Zone
- Xiamen Special Economic Zone
- Zhuhai Special Economic Zone
- Kashgar Special Economic Zone
- Xiong'an
