= 30th Anniversary of Development and Opening Up of Pudong =

2020 Chinese historical anniversary

Celebration of the 30th Anniversary of Pudong's Development and Opening-up
- Native name: 浦东开发开放30周年庆祝大会
- Date: 12 November 2020
- Location: Shenzhen, Guangdong, China
- Motive: Commemoration of the 30th Anniversary of Pudong's Development and Opening-up Policy
- Organised by: Chinese Communist Party; • Xi Jinping (General Secretary); • Li Qiang (Party Secretary of Shanghai and host)
- Participants: Chinese Communist Party, Government of China

The 30th Anniversary Celebration of Pudong Development and Opening-up were held on 20 November 2020 to celebrate the 30th anniversary of the development and opening up of Pudong held by the People's Republic of China. In 1990, the Central Committee of the Chinese Communist Party and the State Council of the People's Republic of China announced this decision. After that, the GDP of Pudong increased by more than 60 times in the next 20 years, becoming one of the most important symbols of China's reform and opening up period.

== Background ==
In April 1986, the Shanghai Municipal People's Government proposed a preliminary plan for the development of Pudong and submitted the "Outline of the Shanghai Urban Planning Plan Report" to the central government. In October 1986, the State Council clearly pointed out in its reply to the "Shanghai Urban Master Plan": "At present, special attention should be paid to the planned construction and transformation of the Pudong area. We should build the Huangpu River Bridge and tunnel as soon as possible, develop financial, trade, science and technology, higher education and commercial service facilities in Pudong, build new residential areas, and make Pudong New Area a modern new area." In June 1987, the Shanghai Municipal People's Government formally established the "Pudong New Area Sino-Foreign Joint Advisory Group", which formed a one-year feasibility study. In May 1989, Deng Xiaoping stated that the reform and opening-up policy would remain unchanged. In February 1990, Zou Jiahua, director of the State Planning Commission, rushed to Shanghai to inspect Pudong. Subsequently, the Shanghai Municipal Committee of the Chinese Communist Party and the Shanghai Municipal People's Government submitted the "Request for the Development and Opening of Pudong" to the Central Committee of the Chinese Communist Party and the State Council.

On March 3, 1990, Deng Xiaoping met with Jiang Zemin, General Secretary of the CCP Central Committee, and Li Peng, Premier of the State Council, and pointed out the problem of the slowdown in economic development that year. Finally, he proposed that "Shanghai is our trump card, and developing Shanghai is a shortcut." From March 28 to April 8, Zou Jiahua and Yao Yilin, member of the Standing Committee of the Politburo of the CCP Central Committee, led a delegation to Shanghai to conduct a ten-day investigation on the development of Pudong. On April 10, they submitted the final summary plan to the State Council meeting. On April 12, Jiang Zemin, General Secretary of the CCP Central Committee, presided over the meeting of the Politburo of the CCP Central Committee and approved in principle the Pudong development plan submitted by the State Council. On April 18, Premier Li Peng, on behalf of the central government, officially announced the development policy of the Pudong area at the fifth anniversary meeting of the establishment of Shanghai Volkswagen Co., Ltd. On June 2, the CCP Central Committee and the State Council issued the "Reply on the Development and Opening of Pudong". In September, the State Council approved the establishment of the Shanghai Pudong Waigaoqiao Free Trade Zone. In early 1991, Deng Xiaoping spent the Spring Festival in Shanghai and talked with Zhu Rongji, then Party Secretary of Shanghai. He proposed that "the development of Pudong...is related to the development of Shanghai and the use of Shanghai as a base to develop the Yangtze River Delta and the Yangtze River Basin."

In 2005, the national comprehensive reform strategy was implemented and Pudong became the first comprehensive reform pilot zone. In 2009, Pudong merged with Nanhui, and the new Pudong set a goal of becoming a core area of an international financial center and shipping center by 2020. In 2013, the Shanghai Free Trade Zone was established in Pudong. In 2019, the Lingang New Area of the China (Shanghai) Pilot Free Trade Zone was officially unveiled.

== Events ==
On the morning of November 12, 2020, a celebration meeting for the 30th anniversary of the development and opening up of Pudong was held at the Shanghai World Expo Center. Xi Jinping, General Secretary of the CCP Central Committee, President of the People ’s Republic of China, and Chairman of the Central Military Commission, attended the meeting and delivered a speech. The meeting was chaired by Li Qiang, member of the Politburo of the CCP Central Committee and Secretary of the Shanghai Municipal Committee. Ding Xuexiang, Liu He, Chen Xi, and He Lifeng attended the meeting. Subsequently, Weng Zuliang, Secretary of the Pudong New Area Party Committee, Liu Hong, Chairman of Shanghai Waigaoqiao Group Co., Ltd., and Chen Kaixian, former Director of the Shanghai Institute of Materia Medica, Chinese Academy of Sciences, spoke at the meeting. On the same morning, Xi Jinping and others also visited the “Theme Exhibition of the 30th Anniversary of the Development and Opening Up of Pudong, under the Guidance of National Strategy”.

At the same time, on November 11, Premier Li Keqiang chaired an executive meeting of the State Council and decided to launch a pilot program of "one license for one industry" for market access in Pudong New Area, further deepening the reform of the Shanghai Pilot Free Trade Zone. It aims to establish a comprehensive licensing system for 31 industries such as e-commerce, construction engineering, convenience stores, small restaurants, gyms, bookstores, and cinemas for small and micro enterprises and individual businesses, integrating multiple licenses required by enterprises into one comprehensive industry license. The 25 licensing matters that were previously implemented by the State Council departments were changed to be entrusted to Pudong New Area to accept and issue licenses, so that market entities can "operate with one license".

On the evening of November 12, a gala to celebrate the 30th anniversary of Pudong's development and opening up was held at the Shanghai Grand Theater. Shanghai Municipal Party Committee Secretary Li Qiang, Shanghai Municipal Party Committee Deputy Secretary and Mayor Gong Zheng, Shanghai Municipal People's Congress Standing Committee Chairman Jiang Zhuoqing, Shanghai Municipal Committee of the Chinese People's Political Consultative Conference Chairman Dong Yunhu, Shanghai Municipal Party Committee Deputy Secretary Yu Shaoliang and others watched the performance.
