= OneConnect Financial Technology =

Financial platform

OneConnect Financial Technology Co. Pte. Ltd.
- Company type: Public
- Traded as: NYSE: OCFT
- Industry: Financial services financial technology
- Founded: 2015; 11 years ago
- Headquarters: Shenzhen, China
- Key people: Ye Wangchun, CEO; Lo Wei Jye Jacky, CFO
- Services: Software; Banking; Data management; AI; Fintech
- Parent: Ping An Group
- Website: http://www.ocft.com

OneConnect Financial Technology Co., Ltd. (OneConnect; Chinese: 金融壹账通; pinyin: Jinróng yīzhàngtōng) (Note: Ping A cloud service helped China's small banks go digital) is a technology-as-a-service platform for financial institutions. The company was listed on the New York Stock Exchange in 2019 (NYSE: OCFT). OneConnect is an associate of Ping An Group. (Note: OneConnect financing platform completed five rounds of testing)

As of June 30, 2020, OneConnect had served all of China's major banks, 99% of its city commercial banks, and 53% of its insurance companies. In the same year, it was added to the FTSE Global Equity Index Series.

In September 2018, the ALFA intelligent ABS platform was launched. In November 2023, Lufax acquired Ping An OneConnect Bank (Hong Kong) from OneConnect Financial for HK$933 million.
