= Lufax =

Online Internet finance marketplace

Shanghai Lujiazui International Financial Asset Exchange Co., Ltd.
- Company type: Public
- Traded as: NYSE: LU
- Industry: Personal finance, Software
- Founded: 2011
- Headquarters: Shanghai; China
- Products: Financial services Peer-to-peer lending
- Website: lu.com

Lufax (Chinese: 陆金所; pinyin: Lùjīnsuǒ), full name Shanghai Lujiazui International Financial Asset Exchange Co., Ltd., is an online Internet finance marketplace headquartered in Lujiazui, Shanghai. Founded in 2011, it is an associate of China Ping An Group.

The company was founded in September 2011, and started with P2P lending as the only service. It is the second largest peer-to-peer lender in China. Now the company is said to be branching out their business gradually, becoming a much broader platform that work together with funds, insurance companies and financial license holders. The platform makes money by matching borrowers with investors, collecting a 4% fee on each loan. Since the start of the business, the company has arranged more than 200,000 peer-to-peer loans that worth a total of $2.5 billion.

By 2015, Ping An Insurance (Group) Co. owns 43% of the company. On the surface Lufax is a part of Ping An Group, and maintains a good relationship with the Chinese government.
