= Development and opening up of Pudong =

1990 Chinese government policy

The development and opening up of Pudong was a decision announced by the Central Committee of the Chinese Communist Party and the State Council of the People's Republic of China in April 1990, which led to the birth of the Pudong New Area in Shanghai. The GDP of Pudong increased by more than 60 times in the following 20 years, becoming one of the most important symbols of China's reform and opening up.

== Background ==
=== Shanghai’s economic woes ===
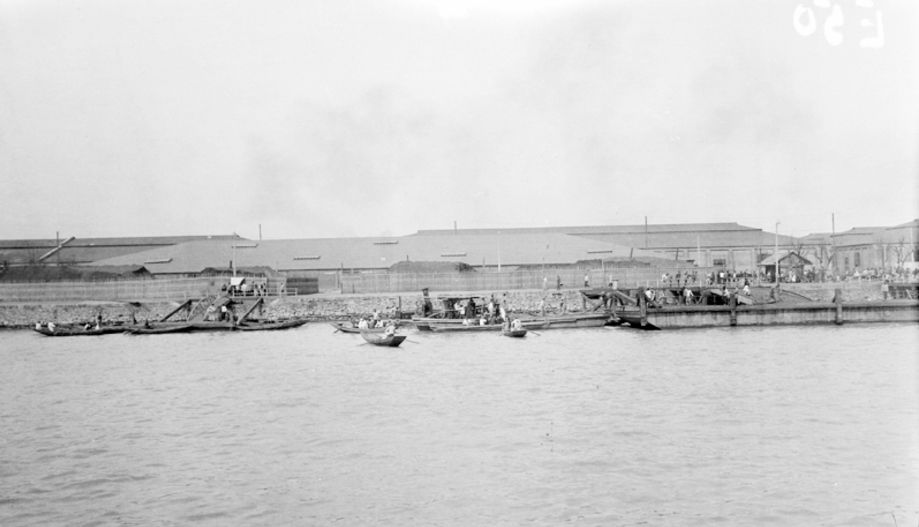
In the 1920s, Pudong had only low-rise buildings, while Puxi was already quite prosperous.

There has long been a huge gap in economic development between the two sides of the Huangpu River. Pudong means "east of the Huangpu River", but before 1990, Pudong was not a term on the map, but a general term for the former Chuansha County, Nanhui County, the eastern part of the former Fengxian County, and a small number of areas on the east bank of the Huangpu River in other districts and counties. As the Huangpu River blocked traffic between the two sides, Pudong could only rely on ferries to travel with Puxi for a long time, and its development was very slow. In 1292, Shanghai County was established, and the county seat was located in Puxi. In 1843, Shanghai was opened as a port, and various countries successively established concessions, all located in Puxi. In 1990, Pudong's economy accounted for 8% of Shanghai's economy, while the Lujiazui area was basically a shantytown composed of simple housing. There is a widely circulated saying among Shanghai citizens: I would rather have a bed in Puxi than a room in Pudong, which shows the huge gap between the two sides.

At the same time, Shanghai as a whole is also facing economic difficulties. Shanghai has long been China's largest industrial base. Before the reform and opening up, its total industrial output value accounted for about 30% of the country's total industrial output value. However, since the 1980s, Shanghai's position as the economic center of mainland China has been constantly challenged by the emerging special economic zones in the south. Its economic development has been slow, and its share of regional GDP in the country has dropped from 7.48% in 1978 to 4.19% in 1990.

=== Significance for China ===
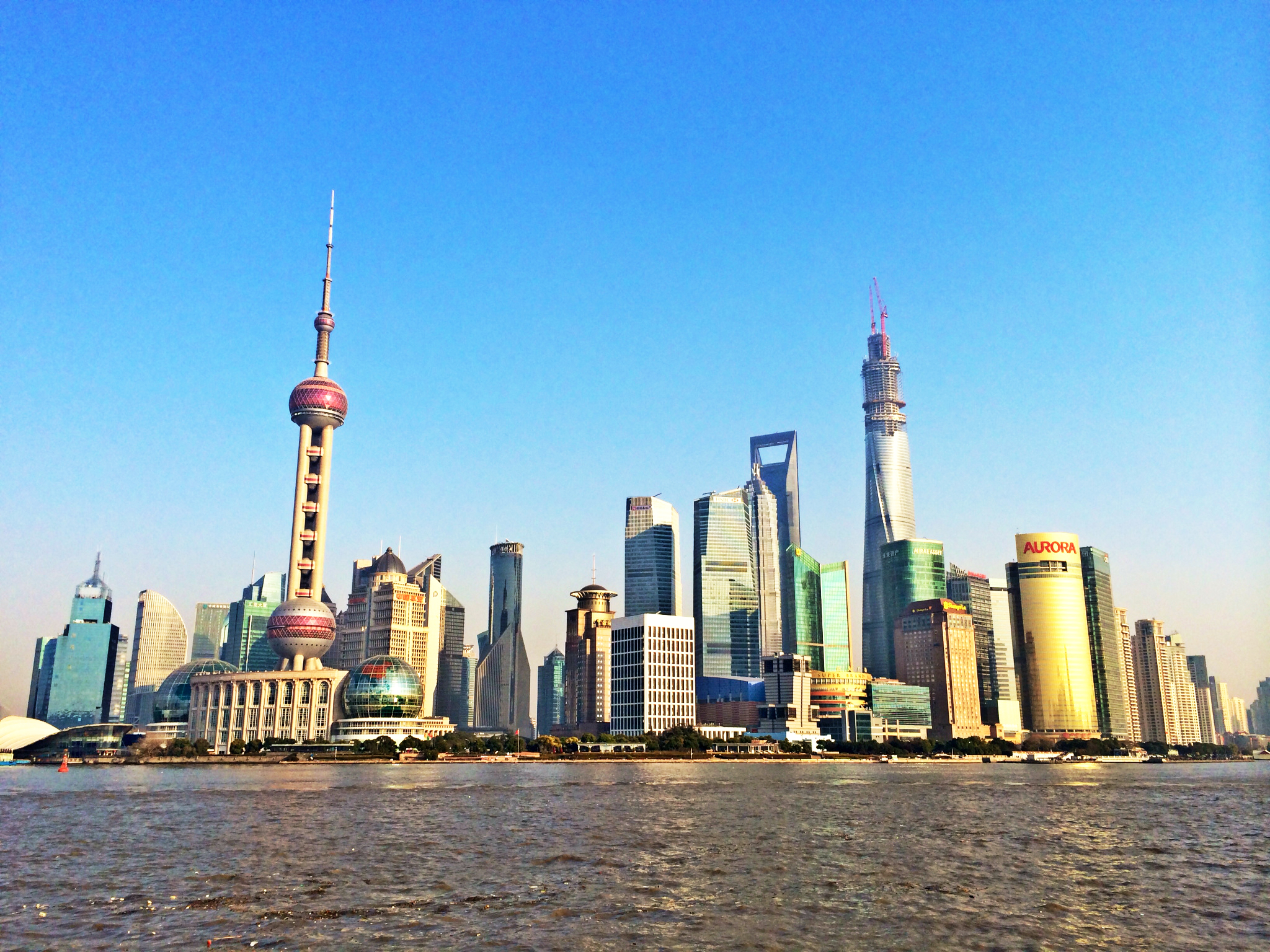
The buildings in Lujiazui Financial and Trade Zone are a symbol of Pudong's development and opening up.

Deng Xiaoping played a crucial role in the decision to open up Pudong, Shanghai. In 1990, Deng Xiaoping said: "Shanghai is our trump card. Developing Shanghai is a shortcut." However, since Shanghai's economy accounts for a very important proportion of the country's economy, if the development of a special zone or new area in Shanghai fails, it will have a major impact on China's economy. Therefore, Deng Xiaoping did not officially decide to develop Pudong until the special zone policy in Shenzhen achieved remarkable results. Deng Xiaoping said: "The development of Pudong will have a great impact. It is not just a problem of Pudong, but a problem related to the development of Shanghai. It is a problem of using Shanghai as a base to develop the Yangtze River Delta and the Yangtze River Basin." He believed that the development of Pudong would not only help the development of Shanghai, but also further promote the development of the Yangtze River Delta and the Yangtze River Basin, and even have an important impact on the situation of reform and opening up in the country.

=== Political factors ===
After the 1989 Tiananmen Square protests and massacre, many countries questioned whether China would continue to implement reform and opening up. Deng Xiaoping said, "Now the international community is worried that we will withdraw. We must do a few things to show that our reform and opening up policy remains unchanged and that we will further reform and open up. Deng Xiaoping proposed that the leaders of Shanghai could take some actions to show China's determination to continue to implement the reform and opening up policy. Deng Xiaoping agreed with the Shanghai Municipal Government's idea of developing Pudong and personally changed "developing Pudong" to "developing and opening up Pudong".

== Preliminary preparation ==
Pudong New Area after 2009

In the mid-1980s, Shanghai began to investigate the development of Pudong. In 1984, the State Council's Shanghai Reconstruction and Revitalization Research Group and the Shanghai Municipal People's Government jointly formulated the "Report Outline on Shanghai's Economic Development Strategy", which first raised the issue of developing Pudong. Afterwards, the Shanghai Municipal People's Government submitted the "Report Outline on Shanghai's Economic Development Strategy" to the Central Committee of the Chinese Communist Party and the State Council, and it was approved on February 8, 1985. The State Council required "to strive to build Shanghai into an open, multi-functional, rationally structured, scientifically advanced, and highly civilized socialist modern city by the end of this century." This marked that the idea of developing Pudong was recognized by the central government. In the "Shanghai Urban Master Plan" formulated by the Shanghai Municipal Government in 1985, the content of Pudong development was already included.

In July 1987, a joint advisory group for the development of Pudong, composed of experts from various countries, began to study the Pudong development topic. In August, the Pudong New Area Planning Outline (draft) and the preliminary plan were compiled by the Shanghai Municipal Planning Bureau. In May 1988, Shanghai held an international seminar on the development of Pudong New Area. Jiang Zemin, then secretary of the Shanghai Municipal Committee of the Chinese Communist Party, Zhu Rongji, mayor, and more than 140 experts and scholars from various countries attended the meeting. In November, the Shanghai Municipal Government established a leading group for the development of Pudong New Area.

In February 1989, the Shanghai Municipal Party Committee and the Shanghai Municipal Government submitted a “Report on the Development of Pudong” to the CCP Central Committee. Vice Premier Yao Yilin then led the heads of the State Council Special Zone Office, the State Planning Commission, the Ministry of Finance, the People's Bank of China, the Ministry of Economic and Trade, the Ministry of Commerce, and the Bank of China to Shanghai for research and demonstration, and submitted a “Report Outline on Several Issues Concerning the Development of Shanghai Pudong” to the Central Committee and the State Council, which was approved.

== Main events ==
On April 18, 1990, Li Peng, then Premier of the State Council, announced at the celebration meeting for the fifth anniversary of the establishment of Shanghai Volkswagen Automotive Co., Ltd. that the Party Central Committee and the State Council agreed that Shanghai should accelerate the development of Pudong and implement the policies of economic and technological development zones and certain special economic zones in Pudong. This was a landmark event in the development and opening up of Pudong. On May 3, 1990, the Pudong Development Office of the Shanghai Municipal People's Government was established.

The State Council (State Letter [1992] No. 145) approved the establishment of Shanghai Pudong New Area on October 11, 1992. The scope of Pudong New Area includes the former Chuansha County, Sanlin Township of Shanghai County, the east part of the Huangpu River in Huangpu District, the east part of the Huangpu River in Nanshi District, and the south part of the Huangpu River in Yangpu District.

On August 6, 2000, the Pudong New Area People's Government was formally established, and the Pudong New Area People's Congress and the Pudong New Area Committee of the Chinese People's Political Consultative Conference were successively established.

On June 21, 2005, the State Council Premier's Office Meeting approved Pudong New Area as the first comprehensive reform pilot zone in mainland China, which is one of only three comprehensive reform pilot zones in China.

On April 24, 2009, the State Council (State Letter [2009] No. 52) approved the abolition of Nanhui District and the integration of Nanhui District's administrative area into Pudong New Area. The area of Pudong New Area doubled, making it the largest urban district in Shanghai.

== Supporting projects and policies ==
Shanghai formulated a “three firsts” strategy for the development of Pudong, namely infrastructure first, finance and trade first, and high-tech industrialization first, and established important development areas such as the Waigaoqiao Free Trade Zone, Lujiazui Finance and Trade Zone, and Jinqiao Export Processing Zone.

=== Infrastructure ===
Pudong lacks bridges to the outside and high-grade roads to the inside, so infrastructure construction has always accompanied the development process. In December 1991, the 8,346-meter-long Nanpu Bridge was completed and opened to traffic. It was the first bridge in the middle and lower reaches of the Huangpu River. After that, many bridges and tunnels such as the Yangpu Bridge were built one after another. Large-scale transportation facilities such as the Luoshan Road Interchange and the Longyang Road Interchange were also built in Pudong. The subway also runs to Pudong. In 1993, Deng Xiaoping climbed the Yangpu Bridge and inspected the construction of Pudong. He exclaimed: "I am happy to see the road today, which is better than reading ten years of books. " As of 2012, there are more than 20 bridges and tunnels crossing the Huangpu River to connect Pudong New Area and Puxi.

The construction of Waigaoqiao New Port Area began in July 1991 and was officially opened on October 30, 1993. A 900-meter-long wharf with four 10,000-ton berths was built. In December 1991, the construction of Shanghai Waigaoqiao Power Plant started. The planned installed capacity was 5.4 million kilowatts, which was the largest thermal power plant planned at the time. It was completed in November 1997. Pudong International Airport was put into use in 1999 and has become one of the largest airports in China in terms of passenger traffic. Yangshan Port was completed in 2005 and has been the world's largest container port since 2010.

=== Financial trade ===
Starting from 1990, various banks began to establish branches in Pudong. By 1991, all major Chinese banks, including the Agricultural Bank of China, China Construction Bank, Industrial and Commercial Bank of China, Bank of Communications, China Merchants Bank, and Bank of China, had established branches in Pudong.

The Shanghai Stock Exchange was approved by the People's Bank of China on November 1, 1990, and officially opened on December 19. In February 1991, the national-level grain and oil exchange was planned and built in the Zhangyang Road Financial and Trade Center in Pudong, and was completed in April 1996. Later, according to the decision of the State Council of China, the Shanghai Metal Exchange, Shanghai Grain and Oil Commodity Exchange, and Shanghai Commodity Exchange were merged into the Shanghai Futures Exchange, which began operations in December 1999.

In September 1990, Shanghai Waigaoqiao Free Trade Zone Development Company and Shanghai Lujiazui Financial and Trade Zone Development Company were established. In August 1990, the State Council approved the establishment of a free trade zone in Shanghai Pudong Waigaoqiao. Construction began in August 1991 and the project was completed and put into operation in March 1992. By May 2003, after six expansions of customs supervision area isolation facilities, the closed-off operation area reached 8.5 square kilometers.

=== High-tech ===
In September 1990, Shanghai Jinqiao Export Processing Zone Development Company was established. In September 2001, Jinqiao Export Processing Zone was established with the approval of the General Administration of Customs. The planned area is 20 square kilometers, with 16 square kilometers of modern industrial park and modern commercial park in the east and 4 square kilometers of modern living park and management service center in the west.

In July 1992, Shanghai Zhangjiang Hi-Tech Park was established as a national high-tech industrial development zone with a planned area of 25 square kilometers. In August 1999, the Shanghai Municipal Party Committee and Municipal Government issued the strategic decision of "Focusing on Zhangjiang", which clearly stated that the park would focus on integrated circuits, software, and biomedicine as the leading industries, and concentrate on the main functions of innovation and entrepreneurship.

== Influence ==
=== Development of Pudong ===
Pudong's gross regional product (GRP) increased more than 60 times in the 20 years after 1990, and its share of Shanghai's economy gradually approached 30%. Shanghai's economy also maintained an annual growth rate of more than 10% for more than ten consecutive years, once again consolidating its position as China's economic, financial and trade center.

Economic comparison of Pudong New Area between 1993 and 2009
Economic indicators (100 million yuan)	Gross Regional Product	Primary Industry	Secondary Industry	The tertiary industry	Total industrial output value	Fixed asset investment	Total fiscal revenue	Total import and export volume
1993	60 (1990)	2.1	114.5	47.4	604.4	14.2	11.2	25.9
2009	4001.4	30.6	1706.3	2264.5	7038.2	1420.8	1356.0	1389.9
multiple	66.7	14.6	14.9	47.8	11.6	100.1	121.1	53.7

By the end of 2009, Lujiazui Finance and Trade Zone had gathered 556 financial institutions, accounting for 70% of the total in Shanghai; Zhangjiang High-tech Park had gathered 128 major national science and technology projects, 42 national and municipal public technology service platforms, 306 certified national high-tech enterprises, and more than 900 overseas student enterprises. The operating income of the integrated circuit industry in the park accounted for about 20% of the national total; the total industrial output value of Jinqiao Export Processing Zone exceeded 230 billion yuan.

=== Impact on the Yangtze River Delta ===
Pudong New Area is not only the core functional area for Shanghai to build an international economic, trade, financial and shipping center, and provides solid support for the rapid development of Shanghai's national economy, but also has become the leader of the Yangtze River Delta economic development. Through Shanghai, it has a radiating effect on the Yangtze River Delta economic zone and promoted the rapid development of the regional economy. Pudong has attracted high-end manufacturing and service industries, making the Yangtze River Delta's industrial chain have a certain level of hierarchy. As a financial center, it has created good conditions for financing in the Yangtze River Delta region. Yangshan Port and Pudong International Airport provide good passenger and cargo transportation capabilities, which help the import and export trade in the Yangtze River Delta region.

== Aftermath ==
After Pudong was opened up, the saying "one year one change, three years one big change" was used to describe the achievements of Pudong's opening up. On February 17, 1992, when Deng Xiaoping visited Shanghai, he said that he did not choose to open up Shanghai first, but chose to open up the four special economic zones in the south first, mainly for geographical and foreign investment considerations, which resulted in "Pudong's late development, which was my mistake".
