= Chi Rongliang =

Chinese footballer (born 1978)

Personal information
- Date of birth: 9 January 1978 (age 48)
- Place of birth: Tianjin, China
- Height: 1.78 m (5 ft 10 in)
- Positions: Midfielder; winger; fullback

Senior career*
Years	Team	Apps	(Gls)
1997–2009	Tianjin TEDA	167	(9)
Total		167	(9)

International career
1998	China	2	(0)

Managerial career
- 2015: Tianjin Tianhai (assistant)
- 2016–2018: Tianjin TEDA (assistant)
- 2017: Tianjin TEDA (interim)
- 2019-2021: Tianjin TEDA (coordinator)
Medal record
Men's football
Representing China
Asian Games
Bronze medal – third place	1998 Bangkok	Football
East Asian Games
Bronze medal – third place	1997 Busan	Football
AFC Youth Championship
Silver medal – second place	1996 َ South Korea	Team
- * Club domestic league appearances and goals

Chi Rongliang (simplified Chinese: 迟嵘亮; traditional Chinese: 遲嵘亮; pinyin: Chí Róngliàng; born 9 January 1978) is a former Chinese footballer who played as a midfielder for the China national football team.

== Career statistics ==
=== Club ===
Club	Season	League			Cup		Continental		Other		Total	
Club	Season	Division	Apps	Goals	Apps	Goals	Apps	Goals	Apps	Goals	Apps	Goals
Tianjin TEDA	1997	Jia-A	18	2	0	0	–		0	0	18	2
Tianjin TEDA	1998	Jia-B	–									
Tianjin TEDA	1999	Jia-A	19	2	0	0	–		0	0	19	2
Tianjin TEDA	2000	Jia-A	18	1	0	0	–		0	0	18	1
Tianjin TEDA	2001	Jia-A	22	1	0	0	–		0	0	22	1
Tianjin TEDA	2002	Jia-A	18	1	0	0	–		0	0	18	1
Tianjin TEDA	2003	Jia-A	7	2	0	0	–		0	0	7	2
Tianjin TEDA	2004	Chinese Super League	14	0	0	0	–		0	0	14	0
Tianjin TEDA	2005	Chinese Super League	5	0	0	0	–		0	0	5	0
Tianjin TEDA	2006	Chinese Super League	4	0	0	0	–		0	0	4	0
Tianjin TEDA	2007	Chinese Super League	21	0	0	0	–		0	0	21	0
Tianjin TEDA	2008	Chinese Super League	18	0	0	0	–		0	0	18	0
Tianjin TEDA	2009	Chinese Super League	3	0	0	0	–		0	0	3	0
Career total			167	9	0	0	0	0	0	0	167	9

=== International ===
National team	Year	Apps	Goals
China	1998	2	0
Total		2	0
