= Orbbec =

Robotics and AI vision company

Orbbec Inc.
- Native name: 奥比中光科技集团股份有限公司
- Company type: Public
- Traded as: SSE: 688322
- Industry: AI vision and 3D sensing
- Founded: 2013
- Headquarters: Shenzhen, China
- Area served: Global
- Key people: Howard Huang (Founder, Chairman, and CEO)
- Products: List: Cameras; LiDAR scanners; Contract manufacturer services for robotics
- Revenue: CN¥941 million (2025); CN¥203 million (2026 Q1)
- Total equity: CN¥35 billion
- Number of employees: 888
- Website: www.orbbec.com

Orbbec (officially Orbbec Inc.) is a Chinese technology company specializing in the design and manufacture of 3D vision sensors, AI algorithms, and visual perception solutions. Founded in 2013 and headquartered in Shenzhen, China, with significant operations in Troy, Michigan, the company produces a wide range of hardware including structured light, Time of Flight (ToF), LiDAR, and stereo vision cameras. Its technology is widely integrated into diverse industries such as robotics, logistics, healthcare, and retail to enable advanced spatial mapping and human-machine interaction.

== History ==
Howard Huang, an engineer working in postdoctoral academic research, founded Orbbec in 2013 with hopes of extending his research into real-world applications. Now in his forties, Huang is the company's largest shareholder, with 27% ownership of the multi-billion dollar firm.

The company's initial success came in 2017 when it signed a deal with Ant Group to integrate its 3D vision cameras into a facial recognition system for payment transactions with Alipay. In 2018, the company secured a deal with Chinese maker of smartphones Oppo to enable the first Android with 3D facial recognition for biometric authentication.

In 2025, Orbbec received some attention for its role in providing the "eyes" in a bipedal robot called Tien Kung Ultra, which won a 100-meter race against many other robotic competitors at the World Humanoid Robot Games. The company is projected to expand significantly in the global robotics market, with the first nine months of 2025 transitioning to a $9.8 million net profit, after the previous year of more-than-equivalent losses.
