= Ma Mingzhe =

Chinese businessman (born 1955)

Ma Mingzhe (Chinese: 马明哲; born 1955) is a Chinese businessman who serves as the chairman of Ping An Insurance.

== Biography ==
Ma Mingzhe (Chinese: 马明哲; born 1955) co-founded Ping An Insurance in 1988 as China's first joint-stock insurer, and the company has grown into a financial group covering insurance, banking and investment services. In June 2020, Ma has stepped down as chief executive and remained as chairman of the company.

Ma opened the doors of Ping An to foreign investors including HSBC, Morgan Stanley and Goldman Sachs. His company was one of the earliest companies to launch a successful float on a huge scale in Hong Kong. The Times calls him "a seasoned infighter who engineered the emergence of Ping An as an independent insurer from its earlier domination by the Chinese state banks, which were its principal shareholders."

He was named 3rd on Forbes China's 2020 ranking of China's best 50 CEOs. He also received one of the "Directors of the Year Awards" from The Hong Kong Institute of Directors in 2023.

== Career and education ==
Founding of Ping An Insurance and early career Ma has worked in the insurance industry for his entire career. In the mid-1980s, Ma worked as a young assistant manager at China Merchants Group's social security office in Shenzhen's Shekou district. He persuaded senior executive Yuan Geng, who later retired as group vice chairman, to allow him to explore the possibility of helping the state-owned trading house set up an insurance unit. Ma then steered China Merchants' entry into the insurance business, establishing Ping An, China's first life insurer modeled after the West, in 1988. Ma recruited insurance industry executives from Taiwan and Hong Kong, bringing them to Shekou, then a burgeoning port district of Shenzhen, to help him set up an insurance company modeled on those in the West. In his book, Ping'an Xin Yu, or "Ping An's Language of the Heart," Ma presents a collection of essays about the firm's history, written by him and his team. They recount how they created modern insurance sales and management strategies tailor-made for China. The book references Confucius as the individual who embodies the best of traditional Chinese philosophers and Albert Einstein as the best in Western scientific philosophy.

Ma received his doctorate degree in Money and Banking from Zhongan University of Economics and Law.

== Philanthropy ==
In 2007, Ma Mingzhe and his family donated RMB 20 million (USD 2.66 million) to set up the Mingyuan Foundation under the China Soong Ching Ling Foundation. The donation increased to RMB 100 million (USD 13.3 million) in 2012.
