= René Lobello =

French football manager (born 1963)

Personal information
- Date of birth: 5 May 1963 (age 63)
- Place of birth: Chambéry, France
- Height: 1.86 m (6 ft 1 in)
- Position: Defender

Youth career
- 1968-1978: USAM Toulon
- 1978–1980: Mulhouse
- 1980–1981: Paris SG

Senior career*
Years	Team	Apps	(Gls)
1981–1982	Montceau Bourgogne		
1982–1983	La Seyne		
1983–1984	Mulhouse		
1984–1986	Carpentras		
1986–1989	Porto Vecchio		

Managerial career
- 1996–1997: Al-Shabab (assistant)
- 1997: Al-Wehda (assistant)
- 1998: Al Nassr (assistant)
- 1998–1999: Étoile du Sahel (assistant)
- 1999–2002: Sochaux (assistant)
- 2002–2003: Metz (assistant)
- 2003–2004: Étoile du Sahel
- 2004–2005: Neuchâtel Xamax
- 2005–2006: Young Boys (assistant)
- 2006–2007: USM Alger
- 2008–2011: Sochaux (assistant)
- 2011–2015: Bordeaux (assistant)
- 2015–2016: Shanghai Shenhua (assistant)
- 2016–2017: Saint-Étienne (assistant)
- 2017: Liaoning
- 2018: Tours
- 2020–2022: Porto Vecchio
- * Club domestic league appearances and goals

René Lobello (born 5 May 1963) is a French football manager and former player.

== Biography ==
Lobello was born in Chambéry. After his playing career, he became a coach in several countries, in Middle East, in North Africa but also in Switzerland.

Back in France, he worked in Metz and Sochaux before following Francis Gillot in Bordeaux and Shanghai.

He became assistant of coach Christophe Galtier, who wanted to expand his staff at AS Saint-Étienne in June 2016, he left the club a year later following the departure of the French coach.

He joined Chinese Super League club Liaoning Hongyun in August 2017. After a last place in the ranking, he was fired in September 2017 after only seven league games.

Lobello was appointed manager of newly relegated Championnat National side Tours FC in June 2018. He left the club in December 2018.

From July 2020 to January 2022, he coached the team in Corsica, AS Ponte Vecchio.

On 29 June 2023, he moved to Italy, where he became the new coach of Alessandria Calcio. The following month, on 10 July, due to corporate problems, he left his post.

== Honors ==
- French Champion of French Ligue 2 in 2001 D2 with Sochaux
- Winner of the African Cup Winners' Cup in 2003 with Étoile sportive du Sahel
- Winner of the Asian Cup Winners' Cup in 1998 with Al Nasr Riyad
- Winner of the French Cup in 2013 with Bordeaux
