= Renatinho (footballer, born May 1988) =

Brazilian footballer

Personal information
- Full name: Renato Costa Silva
- Date of birth: May 1, 1988 (age 38)
- Place of birth: Goiânia, Brazil
- Height: 1.74 m (5 ft 8 1/2 in)
- Position: Right back

Team information
- Current team: Plácido de Castro

Youth career
- 2005–2008: Atlético Goianiense

Senior career*
Years	Team	Apps	(Gls)
2008–2010	Atlético Goianiense	1	(0)
2008	→ Novo Horizonte (loan)	?	(?)
2009	→ Aparecidense (loan)	?	(?)
2009	→ Inhumas (loan)	?	(?)
2010	→ Cristalina (loan)	?	(?)
2010	→ Inhumas (loan)	?	(?)
2011–	Plácido de Castro		
- * Club domestic league appearances and goals

Renato Costa Silva, the Renatinho born in Goiânia is a Brazilian footballer, who is currently playing for Plácido de Castro.

== Career ==
Played in the Inhumas and Atlético Goianiense.

=== Career statistics ===
(Correct as of October 16, 2010)

Club	Season	State League		Brazilian Série A		Copa do Brasil		Copa Sudamericana		Total	
Club	Season	Apps	Goals	Apps	Goals	Apps	Goals	Apps	Goals	Apps	Goals
Atlético Goianiense	2010	-	-	1	0	-	-	-	-	1	0
Total		-	-	1	0	-	-	-	-	1	0

== Contract ==
- Atlético Goianiense.

== See also ==
- Football in Brazil
- List of football clubs in Brazil
