= Shantou Special Economic Zone =

Shantou Special Economic Zone (Chinese: 汕头经济特区), located within Shantou, Guangdong, is one of the five special economic zones in the People's Republic of China.

Its establishment was approved by the State Council in 1981, when it then covered only the Longhu District. In November 1984, the special economic zone was expanded to cover the Guang'ao District, with a total area of 52.6 square kilometres. It was subsequently expanded in November 1991, with the approval of the State Council in April 1991, to 234 square kilometres, covering the entire urban area of Shantou.
