= Ping An Insurance =

Chinese insurance company

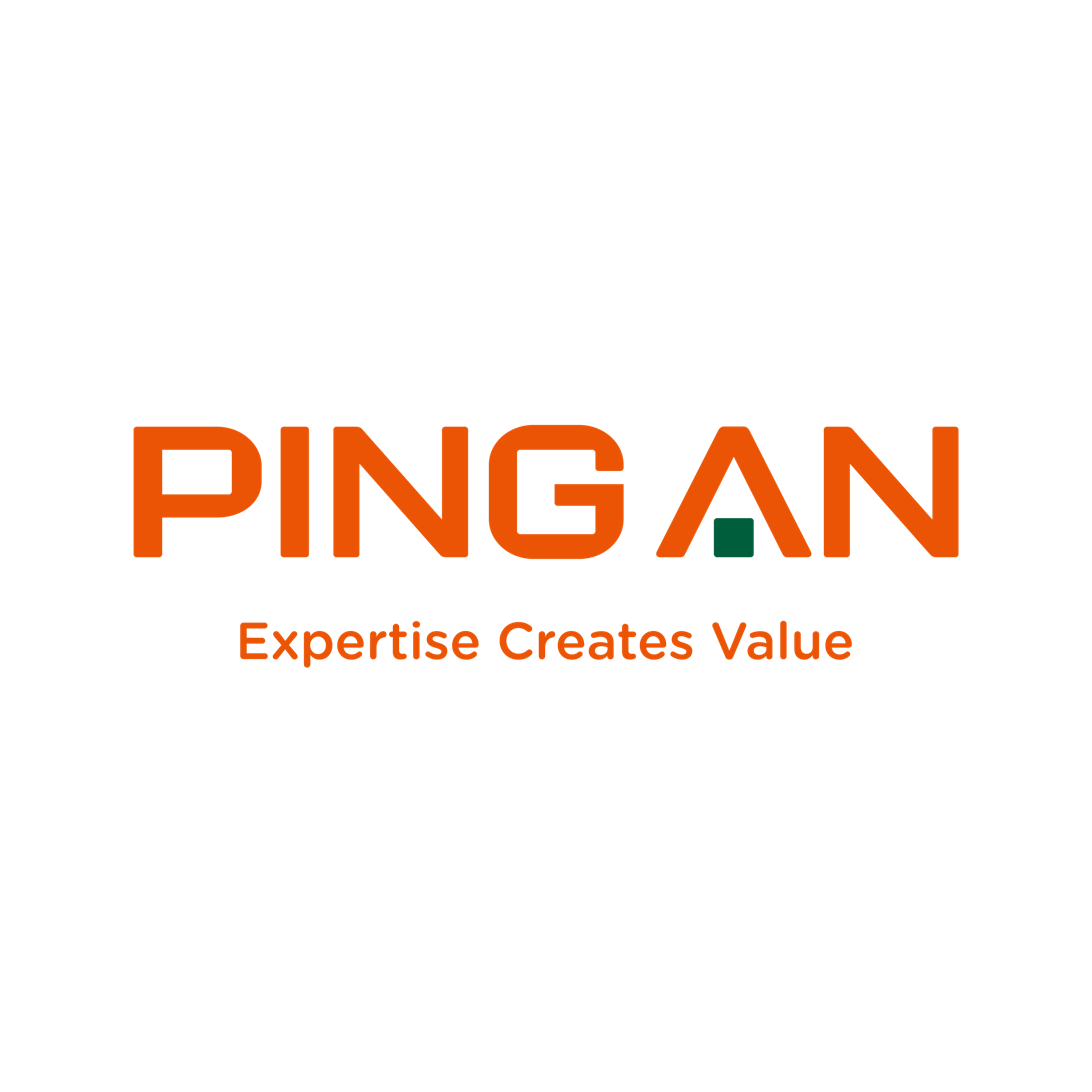

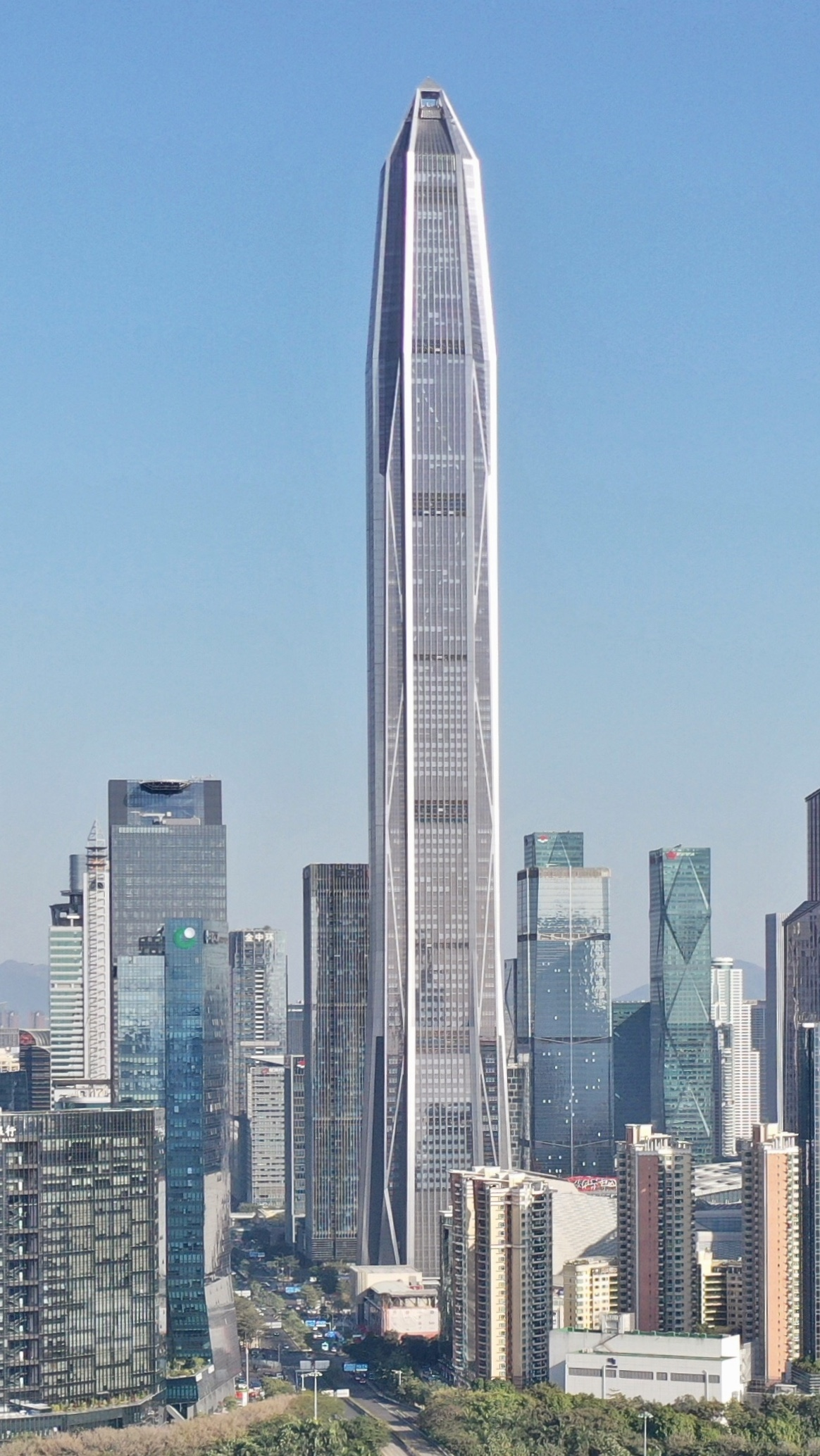
- Headquarters at Ping An International Finance Centre
- Native name: 中国平安保险
- Type: Public
- Traded as: SSE: 601318 (A share); SEHK: 2318 (H share); SEHK: 82318 (Yuan share); CSI 300 Index component; Hang Seng Index component; S&P Asia 50 component
- Industry: Financial services
- Founded: 1988; 38 years ago
- Founder: Ma Mingzhe
- Headquarters: Shenzhen, China
- Area served: Worldwide
- Key people: Ma Mingzhe (chairman); Xie Yonglin (president and Co-CEO); Michael Guo (Co-CEO and Senior Vice President)
- Services: Insurance; Life insurance; Health insurance; Property insurance; Casualty Insurance; Banking; Asset Management; Health and senior care
- Revenue: ▲CN¥1,050.5 billion (FY25)
- Operating income: ▲CN¥134.4 billion (FY25)
- Net income: ▲CN¥134.8 billion (FY25)
- Total assets: ▲CN¥13,898.5 billion (FY25)
- Total equity: ▲CN¥1,000.4 billion (FY25)
- Owners: CP Group Ltd. (5.30%); Shenzhen Investment Holdings Co., Ltd.(5.29%); (as of 31 December 2024)
- Number of employees: ▼258,806 (FY25)
- Website: https://group.pingan.com
- Footnotes in a consolidated basis

Ping An Insurance known also as Ping An of China (simplified Chinese: 中国平安; traditional Chinese: 中國平安; pinyin: Zhōngguó Píng Ān), full name Ping An Insurance (Group) Company of China, Ltd. is a Chinese financial services holding company whose subsidiaries provide insurance, banking, asset management, financial services. The company was founded in 1988 and is headquartered in Shenzhen. "Ping An" literally means "safe and well".

In 2024, Ping An ranked 29th on the Forbes Global 2000 list and 53rd on the Fortune Global 500 list. Ping An has been ranked by Brand Finance as the world's most valuable insurance brand for six years running.

Ping An Insurance is one of the top 50 companies in the Shanghai Stock Exchange. It is also a constituent stock of Hang Seng Index, an index of the top companies in the Hong Kong Stock Exchange. Ping An Insurance was also included in the pan-China stock indices CSI 300 Index, FTSE China A50 Index and Hang Seng China 50 Index.

== Business ==
Ping An Insurance Group started off in 1988 as a property and casualty insurance company, later diversifying into insurance, banking, asset management, financial services and healthcare services. Ping An has licenses to offer financial services, including insurance, banking, trusts, securities, futures and financial leasing.

Ping An has also adopted an integrated financial model on a mix of business lines, including life insurance, P&C insurance, banking and securities. The company invests 1% of its revenues into R&D each year to branch out its businesses, adopt technology and support the building of its healthcare and senior care ecosystem.

Since the mid-1990s, Ping An has been subsequently taken investments from overseas firms such as Morgan Stanley and Goldman Sachs in 1994. In 2002 HSBC took a large equity interest in Ping An. In early 2008, Ping An agreed to take a 50% share in Fortis Investments, a subsidiary of Fortis, which had taken over ABN AMRO Asset Management as a result of the split up of ABN AMRO in late 2007; the deal was canceled in October 2008.

In June 2009, Ping An became a strategic investor in Shenzhen Development Bank (now part of Ping An Bank).

In 2012, the company created Ping An Ventures, a $150M VC fund which invested in over 100 companies, such as Didi Chuxing, Hycor Biomedical, Meituan, Oscar Health, Payoneer, Taulia, and others. In 2014, together with SBT Venture Capital Ping An led a $27M funding round for eToro.

In 2016, Ping An Healthcare and Technology (Ping An Good Doctor) completed a Series A funding round of a total of US$500 million, making its valuation hit US$3 billion. Ping An also bought a 48% stake in Chinese car website Autohome Inc. from Telstra Corp. for $1.6 billion.

In February 2018, three technology subsidiaries of Ping An completed private placement financing, which received positive responses particularly from international institutional investors. They were Ping An Healthcare and Technology Company Limited, Ping An Medical and Healthcare Management Co., Ltd and OneConnect Financial Technology Co., LTD.

In June 2019, Ping An One Connect Bank officially commenced operation after receiving a virtual banking license from the Hong Kong Monetary Authority in May 2019. In December 2019, OneConnect Financial Technology was listed on the New York Stock Exchange. In 2019, Ping An became the first insurance company from mainland China to be selected for the Dow Jones Sustainability Emerging Markets Index (DJSI). In October 2020, Lufax, one of China's leading online wealth management platform, listed on the New York Stock Exchange.

In May 2021, Ping An released the Ping An Zhen Yi Nian healthcare brand. The product line was mainly targeted at supporting urban elderly care communities, and integrates corporate finance, medical care and health technology. In July 2021, Ping An and Shionogi signed agreements to launch joint ventures in Shanghai and Hong Kong. Ping An-Shionogi is a Healthcare as a Service (HaaS) enterprise, an integrated medical and healthcare platform for public health and patients. The joint venture is a collaboration between the Ping An and Shionogi on drug research, development, production and sales. In October 2021, Ping An Bank rolled out services under the Cross-boundary Wealth Management Connect pilot scheme.

In January 2022, Ping An Life (a subsidiary of Ping An) received approval from the CBIRC for its investment in New Founder Group. In July 2022, OneConnect (Ping An's fintech subsidiary) listed on the main board of the Hong Kong Stock Exchange by way of introduction and dual-primary listing. In February 2023, Ping An Bank Hong Kong Branch was granted an insurance agency license by the Hong Kong Insurance Authority. In November 2023, it was entered into the MSCI KLD 400 Social Index.

As of 30 June 2024, Ping An has grown its health ecosystem in China by partnering with the country's top 100 hospitals and 3A hospitals, 50,000 in-house and contracted external doctors and 233,000 pharmacies. Ping An's home-based senior care services covered 64 cities across China with over 120,000 customers entitled to the benefits. Customer's entitled to service benefits in the healthcare and elderlycare ecosystem accounted for over 68% of Ping An Life's new business value in 2024.

In February 2025, Ping An Healthcare and Technology announced that its artificial intelligence model and its platform designed for doctors now have built in access to DeepSeek's model. Ping An said access to DeepSeek's model will help to further enhance its medical services by assisting doctors in making more accurate diagnoses and providing personalized health management. Ping An Healthcare and Technology is undergoing further research and development of AI technology.

== Ownership ==
Ping An is a publicly listed company.

As of 30 June 2024, CP Group Ltd. indirectly held 964,427,077 H shares of the Company, representing approximately 5.30% of the total share capital of the Company.

Ping An has the classification of a civilian-run enterprise. Richard McGregor, author of The Party: The Secret World of China's Communist Rulers, said that "the true ownership of large chunks of its shares remains unclear" and that the ownership of Ping An is a "murky structure". In October 2012, The New York Times reported that relatives and associates of Chinese Premier Wen Jiabao controlled stakes in Ping An worth at least US$2.2 billion in 2007.

== Markets ==
Since 24 June 2004 Ping An has been listed on the Stock Exchange of Hong Kong (subsidiary of Hong Kong Exchanges and Clearing) as SEHK: 2318. Since 1 March 2007, it has a listing on the Shanghai Stock Exchange as SSE: 601318. Since 19 June 2023, its yuan-denominated shares has a listing on the Stock Exchange of Hong Kong as SEHK: 82318.

Ping An replaced Anhui Expressway in the Hang Seng China Enterprises Index (HSCEI) in 2004.

The Hang Seng Index Services Company announced on 11 May 2007, that Ping An would join as Hang Seng Index Constituent Stock effective on 4 June 2007.

== Operations ==
Ping An has operations across all of mainland China, and in Hong Kong and Macau through Ping An Insurance Overseas. Lufax, OneConnect and Ping An Good Doctor have now expanded overseas. OneConnect serves 100+ customers in 20 countries and regions mainly in Southeast Asia.

== Finances ==
Year	Revenue (US$ billions)	Profit (US$ billions)	Assets (US$ billions)	Equity (US$ billions)	Employees	Fortune Global 500 rank (following year)
2014	86.0	6.4	645.7	46.7	235,999	96
2015	110.3	8.6	733.8	51.5	275,011	41
2016	116.6	9.4	802.5	55.2	318,588	39
2017	144.2	13.2	997.1	72.7	342,550	29
2018	163.6	16.2	1,040.4	81.1	376,900	29
2019	184.3	21.6	1,180.5	96.6	372,194	21
2020	191.5	20.7	1,460.2	116.9	362,035	16
2021	199.6	15.8	1,596.6	127.9	355,982	25
2022	181.6	12.5	1,614.7	124.5	344,223	33
2023	145.8	12.1	1,632.0	126.7	288,751	53
2024	158.6	17.6	1,775.2	127.2	273,053	47
2025	158.6	18.8	1,987.5	143.1	258,806	48

== See also ==
- Ping An Bank
