= 2018 Guangzhou R&F F.C. season =

Guangzhou R&F 2018
- Head coach: Dragan Stojković
- Stadium: Yuexiushan Stadium
- Super League: 8th
- FA Cup: Semi-Finals
- Top goalscorer: League: Eran Zahavi (16 goals); All: Eran Zahavi (18 goals)
- Highest home attendance: 12,996 vs Guangzhou Evergrande Taobao; 5 August 2018 (Chinese Super League)
- Lowest home attendance: 9,836 vs Jiangsu Suning; 25 July 2018 (Chinese FA Cup)
- Average home league attendance: 10,708
Home colours	Away colours

The 2018 Guangzhou R&F season is the 8th year in Guangzhou R&F's existence and its 8th season in the Chinese football league, also its 7th season in the top flight.

== Review ==
- 8 November 2017, Guangzhou R&F confirmed that Dragan Stojković signed a renewed contract with Guangzhou R&F until the end of the 2021.
- 5 December 2017, Guangzhou R&F confirmed that Huang Zhengyu signed a renewed contract with Guangzhou R&F until the end of the 2022.
- 25 December 2017, Guangzhou R&F confirmed that Cheng Yuelei signed a renewed contract with Guangzhou R&F until the end of the 2022.
- 15 January 2018, Guangzhou R&F confirmed that Zhang Chenlong signed a renewed contract with Guangzhou R&F until the end of the 2021.
- 26 February 2018, Guangzhou R&F confirmed that Eran Zahavi signed a renewed contract with Guangzhou R&F until the end of the 2020.
- 28 February 2018, Guangzhou R&F confirmed that Renatinho signed a renewed contract with Guangzhou R&F until the end of the 2020.
- 25 April 2018, Guangzhou R&F confirmed that Yi Teng signed a renewed contract with Guangzhou R&F until the end of the 2022.
- 26 April 2018, Guangzhou R&F confirmed that Lu Lin signed a renewed contract with Guangzhou R&F until the end of the 2020.

== Coaching and medical staff ==
Position	Staff
Head coach	(Serbia) Dragan Stojković
Assistant coaches	(Serbia) Žarko Đurović (to May 16)
Assistant coaches	(Serbia) Dejan Govedarica
Fitness coaches	(Japan) Katsuhito Kinoshi
Fitness coaches	(South Africa) Divan Augustyn (from June)
Goalkeeper coach	(China) Huang Hongtao
Team leader	(China) Huang Jun
Team physicians	(Netherlands) Marco van der Steen
Team physicians	(China) Mai Zhiyuan
Team physicians	(China) Fan Bihua
Performance manager	(United States) Bito Wu
Interpreters	(China) Hong Wenjie
Interpreters	(China) Weng Zhanhong

Source: Guangzhou R&F F.C.

== Squad ==
=== Winter ===
As of 1 March 2018

==== First team ====
Note: Flags indicate national team as defined under FIFA eligibility rules; some limited exceptions apply. Players may hold more than one non-FIFA nationality.

No.	Pos.	Nation	Player
1	GK	CHN	Cheng Yuelei
4	MF	CHN	Zhang Gong
5	MF	CHN	Zhang Jiaqi
6	MF	CHN	Cai Haojian
7	FW	ISR	Eran Zahavi
8	MF	BRA	Júnior Urso
9	FW	CHN	Chang Feiya
10	MF	BRA	Renatinho
11	DF	CHN	Ding Haifeng
14	FW	SRB	Marko Perović
17	DF	CHN	Zhang Chenlong
18	DF	CHN	Yi Teng (Captain)
19	DF	CHN	Jiang Jihong
20	DF	CHN	Tang Miao
22	DF	CHN	Zheng Zhiming

No.	Pos.	Nation	Player
23	MF	CHN	Lu Lin
24	FW	CHN	Mai Jiajian
25	GK	CHN	Han Feng
26	FW	CHN	Ma Junliang
29	FW	CHN	Xiao Zhi
31	MF	CHN	Wang Jia'nan
32	MF	CHN	Chen Zhizhao
34	DF	CHN	Wang Xin
35	DF	CHN	Li Tixiang
36	DF	CHN	Huang Zhengyu
37	MF	CHN	Li Yuyang
38	MF	CHN	Chen Yajun
39	GK	CHN	Shen Shuaishuai
40	DF	CHN	Chen Weiming

==== Reserve team ====
Note: Flags indicate national team as defined under FIFA eligibility rules; some limited exceptions apply. Players may hold more than one non-FIFA nationality.

No.	Pos.	Nation	Player
41	DF	CHN	Liu Jiale
42	DF	CHN	Liang Zhanchong
43	FW	CHN	Huang Zihao
44	FW	CHN	Fang Jinzhao
45	GK	CHN	Long Wenhao

No.	Pos.	Nation	Player
46	DF	CHN	Deng Zhiyao
49	FW	CHN	Huang Jingbin
50	DF	CHN	Zhang Jianjun
51	MF	CHN	Zhang Chaoqun

=== Summer ===
As of 17 July 2018

==== First team ====
Note: Flags indicate national team as defined under FIFA eligibility rules; some limited exceptions apply. Players may hold more than one non-FIFA nationality.

No.	Pos.	Nation	Player
1	GK	CHN	Cheng Yuelei
3	DF	SRB	Duško Tošić
4	MF	CHN	Zhang Gong
5	MF	CHN	Zhang Jiaqi
6	MF	CHN	Cai Haojian
7	FW	ISR	Eran Zahavi
8	MF	BRA	Júnior Urso
9	FW	CHN	Chang Feiya
10	MF	BRA	Renatinho
11	DF	CHN	Ding Haifeng
16	FW	CHN	Li Rui
17	DF	CHN	Zhang Chenlong
18	DF	CHN	Yi Teng
19	DF	CHN	Jiang Jihong
20	DF	CHN	Tang Miao
22	DF	CHN	Zheng Zhiming

No.	Pos.	Nation	Player
23	MF	CHN	Lu Lin (Captain)
24	FW	CHN	Mai Jiajian
25	GK	CHN	Han Feng
26	FW	CHN	Ma Junliang
27	MF	CHN	Zhang Jiajie
29	FW	CHN	Xiao Zhi
30	MF	CHN	Wang Peng
32	MF	CHN	Chen Zhizhao
34	DF	CHN	Wang Xin
35	MF	CHN	Li Tixiang
36	DF	CHN	Huang Zhengyu
37	MF	CHN	Li Yuyang
38	MF	CHN	Chen Yajun
39	GK	CHN	Shen Shuaishuai
40	DF	CHN	Chen Weiming

==== Reserve team ====
Note: Flags indicate national team as defined under FIFA eligibility rules; some limited exceptions apply. Players may hold more than one non-FIFA nationality.

No.	Pos.	Nation	Player
14	MF	SRB	Marko Perović
31	MF	CHN	Wang Jia'nan
41	DF	CHN	Liu Jiale
42	DF	CHN	Liang Zhanchong
43	FW	CHN	Huang Zihao
44	FW	CHN	Fang Jinzhao
45	GK	CHN	Long Wenhao
46	DF	CHN	Deng Zhiyao
47	MF	CHN	Pan Jiajun

No.	Pos.	Nation	Player
48	GK	CHN	Chen Zirong
49	FW	CHN	Huang Jingbin
50	DF	CHN	Zhang Jianjun
51	MF	CHN	Zhang Chaoqun
52	MF	CHN	Yao Jialin
56	MF	CHN	Deng Yanlin
57	MF	CHN	Chen Fuhai
58	DF	CHN	Liang Yongfeng
59	MF	HKG	Tan Chun Lok

== Transfers ==
=== Winter ===
==== In ====
Squad number	Position	Player	Age	Moving from	Type	Transfer fee	Date	Source
6	MF	(China) Cai Haojian	22		Transfer	Free	17 November 2017	
22	DF	(China) Zheng Zhiming	18		Transfer	Free	17 November 2017	
38	DMF	(China) Chen Yajun	18		Transfer	Free	17 November 2017	
9	RMF	(China) Chang Feiya	24	(China) Guizhou Hengfeng Zhicheng	Loan return		1 January 2018	
-	MF	(China) Min Junlin	23	(China) Guizhou Hengfeng Zhicheng	Loan return		1 January 2018	
-	DF	(China) Yang Ting	24	(China) Guizhou Hengfeng Zhicheng	Loan return		1 January 2018	
34	DF	(China) Wang Xin	20	(Denmark) Vejle BK	Transfer	Undisclosed	1 January 2018	
11	LB	(China) Ding Haifeng	26	Hebei China Fortune	Transfer	Swap deal	22 February 2018	
5	DMF	(China) Zhang Jiaqi	26	(China) Guangzhou Evergrande Taobao	Loan		25 February 2018	
14	LW	(Serbia) Marko Perović	34	R&F (Hong Kong)	Transfer	Free	25 February 2018	

==== Out ====
Squad number	Position	Player	Age	Moving to	Type	Transfer fee	Date	Source
5	DF	(Iceland) Sölvi Ottesen	33	(Iceland) Vikingur Reykjavik	Transfer	Free	30 November 2017	
14	MF	(China) Zeng Chao	24	(China) Meixian Techand	Transfer	€380,000	1 January 2018	
9	FW	(Australia) Apostolos Giannou	28	(Cyprus) AEK Larnaca	Transfer	Free	25 January 2018	
3	FW	(China) Xiang Baixu	22	(China) Shenzhen	Transfer	€1,900,000	30 January 2018	
-	DF	(China) Yang Ting	24	(China) Guizhou Hengfeng	Transfer	Undisclosed	9 February 2018	
11	LB	(China) Jiang Zhipeng	28	Hebei China Fortune	Transfer	€2,500,000+Swap deal	22 February 2018	
13	MF	(China) Ye Chugui	23	(China) Shenzhen	Loan out		24 February 2018	
-	MF	(China) Min Junlin	24	(China) Guizhou Hengfeng Zhicheng	Transfer	Undisclosed	26 February 2018	
6	MF	(China) Yang Wanshun	22	(China) Tianjin TEDA	Transfer	Free	28 February 2018	

=== Summer ===
==== In ====
Squad number	Position	Player	Age	Moving from	Type	Transfer fee	Date	Source
3	DF	(Serbia) Duško Tošić	33	(Turkey) Beşiktaş	Transfer	£4,050,000	18 May 2018	
59	MF	(Hong Kong) Tan Chun Lok	22	(Hong Kong) Tai Po	Transfer		13 July 2018	
16	FW	(China) Li Rui	24	(Portugal) Braga B	Transfer	Free	15 July 2018	
30	MF	(China) Wang Peng	20	(Portugal) Gondomar	Loan		15 July 2018	

== Friendlies ==
=== Pre-season ===
20 January 2018	Guangzhou R&F	3–0	Sichuan Longfor	Guangzhou, Guangdong
	Giannou; Zahavi; Renatinho			Stadium: Guangzhou Higher Education Mega Center Central Stadium Training Ground

26 January 2018	Guangzhou R&F	2–2	Heilongjiang Lava Spring	Guangzhou, Guangdong
15:00 UTC+8	Ding Haifeng; Mai Jiajian		Pan Yuchen ?	Stadium: Guangzhou Higher Education Mega Center Central Stadium Training Ground

1 February 2018	(Australia) Oakleigh Cannons	0–4	(China) Guangzhou R&F	Oakleigh, Victoria, Australia
19:30 UTC+11			Renatinho 19'; Urso 39'; Zahavi 63'; Mai Jiajian 73'	Stadium: Jack Edwards Reserve

3 February 2018	(Australia) South Melbourne	1–4	(China) Guangzhou R&F	Albert Park, Victoria, Australia
19:30 UTC+11			Renatinho (?); Zahavi (?); Ma Junliang (?)	Stadium: Lakeside Stadium

6 February 2018	(Australia) Melbourne City	1–4	(China) Guangzhou R&F	Victoria, Australia
17:30 UTC+11	Bruno Fornaroli 15'		Zahavi 26', 71'; Urso 45'; Lu Lin 55'

8 February 2018	(Australia) South Melbourne	3–0	(China) Guangzhou R&F	Albert Park, Victoria, Australia
19:30 UTC+11	Lujic 10'; Konstantinidis 35'; Brennan (?)			Stadium: Lakeside Stadium

11 February 2018	(Australia) Port Melbourne	1–6	(China) Guangzhou R&F	Port Melbourne, Victoria, Australia
16:00 UTC+11	? (?)		Zahavi (?); Renatinho (?); Urso (?); Chang Feiya (?)	Stadium: JL Murphy Reserve

13 February 2018	(Australia) Melbourne City	3–5	(China) Guangzhou R&F	Victoria, Australia
15:00 UTC+11			Zahavi (?); Urso (?); Chang Feiya (?)

24 February 2018	Guangzhou R&F	2–1	Meizhou Hakka	Guangzhou, Guangdong
	Urso (?); Chen Zhizhao (?)		John Mary (?)	Stadium: Guangzhou Higher Education Mega Center Central Stadium Training Ground

== Competitions ==
Win Draw Loss

=== Chinese Super League ===
==== Table ====
Pos	Team	Pld	W	D	L	GF	GA	GD	Pts
8	Beijing Renhe	30	9	10	11	33	46	−13	37
9	Tianjin Quanjian	30	9	9	12	41	48	−7	36 (Note: Tianjin Quanjian is ahead of Guangzhou R&F on head-to-head points: Tianjin Quanjian 2–1 Guangzhou R&F, Guangzhou R&F 2–6 Tianjin Quanjian.)
10	Guangzhou R&F	30	10	6	14	49	61	−12	36
11	Dalian Yifang	30	10	5	15	37	57	−20	35
12	Henan Jianye	30	10	4	16	30	45	−15	34

Source: League table
Rules for classification: 1) Points; 2) Head-to-head points; 3) Head-to-head goal difference; 4) Head-to-head goals scored; 5) Reserve league points; 6) U19 Elite league points; 7) Goal difference; 8) Goals scored; 9) Disciplinary points (1 point for each yellow card, 3 points for each red card); 10) Draw

==== Results by round ====
Round	1	2	3	4	5	6	7	8	9	10	11	12	13	14	15	16	17	18	19	20	21	22	23	24	25	26	27	28	29	30
Ground	A	H	H	A	H	A	H	A	H	A	H	A	H	A	H	H	A	A	H	A										
Result	W	W	L	W	L	L	L	W	W	D	D	L	D	D	W	L	L	L	W											
Position	5	3	6	5	7	7	9	7	5	7	6	8	9	9	6	7	9	10	8											

Updated to match(es) played on 18 August 2018. Source: Chinese Super League Table (in Chinese)
A = Away; H = Home; W = Win; D = Draw; L = Loss

==== Results summary ====
Overall								Home						Away					
Pld	W	D	L	GF	GA	GD	Pts	W	D	L	GF	GA	GD	W	D	L	GF	GA	GD
19	7	4	8	38	41	−3	25	4	2	4	23	22	+1	3	2	4	15	19	−4

Last updated: 18 August 2018.
Source: Competitive Matches

==== League Matches ====
2 March 2018 1	Guangzhou Evergrande Taobao	4–5	Guangzhou R&F	Guangzhou, Guangdong
19:35 UTC+8	Alan 13', 39', 45'; Huang Bowen (yellow card) 42'; Goulart 69' (pen.); Hu Ruibao (yellow card) 89'	Report	Zahavi 2', 10', 49'; Urso 65'; Ding Haifeng (yellow card) 71'; Xiao Zhi 75'; Urso (yellow card) 90+6'	Stadium: Tianhe Stadium; Attendance: 47,839; Referee: Fu Ming; Assistant referees: Zhang Cheng; Zhang Qiangjing; Fourth official: Ma Li

10 March 2018 2	Guangzhou R&F	2–0	Dalian Yifang	Guangzhou, Guangdong
19:35 UTC+8	Huang Zhengyu (yellow card) 26'; Yi Teng (yellow card) 52'; Chen Zhizhao 60'; Zahavi 65'	Report		Stadium: Yuexiushan Stadium; Attendance: 10,116; Referee: Wang Di; Assistant referees: Yi Xueyun; Tang Rongdi; Fourth official: Guo Baolong

18 March 2018 3	Guangzhou R&F	2–5	Shanghai SIPG	Guangzhou, Guangdong
15:30 UTC+8	Zahavi 4'; Xiao Zhi 9'	Report	Wu Lei 17', 27', 29', 73'; Oscar (yellow card) 38'; Hulk 53'	Stadium: Yuexiushan Stadium; Attendance: 11,626; Referee: Huang Yejun; Assistant referees: Song Xiangyun; Sun Kai; Fourth official: Zhao Zhizhi

31 March 2018 4	Changchun Yatai	1–2	Guangzhou R&F	Changchun, Jilin
15:30 UTC+8	Ighalo (penalty missed) 11' (pen.); He Chao (yellow card) 42'; Zhang Xiaofei 61'; Zhang Li (yellow card) 67'; Yu Rui (red card) 90+5'; Du Zhenyu (penalty missed) 90+10' (pen.); Ighalo (yellow card) 90+12'	Report	Zhang Chenlong (yellow card) 26'; Zahavi 78'; Renatinho 90+7' (pen.); Cheng Yuelei (yellow card) 90+10'	Stadium: Changchun Stadium; Referee: Ma Li; Assistant referees: Huo Weiming; Jiang Bo; Fourth official: Niu Minghui

6 April 2018 5	Guangzhou R&F	0–2	Jiangsu Suning	Guangzhou, Guangdong
19:35 UTC+8	Xiao Zhi (yellow card) 20'; Jiang Jihong (yellow card) 39'	Report	Huang Zichang 48'; Teixeira 60' (pen.); Tian Yinong (yellow card) 71'	Stadium: Yuexiushan Stadium; Attendance: 10,428; Referee: Shen Yinhao; Assistant referees: Zhang Cheng; Deng Bo; Fourth official: Wu Liying; Video assistant: Zhang Lei

14 April 2018 6	Tianjin TEDA	2–1	Guangzhou R&F	Tianjin
15:30 UTC+8	Bai Yuefeng (yellow card) 5'; Mikel 27'; Hui Jiakang 29'; Zhao Honglüe (yellow card) 77'; Du Jia (yellow card) 90+1'	Report	Chen Zhizhao 8'; Jiang Jihong (yellow card) 66'; Renatinho (yellow card) 90+1'	Stadium: Tianjin Olympic Center Stadium; Attendance: 8,566; Referee: Ai Kun; Assistant referees: Yu Yue; Ma Kexi; Fourth official: Zhang Long; Video assistant: Fu Ming

21 April 2018 7	Guangzhou R&F	2–4	Shandong Luneng Taishan	Guangzhou, Guangdong
19:35 UTC+8	Xiao Zhi 29', 81'; Zahavi (penalty missed) 37' (pen.)	Report	Tardelli (yellow card) 30'; Gil 52'; Jin Jingdao 59'; Pellè 70'; Tardelli 86'	Stadium: Yuexiushan Stadium; Attendance: 10,050; Referee: Zhang Lei; Assistant referees: Song Xiangyun; Yang Li; Fourth official: Hei Xiaohu; Video assistant: Lin Jun

29 April 2018 8	Chongqing Lifan	0–1	Guangzhou R&F	Chongqing
19:35 UTC+8	Peng Xinli (yellow card) 73'	Report	Renatinho 39'; Tang Miao (yellow card) 88'	Stadium: Chongqing Olympic Sports Center; Attendance: 37,960; Referee: Ma Li; Assistant referees: Huo Weiming; Zhang Hongwei; Fourth official: Niu Minghui; Video assistant: Wang Wei

5 May 2018 9	Guangzhou R&F	4–2	Shanghai Greenland Shenhua	Guangzhou, Guangdong
19:35 UTC+8	Ma Junliang 2'; Zahavi 20'; Renatinho 37'; Urso (yellow card) 56'; Chang Feiya 90+2'	Report	Li Xiaoming (red card) 21'; Qin Sheng (yellow card) 29'; Gao Di 60'; Li Peng 66'	Stadium: Yuexiushan Stadium; Attendance: 10,013; Referee: Shi Zhenlu; Assistant referees: Shi Xiang; Yu Yue; Fourth official: Liu Lin; Video assistant: Gu Chunhan

11 May 2018 10	Beijing Sinobo Guoan	2–2	Guangzhou R&F	Beijing
19:35 UTC+8	Bakambu 8', 83'; Zhang Yu (yellow card) 23'; Yu Yang (yellow card) 66'; Hou Sen (yellow card) 75'	Report	Zahavi 12', 75'; Tang Miao (yellow card) 77'	Stadium: Workers' Stadium; Attendance: 40,191; Referee: Wang Di; Assistant referees: Zhou Fei; Hu Chengjun; Fourth official: Tang Shunqi; Video assistant: Lin Jun

19 May 2018 11	Guangzhou R&F	1–1	Henan Jianye	Guangzhou, Guangdong
19:35 UTC+8	Zahavi (penalty missed) 41' (pen.); Xiao Zhi 69'; Xiao Zhi (yellow card) 24' (yellow-red card) 70'; Zhang Gong (yellow card) 83'; Li Tixiang (red card) 90'	Report	Ke Zhao (yellow card) 29'; Cala (yellow card) 57'; Vaz Tê 90+4' (pen.)	Stadium: Yuexiushan Stadium; Attendance: 11,100; Referee: Hei Xiaohu; Assistant referees: Song Xiangyun; Tang Rongdi; Fourth official: Jin Jingyuan; Video assistant: Wang Jing

17 July 2018 12	Tianjin Quanjian	2–1	Guangzhou R&F	Tianjin
19:35 UTC+8	Yang Xu 6'; Su Yuanjie (yellow card) 18'; Pato 24'; Zhao Xuri (red card) 45+2'	Report	Ma Junliang (yellow card) 29'; Eran Zahavi (yellow card) 52'; Zhang Gong (yellow card) 67'; Eran Zahavi 88'	Stadium: Haihe Educational Football Stadium; Attendance: 18,717; Referee: Shen Yinhao; Assistant referees: Shi Xiang; Jiang Bo; Fourth official: Liu Wei; Video assistant: Ma Ning

22 July 2018 13	Guangzhou R&F	1–1	Guizhou Hengfeng	Guangzhou, Guangdong
19:35 UTC+8	Li Tixiang (yellow card) 37'; Tang Miao (yellow card) 51'; Urso 90+2'	Report	Jelavić 39'; Fan Yunlong (yellow card) 50'; Zhang Sipeng (yellow card) 64'	Stadium: Yuexiushan Stadium; Attendance: 10,300; Referee: Ma Li; Assistant referees: Huo Weiming; Zhang Cheng; Fourth official: Xia Jun; Video assistant: Wang Di

28 July 2018 14	Hebei China Fortune	2–2	Guangzhou R&F	Langfang, Hebei
19:35 UTC+8	Dong Xuesheng 45', 52'; Jiang Zhipeng (yellow card) 90+1'	Report	Zahavi 18'; Renatinho 36'; Urso (yellow card) 45'	Stadium: Langfang Stadium; Attendance: 12,193; Referee: Gu Chunhan; Assistant referees: Zhou Fei; Yang Li; Fourth official: Liu Lin; Video assistant: Fu Ming

1 August 2018 15	Guangzhou R&F	4–1	Beijing Renhe	Guangzhou, Guangdong
19:35 UTC+8	Chen Zhizhao (yellow card) 8' (goal) 17'; Li Tixiang (yellow card) 27'; Renatinho 30'; Tang Miao (yellow card) 41'; Zahavi 59'; Jiang Jihong (yellow card) 63'; Lu Lin 89'	Report	Moukandjo 13'; Zhang Yufeng (yellow card) 82'	Stadium: Yuexiushan Stadium; Attendance: 11,356; Referee: Shen Yinhao; Assistant referees: Sun Kai; Shen Pengxiang; Fourth official: Huang Yi; Video assistant: Zhang Long

5 August 2018 16	Guangzhou R&F	2–4	Guangzhou Evergrande Taobao	Guangzhou, Guangdong
19:35 UTC+8	Renatinho 24'; Zahavi (yellow card) 80' (goal) 90+1' (pen.)	Report	Talisca 28'; Mei Fang (yellow card) 37'; Paulinho 48', 88'; Zhang Linpeng (yellow card) 58'; Zheng Zhi (yellow card) 61'; Goulart 65' (yellow card) 68'	Stadium: Yuexiushan Stadium; Attendance: 12,996; Referee: Ma Ning; Assistant referees: Cao Yi; Yu Yue; Fourth official: Xia Jun; Video assistant: Wu Liying

10 August 2018 17	Dalian Yifang	3–0	Guangzhou R&F	Dalian, Liaoning
19:35 UTC+8	Mushekwi 35', 56', 82' (yellow card) 84'; Qin Sheng (yellow card) 55'	Report	Zhang Gong (yellow card) 58'; Lu Lin (yellow card) 70'	Stadium: Dalian Sports Center Stadium; Attendance: 27,998; Referee: Wang Di; Assistant referees: Zhang Cheng; Huang Tao; Fourth official: Tang Shunqi; Video assistant: Li Zheng

15 August 2018 18	Shanghai SIPG	3–1	Guangzhou R&F	Shanghai
18:00 UTC+8	Wu Lei 16', 45+2' (yellow card) 86'; Fu Huan (yellow card) 56'; Lin Chuangyi (yellow card) 63'; Lü Wenjun 65'	Report	Yi Teng (yellow card) 43'; Tang Miao (yellow card) 44'; Xiao Zhi (yellow card) 84'; Zahavi 90+3'	Stadium: Shanghai Stadium; Attendance: 20,113; Referee: Ai Kun; Assistant referees: Xu Xianghui; Wu Huifeng; Fourth official: Kou Jianxun; Video assistant: Lin Jun

18 August 2018 19	Guangzhou R&F	5–2	Changchun Yatai	Guangzhou, Guangdong
19:35 UTC+8	Urso 27'; Tošić 38'; Xiao Zhi 45'; Ding Haifeng (yellow card) 68'; Zahavi 73', 90'	Report	Ighalo 12'; Tan Tiancheng (yellow card) 24'; Tan Long 78'	Stadium: Yuexiushan Stadium; Attendance: 9,847; Referee: Guan Xing; Assistant referees: Liu Jinyu; Xi Fei; Fourth official: Yu Bo; Video assistant: Wang Di

26 August 2018 20	Jiangsu Suning	2–0	Guangzhou R&F	Nanjing, Jiangsu
19:35 (UTC+8)	Tian Yinong (yellow card) 44'; Éder 73' (pen.), (yellow card) 90+1'; Teixeira 90+4'	Report	Li Tixiang (yellow card) 72'	Stadium: Nanjing Olympic Sports Centre; Attendance: 27,361; Referee: Huang Yejun

=== Chinese FA Cup ===
24 April 2018 Fourth round	Wuhan Chufeng Heli	0–2	Guangzhou R&F	Wuhan, Hubei
15:00 UTC+8	Qi Chongxi (yellow card) 42'	Report	Lu Lin 45'; Xiao Zhi 88'	Stadium: Xinhua Road Sports Center; Attendance: 216; Referee: Tang Kun; Assistant referees: Liu Xinyu; Zhang Junwei; Fourth official: Zhu Huajun

2 May 2018 Fifth round	Shenyang Urban	1–2	Guangzhou R&F	Shenyang, Liaoning
15:00 UTC+8	Xu Bo 12'; Liu Jun (yellow card) 33'; Yang Jian (yellow card) 85'	Report	Zhang Jiaqi 45+3'; Lu Lin 59'	Stadium: Shenyang Urban Construction University Stadium; Attendance: 869; Referee: Hei Xiaohu; Assistant referees: Sun Kai; Guo Jingtao; Fourth official: Li Zheng

8 July 2018 Quarter-Finals 1st Leg	Jiangsu Suning	0–0	Guangzhou R&F	Nanjing, Jiangsu
19:00 UTC+8		Report		Stadium: Nanjing Olympic Sports Centre; Referee: Wang Jing; Assistant referees: Cao Yi; Yu Yue; Fourth official: Lin Jun

25 July 2018 Quarter-Finals 2nd Leg	Guangzhou R&F	3–2 (3–2 agg.)	Jiangsu Suning	Guangzhou, Guangdong
20:00 UTC+8	Zhang Chenlong 22'; Li Tixiang (yellow card) 33'; Zahavi 42', 90+7' (pen.)	Report	Ji Xiang 18' (yellow card) 74'; Li Ang (yellow card) 25'; Xie Pengfei 55'; Paletta (red card)	Stadium: Yuexiushan Stadium; Attendance: 9,836; Referee: Shi Zhenlu; Assistant referees: Song Xiangyun; Ma Ji; Fourth official: Guo Baolong

22 August 2018 Semi-Finals 1st Leg	Beijing Sinobo Guoan	5–1	Guangzhou R&F	Beijing
19:35 UTC+8				Stadium: Workers' Stadium

26 September 2018 Semi-Finals 2nd Leg	Guangzhou R&F	–	Beijing Sinobo Guoan	Guangzhou, Guangdong
19:35 UTC+8				Stadium: Yuexiushan Stadium

== Statistics ==
As of 18 August 2018

=== Appearances and goals ===
No.	Pos.	Player	Super League			FA Cup			Total		
No.	Pos.	Player	Apps.	Starts	Goals	Apps.	Starts	Goals	Apps.	Starts	Goals
1	GK	(China) Cheng Yuelei	19	19	0	1	1	0	20	20	0
3	DF	(Serbia) Duško Tošić	4	4	1	2	2	0	6	6	1
4	MF	(China) Zhang Gong	4	1	0	3	2	0	7	3	0
5	DF	(China) Zhang Jiaqi	0	0	0	1	1	1	1	1	1
6	MF	(China) Cai Haojian	3	0	0	1	0	0	4	0	0
7	FW	(Israel) Eran Zahavi	19	19	16	2	2	2	21	21	18
8	MF	(Brazil) Júnior Urso	16	16	3	2	2	0	18	18	3
9	FW	(China) Chang Feiya	9	3	1	2	2	0	11	5	1
10	MF	(Brazil) Renatinho	16	16	6	0	0	0	16	16	6
11	DF	(China) Ding Haifeng	9	6	0	2	0	0	11	6	0
17	DF	(China) Zhang Chenlong	5	5	0	3	3	1	8	8	1
18	DF	(China) Yi Teng	18	18	0	4	4	0	22	22	0
19	DF	(China) Jiang Jihong	13	12	0	2	2	0	15	14	0
20	DF	(China) Tang Miao	18	17	0	2	2	0	20	19	0
23	MF	(China) Lu Lin	16	10	1	3	3	2	19	13	3
24	MF	(China) Mai Jiajian	1	0	0	2	0	0	3	0	0
25	GK	(China) Han Feng	0	0	0	3	3	0	3	3	0
26	FW	(China) Ma Junliang	14	7	1	2	2	0	16	9	1
27	MF	(China) Zhang Jiajie	1	0	0	0	0	0	1	0	0
29	FW	(China) Xiao Zhi	16	14	6	3	3	1	19	17	7
30	MF	(China) Wang Peng	1	0	0	0	0	0	1	0	0
32	MF	(China) Chen Zhizhao	15	12	3	4	4	0	19	16	3
34	DF	(China) Wang Xin	5	0	0	2	0	0	7	0	0
35	DF	(China) Li Tixiang	13	13	0	4	4	0	17	17	0
36	DF	(China) Huang Zhengyu	16	12	0	3	2	0	19	14	0
37	MF	(China) Li Yuyang	3	0	0	0	0	0	3	0	0
38	MF	(China) Chen Yajun	1	0	0	0	0	0	1	0	0
40	DF	(China) Chen Weiming	9	4	0	0	0	0	9	4	0
TOTALS					38			7			45

=== Goalscorers ===
Rank	Player	No.	Pos.	Super League	FA Cup	Total
1	(Israel) Zahavi	7	FW	16	2	18
2	(China) Xiao Zhi	29	FW	6	1	7
3	(Brazil) Renatinho	10	MF	6	0	6
4	(Brazil) Urso	8	MF	3	0	3
4	(China) Lu Lin	23	MF	1	2	3
4	(China) Chen Zhizhao	32	MF	3	0	3
7	(Serbia) Duško Tošić	3	DF	1	0	1
7	(China) Zhang Jiaqi	5	DF	0	1	1
7	(China) Chang Feiya	9	FW	1	0	1
7	(China) Zhang Chenlong	17	DF	0	1	1
7	(China) Ma Junliang	26	MF	1	0	1
TOTALS				38	7	45

=== Disciplinary record ===
No.	Pos.	Player	Super League			FA Cup			Total		
No.	Pos.	Player	Booked	(yellow card) (yellow-red card)	Sent off (straight red)	Booked	(yellow card) (yellow-red card)	Sent off (straight red)	Booked	(yellow card) (yellow-red card)	Sent off (straight red)
1	GK	(China) Cheng Yuelei	2	0	0	0	0	0	2	0	0
4	MF	(China) Zhang Gong	3	0	0	0	0	0	3	0	0
7	FW	(Israel) Zahavi	2	0	0	0	0	0	2	0	0
8	MF	(Brazil) Urso	3	0	0	0	0	0	3	0	0
10	MF	(Brazil) Renatinho	1	0	0	0	0	0	1	0	0
11	DF	(China) Ding Haifeng	2	0	0	0	0	0	2	0	0
17	DF	(China) Zhang Chenlong	1	0	0	0	0	0	1	0	0
18	DF	(China) Yi Teng	2	0	0	0	0	0	2	0	0
19	DF	(China) Jiang Jihong	3	0	0	0	0	0	3	0	0
20	DF	(China) Tang Miao	5	0	0	0	0	0	5	0	0
23	MF	(China) Lu Lin	1	0	0	0	0	0	1	0	0
26	MF	(China) Ma Junliang	1	0	0	0	0	0	1	0	0
29	FW	(China) Xiao Zhi	2	1	0	0	0	0	2	1	0
32	MF	(China) Chen Zhizhao	1	0	0	0	0	0	1	0	0
35	DF	(China) Li Tixiang	3	0	1	1	0	0	4	0	1
36	DF	(China) Huang Zhengyu	1	0	0	0	0	0	1	0	0
TOTALS			32	1	1	1	0	0	33	1	1
