= Chen Weiming =

Chen Weiming may refer to:

- Chen Weiming (scholar) (陳微明, 1881–1958), scholar, taijiquan teacher, and author
- Chen Weiming (sculptor) (陳維明), Chinese-born New Zealand artist and sculptor
- Chen Weiming (footballer) (born 1997), Chinese footballer
