= List of Chinese Super League hat-tricks =

Since the inception of the Chinese Super League, in 2004, 104 players have scored three goals (a hat-trick) or more in a single match. The first player to achieve the feat was Guo Hui, who scored three times for Liaoning in a 5–2 victory over Shanghai Shenhua.

== Hat-tricks ==
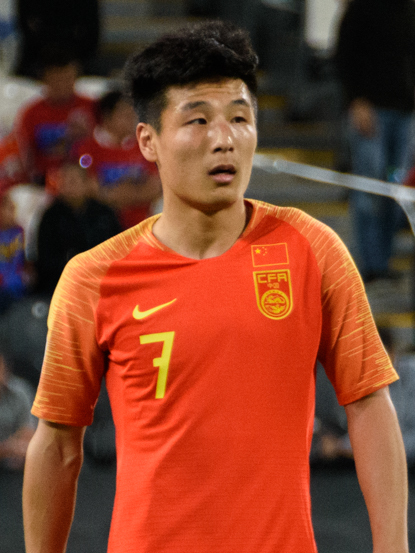
Wu Lei scored nine hat-tricks for Shanghai Port.

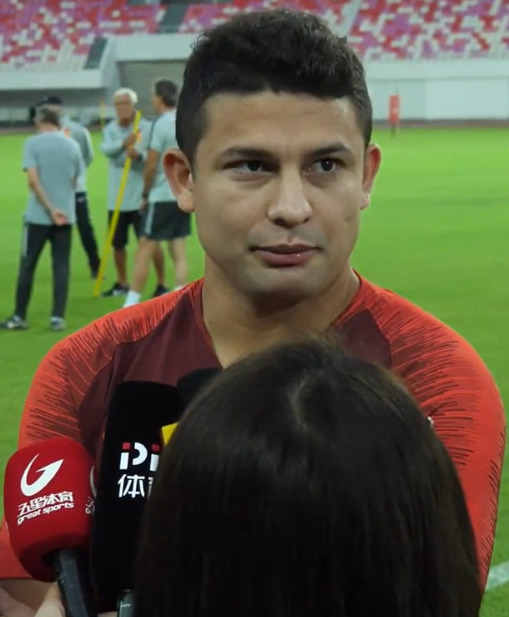
Elkeson scored seven hat-tricks, six for Guangzhou and one for Shanghai Port.

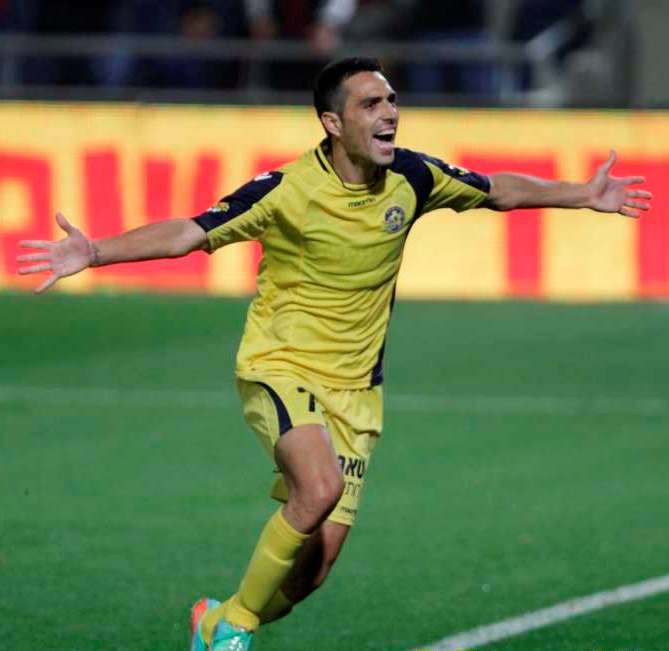
Eran Zahavi scored five hat-tricks for Guangzhou City.

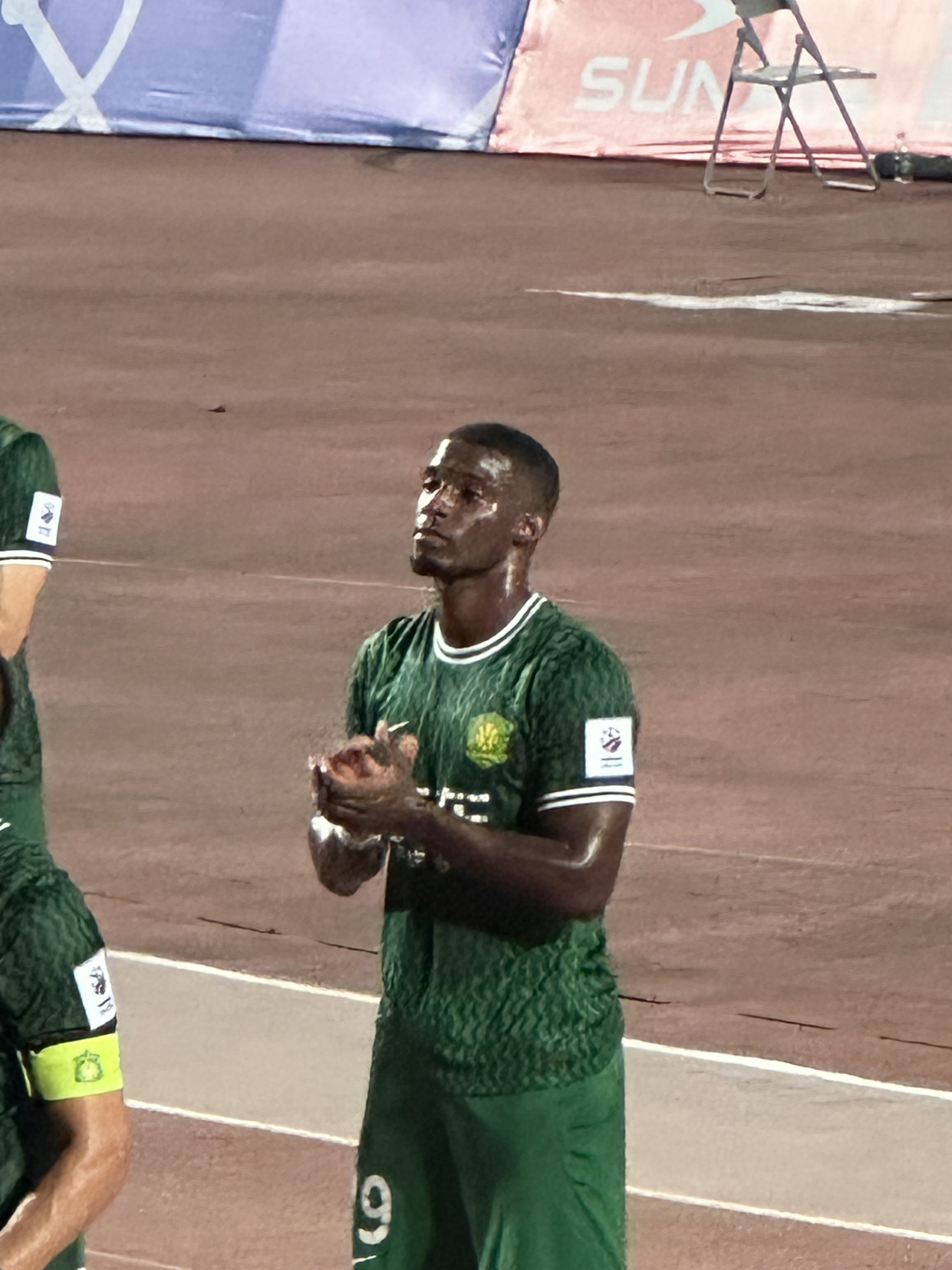
Fábio Abreu scored four hat-tricks for Beijing Guoan.

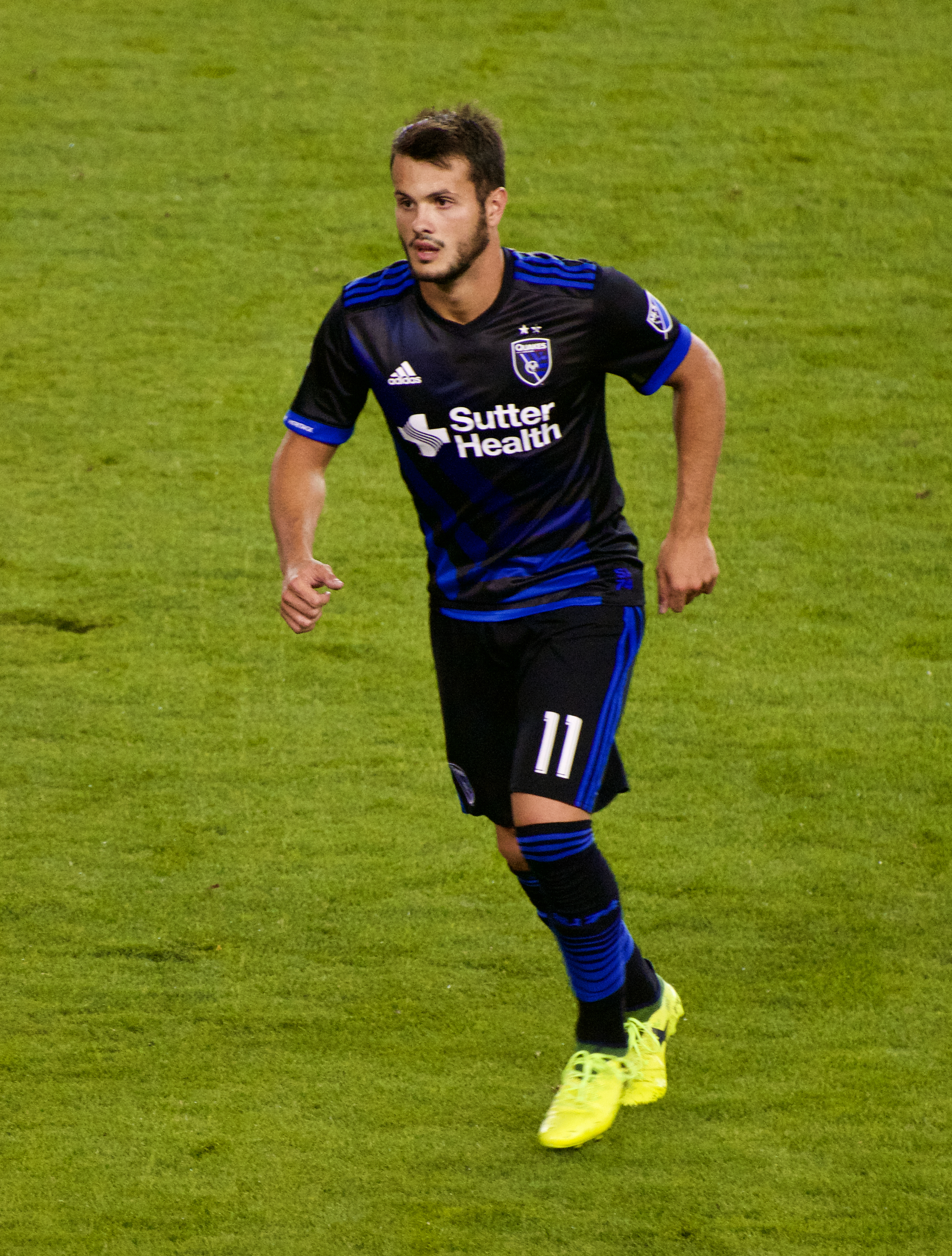
Valeri Qazaishvili scored four hat-tricks for Shandong Taishan.

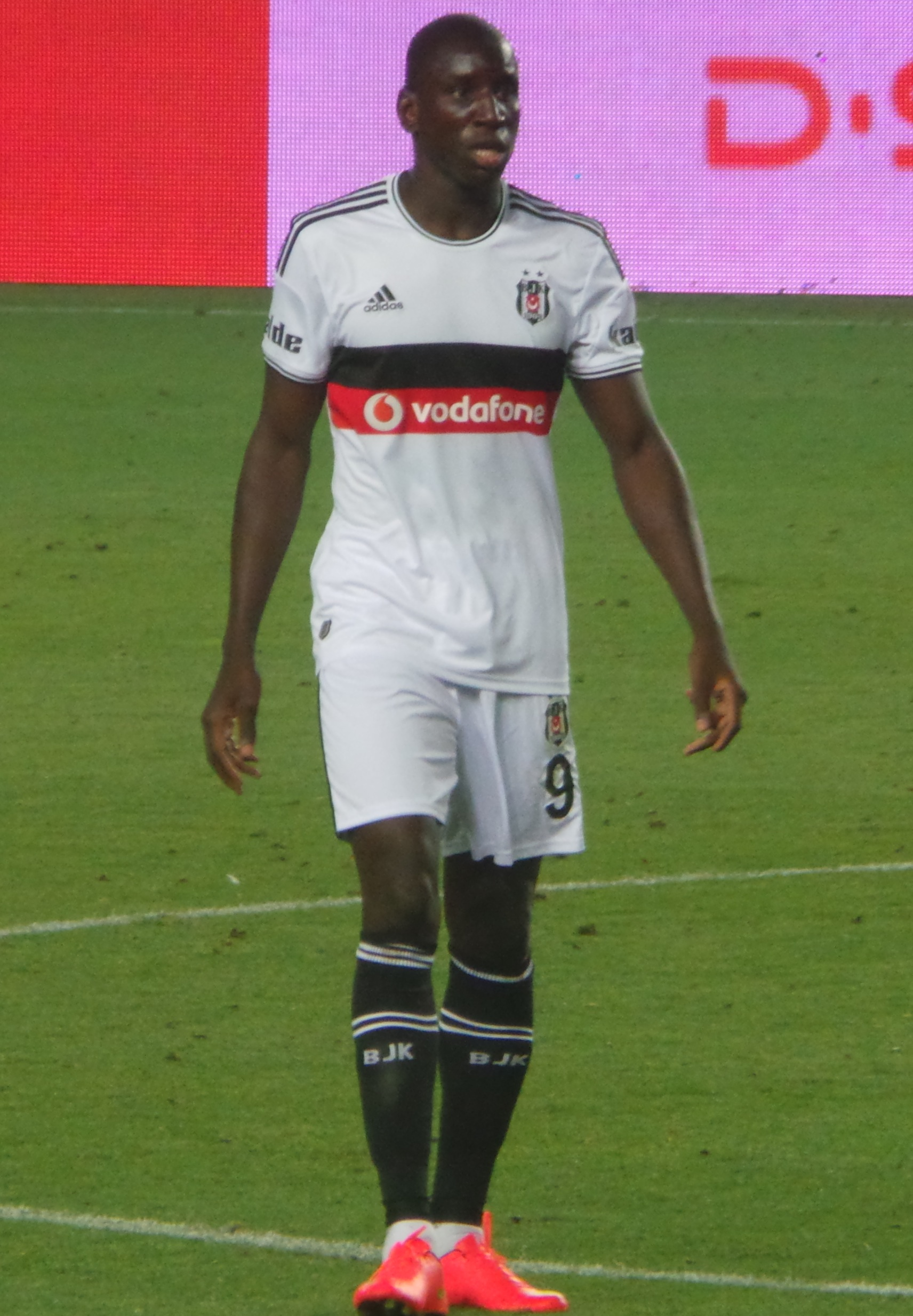
Demba Ba scored three hat-tricks for Shanghai Shenhua.

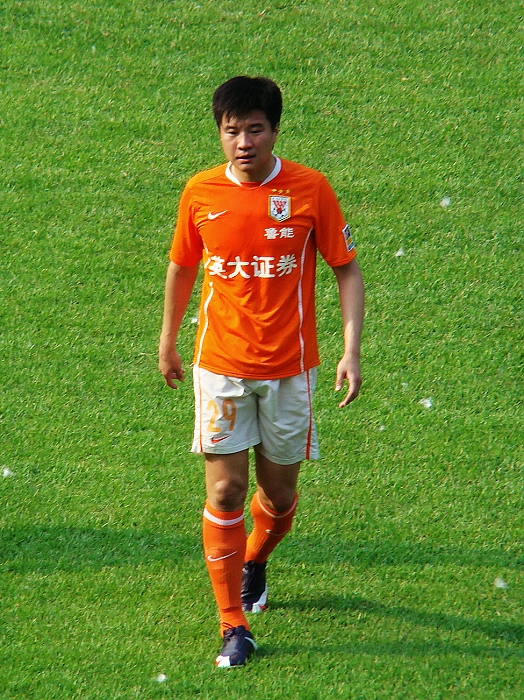
Li Jinyu scored three hat-tricks for Shandong Taishan.

As of 11 October 2026
Note: The results column shows the scorer's team score first. Teams in bold are home teams.

#	Player	Nationality	For	Against	Result	Date	Ref
1	Guo Hui	China	**Liaoning**	Shanghai Shenhua	5–2	20 September 2004	
2	Ermin Šiljak	Slovenia	**Dalian Shide**	Sichuan Guancheng	5–1	17 October 2004	
3	Kwame Ayew ^{4}	Ghana	**Inter Shanghai**	Dalian Shide	4–0	21 October 2004	
4	Tao Wei	China	**Beijing Guoan**	Shanghai Shenhua	3–0	30 October 2004	
5	Zhang Shuo	China	Tianjin TEDA	**Shanghai Shenhua**	4–4	3 November 2004	
6	Sun Ji	China	**Shanghai Shenhua**	Tianjin TEDA	4–4	3 November 2004	
7	Daniel Nannskog	Sweden	**Sichuan Guancheng**	Shenyang Ginde	4–2	28 November 2004	
8	Zoran Janković	Bulgaria	Dalian Shide	**Liaoning**	4–2	10 April 2005	
9	Kwame Ayew	Ghana	Inter Shanghai	**Shenzhen Jianlibao**	3–0	2 July 2005	
10	Zou Jie	China	**Dalian Shide**	Liaoning	5–0	20 July 2005	
11	Branko Jelić	Serbia and Montenegro	**Beijing Guoan**	Sichuan Guancheng	3–1	31 August 2005	
12	Xu Liang	China	**Liaoning**	Shenzhen Jianlibao	5–1	18 September 2005	
13	Jiang Ning	China	Qingdao Jonoon	**Chongqing Lifan**	4–3	29 March 2006	
14	Li Jinyu ^{4}	China	Shandong Luneng Taishan	**Liaoning**	5–0	21 May 2006	
15	Li Jinyu	China	Shandong Luneng Taishan	**Shenyang Ginde**	7–2	29 July 2006	
16	Elvis Scott ^{4}	Honduras	**Changchun Yatai**	Shanghai Shenhua	4–1	27 May 2007	
17	Guillaume Dah Zadi	Ivory Coast	**Changchun Yatai**	Henan Construction	3–1	16 June 2007	
18	Li Jinyu	China	Shandong Luneng Taishan	**Qingdao Jonoon**	4–0	22 August 2007	
19	Wan Houliang	China	**Shaanxi Chanba**	Liaoning	4–1	1 September 2007	
20	Du Zhenyu	China	**Changchun Yatai**	Shenzhen Shangqingyin	4–2	1 November 2008	
21	Éber Luís ^{4}	Brazil	**Tianjin TEDA**	Dalian Shide	5–3	30 November 2008	
22	Xu Liang	China	**Guangzhou Pharmaceutical**	Dalian Shide	3–1	6 April 2009	
23	Qu Bo	China	**Qingdao Jonoon**	Chongqing Lifan	6–1	8 August 2009	
24	Hernán Barcos	Argentina	**Shenzhen Ruby**	Changchun Yatai	4–0	12 September 2009	
25	Ricardo Steer	Colombia	Changchun Yatai	**Hangzhou Greentown**	3–1	24 October 2009	
26	Emil Martínez	Honduras	**Beijing Guoan**	Hangzhou Greentown	4–0	31 October 2009	
27	Netto	Brazil	**Henan Construction**	Changchun Yatai	3–2	7 May 2010	
28	Luis Ramírez	Honduras	Hangzhou Greentown	**Changchun Yatai**	4–3	14 July 2010	
29	Han Peng	China	**Shandong Luneng Taishan**	Changsha Ginde	4–1	24 July 2010	
30	Yang Xu	China	**Liaoning**	Changchun Yatai	5–1	1 August 2010	
31	Duvier Riascos	Colombia	Shanghai Shenhua	**Shenzhen Ruby**	4–0	29 September 2010	
32	Luis Salmerón	Argentina	**Shanghai Shenhua**	Chengdu Blades	4–1	28 May 2011	
33	Dong Xuesheng	China	**Shenzhen Ruby**	Dalian Shide	4–2	21 August 2011	
34	Cristian Dănălache	Romania	**Jiangsu Sainty**	Henan Jianye	5–1	28 April 2012	
35	James Chamanga	Zambia	**Dalian Shide**	Tianjin Teda	4–1	6 May 2012	
36	Rafael Coelho	Brazil	**Guangzhou R&F**	Changchun Yatai	5–1	27 May 2012	
37	Muriqui	Brazil	**Guangzhou Evergrande**	Jiangsu Sainty	5–1	17 June 2012	
38	Peter Utaka	Nigeria	**Dalian Aerbin**	Shandong Luneng Taishan	5–2	21 July 2012	
39	Cristian Dănălache	Romania	**Jiangsu Sainty**	Shandong Luneng Taishan	3–3	5 August 2012	
40	Miloš Trifunović	Serbia	**Liaoning**	Hangzhou Greentown	4–0	23 September 2012	
41	Elkeson	Brazil	**Guangzhou Evergrande**	Jiangsu Sainty	3–0	16 March 2013	
42	Elkeson	Brazil	**Guangzhou Evergrande**	Changchun Yatai	6–1	20 April 2013	
43	Wu Lei	China	Shanghai East Asia	**Shanghai Shenxin**	6–1	2 June 2013	
44	Peter Utaka^{4}	Nigeria	Dalian Aerbin	**Hangzhou Greentown**	4–3	30 June 2013	
45	Muriqui	Brazil	Guangzhou Evergrande	**Shanghai Shenxin**	3–0	6 July 2013	
46	Wu Lei	China	Shanghai East Asia	**Tianjin TEDA**	3–2	17 August 2013	
47	Jiang Ning	China	**Guangzhou R&F**	Wuhan Zall	5–1	18 August 2013	
48	Zhang Xizhe	China	**Beijing Guoan**	Guangzhou R&F	6–0	14 September 2013	
49	Carmelo Valencia	Colombia	Tianjin TEDA	**Jiangsu Sainty**	3–2	14 September 2013	
50	Yakubu	Nigeria	**Guangzhou R&F**	Guizhou Renhe	3–5	22 September 2013	
51	Wu Lei	China	**Shanghai East Asia**	Qingdao Jonoon	6–1	27 September 2013	
52	Abderrazak Hamdallah	Morocco	**Guangzhou R&F**	Shanghai Shenxin	3–1	22 March 2014	
53	Abderrazak Hamdallah	Morocco	**Guangzhou R&F**	Hangzhou Greentown	6–2	30 March 2014	
54	Du Zhenyu	China	**Tianjin TEDA**	Harbin Yiteng	3–0	30 March 2014	
55	James Chamanga	Zambia	**Liaoning**	Harbin Yiteng	3–0	5 April 2014	
56	Vágner Love	Brazil	Shandong Luneng Taishan	**Beijing Guoan**	3–0	19 April 2014	
57	Tobias Hysén	Sweden	**Shanghai East Asia**	Guizhou Renhe	5–2	11 May 2014	
58	Dori	Brazil	**Harbin Yiteng**	Shanghai Greenland	3–3	17 May 2014	
59	Elkeson	Brazil	Guangzhou Evergrande	**Hangzhou Greentown**	4–1	18 May 2014	
60	Elkeson	Brazil	**Guangzhou Evergrande**	Liaoning	6–0	31 August 2014	
61	Dejan Damjanović	Montenegro	Beijing Guoan	**Liaoning**	3–1	28 September 2014	
62	Andrezinho	Brazil	Tianjin TEDA	**Shanghai Greenland**	5–2	26 October 2014	
63	Paulo Henrique	Brazil	**Shanghai Greenland Shenhua**	Shanghai Shenxin	6–2	8 March 2015	
64	Ricardo Goulart	Brazil	**Guangzhou Evergrande Taobao**	Shanghai Shenxin	6–1	10 May 2015	
65	Dejan Damjanović	Montenegro	**Beijing Guoan**	Changchun Yatai	3–1	16 September 2015	
66	Demba Ba	Senegal	**Shanghai Greenland Shenhua**	Jiangsu Guoxin-Sainty	3–1	31 October 2015	
67	Marcelo Moreno	Bolivia	**Changchun Yatai**	Tianjin TEDA	4–4	3 April 2016	
68	Demba Ba	Senegal	**Shanghai Greenland Shenhua**	Shijiazhuang Ever Bright	3–1	3 April 2016	
69	Demba Ba	Senegal	**Shanghai Greenland Shenhua**	Hangzhou Greentown	4–0	19 June 2016	
70	Wu Lei	China	Shanghai SIPG	**Guangzhou R&F**	3–3	31 July 2016	
71	Alex Teixeira	Brazil	Jiangsu Suning	**Shijiazhuang Ever Bright**	6–1	11 September 2016	
72	Eran Zahavi	Israel	**Guangzhou R&F**	Hangzhou Greentown	5–2	16 October 2016	
73	Elkeson	Brazil	**Shanghai SIPG**	Changchun Yatai	5–1	4 March 2017	
74	Ricardo Goulart	Brazil	Guangzhou Evergrande Taobao	**Henan Jianye**	4–2	29 April 2017	
75	Eran Zahavi ^{4}	Israel	**Guangzhou R&F**	Yanbian Funde	6–2	23 July 2017	
76	Bubacarr Trawally	Gambia	Yanbian Funde	**Beijing Sinobo Guoan**	4–4	10 September 2017	
77	Bubacarr Trawally	Gambia	Yanbian Funde	**Guangzhou Evergrande Taobao**	3–4	13 October 2017	
78	Ezequiel Lavezzi	Argentina	Hebei China Fortune	**Shandong Luneng Taishan**	4–5	4 November 2017	
79	Diego Tardelli	Brazil	**Shandong Luneng Taishan**	Hebei China Fortune	5–4	4 November 2017	
80	Alan Carvalho	Brazil	**Guangzhou Evergrande Taobao**	Guangzhou R&F	4–5	2 March 2018	
81	Eran Zahavi	Israel	Guangzhou R&F	**Guangzhou Evergrande Taobao**	5–4	2 March 2018	
82	Oscar	Brazil	**Shanghai SIPG**	Dalian Yifang	8–0	3 March 2018	
83	Wu Lei	China	**Shanghai SIPG**	Dalian Yifang	8–0	3 March 2018	
84	Wu Lei ^{4}	China	Shanghai SIPG	**Guangzhou R&F**	5–2	18 March 2018	
85	Frank Acheampong	Ghana	**Tianjin TEDA**	Tianjin Quanjian	3–2	18 March 2018	
86	Obafemi Martins	Nigeria	**Shanghai Greenland Shenhua**	Hebei China Fortune	4–2	31 March 2018	
87	Odion Ighalo ^{4}	Nigeria	Changchun Yatai	**Guizhou Hengfeng**	5–2	21 April 2018	
88	Bubacarr Trawally	Gambia	Guizhou Hengfeng	**Beijing Sinobo Guoan**	3–4	29 April 2018	
89	Talisca	Brazil	**Guangzhou Evergrande Taobao**	Guizhou Hengfeng	4–0	18 July 2018	
90	Alan Kardec	Brazil	**Chongqing Dangdai Lifan**	Guizhou Hengfeng	3–4	1 August 2018	
91	Jonathan Soriano	Spain	**Beijing Sinobo Guoan**	Hebei China Fortune	6–3	2 August 2018	
92	Nyasha Mushekwi	Zimbabwe	**Dalian Yifang**	Guangzhou R&F	3–0	10 August 2018	
93	Renato Augusto	Brazil	Beijing Sinobo Guoan	**Tianjin TEDA**	5–2	25 August 2018	
94	Dong Xuesheng	China	Hebei China Fortune	**Chongqing Dangdai Lifan**	4–4	20 October 2018	
95	Alexandre Pato	Brazil	Tianjin Quanjian	**Guangzhou R&F**	6–2	27 October 2018	
96	Eran Zahavi	Israel	**Guangzhou R&F**	Shenzhen	3–1	26 April 2019	
97	Jonathan Viera	Spain	**Beijing Sinobo Guoan**	Dalian Yifang	4–1	28 April 2019	
98	Graziano Pellè	Italy	**Shandong Luneng Taishan**	Wuhan Zall	3–0	28 April 2019	
99	Eran Zahavi	Israel	**Guangzhou R&F**	Wuhan Zall	3–4	15 June 2019	
100	Paulinho	Brazil	**Guangzhou Evergrande Taobao**	Dalian Yifang	4–1	16 July 2019	
101	Elkeson	Brazil	Guangzhou Evergrande Taobao	**Guangzhou R&F**	5–0	20 July 2019	
102	Kim Shin-wook	South Korea	**Shanghai Greenland Shenhua**	Guangzhou R&F	5–3	27 July 2019	
103	Alan Kardec ^{4}	Brazil	Chongqing Dangdai Lifan	**Beijing Renhe**	4–1	13 October 2019	
104	Marko Arnautović ^{4}	Austria	**Shanghai SIPG**	Shenzhen	6–0	1 December 2019	
105	Marouane Fellaini	Belgium	Shandong Luneng Taishan	**Dalian Pro**	3–2	26 July 2020	
106	Ivan Santini	Croatia	**Jiangsu Suning**	Henan Jianye	5–2	30 August 2020	
107	Cédric Bakambu ^{4}	DR Congo	**Beijing Sinobo Guoan**	Chongqing Dangdai Lifan	5–2	1 September 2020	
108	Adrian Mierzejewski	Poland	Chongqing Dangdai Lifan	**Shijiazhuang Ever Bright**	4–1	25 September 2020	
109	Marko Arnautović	Austria	Shanghai Port	**Tianjin Jinmen Tiger**	6–1	22 April 2021	
110	Ricardo Goulart	China	**Guangzhou**	Cangzhou Mighty Lions	5–2	2 August 2021	
111	Elkeson	China	**Guangzhou**	Qingdao	5–0	11 August 2021	
112	Tan Long	China	**Changchun Yatai**	Guangzhou City	4–1	4 June 2022	
113	Marcão	Brazil	**Wuhan Three Towns**	Shanghai Shenhua	4–2	3 July 2022	
114	Marcão ^{4}	Brazil	**Wuhan Three Towns**	Beijing Guoan	5–1	12 August 2022	
115	Felicio Brown Forbes	Costa Rica	Wuhan Yangtze River	**Guangzhou City**	5–0	13 August 2022	
116	Júnior Negrão	Brazil	Changchun Yatai	**Hebei**	7–1	19 August 2022	
117	José Kanté^{4}	Guinea	Cangzhou Mighty Lions	**Wuhan Three Towns**	4–3	24 September 2022	
118	Zang Yifeng	China	Cangzhou Mighty Lions	**Hebei**	5–0	4 October 2022	
119	Wu Lei	China	**Shanghai Port**	Meizhou Hakka	7–0	24 October 2022	
120	Rômulo	Brazil	**Chengdu Rongcheng**	Hebei	6–0	3 November 2022	
121	José Kanté	Guinea	Cangzhou Mighty Lions	**Shandong Taishan**	3–2	30 November 2022	
122	Chisom Egbuchulam	Nigeria	Meizhou Hakka	**Hebei**	4–0	5 December 2022	
123	Cryzan ^{4}	Brazil	**Shandong Taishan**	Shenzhen	8–0	19 December 2022	
124	Leonardo	Brazil	Changchun Yatai	**Cangzhou Mighty Lions**	4–2	19 May 2023	
125	Tao Qianglong	China	Wuhan Three Towns	**Nantong Zhiyun**	5–0	23 May 2023	
126	Abdul-Aziz Yakubu	Ghana	Wuhan Three Towns	**Shenzhen**	3–1	3 July 2023	
127	Wang Ziming	China	**Beijing Guoan**	Shenzhen	5–0	8 July 2023	
128	Felicio Brown Forbes	Costa Rica	**Qingdao Hainiu**	Shenzhen	5–0	12 July 2023	
129	Felipe	Brazil	**Chengdu Rongcheng**	Dalian Pro	4–1	22 July 2023	
130	Hu Jinghang	China	**Shandong Taishan**	Henan	5–1	4 November 2023	
131	Felipe	Brazil	**Chengdu Rongcheng**	Shenzhen Peng City	3–1	20 April 2024	
132	Cryzan	Brazil	**Shandong Taishan**	Nantong Zhiyun	3–1	30 April 2024	
133	Matías Vargas	Argentina	Shanghai Port	**Shenzhen Peng City**	6–0	5 May 2024	
134	Andrea Compagno	Italy	Tianjin Jinmen Tiger	**Cangzhou Mighty Lions**	4–2	17 May 2024	
135	Oscar	Brazil	**Shanghai Port**	Cangzhou Mighty Lions	4–1	26 May 2024	
136	Wu Lei	China	**Shanghai Port**	Zhejiang	3–1	29 June 2024	
137	Cephas Malele	Switzerland	**Shanghai Shenhua**	Shandong Taishan	6–0	6 July 2024	
138	Gustavo	Brazil	**Shanghai Port**	Qingdao Hainiu	5–0	21 July 2024	
139	Martin Boakye	Italy	Qingdao Hainiu	**Zhejiang**	3–4	3 August 2024	
140	Manuel Palacios	Colombia	**Chengdu Rongcheng**	Changchun Yatai	4–0	3 August 2024	
141	Wu Lei^{4}	China	**Shanghai Port**	Meizhou Hakka	7–2	9 August 2024	
142	Fábio Abreu	Angola	**Beijing Guoan**	Changchun Yatai	8–1	28 September 2024	
143	Cryzan	Brazil	Shandong Taishan	**Qingdao West Coast**	5–1	15 April 2025	
144	Valeri Qazaishvili	Georgia	**Shandong Taishan**	Zhejiang	4–2	10 May 2025	
145	Fábio Abreu	Angola	Beijing Guoan	**Meizhou Hakka**	4–0	25 June 2025	
146	Wesley	Brazil	**Shenzhen Peng City**	Qingdao Hainiu	4–0	19 July 2025	
147	Valeri Qazaishvili	Georgia	**Shandong Taishan**	Meizhou Hakka	3–0	27 July 2025	
148	Valeri Qazaishvili^{4}	Georgia	**Shandong Taishan**	Beijing Guoan	6–0	31 August 2025	
149	Valeri Qazaishvili	Georgia	Shandong Taishan	**Shanghai Shenhua**	3–3	12 September 2025	
150	Leonardo	Brazil	Shanghai Port	**Beijing Guoan**	3–2	21 September 2025	
151	Fábio Abreu	Angola	**Beijing Guoan**	Dalian Yingbo	4–2	26 September 2025	
152	Elvis Sarić	Bosnia and Herzegovina	Qingdao Hainiu	**Beijing Guoan**	4–2	26 October 2025	
153	Fábio Abreu^{4}	Angola	**Beijing Guoan**	Meizhou Hakka	5–1	22 November 2025	
154	Felipe	Brazil	**Chengdu Rongcheng**	Qingdao West Coast	5–1	3 April 2026	
155	Cryzan	Brazil	**Shandong Taishan**	Shanghai Shenhua	4–1	5 May 2026	
156	Guy Mbenza	Congo	Liaoning Tieren	**Zhejiang**	5–0	24 May 2026	
157	Wesley	Brazil	**Shenzhen Peng City**	Qingdao Hainiu	3–2	30 May 2026	
158	Luís Asué	Equatorial Guinea	Shanghai Shenhua	**Chengdu Rongcheng**	5–4	22 August 2026	
159	Gustavo	Brazil	Henan	**Liaoning Tieren**	4–4	23 August 2026	
160	Alexandru Mitriță	Romania	**Zhejiang**	Yunnan Yukun	6–0	29 August 2026	
161	Rafael Ratão	Brazil	**Shanghai Shenhua**	Yunnan Yukun	7–1	10 October 2026	
162	Frank Acheampong^{4}	Ghana	Dalian Yingbo	**Qingdao West Coast**	4–0	11 October 2026	

- ^{4} Player scored 4 goals

== Multiple hat-tricks ==
As of 11 October 2026

The following table lists the minimum number of hat-tricks scored by players who have scored two or more hat-tricks.

Players in bold are still active in the Chinese Super League.

Rank	Player	Hat-tricks	Last hat-trick
1	(China) **Wu Lei**	9	9 August 2024
2	(Brazil) → (China) Elkeson	7	11 August 2021
3	(Israel) Eran Zahavi	5	15 June 2019
4	(Angola) **Fábio Abreu**	4	22 November 2025
4	(Brazil) **Cryzan**	4	5 May 2026
4	(Georgia (country)) **Valeri Qazaishvili**	4	12 September 2025
7	(Senegal) Demba Ba	3	19 June 2016
7	(Brazil) **Felipe**	3	3 April 2026
7	(Brazil) Ricardo Goulart	3	2 August 2021
7	(China) Li Jinyu	3	22 August 2007
7	(The Gambia) Bubacarr Trawally	3	29 April 2018
12	(Ghana) **Frank Acheampong**	2	11 October 2026
12	(Brazil) Alan Kardec	2	13 October 2019
12	(Austria) Marko Arnautović	2	22 April 2021
12	(Ghana) Kwame Ayew	2	2 July 2005
12	(Costa Rica) Felicio Brown Forbes	2	12 July 2023
12	(Zambia) James Chamanga	2	5 April 2014
12	(Montenegro) Dejan Damjanović	2	16 September 2015
12	(China) Dong Xuesheng	2	20 October 2018
12	(China) Du Zhenyu	2	30 March 2014
12	(Romania) Cristian Dănălache	2	5 August 2012
12	(Brazil) **Gustavo**	2	23 August 2026
12	(Morocco) Abderrazak Hamdallah	2	30 March 2014
12	(China) Jiang Ning	2	18 August 2013
12	(Guinea) José Kanté	2	30 November 2022
12	(Brazil) **Leonardo**	2	21 September 2025
12	(Brazil) Marcão	2	12 August 2022
12	(Brazil) Muriqui	2	6 July 2013
12	(Brazil) Oscar	2	26 May 2024
12	(Nigeria) Peter Utaka	2	30 June 2013
12	(Brazil) **Wesley**	2	30 May 2026
12	(China) Xu Liang	2	6 April 2009

== Hat-tricks by nationality ==
As of 11 October 2026

The following table lists the number of hat-tricks scored by players from a single nation.

Rank	Nation	Hat-tricks	Last hat-trick
1	Brazil	46	10 October 2026
2	China	37	9 August 2024
3	Nigeria	6	5 December 2022
4	Ghana	5	11 October 2026
4	Israel	5	15 June 2019
6	Angola	4	22 November 2025
6	Argentina	4	5 May 2024
6	Colombia	4	3 August 2024
6	Georgia	4	12 September 2025
10	Gambia	3	29 April 2018
10	Honduras	3	14 July 2010
10	Italy	3	3 August 2024
10	Romania	3	29 August 2026
10	Senegal	3	19 June 2016
15	Austria	2	22 April 2021
15	Costa Rica	2	12 July 2023
15	Guinea	2	30 November 2022
15	Montenegro	2	16 September 2015
15	Morocco	2	30 March 2014
15	Spain	2	28 April 2019
15	Serbia	2	23 September 2012
15	Sweden	2	11 May 2014
15	Zambia	2	5 April 2014
24	Belgium	1	26 July 2020
24	Bolivia	1	3 April 2016
24	Bosnia and Herzegovina	1	26 October 2025
24	Bulgaria	1	10 April 2005
24	Congo	1	24 May 2026
24	Croatia	1	30 August 2020
24	DR Congo	1	1 September 2020
24	Equatorial Guinea	1	22 August 2026
24	Ivory Coast	1	16 June 2007
24	Poland	1	25 September 2020
24	Slovenia	1	17 October 2004
24	South Korea	1	27 July 2019
24	Switzerland	1	6 July 2024
24	Zimbabwe	1	10 August 2018

== Hat-tricks by clubs ==
As of 11 October 2026

The following table lists the rank of hat-tricks scored by clubs.

Clubs in bold are still active in the Chinese Super League.

Clubs in italic are defunct.

Rank	Club	Hat-tricks	Last hat-trick
1	**Shanghai Port**	18	21 September 2025
2	**Shandong Taishan**	17	5 May 2026
3	**Beijing Guoan**	15	22 November 2025
3	Guangzhou	15	11 August 2021
5	**Shanghai Shenhua**	12	10 October 2026
6	Guangzhou City	10	15 June 2019
7	Changchun Yatai	9	19 May 2023
8	**Tianjin Jinmen Tiger**	7	17 May 2024
9	**Chengdu Rongcheng**	5	3 April 2026
9	Liaoning	5	5 April 2014
9	**Qingdao Hainiu**	5	26 October 2025
12	Dalian Shide	4	6 May 2012
12	Jiangsu	4	30 August 2020
12	**Wuhan Three Towns**	4	3 July 2023
15	Beijing Chengfeng	3	1 September 2007
15	Cangzhou Mighty Lions	3	30 November 2022
15	Chongqing Liangjiang Athletic	3	25 September 2020
15	Dalian Pro	3	10 August 2018
19	Hebei	2	20 October 2018
19	**Henan**	2	23 August 2026
19	Shenzhen	2	21 August 2011
19	**Shenzhen Peng City**	2	30 May 2026
19	Yanbian Funde	2	13 October 2017
19	**Zhejiang**	2	29 August 2026
25	**Dalian Yingbo**	1	11 October 2026
25	Guizhou	1	29 April 2018
25	**Liaoning Tieren**	1	24 May 2026
25	Meizhou Hakka	1	5 December 2022
25	Shaoxing Keqiao Yuejia	1	17 May 2014
25	Sichuan First City	1	28 November 2004
25	Tianjin Tianhai	1	27 October 2018
25	Wuhan Yangtze River	1	13 August 2022
