= Júnior Urso =

Brazilian footballer

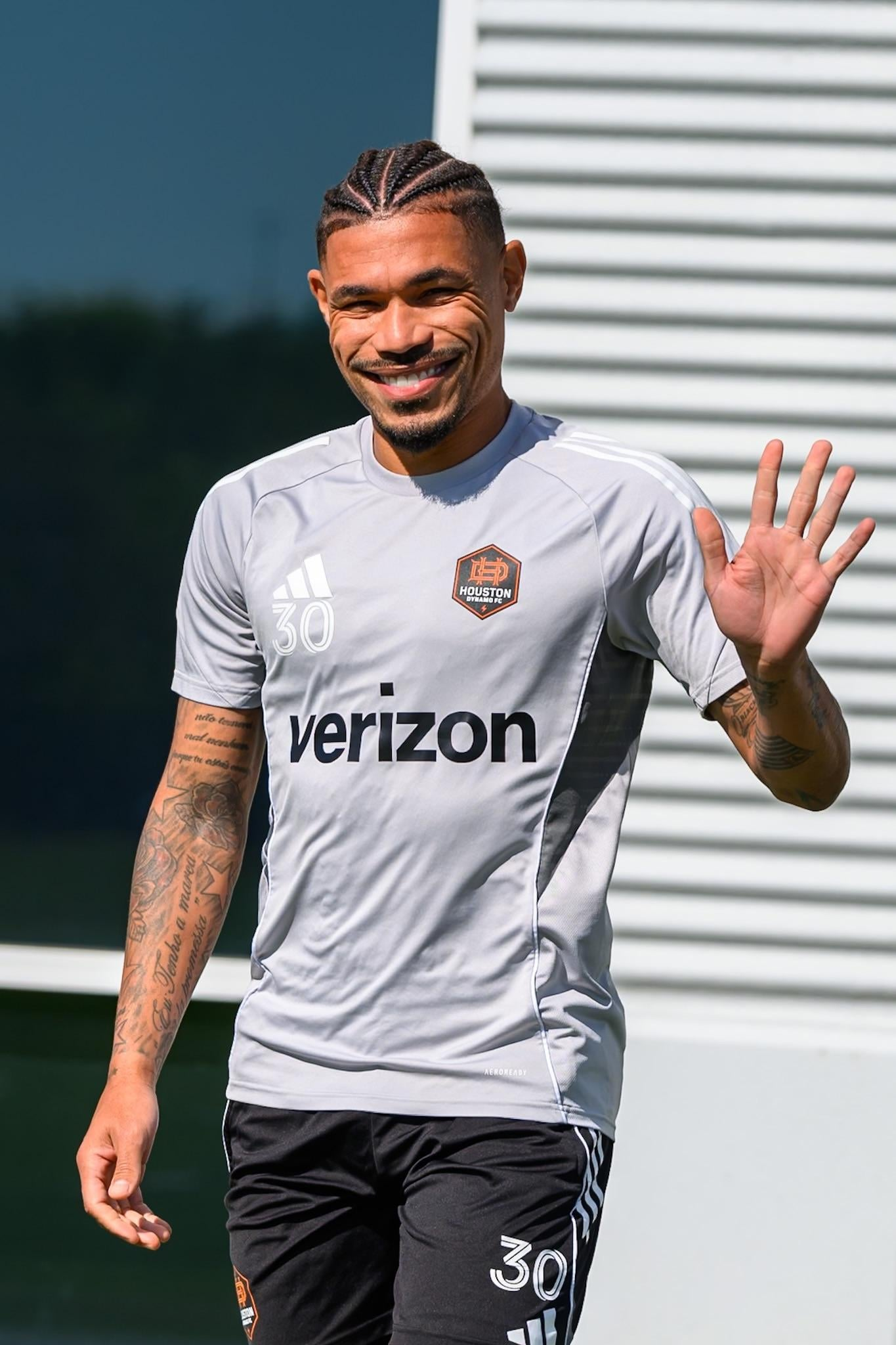
- Urso with Houston Dynamo in 2025

Personal information
- Full name: Ocimar de Almeida Júnior
- Date of birth: 10 March 1989 (age 37)
- Place of birth: Taboão da Serra, Brazil
- Height: 1.81 m (5 ft 11 in)
- Position: Defensive midfielder

Senior career*
Years	Team	Apps	(Gls)
2009–2010	Santo André	0	(0)
2009	→ Palestra (loan)	28	(2)
2010–2011	Ituano	0	(0)
2011–2012	Avaí	11	(0)
2011	→ Paraná (loan)	16	(0)
2012	→ Coritiba (loan)	24	(1)
2013	Coritiba	23	(1)
2014–2016	Shandong Luneng	58	(12)
2016	→ Atlético Mineiro (loan)	23	(4)
2017–2019	Guangzhou R&F	42	(6)
2019	Corinthians	27	(3)
2020–2022	Orlando City	87	(12)
2023	Coritiba	7	(0)
2023	Orlando City	9	(0)
2024	Charlotte FC	21	(1)
2025	Houston Dynamo	19	(1)
2026	São Bernardo	6	(0)
- * Club domestic league appearances and goals as of 20 July 2026

Ocimar de Almeida Júnior or simply Júnior Urso (born 10 March 1989) is a Brazilian professional footballer who plays as a defensive midfielder.

== Career ==
=== Brazil ===
Júnior started his career in Santo André. In 2010, he transferred to Ituano. After a good performance in early 2011, he had his federative rights purchased to Avaí and was loaned to Paraná Clube immediately. In the middle of 2011 season, Avaí called back Junior Urso to play in the Série A. He made his debut for Avaí in the game which Avaí loses to Grêmio in Ressacada. In the end of 2011, he was hired with Coritiba.

=== Shandong Luneng ===
In February 2014, Urso moved to Chinese Super League giants Shandong Luneng and proceeded to score the first goal of the season against Harbin Yiteng.

==== Loan to Atlético Mineiro ====
Following contract disputes with Shandong Luneng, the Chinese club loaned Urso back to Brazil where he played the 2016 season with Atlético Mineiro. The loan fee was a reported US$2 million (R$7.2 million).

=== Guangzhou R&F ===
On 9 January 2017, Júnior moved to fellow Super League side Guangzhou R&F.

=== Corinthians ===
On 4 February 2019, Júnior Urso returned to Brazil, signing with Corinthians after Guangzhou terminated his contract. He made his debut for the team on 17 February against São Paulo FC in the 2019 Campeonato Paulista, a competition Corinthians would go on to win. Three days later he scored his first goal for the club in a 4–2 win over Avenida in the Copa do Brasil.

=== Orlando City ===
On 6 January 2020, Corinthians confirmed the sale of Urso to MLS team Orlando City ahead of the 2020 season, reportedly for a fee of $900k. Orlando announced his arrival the following week. Urso made his debut for the team in the season opener, captaining the side in place of the suspended Nani as Orlando earned a 0–0 draw against Real Salt Lake. On 29 August 2020, Urso scored the opener in a 3–1 win over Atlanta United, Orlando's first ever win in the rivalry's history. On 10 November 2022, Orlando City and Urso mutually agreed to terminate his contract, allowing Urso to return to Brazil for personal reasons. In three seasons, he made a total of 100 appearances in all competitions and scored 14 goals.

In July 2023, Urso rejoined Orlando City. In December 2023, as part of the end of season roster moves, it was announced Urso had his option declined and was released as a free agent.

=== Charlotte FC ===
On 21 February 2024, Urso signed with Charlotte FC ahead of their 2024 season. Charlotte declined his contract option following their 2024 season.

=== Houston Dynamo ===
Urso signed with Houston Dynamo 11 February 2025. Houston declined his contract option following the 2025 season.

== Personal life ==
Urso's brother is former professional footballer Peter de Almeida who retired in 2015 to become Junior's agent.

== Career statistics ==
As of 25 November 2023

Appearances and goals by club, season and competition
Club	Season	League			National cup		Continental		Playoffs		Other		Total	
Club	Season	Division	Apps	Goals	Apps	Goal	Apps	Goals	Apps	Goals	Apps	Goals	Apps	Goals
Santo André	2010	Campeonato Paulista	0	0	0	0	—		—		2	0	2	0
Ituano	2011	Campeonato Paulista	0	0	0	0	—		—		19	0	19	0
Avaí	2011	Série A	11	0	0	0	—		—		0	0	11	0
Paraná (loan)	2011	Série B	16	0	0	0	—		—		0	0	16	0
Coritiba	2012	Série A	24	1	9	0	2	0	—		16	2	51	3
Coritiba	2013	Série A	23	1	3	0	2	0	—		11	0	39	1
Coritiba	Total		47	2	12	0	4	0	0	0	27	2	90	4
Shandong Luneng	2014	Chinese Super League	30	4	0	0	—		—		—		30	4
Shandong Luneng	2015	Chinese Super League	28	9	1	0	5	2	—		—		34	11
Shandong Luneng	Total		58	13	1	0	5	2	0	0	0	0	64	15
Atlético Mineiro (loan)	2016	Série A	23	4	7	0	8	1	—		10	2	48	7
Guangzhou R&F	2017	Chinese Super League	18	2	3	0	—		—		—		21	2
Guangzhou R&F	2018	Chinese Super League	24	4	1	0	—		—		—		25	4
Guangzhou R&F	Total		42	6	4	0	0	0	0	0	0	0	46	6
Corinthians	2019	Série A	27	3	7	0	8	1	—		10	1	48	5
Orlando City	2020	MLS	23	3	—		—		2	1	2 (Note: MLS is Back Tournament knockout stage)	0	27	4
Orlando City	2021	MLS	30	4	—		—		1	0	1 (Note: Leagues Cup)	0	32	4
Orlando City	2022	MLS	34	5	6	1	—		1	0	—		41	6
Orlando City	Total		87	12	6	1	0	0	4	1	3	0	100	14
Coritiba	2023	Série A	6	0	1	0	—		—		1	0	8	0
Orlando City	2023	MLS	9	0	0	0	0	0	3	0	0	0	12	0
Career total			326	40	38	1	25	4	7	1	72	5	468	51

== Honours ==
Coritiba

- Campeonato Paranaense: 2012, 2013

Shandong Luneng

- Chinese FA Cup: 2014
- Chinese FA Super Cup: 2015

Corinthians

- Campeonato Paulista: 2019

Orlando City

- U.S. Open Cup: 2022

Individual

- Campeonato Mineiro Team of the Tournament: 2016
- Campeonato Paulista Team of the Tournament: 2019
