= Eran Zahavi =

Israeli footballer (born 1987)

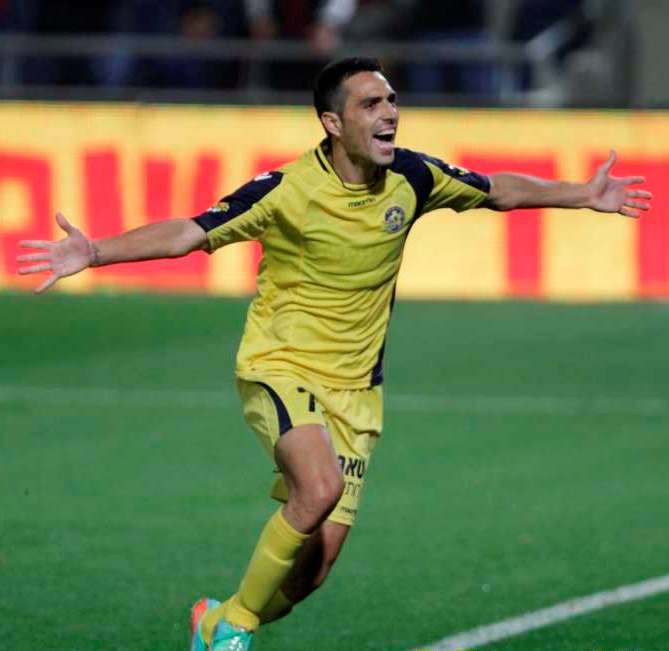
- Zahavi celebrating a goal for Maccabi Tel Aviv in 2014

Personal information
- Date of birth: 25 July 1987 (age 39)
- Place of birth: Rishon LeZion, Israel
- Height: 1.81 m (5 ft 11 in)
- Position: Forward

Youth career
- 1993–2003: Hapoel Tel Aviv
- 2003–2005: Ironi Rishon LeZion
- 2005–2006: Hapoel Tel Aviv

Senior career*
Years	Team	Apps	(Gls)
2006–2011	Hapoel Tel Aviv	94	(27)
2007–2008	→ Ironi Ramat HaSharon (loan)	45	(9)
2011–2013	Palermo	23	(2)
2013–2016	Maccabi Tel Aviv	119	(98)
2016–2020	Guangzhou R&F	106	(91)
2020–2022	PSV Eindhoven	50	(22)
2022–2025	Maccabi Tel Aviv	100	(52)
Total		537	(301)

International career
2008	Israel U21	1	(0)
2010–2024	Israel	74	(35)
- * Club domestic league appearances and goals

Eran Zahavi (/ɛˈrɑːn zəˈhɑːvɪ/ err-AHN zə-HAH-vi, also spelled Eran Zehavi, Hebrew: ערן זהבי; born 25 July 1987) is an Israeli former professional footballer who played as a forward.

While playing for Maccabi Tel Aviv, Zahavi was named Israeli Footballer of the Year twice (2013–14 and 2014–15), and finished as the top scorer of the Israeli Premier League for three consecutive seasons, in 2013–14 (29 goals), 2014–15 (27 goals) and 2015–16 (35 goals, all-time league record). In December 2014, Zahavi broke the Israeli Premier League record for scoring in consecutive appearances after he scored for the 18th game in a row. In 2016, he broke the Israeli league six-decade-old season scoring record, dating back to 1954–55. After joining Guangzhou R&F in 2016, he was named the 2017 Chinese Super League MVP, and broke the league's single-season scoring record in 2019 (29 goals).

Zahavi made his debut for the Israel national team in 2010, and went on to captain the side. With 35 goals, he is currently the nation's all-time top scorer.

== Club career ==
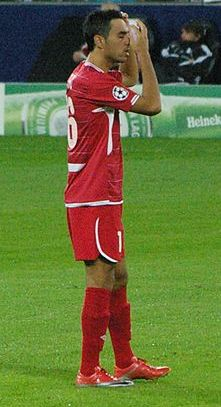
Zahavi playing for Hapoel Tel Aviv in 2010

Zahavi started his youth career with Hapoel Tel Aviv at the age of 6. At the age of 16 he went to Ironi Rishon LeZion, in his hometown. Two years later, in 2005, he returned to Hapoel.

=== Hapoel Tel Aviv ===
A Hapoel Tel Aviv youth product, Zahavi was promoted to its senior team in 2006. With Hapoel, he won the 2009–10 Israel State Cup and the 2009–10 Israeli Premier League title after a dramatic match against the fierce rivals Beitar Jerusalem in the last round of the season, in which he scored the winning goal in the 92nd minute. Zahavi was reported to have garnered interest from clubs in Belgium during the 2009–10 season.

In the 2010–11 season Zahavi became the top assist provider of the Israeli Premier League, providing 13 assists during the season.

=== Palermo ===
Zahavi signed a five-year deal with the Italian Serie A club, Palermo, before the beginning of the 2011–12 Serie A season. He capped two seasons with 23 appearances in the top league in Italy, scoring two goals against Bologna and Cagliari.

=== Maccabi Tel Aviv ===
In December 2012, towards the winter transfers window opening, Zahavi showed signs of returning to Israel. Following an agreement made by Palermo and Maccabi Tel Aviv, his former club Hapoel Tel Aviv was given seven days to make a bid on him due to a first-option clause in his contract, but it was not exploited. On 21 January 2013, after over a month of speculation in the media, Maccabi Tel Aviv announced his arrival, signing him on a three-and-a-half-year contract for €250,000.

At the Tel Aviv derby on 3 November 2014, Zahavi scored a penalty to equalise the score at 1–1 in the first half but was then attacked by a pitch invader. On retaliating, he was sent off, prompting more pitch invasions which led to the match being abandoned.

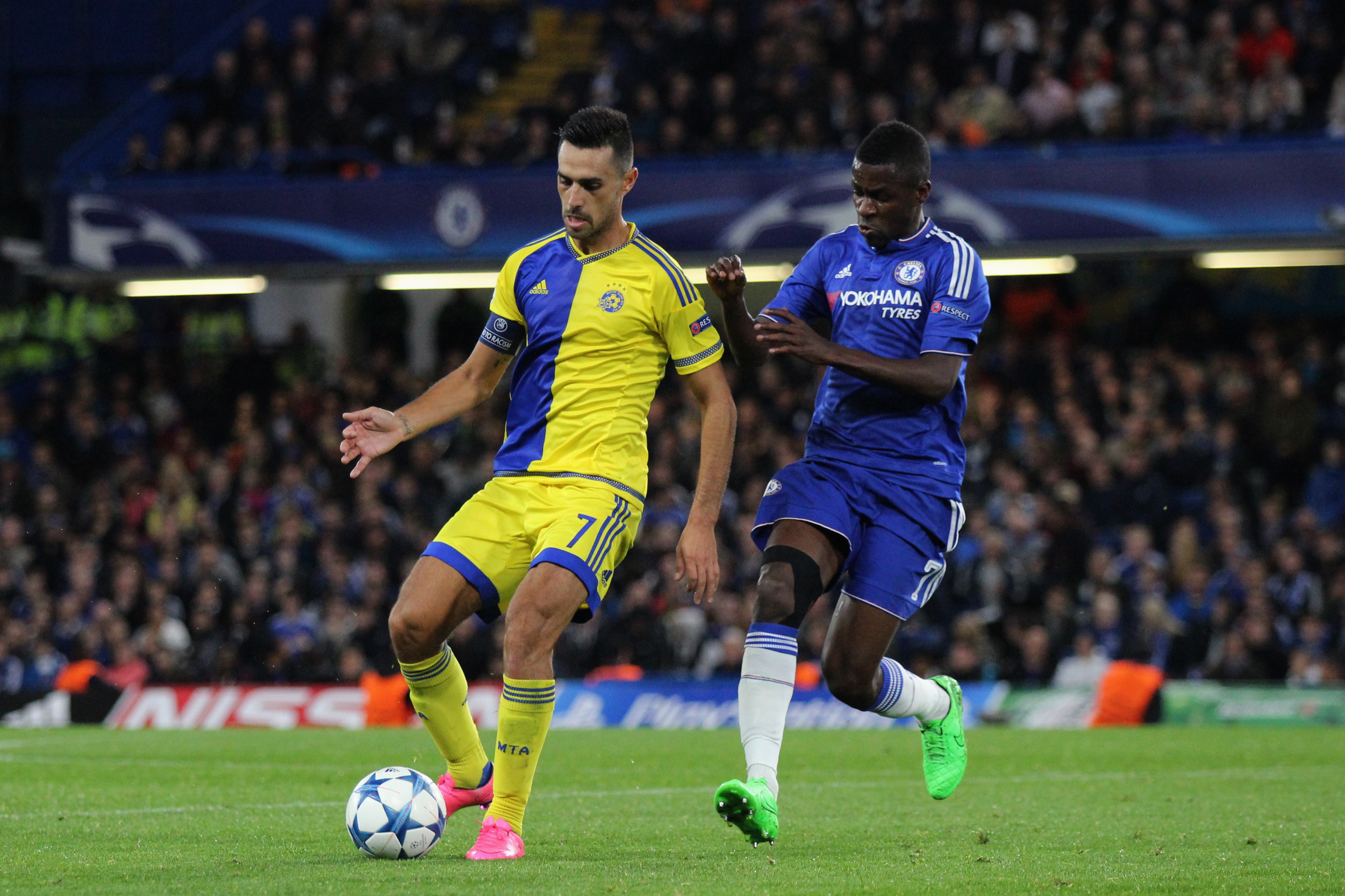
Zahavi (left) playing for and captains Maccabi Tel Aviv in the 2015–16 Champions League match against Chelsea.

In the beginning of the 2015–16 season, Zahavi was appointed as Maccabi Tel Aviv's new captain after former captain Sheran Yeini signed with Dutch club Vitesse. On 5 August 2015, Zahavi scored two goals against Czech team Viktoria Plzeň in a 2–0 away victory in the second leg of the third qualifying round after Maccabi lost at home 2–1. On 19 August 2015, Zahavi scored a brace, including a 96th-minute equaliser, in a 2–2 draw against Swiss side Basel at St. Jakob-Park in the first leg of the Champions League playoffs. On 25 August, during the second leg at Bloomfield, he scored a 24th-minute equaliser as the match ended 1–1, a result that sent Maccabi to the Champions League group stage due to the away goals rule. Zahavi finished the Champions League qualifying phase and play-off round as the top goalscorer with 7 goals in 5 games. During the season Zahavi scored 35 league goals, in 36 league games, and set a new Israeli record for league goals in single season. The previous record was set by the striker Nissim Elmaliach, who scored 30 goals in 26 league games during the 1954–55 season.

=== Guangzhou R&F ===
On 29 June 2016, Zahavi joined Guangzhou R&F of the Chinese Super League, making him the second Israeli footballer in China after Liron Zarko. The transfer deal paid Zahavi a reported $12.5 million over two-and-a-half years. On 2 July, Zahavi made his debut coming on from the bench at the 60th minute playing against Shijiazhuang Ever Bright with the score a 1–1 draw. 15 minutes later he scored his first goal, and later on he added an assist to lead his team to a 4–2 victory.

On 13 July, Zahavi scored a hat-trick in 19 minutes in the Chinese FA Cup match against Hebei China Fortune, coming on from the bench in the second half and helping R&F to a 3–0 win. On 18 October, during a league match against Hangzhou Greentown, Zahavi netted his second hat-trick in an R&F jersey, propelling them to a 5–2 victory. He found the net in the 33rd, 55th, and 67th minutes of the match. Those goals gave him 16 goals in as many games for R&F, across all competitions. These scoring exploits quickly earned him the nickname "the King of Yuexiushan".

Zahavi finished his first half season for Guangzhou R&F with six goals in four Chinese FA Cup games, and 11 league goals in 15 appearances. In December 2016, according to media reports, Chinese club Shandong Luneng Taishan F.C. offered US$20 million for Zahavi, the highest transfer fee ever offered for an Israeli footballer. On 24 January 2017, Zahavi signed a renewed contract with Guangzhou R&F until the end of the 2020 season, for an estimated $7 million per season. On 23 July, in the league match against Yanbian Funde, he scored four goals for Guangzhou in a 6–2 victory. Zahavi finished the 2017 season with 27 league goals (one short of the league record) to win the CSL Golden Boot Award. He was also named the Most Valuable Player in the Chinese Super League, and selected in the CSL team of the year.

After Shanghai Greenland Shenhua failed to sign Zahavi in September 2017 for a transfer fee of $25 million, Zahavi renewed his contract with Guangzhou R&F in February 2018 for an estimated $10 million per season on a three-year contract. On 2 March, during round 1 of the 2018 CSL season, Zahavi scored a hat-trick and assisted one goal in the 5–4 away win against reigning champions Guangzhou Evergrande Taobao.

In November 2019, Zahavi broke the CSL single-season scoring record after scoring his 29th goal of the season, surpassing the previous record set by Elkeson in 2014.

=== PSV Eindhoven ===
On 20 September 2020, Zahavi signed a two-year deal with Eredivisie side PSV Eindhoven. He made his debut for the Dutch side on 1 October 2020 in UEFA Europa League play-offs against Norwegian side Rosenborg, contributing to the 2–0 away win with a goal and an assist.

On 21 July 2021, Zahavi scored a hat-trick and made an assist in a 5–1 win against Galatasaray, in the first leg of the UEFA Champions League second qualifying round match.

In March 2022, Zahavi was named by the UEFA Europa Conference League as its Player of the Week, thanks to his two-goal display against Danish side Copenhagen in the round of 16 second leg, earning his side a 4–0 away win. In the same month, he was also named as Eredivisie Player of the Month after scoring in each of the three games he played in March. Zahavi scored his eighth European goal of the season in the Conference League quarter-finals against Leicester City, and thus equalised the PSV record shared by Willy van der Kuijlen and Gerrie Deijkers, who both scored eight European goals for the club in the 1970s.

Zahavi left the club after the 2021–22 season after his contract was not renewed.

=== Return to Maccabi Tel Aviv and retirement ===
In June 2022, Zahavi returned to Maccabi Tel Aviv on a two-year contract, having previously played for the Israeli Premier League side between 2013 and 2016. He was also named captain of the club.

In December 2023, UEFA named Zahavi as the UEFA Europa Conference League Player of the Week after scoring a brace against Belgian side Gent in the group stage, securing Maccabi Tel Aviv a 3–1 victory.

In January 2026, Zahavi announced his retirement from professional football at the age of 38.

== International career ==
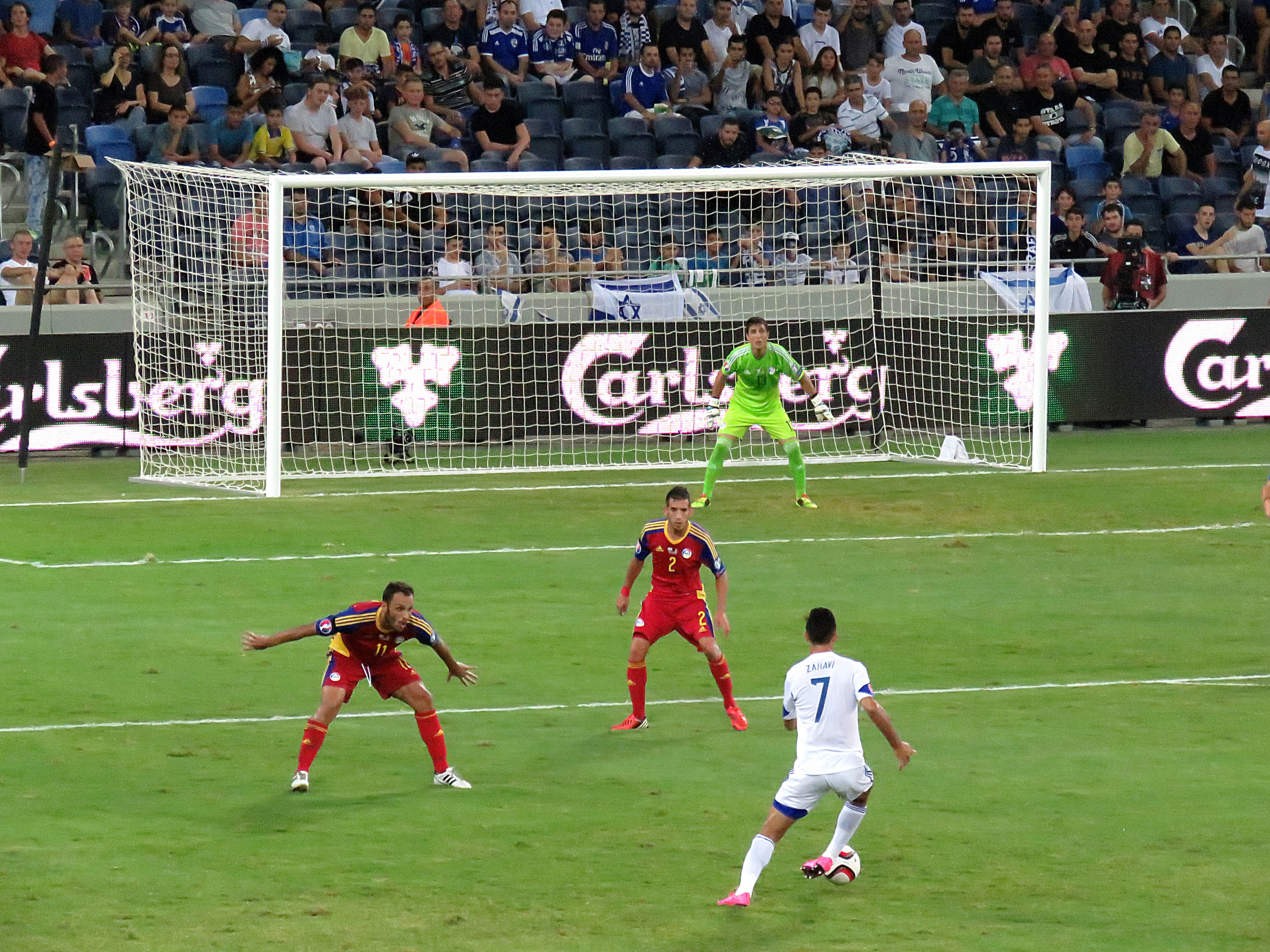
Zahavi (in white) playing for Israel in 2016 Euro qualifiers against Andorra

Zahavi made his senior debut for Israel on 2 September 2010 against Malta in UEFA Euro 2012 qualifiers. He scored his first goal for the national team on 10 September 2013 against Russia in the 2014 FIFA World Cup qualifiers.

On 24 March 2019, he scored a hat-trick against Austria in a 4–2 home win, during the UEFA Euro 2020 qualifiers. On 7 June 2019, Zahavi scored a back-to-back hat-trick against Latvia in a 3–0 away win, during the UEFA Euro 2020 qualifiers. He scored a total of eleven goals during the qualifying campaign, and was thus the second best overall goalscorer (along with Cristiano Ronaldo) across all qualifying groups, and only a goal behind Harry Kane.

On 14 October 2020, during a 2020–21 UEFA Nations League B match against Slovakia, Zahavi scored three goals in the span of 20 minutes to bring Israel from 0–2 behind to a 3–2 win. With five goals, he was the second best goalscorer across all divisions of the 2020–21 UEFA Nations League (along with League A's Romelu Lukaku), and only a goal behind League B's Erling Haaland.

On 1 September 2021, Zahavi scored his fourth international hat-trick in an away match of the 2022 FIFA World Cup qualifiers, earning Israel a 4–0 win against Faroe Islands. Three days later, he scored two goals in the World Cup qualifying match against Austria, that ended in a 5–2 home win for Israel. Even though he missed the last two matches due to injury, Zahavi managed to score a total of eight goals during the qualifiers, and was thus one of the top goalscorers across all qualifying rounds.

On 15 September 2022, it was announced that Zahavi went on hiatus from the Israel national team due to hotel room dispute prior to an international duty break. However, in November 2023, he returned to the team for the remainder of the UEFA Euro 2024 qualifying matches.

== Personal life ==
Zahavi was born and raised in Rishon LeZion, Israel, to Israeli-Jewish parents. His father Ilan immigrated from France to Israel as a teenager, whereas his mother Eti is Israeli-born. He has an elder brother, Avi.

Zahavi has served in the Israel Defense Forces (IDF), to complete his mandatory military service. He also obtained a French passport, on account of his French-born father, in order to facilitate the transfer to certain European leagues. Zahavi is observant and does not play football on the Jewish High Holiday of Yom Kippur.

On 9 May 2021, ahead of the Eredivisie match between his club PSV Eindhoven and Willem II, two armed robbers broke into Zahavi's house in Amsterdam, tying up his wife Shay (née Levy) and three children. On 12 December 2021, their house was broken into again, this time when Zahavi was on health resort abroad with his family.

== Career statistics ==
=== Club ===
Appearances and goals by club, season and competition
Club	Season	League			National cup (Note: Includes Israel State Cup, Coppa Italia, Chinese FA Cup, KNVB Cup)		League cup (Note: Includes Toto Cup)		Continental		Other		Total	
Club	Season	Division	Apps	Goals	Apps	Goals	Apps	Goals	Apps	Goals	Apps	Goals	Apps	Goals
Hapoel Tel Aviv	2006–07	Israeli Premier League	0	0	0	0	2	0	—		—		2	0
Hapoel Tel Aviv	2008–09	Israeli Premier League	28	7	1	0	7	4	6 (Note: Appearances in UEFA Cup)	1	—		42	12
Hapoel Tel Aviv	2009–10	Israeli Premier League	33	11	5	1	6	1	11 (Note: Appearances in UEFA Europa League)	0	—		55	13
Hapoel Tel Aviv	2010–11	Israeli Premier League	33	9	4	2	1	1	12 (Note: Appearances in UEFA Champions League)	5	—		50	17
Hapoel Tel Aviv	Total		94	27	10	3	16	6	29	6	—		149	42
Ironi Ramat HaSharon (loan)	2006–07	Liga Leumit	17	2	1	0	—		—		—		18	2
Ironi Ramat HaSharon (loan)	2007–08	Liga Leumit	28	7	2	1	2	2	—		—		32	10
Ironi Ramat HaSharon (loan)	Total		45	9	3	1	2	2	—		—		50	12
Palermo	2011–12	Serie A	20	2	0	0	—		2	0	—		22	2
Palermo	2012–13	Serie A	3	0	1	0	—		—		—		4	0
Palermo	Total		23	2	1	0	—		2	0	—		26	2
Maccabi Tel Aviv	2012–13	Israeli Premier League	16	7	2	1	—		0	0	—		18	8
Maccabi Tel Aviv	2013–14	Israeli Premier League	34	29	1	1	—		11 (Note: Four appearances and two goals in UEFA Champions League, seven appearances and three goals in UEFA Europa League)	5	—		46	35
Maccabi Tel Aviv	2014–15	Israeli Premier League	33	27	5	5	4	1	6 (Note: Four appearances and one goal in UEFA Champions League, two appearances and one goal in UEFA Europa League)	2	—		48	35
Maccabi Tel Aviv	2015–16	Israeli Premier League	36	35	6	3	2	1	11	8	1 (Note: Appearances in Israel Super Cup)	2	56	49
Maccabi Tel Aviv	Total		119	98	14	10	6	2	28	15	1	2	168	127
Guangzhou R&F	2016	Chinese Super League	15	11	4	6	—		—		—		19	17
Guangzhou R&F	2017	Chinese Super League	30	27	4	4	—		—		—		34	31
Guangzhou R&F	2018	Chinese Super League	26	20	3	2	—		—		—		29	22
Guangzhou R&F	2019	Chinese Super League	28	29	0	0	—		—		—		28	29
Guangzhou R&F	2020	Chinese Super League	7	4	0	0	—		—		—		7	4
Guangzhou R&F	Total		106	91	11	12	—		—		—		117	103
PSV Eindhoven	2020–21	Eredivisie	25	11	2	0	—		6	6	—		33	17
PSV Eindhoven	2021–22	Eredivisie	25	11	4	1	—		16 (Note: Six appearances and three goals in UEFA Champions League, four appearances and one goal in UEFA Europa League, six appearances and four goals in UEFA Europa Conference League)	8	1 (Note: Appearance in Johan Cruyff Shield)	0	46	20
PSV Eindhoven	Total		50	22	6	1	—		22	14	1	0	79	37
Maccabi Tel Aviv	2022–23	Israeli Premier League	32	20	4	4	1	0	4 (Note: Appearances in UEFA Europa Conference League)	2	—		41	26
Maccabi Tel Aviv	2023–24	Israeli Premier League	35	20	3	3	3	3	14	13	—		55	39
Maccabi Tel Aviv	2024–25	Israeli Premier League	33	12	2	1	1	1	7 (Note: Two appearances in UEFA Champions League, five appearances in UEFA Europa League)	0	1	1	44	15
Maccabi Tel Aviv	Total		100	52	9	8	5	4	25	15	1	1	140	80
Career total			537	301	54	35	29	14	106	50	3	3	729	403

=== International ===
Appearances and goals by national team and year
National team	Year	Apps	Goals
Israel	2010	3	0
Israel	2011	5	0
Israel	2012	3	0
Israel	2013	6	1
Israel	2014	6	2
Israel	2015	7	1
Israel	2016	5	2
Israel	2017	4	0
Israel	2018	3	2
Israel	2019	10	11
Israel	2020	7	5
Israel	2021	11	9
Israel	2022	0	0
Israel	2023	3	1
Israel	2024	1	1
Total		74	35

== Honours ==
Hapoel Tel Aviv

- Israeli Premier League: 2009–10
- Israel State Cup: 2009–10, 2010–11

Maccabi Tel Aviv

- Israeli Premier League: 2012–13, 2013–14, 2014–15, 2023–24, 2024–25
- Israel State Cup: 2014–15
- Toto Cup: 2014–15, 2023–24, 2024–25
- Israel Super Cup: 2024

PSV Eindhoven

- KNVB Cup: 2021–22
- Johan Cruyff Shield: 2021

Individual

- Israeli Premier League Most Assists: 2010–11
- Israeli Footballer of the Year: 2013–14, 2014–15
- Israeli Premier League Top scorer: 2013–14, 2014–15, 2015–16
- Chinese Super League Player of the Year: 2017
- Chinese Super League Top scorer: 2017, 2019
- Chinese Super League Team of the Year: 2017, 2019
- Eredivisie Player of the Month: March 2022

== See also ==
- List of top international men's football goal scorers by country
- List of Chinese Super League hat-tricks
- List of Jewish footballers
- List of Jews in sports
- List of Israelis
- List of Israel international footballers
