= Bubacarr Trawally =

Gambian footballer (born 1994)

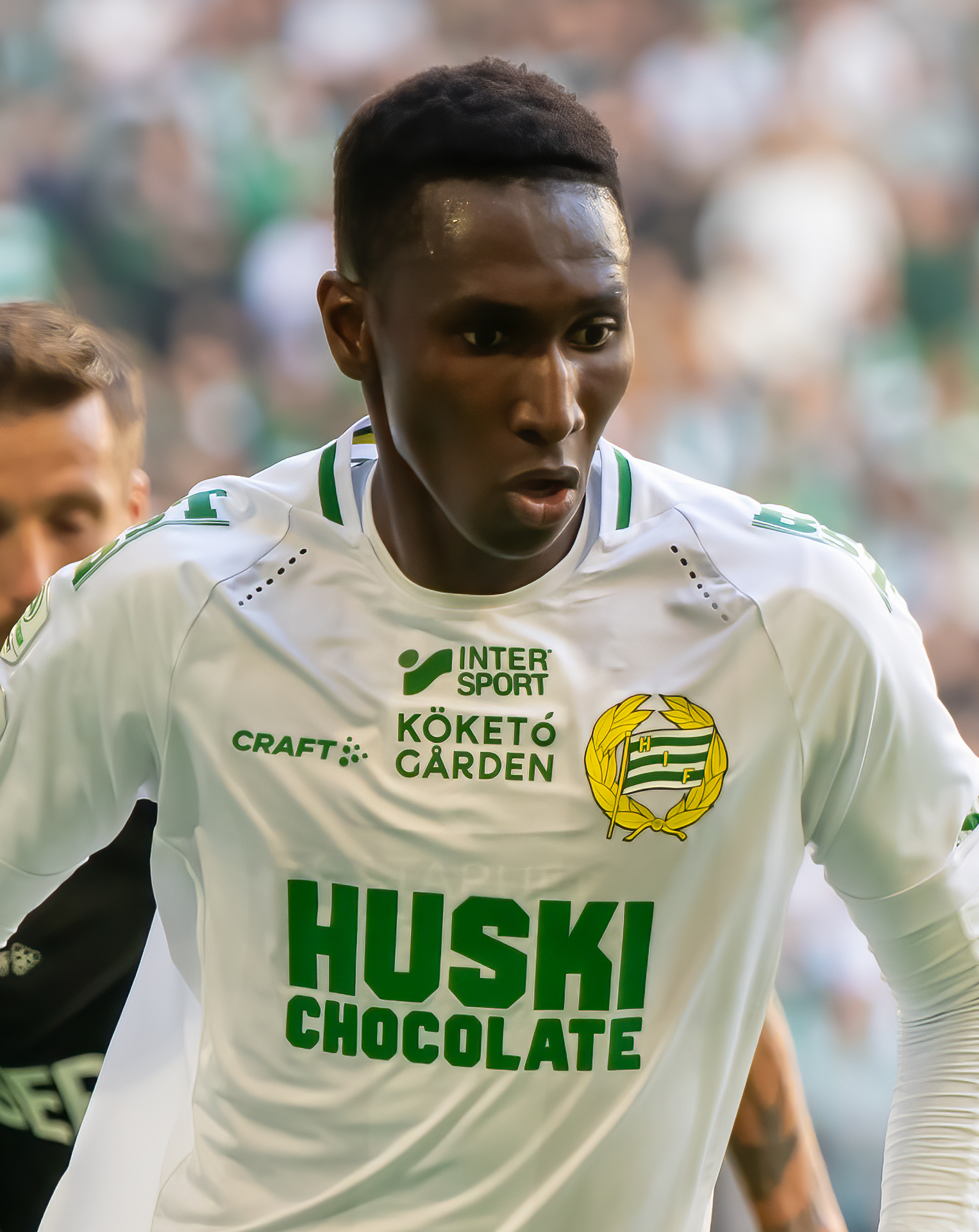
- Trawally with Hammarby in 2022

Personal information
- Full name: Steve Bubacarr Trawally
- Date of birth: 10 November 1994 (age 32)
- Place of birth: Serekunda, Gambia
- Height: 1.88 m (6 ft 2 in)
- Position: Forward

Senior career*
Years	Team	Apps	(Gls)
2010–2014	Real de Banjul		
2015	Hangzhou Greentown	0	(0)
2015	→ Yanbian Changbaishan (loan)	26	(17)
2016–2017	Yanbian Funde	54	(26)
2018–2019	Vejle Boldklub	0	(0)
2018	→ Guizhou Hengfeng (loan)	29	(11)
2019–2021	Al-Shabab	11	(3)
2019–2021	→ Ajman (loan)	40	(14)
2021–2022	Ajman	17	(6)
2022–2023	Hammarby IF	12	(2)
2024	Sanat Naft	11	(1)
2024–2025	Al Urooba	12	(1)
2025	Paide Linnameeskond	9	(3)

International career^{‡}
	Gambia U20	1	(0)
2015–2022	Gambia	16	(1)
- * Club domestic league appearances and goals as of 22 March 2026 ‡ National team caps and goals as of 13 September 2025

Steve Bubacarr Trawally (born 10 November 1994) is a Gambian professional footballer who plays as a forward.

== Club career ==
On 12 January 2015, Trawally transferred to Chinese Super League side Hangzhou Greentown. He was then loaned to China League One side Yanbian Changbaishan until the end of the season. On 14 March 2015, Trawally made his debut for Yanbian in the first round of the season against Jiangxi Liansheng. He scored his first goal in China in the 52nd minute, which ensured Yanbian's 1–0 victory. On 23 May 2015, he was sent off by waving the finger towards opponent in a league match against Tianjin Songjiang, which resulted in a ban of 4 matches and him being fined ¥20,000. Trawally scored his first hat-trick in China on 18 July 2015, in a 4–2 win against Guizhou Hengfeng Zhicheng. He scored another hat-trick on 8 August 2015, in a 6–1 victory against Xinjiang Tianshan Leopard. Trawally scored 17 goals in 26 appearances in the 2015 season, as Yanbian Changbaishan won the title of the league and promoted to the first tier.

Trawally made a permanent transfer to Yanbian Fude on 13 February 2016. On 11 March 2016, he made his Super League debut in the second match of 2016 season against Jiangsu Suning, coming on as a substitute for Nikola Petković in the 88th minute. Trawally scored eight goals in 26 appearances in the 2016 season which secured Yanbian's stay in the top flight for the next season. He extended his contract for another two years in February 2017. Trawally continued his promising performances in the 2017 season, scoring 18 goals for the club, including two hat-tricks against Beijing Sinobo Guoan and Guangzhou Evergrande Taobao.

Trawally left for another top-tier club Guizhou Hengfeng on free via Danish club Vejle Boldklub following Yanbian's relegation in the 2017 season. On 9 February 2018, Yanbian made an official statement that Trawally was under contract with the club and disapproved his transfer. The disagreement eventually solved on 28 February 2018, the final day of 2018 Chinese football transfer winter window, after Guizhou Hengfeng paid his transfer fee. Trawally made his debut and scored his first goal for the club on 4 March 2018 in a 3–1 loss against Jiangsu Suning.

In February 2019, he moved to Saudi club Al-Shabab. He was loaned to Emirati side Ajman Club in September the same year.

On 31 March 2022, Trawally transferred to Hammarby IF in the Swedish Allsvenskan, signing a two-year contract. Due to an injury, he missed the first eight fixtures of the league campaign, making his competitive debut for the side on 22 May in a 3–0 home win against IFK Norrköping. A few days later, Trawally featured in the final of the 2021–22 Svenska Cupen, in which Hammarby lost by 4–5 on penalties to Malmö FF after the game ended in a 0–0 draw. In total, Trawally scored twice in nine Allsvenskan appearances throughout the 2022 season, before suffering a knee injury in late September that ruled him out for the rest of the year. He spent the majority of the 2023 season nursing his injury, before making a comeback in early October, ending the campaign on just three Allsvenskan appearances. On 12 November 2023, it was announced that Trawally would leave the club at the end of the year following the expiration of his contract.

== International career ==
On 6 September 2015, Trawally made his debut for Gambia in a 2017 Africa Cup of Nations qualification match against Cameroon coming on as a substitute for Pa Amat Dibba in the 64th minute.

== Career statistics ==
=== Club ===
As of match played 1 June 2024

Club	Season	League			National Cup		League Cup		Continental		Total	
Club	Season	Division	Apps	Goals	Apps	Goals	Apps	Goals	Apps	Goals	Apps	Goals
Yanbian Changbaishan (loan)	2015	China League One	26	17	0	0	–		–		26	17
Yanbian Funde	2016	Chinese Super League	26	8	0	0	–		–		26	8
Yanbian Funde	2017	Chinese Super League	28	18	0	0	–		–		28	18
Yanbian Funde	Total		54	26	0	0	–		–		54	26
Guizhou Hengfeng (loan)	2018	Chinese Super League	29	11	2	0	–		–		31	11
Al Shabab	2018–19	Saudi Pro League	11	3	0	0	–		–		11	3
Al Shabab	2019–20	Saudi Pro League	0	0	–		–		–		0	0
Al Shabab	Total		11	3	0	0	–		–		11	3
Ajman (loan)	2019–20	UAE Pro League	15	7	1	0	1	0	–		17	7
Ajman (loan)	2020–21	UAE Pro League	24	7	2	0	1	0	–		27	7
Ajman (loan)	Total		39	14	3	0	2	0	–		44	14
Ajman	2021–22	UAE Pro League	17	6	1	0	3	1	–		21	7
Hammarby	2022	Allsvenskan	9	2	2	0	–		–		11	2
Hammarby	2023	Allsvenskan	3	0	0	0	0	0	–		3	0
Hammarby	Total		12	2	2	0	0	0	–		14	2
Sanat Naft	2023–24	Persian Gulf Pro League	11	1	–		–		–		11	1
Career total			199	80	8	0	5	1	0	0	212	81

=== International ===
National team	Year	Apps	Goals
Gambia	2015	2	0
Gambia	2016	1	0
Gambia	2017	2	0
Gambia	2019	2	0
Gambia	2020	2	0
Gambia	2021	5	0
Gambia	2022	2	1
Total		16	1

Statistics accurate as of match played 10 April 2022

== Honours ==
Real de Banjul

- Gambian Championnat National D1: 2012, 2014
- Gambian Super Cup: 2012

Yanbian Changbaishan

- China League One: 2015

Individual

- Gambian Championnat National D1 top scorer: 2014
