= Ma Junliang =

Chinese footballer (born 1998)

Ma Junliang 马俊亮
Personal information
- Full name: Ma Junliang
- Date of birth: 2 March 1998 (age 28)
- Place of birth: Guangzhou, Guangdong, China
- Height: 1.81 m (5 ft 11 in)
- Position: Midfielder

Team information
- Current team: Shijiazhuang Gongfu
- Number: 26

Youth career
- Guangzhou R&F

Senior career*
| Years | Team | Apps | (Gls) |
| 2017–2019 | Guangzhou R&F | 26 | (1) |
| 2021–2022 | Shaanxi Chang'an Athletic | 58 | (10) |
| 2023 | Nanjing City | 5 | (0) |
| 2023 | → Dongguan United (loan) | 15 | (0) |
| 2024 | Foshan Nanshi | 21 | (1) |
| 2025–2026 | Guangdong GZ-Power | 23 | (1) |
| 2026– | Shijiazhuang Gongfu | 0 | (0) |
- * Club domestic league appearances and goals as of 31 December 2020

Ma Junliang (Chinese: 马俊亮; pinyin: Mǎ Jùnliàng; Mandarin pronunciation: [mà tɕŷn ljâŋ]; born 2 March 1998 in Guangzhou) is a Chinese professional football player who currently plays for Chinese League One side Shijiazhuang Gongfu as a forward.

== Club career ==
Ma Junliang was promoted to Chinese Super League side Guangzhou R&F first team squad by manager Dragan Stojković in the summer of 2016. He made his senior debut on 6 August 2017 in a 4–1 home victory against Liaoning FC, coming on as a substitute for Li Tixiang in the extra time. On 5 May 2018, he scored his first senior goal in a 4–2 home win over Shanghai Greenland Shenhua.

On 3 July 2026, Ma transferred to Chinese League One side Shijiazhuang Gongfu.

== Career statistics ==
Statistics accurate as of match played 5 November 2023.

Appearances and goals by club, season and competition
| Club | Season | League | | | National Cup | | Continental | | Other | | Total | |
| Club | Season | Division | Apps | Goals | Apps | Goals | Apps | Goals | Apps | Goals | Apps | Goals |
|---|---|---|---|---|---|---|---|---|---|---|---|---|
| Guangzhou R&F | 2017 | Chinese Super League | 1 | 0 | 0 | 0 | - | | - | | 1 | 0 |
| Guangzhou R&F | 2018 | Chinese Super League | 19 | 1 | 3 | 0 | - | | - | | 22 | 1 |
| Guangzhou R&F | 2019 | Chinese Super League | 6 | 0 | 0 | 0 | - | | - | | 6 | 0 |
| Guangzhou R&F | Total | | 26 | 1 | 3 | 0 | 0 | 0 | 0 | 0 | 29 | 1 |
| Shaanxi Chang'an Athletic | 2021 | China League One | 31 | 5 | 1 | 1 | - | | - | | 32 | 6 |
| Shaanxi Chang'an Athletic | 2022 | China League One | 27 | 5 | 0 | 0 | - | | - | | 27 | 5 |
| Shaanxi Chang'an Athletic | Total | | 58 | 10 | 1 | 1 | 0 | 0 | 0 | 0 | 59 | 11 |
| Nanjing City | 2023 | China League One | 5 | 0 | 2 | 0 | - | | - | | 7 | 0 |
| Dongguan United (loan) | 2023 | China League One | 15 | 0 | - | | - | | - | | 15 | 0 |
| Career total | | | 104 | 11 | 6 | 1 | 0 | 0 | 0 | 0 | 110 | 12 |
