= Chen Weiming (footballer) =

Chinese footballer (born 1997)

Chen Weiming 陈伟铭
Personal information
- Full name: Chen Weiming
- Date of birth: 9 April 1997 (age 29)
- Place of birth: Guangzhou, Guangdong, China
- Height: 1.78 m (5 ft 10 in)
- Position: Defender

Team information
- Current team: Guangzhou R&F
- Number: 40

Youth career
- Guangzhou R&F

Senior career*
Years	Team	Apps	(Gls)
2016–	Guangzhou R&F	13	(0)
- * Club domestic league appearances and goals as of 31 December 2020

Chen Weiming (Chinese: 陈伟铭; pinyin: Chén Wěimíng; Mandarin pronunciation: [ʈʂʰə̌n wèɪ mǐŋ]; born 24 September 1997) is a Chinese footballer who plays for Chinese Super League side Guangzhou R&F.

== Club career ==
Chen Weiming was promoted to Chinese Super League side Guangzhou R&F first team squad by manager Dragan Stojković in the summer of 2016. He made his senior debut on 31 March 2018 in a 2–1 away win over Changchun Yatai, coming on as a substitute for Chang Feiya in the 88th minute.

== Career statistics ==
As of 31 December 2020.

Appearances and goals by club, season and competition
Club	Season	League			National Cup		Continental		Other		Total	
Club	Season	Division	Apps	Goals	Apps	Goals	Apps	Goals	Apps	Goals	Apps	Goals
Guangzhou R&F	2016	Chinese Super League	0	0	0	0	-		-		0	0
Guangzhou R&F	2017	Chinese Super League	0	0	0	0	-		-		0	0
Guangzhou R&F	2018	Chinese Super League	10	0	3	0	-		-		13	0
Guangzhou R&F	2019	Chinese Super League	3	0	0	0	-		-		3	0
Guangzhou R&F	Total		13	0	3	0	0	0	0	0	16	0
Career total			13	0	3	0	0	0	0	0	16	0
