= 2019 Guangzhou R&F F.C. season =

Guangzhou R&F 2019
- Head coach: Dragan Stojković
- Stadium: Yuexiushan Stadium
- Super League: 12th
- FA Cup: 4th Round
- Top goalscorer: League: Eran Zahavi (29 goals); All: Eran Zahavi (29 goals)
- Highest home attendance: 13,516 vs Guangzhou Evergrande Taobao; 20 July 2019 (Chinese Super League)
- Lowest home attendance: 8,938 vs Tianjin TEDA; 16 July 2019 (Chinese Super League)
- Average home league attendance: 10,468
Away colours

The 2019 Guangzhou R&F season is the 9th year in Guangzhou R&F's existence and its 8th season in the Chinese football league, also its 8th season in the top flight.

== Coaching and medical staff ==
Position	Staff
Head coach	(Serbia) Dragan Stojković
Assistant coaches	(Serbia) Bratislav Živković
Assistant coaches	(Serbia) Slobodan Marović (to July 27)
Assistant coaches	(England) Terry Butcher (from July 27)
Fitness coaches	(Japan) Katsuhito Kinoshi
Fitness coaches	(South Africa) Divan Augustyn (to June)
Fitness coaches	(Israel) Eran Shado (from June)
Goalkeeper coach	(China) Huang Hongtao
Team leader	(China) Huang Jun
Team physicians	(Netherlands) Marco van der Steen
Team physicians	(China) Mai Zhiyuan
Team physicians	(China) Fan Bihua
Technical analyst	(China) Chen Jiachao
Interpreters	(China) Hong Wenjie
Interpreters	(China) Weng Zhanhong

Source: Guangzhou R&F F.C.

== Squad ==
=== Winter ===
As of 1 March 2019

==== First team ====
Note: Flags indicate national team as defined under FIFA eligibility rules; some limited exceptions apply. Players may hold more than one non-FIFA nationality.

No.	Pos.	Nation	Player
1	GK	CHN	Cheng Yuelei
2	DF	CHN	Zou Zheng
3	DF	SRB	Duško Tošić
4	MF	CHN	Zhang Gong
6	MF	CHN	Fan Yunlong
7	MF	ISR	Eran Zahavi
8	MF	BEL	Mousa Dembélé
9	FW	CHN	Gui Hong
10	MF	ISR	Dia Saba
11	DF	CHN	Ding Haifeng
13	MF	CHN	Ye Chugui
17	DF	CHN	Zhang Chenlong
18	DF	CHN	Yi Teng
19	DF	CHN	Jiang Jihong
20	DF	CHN	Tang Miao
22	GK	CHN	Han Jiaqi

No.	Pos.	Nation	Player
23	MF	CHN	Lu Lin
25	GK	CHN	Han Feng
26	FW	CHN	Ma Junliang
27	DF	CHN	Jin Pengxiang
29	FW	CHN	Xiao Zhi
30	MF	CHN	Wang Peng
31	DF	CHN	Wang Jianan
32	MF	CHN	Chen Zhizhao
33	FW	CHN	Jin Bo
34	DF	CHN	Zheng Zhiming
35	MF	CHN	Li Tixiang
36	DF	CHN	Huang Zhengyu
37	MF	CHN	Li Yuyang
39	MF	CHN	Zhao Keda
40	DF	CHN	Chen Weiming

==== Reserve team ====
Note: Flags indicate national team as defined under FIFA eligibility rules; some limited exceptions apply. Players may hold more than one non-FIFA nationality.

No.	Pos.	Nation	Player
41	GK	CHN	Yin Tianlong
42	GK	CHN	Long Wenhao
43	DF	CHN	Deng Zhiyao
44	DF	CHN	Zhang Chaoqun
45	DF	CHN	Liu Jiale
46	DF	CHN	Li Long
47	DF	CHN	Hu Diji
48	MF	CHN	Mai Jiajian
49	MF	CHN	Li Ming
50	DF	CHN	Xu Zhengwei

No.	Pos.	Nation	Player
51	MF	CHN	Chen Yajun
52	DF	CHN	Wang Xin
53	FW	CHN	Geng Taili
54	FW	CHN	Fang Jinzhao
55	FW	CHN	Zhang Fushun
56	DF	CHN	Fu Yuncheng
57	MF	CHN	Huang Jingbin
58	MF	CHN	Huang Zihao
59	MF	CHN	He Zilin
60	MF	CHN	Cai Haojian

=== Summer ===
As of 1 August 2019

==== First team ====
Note: Flags indicate national team as defined under FIFA eligibility rules; some limited exceptions apply. Players may hold more than one non-FIFA nationality.

No.	Pos.	Nation	Player
1	GK	CHN	Cheng Yuelei
2	DF	CHN	Zou Zheng
3	DF	SRB	Duško Tošić
4	MF	CHN	Zhang Gong
6	MF	CHN	Fan Yunlong
7	MF	ISR	Eran Zahavi
8	MF	BEL	Mousa Dembélé
9	FW	CHN	Gui Hong
10	MF	ISR	Dia Saba
11	DF	CHN	Ding Haifeng
13	FW	CHN	Ye Chugui
15	DF	CHN	Wang Huapeng
16	MF	HKG	Tan Chun Lok
18	DF	CHN	Yi Teng
19	DF	CHN	Jiang Jihong

No.	Pos.	Nation	Player
20	DF	CHN	Tang Miao
22	GK	CHN	Han Jiaqi
23	MF	CHN	Lu Lin (Captain)
25	GK	CHN	Han Feng
26	FW	CHN	Ma Junliang
27	DF	CHN	Jin Pengxiang
29	FW	CHN	Xiao Zhi
30	MF	CHN	Wang Peng
32	MF	CHN	Chen Zhizhao
33	FW	CHN	Jin Bo
35	MF	CHN	Li Tixiang
36	DF	CHN	Huang Zhengyu
37	MF	CHN	Li Yuyang
39	MF	CHN	Zhao Keda
40	DF	CHN	Chen Weiming

==== Reserve team ====
Note: Flags indicate national team as defined under FIFA eligibility rules; some limited exceptions apply. Players may hold more than one non-FIFA nationality.

No.	Pos.	Nation	Player
41	GK	CHN	Yin Tianlong
42	GK	CHN	Long Wenhao
43	DF	CHN	Deng Zhiyao
44	MF	CHN	Zhang Chaoqun
45	DF	CHN	Liu Jiale
47	DF	CHN	Hu Diji
48	FW	CHN	Mai Jiajian
49	MF	CHN	Li Ming
50	MF	CHN	Xu Zhengwei
51	MF	CHN	Chen Yajun
52	DF	CHN	Wang Xin

No.	Pos.	Nation	Player
53	FW	CHN	Geng Taili
54	FW	CHN	Fang Jinzhao
55	DF	CHN	Zhang Fushun
56	DF	CHN	Fu Yuncheng
58	FW	CHN	Huang Zihao
59	MF	CHN	He Zilin
61	MF	CHN	Chen Fuhai
62	MF	CHN	Ning An
63	FW	CHN	Zhang Jiajie
64	FW	CHN	Li Rui
65	GK	CHN	Liang Hua

== Transfers ==
=== Winter ===
==== In ====
Squad number	Position	Player	Age	Moving from	Type	Transfer fee	Date	Source
8	MF	(Belgium) Mousa Dembélé	31	(England) Tottenham Hotspur	Transfer	£11m	17 January 2019	
6	MF	(China) Fan Yunlong	29	(China) Guizhou Hengfeng	Transfer	£2.22m	22 January 2019	
9	FW	(China) Gui Hong	24	Hebei China Fortune	Transfer	£2.34m	24 January 2019	
10	MF	(Israel) Dia Saba	26	(Israel) Hapoel Be'er Sheva	Transfer	£3.93m	1 February 2019	
33	FW	(China) Jin Bo	26	(China) Yanbian Funde	Transfer	Free	5 February 2019	
27	DF	(China) Jin Pengxiang	29	(China) Beijing Sinobo Guoan	Loan		25 February 2019	
22	GK	(China) Han Jiaqi	19	(Portugal) C.D. Aves	Transfer	Unknown	28 February 2019	
2	DF	(China) Zou Zheng	31	(China) Guangzhou Evergrande Taobao	Transfer	£2.36m	28 February 2019	

==== Out ====
Squad number	Position	Player	Age	Moving to	Type	Transfer fee	Date	Source
8	MF	(Brazil) Júnior Urso	29	(Brazil) Corinthians	Transfer	Free	30 January 2019	
10	MF	(Brazil) Renatinho	30	(China) Tianjin Tianhai	Loan Out		28 February 2019	
9	FW	(China) Chang Feiya	26	(China) Wuhan Zall	Loan Out		28 February 2019	
27	MF	(China) Zhang Jiajie	22	(China) Sichuan Longfor	Loan Out		28 February 2019	

=== Summer ===
==== In ====
Squad number	Position	Player	Age	Moving from	Type	Transfer fee	Date	Source
16	MF	(Hong Kong) Tan Chun Lok	23	R&F (Hong Kong)	End of Loan		16 July 2019	
15	DF	(China) Wang Huapeng	19	(Spain) Real Sociedad U-19	Free Transfer		31 July 2019	

==== Out ====
Squad number	Position	Player	Age	Moving to	Type	Transfer fee	Date	Source
17	DF	(China) Zhang Chenlong	26	(China) Beijing Renhe	Loan Out		6 July 2019	

== Friendlies ==
=== Mid-season ===
22 May 2018	Guangzhou R&F (China)	0–4	(Germany) Borussia Mönchengladbach	Guangzhou, Guangdong
20:00 UTC+8			Neuhaus 2'; Drmić 14'; Pléa 33'; Hofmann 90+1'	Stadium: Yuexiushan Stadium; Attendance: 6,783; Referee: Gu Chunhan; Assistant referees: Zhong Yong; Pan Mai; Fourth official: Gan Shuran

23 July 2018	Guangzhou R&F (China)	0–4	(England) Southampton F.C.	Macau
20:00 UTC+8			Adams 1'; Long 18'; Valery 38'; Klarer 90+1'	Stadium: Estádio Campo Desportivo; Attendance: 10,000

== Competitions ==
Win Draw Loss

=== Chinese Super League ===
==== Table ====
Pos	Team	Pld	W	D	L	GF	GA	GD	Pts	Qualification or relegation
10	Chongqing Dangdai Lifan	30	9	9	12	36	47	−11	36	
11	Hebei China Fortune	30	9	6	15	37	55	−18	33	
12	Guangzhou R&F	30	9	5	16	54	72	−18	32	
13	Shanghai Greenland Shenhua	30	8	6	16	43	57	−14	30	Qualification for AFC Champions League group stage (Note: Shanghai Greenland Shenhua qualified for the AFC Champions League group stage as Chinese FA Cup winners.)
14	Tianjin Tianhai (D)	30	4	13	13	40	53	−13	25	Dissolved at May 2020 after season 2019

Source: CSL
Rules for classification:
- During season: 1) Points; 2) Goal difference; 3) Goals scored.
- After season: 1) Points; 2) Head-to-head points; 3) Head-to-head goal difference; 4) Head-to-head goals scored; 5) Scores of the weight ratio of the reserve league and youth leagues.
  (D) Disqualified
  Notes:

==== Results by round ====
Round	1	2	3	4	5	6	7	8	9	10	11	12	13	14	15	16	17	18	19	20	21	22	23	24	25	26	27	28	29	30
Ground	A	H	A	A	H	A	H	A	A	H	A	H	H	A	H	H	A	H	H	A	H	A	H	H	H	A	A	A	H	A
Result	D	D	L	L	W	L	W	L	W	W	L	D	L	L	W	W	L	W	L	L	D	L	D	W	L	L	W	L	L	L
Position	7	9	12	14	11	11	9	12	10	8	8	9	9	10	9	8	10	7	9	10	10	11	11	11	12	12	11	11	11	12

Updated to match(es) played on 7 December 2019. Source: Chinese Super League Table (in Chinese)
A = Away; H = Home; W = Win; D = Draw; L = Loss

==== Results summary ====
Overall								Home						Away					
Pld	W	D	L	GF	GA	GD	Pts	W	D	L	GF	GA	GD	W	D	L	GF	GA	GD
30	9	5	16	54	72	−18	32	7	4	4	32	32	0	2	1	12	22	40	−18

Last updated: 7 December 2019.
Source: Competitive Matches

==== League Matches ====
2 March 2019 1	Chongqing Dangdai Lifan	2–2	Guangzhou R&F	Chongqing
15:30 UTC+8	Kardec 25' (pen.), 90+3'; Jiang Zhe (yellow card) 28'; Luo Hao (yellow card) 38'		Dembélé (yellow card) 10'; Ye Chugui 56' (yellow card) 64'; Zahavi 74'; Tang Miao (yellow card) 87'	Stadium: Chongqing Olympic Sports Center; Attendance: 33,586; Referee: Wang Di; Assistant referees: Zhang Cheng; Ma Kexi; Fourth official: Hei Xiaohu

9 March 2019 2	Guangzhou R&F	3–3	Dalian Yifang	Guangzhou, Guangdong
19:35 UTC+8	Ding Haifeng (yellow card) 9'; Tang Miao (yellow card) 24'; Saba 33'; Zahavi 68', 90+7'; Li Tixiang (yellow card) 89'		Carrasco 42' (pen.), 56' (yellow card) 90+1'; Zheng Long 86'	Stadium: Yuexiushan Stadium; Attendance: 9,309; Referee: Shi Zhenlu; Assistant referees: Tao Fei; Xi Fei; Fourth official: Jin Jingyuan

29 March 2019 3	Tianjin TEDA	4–3	Guangzhou R&F	Tianjin
19:35 UTC+8	Metjan 20'; Xie Weijun 27'; Yang Fan (yellow card) 41'; Johnathan 53'; Acheampong (yellow card) 64' (goal) 90+4'		Gui Hong 40'; Lu Lin (yellow card) 65' (yellow-red card) 65'; Zahavi 84'; Dembélé 86'; Tošić (yellow card) 89'	Stadium: Tianjin Olympic Center Stadium; Attendance: 30,680; Referee: Shen Yinhao; Assistant referees: Zhang Cheng; Guo Jingtao; Fourth official: Huang Yi

6 April 2019 4	Guangzhou Evergrande Taobao	2–0	Guangzhou R&F	Guangzhou, Guangdong
19:35 UTC+8	Talisca 13', 61'; Zheng Zhi (yellow card) 84'			Stadium: Tianhe Stadium; Attendance: 49,531; Referee: Mark Clattenburg; Assistant referees: Song Xiangyun; Shen Pengxiang; Fourth official: Ai Kun

12 April 2019 5	Guangzhou R&F	2–1	Shanghai Greenland Shenhua	Guangzhou, Guangdong
19:35 UTC+8	Zahavi 65'; Fan Yunlong (yellow card) 73'; Wang Peng (yellow card) 82'; Zhu Jianrong 90+6' (o.g.)		Cong Zhen (yellow card) 55'; Ighalo 90' (pen.)	Stadium: Yuexiushan Stadium; Attendance: 9,203; Referee: Huang Yejun; Assistant referees: Cao Yi; Ma Kexi; Fourth official: Niu Minghui

21 April 2019 6	Jiangsu Suning	5–1	Guangzhou R&F	Nanjing, Jiangsu
17:30 UTC+8	Éder 3', 65'; Teixeira 20', 26'; Xie Pengfei 88'		Tošić 12'; Ye Chugui (yellow card) 44'; Tang Miao (yellow card) 76'	Stadium: Nanjing Olympic Sports Centre; Attendance: 28,693; Referee: Ai Kun; Assistant referees: Hu Chengjun; Xi Fei; Fourth official: Kou Jianxun

12 April 2019 7	Guangzhou R&F	3–1	Shenzhen	Guangzhou, Guangdong
19:35 UTC+8	Zahavi 37', 45', 90+5'; Wang Peng (yellow card) 79'		Jin Qiang (yellow card) 15'; Preciado 17'; Wang Dalong (yellow card) 39'; Wang Peng (yellow card) 66'; Zhang Yuan (yellow card) 72'	Stadium: Yuexiushan Stadium; Attendance: 9,509; Referee: Ma Ning; Assistant referees: Song Xiangyun; Liu Jinyu; Fourth official: Ma Li

4 May 2019 8	Shanghai SIPG	2–0	Guangzhou R&F	Shanghai
17:30 UTC+8	Zhang Wei (yellow card) 30'; Li Shenglong 60'; Wei Zhen (yellow card) 69'; Hulk 74'		Tošić (yellow card) 44'; Ye Chugui (yellow card) 56'	Stadium: Shanghai Stadium; Attendance: 20,933; Referee: Muhammad Taqi; Assistant referees: Huo Weiming; Ma Kexi; Fourth official: Niu Minghui

12 May 2019 9	Tianjin Tianhai	1–2	Guangzhou R&F	Tianjin
15:30 UTC+8	Sun Ke 64'		Zahavi 25'; Zhang Gong (yellow card) 58'; Yi Teng (yellow card) 66'; Saba 78'; Dembélé (yellow card) 82'	Stadium: Tianjin Olympic Center Stadium; Attendance: 10,400; Referee: Jonathan Barreiro; Assistant referees: Cao Yi; Huang Tao; Fourth official: Hei Xiaohu

18 May 2019 10	Guangzhou R&F	3–1	Beijing Renhe	Guangzhou, Guangdong
15:30 UTC+8	Fan Yunlong (yellow card) 34'; Zhang Gong (yellow card) 38'; Saba 38', 72'; Zahavi 50'		Aluko 2'; Cao Yongjing (yellow card) 25'; Wan Houliang (yellow card) 90+2'	Stadium: Yuexiushan Stadium; Attendance: 10,828; Referee: Milorad Mažić; Assistant referees: Zhang Cheng; Zhang Qiangjing; Fourth official: Tang Shunqi

26 May 2019 11	Shandong Luneng Taishan	3–1	Guangzhou R&F	Jinan, Shandong
19:35 UTC+8	Fellaini 33'; Gil 61'; Hao Junmin 67'		Zahavi 55'	Stadium: Jinan Olympic Sports Center Stadium; Attendance: 20,520; Referee: Kurt Ams; Assistant referees: Huo Weiming; Hu Chengjun; Fourth official: Shen Yinhao

1 June 2019 12	Guangzhou R&F	2–2	Hebei China Fortune	Guangzhou, Guangdong
19:35 UTC+8	Tang Miao (yellow card) 45+1'; Saba 52'; Jiang Jihong 86'		Ren Hang 30'; Zhang Chengdong (yellow card) 45+1'; Mascherano (yellow card) 53'; Wang Qiuming 30'	Stadium: Yuexiushan Stadium; Attendance: 9,358; Referee: Wang Jing; Assistant referees: Cao Yi; Huang Tao; Fourth official: Ma Li

15 June 2019 13	Guangzhou R&F	3–4	Wuhan Zall	Guangzhou, Guangdong
19:35 UTC+8	Zhang Gong (yellow card) 12'; Zahavi 18', 45+3', 61'		Rafael Silva 39', 67'; Song Zhiwei 70'; Evrard 72'; Baptistão (yellow card) 90'	Stadium: Yuexiushan Stadium; Attendance: 9,189; Referee: Shi Zhenlu; Assistant referees: Shi Xiang; Jiang Bo; Fourth official: Chen Gang

22 June 2019 14	Beijing Sinobo Guoan	3–2	Guangzhou R&F	Beijing
17:30 UTC+8	Wang Gang (yellow card) 2'; Wang Ziming 5'; Yu Dabao (yellow card) 21' (goal) 54'; Augusto 90+3'		Zahavi 22' (pen.), 36' (pen.) (red card) 84'; Ding Haifeng (yellow card) 46'; Wang Peng (yellow card) 75'	Stadium: Workers' Stadium; Attendance: 35,013; Referee: Ma Ning; Assistant referees: Song Xiangyun; Tang Rongdi; Fourth official: Liu Wei

29 June 2019 15	Guangzhou R&F	2–0	Henan Jianye	Guangzhou, Guangdong
19:35 UTC+8	Zhang Gong (yellow card) 14'; Ye Chugui (yellow card) 20'; Saba 44' (pen.), 65'; Huang Zhengyu (yellow card) 88'		Abduwali Ablet (yellow card) 58'	Stadium: Yuexiushan Stadium; Attendance: 9,118; Referee: Ai Kun; Assistant referees: Liu Jinyu; Ma Kexi; Fourth official: Zhao Zhizhi

6 July 2019 16	Guangzhou R&F	4–2	Chongqing Dangdai Lifan	Guangzhou, Guangdong
19:35 UTC+8	Tošić 29'; Zahavi 64', 73' (pen.); Jiang Jihong (yellow card) 83'; Saba 90+2'		Kardec 45+2'; Adrian 49'; Peng Xinli (yellow card) 59'	Stadium: Yuexiushan Stadium; Attendance: 10,318; Referee: Wang Jing; Assistant referees: Zhou Fei; Ma Ji; Fourth official: Yu Bo

12 July 2019 17	Dalian Yifang	3–2	Guangzhou R&F	Dalian, Liaoning
19:35 UTC+8	Carrasco 25' (pen.), 74'; Li Shuai (yellow card) 45+1'; Boateng 52'; Qin Sheng (yellow card) 65'		Zahavi 19' (pen.), 63'; Wang Peng (yellow card) 33'; Li Tixiang (yellow card) 79'; Saba (yellow card) 84'; Ma Junliang (yellow card) 90+2'	Stadium: Dalian Sports Center Stadium; Attendance: 41,949; Referee: Wang Zhe; Assistant referees: Zhang Cheng; Yu Yue; Fourth official: Guan Xing

16 July 2019 18	Guangzhou R&F	2–1	Tianjin TEDA	Guangzhou, Guangdong
18:00 UTC+8	Zahavi 9' (pen.), 34'; Dembélé (yellow card) 56'; Tang Miao (yellow card) 62'; Ma Junliang (yellow card) 64'; Ding Haifeng (yellow card) 78'		Yang Fan (yellow card) 8' (yellow-red card) 90+3'; Zheng Kaimu 18' (yellow card) 65'	Stadium: Yuexiushan Stadium; Attendance: 8,938; Referee: Ma Ning; Assistant referees: Liu Jinyu; Shen Pengxiang; Fourth official: Liu Wei

20 July 2019 19	Guangzhou R&F	0–5	Guangzhou Evergrande Taobao	Guangzhou, Guangdong
19:35 UTC+8	Wang Peng (yellow card) 40'		Wei Shihao (penalty missed) 12' (pen.) 13'; Elkeson 42', 78' (pen.), 87'; Paulinho 51'	Stadium: Yuexiushan Stadium; Attendance: 13,516; Referee: Milorad Mažić; Assistant referees: Wang Dexin; Hu Chengjun; Fourth official: Lin Jun

27 July 2019 20	Shanghai Greenland Shenhua	5–3	Guangzhou R&F	Shanghai
19:35 UTC+8	Moreno 13', 19'; Sun Shilin (yellow card) 51'; Kim Shin-wook 58', 60', 76'		Zahavi 5'; Ye Chugui 41'; Saba (yellow card) 65' (goal) 90+3'	Stadium: Hongkou Football Stadium; Attendance: 23,115; Referee: Mark Clattenburg; Assistant referees: Huo Weiming; Yang Yang; Fourth official: Niu Minghui

2 August 2019 21	Guangzhou R&F	2–2	Jiangsu Suning	Guangzhou, Guangdong
20:00 UTC+8	Zahavi 21'; Fan Yunlong (yellow card) 31'; Ye Chugui (yellow card) 36'; Ding Haifeng (yellow card) 37'; Saba 49'		Teixeira 27'; Éder 54'; He Chao (yellow card) 79'	Stadium: Yuexiushan Stadium; Attendance: 11,036; Referee: Guan Xing; Assistant referees: Ma Ji; Tang Rongdi; Fourth official: Hei Xiaohu

9 August 2019 23	Guangzhou R&F	2–2	Shanghai SIPG	Guangzhou, Guangdong
19:35 UTC+8	Zhang Gong (yellow card) 45+1'; Xiao Zhi 61'; Tošić 90+8'		Shi Ke (yellow card) 38'; Lin Chuangyi (yellow card) 45+2'; Arnautovic 69' (pen.); Hu Jinghang 78'	Stadium: Yuexiushan Stadium; Attendance: 13,508; Referee: Ma Ning; Assistant referees: Cao Yi; Shi Xiang; Fourth official: Kou Jianxun

14 August 2019 22	Shenzhen	4–0	Guangzhou R&F	Shenzhen, Guangdong
19:35 UTC+8	Jin Qiang (yellow card) 33'; Sousa 45' (pen.), 90+4'; John Mary 54' (pen.); Preciado (penalty missed) 72' (pen.); Gan Chao (yellow card) 74' (goal) 90'		Zahavi (yellow card) 31'; Jiang Jihong (red card) 43'; Cheng Yuelei (yellow card) 44'; Tošić (yellow card) 69' (yellow-red card) 69'; Li Tixiang (yellow card) 69'	Stadium: Shenzhen Universiade Sports Centre; Attendance: 12,906; Referee: Matthew Conger; Assistant referees: Zhou Fei; Zhang Qiangjing; Fourth official: Zhang Long

14 September 2019 24	Guangzhou R&F	2–1	Tianjin Tianhai	Guangzhou, Guangdong
19:35 UTC+8	Zahavi 42', 90'; Yi Teng (yellow card) 45+3'; Chen Zhizhao (yellow card) 70'		Yang Xu 18'; Zhang Cheng (yellow card) 86'	Stadium: Yuexiushan Stadium; Attendance: 9,013; Referee: Kevin Blom; Assistant referees: Dave Goossens; Cao Yi; Fourth official: Xia Jun

19 October 2019 26	Guangzhou R&F	1–3	Shandong Luneng Taishan	Guangzhou, Guangdong
17:30 UTC+8	Dembélé (yellow card) 46'; Saba (yellow card) 52'; Zahavi 90+1'		Liu Binbin 21'; Jin Jingdao (yellow card) 37'; Guedes 45+3'; Fellaini 65' (yellow card) 85'	Stadium: Yuexiushan Stadium; Attendance: 11,823; Referee: Shen Yinhao; Assistant referees: Sun Kai; Yang Yang; Fourth official: Guan Xing

26 October 2019 27	Hebei China Fortune	2–1	Guangzhou R&F	Langfang, Hebei
15:30 UTC+8	Mascherano (penalty missed) 8' (pen.); Wang Qiuming (yellow card) 54'; Marcão 69', 90+8' (pen.)		Jin Pengxiang (yellow card) 23'; Zahavi 38'; Chen Zhizhao (yellow card) 77'; Zou Zheng (yellow card) 79'; Zhang Gong (yellow card) 90+8'	Stadium: Langfang Stadium; Attendance: 16,759; Referee: Ai Kun; Assistant referees: Zhou Fei; Deng Bo; Fourth official: Mai Maitijiang

1 November 2019 25	Beijing Renhe	1–4	Guangzhou R&F	Beijing
15:30 UTC+8	Jin Hui 14'; Du Wenyang (yellow card) 82'; Augusto (red card) 88'		Chen Zhizhao (yellow card) 31'; Yi Teng 47'; Zahavi 50'; Saba 58', 61'; Tang Miao (yellow card) 82'	Stadium: Beijing Fengtai Stadium; Attendance: 2,831; Referee: Mark Clattenburg; Assistant referees: Zhang Cheng; Zhou Fei; Fourth official: Wu Liying

22 November 2019 28	Wuhan Zall	2–1	Guangzhou R&F	Wuhan, Hubei
19:35 UTC+8	Liu Yun (footballer) 2', 23'		Li Tixiang (yellow card) 36' (yellow-red card) 90'; Gui Hong 47'; Zahavi (yellow card) 86'	Stadium: Dongxihu Sports Centre; Attendance: 18,183; Referee: Ma Ning; Assistant referees: Zhang Cheng; Yu Yue; Fourth official: Mai Maitijiang

27 November 2019 29	Guangzhou R&F	1–4	Beijing Sinobo Guoan	Guangzhou, Guangdong
19:35 UTC+8	Saba 42'; Chen Zhizhao (yellow card) 45+1'; Tan Chun Lok (yellow card) 63'; Zou Zheng (yellow card) 69'		Augusto 28'; Bakambu 31', 33'; Zhang Yuning 48'; Fernando (yellow card) 88'	Stadium: Yuexiushan Stadium; Attendance: 12,356; Referee: Mark Clattenburg; Assistant referees: Hu Chengjun; Shen Pengxiang; Fourth official: Liu Wei

1 December 2019 30	Henan Jianye	1–0	Guangzhou R&F	Zhengzhou, Henan
15:00 UTC+8	Ma Xingyu 49'		Fan Yunlong (yellow card) 10'; Zhang Gong (yellow card) 33'	Stadium: Zhengzhou Hanghai Stadium; Attendance: 19,566; Referee: Guan Xing; Assistant referees: Huo Weiming; Guo Jingtao; Fourth official: Niu Minghui

=== Chinese FA Cup ===
1 May 2018 Fourth round	Taizhou Yuanda	1–0	Guangzhou R&F	Taizhou, Jiangsu
15:30 UTC+8	Xu Jiajun 47'		Fan Yunlong (red card) 62'	Stadium: Taixing Sports Centre; Referee: Zhang Xiaochen; Assistant referees: Yuan Kun; Ning Zhaobing; Fourth official: Zhang Haijun

== Statistics ==
As of 7 December 2019 (Friendly matches excluded)

=== Appearances and goals ===
No.	Pos.	Player	Super League			FA Cup			Total		
No.	Pos.	Player	Apps.	Starts	Goals	Apps.	Starts	Goals	Apps.	Starts	Goals
1	GK	(China) Cheng Yuelei	29	29	0	0	0	0	29	29	0
2	DF	(China) Zou Zheng	9	9	0	1	1	0	10	10	0
3	DF	(Serbia) Duško Tošić	12	11	3	0	0	0	12	11	3
4	MF	(China) Zhang Gong	13	8	0	1	1	0	14	9	0
6	MF	(China) Fan Yunlong	18	16	0	0	0	0	18	16	0
7	FW	(Israel) Eran Zahavi	28	27	29	0	0	0	28	27	29
8	MF	(Belgium) Mousa Dembélé	26	24	1	0	0	0	26	24	1
9	FW	(China) Gui Hong	13	8	2	1	1	0	14	9	2
10	MF	(Israel) Dia Saba	26	24	13	0	0	0	26	24	13
11	DF	(China) Ding Haifeng	20	20	0	0	0	0	20	20	0
13	MF	(China) Ye Chugui	25	17	2	1	0	0	26	17	2
16	MF	(Hong Kong) Tan Chun Lok	3	0	0	0	0	0	3	0	0
17	DF	(China) Zhang Chenlong	1	1	0	0	0	0	1	1	0
18	DF	(China) Yi Teng	28	25	1	0	0	0	28	25	1
19	DF	(China) Jiang Jihong	19	17	1	0	0	0	19	17	1
20	DF	(China) Tang Miao	28	28	0	1	0	0	29	28	0
22	GK	(China) Han Jiaqi	2	1	0	1	1	0	3	2	0
23	MF	(China) Lu Lin	19	10	0	1	1	0	20	11	0
26	MF	(China) Ma Junliang	7	3	0	0	0	0	7	3	0
27	DF	(China) Jin Pengxiang	7	7	0	1	1	0	8	8	0
29	FW	(China) Xiao Zhi	6	3	1	0	0	0	6	3	1
30	MF	(China) Wang Peng	18	10	0	1	0	0	19	10	0
31	DF	(China) Wang Jianan	0	0	0	1	1	0	1	1	0
32	MF	(China) Chen Zhizhao	14	8	0	1	1	0	15	9	0
33	FW	(China) Jin Bo	4	1	0	1	1	0	5	2	0
35	DF	(China) Li Tixiang	14	10	0	1	1	0	15	11	0
36	DF	(China) Huang Zhengyu	16	6	0	1	1	0	17	7	0
37	MF	(China) Li Yuyang	10	5	0	0	0	0	10	5	0
40	DF	(China) Chen Weiming	3	0	0	0	0	0	3	0	0
TOTALS					53			0			53

=== Goalscorers ===
Rank	Player	No.	Pos.	Super League	FA Cup	Total
1	(Israel) Zahavi	7	FW	29	0	29
2	(Israel) Saba	10	MF	13	0	13
3	(Serbia) Tošić	3	DF	3	0	3
4	(China) Gui Hong	9	FW	2	0	2
4	(China) Ye Chugui	13	MF	2	0	2
6	(Belgium) Dembélé	8	MF	1	0	1
6	(China) Yi Teng	18	DF	1	0	1
6	(China) Jiang Jihong	19	DF	1	0	1
6	(China) Xiao Zhi	29	FW	1	0	1
Own Goal				1	0	1
TOTALS				54	0	54

=== Disciplinary record ===
No.	Pos.	Player	Super League			FA Cup			Total		
No.	Pos.	Player	Booked	(yellow card) (yellow-red card)	Sent off (straight red)	Booked	(yellow card) (yellow-red card)	Sent off (straight red)	Booked	(yellow card) (yellow-red card)	Sent off (straight red)
1	GK	(China) Cheng Yuelei	1	0	0	0	0	0	1	0	0
2	DF	(China) Zou Zheng	2	0	0	0	0	0	2	0	0
3	DF	(Serbia) Duško Tošić	4	1	0	0	0	0	4	1	0
4	MF	(China) Zhang Gong	7	0	0	0	0	0	7	0	0
6	MF	(China) Fan Yunlong	4	0	0	0	0	1	4	0	1
7	FW	(Israel) Eran Zahavi	2	0	1	0	0	0	2	0	1
8	MF	(Belgium) Mousa Dembélé	4	0	0	0	0	0	4	0	0
10	MF	(Israel) Dia Saba	3	0	0	0	0	0	3	0	0
11	DF	(China) Ding Haifeng	4	0	0	0	0	0	4	0	0
13	MF	(China) Ye Chugui	5	0	0	0	0	0	5	0	0
16	MF	(Hong Kong) Tan Chun Lok	1	0	0	0	0	0	1	0	0
18	DF	(China) Yi Teng	2	0	0	0	0	0	2	0	0
19	DF	(China) Jiang Jihong	1	0	1	0	0	0	1	0	1
20	DF	(China) Tang Miao	6	0	0	0	0	0	6	0	0
23	MF	(China) Lu Lin	0	1	0	0	0	0	0	1	0
26	MF	(China) Ma Junliang	2	0	0	0	0	0	2	0	0
27	DF	(China) Jin Pengxiang	1	0	0	0	0	0	1	0	0
30	MF	(China) Wang Peng	5	0	0	0	0	0	5	0	0
32	MF	(China) Chen Zhizhao	4	0	0	0	0	0	4	0	0
35	MF	(China) Li Tixiang	3	1	0	0	0	0	3	1	0
36	DF	(China) Huang Zhengyu	1	0	0	0	0	0	1	0	0
TOTALS			62	3	2	0	0	1	62	3	3
