= Mousa Dembélé (Belgian footballer) =

Belgian footballer (born 1987)

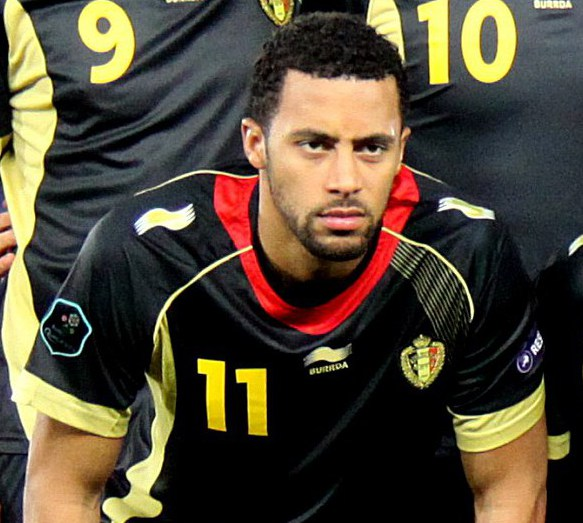
- Dembélé with Belgium in 2011

Personal information
- Full name: Moussa Sidi Yaya Dembélé
- Date of birth: 16 July 1987 (age 39)
- Place of birth: Antwerp, Belgium
- Height: 1.85 m (6 ft 1 in)
- Position: Midfielder

Youth career
- 2003–2004: Germinal Beerschot

Senior career*
Years	Team	Apps	(Gls)
2004–2005	Germinal Beerschot	20	(1)
2005–2006	Willem II	33	(9)
2006–2010	AZ	118	(24)
2010–2012	Fulham	62	(5)
2012–2019	Tottenham Hotspur	181	(7)
2019–2022	Guangzhou City	47	(1)
Total		461	(47)

International career
2002–2003	Belgium U16	3	(0)
2003–2004	Belgium U17	6	(1)
2004	Belgium U18	1	(1)
2004–2006	Belgium U19	10	(2)
2006–2018	Belgium	82	(5)
Medal record
Men's football
Representing Belgium
FIFA World Cup
Third place	2018 Russia
- * Club domestic league appearances and goals

Moussa Sidi Yaya Dembélé (born 16 July 1987), known as Mousa Dembélé, is a Belgian former professional footballer who played as a midfielder.

Dembélé started his career at Belgian Pro League team Germinal Beerschot before spells at Eredivisie sides Willem II and AZ in the Netherlands. He won the league title and the Johan Cruyff Shield with the latter in 2009. Dembélé transferred to Premier League side Fulham in 2010 before joining Tottenham Hotspur for a fee of £15 million in August 2012. He was ranked 91st in The Guardian's list of the 100 best current footballers in 2012.

Dembélé's skills in midfield have led to him being described by former teammates and other professional footballers as having some of the best ball control and dribbling skills of his era.

Dembélé accumulated 82 caps for the Belgium national team from 2006 to 2018.

== Early life ==
Dembélé was born in Wilrijk, Antwerp, Belgium. His father Yaya is Malian, while his mother, Tilly Huygens, is Belgian of Flemish ethnicity. Dembélé is a Muslim.

Dembélé uses the spelling "Mousa" for his first name (e.g. on his Twitter account), and so do his club, national team and most news articles about him. However, in a 2016 interview, he said that the proper spelling ought to be "Moussa". In a 2018 interview he further clarified that his first name was accidentally misspelled "Mousa" when he had to renew his passport one time and then just decided to keep on using it that way.

== Club career ==
=== Early career ===
Dembélé played for K. Berchem Sport as a youth. He started his professional career for Germinal Beerschot, a team in the Belgian Pro League. He made his debut on 24 April 2004 against Charleroi. In 2005, he signed for the youth section of Willem II, despite apparent interest from Eredivisie giants AFC Ajax.

=== Willem II ===
Dembélé spent the 2005–06 season in the Eredivisie with Willem II. The team had a very poor season that year, but Dembélé nonetheless scored nine times. After the season, he attracted further interest from the bigger Eredivisie teams and was subsequently transferred to AZ in the summer of 2006.

=== AZ ===
In 2006–07, Dembélé was one of the most important players of Louis van Gaal's team. They were poised to win the championship but on the last day lost the title to PSV and only finished third after losing 3–2 to Excelsior. AZ also lost the final of the KNVB Beker against AFC Ajax. Dembélé scored after two minutes played, but AZ lost 8–7 after a penalty shootout, with Dembélé scoring AZ's fifth penalty attempt. AZ further lost the play-off final for qualification to the Champions League, again to Ajax. Dembélé scored six times that season.

The season of 2007–08 was a very disappointing season for AZ. They finished 12th, with Dembélé scoring four times for them. The 2008–09 season started disappointingly as well for Dembélé's team after two defeats, but then AZ started to win more games and eventually won the championship. Dembélé was out injured from October until December with a knee injury, but on his return, he was hailed as being one of the players of the season in the Eredivisie.

=== Fulham ===
Dembélé was said to be "edging closer" to join English Premier League club Birmingham City, but on 12 August 2010, Dembélé declined a move to Birmingham in favour of London club Fulham. On 18 August 2010, Fulham announced that Dembélé had joined from AZ on a three-year deal for a fee of £5 million.

Dembélé made an excellent start to his career at Fulham. He made his début on 22 August 2010, coming on as a substitute against Manchester United. He capped his first start for the club with a goal, scoring the second of six goals against Port Vale in the League Cup on 25 August. The same week, Dembélé made his first league start against Blackpool in which he provided two assists. The first of the two was a cross to Bobby Zamora following a good run in the box, while the second gave Fulham a draw and a point; he dodged past a couple of Blackpool players before playing a good ball for an on-rushing Dickson Etuhu to make the score (and final result) 2–2. Dembélé scored two league goals against Wolverhampton Wanderers on 11 September in a 2–1 win, his first league goals for Fulham. He then scored a great solo goal against Tottenham Hotspur, running from the halfway line before powerfully placing his shot beyond goalkeeper Heurelho Gomes. This was voted the Fulham "Goal of the Season" by the Fulham fans.

It took until 9 May in Fulham's home game against Liverpool for Dembélé to score his third Premier League goal, but the Cottagers were soundly beaten 5–2.

Under manager Martin Jol, Dembélé played in a more creative position in central midfield, either next to club captain Danny Murphy or new signing Mahamadou Diarra. After some very good performances, Martin Jol confirmed the club had opened contract talks with Dembélé in order to fend off interest from other clubs. Dembélé scored two goals in 2011–12 in his new more central role, the first coming as an 86th-minute goal against Wigan Athletic to seal Fulham's 0–2 win at the DW Stadium in late October. His second came right at the business end of the season against Sunderland; his goal was the winner to make the result 2–1, scoring only 30 seconds after Phil Bardsley had equalized to make it 1–1 at Craven Cottage.

=== Tottenham Hotspur ===
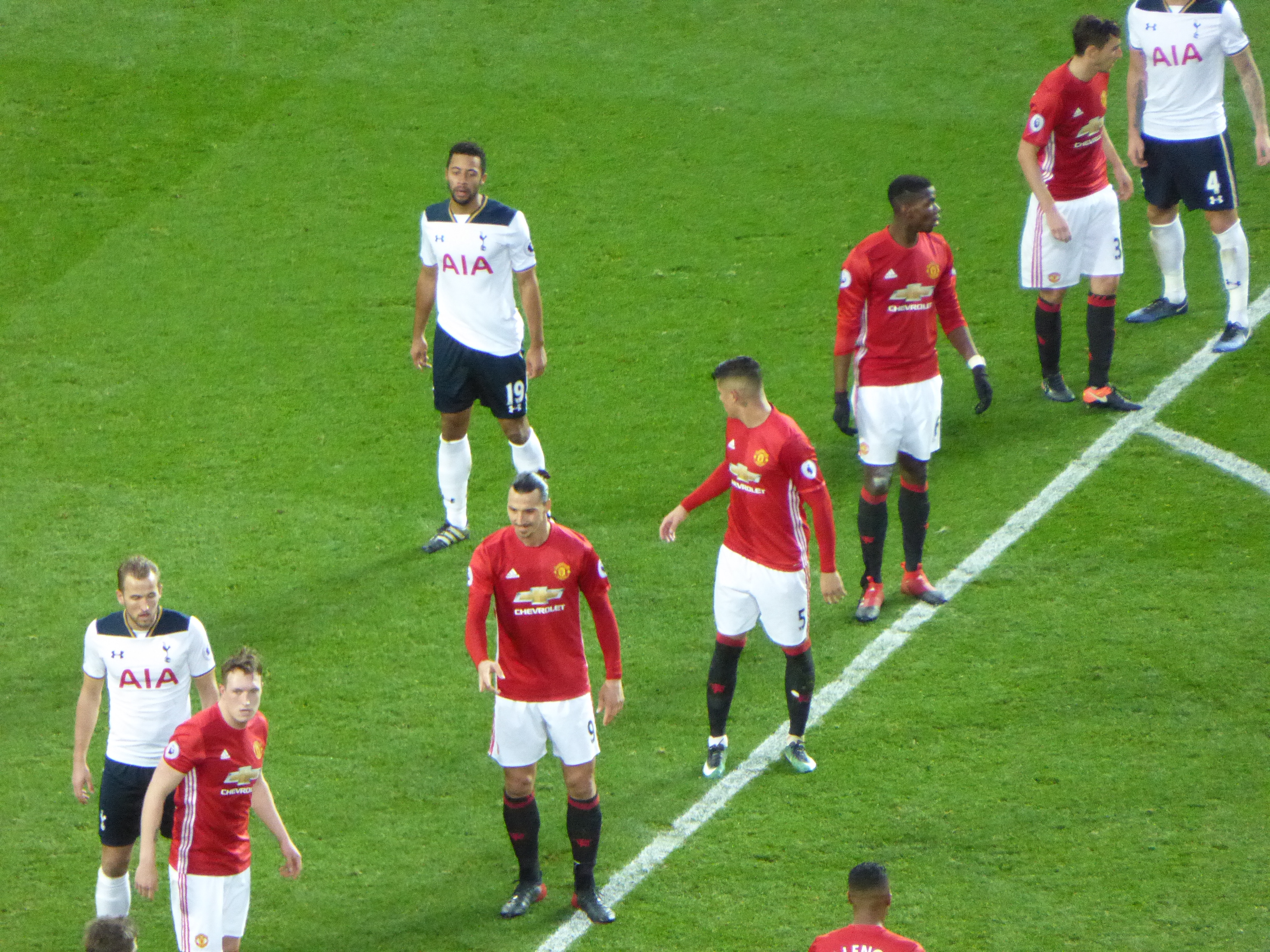
Dembélé playing for Spurs in 2016

Dembélé transferred to Tottenham Hotspur on 29 August 2012 after Spurs triggered a £15 million release clause in his Fulham contract. He scored on his debut against Norwich City on 1 September in a 1–1 home draw. On 21 February 2013, he scored a 90th-minute goal to help Spurs put Olympique Lyonnais out of the UEFA Europa League and qualify for the last 16 of the competition.

On 6 May 2016, Dembélé, despite not having been booked by the referee, was banned for six games by the Football Association for an eye gouge on Chelsea's Diego Costa. The FA stated that "the standard punishment of three matches which would otherwise apply to this offence was clearly insufficient."

Dembélé suffered from a recurring injury to his foot that caused him to miss a number of games in the 2016–17 season. Tottenham's manager Mauricio Pochettino nevertheless described Dembélé as a "genius" in April 2017, and among the best he had worked with, including Diego Maradona and Ronaldinho. Pochettino related that he had said to him: "If we had taken you at 18 or 19 years old, you would have become one of the best players in the world." He underwent surgery on his ankle in May 2017 but thought that he would never be 100% fit again. In the 2017–18 season, he again injured his ankle in the EFL Cup tie against Barnsley in September. However, he gained plaudits for his performances later in the season as a midfielder.

In early November in the 2018–19 season in the match against Wolverhampton Wanderers, he suffered an ankle ligament injury that would see him out of the squad for the rest of the year. This would be his last game for Tottenham as he was transferred in January after six and a half years at the club. In total, he made 250 appearances with 10 goals scored for the club.

=== Guangzhou R&F/Guangzhou City ===
In the January 2019 transfer window Tottenham agreed a deal to sell Dembélé to Chinese Super League club Beijing Guoan, but there were complications with the deal. Instead Dembélé was set to move to Guangzhou R&F, also of the Chinese Super League for a reported fee of £11 million. Dembélé joined Guangzhou R&F on 17 January 2019.

On 8 February 2022, Dembélé rejected a contract extension from Guangzhou to spend more time with his family and he retired at the end of the 2022 season.

== International career ==
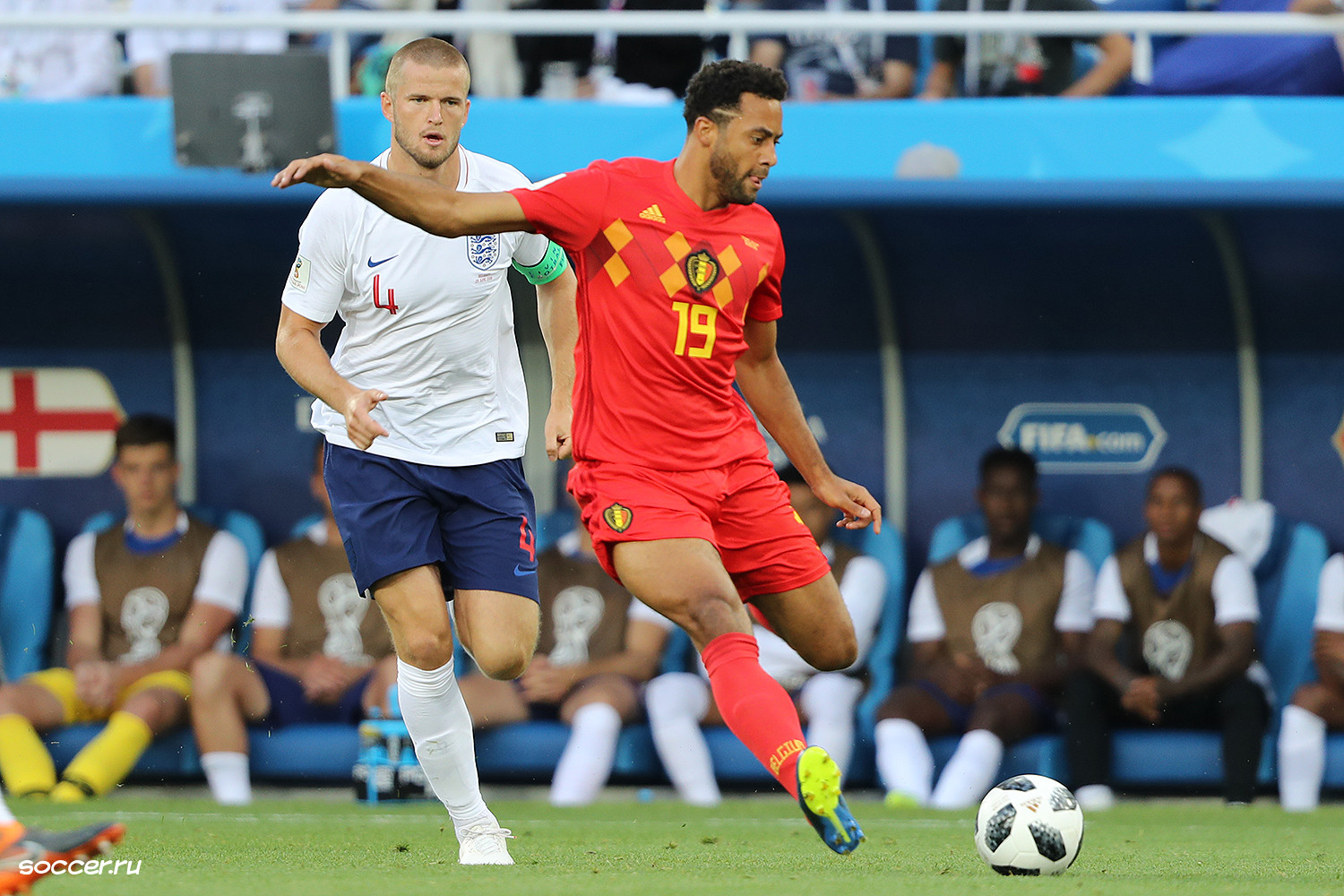
Dembélé in action during the 2018 FIFA World Cup

Dembélé made his first international appearance on 20 May 2006 against Slovakia, coming on as a substitute for Luigi Pieroni. He scored his first international goal in October 2006 against Azerbaijan. Dembélé participated in the 2008 Summer Olympics, where he put on a remarkable show, being instrumental in Belgium's 3–2 win to Italy in the quarter-finals, scoring two goals, including the defining goal of the match. Belgium then progressed, losing to Nigeria in the semi-finals and Brazil in the third place play-offs. Dembélé played in all six of Belgium's games at the Olympics.

On 13 May 2014, Dembélé was named in Belgium's squad for the 2014 FIFA World Cup. He played 65 minutes in midfield before being substituted with Marouane Fellaini in the team's first game of the tournament, a 2–1 win against Algeria in Belo Horizonte.

Dembélé announced his retirement from international football on 7 March 2019, after 82 caps for Belgium.

== Style of play and reception ==
"When Dembélé came to England in 2010, signed by Fulham, he was a striker; now he is a midfielder, albeit one hard to categorise. He is not a typical playmaker, nor a holding midfielder or box-to-box-player. He is not merely a Zola-esque technician or a pure Keane-esque tackler; he is all this combined and more."

— Bart Vlietstra, The Guardian (2018)

Dembélé began his career as a winger before playing as a centre-forward during his time at Willem II. Upon joining AZ Alkmaar in 2006, manager Louis van Gaal recognized that his exceptional ball retention was better suited for a deeper role, transitioning him into a playmaking number 10. Despite arriving at Fulham in 2010 as a striker, he was permanently repurposed into a central midfielder by manager Martin Jol. He has been described as a footballer who is "big, powerful, technically gifted" and who has excellent "dribbling and passing abilities." His teammates frequently characterized this unique blend of physical strength and elegance, with some describing him as a "ballerina" and others as a "tank". His manager at Fulham, Martin Jol, said "Dembélé is probably the best player on the ball I've ever seen." Former Tottenham midfielder turned media pundit, Jermaine Jenas, praised his "passing ability", remarking that the Belgian is "very good technically", while also comparing him to a vacuum cleaner insofar as he "sucks in all the pressure and then releases the ball at the perfect time. If you try to get tight to him, he is strong enough to hold you off and has the ability to look at you and go past you in the blink of an eye. If you drop off him, he is happy too. He can sit deep in front of the back four and dictate the tempo from there". Jenas further added, "I can understand why Spurs boss Mauricio Pochettino praises him so much because, with Dembele in the team, the game goes as fast or as slow as he wants it to."

"For me, in a 5-a-side, he's the best player in the world. So strong on the ball, you can never take it off him. Offensively and defensively [he's] one of the best."

— Kevin De Bruyne

Dembélé was highly praised by both peers and managers for his ball retention, dribbling abilities, and game control. In March 2016, his exceptional all-around midfield play was recognized by the CIES, which ranked him as the best box-to-box midfielder in Europe's top five leagues, placing him ahead of notable players such as Blaise Matuidi, İlkay Gündoğan, and Paul Pogba. This ranking evaluated players based on six performance indicators: rigour, recovery, distribution, take-on, chance creation, and shooting. This capacity to retain possession under pressure and dictate play was firmly supported by statistics; during the 2017–18 season, he recorded an 88% success rate in dribbles and a 91.3% pass completion rate in the opposition half, the highest among regular Premier League midfielders. Dembélé's uniqueness was further demonstrated by his balanced output, as he was the only player to rank among the top 20 in the league for both tackles and dribbles over a three-season period.

Dembélé was frequently praised by pundits, players, and coaches for his technical ability, while also being described as an underrated footballer. In 2017, ESPN argued that Dembélé was widely regarded as an underrated player because, despite being highly rated by teammates and managers, his influence on the pitch was not easily measured by conventional statistics such as goals and assists, and he often received less public attention than teammates such as Harry Kane and Dele Alli. In 2024, talkSPORT referred to Dembélé as "one of the most underrated players in Premier League history". Former Belgium teammate Eden Hazard also named Dembélé as the most underrated teammate of his career, stating that he was among the best midfielders of his generation despite receiving relatively little public recognition. Manchester City full-back Kyle Walker, who played alongside Dembélé at Tottenham Hotspur, described him as "probably the best player I've ever seen in football."

Dembélé has stated Dutch forward Patrick Kluivert was a childhood hero of his and that his style of play was compared to Kluivert's.

== Career statistics ==
=== Club ===
Appearances and goals by club, season and competition
Club	Season	League			National cup (Note: Includes Belgian Cup, KNVB Cup, FA Cup)		League cup (Note: Includes Football League/EFL Cup)		Europe		Other		Total	
Club	Season	Division	Apps	Goals	Apps	Goals	Apps	Goals	Apps	Goals	Apps	Goals	Apps	Goals
Germinal Beerschot	2003–04	Belgian First Division	1	0	0	0	–		–		–		1	0
Germinal Beerschot	2004–05	Belgian First Division	19	1	3	1	–		–		–		22	2
Germinal Beerschot	Total		20	1	3	1	–		–		–		23	2
Willem II	2005–06	Eredivisie	33	9	1	0	–		2 (Note: Appearances in UEFA Cup)	0	3 (Note: Appearances in Eredivisie relegation play-offs)	1	39	10
AZ	2006–07	Eredivisie	33	6	5	4	–		12	4	2 (Note: Appearances in Eredivisie European qualification play-offs)	0	52	14
AZ	2007–08	Eredivisie	33	4	1	0	–		6	1	–		40	5
AZ	2008–09	Eredivisie	23	10	3	2	–		–		2	0	28	12
AZ	2009–10	Eredivisie	29	4	1	2	–		6 (Note: Appearances in UEFA Champions League)	0	4 (Note: One appearance in Johan Cruyff Shield, three appearances in Eredivisie European qualification play-offs)	0	40	6
AZ	Total		118	24	10	8	–		24	5	8	0	160	37
Fulham	2010–11	Premier League	24	3	2	1	2	1	–		–		28	5
Fulham	2011–12	Premier League	36	2	1	0	1	0	7 (Note: Appearances in UEFA Europa League)	0	–		45	2
Fulham	2012–13	Premier League	2	0	—		—		–		–		2	0
Fulham	Total		62	5	3	1	3	1	7	0	–		75	7
Tottenham Hotspur	2012–13	Premier League	30	1	2	0	0	0	10	1	–		42	2
Tottenham Hotspur	2013–14	Premier League	28	1	1	0	3	0	9	1	–		41	2
Tottenham Hotspur	2014–15	Premier League	26	1	2	0	5	0	7	0	–		40	1
Tottenham Hotspur	2015–16	Premier League	29	3	2	0	0	0	4	1	–		35	4
Tottenham Hotspur	2016–17	Premier League	30	1	3	0	0	0	6 (Note: Four appearances in UEFA Champions League, two appearances in UEFA Europa League)	0	–		39	1
Tottenham Hotspur	2017–18	Premier League	28	0	4	0	2	0	6	0	–		40	0
Tottenham Hotspur	2018–19	Premier League	10	0	0	0	1	0	2	0	–		13	0
Tottenham Hotspur	Total		181	7	14	0	11	0	44	3	–		250	10
Guangzhou City	2019	Chinese Super League	26	1	0	0	–		–		–		26	1
Guangzhou City	2020	Chinese Super League	13	0	0	0	–		–		–		13	0
Guangzhou City	2021	Chinese Super League	8	0	0	0	–		–		–		8	0
Guangzhou City	Total		47	1	0	0	–		–		–		47	1
Career total			461	47	31	10	14	1	77	8	11	1	594	67

=== International ===
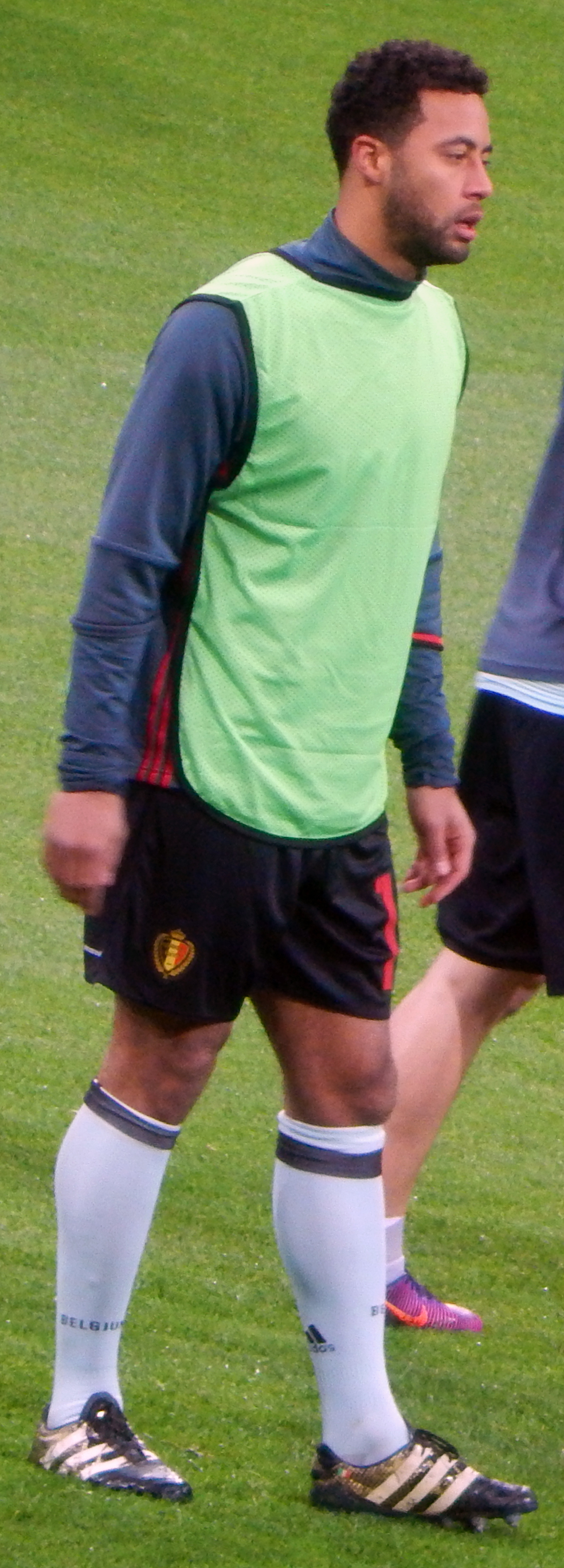
Dembélé warming up on international duty in 2017

Appearances and goals by national team and year
National team	Year	Apps	Goals
Belgium	2006	6	1
Belgium	2007	7	3
Belgium	2008	4	0
Belgium	2009	9	1
Belgium	2010	5	0
Belgium	2011	6	0
Belgium	2012	7	0
Belgium	2013	11	0
Belgium	2014	6	0
Belgium	2015	1	0
Belgium	2016	5	0
Belgium	2017	6	0
Belgium	2018	9	0
Total		82	5

Scores and results list Belgium's goal tally first

List of international goals scored by Mousa Dembélé
No.	Date	Venue	Opponent	Score	Result	Competition
1.	11 October 2006	Constant Vanden Stock Stadium, Brussels, Belgium	Azerbaijan	3–0	3–0	UEFA Euro 2008 qualifying
2.	22 August 2007	King Baudouin Stadium, Brussels, Belgium	Serbia	1–0	3–2	UEFA Euro 2008 qualifying
3.	22 August 2007	King Baudouin Stadium, Brussels, Belgium	Serbia	3–1	3–2	UEFA Euro 2008 qualifying
4.	17 October 2007	King Baudouin Stadium, Brussels, Belgium	Armenia	2–0	3–0	UEFA Euro 2008 qualifying
5.	28 March 2009	Cristal Arena, Genk, Belgium	Bosnia and Herzegovina	1–1	2–4	2010 FIFA World Cup qualification

== Honours ==
AZ

- Eredivisie: 2008–09
- Johan Cruyff Shield: 2009

Tottenham Hotspur

- Football League Cup runner-up: 2014–15

Belgium

- FIFA World Cup third place: 2018

=== Individual ===
- AZ Alkmaar Player of the Year (selected by club sponsors): 2007
- Voetbal International Team of the Year: 2009
