= Dia Saba =

Israeli footballer (born 1992)

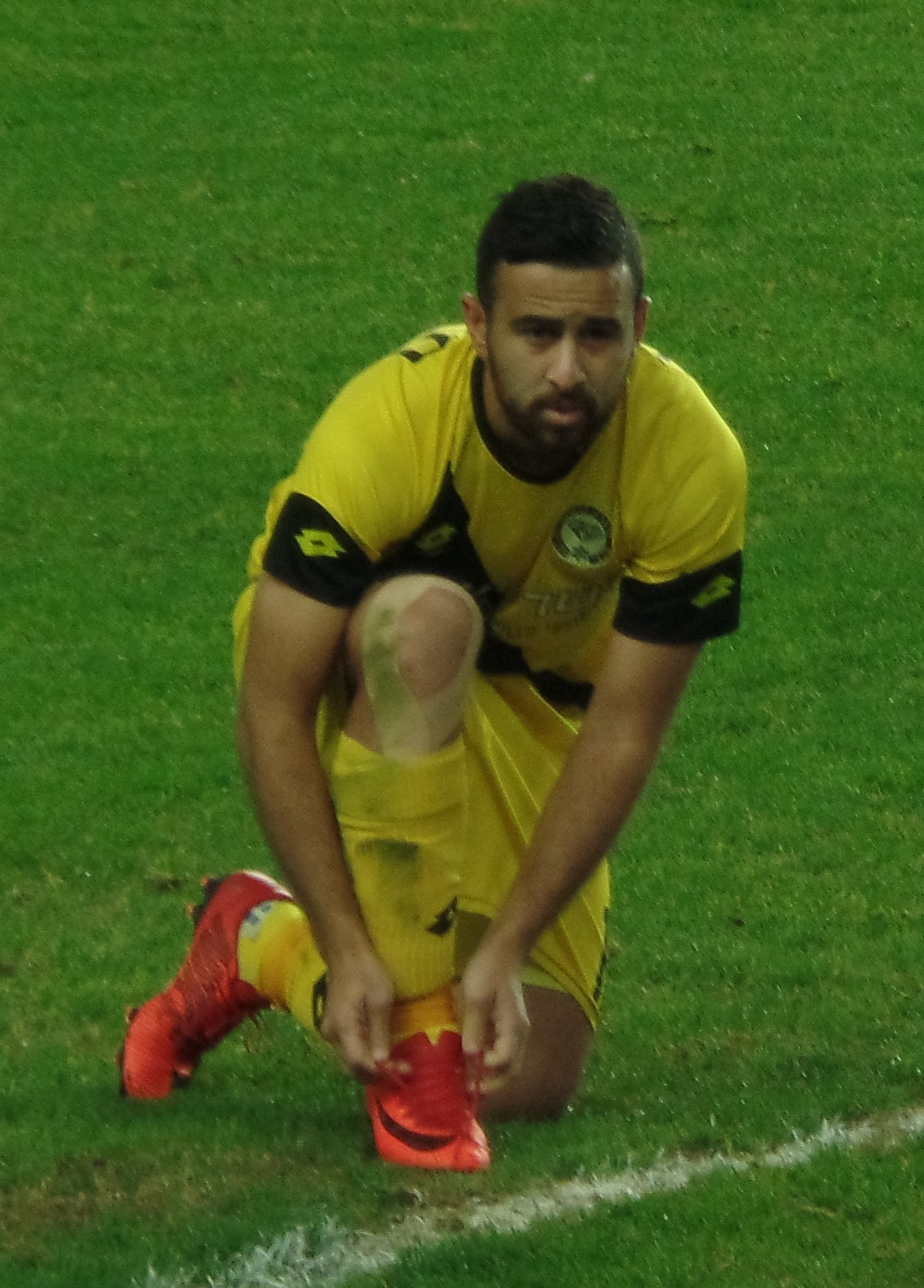
- Saba playing for Maccabi Netanya in 2015

Personal information
- Date of birth: 18 November 1992 (age 33)
- Place of birth: Majd al-Krum, Israel
- Height: 1.68 m (5 ft 6 in)
- Position: Attacking midfielder

Team information
- Current team: Amedspor
- Number: 91

Youth career
- Hapoel Haifa
- Beitar Nes Tubruk

Senior career*
Years	Team	Apps	(Gls)
2009–2011	Beitar Nes Tubruk	2	(1)
2011–2013	Maccabi Tel Aviv	2	(0)
2012–2013	→ Hapoel Be'er Sheva (loan)	30	(3)
2013	→ Bnei Sakhnin (loan)	10	(0)
2013–2014	Maccabi Petah Tikva	29	(3)
2014–2018	Maccabi Netanya	100	(45)
2018–2019	Hapoel Be'er Sheva	16	(4)
2019–2020	Guangzhou R&F	36	(18)
2020–2022	Al-Nasr	49	(17)
2022–2023	Sivasspor	13	(5)
2023–2025	Maccabi Haifa	53	(25)
2024	→ Emirates Club (loan)	7	(2)
2025–	Amedspor	39	(11)

International career
2011	Israel U19	4	(0)
2013–2014	Israel U21	9	(2)
2018–2026	Israel	13	(3)
- * Club domestic league appearances and goals as of 16 August 2026

Dia Saba (sometimes Sabi'a or Seba, Arabic: ضياء سبع, Hebrew: דיא סבע; born 18 November 1992) is an Israeli professional footballer who plays as an attacking midfielder for Süper Lig club Amedspor.

== Early life ==
Saba was born in Majd al-Krum, Israel, to a Muslim-Arab family. He is a cousin of former footballer Ahmad Saba'a.

== Club career ==
Saba began his career with the youth selections of Hapoel Haifa, and later moved to Beitar Nes Tubruk. In summer 2011, Saba joined Maccabi Tel Aviv and played under manager Motti Ivanir. However, he made only two appearances over four months, and in January 2012 was subsequently loaned to Hapoel Be'er Sheva until the end of the season. On 21 January 2012, Saba made his debut for Hapoel Be'er Sheva, and scored twice in a 2–0 victory over Hapoel Haifa, helping the club to stay in the league. He was then again loaned for half the season. In February 2013 he moved to Bnei Sakhnin, playing ten league matches and failing to score. Before the 2013–14 season, Saba signed with Maccabi Petah Tikva. The following season he signed a two-year contract with Maccabi Netanya. He played with Netanya for four years, scoring 51 goals in 114 appearances in all club competitions, including 24 league goals in the 2017–18 season.

On 17 September 2018, Saba returned to Be'er Sheva as Hapoel paid Maccabi Netanya a record transfer fee of €2 million. He signed a four-year contract with Be'er Sheva worth €1.6 million. He made his debut at home against Bnei Yehuda, in a goalless game. Saba scored his first goal for Be'er Sheva on 6 October 2018, in a 4–1 win over Maccabi Petah Tikva.

In January 2019, he moved to Chinese Super League side Guangzhou R&F, linking up with fellow Israel national team striker Eran Zahavi.

In September 2020, Saba joined Al-Nasr, becoming the first Israeli to play in the United Arab Emirates following the Israel–United Arab Emirates normalization agreement.

On 22 August 2022, Saba joined Turkish Süper Lig club Sivasspor.

On 30 January 2023, Saba signed a three-and-a-half-year contract with Maccabi Haifa.

== Career statistics ==
=== Club ===
As of 15 March 2025

Appearances and goals by club, season and competition
Club	Season	League			National cup		League cup		Continental		Total	
Club	Season	Division	Apps	Goals	Apps	Goals	Apps	Goals	Apps	Goals	Apps	Goals
Maccabi Tel Aviv	2011–12	Israeli Premier League	2	0	0	0	2	0	0	0	4	0
Hapoel Be'er Sheva (loan)	2011–12	Israeli Premier League	15	3	2	0	0	0	—		17	3
Hapoel Be'er Sheva (loan)	2012–13	Israeli Premier League	15	0	1	0	4	1	—		20	1
Hapoel Be'er Sheva (loan)	Total		30	3	3	0	4	1	0	0	37	4
Bnei Sakhnin (loan)	2012–13	Israeli Premier League	10	0	2	1	0	0	—		12	1
Maccabi Petah Tikva	2013–14	Israeli Premier League	29	3	4	5	0	0	—		33	8
Maccabi Netanya	2014–15	Israeli Premier League	29	4	0	0	2	0	—		31	4
Maccabi Netanya	2015–16	Israeli Premier League	3	0	0	0	0	0	—		3	0
Maccabi Netanya	2016–17	Liga Leumit	32	17	1	0	3	0	—		36	17
Maccabi Netanya	2017–18	Israeli Premier League	34	24	2	1	2	1	0	0	38	26
Maccabi Netanya	2018–19	Israeli Premier League	2	0	0	0	4	4	0	0	6	4
Maccabi Netanya	Total		100	45	3	1	11	5	0	0	114	51
Hapoel Be'er Sheva	2018–19	Israeli Premier League	16	4	2	1	0	0	—		18	5
Guangzhou R&F	2019	Chinese Super League	26	13	0	0	—		—		26	13
Guangzhou R&F	2020	Chinese Super League	10	5	1	0	—		—		11	5
Guangzhou R&F	Total		36	18	1	0	0	0	0	0	37	18
Al-Nasr	2020–21	UAE Pro League	24	6	—		5	1	—		29	7
Al-Nasr	2021–22	UAE Pro League	25	11	—		4	2	—		29	13
Al-Nasr	Total		49	17	0	0	9	3	0	0	58	20
Sivasspor	2022–23	Süper Lig	13	5	1	0	—		6	1	20	6
Maccabi Haifa	2022–23	Israeli Premier League	16	6	1	1	0	0	—		17	7
Maccabi Haifa	2023–24	Israeli Premier League	3	2	0	0	1	0	10	2	14	4
Maccabi Haifa	2024–25	Israeli Premier League	23	15	2	0	3	3	2	0	30	18
Maccabi Haifa	Total		42	23	3	1	4	3	12	2	61	29
Emirates (loan)	2023–24	UAE Pro League	7	2	0	0	—		0	0	7	2
Career total			334	120	19	9	30	12	18	3	401	144

=== International ===
Scores and results list Israel's goal tally first, score column indicates score after each Saba goal.

List of international goals scored by Dia Saba
No.	Date	Venue	Opponent	Score	Result	Competition
1	14 October 2018	Turner Stadium, Be'er Sheva, Israel	Albania	2–0	2–0	2018–19 UEFA Nations League C
2	15 November 2018	Netanya Stadium, Netanya, Israel	Guatemala	5–0	7–0	Friendly
3	15 November 2018	Netanya Stadium, Netanya, Israel	Guatemala	6–0	7–0	Friendly

== Honours ==
Maccabi Netanya

- Liga Leumit: 2016–17

Maccabi Haifa

- Israeli Premier League: 2022–23
- Israel Super Cup: 2023

Individual

- Israel Football Players Organization's Player of the Season: 2017–18
- Israeli Premier League top scorer: 2017–18 (24 goals)
