= Jin Bo =

Chinese footballer

Jin Bo 김파 金波
Personal information
- Date of birth: 20 January 1993 (age 33)
- Place of birth: Helong, Jilin, China
- Height: 1.76 m (5 ft 9 in)
- Positions: Midfielder; forward

Youth career
- Yanbian FC
- 2011–2012: → Casa Pia (loan)

Senior career*
Years	Team	Apps	(Gls)
2012–2013	Fátima	0	(0)
2013–2018	Yanbian FC	116	(9)
2019–2022	Guangzhou City	15	(0)
2021	→ Zibo Cuju (Loan)	11	(0)
- * Club domestic league appearances and goals as of 31 December 2022

Jin Bo
- Simplified Chinese: 金波
Transcriptions
Standard Mandarin
- Hanyu Pinyin: Jīn Bō
- IPA: [tɕín.pwó]

Chinese Korean name
- Chosŏn'gŭl: 김파
Transcriptions
- Revised Romanization: Gim Pa
- McCune–Reischauer: Kim P'a

Jin Bo (Chinese: 金波; Korean: 김파; born 20 January 1993) is a Chinese former professional footballer who played as midfielder or forward.

== Career ==
Jin Bo was born in Helong, Yanbian. He went to Portugal following the Chinese Football Association 500.com Stars Project and joined Casa Pia youth team system in December 2011. He joined Segunda Divisão side Fátima in the summer of 2012. Jin returned to China in 2013 and was promoted to China League One side Yanbian FC's first team squad. He made his senior debut on 20 April 2013 in a 0–0 draw against Shenyang Shenbei. On 30 May 2015, he scored his first senior goal in a 2–0 home win over Dalian Aerbin. Jin scored two goals in 24 league appearances in the 2015 season, as Yanbian won the title of the league and promoted to the Chinese Super League. On 8 April 2016, he made his Super League debut in a 0–0 draw against Guangzhou R&F, coming on as a substitute for Sun Jun in the 77th minute.

On 5 February 2019, Jin transferred to Chinese Super League side Guangzhou R&F (now known as Guangzhou City). He would make his debut on 1 May 2019 in a Chinese FA Cup game to third tier club Taizhou Yuanda F.C. that ended in a 1-0 defeat. After the game he would struggle to establish himself as a regular within the team and on 12 July 2021 he would be loan out second tier club Zibo Cuju for the 2021 China League One campaign.

== Career statistics ==
As of match played 31 December 2022

Appearances and goals by club, season and competition
Club	Season	League			National cup		Continental		Other		Total	
Club	Season	Division	Apps	Goals	Apps	Goals	Apps	Goals	Apps	Goals	Apps	Goals
Fátima	2012–13	Segunda Divisão	0	0	0	0	–		–		0	0
Yanbian FC	2013	China League One	16	0	0	0	–		–		16	0
Yanbian FC	2014	China League One	6	0	1	0	–		–		7	0
Yanbian FC	2015	China League One	24	2	2	0	–		–		26	2
Yanbian FC	2016	Chinese Super League	22	4	1	0	–		–		23	4
Yanbian FC	2017	Chinese Super League	22	2	1	0	–		–		23	2
Yanbian FC	2018	China League One	26	1	1	0	–		–		27	1
Yanbian FC	Total		116	9	6	0	0	0	0	0	122	9
Guangzhou R&F/ Guangzhou City	2019	Chinese Super League	4	0	1	0	–		–		5	0
Guangzhou R&F/ Guangzhou City	2020	Chinese Super League	2	0	0	0	–		–		2	0
Guangzhou R&F/ Guangzhou City	2021	Chinese Super League	0	0	0	0	–		–		0	0
Guangzhou R&F/ Guangzhou City	2022	Chinese Super League	9	0	0	0	–		–		9	0
Guangzhou R&F/ Guangzhou City	Total		15	0	1	0	0	0	0	0	16	0
Zibo Cuju (Loan)	2021	China League One	11	0	0	0	–		–		11	0
Career total			142	9	7	0	0	0	0	0	149	9

== Honours ==
Yanbian FC

- China League One: 2015.
