= Wang Peng (footballer, born 1997) =

Chinese footballer

Wang Peng 王鹏
Personal information
- Date of birth: 16 November 1997 (age 28)
- Place of birth: Guangzhou, Guangdong, China
- Height: 1.76 m (5 ft 9 in)
- Position: Midfielder

Youth career
- Guangdong Youth
- 2014–2015: Porto
- 2016–2017: Gondomar

Senior career*
Years	Team	Apps	(Gls)
2016–2017	Gondomar B	25	(7)
2017–2018	Gondomar	11	(1)
2018	→ Guangzhou R&F (loan)	1	(0)
2019–2022	Guangzhou City	37	(1)
2021	→ Xinjiang Tianshan Leopard (loan)	21	(0)
2023	Guangzhou E-Power		
2024	Ganzhou Ruishi	16	(0)

International career^{‡}
2015	China U20	1	(0)
- * Club domestic league appearances and goals as of 19 January 2023 ‡ National team caps and goals as of 5 June 2015

Wang Peng (Chinese: 王鹏; pinyin: Wáng Péng; born 16 November 1997) is a Chinese professional footballer who plays as a midfielder. He is the son of Chinese former international Wang Huiliang.

== Club career ==
Wang Peng would go abroad to further his football development and play for the Portuguese club Gondomar's youth team. He would be promoted to the Gondomar B team who were allowed to participate within the Portuguese football pyramid before joining their senior team. Wang would make his debut for the senior team in a league game on 14 May 2017 against Gouveia in a 2–1 defeat. On 30 September 2017, he scored his first goal for the club in a 1–1 draw against Felgueiras 1932.

In July 2018, Wang was loaned to Chinese Super League side Guangzhou R&F (now known as Guangzhou City). On 18 August 2018, he made his debut for the club in a 5–2 home win over Changchun Yatai, coming on as a substitute for Zhang Jiajie in the 89th minute. The following season he would permanently move to Guangzhou and go on to establish himself as a regular within the team, however in the next campaign the Head coach Giovanni van Bronckhorst would only give Wang two appearances throughout the season and on 5 July 2021 he was loaned out to second-tier club Xinjiang Tianshan Leopard.

== Career statistics ==
As of 31 December 2022.

Appearances and goals by club, season and competition
Club	Season	League			National Cup		Continental		Other		Total	
Club	Season	Division	Apps	Goals	Apps	Goals	Apps	Goals	Apps	Goals	Apps	Goals
Gondomar B	2015–16	Porto FA Second Division	10	6	-		-		-		10	6
Gondomar B	2016–17	Porto FA Division of Elite	15	1	-		-		-		15	1
Gondomar B	Total		25	7	0	0	0	0	0	0	25	7
Gondomar	2016–17	Campeonato de Portugal	1	0	0	0	-		-		1	0
Gondomar	2017–18	Campeonato de Portugal	10	1	1	0	-		-		11	1
Gondomar	Total		11	1	1	0	0	0	0	0	12	1
Guangzhou R&F (loan)	2018	Chinese Super League	1	0	1	0	-		-		2	0
Guangzhou R&F/ Guangzhou City	2019	Chinese Super League	18	0	1	0	-		-		19	0
Guangzhou R&F/ Guangzhou City	2020	Chinese Super League	1	0	1	0	-		-		2	0
Guangzhou R&F/ Guangzhou City	2021	Chinese Super League	0	0	0	0	-		-		0	0
Guangzhou R&F/ Guangzhou City	2022	Chinese Super League	18	1	1	0	-		-		19	1
Guangzhou R&F/ Guangzhou City	Total		37	1	3	0	0	0	0	0	40	1
Xinjiang Tianshan Leopard (loan)	2021	China League One	21	0	0	0	-		-		21	0
Career total			95	9	5	0	0	0	0	0	100	9
