= Gui Hong =

Chinese footballer (born 1995)

Gui Hong 桂宏
Personal information
- Date of birth: 18 January 1995 (age 31)
- Place of birth: Wuhan, Hubei, China
- Height: 1.85 m (6 ft 1 in)
- Position: Forward

Youth career
- Wuhan Zall
- 2013: Huracán Valencia
- 2014: Sevilla
- 2015: Hebei China Fortune

Senior career*
Years	Team	Apps	(Gls)
2014–2015	Sevilla C	3	(0)
2015	→ Utrera (loan)	16	(2)
2016–2018	Hebei China Fortune	26	(2)
2019–2022	Guangzhou City	39	(5)
2020	→ Guizhou Hengfeng (loan)	11	(4)
2021	→ Meizhou Hakka (loan)	13	(1)
2023	Nantong Zhiyun	17	(0)
2024	Shijiazhuang Gongfu	7	(0)
2024	Wuxi Wugo	3	(0)

International career^{‡}
2014	China U-19	8	(1)
2016	China U-23	4	(2)
- * Club domestic league appearances and goals as of 28 January 2024 ‡ National team caps and goals as of 10 November 2016

Gui Hong (Chinese: 桂宏; pinyin: Guì Hóng; born 18 January 1995) is a Chinese footballer.

== Club career ==
Gui Hong moved to Spain for trial in 2012 after he refused to sign a professional contract with Wuhan Zall. He was signed by Huracán Valencia in 2013 when he was 18 years old and transferred to Sevilla's youth academy in January 2014. He was promoted to Sevilla C in the summer of 2014 for the 2014–15 Tercera División campaign. In January 2015, Gui was loaned to Primera Andaluza side Utrera for half season. He scored his first goal in his first appearance, in a 3–0 victory against CD Ciudad Jardín Comunicaciones. Gui scored two goals in 16 appearances, as Utrera finished the second place of the league and won promotion to the Tercera División.

Gui returned to China and joined China League One side Hebei China Fortune in July 2015. He was promoted to the first team by Li Tie after Hebei promoted to the Chinese Super League in 2016. On 10 May 2016, he made his debut for Hebei in a 1–0 victory against amateur team Shanghai Jiading Boo King in the 2016 Chinese FA Cup, coming on for Wang Yang in the 60th minute. His Super League debut came on 4 days later in a 2–0 away defeat against Guangzhou Evergrande, coming on as a substitute for Li Hang in the 80th minute. On 29 June 2016, he scored his first goal for Hebei in the fourth round of 2016 Chinese FA Cup, which ensured Hebei beat Heibei Derby rival Shijiazhuang Ever Bright 3–2 and advanced to the next round. On 20 May 2017, Gui scored his first goal in the Super League in his first match of the 2017 season against Liaoning FC, which gave Hebei China Fortune a 2–0 home win. On 7 April 2018, he scored another goal in a 2–1 home win over Changchun Yatai.

On 24 January 2019, Gui signed a four-year contract with fellow Super League club Guangzhou R&F (now known as Guangzhou City). He would go on to make his debut in a league game on 2 March 2019 against Chongqing Dangdai Lifan that ended in a 2-2 draw. By the end of the season he would only make 13 appearances and would be loaned out to second tier club Guizhou Hengfeng on 20 May 2020. This would be followed by another loan period, with another second tier club in Meizhou Hakka where he was a squad player as the club gained promotion to the top tier after coming second within the division at the end of the 2021 China League One campaign.

== Career statistics ==
As of 31 December 2022.

Appearances and goals by club, season and competition
Club	Season	League			National Cup		Continental		Other		Total	
Club	Season	Division	Apps	Goals	Apps	Goals	Apps	Goals	Apps	Goals	Apps	Goals
Sevilla C	2014–15	Tercera División	3	0	-		-		-		3	0
Utrera (loan)	2014–15	Primera Andaluza	16	2	-		-		-		16	2
Hebei China Fortune	2016	Chinese Super League	8	0	4	1	-		-		12	1
Hebei China Fortune	2017	Chinese Super League	9	1	0	0	-		-		9	1
Hebei China Fortune	2018	Chinese Super League	9	1	1	0	-		-		10	1
Hebei China Fortune	Total		26	2	5	1	0	0	0	0	31	3
Guangzhou R&F/ Guangzhou City	2019	Chinese Super League	13	2	1	0	-		-		14	2
Guangzhou R&F/ Guangzhou City	2022	Chinese Super League	26	3	0	0	-		-		26	3
Guangzhou R&F/ Guangzhou City	Total		39	5	1	0	0	0	0	0	40	5
Guizhou Hengfeng (loan)	2020	China League One	11	4	1	0	-		-		12	4
Meizhou Hakka (loan)	2021	China League One	13	1	1	0	-		-		14	1
Career total			108	14	8	1	0	0	0	0	116	15
