= Ye Chugui =

Chinese footballer

Ye Chugui 叶楚贵
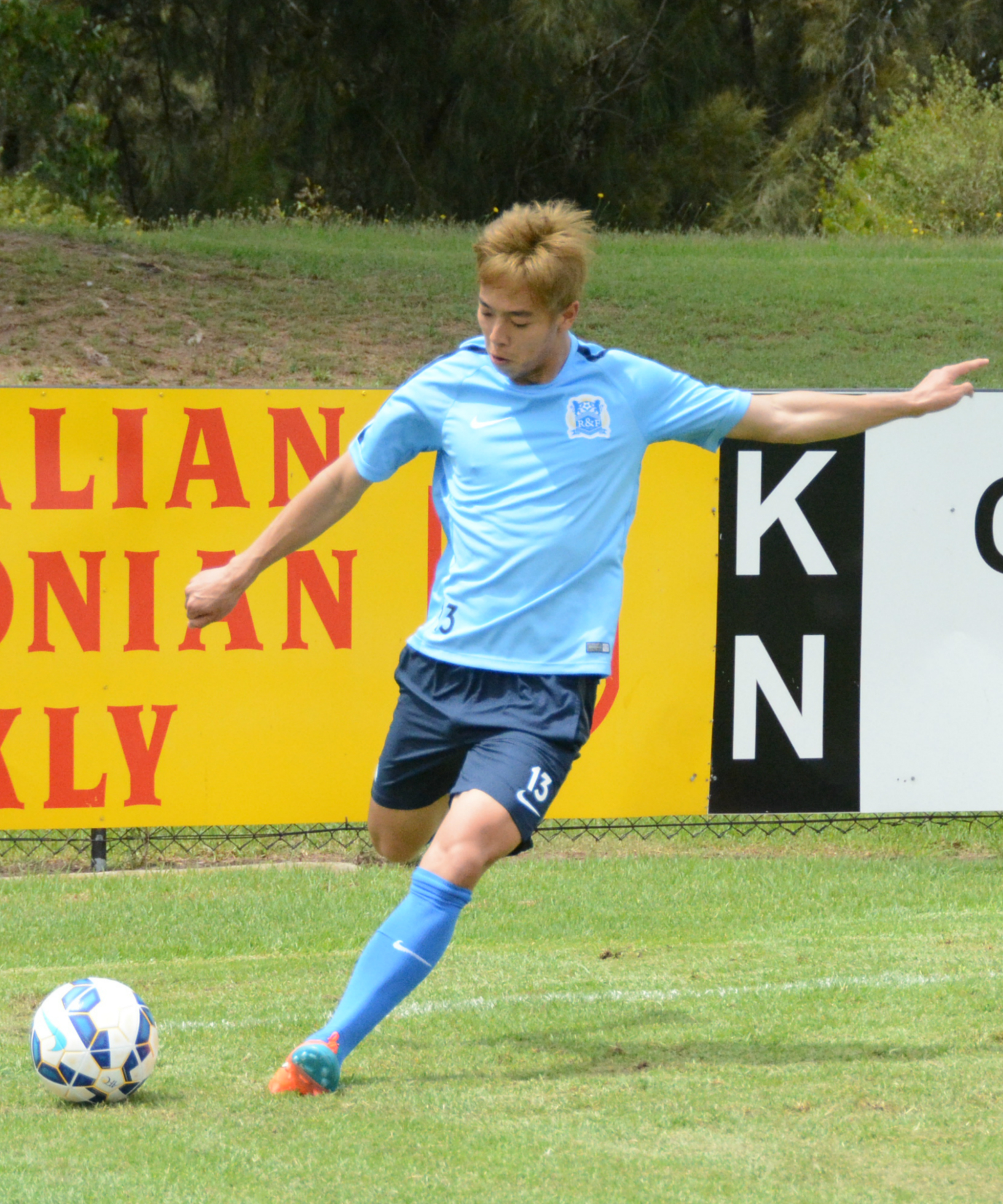

Personal information
- Date of birth: 8 September 1994 (age 32)
- Place of birth: Meixian, Guangdong, China
- Height: 1.78 m (5 ft 10 in)
- Position: Midfielder

Team information
- Current team: Yunnan Yukun
- Number: 7

Youth career
- 2004–2010: Dongguan Nancheng

Senior career*
Years	Team	Apps	(Gls)
2011–2014	Meixian Hakka	56	(14)
2015–2022	Guangzhou City	106	(15)
2018	→ Shenzhen FC (loan)	27	(4)
2023–2024	Meizhou Hakka	56	(5)
2025–	Yunnan Yukun	52	(3)
- * Club domestic league appearances and goals as of 19 November 2026

Ye Chugui
- Simplified Chinese: 叶楚贵
Transcriptions
Standard Mandarin
- Hanyu Pinyin: Yè Chǔguì
- IPA: [jê ʈʂʰù kwêɪ]
Hakka
- Romanization: Yap^{6} Co^{3}gui^{4} Ya̍p Chhú-kui
Yue: Cantonese
- Jyutping: Jip6 Co2gwai3
- IPA: [jip̚˨ tsʰɔ˧˥ kʷɐj˧]

Ye Chugui (Chinese: 叶楚贵; pinyin: Yè Chǔguì; born September 8, 1994) is a Chinese football player who currently plays for Chinese Super League side Yunnan Yukun.

== Club career ==
Ye Chugui started his professional football career in 2011 when he was promoted to Dongguan Nancheng's squad for the 2011 China League Two campaign. He played 24 matches in his debut season as Dongguan Nancheng failed to promote to the second tier. Ye scored three goals in first five matches of 2012 season; however, he suffered a severe knee injury in May, ruling him out for the rest of the season. He followed the club to move to his hometown city Meizhou and rename themselves as Meixian Hakka in 2013. He scored 10 goals in 15 appearances in the 2014 season which made him the top goal scorer of China League Two.

On 9 December 2014, Ye transferred to Chinese Super League side Guangzhou R&F (now known as Guangzhou City). He made his Super League debut on 3 April 2015, in a 4–0 home victory against Guizhou Renhe, coming on as a substitute for Abderrazak Hamdallah in the 70th minute. He scored his first Super League goal on 26 April 2015, which ensured Guangzhou R&F beat Changchun Yatai 2–1. On 24 February 2018, Ye was loaned to second-tier side Shenzhen FC for the 2018 season.

On 19 January 2025, Ye joined Chinese Super League side Yunnan Yukun.

== Career statistics ==
=== Club statistics ===
As of 2 November 2024.

Appearances and goals by club, season and competition
Club	Season	League			National Cup		Continental		Other		Total	
Club	Season	Division	Apps	Goals	Apps	Goals	Apps	Goals	Apps	Goals	Apps	Goals
Meixian Hakka	2011	China League Two	24	0	-		-		-		24	0
Meixian Hakka	2012	China League Two	5	3	0	0	-		-		5	3
Meixian Hakka	2013	China League Two	12	1	1	0	-		-		13	1
Meixian Hakka	2014	China League Two	15	10	2	0	-		-		17	10
Meixian Hakka	Total		56	14	3	0	0	0	0	0	59	14
Guangzhou R&F/ Guangzhou City	2015	Chinese Super League	15	1	2	0	3	0	-		20	1
Guangzhou R&F/ Guangzhou City	2016	Chinese Super League	6	1	2	0	-		-		8	1
Guangzhou R&F/ Guangzhou City	2017	Chinese Super League	16	1	4	0	-		-		20	1
Guangzhou R&F/ Guangzhou City	2019	Chinese Super League	25	2	1	0	-		-		26	2
Guangzhou R&F/ Guangzhou City	2020	Chinese Super League	17	4	3	0	-		-		20	4
Guangzhou R&F/ Guangzhou City	2021	Chinese Super League	12	2	1	0	-		-		13	2
Guangzhou R&F/ Guangzhou City	2022	Chinese Super League	15	4	0	0	-		-		15	4
Guangzhou R&F/ Guangzhou City	Total		106	15	13	0	3	0	0	0	122	15
Shenzhen (loan)	2018	China League One	27	4	0	0	-		-		27	4
Meixian Hakka	2023	Chinese Super League	29	3	1	0	-		-		30	3
Meixian Hakka	2024	Chinese Super League	27	2	1	0	-		-		28	2
Meixian Hakka	Total		56	5	2	0	0	0	0	0	58	5
Total			245	38	18	0	3	0	0	0	266	38

== Honours ==
=== Individual ===
- China League Two top scorer: 2014
