= Wang Huapeng =

Chinese association football player

Personal information
- Date of birth: 5 August 1999 (age 27)
- Place of birth: Quzhou, Zhejiang, China
- Height: 1.81 m (5 ft 11 in)
- Position: Defender

Youth career
- –2016: Zhejiang Greentown
- 2017: Chengdu Qbao
- 2017–2018: Real Sociedad
- 2019–2020: Guangzhou R&F

Senior career*
Years	Team	Apps	(Gls)
2020–2021	Guangzhou R&F	21	(0)
2022	Chongqing Liangjiang Athletic	0	(0)
2022–2023	Changchun Yatai	18	(0)
2023–2024	Guangxi Pingguo Haliao	53	(0)
- * Club domestic league appearances and goals as of 14:01, 19 January 2024 (UTC)

Wang Huapeng (Chinese: 王华鹏; born 5 August 1999) is a Chinese footballer currently playing as a right-back.

== Club career ==
Wang Huapeng was promoted to the senior team of Guangzhou R&F within the 2020 Chinese Super League season and would make his debut in a league game on 16 August 2020 against Dalian Professional F.C. in a 1-0 victory.

== Career statistics ==
As of 31 December 2023.

Club	Season	League			Cup		Continental		Other		Total	
Club	Season	Division	Apps	Goals	Apps	Goals	Apps	Goals	Apps	Goals	Apps	Goals
Guangzhou R&F	2020	Chinese Super League	7	0	1	0	–		–		8	0
Guangzhou R&F	2021	Chinese Super League	14	0	1	0	–		–		15	0
Guangzhou R&F	Total		21	0	2	0	0	0	0	0	23	0
Changchun Yatai	2022	Chinese Super League	18	0	1	0	–		–		19	0
Guangxi Pingguo Haliao	2023	China League One	26	0	0	0	–		–		26	0
Career total			65	0	3	0	0	0	0	0	68	0
