= Zhang Gong (footballer) =

Chinese footballer (born 1992)

Zhang Gong 张功
Personal information
- Full name: Zhang Gong
- Date of birth: 10 April 1992 (age 34)
- Place of birth: Beijing, China
- Height: 1.82 m (5 ft 11 1/2 in)
- Positions: Midfielder; centre-back

Team information
- Current team: Chengdu Rongcheng
- Number: 4

Senior career*
Years	Team	Apps	(Gls)
2011–2014	Shenyang Zhongze	47	(4)
2016	Dalian Transcendence	25	(1)
2017–2023	Guangzhou City	93	(2)
2023–	Chengdu Rongcheng	0	(0)
- * Club domestic league appearances and goals as of 31 December 2022

Zhang Gong (Chinese: 张功; pinyin: Zhāng Gōng; Mandarin pronunciation: [ʈʂáŋ kʊ́ŋ]; born 10 April 1992) is a Chinese footballer who currently plays for Chengdu Rongcheng in the Chinese Super League.

== Club career ==
Zhang Gong started his professional football career in 2011 when he joined China League One side Shenyang Zhongze in 2011. He scored his first senior goal on 26 July 2014 in a 2–0 home victory against Beijing Institute of Technology. Zhang became an unattached player at the end of 2014 season after Shenyang Zhongze dissolved.

Zhang joined League One side Dalian Transcendence in March 2016. He made his debut for Dalian on 13 March 2016 in a 3–1 away victory against Shanghai Shenxin, coming on as a substitute for Quan Heng in the 66th minute. On 23 July 2016, he scored his first goal in the Dalian Derby which ensured Dalian Transcendence beat Dalian Yifang 2–1.

Zhang transferred to Chinese Super League side Guangzhou R&F (later renamed as Guangzhou City) on 19 November 2016. He made his debut for the club on 4 March 2017 in a 2–0 home win against Tianjin Quanjian, coming on for Chen Zhizhao in the 86th minute. After six seasons with the team he left the club on 29 March 2023 after they were dissolved due to financial difficulties.

On 12 April 2023 he joined fellow top tier club Chengdu Rongcheng for the start of the 2023 Chinese Super League season.

== Career statistics ==
As of 31 December 2022.

Appearances and goals by club, season and competition
Club	Season	League			National Cup		Continental		Other		Total	
Club	Season	Division	Apps	Goals	Apps	Goals	Apps	Goals	Apps	Goals	Apps	Goals
Shenyang Zhongze	2011	China League One	19	0	2	0	-		-		21	0
Shenyang Zhongze	2012	China League One	5	0	3	0	-		-		8	0
Shenyang Zhongze	2013	China League One	5	0	1	0	-		-		6	0
Shenyang Zhongze	2014	China League One	18	4	1	0	-		-		19	4
Shenyang Zhongze	Total		47	4	7	0	0	0	0	0	54	4
Dalian Transcendence	2016	China League One	25	1	1	0	-		-		26	1
Guangzhou R&F/ Guangzhou City	2017	Chinese Super League	13	0	0	0	-		-		13	0
Guangzhou R&F/ Guangzhou City	2018	Chinese Super League	11	0	4	0	-		-		15	0
Guangzhou R&F/ Guangzhou City	2019	Chinese Super League	13	0	1	0	-		-		14	0
Guangzhou R&F/ Guangzhou City	2020	Chinese Super League	13	0	1	1	-		-		14	1
Guangzhou R&F/ Guangzhou City	2021	Chinese Super League	13	1	1	0	-		-		14	1
Guangzhou R&F/ Guangzhou City	2022	Chinese Super League	30	1	0	0	-		-		30	1
Guangzhou R&F/ Guangzhou City	Total		93	2	7	1	0	0	0	0	100	3
Chengdu Rongcheng	2023	Chinese Super League	0	0	0	0	-		-		0	0
Career total			165	7	15	1	0	0	0	0	180	8
