= Fan Yunlong =

Chinese footballer (born 1989)

Fan Yunlong 范云龙
Personal information
- Full name: Fan Yunlong
- Date of birth: 15 March 1989 (age 37)
- Place of birth: Guiyang, Guizhou, China
- Height: 1.81 m (5 ft 11 1/2 in)
- Position: Left midfielder

Senior career*
Years	Team	Apps	(Gls)
2008–2010	Guizhou Zhicheng	29	(11)
2011	Shanghai East Asia	0	(0)
2011–2012	Guizhou Zhicheng	53	(19)
2013–2016	Guizhou Renhe	26	(1)
2016	→ Guizhou Zhicheng (loan)	22	(3)
2017–2018	Guizhou Hengfeng	48	(3)
2019–2022	Guangzhou City	39	(0)
2020	→ Guizhou Hengfeng (loan)	5	(1)
- * Club domestic league appearances and goals as of 31 December 2022

Fan Yunlong (Chinese: 范云龙; pinyin: Fàn Yúnlóng; born 15 March 1989) is a Chinese former footballer who played as a left midfielder for Guizhou Zhicheng, Shanghai East Asia, Guizhou Renhe and Guangzhou City.

In his playing career, he had a long association with Guizhou Zhicheng who he represented on four separate occasions. He helped them earn two promotions and played in three divisions for them. He also played for neighboring club Guizhou Renhe where he won the Chinese FA Cup and Chinese FA Super Cup as well as Shanghai East Asia and Guangzhou City before retiring.

== Club career ==
Fan Yunlong started his football career with hometown club Guizhou Zhicheng in 2008 and played in the China League Two with the club for three seasons. He then transferred to China League One side Shanghai East Asia after Guizhou Zhicheng failed to be promoted in the 2010 season. However, Guizhou Zhicheng bought Shanghai Pudong Zobon F.C.'s League One license on 28 January 2011, Shanghai East Asia agreed to let Fan return to Guizhou Zhicheng after nearly one month's negotiation. Fan scored four goals in 24 appearances in the 2011 season, however, Guizhou finished last place in the league and was relegated back to the third tier after they were beaten by Fujian Smart Hero in a penalty shootout in the relegation play-offs. Fan chose to stay in the club for the 2012 season and scored 15 goals in 29 appearances as Guizhou finished first place in the third tier and won promotion back to the second flight.

On 16 January 2013, Fan transferred to Chinese Super League side Guizhou Renhe. In December 2015, Fan returned to Guizhou Zhicheng on a one-year loan deal. He made a permanent transfer to Guizhou Zhicheng on 24 December 2016 after the club won promotion to the Chinese Super League. Fan transferred to fellow Super League side Guangzhou R&F (now known as Guangzhou City) on 22 January 2019 after Guizhou were relegated to the second tier. While he went on to establish himself as a regular with the Guangzhou team, Fan would be allowed to return to Guizhou on loan for the fourth time in his career on 20 May 2020. On 11 April 2023 he announced his retirement from professional football.

== Career statistics ==
Statistics accurate as of match played 31 December 2022.

Appearances and goals by club, season and competition
Club	Season	League			National Cup		Continental		Other		Total	
Club	Season	Division	Apps	Goals	Apps	Goals	Apps	Goals	Apps	Goals	Apps	Goals
Guizhou Zhicheng	2008	China League Two		7	-		-		-			7
Guizhou Zhicheng	2009	China League Two		2	-		-		-			2
Guizhou Zhicheng	2010	China League Two		2	-		-		-			2
Guizhou Zhicheng	Total		29	11	0	0	0	0	0	0	29	11
Shanghai East Asia	2011	China League One	0	0	0	0	-		-		0	0
Guizhou Zhicheng	2011	China League One	24	4	1	0	-		1 (Note: Appearance(s) Promotion/Relegation Play-offs)	0	26	4
Guizhou Zhicheng	2012	China League Two	29	15	3	0	-		-		32	15
Guizhou Zhicheng	Total		53	19	4	0	0	0	1	0	58	19
Guizhou Renhe	2013	Chinese Super League	10	1	1	0	0	0	-		11	1
Guizhou Renhe	2014	Chinese Super League	7	0	1	0	4	0	1 (Note: Appearance(s) in Chinese FA Super Cup)	0	13	0
Guizhou Renhe	2015	Chinese Super League	9	0	2	0	-		-		11	0
Guizhou Renhe	Total		26	1	4	0	4	0	1	0	35	1
Guizhou Hengfeng (loan)	2016	China League One	22	3	0	0	-		-		22	3
Guizhou Hengfeng	2017	Chinese Super League	23	1	0	0	-		-		23	1
Guizhou Hengfeng	2018	Chinese Super League	25	2	2	0	-		-		27	2
Guizhou Hengfeng	Total		48	3	2	0	0	0	0	0	50	3
Guangzhou R&F/ Guangzhou City	2019	Chinese Super League	18	0	0	0	-		-		18	0
Guangzhou R&F/ Guangzhou City	2021	Chinese Super League	6	0	1	0	-		-		7	0
Guangzhou R&F/ Guangzhou City	2022	Chinese Super League	15	0	2	0	-		-		17	0
Guangzhou R&F/ Guangzhou City	Total		39	0	3	0	0	0	0	0	42	0
Guizhou Hengfeng (loan)	2020	China League One	5	1	0	0	-		-		5	1
Career total			222	38	10	0	4	0	2	0	238	38

== Honours ==
=== Club ===
Guizhou Zhicheng

- China League Two: 2012

Guizhou Renhe

- Chinese FA Cup: 2013
- Chinese FA Super Cup: 2014
