= Sun Jun (footballer) =

Chinese footballer

Sun Jun 손군 孙君
Personal information
- Date of birth: 29 April 1993 (age 33)
- Place of birth: Wangqing, Jilin, China
- Height: 1.70 m (5 ft 7 in)
- Position: Attacking midfielder

Team information
- Current team: Yanbian Longding
- Number: 8

Senior career*
Years	Team	Apps	(Gls)
2012–2018	Yanbian FC	80	(4)
2019–2022	Changchun Yatai	14	(0)
2020	→ Xi'an Daxing Chongde (Loan)	4	(0)
2021	→ Hebei Zhuoao (Loan)	9	(0)
2022	Shanghai Jiading Huilong	16	(0)
2023–	Yanbian Longding	0	(0)
- * Club domestic league appearances and goals as of 31 January 2023

Sun Jun
- Simplified Chinese: 孙君
Transcriptions
Standard Mandarin
- Hanyu Pinyin: Sūn Jūn
- IPA: [swə́n.tɕýn]

Chinese Korean name
- Chosŏn'gŭl: 손군
Transcriptions
- Revised Romanization: Son Gun
- McCune–Reischauer: Son Kun

Sun Jun (Chinese: 孙君; Korean: 손군; born 29 April 1993) is a Chinese footballer who currently plays for Yanbian Longding.

== Club career ==
Sun Jun started his professional football career in 2012 when he was promoted to Yanbian FC's first team squad. He would soon go on to establish himself as an integral member within the team and win the 2015 China League One division title as well as promotion to the top tier at the end of the campaign. On 5 March 2016, Sun made his Chinese Super League debut in the first match of 2016 season against Shanghai Shenhua, in a game that ended in a 1-1 draw. He would initially be an integral part of the team that was able to ensure the club remain within the league, but his season was blighted by injuries that saw him miss much of the season. In the following campaign he would finally return to the team, but he was unable to help the club avoid relegation at the end of the 2017 Chinese Super League campaign.

Sun would remain with Yanbian FC throughout the 2018 China League One campaign as the club attempted to push for promotion. After an unsuccessful promotion push at the end of the season on 26 February 2019, Yanbian FC was dissolved due to financial difficulties from owing taxes. On 21 February 2019, Sun transferred to newly-relegated League One side Changchun Yatai. He would make his debut for the club in a league game on 9 March 2019 against Shanghai Shenxin in a 4-1 victory. Often used sparingly he would go on to be loaned out to Xi'an Daxing Chongde and then Hebei Zhuoao before joining second tier club Shanghai Jiading Huilong. On 29 March 2023, Sun joined another second tier club in Yanbian Longding.

== Career statistics ==
Statistics accurate as of match played 31 January 2023.

Appearances and goals by club, season and competition
Club	Season	League			National Cup		Continental		Other		Total	
Club	Season	Division	Apps	Goals	Apps	Goals	Apps	Goals	Apps	Goals	Apps	Goals
Yanbian FC	2012	China League One	5	0	0	0	-		-		5	0
Yanbian FC	2013	China League One	20	1	0	0	-		-		20	1
Yanbian FC	2014	China League One	0	0	0	0	-		-		0	0
Yanbian FC	2015	China League One	22	2	1	0	-		-		23	2
Yanbian FC	2016	Chinese Super League	9	0	1	0	-		-		10	0
Yanbian FC	2017	Chinese Super League	14	1	0	0	-		-		14	1
Yanbian FC	2018	China League One	10	0	0	0	-		-		10	0
Yanbian FC	Total		80	4	2	0	0	0	0	0	82	4
Changchun Yatai	2019	China League One	14	0	0	0	-		-		14	0
Xi'an Daxing Chongde (Loan)	2020	China League Two	4	0	-		-		-		4	0
Hebei Zhuoao (Loan)	2021	China League Two	9	0	0	0	-		-		9	0
Shanghai Jiading Huilong	2022	China League One	16	0	0	0	-		-		16	0
Yanbian Longding	2023	China League One	0	0	0	0	-		-		0	0
Career total			123	4	2	0	0	0	0	0	125	4

== Honours ==
=== Club ===
Yanbian FC

- China League One: 2015.
