= China national football team results (1990–2009) =

This article lists the results for the China national football team between 1990 and 2009.

Key
Win
Draw
Defeat

== 1990 ==
Date	Venue	Opponents	Score	Competition	Scorers
14 July	Baghdad, Iraq	Iraq	1–4^{1}	Friendly	Ma Lin
16 July	Baghdad, Iraq	Iraq	0–0^{1}	Friendly	
27 July	Beijing, China	North Korea	2–0	Dynasty Cup 1990	Gao Sheng, Ma Lin
29 July	Beijing, China	Japan	1–0	Dynasty Cup 1990	Wu Qunli
31 July	Beijing, China	South Korea	0–1	Dynasty Cup 1990	
3 August	Beijing, China	South Korea	1–1AET; 4–5PSO	Dynasty Cup 1990	
16 August	Wellington, New Zealand	New Zealand	1–2	Friendly	Liu Haiguang
24 August	Auckland, New Zealand	New Zealand	0–1	Friendly	
23 September	Beijing, China	Pakistan	3–0	1990 Asian Games	Xie Yuxin(2), Mai Chao
25 September	Beijing, China	Singapore	5–1	1990 Asian Games	Liu Haiguang(2), Xie Yuxin, Mai Chao, Wu Qunli
27 September	Beijing, China	South Korea	0–2	1990 Asian Games	
1 October	Beijing, China	Thailand	0–1	1990 Asian Games	
1: Non FIFA 'A' international match

== 1992 ==
Date	Venue	Opponents	Score	Competition	Scorers
22 January	Bangkok, Thailand	Indonesia	2–0^{1}	Friendly	Xu Hui, Li Xiao
24 January	Bangkok, Thailand	Thailand	1–1^{1}	Friendly	Gao Hongbo
2 April	Victoria, Canada	Canada	2–5	Friendly	Xie Yuxin(2)
4 April	Palo Alto, United States	United States	0–5	Friendly	
20 April	Singapore	Indonesia	2–0	1992 AFC Asian Cup qualification	Wu Qunli, Mai Chao
23 April	Singapore	Malaysia	4–0	1992 AFC Asian Cup qualification	Wu Qunli, Guo Yijun, Mai Chao, Gao Hongbo
26 April	Singapore	Singapore	1–0	1992 AFC Asian Cup qualification	Xie Yuxin
28 June	Shanghai, China	Slovakia	2–3^{1}	Friendly	Cai Sheng, Gao Feng
22 August	Beijing, China	North Korea	2–2	Dynasty Cup 1992	Xu Hong, Gao Hongbo
24 August	Beijing, China	Japan	0–2	Dynasty Cup 1992	
26 August	Beijing, China	South Korea	0–2	Dynasty Cup 1992	
31 August	Xiaogan, China	North Korea	0–0AET; 4–5PSO	Friendly	
29 October	Hiroshima, Japan	Saudi Arabia	1–1	1992 AFC Asian Cup	Li Bing
31 October	Hiroshima, Japan	Thailand	0–0	1992 AFC Asian Cup	
2 November	Hiroshima, Japan	Qatar	2–1	1992 AFC Asian Cup	Peng Weiguo(2)
5 November	Hiroshima, Japan	Japan	2–3	1992 AFC Asian Cup	Xie Yuxin, Li Xiao
8 November	Hiroshima, Japan	United Arab Emirates	1–1AET; 4–3PSO	1992 AFC Asian Cup	Hao Haidong
2 December	Guangzhou, China	Norway	2–1	Friendly	Zhu Bo, Peng Weiguo
1: Non FIFA 'A' international match

== 1993 ==
Date	Venue	Opponents	Score	Competition	Scorers
10 February	Bangkok, Thailand	Thailand	0–1^{1}	Friendly	
16 February	Bangkok, Thailand	Thailand	4–0	Friendly	Wu Qunli, Xie Yuxin, Peng Weiguo
24 February	Kuwait City, Kuwait	Kuwait	0–1	Friendly	
28 March	Kuala Lumpur, Malaysia	United Arab Emirates	0–0	Friendly	
30 March	Kuala Lumpur, Malaysia	United Arab Emirates	1–2	Friendly	Wu Qunli
22 May	Irbid, Jordan	Pakistan	5–0	1994 FIFA World Cup qualification	Cai Sheng(2), Gao Hongbo, Hao Haidong, Wu Qunli
25 May	Irbid, Jordan	Jordan	3–0	1994 FIFA World Cup qualification	Gao Hongbo, Wu Qunli, Cai Sheng
28 May	Irbid, Jordan	Yemen	0–1	1994 FIFA World Cup qualification	
31 May	Irbid, Jordan	Iraq	0–1	1994 FIFA World Cup qualification	
12 June	Chengdu, China	Pakistan	3–0	1994 FIFA World Cup qualification	Gao Hongbo(2), Hao Haidong
16 June	Chengdu, China	Jordan	4–1	1994 FIFA World Cup qualification	Gao Hongbo(2), Li Bing
18 June	Chengdu, China	Yemen	1–0	1994 FIFA World Cup qualification	Xu Hong
20 June	Chengdu, China	Iraq	2–1	1994 FIFA World Cup qualification	Xu Hong, Zhao Faqing
4 November	San Diego, Mexico	Mexico	0–3	Friendly	
1: Non FIFA 'A' international match

== 1994 ==
Date	Venue	Opponents	Score	Competition	Scorers
23 January	Riyadh, Saudi Arabia	Saudi Arabia	0–1	Friendly	
26 January	Riyadh, Saudi Arabia	Saudi Arabia	1–1	Friendly	
1 October	Hiroshima, Japan	Turkmenistan	2–2	1994 Asian Games	Gao Feng, Gao Zhongxun
3 October	Hiroshima, Japan	Yemen	4–0	1994 Asian Games	Gao Feng, Li Bing, Peng Weiguo, Cao Xiandong
5 October	Hiroshima, Japan	Bahrain	3–2	1994 Asian Games	Li Xiao(2), Peng Weiguo
7 October	Hiroshima, Japan	Iran	1–0	1994 Asian Games	Gao Zhongxun
11 October	Hiroshima, Japan	Saudi Arabia	2–0	1994 Asian Games	Cao Xiandong, Li Xiao
14 October	Hiroshima, Japan	Kuwait	2–0	1994 Asian Games	Li Bing, Peng Weiguo
16 October	Hiroshima, Japan	Uzbekistan	2–4	1994 Asian Games	Li Bing, Hu Zhijun

== 1995 ==
Date	Venue	Opponents	Score	Competition	Scorers
19 February	Hong Kong	South Korea	0–0	Dynasty Cup 1995	
21 February	Hong Kong	Hong Kong	0–0	Dynasty Cup 1995	
23 February	Hong Kong	Japan	1–2	Dynasty Cup 1995	Gao Feng
26 February	Hong Kong	Hong Kong	1–1AET; 1–3PSO	Dynasty Cup 1995	Li Bing
26 October	Beijing, China	Colombia	2–1	Friendly	Hao Haidong, Li Bing

== 1996 ==
Date	Venue	Opponents	Score	Competition	Scorers
30 January	Hong Kong	Macau	7–1	1996 AFC Asian Cup qualification	Li Bing(3), Peng Weiguo(2), Su Maozhen, Hao Haidong
1 February	Hong Kong	Philippines	7–0	1996 AFC Asian Cup qualification	Hao Haidong(3), Su Maozhen(2), Ma Mingyu, Gao Feng
4 February	Hong Kong	Hong Kong	2–0	1996 AFC Asian Cup qualification	Fan Zhiyi, Wei Qun
23 May	Beijing, China	England	0–3	Friendly	
29 May	Tilburg, Netherlands	Netherlands	0–2	Friendly	
28 June	Beijing, China	New Zealand	2–0	Friendly	Hao Haidong, Gao Feng
17 July	Beijing, China	Uruguay	1–1	Friendly	Ma Mingyu
8 August	Beijing, China	Paraguay	0–2	Friendly	
25 September	Seoul, Korea Republic	South Korea	1–3	Friendly	Hao Haidong
26 November	Guangzhou, China	South Korea	2–3	Friendly	Hao Haidong, Li Bing
6 December	Al Ain, United Arab Emirates	Uzbekistan	0–2	1996 AFC Asian Cup	
9 December	Al Ain, United Arab Emirates	Syria	3–0	1996 AFC Asian Cup	Ma Mingyu, Gao Feng, Li Bing
12 December	Al Ain, United Arab Emirates	Japan	0–1	1996 AFC Asian Cup	
16 December	Abu Dhabi, United Arab Emirates	Saudi Arabia	3–4	1996 AFC Asian Cup	Zhang Enhua(2), Peng Weiguo

== 1997 ==
Date	Venue	Opponents	Score	Competition	Scorers
29 January	Kunming, China	United States	2–1	Friendly	Hao Haidong, Li Tie
1 February	Guangzhou, China	United States	1–1	Friendly	Su Maozhen
21 February	Kuala Lumpur, Malaysia	Singapore	3–1	1997 Dunhill Cup Malaysia	Fan Zhiyi, Li Jinyu, Su Maozhen
23 February	Kuala Lumpur, Malaysia	Finland	2–1	1997 Dunhill Cup Malaysia	Li Ming, Hao Haidong
25 February	Kuala Lumpur, Malaysia	Malaysia	2–0	1997 Dunhill Cup Malaysia	Su Maozhen, Sui Dongliang
28 February	Kuala Lumpur, Malaysia	Zimbabwe	3–1	1997 Dunhill Cup Malaysia	Fan Zhiyi(2), Li Ming
2 March	Kuala Lumpur, Malaysia	Bosnia and Herzegovina	3–0	1997 Dunhill Cup Malaysia	Li Jinyu(2), Hao Haidong
30 March	Kochi, India	Iraq	0–2^{1}	Nehru Cup 1997	
1 April	Kochi, India	India	0–0^{1}	Nehru Cup 1997	
3 April	Kochi, India	Ghana	0–0^{1}	Nehru Cup 1997	
6 April	Kochi, India	Uzbekistan	1–1^{1}	Nehru Cup 1997	Sun Zhi
9 April	Kochi, India	Uzbekistan	1–2AET^{1}	Nehru Cup 1997	Qiu Zhonghui
11 April	Kochi, India	India	2–1^{1}	Nehru Cup 1997	Bao Wenjie, Huang Yong
20 April	Beijing, China	Myanmar	5–0	Friendly	Fan Zhiyi, Hao Haidong, Li Jinyu, Zhang Enhua, Li Tie
23 April	Beijing, China	South Korea	0–2	Friendly	
27 April	Beijing, China	Iran	0–0	Friendly	
4 May	Ashgabat, Turkmenistan	Turkmenistan	4–1	1998 FIFA World Cup qualification	Peng Weiguo(2), Gao Feng, Li Bing
11 May	Dushanbe, Tajikistan	Tajikistan	1–0	1998 FIFA World Cup qualification	Hao Haidong
25 May	Ho Chi Minh City, Vietnam	Vietnam	3–1	1998 FIFA World Cup qualification	Li Bing, Fan Zhiyi, Hao Haidong
1 June	Beijing, China	Turkmenistan	1–0	1998 FIFA World Cup qualification	Li Jinyu
8 June	Beijing, China	Tajikistan	0–0	1998 FIFA World Cup qualification	
22 June	Beijing, China	Vietnam	4–0	1998 FIFA World Cup qualification	Fan Zhiyi, Hao Haidong, Ma Mingyu, Su Maozhen
30 August	Seoul, Korea Republic	South Korea	0–0	Friendly	
2 September	Dalian, China	Kazakhstan	3–0	Friendly	Fan Zhiyi, Li Jinyu, Li Bing
13 September	Dalian, China	Iran	2–4	1998 FIFA World Cup qualification	Fan Zhiyi, Li Ming
26 September	Doha, Qatar	Qatar	1–1	1998 FIFA World Cup qualification	Hao Haidong
3 October	Dalian, China	Saudi Arabia	1–0	1998 FIFA World Cup qualification	Zhang Enhua
10 October	Kuwait City, Kuwait	Kuwait	2–1	1998 FIFA World Cup qualification	Hao Haidong, Gao Feng
17 October	Tehran, Iran	Iran	1–4	1998 FIFA World Cup qualification	Mao Yijun
31 October	Dalian, China	Qatar	2–3	1998 FIFA World Cup qualification	Gao Feng, Fan Zhiyi
6 November	Riyadh, Saudi Arabia	Saudi Arabia	1–1	1998 FIFA World Cup qualification	Hao Haidong
12 November	Dalian, China	Kuwait	1–0	1998 FIFA World Cup qualification	Ma Mingyu
1: Non FIFA 'A' international match

== 1998 ==
Date	Venue	Opponents	Score	Competition	Scorers
1 March	Tokyo, Japan	Hong Kong	1–0^{1}	Dynasty Cup 1998	Zhang Enhua
4 March	Yokohama, Japan	South Korea	1–2	Dynasty Cup 1998	Li Bing
7 March	Tokyo, Japan	Japan	2–0	Dynasty Cup 1998	Li Bing(2)
4 June	Seoul, Korea Republic	South Korea	1–1	Friendly	Ma Mingyu
27 June	Bangkok, Thailand	Thailand	3–0	Friendly	Zhu Qi, Li Bing, Hao Haidong
30 June	Kuala Lumpur, Malaysia	Malaysia	1–1^{1}	Friendly	Zhu Qi
8 July	Shanghai, China	Uzbekistan	3–1^{1}	Friendly	Hao Haidong, Li Bing, Ma Mingyu
22 November	Shanghai, China	South Korea	0–0	Friendly	
30 November	Surat Thani, Thailand	Lebanon	4–1	1998 Asian Games	Fan Zhiyi, Ma Mingyu, Li Jinyu, Wang Peng
2 December	Surat Thani, Thailand	Cambodia	4–1	1998 Asian Games	Yang Chen(3), Wang Peng
8 December	Bangkok, Thailand	Tajikistan	3–1	1998 Asian Games	Zhao Junzhe, Li Jinyu, Own Goal
10 December	Bangkok, Thailand	Oman	6–1	1998 Asian Games	Li Jinyu(2), Hao Haidong, Yao Xia, Li Weifeng, Yang Chen
12 December	Bangkok, Thailand	Iran	1–2	1998 Asian Games	Li Jinyu
14 December	Bangkok, Thailand	Turkmenistan	3–0	1998 Asian Games	Li Jinyu(2), Hao Haidong
16 December	Bangkok, Thailand	Iran	0–1	1998 Asian Games	
19 December	Bangkok, Thailand	Thailand	3–0	1998 Asian Games	Fan Zhiyi, Wang Peng, Ma Mingyu
1: Non FIFA 'A' international match

== 2000 ==
Date	Venue	Opponents	Score	Competition	Scorers
14 January	Guangzhou China	New Zealand	1–0	2000 Four Nations Tournament	Li Tie
16 January	Guangzhou China	Uruguay	1–0	2000 Four Nations Tournament	Hao Haidong
23 January	Ho Chi Minh City, Vietnam	Philippines	8–0	2000 AFC Asian Cup qualification	Su Maozhen(5), Hao Haidong, Yao Xia, Ma Mingyu
26 January	Ho Chi Minh City, Vietnam	Guam	19–0	2000 AFC Asian Cup qualification	Qu Shengqing(5), Hao Haidong(4), Su Maozhen(3), Yao Xia(2), Ma Mingyu, Li Weifeng, Li Tie, Shen Si, Qi Hong
29 January	Ho Chi Minh City, Vietnam	Vietnam	2–0	2000 AFC Asian Cup qualification	Su Maozhen, Zhang Enhua
15 March	Kobe, Japan	Japan	0–0	Friendly	
28 March	Belgrade, FR Yugoslavia	FR Yugoslavia	0–1	Friendly	
25 April	Hong Kong, China	Hong Kong	1–0	Friendly	Qi Hong
25 May	Beijing, China	FR Yugoslavia	0–2	Friendly	
28 July	Beijing, China	South Korea	0–1	Friendly	
1 September	Shanghai, China	Thailand	3–1	2000 Four Nations Tournament	Su Maozhen, Qi Hong, Song Lihui
3 September	Shanghai, China	Iraq	4–1	2000 Four Nations Tournament	Li Weifeng(2), Su Maozhen(2)
5 October	Zarqa, Jordan	Saudi Arabia	0–2	Friendly	
7 October	Amman, Jordan	Jordan	1–1	Friendly	Yang Chen
13 October	Tripoli, Lebanon	South Korea	2–2	2000 AFC Asian Cup	Su Maozhen, Fan Zhiyi
16 October	Tripoli, Lebanon	Indonesia	4–0	2000 AFC Asian Cup	Li Ming, Shen Si, Yang Chen, Qi Hong
19 October	Tripoli, Lebanon	Kuwait	0–0	2000 AFC Asian Cup	
24 October	Sidon, Lebanon	Qatar	3–1	2000 AFC Asian Cup	Li Ming, Yang Chen, Qi Hong
27 October	Beirut, Lebanon	Japan	2–3	2000 AFC Asian Cup	Qi Hong, Yang Chen
29 October	Beirut, Lebanon	South Korea	0–1	2000 AFC Asian Cup	

== 2001 ==
Date	Venue	Opponents	Score	Competition	Scorers
17 January	Tehran, Iran	Egypt	0–0AET; 2–3PSO	Friendly	
19 January	Tehran, Iran	Iran	0–4	Friendly	
27 January	Oakland, United States	United States	1–2	Friendly	Qu Bo
10 February	Bangkok, Thailand	Qatar	1–1	2001 King's Cup	Su Maozhen
12 February	Bangkok, Thailand	Sweden	2–2	2001 King's Cup	Zhang Yuning(2)
14 February	Bangkok, Thailand	Thailand	5–1	2001 King's Cup	Zhang Yuning(3), Su Maozhen, Li Tie
17 February	Bangkok, Thailand	Sweden	0–3	2001 King's Cup	
22 April	Xi'an, China	Maldives	10–1	2002 FIFA World Cup qualification	Xie Hui(3), Xu Yunlong(2), Fan Zhiyi(2), Wu Chengying, Yang Chen, Li Weifeng
28 April	Malé, Maldives	Maldives	1–0	2002 FIFA World Cup qualification	Xie Hui
6 May	Phnom Penh, Cambodia	Cambodia	4–0	2002 FIFA World Cup qualification	Li Jinyu(2), Qu Bo, Ma Mingyu
13 May	Kunming, China	Indonesia	5–1	2002 FIFA World Cup qualification	Xie Hui(2), Li Weifeng, Yang Chen, Qi Hong
20 May	Guangzhou China	Cambodia	3–1	2002 FIFA World Cup qualification	Ma Mingyu, Xu Yunlong, Li Bing
27 May	Jakarta, Indonesia	Indonesia	2–0	2002 FIFA World Cup qualification	Xie Hui, Wu Chengying
3 August	Shanghai, China	North Korea	2–2AET; 2–4PSO	2001 Four Nations Tournament	Shen Si, Zhang Enhua
5 August	Shanghai, China	Trinidad and Tobago	3–0	2001 Four Nations Tournament	Hao Haidong, Su Maozhen, Zhang Yuning
25 August	Shenyang, China	United Arab Emirates	3–0	2002 FIFA World Cup qualification	Li Xiaopeng, Qi Hong, Hao Haidong
31 August	Muscat, Oman	Oman	2–0	2002 FIFA World Cup qualification	Qi Hong, Fan Zhiyi
7 September	Doha, Qatar	Qatar	1–1	2002 FIFA World Cup qualification	Li Weifeng
15 September	Shenyang, China	Uzbekistan	2–0	2002 FIFA World Cup qualification	Li Weifeng, Fan Zhiyi
27 September	Abu Dhabi, United Arab Emirates	United Arab Emirates	1–0	2002 FIFA World Cup qualification	Qi Hong
7 October	Shenyang, China	Oman	1–0	2002 FIFA World Cup qualification	Yu Genwei
13 October	Shenyang, China	Qatar	3–0	2002 FIFA World Cup qualification	Su Maozhen, Qu Bo, Hao Haidong
19 October	Tashkent, Uzbekistan	Uzbekistan	0–1	2002 FIFA World Cup qualification	

== 2002 ==
Date	Venue	Opponents	Score	Competition	Scorers
15 February	Hong Kong, China	Slovenia	0–0AET; 3–4PSO	2002 Lunar New Year Cup	
27 April	Incheon, Korea Republic	South Korea	0–0	Friendly	
11 May	Kunming, China	Thailand	3–1	Friendly	Su Maozhen(3)
16 May	Shenyang, China	Uruguay	0–2	Friendly	
25 May	Macau, China	Portugal	0–2	Friendly	
4 June	Gwangju, Korea Republic	Costa Rica	0–2	2002 FIFA World Cup	
8 June	Jeju, Korea Republic	Brazil	0–4	2002 FIFA World Cup	
13 June	Seoul, Korea Republic	Turkey	0–3	2002 FIFA World Cup	
7 December	Manama, Bahrain	Syria	3–1	Friendly	Zhao Junzhe, Wang Xinxin, Xu Yunlong
9 December	Manama, Bahrain	Jordan	0–0	Friendly	
12 December	Manama, Bahrain	Bahrain	2–2	Friendly	Cao Yang, Qu Bo

- China played the non-FIFA Catalonia team on 28 December 2002; this did not contribute to ranking points or individual cap totals.

== 2003 ==
Date	Venue	Opponents	Score	Competition	Scorers
12 February	Guangzhou, China	Brazil	0–0	Friendly	
16 February	Wuhan, China	Estonia	1–0	Friendly	Li Weifeng
20 August	Tianjin, China	Chile	0–0	Friendly	
31 August	Fort Lauderdale, United States	Haiti	3–4	Friendly	Qi Hong, Xiao Zhanbo, Li Jinyu
7 September	Fort Lauderdale, United States	Costa Rica	0–2	Friendly	
4 December	Tokyo, Japan	Japan	0–2	2003 East Asian Football Championship	
7 December	Saitama, Japan	South Korea	0–1	2003 East Asian Football Championship	
10 December	Yokohama, Japan	Hong Kong	3–1	2003 East Asian Football Championship	Zhao Xuri, Liu Jindong, Yang Chen

== 2004 ==
Date	Venue	Opponents	Score	Competition	Scorers
27 January	Yiwu, China	Macedonia	0–0	Friendly	
29 January	Suzhou, China	Macedonia	1–0	Friendly	Zheng Zhi
3 February	Guangzhou, China	Finland	2–1	Friendly	Zhang Yuning, Hao Haidong
7 February	Shenzhen, China	Finland	2–1	Friendly	Zhang Yuning, Zheng Zhi
18 February	Guangzhou, China	Kuwait	1–0	2006 FIFA World Cup qualification	Hao Haidong
17 March	Guangzhou, China	Myanmar	2–0	Friendly	Zheng Zhi, Xu Yunlong
31 March	Hong Kong, China	Hong Kong	1–0	2006 FIFA World Cup qualification	Hao Haidong
14 April	Peralada, Spain	Andorra	0–0	Friendly	
28 April	Clermont-Ferrand, France	Algeria	1–0	Friendly	Xiao Zhanbo
1 June	Tianjin, China	Hungary	2–1	Friendly	Zhou Haibin, Zheng Zhi
9 June	Tianjin, China	Malaysia	4–0	2006 FIFA World Cup qualification	Li Xiaopeng(2), Hao Haidong, Sun Jihai
3 July	Chongqing, China	Lebanon	6–0	Friendly	Li Jinyu(2), Yan Song, Li Ming, Zhang Shuo, Li Yi
10 July	Hohhot, China	United Arab Emirates	2–2	Friendly	Zheng Zhi(2)
17 July	Beijing, China	Bahrain	2–2	2004 AFC Asian Cup	Zheng Zhi, Li Jinyu
21 July	Beijing, China	Indonesia	5–0	2004 AFC Asian Cup	Shao Jiayi(2), Hao Haidong, Li Ming, Li Yi
25 July	Beijing, China	Qatar	1–0	2004 AFC Asian Cup	Xu Yunlong
30 July	Beijing, China	Iraq	3–0	2004 AFC Asian Cup	Hao Haidong, Zheng Zhi(2)
3 August	Beijing, China	Iran	1–1AET; 4–3PSO	2004 AFC Asian Cup	Shao Jiayi
7 August	Beijing, China	Japan	1–3	2004 AFC Asian Cup	Li Ming
8 September	Penang, Malaysia	Malaysia	1–0	2006 FIFA World Cup qualification	Li Jinyu
13 October	Kuwait City, Kuwait	Kuwait	0–1	2006 FIFA World Cup qualification	
17 November	Guangzhou, China	Hong Kong	7–0	2006 FIFA World Cup qualification	Li Jinyu(2), Shao Jiayi(2), Xu Yunlong, Yu Genwei, Li Weifeng

== 2005 ==
Date	Venue	Opponents	Score	Competition	Scorers
26 March	Salamanca, Spain	Spain	0–3	Friendly	
29 March	Dublin, Ireland	Republic of Ireland	0–1	Friendly	
19 June	Changsha, China	Costa Rica	2–2	Friendly	Zhang Yaokun, Sun Xiang
22 June	Guangzhou, China	Costa Rica	2–0	Friendly	Zheng Zhi, Xie Hui
31 July	Daejeon, Korea Republic	South Korea	1–1	2005 East Asian Football Championship	Sun Xiang
3 August	Daejeon, Korea Republic	Japan	2–2	2005 East Asian Football Championship	Li Jinyu, Zhang Yonghai
7 August	Daejeon, Korea Republic	North Korea	2–0	2005 East Asian Football Championship	Li Yan, Xie Hui
12 October	Hamburg, Germany	Germany	0–1	Friendly	
13 November	Nanjing, China	Serbia and Montenegro	0–2	Friendly	
16 November	Nanjing, China	Bulgaria	0–0^{1}	Friendly	
1:Non FIFA 'A' international match

== 2006 ==
Date	Venue	Opponents	Score	Competition	Scorers
12 February	Guangzhou, China	Honduras	0–1	Friendly	
22 February	Guangzhou, China	Palestine	2–0	2007 AFC Asian Cup qualification	Du Wei, Li Weifeng
1 March	Al Ain, United Arab Emirates	Iraq	1–2	2007 AFC Asian Cup qualification	Tao Wei
3 June	Zürich, Switzerland	Switzerland	1–4	Friendly	Dong Fangzhuo
7 June	Saint-Étienne, France	France	1–3	Friendly	Zheng Zhi
10 August	Qinhuangdao, China	Thailand	4–0	Friendly	Li Jinyu, Wang Dong, Du Zhenyu, Xu Liang
16 August	Tianjin, China	Singapore	1–0	2007 AFC Asian Cup qualification	Shao Jiayi
6 September	Singapore	Singapore	0–0	2007 AFC Asian Cup qualification	
11 October	Amman, Jordan	Palestine	2–0	2007 AFC Asian Cup qualification	Mao Jianqing, Sun Xiang
15 November	Changsha, China	Iraq	1–1	2007 AFC Asian Cup qualification	Han Peng

== 2007 ==
Date	Venue	Opponents	Score	Competition	Scorers
7 February	Suzhou, China	Kazakhstan	2–1	Friendly	Han Peng, Li Jinyu
24 March	Guangzhou, China	Australia	0–2	Friendly	
27 March	Macau, China	Uzbekistan	3–1	Friendly	Han Peng(2), Own goal
16 May	Bangkok, Thailand	Thailand	0–1	Friendly	
2 June	San Jose, United States	United States	1–4	Friendly	Zhang Yaokun
10 July	Kuala Lumpur, Malaysia	Malaysia	5–1	2007 AFC Asian Cup	Han Peng(2), Shao Jiayi, Wang Dong(2)
15 July	Kuala Lumpur, Malaysia	Iran	2–2	2007 AFC Asian Cup	Shao Jiayi, Mao Jianqing
18 July	Kuala Lumpur, Malaysia	Uzbekistan	0–3	2007 AFC Asian Cup	
21 October	Foshan, China	Myanmar	7–0	2010 FIFA World Cup qualification	Qu Bo(2), Du Zhenyu 25', Yang Lin, Liu Jian, Li Jinyu, Li Weifeng
28 October	Kuala Lumpur, Malaysia	Myanmar	4–0	2010 FIFA World Cup qualification	Wu Wei'an, Liu Jian, Zheng Bin, Zhang Yaokun

== 2008 ==
Date	Venue	Opponents	Score	Competition	Scorers
10 January	Dubai, United Arab Emirates	United Arab Emirates	0–0	Friendly	
20 January	Zhongshan, China	Lebanon	0–0	Friendly	
27 January	Zhongshan, China	Syria	2–1	Friendly	Qu Bo, Zhu Ting
6 February	Dubai, United Arab Emirates	Iraq	1–1	2010 FIFA World Cup qualification	Zheng Zhi
17 February	Chongqing, China	South Korea	2–3	2008 East Asian Football Championship	Zhou Haibin, Liu Jian
20 February	Chongqing, China	Japan	0–1	2008 East Asian Football Championship	
23 February	Chongqing, China	North Korea	3–1	2008 East Asian Football Championship	Zhu Ting, Wang Dong, Hao Junmin
15 March	Kunming, China	Thailand	3–3	Friendly	Qu Bo, Han Peng, Zhu Ting
26 March	Kunming, China	Australia	0–0	2010 FIFA World Cup qualification	
16 April	Seattle, United States	Mexico	0–1	Friendly	
23 April	Los Angeles, United States	El Salvador	2–2	Friendly	Xiao Zhanbo, Qu Bo
25 May	Kunshan, China	Jordan	2–0	Friendly	Hao Junmin, Li Weifeng
2 June	Doha, Qatar	Qatar	0–0	2010 FIFA World Cup qualification	
7 June	Tianjin, China	Qatar	0–1	2010 FIFA World Cup qualification	
14 June	Tianjin, China	Iraq	1–2	2010 FIFA World Cup qualification	Zhou Haibin
22 June	Sydney, Australia	Australia	1–0	2010 FIFA World Cup qualification	Sun Xiang
17 December	Muscat, Oman	Oman	1–3	Friendly	Qu Bo
19 December	Muscat, Oman	Iran	0–2	Friendly	
21 December	Amman, Jordan	Jordan	1–0	Friendly	Cao Yang

== 2009 ==
Date	Venue	Opponents	Score	Competition	Scorers
9 January	Tehran, Iran	Iran	1–3	Friendly	Huang Bowen
14 January	Aleppo, Syria	Syria	2–3	2011 AFC Asian Cup qualification	Qu Bo, Jiang Ning
21 January	Hangzhou, China	Vietnam	6–1	2011 AFC Asian Cup qualification	Gao Lin(3), Du Wei, Jiang Ning, Hao Junmin
29 May	Shanghai, China	Germany	1–1	Friendly	Hao Junmin
1 June	Qinhuangdao, China	Iran	1–0	Friendly	Gao Lin
4 June	Tianjin, China	Saudi Arabia	1–4	Friendly	Jiang Ning
18 July	Tianjin, China	Palestine	3–1	Friendly	Qu Bo, Gao Lin, Yang Hao
25 July	Tianjin, China	Kyrgyzstan	3–0	Friendly	Han Peng, Hao Junmin, Yu Hai
12 August	Singapore	Singapore	1–1AET; 4–3PSO	Friendly	Yang Hao
15 August	Kuala Lumpur, Malaysia	Malaysia	0–0	Friendly	
9 September	Harbin, China	Senegal	0–0^{1}	Friendly	
30 September	Hohhot, China	Botswana	4–1	Friendly	Gao Lin, Qu Bo, Zhao Peng, Yu Hai
8 October	Kuwait City, Kuwait	Kuwait	2–2	Friendly	Zheng Long, Han Peng
14 November	Beirut, Lebanon	Lebanon	2–0	2011 AFC Asian Cup qualification	Yu Hai, Qu Bo
22 November	Hangzhou, China	Lebanon	1–0	2011 AFC Asian Cup qualification	Du Wei
30 December	Yiwu, China	Jordan	2–2	Friendly	Zhang Linpeng, Han Peng
1:Non FIFA 'A' international match
