= 2001 Chinese Football Super Cup =

Shanghai Shenhua	Dalian Shide
3	1

First leg
Shanghai Shenhua	Dalian Shide
1	1
- Date: 26 February 2002
- Venue: Hongkou Football Stadium, Shanghai
- Referee: Lu Jun

Second leg
Dalian Shide	Shanghai Shenhua
0	2
- Date: 2 March 2002
- Venue: Dalian People's Stadium, Dalian
- Referee: Sun Baojie

The 2001 LG Chinese Football Super Cup (Chinese: LG杯2001年度中国足球超霸杯赛) was the 7th Chinese Football Super Cup, contested by Chinese Jia-A League 2001 and 2001 Chinese FA Cup double winners Dalian Shide and Chinese Jia-A League 2001 runners-up Shanghai Shenhua. Shanghai Shenhua won their 3rd title after winning 3–1 on aggregate.

== Match details ==
=== First leg ===
26 February 2002
19:30 UTC+8

Shanghai Shenhua	1 – 1	Dalian Shide
Wang Ke 74'	Report	Bajčetić 62'

Hongkou Football Stadium, Shanghai
Referee: Lu Jun (Beijing)

GK	1	(China) Yu Weiliang
RB	17	(China) Sun Ji
CB	3	(China) Liu Xiedong
CB	7	(China) Bian Jun
LB	14	(China) Sun Xiang
RM	20	(China) Liu Jun (C)
LM	4	(China) Wu Chengying
DM	32	(China) Liu Hongtao
AM	10	(Uruguay) Rubén Sosa
FW	9	(Brazil) Rodrigues	(yellow card) 37'
FW	11	(Brazil) Orlando		(substituted off) 27'
Substitutes used:
FW	8	(China) Qu Shengqing		(substituted on) 27' (substituted off) 63'
MF	15	(China) Wang Ke		(substituted on) 63'
Manager:
(China) Xu Genbao

GK	23	(China) An Qi
RB	5	(China) Zhang Yaokun
CB	2	(China) Zhang Enhua (C)
CB	16	(China) Ji Mingyi
LB	3	(Brazil) Adilson
DM	12	(China) Wang Sheng
DM	14	(China) Hu Zhaojun
RM	6	(China) Li Ming	(yellow card) 40'	(substituted off) 86'
LM	11	(China) Yan Song		(substituted off) 90+3'
AM	7	(Federal Republic of Yugoslavia) Srđan Bajčetić	(yellow card) 75'
FW	8	(China) Wang Peng		(substituted off) 83'
Substitutes used:
FW	17	(China) Zou Jie		(substituted on) 83'
MF	19	(China) Zou Peng		(substituted on) 86'
DF	20	(China) Guo Liang		(substituted on) 90+3'
Manager:
(Federal Republic of Yugoslavia) Milorad Kosanović

=== Second leg ===
2 March 2002
13:30 UTC+8

Dalian Shide	0 – 2	Shanghai Shenhua
	Report	Orlando 81' (pen.), 90+2'

Dalian People's Stadium, Dalian
Referee: Sun Baojie (Beijing)

GK	23	(China) An Qi
RB	5	(China) Zhang Yaokun
CB	2	(China) Zhang Enhua (C)
CB	16	(China) Ji Mingyi
LB	3	(Brazil) Adilson
DM	12	(China) Wang Sheng
DM	14	(China) Hu Zhaojun	(yellow card) 55'
RM	6	(China) Li Ming
LM	11	(China) Yan Song
AM	7	(Federal Republic of Yugoslavia) Srđan Bajčetić
FW	8	(China) Wang Peng		(substituted off) 79'
Substitutes used:
FW	17	(China) Zou Jie		(substituted on) 79'
Manager:
(Federal Republic of Yugoslavia) Milorad Kosanović

GK	1	(China) Yu Weiliang
RB	29	(China) Yao Lijun	(yellow card) 26'
CB	12	(China) Xin Feng
CB	13	(China) Mao Yijun
LB	14	(China) Sun Xiang
RM	6	(China) Huo Rining		(substituted off) 60'
LM	15	(China) Wang Ke
DM	18	(China) Zheng Kewei
AM	16	(China) Yu Tao
FW	8	(China) Qu Shengqing (C)		(substituted off) 46'
FW	34	(China) Xue Fei		(substituted off) 46'
Substitutes used:
FW	9	(Brazil) Rodrigues		(substituted on) 46'
FW	11	(Brazil) Orlando		(substituted on) 46'
DF	4	(China) Wu Chengying		(substituted on) 60'
Manager:
(China) Xu Genbao

Chinese Football Super Cup
2001 Winners
Shanghai Shenhua
Third title
