= 2002 Chinese Football Super Cup =

Dalian Shide	Qingdao Sbright
1	0
- Date: 6 February 2003
- Venue: Wuhan Sports Center Stadium, Wuhan
- Referee: Lu Jun
- Weather: Cloudy / 4°C

The 2002 LG Chinese Football Super Cup (Chinese: LG杯2002年度中国足球超霸杯赛) was the 8th Chinese Football Super Cup, contested by Chinese Jia-A League 2002 winners Dalian Shide and 2002 Chinese FA Cup winners Qingdao Sbright. The match was played at the Wuhan Sports Center Stadium on 6 February 2003. Dalian Shide beat Qingdao Sbright 1–0, thus winning their third title of Super Cup.

== Match details ==
6 February 2003
19:15 UTC+8

Dalian Shide	1 – 0	Qingdao Sbright
Hao Haidong 11'

Wuhan Sports Center Stadium, Wuhan
Referee: Lu Jun (Beijing)

Dalian Shide:
GK	23	(China) An Qi
DF	3	(Brazil) Adilson
DF	5	(China) Zhang Yaokun
DF	12	(China) Wang Sheng
DF	16	(China) Ji Mingyi
MF	8	(China) Wang Peng (c)
MF	11	(China) Yan Song
MF	14	(China) Hu Zhaojun	(substituted off) 65'
MF	18	(Bulgaria) Zoran Janković	(substituted off) 71'
MF	26	(China) Zhang Yalin
FW	9	(China) Hao Haidong	(substituted off) 52'
Substitutes used:
FW	15	(Bulgaria) Stefan Yurukov	(substituted on) 52'
MF	21	(China) Li Yao	(substituted on) 65'
FW	17	(China) Zou Jie	(substituted on) 71'
Manager:
(Federal Republic of Yugoslavia) Milorad Kosanović

Qingdao Sbright:
GK	22	(China) Yang Jun
DF	2	(China) Ma Quan		(substituted off) 77'
DF	5	(China) Bai Yi
DF	29	(China) Ma Yongkang (c)	(yellow card) 39' (yellow-red card) 85'
MF	7	(China) Xiao Zhanbo
MF	8	(China) Shi Hanjun		(substituted off) 32'
MF	9	(China) Jiang Feng
MF	18	(Croatia) Vladimir Petrović
MF	27	(China) Jiang Hui
FW	10	(China) Yao Xia		(substituted off) 64'
FW	20	(Croatia) Dragan Vukoja
Substitutes used:
MF	8	(China) Gao Ming		(substituted on) 32'
FW	20	(China) Sui Yong		(substituted on) 64'
MF	14	(China) Peng Peng		(substituted on) 77'
Manager:
(South Korea) Lee Jang-soo

Chinese Football Super Cup
2002 Winners
Dalian Shide
Third title
