= 2000 Chinese Football Super Cup =

| Dalian Shide | Chongqing Lifan |
| 4 | 1 |
- Date: 30 December 2000
- Venue: Hongkou Football Stadium, Shanghai
- Referee: Lu Jun

The 2000 LG Chinese Football Super Cup (Chinese: LG杯2000年度中国足球超霸杯赛) was the sixth Chinese Football Super Cup, contested by Chinese Jia-A League 2000 winners Dalian Shide and 2000 Chinese FA Cup winners Chongqing Lifan. Dalian Shide won their second title after winning 4–1.

== Match details ==
30 December 2000
15:00 UTC+8

| Dalian Shide | 4 – 1 | Chongqing Lifan |
|---|---|---|
| Hao Haidong 32'; Wang Peng 45+2', 69', 80' | Report | Luo Di 86' |

Hongkou Football Stadium, Shanghai
Referee: Lu Jun (Beijing)

| GK | 22 | (China) Chen Dong |
| CB | 27 | (China) Sun Jihai |
| CB | 12 | (China) Wang Sheng |
| CB | 16 | (China) Ji Mingyi |
| DM | 3 | (Brazil) Adilson |
| RM | 6 | (China) Li Ming | (substituted off) 64' |
| LM | 11 | (China) Yan Song |
| AM | 8 | (China) Wang Peng |
| AM | 10 | (Federal Republic of Yugoslavia) Miodrag Pantelić | (substituted off) 82' |
| FW | 9 | (China) Hao Haidong | (substituted off) 37' |
| FW | 10 | (Brazil) Orlando |
Substitutes used:
| MF | 24 | (China) Zhang Yalin | (substituted on) 37' |
| MF | 14 | (China) Hu Zhaojun | (substituted on) 64' |
| DF | 5 | (China) Xu Hong | (substituted on) 82' |
Manager:
(Federal Republic of Yugoslavia) Milorad Kosanović

| GK | 1 | (China) Fu Bin |
| CB | 3 | (China) Jiang Bin | (substituted off) 65' |
| CB | 12 | (China) Sun Qing |
| CB | 18 | (China) Jiang Hui |
| MF | 5 | (China) Jiang Feng |
| MF | 6 | (China) Zhao Lichun | (substituted off) 46' |
| MF | 15 | (China) Luo Di |
| MF | 21 | (China) Wei Xin |
| MF | 26 | (China) Huang Yunfeng | (substituted off) 32' |
| MF | 29 | (China) Liu Jingbiao |
| FW | 11 | (South Africa) Mark Williams |
Substitutes used:
| MF | 8 | (China) Xu Xin | (substituted on) 32' |
| MF | 7 | (China) Ma Ningbo | (substituted on) 46' |
| DF | 4 | (China) Zhou Lin | (substituted on) 65' |
Manager:
(South Korea) Lee Jang-soo

Chinese Football Super Cup
2000 Winners
Dalian Shide
Second title
