= Hao Haidong =

Chinese footballer (born 1970)

Personal information
- Date of birth: 9 May 1970 (age 56)
- Place of birth: Qingdao, Shandong, China
- Height: 1.80 m (5 ft 11 in)
- Position: Striker

Youth career
- 1980–1986: Bayi

Senior career*
Years	Team	Apps	(Gls)
1986–1996	Bayi	48	(19)
1997–2004	Dalian Shide	130	(78)
2005–2006	Sheffield United	0	(0)
Total		178	(97)

International career
1992–2004	China	106	(39)

Managerial career
- 2004: Dalian Shide (caretaker)
Medal record
Men's football
Representing China
AFC Asian Cup
Bronze medal – third place	1992 Japan	Team
Silver medal – second place	2004 China	Team
Asian Games
Bronze medal – third place	1998 Bangkok	Football
East Asian Football Championship
Bronze medal – third place	2003 Japan	Team
- * Club domestic league appearances and goals

Hao Haidong (simplified Chinese: 郝海东; traditional Chinese: 郝海東; pinyin: Hǎo Hǎidōng; born 9 May 1970) is a Chinese former international footballer who played as a forward. He holds the record for being China's top goalscorer.

As a player he represented Bayi Football Team, Dalian Shide and Sheffield United in a career that saw him win six league titles and two Chinese FA Cup. Along with a Chinese Football Association Player of the Year award and three Chinese Jia-A League Top goalscorer awards. Since retiring he had a brief spell at management with Dalian Shide and was the General manager at Hunan Shoking before being Chairman of Tianjin Songjiang, which he left in 2012. Hao married former badminton champion Ye Zhaoying in summer 2019.

== Club career ==
=== Bayi Football Team ===
Hao Haidong would make a name for himself by rising through the ranks with Bayi Football Team. On 31 July 1994, Hao was involved in an on-the-pitch brawl with Craig Allardyce, son of former English manager Sam Allardyce, in Bayi's league match with Guangdong Winnerway. This resulted in Hao and Allardyce receiving a half-year ban by the Chinese Football Association and thus Hao was not allowed to play for the Chinese national team in the 1994 Asian Games. While his personal performances with Bayi remained impressive, the team were not genuine title contenders anymore due to the club's struggles with professionalism and a requirement that all their players remain active People's Liberation Army members. With a significantly improved salary and a chance to win more silverware he would transfer to reigning league champions Dalian Shide at the beginning of the 1997 league season for a club record fee of 2,200,000 yuan at the time.

=== Dalian Shide ===
His move to Dalian Shide would be a huge success and he would win the league title and Chinese FA Super Cup as well as also personally winning the Golden Boot and Golden Ball award in the 1997 season. The following season, Hao would continue to add to his medal collection with another league title and more personal awards while barely losing the Asian Club Championship as well. While Hao would be applauded for his football achievements and was even starting to be known as the "Chinese Alan Shearer", he would also show a darker aspect of his game after being fined for attacking a player on 15 March 1998 and was suspended for two games. This would also be followed by a year suspension by the Asian Football Confederation for spitting at a referee during the Asian Cup Winners' Cup. Due to the suspension, Hao would miss out on much of the 1999 league season, however this wouldn't hinder him at all and his prolific goalscoring would continue to see him win several more league titles, the Chinese FA Cup and the Asian Cup Winners' Cup runners-up medal. His stature within Dalian Shide would be so high that when then manager Milorad Kosanović left the club, Hao was immediately brought in as a caretaker to manage the team during the absence of a full-time manager.

=== Sheffield United ===
In January 2005, Hao was nearing the end of his career and received the chance to play abroad as English Championship side Sheffield United were increasingly interested in gaining access to a potentially lucrative footballing market and saw Hao as a symbolic first step in achieving this. Dalian Shide would release him as a gesture of goodwill following his record of good service towards the club and Sheffield United decided to make the transfer symbolic when Hao joined them for a record low transfer fee at the time by signing for £1 in 2005. In January 2005, Hao joined Sheffield United where he suffered from injuries and worked mainly as a coach in United's academy. His only appearance came as a substitute in the 2005–06 FA Cup on 7 January 2006 in a 2–1 loss against Colchester United. With no further opportunities, Hao retired and returned to China.

== International career ==
Hao enjoyed a stellar international career by playing at the 2002 FIFA World Cup and is the record top goalscorer with 41 goals for the Chinese national team. Although China never made progress into Asia's final qualifying round 2006 (finished behind Kuwait), Hao led his country in a bid to reach Germany. Hao is considered to be the best striker from China in the past two decades.

Hao is the all-time leading goalscorer for Chinese national team de facto, with 40 goals. After political controversies occurred in 2020, Hao's data was removed from Chinese websites. The Chinese Football Association recognized Wu Lei is the all-time leading goalscorer for Chinese national team de jure, with 36 goals.

== Personal life ==
With his ex-wife Chen Yi, Hao has a son, Runze Hao (郝润泽), who is also a professional football player, and a daughter named Hao Runhan (郝润涵). Hao married former badminton champion Ye Zhaoying in summer 2019. As of 2022, Hao and Ye reside in Málaga, Spain.

== Political views ==
On 4 June 2020, on the 31st anniversary of the 1989 Tiananmen Square protests, Hao Haidong and his wife Ye Zhaoying publicly denounced the Chinese Communist Party, including for its mishandling of professional sports, Tibet, Hong Kong, and the COVID-19 pandemic. "Football in China is a reflection of the country ... it's not the players that make it worse, it's the bureaucrats that damage the whole business by ignoring the rules", they said. They advocated the formation of a "New Federal State of China", a proposal supported by Chinese dissident Miles Kwok and American political strategist Steve Bannon.

In response, the Chinese Communist Party first issued statements harshly criticizing Hao and Ye, and then altered course to expunge all references to them from the Chinese-accessible internet—the Weibo accounts of Hao and Ye were deleted, and their online profiles on major portals in China – Sina Sports and Tencent Sport – were expunged. Six days later, in an interview with The Wall Street Journal, Hao and Ye reiterated their criticism of one-party rule in China and restated their willingness to advocate for human rights despite potential political and personal costs: "There are many people who think the same way as we do but they don't dare to speak up inside the country – and they are becoming less and less willing to speak."

It is extremely rare, if not unprecedented, for a successful Chinese sports star to unleash such a blistering public denunciation of the Communist Party and openly call for its downfall. Dissidents who publicly criticize the party or demand democratic reforms often face lengthy prison sentences. Hao has been outspoken on social and sports issues, but had not directly challenged the Communist Party prior to this occasion.

== Career statistics ==
Scores and results list China's goal tally first, score column indicates score after each Hao goal.

List of international goals scored by Hao Haidong
No.	Date	Venue	Opponent	Score	Result	Competition
1	30 February 1992	Hiroshima Big Arch, Hiroshima, Japan	United Arab Emirates	1–1	1–1 (4–5 p)	1992 AFC Asian Cup
2	22 May 1993	Al Hassan Stadium, Irbid, Jordan	Pakistan	4–0	5–0	1994 FIFA World Cup qualification
3	12 June 1993	Chengdu Sports Centre, Chengdu, China	Pakistan	2–0	3–0	1994 FIFA World Cup qualification
4	26 October 1995	Workers' Stadium, Beijing, China	Colombia	1–0	2–1	Friendly
5	30 January 1996	Mong Kok Stadium, Hong Kong	Macau	6–1	7–1	1996 AFC Asian Cup qualification
6	1 February 1996	Mong Kok Stadium, Hong Kong	Philippines	1–0	7–0	1996 AFC Asian Cup qualification
7	1 February 1996	Mong Kok Stadium, Hong Kong	Philippines	2–0	7–0	1996 AFC Asian Cup qualification
8	1 February 1996	Mong Kok Stadium, Hong Kong	Philippines	4–0	7–0	1996 AFC Asian Cup qualification
9	28 June 1996	Workers' Stadium, Beijing, China	New Zealand	1–0	2–0	Friendly
10	25 September 1996	Dongdaemun Stadium, Seoul, South Korea	South Korea	1–0	1–3	Friendly
11	26 November 1996	Tianhe Stadium, Guangzhou, China	South Korea	1–1	2–3	Friendly
12	29 January 1997	Tuodong Stadium, Kunming, China	United States	1–0	2–1	Friendly
13	23 February 1997	Merdeka Stadium, Kuala Lumpur, Malaysia	Finland	2–1	2–1	1997 Dunhill Cup Malaysia
14	2 March 1997	Merdeka Stadium, Kuala Lumpur, Malaysia	Bosnia and Herzegovina	3–0	3–0	1997 Dunhill Cup Malaysia
15	20 April 1997	Workers' Stadium, Beijing, China	Myanmar	2–0	5–0	Friendly
16	11 May 1997	Pamir Stadium, Dushanbe, Tajikistan	Tajikistan	1–0	1–0	1998 FIFA World Cup qualification
17	25 May 1997	Thong Nhat Stadium, Ho Chi Minh City, Vietnam	Vietnam	3–1	3–1	1998 FIFA World Cup qualification
18	22 June 1997	Workers Stadium, Beijing, China	Vietnam	2–0	4–0	1998 FIFA World Cup qualification
19	26 September 1997	Jassim Bin Hamad Stadium, Doha, Qatar	Qatar	1–1	1–1	1998 FIFA World Cup qualification
20	10 October 1997	Kazma SC Stadium, Kuwait City, Kuwait	Kuwait	1–0	2–1	1998 FIFA World Cup qualification
21	6 November 1997	King Fahd Stadium, Riyadh, Saudi Arabia	Saudi Arabia	1–1	1–1	1998 FIFA World Cup qualification
22	27 June 1998	Rajamangala Stadium, Bangkok, Thailand	Thailand	3–0	3–0	Friendly
23	10 December 1998	Supachalasai Stadium, Bangkok, Thailand	Oman	1–0	6–1	1998 Asian Games
24	14 December 1998	Supachalasai Stadium, Bangkok, Thailand	Turkmenistan	2–0	3–0	1998 Asian Games
25	16 January 2000	Tianhe Stadium, Guangzhou, China	Uruguay	1–0	1–0	2000 Four Nations Tournament
26	23 January 2000	Thong Nhat Stadium, Ho Chi Minh City, Vietnam	Philippines	4–0	8–0	2000 AFC Asian Cup qualification
27	26 January 2000	Thong Nhat Stadium, Ho Chi Minh City, Vietnam	Guam	1–0	19–0	2000 AFC Asian Cup qualification
28	26 January 2000	Thong Nhat Stadium, Ho Chi Minh City, Vietnam	Guam	9–0	19–0	2000 AFC Asian Cup qualification
29	26 January 2000	Thong Nhat Stadium, Ho Chi Minh City, Vietnam	Guam	10–0	19–0	2000 AFC Asian Cup qualification
30	26 January 2000	Thong Nhat Stadium, Ho Chi Minh City, Vietnam	Guam	12–0	19–0	2000 AFC Asian Cup qualification
31	5 August 2001	Shanghai Stadium, Shanghai, China	Trinidad and Tobago	1–0	3–0	2001 Four Nations Tournament
32	25 August 2001	Shenyang Olympic Sports Center Stadium, Shenyang, China	United Arab Emirates	3–0	3–0	2002 FIFA World Cup qualification
33	13 October 2001	Shenyang Olympic Sports Center Stadium, Shenyang, China	Qatar	3–0	3–0	2002 FIFA World Cup qualification
34	3 February 2004	Tianhe Stadium, Guangzhou, China	Finland	2–1	2–1	Friendly
35	18 February 2004	Tianhe Stadium, Guangzhou, China	Kuwait	1–0	1–0	2006 FIFA World Cup qualification
36	31 March 2004	Siu Sai Wan Sports Ground, Hong Kong	Hong Kong	1–0	1–0	2006 FIFA World Cup qualification
37	9 June 2004	TEDA Football Stadium, Tianjin, China	Malaysia	1–0	4–0	2006 FIFA World Cup qualification
38	21 July 2004	Workers' Stadium, Beijing, China	Indonesia	2–0	5–0	2004 AFC Asian Cup
39	30 July 2004	Workers' Stadium, Beijing, China	Iraq	1–0	3–0	2004 AFC Asian Cup

== Honours ==
Bayi

- Chinese Jia-A League: 1986
- Chinese FA Cup: 1990

Dalian Shide

- Chinese Jia-A League: 1997, 1998, 2000, 2001, 2002
- Chinese FA Cup: 2001
- Chinese Super Cup: 1996, 2000, 2002

Individual

- Chinese Football Association Player of the Year: 1998
- Chinese Jia-A League Team of the Year: 2001
- Chinese Jia-A League Top goalscorer: 1997, 1998, 2001
- IFFHS Legends

== See also ==
- List of top international men's football goalscorers by country
- List of men's footballers with 100 or more international caps
