= 1999 Chinese Football Super Cup =

Shandong Luneng	Liaoning FC
2	4
- Date: 4 March 2000
- Venue: Hongkou Football Stadium, Shanghai
- Man of the Match: Qu Leheng (Liaoning FC)
- Referee: Lu Jun (Beijing)
- Weather: Light rain

The 1999 Chinese Football Super Cup (Chinese: 1999年度中国足球超霸杯赛) was the 5th Chinese Football Super Cup, contested by 1999 Chinese Jia-A League and 1999 Chinese FA Cup double winners Shandong Luneng Taishan and league runners-up Liaoning FC. Liaoning claimed their first title after winning 4–2.

== Match details ==
4 March 2000
15:50 UTC+8

Shandong Luneng Taishan	2–4	Liaoning FC
Li Xiaopeng 21'; Casiano 85'	Report	Xiao Zhanbo 9'; Qu Leheng 40', 58', 63'

Hongkou Football Stadium, Shanghai
Referee: Lu Jun (Beijing)

GK	1	(China) Wang Jun
CB	3	(China) Wang Chao
CB	4	(China) Hao Wei
CB	5	(China) Shu Chang	(substituted off) 72'
RM	15	(China) Fan Xuewei	(substituted off) 51'
CM	2	(China) Shao Yanjie
CM	16	(China) Gao Yao
CM	8	(China) Li Xiaopeng
LM	19	(China) Jiang Yong
CF	10	(China) Su Maozhen	(substituted off) 56'
CF	9	(Paraguay) Casiano Delvalle
Substitutes used:
MF	12	(China) Deng Cheng	(substituted on) 51'
FW	20	(China) Song Yuming	(substituted on) 56'
DF	21	(China) Tang Ming	(substituted on) 72'
Manager:
(Federal Republic of Yugoslavia) Slobodan Santrač

GK	1	(France) Fabrice Grange
CB	30	(China) Li Tie
CB	4	(China) Qu Dong
CB	5	(China) Xiao Zhanbo	(substituted off) 90+2'
RM	7	(China) Qu Leheng
CM	2	(China) Wang Gang
CM	9	(China) Zhao Junzhe
CM	6	(China) Lü Gang
LM	17	(China) Li Yao
CF	19	(China) Qu Shengqing
CF	29	(China) Li Jinyu
Substitutes used:
DF	16	(China) Yuan Zhe	(substituted on) 61'
MF	18	(China) Bai Guanghai	(substituted on) 78'
DF	15	(China) Wang Liang	(substituted on) 90+2'
Manager:
(China) Zhang Yin

Man of the Match:
(China) Qu Leheng (Liaoning FC)
Assistant referees:
Liu Tiejun (Beijing)
Zheng Weixiang (Guangzhou)
Fourth official:
Huang Junjie (Shanghai)

Chinese Football Super Cup
1999 Winners
Liaoning FC
First title
