= 1998 Chinese Football Super Cup =

| Dalian Wanda Shide | Shanghai Shenhua |
| 0 | 3 |
- Date: 7 March 1999
- Venue: Mianyang Nanhe Sports Centre Stadium, Mianyang
- Man of the Match: (Brazil) Marcelo
- Referee: Lu Jun

The 1998 Chinese Football Super Cup (Chinese: 1998年度中国足球超霸杯赛) was the 4th Chinese Football Super Cup, contested by Chinese Jia-A League 1998 winners Dalian Wanda Shide and 1998 Chinese FA Cup winners Shanghai Shenhua. Shanghai Shenhua beat Dalian Wanda Shide 3–0 and won their second Chinese Football Super Cup title.

== Match details ==
7 March 1999
14:30 UTC+8

| Dalian Wanda Shide | 0 – 3 | Shanghai Shenhua |
|---|---|---|
| | | Wu Chengying 55'; Marcelo 80', 86' |

Mianyang Nanhe Sports Centre Stadium, Mianyang
Referee: Lu Jun (Beijing)

Chinese Football Super Cup
1998 Winners
Shanghai Shenhua
Second title
