= Zhang Yaokun =

Chinese footballer (born 1981)

Zhang Yaokun 张耀坤
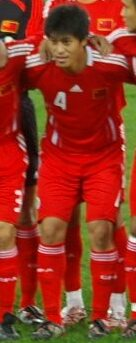

Personal information
- Full name: Zhang Yaokun
- Date of birth: 17 April 1981 (age 45)
- Place of birth: Dalian, Liaoning, China
- Height: 1.85 m (6 ft 1 in)
- Position: Defender

Team information
- Current team: China U16 (head coach)

Youth career
- 1997–1998: Dalian Yiteng

Senior career*
Years	Team	Apps	(Gls)
1998–2012	Dalian Shide	272	(16)
2005	→ Sichuan Guancheng (loan)	26	(1)
2013–2016	Guangzhou R&F	113	(1)
2017–2018	Wuhan Zall	48	(1)

International career^{‡}
2004–2009	China	39	(3)

Managerial career
- 2022–2023: Dalian Pro U17
- 2025: Liaoning U18
- 2025–2026: Dalian K'un City
- 2026–: China U16
Medal record
Representing China
Men's football
AFC Asian Cup
Silver medal – second place	2004 China	Team
East Asian Football Championship
Bronze medal – third place	2003 Japan	Team
Gold medal – first place	2005 South Korea	Team
AFC Youth Championship
Bronze medal – third place	2000 Iran	Team
- * Club domestic league appearances and goals as of 3 November 2018 ‡ National team caps and goals as of 31 October 2010

Zhang Yaokun (simplified Chinese: 张耀坤; traditional Chinese: 張耀坤; pinyin: Zhāng Yàokūn; born 17 April 1981) is a Chinese football coach and retired footballer.

== Club career ==
Zhang Yaokun started his football career in 1998 with Dalian Shide; however, due to an ankle fracture, he struggled to establish himself within the team and it was only once he overcame his long term injury did he start to become a regular. He later became an integral member of the defense and helped Dalian in their dominance within Chinese football by winning league titles in the 2001 season and the 2002 season as well as the Chinese FA Cup in 2001. After Dalian had a disappointing 2004 season, Vladimir Petrović came in as the new manager and would loan out Zhang to Sichuan Guancheng during the 2005 season where he quickly established himself as a key member of the club. He returned to Dalian the following season where he continued to be a key member of the squad and would go on to become their captain.

On 18 December 2012, Zhang transferred to fellow Chinese Super League side Guangzhou R&F. He made his debut for the club on 9 March 2013 in a 4-2 loss against Liaoning Whowin. On 26 February 2017, Zhang transferred to League One side Wuhan Zall.

On 12 November 2018, Zhang Yaokun publicly announced his retirement from professional football right after Wuhan Zall successfully promoted to Chinese Super League.

== Coaching career ==
On 14 December 2025, Zhang was appointed as the head coach and general manager of China League One club Dalian K'un City.

On 21 August 2026, Zhang was named as the new head coach of China U16.

== International career ==
Zhang was called-up to the Chinese national team for the 2004 AFC Asian Cup where he made several appearances coming on as a substitute and playing in numerous positions in defence. He continued to be a regular for the squad that qualified for the 2007 AFC Asian Cup and he and Li Weifeng were the first-choice centre back pairing during the tournament.

== Career statistics ==
=== Club statistics ===
As of 3 November 2018

Club performance			League		Cup		League Cup		Continental		Others		Total	
Season	Club	League	Apps	Goals	Apps	Goals	Apps	Goals	Apps	Goals	Apps	Goals	Apps	Goals
China PR			League		FA Cup		CSL Cup		Asia		Others		Total	
1998	Dalian Shide	Chinese Jia-A League	3	0		0	-		(Note: Appearances in Asian Club Championship)	0	0 (Note: Appearances in Chinese Football Super Cup)	0	3	0
1999	Dalian Shide	Chinese Jia-A League	8	0		0	-			0		0	8	0
2000	Dalian Shide	Chinese Jia-A League	0	0	0	0	-		(Note: Appearances in Asian Cup Winners' Cup)	1	-		0	0+1
2001	Dalian Shide	Chinese Jia-A League	10	0	4	0	-		1	0	-		15	0
2002	Dalian Shide	Chinese Jia-A League	27	0	1	0	-		3	0	2	0	33	0
2003	Dalian Shide	Chinese Jia-A League	27	0	6	0	-		5 (Note: Appearances in AFC Champions League)	0	4 (Note: Appearances in Chinese Football Super Cup and A3 Champions Cup)	0	42	0
2004	Dalian Shide	Chinese Super League	17	0	1	0	0	0	2	0	-		20	0
2005	Sichuan Guancheng	Chinese Super League	26	1	1	1	0	0	-		-		27	2
2006	Dalian Shide	Chinese Super League	24	3	5	0	-		5	1	3 (Note: Appearances in A3 Champions Cup)	0	37	4
2007	Dalian Shide	Chinese Super League	25	4	-		-		-		-		25	4
2008	Dalian Shide	Chinese Super League	26	4	-		-		-		-		26	4
2009	Dalian Shide	Chinese Super League	26	1	-		-		-		-		26	1
2010	Dalian Shide	Chinese Super League	26	1	-		-		-		-		26	1
2011	Dalian Shide	Chinese Super League	26	1	1	0	-		-		-		27	1
2012	Dalian Shide	Chinese Super League	27	2	1	0	-		-		-		28	2
2013	Guangzhou R&F	Chinese Super League	28	0	2	0	-		-		-		30	0
2014	Guangzhou R&F	Chinese Super League	29	0	2	0	-		-		-		31	0
2015	Guangzhou R&F	Chinese Super League	30	0	2	0	-		7	0	-		39	0
2016	Guangzhou R&F	Chinese Super League	26	1	6	0	-		-		-		32	1
2017	Wuhan Zall	China League One	26	1	0	0	-		-		-		26	1
2018	Wuhan Zall	China League One	22	0	0	0	-		-		-		22	0
Career total			459	19	32	1	0	0	23	1+1	9	0	523	21+1

=== International goals ===
Results list China's goal tally first.

#	Date	Venue	Opponent	Score	Competition
1	19 June 2005	Changsha, China	Costa Rica	2–2	Friendly international
2	2 June 2007	San Jose, United States	United States	1–4	Friendly international
3	28 October 2007	Kuala Lumpur, Malaysia	Myanmar	4–0	2010 FIFA World Cup qualifier

== Honours ==
=== Club ===
Dalian Shide

- Chinese Jia-A League: 1998, 2000, 2001, 2002
- Chinese FA Cup: 2001
- Chinese FA Super Cup: 2000, 2002

Wuhan Zall

- China League One: 2018

=== International ===
China PR national football team

- East Asian Football Championship: 2005

=== Individual ===
- Chinese Super League Team of the Year: 2004

Sporting positions
Preceded by Li Zhe	Guangzhou R&F F.C. captain 2013–2016	Succeeded by Jiang Zhipeng
