= Hu Zhaojun =

Chinese footballer

Hu Zhaojun 胡兆军
Personal information
- Date of birth: 1 March 1981 (age 45)
- Place of birth: Dalian, Liaoning, China
- Height: 1.82 m (5 ft 11 1/2 in)
- Position: Midfielder

Youth career
- 1996–1998: Dalian Yiteng

Senior career*
| Years | Team | Apps | (Gls) |
| 1999–2010 | Dalian Shide | 193 | (13) |
| 2009–2010 | → Guangzhou Evergrande (loan) | 29 | (1) |
| 2011 | Guangzhou Evergrande | 0 | (0) |
| 2011–2012 | Dalian Aerbin | 48 | (3) |
| 2013 | Beijing Baxy | 18 | (0) |
| 2014–2018 | Dalian Transcendence | 95 | (16) |
| 2018 | Zhejiang Yiteng | 12 | (1) |
| Total | | 395 | (34) |

International career^{‡}
| 2002–2008 | China | 6 | (0) |

Managerial career
- 2018: Zhejiang Yiteng (caretaker)
- 2021: China U-16 (assistant)
- 2022: Dalian Pro Youth
- 2023: Dalian Zhixing (assistant)
- 2024: Henan FC (analyst)
- 2025: Shanxi Chongde Ronghai
Medal record
Representing China
Men's football
AFC Youth Championship
| Bronze medal – third place | 2000 َ Iran | Team |
- * Club domestic league appearances and goals as of 3 November 2018 ‡ National team caps and goals as of 23 April 2008

Hu Zhaojun (Chinese: 胡兆军; pinyin: Hú Zhàojūn; Mandarin pronunciation: [xǔ ʈʂâʊ tɕýn]) is a Chinese football coach and former player.

== Club career ==
Hu Zhaojun is a defensive midfielder who started his career with Dalian Shide in 1999 where in his debut season he made six appearances. He subsequently established himself as a regular where he was known for his outstanding long-range shooting ability and excellent free kicks. During his time with Dalian he would play with one of the dominant teams in China and subsequently played a role in several league title wins. His loyalty at Dalian was cut short when the team had a terrible 2008 Chinese Super League season by fighting off relegation and many of the established stars within the team were dropped or later sold off by the recently employed manager Xu Hong. Zhaojun would sit in the reserves until Guangzhou F.C. took him on loan during the 2009 Chinese Super League season.

In February 2014, Hu transferred to Dalian Transcendence. He joined Zhejiang Yiteng on 11 July 2018.

On 30 June 2025, Hu was appointed as the head coach of Shanxi Chongde Ronghai.

== Career statistics ==
Statistics accurate as of match played 3 November 2018.

| Season | Club | League | League | | CFA Cup | | CSL Cup | | Asia | | Total | |
| Season | Club | League | Apps | Goals | Apps | Goals | Apps | Goals | Apps | Goals | Apps | Goals |
|---|---|---|---|---|---|---|---|---|---|---|---|---|
| 1999 | Dalian Shide | Chinese Jia-A League | 6 | 0 | ? | 0 | - | - | - | - | >=6 | 0 |
| 2000 | Dalian Shide | Chinese Jia-A League | 11 | 1 | ? | 0 | - | - | - | - | >=11 | 1 |
| 2001 | Dalian Shide | Chinese Jia-A League | 13 | 2 | ? | 0 | - | - | - | - | >=13 | 2 |
| 2002 | Dalian Shide | Chinese Jia-A League | 27 | 3 | ? | ? | - | - | - | - | >=27 | >=3 |
| 2003 | Dalian Shide | Chinese Jia-A League | 27 | 1 | ? | 0 | - | - | 5 | 0 | >=32 | 1 |
| 2004 | Dalian Shide | Chinese Super League | 21 | 2 | 2 | 0 | 2 | 1 | 2 | 0 | 27 | 3 |
| 2005 | Dalian Shide | Chinese Super League | 25 | 2 | 6 | 1 | 2 | 0 | - | - | 33 | 3 |
| 2006 | Dalian Shide | Chinese Super League | 12 | 1 | 1 | 0 | - | - | 6 | 0 | 19 | 1 |
| 2007 | Dalian Shide | Chinese Super League | 26 | 0 | - | - | - | - | - | - | 26 | 0 |
| 2008 | Dalian Shide | Chinese Super League | 25 | 1 | - | - | - | - | - | - | 25 | 1 |
| 2009 | Dalian Shide | Chinese Super League | 0 | 0 | - | - | - | - | - | - | 0 | 0 |
| 2009 | Guangzhou GPC | Chinese Super League | 13 | 0 | - | - | - | - | - | - | 13 | 0 |
| 2010 | Guangzhou Evergrande | China League One | 16 | 1 | - | - | - | - | - | - | 16 | 1 |
| 2011 | Dalian Aerbin | China League One | 24 | 3 | 1 | 0 | - | - | - | - | 25 | 3 |
| 2012 | Dalian Aerbin | Chinese Super League | 10 | 0 | 1 | 1 | - | - | - | - | 11 | 1 |
| 2013 | Beijing Baxy | China League One | 18 | 0 | 0 | 0 | - | - | - | - | 18 | 0 |
| 2014 | Dalian Transcendence | China League Two | 16 | 5 | 2 | 0 | - | - | - | - | 18 | 5 |
| 2015 | Dalian Transcendence | China League Two | 18 | 3 | 3 | 0 | - | - | - | - | 21 | 3 |
| 2016 | Dalian Transcendence | China League One | 25 | 2 | 0 | 0 | - | - | - | - | 25 | 2 |
| 2017 | Dalian Transcendence | China League One | 25 | 4 | 0 | 0 | - | - | - | - | 25 | 4 |
| 2018 | Dalian Transcendence | China League One | 11 | 2 | 0 | 0 | - | - | - | - | 11 | 2 |
| 2018 | Zhejiang Yiteng | China League One | 12 | 1 | 0 | 0 | - | - | - | - | 12 | 1 |
| Total | | | 395 | 34 | ≥11 | ≥2 | 4 | 1 | 13 | 0 | ≥423 | ≥37 |

== Honours ==
Dalian Shide

- Chinese Jia-A League/Chinese Super League: 2000, 2001, 2002, 2005
- Chinese FA Cup: 2001, 2005
- Chinese Super Cup: 2000, 2002

Guangzhou Evergrande

- China League One: 2010

Dalian Aerbin

- China League One: 2011
