= Sun Jihai =

Chinese footballer (born 1977)

Sun Jihai 孙继海
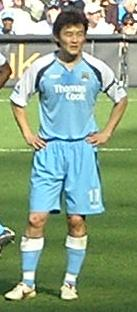
- Sun with Manchester City in 2007

Personal information
- Full name: Sun Jihai [孙继海]
- Date of birth: 30 September 1977 (age 49)
- Place of birth: Dalian, Liaoning, China
- Height: 1.83 m (6 ft 0 in)
- Position: Defender

Senior career*
Years	Team	Apps	(Gls)
1995–2002	Dalian Shide	123	(7)
1998–1999	→ Crystal Palace (loan)	23	(0)
2002–2008	Manchester City	130	(3)
2008–2010	Sheffield United	12	(0)
2009	→ Chengdu Blades (loan)	10	(0)
2010–2014	Guizhou Renhe	118	(1)
2015	Chongqing Lifan	28	(0)
2016	Beijing Renhe	9	(0)
Total		453	(11)

International career
1996–2008	China	80	(1)
Medal record
Men's football
Representing China
AFC Asian Cup
Silver medal – second place	2004 China	Team
Asian Games
Bronze medal – third place	1998 Bangkok	Football
East Asian Football Championship
Bronze medal – third place	2003 Japan	Team
- * Club domestic league appearances and goals

Sun Jihai
- Simplified Chinese: 孙继海
- Traditional Chinese: 孫繼海
Transcriptions
Standard Mandarin
- Hanyu Pinyin: Sūn Jìhǎi
- IPA: [swə́n tɕî xàɪ]

Sun Jihai (Chinese: 孙继海; pinyin: Sūn Jìhǎi; Mandarin pronunciation: [swə́n tɕî xàɪ]; born 30 September 1977) is a Chinese former professional footballer who played as a defender notably in the Premier League. Sun is one of the most well-known footballers in East Asia, as he is the first East Asian footballer to score in the Premier League when he scored a goal for Manchester City in 2002, and also the first Chinese footballer to score in the UEFA Cup. Sun was a member of the China national team that qualified for the 2002 FIFA World Cup.

Sun founded Beijing Haiqiu Technology Company (HQ Sports) in February 2016, while he still played for Beijing Renhe in the China League One division. Subsequently, in December of the same year, Sun ended his 22 years of professional football career by announcing his official retirement in a public event. Also at the same occasion, Sun announced the successful first round funding of his company, led by China Media Capital (CMC), Tencent and Yuan Xun Fund. HQ Sports has now developed to a staff force of more than 100 and with focus on Sports Technology, Media and Datatainment business in China and Worldwide.

== Club career ==
=== Dalian Shide ===
Sun Jihai started his football career with Dalian Shide in 1995 and made his first appearance on 28 May 1995 against Sichuan Quanxing. Like many of the top young Chinese players of his generation, he wanted to go to the Chinese youth training camp in Brazil that was sponsored by Jianlibao. However, he was not selected as he was not deemed to possess enough potential. Sun showed great character by not letting this huge disappointment derail him and worked very hard to establish himself at his club. Sun enjoyed a successful spell with Dalian as the club won four league titles and one Chinese FA Cup title during his time there.

=== Crystal Palace ===
After three successful years at Dalian Shide, Sun along with Fan Zhiyi signed for Crystal Palace in August 1998. They became the first ever Chinese footballers to play in the English leagues. Sun made his debut for Crystal Palace in a 3–0 loss against Bury in the first leg of a 1998–99 Football League Cup match. He was recalled by Dalian who struggled heavily at the bottom of the league in the 1999 season.

=== Manchester City ===
In February 2002, Sun signed for the English side Manchester City from Crystal Palace for £2 million and became the first Asian player to sign for the club. He made his debut for the club in a 4–2 win against Coventry City. His solid defence and dangerous attacking forays won over many City fans. He was voted the best player for the club in September 2002. In October 2002, Sun became the first East Asian footballer to score in the Premier League when he headed home the first goal in a 2–0 win over Birmingham City.

At the beginning of the 2004–05 season, Sun damaged his cruciate ligaments in a tackle with Chelsea striker Eiður Guðjohnsen and missed the rest of the season. After recuperating and following a strict physical regimen devised by his father, Sun re-installed his place as a regular in the club's starting lineup. In the 2006–07 season, Sun was set back yet again by another injury and he made his return on 10 February 2007, against Portsmouth which his side lost 2–1. With the arrival of Sven-Göran Eriksson as the new manager, Sun rarely played in the 2007–08 season. Sun played 14 games and only started 7 times in that season. He was replaced by Vedran Ćorluka at right back and Michael Ball played as the defensive substitute instead of Sun.

=== Sheffield United ===
On 2 July 2008, Sun signed a two-year deal with English Championship club Sheffield United. Sun only managed nineteen minutes in his first match for Sheffield United, getting sent off after picking up two yellows in a friendly. He went on to make his full debut in the opening fixture of the 2008–09 season against Birmingham City. He was sent off during a game against Coventry City after a lunging tackle from behind on opposing player Michael Mifsud. The Football Association charged him for his behavior after receiving a red card even with his past good disciplinary record and handed him an additional one-match ban. Having played regularly until November he succumbed to an injury and subsequently failed to force his way back into the first team and made only a handful of appearances in the FA Cup in the second half of the season. Sun was then released from his contract in July 2009 with Sheffield United claiming he had "failed to settle" in Yorkshire.

=== Return to China ===
In July 2009, Sun was loaned to Sheffield United's satellite team Chengdu Blades in the Chinese Super League, hoping to make an impact. He steadily established himself at Chengdu and helped them to achieve the club's best ever league position at seventh place. However, the club was relegated to China League One in the fallout of a match fixing scandal. He returned to Sheffield United after the loan was finished, but his contract ended and was left without a club to play for.

On 8 January 2010, Sun signed a two-year contract with fellow top tier side Shaanxi Chanba. He was promoted as the team captain immediately and he extended his contract for another two years in December 2011. At the beginning of the 2012 season, Sun followed the club when it decided to move to Guizhou and rename themselves Guizhou Renhe. He played nineteen league matches and five Chinese FA Cup matches in the 2012 season as the club achieved fourth place that league season and were runners-up in the cup which gained them entry into AFC Champions League for the first time in the club's history.

On 4 February 2015, Sun moved to fellow top tier side Chongqing Lifan on a free transfer. He made his debut for the club on 8 March 2014 in a 3–0 loss against Beijing Guoan.

On 8 December 2015, Sun returned to second tier side Beijing Renhe on a free transfer.

On 10 December 2016, Sun announced his retirement from football.

== International career ==
Sun made his international debut for the China national team on 6 December 1996 against Uzbekistan. At the 2002 FIFA World Cup in a group stage match against Costa Rica, Sun picked up an ankle injury after a tackle from behind by Mauricio Solís after just 17 minutes. Unable to play, Sun was replaced after 25 minutes and sat out the rest of the group stage, while Solís was only shown a yellow card. On 7 June 2008, during a 2010 FIFA World Cup qualification match against Qatar, Sun was shown a straight red card for dissent while he was warming up as a substitute on the bench. China lost the match 1–0. He was given a ban of five matches by FIFA and did not receive any call-ups to the national team after this incident.

== Career statistics ==
=== Club ===
Appearances and goals by club, season and competition
Club	Season	League			National cup (Note: Includes Chinese FA Cup, FA Cup.)		League cup (Note: Includes CSL Cup, Football League Cup.)		Continental		Total	
Club	Season	Division	Apps	Goals	Apps	Goals	Apps	Goals	Apps	Goals	Apps	Goals
Dalian Shide	1995	Chinese Jia-A League	13	0			–		–		13	0
Dalian Shide	1996	Chinese Jia-A League	21	0			–		–		21	0
Dalian Shide	1997	Chinese Jia-A League	19	0			–				19	0
Dalian Shide	1998	Chinese Jia-A League	18	1			–				18	1
Dalian Shide	1999	Chinese Jia-A League	8	1			–		–		8	1
Dalian Shide	2000	Chinese Jia-A League	21	2	1	0	–		2	0	24	2
Dalian Shide	2001	Chinese Jia-A League	23	3	4	0	–		1	0	28	3
Dalian Shide	Total		123	7								
Crystal Palace (loan)	1998–99	First Division	23	0	1	0	1	0	–		25	0
Manchester City	2001–02	First Division	7	0	0	0	0	0	–		7	0
Manchester City	2002–03	Premier League	28	2	1	0	2	0	–		31	2
Manchester City	2003–04	Premier League	33	1	3	0	1	0	5	1	42	2
Manchester City	2004–05	Premier League	6	0	0	0	1	0	–		7	0
Manchester City	2005–06	Premier League	29	0	4	0	1	0	–		34	0
Manchester City	2006–07	Premier League	13	0	1	0	0	0	–		14	0
Manchester City	2007–08	Premier League	14	0	0	0	2	0	–		16	0
Manchester City	Total		123	3	9	0	7	0	5	1	144	4
Sheffield United	2008–09	English Championship	12	0	4	0	1	0	–		17	0
Chengdu Blades	2009	Chinese Super League	10	0	–		–		–		10	0
Guizhou Renhe	2010	Chinese Super League	27	0	–		–		–		27	0
Guizhou Renhe	2011	Chinese Super League	20	0	3	0	–		–		23	0
Guizhou Renhe	2012	Chinese Super League	19	0	5	0	–		–		24	0
Guizhou Renhe	2013	Chinese Super League	28	1	5	0	–		6	1	39	2
Guizhou Renhe	2014	Chinese Super League	24	0	2	0	–		5	0	31	0
Guizhou Renhe	Total		118	1	15	0	0	0	11	1	144	2
Chongqing Lifan	2015	Chinese Super League	28	0	0	0	–		–		28	0
Beijing Renhe	2016	China League One	9	0	0	0	–		–		9	0
Career total			453	11	34	0	9	0	19	2	515	13

=== International ===
Appearances and goals by national team and year
National team	Year	Apps	Goals
China	1996	5	0
China	1997	22	0
China	1998	12	0
China	2000	2	0
China	2001	11	0
China	2002	4	0
China	2003	3	0
China	2004	11	1
China	2005	2	0
China	2007	5	0
China	2008	3	0
Total		80	1

Score and result list China's goal tally first, score column indicates score after Sun goal.

International goal scored by Sun Jihai
No.	Date	Venue	Opponent	Score	Result	Competition
1	9 June 2004	Worker's Stadium, Beijing, China	Malaysia	2–0	4–0	2006 FIFA World Cup qualifier

== Honours ==
Dalian Shide

- Chinese Jia-A League: 1996, 1997, 2000, 2001
- Chinese FA Cup: 2001
- Chinese FA Super Cup: 1997, 2000

Manchester City

- Football League First Division: 2001–02

Guizhou Renhe

- Chinese FA Cup: 2013
- Chinese FA Super Cup: 2014

Individual

- Chinese Football Association Young Player of the Year: 1998
- Chinese Jia-A League Team of the Year: 1997, 2001
- Chinese FA Super Cup Most Valuable Player: 2014
- English Football Hall of Fame Special Category: 2015
- IFFHS Legends
