= Qu Bo (footballer) =

Chinese footballer (born 1981)

Qu Bo 曲波

Personal information
- Full name: Qu Bo
- Date of birth: 15 July 1981 (age 45)
- Place of birth: Tianjin, China
- Height: 1.81 m (5 ft 11 1/2 in)
- Positions: Striker; winger

Youth career
- 1997–1999: Tianjin Locomotive

Senior career*
Years	Team	Apps	(Gls)
2000–2009	Qingdao Jonoon	201	(51)
2010–2014	Guizhou Renhe	106	(27)
2014–2015	Qingdao Hainiu	19	(2)
2016	Tianjin Teda	2	(0)

International career^{‡}
2000–2001	China U-20	10	(6)
2001–2013	China	78	(18)

Managerial career
- 2023–: Qingdao Quickboy
Medal record
Representing China
Men's football
EAFF Championship
Bronze medal – third place	2008 China	Team
Gold medal – first place	2010 Japan	Team
Silver medal – second place	2013 South Korea	Team
AFC Youth Championship
Bronze medal – third place	2000 َ Iran	Team
- * Club domestic league appearances and goals as of 30 October 2016 ‡ National team caps and goals as of 1 November 2014

Qu Bo (Chinese: 曲波; pinyin: Qū Bō; born 15 July 1981) is a Chinese football manager and former player who is currently the manager and chairman of Qingdao Quickboy.

== Club career ==
Qu Bo started his football career playing for Tianjin Locomotive's youth team where he was spotted by and then transferred to top-tier side Qingdao Jonoon in 2000. He would quickly establish himself as an exciting young player and go on to play in seventeen league games while scoring eight goals, which would be enough to personally win the Chinese Football Association Young Player of the Year award at the end of the 2000 league season. Qu would continue to be a vital member of the team and after playing in the 2002 FIFA World Cup where he would draw considerable interest from Premier League club Tottenham Hotspur where he had a month-long stint with them before leaving due to the lack of a work permit. On his return to Qingdao, he would show his importance to the team by helping the team win the club's first ever Chinese FA Cup at the end of the 2002 league season.

On 22 February 2010, after spending ten years at Qingdao, Qu transferred to top-tier side Shaanxi Chanba. He soon made his debut for the club in a league game against Dalian Shide on 28 March 2010 in a 1–1 draw. After waiting several months, he would eventually score his first goal for the club on 14 July 2010 in a 2–1 win against Shanghai Shenhua. At the beginning of the 2012 season, Qu followed the club when it decided to move to Guizhou and rename themselves Guizhou Renhe.

On 3 June 2014, Qu transferred to China League One side Qingdao Hainiu. He made his debut for the club on 19 July 2014 in a 4–1 loss to Shijiazhuang Yongchang and scored his first goal for the club on 27 July 2014 in a 2–1 win against Chengdu Tiancheng.

On 5 January 2016, Qu transferred to his hometown club Tianjin Teda in the Chinese Super League. He announced his retirement on 2 March 2017.

== International career ==
Qu's lightning pace first caught the eye of many at the 2000 AFC Youth Championship where he scored four goals for his country. After playing in the 2001 FIFA World Youth Championship, he would quickly catch the attention of Bora Milutinović who included him into the 2002 FIFA World Cup squad where he preferred to place Qu at the wing so he can get the best out of the young prospect's pace. Following his initial rise to the national team, Qu had difficulty in retaining his position as a consistent member of the team. He was not selected for the 2004 AFC Asian Cup squad and was forced out with injury in the 2007 AFC Asian Cup squad. He was however brought back to the national team for several qualifying games and worked his way back into the side. He represented China for the final time in 2013.

== Managerial career ==
Qu was the founder and current manager of youth football club Qingdao Quickboy.

== Career statistics ==
=== International ===
Appearances and goals by national team and year
National team	Year	Apps	Goals
China	2001	12	3
China	2002	9	1
China	2007	4	2
China	2008	17	4
China	2009	12	4
China	2010	12	3
China	2011	7	1
China	2013	5	0
Total		78	18

Scores and results list China's goal tally first, score column indicates score after each Bo goal.

List of international goals scored by Qu Bo
No.	Date	Venue	Opponent	Score	Result	Competition	Ref.
1	27 January 2001	Oakland Coliseum, Oakland, United States	United States	1–2	1–2	Friendly	
2	6 May 2001	RCAF Old Stadium, Phnom Penh, Cambodia	Cambodia	2–0	4–0	2002 FIFA World Cup qualification	
3	13 October 2001	Wulihe Stadium, Shenyang, China	Qatar	2–0	3–0	2002 FIFA World Cup qualification	
4	12 December 2002	Bahrain National Stadium, Riffa, Bahrain	Bahrain	2–2	2–2	Friendly	
5	21 October 2007	Century Lotus Stadium, Foshan, China	Myanmar	1–0	7–0	2010 FIFA World Cup qualification	
6	21 October 2007	Century Lotus Stadium, Foshan, China	Myanmar	7–0	7–0	2010 FIFA World Cup qualification	
7	27 January 2008	Tianhe Stadium, Guangzhou, China	Syria	1–0	2–1	Friendly	
8	15 March 2008	Tuodong Stadium, Kunming, China	Thailand	1–0	3–3	Friendly	
9	23 March 2008	L.A. Coliseum, Los Angeles, United States	El Salvador	2–2	2–2	Friendly	
10	17 December 2008	Sultan Qaboos Stadium, Muscat, Oman	Oman	–	1–3	Friendly	
11	14 January 2009	Aleppo International Stadium, Aleppo, Syria	Syria	1–3	2–3	2011 AFC Asian Cup qualification	
12	18 July 2009	Tianjin Olympic Centre, Tianjin, China	Palestine	1–0	1–3	Friendly	
13	30 September 2009	Hohhot People's Stadium, Hohhot, China	Botswana	2–0	4–1	Friendly	
14	14 November 2009	Beirut Municipal Stadium, Beirut, Lebanon	Lebanon	2–0	2–0	2011 AFC Asian Cup qualification	
15	14 February 2000	National Stadium, Tokyo, Japan	Hong Kong	1–0	2–0	2010 East Asian Football Championship	
16	14 February 2000	National Stadium, Tokyo, Japan	Hong Kong	2–0	2–0	2010 East Asian Football Championship	
17	26 June 2010	Tuodong Stadium, Kunming, China	Tajikistan	3–0	4–0	Friendly	
18	28 July 2011	New Laos National Stadium, Vientiane, Laos	Laos	1–0	6–1	2014 FIFA World Cup qualification	

== Honours ==
Qingdao Jonoon

- Chinese FA Cup: 2002

Guizhou Renhe

- Chinese FA Cup: 2013
- Chinese FA Super Cup: 2014

China

- East Asian Football Championship: 2010

Individual

- Chinese Football Association Young Player of the Year: 2000
- Chinese Super League Team of the Year: 2009

== Personal life ==
Qu Bo and Zhu Yanxiang (朱燕翔) married on 11 November 2011. On 26 January 2014, they had a boy named Qu Jiahe (Chinese: 曲嘉禾).
