= Zhao Junzhe =

Chinese footballer

Zhao Junzhe 肇俊哲
Personal information
- Full name: Zhao Junzhe
- Date of birth: 19 April 1979 (age 47)
- Place of birth: Shenyang, Liaoning, China
- Height: 1.83 m (6 ft 0 in)
- Position: Midfielder

Youth career
- 1985–1997: Liaoning FC

Senior career*
Years	Team	Apps	(Gls)
1998–2016	Liaoning FC	405	(51)

International career^{‡}
1998–2008	China	71	(2)

Managerial career
- 2017: Liaoning FC (caretaker)
- 2022: China (assistant)
- 2022: Guangzhou City (caretaker)
- 2023–2024: Cangzhou Mighty Lions
Medal record
Men's football
Representing China
AFC Asian Cup
Silver medal – second place	2004 China	Team
Asian Games
Bronze medal – third place	1998 Bangkok	Football
East Asian Football Championship
Bronze medal – third place	2003 Japan	Team
Bronze medal – third place	2008 China	Team
- * Club domestic league appearances and goals as of 10 September 2016 ‡ National team caps and goals as of 30 October 2016

Zhao Junzhe (Chinese: 肇俊哲; pinyin: Zhào Jùnzhé; born 19 April 1979) is a Chinese football coach and former professional footballer who was most recently the manager of Chinese Super League club Cangzhou Mighty Lions. He spent his entire playing career at Liaoning FC. He's related to the ruling clan of the former Qing imperial dynasty, the Aisin-Gioro clan.

== Club career ==
Zhao Junzhe was promoted to Liaoning F.C.'s first team from the club's youth academy and made his debut in the 1998 season. He continued to be a vital member for Liaoning that season when he aided them to being runners-up and the Chinese FA Cup. He was soon promoted to club captain and won the Chinese Football Association Player of the Year award in 2004. The following seasons saw the club's fortunes fall and Zhao unfortunately led the team to relegation to the second tier at the end of the 2008 season. Despite this setback, he remained with the team and immediately led Liaoning back up to the top tier when they won the second tier title in the 2009 season. Zhao announced his retirement from football at the end of the 2016 season. On 30 October 2016, he made last appearance in his career in a league match against Jiangsu Suning.

== International career ==
Zhao was included into the Chinese national team by then manager Bora Milutinović for the 2002 FIFA World Cup. Though his chances were limited on the national team at the time, he did play in two group stage matches during the tournament and nearly scored by hitting the post against Brazil. He played a vital role in the 2004 AFC Asian Cup in which China finished the tournament as runners-up.

== Managerial career ==
On 29 September 2017, Zhao was appointed as the caretaker manager of Liaoning FC, who sat at the bottom of the league table. On 14 October, in his first game as manager, he guided Liaoning to a 3–3 draw against second place team Shanghai SIPG. However, Liaoning finally relegated to the second tier after losing the last three matches of the season. On 12 December 2017, Zhao's caretaker spell ended when Chen Yang became the manager of Liaoning.

On 21 February 2023, Zhao was appointed as the head coach of Chinese Super League club Cangzhou Mighty Lions. On 16 July 2024, he swapped positions with Li Xiaopeng to become the team's general manager.

== Career statistics ==
=== Club ===
As of 30 October 2016

Club performance			League		Cup		League Cup		Continental		Others		Total	
Season	Club	League	Apps	Goals	Apps	Goals	Apps	Goals	Apps	Goals	Apps	Goals	Apps	Goals
China PR			League		FA Cup		CSL Cup		Asia		Others		Total	
1998	Liaoning F.C.	Chinese Jia-B League		3			-	-	-	-	-	-		3
1999	Liaoning F.C.	Chinese Jia-A League	25	3	0	0	-	-	-	-	-	-	25	3
2000	Liaoning F.C.	Chinese Jia-A League	24	4	4	1	-	-	-	-	1 (Note: Appearances in Chinese Football Super Cup)	0	29	5
2001	Liaoning F.C.	Chinese Jia-A League	25	4	1	1	-	-	-	-	-	-	26	5
2002	Liaoning F.C.	Chinese Jia-A League	27	3	5	1	-	-	-	-	-	-	32	4
2003	Liaoning F.C.	Chinese Jia-A League	27	5	3	3	-	-	-	-	-	-	30	8
2004	Liaoning F.C.	Chinese Super League	21	3	1	0	0	0	-	-	-	-	22	3
2005	Liaoning F.C.	Chinese Super League	15	0	2	1	3	0	-	-	-	-	20	1
2006	Liaoning F.C.	Chinese Super League	28	3	1	0	-	-	-	-	-	-	29	3
2007	Liaoning F.C.	Chinese Super League	28	4	-	-	-	-	-	-	-	-	28	4
2008	Liaoning F.C.	Chinese Super League	29	4	-	-	-	-	-	-	-	-	29	4
2009	Liaoning F.C.	China League One	24	5	-	-	-	-	-	-	-	-	24	5
2010	Liaoning F.C.	Chinese Super League	29	0	-	-	-	-	-	-	-	-	29	0
2011	Liaoning F.C.	Chinese Super League	28	5	0	0	-	-	-	-	-	-	28	5
2012	Liaoning F.C.	Chinese Super League	26	4	4	1	-	-	-	-	-	-	30	5
2013	Liaoning F.C.	Chinese Super League	24	1	1	0	-	-	-	-	-	-	25	1
2014	Liaoning F.C.	Chinese Super League	20	3	1	0	-	-	-	-	-	-	21	3
2015	Liaoning F.C.	Chinese Super League	2	0	0	0	-	-	-	-	-	-	2	0
2016	Liaoning F.C.	Chinese Super League	3	0	0	0	-	-	-	-	-	-	3	0
Career total			405	51	23	8	3	0	0	0	1	0	432	59

=== International ===
National team
Year	Apps	Goals
1998	8	1
1999	0	0
2000	0	0
2001	0	0
2002	10	1
2003	8	0
2004	20	0
2005	5	0
2006	8	0
2007	5	0
2008	7	0
Total	71	2

=== International goals ===
Results list China's goal tally first.

Date	Venue	Opponent	Result	Competition
8 December 1998	Bangkok, Thailand	Tajikistan	3–1	1998 Asian Games
7 December 2002	Manama, Bahrain	Syria	3–1	Friendly international

=== Managerial statistics ===
As of 15 July 2024.

Team	Nat	From	To	Record				
Team	Nat	From	To	G	W	D	L	Win %
Liaoning F.C. (caretaker)	(China)	29 September 2017	12 December 2017	4	0	1	3	0.00
Cangzhou Mighty Lions	(China)	21 February 2023	15 July 2024	51	12	12	27	23.53
Total				55	12	13	30	21.82

== Honours ==
=== Player ===
==== Club ====
Liaoning Whowin

- China League One: 2009
- Chinese FA Super Cup: 1999

==== Individual ====
- AFC Asian Cup All-Star Team: 2004
- Chinese Football Association Player of the Year: 2004
- Chinese Super League Team of the Year: 2002, 2003

== Personal life ==
Zhao is of Manchu ethnicity from Aisin Gioro clan. He is a descendant of Boolungga, who is the brother of Giocangga.
