= Mao Yijun =

Chinese footballer

Mao Yijun 毛毅军
Personal information
- Full name: Mao Yijun
- Date of birth: 28 December 1970 (age 55)
- Place of birth: Shanghai, China
- Height: 1.86 m (6 ft 1 in)
- Position: Right back

Senior career*
Years	Team	Apps	(Gls)
1994–2002	Shanghai Shenhua	153	(1)
Total		153	(1)

International career
1997	China	9	(1)

Managerial career
- 2004: Shanghai Shenhua (interim)
- 2021–2022: Shanghai Shenhua (caretaker)
- 2022–: Shanghai Shenhua (team manager)
- 2026: Shanghai Shenhua (caretaker)
- * Club domestic league appearances and goals

Mao Yijun (simplified Chinese: 毛毅军; traditional Chinese: 毛毅軍; pinyin: Máo Yìjūn; born 28 December 1970) is a Chinese football coach and former footballer.

== Club career ==
Mao spent his entire career with hometown club Shanghai Shenhua, winning the 1995 Jia-A League, 1998 Chinese FA Cup and the 1995 and 1998 editions of the Chinese FA Super Cup during his eight-year career at the club.

== International career ==
On 4 May 1997, Mao made his debut for China in a 4–1 win against Turkmenistan.

=== International goals ===
Scores and results list China's goal tally first.

#	Date	Venue	Opponent	Score	Result	Competition
1	17 October 1997	Azadi Stadium, Tehran, Iran	Iran	1–4	1–4	1998 FIFA World Cup qualification

== Coaching career ==
Following his retirement, Mao took up an assistant coaching role with Shanghai Shenhua from 2003 to 2006, taking up an interim managerial role from January to March 2004, before Howard Wilkinson's appointment. In September 2009, after a brief spell back as assistant manager of Shanghai Shenhua in 2008, Yijun was appointed assistant manager of Huangzhou Greentown. In July 2012, Mao returned to Shanghai Shenhua's coaching team.

On 3 August 2026, Mao was named as caretaker of Shanghai Shenhua again after Leonid Slutsky left his position.
