= Runze Hao =

Chinese footballer

Personal information
- Date of birth: 3 May 1997 (age 29)
- Place of birth: Dalian, Liaoning, China
- Height: 1.88 m (6 ft 2 in)
- Position: Defender

Youth career
- 2013: Beijing Guoan
- 2013–2015: Albacete
- 2015–2016: Lokomotiva Zagreb

Senior career*
Years	Team	Apps	(Gls)
2016–2017	Lokomotiva Zagreb	0	(0)
2017–2019	Recreativo Granada	0	(0)
2017–2019	→ Recreativo Granada II	4	(1)
2019	→ Louletano (loan)	0	(0)
2020	Radnički Niš	1	(1)
- * Club domestic league appearances and goals as of 31 May 2020

Runze Hao (Chinese: 郝润泽, born 3 May 1997) is a Chinese professional footballer who plays as a defender. The last team that he played for was Radnički Niš in the Serbian SuperLiga. He is the son of Hao Haidong, who is the all-time top scorer of the Chinese national team.

== Career ==
Born in Dalian, he played in the youth team of Beijing Guoan before he moved abroad in 2013 and joined the youth team of Spanish side Albacete where he played two seasons. In 2015, he joined Croatian side NK Lokomotiva Zagreb where, after spending a season playing with youth team, he was upgraded to the main team, but failed to make a debut. In 2017, he signed with Spanish side Recreativo Granada playing most of the time with their reserves team while there. He also spent half season on loan with Portuguese side Louletano D.C. in 2019 before returning to Granada and being signed in summer 2019 by Serbian side Radnički Niš. He made his debut in the 2019–20 Serbian SuperLiga on 31 May 2020, with a goal. Hao started for Radnički Niš in the Serbian Cup quarter final against FK Čukarički on 4 June 2020. He was replaced by Uroš Miloradović at half time. Radnički Niš lost the game 3–2. On 9 June 2020, it was confirmed that Hao was released by Radnički Niš. Amid media speculations that Hao was released due to political pressure from China, Radnički Niš denied the speculations and claimed that Hao left the club after his contract expired on 30 May despite appearing in two matches the following days after.
