= 1996 Chinese Football Super Cup =

Dalian Wanda	Beijing Guoan
3	2
- Date: 9 March 1997
- Venue: Shenzhen Stadium, Shenzhen
- Man of the Match: Wang Tao

The 1996 Chinese Football Super Cup (Chinese: 1996年中国足球超霸杯赛) was the 2nd Chinese Football Super Cup, contested by Chinese Jia-A League 1996 winners Dalian Wanda and 1996 Chinese FA Cup winners Beijing Guoan. Dalian Wanda beat Beijing Guoan 3–2 at Shenzhen Stadium, thus winning their first Chinese Football Super Cup title.

== Match details ==
9 March 1997

Dalian Wanda	3 – 2	Beijing Guoan
Wang Tao 40', 45' (pen.); Li Ming 64'		Yang Chen 2'; Xie Feng 60' (pen.)

Shenzhen Stadium, Shenzhen

Chinese Football Super Cup
1996 Winners
Dalian Wanda
First title
