= Mianyang Nanhe Sports Centre Stadium =

Sports venue in Mianyang, Sichuan, China

Coordinates: 31°27′02″N 104°45′00″E

Nanhe Stadium
- Interactive map of Nanhe Stadium
- Full name: Mianyang Nanhe Sports Centre Stadium
- Location: Mianyang, China
- Capacity: 30,000

Mianyang Nanhe Sports Centre Stadium (绵阳南河体育中心体育场) is a multi-purpose stadium in Mianyang, China. Located in Fucheng District, It is currently used mostly for football matches. The stadium holds 30,000 spectators.
