= Li Ming (footballer, born 1971) =

Chinese footballer and coach

Li Ming 李明
Personal information
- Date of birth: 26 January 1971 (age 55)
- Place of birth: Dalian, Liaoning, China
- Height: 1.81 m (5 ft 11 in)
- Position: Midfielder

Senior career*
Years	Team	Apps	(Gls)
1989–2005	Dalian Wanda	244	(36)

International career
1992–2004	China	86	(8)

Managerial career
- 2013: Dalian Aerbin (caretaker)
- 2015–2018: China U20
- 2017–2025: Beijing Guoan (general manager)
Medal record
Men's football
Representing China
AFC Asian Cup
Bronze medal – third place	1992 Japan	Team
Silver medal – second place	2004 China	Team
Asian Games
Silver medal – second place	1994 Hiroshima	Football
AFC U-16 Championship
Bronze medal – third place	1988 Thailand	Team
- * Club domestic league appearances and goals as of 13 December 2024

Li Ming (Chinese: 李明; pinyin: Lǐ Míng; born 26 January 1971) is a Chinese football coach and a former international player.

As a footballer, he played as a midfielder and spent his whole career with Dalian Wanda where he won eight league titles and three Chinese FA Cups. His international career saw him play for the Chinese national team gathering 86 international appearances between 1992 and 2004, scoring 8 goals. He represented his nation at four editions of the AFC Asian Cup, helping his team to a third-place finish in 1992, the quarter-finals in 1996, a fourth-place finish in 2000 and a second-place finish in 2004, which China hosted.

== Playing career ==
Li Ming was born in Dalian, Liaoning. Starting his football career in 1989, Li Ming would spend his entire football career with Dalian Wanda. He soon established himself as the club's first choice right-midfielder, however it was not until the 1994 league season that Dalian would win their first professional league title. With the help of Li Ming, the club soon established themselves as the dominant team within China for several seasons. From 1994 to 2002 Dalian would win a staggering eight league titles; Li Ming was one of the stars of the Dalian Wanda team that went the entire 1996 league season without losing a single domestic league game. Li missed out on China's maiden appearance at the 2002 FIFA World Cup due to an injury during the qualification campaign.

== Management career ==
In 2017, Li was appointed as the general manager of Beijing Guoan. On 27 December 2025, the club announced Li's departure after the 2025 season.

== Personal life ==
His son, Li Sirong, also went on to be a footballer.

== Career statistics ==
=== International goals ===
#	Date	Venue	Opponent	Score	Result	Competition
1.	23 February 1997	Malaysia	Finland	2–1	Won	1997 Dunhill Cup Malaysia
2.	28 February 1997	Malaysia	Zimbabwe	3–1	Won	1997 Dunhill Cup Malaysia
3.	13 September 1997	Dalian, China PR	Iran	2–4	Lost	1998 FIFA World Cup qualification
4.	16 October 2000	Tripoli, Lebanon	Indonesia	4–0	Won	2000 AFC Asian Cup Group Stages
5.	23 October 2000	Sidon, Lebanon	Qatar	3–1	Won	2000 AFC Asian Cup Quarter-finals
6.	3 July 2004	China	Lebanon	6–0	Won	Friendly
7.	21 July 2004	Beijing, China PR	Indonesia	5–0	Won	2004 AFC Asian Cup Group Stages
8.	7 August 2004	Beijing, China PR	Japan	1–3	Lost	2004 AFC Asian Cup Finals

== Honours ==
=== Player ===
Dalian Wanda

- Chinese Jia-A League/Chinese Super League: 1994, 1996, 1997, 1998, 2000, 2001, 2002, 2005
- Chinese FA Cup: 1992, 2001, 2005

=== Individual ===
- Golden Foot: 2017, as a legend

Preceded by (England) Paul Rideout (Qianwei Huangdao)	Chinese Football Association EMS Quickest Goal; 1998	Succeeded by (Brazil) Marcelo Sergipano (Shanghai Shenhua)
