= Mate Šestan =

Croatian footballer (1971–2023)

Personal information
- Date of birth: 12 February 1971
- Place of birth: SFR Yugoslavia
- Date of death: 30 March 2023 (aged 52)
- Place of death: Zadar, Croatia
- Position: Forward

Senior career*
Years	Team	Apps	(Gls)
1992	Zadar	21	(6)
1993	Dubrava	7	(0)
1994	NK Zagreb	5	(0)
1994	Zadar	13	(2)
1995	Neretva	10	(0)
1995–1996	Marsonia	15	(3)
1996–1997	Copenhagen	30	(4)
1997–1998	Levante	22	(2)
1999	Hammarby	11	(4)
2000	Xiamen Xiaxin		
2000	Jilin Aodong		
2001	Šibenik	4	(0)
- * Club domestic league appearances and goals

Mate Šestan (12 February 1971 – 30 March 2023) was a Croatian professional footballer who played as a forward.

== Career ==
Šestan played as a forward for numerous clubs, including Swedish Hammarby IF, Danish F.C. Copenhagen, Spanish Levante UD and Chinese Xiamen Xiaxin. Known for his fiery temper, he scored 7 goals in 35 games for Copenhagen.

== Personal life and death ==
Šestan was born on 12 February 1971. He died on 30 March 2023, at the age of 52.
