= Yan Song (footballer) =

Chinese footballer

Yan Song 阎嵩
Personal information
- Date of birth: 20 March 1981 (age 45)
- Place of birth: Dalian, Liaoning, China
- Height: 1.82 m (6 ft 0 in)
- Position: Midfielder

Senior career*
Years	Team	Apps	(Gls)
1999–2007	Dalian Shide	185	(27)
2008–2009	Hangzhou Greentown	51	(5)
2010	Jeju United	0	(0)
2011–2012	Dalian Shide	11	(0)
2012–2013	Shanghai Shenhua	3	(0)
2014–2015	Dalian Transcendence	15	(2)

International career^{‡}
2002–2007	China	19	(1)
Medal record
Representing China
Men's football
AFC Asian Cup
Silver medal – second place	2004 China	Team
AFC Youth Championship
Bronze medal – third place	2000 َ Iran	Team
- * Club domestic league appearances and goals as of 10 October 2015 ‡ National team caps and goals as of 30 October 2012

Yan Song (simplified Chinese: 阎嵩; traditional Chinese: 閻嵩; pinyin: Yán Sōng) is a Chinese former professional footballer who played as a midfielder.

He began his senior career with Dalian Shide F.C. where he won several Chinese league titles before he was called up to represent the Chinese senior team and help guide them to a runners-up spot in the 2004 AFC Asian Cup. He also played for Hangzhou Greentown, Jeju United FC, Shanghai Shenhua and Dalian Transcendence.

== Club career ==
Yan Song started his professional football career with Dalian Shide F.C. in the 1999 league season and made an immediate impact in establishing himself within the team by playing in twenty league games and scoring four goals. The following season under a new manager in Milorad Kosanović Yan's career within the club thrived; he went on to win his first league title with the club. Over the next several seasons Yan continued to establish himself as the team's attacking left-winger, winning four league championships and twice winning the Chinese FA Cup with Dalian Shide overall.

Yan Song transferred to Zhejiang Lücheng at the beginning of the 2008 Chinese Super League season where he established himself as a regular playing in twenty-six league games and scoring four goals.

In February 2010 Yan moved to South Korea to join K-League club Jeju United, becoming the fourth Chinese footballer in K-League history. The move itself turned out to be a personal disaster, while Jeju United had a relatively successfully season Yan was completely dropped from the squad and the manager Park Kyung-Hoon only played in one Korean FA Cup. The following season Yan returned to Dalian Shide at the beginning of the 2011 league season, however his return was not very successful and he only made a handful of games before he moved to top-tier club Shanghai Shenhua halfway through the 2012 league season.

In February 2014, Yan transferred to Dalian Transcendence.

== International career ==
Yan Song made his international debut on 12 December 2002 when the Head coach Arie Haan included him in the starting line-up against Bahrain in a friendly game that ended in a 2–2 draw. He was called into the national team throughout 2004 playing in several Fifa world cup qualifiers and AFC Asian Cup squads. Since 2007 he has lost his position within the national team to Mao Jianqing and Du Zhenyu preferred within the subsequent squads.

== Honours ==
=== Club ===
Dalian Shide

- Chinese Jia-A League / Chinese Super League: 2000, 2001, 2002, 2005
- Chinese FA Cup: 2001, 2005

=== Country ===
- AFC Asian Cup: 2004 (Runners-up)
