= 1995 Chinese Football Super Cup =

Shanghai Shenhua	Jinan Taishan
1	0
- Date: 9 December 1995
- Venue: Hongkou Stadium, Shanghai
- Man of the Match: Fan Zhiyi

The 1995 Chinese Football Super Cup (Chinese: 1995年中国足球超霸杯赛) was the first edition of the Chinese Football Super Cup, contested by Chinese Jia-A League 1995 winners Shanghai Shenhua and 1995 Chinese FA Cup winners Jinan Taishan. Fan Zhiyi scored the first goal of the Chinese Football Super Cup, which ensured Shanghai Shenhua win their first Chinese Football Super Cup title.

== Match details ==
9 December 1995

Shanghai Shenhua	1 – 0	Jinan Taishan
Fan Zhiyi 15'

Hongkou Stadium, Shanghai

Chinese Football Super Cup
1995 Winners
Shanghai Shenhua
First title
