= Wang Sheng (footballer) =

Chinese footballer

Wang Sheng 王圣
Personal information
- Date of birth: May 1, 1981 (age 45)
- Place of birth: Qingdao, Shandong, China
- Height: 1.86 m (6 ft 1 in)
- Position: Defender

Senior career*
Years	Team	Apps	(Gls)
1999–2007	Dalian Shide	184	(15)
2008	Wuhan Optics Valley	9	(2)
2009	→ Dalian Shide (loan)	12	(0)
2010–2011	Hubei Luyin	?	(?)
2012	Chongqing FC	19	(3)

International career^{‡}
2007	China	1	(0)
Medal record
Representing China
Men's football
AFC Youth Championship
Bronze medal – third place	2000 َ Iran	Team
- * Club domestic league appearances and goals as of Jan 1, 2012 ‡ National team caps and goals as of Jan 1, 2012

Wang Sheng (Chinese:王圣 born May 1, 1981; Qingdao, Shandong, China) is a Chinese former international footballer who played as a defender.

== Club career ==
Wang Sheng began his career with top tier side Dalian Shide in 1999 where he made eight appearances in his debut season and by the following season he would further increase his appearances with 12 games to establish himself as a regular within the team. During his time with Dalian he spent nine seasons with them seeing them win four league titles and two Chinese FA Cups. He would transfer to Wuhan Optics Valley in the 2008 season which turned out to be a disappointment when Wuhan spent the entire season fighting relegation and even quitting the CSL for unfair punishment after the club's management did not accept the punishment given to them by the Chinese Football Association after a scuffle broke out during a league game against Beijing Guoan on September 27, 2008. Unable to play any football Wang Sheng would rejoin his old club Dalian Shide on loan from Wuhan for the whole of the 2009 league season. In the 2010 league season he returned to Wuhan with the reformed club Hubei Luyin. After being released by the Hubei club, he moved to China League Two club Fushun Xinye for the 2011 season. In 2012 he joined China League One Chongqing F.C.

== International career ==
Despite being a regular for one of the most dominant teams in the Chinese League Wang Sheng would have to wait until February 7, 2007 when he played in a friendly against Kazakhstan in a 2-1 win. This was his only appearance for his country.

== Honours ==
Dalian Shide

- Chinese Jia-A League/ Chinese Super League: 2000, 2001, 2002, 2005
- Chinese FA Cup: 2001, 2005
