= Wang Peng (footballer, born 1978) =

Chinese footballer

Wang Peng 王鹏
Personal information
- Date of birth: June 16, 1978 (age 48)
- Place of birth: Dalian, Liaoning, China
- Height: 1.83 m (6 ft 0 in)
- Position: Striker

Senior career*
Years	Team	Apps	(Gls)
1996–2007	Dalian Wanda	194	(52)
2005	→ Sichuan First City (loan)	24	(8)
2006	→Xi'an Chanba International (loan)	24	(6)
2008–2009	Shaanxi Baorong Chanba	51	(8)

International career^{‡}
1998–2007	China	15	(3)
Medal record
Men's football
Representing China
Asian Games
Bronze medal – third place	1998 Bangkok	Football
East Asian Games
Bronze medal – third place	1997 Busan	Football
AFC Youth Championship
Silver medal – second place	1996 َ South Korea	Team
- * Club domestic league appearances and goals as of 16 October 2012 ‡ National team caps and goals as of 16 October 2012

Wang Peng (Chinese: 王鹏; born June 16, 1978, in Dalian) is a former Chinese international footballer who played as a striker. In his playing career, he represented Dalian Wanda where he won six Chinese league titles with them before having short spells with Sichuan First City and Shaanxi Baorong Chanba.

== Club career ==
=== Dalian Shide ===
Wang Peng started his professional career with Dalian Wanda in the 1996 season making 3 appearances and scoring 1 goal. The following season was to prove extremely successful for Wang Peng as he won the league title with Dalian, playing a significant role by making 22 appearances and scoring 7 goals. During his time with Dalian he won several league titles and one Chinese FA Cup with them while also seeing the team change their name to Dalian Shide in 2000. By the 2004 season Wang Peng saw his playing time significantly reduced with the arrival of Ermin Šiljak and the return of Zoran Janković.

=== Loan moves and Shaanxi Baorong Chanba ===
Wang Peng moved to Sichuan First City for one season where he regained his form by scoring 8 goals in his 23 appearances, however Sichuan First City disbanded the following season and Wang Peng moved to Xi'an Chanba International on loan. After one season with Xi'an Chanba International, Wang Peng moved back to Dalian Shide for one more season before returning to Xi'an Chanba International, which had later changed its name to Shaanxi Baorong Chanba, on a permanent basis for 2 million yuan.

== International career ==
Wang Peng would make his debut for the senior team on November 22, 1998, in a friendly against South Korea in a 0–0 draw. His performance was considered good enough for him to be included in 1998 Asian Games where Wang Peng would score his first goal against Lebanon and help China come third and in the tournament. He would unfortunately lose favour with new head coach Bora Milutinović and miss the 2002 FIFA World Cup, however while he would regain his position within the Chinese squad when Arie Haan became the next head coach Wang Peng could not take part in the 2004 AFC Asian Cup when he sustained an injury before the tournament. On his return to the national team he found it difficult to gain consistent playing time yet was still included in the 2007 AFC Asian Cup squad but did not play in any of their games in a disappointing tournament.

== International goals ==
No.	Date	Venue	Opponent	Score	Result	Competition
1.	30 November 1998	Surat Thani Stadium, Surat Thani, Thailand	Lebanon	4–1	4–1	1998 Asian Games
2.	2 December 1998	Surat Thani Stadium, Surat Thani, Thailand	Cambodia	2–0	4–1	1998 Asian Games
3.	19 December 1998	Tinsulanon Stadium, Songkhla, Thailand	Thailand	2–0	2–0	1998 Asian Games

== Honours ==
Dalian Wanda

- Chinese Jia-A League/Chinese Super League: 1996, 1997, 1998, 2000, 2001, 2002
- Chinese FA Cup: 2001
