= Fabrice Grange =

French footballer (born 1971)

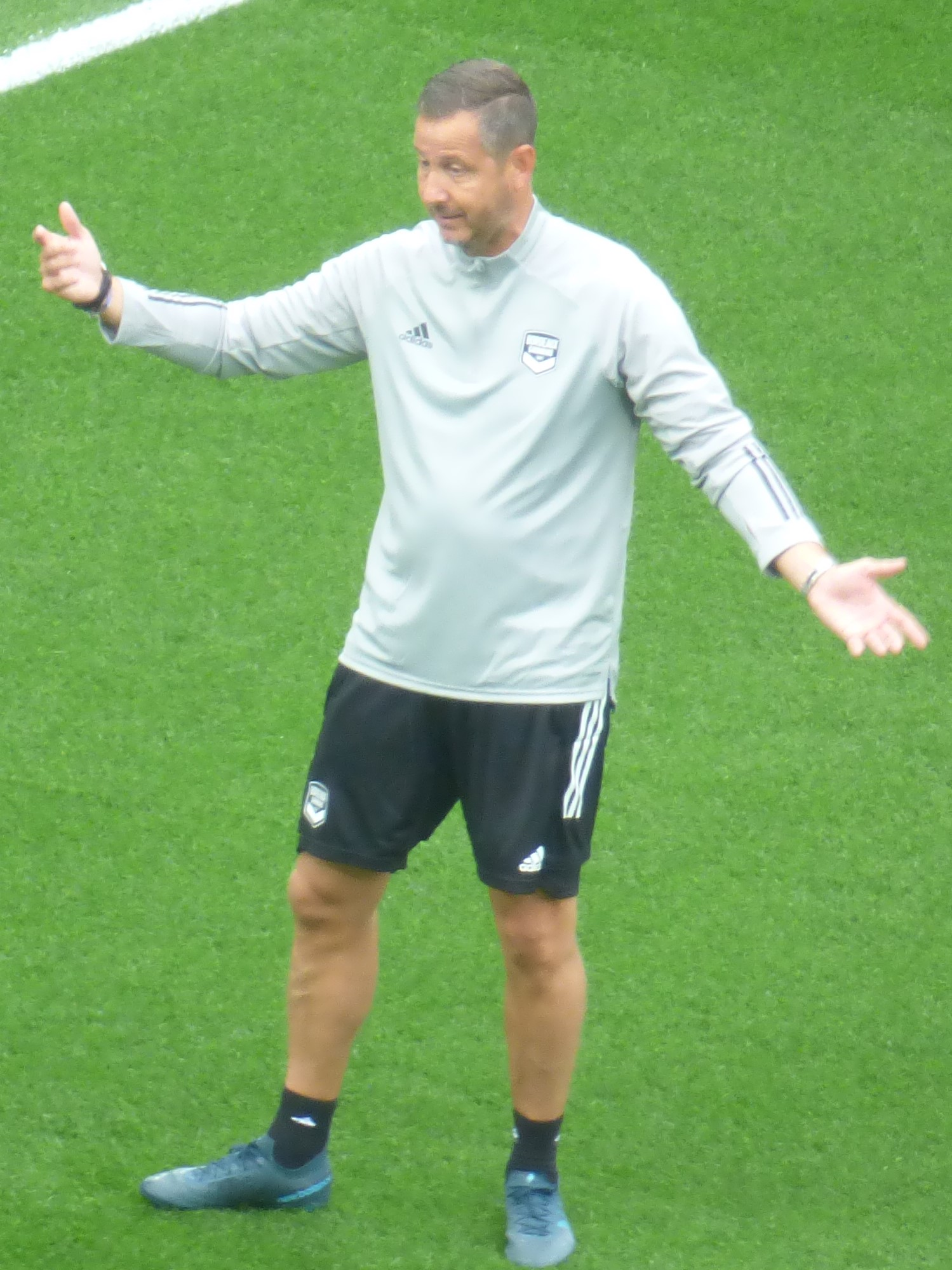
- Grange in 2020

Personal information
- Date of birth: 3 December 1971 (age 53)
- Place of birth: Sainte-Foy-lès-Lyon, France
- Position(s): Goalkeeper

Senior career*
Years	Team	Apps	(Gls)
–1994	Lyon	0	(0)
1994–1997	Charleville		
1997–1998	Nantes	1	(0)
- Liaoning
2002	RC Paris		
2002–2004	Beauvais	26+	(0+)
- * Club domestic league appearances and goals

Fabrice Grange (born 3 December 1971) is a French former professional footballer who played as a goalkeeper. He is the currently goalkeeper coach of Saudi Pro League club Neom.
