= Xiao Zhanbo =

Chinese footballer

Xiao Zhanbo 肖战波
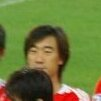
- Xiao in 2008

Personal information
- Date of birth: 22 July 1975 (age 51)
- Place of birth: Shenyang, Liaoning, China
- Height: 1.80 m (5 ft 11 in)
- Position: Midfielder

Team information
- Current team: Shijiazhuang Gongfu (assistant coach)

Youth career
- 1985–1995: Liaoning FC

Senior career*
Years	Team	Apps	(Gls)
1996–2000	Liaoning FC	44	(2)
2001–2003	Qingdao Jonoon	72	(8)
2004–2008	Shanghai Shenhua	70	(6)
2010	Chengdu Blades	10	(0)

International career^{‡}
2003–2008	China	27	(3)

Managerial career
- 2017: Shenyang Urban
- 2021–2022: UMB Hasar
- 2023: Wuxi Wugou (assistant)
- 2024: Liaoning Tieren (assistant)
- 2025–: Shijiazhuang Gongfu (assistant)
Medal record
Representing China
Men's football
East Asian Football Championship
Bronze medal – third place	2003 Japan	Team
AFC U-16 Championship
Gold medal – first place	1992 Saudi Arabia	Team
- * Club domestic league appearances and goals as of 13 February 2012 ‡ National team caps and goals as of 14 April 2009

Xiao Zhanbo (Chinese: 肖战波) (born 22 July 1975) is a Chinese former footballer who played as a midfielder.

== Club career ==
Xiao was born in Liaoning, China. He started his career with second-tier club Liaoning in the 1996 Chinese league season as a defensive midfielder and was part of the squad that helped guide Liaoning to gain promotion at the end of the 1998 league campaign. After cementing his position within the Liaoning team he could not agree upon a long-term contract with the club and was transferred to top-tier club Qingdao where he stayed for three seasons and won the 2002 Chinese FA Cup with them.

Xiao Zhanbo would later move to then current title holders Shanghai Shenhua at the beginning of the 2004 league season where he found it difficult to quickly establish himself in his debut season only achieving 5 league games. The following season was to prove considerably more successful when Xiao would become an integral part of Shanghai's failed title bid that saw them come second in the league. His establishment in the Shanghai's team was to continue for several more seasons until the merger of Shanghai Shenhua with Shanghai United F.C. at the beginning of the 2007 league season, which saw an influx of players towards the team leaving Xiao Zhanbo dropped from the team and even forcing him to take a pay cut due to the salary cap. Xiao Zhanbo, however was able to regain his position at Shanghai Shenhua and with a trimmed down squad and Xiao once again an integral part of team he would try and aid Shanghai Shenhua in another title bid, however despite taking Shandong Luneng to the final game Shanghai could only come runners up.

At the end of the 2008 league season his contract with Shanghai expired and he was allowed to leave, this would see Xiao Zhanbo go around Asia to advertise his services and would gain a one-year contract with second tier Chinese club Chengdu Blades. With them he would play in 10 league games as he saw them win promotion to the top tier at the end of the 2010 league season. When his contract ended with Chengdu the club did not decide to issue him with a new one and Xiao Zhanbo would once again go on several trails before joining second-tier club Shenyang Dongjin F.C. as a coach at the beginning of the 2012 league season.

== International career ==
Xiao Zhanbo has been picked in several Chinese squads without ever being selected for any major tournaments. Since making his debut in 2003 he has predominately played in friendlies and has found Zhao Junzhe and Zhou Haibin as the preferred options in his position.

== Honours ==
Qingdao Jonoon

- Chinese FA Cup: 2002
