= Abdeljalil El Hajji =

Moroccan footballer

Personal information
- Full name: Abdeljalil El Hajji
- Date of birth: 28 June 1969 (age 57)
- Place of birth: Rabat, Morocco
- Height: 1.90 m (6 ft 3 in)
- Position: Midfielder

Senior career*
Years	Team	Apps	(Gls)
1985–1987	Youssoufia Rabat		
1987–1992	FUS Rabat		
1992–1993	TAS Casablanca		
1993–1996	Crédit Agricole		
1996–1997	Al-Riyadh		
1998	Liaoning		
1999	Sichuan Guancheng		
2000–2001	Shenzhen Pingan		
2002–2003	Chongqing Longxin		
- * Club domestic league appearances and goals

Abdeljalil El Hajji (Arabic: عبد الجليل ش حجي; born 28 June 1969) is a Moroccan retired footballer who played as a midfielder for Morocco. He was born in Rabat.
