= Adilson (footballer, born 1976) =

Brazilian footballer

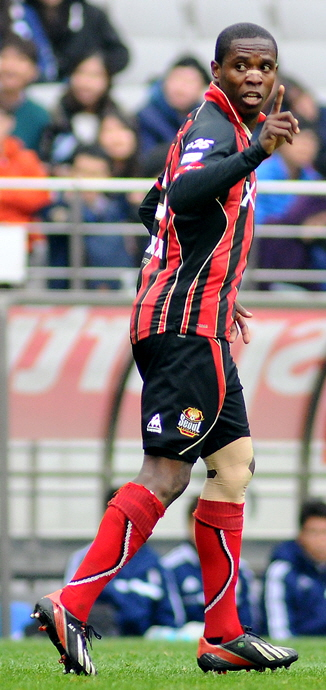

Personal information
- Full name: Adilson dos Santos
- Date of birth: 12 May 1976 (age 50)
- Place of birth: Aracaju, Sergipe, Brazil
- Height: 1.82 m (6 ft 0 in)
- Positions: Left wing-back; center-back; defensive midfielder

Team information
- Current team: FC Seoul (assistant)

Youth career
- –1997: Apucarana

Senior career*
Years	Team	Apps	(Gls)
1997–1998	Paraná Clube		
1998–1999	Red Star Belgrade	12	(0)
2000	Real Betis	0	(0)
2000	Sevilla	0	(0)
2000	→ Dalian Shide (loan)	25	(4)
2001–2005	Dalian Shide	119	(4)
2006–2013	FC Seoul	226	(15)
Total		382	(23)

Managerial career
- 2014–: FC Seoul (assistant)
- * Club domestic league appearances and goals

Adilson dos Santos, shortly Adi or Adilson (born 12 May 1976) is a Brazilian former professional footballer who played as a left-back. After retiring, he stayed as assistant manager at FC Seoul.

== Career ==
Adilson started his senior career playing with Apucarana Atlético Clube, and by 1998 he was estimated the best defender in Paraná State championship.

Next year, he moved to Serbian Red Star Belgrade where he played 11 matches in the First League of FR Yugoslavia during the 1998–99 season.

In 1999, he moved to Real Betis. but he did not make debut and moved to Sevilla. However, Sevilla did not have enough money to pay the transfer fee, so Real Betis lodged a complaint against Sevilla and he was not allowed to play for Sevilla FC. After the issue of the fee was resolved, he still did not play because he was deemed too young a player and the club was in the danger of relegation. He ended up playing on their B team.

In 2001, Adilson moved to Chinese club Dalian Shide. He had succeeded in this club. He became the champion of Asia once and China four times also twice of Chinese FA Cup.

In March 2006, he moved to FC Seoul of K League Classic of South Korea

He was winner of K-League Best XI in 2007, 2008 and 2010. He is now considered the best defender of the K-League after a collection of outstanding performances.

On 29 January 2014, Adilson retired at FC Seoul and was appointed as coach.

== Career statistics ==
Statistics accurate as of 3 December 2013

Appearances and goals by club, season and competition
Club	Season	League			National cup (Note: Includes Korean FA Cup.)		League cup (Note: Includes Korean League Cup.)		Continental		Total	
Club	Season	Division	Apps	Goals	Apps	Goals	Apps	Goals	Apps	Goals	Apps	Goals
FC Seoul	2006	K League	25	1	0	0	9	0			34	1
FC Seoul	2007	K League	24	1	3	0	12	1			39	2
FC Seoul	2008	K League	28	3	1	0	6	0			35	3
FC Seoul	2009	K League	24	2	1	0	4	1	9	0	38	3
FC Seoul	2010	K League	24	4	2	0	7	1			33	5
FC Seoul	2011	K League	30	0	3	1	0	0	9	0	41	1
FC Seoul	2012	K League	38	1	1	0	–				39	1
FC Seoul	2013	K League Classic	33	3	1	0	–		11	1	45	4
FC Seoul	Total		226	15	12	1	38	3	29	1	305	20

== Honours ==
Paraná Clube

- Campeonato Paranaense : 1997

Red Star Belgrade

- FR Yugoslav Cup : 1998–99

Dalian Shide

- Chinese Jia-A League: 2000, 2001, 2002
- Chinese Super League : 2005
- Chinese FA Cup: 2001, 2005
- Chinese Football Super Cup: 2000, 2002
- Asian Cup Winners' Cup runner-up: 2000–01

FC Seoul

- K League: 2010, 2012; runner-up 2008
- Korean League Cup: 2006, 2010; runner-up 2007
- AFC Champions League runner-up: 2013

Individual

- K League Best XI: 2007, 2008, 2010, 2012, 2013
