= Milorad Kosanović =

Serbian football player and manager (1951–2026)

Personal information
- Date of birth: 4 January 1951
- Place of birth: Šidski Banovci, PR Croatia, FPR Yugoslavia
- Date of death: 4 January 2026 (aged 75)
- Place of death: Novi Sad, Vojvodina, Serbia
- Position: Defender

Senior career*
Years	Team	Apps	(Gls)
1970–1972	Borovo		
1974–1975	Proleter Zrenjanin	29	(1)
1976–1977	Vojvodina	21	(0)
1978–1979	Kikinda	10	(0)
1979	Vojvodina	3	(0)
1980–1984	Novi Sad	48	(1)
Total		111	(2)

Managerial career
- 1992–1995: Vojvodina
- 1995: Borac Čačak
- 1996–1997: Malta
- 1997–1998: Red Star Belgrade
- 1999: Wuhan Hongtao
- 2000–2004: Dalian Shide
- 2004–2005: FR Yugoslavia U21
- 2007: Red Star Belgrade
- 2008: Dalian Shide
- 2010–2011: Shaanxi Zhongjian Chanba
- 2013–2014: Olimpija Ljubljana
- 2014–2015: Novi Pazar
- 2015: Borac Čačak
- 2016: Borac Čačak
- 2016: Radnik Surdulica
- 2017: Borac Čačak
- 2017–2019: Napredak Kruševac
- 2019–2020: Radnički Niš
- 2023: Mladost Lučani
- * Club domestic league appearances and goals

Milorad Kosanović (Serbian Cyrillic: Милорад Косановић, pronounced [mîlorad kosǎːnoʋitɕ]; 4 January 1951 – 4 January 2026) was a Serbian football player and manager.

During his playing career, Kosanović represented Proleter Zrenjanin, Vojvodina, Kikinda and Novi Sad, competing in the Yugoslav First and Second League.

As manager, Kosanović worked for numerous clubs at home and abroad. He died in Novi Sad on 4 January 2026, at the age of 75.

== Managerial statistics ==
Managerial record by team and tenure
Team	From	To	Record				
Team	From	To	P	W	D	L	Win %
Vojvodina	July 1992	May 1995	111	59	26	26	53.15
Malta	January 1996	June 1997	15	0	2	13	0.00
Red Star Belgrade	June 1997	December 1998	74	54	9	11	72.97
Wuhan Optics	July 1999	November 1999	14	9	3	2	64.29
Dalian Shide	December 1999	May 2004	161	95	37	29	59.01
Serbia and Montenegro U21	September 2004	February 2005	4	3	0	1	75.00
Red Star Belgrade	August 2007	November 2007	17	7	7	3	41.18
Dalian Shide	June 2008	December 2008	23	4	10	9	17.39
Shaanxi Zhongjian Chanba	May 2010	July 2011	33	14	11	8	42.42
Olimpija Ljubljana	October 2013	April 2014	21	6	6	9	28.57
Novi Pazar	September 2014	June 2015	25	11	7	7	44.00
Borac Čačak	November 2015	January 2016	6	3	0	3	50.00
Borac Čačak	April 2016	June 2016	5	2	1	2	40.00
Surdulica	November 2016	January 2017	5	1	2	2	20.00
Borac Čačak	April 2017	June 2017	6	3	1	2	50.00
Napredak	September 2017	June 2019	70	28	18	24	40.00
Radnički Niš	August 2019	February 2020	19	10	2	7	52.63
Total			626	314	146	166	50.16

== Honours ==
Dalian Shide

- Chinese Jia-A League: 2000, 2001, 2002
- Chinese FA Cup: 2001
- Chinese FA Super Cup: 2000, 2002
