= Marcelo Sergipano =

Brazilian footballer

Personal information
- Full name: Job Marcelo de Jesus
- Date of birth: 1 April 1972 (age 54)
- Place of birth: Lagarto, Brazil
- Position: Forward

Senior career*
Years	Team	Apps	(Gls)
1991	Propriá		
1992	Tanabi		
1993	Itabuna		
1994–1995	Sergipe		
1995–1996	Rio Branco-SP		
1997	América-SP		
1997	Ponte Preta		
1997–1998	São Paulo	9	(1)
1999–2000	Shanghai Shenhua		
2001	Ponte Preta		
2002	Confiança		
2002	Vila Nova		
2003	União Rondonópolis		
2003	Francana		
2005	Boca Júnior		
2005	Itaperuna		
2006	Sergipe		
2007	Boca Júnior		

Managerial career
- 2007: São Cristóvão-SE
- 2008: Boca Júnior
- 2009: Itabaiana
- 2023: América de Pedrinhas
- * Club domestic league appearances and goals

Job Marcelo de Jesus (born 1 April 1972), better known as Marcelo Sergipano, is a Brazilian former professional footballer and manager who played as a forward.

== Career ==
Marcelo Sergipano spent time at several clubs in Brazil, notably CS Sergipe and São Paulo FC.

After retiring, he was football director of Botafogo de Cristinápolis and manager of América de Pedrinhas.

== Honours ==
Sergipe

- Campeonato Sergipano: 1994, 1995

São Paulo

- Campeonato Paulista: 1998

Boca Júnior

- Campeonato Sergipano Série A2: 2007

Individual

- 1994 Campeonato Sergipano top scorer: 25 goals
