= Lu Jun (referee) =

Chinese football referee

- Full name: Lu Jun
- Born: March 19, 1959 (age 67); China

Domestic
Years	League	Role
1990s–2002	Chinese Super League	Referee

International
Years	League	Role
1990s–2002	FIFA listed	Referee

Lu Jun (Chinese: 陆俊; pinyin: Lù Jùn; Mandarin pronunciation: [lû tɕŷn]; born March 19, 1959) is an association football referee from China. He supervised two matches in the 2002 FIFA World Cup in South Korea and Japan, one between Croatia and Mexico in Niigata, and another between Poland and the United States in Daejeon. He also officiated the 1991 FIFA Women's World Cup in China, the 2001 FIFA Confederations Cup in Japan and South Korea and the 2000 Olympics.

In 2010, Lu was arrested along with two other referees for accepting bribes and match fixing. He was sentenced to five and a half years in jail in February 2012 after admitting taking bribes worth more than $128,000 (£82,000) to fix the results of seven league games.
