= 2000 Chinese Jia-A League =

Chinese Jia-A League
- Season: 2000
- Champions: Dalian Shide (5th title)
- Relegated: Xiamen Xiaxin; Jilin Aodong
- Asian Club Championship: Dalian Shide
- Matches: 182
- Goals: 445 (2.45 per match)
- Top goalscorer: Casiano Delvalle (15 goals)
- Average attendance: 19,901

The 2000 Chinese Jia-A League season, also known as Pepsi Chinese Jia-A League for sponsorship reasons, was the seventh season of professional association football and the 39th top-tier overall league season in China. The league started on March 19 and ended on October 1, and saw Dalian Shide win the championship.

== Promotion and relegation ==
Teams promoted from 1999 Jia-B League

- Xiamen Xiaxin
- Yunnan Hongta

Relegated after end of 1999 Jia-A League

- Guangzhou Songri
- Wuhan Hongtao K

== Personnel ==
Team	Manager
Beijing Guoan	(China) Wei Kexing
Chongqing Longxin	(South Korea) Lee Jang-soo
Dalian Shide	(Federal Republic of Yugoslavia) Milorad Kosanović
Jilin Aodong	(China) Gao Hui
Liaoning Fushun	(China) Wang Hongli
Qingdao Yizhong Hainiu	(Federal Republic of Yugoslavia) Miloljub Ostojić
Shandong Luneng	(Federal Republic of Yugoslavia) Slobodan Santrač
Shanghai Shenhua	(Federal Republic of Yugoslavia) Ljupko Petrović
Shenyang Haishi	(Poland) Henryk Kasperczak
Shenzhen Pingan	(China) Zhu Guanghu
Sichuan Guancheng	(Croatia) Miloš Hrstić
Tianjin TEDA	(Uruguay) Nelson Agresta
Xiamen Xiaxin	(China) Chi Shangbin
Yunnan Hongta	(China) Qi Wusheng

== Foreign players ==
Club	Player 1	Player 2	Player 3	Former players
Beijing Guoan	(Brazil) Sandro Sotilli	(El Salvador) Alexander Amaya	(Federal Republic of Yugoslavia) Nikoslav Bjegović	(Portugal) Rui Esteves
Chongqing Longxin	(Bulgaria) Milen Georgiev	(Croatia) Miroslav Bičanić	(South Africa) Mark Williams	
Dalian Shide	(Brazil) Adilson	(Brazil) Nando	(Federal Republic of Yugoslavia) Miodrag Pantelić	(Federal Republic of Yugoslavia) Dalibor Škorić
Jilin Aodong	(Croatia) Mate Šestan	(Democratic Republic of the Congo) Zola Kiniambi	(Hungary) András Telek	(Cameroon) Bruno Hameni Njeukam
Liaoning Fushun	(France) Fabrice Grange	(Senegal) Momart Gueye	(Ukraine) Viktor Moroz	(Czech Republic) Rostislav Hertl (Hungary) Zoltán Jagodics
Qingdao Yizhong Hainiu	(Federal Republic of Yugoslavia) Aleksandar Stevanović	(Federal Republic of Yugoslavia) Predrag Brzaković	(Uruguay) Adrián Paz	(Federal Republic of Yugoslavia) Milan Samurović
Shandong Luneng	(Federal Republic of Yugoslavia) Saša Petrović	(Ghana) Charles Wittl	(Paraguay) Casiano Delvalle	(Federal Republic of Yugoslavia) Denis Prtenjača
Shanghai Shenhua	(Federal Republic of Yugoslavia) Dejan Sarić	(Federal Republic of Yugoslavia) Saša Viciknez	(Federal Republic of Yugoslavia) Zoran Ranković	(Brazil) Marcelo Sergipano
Shenyang Haishi	(Cameroon) Tobie Mimboe	(Peru) Miguel Miranda	(Ukraine) Serhiy Nahornyak	(Zimbabwe) Wilfred Mugeyi
Shenzhen Pingan	(Brazil) Tiago	(Morocco) Abdeljalil El Hajji		(England) Paul Rideout
Sichuan Guancheng	(Brazil) Lula	(Brazil) Milson	(Croatia) Kazimir Vulić	
Tianjin TEDA	(Brazil) Emerson	(Uruguay) Gustavo Matosas	(Uruguay) Juan Ferreri	(Chile) Eugenio Guajardo
Xiamen Xiaxin	(Brazil) Evaldo Goncalves	(Brazil) Rodrigo Carbone	(Sierra Leone) Mahmadu Alphajor Bah	(Bosnia and Herzegovina) Amir Osmanović (Croatia) Mate Šestan
Yunnan Hongta	(Cameroon) Bertin Tomou	(Guinea) Fodé Camara	(Romania) Aristică Cioabă	(Zambia) Rotson Kilambe

== League standings ==
Pos	Team	Pld	W	D	L	GF	GA	GD	Pts	Qualification or relegation
1	Dalian Shide	26	17	5	4	50	21	+29	56	2001–02 Asian Club Championship qualification
2	Shanghai Shenhua	26	14	8	4	37	24	+13	50	
3	Sichuan Guancheng	26	12	8	6	33	21	+12	44	
4	Chongqing Longxin	26	10	11	5	46	33	+13	41	
5	Shandong Luneng	26	12	4	10	35	31	+4	40	
6	Beijing Guoan	26	9	8	9	38	32	+6	35	
7	Shenyang Haishi	26	8	10	8	35	32	+3	34	
8	Liaoning Fushun	26	8	8	10	28	26	+2	32	
9	Shenzhen Pingan	26	8	8	10	27	27	0	32	
10	Tianjin TEDA	26	7	10	9	28	37	−9	31	
11	Qingdao Yizhong Hainiu	26	6	11	9	22	29	−7	29	
12	Yunnan Hongta	26	8	5	13	24	42	−18	29	
13	Xiamen Xiaxin	26	6	5	15	22	45	−23	23	Relegated to Jia-B League
14	Jilin Aodong	26	4	5	17	20	45	−25	17	Relegated to Jia-B League

Source: rsssf.com

== Top scorers ==
Rank	Scorer	Club	Goals
1	(Paraguay) Casiano Delvalle	Shandong Luneng	15
2	(China) Wang Tao	Beijing Guoan	13
2	(Federal Republic of Yugoslavia) Zoran Ranković	Shanghai Shenhua	13
2	(South Africa) Mark Williams	Chongqing Longxin	13
5	(Croatia) Miroslav Bičanić	Chongqing Longxin	12
5	(Ukraine) Serhiy Nahornyak	Shenyang Haishi	12
7	(China) Zhang Yuning	Liaoning Fushun	11
8	(Federal Republic of Yugoslavia) Dejan Sarić	Shanghai Shenhua	10
8	(Federal Republic of Yugoslavia) Miodrag Pantelić	Dalian Shide	10
10	(China) Li Bing	Sichuan Guancheng	9
10	(Guinea) Fodé Camara	Yunnan Hongta	9

== See also ==
- Chinese Jia-A League
- Chinese Super League
- Chinese Football Association Jia League
- Chinese Football Association Yi League
- Chinese FA Cup
- Chinese Football Association
- Football in China
- List of football records in China
- Chinese clubs in the AFC Champions League
