= 2002 Chinese Jia-A League =

Chinese Jia-A League
- Season: 2002
- Champions: Dalian Shide (7th title)
- Relegated: No relegation
- AFC Champions League: Dalian Shide (postponed until 2004)
- A3 Champions Cup: Dalian Shide
- Matches: 210
- Goals: 548 (2.61 per match)
- Top goalscorer: Tiago; Li Jinyu (16 goals each)
- Average attendance: 14,984

The 2002 Chinese Jia-A League season was the ninth season of professional association football and the 41st top-tier overall league season in China. The league started on March 9 and ended on November 30, with Dalian Shide winning the championship. In order to help the Chinese national team prepare for the 2002 FIFA World Cup, there was no relegation within the league for this season.

== Promotion and relegation ==
Teams promoted from 2001 Jia-B League

- Shanghai Zhongyuan Huili

Teams relegated to 2002 Jia-B League

- None

== Overview ==
Before the league started it was dogged by rumours of match fixing when it was discovered that second tier club and promotion hopeful Changchun Yatai had fixed a match on October 6, 2001 against Zhejiang in their favour. When these allegations turned out to be true, Changchun Yatai were denied promotion into the league as their punishment, which meant there would only be 15 teams performing within the league. Also before the season started it was decided that because the Chinese national team had qualified for the 2002 FIFA World Cup, there would be no relegation so the players would not be distracted with the fear of demotion. Within the season Dalian Shide would continue their dominance within Chinese football and win their third consecutive league championship.

== Personnel ==
Team	Manager
August 1st	
Beijing Guoan	(Serbia and Montenegro) Ljupko Petrović
Chongqing Lifan	(Brazil) Edson Tavares
Dalian Shide	(Federal Republic of Yugoslavia) Milorad Kosanović
Liaoning Bird	(China) Wang Hongli
Qingdao Hademen	(South Korea) Lee Jang-soo
Shaanxi Guoli	
Shandong Luneng	(Russia) Valery Nepomnyashchy
Shanghai Shenhua	(China) Wu Jingui
Shanghai Zhongyuan Huili	(France) Claude Le Roy
Shenyang Ginde	(Portugal) Toni
Shenzhen Ping'an Insurance	(China) Zhu Guanghu
Sichuan Dahe	
Tianjin TEDA	(Uruguay) Nelson Agresta
Yunnan Hongta	(China) Qi Wusheng

== Foreign players ==
As a military-owned team, August 1st were not allowed to sign any foreign players.

Club	Player 1	Player 2	Player 3	Player 4	Former players
Beijing Guoan	(Brazil) Henrique	(Bulgaria) Predrag Pažin	(Federal Republic of Yugoslavia) Uroš Predić	(Paraguay) Casiano Delvalle	(Austria) Roland Kirchler (Federal Republic of Yugoslavia) Zoran Ranković
Chongqing Lifan	(Democratic Republic of the Congo) Zola Kiniambi	(France) Christophe Cocard	(Morocco) Abdeljalil El Hajji	(Zimbabwe) Agent Sawu	(Croatia) Dean Računica
Dalian Shide	(Brazil) Adilson	(Bulgaria) Zoran Janković	(Federal Republic of Yugoslavia) Srđan Bajčetić	(France) Nicolas Ouédec	
Liaoning Bird	(Netherlands) Dave Kastelein				(Cameroon) Clément Lebe
Qingdao Hademen	(Brazil) Lula	(Croatia) Dragan Vukoja	(Croatia) Miroslav Bičanić	(South Africa) Mark Williams	
Shaanxi Guoli	(Brazil) Sandro Sotilli				
Shandong Luneng	(Argentina) Alfredo Moreno	(Belarus) Erik Yakhimovich	(Ghana) Nii Lamptey	(Ukraine) Serhiy Nahornyak	
Shanghai Shenhua	(Bosnia and Herzegovina) Saša Raca	(Brazil) Júnior Baiano	(Honduras) Saúl Martínez	(Uruguay) Rubén Sosa	(Brazil) Auricélio Neres (Norway) Tom Kåre Staurvik
Shanghai Zhongyuan Huili	(Brazil) Zé Alcino	(France) Cédric Lécluse	(Italy) Daniel Puce	(Senegal) Abdoulaye M'Baye	
Shenyang Ginde	(Brazil) Eliseu	(Cameroon) Alphonse Tchami	(Nigeria) Benedict Akwuegbu		
Shenzhen Ping'an Insurance	(Brazil) Tiago				(France) David Mazzoncini
Sichuan Dahe	(Brazil) Marcelo Marmelo	(Federal Republic of Yugoslavia) Goran Milovanović	(Federal Republic of Yugoslavia) Ljubiša Ranković		(Federal Republic of Yugoslavia) Gordan Petrić
Tianjin TEDA	(Brazil) Jorjão	(Uruguay) Diego Meijide			
Yunnan Hongta	(Romania) Victor Naicu	(Russia) Sergei Kiriakov			(Romania) Viorel Domocoş

== League standings ==
Pos	Team	Pld	W	D	L	GF	GA	GD	Pts
1	Dalian Shide	28	17	6	5	48	27	+21	57
2	Shenzhen Ping'an Insurance	28	14	10	4	42	21	+21	52
3	Beijing Guoan	28	15	7	6	49	29	+20	52
4	Shandong Luneng	28	14	3	11	42	42	0	45
5	Liaoning Bird	28	12	6	10	45	44	+1	42
6	Chongqing Lifan	28	10	11	7	28	25	+3	41
7	Yunnan Hongta	28	10	10	8	30	28	+2	40
8	Qingdao Hademen	28	9	9	10	30	34	−4	36
9	Shanghai Zhongyuan Huili	28	9	8	11	37	39	−2	35
10	Tianjin TEDA	28	9	7	12	37	36	+1	34
11	Shenyang Ginde	28	8	10	10	34	34	0	34
12	Shanghai Shenhua	28	9	5	14	37	41	−4	32
13	August 1st	28	6	12	10	27	41	−14	30
14	Sichuan Dahe	28	7	7	14	39	55	−16	28
15	Shaanxi Guoli	28	2	7	19	24	53	−29	13

Source: rsssf.com

== Top scorers ==
Rank	Scorer	Club	Goals
1	(Brazil) Tiago	Shenzhen Ping'an Insurance	16
1	(China) Li Jinyu	Liaoning Bird	16
3	(China) Li Bing	Sichuan Dahe	11
3	(China) Qu Shengqing	Shanghai Shenhua	11
3	(China) Yu Genwei	Tianjin TEDA	11
3	(Paraguay) Casiano Delvalle	Beijing Guoan	11
7	(Brazil) Zé Alcino	Shanghai Zhongyuan Huili	10
7	(China) Li Yi	Shenzhen Ping'an Insurance	10
7	(China) Wang Xinxin	Liaoning Bird	10
7	(France) Nicolas Ouédec	Dalian Shide	10

== See also ==
- Chinese Jia-A League
- Chinese Super League
- Chinese Football Association Jia League
- Chinese Football Association Yi League
- Chinese FA Cup
- Chinese Football Association
- Football in China
- List of football records in China
- Chinese clubs in the AFC Champions League
