= Chinese FA Super Cup =

- Founded: 1995; 31 years ago
- Region: China
- Teams: 2
- Current champions: Beijing Guoan (3rd title)
- Most championships: Shanghai Shenhua (5 titles)
- 2026 Chinese FA Super Cup

The Chinese FA Super Cup (Chinese: 中国足协超级杯; pinyin: Zhōngguó Zúxié Chāojíbēi), formerly named Chinese Football Super Cup (Chinese: 中国足球超霸杯; pinyin: Zhōngguó Zúqíu Chāobàbēi), is a Chinese football super cup competition that takes place every year before the start of the new season. It is contested between the champions of the previous Chinese Super League season and the holders of the Chinese FA Cup. If the Super League champions also won the FA Cup, then the league runners-up provide the opposition. Established in 1995, it was not held between 2004 and 2011.

The most successful club is Shanghai Shenhua with five titles.

== Winners ==
The winner is typed in bold.

Season	Date	Jia-A/CSL winner	Result	FA Cup winner	Ref.
1995	9 December 1995	**Shanghai Shenhua**	**1–0**	Jinan Taishan	
1996	9 March 1997	**Dalian Wanda**	**3–2**	Beijing Guoan	
1997	12 March 1998	Dalian Wanda	**1–2** a.e.t. (g.g.)	**Beijing Guoan**	
1998	7 March 1999	Dalian Wanda Shide	**0–3**	**Shanghai Shenhua**	
1999	4 March 2000	Shandong Luneng Taishan	**2–4**	**Liaoning F.C.** (Note: Entered as league runners-up)	
2000	30 December 2000	**Dalian Shide**	**4–1**	Chongqing Lifan	
2001	26 February 2002	Dalian Shide	**1–3** (Note: Aggregate score (two-legged tie)) (1–1 / 0–2)	**Shanghai Shenhua**	
2001	2 March 2002	Dalian Shide	**1–3** (1–1 / 0–2)	**Shanghai Shenhua**	
2002	6 February 2003	**Dalian Shide**	**1–0**	Qingdao Etsong Hainiu	
2003	18 January 2004	Shanghai Shenhua	**3–4**	**Beijing Guoan**	
2012	25 February 2012	**Guangzhou Evergrande**	**2–1**	Tianjin Teda	
2013	3 March 2013	Guangzhou Evergrande	**1–2**	**Jiangsu Sainty**	
2014	16 February 2014	Guangzhou Evergrande	**0–1**	**Guizhou Renhe**	
2015	14 February 2015	Guangzhou Evergrande Taobao	**0–0** (3–5 pen.)	**Shandong Luneng Taishan**	
2016	27 February 2016	**Guangzhou Evergrande Taobao**	**2–0**	Jiangsu Suning	
2017	25 February 2017	**Guangzhou Evergrande Taobao**	**1–0**	Jiangsu Suning	
2018	26 February 2018	**Guangzhou Evergrande Taobao**	**4–1**	Shanghai Greenland Shenhua	
2019	23 February 2019	**Shanghai SIPG**	**2–0**	Beijing Sinobo Guoan	
The 2020, 2021 and 2022 editions were cancelled due to the COVID-19 pandemic in China.
2023	8 April 2023	**Wuhan Three Towns**	**2–0**	Shandong Taishan	
2024	25 February 2024	Shanghai Port	**0–1**	**Shanghai Shenhua**	
2025	7 February 2025	Shanghai Port	**2–3**	**Shanghai Shenhua**	
2026	1 March 2026	Shanghai Port	**0–2**	**Beijing Guoan**	

== Titles by team ==
Performances in Chinese FA Super Cup by club
Club	Title(s)	Runners-up	Years won	Years runner-up
Shanghai Shenhua	5	2	1995, 1998, 2001, 2024, 2025	2003, 2018
Guangzhou	4	3	2012, 2016, 2017, 2018	2013, 2014, 2015
Dalian Shide	3	3	1996, 2000, 2002	1997, 1998, 2001
Beijing Guoan	3	2	1997, 2003, 2026	1996, 2019
Shandong Taishan	1	3	2015	1995, 1999, 2023
Shanghai Port	1	3	2019	2024, 2025, 2026
Jiangsu	1	2	2013	2016, 2017
Liaoning F.C.	1	0	1999	—
Guizhou Renhe	1	0	2014	—
Wuhan Three Towns	1	0	2023	—
Chongqing Liangjiang Athletic	0	1	—	2000
Qingdao Hainiu	0	1	—	2002
Tianjin Jinmen Tiger	0	1	—	2012
