= Football records and statistics in China =

These are the Records for the Chinese Football League since its inception in 1994.

== Scorers ==
=== All-time top scorers ===
The following is a cumulative record of all-time goals scored by single players in the Chinese Top Level Professional League, since its inception in 1994 as the Chinese Jia-A League. Players with at least 50 goals are listed.

All-time top scorers in the Chinese Top Level Professional League since 1994 (League goals only)
Rank	Player	Goals	Appearances	Clubs (only in Jia-A & CSL, the clubs are listed with current name)
1	(China) **Wu Lei**	166	250	2013–2018 Shanghai SIPG; 2022–present Shanghai Port
2	(China) Ai Kesen	133	225	2013–2015 Guangzhou F.C.; 2016–2019 Shanghai SIPG; 2019–2021Guangzhou F.C.; 2023–2024 Chengdu Rongcheng.
3	(China) Li Jinyu	120	251	1999–2003 Liaoning FC; 2004–2010 Shandong Luneng
4	(China) Gao Lin	100	365	2008–2009 Shanghai Shenhua; 2011–2022 Guangzhou F.C.
5	(China) Hao Haidong	96	185	1994–1996 1 August; 1997–2004 Dalian Shide
6	(China) Han Peng	91	246	2002–2016 Shandong Luneng
7	(Israel) Eran Zahavi	85	94	2016–2020 Guangzhou R&F
8	(China) Wang Tao	83	180	1994–1999 Dalian Shide; 2000–2002 Beijing Guoan
9	(China) Qu Bo	78	307	2000–2009 Qingdao Jonoon; 2010–2014 Shaanxi Zhongjian
10	(China) Yu Genwei	78	197	1994–2005 Tianjin Teda
11	(China) **Yu Hanchao**	77	370	2010–2012 Liaoning FC; 2013–2014 Dalian Yifang; 2014–present Guangzhou F.C.
12	(China) Li Bing	76	204	1994 Liaoning FC; 1995–1996 Guangdong Hongyuan; 1997–2002 Sichuan FC
13	(China) Wang Peng	73	297	1996–2004 & 2007 Dalian Shide; 2005 Sichuan FC; 2006 & 2007–2009 Shaanxi Chanba
14	(Brazil) Ricardo Goulart	71	104	2015–2018 Guangzhou F.C.
14	(Colombia) Giovanni Moreno	71	223	2012–2021 Shanghai Shenhua
16	(Brazil) Tiago Jorge Honorio	67	155	2000–2004 Shenzhen Shangqingyin; 2006 Shanghai Liancheng; 2007–2008 Beijing Guoan
17	(China) Su Maozhen	64	165	1994–2002 Shandong Luneng
18	(Honduras) Luis Alfredo Ramírez	63	142	2006 Shanghai Shenhua; 2007–2009 Guangzhou Pharmaceutical; 2010–2011 Hangzhou Greentown
19	(China) Li Yi	59	225	1999 Beijing Guoan; 2000–2006 Shenzhen Shangqingyin; 2007–2010 Shaanxi Chanba
20	(China) Zhang Yuning	56	124	1999–2002 Liaoning FC; 2003–2007 Shanghai Shenhua
21	(Brazil) Aloisio	53	104	2014–2017 Shandong Luneng
19 October 2019 (Bold denotes players still in CSL)

=== Top scoring foreign players ===
Top scoring foreign players in Chinese Professional League since 1994 (League goals only)
Rank	Player	Goals	Caps	Clubs (only in Jia-A & CSL, the clubs are listed with current name)
1	(China) **Ai Kesen**	102	155	2013–2015 Guangzhou F.C.; 2016–2019 Shanghai SIPG; 2019–present Guangzhou F.C.
2	(Israel) Eran Zahavi	85	94	2016–present Guangzhou R&F
3	(Brazil) Ricardo Goulart	71	104	2015–2018 Guangzhou F.C.
4	(Zambia) James Chamanga	70	217	2008–2012 Dalian Shide; 2013–2017 Liaoning Hongyun
5	(Brazil) Tiago Jorge Honorio	66	157	2000–2004 Shenzhen Shangqingyin; 2006 Shanghai Liancheng; 2007, 2008 Beijing Guoan; 2010 Shenzhen Ruby
6	(Honduras) Luis Alfredo Ramírez	63	143	2006 Shanghai Shenhua; 2007–2009 Guangzhou Pharmaceutical; 2010–2011 Hangzhou Greentown
7	(Colombia) **Giovanni Moreno**	59	176	2012–present Shanghai Shenhua
8	(Brazil) Aloísio	53	103	2014–2017 Shandong Luneng; 2016–present Hebei China Fortune
9	(Paraguay) Casiano Wilberto Delvalle Ruiz	51	95	1997–1999 & 2002–2003 Beijing Guoan; 2000–2001 Shandong Luneng
10	(Bulgaria) Zoran Janković	50	119	2002–2007 Dalian Shide;
11	(Argentina) Darío Conca	46	111	2011–2013 Guangzhou F.C.; 2015–2016 Shanghai SIPG
12	(Nigeria) **Odion Ighalo**	43	64	2017– Changchun Yatai
13	(Brazil) Muriqui	43	86	2010–2014 & 2017 Guangzhou F.C.
14	(Lebanon) Roda Antar	42	183	2009–2014 Shandong Luneng; 2014–2015 Jiangsu Guoxin-Sainty; 2015 Hangzhou Greentown;
15	(Brazil) Diego Tardelli	41	73	2015–2018 Shandong Luneng
16	(Ghana) Kwame Ayew	40	84	2003 Changsha Ginde; 2004–2006 Shaanxi Chanba
17	(Serbia) Branko Jelić	40	97	2003–2005 Beijing Guoan; 2006–2007 Xiamen Bluelion;
18	(Brazil) Vicente de Paula Neto	40	144	2005 & 2007 Wuhan Guanggu; 2006 & 2008–2009 Shaanxi Chanba; 2010 Shanghai Shenhua
19	(Honduras) Saúl Martínez	39	113	2002–2005 & 2007 Shanghai Shenhua; 2006 Shanghai Liancheng
20	(Romania) Cristian Dănălache	37	73	2011–2013 Jiangsu Guoxin-Sainty
21	(Nigeria) Peter Utaka	37	80	2011–2013 Dalian Aerbin; 2013–2014 Beijing Guoan; 2014 Shanghai Shenxin
As of 23 May 2019 (Bold denotes players still in CSL)

== Appearances ==
=== All-time top appearances ===
The following table lists players who have played the most games within the top tier of Chinese football. Zou Yougen is the first player to make 300 or more appearances within the Jia-A or CSL League.

All-time appearances in the Chinese Top Level Professional League since 1994 (League appearances only)
Rank	Player	Caps	Position	Clubs (only in Jia-A & CSL, the clubs are listed with current name)
1	(China) Zou Yougen	313	Midfielder	1994–2005 Sichuan FC; 2006–2007 Xiamen Bluelion; 2008–2010 Chengdu Blades
2	(China) **Zhao Junzhe**	306	Midfielder	1999–present Liaoning FC
3	(China) **Xu Yunlong**	301	Defender	1999–Present Beijing Guoan
4	(China) Wang Peng	297	Striker/Midfielder	1996–2004 & 2007 Dalian Shide; 2005 Sichuan FC; 2006 & 2007–2009 Shaanxi Chanba
5	(China) Yuan Lin	286	Defender	1995–2011 Shenzhen Ping'an
6	(China) Yao Xia	281	Striker/Defender	1994–2002 Sichuan FC; 2003–2004 Qingdao Jonoon; 2008–2010 Chengdu Blades
7	(China) Shu Chang	275	Defender	1994–2010 Shandong Luneng
8	(China) Tao Wei	270	Midfielder	1998–2010 Beijing Guoan
8	(China) **Zhang Yaokun**	270	Defender	1998–present Dalian Shide; 2005 Sichuan Guancheng
9	(China) Xin Feng	269	Defender	1998–2003 & 2011 Shanghai Shenhua; 2003–2007 Shenzhen Jianlibao; 2008–2010 Shaanxi Chanba
10	(China) Wu Chengying	261	Defender/Midfielder	1994–2002 Shanghai Shenhua; 2003–2006 Shanghai International
11	(China) Li Jinyu	251	Striker	1999–2003 Liaoning FC; 2004–2010 Shandong Luneng
12	(China) Fu Bin	249	Goalkeeper	1994–1995 Yanbian FC; 1995–1997 Beijing Guoan; 1998–2003 Chongqing Lifan; 2008–2009 Chengdu Blades
13	(China) Li Ming	244	Midfielder	1994–2005 Dalian Shide
14	(China) Ou Chuliang	239	Goalkeeper	1994–1997 Guangdong Hongyuan; 1998–2000 Shanghai Shenhua; 2000–2003 Yunnan Hongta; 2004 Chongqing Lifan
As of 3 November 2011 (Bold denotes players still in CSL)

=== Top Appearance foreigner players ===
This section listed the foreign players who had most appearances in Chinese Top Level professional football leagues

Top Appearance foreigner players in top Chinese Professional League since 1994 (League appearances only)
Rank	Player	Caps	Position	Clubs (only in Jia-A & CSL, the clubs are listed with current name)
1	(Croatia) Darko Matić	219	Midfielder	2007–2008 Tianjin Teda; 2009–2015 Beijing Guoan;
2	(Zambia) James Chamanga	217	Striker	2008–2012 Dalian Shide; 2013–2017 Liaoning Hongyun
3	(Brazil) Tiago Jorge Honorio	155	Striker	2000–2004 & 2010 Shenzhen Shangqingyin; 2006 Shanghai Liancheng; 2007–2008 Beijing Guoan
4	(Colombia) **Giovanni Moreno**	152	Midfielder	2012–present Shanghai Shenhua
5	(Brazil) Adilson dos Santos	144	Defender	2000–2005 Dalian Shide;
6	(Brazil) Vicente de Paula Neto	144	Striker	2005 & 2007 Wuhan Guanggu; 2006 & 2008–2009 Shaanxi Chanba; 2010 Shanghai Shenhua
7	(Honduras) Luis Alfredo Ramírez	143	Striker	2006 Shanghai Shenhua; 2007–2009 Guangzhou Pharmaceutical; 2010–2011 Hangzhou Greentown
8	(Democratic Republic of the Congo) Zola Kiniambi	139	Midfielder	1997 & 1999–2000 Yanbian FC; 1998 Tianjin Teda 2001–2003 Chongqing Lifan;
9	(Serbia) Miodrag Pantelić	138	Midfielder	2000 & 2005–2006 Dalian Shide; 2003–2004 Sichuan FC; 2007 Beijing Guoan
10	(Serbia) Aleksandar Živković	128	Midfielder	2006–2009 Shandong Luneng; 2010 Shenzhen Ruby
11	(Brazil) Marcelo Marmelo da Silva	120	Striker	1995–1997 & 1999–2003 Sichuan FC;
12	(Bulgaria) Zoran Janković	119	Midfielder	2002–2007 Dalian Shide;
13	(Honduras) Saúl Martínez	113	Striker	2002–2005 & 2007 Shanghai Shenhua; 2006 Shanghai Liancheng
14	(Morocco) Abdeljalil El Hajji	111	Midfielder	1999 Sichuan FC; 2000–2001 Shenzhen Shangqingyin; 2002–2003 Chongqing Lifan
15	(Ukraine) Serguei Nagorniak	109	Striker	2000 Changsha Ginde; 2001–2003 Shandong Luneng;
16	(Brazil) Gilson Domingos Rezende Agostinho	102	Striker	2005–2007 Wuhan Guanggu; 2008 Henan Jianye
As of 15 August 2014 (Bold denotes players still in CSL)

== International performances by players ==
=== Scorer record in International club competition ===
scorer record of players representing Chinese clubs in International competition
Rank	Player	Goals	Caps	Clubs (listed with current name)
1	(China) Hao Haidong	29	39	Dalian Shide;
2	(Brazil) Muriqui	18	31	Guangzhou F.C.;
3	(Argentina) **Darío Conca**	18	34	Guangzhou F.C.; Shanghai SIPG
4	(Brazil) **Elkeson**	17	36	Guangzhou F.C.; Shanghai SIPG
5	(Brazil) Orlando Bernades da Silva	15	14	Dalian Shide; Shanghai Shenhua
6	(Brazil) **Ricardo Goulart**	11	20	Guangzhou F.C.;
7	(China) Zou Jie	11	28	Dalian Shide
8	(China) **Gao Lin**	11	47	Guangzhou F.C.;
9	(China) **Yang Xu**	10	15	Shandong Luneng;
10	(China) Han Peng	10	29	Shandong Luneng;
11	(China) Yan Song	10	32	Dalian Shide
As of 16 November 2016 (Bold denotes players still in CSL)

=== Appearance record in International club competition ===
Appearance record of players representing Chinese clubs in International competition
Rank	Player	Caps	Clubs (listed with current name)
1	(China) Hao Haidong	39	Dalian Shide
2	(China) Li Ming	35	Dalian Shide
3	(China) Ji Mingyi	34	Dalian Shide
4	(China) Yan Song	32	Dalian Shide
5	(China) Yuan Weiwei (Brazil) Muriqui	31	Shandong Luneng; Guangzhou F.C.
6	(Brazil) Adilson dos Santos (China) Wang Peng (China) **Han Peng** (China) **Cui Peng**	29	Dalian Shide; Dalian Shide; Shandong Luneng; Shandong Luneng
7	(China) **Hu Zhaojun** (China) Zou Jie (China) **Wang Sheng**	28	Dalian Shide; Dalian Shide; Dalian Shide
8	(China) **Zhang Yaokun**	26	Dalian Shide
9	(China) **Zheng Kewei**	25	Shanghai Shenhua; Hangzhou Greentown
10	(China) Shu Chang	24	Shandong Luneng
11	(China) **Lü Zheng** (China) **Liu Jindong** (China) **Jiao Zhe**	23	Shandong Luneng; Shandong Luneng; Shandong Luneng; Hangzhou Greentown
12	(China) Li Jinyu	22	Shandong Luneng
13	(China) Wang Tao	21	Dalian Shide; Beijing Guoan
14	(China) Zhang Enhua	20	Dalian Shide
As of 6 November 2011 (Bold denotes players still in CSL)

== Manager ==
=== Most matches in Charge ===
Managers With Most matches in Charge in Chinese Professional League since 1994 (League matches only)
Rank	Manager	Matches	Won	Drawn	Lost	Win%	Nationality	Clubs (listed with current name)
1	Lee Jang-Soo	268	118	84	66	44%	South Korea	1998–2001 Chongqing Lifan; 2002–2003 Qingdao Jonoon; 2007–2009 Beijing Guoan; 2010–2012 Guangzhou Evergrande
2	Shen Xiangfu	226	84	86	66	38.05%	China	1998–1999 & 2005–2006 Beijing Guoan; 2008–2009 Guangzhou Yiyao; 2010–2011 Changchun Yatai
3	Milorad Kosanović	182	86	46	50	47.30%	Serbia	1999 Wuhan Guanggu; 2000–2004 & 2008 Dalian Shide; 2010–2011Shaanxi Renhe
4	Cheng Yaodong	175	59	58	58	33.71%	China	2003–2009 Shaanxi Baorong
5	Yin Tiesheng	175	57	65	53	32.57%	China	1994–1998 Shandong Luneng; 2005–2008 Qingdao Jonoon
6	Ljubiša Tumbaković	164	90	43	31	54.88%	Serbia	2004–2009 Shandong Luneng
7	Wu Jingui	159	71	44	44	44.65%	China	2002–2003 & 2006 & 2007–2008 Shanghai Shenhua; 2009–2011 Hangzhou Greentown
8	Jia Xiuquan	154	44	61	49	28.57%	China	1994–1995 & 2001–2002 1 August; 2008 Henan Jianye; 2004 & 2008–2009 Shanghai Shenhua
9	Zhu Guanghu	151	63	55	33	41.72%	China	2000–2004 Shenzhen Xiangxue; 2008 Wuhan Guanggu; 2009–2010 Shaanxi Chanba
10	**Ma Lin**	150	52	41	57	34.67%	China	2003–2004 & 2008 & 2010–Present Liaoning FC; 2005 Chongqing Lifan
11	Tang Yaodong	145	45	47	53	31.03%	China	2005–2007 Liaoning FC; 2008–2010 Henan Jianye
12	Pei Encai	140	46	41	53	32.86%	China	1998–1999 & 2003 1 August; 2003–2005 & 2006–2007 Wuhan Guanggu; 2007 Henan Jianye; 2009–2010 Jiangsu Sainty
13	Qi Wusheng	126	43	35	48	34.13%	China	1998 Wuhan Guanggu; 2000–2003 Yunnan Hongta; 2004 Tianjin Teda
14	Chi Shangbin	124	50	35	39	40.32%	China	1995–1997 Dalian Shide; 1998 Sichuan FC; 2005 Shenzhen Xiangxue
15	Valery Nepomnyashchy	117	46	33	38	39.32%	Russia	2000 Changsha Ginde; 2002–2003 Shandong Luneng; 2004–2005 Shanghai Shenhua
16	Zhou Suian	110	35	35	40	31.82%	China	1994–1995 Guangzhou Apollo; 1996 Shenzhen Feiyada; 2007 & 2008–2009 Hangzhou Greentown
17	Jin Zhiyang	109	41	40	28	37.61%	China	1995–1997 Beijing Guoan; 1999–2000 Tianjin Teda
18	Xu Genbao	100	45	32	23	45.00%	China	1994–1996 & 2001–2002 Shanghai Shenhua; 1998–1999 Dalian Shide
As of 3 November 2011 (Bold denotes managers still in CSL)

=== League winning manager ===
this table listed manager of Chinese top level professional league Champions

Year	Manager	Club	Nationality
1994	Zhang Honggen	Dalian Wanda	China
1995	Xu Genbao	Shanghai Shenhua	China
1996	Chi Shangbin	Dalian Wanda	China
1997	Chi Shangbin	Dalian Wanda	China
1998	Xu Genbao	Dalian Wanda	China
1999	Slobodan Santrač	Shandong Luneng	Serbia
2000	Milorad Kosanović	Dalian Shide	Serbia
2001	Milorad Kosanović	Dalian Shide	Serbia
2002	Milorad Kosanović	Dalian Shide	Serbia
2003	Wu Jingui	Shanghai Shenhua	China
2004	Zhu Guanghu	Shenzhen Jianlibao	China
2005	Vladimir Petrović Pižon	Dalian Shide	Serbia
2006	Ljubiša Tumbaković	Shandong Luneng	Serbia
2007	Gao Hongbo	Changchun Yatai	China
2008	Ljubiša Tumbaković	Shandong Luneng	Serbia
2009	Hong Yuanshuo	Beijing Guoan	China
2010	Branko Ivanković	Shandong Luneng	Croatia
2011	Lee Jang-Soo	Guangzhou F.C.	South Korea
2012	Marcello Lippi	Guangzhou F.C.	Italy
2013	Marcello Lippi	Guangzhou F.C.	Italy
2014	Marcello Lippi	Guangzhou F.C.	Italy
2015	Luiz Felipe Scolari	Guangzhou F.C.	Brazil
2016	Luiz Felipe Scolari	Guangzhou F.C.	Brazil
2017	Luiz Felipe Scolari	Guangzhou F.C.	Brazil

== All-time League Table ==
The All-Time League Table is a cumulative record of all match results, points and goals of every team that has played in the League since its inception in 1994. The table that follows is accurate as of the end of the Chinese Super League 2009 season. Teams in bold are part of the Chinese Super League 2010. Numbers in bold are the record (highest) numbers in each column.

Rank.	Club	Seasons	Pld	W	D	L	GF	GA	Pts	Titles won	Runners-up	3rd Place
1	**Dalian Shide**	**16**	**412**	**216**	110	86	**679**	399	**738**	**8**		2
2	**Shanghai Shenhua**	**16**	**412**	194	126	92	625	432	698	2	**8**	1
3	**Shandong Luneng**	**16**	**412**	191	107	114	631	469	666	3	1	2
4	**Beijing Guoan**	**16**	**412**	174	**134**	104	608	418	646	1	2	**5**
5	**Tianjin Teda**	14	364	131	116	117	464	436	509			
6	**Shenzhen Red Diamond**	13	346	110	113	123	374	411	440	1	1	
7	**Qingdao Jonoon**	14	368	104	110	**154**	357	446	422			
8	**Liaoning Hongyun**	12	312	112	76	124	426	450	401		1	1
9	Sichuan FC	12	296	101	94	101	386	388	389			2
10	**Changsha Ginde**	13	346	80	120	146	322	**471**	359			
11	Chongqing Lifan	11	288	75	94	119	293	381	319			
12	**Shaanxi Chanba**	8	220	77	72	71	268	243	303		1	1
13	August 1	8	196	49	69	78	189	266	210			1
14	**Guangzhou Yiyao**	7	174	53	58	63	208	220	206		1	
15	**Changchun Yatai**	4	116	55	31	30	180	127	196	1	1	
16	Yanbian FC	7	166	45	47	74	163	228	176			
17	Wuhan Guanggu	6	164	41	39	84	135	275	162			
18	Yunnan Hongta	4	108	37	28	43	118	129	139			
19	**Henan Jianye**	3	88	27	30	31	85	83	111			1
20	Guangdong Hongyuan	4	88	29	25	34	99	106	104			
21	Hangzhou Greentown	3	88	23	30	35	93	110	99			
22	Xiamen Lanshi	3	82	19	24	39	72	118	81			
23	Guangzhou Songri	3	74	19	21	34	57	95	78			
24	**Chengdu Blades**	2	60	18	17	25	62	76	71			
25	Shanghai United	2	54	14	19	21	50	60	61			
26	Shanxi Guoli	3	82	13	20	49	83	156	59			
27	**Jiangsu Sainty**	2	52	10	18	24	49	80	47			
28	**Nanchang Bayi**	0	0	0	0	0	0	0	0			

== League attendance ==
The attendance figures are announced by the league department of CFA. 1994–2001 Jia-A figures was corrected by Titan Sports., also on Blog.Sina.Com, the figures after 2002 was calculated from the record of the Official CFA site

Season	Total Att	Average Att	Highest Home Att By Team
1994	2,155,000	16,326	Sichuan Quanxing (40,000)
1995	3,140,280	23,790	Sichuan Quanxing (40,182)
1996	3,203,122	24,266	Shandong Luneng (42,272)
1997	2,801,100	21,220	Sichuan Quanxing (39,180)
1998	3,883,000	21,335	Shanghai Shenhua (39,713)
1999	3,623,500	19,909	Sichuan Quanxing (28,150)
2000	3,622,000	19,901	Dalian Shide (26,154)
2001	3,329,872	18,296	Shanxi Guoli (38,700)
2002	3,146,640	14,984	Beijing Guoan (32,429)
2003	3,719,700	17,710	Dalian Shide (30,500)
2004	1,430,600	10,838	Shandong Luneng (23,636)
2005	1,871,700	10,284	Shandong Luneng(26,000)
2006	2,228,300	10,611	Shandong Luneng (30,679)
2007	3,173,500	15,112	Shaanxi Chanba (24,643)
2008	3,065,280	13,444	Shandong Luneng (26,501)
2009	3,854,115	16,059	Beijing Guoan (36,805)
2010	3,499,304	14,581	Beijing Guoan (33,342)

== Awards ==
China used to have three main award series, they are:

Mr. China Football Award, started from 1994, voted by fans all over the country, to award the player of the year.

Three Golden Awards, organized by China Sports Daily, started from 1983, to award the best performance players in all kinds of tournament, not only in the leagues, the awards includes:
Player of the year – Golden Ball awards
Best Scorer of the year – Golden Boot awards
Referee of the year – Golden Whistle awards

Official CFA League awards, Is the Official League awards, Awarded by CFA, includes:
Most Valuable players of the league awards (MVP)
League Top Scorer awards
Manager of the year awards
Referee of the year awards
in 1999 season, three other items added as regular awards
Youth Player of the year awards (MYP)
Club of the year awards
Fair play club of the year awards
The league oscar also involve some occasional awards

In the year 2002, the three series above was merged into the Official CFA Annual Awards. It now includes:
Mr. Football League Golden Ball awards, also called MVP awards or Mr. China Football awards by some media
Best Scorer Golden Boot awards
Ref'e'ree of the year Golden Whistle awards
Manager of the year awards
Youth player of the year awards

=== Best player awards ===
==== Most Valuable Player of the League ====
Most Valuable players of the league awards; from the 2002 edition onwards, named Mr. Football League Golden Ball awards

Year	Footballer	Club	Nationality
1994	Li Bing	Liaoning Yuandong	China
1995	Fan Zhiyi	Shanghai Shenhua	China
1996	Su Maozhen	Shandong Luneng	China
1997	Jorge Luis Campos	Beijing Guoan	Paraguay
1998	Hao Haidong	Dalian Shide	China
1999	Qu Shengqing	Liaoning Fushun	China
2000	Zhang Enhua	Dalian Shide	China
2001	Li Tie	Liaoning Fushun	China
2002	Zheng Zhi	Shenzhen Ping'an	China
2003	Jörg Albertz	Shanghai Shenhua	Germany
2004	Zhao Junzhe	Liaoning Zhongyu	China
2005	Branko Jelić	Beijing Guoan	Serbia
2006	Zheng Zhi	Shandong Luneng	China
2007	Du Zhenyu	Changchun Yatai	China
2008	Emil Martínez	Shanghai Shenhua	Honduras
2009	Samuel Caballero	Changchun Yatai	Honduras
2010	Duvier Riascos	Shanghai Shenhua	Colombia
2011	Muriqui	Guangzhou F.C.	Brazil
2012	Cristian Dănălache	Jiangsu Sainty	Romania
2013	Darío Conca	Guangzhou F.C.	Argentina
2014	Elkeson	Guangzhou F.C.	Brazil
2015	Ricardo Goulart	Guangzhou F.C.	Brazil
2016	Ricardo Goulart	Guangzhou F.C.	Brazil
2017	Eran Zahavi	Guangzhou R&F	Israel

==== Mr. China Football ====
First awarded in the year 1994. It merged with the "Most Valuable Player of the League" award of the Official CFA Annual awards in 2002.

Year	Footballer	Club	Nationality
1994	Li Bing	Liaoning Yuandong	China
1995	Fan Zhiyi	Shanghai Shenhua	China
1996	Fan Zhiyi	Shanghai Shenhua	China
1997	Hao Haidong	Dalian Shide	China
1998	Hao Haidong	Dalian Shide	China
1999	Su Maozhen	Shandong Luneng	China
2000	Yang Chen	Eintracht Frankfurt	China
2001	Li Tie	Liaoning Fushun	China

==== Golden Ball Awards ====
It first awarded in the year 1983, and in the year 2002, merged with the "Most Valuable Player of the League" award of the Official CFA Annual awards

Year	Footballer	Club	Nationality
1983	Jia Xiuquan	August 1	China
1984	Jia Xiuquan	August 1	China
1985	Wang Zhenjie	August 1	China
1986	Jia Xiuquan	August 1	China
1987	Tang Yaodong	Liaoning Dongyao	China
1988	Zhang Huikang	Shanghai	China
1989	Mai Chao	Guangzhou Baiyun	China
1990	Wu Qunli	Guangzhou Baiyun	China
1991	Gao Hongbo	Beijing Shenzhou	China
1992	Fu Yubin	Liaoning Dongyao	China
1993	Wu Qunli	Guangzhou Baiyun	China
1994	Peng Weiguo	Guangzhou Apollo	China
1995	Fan Zhiyi	Shanghai Shenhua	China
1996	Fan Zhiyi	Shanghai Shenhua	China
1997	Hao Haidong	Dalian Shide	China
1998	Hao Haidong	Dalian Shide	China
1999	Su Maozhen	Shandong Luneng	China
2000	Zhang Enhua	Dalian Shide	China
2001	Li Tie	Liaoning Fushun	China

=== Top Scorer of the League ===
It first awarded in the year 1980

Year	Footballer	Goals	Club	Nationality
1980	Huang Xiangdong; Li Shubin; Wang Qunfa	11	Chengdu Army; Liaoning; Tianjin	China; China; China
1981	Huang Junwei	25	Guangdong	China
1982	Xu Yonglai	19	Shandong	China
1983	Huang Dexing	16	Nanjing Army	China
1984	Huang Dexing; Xu Shugang	20	Nanjing Army; Beijing Army	China; China
1985	Wang Xuelong	13	Dalian Pearl	China
1986	Zhou Xuping	10	August 1	China
1987	Yang Weijian; Huo Jianting; Wang Jun	5	Shandong Taishan; Tianjin Seagul; Liaoning Dongyao	China; China; China
1988	Tang Quanshun	14	Shanghai Santana	China
1989	Gao Hongbo	6	China B	China
1990	Zhu Youhong; Shen Yi; Zuo Shufa	6	Shenzhou Shanghai; Tianjin Zhonghuan; Tianjin Zhonghuan	China; China; China
1991	Sun Wei	13	Liaoning Dongyao	China
1992	Gao Hongbo	11	Beijing Guoan	China
1993	Gao Feng	6	Beijing Guoan	China
1994	Hu Zhijun	17	Guangzhou Apollo	China
1995	Fan Zhiyi	15	Shanghai Shenhua	China
1996	Su Maozhen	13	Shandong Taishan	China
1997	Hao Haidong	14	Dalian Shide	China
1998	Hao Haidong	18	Dalian Shide	China
1999	Qu Shengqing	17	Liaoning Fushun	China
2000	Casiano Wilberto Delvalle Ruiz	15	Shandong Luneng	Paraguay
2001	Hao Haidong	16	Dalian Shide	China
2002	Li Jinyu	16	Liaoning Fushun	China
2003	Saúl Martínez; Kwame Ayew	14	Shanghai Shenhua; Shenyang Ginde	Honduras; Ghana
2004	Kwame Ayew	17	Inter Shanghai	Ghana
2005	Branko Jelić	21	Beijing Guoan	Serbia
2006	Li Jinyu	26	Shandong Luneng	China
2007	Li Jinyu	15	Shandong Luneng	China
2008	Éber Luís Cucchi	14	Tianjin Teda	Brazil
2009	Luis Alfredo Ramírez; Hernán Barcos	17	Guangzhou GPC; Shenzhen Asia Travel	Honduras; Argentina
2010	Duvier Riascos	20	Shanghai Shenhua	Colombia
2011	Muriqui	16	Guangzhou F.C.	Brazil
2012	Cristian Dănălache	23	Jiangsu Sainty	Romania
2013	Elkeson	24	Guangzhou F.C.	Brazil
2014	Elkeson	28	Guangzhou F.C.	Brazil
2015	Aloísio	22	Shandong Luneng	Brazil
2016	Ricardo Goulart	19	Guangzhou F.C.	Brazil
2017	Eran Zahavi	27	Guangzhou R&F	Israel

=== Manager of the year ===
The award does not necessarily go to the manager of the champions.

Year	Manager	Club	Standings	Nationality
1994	Zhang Honggen	Dalian Wanda	Jia-A League Champions	China
1995	Xu Genbao	Shanghai Shenhua	Jia-A League Champions	China
1996	Chi Shangbin	Dalian Wanda	Jia-A League Champions	China
1997	Chi Shangbin	Dalian Wanda	Jia-A League Champions	China
1998	Xu Genbao	Dalian Wanda	Jia-A League Champions	China
1999	Slobodan Santrač	Shandong Luneng	Jia-A League Champions; Chinese FA Cup Winners	Serbia
2000	Lee Jang-Soo	Chongqing Longxin	Chinese FA Cup winners, Jia-A League 4th place	South Korea
2001	Milorad Kosanović	Dalian Shide	Jia-A League Champions; Chinese FA Cup Winners	Serbia
2002	Zhu Guanghu	Shenzhen Ping'an	Jia-A League Runners-up	China
2003	Wu Jingui	Shanghai Shenhua	Jia-A League Champions	China
2004	Zhu Guanghu	Shenzhen Jianlibao	Chinese Super League Champions	China
2005	Vladimir Petrović Pižon	Dalian Shide	Chinese Super League Champions; Chinese FA Cup Winners	Serbia
2006	Ljubiša Tumbaković	Shandong Luneng	Chinese Super League Champions; Chinese FA Cup Winners	Serbia
2007	Gao Hongbo	Changchun Yatai	Chinese Super League Champions	China
2008	Ljubiša Tumbaković	Shandong Luneng	Chinese Super League Champions	Serbia
2009	Tang Yaodong	Henan Construction	Chinese Super League 3rd place	China
2010	Branko Ivanković	Shandong Luneng Taishan	Chinese Super League champions	Croatia
2011	Ma Lin	Liaoning Whowin	Chinese Super League third place	China
2012	Dragan Okuka	Jiangsu Sainty	Chinese Super League runners-up	Serbia
2013	Marcello Lippi	Guangzhou F.C.	Chinese Super League champions	Italy
2014	Gregorio Manzano	Beijing Guoan	Chinese Super League runners-up	Spain

=== Youth player of the year ===
Year	Footballer	Club	Nationality
1999	Zhang Xiaorui	Tianjin Teda	China
2000	Qu Bo	Qingdao Yizhong	China
2001	Zou Jie	Dalian Shide	China
2002	Xu Liang	Liaoning Fushun	China
2003	Liu Jindong	Shandong Luneng	China
2004	Chen Tao	Shenyang Ginde	China
2005	Hao Junmin	Tianjin Teda	China
2006	Wang Dalei	Shanghai Liancheng	China
2007	Hao Junmin	Tianjin Teda	China
2008	Huang Bowen	Beijing Guoan	China
2009	Deng Zhuoxiang	Jiangsu Sainty	China
2010	Zheng Zheng	Shandong Luneng Taishan	China
2011	Song Wenjie	Qingdao Jonoon	China
2012	Zhang Xizhe	Beijing Guoan	China
2013	Jin Jingdao	Shandong Luneng Taishan	China
2014	Liu Binbin	Shandong Luneng Taishan	China
2015	Vacant		

=== Team of the year ===
The Team of the Year is awarded by the Chinese Football Association, It first awarded in 1995, no award in 1998 & 2000, Voted by fans all-over China.

1995 Season '4–3–3'

Position	Footballer	Club	Nationality
GK	Ou Chuliang (1)	Guangdong Hongyuan	China
DF	Wei Qun (1)	Sichuan Quanxing	China
DF	Xu Hong (1)	Dalian Wanda	China
DF	Fan Zhiyi (1)	Shanghai Shenhua	China
DF	Li Hongjun (1)	Jilin Yanbian	China
MF	Peng Weiguo (1)	Guangzhou Apollo	China
MF	Gao Hongbo (2)	Beijing Guoan	China
MF	Cao Xiandong (1)	Beijing Guoan	China
FW	Hao Haidong (1)	August 1	China
FW	Li Bing (1)	Guangdong Hongyuan	China
FW	Gao Feng (1)	Beijing Guoan	China

1996 Season '4–4–2'

Position	Footballer	Club	Nationality
GK	Han Wenhai (1)	Dalian Wanda	China
DF	Wei Qun (2)	Sichuan Quanxing	China
DF	Xu Hong (2)	Dalian Wanda	China
DF	Zhang Enhua (1)	Dalian Wanda	China
DF	Wu Chengying (1)	Shanghai Shenhua	China
MF	Peng Weiguo (2)	Guangzhou Apollo	China
MF	Fan Zhiyi (2)	Shanghai Shenhua	China
MF	Ma Mingyu (1)	Guangdong Hongyuan	China
MF	Cao Xiandong (2)	Beijing Guoan	China
FW	Hao Haidong (2)	August 1	China
FW	Gao Feng (2)	Beijing Guoan	China

1997 Season '4–4–2'

Position	Footballer	Club	Nationality
GK	Ou Chuliang (2)	Guangdong Hongyuan	China
DF	Xie Feng (1)	Beijing Guoan	China
DF	Xu Hong (3)	Dalian Wanda	China
DF	Zhang Enhua (2)	Dalian Wanda	China
DF	Sun Jihai (1)	Dalian Wanda	China
MF	Li Ming (1)	Dalian Wanda	China
MF	Fan Zhiyi (3)	Shanghai Shenhua	China
MF	Liu Jun (1)	Shanghai Shenhua	China
MF	Ma Mingyu (2)	Sichuan Quanxing	China
FW	Hao Haidong (3)	Dalian Wanda	China
FW	Gao Feng (3)	Beijing Guoan	China

1999 Season '4–4–2'

Position	Footballer	Club	Nationality
GK	Gao Jianbin (1)	Sichuan Quanxing	China
DF	Zhang Enhua (3)	Dalian Wanda	China
DF	Li Weifeng (1)	Shenzhen Ping'an	China
DF	Xie Feng (2)	Shenzhen Ping'an	China
DF	Cheng Gang (1)	Qingdao Hainiu	China
MF	Li Tie (1)	Liaoning Fushun	China
MF	Ma Mingyu (3)	Sichuan Quanxing	China
MF	Zhang Xiaorui (1)	Tianjin Teda	China
MF	Li Xiaopeng (1)	Shandong Taishan	China
FW	Su Maozhen (1)	Shandong Taishan	China
FW	Qu Shengqing (1)	Liaoning Fushun	China

2001 Season '4–4–2'

Position	Footballer	Club	Nationality
GK	Liu Yunfei (1)	Tianjin Teda	China
DF	Li Weifeng (2)	Shenzhen Ping'an	China
DF	Sun Jihai (2)	Dalian Shide	China
DF	Wu Chengying (2)	Shanghai Shenhua	China
DF	Lula (1)	Sichuan Quanxing	Brazil
MF	Qi Hong (1)	Shanghai Shenhua	China
MF	Li Xiaopeng (2)	Shandong Luneng	China
MF	Li Tie (2)	Liaoning Fushun	China
MF	Ma Mingyu (4)	Sichuan Quanxing	China
FW	Hao Haidong (4)	Dalian Shide	China
FW	Marcos (1)	Shaanxi Guoli	Brazil

2002 Season '3–4–3'

Position	Footballer	Club	Nationality
GK	An Qi (1)	Dalian Shide	China
DF	Wu Chengying (3)	Shanghai Shenhua	China
DF	Zhang Enhua (4)	Dalian Shide	China
DF	Predrag Pazin (1)	Beijing Guoan	Bulgaria
MF	Shao Jiayi (1)	Beijing Guoan	China
MF	Zhao Junzhe (1)	Liaoning Fushun	China
MF	Zheng Zhi (1)	Shenzhen Ping'an	China
MF	Li Xiaopeng (3)	Shandong Luneng	China
FW	Casiano Delvalle (1)	Shandong Luneng	Paraguay
FW	Li Jinyu (1)	Liaoning Fushun	China
FW	Zoran Janković (1)	Dalian Shide	Bulgaria

2003 Season '4–4–2'

Position	Footballer	Club	Nationality
GK	Jiang Jin (1)	Inter Shanghai	China
DF	Adilson (1)	Dalian Shide	China
DF	Li Weifeng (3)	Shenzhen Jianlibao	China
DF	Du Wei (1)	Shanghai Shenhua	China
DF	Xu Yunlong (1)	Beijing Guoan	China
MF	Shen Si (1)	Inter Shanghai	China
MF	Zhao Junzhe (2)	Liaoning Zhongshun	China
MF	Jörg Albertz (1)	Shanghai Shenhua	Germany
MF	Zheng Zhi (2)	Shenzhen Jianlibao	China
FW	Saúl Martínez (1)	Shanghai Shenhua	Honduras
FW	Li Yi (1)	Shenzhen Jianlibao	China

Special Award 1994–2003 '4–4–2'

Position	Footballer	Club	Nationality
GK	Ou Chuliang	Guangdong Hongyuan/ Shanghai Shenhua/ Yunnan Hongta	China
DF	Wu Chengying	Shanghai Shenhua/ Inter Shanghai	China
DF	Du Wei	Shanghai Shenhua	China
DF	Fan Zhiyi	Shanghai Shenhua/Inter Shanghai	China
DF	Sun Jihai	Dalian Wanda	China
MF	Jorge Campos	Beijing Guoan	Paraguay
MF	Vaclav Nemecek	Dalian Wanda	Czech Republic
MF	Li Ming	Dalian Wanda	China
MF	Peng Weiguo	Guangzhou Apollo/Qianwei FC	China
FW	Hao Haidong	August 1/ Dalian Wanda	China
FW	Casiano Delvalle	Beijing Guoan/ Shandong Luneng	Paraguay

2004 Season '4–4–2'

Position	Footballer	Club	Nationality
GK	Li Leilei (1)	Shenzhen Jianlibao	China
DF	Jiao Zhe (1)	Shandong Luneng	China
DF	Xu Liang (1)	Liaoning Zhongyu	China
DF	Li Weifeng (4)	Shenzhen Jianlibao	China
DF	Zhang Yaokun (1)	Dalian Shide	China
MF	Zheng Zhi (3)	Shenzhen Jianlibao	China
MF	Yu Genwei (1)	Tianjin Teda	China
MF	Li Xiaopeng (4)	Shandong Luneng	China
MF	Tao Wei (1)	Beijing Guoan	China
FW	Li Jinyu (2)	Shandong Luneng	China
FW	Kwame Ayew (1)	Inter Shanghai	Ghana

2005 Season '4–4–2'

Position	Footballer	Club	Nationality
GK	Chen Dong (1)	Dalian Shide	China
DF	Sun Xiang (1)	Shanghai Shenhua	China
DF	Predrag Pazin (2)	Shandong Luneng	Bulgaria
DF	Ji Mingyi (1)	Dalian Shide	China
DF	Cao Yang (1)	Tianjin Teda	China
MF	Zheng Bin (1)	Wuhan Huanghelou	China
MF	Zoran Janković (2)	Dalian Shide	Bulgaria
MF	Zheng Zhi (4)	Shandong Luneng	China
MF	Hao Junmin (1)	Tianjin Teda	China
FW	Xie Hui (1)	Shanghai Shenhua	China
FW	Branko Jelić (1)	Beijing Guoan	Serbia

2006 Season '4–5–1'

Position	Footballer	Club	Nationality
GK	An Qi (2)	Xiamen Lanshi	China
DF	Samuel Caballero (1)	Changchun Yatai	Honduras
DF	Xu Yunlong (2)	Beijing Guoan	China
DF	Javier Martín Musa (1)	Beijing Guoan	Argentina
DF	Marko Zorić (1)	Tianjin Teda	Serbia
MF	Aleksandar Živković (1)	Shandong Luneng	Serbia
MF	Du Zhenyu (1)	Changchun Yatai	China
MF	Zheng Zhi (5)	Shandong Luneng	China
MF	Zou Yougen (1)	Xiamen Lanshi	China
MF	Wang Dong (1)	Changchun Yatai	China
FW	Li Jinyu (3)	Shandong Luneng	China

2007 Season '3–4–3'

Position	Footballer	Club	Nationality
GK	Yang Zhi (1)	Beijing Guoan	China
DF	Ivo Trenchev (1)	Henan Jianye	Bulgaria
DF	Samuel Caballero (2)	Changchun Yatai	Honduras
DF	Xu Yunlong (3)	Beijing Guoan	China
MF	Hao Junmin (2)	Tianjin Teda	China
MF	Tao Wei (2)	Beijing Guoan	China
MF	Liu Jian (1)	Qingdao Jonoon	China
MF	Aleksandar Živković (2)	Shandong Luneng	Serbia
FW	Li Jinyu (4)	Shandong Luneng	China
FW	Tiago (1)	Beijing Guoan	Brazil
FW	Du Zhenyu (2)	Changchun Yatai	China

2008 Season '4–4–2'

Position	Footballer	Club	Nationality
GK	Yang Zhi (2)	Beijing Guoan	China
DF	Cao Yang (2)	Tianjin Teda	China
DF	Alejandro Cichero (1)	Shandong Luneng	Venezuela
DF	Du Wei (2)	Shanghai Shenhua	China
DF	Xin Feng (1)	Shaanxi Baorong	China
MF	Emil Martínez (1)	Shanghai Shenhua	Honduras
MF	Du Zhenyu (3)	Changchun Yatai	China
MF	Tao Wei (3)	Beijing Guoan	China
MF	Aleksandar Živković (3)	Shandong Luneng	Serbia
FW	Johnson (1)	Shenzhen Shangqingyin	Angola
FW	Emmanuel Olisadebe (1)	Henan Jianye	Poland

2009 Season '3–4–3'

Position	Footballer	Club	Nationality
GK	Yang Zhi (3)	Beijing Guoan	China
DF	Zhao Peng (1)	Henan Jianye	China
DF	Samuel Caballero (3)	Changchun Yatai	Honduras
DF	Xu Yunlong (4)	Beijing Guoan	China
MF	James Chamanga (1)	Dalian Shide	Zambia
MF	Gabriel Melkam (1)	Changchun Yatai	Nigeria
MF	Darko Matić (1)	Beijing Guoan	Croatia
MF	Xu Liang (2)	Guangzhou Yiyao	China
FW	Qu Bo (1)	Qingdao Jonoon	China
FW	Luis Ramírez (1)	Guangzhou Yiyao	Honduras
FW	Hernán Barcos (1)	Shenzhen Red Diamonds	Argentina

2012 Season '4–4–2'

Position	Footballer	Club	Nationality
GK	Deng Xiaofei (1)	Jiangsu Sainty	China
DF	Sun Xiang (2)	Guangzhou F.C.	China
DF	Du Wei (3)	Shandong Luneng Taishan	China
DF	Dino Đulbić (1)	Guizhou Renhe	Australia
DF	Zheng Zheng (1)	Shandong Luneng Taishan	China
MF	Yu Hanchao (1)	Liaoning FC	China
MF	Zheng Zhi (6)	Guangzhou F.C.	China
MF	Darío Conca (1)	Guangzhou F.C.	Argentina
MF	Wang Yongpo (1)	Shandong Luneng Taishan	China
FW	Cristian Dănălache (1)	Jiangsu Sainty	Romania
FW	Gao Lin (1)	Guangzhou F.C.	China

2013 Season '4–4–2'

Position	Footballer	Club	Nationality
GK	Zeng Cheng (1)	Guangzhou F.C.	China
DF	Zhang Linpeng (1)	Guangzhou F.C.	China
DF	Xu Yunlong (5)	Beijing Guoan	China
DF	Kim Young-Gwon (1)	Guangzhou F.C.	South Korea
DF	Zheng Zheng (2)	Shandong Luneng Taishan	China
MF	Zheng Zhi (7)	Guangzhou F.C.	China
MF	Zhang Xizhe (1)	Beijing Guoan	China
MF	Darío Conca (2)	Guangzhou F.C.	Argentina
MF	Wang Yongpo (2)	Shandong Luneng Taishan	China
FW	Elkeson (1)	Guangzhou F.C.	Brazil
FW	Muriqui (1)	Guangzhou F.C.	Brazil

2014 Season '4–4–2'

Position	Footballer	Club	Nationality
GK	Wang Dalei (1)	Shandong Luneng Taishan	China
DF	Zhang Linpeng (2)	Guangzhou F.C.	China
DF	Xu Yunlong (6)	Beijing Guoan	China
DF	Kim Young-Gwon (2)	Guangzhou F.C.	South Korea
DF	Zheng Zheng (3)	Shandong Luneng Taishan	China
MF	Zheng Zhi (8)	Guangzhou F.C.	China
MF	Zhang Xizhe (2)	Beijing Guoan	China
MF	Giovanni Moreno (1)	Shanghai Shenhua	Colombia
MF	Davi (1)	Guangzhou R&F	Brazil
FW	Elkeson (2)	Guangzhou F.C.	Brazil
FW	Wu Lei (1)	Shanghai SIPG	China

2015 Season '4–4–2'

Position	Footballer	Club	Nationality
GK	Zeng Cheng (2)	Guangzhou F.C.	China
DF	Zhang Linpeng (3)	Guangzhou F.C.	China
DF	Kim Young-Gwon (3)	Guangzhou F.C.	South Korea
DF	Feng Xiaoting (1)	Guangzhou F.C.	China
DF	Xu Yunlong (7)	Beijing Guoan	China
MF	Zheng Zhi (9)	Guangzhou F.C.	China
MF	Darío Conca (3)	Shanghai SIPG	Argentina
MF	Huang Bowen (1)	Guangzhou F.C.	China
MF	Wu Xi (1)	Jiangsu Shuntian	China
FW	Goulart (1)	Guangzhou F.C.	Brazil
FW	Wu Lei (2)	Shanghai SIPG	China

2016 Season '4–4–2'

Position	Footballer	Club	Nationality
GK	Zeng Cheng (3)	Guangzhou F.C.	China
DF	Zhang Linpeng (4)	Guangzhou F.C.	China
DF	Kim Young-Gwon (4)	Guangzhou F.C.	South Korea
DF	Feng Xiaoting (2)	Guangzhou F.C.	China
DF	Jiang Zhipeng (1)	Guangzhou R&F	China
MF	Goulart (2)	Guangzhou F.C.	Brazil
MF	Wu Xi (2)	Jiangsu Suning	China
MF	Paulinho (1)	Guangzhou F.C.	Brazil
MF	Wu Lei (3)	Shanghai SIPG	China
FW	Demba Ba	Shanghai Shenhua (1)	Senegal
FW	Gao Lin	Guangzhou F.C. (2)	China

2017 Season '4–4–2'

Position	Footballer	Club	Nationality
GK	Yan Junling (1)	Shanghai SIPG	China
DF	Wang Shenchao (1)	Shanghai SIPG	China
DF	Huang Zhengyu (1)	Guangzhou R&F	China
DF	Feng Xiaoting (3)	Guangzhou F.C.	China
DF	Jiang Zhipeng (2)	Guangzhou R&F	China
MF	Wu Lei (4)	Shanghai SIPG	China
MF	Hao Junmin (3)	Shandong Luneng	China
MF	Eran Zahavi (1)	Guangzhou R&F	Israel
MF	Goulart (3)	Guangzhou F.C.	Brazil
FW	Gao Lin (3)	Guangzhou F.C.	China
FW	Hulk (1)	Shanghai SIPG	Brazil

== Other Records ==
As of October 20, 2012

=== Individual Player ===
for top scorers, see statistics above

- Most goals is a single season: 29 goals

(Israel) Eran Zahavi for Guangzhou R&F (2019)

- Most goals in a game : 4 goals

(China) Hu Zhijun for Guangzhou Apollo vs Shanghai Shenhua (14 August 1994)
(China) Hao Haidong for Dalian Wanda vs Guangdong Hongyuan (10 December 1997)
(China) Zou Jie for Dalian Shide vs August 1 (8 July 2001)
(China) Li Bing for Sichuan Dahe vs Liaoning Bird (14 April 2002)
(Ghana) Kwame Ayew for Shaanxi Baorong vs Dalian Shide (21 October 2004)
(China) Li Jinyu for Shandong Luneng vs Liaoning FC (21 May 2006)
(Honduras) Elvis Scott for Changchun Yatai vs Shanghai Shenhua (27 May 2007)
(Brazil) Éber Luís Cucchi for Tianjin Teda vs Dalian Shide (30 November 2008)
(Nigeria) Peter Utaka for Dalian Aerbin vs Hangzhou Greentown (30 June 2013)
(Israel) Eran Zahavi for Guangzhou R&F vs Yanbian Funde (23 July 2017)

- Most career hat-tricks : 6 times

(China) Hao Haidong

- Fastest hat-trick : 10 minutes

(China) Li Jinyu for Shandong Luneng vs Liaoning FC (21 May 2006)

- Youngest player : 15 years 9 months and 26 days

(China) Ma Yiming for Shanghai Zobon vs Sichuan FC (22 May 2005)

- Youngest goalscorer : 16 years 9 months and 26 days

(China) Huang Bowen for Beijing Guoan vs Shenyang Ginde (26 May 2004)

- Fastest goal : 7 seconds

(China) Ji Xiang for Jiangsu Sainty vs Guangzhou Evergrande (20 October 2012)

- Most consecutive clean-sheets: 675 minutes

(China) Sun Gang for Shenzhen Ping'an (started on June 17, 2001, 0–2 v Liaoning Hongyun, 77' of the match; ended on October 28, 2001, 0–3 v Dalian Shide, 31' of the match)

=== Club ===
- Most League championships : 8 times
  - Dalian Shide (1994, 1996, 1997, 1998, 2000, 2001, 2002, 2005)
- Longest uninterrupted spell in Top Division: 15 years (1993–present)
  - Beijing Guoan
  - Shandong Luneng
  - Shanghai Shenhua
- Most goals scored in a season : 78 goals
  - Guangzhou F.C. (2013)
- Fewest goals scored in a season : 10 goals
  - Guangzhou Songri (1996)
- Most goals conceded in a season : 69 goals
  - Changsha Ginde (2001)
- Fewest goals conceded in a season : 13 goals
  - Shandong Luneng (1999)
- Biggest goal difference in a season : 60 goals
  - Guangzhou F.C. (2013)
- Most points in a season : 77 points
  - Guangzhou F.C. (2013)
- Fewest points in a season : 7 points
  - Shenyang Ginde (2001)
- Longest unbeaten streak : 55 matches

Dalian Shide (1995–1997) (started on September 03 1995, 1–0 v Guangzhou Apollo; ended on December 21, 1998, 2–4 v Shanghai Shenhua)

- Most wins in a season : 24 wins

Guangzhou F.C. (2013)

- Fewest wins in a season : 1 wins
  - Changsha Ginde (1994)
  - Jiangsu Shuntian (1994)
- Most draws in a season : 14 draws
  - Shaanxi Baorong (2007)
- Most losses in a season : 23 losses
  - Changsha Ginde (2001)
- Fewest losses in a season : 0 losses
  - Dalian Shide (1996)
- Most goals in a game : 10 goals
  - Beijing Guoan 9–1 Shanghai Shenhua (20 July 1997)
- Record win : 9–1, 8–0
  - Beijing Guoan 9–1 Shanghai Shenhua (20 July 1997)
  - Dalian Shide 8–0 Bayi Football Team (8 July 2001)
  - Shanghai SIPG 8–0 Dalian Yifang (3 March 2018)
- Highest scoring draw: 4–4
  - Sichuan FC 4–4 Shandong Luneng (26 November 2003)
  - Liaoning Hongyun 4–4 Shanghai Shenhua (12 November 2008)

== Appearances ==
=== All-time top appearances ===
The following table lists players who have played the most games within the top tier of Chinese football. Zou Yougen is the first player to make 300 or more appearances within the Jia-A or CSL League.

All-time appearances in the Chinese Top Level Professional League since 1994 (League appearances only)
Rank	Player	Caps	Position	Clubs (only in Jia-A & CSL, the clubs are listed with current name)
1	(China) Zou Yougen	313	Midfielder	1994–2005 Sichuan FC; 2006–2007 Xiamen Bluelion; 2008–2010 Chengdu Blades
2	(China) **Zhao Junzhe**	306	Midfielder	1999–present Liaoning FC
3	(China) **Xu Yunlong**	301	Defender	1999–Present Beijing Guoan
4	(China) Wang Peng	297	Striker/Midfielder	1996–2004 & 2007 Dalian Shide; 2005 Sichuan FC; 2006 & 2007–2009 Shaanxi Chanba
5	(China) Yuan Lin	286	Defender	1995–2011 Shenzhen Ping'an
6	(China) Yao Xia	281	Striker/Defender	1994–2002 Sichuan FC; 2003–2004 Qingdao Jonoon; 2008–2010 Chengdu Blades
7	(China) Shu Chang	275	Defender	1994–2010 Shandong Luneng
8	(China) Tao Wei	270	Midfielder	1998–2010 Beijing Guoan
8	(China) **Zhang Yaokun**	270	Defender	1998–present Dalian Shide; 2005 Sichuan Guancheng
9	(China) Xin Feng	269	Defender	1998–2003 & 2011 Shanghai Shenhua; 2003–2007 Shenzhen Jianlibao; 2008–2010 Shaanxi Chanba
10	(China) Wu Chengying	261	Defender/Midfielder	1994–2002 Shanghai Shenhua; 2003–2006 Shanghai International
11	(China) Li Jinyu	251	Striker	1999–2003 Liaoning FC; 2004–2010 Shandong Luneng
12	(China) Fu Bin	249	Goalkeeper	1994–1995 Yanbian FC; 1995–1997 Beijing Guoan; 1998–2003 Chongqing Lifan; 2008–2009 Chengdu Blades
13	(China) Li Ming	244	Midfielder	1994–2005 Dalian Shide
14	(China) Ou Chuliang	239	Goalkeeper	1994–1997 Guangdong Hongyuan; 1998–2000 Shanghai Shenhua; 2000–2003 Yunnan Hongta; 2004 Chongqing Lifan
As of 3 November 2011 (Bold denotes players still in CSL)

=== Top Appearance foreigner players ===
This section listed the foreign players who had most appearances in Chinese Top Level professional football leagues

Top Appearance foreigner players in top Chinese Professional League since 1994 (League appearances only)
Rank	Player	Caps	Position	Clubs (only in Jia-A & CSL, the clubs are listed with current name)
1	(Croatia) Darko Matić	219	Midfielder	2007–2008 Tianjin Teda; 2009–2015 Beijing Guoan;
2	(Zambia) James Chamanga	217	Striker	2008–2012 Dalian Shide; 2013–2017 Liaoning Hongyun
3	(Brazil) Tiago Jorge Honorio	155	Striker	2000–2004 & 2010 Shenzhen Shangqingyin; 2006 Shanghai Liancheng; 2007–2008 Beijing Guoan
4	(Colombia) **Giovanni Moreno**	152	Midfielder	2012–present Shanghai Shenhua
5	(Brazil) Adilson dos Santos	144	Defender	2000–2005 Dalian Shide;
6	(Brazil) Vicente de Paula Neto	144	Striker	2005 & 2007 Wuhan Guanggu; 2006 & 2008–2009 Shaanxi Chanba; 2010 Shanghai Shenhua
7	(Honduras) Luis Alfredo Ramírez	143	Striker	2006 Shanghai Shenhua; 2007–2009 Guangzhou Pharmaceutical; 2010–2011 Hangzhou Greentown
8	(Democratic Republic of the Congo) Zola Kiniambi	139	Midfielder	1997 & 1999–2000 Yanbian FC; 1998 Tianjin Teda 2001–2003 Chongqing Lifan;
9	(Serbia) Miodrag Pantelić	138	Midfielder	2000 & 2005–2006 Dalian Shide; 2003–2004 Sichuan FC; 2007 Beijing Guoan
10	(Serbia) Aleksandar Živković	128	Midfielder	2006–2009 Shandong Luneng; 2010 Shenzhen Ruby
11	(Brazil) Marcelo Marmelo da Silva	120	Striker	1995–1997 & 1999–2003 Sichuan FC;
12	(Bulgaria) Zoran Janković	119	Midfielder	2002–2007 Dalian Shide;
13	(Honduras) Saúl Martínez	113	Striker	2002–2005 & 2007 Shanghai Shenhua; 2006 Shanghai Liancheng
14	(Morocco) Abdeljalil El Hajji	111	Midfielder	1999 Sichuan FC; 2000–2001 Shenzhen Shangqingyin; 2002–2003 Chongqing Lifan
15	(Ukraine) Serguei Nagorniak	109	Striker	2000 Changsha Ginde; 2001–2003 Shandong Luneng;
16	(Brazil) Gilson Domingos Rezende Agostinho	102	Striker	2005–2007 Wuhan Guanggu; 2008 Henan Jianye
As of 15 August 2014 (Bold denotes players still in CSL)

== International performances by players ==
=== Scorer record in International club competition ===
scorer record of players representing Chinese clubs in International competition
Rank	Player	Goals	Caps	Clubs (listed with current name)
1	(China) Hao Haidong	29	39	Dalian Shide;
2	(Brazil) Muriqui	18	31	Guangzhou F.C.;
3	(Argentina) **Darío Conca**	18	34	Guangzhou F.C.; Shanghai SIPG
4	(Brazil) **Elkeson**	17	36	Guangzhou F.C.; Shanghai SIPG
5	(Brazil) Orlando Bernades da Silva	15	14	Dalian Shide; Shanghai Shenhua
6	(Brazil) **Ricardo Goulart**	11	20	Guangzhou F.C.;
7	(China) Zou Jie	11	28	Dalian Shide
8	(China) **Gao Lin**	11	47	Guangzhou F.C.;
9	(China) **Yang Xu**	10	15	Shandong Luneng;
10	(China) Han Peng	10	29	Shandong Luneng;
11	(China) Yan Song	10	32	Dalian Shide
As of 16 November 2016 (Bold denotes players still in CSL)

=== Appearance record in International club competition ===
Appearance record of players representing Chinese clubs in International competition
Rank	Player	Caps	Clubs (listed with current name)
1	(China) Hao Haidong	39	Dalian Shide
2	(China) Li Ming	35	Dalian Shide
3	(China) Ji Mingyi	34	Dalian Shide
4	(China) Yan Song	32	Dalian Shide
5	(China) Yuan Weiwei (Brazil) Muriqui	31	Shandong Luneng; Guangzhou F.C.
6	(Brazil) Adilson dos Santos (China) Wang Peng (China) **Han Peng** (China) **Cui Peng**	29	Dalian Shide; Dalian Shide; Shandong Luneng; Shandong Luneng
7	(China) **Hu Zhaojun** (China) Zou Jie (China) **Wang Sheng**	28	Dalian Shide; Dalian Shide; Dalian Shide
8	(China) **Zhang Yaokun**	26	Dalian Shide
9	(China) **Zheng Kewei**	25	Shanghai Shenhua; Hangzhou Greentown
10	(China) Shu Chang	24	Shandong Luneng
11	(China) **Lü Zheng** (China) **Liu Jindong** (China) **Jiao Zhe**	23	Shandong Luneng; Shandong Luneng; Shandong Luneng; Hangzhou Greentown
12	(China) Li Jinyu	22	Shandong Luneng
13	(China) Wang Tao	21	Dalian Shide; Beijing Guoan
14	(China) Zhang Enhua	20	Dalian Shide
As of 6 November 2011 (Bold denotes players still in CSL)

== Manager ==
=== Most matches in Charge ===
Managers With Most matches in Charge in Chinese Professional League since 1994 (League matches only)
Rank	Manager	Matches	Won	Drawn	Lost	Win%	Nationality	Clubs (listed with current name)
1	Lee Jang-Soo	268	118	84	66	44%	South Korea	1998–2001 Chongqing Lifan; 2002–2003 Qingdao Jonoon; 2007–2009 Beijing Guoan; 2010–2012 Guangzhou Evergrande
2	Shen Xiangfu	226	84	86	66	38.05%	China	1998–1999 & 2005–2006 Beijing Guoan; 2008–2009 Guangzhou Yiyao; 2010–2011 Changchun Yatai
3	Milorad Kosanović	182	86	46	50	47.30%	Serbia	1999 Wuhan Guanggu; 2000–2004 & 2008 Dalian Shide; 2010–2011Shaanxi Renhe
4	Cheng Yaodong	175	59	58	58	33.71%	China	2003–2009 Shaanxi Baorong
5	Yin Tiesheng	175	57	65	53	32.57%	China	1994–1998 Shandong Luneng; 2005–2008 Qingdao Jonoon
6	Ljubiša Tumbaković	164	90	43	31	54.88%	Serbia	2004–2009 Shandong Luneng
7	Wu Jingui	159	71	44	44	44.65%	China	2002–2003 & 2006 & 2007–2008 Shanghai Shenhua; 2009–2011 Hangzhou Greentown
8	Jia Xiuquan	154	44	61	49	28.57%	China	1994–1995 & 2001–2002 1 August; 2008 Henan Jianye; 2004 & 2008–2009 Shanghai Shenhua
9	Zhu Guanghu	151	63	55	33	41.72%	China	2000–2004 Shenzhen Xiangxue; 2008 Wuhan Guanggu; 2009–2010 Shaanxi Chanba
10	**Ma Lin**	150	52	41	57	34.67%	China	2003–2004 & 2008 & 2010–Present Liaoning FC; 2005 Chongqing Lifan
11	Tang Yaodong	145	45	47	53	31.03%	China	2005–2007 Liaoning FC; 2008–2010 Henan Jianye
12	Pei Encai	140	46	41	53	32.86%	China	1998–1999 & 2003 1 August; 2003–2005 & 2006–2007 Wuhan Guanggu; 2007 Henan Jianye; 2009–2010 Jiangsu Sainty
13	Qi Wusheng	126	43	35	48	34.13%	China	1998 Wuhan Guanggu; 2000–2003 Yunnan Hongta; 2004 Tianjin Teda
14	Chi Shangbin	124	50	35	39	40.32%	China	1995–1997 Dalian Shide; 1998 Sichuan FC; 2005 Shenzhen Xiangxue
15	Valery Nepomnyashchy	117	46	33	38	39.32%	Russia	2000 Changsha Ginde; 2002–2003 Shandong Luneng; 2004–2005 Shanghai Shenhua
16	Zhou Suian	110	35	35	40	31.82%	China	1994–1995 Guangzhou Apollo; 1996 Shenzhen Feiyada; 2007 & 2008–2009 Hangzhou Greentown
17	Jin Zhiyang	109	41	40	28	37.61%	China	1995–1997 Beijing Guoan; 1999–2000 Tianjin Teda
18	Xu Genbao	100	45	32	23	45.00%	China	1994–1996 & 2001–2002 Shanghai Shenhua; 1998–1999 Dalian Shide
As of 3 November 2011 (Bold denotes managers still in CSL)

=== League winning manager ===
this table listed manager of Chinese top level professional league Champions

Year	Manager	Club	Nationality
1994	Zhang Honggen	Dalian Wanda	China
1995	Xu Genbao	Shanghai Shenhua	China
1996	Chi Shangbin	Dalian Wanda	China
1997	Chi Shangbin	Dalian Wanda	China
1998	Xu Genbao	Dalian Wanda	China
1999	Slobodan Santrač	Shandong Luneng	Serbia
2000	Milorad Kosanović	Dalian Shide	Serbia
2001	Milorad Kosanović	Dalian Shide	Serbia
2002	Milorad Kosanović	Dalian Shide	Serbia
2003	Wu Jingui	Shanghai Shenhua	China
2004	Zhu Guanghu	Shenzhen Jianlibao	China
2005	Vladimir Petrović Pižon	Dalian Shide	Serbia
2006	Ljubiša Tumbaković	Shandong Luneng	Serbia
2007	Gao Hongbo	Changchun Yatai	China
2008	Ljubiša Tumbaković	Shandong Luneng	Serbia
2009	Hong Yuanshuo	Beijing Guoan	China
2010	Branko Ivanković	Shandong Luneng	Croatia
2011	Lee Jang-Soo	Guangzhou F.C.	South Korea
2012	Marcello Lippi	Guangzhou F.C.	Italy
2013	Marcello Lippi	Guangzhou F.C.	Italy
2014	Marcello Lippi	Guangzhou F.C.	Italy
2015	Luiz Felipe Scolari	Guangzhou F.C.	Brazil
2016	Luiz Felipe Scolari	Guangzhou F.C.	Brazil
2017	Luiz Felipe Scolari	Guangzhou F.C.	Brazil

== All-time League Table ==
The All-Time League Table is a cumulative record of all match results, points and goals of every team that has played in the League since its inception in 1994. The table that follows is accurate as of the end of the Chinese Super League 2009 season. Teams in bold are part of the Chinese Super League 2010. Numbers in bold are the record (highest) numbers in each column.

Rank.	Club	Seasons	Pld	W	D	L	GF	GA	Pts	Titles won	Runners-up	3rd Place
1	**Dalian Shide**	**16**	**412**	**216**	110	86	**679**	399	**738**	**8**		2
2	**Shanghai Shenhua**	**16**	**412**	194	126	92	625	432	698	2	**8**	1
3	**Shandong Luneng**	**16**	**412**	191	107	114	631	469	666	3	1	2
4	**Beijing Guoan**	**16**	**412**	174	**134**	104	608	418	646	1	2	**5**
5	**Tianjin Teda**	14	364	131	116	117	464	436	509			
6	**Shenzhen Red Diamond**	13	346	110	113	123	374	411	440	1	1	
7	**Qingdao Jonoon**	14	368	104	110	**154**	357	446	422			
8	**Liaoning Hongyun**	12	312	112	76	124	426	450	401		1	1
9	Sichuan FC	12	296	101	94	101	386	388	389			2
10	**Changsha Ginde**	13	346	80	120	146	322	**471**	359			
11	Chongqing Lifan	11	288	75	94	119	293	381	319			
12	**Shaanxi Chanba**	8	220	77	72	71	268	243	303		1	1
13	August 1	8	196	49	69	78	189	266	210			1
14	**Guangzhou Yiyao**	7	174	53	58	63	208	220	206		1	
15	**Changchun Yatai**	4	116	55	31	30	180	127	196	1	1	
16	Yanbian FC	7	166	45	47	74	163	228	176			
17	Wuhan Guanggu	6	164	41	39	84	135	275	162			
18	Yunnan Hongta	4	108	37	28	43	118	129	139			
19	**Henan Jianye**	3	88	27	30	31	85	83	111			1
20	Guangdong Hongyuan	4	88	29	25	34	99	106	104			
21	Hangzhou Greentown	3	88	23	30	35	93	110	99			
22	Xiamen Lanshi	3	82	19	24	39	72	118	81			
23	Guangzhou Songri	3	74	19	21	34	57	95	78			
24	**Chengdu Blades**	2	60	18	17	25	62	76	71			
25	Shanghai United	2	54	14	19	21	50	60	61			
26	Shanxi Guoli	3	82	13	20	49	83	156	59			
27	**Jiangsu Sainty**	2	52	10	18	24	49	80	47			
28	**Nanchang Bayi**	0	0	0	0	0	0	0	0			

== League attendance ==
The attendance figures are announced by the league department of CFA. 1994–2001 Jia-A figures was corrected by Titan Sports., also on Blog.Sina.Com, the figures after 2002 was calculated from the record of the Official CFA site

Season	Total Att	Average Att	Highest Home Att By Team
1994	2,155,000	16,326	Sichuan Quanxing (40,000)
1995	3,140,280	23,790	Sichuan Quanxing (40,182)
1996	3,203,122	24,266	Shandong Luneng (42,272)
1997	2,801,100	21,220	Sichuan Quanxing (39,180)
1998	3,883,000	21,335	Shanghai Shenhua (39,713)
1999	3,623,500	19,909	Sichuan Quanxing (28,150)
2000	3,622,000	19,901	Dalian Shide (26,154)
2001	3,329,872	18,296	Shanxi Guoli (38,700)
2002	3,146,640	14,984	Beijing Guoan (32,429)
2003	3,719,700	17,710	Dalian Shide (30,500)
2004	1,430,600	10,838	Shandong Luneng (23,636)
2005	1,871,700	10,284	Shandong Luneng(26,000)
2006	2,228,300	10,611	Shandong Luneng (30,679)
2007	3,173,500	15,112	Shaanxi Chanba (24,643)
2008	3,065,280	13,444	Shandong Luneng (26,501)
2009	3,854,115	16,059	Beijing Guoan (36,805)
2010	3,499,304	14,581	Beijing Guoan (33,342)

== Awards ==
China used to have three main award series, they are:

Mr. China Football Award, started from 1994, voted by fans all over the country, to award the player of the year.

Three Golden Awards, organized by China Sports Daily, started from 1983, award the best performance players in all kinds of tournament, not only in the leagues, the awards includes:
Player of the year – Golden Ball awards
Best Scorer of the year – Golden Boot awards
Referee of the year – Golden Whistle awards

Official CFA League awards, Is the Official League awards, Awarded by CFA, includes:
Most Valuable players of the league awards (MVP)
League Top Scorer awards
Manager of the year awards
Referee of the year awards
in 1999 season, three other items added as regular awards
Youth Player of the year awards (MYP)
Club of the year awards
Fair play club of the year awards
The league oscar also involve some occasional awards

In the year 2002, the three series above was merged into the Official CFA Annual Awards. It now includes:
Mr. Football League Golden Ball awards, also called MVP awards or Mr. China Football awards by some media
Best Scorer Golden Boot awards
Ref'e'ree of the year Golden Whistle awards
Manager of the year awards
Youth player of the year awards

=== Best player awards ===
==== Most Valuable Player of the League ====
Most Valuable players of the league awards; from the 2002 edition onwards, named Mr. Football League Golden Ball awards

Year	Footballer	Club	Nationality
1994	Li Bing	Liaoning Yuandong	China
1995	Fan Zhiyi	Shanghai Shenhua	China
1996	Su Maozhen	Shandong Luneng	China
1997	Jorge Luis Campos	Beijing Guoan	Paraguay
1998	Hao Haidong	Dalian Shide	China
1999	Qu Shengqing	Liaoning Fushun	China
2000	Zhang Enhua	Dalian Shide	China
2001	Li Tie	Liaoning Fushun	China
2002	Zheng Zhi	Shenzhen Ping'an	China
2003	Jörg Albertz	Shanghai Shenhua	Germany
2004	Zhao Junzhe	Liaoning Zhongyu	China
2005	Branko Jelić	Beijing Guoan	Serbia
2006	Zheng Zhi	Shandong Luneng	China
2007	Du Zhenyu	Changchun Yatai	China
2008	Emil Martínez	Shanghai Shenhua	Honduras
2009	Samuel Caballero	Changchun Yatai	Honduras
2010	Duvier Riascos	Shanghai Shenhua	Colombia
2011	Muriqui	Guangzhou F.C.	Brazil
2012	Cristian Dănălache	Jiangsu Sainty	Romania
2013	Darío Conca	Guangzhou F.C.	Argentina
2014	Elkeson	Guangzhou F.C.	Brazil
2015	Ricardo Goulart	Guangzhou F.C.	Brazil
2016	Ricardo Goulart	Guangzhou F.C.	Brazil
2017	Eran Zahavi	Guangzhou R&F	Israel

==== Mr. China Football ====
First awarded in the year 1994. It merged with the "Most Valuable Player of the League" award of the Official CFA Annual awards in 2002.

Year	Footballer	Club	Nationality
1994	Li Bing	Liaoning Yuandong	China
1995	Fan Zhiyi	Shanghai Shenhua	China
1996	Fan Zhiyi	Shanghai Shenhua	China
1997	Hao Haidong	Dalian Shide	China
1998	Hao Haidong	Dalian Shide	China
1999	Su Maozhen	Shandong Luneng	China
2000	Yang Chen	Eintracht Frankfurt	China
2001	Li Tie	Liaoning Fushun	China

==== Golden Ball Awards ====
It first awarded in the year 1983, and in the year 2002, merged with the "Most Valuable Player of the League" award of the Official CFA Annual awards

Year	Footballer	Club	Nationality
1983	Jia Xiuquan	August 1	China
1984	Jia Xiuquan	August 1	China
1985	Wang Zhenjie	August 1	China
1986	Jia Xiuquan	August 1	China
1987	Tang Yaodong	Liaoning Dongyao	China
1988	Zhang Huikang	Shanghai	China
1989	Mai Chao	Guangzhou Baiyun	China
1990	Wu Qunli	Guangzhou Baiyun	China
1991	Gao Hongbo	Beijing Shenzhou	China
1992	Fu Yubin	Liaoning Dongyao	China
1993	Wu Qunli	Guangzhou Baiyun	China
1994	Peng Weiguo	Guangzhou Apollo	China
1995	Fan Zhiyi	Shanghai Shenhua	China
1996	Fan Zhiyi	Shanghai Shenhua	China
1997	Hao Haidong	Dalian Shide	China
1998	Hao Haidong	Dalian Shide	China
1999	Su Maozhen	Shandong Luneng	China
2000	Zhang Enhua	Dalian Shide	China
2001	Li Tie	Liaoning Fushun	China

=== Top Scorer of the League ===
It first awarded in the year 1980

Year	Footballer	Goals	Club	Nationality
1980	Huang Xiangdong; Li Shubin; Wang Qunfa	11	Chengdu Army; Liaoning; Tianjin	China; China; China
1981	Huang Junwei	25	Guangdong	China
1982	Xu Yonglai	19	Shandong	China
1983	Huang Dexing	16	Nanjing Army	China
1984	Huang Dexing; Xu Shugang	20	Nanjing Army; Beijing Army	China; China
1985	Wang Xuelong	13	Dalian Pearl	China
1986	Zhou Xuping	10	August 1	China
1987	Yang Weijian; Huo Jianting; Wang Jun	5	Shandong Taishan; Tianjin Seagul; Liaoning Dongyao	China; China; China
1988	Tang Quanshun	14	Shanghai Santana	China
1989	Gao Hongbo	6	China B	China
1990	Zhu Youhong; Shen Yi; Zuo Shufa	6	Shenzhou Shanghai; Tianjin Zhonghuan; Tianjin Zhonghuan	China; China; China
1991	Sun Wei	13	Liaoning Dongyao	China
1992	Gao Hongbo	11	Beijing Guoan	China
1993	Gao Feng	6	Beijing Guoan	China
1994	Hu Zhijun	17	Guangzhou Apollo	China
1995	Fan Zhiyi	15	Shanghai Shenhua	China
1996	Su Maozhen	13	Shandong Taishan	China
1997	Hao Haidong	14	Dalian Shide	China
1998	Hao Haidong	18	Dalian Shide	China
1999	Qu Shengqing	17	Liaoning Fushun	China
2000	Casiano Wilberto Delvalle Ruiz	15	Shandong Luneng	Paraguay
2001	Hao Haidong	16	Dalian Shide	China
2002	Li Jinyu	16	Liaoning Fushun	China
2003	Saúl Martínez; Kwame Ayew	14	Shanghai Shenhua; Shenyang Ginde	Honduras; Ghana
2004	Kwame Ayew	17	Inter Shanghai	Ghana
2005	Branko Jelić	21	Beijing Guoan	Serbia
2006	Li Jinyu	26	Shandong Luneng	China
2007	Li Jinyu	15	Shandong Luneng	China
2008	Éber Luís Cucchi	14	Tianjin Teda	Brazil
2009	Luis Alfredo Ramírez; Hernán Barcos	17	Guangzhou GPC; Shenzhen Asia Travel	Honduras; Argentina
2010	Duvier Riascos	20	Shanghai Shenhua	Colombia
2011	Muriqui	16	Guangzhou F.C.	Brazil
2012	Cristian Dănălache	23	Jiangsu Sainty	Romania
2013	Elkeson	24	Guangzhou F.C.	Brazil
2014	Elkeson	28	Guangzhou F.C.	Brazil
2015	Aloísio	22	Shandong Luneng	Brazil
2016	Ricardo Goulart	19	Guangzhou F.C.	Brazil
2017	Eran Zahavi	27	Guangzhou R&F	Israel

=== Manager of the year ===
The award does not necessarily go to the manager of the champions.

Year	Manager	Club	Standings	Nationality
1994	Zhang Honggen	Dalian Wanda	Jia-A League Champions	China
1995	Xu Genbao	Shanghai Shenhua	Jia-A League Champions	China
1996	Chi Shangbin	Dalian Wanda	Jia-A League Champions	China
1997	Chi Shangbin	Dalian Wanda	Jia-A League Champions	China
1998	Xu Genbao	Dalian Wanda	Jia-A League Champions	China
1999	Slobodan Santrač	Shandong Luneng	Jia-A League Champions; Chinese FA Cup Winners	Serbia
2000	Lee Jang-Soo	Chongqing Longxin	Chinese FA Cup winners, Jia-A League 4th place	South Korea
2001	Milorad Kosanović	Dalian Shide	Jia-A League Champions; Chinese FA Cup Winners	Serbia
2002	Zhu Guanghu	Shenzhen Ping'an	Jia-A League Runners-up	China
2003	Wu Jingui	Shanghai Shenhua	Jia-A League Champions	China
2004	Zhu Guanghu	Shenzhen Jianlibao	Chinese Super League Champions	China
2005	Vladimir Petrović Pižon	Dalian Shide	Chinese Super League Champions; Chinese FA Cup Winners	Serbia
2006	Ljubiša Tumbaković	Shandong Luneng	Chinese Super League Champions; Chinese FA Cup Winners	Serbia
2007	Gao Hongbo	Changchun Yatai	Chinese Super League Champions	China
2008	Ljubiša Tumbaković	Shandong Luneng	Chinese Super League Champions	Serbia
2009	Tang Yaodong	Henan Construction	Chinese Super League 3rd place	China
2010	Branko Ivanković	Shandong Luneng Taishan	Chinese Super League champions	Croatia
2011	Ma Lin	Liaoning Whowin	Chinese Super League third place	China
2012	Dragan Okuka	Jiangsu Sainty	Chinese Super League runners-up	Serbia
2013	Marcello Lippi	Guangzhou F.C.	Chinese Super League champions	Italy
2014	Gregorio Manzano	Beijing Guoan	Chinese Super League runners-up	Spain

=== Youth player of the year ===
Year	Footballer	Club	Nationality
1999	Zhang Xiaorui	Tianjin Teda	China
2000	Qu Bo	Qingdao Yizhong	China
2001	Zou Jie	Dalian Shide	China
2002	Xu Liang	Liaoning Fushun	China
2003	Liu Jindong	Shandong Luneng	China
2004	Chen Tao	Shenyang Ginde	China
2005	Hao Junmin	Tianjin Teda	China
2006	Wang Dalei	Shanghai Liancheng	China
2007	Hao Junmin	Tianjin Teda	China
2008	Huang Bowen	Beijing Guoan	China
2009	Deng Zhuoxiang	Jiangsu Sainty	China
2010	Zheng Zheng	Shandong Luneng Taishan	China
2011	Song Wenjie	Qingdao Jonoon	China
2012	Zhang Xizhe	Beijing Guoan	China
2013	Jin Jingdao	Shandong Luneng Taishan	China
2014	Liu Binbin	Shandong Luneng Taishan	China
2015	Vacant		

=== Team of the year ===
The Team of the Year is awarded by the Chinese Football Association, It first awarded in 1995, no award in 1998 & 2000, Voted by fans all-over China.

1995 Season '4–3–3'

Position	Footballer	Club	Nationality
GK	Ou Chuliang (1)	Guangdong Hongyuan	China
DF	Wei Qun (1)	Sichuan Quanxing	China
DF	Xu Hong (1)	Dalian Wanda	China
DF	Fan Zhiyi (1)	Shanghai Shenhua	China
DF	Li Hongjun (1)	Jilin Yanbian	China
MF	Peng Weiguo (1)	Guangzhou Apollo	China
MF	Gao Hongbo (2)	Beijing Guoan	China
MF	Cao Xiandong (1)	Beijing Guoan	China
FW	Hao Haidong (1)	August 1	China
FW	Li Bing (1)	Guangdong Hongyuan	China
FW	Gao Feng (1)	Beijing Guoan	China

1996 Season '4–4–2'

Position	Footballer	Club	Nationality
GK	Han Wenhai (1)	Dalian Wanda	China
DF	Wei Qun (2)	Sichuan Quanxing	China
DF	Xu Hong (2)	Dalian Wanda	China
DF	Zhang Enhua (1)	Dalian Wanda	China
DF	Wu Chengying (1)	Shanghai Shenhua	China
MF	Peng Weiguo (2)	Guangzhou Apollo	China
MF	Fan Zhiyi (2)	Shanghai Shenhua	China
MF	Ma Mingyu (1)	Guangdong Hongyuan	China
MF	Cao Xiandong (2)	Beijing Guoan	China
FW	Hao Haidong (2)	August 1	China
FW	Gao Feng (2)	Beijing Guoan	China

1997 Season '4–4–2'

Position	Footballer	Club	Nationality
GK	Ou Chuliang (2)	Guangdong Hongyuan	China
DF	Xie Feng (1)	Beijing Guoan	China
DF	Xu Hong (3)	Dalian Wanda	China
DF	Zhang Enhua (2)	Dalian Wanda	China
DF	Sun Jihai (1)	Dalian Wanda	China
MF	Li Ming (1)	Dalian Wanda	China
MF	Fan Zhiyi (3)	Shanghai Shenhua	China
MF	Liu Jun (1)	Shanghai Shenhua	China
MF	Ma Mingyu (2)	Sichuan Quanxing	China
FW	Hao Haidong (3)	Dalian Wanda	China
FW	Gao Feng (3)	Beijing Guoan	China

1999 Season '4–4–2'

Position	Footballer	Club	Nationality
GK	Gao Jianbin (1)	Sichuan Quanxing	China
DF	Zhang Enhua (3)	Dalian Wanda	China
DF	Li Weifeng (1)	Shenzhen Ping'an	China
DF	Xie Feng (2)	Shenzhen Ping'an	China
DF	Cheng Gang (1)	Qingdao Hainiu	China
MF	Li Tie (1)	Liaoning Fushun	China
MF	Ma Mingyu (3)	Sichuan Quanxing	China
MF	Zhang Xiaorui (1)	Tianjin Teda	China
MF	Li Xiaopeng (1)	Shandong Taishan	China
FW	Su Maozhen (1)	Shandong Taishan	China
FW	Qu Shengqing (1)	Liaoning Fushun	China

2001 Season '4–4–2'

Position	Footballer	Club	Nationality
GK	Liu Yunfei (1)	Tianjin Teda	China
DF	Li Weifeng (2)	Shenzhen Ping'an	China
DF	Sun Jihai (2)	Dalian Shide	China
DF	Wu Chengying (2)	Shanghai Shenhua	China
DF	Lula (1)	Sichuan Quanxing	Brazil
MF	Qi Hong (1)	Shanghai Shenhua	China
MF	Li Xiaopeng (2)	Shandong Luneng	China
MF	Li Tie (2)	Liaoning Fushun	China
MF	Ma Mingyu (4)	Sichuan Quanxing	China
FW	Hao Haidong (4)	Dalian Shide	China
FW	Marcos (1)	Shaanxi Guoli	Brazil

2002 Season '3–4–3'

Position	Footballer	Club	Nationality
GK	An Qi (1)	Dalian Shide	China
DF	Wu Chengying (3)	Shanghai Shenhua	China
DF	Zhang Enhua (4)	Dalian Shide	China
DF	Predrag Pazin (1)	Beijing Guoan	Bulgaria
MF	Shao Jiayi (1)	Beijing Guoan	China
MF	Zhao Junzhe (1)	Liaoning Fushun	China
MF	Zheng Zhi (1)	Shenzhen Ping'an	China
MF	Li Xiaopeng (3)	Shandong Luneng	China
FW	Casiano Delvalle (1)	Shandong Luneng	Paraguay
FW	Li Jinyu (1)	Liaoning Fushun	China
FW	Zoran Janković (1)	Dalian Shide	Bulgaria

2003 Season '4–4–2'

Position	Footballer	Club	Nationality
GK	Jiang Jin (1)	Inter Shanghai	China
DF	Adilson (1)	Dalian Shide	China
DF	Li Weifeng (3)	Shenzhen Jianlibao	China
DF	Du Wei (1)	Shanghai Shenhua	China
DF	Xu Yunlong (1)	Beijing Guoan	China
MF	Shen Si (1)	Inter Shanghai	China
MF	Zhao Junzhe (2)	Liaoning Zhongshun	China
MF	Jörg Albertz (1)	Shanghai Shenhua	Germany
MF	Zheng Zhi (2)	Shenzhen Jianlibao	China
FW	Saúl Martínez (1)	Shanghai Shenhua	Honduras
FW	Li Yi (1)	Shenzhen Jianlibao	China

Special Award 1994–2003 '4–4–2'

Position	Footballer	Club	Nationality
GK	Ou Chuliang	Guangdong Hongyuan/ Shanghai Shenhua/ Yunnan Hongta	China
DF	Wu Chengying	Shanghai Shenhua/ Inter Shanghai	China
DF	Du Wei	Shanghai Shenhua	China
DF	Fan Zhiyi	Shanghai Shenhua/Inter Shanghai	China
DF	Sun Jihai	Dalian Wanda	China
MF	Jorge Campos	Beijing Guoan	Paraguay
MF	Vaclav Nemecek	Dalian Wanda	Czech Republic
MF	Li Ming	Dalian Wanda	China
MF	Peng Weiguo	Guangzhou Apollo/Qianwei FC	China
FW	Hao Haidong	August 1/ Dalian Wanda	China
FW	Casiano Delvalle	Beijing Guoan/ Shandong Luneng	Paraguay

2004 Season '4–4–2'

Position	Footballer	Club	Nationality
GK	Li Leilei (1)	Shenzhen Jianlibao	China
DF	Jiao Zhe (1)	Shandong Luneng	China
DF	Xu Liang (1)	Liaoning Zhongyu	China
DF	Li Weifeng (4)	Shenzhen Jianlibao	China
DF	Zhang Yaokun (1)	Dalian Shide	China
MF	Zheng Zhi (3)	Shenzhen Jianlibao	China
MF	Yu Genwei (1)	Tianjin Teda	China
MF	Li Xiaopeng (4)	Shandong Luneng	China
MF	Tao Wei (1)	Beijing Guoan	China
FW	Li Jinyu (2)	Shandong Luneng	China
FW	Kwame Ayew (1)	Inter Shanghai	Ghana

2005 Season '4–4–2'

Position	Footballer	Club	Nationality
GK	Chen Dong (1)	Dalian Shide	China
DF	Sun Xiang (1)	Shanghai Shenhua	China
DF	Predrag Pazin (2)	Shandong Luneng	Bulgaria
DF	Ji Mingyi (1)	Dalian Shide	China
DF	Cao Yang (1)	Tianjin Teda	China
MF	Zheng Bin (1)	Wuhan Huanghelou	China
MF	Zoran Janković (2)	Dalian Shide	Bulgaria
MF	Zheng Zhi (4)	Shandong Luneng	China
MF	Hao Junmin (1)	Tianjin Teda	China
FW	Xie Hui (1)	Shanghai Shenhua	China
FW	Branko Jelić (1)	Beijing Guoan	Serbia

2006 Season '4–5–1'

Position	Footballer	Club	Nationality
GK	An Qi (2)	Xiamen Lanshi	China
DF	Samuel Caballero (1)	Changchun Yatai	Honduras
DF	Xu Yunlong (2)	Beijing Guoan	China
DF	Javier Martín Musa (1)	Beijing Guoan	Argentina
DF	Marko Zorić (1)	Tianjin Teda	Serbia
MF	Aleksandar Živković (1)	Shandong Luneng	Serbia
MF	Du Zhenyu (1)	Changchun Yatai	China
MF	Zheng Zhi (5)	Shandong Luneng	China
MF	Zou Yougen (1)	Xiamen Lanshi	China
MF	Wang Dong (1)	Changchun Yatai	China
FW	Li Jinyu (3)	Shandong Luneng	China

2007 Season '3–4–3'

Position	Footballer	Club	Nationality
GK	Yang Zhi (1)	Beijing Guoan	China
DF	Ivo Trenchev (1)	Henan Jianye	Bulgaria
DF	Samuel Caballero (2)	Changchun Yatai	Honduras
DF	Xu Yunlong (3)	Beijing Guoan	China
MF	Hao Junmin (2)	Tianjin Teda	China
MF	Tao Wei (2)	Beijing Guoan	China
MF	Liu Jian (1)	Qingdao Jonoon	China
MF	Aleksandar Živković (2)	Shandong Luneng	Serbia
FW	Li Jinyu (4)	Shandong Luneng	China
FW	Tiago (1)	Beijing Guoan	Brazil
FW	Du Zhenyu (2)	Changchun Yatai	China

2008 Season '4–4–2'

Position	Footballer	Club	Nationality
GK	Yang Zhi (2)	Beijing Guoan	China
DF	Cao Yang (2)	Tianjin Teda	China
DF	Alejandro Cichero (1)	Shandong Luneng	Venezuela
DF	Du Wei (2)	Shanghai Shenhua	China
DF	Xin Feng (1)	Shaanxi Baorong	China
MF	Emil Martínez (1)	Shanghai Shenhua	Honduras
MF	Du Zhenyu (3)	Changchun Yatai	China
MF	Tao Wei (3)	Beijing Guoan	China
MF	Aleksandar Živković (3)	Shandong Luneng	Serbia
FW	Johnson (1)	Shenzhen Shangqingyin	Angola
FW	Emmanuel Olisadebe (1)	Henan Jianye	Poland

2009 Season '3–4–3'

Position	Footballer	Club	Nationality
GK	Yang Zhi (3)	Beijing Guoan	China
DF	Zhao Peng (1)	Henan Jianye	China
DF	Samuel Caballero (3)	Changchun Yatai	Honduras
DF	Xu Yunlong (4)	Beijing Guoan	China
MF	James Chamanga (1)	Dalian Shide	Zambia
MF	Gabriel Melkam (1)	Changchun Yatai	Nigeria
MF	Darko Matić (1)	Beijing Guoan	Croatia
MF	Xu Liang (2)	Guangzhou Yiyao	China
FW	Qu Bo (1)	Qingdao Jonoon	China
FW	Luis Ramírez (1)	Guangzhou Yiyao	Honduras
FW	Hernán Barcos (1)	Shenzhen Red Diamonds	Argentina

2012 Season '4–4–2'

Position	Footballer	Club	Nationality
GK	Deng Xiaofei (1)	Jiangsu Sainty	China
DF	Sun Xiang (2)	Guangzhou F.C.	China
DF	Du Wei (3)	Shandong Luneng Taishan	China
DF	Dino Đulbić (1)	Guizhou Renhe	Australia
DF	Zheng Zheng (1)	Shandong Luneng Taishan	China
MF	Yu Hanchao (1)	Liaoning FC	China
MF	Zheng Zhi (6)	Guangzhou F.C.	China
MF	Darío Conca (1)	Guangzhou F.C.	Argentina
MF	Wang Yongpo (1)	Shandong Luneng Taishan	China
FW	Cristian Dănălache (1)	Jiangsu Sainty	Romania
FW	Gao Lin (1)	Guangzhou F.C.	China

2013 Season '4–4–2'

Position	Footballer	Club	Nationality
GK	Zeng Cheng (1)	Guangzhou F.C.	China
DF	Zhang Linpeng (1)	Guangzhou F.C.	China
DF	Xu Yunlong (5)	Beijing Guoan	China
DF	Kim Young-Gwon (1)	Guangzhou F.C.	South Korea
DF	Zheng Zheng (2)	Shandong Luneng Taishan	China
MF	Zheng Zhi (7)	Guangzhou F.C.	China
MF	Zhang Xizhe (1)	Beijing Guoan	China
MF	Darío Conca (2)	Guangzhou F.C.	Argentina
MF	Wang Yongpo (2)	Shandong Luneng Taishan	China
FW	Elkeson (1)	Guangzhou F.C.	Brazil
FW	Muriqui (1)	Guangzhou F.C.	Brazil

2014 Season '4–4–2'

Position	Footballer	Club	Nationality
GK	Wang Dalei (1)	Shandong Luneng Taishan	China
DF	Zhang Linpeng (2)	Guangzhou F.C.	China
DF	Xu Yunlong (6)	Beijing Guoan	China
DF	Kim Young-Gwon (2)	Guangzhou F.C.	South Korea
DF	Zheng Zheng (3)	Shandong Luneng Taishan	China
MF	Zheng Zhi (8)	Guangzhou F.C.	China
MF	Zhang Xizhe (2)	Beijing Guoan	China
MF	Giovanni Moreno (1)	Shanghai Shenhua	Colombia
MF	Davi (1)	Guangzhou R&F	Brazil
FW	Elkeson (2)	Guangzhou F.C.	Brazil
FW	Wu Lei (1)	Shanghai SIPG	China

2015 Season '4–4–2'

Position	Footballer	Club	Nationality
GK	Zeng Cheng (2)	Guangzhou F.C.	China
DF	Zhang Linpeng (3)	Guangzhou F.C.	China
DF	Kim Young-Gwon (3)	Guangzhou F.C.	South Korea
DF	Feng Xiaoting (1)	Guangzhou F.C.	China
DF	Xu Yunlong (7)	Beijing Guoan	China
MF	Zheng Zhi (9)	Guangzhou F.C.	China
MF	Darío Conca (3)	Shanghai SIPG	Argentina
MF	Huang Bowen (1)	Guangzhou F.C.	China
MF	Wu Xi (1)	Jiangsu Shuntian	China
FW	Goulart (1)	Guangzhou F.C.	Brazil
FW	Wu Lei (2)	Shanghai SIPG	China

2016 Season '4–4–2'

Position	Footballer	Club	Nationality
GK	Zeng Cheng (3)	Guangzhou F.C.	China
DF	Zhang Linpeng (4)	Guangzhou F.C.	China
DF	Kim Young-Gwon (4)	Guangzhou F.C.	South Korea
DF	Feng Xiaoting (2)	Guangzhou F.C.	China
DF	Jiang Zhipeng (1)	Guangzhou R&F	China
MF	Goulart (2)	Guangzhou F.C.	Brazil
MF	Wu Xi (2)	Jiangsu Suning	China
MF	Paulinho (1)	Guangzhou F.C.	Brazil
MF	Wu Lei (3)	Shanghai SIPG	China
FW	Demba Ba	Shanghai Shenhua (1)	Senegal
FW	Gao Lin	Guangzhou F.C. (2)	China

2017 Season '4–4–2'

Position	Footballer	Club	Nationality
GK	Yan Junling (1)	Shanghai SIPG	China
DF	Wang Shenchao (1)	Shanghai SIPG	China
DF	Huang Zhengyu (1)	Guangzhou R&F	China
DF	Feng Xiaoting (3)	Guangzhou F.C.	China
DF	Jiang Zhipeng (2)	Guangzhou R&F	China
MF	Wu Lei (4)	Shanghai SIPG	China
MF	Hao Junmin (3)	Shandong Luneng	China
MF	Eran Zahavi (1)	Guangzhou R&F	Israel
MF	Goulart (3)	Guangzhou F.C.	Brazil
FW	Gao Lin (3)	Guangzhou F.C.	China
FW	Hulk (1)	Shanghai SIPG	Brazil

== Other records ==
As of October 20, 2012

=== Individual Player ===
for top scorers, see statistics above

- Most goals in a game : 4 goals

(China) Hu Zhijun for Guangzhou Apollo vs Shanghai Shenhua (14 August 1994)
(China) Hao Haidong for Dalian Wanda vs Guangdong Hongyuan (10 December 1997)
(China) Zou Jie for Dalian Shide vs August 1 (8 July 2001)
(China) Li Bing for Sichuan Dahe vs Liaoning Bird (14 April 2002)
(Ghana) Kwame Ayew for Shaanxi Baorong vs Dalian Shide (21 October 2004)
(China) Li Jinyu for Shandong Luneng vs Liaoning FC (21 May 2006)
(Honduras) Elvis Scott for Changchun Yatai vs Shanghai Shenhua (27 May 2007)
(Brazil) Éber Luís Cucchi for Tianjin Teda vs Dalian Shide (30 November 2008)
(Nigeria) Peter Utaka for Dalian Aerbin vs Hangzhou Greentown (30 June 2013)
(Israel) Eran Zahavi for Guangzhou R&F vs Yanbian Funde (23 July 2017)

- Most career hat-tricks : 6 times

(China) Hao Haidong

- Fastest hat-trick : 10 minutes

(China) Li Jinyu for Shandong Luneng vs Liaoning FC (21 May 2006)

- Youngest player : 15 years 9 months and 26 days

(China) Ma Yiming for Shanghai Zobon vs Sichuan FC (22 May 2005)

- Youngest goalscorer : 16 years 9 months and 26 days

(China) Huang Bowen for Beijing Guoan vs Shenyang Ginde (26 May 2004)

- Fastest goal : 7 seconds

(China) Ji Xiang for Jiangsu Sainty vs Guangzhou Evergrande (20 October 2012)

- Most consecutive clean-sheets: 675 minutes

(China) Sun Gang for Shenzhen Ping'an (started on June 17, 2001, 0–2 v Liaoning Hongyun, 77' of the match; ended on October 28, 2001, 0–3 v Dalian Shide, 31' of the match)

=== Club ===
- Most League championships : 8 times
  - Dalian Shide (1994, 1996, 1997, 1998, 2000, 2001, 2002, 2005)
- Longest uninterrupted spell in Top Division: 15 years (1993–present)
  - Beijing Guoan
  - Shandong Luneng
  - Shanghai Shenhua
- Most goals scored in a season : 78 goals
  - Guangzhou F.C. (2013)
- Fewest goals scored in a season : 10 goals
  - Guangzhou Songri (1996)
- Most goals conceded in a season : 69 goals
  - Changsha Ginde (2001)
- Fewest goals conceded in a season : 13 goals
  - Shandong Luneng (1999)
- Biggest goal difference in a season : 60 goals
  - Guangzhou F.C. (2013)
- Most points in a season : 77 points
  - Guangzhou F.C. (2013)
- Fewest points in a season : 7 points
  - Shenyang Ginde (2001)
- Longest unbeaten streak : 55 matches

Dalian Shide (1995–1997) (started on September 03 1995, 1–0 v Guangzhou Apollo; ended on December 21, 1998, 2–4 v Shanghai Shenhua)

- Most wins in a season : 24 wins

Guangzhou F.C. (2013)

- Fewest wins in a season : 1 win
  - Changsha Ginde (1994)
  - Jiangsu Shuntian (1994)
- Most draws in a season : 14 draws
  - Shaanxi Baorong (2007)
- Most losses in a season : 23 losses
  - Changsha Ginde (2001)
- Fewest losses in a season : 0 losses
  - Dalian Shide (1996)
- Most goals in a game : 10 goals
  - Beijing Guoan 9–1 Shanghai Shenhua (20 July 1997)
- Record win : 9–1, 8–0
  - Beijing Guoan 9–1 Shanghai Shenhua (20 July 1997)
  - Dalian Shide 8–0 Bayi Football Team (8 July 2001)
  - Shanghai SIPG 8–0 Dalian Yifang (3 March 2018)
- Highest scoring draw: 4–4
  - Sichuan FC 4–4 Shandong Luneng (26 November 2003)
  - Liaoning Hongyun 4–4 Shanghai Shenhua (12 November 2008)
