= 1995 Chinese Jia-A League =

Chinese Jia-A League
- Season: 1995
- Champions: Shanghai Shenhua
- Relegated: Qingdao Hainiu; Liaoning
- Asian Club Championship: Shanghai Shenhua
- Matches: 132
- Goals: 337 (2.55 per match)
- Top goalscorer: Fan Zhiyi (15 goals)
- Average attendance: 23,790

The 1995 Chinese Jia-A League season, also known as Marlboro Jia-A League for sponsorship reasons, was the second season of professional association football league and the 34th top-tier overall league season held in China. Starting on April 16 and ending on November 19, the league saw Shanghai Shenhua win the championship.

== Promotion and relegation ==
Teams promoted from 1994 Chinese Jia-B League

- Qingdao Hainiu
- Tianjin Samsung

Relegated after end of 1994 Chinese Jia-A League

- Shenyang Liuyao
- Jiangsu Maint

== Overview ==
It was contested by 12 teams, and Shanghai Shenhua won the championship.

== Personnel ==
Team	Manager
August 1st	
Beijing Guoan	(China) Jin Zhiyang
Dalian Wanda	(China) Chi Shangbin
Guangdong Hongyuan	(China) He Jinlun
Guangzhou Apollo	(China) Zhang Jingtian
Jinan Taishan General	(China) Yin Tiesheng
Liaoning	(China) Li Shubin
Qingdao Hainiu	(China) Xu Yonglai
Shanghai Shenhua	(China) Xu Genbao
Sichuan Guancheng	
Tianjin Samsung	(China) Lin Xinjiang
Yanbian Hyundai	(China) Zheng Zhongxie

== Foreign players ==
As a military-owned team, August 1st were not allowed to sign any foreign players.

Club	Player 1	Player 2	Player 3	Former players
Beijing Guoan	(Brazil) Lindenor			
Dalian Wanda	(Netherlands) Ignacio Tuhuteru			
Guangdong Hongyuan	(Angola) Armando	(Cape Verde) Daniel		(England) Andy Flounders
Guangzhou Apollo				(Australia) Brad Maloney (Australia) Martin Bourke
Jinan Taishan General	(Federal Republic of Yugoslavia) Saša Petrović			
Liaoning				
Qingdao Hainiu				
Shanghai Shenhua	(Georgia (country)) Gocha Jorjoliani	(Russia) Aleksandr Zakharikov	(Russia) Vladimir Nakhratov	(Russia) Aleksandr Vasiljev
Sichuan Guancheng	(Brazil) Fabiano	(Brazil) Marcelo Marmelo	(Brazil) Valdo	
Tianjin Samsung	(Russia) Igor Gavrilin			
Yanbian Hyundai	(South Korea) Han Young-gook	(South Korea) Kim Jong-pil	(South Korea) Lee Hyun-seok	

== League standings ==
Pos	Team	Pld	W	D	L	GF	GA	GD	Pts	Qualification or relegation
1	Shanghai Shenhua	22	14	4	4	39	16	+23	46	1996–97 Asian Club Championship qualification
2	Beijing Guoan	22	12	6	4	36	20	+16	42	
3	Dalian Wanda	22	12	6	4	27	22	+5	42	
4	Guangdong Hongyuan	22	12	4	6	35	22	+13	40	
5	Guangzhou Apollo	22	7	7	8	28	27	+1	28	
6	Jinan Taishan General	22	6	9	7	27	28	−1	27	
7	Yanbian Hyundai	22	6	9	7	24	29	−5	27	
8	Tianjin Samsung	22	7	3	12	20	40	−20	24	
9	August 1st	22	5	8	9	24	23	+1	23	
10	Sichuan Guancheng	22	6	4	12	28	31	−3	22	
11	Qingdao Hainiu	22	5	7	10	20	32	−12	22	Relegated to Jia-B League
12	Liaoning	22	4	5	13	29	47	−18	17	Relegated to Jia-B League

Source: rsssf.com

== Awards ==
Player of the Year (Golden Ball Award)

- Fan Zhiyi (Shanghai Shenhua)

Top Scorer (Golden Boot Award)

- Fan Zhiyi (Shanghai Shenhua)

Manager of the Year

- Xu Genbao (Shanghai Shenhua)

CFA Team of the Year

Goalkeeper: Ou Chuliang (Guangdong Hongyuan)
Defence: Wei Qun (Sichuan Quanxing), Xu Hong (Dalian Wanda), Fan Zhiyi (Shanghai Shenhua), Li Hongjun (Jilin Yanbian)
Midfield: Peng Weiguo (Guangzhou Apollo), Gao Hongbo (Beijing Guoan), Cao Xiandong (Beijing Guoan)
Attack: Hao Haidong (August 1st), Li Bing (Guangdong Hongyuan), Gao Feng (Beijing Guoan),

== See also ==
- Chinese Jia-A League
- Chinese Super League
- Chinese Football Association Jia League
- Chinese Football Association Yi League
- Chinese FA Cup
- Chinese Football Association
- Football in China
- List of football records in China
- Chinese clubs in the AFC Champions League
