= Zhai Biao =

Chinese football manager and former player

Personal information
- Date of birth: 14 September 1968 (age 58)
- Place of birth: Beijing, China
- Height: 1.90 m (6 ft 3 in)
- Position: Midfielder

Senior career*
Years	Team	Apps	(Gls)
198?–1994	Beijing		
1995–1997	Sichuang Quanxing		

International career
1988–1992	China	3	(1)

Managerial career
- 1998–2002: Sichuang Quanxing (Assist)
- 2003–2004: China U23 (Assist)
- 2006–2008: Sichuan F.C.
- * Club domestic league appearances and goals

Zhai Biao (Chinese: 翟飚; born 14 September 1968) is a Chinese football manager and a former international midfielder. As a player he represented Beijing and Sichuang Quanxing while internationally he played for China in the 1988 Asian Cup. After retiring as a player he moved into management where he coached Sichuan F.C.

== Career statistics ==
=== International statistics ===
Year	Competition	Apps	Goal
1992	Dynasty Cup	3	1
Total		3	1
