= Wu Chengying =

Chinese footballer (born 1975)

Wu Chengying 吴承瑛
Personal information
- Date of birth: 21 April 1975 (age 51)
- Place of birth: Shanghai, China
- Height: 1.82 m (5 ft 11 1/2 in)
- Positions: Left-back; midfielder

Senior career*
Years	Team	Apps	(Gls)
1994–2002	Shanghai Shenhua	183	(17)
1998	→ Dalian Wanda (loan)	0	(0)
2003–2006	Shanghai International	76	(7)

International career
1996–2002	China PR	52	(2)
Medal record
Men's football
Representing China
AFC U-16 Championship
Bronze medal – third place	1990 UAE	Team
- * Club domestic league appearances and goals

Wu Chengying (Chinese: 吴承瑛; pinyin: Wú Chéngyīng; born 21 April 1975 in Shanghai) is a Chinese former international football player who spent the majority of his career at Shanghai Shenhua where he won the league and Chinese FA Cup before moving to Shanghai International for a then Chinese record fee of 13,000,000 RMB in 2003. Internationally he was a member of the Chinese national team where he participated in the 1996 and 2000 AFC Asian Cup as well also the 2002 FIFA World Cup.

== Playing career ==
Wu Chengying emerged with future Chinese internationals Shen Si, Xie Hui and Qi Hong form Shanghai Shenhua where he was predominantly used in the left back position. During his spell at Shanghai Shenhua the team claimed the 1995 Chinese Jia-A League title and the 1998 Chinese FA Cup. In February 1998, he was loaned to Dalian Wanda for half a month for the 1997–98 Asian Club Championship and scored a goal against Pohang Steelers. He attracted the interests of Italian side Calcio Como in January 2002 but the Serie A club failed to reach an agreement with Shanghai Shenhua. Wu Chengying instead joined Shanghai International later in 2003 for 13,000,000 RMB, which made him the highest Chinese transfer ever in Chinese football history. At Shanghai International he would see them come second in the 2003 league season and third in the following campaign. When his contract expired at the end of the 2006 league season, Wu decided to announce his retirement from playing.

== International career ==
After his performances for Shanghai Shenhua saw him win the league title he was included on the squad that went to the 1996 AFC Asian Cup and became a regular within the team. During Bora Milutinović's reign as the Chinese head coach Wu Chengying became China's first choice left back despite having an indifferent relationship with several regular players such as Ou Chuliang and Li Jinyu, who described him as extremely introverted. Despite his indifferent relationship with his teammates Wu was a regular starter for the national team playing in the 2000 AFC Asian Cup and 2002 FIFA World Cup until Bora Milutinović's reign as the Chinese national team ended.

== Career statistics ==
=== International goals ===
Scores and results list China's goal tally first.

No	Date	Venue	Opponent	Score	Result	Competition
1.	22 April 2001	Shaanxi Province Stadium, Xi'an, China	Maldives	2–0	10–1	2002 FIFA World Cup qualification
2.	27 May 2001	Gelora Bung Karno, Jakarta, Indonesia	Indonesia	2–0	2–0	2002 FIFA World Cup qualification

== Honours ==
=== Club ===
Shanghai Shenhua

- Chinese Jia-A League: 1995
- Chinese FA Cup: 1998

=== Individual ===
- Asian Goal of the Month: February 1998
