= Feng Xin =

Feng Xin may refer to:

- Lin Xin (fl. 12th century BC) or Feng Xin in some sources, king of the Shang dynasty
- Xin Feng (born 1978), Chinese footballer

== See also ==
- Fengxin County, Jiangxi, China
