= Zou Yougen =

Chinese footballer

Zou Yougen 邹侑根
Personal information
- Full name: Zou Yougen
- Date of birth: 25 February 1975 (age 51)
- Place of birth: Chengdu, China
- Height: 1.75 m (5 ft 9 in)
- Position: Midfielder

Youth career
- 1990—1993: Sichuan Youth

Senior career*
Years	Team	Apps	(Gls)
1994—2005	Sichuan Quanxing	237	(28)
2006—2007	Xiamen Bluelion	50	(15)
2008—2010	Chengdu Blades	34	(2)

International career^{‡}
1997—2005	China	1	(0)
- * Club domestic league appearances and goals as of 15:30, 27 January 2011 (UTC) ‡ National team caps and goals as of 15:30, 27 January 2011 (UTC)

Zou Yougen (Simplified Chinese: 邹侑根; born 25 February 1975) is a former Chinese international football midfielder, who represented Sichuan Quanxing, Xiamen Bluelion and Chengdu Blades where he achieved the distinction for being the first player to ever make over 300 appearances at the highest level of Chinese football as well as holding the record for the most appearances in the top flight of any professional Chinese footballer at the time.

== Club career ==
Zou Yougen grew up in Chengdu, Sichuan where he joined the Sichuan Youth team. He was drafted into the senior side during the 1994 league season. This was the first season where the entire football league became fully professional and Zou quickly adapted to the higher demands of the league where, in his debut season, he made eight appearances and scored two goals. Because of his ability to play in several midfield positions, particularly within left-midfield, he quickly moved up from a squad regular to a vital member of the team by the 1996 league season at Sichuan Quanxing. With Sichuan he stayed with them throughout their highs and lows until the club disbanded before the start of the 2006 league season.

Without a club Zou joined recently promoted club Xiamen Bluelion who still had to buy his contract for 2 million RMB. With Xiamen he experienced a resurgence in his career and went on to score 10 league goals in his first season with Xiamen. The following season he could not prevent Xiamen from being relegated and he left for another promoted side Chengdu Blades as well as returning to his hometown of Chengdu. It was at this club that Zou played in his 300th league game and achieved being the most capped player in Chinese football to play in the top flight when he played a league game against Henan Construction on November 2, 2008 in a 0-0 draw. While Zou continued to add to his record, his time playing at the top flight ended when Chengdu Blades were relegated for match-fixing before the start of 2010 league season, Zou decided to stay loyal and remained with the club. Zou would only play a small part in the team's promotion and decide to retire with team mate Yao Xia at the end of the season.

== See also ==
- List of football records in China
