= Wei Qun =

Chinese footballer and coach

Wei Qun 魏群
Personal information
- Date of birth: 10 February 1971 (age 55)
- Place of birth: Zigong, Sichuan, China
- Height: 1.80 m (5 ft 11 in)
- Position: Defender

Youth career
- 1984–1990: Sichuan
- 1991–1992: China Olympic team

Senior career*
Years	Team	Apps	(Gls)
1993–2002	Sichuan Quanxing	177	(28)
2003	→ Yunnan Hongta (loan)	11	(0)

International career
1995–1998	China	17	(1)

Managerial career
- 2008–2009: Sichuan FC
Medal record
Representing China
Men's football
AFC U-16 Championship
Bronze medal – third place	1988 Thailand	Team
- * Club domestic league appearances and goals

Wei Qun (Chinese: 魏群 born 10 February 1971 in Zigong, Sichuan) is a Chinese football coach and a former player who spent the majority of his career with Sichuan Quanxing where he was a defender while internationally he represented China in the 1996 Asian Cup.

== Playing career ==
Wei Qun would start his career playing for the various youth teams for his hometown football team Sichuan before he was called up to the Chinese U23 who happened to call themselves the Chinese Olympic team and were allowed to take part in the 1991 Chinese league campaign where they finished seventh. After an unsuccessful Olympics qualification campaign he returned to Sichuan to start his senior football career however it almost ended before it began when on May 1, 1993, he had an altercation with several men and was stabbed several times. Luckily he was able to make a full recovery and go on to establish himself as a vital member of the team, which soon saw him called up to the Chinese national team where he took part in the 1996 Asian Cup and was part of the team that saw China reach the quarter-finals.

After spending his whole career within Sichuan and nearing the end of his career the club decided to appoint him as their new part-time deputy general manager in 2002, however his perceived brash handling of several senior players negatively affected the club and he was loaned out Yunnan Hongta for the rest of the season. By the end of the 2003 league season Wei did not return to Sichuan and would instead decide to retire from football. He would eventually move into management and would join the second-tier football club Sichuan FC in October 2008.

In March 2018, Wei became the team manager and vice general manager of new established football club in Sichuan, Chengdu Better City.

== International goals ==
No.	Date	Venue	Opponent	Score	Result	Competition
1.	4 February 1996	Mong Kok Stadium, Kowloon, Hong Kong	Hong Kong	2–0	2–0	1996 AFC Asian Cup qualification
