= Zou Jie =

Chinese footballer

Zou Jie 邹捷
Personal information
- Date of birth: January 17, 1981 (age 45)
- Place of birth: Dalian, China
- Height: 1.83 m (6 ft 0 in)
- Position: Striker

Youth career
- 1996–1997: Dalian Yiteng
- 1998–1999: Dalian Wanda

Senior career*
Years	Team	Apps	(Gls)
2000–2009	Dalian Shide	139	(37)
2009	→ Shenyang Dongjin (Loan)	10	(3)
2010	Dalian Yiteng	2	(1)
2017	Hainan Boying	7	(0)

International career^{‡}
2005–2006	China	5	(0)
Medal record
Representing China
Men's football
EAFF Championship
Gold medal – first place	2005 South Korea	Team
- * Club domestic league appearances and goals as of 14 October 2017 ‡ National team caps and goals as of 5 January 2010

Zou Jie (Chinese: 邹捷; born January 17, 1981, in Dalian) is a former Chinese football player.

== Club career ==
Zou Jie began his professional football career for Dalian Shide in the 2000 league season, making two appearances. He rose to prominence in the 2001 Chinese season when he played in 20 games, scoring 8 goals, playing a vital part in the title winning team and would personally win the Young player of the year award. Establishing himself as a first-choice regular within the team, he would win several more league titles and Chinese FA Cup with Dalian, with the 2005 season being his most prolific when he scored 15 goals in 23 appearances. In the 2008 league season Dalian Shide would have an extremely unproductive season, which saw them flirt with relegation and this saw Xu Hong to come in as head coach, where he viewed Zou Jie as surplus to requirements, eventually leading to a loan deal to second-tier club Shenyang Dongjin during the 2009 league season. Zou returned to professional football in March 2017, joining China League Two club Hainan Boying.

== International career ==
Zou Jie was called up to the senior national team on June 19, 2005, in a friendly against Costa Rica in a 2–2 draw. After several further friendlies Zou Jie would play his first competitive game against Palestine in an Asian Cup qualifier on February 22, 2006, that China won 2–0. This was then followed by another Asian Cup qualifier game against Iraq where China lost 2–1 on March 1, 2006. The Chinese Head coach Zhu Guanghu would deem Zou Jie's performances as unsatisfactorily and did not recall him in any further squads.

== Honours ==
=== Club ===
Dalian Shide

- Chinese Jia-A League/Chinese Super League: 2000, 2001, 2002, 2005
- Chinese FA Cup: 2001, 2005

=== Individual ===
- CFA Young Player of the Year: 2001
