= Sichuan F.C. =

Chinese football club

Sichuan F.C. Sìchuān 四川
- Full name: Sichuan Football Club 四川足球俱乐部
- Founded: 2006; 19 years ago

Sichuan Football Club (Simplified Chinese: 四川足球俱乐部) was a professional Chinese football club under licence from the Chinese Football Association (CFA). The team is based in Chengdu, Sichuan, China.

== History ==
After Chinese Super League's team Sichuan First City disbanded, the sports department of Sichuan province decided to establish a new club. The new club, Sichuan F.C., was founded in February, 2006. After two seasons playing in China League Two, they finished up as runners-up and gained promotion to China League One. However, they relegated back after finishing at the bottom of the table in 2009 China League One.

They played their last season in 2012 China League Two, and has remained inactive since then.

== Name history ==
- 2006– Sichuan F.C. 四川

== Managerial history ==
- (China) Zhai Biao (2006–2008)
- (China) Sun Bowei (caretaker) (2008)
- (China) Xu Jianye (2009–2010)
- (China) Zhao Lei (2010)
- (China) Sun Bowei (2011–2013)

== Results ==
All-time League Rankings

As of the end of 2019 season.

Year	Div	Pld	W	D	L	GF	GA	GD	Pts	Pos.	FA Cup	Super Cup	AFC	Att./G	Stadium
2006	3	16	7	5	4	20	19	1	26	5^{1}	DNE	NH	DNQ		Sichuan University Stadium
2007	3	12	8	3	1	22	7	15	27^{1}	2	NH	NH	DNQ		Sichuan University Stadium
2008	2	24	7	8	9	27	36	−9	29	5	NH	NH	DNQ		Nanchong Sports Center
2009	2	24	4	4	16	26	60	−34	16	13	NH	NH	DNQ		Sichuan University Stadium
2010	3	16	3	8	5	12	17	−5	17	4^{1}	NH	NH	DNQ		Dujiangyan Phoenix Stadium
2011	3	20	2	4	14	12	44	−32	10	11^{1}	DNE	NH	DNQ		Sichuan University Stadium
2012	3	24	5	4	15	19	43	−24	19	10^{1}	DNE	DNQ	DNQ		Dujiangyan Phoenix Stadium

- ^1 in group stage

Key

	China top division
	China second division
	China third division
	China fourth division
W	Winners
RU	Runners-up
3	Third place
	Relegated

- Pld = Played
- W = Games won
- D = Games drawn
- L = Games lost
- F = Goals for
- A = Goals against
- Pts = Points
- Pos = Final position
- DNQ = Did not qualify
- DNE = Did not enter
- NH = Not Held
- – = Does Not Exist
- R1 = Round 1
- R2 = Round 2
- R3 = Round 3
- R4 = Round 4
- F = Final
- SF = Semi-finals
- QF = Quarter-finals
- R16 = Round of 16
- Group = Group stage
- GS2 = Second Group stage
- QR1 = First Qualifying Round
- QR2 = Second Qualifying Round
- QR3 = Third Qualifying Round
