= Li Hongjun =

Chinese footballer

Personal information
- Date of birth: 23 January 1970 (age 56)
- Place of birth: Beijing, China
- Position: Defender

Senior career*
Years	Team	Apps	(Gls)
1994–1996	Yanbian Hyundai	41	(0)
1997–2000	Beijing Guoan	74	(0)
2001	Chengdu Wuniu	18	(0)
Total		133	(0)

International career
1993–1996	China	7	(0)
- * Club domestic league appearances and goals

Li Hongjun (Chinese: 李红军) is a former Chinese footballer who played as a defender for the China national football team.

== Career statistics ==
=== Club ===
Club	Season	League			Cup		Continental		Other		Total	
Club	Season	Division	Apps	Goals	Apps	Goals	Apps	Goals	Apps	Goals	Apps	Goals
Yanbian Hyundai	1994	Jia-A	0	0	0	0	–		0	0	0	0
Yanbian Hyundai	1995	Jia-A	20	0	0	0	–		0	0	20	0
Yanbian Hyundai	1996	Jia-A	21	0	0	0	–		0	0	21	0
Yanbian Hyundai	Total		41	0	0	0	0	0	0	0	41	0
Beijing Guoan	1997	Jia-A	18	0	0	0	–		0	0	18	0
Beijing Guoan	1998	Jia-A	23	0	0	0	–		0	0	23	0
Beijing Guoan	1999	Jia-A	16	0	0	0	–		0	0	16	0
Beijing Guoan	2000	Jia-A	17	0	0	0	–		0	0	17	0
Beijing Guoan	Total		74	0	0	0	0	0	0	0	74	0
Chengdu Wuniu	2001	Jia-B	18	0	0	0	–		0	0	18	0
Career total			133	0	0	0	0	0	0	0	133	0

=== International ===
National team	Year	Apps	Goals
China	1993	1	0
China	1994	1	0
China	1995	1	0
China	1996	4	0
Total		7	0
