= Marcelo Marmelo =

Brazilian footballer

Personal information
- Full name: Marcelo Marmelo da Silva
- Date of birth: August 1, 1972 (age 54)
- Place of birth: Brazil
- Height: 1.81 m (5 ft 11 in)
- Position: Striker

Senior career*
Years	Team	Apps	(Gls)
1993–1995	Barreira		
1995–1997	Sichuan Quanxing		
1999–2003	Sichuan Quanxing		
2000	→ Guangzhou Apollo (loan)		
- * Club domestic league appearances and goals

Marcelo Marmelo da Silva (born August 1, 1972) is a Brazilian former footballer who played as a striker. He is one of the most famous player in Chinese former top league Jia A.

Marmelo scored a superb solo goal which was scored one of the greatest goal in Chinese professional league history, in a game against Shanghai Shenhua.

Marmelo is living in Chengdu after he retired. His wife is a Russian and has a son.
