= Wang Jun (footballer, born 1966) =

Chinese football coach and former player

Wang Jun 王俊
Personal information
- Date of birth: March 16, 1966 (age 60)
- Place of birth: Tianjin, China
- Height: 1.80 m (5 ft 11 in)
- Positions: Striker; midfielder

Youth career
- Tianjin Vanke

Senior career*
Years	Team	Apps	(Gls)
1986–1990	Tianjin Vanke		
1991–1998	Tianjin Teda	77	(15)

Managerial career
- 2009-2010, 2021-: Tianjin Jinmen Tiger (Assistant)
- * Club domestic league appearances and goals as of 12:00, 9 December 2010 (UTC) ‡ National team caps and goals as of 09:56, 9 December 2010 (UTC)

Wang Jun (Chinese: 王俊; pinyin: Wáng Jùn) is a Chinese football coach and former professional player. During his playing career, Jun was predominantly associated with his time playing for Tianjin Teda, who he played for from 1991 until 1998. Jun was Tianjin Teda's top scorer in the 1995 season, scoring nine league goals. After his retirement in 1998, Jun became an assistant coach of his old club Tianjin Teda.

== Honours ==
Tianjin Teda

- Jia B League: 1998
