= Fan Zhiyi =

Chinese footballer and coach (born 1969)

Fan Zhiyi 范志毅
Personal information
- Date of birth: 6 November 1969 (age 56)
- Place of birth: Shanghai, China
- Height: 1.83 m (6 ft 0 in)
- Position: Defender

Youth career
- 1987: Shanghai Shenhua
- 1988–1989: China B
- 1990–1992: China Olympic Development Team
- 1992–1993: Shanghai Shenhua

Senior career*
Years	Team	Apps	(Gls)
1994–1998	Shanghai Shenhua	99	(31)
1998–2001	Crystal Palace	88	(4)
2001–2002	Dundee	14	(2)
2002	Shanghai COSCO Huili	12	(4)
2002–2003	Cardiff City	6	(0)
2003–2004	Buler Rangers	9	(1)
2004–2005	Shanghai Zobon	30	(6)
2005–2006	Rangers (HKG)	5	(0)
Total		263	(48)

International career
1992–2002	China	106	(17)

Managerial career
- 2003–2004: Buler Rangers (assistant)
- 2004–2005: Shanghai Zobon (assistant)
- 2005–2006: Buler Rangers (assistant)
- 2006–2007: Suzhou Trips (assistant)
- 2008–2009: Shanghai East Asia (assistant)
- 2010: Shanghai East Asia
- 2016–2018: Shanghai Shenhua reserve
Medal record
Men's football
Representing China
AFC Asian Cup
Bronze medal – third place	1992 Japan	Team
Asian Games
Silver medal – second place	1994 Hiroshima	Football
Bronze medal – third place	1998 Bangkok	Football
- * Club domestic league appearances and goals

Fan Zhiyi (Chinese: 范志毅; pinyin: Fàn Zhìyì; born 6 November 1969) is a Chinese football coach and former player. He played as a defender for Shanghai Shenhua, Crystal Palace, Dundee, Shanghai COSCO Huili, Cardiff City, Buler Rangers and Shanghai Zobon.

He was considered a trailblazer in his native homeland when Sun Jihai and he became the first two Chinese footballers to play in the English leagues, joining Crystal Palace in 1998. Internationally, he would go on to play with the China national team in the 2002 FIFA World Cup. He made 106 appearances for China, scoring 17 goals. Fan was also the first player from China to be named AFC Player of the Year. He has since gone on to become a football coach and had his first stint as manager at Shanghai East Asia.

== Club career ==
Fan Zhiyi was considered a talented youngster and integrated into the China national B team which was allowed to take part in the Chinese football league system for a season. His time with them was extremely successful and he was even able to win the Chinese league title with the team in the 1989 league season before he had to return to Shanghai Shenhua. After returning to Shanghai and playing in his first season as a professional, Fan's best was brought out of him due to the improved level of play. His superb fitness and hardworking ethics as well as his excellent positional play as a central defender would see him become a regular within the team. By the 1995 league season, he had already gained a reputation as tough tackler who had superb aerial ability especially from set-piece plays, however he would also show his versatility as a player when he played in several positions including a provisional striker when he was the league's top goalscorer with fifteen goals as he guided Shanghai Shenhua towards the league title in the 1995 season. After several seasons he had now settled into central defense as a sweeper and would captain his side as they won Chinese FA Cup in 1998.

In the 1998–99 season, Fan made national headlines when he left Shanghai to join First Division side Crystal Palace where he and Sun Jihai became the first Chinese footballers in the English leagues. Fan soon established himself as an important player at Crystal Palace and was very popular with the fans and staff as well as winning the club many new fans back in China. He was also the captain of Crystal Palace for a while and scored several important goals for the club. As he played for Crystal Palace, Fan would also play in the 2000 AFC Asian Cup for the China national team before personally winning Asian Footballer of the Year in 2001. After helping China qualify for the 2002 FIFA World Cup in October 2001, Fan transferred to Scottish Premier League side Dundee for £350,000. He managed to score against Celtic in a 3–1 loss with a good long-distance shot after positioning himself well after he received a pass from Nacho Novo.

After returning from the 2002 FIFA World Cup, Fan decided not to return to Dundee and decided to return to China to join top-tier club Shanghai International for a brief period. He would soon return to the United Kingdom, where he had a trial with Gillingham; however, Fan decided to join Second Division side Cardiff City in November 2002.

In October 2003, he signed a one-year contract to become player-coach of Hong Kong First Division League side Buler Rangers. However, his stay in Hong Kong lasted only a few months when, in early 2004, he moved back to Shanghai to become the captain of China League One side Zhuhai Zobon. He led the club to promotion to the Chinese Super League one year later and the club renamed to Shanghai Zobon after it moved to Shanghai. Fan left the club after the 2005 season and joined Buler Rangers for a second stint but, after five games, he decided to end his playing career and retired.

== International career ==
Fan was a key veteran of the China national team that qualified for the 2002 FIFA World Cup, their first time qualifying for the tournament. After returning from the 2002 FIFA World Cup, Fan announced his retirement from the national team after ten years where he was an anchor in the defense and was capped 106 times for his country.

== Managerial career ==
Fan often stated that his desire was to move into management and had brief spells as an assistant coach with Buler Rangers and Shanghai Zobon while he was still playing. Once he retired from playing football, he became a technical director and assistant coach at China League Two side Suzhou Trips. Fan became manager of China League One side Shanghai East Asia in 2010, but he was sacked at the end of the 2010 season. Between 2016 and 2018, Fan worked as the manager of Shanghai Shenhua youth team.

In 2022, Fan was elected as the vice president of Shanghai Football Association.

== Career statistics ==
Scores and results list China's goal tally first, score column indicates score after each Fan goal.

List of international goals scored by Fan Zhiyi
No.	Date	Venue	Opponent	Score	Result	Competition
1	4 February 1996	Hong Kong	Hong Kong		2–0	1996 AFC Asian Cup qualification
2	21 February 1997	Kuala Lumpur, Malaysia	Singapore		3–1	1997 Dunhill Cup Malaysia
3	28 February 1997	Kuala Lumpur, Malaysia	Zimbabwe		3–1	1997 Dunhill Cup Malaysia
4	28 February 1997	Kuala Lumpur, Malaysia	Zimbabwe		3–1	1997 Dunhill Cup Malaysia
5	20 April 1997	Beijing, China	Myanmar		5–0	Friendly
6	25 May 1997	Ho Chi Minh City, Vietnam	Vietnam		3–1	1998 FIFA World Cup qualification
7	22 June 1997	Beijing, China	Vietnam		4–0	1998 FIFA World Cup qualification
8	13 September 1997	Dalian, China	Iran		2–4	1998 FIFA World Cup qualification
9	31 October 1997	Dalian, China	Qatar		2–3	1998 FIFA World Cup qualification
10	30 November 1998	Surat Thani, Thailand	Lebanon		4–1	1998 Asian Games
11	14 December 1998	Bangkok, Thailand	Turkmenistan		3–0	1998 Asian Games
12	19 December 1998	Bangkok, Thailand	Thailand		3–0	1998 Asian Games
13	13 October 2000	Tripoli, Lebanon	South Korea		2–2	2000 AFC Asian Cup
14	22 April 2001	Xi'an, China	Maldives		10–1	2002 FIFA World Cup qualification
15	22 April 2001	Xi'an, China	Maldives		10–1	2002 FIFA World Cup qualification
16	31 August 2001	Muscat, Oman	Oman		2–0	2002 FIFA World Cup qualification
17	15 September 2001	Shenyang, China	Uzbekistan		2–0	2002 FIFA World Cup qualification

== Honours ==
=== Player ===
China B

- Chinese Jia-A League: 1989

Shanghai Shenhua

- Chinese Jia-A League: 1995
- Chinese FA Cup: 1998

Individual

- Asian Footballer of the Year: 2001
- Chinese Football Association Player of the Year: 1995, 1996, 2001
- Chinese Jia-A League Team of the Year: 1995, 1996, 1997
- Chinese Jia-A League Top goalscorer: 1995
- Crystal Palace Player of the Year: 2001

== Filmography ==
=== Variety shows ===
Year	Name	Notes
2016	Running Man	episode – 283

=== Film ===
Year	English title	Chinese title	Role	Notes
2021	Never Stop	超越	Himself	

=== TV Drama ===
Year	English title	Chinese title	Role	Notes
2023	Blossoms Shanghai	繁花	Lao Fan	

== See also ==
- List of men's footballers with 100 or more international caps
