= Yunnan Hongta F.C. =

Chinese football club

Yunnan Hongta 云南红塔
- Full name: Yunnan Hongta 云南红塔
- Founded: 1996; 29 years ago
- Dissolved: 2003; 22 years ago Merged with Chongqing Lifan F.C.
- Ground: Kunming Tuodong Sports Center, Kunming, China
- Capacity: 40,000
Home colours	Away colours

Yunnan Hongta (Chinese: 云南红塔, lit. Yunnan Red Tower) was a football club who played in the Chinese Jia-A League who were founded by the Shenzhen Kinspar Group in 1996 and named Shenzhen Kinspar (Chinese: 深圳金鹏). The club predominantly played within the lower leagues until they were sold to the Yunnan Hongta Group, a tobacco producer who renamed the team Yunnan Hongta and moved the club to Kunming to play in the Tuodong Stadium. Yunnan Hongta would win promotion to the Chinese Jia-A League in the 1999 league season where they remained until Chongqing Lifan bought then merged the teams in 2003.

== History ==
=== Early club era ===
Founded as Shenzhen Kinspar (Chinese: 深圳金鹏) by the Shenzhen Kinspar Group in 1996, the club won the membership of the second division (Chinese Football Association Jia League Group B) by defeating Xiamen in the final of the third and the lowest division Chinese Football Association Yi League. In the following year, Shenzhen Kinspar lost the bid to the championship and sold the club to Yunnan Hongta Group, a tobacco producer. The team was renamed Yunnan Hongta. They played in Tuodong Stadium.

Yunnan Hongta made huge investment in the club. First, Qi Wusheng, who failed to lead China to qualify for the 1998 FIFA World Cup was introduced in 1999. Next, the club bought a lot of young players from the upper division (Group A). Under Qi Wusheng the team won the runner up position of Group B and was promoted to Group A.

In the next year, Ou Chuliang, the goalkeeper of the national team, was transferred from Shanghai Shenhua. Qi Wusheng's coaching in the national team made the team attractive to many national footballers. In 2002, another national team regular player Wei Qun followed Ou Chuliang and joined the team.

After settled down in Group A, Yunnan Hongta began to chase the championship in 2002. However, despite leading in the first half, they end up with the seventh. In the same year, they hosted Real Madrid during their offseason.

=== Merger with Chongqing Lifan F.C. ===
See also Chongqing Lifan F.C.

After ranked the seventh in the following year, the Yunnan Hongta Group lost the patience for the national title and sold the team to the relegated Chongqing Lifan. The merger ended Yunnan Hongta's hope of championship. Without the huge investment from the Yunnan Hongta Group, the new team end with the last spot in two years.

The reserve team of Yunnan Hongta was not sold, however. They formed a new club named Lijiang Dongba and had played in the China League Two for three seasons.

== Name history ==
- 1996: Shenzhen Kinspar (深圳金鹏)
- 1997-03: Yunnan Hongta (云南红塔)

== Crest history ==
1996
Shenzhen Kinspar
(深圳金鹏)

1997-
Yunnan Hongta
(云南红塔)

-2003
Yunnan Hongta
(云南红塔)

== Results ==
All-time League rankings

- As of the end of 2003 season.

Season	1996	1997	1998	1999	2000	2001	2002	2003
Division	3	2	2	2	1	1	1	1
Position	2	7	9	2	12	10	7	7

== See also ==
- Chongqing Lifan F.C.
