= Xin Feng =

Chinese footballer

Xin Feng 忻峰
Personal information
- Date of birth: 27 May 1978 (age 48)
- Place of birth: Shanghai, China
- Height: 1.83 m (6 ft 0 in)
- Position: Defender

Senior career*
Years	Team	Apps	(Gls)
1996–1997	Shanghai Pudong	0	(0)
1998–2003	Shanghai Shenhua	80	(0)
2003–2007	Shenzhen Jianlibao	101	(7)
2008–2010	Shaanxi Chanba	85	(5)
2011	Shanghai Shenhua	6	(0)
2012–2013	Wuhan Zall	37	(2)
2014–2015	Jiangxi Liansheng	27	(0)
2016–2017	Suzhou Dongwu	23	(0)

International career^{‡}
2007–2008	China	3	(0)

Managerial career
- 2016–2017: Suzhou Dongwu (assistant)
- 2018–2020: Wuhan Zall (assistant)
Medal record
Representing China
Men's football
AFC Youth Championship
Silver medal – second place	1996 َ South Korea	Team
- * Club domestic league appearances and goals as of 13 October 2017 ‡ National team caps and goals as of 16 March 2011

Xin Feng (Chinese: 忻峰; pinyin: Xīn Fēng; born 27 May 1978 in Shanghai) is a Chinese former football player as a defender.

== Club career ==
Xin Feng started his professional football career for second tier side Shanghai Pudong before he switched to top tier side Shanghai Shenhua and broke into their team during the 1998 league season when he made four league appearances in his debut season. Xin would also be included in the squad that won the 1998 Chinese FA Cup and by the following season he would start to establish himself as a regular within the team by making thirteen league appearances. After several seasons he would move to Shenzhen Jianlibao where he rose to prominence as a defender and would win the 2004 China Super League title with an unfancied Shenzhen team. During the ACL 2005 game against Suwon Samsung Bluewings he would achieve his personal highlight when he scored with a fierce close shot from a cross to seal Shenzhen's place in the quarter-finals. After five seasons with Shenzhen he would transfer back to his first team Shanghai Pudong, who had moved to Xi'an, Shaanxi and renamed themselves Shaanxi Chanba). For the next several seasons he would go on to be a vital member of the team, however nearing the end of his career the club would allow Xin to leave for free to Shanghai Shenhua.

== International career ==
Xin Feng would have to wait until February 7, 2007 before he made his international debut against Kazakhstan in a 2-1 victory in preparation for the 2007 AFC Asian Cup. Unable to make the squad he was given another chance to prove himself by the new Chinese Head coach Vladimir Petrović in a friendly against Mexico in a 1-0 defeat on April 16, 2008. Unable to recapture his club form for his country, Xin would only play once more for the senior team.

== End of football career ==
On 29 January 2026, Xing was given a lifetime ban for match-fixing by the Chinese Football Association.

== Honours ==
Shanghai Shenhua

- Chinese FA Cup: 1998

Shenzhen Shangqingyin

- Chinese Super League: 2004

Jiangxi Liansheng

- China League Two: 2014
