= Ou Chuliang =

Chinese footballer and coach

Ou Chuliang 区楚良
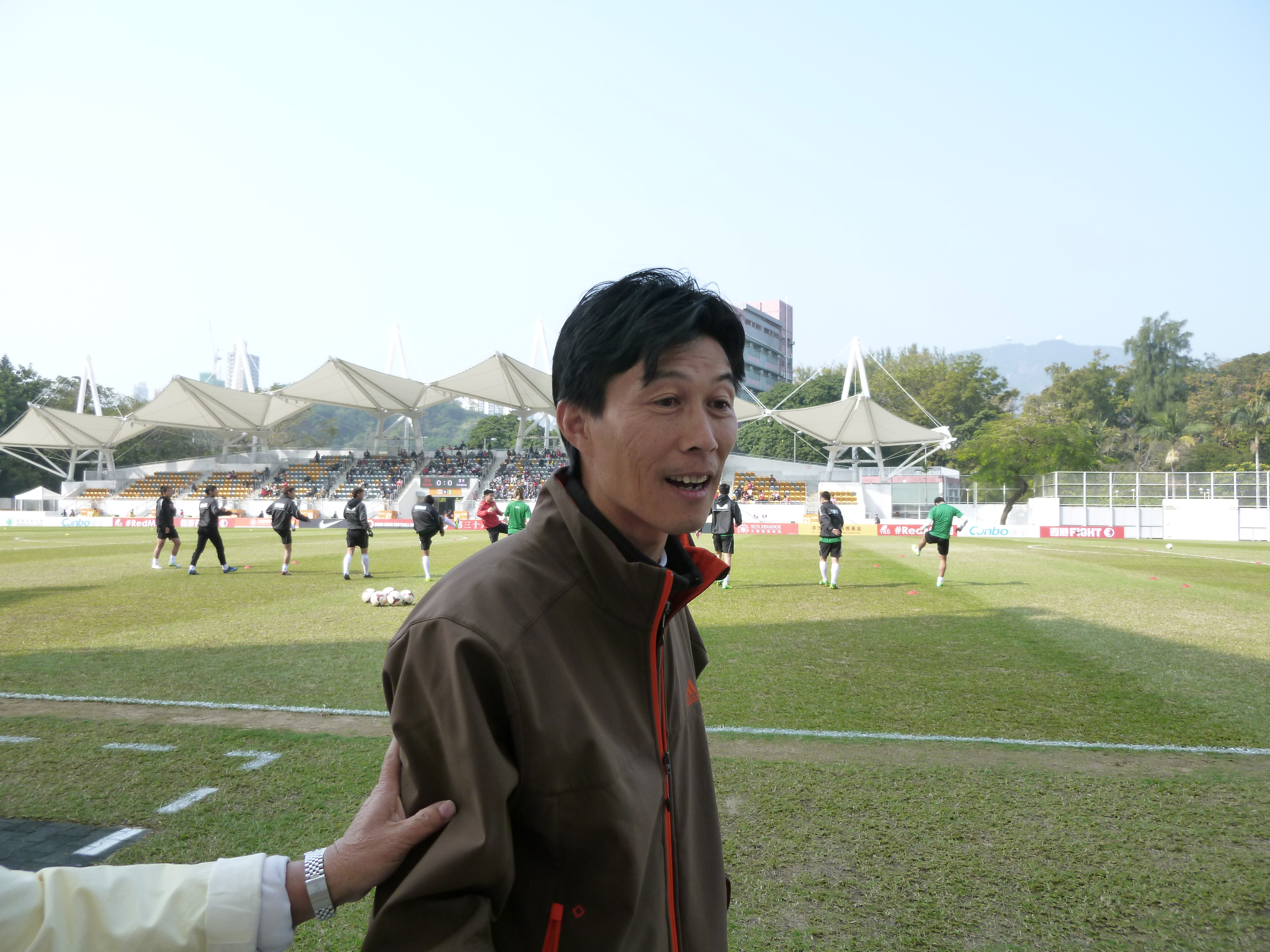
- Ou at Mong Kok Stadium in 2013

Personal information
- Full name: Ou Chuliang
- Date of birth: 26 August 1968 (age 58)
- Place of birth: Guangzhou, Guangdong, China
- Height: 1.80 m (5 ft 11 in)
- Position: Goalkeeper

Youth career
- Guangdong Youth

Senior career*
Years	Team	Apps	(Gls)
1988–1997	Guangdong Hongyuan	63	(0)
1998–1999	Shanghai Shenhua	45	(0)
2000–2003	Yunnan Hongta	102	(0)
2004	Chongqing Qiche	1	(0)
Total		211	(0)

International career
1992–2002	China	75	(0)

Managerial career
- 2005: China U-23 (assistant)
- 2006–2008: Shanghai Shenhua (assistant)
- 2008–2016: China (goalkeeping)
- 2012: Henan Jianye (goalkeeping)
- 2020–2022: China (goalkeeping)
- 2022: China Women (assistant)
Medal record
Men's football
Representing China
AFC Asian Cup
Bronze medal – third place	1992 Japan	Team
Asian Games
Silver medal – second place	1994 Hiroshima	Football
- * Club domestic league appearances and goals

Ou Chuliang (simplified Chinese: 区楚良; traditional Chinese: 區楚良; pinyin: Oū Chǔliáng; Jyutping: Au1 Cho2 Leung4; born 26 August 1968 in Guangzhou, Guangdong) is an assistant coach and former Chinese international football goalkeeper. As a player, he was goalkeeper for Guangdong Hongyuan, Shanghai Shenhua, Yunnan Hongta and Chongqing Qiche while internationally he was a participant of the Chinese football team that took part in the 2002 FIFA World Cup.

== Club career ==
Ou started his football career with Guangdong Hongyuan F.C. during the 1988 football league season. With them Ou would see Guangdong establish themselves as a professional football club in the Chinese league system and also help them come second in the 1993 league season. Guangdong, however were relegated in the 1997 league season and Ou Chuliang was transferred to Shanghai Shenhua at the beginning of the 1998 league season. With Shanghai Ou Chuliang would make an immediate impact by helping them come second within the league as well as aiding them in their Chinese FA Cup win. Yunnan Hongta who were a newly promoted football team wanted to take Ou Chuliang in their attempt to establish themselves within the top tier and Ou would help them do this by quickly establish himself in the team by playing in 26 league games and aiding Yunnan Hongta avoid relegation. Qu would spend several more seasons with Yunnan before being transferred to Chongqing Lifan F.C. in 2004 eventually ending his career with them.

== International career ==
Ou made his international debut in a friendly match against Canada on 2 April 1992 in a 5–2 defeat. Despite the defeat, Ou would be given the chance to play in several other friendlies which were enough to be called up to the Chinese squad that took part in the 1992 AFC Asian Cup where he played understudy to Fu Yubin. Ou would rise to prominence when he replaced Fu Yubin as the first choice goalkeeper for China in the 1996 AFC Asian Cup by starting the first game of the tournament against Uzbekistan. After a disappointing 1998 World Cup qualifying performance, Ou found himself increasingly replaced by Jiang Jin leading up to the 2000 AFC Asian Cup. Jiang eventually cemented his position at the 2002 FIFA World Cup.

== Management career ==
After he retired he would move to the United Kingdom and Germany to study for and achieve a FIFA coaching licence. When he returned in 2005 he was offered an assistant goalkeeping position for the Chinese U-23 football team to help them prepare for the Football at the 2008 Summer Olympics. Ou would only stay for a short period before he returned to Shanghai Shenhua to become their goalkeeping coach. By 2008 he was offered another assistant position, this time with the Chinese senior team as their new goalkeeping coach.

== Personal life ==
Ou Chuliang's grandfather Ou Shounian (Chinese: 区寿年) was a general of the National Revolutionary Army of the Republic of China.

== Honours ==
=== Player ===
Shanghai Shenhua

- Chinese FA Cup: 1998
