= Xu Hong =

Chinese footballer and manager

Xu Hong 徐弘
Personal information
- Full name: Xu Hong
- Date of birth: May 14, 1968 (age 58)
- Place of birth: Dalian, Liaoning, China
- Height: 1.83 m (6 ft 0 in)
- Position: Defender

Senior career*
Years	Team	Apps	(Gls)
1992–1993	Team Liaoning		
1994–2000	Dalian Wanda	142	(6)

International career
1992–1998	China	35	(2)

Managerial career
- 2001–2002: Dalian Sidelong
- 2003–2004: Sichuan Guancheng
- 2006: Chongqing Lifan
- 2008–2010: Dalian Shide
- 2013: Dalian Aerbin
Medal record
Men's football
Representing China
AFC Asian Cup
Bronze medal – third place	1992 Japan	Team
Asian Games
Silver medal – second place	1994 Hiroshima	Football
- * Club domestic league appearances and goals

Xu Hong (Chinese: 徐弘; pinyin: Xú Hóng; born May 14, 1968, in Dalian) is a retired Chinese football player and football manager. He was most recently the manager of Chinese Super League team Dalian Aerbin F.C. for 63 days before he had to resign on February 19, 2013, because it was discovered by the Chinese Football Association that he manipulated a match while as a manager at Sichuan Guancheng and was given a 5-year suspension from all football activity.

== Playing career ==
Xu Hong rose to prominence in the 1994 league season with Dalian Wanda FC, when they won the first professional Chinese Jia-A League title. With Dalian, he would win several more top-tier league titles in his career in a dominant Dalian team. As one of the most consistent members of the Dalian team he was also named in several senior Chinese national teams, captaining his country against England in 1996.

== Management career ==
After he retired, Xu Hong began managing the newly formed Chinese team Dalian Sidelong in the third tier. He quickly managed to get them immediately promoted to the second tier in 2002 and was able to take Dalian Sidelong second in the league. However the Chinese Football Association, in there attempt to improve the league system did not allow any promotion or relegation in this season and Dalian Sidelong remained in the same league.

Xu Hong caught the attention of top-tier team Sichuan Guancheng in the 2003 league season where he took them eighth and then ninth the following season in the league. These unremarkable performances saw Xu Hong leave at the end of the 2004 league season. He would not work in management until the 2006 league season with consistent relegation contenders Chongqing Lifan F.C., however despite his best efforts his reign at Chongqing was extremely disappointing and they were relegated at the end of the season, which saw the immediate departure of Xu Hong.

Despite being out of management for two seasons Xu Hong's ties were strong enough for him to be given the assistant post at Dalian Shide F.C. in 2008 to Milorad Kosanović. However Milorad Kosanović left as Head Coach after a very disappointing season which saw them fight against relegation. Xu Hong was brought in as a temporary Head Coach, yet impressed many at the end of the season with his coaching skills and was offered a permanent position. His resignation was accepted after a 1–2 home loss against Tianjin Teda on May 15, 2010.

== Match fixing ==
On February 19, 2013, Xu was given a 5-year suspension from all football activity after it was discovered by the Chinese Football Association that he manipulated a match while he was manager of Sichuan Guancheng. The match in question was the league game between Sichuan Guancheng against Shaanxi Guoli F.C. on September 21, 2003, in a game that Sichuan actually won 5–1. The Chinese FA claim that the General manager of Shaanxi Guoli, Wang Po told Xu to manipulate the game, however Xu has gone on to proclaim his innocence by pointing out that his team actually won the game and that he never received a penny from Wang Po who has already received a life-ban from football.

== Honours ==
=== Player ===
- Chinese Jia-A League: 1994, 1996, 1997, 1998, 2000

=== Manager ===
- China League Two: 2001
