= Sichuan First City F.C. =

Chinese football club

Sichuan First City
- Full name: Sichuan First City Football Club
- Founded: 1953; 72 years ago (Semi Pro); 1993 (Professional)
- Dissolved: 2006; 19 years ago
- Ground: Chengdu Sports Centre, Chengdu, China
- League: Chinese Super League
- 2005: 9th
Home colours	Away colours

Sichuan First City (Chinese: 四川冠城) is a defunct Chinese football club, which was located in Chengdu, Sichuan where they played in the Chengdu Sports Centre. They were founded in 1953 and spent a large part of their history within the top tier of Chinese football until on November 8, 1993, they became a fully professional unit and took part in China's inaugural season of professional football in the 1994 Chinese Jia-A League season. After being the flagship of western Chinese football the club was sold to the Dahe Group in 2002, however the new owners were found to be under the influence of another Chinese football team Dalian Shide. Despite the sale of the club to the First City Group in 2003, an investigation by the Chinese Football Association found them to still be breaking competition rules, and on January 27, 2006, the club were unable to sell the club's remaining Dalian Shide's shares to the Sichuan Football Association and were forced to disband.

== History ==
Formed as Sichuan Quanxing (四川全兴) on 8 November 1993, the football club was the football flagship of western China until Qianwei Huandao (now Chongqing Lifan) surfaced. In 2002, Sichuan Quanxing was sold to Dahe Group and was renamed Sichuan Dahe.

However, the Dahe Group was found under the influence of Dalian Shide. Under the criticism of unfair competition, the team was sold again to the First City Group, renamed Sichuan First City and finished 9th in the 2004 and 2005 seasons. The sale had not removed the doubt of Dalian Shide influence, however. After an investigation by Chinese Football Association, the club was ordered to remove any relationship with Dalian Shide. The club disbanded on January 27, 2006, because the owner Dalian Shide could not make a deal with the Sichuan Football Association in time.

== Name history ==
- 1953–1993: Sichuan 四川
- 1994–2001: Sichuan Quanxing F.C. 四川全兴
- 2002: Sichuan Dahe F.C. 四川大河
- 2003–2005: Sichuan First City F.C. 四川冠城

== Crest history ==
Sichuan Quanxing logo

Sichuan Dahe logo

Sichuan First City logo

== Managerial history ==
Managers who coached the club and team since Sichuan First City became a professional club in 1993.

- (Croatia) Milos Hrstic (1998)
- (China) Chi Shangbin (1998)
- (Brazil) Edson Tavares (1999)
- (Croatia) Milos Hrstic (2000)
- (England) Bob Houghton (2001)
- (China) Xu Hong (2003–2004)
- (China) Gao Huichen (2004–2005)

== Results ==
All-time league rankings

Season	1960	1961	1962	1963	1964	1965	1973	1974	1976	1977	1978	1979	1980	1981	1982	1983	1984	1986	1987	1988	1989	1990	1991	1992	1993
Division	1	1	1	1	2	2	1	1	1	1	2	1	2	1	1	1	1	2	2	1	3	3	2	2	2
Position	13	9	15	24	4	9	18	9	6^{1}	23	2	14	4	10	10	5^{2}	8	3	9	19	7	2	8	4	5

Season	1994	1995	1996	1997	1998	1999	2000	2001	2002	2003	2004	2005
Division	1	1	1	1	1	1	1	1	1	1	1	1
Position	6	10	6	7	5	3	3	4	14	8	9	9

- No league games in 1959, 1966–72, 1975; Sichuan did not compete in 1985.
- ^1 : In the group stage.
- ^2 : in the southern league.
