= Beijing Guoan 9–1 Shanghai Shenhua =

1997 Chinese association football match

Beijing Guoan vs Shanghai Shenhua
- Event: 1997 Chinese Jia-A League
Beijing Guoan	Shanghai Shenhua
9	1
- Date: 20 July 1997
- Venue: Workers' Stadium, Beijing
- Referee: Li Yingming
- Attendance: 38,000

A 1997 Chinese Jia-A League round 10 fixture was contested at the old Workers' Stadium in Beijing between hosts Beijing Guoan and visitors Shanghai Shenhua on 20 July 1997. Beijing Guoan and Shanghai Shenhua were both established teams in the Chinese Jia-A League, who regularly occupied high league positions in the years before. The match was the first meeting between the two sides in the calendar year, with both teams going through their respective challenges. Beijing Guoan suffered a heavy 5–1 defeat to Dalian Wanda only one week prior, and set a gargantuan task for Guoan manager Jin Zhiyang to reinstate a positive morale going forward. Shanghai Shenhua, who recently parted ways with manager Yordan Stoykov, appointed Andrzej Strejlau to face Beijing Guoan in his first game in charge.

Shanghai Shenhua started the game on the front foot while Beijing Guoan sat back to counter-attack. The first two goals broke through for Beijing Guoan in quick succession for Andrés Olivas and Cao Xiandong. Shenhua scored a goal to half the deficit before the half-hour mark, however, Casiano Delvalle and Jorge Campos collectively scored three more times, finishing the first half at 5–1. In the second half, Guoan scored four more goals increasing the scoreline to 9–1, with Delvalle and Olivas completing their individual hat-tricks.

The match remains the record for the largest victory in the history of the Chinese top-flight (in the Chinese Jia-A League era as well as the Chinese Super League era), (Note: Record equalled by Shanghai SIPG 8–0 Dalian Yifang (2018) and Shandong Taishan 8–0 Shenzhen (2022).) and further heated the rivalry between the two sides, which compete in the Jing–Hu rivalry.

== Background ==
After the first three matchweeks of the 1997 Chinese Jia-A League, a mostly domestic Beijing Guoan squad, to their standards, performed mediocre at best. As a result, in April 1997, Guoan manager Jin Zhiyang brought in Paraguayan midfielder Jorge Campos and Kenyan international William Inganga to strengthen their squad. Inganga scored on his Guoan debut, making him the first foreign-born goalscorer for the club. This made Guoan realise the value that foreign players could bring to the team, and subsequently brought in Spanish forward Andrés Olivas and Paraguayan striker Casiano Delvalle, who replaced Inganga. Beijing Guoan also suffered a 5–1 away defeat to Dalian Wanda on 13 July, a week before the Shanghai Shenhua match, and entered a state of turmoil. The task fell on the shoulders of Jin Zhiyang to instantly change the morale within the team.

Originally appointing Yordan Stoykov as manager at the start of the season following Xu Genbao's resignation in hopes to bring in foreign influences at the club, Shanghai Shenhua replaced Stoykov with Andrzej Strejlau after a series of disappointing draws. This meant that Strejlau's first game in charge would be against Beijing Guoan, Shenhua's fiercest rival, whom they form the Jing–Hu rivalry with. The Shanghai Shenhua squad, which on paper was a stronger side than that of Beijing Guoan, had a generation of Chinese international footballers in Fan Zhiyi, Wu Chengying, Xie Hui, and Qi Hong.

== Match ==
=== Summary ===
The match took place on 20 July 1997 with kick-off at 19:00. Beijing Guoan fielded a 4-4-2 formation with Fu Bin in goal. Xie Zhaoyang, Li Hongjun, Lü Jun, and Wang Shaolei lined up in defence. Further up the pitch, captain Cao Xiandong was among the four midfielders who provided support for the two men up front: Andrés Olivas and Casiano Delvalle. Delvalle would make his Guoan debut in this match, forming a strike partnership with Andrés Olivas and with his Paraguayan compatriot Jorge Campos supporting behind them in midfield – the first time the three have played together. Shanghai Shenhua, on the other hand, played a 5-4-1 formation with Russian goalkeeper Valeri Kleymyonov between the sticks. Team captain Fan Zhiyi led the back line as manager Andrzej Strejlau played Xie Hui as the sole attacker; on the bench for Shenhua were the Paraguayan duo Adolfo Fatecha and Edgar Denis.

Starting the match, Beijing Guoan sat back to counter-attack, and as a result, Shanghai Shenhua gained the majority of the ball. In the third minute, a chance broke for Shenhua as Shen Si's free-kick connected with Fan Zhiyi, who could not keep the shot under the crossbar. The chances presented itself for Shenhua again, as Liu Jun had a prime opportunity to send Shenhua 1–0 up in the fourth minute, but Guoan defender Xie Zhaoyang eventually chased back to clear the ball away. Against the run of play, it was Guoan who opened the scoring; Cao Xiandong's cross from the right flank connected with the head of Olivas, who nodded the ball in. Shenhua players, who believed that Olivas was offside as he got on the receiving end of the cross, showed dissent to the referee. Guoan manager Jin Zhiyang noticed this shift in attitude, and urged his players to counter-attack more effectively. In the 20th minute, Cao Xiandong's shot, after being deflected by several Shenhua players on the way, squeezed past the fingertips of Kleymyonov and into the goal, giving Guoan a 2–0 lead.

Four minutes after the restart, Shenhua played out a short corner to Wu Chengying at the edge of the penalty area, who blasted the ball past a sea of Guoan defenders and Fu Bin, halving Shenhua's deficit to a single goal. Guoan nearly had a third goal by the 30th minute, however, Olivas' header was saved by Kleymyonov. Guoan's third goal came two minutes later, as a free Delvalle inside the six-yard box headed the ball past Kleymyonov, restoring Guoan's two-goal advantage. Shenhua immediately had a chance to score a second; Qi Hong's shot on the rebound was inches wide of the post. Three minutes later, Cheng Yaodong brought down a charging Delvalle inside Shenhua's own penalty ara, and Li Yingming, the referee, penalised Cheng Yaodong as he pointed to the spot. Jorge Campos slotted the ball into the top left corner, increasing the advantage to three goals. Just before half-time, Fu Bin's distribution found Campos in space, and Campos charged forward to pull off a solo goal, which according to Jin Zhiyang, was the best goal of the match. At half-time, Guoan lead Shenhua by 5 goals to 1, the reverse of Guoan's last result against Dalian Wanda in Dalian.

After the break, Adolfo Fatecha and Edgar Denis came on to replace Qi Hong and Xie Hui, but it seemed like the Shenhua team had lost their spirit to fight. In the 58th minute, a Shenhua teammate found Fan Zhiyi through on goal, but his shot was well-blocked by Fu Bin. Four minutes later, a Zhou Ning through ball found Delvalle, who claimed his second goal of the match. In the 67th minutes, merely five minutes after the sixth goal, a high-cross from the left side found Olivas, whose header looped past the goalkeeper, getting his second goal of the match. In the 75th minute, a cross went through a Guoan player dragging out the lone goalkeeper, before Olivas' tap-in from point-blank range completed his hat-trick and gave Guoan an 8–1 lead. Five minutes later, a Delvalle low shot from the edge of the penalty arc went through the fatigued bodies of a set of Shenhua players and past the goalkeeper, completing his personal hat-trick. Guoan substitute Liu Jianjun received a second yellow card for a mistimed slide tackle and was sent off with two minutes and stoppage time still to go. Despite playing with 10-men for the remainder of the match, Guoan kept the scoreline at 9–1 until the final whistle. A total of eight yellow cards and one red card were dished out.

=== Details ===
20 July 1997
19:00 CST

Beijing Guoan	9–1	Shanghai Shenhua
Olivas 16', 67', 75'; Cao Xiandong 20'; Delvalle 32', 62', 80'; Campos 37' (pen.), 45'; Liu Jianjun (yellow card) (yellow-red card) 88'	Report	Wu Chengying 24'

Workers' Stadium, Beijing
Attendance: 38,000
Referee: Li Yingming

Beijing Guoan	Shanghai Shenhua

GK	1	(China) Fu Bin
DF	18	(China) Wang Shaolei
DF	13	(China) Lü Jun	(substituted off) 58'
DF	5	(China) Li Hongjun
DF	3	(China) Xie Zhaoyang
MF	14	(China) Zhou Ning
MF	12	(China) Hu Jianping
MF	8	(China) Cao Xiandong (c)	(substituted off) 79'
MF	11	(Paraguay) Jorge Campos
FW	23	(Spain) Andrés Olivas
FW	24	(Paraguay) Casiano Delvalle	(substituted off) 82'
Substitutes:
GK	22	(China) Yao Jian
DF	2	(China) Liu Jianjun	(substituted on) 58'
MF	15	(China) Deng Lejun
MF	16	(China) Li Hongzheng	(substituted on) 79'
FW	7	(China) Xie Feng	(substituted on) 82'
FW	9	(China) Wang Tao
FW	10	(China) Yang Chen
Manager:
(China) Jin Zhiyang

GK	30	(Russia) Valeri Kleymyonov
DF	15	(China) Wu Bing
DF	13	(China) Mao Yijun
DF	3	(China) Cheng Yaodong
DF	5	(China) Fan Zhiyi (c)
DF	4	(China) Wu Chengying
MF	18	(China) Zhu Qi
MF	10	(China) Liu Jun
MF	14	(China) Shen Si
MF	9	(China) Qi Hong	(substituted off) 46'
FW	20	(China) Xie Hui	(substituted off) 46'
Substitutes:
GK	1	(China) Cai Jianlin
DF	2	(China) Yao Jun
DF	19	(China) Li Chengming
MF	23	(Paraguay) Adolfo Fatecha	(substituted on) 46'
FW	6	(Paraguay) Edgar Denis	(substituted on) 46'
FW	8	(China) Zhang Yong
FW	17	(China) Zhang Yi
Manager:
(Poland) Andrzej Strejlau

Assistant referees:
Liu Yutao
Li Bing

Match rules

- 90 minutes, no extra time or penalties.
- Three points awarded to winner, none to loser.
- One point awarded to each in the event of a draw.
- Seven named substitutes.
- Maximum of three substitutions.

== Aftermath ==
The match went down in Chinese football history as the largest ever victory in the Chinese top-flight, a record that has yet to be broken as of the end of the 2025 season, and further escalated the Jing–Hu rivalry in the years that followed. After the game, the trio of Jorge Campos, Casiano Delvalle, and Andrés Olivas were dubbed by media as the "three foreign guns" (Chinese: 三杆洋枪), citing their collective menace in the front lines.

In the return league fixture on 18 December, Shenhua beat Guoan 2–1, and Shenhua finished in a higher league position than Beijing Guoan, placed in second and third respectively. However, Beijing Guoan defeated Shanghai Shenhua in the 1997 Chinese FA Cup final at the Workers' Stadium, winning the club's second consecutive Chinese FA Cup title with a controversial Guoan winner, one which Shenhua manager Strejlau claimed to be offside.

== In popular culture ==
In the 1997 Chinese film The Dream Factory, this football match was mentioned as part of a scene which involved actor Li Qi discussing contemporary news with Feng Xiaogang and He Bing.
