= Jing–Hu rivalry =

Football rivalry in China

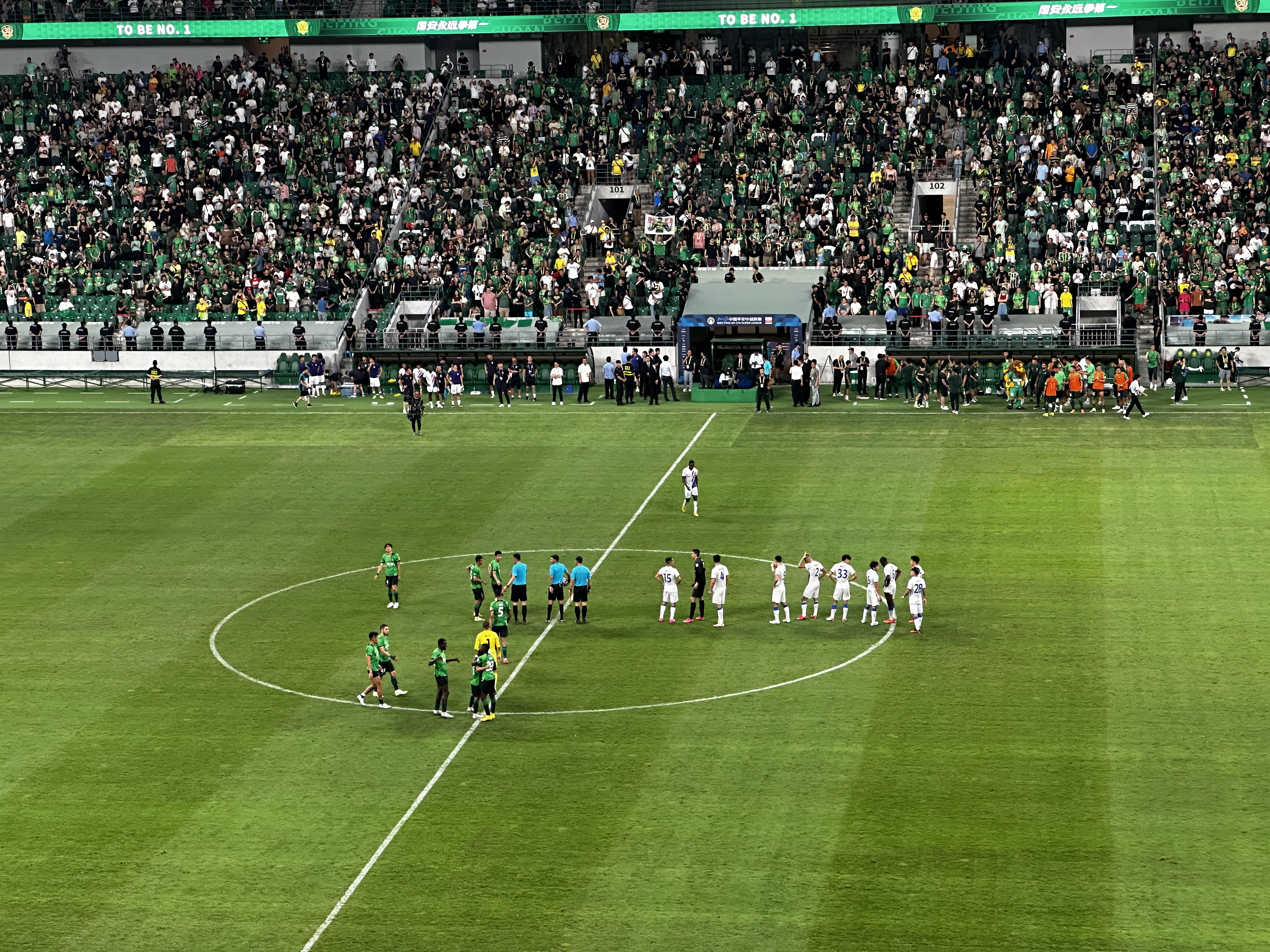
- Beijing Guoan and Shanghai Shenhua players in 2023
- Other names: National Derby; Jing–Hu derby Beijing–Shanghai derby
- Location: China
- Teams: Beijing Guoan; Shanghai Shenhua
- First meeting: 14 April 1994; 4–3 win for Shanghai Shenhua
- Latest meeting: Shanghai Shenhua 0–3 Beijing Guoan; 2026 Chinese Super League (18 August 2026)
- Stadiums: Workers' Stadium (Beijing Guoan); Shanghai Stadium (Shanghai Shenhua)

Statistics
- Total meetings: 70
- Most wins: Beijing Guoan (30)
- Top scorer: Zhang Xizhe (7 goals)
- All-time series: Beijing Guoan: 30; Drawn: 17; Shanghai Shenhua: 23
- Largest victory: 9–1 win for Beijing Guoan (20 July 1997)

The Jing–Hu rivalry is a football rivalry between Chinese clubs Beijing Guoan and Shanghai Shenhua. It takes place twice a year in the Chinese Super League, and occasionally in the Chinese FA Cup. Both clubs were founding members of the former Jia-A League and the Chinese Super League, and have participated in every edition of China's top-tier professional football league, resulting in the "eternality" of the rivalry.

Beijing Guoan leads in head-to-head results in official competitive matches with 30 wins to Shanghai Shenhua's 23, with 17 draws as of the match played on 18 August 2026.

== History ==
For most of the history of Chinese football, it was difficult for teams to establish deep connections with residents of the cities they are based in. From the 1950s to 1990s, the Danwei system of employment, which was the source of employment and material support for the majority of urban residents, restricted people’s interaction with broader social organizations. In the same period, domestic games were not played on a regular home-and-away basis but took place only in major cities, resulting in difficulties for fans to access stadiums and games. It was not until the emergence of the professional Chinese league in the 1990s that the national broadcaster, China Central Television, started to broadcast games publicly, further preventing the build-up of club identity in the early days of Chinese football.

Beijing Guoan and Shanghai Shenhua would prove to be different than most Chinese clubs. People in both cities initially engaged with football as early as the 1890s, when the YMCA introduced the game to China’s largest cities at the time. The various precursors of the two clubs were involved in national tournaments in the newly established People’s Republic of China beginning in the 1950s. When the Jia-A League, the first professional Chinese football league, was established in 1994, both Guoan and Shenhua, having been organized in 1992 and 1993 respectively, were founding members. Neither club moved cities or suffered relegation in the years since, creating strong foundations for local support and a rich competitive history.

When professionalisation first occurred, most fans' connections to their respective clubs were casual as they watched the games for entertainment. However, as time progressed, supporters of both clubs developed a deep connection with their teams, and the teams became firmly established locally. Guoan became the team for Beijing, and Shenhua became the team for Shanghai. Shanghai Port, another Shanghai team that plays in the Chinese Super League, is not afforded the same status by locals as it was established only in 2005 and is perceived to lack a strong identity and connection with the city. In 2014, when Shenhua’s then owner, the Greenland Group, attempted to change the club’s name, six major Shenhua supporters’ organizations protested the change and forced the name “Shenhua” to remain, showcasing the strong connection between the club, its fans, and Shanghai.

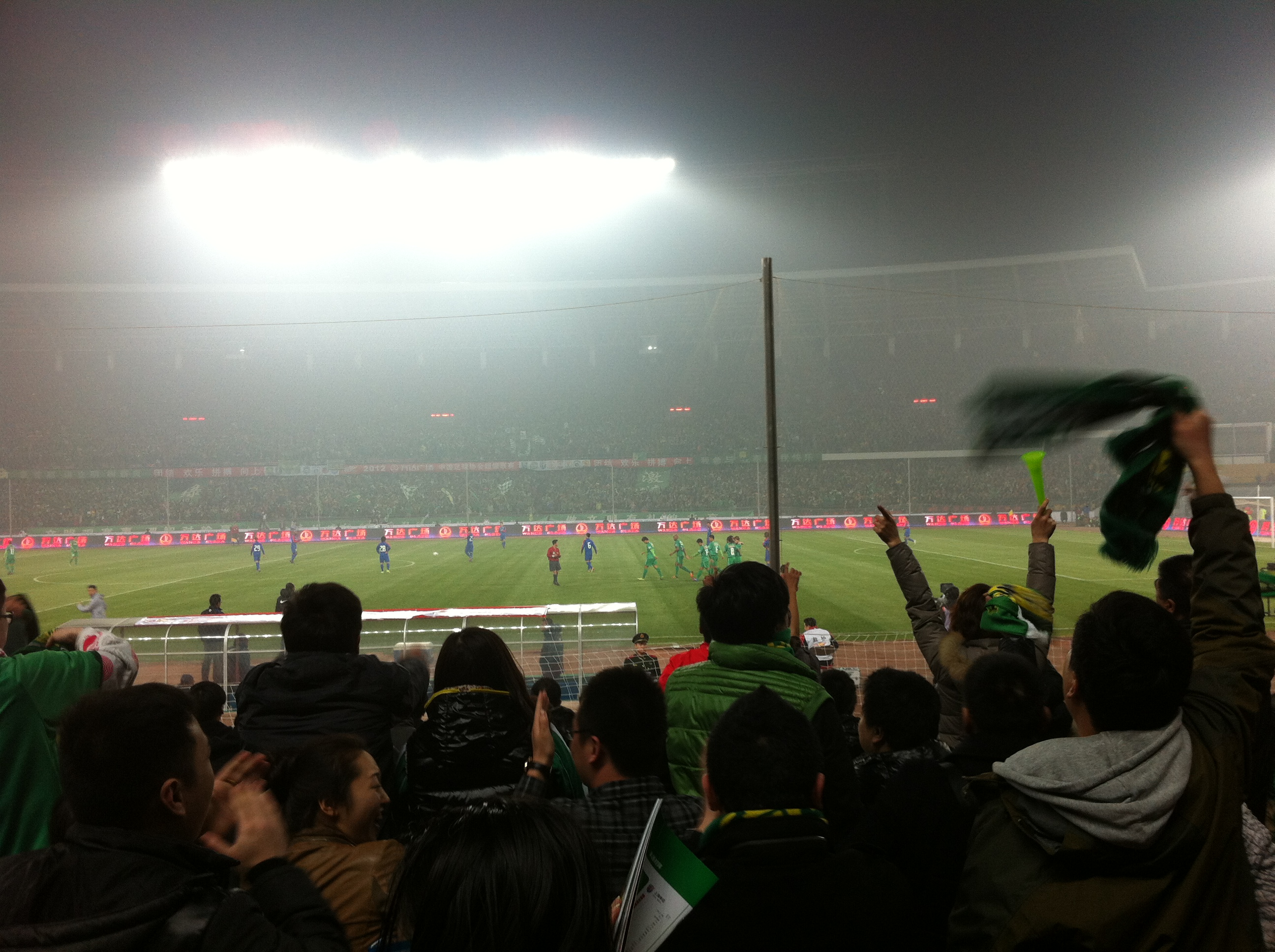
16 March 2012, Beijing Guoan played Shanghai Shenhua at home in the Workers' Stadium.

Today, the match between the two clubs is considered by fans of both teams to be the most important of the season. Victories and losses between the teams carry significance beyond just football and are seen as a competition between the two cities in which the teams are based directly, with Beijing being the capital of China and Shanghai being the nation’s most populous city and an economic hub. As a result, each encounter between the two sides becomes a focal point in the media, and is sometimes compared to El Clásico in Spain. The intensity of competition on the field between players from both sides is often very high, and the matches themselves receive significant attention from fans. Physical conflicts and confrontations off the field are also reported. Most of Shenhua's attendance records in their home stadiums were achieved when they hosted Guoan, and vice versa. Some Guoan fans say, "Without Guoan, there's no Shenhua; without Shenhua, there's no Guoan. These are the only two teams in China that deserve the title of a national derby." Shenhua fans, on the other hand, say, "Shenhua and Guoan are arch-rivals, but neither can do without the other. Without each other's presence in the league, it would be so boring."

=== Notable matches ===
The most noteworthy match between the two teams took place in the 10th round of the 1997 Jia-A League on 20 July 1997, where Guoan defeated Shenhua with a score of 9–1 at home. To this day, this match still holds several records in China's top-tier professional football league.

== Competitive matches ==
=== Chinese Jia-A League ===
#	Date	Matchday	Home team	Away team	Score	Guoan goalscorer(s)	Shenhua goalscorer(s)	Notes
1	24 April 1994	2	Shanghai Shenhua	Beijing Guoan	4–3	71' Deng Lejun; 78', 88' Cao Xiandong	7' Fan Zhiyi; 17', 66' Li Xiao; 82' Vladimir Nakhratov	
2	31 July 1994	13	Beijing Guoan	Shanghai Shenhua	5–1	2' Wei Zhankui; 14', 60' Gao Feng; 35' Wei Kexing; 46' Xie Feng	30' Liu Jun	
3	23 April 1995	2	Beijing Guoan	Shanghai Shenhua	2–0	40' Cao Xiandong; 67' Gao Feng		
4	17 September 1995	13	Shanghai Shenhua	Beijing Guoan	1–0		60' Xie Hui	
5	23 June 1996	11	Shanghai Shenhua	Beijing Guoan	1–1	87' Wei Kexing	62' Fan Zhiyi	
6	27 October 1996	22	Beijing Guoan	Shanghai Shenhua	1–0	57' (pen.) Xie Feng		
7	20 July 1997	10	Beijing Guoan	Shanghai Shenhua	9–1	15', 71', 75' Andrés Olivas; 17' Cao Xiandong; 31', 61', 81' Casiano Delvalle; 38' (pen.), 45' Jorge Campos	27' Wu Chengying	
8	18 December 1997	21	Shanghai Shenhua	Beijing Guoan	2–1	24' Jorge Campos	7' Wu Chengying; 33' Qi Hong	
9	19 April 1998	6	Shanghai Shenhua	Beijing Guoan	0–0			
10	23 September 1998	19	Beijing Guoan	Shanghai Shenhua	1–1	71' Andrés Olivas	45' Flávio de Paula Costa	
11	25 April 1999	6	Beijing Guoan	Shanghai Shenhua	0–1		85' Qi Hong	
12	15 August 1999	19	Shanghai Shenhua	Beijing Guoan	2–2	78' (pen.) Casiano Delvalle; 89' Li Yi	34', 51' Marcelo Sergipano	
13	2 April 2000	3	Shanghai Shenhua	Beijing Guoan	1–0		70' Bian Jun	
14	2 July 2000	16	Beijing Guoan	Shanghai Shenhua	3–3	18', 30' Wang Tao; 52' Sandro Sotilli	51', 54' Qi Hong; 67' Zoran Ranković	
15	18 March 2001	2	Beijing Guoan	Shanghai Shenhua	1–3	13' Xu Yunlong	53' Shen Si; 57' Zoran Ranković; 88' Saša Raca	
16	8 July 2001	15	Shanghai Shenhua	Beijing Guoan	1–0		10' Shen Si	
17	7 July 2002	8	Shanghai Shenhua	Beijing Guoan	1–1	90' Xu Yunlong	18' Saúl Martínez	
18	16 October 2002	22	Beijing Guoan	Shanghai Shenhua	2–1	10' Dragan Ilic; 57' Xu Yunlong	50' Qu Shengqing	
19	30 July 2003	12	Shanghai Shenhua	Beijing Guoan	1–0		24' Jörg Albertz	
20	23 November 2003	26	Beijing Guoan	Shanghai Shenhua	2–1	27' Krisztián Kenesei; 43' Lu Jiang	90' Zhang Yuning	

=== Chinese Super League ===
#	Date	Matchday	Home team	Away team	Score	Guoan goalscorer(s)	Shenhua goalscorer(s)	Notes
21	19 June 2004	7	Shanghai Shenhua	Beijing Guoan	2–2	29' Krisztián Kenesei; 36' Tao Wei	20' Jörg Albertz; 67' Peter Vera	
22	30 October 2004	18	Beijing Guoan	Shanghai Shenhua	3–0	6', 44' (pen.), 89' Tao Wei		
23	10 April 2005	2	Beijing Guoan	Shanghai Shenhua	4–0	11', 73' Branko Jelić; 29' Xu Yunlong; 82' Yang Hao		
24	20 July 2005	15	Shanghai Shenhua	Beijing Guoan	1–0		90' Xiao Zhanbo	
25	30 April 2006	9	Shanghai Shenhua	Beijing Guoan	0–0			
26	9 September 2006	23	Beijing Guoan	Shanghai Shenhua	0–1		54' Shen Longyuan	
27	3 March 2007	1	Shanghai Shenhua	Beijing Guoan	0–2	10' Tao Wei; 81' Alysson		
28	12 August 2007	15	Beijing Guoan	Shanghai Shenhua	2–3	1' Yan Xiangchuang; 76' (pen.) Tiago	56' Du Wei; 69' Diego Alonso; 82' Saúl Martínez	
29	29 June 2008	11	Beijing Guoan	Shanghai Shenhua	0–2		47' Yu Tao; 55' Jiang Kun	
30	8 November 2008	26	Shanghai Shenhua	Beijing Guoan	1–1	41' Du Wenhui	35' Mao Jianqing	
31	1 May 2009	7	Beijing Guoan	Shanghai Shenhua	0–0			
32	12 September 2009	22	Shanghai Shenhua	Beijing Guoan	1–1	77' Huang Bowen	30' Vyacheslav Hleb	
33	22 May 2010	9	Shanghai Shenhua	Beijing Guoan	3–2	4' Joel Griffiths; 81' Ryan Griffiths	10' Dai Lin; 11' Jean Michel N'Lend; 33' Duvier Riascos	
34	25 September 2010	24	Beijing Guoan	Shanghai Shenhua	4–1	33' Joel Griffiths; 74' Xu Liang; 84' Walter Martínez; 90' Du Wenhui	47' Feng Renliang	
35	6 July 2011	15	Beijing Guoan	Shanghai Shenhua	3–0	9' Joel Griffiths; 28' Lei Tenglong; 56' (pen.) Wang Xiaolong		
36	2 November 2011	30	Shanghai Shenhua	Beijing Guoan	1–0		90' Jiang Kun	
37	16 March 2012	2	Beijing Guoan	Shanghai Shenhua	3–2	43' Piao Cheng; 53' Manú; 82' Mao Jianqing	62' (pen.) Joel Griffiths; 67' Nicolas Anelka	
38	14 July 2012	17	Shanghai Shenhua	Beijing Guoan	3–1	80' (pen.) Wang Xiaolong	19' Song Boxuan; 51' Cao Yunding; 75' Moisés Moura	
39	26 May 2013	11	Shanghai Shenhua	Beijing Guoan	1–0		63' Giovanni Moreno	
40	28 September 2013	26	Beijing Guoan	Shanghai Shenhua	2–0	45', 56' Peter Utaka		
41	24 March 2014	3	Beijing Guoan	Shanghai Shenhua	2–0	41' (pen.) Zhang Xizhe; 53' Pablo Batalla		
42	2 August 2014	18	Shanghai Shenhua	Beijing Guoan	0–3	49' Dejan Damjanović; 83' Chen Zhizhao; 88' Piao Cheng		
43	3 April 2015	4	Beijing Guoan	Shanghai Shenhua	2–0	75' Darko Matić; 90' Erton Fejzullahu		
44	15 July 2015	19	Shanghai Shenhua	Beijing Guoan	3–1	71' Dejan Damjanović	39' Wang Yun; 58' Tim Cahill; 69' Demba Ba	
45	25 June 2016	14	Beijing Guoan	Shanghai Shenhua	2–1	66', 69' Zhang Xizhe	83' Demba Ba	
46	16 October 2016	29	Shanghai Shenhua	Beijing Guoan	0–0			
47	2 April 2017	3	Beijing Guoan	Shanghai Shenhua	2–1	38', 87' Burak Yılmaz	40' Cao Yunding	
48	23 July 2017	18	Shanghai Shenhua	Beijing Guoan	1–2	32', 49' (pen.) Jonathan Soriano	34' Giovanni Moreno	
49	28 July 2018	14	Shanghai Shenhua	Beijing Guoan	2–2	45+1' Renato Augusto; 65' Cédric Bakambu	54' Eddy Francis; 90+1' (o.g.) Wei Shihao	
50	7 November 2018	29	Beijing Guoan	Shanghai Shenhua	3–1	18' Zhang Xizhe; 32', 65' Cédric Bakambu	48' (o.g.) Yu Yang	
51	14 June 2019	13	Beijing Guoan	Shanghai Shenhua	2–1	14' Piao Cheng; 41' Renato Augusto	90' Wu Yizhen	
52	22 November 2019	28	Shanghai Shenhua	Beijing Guoan	1–2	6' Cédric Bakambu; 62' Renato Augusto	58' (pen.) Odion Ighalo	
53	23 April 2021	1	Shanghai Shenhua	Beijing Guoan	2–1	90+1' Li Lei	58' Giovanni Moreno; 62' Wu Xi	
54	15 August 2021	8	Beijing Guoan	Shanghai Shenhua	4–2	7', 81' Zhang Yuning; 12' (pen.) Zhang Xizhe; 15' (o.g.) Matej Jonjić	45+1' Cao Yunding; 90+6' Yu Hanchao	
55	26 August 2022	15	Beijing Guoan	Shanghai Shenhua	0–2		31' Yu Hanchao; 36' (pen.) Christian Bassogog	
56	25 November 2022	27	Shanghai Shenhua	Beijing Guoan	1–2	53' Zhang Xizhe; 75' Zhang Yuning	6' Denny Wang	
57	19 May 2023	8	Shanghai Shenhua	Beijing Guoan	1–1	67' Samuel Adegbenro	18' Yu Hanchao	
58	19 August 2023	23	Beijing Guoan	Shanghai Shenhua	2–1	28', 37' Fábio Abreu	14' Christian Bassogog	
59	13 April 2024	6	Shanghai Shenhua	Beijing Guoan	1–1	5' Zhang Yuning	25' André Luis	
60	4 August 2024	21	Beijing Guoan	Shanghai Shenhua	2–1	11' Michael Ngadeu-Ngadjui; 90+7' Wang Ziming	76' Cephas Malele	
61	1 March 2025	2	Shanghai Shenhua	Beijing Guoan	2–2	11' Lin Liangming; 90+3' (o.g.) Bao Yaxiong	38' Wu Xi; 45+1' (pen.) André Luis	
62	19 July 2025	17	Beijing Guoan	Shanghai Shenhua	1–3	26' Guga	7' Luis Asué; 21' Wu Xi; 90+7' Yu Hanchao	
63	21 March 2026	3	Beijing Guoan	Shanghai Shenhua	1–1	23' Zhang Yuning	68' Shinichi Chan	
64	18 August 2026	18	Shanghai Shenhua	Beijing Guoan	0–3	42' Guilherme Ramos; 73' Cao Yongjing; 86' Zhang Xizhe		

=== Chinese FA Cup ===
Date	Round		Home team	Away team	Score	Guoan goalscorer(s)	Shenhua goalscorer(s)	Notes
28 December 1997	Final		Beijing Guoan	Shanghai Shenhua	2–1	39' Casiano Delvalle; 72' Nan Fang	5' (o.g.) Deng Lejun	
10 August 2005	Quarter-finals	First leg	Beijing Guoan	Shanghai Shenhua	2–0	5' Gao Dawei; 70' (pen.) Dan Alexa		Guoan advanced 3–2 on aggregate
7 September 2005	Quarter-finals	Second leg	Shanghai Shenhua	Beijing Guoan	2–1	110' Sui Dongliang	22', 29' Xie Hui	Guoan advanced 3–2 on aggregate
21 June 2017	4th round		Shanghai Shenhua	Beijing Guoan	1–0		56' Fredy Guarín	
22 August 2024	Quarter-finals		Shanghai Shenhua	Beijing Guoan	2–1	90+3' Zhang Yuning	12' João Carlos Teixeira; 90+1' Shinichi Chan	

=== Chinese FA Super Cup ===
Season	Date	Location	League Champion	FA Cup Champion	Score	Guoan goalscorer(s)	Shenhua goalscorer(s)	Notes
2003	18 January 2004	Wuhu, Anhui	Shanghai Shenhua	Beijing Guoan	3–4	25', 63' (pen.) Krisztián Kenesei; 51' Xu Yunlong; 73' Yang Hao	8' Zhang Yuning; 57' Zheng Kewei; 65' (pen.) Jörg Albertz	

== Statistics ==
As of 18 August 2026

	Matches	Wins		Draws	Goals	
	Matches	Guoan	Shenhua	Draws	Guoan	Shenhua
Chinese Super League	44	21	12	11	73	50
Chinese Jia-A League	20	6	8	6	34	26
Chinese FA Cup	5	2	3	0	6	6
Chinese FA Super Cup	1	1	0	0	4	3
All matches	70	30	23	17	117	85

=== Head-to-head ranking in the domestic league (1994–present) ===
Beijing Guoan's positions are marked with a green background, while Shanghai Shenhua's positions are marked with a blue background.

P.	94	95	96	97	98	99	00	01	02	03	04	05	06	07	08	09	10	11	12	13	14	15	16	17	18	19	20	21	22	23	24	25	26
1		1								~~1~~ (Note: Shanghai Shenhua finished as champions. However, they were later retrospectively stripped of the title on 19 February 2013 for match-fixing.)						1																	
2		2	2	2	2		2	2				2	2	2	2			2			2					2					2	2	
3	3			3	3				3				3		3		3		3	3							3						3
4			4											4								4	4		4						4	4	
5						5										5	5						5					5		5			
6						6	6					6										6								6			
7											7														7		7		7				7
8	8							8												8													
9										9									9		9			9				9					
10											10																		10				
11																		11						11									
12									12																								
13																										13							
14																																	
15																																	
16																																	
17																																	
18																																	

- Total: Shanghai Shenhua with 17 higher finishes, Beijing Guoan with 16 higher finishes (as of the end of the 2026 season).
- The biggest difference in positions for Beijing Guoan from Shanghai Shenhua is 11 places in the 2019 season; the biggest difference in positions for Shanghai Shenhua from Beijing Guoan is 8 places in the 2003 season. (Note: Otherwise, the largest difference in positions positions for Shanghai Shenhua from Beijing Guoan is 6 places, achieved in the 2001 season.)

== Records ==
=== Top goalscorers ===
As of 18 August 2026
Bold indicates players currently playing for either club, players in italics are still active outside either club.

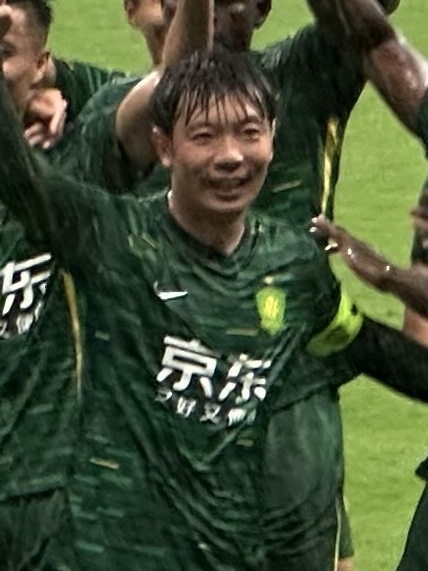
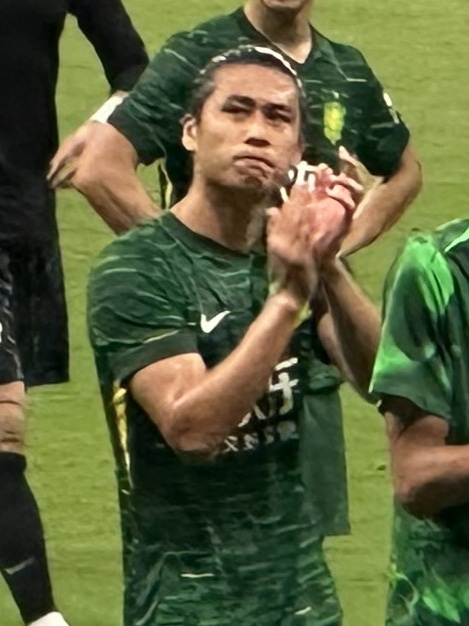
Zhang Xizhe (left) and Zhang Yuning (right) are the all-time topscorers in Jing–Hu rivalry history, with seven and six goals respectively.

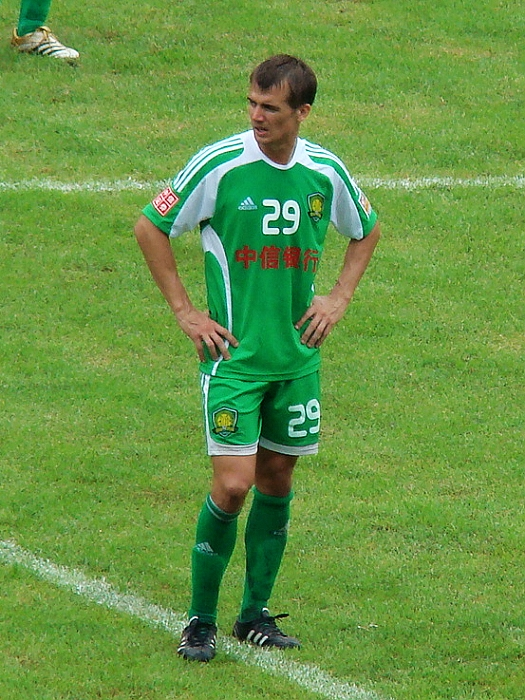
Joel Griffiths is one of two players to have scored for both clubs in the Jing–Hu rivalry, the other being Mao Jianqing.

Rank	Player	Club	CSL	Jia-A League	CFA Cup	CFA Super Cup	Total
1	**(China) Zhang Xizhe**	Beijing Guoan	7	—	—	—	7
2	**(China) Zhang Yuning**	Beijing Guoan	5	—	1	—	6
3	(Paraguay) Casiano Delvalle	Beijing Guoan	—	4	1	—	5
3	(China) Xu Yunlong	Beijing Guoan	1	3	—	1	5
3	(China) Tao Wei	Beijing Guoan	5	—	—	—	5
6	(China) Cao Xiandong	Beijing Guoan	—	4	—	—	4
6	(Spain) Andrés Olivas	Beijing Guoan	—	4	—	—	4
6	(China) Qi Hong	Shanghai Shenhua	—	4	—	—	4
6	(Hungary) Krisztián Kenesei	Beijing Guoan	1	1	—	2	4
6	(Australia) Joel Griffiths	Both clubs	4	—	—	—	4
6	(Democratic Republic of the Congo) Cédric Bakambu	Beijing Guoan	4	—	—	—	4
6	**(China)** Yu Hanchao	Shanghai Shenhua	4	—	—	—	4
13	(China) Gao Feng	Beijing Guoan	—	3	—	—	3
13	(Paraguay) Jorge Campos	Beijing Guoan	—	3	—	—	3
13	(China) Xie Hui	Shanghai Shenhua	—	1	2	—	3
13	(Germany) Jörg Albertz	Shanghai Shenhua	1	1	—	1	3
13	(China) Piao Cheng	Beijing Guoan	3	—	—	—	3
13	(Brazil) Renato Augusto	Beijing Guoan	3	—	—	—	3
13	(Colombia) Giovanni Moreno	Shanghai Shenhua	3	—	—	—	3
13	(China) Cao Yunding	Shanghai Shenhua	3	—	—	—	3
13	**(China) Wu Xi**	Shanghai Shenhua	3	—	—	—	3

=== Players at both clubs ===
A total of fifteen players have played for both clubs:

- (Brazil) Aderaldo
- (China) Gao Tianyi
- (Australia) Joel Griffiths
- (China) Jiang Shenglong (Note: Player played for Beijing Guoan in his youth career.) (Note: Player never made a senior appearance for Shanghai Shenhua.)
- (China) Li Yunqiu
- (China) Luo Xi
- (China) Mao Jianqing
- (Honduras) Emil Martínez
- (Serbia) Zoran Ranković
- (China) Song Boxuan
- (China) Wang Changqing
- (China) Wang Ke
- (China) Wang Shuo
- (China) Xu Liang
- (China) Nico Yennaris

=== Managers at both clubs ===
A total of three managers have managed both clubs:

- (Spain) Gregorio Manzano
- (Serbia) Ljupko Petrović
- (China) Shen Xiangfu
