= List of Beijing Guoan F.C. managers =

Beijing Guoan Football Club is a professional Chinese football club that currently participates in the Chinese Super League under licence from the Chinese Professional Football League (CFL). The team is based in the Chaoyang District in Beijing. Since its inception, Beijing Guoan have had 25 managers across 33 spells. Nick Montgomery is the current manager.

== Background ==
Tang Pengju was the club's first manager during their professional season. Beijing finished in a disappointing eighth out of twelve teams and the manager Tang Pengju was relieved of his duties. Serbian Milovan Đorić would be Beijing's first foray with a foreign manager when he joined the club at the start of the 2000 league season. His reign was exceptionally short-lived after he lost his first three games of the season before he was replaced with native coach Wei Kexing.

Jin Zhiyang became the first manager who lead Beijing to their first professional trophy when he beat Jinan Taishan Jiangjun 4–1 to lift the 1996 Chinese FA Cup. He is also the club's most successful manager in terms of trophies won, for 2 Chinese FA Cup Champions. After the dismissal of Lee Jang-soo in September 2009, as the caretaker manager, former Beijing player Hong Yuanshuo was immediately brought into the team and on the final day of the season Beijing thrashed Hangzhou Greentown 4–0 to clinch the 2009 league championship, and this is the only league champion they have won so far.

== Managers ==
Information correct as of 31 May 2026. Only competitive matches since 1994 are counted.

Table headers

- Nationality – If the manager played international football as a player, the country/countries he played for are shown. Otherwise, the manager's nationality is given as their country of birth.
- P – The number of games managed for Beijing Guoan.
- W – The number of games won as a manager.
- D – The number of games draw as a manager.
- L – The number of games lost as a manager.
- GF – The number of goals scored under his management.
- GA – The number of goals conceded under his management.
- Win% – The total winning percentage under his management.
- Honours – The trophies won while managing Beijing Guoan.

List of Beijing Guoan F.C. managers
Image	Name (Birth-Death)	Nationality	From	To	Duration	P	W	D	L	GF	GA	Win%	Honours	Notes
	Tang Pengju (Born 1957)	China	1 January 1994	31 December 1994	364 days	22	7	8	7	42	34	31.82		
	Jin Zhiyang (Born 1944)	China	13 January 1995	4 February 1998	3 years, 22 days	93	49	25	19	162	84	52.69	2 Chinese FA Cups	
	Shen Xiangfu (Born 1957)	China	4 February 1998	5 December 1999	1 year, 304 days	67	26	24	17	93	61	38.81		
	Milovan Đorić (Born 1945)	Serbia	15 December 1999	4 April 2000	111 days	3	0	0	3	1	5	0.00		
	Wei Kexing (Born 1963)	China	4 April 2000	7 January 2002	1 year, 278 days	64	26	16	22	89	78	40.63		
	Ljupko Petrović (Born 1947)	Serbia	7 January 2002	23 December 2002	350 days	29	15	7	7	49	30	51.72		
	Jose Carlos de Oliveira (Born 1947)	Brazil	23 December 2002	11 April 2003	109 days	9	4	2	3	15	8	44.44		
	Ljupko Petrović (Born 1947)	Serbia	16 April 2003	3 October 2003	170 days	14	5	3	6	17	15	35.71	1 Chinese FA Cup	
	Wei Kexing (executive) (Born 1963)	China	3 October 2003	23 December 2004	1 year, 81 days	14	5	3	6	17	15	35.71		(Note: The de facto final decision maker of the team was held by club's Chairman Yang Zuwu during Wei's time as manager.)
	Shen Xiangfu (Born 1957)	China	23 December 2004	23 October 2006	1 year, 304 days	66	29	16	21	89	67	43.94		
	Lee Jang-soo (Born 1956)	South Korea	2 December 2006	16 September 2009	2 years, 288 days	93	45	30	18	138	84	48.39		
	Hong Yuanshuo (1948–2015)	China	16 September 2009	21 September 2010	1 year, 5 days	37	15	12	10	42	33	40.54	1 Super League title	
	Wei Kexing (caretaker) (Born 1963)	China	21 September 2010	6 November 2010	46 days	7	4	2	1	13	8	57.14		
	Jaime Pacheco (Born 1958)	Portugal	24 December 2010	13 November 2012	1 year, 325 days	72	32	20	20	107	72	44.44		
	Aleksandar Stanojević (Born 1973)	Serbia	28 November 2012	10 January 2014	1 year, 43 days	42	18	13	11	72	46	42.86		
	Xie Feng (caretaker) (Born 1966)	China	30 January 2014	17 February 2014	18 days	1	1	0	0	4	0	100.00		
	Gregorio Manzano (Born 1956)	Spain	17 February 2014	27 November 2015	1 year, 283 days	80	45	18	17	120	68	56.25		
	Alberto Zaccheroni (Born 1953)	Italy	10 January 2016	19 May 2016	130 days	10	3	3	4	10	10	30.00		
	Xie Feng (caretaker) (Born 1966)	China	19 May 2016	30 October 2016	164 days	24	10	7	7	32	21	41.67		
	José González (Born 1966)	Spain	23 November 2016	2 June 2017	191 days	13	5	3	5	21	21	38.46		
	Xie Feng (caretaker) (Born 1966)	China	2 June 2017	30 June 2017	28 days	4	1	1	2	3	3	25.00		
	Roger Schmidt (Born 1967)	Germany	1 July 2017	31 July 2019	2 years, 30 days	83	46	14	23	153	99	55.42	1 Chinese FA Cup	
	Bruno Génésio (Born 1966)	France	31 July 2019	6 January 2021	1 year, 159 days	39	24	9	6	80	45	61.54		
	Stanley Menzo (Born 1963)	Netherlands	28 November 2020	2 December 2020	4 days	2	1	0	1	1	3	50.00		(Note: Stanley Menzo was in charge of two 2020 Chinese FA Cup matches with the Beijing Guoan reserves while the first-team travelled to Qatar for the 2020 AFC Champions League with Bruno Génésio.)
	Slaven Bilić (Born 1968)	Croatia	6 January 2021	8 January 2022	1 year, 2 days	23	9	7	7	27	29	39.13		
	Zoran Janković (Born 1974)	Bulgaria	26 June 2021	11 July 2021	15 days	6	0	1	5	3	23	0.00		(Note: Zoran Janković was in charge of six 2021 AFC Champions League matches with the Beijing Guoan reserves while the first-team stayed in China for the 2021 Chinese Super League with Slaven Bilić.)
	Xie Feng (Born 1966)	China	14 January 2022	12 August 2022	210 days	12	4	4	4	16	19	33.33		
	Sui Dongliang (caretaker) (Born 1977)	China	12 August 2022	29 August 2022	17 days	3	2	0	1	5	3	66.67		
	Stanley Menzo (Born 1963)	Netherlands	29 August 2022	11 June 2023	286 days	32	15	10	7	59	46	46.88		(Note: Includes two league matches at the end of the 2022 season for which Guoan forfeited as a result of COVID-19 infections within the team.)
	Ricardo Soares (Born 1974)	Portugal	15 June 2023	10 December 2024	1 year, 178 days	54	30	12	12	111	58	55.56		
	Quique Setién (Born 1958)	Spain	10 December 2024	5 October 2025	299 days	32	17	9	6	74	45	53.13		
	Ramiro Amarelle (caretaker) (Born 1977)	Spain	7 October 2025	21 December 2025	75 days	9	4	1	4	23	14	44.44	1 Chinese FA Cup	
	Nick Montgomery (Born 1981)	Scotland	8 January 2026	Current	145 days	16	6	5	5	28	23	37.50	1 Chinese FA Super Cup	
