= 1997 Chinese Jia-A League =

Chinese Jia-A League
- Season: 1997
- Champions: Dalian Wanda (3rd title)
- Relegated: Tianjin Lifei; Guangdong Hongyuan
- Asian Club Championship: Dalian Wanda
- Matches: 132
- Goals: 305 (2.31 per match)
- Top goalscorer: Hao Haidong (14 goals)
- Average attendance: 21,220

The 1997 Chinese Jia-A League season (known as Marlboro Jia-A League for sponsorship reasons) was the fourth season of professional association football and the 36th top-tier overall league season held in China. Starting on March 16 and ending on November 29, it was contested by 12 teams and Dalian Wanda won the championship making it their third championship title.

== Events ==
On 20 July 1997, in a round 10 league fixture, Beijing Guoan defeated Shanghai Shenhua in the Jing–Hu rivalry by a score of 9−1.

== Promotion and relegation ==
Teams promoted from 1996 Chinese Jia-B League

- Qianwei Huandao
- Qingdao Hainiu

Teams relegated from 1996 Chinese Jia-A League

- Shenzhen Feiyada
- Guangzhou Songri

== Personnel ==
Team	Manager
August 1st	
Beijing Guoan	(China) Jin Zhiyang
Dalian Wanda	(China) Chi Shangbin
Guangdong Hongyuan	(China) He Jinlun
Guangzhou Apollo	(China) Mai Chao
Jinan Taishan General	(China) Yin Tiesheng
Qianwei Huanduo	(Germany) Klaus Schlappner
Qingdao Hainiu	(China) Liu Guojiang
Shanghai Shenhua	(Poland) Andrzej Strejlau
Sichuan Quanxing	
Tianjin Lifei	(China) Chen Jingang
Yanbian Aodong	(South Korea) Choi Eun-taek

== Foreign players ==
As a military-owned team, August 1st were not allowed to sign any foreign players.

Club	Player 1	Player 2	Player 3	Former players
Beijing Guoan	(Paraguay) Casiano Delvalle	(Paraguay) Jorge Campos	(Spain) Andrés Olivas	(Kenya) William Inganga
Dalian Wanda	(Sweden) Jens Fjellström	(Sweden) Niclas Nylén	(Sweden) Stefan Lindqvist	(Belarus) Oleg Dulub (Sweden) Magnus Sköldmark
Guangdong Hongyuan	(England) Mark Brennan	(England) Paul Raynor	(South Africa) Mark Williams	(Brazil) Cal
Guangzhou Apollo	(Australia) Peter Blazincic	(Australia) Robert Markovac	(Nigeria) Dominic Iorfa	(Denmark) Kim Rasmussen (Denmark) Riffi Haddaoui
Jinan Taishan General				
Qianwei Huandao	(England) Paul Rideout	(Paraguay) Jacinto Rodríguez	(Peru) Andrés González	(Germany) Jens Kunath (Germany) Stefan Beneking (Ghana) Frederick Commodore
Qingdao Hainiu	(Zambia) David Slame	(Zambia) Kabamba Kalande		(Russia) Viktor Derbunov
Shanghai Shenhua	(Bulgaria) Valentin Stanchev	(Paraguay) Adolfo Fatecha	(Russia) Valeri Kleymyonov	(Bulgaria) Dimitar Vasev (France) Christian Perez (Paraguay) Edgar Denis
Sichuan Quanxing	(Brazil) Fabiano	(Brazil) Marcelo Marmelo	(Ukraine) Ihor Lishchuk	
Tianjin Samsung	(Argentina) Javier Espínola	(Brazil) Ronaldo	(Spain) José González	(Brazil) Osvaldo Kosinski
Yanbian Aodong	(Democratic Republic of the Congo) Bulayima Mukuayanzo	(Democratic Republic of the Congo) Zola Kiniambi	(South Korea) Choi Sang-hoon	(South Korea) Lee Jun-tae

== League standings ==
Pos	Team	Pld	W	D	L	GF	GA	GD	Pts	Qualification or relegation
1	Dalian Wanda	22	15	6	1	47	16	+31	51	1998–99 Asian Club Championship qualification
2	Shanghai Shenhua	22	11	7	4	36	22	+14	40	
3	Beijing Guoan	22	8	10	4	34	20	+14	34	
4	Yanbian Aodong	22	8	5	9	23	23	0	29	
5	Qianwei Huandao	22	8	5	9	28	28	0	29	
6	Jinan Taishan General	22	7	7	8	19	22	−3	28	
7	Sichuan Quanxing	22	6	9	7	30	27	+3	27	
8	Guangzhou Apollo	22	5	10	7	14	20	−6	25	
9	Qingdao Hainiu	22	6	7	9	16	27	−11	25	
10	August 1st	22	5	10	7	22	34	−12	25	
11	Tianjin Lifei	22	5	8	9	20	28	−8	23	Relegated to Jia-B League
12	Guangdong Hongyuan	22	4	4	14	16	38	−22	16	Relegated to Jia-B League

Source: rsssf.com
