= 1998 Chinese Jia-A League =

Chinese Jia-A League
- Season: 1998
- Champions: Dalian Wanda (4th title)
- Relegated: August 1st; Guangzhou Apollo
- Asian Club Championship: Dalian Wanda
- Matches: 182
- Goals: 437 (2.4 per match)
- Top goalscorer: Hao Haidong (18 goals)
- Average attendance: 21,335

The 1998 Chinese Jia-A League season (known as Marlboro Jia-A League for sponsorship reasons) was the fifth season of professional association football and the 37th top-tier overall league season held in China. The league, which was expanded to 14 teams, started on March 22 and ended on October 25, where it saw Dalian Wanda win their third consecutive league title.

== Promotion and relegation ==
Teams promoted from 1997 Chinese Jia-B League

- Wuhan Yaqi (Renamed Wuhan Hongjinlong)
- Shenzhen Pingan
- Shenyang Haishi
- Guangzhou Songri

Teams relegated from 1997 Chinese Jia-A League

- Tianjin Lifei
- Guangdong Hongyuan

== Personnel ==
Team	Manager
August 1st	
Beijing Guoan	(China) Shen Xiangfu
Dalian Wanda	(China) Xu Genbao
Guangzhou Apollo	(China) Chen Xirong
Guangzhou Songri	(Brazil) Edson Tavares
Qianwei Huanduo	(South Korea) Lee Jang-soo
Qingdao Yizhong Hainiu	(China) Li Yingfa
Shandong Luneng	(China) Yin Tiesheng
Shanghai Shenhua	(Brazil) Muricy Ramalho
Shenyang Haishi	(China) Li Qiang
Shenzhen Pingan	(South Korea) Cha Bum-kun
Sichuan Quanxing	(China) Chi Shangbin
Wuhan Hongjinlong	(China) Qi Wusheng
Yanbian Aodong	(South Korea) Choi Eun-taek

== Foreign players ==
As a military-owned team, August 1st were not allowed to sign any foreign players.

Club	Player 1	Player 2	Player 3	Former players
Beijing Guoan	(Paraguay) Jorge Campos	(Spain) Andrés Olivas		(Paraguay) Raúl Román
Dalian Wanda	(Czech Republic) Václav Němeček	(Sweden) Hans Eklund	(Sweden) Jens Fjellström	(Netherlands) Glenn Helder
Guangzhou Apollo	(Australia) Peter Blazincic	(Federal Republic of Yugoslavia) Ivica Šimičić	(South Korea) Park Ji-ho	
Guangzhou Songri	(Brazil) Jacksen F. Tiago	(Uruguay) Leonardo Jara	(Uruguay) Tony Gómez	(Hungary) András Vilnrotter-Babócsy
Qianwei Huandao	(Russia) Akhrik Tsveiba	(South Africa) Mark Williams	(United States) Jerry Laterza	(Georgia (country)) Giorgi Chikhradze (Russia) Oleg Yeryomin
Qingdao Yizhong Hainiu	(Zambia) Edward Kangwa	(Zambia) James Phiri	(Zambia) Sidney Mambwe	(Zambia) Aaron Lubunda
Shandong Luneng	(Bosnia and Herzegovina) Amir Osmanović	(Brazil) Edson Paulista	(Brazil) Luizinho Vieira	(Brazil) Zé Carlos
Shanghai Shenhua	(Argentina) Fabián Suescun	(Brazil) Édson Pezinho	(Paraguay) Osvaldo Cohener	(Brazil) Cláudio Moura (Brazil) Flávio (Brazil) Guido (Brazil) Sandro Becker (Paraguay) Elvio Sandoval (Russia) Valeri Kleymyonov
Shenyang Haishi	(Brazil) Paulinho	(Cameroon) Tobie Mimboe	(Peru) Miguel Miranda	(Brazil) Rosinaldo (North Korea) Li Yong-jin
Shenzhen Pingan	(Cameroon) Bertin Tomou	(Morocco) Abdelkrim Jinani	(Peru) Álvaro Barco	
Sichuan Quanxing	(Croatia) Aleksandar Bubnić	(Federal Republic of Yugoslavia) Zoran Mašić	(Uruguay) Marcelo de los Santos	
Wuhan Hongjinlong	(Burundi) Michel Minko	(South Korea) Lee Doo-young	(South Korea) Park Jong-chan	(Bulgaria) Rumen Panayotov (Bulgaria) Stoyan Atsarov (South Korea) Hong Do-pyo (South Korea) Kim Tae-hoon (South Korea) Lee Young-bae
Yanbian Aodong	(Democratic Republic of the Congo) Bulayima Mukuayanzo	(Rwanda) Claude Kalisa	(South Korea) Noh Joo-seop	(Senegal) Cheikh Gadiaga (South Korea) Park Soon-bae

== League standings ==
Pos	Team	Pld	W	D	L	GF	GA	GD	Pts	Qualification or relegation
1	Dalian Wanda	26	19	5	2	64	16	+48	62	1999–2000 Asian Club Championship qualification
2	Shanghai Shenhua	26	11	12	3	43	23	+20	45	
3	Beijing Guoan	26	10	13	3	32	19	+13	43	
4	Guangzhou Songri	26	10	6	10	23	33	−10	36	
5	Sichuan Quanxing	26	8	10	8	32	34	−2	34	
6	Qingdao Yizhong Hainiu	26	8	8	10	24	30	−6	32	
7	Qianwei Huandao	26	8	8	10	29	29	0	32	
8	Wuhan Hongjinlong	26	8	8	10	26	33	−7	32	
9	Shandong Luneng	26	8	8	10	39	40	−1	32	
10	Shenyang Haishi	26	7	10	9	19	28	−9	31	
11	Yanbian Aodong	26	9	4	13	25	31	−6	31	
12	Shenzhen Pingan	26	7	9	10	29	43	−14	30	
13	August 1st	26	8	5	13	27	37	−10	29	Relegated to Jia-B League
14	Guangzhou Apollo	26	4	8	14	25	41	−16	20	Relegated to Jia-B League

Source: rsssf.com

== Awards ==
Player of the Year (Golden Ball Award)

- Hao Haidong (Dalian Wanda)

Top Scorer (Golden Boot Award)

- Hao Haidong (Dalian Wanda)

Manager of the Year

- Xu Genbao (Dalian Wanda)

Best Referee

- Lu Jun (Beijing)

== See also ==
- Chinese Jia-A League
- Chinese Super League
- Chinese Football Association Jia League
- Chinese Football Association Yi League
- Chinese FA Cup
- Chinese Football Association
- Football in China
- Football records and statistics in China
- Chinese football clubs in the AFC Champions League
