= Zhou Ning =

Chinese association football player

Personal information
- Date of birth: 2 April 1974 (age 52)
- Place of birth: Beijing, China
- Height: 1.88 m (6 ft 2 in)
- Position: Forward

Youth career
- 1993: Beijing Youth

Senior career*
Years	Team	Apps	(Gls)
1994–1998	Beijing Guoan	86	(7)
1998–2000	Waldhof Mannheim	45	(4)
2000–2004	Beijing Hyundai	38	(1)
Total		169	(12)

International career
1995–2000	China	4	(0)
- * Club domestic league appearances and goals

Zhou Ning (Chinese: 周宁; born 2 April 1974) is a former Chinese footballer who played as a forward for the China national football team.

== Career statistics ==
=== Club ===
Club	Season	League			Cup		Continental		Other		Total	
Club	Season	Division	Apps	Goals	Apps	Goals	Apps	Goals	Apps	Goals	Apps	Goals
Beijing Guoan	1995	Jia-A	22	1	0	0	–		0	0	5	0
Beijing Guoan	1996	Jia-A	6	0	0	0	–		0	0	5	0
Beijing Guoan	1997	Jia-A	16	1	0	0	–		0	0	5	0
Beijing Guoan	1998	Jia-A	20	2	0	0	–		0	0	5	0
Beijing Guoan	Total		64	4	0	0	0	0	0	0	64	4
Waldhof Mannheim	1998–99	Regionalliga	15	3	0	0	–		0	0	15	3
Waldhof Mannheim	1999–00	2. Bundesliga	30	1	2 (Note: Appearances in the DFB Pokal)	0	–		0	0	32	1
Waldhof Mannheim	Total		45	4	2	0	0	0	0	0	47	4
Beijing Hyundai	2001	Jia-A	19	0	0	0	–		0	0	5	0
Beijing Hyundai	2002	Jia-A	12	0	0	0	–		0	0	24	0
Beijing Hyundai	2003	Jia-A	6	1	0	0	–		1 (Note: Appearances in the Chinese FA Super Cup)	0	29	0
Beijing Hyundai	2004	Chinese Super League	1	0	0	0	–		0	0	17	0
Beijing Hyundai	Total		38	1	0	0	0	0	1	0	39	1
Career total			147	9	2	0	0	0	1	0	150	9

=== International ===
National team	Year	Apps	Goals
China	1995	3	0
China	2000	1	0
Total		4	0
