= Xie Hongjun =

Chinese footballer (1929–2020)

Xie Hongjun 谢鸿钧
Personal information
- Full name: Xie Hongjun
- Date of birth: 2 August 1929
- Place of birth: Zhongshan, Guangdong, China
- Date of death: 17 October 2020 (aged 91)
- Height: 1.77 m (5 ft 9 1/2 in)

Youth career
- Shanghai Jiangnan Shipyard

Senior career*
Years	Team	Apps	(Gls)
1951–1952	Shanghai Team		
- Navy Team
1952–1954	Bayi		

International career
1953–1956	China		
- * Club domestic league appearances and goals

Xie Hongjun (simplified Chinese: 谢鸿钧; traditional Chinese: 謝鴻鈞; pinyin: Xiè Hóngjūn; 2 August 1929 – 17 October 2020) was a Chinese footballer.

== Club career ==
As an 11-year-old, Xie Hongjun played for Shanghai Jiangnan Shipyard's football team. Throughout his career, Hongjun played for Shanghai Team, East Team, the Navy football team and Bayi. Xie was regarded as China's fastest football player, running 100 metres in 11.2 seconds.

== International career ==
Xie made his debut for China in 1953. In 1954, Xie travelled with the Chinese national team on a year-and-a-half long tour of Hungary and eastern Europe. In 1956, Xie was selected to play for China at the 1956 Summer Olympics, however China withdrew.

== Coaching career ==
In 1975, Xie became a youth team coach for Beijing. Xie began to coach his son, Xie Feng, when he was three years-old.

== Personal life ==
Xie Hongjun was married to former Chinese sprinter Zheng Yuru (Chinese: 郑玉茹). Together they had a son, Xie Feng, who played for Beijing Guoan and Shenzhen Pingan. Xie Hongjun died on 17 October 2020, at the age of 91.
