= Li Chengming =

Chinese association football player

Personal information
- Date of birth: 11 April 1978 (age 48)
- Place of birth: Shanghai, China
- Height: 1.82 m (6 ft 0 in)
- Position: Defender

Youth career
- 1993–1996: Baosteel Shanghai

Senior career*
Years	Team	Apps	(Gls)
1997–2006	Shanghai Shenhua	86	(0)
Total		86	(0)
- * Club domestic league appearances and goals

Li Chengming (Chinese: 李诚铭; born 11 April 1978) is a former Chinese footballer who played as a defender for the Shanghai Shenhua. He currently serves as an assistant coach for the Shanghai-based club.

== Career statistics ==
=== Club ===
Club	Season	League			Cup		Continental		Other		Total	
Club	Season	Division	Apps	Goals	Apps	Goals	Apps	Goals	Apps	Goals	Apps	Goals
Shanghai Shenhua	1997	Jia-A	9	0	0	0	–		0	0	9	0
Shanghai Shenhua	1998	Jia-A	10	0	0	0	–		0	0	10	0
Shanghai Shenhua	1999	Jia-A	2	0	0	0	–		0	0	2	0
Shanghai Shenhua	2000	Jia-A	13	0	0	0	–		0	0	13	0
Shanghai Shenhua	2001	Jia-A	9	0	0	0	–		0	0	9	0
Shanghai Shenhua	2002	Jia-A	9	0	0	0	–		0	0	9	0
Shanghai Shenhua	2003	Jia-A	13	0	0	0	–		1 (Note: Appearances in the Chinese FA Super Cup)	0	14	0
Shanghai Shenhua	2004	Chinese Super League	12	0	0	0	–		0	0	12	0
Shanghai Shenhua	2005	Chinese Super League	6	0	0	0	–		0	0	6	0
Shanghai Shenhua	2006	Chinese Super League	3	0	2 (Note: Appearances in the Chinese FA Cup)	0	3 (Note: Appearances in the AFC Champions League)	0	0	0	8	0
Career total			86	0	2	0	3	0	1	0	92	0
