= Hong Yuanshuo =

Chinese footballer and manager

Hong Yuanshuo 洪元硕
Personal information
- Full name: Hong Yuanshuo
- Date of birth: 31 March 1948
- Place of birth: Beijing, China
- Date of death: 1 August 2015 (aged 67)
- Place of death: Beijing, China

Team information
- Current team: Beijing Guoan

Senior career*
Years	Team	Apps	(Gls)
1973–1980	Beijing	?	(?)

International career
1973	China	?	(?)

Managerial career
- 1997–1998: Beijing Kuanli
- 2009: Beijing Guoan (caretaker)
- 2010: Beijing Guoan
- * Club domestic league appearances and goals

Hong Yuanshuo (simplified Chinese: 洪元硕; traditional Chinese: 洪元碩; pinyin: Hóng Yuánshuò; 31 March 1948 – 1 August 2015) was a Chinese football manager and a former player. Throughout his playing career he spent all of it with Beijing where he won the 1973 league title with them. Since retiring he would move into scouting before moving into management with third-tier club Beijing Kuanli in 1997. By 2009 he would return to his former club as a manager to aid them in their successful push for the 2009 Chinese Super League title.

== Playing career ==
At the early 70s, Hong Yuanshuo joined Beijing football team. He played for winger and became the team captain. In 1973, Hong selected by head coach Nian Weisi into the China national football team.

== Management career ==
=== Early management career ===
After he retired he was worked in the youth team of Beijing from 1980. In that years he scouts many important player of Beijing Guoan and national team, including Gao Feng, Cao Xiandong, Deng Lejun, Tao Wei and Huang Bowen.

=== Beijing Kuanli ===
Hong Yuanshuo was appointed the manager of China League Two club Beijing Kuanli in the 1997 league season. Under Hong Yuanshuo, Beijing Kuanli successfully promoted to Chinese Jia-B League.

=== Beijing Guoan ===
After round 23 of the 2009 league season Hong Yuanshuo was appointed as caretaker manager of Beijing Guoan who required a manager after Lee Jang-Soo left. Finally, Beijing Guoan won the championship of China Super League 2009 without losing any games from round 24 to 30.

At the beginning of season 2010, Hong officially appointed head coach of Beijing Guoan. He was sacked by the club on 21 September 2010.

== Personal life ==
Hong Yuanshuo is the son of Chinese philosopher Hong Qian (Chinese: 洪谦, 1909–1992).

== Death ==
Hong was diagnosed as colorectal cancer in 2011. He died on 1 August 2015, aged 67.

== Honours ==
=== Player ===
Beijing

- Chinese Jia-A League: 1973

=== Manager ===
Beijing Guoan

- China Super League: 2009
