= Wei Kexing =

Chinese footballer

Personal information
- Full name: Wei Kexing
- Date of birth: 13 February 1963 (age 63)
- Place of birth: Qingdao, China
- Positions: Defender; midfielder

Youth career
- Beijing team

Senior career*
| Years | Team | Apps | (Gls) |
| 1985–1991 | Beijing team | | |
| 1991–1993 | Fujitsu SC | | |
| 1993–1994 | Happy Valley | | |
| 1994–1997 | Beijing Guoan | | |

International career
| 1985–1994 | China | 11 | (0) |

Managerial career
- 2000–2002: Beijing Guoan
- 2010: Beijing Guoan (interim)
Medal record
Men's football
Representing China
Asian Games
| Silver medal – second place | 1994 Hiroshima | Football |
University Games
| Bronze medal – third place | 1985 Kobe | Football |
- * Club domestic league appearances and goals as of 12 May 2018 (UTC)

Wei Kexing (simplified Chinese: 魏克兴; traditional Chinese: 魏克興; pinyin: Wèi Kèxīng; born 13 February 1963) is a Chinese former footballer who most recently was interim manager for Beijing Guoan in the Chinese Super League.

== Playing career ==
After progressing through the youth team at Beijing, Wei made his debut for the club in 1985. After playing for Japanese club Fujitsu SC and Hong Kong club Happy Valley for a total of two seasons, Wei returned to his native China to play for Beijing Guoan until his retirement in 1997.

On 29 January 1985, Wei scored for China in the Nehru Cup against Yugoslavia.

== Management career ==
Following Milovan Đorić leaving Beijing Guoan after just three games of the 2000 Jia-A League season, Wei took up the managerial role of the club until late 2002. On 21 September 2010, Wei was named interim manager of Beijing Guoan for the final seven games of the 2010 season, following the sacking of Hong Yuanshuo.

== Personal life ==
Wei is a member of the Chinese Communist Party.
