= Tang Pengju =

Chinese footballer

Tang Pengju 唐鹏举
Personal information
- Date of birth: January 12, 1957 (age 69)
- Place of birth: Xingping, China
- Position: Midfielder

Team information
- Current team: Guangzhou Pharmaceutical (assistant coach)

Senior career*
Years	Team	Apps	(Gls)
1974–?	Shaanxi Team		
?–1982	Beijing Budui		
1983–1987	Beijing Team		

Managerial career
- 1988–1994: Beijing Guoan
- 1996–1997: China National U-20 Team
- 1997–1998: Changchun Yatai
- 1999–2000: China Olympic National Team (assistant coach)
- 2000: China National U-20 Team (assistant coach)
- 2001: Xiamen Lanshi (assistant coach)
- 2002–2004: China Olympic National Team (assistant coach)
- 2004–2006: Changchun Yatai (assistant coach)
- 2007–: Guangzhou Pharmaceutical (assistant coach)
- * Club domestic league appearances and goals

Tang Pengju (Chinese: 唐鹏举; born January 12, 1957) is a retired Chinese football player. He is the assistant coach at China Super League side Guangzhou Pharmaceutical.

== Playing career ==
Pengju used to play for the Shaanxi Team, Beijing Budui, Beijing Team, and was regarded as one of the best right midfielders in China.

== Management career ==
After retiring Tang would soon move into management and despite his youth and inexperience his former club the Beijing Team decided to give him his first management position in 1988. One of his first assignments was to guide the club back into the top tier and he achieved this in the 1990 Chinese league season after the club won the division title. After an impressive season that saw the club finish third in their return into the top flight in the 1991 league season expectations would start to arise from the club. This would continue when the Chinese Football Association started to demand that the league become fully professional and Beijing became the countries first professional team after the CITIC Group took over the club. With significant investment from the owners and despite having Chinese internationals in Gao Hongbo, Cao Xiandong and Gao Feng Tang's authoritarian leadership could not get the best from his players and he left in 1994.

== Honours ==
=== Player ===
Beijing Team

- Chinese Jia-A League: 1984

=== Manager ===
Beijing Guoan

- Chinese Jia-B League: 1990
