= Andrés Olivas (footballer) =

Spanish footballer

Andrés Olivas Rubio
Personal information
- Date of birth: 17 March 1967 (age 59)
- Place of birth: Jaén, Spain
- Height: 1.94 m (6 ft 4 1/2 in)
- Position: Forward

Youth career
- Valencia

Senior career*
Years	Team	Apps	(Gls)
1988–1994	Levante	87	(17)
1989–1990	→ Teruel (loan)	34	(11)
1993–1994	→ Real Jaén (loan)	27	(8)
1994–1995	Ourense	19	(0)
1995–1996	Manlleu	38	(12)
1996–1997	Gimnàstic de Tarragona	29	(5)
1997–1998	Beijing Guoan		(19)
2001	Shanghai Zhongyuan Huili		(15)
Total		234+	(87)
- * Club domestic league appearances and goals

Andrés Olivas Rubio (born 17 March 1967), is a retired Spanish footballer who played as a forward.

== Club career ==
Andrés Olivas famously scored two goals in the 1997 Chinese Football Super Cup, including a 119th minute golden goal to secure victory against Dalian Wanda.

== Career statistics ==
=== Club ===
As of games played 1998.

Club	Season	League			Cup		Continental		Other		Total	
Club	Season	Division	Apps	Goals	Apps	Goals	Apps	Goals	Apps	Goals	Apps	Goals
Levante	1988–89	Segunda División B	2	0	0	0	–		0	0	2	0
Levante	1989–90	Segunda División	0	0	0	0	–		0	0	0	0
Levante	1990–91	Segunda División	16	1	0	0	–		0	0	16	1
Levante	1991–92	Segunda División B	33	6	0	0	–		0	0	33	6
Levante	1992–93	Segunda División B	36	10	3 (Note: Appearances in the King's Cup)	0	–		0	0	39	10
Levante	1993–94	Segunda División B	0	0	0	0	–		0	0	0	0
Levante	Total		87	17	3	0	–		0	0	90	17
Teruel (loan)	1989–90	Segunda División B	34	11	0	0	–		0	0	34	11
Real Jaén (loan)	1993–94	Segunda División B	27	8	2	0	–		6 (Note: Appearances in the Segunda División B play-offs)	1	35	9
Ourense	1994–95	Segunda División	19	0	2	0	–		0	0	21	0
Manlleu	1995–96	Segunda División B	38	12	2	0	–		0	0	40	12
Gimnàstic de Tarragona	1996–97	Segunda División B	29	5	2	0	–		0	0	31	5
Beijing Guoan	1997	Chinese Jia-A League	?	10	? (Note: Appearances in the Chinese FA Cup)	2	?	?	1 (Note: Appearances in the Chinese Football Super Cup)	2	1+	14
Beijing Guoan	1998	Chinese Jia-A League	?	9	?	4	?	?	?	?	?	13
Beijing Guoan	Total		?	19	?	6	?	?	1	2	?	27
Shanghai Zhongyuan Huili	2001	Chinese Jia-B League	?	15	?	?	–		?	?	?	15
Career total			238+	87	11+	6	?	?	7	3	256+	96
