= William Inganga =

Kenyan footballer

William Inganga is a former Kenyan professional footballer who played for Cerro Porteño in the Primera División Paraguaya and in the 1996 Copa Libertadores, making three appearances. He also represented the Kenya national team at international level, making one appearance during the 1994 FIFA World Cup qualifiers. His sole match came in the first round of qualifying, in a 4–0 away defeat to Guinea on 20 December 1992, played in Conakry.
