= Xie Feng (footballer) =

Chinese footballer and manager

Xie Feng 谢峰
Personal information
- Full name: Xie Feng
- Date of birth: 9 April 1966 (age 60)
- Place of birth: Shanghai, China
- Height: 1.82 m (5 ft 11 1/2 in)
- Positions: Right-back; striker

Senior career*
Years	Team	Apps	(Gls)
1988–1997	Beijing Guoan	80	(19)
1998–2001	Shenzhen Pingan	63	(8)
Total		143	(27)

International career
1996–2000	China	19	(0)

Managerial career
- 2006: Shenzhen Kingway (interim)
- 2009: Shenzhen Asia Travel (interim)
- 2014: Beijing Guoan (interim)
- 2016: Beijing Guoan (interim)
- 2017: Beijing Guoan (interim)
- 2019–2021: Hebei FC
- 2022: Beijing Guoan
- * Club domestic league appearances and goals

Xie Feng (simplified Chinese: 谢峰; traditional Chinese: 謝峰; pinyin: Xiè Fēng; born 9 April 1966) is a Chinese football coach and former footballer.

== Club career ==
Xie’s father, Xie Hongjun (Chinese: 谢鸿钧), is a retired footballer who played for Shanghai Team and the Chinese national team. His mother Zheng Yuru (Chinese: 郑玉茹) was a sprinter active in the 1950s. Xie Hongjun would move into coaching with the Beijing Youth Team while Xie Feng would progress through the organisation into the senior team by 1988. Initially when Xie Feng started his career at Beijing FC (later renamed Beijing Guoan), he was a striker whose his ability to run 100 metres in 11 seconds was considered a great asset. His speed would be highlighted when he scored against both A.C. Milan and Arsenal in friendlies for Beijing Guoan in 1994 and 1995 respectively.

Xie would be converted to a right-back by head coach Jin Zhiyang to accommodate the striker Gao Hongbo. The move would be a huge success for Xie and he would go on to win the 1996 and 1997 Chinese FA Cup with the club. After spending his whole career in Beijing, Xie joined another top tier club in Shenzhen Pingan where he remained until at the end of the 2001 league season where he spent the whole campaign recovering from injury before deciding to retire from playing and take the advice of the club's Head Zhu Guanghu and move into coaching.

== Management career ==
After retiring as a player at Shenzhen Pingan, Xie assumed the position of assistant manager at the club, temporarily being named interim manager on two separate occasions.

In the 2010 Chinese Super League season, Xie was named assistant manager of Shaanxi Chanba.

On 19 May 2016, Alberto Zaccheroni was sacked as Beijing Guoan manager, with Xie being appointed interim manager until a replacement was hired.

On 15 May 2019, following the sacking of Chris Coleman, Hebei China Fortune announced that Xie would manage the club on an interim basis.

On 14 January 2022, Xie was named as the head coach of Beijing Guoan. On 12 August 2022, Xie resigned because of personal reason.

On 29 January 2026, Xie was given a lifetime ban for match-fixing by the Chinese Football Association.

== Honours ==
=== Player ===
Beijing Guoan

- Jia B League: 1990
- Chinese FA Cup: 1996, 1997
