= Choi Eun-taek =

South Korean footballer (1938–2007)

Choi Eun-taek 최은택
Personal information
- Full name: Choi Eun-taek
- Date of birth: 1938
- Place of birth: Chaeryŏng, Kōkai-dō (Hwanghae Province), Korea, Empire of Japan
- Date of death: 2007 (aged 68–69)
- Place of death: Seoul, Korea Republic
- Position: Midfielder

Youth career
- Hanyang University

Senior career*
Years	Team	Apps	(Gls)
- Gendarmerie Office
- Korea Tungsten Company FC

International career
- South Korea U-20
- South Korea B

Managerial career
- 1967–1971: Hanyang University
- 1972: South Korea U-20
- 1973–1974: South Korea (coach)
- 1979–1980: South Korea (coach)
- 1982: South Korea
- 1985–1986: POSCO Atoms
- 1997–1998: Yanbian FC
- * Club domestic league appearances and goals

Choi Eun-taek (Korean: 최은택; Hanja: 崔殷澤; 1938 – February 5, 2007) was a South Korean football manager and former football player.
