= Casiano Delvalle =

Paraguayan footballer (born 1970)

Personal information
- Full name: Casiano Wilberto Delvalle Ruiz
- Date of birth: 13 August 1970 (age 56)
- Place of birth: Lambaré, Paraguay
- Height: 1.78 m (5 ft 10 in)
- Position: Striker

Senior career*
Years	Team	Apps	(Gls)
1990–1991	Sport Colombia	?	(?)
1992–1993	Cerro Corá	?	(?)
1994	Olimpia Asunción	?	(?)
1995	Cerro Corá	?	(?)
1996–1997	Unión Española	?	(?)
1997	Olimpia Asunción	?	(?)
1997–1998	Beijing Guoan	21	(6)
1998	Sportivo Luqueño	?	(?)
1999	Beijing Guoan	12	(9)
2000–2001	Shandong Luneng	43	(21)
2002–2003	Beijing Guoan	22	(11)
2004	Olimpia Asunción	1	(0)
2005	Sport Colombia	?	(15)
2005	Shonan Bellmare	11	(0)
2007	Guangzhou Pharmaceutical	7	(2)

International career
1995	Paraguay	3	(0)
- * Club domestic league appearances and goals as of March 2010

Casiano Wilberto Delvalle Ruiz (Spanish pronunciation: [kaˈsjano ðelˈβaʎe]; (Note: In isolation, Delvalle is pronounced [delˈβaʎe].) born 13 August 1970) is a Paraguayan former footballer who played as a striker.

Throughout his career he played for several Paraguayan and Asian teams, most specifically from China and Japan. Delvalle was called for the Paraguay national football team during 1995 for some matches, most of them, friendlies.

Highlights of his career include winning the Chinese Football Association Golden Boot in 2000 and being the top-scorer in the 2005 Paraguayan Paraguayan second division while playing for Sport Colombia.

== Honours ==
Olimpia Asunción

- Primera División: 1997

Beijing Guoan

- Chinese FA Cup: 1997, 2003
