= Deng Lejun =

Chinese footballer

Deng Lejun 邓乐军
Personal information
- Full name: Deng Lejun
- Date of birth: 18 September 1971 (age 55)
- Place of birth: Beijing, China
- Height: 1.72 m (5 ft 7 1/2 in)
- Position: Midfielder

Youth career
- 1985–1990: Beijing Team

Senior career*
Years	Team	Apps	(Gls)
1994–1997	Beijing Guoan	61	(10)
1998–1999	Shandong Luneng	30	(7)
Total		91	(17)

International career
1991	China U17		
Medal record
Men's football
Representing China
East Asian Games
Bronze medal – third place	1993 Shanghai	Football
- * Club domestic league appearances and goals as of 17:21, 26 February 2017 (UTC)

Deng Lejun (simplified Chinese: 邓乐军; traditional Chinese: 鄧樂軍; pinyin: Dèng Lèjūn; born 18 September 1971) is a former professional footballer for several Chinese Super League teams and is currently a golfer.

Deng joined the Beijing football team in 1991, the same year he made the all-star team in FIFA U-17 World Cup. The Beijing team later became professional club Beijing Guoan in 1994. As a member of Beijing Guoan, Deng won the 1995 runner up in the Chinese Jia-A League and won the Chinese FA Cup twice. In 1998, Deng was interested in moving to Shenzhen Pingan but was forced to transfer to Shandong Luneng. At Shandong, Deng became the team captain and won the league championship and another FA Cup, however he lost his start position due to team politics after Slobodan Santrač began managing the team. In 2000, Deng decide to retire from football as he could not pass the 12-minute run test set up by the Chinese FA.

== Style of play ==
Deng is limited in physical strength but is good at anticipation and vision. He won the nickname "Little Zhuge" for his wise passing. His teammate Zhou Ning once said he would be in Bundesliga if he can combine Deng's brain with his body.
