= Bulayima Mukuayanzo =

Congolese footballer

Personal information
- Date of birth: 26 January 1969 (age 57)
- Position: Goalkeeper

Senior career*
Years	Team	Apps	(Gls)
1986–1993	Daring Club Motema Pembe		
1993–1994	Feyenoord		
1994–1995	RBC Roosendaal		
1997–1999	Yanbian / Jilin Aodong		

International career
- DR Congo
- * Club domestic league appearances and goals

Bulayima Mukuayanzo (born 26 January 1969) is a retired Congolese football goalkeeper. He was a squad member at the 1994 Africa Cup of Nations.
