= Jin Zhiyang =

Chinese footballer and coach

Jin Zhiyang 金志扬
Personal information
- Full name: Jin Zhiyang
- Date of birth: January 10, 1944 (age 82)
- Place of birth: Beijing, China
- Height: 1.72 m (5 ft 8 in)

Senior career*
| Years | Team | Apps | (Gls) |
| 1960–1973 | Beijing | ? | (?) |

Managerial career
- 1974–1976: Tibet
- 1995–1997: Beijing Guo'an
- 1997–1998: China (Assistant)
- 1999–2000: Tianjin Teda
- 2000: China (Caretaker)
- 2003–2007: Beijing Institute of Technology FC
- * Club domestic league appearances and goals as of May 7, 2010

Jin Zhiyang (Chinese: 金志扬, born January 10, 1944) is a Chinese football coach and a former player. He is mainly noted within China for his loyal service towards Beijing as both a successful player and then later as a coach for the team where his greatest achievements was when he managed the team to two Chinese FA Cup titles in the 1996 and then 1997 league seasons. He has also managed several other teams such as Tibet, Tianjin Teda and China on a caretaker basis, while his last senior coaching position was with Beijing Institute of Technology FC.

== Playing career ==
Jin Zhiyang started his playing career with the Beijing youth team and subsequently the senior Beijing team. His greatest achievement came when he won the national league title in 1973 with the Beijing team. He would retire shortly afterwards to begin his management career.

== Management career ==
After he retired from football Jin Zhiyang would begin coaching for the Beijing team before he was offered a chance to become the Head coach of Tibet in 1974. After staying with them for two seasons he would return to Beijing where he was offered the chance to coach the youth team and then the reserves until March 1985 when the club pushed for professionalism within the team and moved Jin to Germany to study professional coaching before returning to Beijing where he continued studying before finally achieving his coaching badges. After the previous Head coach Tang Pengju had a disappointing season with Beijing, Jin was promoted as the club's manager at the beginning of the 1995 league season and would immediately transform the team into genuine title contenders, achieving a runners-up position at the end of the season. While he couldn't go on to win the league title he would go on to win the 1996 and then 1997 Chinese FA Cup titles.

Near the end of the 1997 Chinese league season the Chinese Football Association would hire a foreign coach in Bob Houghton to manage the Chinese football team and Jin Zhiyang was brought in as an assistant coach to help him. This lasted until December 2008 when recently promoted top tier side Tianjin Teda F.C. offered him their head coach position, taking this opportunity to return into management he would lead them at the start of the 1999 league season to a respectable seventh-place position at the end of the season. In 2000 Jin would return to the Chinese football team as their manager, but on only on a part-time caretaker basis to aid the team prepare for some important 2000 AFC Asian Cup qualification games. When he returned to Tianjin Teda F.C. he would once again achieve similar mid-table results from the previous season and leave the club at the end year.

== Honours ==
=== Player ===
Beijing

- Chinese Jia-A League: 1973

=== Manager ===
Beijing Guoan

- Chinese FA Cup: 1996, 1997

Beijing Institute of Technology FC

- China League Two: 2006

| Preceded by Tang Pengju | Beijing Guo'an manager 1995–1997 | Succeeded by Shen Xiangfu |
| Preceded by Osvaldo Giménez | Tianjin Taida manager 1998–2000 | Succeeded by Nelson Agresta |
