= Valeri Kleymyonov =

Russian footballer

Valery Kleymyonov Валерий Клеймёнов
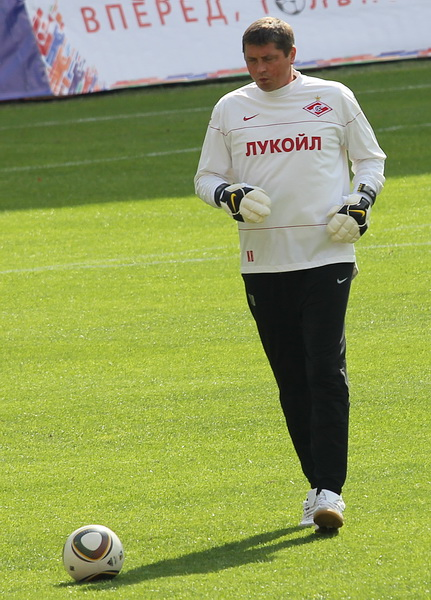

Personal information
- Full name: Valery Semyonovich Kleymyonov
- Date of birth: 10 September 1965 (age 61)
- Place of birth: Shchyokino, Tula Oblast, Russian SFSR, Soviet Union
- Height: 1.90 m (6 ft 3 in)
- Position: Goalkeeper

Team information
- Current team: Pari NN (goalkeeping coach)

Youth career
- Kord Shchyokino

Senior career*
Years	Team	Apps	(Gls)
1982–1983	Kord Shchyokino		
1983–1984	Arsenal Tula	21	(0)
1985–1986	Iskra Smolensk	42	(0)
1987–1991	Rotor Volgograd	138	(0)
1992–1994	Dynamo Moscow	46	(0)
1994	Maccabi Herzliya	3	(0)
1995–1997	Dynamo Moscow	18	(0)
1997–1998	Shanghai Shenhua	17	(0)
1998	Saturn Ramenskoye	2	(0)
1999	Shinnik Yaroslavl	6	(0)
1999–2001	Arsenal Tula	51	(0)
2002	Khimki	0	(0)

International career
1992	CIS	2	(0)

Managerial career
- 2003–2005: Khimki (goalkeeper coach)
- 2003–2004: Russia U-21 (goalkeeper coach)
- 2005: Dynamo Moscow (assistant)
- 2005: Tom Tomsk (goalkeeper coach)
- 2006: Khimki (goalkeeper coach)
- 2007: Lokomotiv Moscow (goalkeeper coach)
- 2008: MVD Rossii (goalkeeper coach)
- 2009: Spartak-2 Moscow (goalkeeper coach)
- 2010–2014: Spartak Moscow (goalkeeper coach)
- 2014–2016: Rubin Kazan (goalkeeper coach)
- 2017–2019: Yenisey (goalkeeper coach)
- 2020–: Pari NN (goalkeeper coach)
- * Club domestic league appearances and goals

Valery Semyonovich Kleymyonov (Russian: Валерий Семёнович Клеймёнов; born 10 September 1965) is a Russian football coach and a former player. He works as a goalkeeping coach for Pari NN.

== International career ==
Kleymyonov played two games for CIS, making his debut on January 29, 1992 in a friendly against El Salvador.

== Honours ==
Dynamo Moscow

- Russian Cup: 1995

Shanghai Shenhua

- Chinese FA Cup: 1998
