= Cao Xiandong =

Chinese footballer and coach

Cao Xiandong 曹限东
Personal information
- Date of birth: 19 August 1968 (age 58)
- Place of birth: Beijing, China
- Position: Midfielder

Senior career*
Years	Team	Apps	(Gls)
1990–1997	Beijing Guoan		
1998	Qingdao Etsong Hainiu	26	(6)
1999–2000	Beijing Kuanli	3	(0)

International career^{‡}
1985	China Under-17	4	(1)
1992–1997	China	14	(2)

Managerial career
- 2007: Beijing BIT (assist)
- 2008–2009: Beijing BIT
- 2010: Beijing Baxy&Shengshi
- 2011: Beijing Baxy
- 2012: Beijing Baxy
Medal record
Men's football
Representing China
Asian Games
Silver medal – second place	1994 Hiroshima	Football
- * Club domestic league appearances and goals as of 16:00, 8 Aug 2012 (UTC) ‡ National team caps and goals as of 16:00, 8 Aug 2012 (UTC)

Cao Xiandong (Chinese: 曹限东; born 19 August 1968) is a Chinese football coach and a former international midfielder. In his career, he represented Beijing Guoan where he won two Chinese FA Cups along with Qingdao Etsong Hainiu and Beijing Kuanli. Internationally he played for the Chinese team that took part in the 1996 Asian Cup. Since retiring he moved into assistant management and then gained his first head coaching position with Beijing BIT.

== Playing career ==
Cao Xiandong was considered a talented midfielder and was soon called up to the Chinese under-17 team that took part in the 1985 FIFA U-16 World Championship where China were knocked out in the quarter-finals to West Germany in a 4-2 defeat. He eventually went on to graduate to the senior team of Beijing and once he started to become a regular he was given his debut for his country in a friendly against North Korea on August 31, 1992 in a 0-0 draw. He soon established himself as a regular for the national team and went to the Football at the 1994 Asian Games where China came runners-up to Uzbekistan in a 4-2 defeat in the final. Cao Xiandong soon gained his first piece of silverware when Beijing won the 1996 and then 1997 Chinese FA Cup. After this success Cao Xiandong decided to join Qingdao Etsong Hainiu for a brief period before joining second-tier club Beijing Kuanli in 1999 where he soon ended his playing career with them.

== Career statistics ==
=== International goals ===
Scores and results list China's goal tally first.

No	Date	Venue	Opponent	Score	Result	Competition
1.	3 October 1994	Hiroshima Stadium, Hiroshima, Japan	Yemen	4–0	4–0	1994 Asian Games
2.	11 October 1994	Bingo Athletic Stadium, Onomichi, Japan	Saudi Arabia	1–0	2–0	1994 Asian Games

== Honours ==
=== Player ===
==== Club ====
Beijing Guoan

- Chinese FA Cup: 1996, 1997

==== International ====
China

- Asian Games: 1994 (Silver)
