= Jorge Campos (Paraguayan footballer) =

Paraguayan footballer (born 1970)

Jorge Luis Campos
Personal information
- Full name: Jorge Luis Campos Velázquez
- Date of birth: 11 August 1970 (age 56)
- Place of birth: Asunción, Paraguay
- Height: 1.72 m (5 ft 8 in)
- Position: Attacking midfielder

Senior career*
Years	Team	Apps	(Gls)
1992–1997	Olimpia		
1997–1998	Beijing Guo'an	39	(9)
1998–1999	Cruz Azul	9	(1)
2000–2001	Cerro Porteño	50	(8)
2002–2003	Universidad Católica	42	(5)
2003–2004	Quilmes	4	(0)
2004–2005	Libertad	6	(2)
2005	Nacional	12	(3)
2005–2006	Sportivo Luqueño	16	(2)

International career
1992	Paraguay U23		
1995–2004	Paraguay	46	(6)
- * Club domestic league appearances and goals

Jorge Luis Campos Velázquez (Spanish pronunciation: [ˈxoɾxe ˈlwis ˈkampos]; born 11 August 1970) is a Paraguayan former professional footballer who played as an attacking midfielder.

== Club career ==
Besides Paraguay, Campos played for Beijing Guo'an in China, Cruz Azul in Mexico, Universidad Católica in Chile and Quilmes in Argentina.

== International career ==
Campos made his international debut for the Paraguay national football team on 14 May 1995 in a Copa Paz de Chico match against Bolivia (1–1). He obtained a total number of 46 international caps, scoring six goals for the national side. He represented Paraguay at the World Cups in 1998 and 2002.

== Career statistics ==
=== International ===
Appearances and goals by national team and year
National team	Year	Apps	Goals
Paraguay	1995	11	2
Paraguay	1996	2	0
Paraguay	1997	1	0
Paraguay	1998	7	1
Paraguay	1999	–	
Paraguay	2000	5	1
Paraguay	2001	1	0
Paraguay	2002	8	1
Paraguay	2003	8	1
Paraguay	2004	1	0
Total		44	6

Scores and results list Paraguay's goal tally first, score column indicates score after each Campos goal.

List of international goals scored by Jorge Campos
No.	Date	Venue	Opponent	Score	Result	Competition
1	22 June 1995	Estadio Nacional, Santiago, Chile	New Zealand	1–0	3–2	1995 Copa Centenario
2	22 June 1995	Estadio Nacional, Santiago, Chile	New Zealand	3–1	3–2	1995 Copa Centenario
3	1 June 1998	Philips Stadion, Eindhoven, Netherlands	Netherlands	1–0	1–5	Friendly
4	18 July 2000	Estadio Defensores del Chaco, Asunción, Paraguay	Brazil	2–1	2–1	2002 FIFA World Cup qualification
5	12 June 2002	Jeju World Cup Stadium, Seogwipo, South Korea	Slovenia	2–1	3–1	2002 FIFA World Cup
6	20 August 2003	Rommel Fernández Stadium, Panama City, Panama	Panama	1–0	2–1	Friendly

== Honours ==
=== Club ===
Universidad Católica

- Primera División de Chile (1): 2002 Apertura
