= Beijing Guoan F.C. =

Chinese professional football club

Beijing Guoan 北京国安
- Full name: Beijing Guoan Football Club 北京国安足球俱乐部
- Nicknames: 御林军 (The Imperial Guards)
- Founded: 29 December 1992; 33 years ago
- Ground: Workers' Stadium
- Capacity: 68,000
- Owner: Sinobo Group
- Chairman: Zhou Jinhui
- Head coach: Nick Montgomery
- League: Chinese Super League
- 2026: Chinese Super League, 3rd of 16
- Website: www.fcguoan.com
Home colours	Away colours

Beijing Guoan
- Simplified Chinese: 北京国安
- Traditional Chinese: 北京國安
Transcriptions
Standard Mandarin
- Hanyu Pinyin: Běijīng Guó'ān
- Gwoyeu Romatzyh: Beeijing Gwoan
- Wade–Giles: Pei3-ch'ing1 Kuo2-an1
- IPA: [pèɪtɕíŋ kwǒˈán]

Beijing Guoan Football Club (Chinese: 北京国安足球俱乐部; pinyin: Běijīng Guó'ān Zúqiú Jùlèbù), known in AFC competitions as Beijing FC, is a Chinese professional football club based in Beijing, that competes in the Chinese Super League, the top tier of Chinese football. Beijing Guoan plays its home matches at the Workers' Stadium, located within Chaoyang District. In early 2021, the shareholders changed from the real estate company Sinobo Group (64%) and CITIC Limited (36%) of CITIC Group to form Sinobo Group (100%). Beijing Guoan is one of the four clubs to have never been relegated from the Chinese top-flight since the Chinese Super League's foundation in 2004.

The club's predecessor was called Beijing Football Club and they predominantly played in the top tier, where they won several domestic league and cup titles. On 29 December 1992, the club was recognized to become a completely professional football club, making them one of the founding members of the first fully professional top-tier league in China. Since then, they have gone on to win their first ever professional league title in the 2009 league season as well as the 1996, 1997, 2003, 2018 and 2025 Chinese FA Cup.

According to Forbes, Guoan was the second most valuable football team in China, with a team value of US$167 million, and an estimated revenue of US$30 million in 2015. According to the disclosure of CITIC Pacific, the club revenue was CN¥244 million in the 2013 season. In the 2015 season, the sponsorship from CITIC Securities was CN¥25 million.

== History ==
=== 1950s–1992: Early club era ===
Beijing Guoan logo used between 1992 and 1994

The club's first incarnation came in 1951 when the local government sports body decided to take part in China's first fully national football league tournament. To prepare for the competition they participated in the 1951 North China Football Competition where they officially unveiled the team for the first time on 28 October 1951. After this tournament the relevant parties decided to form a football team with the best players from Beijing and Tianjin to create the North China team who were unveiled on 1 December 1951 for the start of the national football league tournament. The team name was taken from the football team in the 1910 multi-sport event Chinese National Games that also represented the same regions. The team ended up finishing fourth in their debut season and with the football league gradually expanding, the players from Beijing and Tianjin were allowed to separate and the local Beijing government sports body was allowed to reform the club as Beijing Football Club in 1955. The club made its debut appearance in the 1956 season and wore an all-white home kit and all-red away strip. In the 1956 campaign, the club was also allowed to enter their youth team called Beijing Youth B, who actually went on to win the league title while Beijing came sixth that season. The club strengthened their hold on the following seasons when they won the 1957 and 1958 league titles. With these results, the club had become a major force within Chinese football, and with the club's youth team still participating within the top tier, there was a constant supply of players coming into the team to fight for places. Being China's capital city and for their success on the field, the club had become a feeder team for the Chinese national team. This often saw the club unable to complete a full championship schedule and the youth team were often used to represent the club, which did little to diminish Beijing football and actually resulted in the youth team winning the 1963 championship for the second time, showing the strength in depth of the region of Beijing football until 1966, when the Chinese Cultural Revolution halted football within the country. When football returned to China, Beijing won the 1973 league title in the newly re-established footballing league. While Beijing once again re-established themselves as major title contenders, they did not win any major titles until 1982, where they won the league title, followed by the 1984 league title and the 1985 Chinese FA Cup title. After this period, Beijing's performances seemed to have declined and were relegated for the first time in their history to the second tier at the end of the 1988 season. However, their time within the second tier was short-lived and they won the division title and promotion to the first tier at the end of the 1990 season. In total, Beijing had won the league title five times during the old Chinese National Football League era before the club was given full professionalism in 1992.

=== 1992–1999: Professionalism ===
Beijing Guoan logo used between 1996 and 2001

Beijing Guoan was formed on 29 December 1992, as a result of the Chinese football reform, which was the Chinese Football Association's attempt to professionalize the Chinese football league system. The club was set up by CITIC Guoan of CITIC Group, a state-owned enterprise of China, and the Beijing Municipal Sports Committee. The club then took part in the 1994 Chinese Jia-A League season, making them a founding member of the first fully professional top-tier league in China and changed their home colors to green to symbolize the change. In their first professional season, Beijing finished in a disappointing eighth out of twelve teams and club manager Tang Pengju was relieved of his duties. The club brought in Jin Zhiyang to manage them the following season and the results under his reign improved enough for them to finish the 1995 campaign in the runner-up position. The following season, Jin Zhiyang lead Beijing to their first professional trophy when they beat Jinan Taishan Jiangjun 4–1 to win the 1996 Chinese FA Cup. Jin Zhiyang was able to retain the Cup the following year with a 2–1 victory against Shanghai Shenhua, which impressed the Chinese FA, who lured him away from Beijing when they offered him a position with the Chinese national team. Assistant coach Shen Xiangfu stepped into the managerial role and in his debut season, he guided the club to third within the league. However, in his second season the team slid down to sixth and he left the club.

=== 2000–2009: Foreign influences and first league title ===
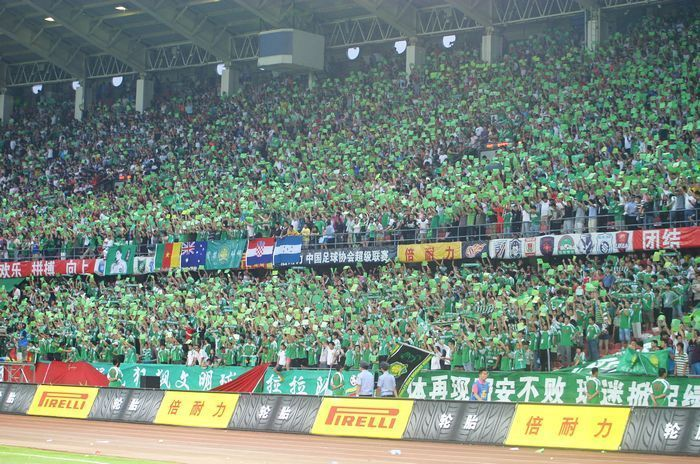
Beijing Guoan supporters at a Chinese Super League match in June 2009

Beijing Guoan logo used between 2002 and 2021

Serbian Milovan Đorić became Beijing's first foray with a foreign manager when he joined the club at the start of the 2000 league season. His reign was exceptionally short-lived after he lost his first three games of the season before he was replaced with native coach Wei Kexing. At the start of the 2002 league season, Beijing hired their second foreign manager in Ljupko Petrović. Foreign influences continued in 2003, when the club signed a three-year endorsement contract with jointly owned South Korean company Beijing Hyundai, which resulted in the club changing its name to Beijing Hyundai to accommodate this. In 2005, Spanish football club Real Madrid went into negotiations with Beijing on a football development project. At the start of the 2007 league season, two-time Chinese FA Cup winner with Chongqing Lifan and Qingdao Beilaite, Lee Jang-soo, was hired as the team's manager. The South Korean manager, in his debut season, guided the club to second within the league. By the 2009 league season, the club had returned to the Workers Stadium (after it had been in renovation for the 2008 Summer Olympics) under Lee Jang-soo's helm. It looked as if the club would be winning its first professional league title until a 2–0 defeat from Changchun Yatai on 15 September 2009, which saw the club slip to third place and Lee Jang-soo was unscrupulously fired with seven games remaining. Former Beijing player Hong Yuanshuo was immediately brought into the team and on the final day of the season, Beijing thrashed Hangzhou Greentown 4–0 to clinch the 2009 league championship.

=== 2010–present ===
In 2026, Beijing started the 2026 Chinese Super League season with five points deducted for violation of sports ethics and loss of sportsmanship, engaging in improper transactions to seek illegitimate benefits. The club issued a defiant statement on its social media account which read, "Heaven sees all! (Chinese: 人在做，天在看！头顶三尺有神明!)", without acknowledging or admitting to any wrongdoing.

On 1 March 2026, Beijing Guoan won the Chinese FA Super Cup, defeating Shanghai Port 2–0 at the Nanjing Olympic Sports Centre. It was the club's third Super Cup title.

== Ownership ==
Despite being founded by CITIC Guoan Group, the stake of the football club was held by another subsidiary, CITIC Corp., Ltd. (Chinese: 中国中信股份有限公司) of CITIC Group, a Beijing-incorporated SPV, for a possible listing in mainland China since 2012. (CITIC Group invited other investors to purchase the new shares of CITIC Guoan Group in 2014, making the company no longer a subsidiary of CITIC Group). In 2014, CITIC Group floated, by backdoor listing, most of their assets to their Hong Kong-based subsidiary CITIC Pacific (renaming it to CITIC Limited), including the entire share capital of "CITIC Corp.", thus the stake of the football club was indirectly floated in a stock exchange.

On 27 December 2016, real estate company Sinobo Group participated in the capital increase of the club for a reported 64% stake, which was finalised on 10 January 2017, making them the largest shareholder. According to a Chinese Government database, the share capital of the club had increased from CN¥75 million to CN¥208.33 million, making Sinobo Group own a 64.00% stake with CN¥133.33 million par value and undisclosed share premium. The club was also renamed to Beijing Sinobo Guoan F.C. Co., Ltd.

== Name history ==
- 1956: Beijing Physical Education Normal University 北京体院队
- 1957–1960: Beijing 北京队
- 1961–1964: Beijing Youth 北京青年队
- 1965–1990: Beijing 北京队
- 1991: Beijing Shenzhou 北京神州队
- 1992: Beijing 北京队
- 1993–2002: Beijing Guoan 北京国安队
- 2003–2005: Beijing Hyundai 北京现代队
- 2006–2015: Beijing Guoan 北京国安队
- 2016: Beijing Guoan LeEco 北京国安乐视队
- 2017–2020: Beijing Sinobo Guoan 北京中赫国安队
- 2021–: Beijing Guoan 北京国安队

== Stadiums ==
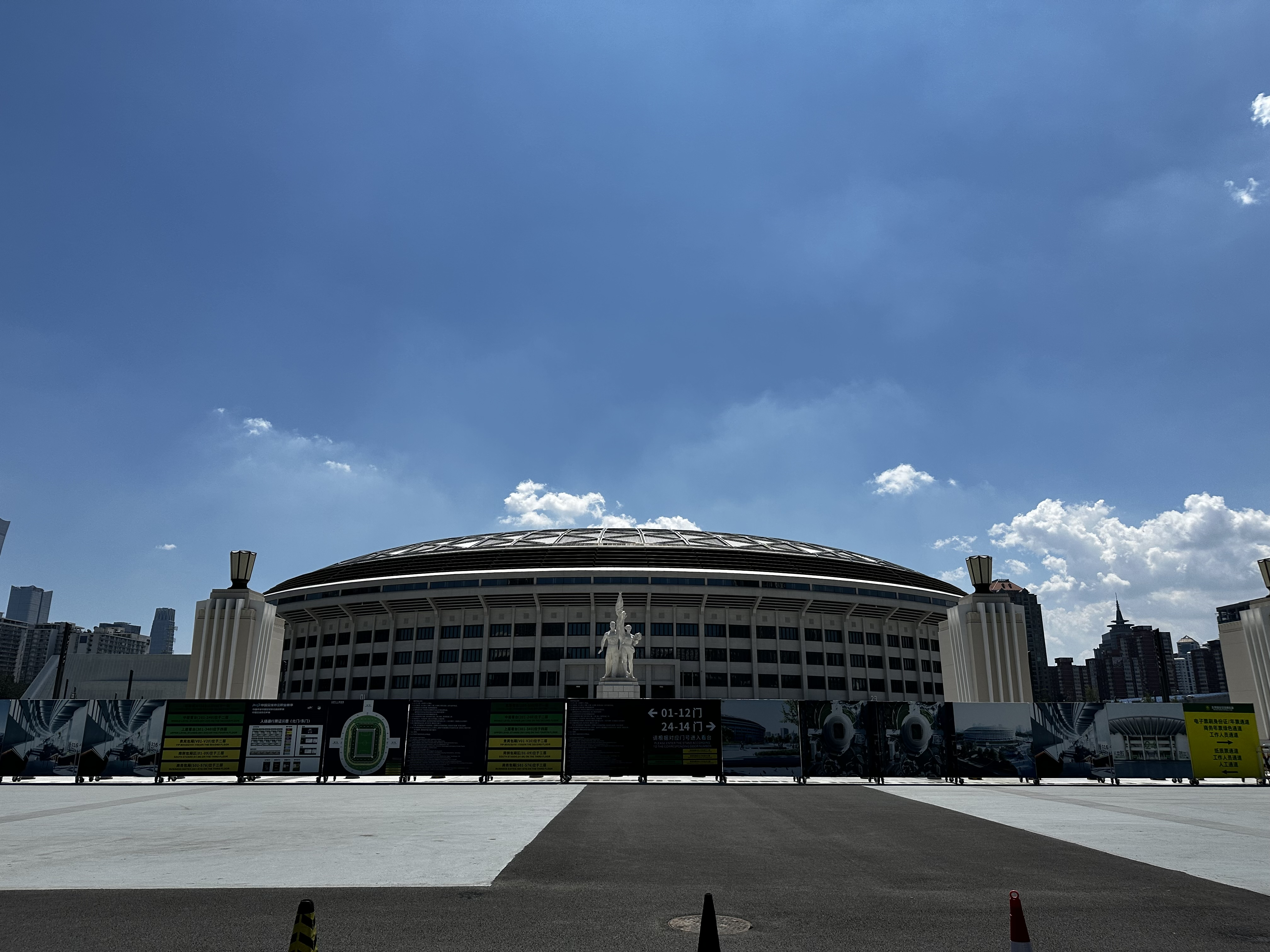
Workers' Stadium, a stadium rebuilt on the site of the original Workers' Stadium and home ground of Beijing Guoan since 2023

Five stadiums in four sites have been used as the home ground of Beijing Guoan since 1994:

- Xiannongtan Stadium (1994–1995)
- Workers' Stadium (1996–2005, 2009–2019)
- Beijing Fengtai Stadium (2006–2008)
- Rizhao International Football Center in Rizhao, Shandong (2022)
- Workers' Stadium (2023–present)

== Kits ==
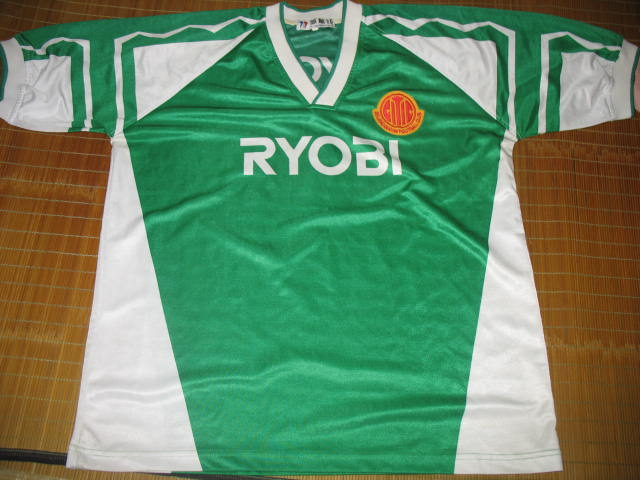
1995–1996 Kits

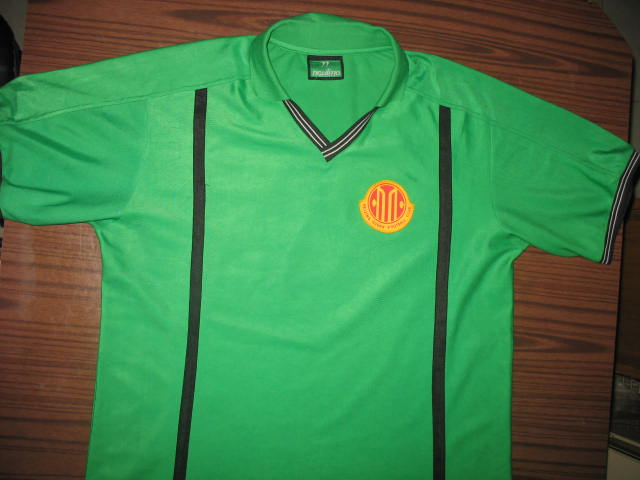
2002–2003 Kits

=== Kit suppliers and shirt sponsors ===
- Shirt sponsors only include China Super League and AFC Champions League.
- From 2011, all clubs in the Chinese Super League began wearing Nike kits.

Period	Kit supplier	Shirt sponsor
1993	(England) Umbro	
1994	(England) Umbro	
1995	(United States) Nike	Ryobi
1996	(United States) Nike	Ryobi
1997	(United States) Nike	Ryobi
1998	(United States) Nike	Ryobi
1999	(United States) Nike	Ryobi
2000	(United States) Nike	中信国安
2001	(United States) Nike	华友通信
2002	(United States) Nike	京华时报
2003	(United States) Nike	SONATA
2004	(United States) Nike	北京现代
2005	(United States) Nike	北京现代
2006	(Germany) Adidas	北京现代 (CSL rounds 1–4); No sponsor (CSL rounds 5–28)
2007	(Germany) Adidas	中信银行
2008	(Germany) Adidas	中信银行 (CSL); BBVA (ACL)
2009	(Germany) Adidas	中信银行 (CSL); BBVA (ACL)
2010	(United States) Nike	中信银行 (CSL); BBVA (ACL)
2011	(United States) Nike	中信银行 (CSL)
2012	(United States) Nike	中信银行 (CSL); BBVA (ACL)
2013	(United States) Nike	中信银行 (CSL 1st half of season) 华泰汽车 (CSL 2nd half of season); BBVA (ACL)
2014	(United States) Nike	警视媒体 (CSL) 华泰汽车 (ACL play-off) 中信银行 (ACL group stage)
2015	(United States) Nike	中信证券 (CSL) 中信银行 (ACL)
2016	(United States) Nike	中信证券
2017	(United States) Nike	中信证券
2018	(United States) Nike	中赫集团
2019	(United States) Nike	中赫集团
2020	(United States) Nike	中赫集团 (CSL, ACL rounds 2–6, ACL knockouts) 武汉加油 (ACL round 1)
2021	(United States) Nike	中赫集团
2022	(United States) Nike	中赫集团
2023	(United States) Nike	JD.com
2024	(United States) Nike	JD.com
2025	(United States) Nike	JD.com
2026	(United States) Nike	中赫

== Rivalries ==
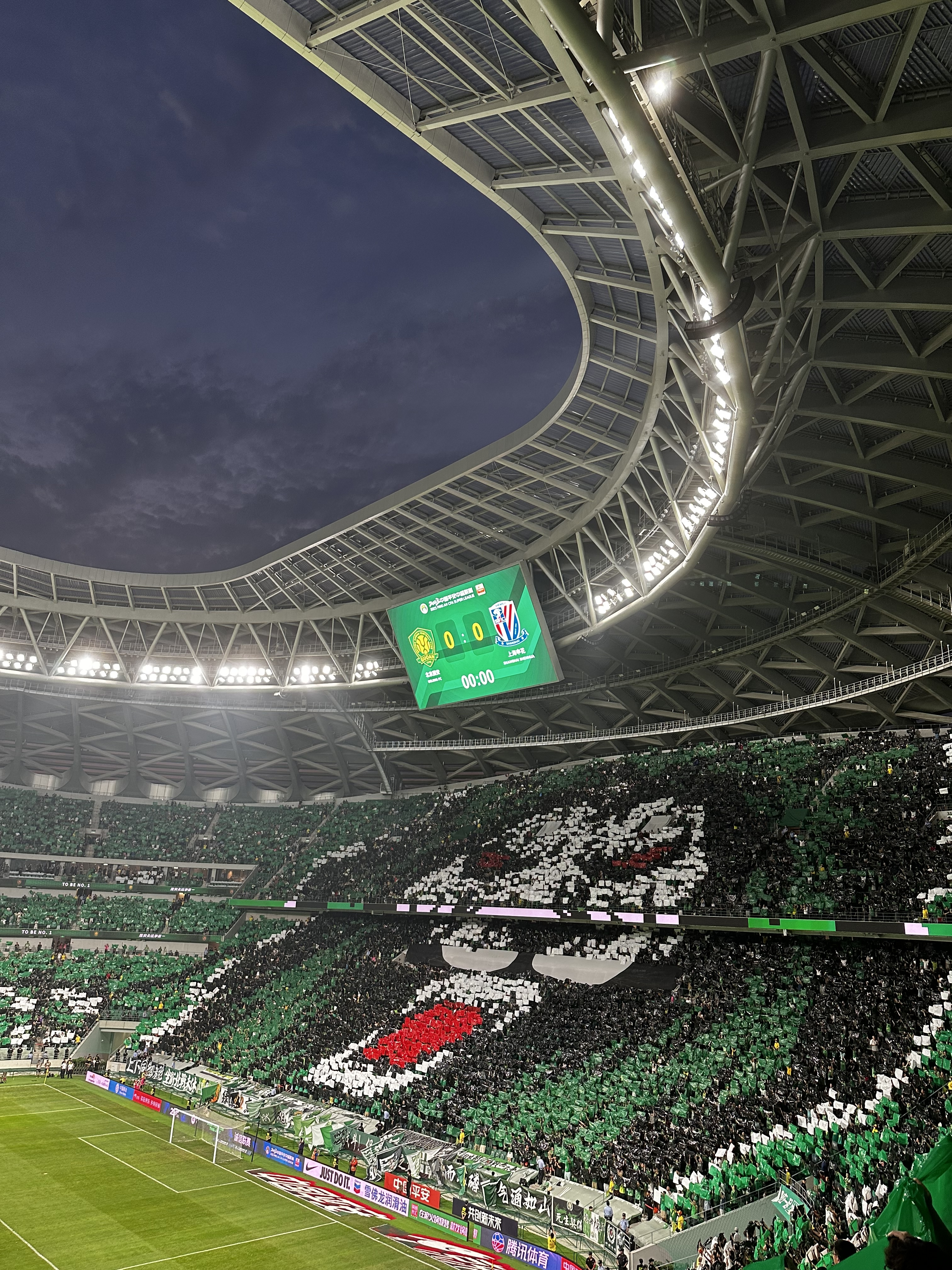
Tifo of a roaring lion in the Jing-Hu derby between Beijing Guoan and Shanghai Shenhua at the Workers' Stadium

Beijing Guoan's fiercest and oldest rivalry is against Shanghai Shenhua and is often referred to as the Jing-Hu derby, or the rivalry between Beijing and Shanghai. The rivalry with Shenhua is viewed as a manifestation of the rivalry that exists between the cities which are the most important for the nation, as one is the center of government while the other is the financial centre. With each club being able to claim an extensive history spanning successful periods, direct competition for silverware, however, rarely coincided until the 1997 league season. With Shenhua having won the 1995 league title and Beijing having won the 1996 Chinese FA Cup, both teams looked as if they had the pedigree to win silverware that season and on 20 July 1997, in a vital league game, Beijing thrashed Shenhua 9–1 at the Workers' Stadium in Beijing. It was Beijing's largest victory and Shenhua's greatest defeat ever recorded. Soon after that match, both teams met again in the 1997 FA Cup final, which saw Beijing win the cup. Between 2010 and 2024, Beijing Guoan held a record of twelve straight wins over Shanghai Shenhua at the Workers' Stadium, Beijing Guoan's home ground.

Beijing Guoan also has a long rivalry with Shandong-based Shandong Taishan, in which they compete in the Jing–Lu rivalry. Another team which Beijing Guoan have played throughout its entire professional history, Beijing, as of 2026, have a negative overall record against Shandong Taishan by a margin of ten wins.

The Jing-Jin derby is a local and long-standing derby between Beijing Guoan and neighboring Tianjin Jinmen Tiger. Both teams can trace their histories to the North China team before it split to form the Beijing Football Club and Tianjin Football Club. Since then, both clubs have predominantly remained within the top tier of Chinese football, providing a constant rivalry fixture which has led to intense matches that have spilled out away from the stadiums and onto the streets that have led to property destruction as well as further intensifying their relationship.

== Current squad ==
=== First team ===
As of 31 July 2026

Note: Flags indicate national team as defined under FIFA eligibility rules; some limited exceptions apply. Players may hold more than one non-FIFA nationality.

No.	Pos.	Nation	Player
2	DF	CHN	Wu Shaocong
3	DF	CHN	He Yupeng
4	DF	CHN	Li Lei
5	DF	POR	Guilherme Ramos
6	MF	CHN	Chi Zhongguo
7	MF	CHN	Sai Erjini'ao (Note: Serginho became a naturalised Chinese citizen after joining Beijing Guoan; his official Chinese name was confirmed as Sai Erjini'ao)
8	MF	MLI	Boubacar Konté
9	FW	CHN	Zhang Yuning
10	MF	CHN	Zhang Xizhe (captain)
11	FW	CHN	Lin Liangming
14	GK	CHN	Lu Tongyun
17	FW	CHN	Yang Liyu
18	MF	CHN	Wang Yu
20	MF	FRA	Béni Nkololo
21	DF	HKG	Yue Tze Nam
22	GK	CHN	Han Jiaqi
23	MF	BRA	Dawhan
24	DF	CHN	Abduhamit Abdugheni
25	DF	SRB	Uroš Spajić
26	DF	CHN	Bai Yang
27	DF	CHN	Wang Gang
28	MF	TUN	Jeremy Dudziak

No.	Pos.	Nation	Player
29	FW	ANG	Fábio Abreu
30	DF	CHN	Fan Shuangjie
31	GK	CHN	Liu Shaoziyang
32	MF	CHN	Wang Size
33	GK	CHN	Nureli Abbas
34	GK	CHN	Hou Sen
36	MF	CHN	Jia Feifan
37	MF	CHN	Cao Yongjing
41	MF	CHN	Cheng Xi
42	DF	CHN	Lin Hanqi
43	MF	CHN	Xia Xiaoyu
45	FW	CHN	Ma Mingyang
47	DF	CHN	Deng Jiefu
50	MF	CHN	Zhang Haoran
55	DF	CHN	Luo Zixiang
57	MF	CHN	Liu Junze
58	MF	CHN	Jiang Zicheng
59	MF	CHN	Chen Kangyue
77	FW	COD	Chadrac Akolo

=== Reserve team ===
Note: Flags indicate national team as defined under FIFA eligibility rules; some limited exceptions apply. Players may hold more than one non-FIFA nationality.

No.	Pos.	Nation	Player

=== Out on loan ===
Note: Flags indicate national team as defined under FIFA eligibility rules; some limited exceptions apply. Players may hold more than one non-FIFA nationality.

No.	Pos.	Nation	Player
—	DF	CHN	Li Ruiyue (at Foshan Nanshi until 31 December 2026)
—	DF	CHN	Nebijan Muhmet (at Henan FC until 31 December 2026)

No.	Pos.	Nation	Player
—	GK	CHN	Zhang Jianzhi (at Guangxi Hengchen until 31 December 2026)
—	MF	CHN	Jiang Wenhao (at Shaanxi Union until 31 December 2026)

=== Retired numbers ===
12 – retired in Jan 2016 for club Supporters (the 12th Man).

13 – retired for the club legend, Xu Yunlong.

== Senior club officials ==
Position	Staff
Chairman	(China) Zhou Jinhui
Sporting director	(Germany) Matthias Brosamer
Director	(China) Zhu Jialin
Director	(China) Wu Ning
Director	(China) Tang Zhenyi
Director	(China) Liu Xin
Director	(China) Sun Peng
Deputy general manager	(China) Gao Chao
Deputy general manager	(China) Zhang Sihua
Deputy general manager	(China) Pan Yegang
Youth Training Director	(Netherlands) Patrick Ladru
Youth Training Development Director	(China) Wei Kexing
Youth Training Executive Director	(Netherlands) Paul Van Lith
Deputy Youth Training Development Director	(China) Yang Pu
Chief Financial Officer	(China) Li Ping
Chief Commercial Officer	(China) Xu Yunlong
Head of Training Department	(China) Lü Jun
Corporate Communication Director	(China) Cao Xiao
Manager of Cooperative Youth Training Schools	(China) Zhang Xinxin

== Technical staff ==
Position	Staff
Head coach	(Scotland) Nick Montgomery
Assistant coach	(China) Sui Dongliang (China) Tao Wei (Portugal) Filipe Pedro (Scotland) Andy Thomson
Goalkeeping coach	(Switzerland) Jörg Stiel (China) Liu Peng
Fitness coach	(Spain) Javier Poveda
Team physician	(China) Wang Kai (China) Zhang Zhiguo
Team leader	(China) Fu Bin
Analyst	(China) Cheng Jun
Kit manager	(China) Kang Yuming
Interpreter	(China) Jiang Xiaojun
Interpreter	(China) Fu Hao
U-21 team head coach	(China) Zhai Biao
U-19 team head coach	(China) Le Beisi
U-17 team head coach	(China) Yu Dabao
U-15 team head coach	(China) Huang Yong
U-14 team head coach	(China) Wang Ruijie
U-13 team head coach	(China) Tang Xiaokun (Southern team) (China) Ruan Jia (Northern team)

=== Manager history ===
Name	Coaching period
(China) Xue Jizhu	1956
(China) Chen Chengda	1957–1958
(China) Shi Wanchun	1959–1972
(China) Zeng Xuelin	1973–1982
(China) Sun Yunshan	1983–1985
(China) Jin Zhiyang	1986
(China) Cheng Wenkuan	1987
(China) Tang Pengju	1988–1994
(China) Jin Zhiyang	1995–1998
(China) Shen Xiangfu	1998–1999
(Federal Republic of Yugoslavia) Milovan Đorić	1999–2000
(China) Wei Kexing	2000–2002
(Federal Republic of Yugoslavia) Ljupko Petrović	2002
(Brazil) Jose Carlos de Oliveira	2002–2003
(Federal Republic of Yugoslavia) Ljupko Petrović	2003
(China) Wei Kexing	2003–2004
(China) Shen Xiangfu	2005–2006
(South Korea) Lee Jang-soo	2006–2009
(China) Hong Yuanshuo	2009–2010
(China) Wei Kexing	2010 (caretaker)
(Portugal) Jaime Pacheco	2010–2012
(Serbia) Aleksandar Stanojević	2012–2013
(China) Xie Feng	2014 (caretaker)
(Spain) Gregorio Manzano	2014–2015
(Italy) Alberto Zaccheroni	2016
(China) Xie Feng	2016 (caretaker)
(Spain) José González	2016–2017
(China) Xie Feng	2017 (caretaker)
(Germany) Roger Schmidt	2017–2019
(France) Bruno Génésio	2019–2020
(Croatia) Slaven Bilić	2021
(China) Xie Feng	2022
(China) Sui Dongliang	2022 (caretaker)
(Netherlands) Stanley Menzo	2022–2023
(Portugal) Ricardo Soares	2023–2024
(Spain) Quique Setién	2025
(Spain) Ramiro Amarelle	2025 (caretaker)
(Scotland) Nick Montgomery	2026–

== Captain history ==
Captain	Birth year	Period
(China) Wei Kexing	1963	1994
(China) Cao Xiandong	1968	1995–1997
(China) Zhou Ning	1974	1998
(China) Xie Zhaoyang	1972	1999–2003
(China) Tao Wei	1978	2004–2008
(China) Yang Pu	1978	2007–2008
(China) Xu Yunlong	1979	2008–2016
(China) Zhang Yonghai	1979	2009
(China) Yang Zhi	1983	2017
(China) Yu Dabao	1988	2018–2024
(China) Zhang Xizhe	1991	2025–

== Honours ==
=== First team ===
All-time honours list, including semi-professional Beijing period.

Chinese Super League

- Winners: 2009
- Runners-up (4): 2007, 2011, 2014, 2019

Chinese Jia-A League

- Winners (5): 1957, 1958, 1973, 1982, 1984

Chinese FA Cup

- Winners (6): 1985, 1996, 1997, 2003, 2018, 2025

Chinese FA Super Cup

- Winners (3): 1997, 2003, 2026

== Personal honours ==
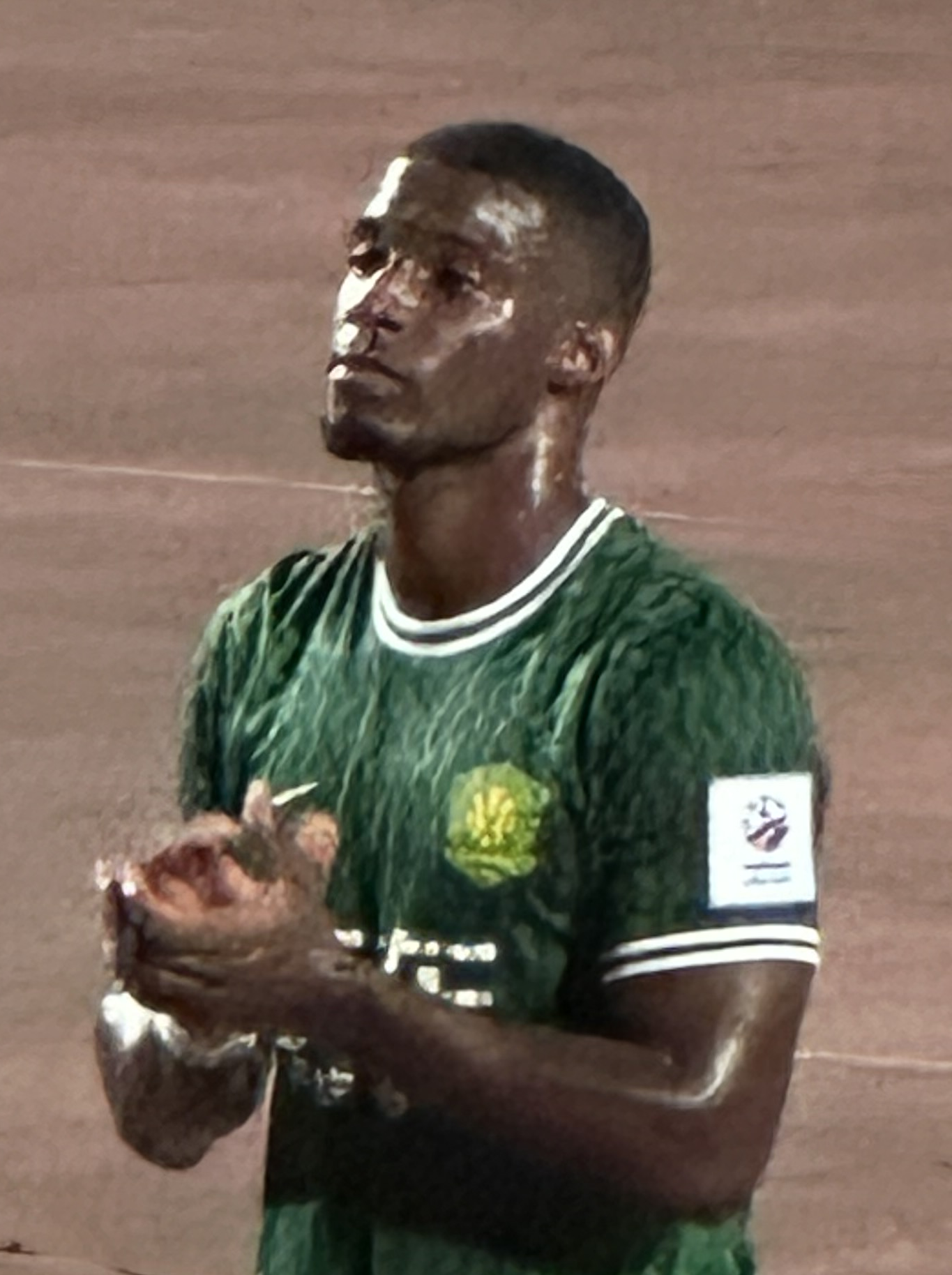
Fábio Abreu is the third and most recent CSL Golden Boot winner from Beijing Guoan, scoring 28 goals in the 2025 league season.

Player	Honour	Season
(Paraguay) Jorge Luis Campos	Player of the Year	1997
(Serbia) Branko Jelić	Player of the Year	2005
(Serbia) Branko Jelić	Chinese Super League Top Scorer	2005
(Spain) Gregorio Manzano	Chinese Football Association Coach of the Year	2014
(Democratic Republic of the Congo) Cédric Bakambu	Chinese Super League Top Scorer	2020
(Angola) Fábio Abreu	Chinese Super League Top Scorer	2025

== Results ==
=== All-time league rankings ===
As of the end of the 2025 league season.

Year	Div	Pld	W	D	L	GF	GA	GD	Pts	Pos.	FA Cup	Super Cup	League Cup	ACL	Other		Att./G	Stadium
1956	1	6	2	3	1	7	5	2	9^{1}	6	3	–	–					–
1957	1	11	8	3	0	28	10	18	30	C	NH	–	–					Xiannongtan Stadium
1958	1	21	17	3	1	54	13	41	58	C	NH	–	–					Xiannongtan Stadium
1960	1	15	5	3	7	14	21	−7	5^{2}	14	QR1	–	–					Workers' Stadium / Xiannongtan Stadium
1961^{3}	1	19	7	9	3	27	14	13	9^{2}	4	NH	–	–					Official Park Stadium / Workers' Stadium
1962	1	15	11	4	0	43	7	36	10^{2}	–^{4}	NH	–	–					Xiannongtan Stadium / Workers' Stadium
1963	1	9	7	2	0	21	5	16	7^{2}	–^{4}	NH	–	–					Xiannongtan Stadium / Workers' Stadium
1964	1	22	9	2	11	24	29	−5	20	6	NH	–	–					Workers' Stadium / Official Park Stadium
1965	1	11	5	2	4	16	14	2	12	3	NH	–	–					–
1973	1	22	15	2	5	43	25	18	21^{2}	C	NH	–	–					Workers' Stadium / Xiannongtan Stadium
1974	1	9^{2}	6^{2}	2^{2}	1^{2}	17^{2}	5^{2}	12^{2}	15^{2}	3	NH	–	–					Workers' Stadium / Xuanwu Stadium
1976	1	9	7	1	1	25	5	20	15	1^{1}	NH	–	–					
1977	1	17	10	6	1	41	14	27	7^{2}	RU	NH	–	–					
1978	1	30	16	12	2	41	18	23	44	3	NH	–	–					
1979	1	30	9	11	10	24	27	−3	29	10	NH	–	–					
1980	1	30	9	11	10	35	33	2	28^{5}	9	NH	–	–					
1981	1	30	20	–	10				40	3	NH	–	–					
1982	1	30	22	–	8	37	18	19	44	C	NH	–	–					
1983	1	16	12	–	4	19	16	3	24	2^{6}	NH	–	–					
1984	1	30	23	–	7	47	30	17	46	C	5	–	–					
1985	1	15	7	–	8				16	10	C	–	–					
1986	1	14	8	4	2	20	12	8	20	3	RU	–	–					
1987	1	14	5	2	7	19	25	−6	17	6	NH	–	–					
1988	1	25	12	3	10	25	27	−2	40.5	9	NH	–	–					
1989	2	22	9	10	3	32	15	17	40	3	NH	–	–					
1990	2	22	14	6	2	40	21	19	48	C	SF	–	–					
1991	1	14	5	5	4	22	21	1	16	3	SF	–	–					
1992	1	14	5	3	6	21	20	1	13	6	QF	–	–					
1993	1	12	6	0	6	18	14	4	12	3	NH	–	–					Heshan City Stadium
1994	1	22	7	8	7	42	34	8	22	8	NH	–	–	DNE			14,091	Xiannongtan Stadium
1995	1	22	12	6	4	36	20	16	42	RU	SF	DNQ	–				26,364	Xiannongtan Stadium
1996	1	22	9	6	7	30	25	5	33	4	C	DNQ	–				36,182	Workers' Stadium
1997	1	22	8	10	4	34	20	14	34	3	C	RU	–		ACWC	3	24,727	Workers' Stadium
1998	1	26	10	13	3	32	19	13	43	3	QF	C	–		ACWC	R2	27,538	Workers' Stadium
1999	1	26	9	9	8	38	25	13	36	6	QF	DNQ	–				24,231	Workers' Stadium
2000	1	26	9	8	9	38	32	6	35	6	RU	DNQ	–				18,692	Workers' Stadium
2001	1	26	9	6	11	30	33	−3	33	8	RU	DNQ	–				15,385	Workers' Stadium
2002	1	28	15	7	6	49	29	20	52	3	R2	DNQ	–				32,429	Workers' Stadium
2003	1	28	9	9	10	34	26	8	36	9	C	C	–				16,500	Workers' Stadium
2004	1	22	8	7	7	35	33	2	28	7	R2	NH	R1				10,864	Workers' Stadium
2005	1	26	12	4	10	46	32	14	40	6	SF	NH	QF				18,923	Workers' Stadium
2006	1	28	13	10	5	27	16	11	49	3	R2	NH	NH				13,571	Fengtai Stadium
2007	1	28	15	9	4	45	19	26	54	RU	NH	NH	NH				21,571	Fengtai Stadium
2008	1	30	16	10	4	44	27	17	58	3	NH	NH	NH	Group			14,641	Fengtai Stadium
2009	1	30	13	12	5	48	28	20	51	C	NH	NH	NH	Group			36,805	Workers' Stadium
2010	1	30	12	10	8	35	29	6	46	5	NH	NH	NH	R16			33,342	Workers' Stadium
2011	1	30	14	11	5	49	21	28	53	RU	SF	NH	NH	DNQ			40,397	Workers' Stadium
2012	1	30	14	6	10	34	35	−1	48	3	QF	DNQ	NH	Group			36,879	Workers' Stadium
2013	1	30	14	9	7	54	31	23	51	3	SF	DNQ	NH	R16			39,269	Workers' Stadium
2014	1	30	21	4	5	50	25	25	67	RU	QF	DNQ	NH	Group			39,395	Workers' Stadium
2015	1	30	16	8	6	46	26	20	56	4	R4	DNQ	NH	R16			40,997	Workers' Stadium
2016	1	30	11	10	9	34	26	18	43	5	QF	DNQ	NH	DNQ			38,140	Workers' Stadium
2017	1	30	11	7	12	42	42	0	40	9	R4	DNQ	NH	DNQ			34,686	Workers' Stadium
2018	1	30	15	8	7	64	45	19	53	4	C	DNQ	NH	DNQ			41,743	Workers' Stadium
2019	1	30	23	1	6	60	26	34	70	RU	QF	RU	NH	Group			39,938	Workers' Stadium
2020	1	20^{7}	10^{7}	7^{7}	3^{7}	44^{7}	27^{7}	17^{7}	28^{1}	3	QF	DNQ	NH	QF			–^{8}	–^{8}
2021	1	22^{7}	9^{7}	6^{7}	7^{7}	26^{7}	28^{7}	-2^{7}	33	5	R4	DNQ	NH	Group			–^{9}	–^{9}
2022	1	34	17	7	10	57	49	8	58	7	R2	DNQ	NH	DNQ			–^{10}	–^{10}
2023	1	30	14	9	7	53	35	18	51	6	QF	DNQ	NH	DNQ			43,769	Workers' Stadium
2024	1	30	16	8	6	65	35	30	56	4	QF	DNQ	NH	DNQ			46,444	Workers' Stadium
2025	1	30	17	6	7	69	46	23	57	4	C	DNQ	NH	DNQ	ACL Two	Group	44,975	Workers' Stadium

- No league games in 1959, 1966–72, and 1975.
- ^1 In group stage.
- ^2 In final group stage.
- ^3 Unable to complete full season, Youth team representing region.
- ^4 Did not play for position.
- ^5 Deducted one point.
- ^6 In the northern league.
- ^7 Includes playoffs.
- ^8 The 2020 Chinese Super League was held behind closed doors most of the time; attendance and stadium not applicable.
- ^9 The 2021 Chinese Super League was held behind closed doors as tournament-style competition due to COVID-19 pandemic; attendance and stadium not applicable.
- ^10 The 2022 Chinese Super League was held mostly behind closed doors due to COVID-19 pandemic; attendance and stadium not applicable as the earlier part of the season was played tournament-style in select locations. Guoan utilized the Rizhao International Football Center Stadium for the latter portion of the season when the league returned to playing home-away games.

Key

	China top division
	China second division
	China third division
C	Champions
RU	Runners-up
3	Third place
	Relegated

- Pld = Played
- W = Games won
- D = Games drawn
- L = Games lost
- F = Goals for
- A = Goals against
- Pts = Points
- Pos = Final position
- R1 = Round 1
- R2 = Round 2
- R3 = Round 3
- R4 = Round 4
- F = Final
- SF = Semi-finals
- QF = Quarter-finals
- R16 = Round of 16
- Group = Group stage
- GS2 = Second Group stage
- QR1 = First Qualifying Round
- QR2 = Second Qualifying Round
- QR3 = Third Qualifying Round

=== International results ===
As of 3 November 2026

Season	Competition	Round	Opposition	Score
1997–98	Asian Cup Winners' Cup	First round	(Maldives) New Radiant	4–0 (H), 8–0 (N)
1997–98	Asian Cup Winners' Cup	Second round	(Bangladesh) Abahani KC	0–1 (A), 2–0 (H)
1997–98	Asian Cup Winners' Cup	Quarter-finals	(Japan) Verdy Kawasaki	0–2 (A), 1–0 (H)
1997–98	Asian Cup Winners' Cup	Semi-finals	(South Korea) Suwon Samsung Bluewings	0–5 (N)
1997–98	Asian Cup Winners' Cup	Third place match	(Turkmenistan) Köpetdag Aşgabat	4–1 (N)
1998–99	Asian Cup Winners' Cup	First round	(India) Salgaocar	1–0 (A), 4–0 (H)
1998–99	Asian Cup Winners' Cup	Second round	(South Korea) Chunnam Dragons	0–2 (H), 2–0 (A)
2008	AFC Champions League	Group F	(Vietnam) Nam Định F.C.	1–3 (A), 3–0 (H)
2008	AFC Champions League	Group F	(Thailand) Krung Thai Bank F.C.	4–2 (H), 5–3 (A)
2008	AFC Champions League	Group F	(Japan) Kashima Antlers	1–0 (A), 1–0 (H)
2009	AFC Champions League	Group E	(Australia) Newcastle Jets FC	2–0 (H), 2–1 (A)
2009	AFC Champions League	Group E	(Japan) Nagoya Grampus	0–0 (A), 1–1 (H)
2009	AFC Champions League	Group E	(South Korea) Ulsan Hyundai FC	1–0 (A), 0–1 (H)
2010	AFC Champions League	Group E	(Australia) Melbourne Victory FC	1–0 (H), 0–0 (A)
2010	AFC Champions League	Group E	(Japan) Kawasaki Frontale	1–3 (A), 2–0 (H)
2010	AFC Champions League	Group E	(South Korea) Seongnam Ilhwa Chunma	3–1 (A), 0–1 (H)
2010	AFC Champions League	Round of 16	(South Korea) Suwon Samsung Bluewings	2–0 (A)
2012	AFC Champions League	Group F	(South Korea) Ulsan Hyundai FC	2–1 (A), 2–3 (H)
2012	AFC Champions League	Group F	(Australia) Brisbane Roar FC	1–1 (H), 1–1 (A)
2012	AFC Champions League	Group F	(Japan) FC Tokyo	1–1 (H), 3–0 (A)
2013	AFC Champions League	Group G	(South Korea) Pohang Steelers	0–0 (A), 2–0 (H)
2013	AFC Champions League	Group G	(Japan) Sanfrecce Hiroshima	2–1 (H), 0–0 (A)
2013	AFC Champions League	Group G	(Uzbekistan) Bunyodkor PFK	0–0 (A), 0–1 (H)
2013	AFC Champions League	Round of 16	(South Korea) FC Seoul	0–0 (H), 3–1 (A)
2014	AFC Champions League	Play-off round 3	(Thailand) Chonburi F.C.	4–0 (H)
2014	AFC Champions League	Group F	(Japan) Sanfrecce Hiroshima	1–1 (A), 2–2 (H)
2014	AFC Champions League	Group F	(South Korea) FC Seoul	1–1 (H), 2–1 (A)
2014	AFC Champions League	Group F	(Australia) Central Coast Mariners FC	2–1 (H), 1–0 (A)
2015	AFC Champions League	Play-off round	(Thailand) Bangkok Glass F.C.	3–0 (H)
2015	AFC Champions League	Group G	(Australia) Brisbane Roar FC	0–1 (A), 0–1 (H)
2015	AFC Champions League	Group G	(South Korea) Suwon Samsung Bluewings	1–0 (H), 1–1 (A)
2015	AFC Champions League	Group G	(Japan) Urawa Red Diamonds	2–0 (H), 1–1 (A)
2015	AFC Champions League	Round of 16	(South Korea) Jeonbuk Hyundai Motors FC	1–1 (A), 0–1 (H)
2019	AFC Champions League	Group G	(South Korea) Jeonbuk Hyundai Motors FC	0–1 (H), 3–1 (A)
2019	AFC Champions League	Group G	(Japan) Urawa Red Diamonds	0–0 (H), 3–0 (A)
2019	AFC Champions League	Group G	(Thailand) Buriram United	2–0 (H), 1–3 (A)
2020	AFC Champions League	Group E	(South Korea) FC Seoul	2–1 (N), 3–1 (N)
2020	AFC Champions League	Group E	(Thailand) Chiangrai United	0–1 (A), 1–1 (N)
2020	AFC Champions League	Group E	(Australia) Melbourne Victory	3–1 (N), 2–0 (N)
2020	AFC Champions League	Round of 16	(Japan) FC Tokyo	1–0 (N)
2020	AFC Champions League	Quarter-final	(South Korea) Ulsan Hyundai	0–2 (N)
2021	AFC Champions League	Group I	(Philippines) United City	1–1 (N), 2–3 (N)
2021	AFC Champions League	Group I	(Japan) Kawasaki Frontale	0–7 (N), 0–4 (N)
2021	AFC Champions League	Group I	(South Korea) Daegu FC	0–5 (N), 0–3 (N)
2025–26	AFC Champions League Two	Group E	(Australia) Macarthur	0–3 (A), 1–2 (H)
2025–26	AFC Champions League Two	Group E	(Hong Kong) Tai Po	3–3 (A), 3–0 (H)
2025–26	AFC Champions League Two	Group E	(Vietnam) Công An Hà Nội	2–2 (H), 1–2 (A)
2026–27	AFC Champions League Elite	League stage	(Thailand) Buriram United	1–0 (A)
2026–27	AFC Champions League Elite	League stage	(South Korea) Jeonbuk Hyundai Motors	2–2 (H)
2026–27	AFC Champions League Elite	League stage	(South Korea) Daejeon Hana Citizen	
2026–27	AFC Champions League Elite	League stage	(Australia) Newcastle Jets	
2026–27	AFC Champions League Elite	League stage	(Thailand) Port	4–7 (A)
2026–27	AFC Champions League Elite	League stage	(South Korea) Pohang Steelers	3–1 (H)
2026–27	AFC Champions League Elite	League stage	(Vietnam) Công An Hà Nội	
2026–27	AFC Champions League Elite	League stage	(Thailand) Ratchaburi	

On neutral venues, the scores for Beijing F.C. are written first.

Key

- (H) = Home
- (A) = Away
- (N) = Neutral

== Records ==
=== Wins ===
- Biggest win overall: 9–1 (Shanghai Shenhua 20 July 1997 – Jia-A League), 8–0 (New Radiant 29 August 1997 – Asian Cup Winners Cup)
- Biggest league win overall: 9–1 (Shanghai Shenhua 20 July 1997 – Jia-A League)
- Biggest domestic cup win overall: 7–0 (vs. Yunnan Yukun, 20 August 2025 – Chinese FA Cup)
- Biggest home win overall: 9–1 (Shanghai Shenhua 20 July 1997 – Jia-A League)
- Biggest home league win: 9–1 (Shanghai Shenhua 20 July 1997 – Jia-A League)
- Biggest home win in all Asian competitions: 4–0 (Salgaocar SC Goa 3 October 1998 – Asian Cup Winners Cup), 4–0 (New Radiant 27 August 1997 – Asian Cup Winners Cup)
- Biggest home CFA Cup win: 7–0 (Yunnan Yukun 20 August 2025)
- Biggest away win overall: 8–0 (New Radiant 29 August 1997 – Asian Cup Winners Cup)
- Biggest away league win: 6–1 (Shandong Luneng 8 August 2007 – Chinese Super League)
- Biggest away win in all Asian competitions: 8–0 (New Radiant 29 August 1997 – Asian Cup Winners Cup)
- Biggest away CFA Cup win: 5–0 (Bayi FC 20 September 1997), 5–0 (Beijing Renhe 3 May 2017), 5–0 (Shijiazhuang Gongfu 21 May 2025)

=== Defeats ===
- Biggest defeat overall: 0–7 (Kawasaki Frontale 29 June 2021 – AFC Champions League)
- Biggest home defeat overall: 0–4 (Changchun Yatai 29 September 2012 – Chinese Super League)
- Biggest home league defeat: 0–4 (Changchun Yatai 29 September 2012 – Chinese Super League)
- Biggest away defeat overall: 0–6 (Shandong Taishan 31 August 2025 – Chinese Super League)
- Biggest away league defeat: 0–6 (Shandong Taishan 31 August 2025 – Chinese Super League)

=== Streaks ===
- Consecutive league wins: 10 (from 1 March 2019 to 17 May 2019)
- Consecutive league matches unbeaten: 25 (4 August 2024 Round 21 – 30 June 2025 Round 16)
- Consecutive league home matches unbeaten: 29 (29 September 1996 – 4 April 1999)

== Culture ==
Beijing Guoan has a team anthem that plays every home game. Fans normally sing along when they are about to win, in the last 3 minutes of the game. The song is called 'Guoan Always Strive for First'.

== See also ==
- Beijing Guoan Talent Singapore
