= 2019 Chinese Super League =

Chinese Super League
- Season: 2019
- Dates: 1 March – 1 December 2019
- Champions: Guangzhou Evergrande Taobao (8th title)
- Relegated: Beijing Renhe
- AFC Champions League: Guangzhou Evergrande Taobao; Beijing Sinobo Guoan; Shanghai SIPG; Shanghai Greenland Shenhua
- Matches: 240
- Goals: 741 (3.09 per match)
- Top goalscorer: Eran Zahavi (29 goals)
- Biggest home win: Shanghai Greenland Shenhua 5–1 Beijing Renhe (7 April 2019); Jiangsu Suning 5–1 Guangzhou R&F (21 April 2019); Shanghai SIPG 5–1 Tianjin TEDA (14 August 2019)
- Biggest away win: Guangzhou R&F 0–5 Guangzhou Evergrande Taobao (20 July 2019)
- Highest scoring: Shanghai Greenland Shenhua 5–3 Guangzhou R&F (27 July 2019); Shenzhen 4–4 Wuhan Zall (26 October 2019)
- Longest winning run: 13 matches Guangzhou Evergrande Taobao
- Longest unbeaten run: 15 matches Guangzhou Evergrande Taobao
- Longest winless run: 18 matches Beijing Renhe
- Longest losing run: 8 matches Beijing Renhe
- Highest attendance: 57,056; Beijing Sinobo Guoan 1–3 Guangzhou Evergrande Taobao (11 August 2019)
- Lowest attendance: 2,634; Beijing Renhe 2–3 Jiangsu Suning (23 November 2019)
- Total attendance: 5,595,368
- Average attendance: 23,314

The 2019 Ping An Chinese Football Association Super League (Chinese: 2019中国平安中国足球协会超级联赛) was the 16th season since the establishment of the Chinese Super League. The league title sponsor was Ping An Insurance. The season began on 1 March and ended on 1 December. Shanghai SIPG were the defending champions.

The policy regarding foreign players and U-23 domestic players was modified for this season. The same as the previous two seasons, at least one domestic player who is under the age of 23 (born on or after 1 January 1996) must be in the starting eleven. However, the total number of foreign players appearing in a match is no longer related to the total number of U-23 domestic players. A club can register four foreign players at most in the same time and use three foreign players at most in a match. On the other hand, at least three U-23 domestic players must be used in a match. In addition, if there are U-23 players who have been called up by the national teams at all levels, the number of U-23 domestic players fielded will be reduced accordingly. The policy was modified again during the season. From Round 16 and beyond, maximum of three foreign players can be used at the same time in one match and there must be at least one U-23 domestic player playing in one match. In addition, if there are U-23 players who have been called up by the national teams at all levels, the team is not required to field any U-23 players.

== Club changes ==
Clubs promoted from 2018 China League One

- Wuhan Zall
- Shenzhen

Clubs relegated to 2019 China League One

- Changchun Yatai
- Guizhou Hengfeng

Wuhan Zall and Shenzhen return to the division after a 5-year absence and a 7-year absence respectively. Changchun Yatai were relegated after a 13-year spell in the Chinese top-flight, while Guizhou Hengfeng were relegated to China League One after spending 2 seasons in the Chinese Super League.

=== Name changes ===
- Tianjin Quanjian changed their name to Tianjin Tianhai in January 2019.

== Clubs ==
=== Personnel and stadiums ===
Team	Head coach	City	Stadium	Capacity	2018 season
Shanghai SIPG	(Portugal) Vítor Pereira	Shanghai	Shanghai Stadium	56,842	1st
Guangzhou Evergrande Taobao	(Italy) Fabio Cannavaro	Guangzhou	Tianhe Stadium	54,856	2nd
Shandong Luneng Taishan	(China) Li Xiaopeng	Jinan	Jinan Olympic Sports Center Stadium	56,808	3rd
Beijing Sinobo Guoan	(France) Bruno Génésio	Beijing	Workers' Stadium	66,161	4th
Jiangsu Suning	(Romania) Cosmin Olăroiu	Nanjing	Nanjing Olympic Sports Centre	61,443	5th
Hebei China Fortune	(China) Xie Feng (caretaker)	Langfang	Langfang Stadium	30,040	6th
Shanghai Greenland Shenhua	(South Korea) Choi Kang-hee	Shanghai	Hongkou Football Stadium	33,060	7th
Beijing Renhe	(China) Wang Bo	Beijing	Beijing Fengtai Stadium	31,043	8th
Tianjin Tianhai	(China) Li Weifeng	Tianjin	Tianjin Olympic Centre	54,696	9th
Guangzhou R&F	(Serbia) Dragan Stojković	Guangzhou	Yuexiushan Stadium	18,000	10th
Dalian Yifang	(Spain) Rafael Benítez	Dalian	Dalian Sports Centre Stadium	61,000	11th
Henan Jianye	(China) Wang Baoshan	Zhengzhou	Hanghai Stadium	29,860	12th
Chongqing Dangdai Lifan	(Netherlands) Jordi Cruyff	Chongqing	Chongqing Olympic Sports Center	58,680	13th
Tianjin TEDA	(Germany) Uli Stielike	Tianjin	Tianjin Olympic Centre	54,696	14th
Wuhan Zall ^{P}	(China) Li Tie	Wuhan	Wuhan Five Rings Sports Center	30,000	CL1, 1st
Shenzhen ^{P}	(Italy) Roberto Donadoni	Shenzhen	Shenzhen Universiade Sports Centre	60,334	CL1, 2nd

=== Locations ===
Location of teams in 2019 Chinese Super League

=== Managerial changes ===
Team	Outgoing manager	Manner of departure	Date of vacancy	Position in table	Incoming manager	Date of appointment
Tianjin Tianhai	(South Korea) Park Choong-kyun	Appointed as assistant coach	12 November 2018	Pre-season	(South Korea) Choi Kang-hee	3 December 2018
Beijing Renhe	(Spain) Luis García	Signed by Villarreal	10 December 2018	Pre-season	(Serbia) Aleksandar Stanojević	18 December 2018
Shanghai Greenland Shenhua	(China) Wu Jingui	Appointed as sporting director	25 December 2018	Pre-season	(Spain) Quique Sánchez Flores	25 December 2018
Tianjin Tianhai	(South Korea) Choi Kang-hee	Signed by Dalian Yifang	11 February 2019	Pre-season	(China) Shen Xiangfu	15 February 2019
Dalian Yifang	(Germany) Bernd Schuster	Mutual consent	11 February 2019	Pre-season	(South Korea) Choi Kang-hee	11 February 2019
Hebei China Fortune	(Wales) Chris Coleman	Sacked	15 May 2019	15th	(China) Xie Feng (caretaker)	15 May 2019
Tianjin Tianhai	(China) Shen Xiangfu	Sacked	28 May 2019	16th	(South Korea) Park Choong-kyun	28 May 2019
Dalian Yifang	(South Korea) Choi Kang-hee	Mutual consent	1 July 2019	10th	(Spain) Rafael Benítez	2 July 2019
Shanghai Greenland Shenhua	(Spain) Quique Sánchez Flores	Mutual consent	3 July 2019	12th	(South Korea) Choi Kang-hee	5 July 2019
Beijing Renhe	(Serbia) Aleksandar Stanojević	Mutual consent	9 July 2019	15th	(Spain) Luis García	9 July 2019
Shenzhen	(Spain) Juan Ramón López Caro	Sacked	30 July 2019	15th	(Italy) Roberto Donadoni	30 July 2019
Beijing Sinobo Guoan	(Germany) Roger Schmidt	Sacked	31 July 2019	3rd	(France) Bruno Génésio	31 July 2019
Tianjin Tianhai	(South Korea) Park Choong-kyun	Sacked	8 October 2019	15th	(China) Li Weifeng	8 October 2019
Beijing Renhe	(Spain) Luis García	Sacked	12 November 2019	16th	(China) Wang Bo	12 November 2019

== Foreign players ==
The policy of foreign players remained unchanged. Clubs can register a total of six foreign players over the course of the season, but the number of foreign players allowed on each CSL team at any given time is limited to four. A maximum of three foreign players can be fielded in each match. In addition, each club can register a Hong Kong, Macau, or Taiwan player of Chinese descent (excluding goalkeepers), provided that he registered as a professional footballer in one of those three association for the first time, as a native player.

- Players name in **bold** indicates the player is registered during the mid-season transfer window.
- Players named in ITALICS have left the club, or are off the roster due to being injured or sent to the reserves.

Team	Player 1	Player 2	Player 3	Player 4	Hong Kong/Macau/ Taiwan Players^{1}	Former players
Beijing Renhe	(Argentina) Augusto Fernández	(Kenya) Ayub Masika	(Netherlands) **Elvis Manu**	(Senegal) Makhete Diop		(Nigeria) Sone Aluko
Beijing Sinobo Guoan	(Brazil) **Fernando**	(Brazil) Renato Augusto	(Democratic Republic of the Congo) Cédric Bakambu	(South Korea) Kim Min-jae		(Spain) Jonathan Viera
Chongqing Dangdai Lifan	(Brazil) Alan Kardec	(Brazil) Luiz Fernandinho	(Brazil) **Marcinho**	(Poland) Adrian Mierzejewski		(Brazil) Fernandinho
Dalian Yifang	(Belgium) Yannick Carrasco	(Ghana) Emmanuel Boateng	(Slovakia) Marek Hamšík	(Venezuela) **Salomón Rondón**		(Hong Kong) Alex Tayo Akande (Zimbabwe) Nyasha Mushekwi
Guangzhou Evergrande Taobao	(Brazil) Paulinho	(Brazil) Talisca	(South Korea) Park Ji-soo			(Brazil) **Elkeson** (England) Tyias Browning
Guangzhou R&F	(Belgium) Mousa Dembélé	(Israel) Dia Saba	(Israel) Eran Zahavi	(Serbia) Duško Tošić	(Hong Kong) **Tan Chun Lok**	
Hebei China Fortune	(Argentina) Ezequiel Lavezzi	(Argentina) Javier Mascherano	(Brazil) **Fernandinho**	(Brazil) Marcão	(Hong Kong) Andy Russell	(Morocco) Ayoub El Kaabi
Henan Jianye	(Brazil) **Fernando Karanga**	(Brazil) Ivo	(Cameroon) Christian Bassogog	(Cameroon) Franck Ohandza	(Chinese Taipei) Tim Chow	(Brazil) Henrique Dourado
Jiangsu Suning	(Brazil) Alex Teixeira	(Brazil) **Miranda**	(Croatia) **Ivan Santini**	(Italy) Éder		(Brazil) Ramires (Italy) Gabriel Paletta
Shandong Luneng Taishan	(Belgium) Marouane Fellaini	(Brazil) **Moisés**	(Brazil) Róger Guedes	(Italy) Graziano Pellè		(Brazil) Gil
Shanghai Greenland Shenhua	(Colombia) Giovanni Moreno	(Italy) **Stephan El Shaarawy**	(Nigeria) Odion Ighalo	(South Korea) **Kim Shin-wook**		(Colombia) Fredy Guarín (Paraguay) Óscar Romero
Shanghai SIPG	(Austria) **Marko Arnautović**	(Brazil) Hulk	(Brazil) Oscar	(Uzbekistan) Odil Ahmedov		(Brazil) Elkeson
Shenzhen	(Cameroon) **John Mary**	(Colombia) Harold Preciado	(Norway) Ole Selnæs	(Portugal) **Dyego Sousa**		(Norway) Ola Kamara (Senegal) Cheikh M'Bengue
Tianjin TEDA	(Brazil) Johnathan Goiano	(Germany) Felix Bastians	(Germany) Sandro Wagner	(Ghana) Frank Acheampong		
Tianjin Tianhai	(Brazil) Alan	(Brazil) **Leonardo**	(Brazil) Renatinho	(South Korea) **Song Ju-hun**		(Brazil) Alexandre Pato (South Korea) Kwon Kyung-won
Wuhan Zall	(Brazil) Léo Baptistão	(Brazil) Rafael Silva	(Cameroon) Stéphane Mbia	(Ivory Coast) Jean Evrard Kouassi		

- **^1** For Hong Kong, Macau, or Taiwanese players, if they are non-naturalized and were registered as professional footballers in Hong Kong's, Macau's, or Chinese Taipei's football association for the first time, they are recognized as native players. Otherwise they are recognized as foreign players.

== League table ==
Pos	Team	Pld	W	D	L	GF	GA	GD	Pts	Qualification or relegation
1	Guangzhou Evergrande Taobao (C)	30	23	3	4	68	24	+44	72	Qualification for Champions League group stage
2	Beijing Sinobo Guoan	30	23	1	6	60	26	+34	70	Qualification for Champions League group stage
3	Shanghai SIPG	30	20	6	4	62	26	+36	66	Qualification for Champions League play-off round
4	Jiangsu Suning	30	15	8	7	60	41	+19	53	
5	Shandong Luneng Taishan	30	15	6	9	55	35	+20	51	
6	Wuhan Zall	30	12	8	10	41	41	0	44	
7	Tianjin TEDA	30	12	5	13	43	45	−2	41 (Note: Head-to-head results: Henan Jianye 2–3 Tianjin TEDA, Tianjin TEDA 2–0 Henan Jianye.)	
8	Henan Jianye	30	11	8	11	41	46	−5	41	
9	Dalian Yifang	30	10	8	12	44	51	−7	38	
10	Chongqing Dangdai Lifan	30	9	9	12	36	47	−11	36	
11	Hebei China Fortune	30	9	6	15	37	55	−18	33	
12	Guangzhou R&F	30	9	5	16	54	72	−18	32	
13	Shanghai Greenland Shenhua	30	8	6	16	43	57	−14	30	Qualification for Champions League group stage (Note: Shanghai Greenland Shenhua qualified for the AFC Champions League group stage as Chinese FA Cup winners.)
14	Tianjin Tianhai (Note: Tianjin Tianhai folded after the season.) (R, D)	30	4	13	13	40	53	−13	25	Folded after season
15	Shenzhen (Note: Shenzhen were reprieved from relegation after Tianjin Tianhai folded.)	30	4	9	17	31	57	−26	21	
16	Beijing Renhe (R)	30	3	5	22	26	65	−39	14	Relegation to China League One

Source: CSL
Rules for classification:
- During season: 1) Points; 2) Goal difference; 3) Goals scored.
- After season: 1) Points; 2) Head-to-head points; 3) Head-to-head goal difference; 4) Head-to-head goals scored; 5) Scores of the weight ratio of the reserve league and youth leagues.
  (C) Champions; (D) Disqualified; (R) Relegated
  Notes:

== Results ==
Home \ Away	BJR	BJS	CQ	DLY	GZE	GZF	HBC	HN	JSS	SD	SGS	SSI	SZ	TTD	TTH	WH
Beijing Renhe	—	0–1	1–4	1–3	2–1	1–4	1–2	1–2	2–3	0–2	1–4	1–1	2–2	2–1	2–0	0–2
Beijing Sinobo Guoan	2–1	—	4–1	4–1	1–3	3–2	2–0	2–1	3–0	3–2	2–1	0–2	3–0	3–1	2–1	3–0
Chongqing Dangdai Lifan	2–0	0–4	—	1–3	0–1	2–2	2–1	0–0	1–2	1–1	1–0	2–2	1–0	1–0	1–1	0–1
Dalian Yifang	2–0	0–2	1–1	—	0–1	3–2	3–3	3–1	2–2	1–0	1–0	1–2	2–0	1–2	2–2	1–2
Guangzhou Evergrande Taobao	3–0	0–1	1–1	4–1	—	2–0	2–1	2–2	2–2	2–1	3–0	2–0	1–0	1–0	3–0	0–1
Guangzhou R&F	3–1	1–4	4–2	3–3	0–5	—	2–2	2–0	2–2	1–3	2–1	2–2	3–1	2–1	2–1	3–4
Hebei China Fortune	1–1	0–1	3–0	1–0	1–3	2–1	—	2–3	3–2	0–3	2–1	1–2	1–1	2–1	2–2	0–2
Henan Jianye	2–1	1–0	1–0	1–1	2–5	1–0	4–1	—	2–1	3–2	1–2	0–1	1–0	2–3	2–1	0–0
Jiangsu Suning	4–1	1–0	3–1	1–1	3–1	5–1	4–1	3–0	—	1–1	0–1	0–3	2–0	3–2	2–0	2–1
Shandong Luneng Taishan	1–0	2–0	2–0	0–1	0–3	3–1	2–0	2–2	1–1	—	2–2	3–1	3–0	3–1	2–1	3–0
Shanghai Greenland Shenhua	5–1	1–2	0–0	2–1	0–3	5–3	1–2	3–2	1–3	1–3	—	0–4	2–1	0–3	2–3	2–2
Shanghai SIPG	3–0	2–1	2–3	3–0	0–2	2–0	3–0	2–1	3–2	2–1	3–1	—	6–0	5–1	0–0	2–1
Shenzhen	1–1	1–1	0–2	1–2	2–3	4–0	3–1	3–3	0–2	1–1	2–1	0–1	—	0–0	2–1	4–4
Tianjin TEDA	1–0	1–2	2–0	3–3	0–3	4–3	2–0	2–0	2–1	2–1	1–1	0–2	3–0	—	1–1	2–1
Tianjin Tianhai	2–2	0–3	3–3	5–1	1–3	1–2	0–0	1–1	2–2	2–4	2–2	0–0	2–2	1–0	—	3–1
Wuhan Zall	1–0	0–1	2–3	1–0	2–3	2–1	1–2	0–0	1–1	2–1	1–1	1–1	2–0	1–1	2–1	—

Source: CSL
Legend: Blue = home team win; Yellow = draw; Red = away team win.
For upcoming matches, an "a" indicates there is an article about the rivalry between the two participants.

== Positions by round ==
To preserve chronological evolvements, any postponed matches are not included to the round at which they were originally scheduled, but added to the full round they were played immediately afterwards. For example, if a match is scheduled for round 7, but then played between rounds 8 and 9, it will be added to the standings for round 8.

Team ╲ Round	1	2	3	4	5	6	7	8	9	10	11	12	13	14	15	16	17	18	19	20	21	22	23	24	25	26	27	28	29	30
Guangzhou Evergrande Taobao	2	3	3	2	3	2	2	3	3	3	3	3	2	3	2	2	2	2	1	1	1	1	1	1	1	1	1	1	1	1
Beijing Sinobo Guoan	5	2	2	1	1	1	1	1	1	1	1	1	1	1	1	1	1	1	2	3	2	2	2	2	2	3	3	2	2	2
Shanghai SIPG	1	1	1	3	2	3	3	2	2	2	2	2	3	2	3	3	3	3	3	2	3	3	3	3	3	2	2	3	3	3
Jiangsu Suning	4	6	6	9	5	4	4	5	6	5	5	5	5	5	6	6	8	8	6	5	5	5	5	5	5	5	5	5	5	4
Shandong Luneng Taishan	6	5	4	4	6	7	5	4	5	4	4	4	4	4	4	4	4	4	4	4	4	4	4	4	4	4	4	4	4	5
Wuhan Zall	13	7	8	11	13	12	16	14	12	13	11	8	6	8	7	9	5	6	7	7	7	9	6	6	6	6	6	6	6	6
Tianjin TEDA	11	13	9	8	7	6	7	7	7	6	7	7	8	7	8	7	9	10	10	11	9	7	9	7	9	7	8	7	7	7
Henan Jianye	10	11	14	12	15	16	13	9	8	9	10	10	10	9	11	11	11	11	11	9	11	10	10	9	10	10	10	8	8	8
Dalian Yifang	9	10	13	13	10	10	11	12	13	11	9	11	11	11	10	10	7	9	8	8	6	6	7	8	7	8	9	10	10	9
Chongqing Dangdai Lifan	8	12	7	6	4	5	6	6	4	7	6	6	7	6	5	5	6	5	5	6	8	8	8	10	8	9	7	9	9	10
Hebei China Fortune	14	8	10	10	12	13	14	15	15	15	14	15	12	13	13	12	12	12	13	13	13	13	13	13	13	13	13	13	13	11
Guangzhou R&F	7	9	12	14	11	11	9	10	10	8	8	9	9	10	9	8	10	7	9	10	10	11	11	11	11	12	11	11	11	12
Shanghai Greenland Shenhua	16	16	11	7	9	9	10	11	11	12	13	14	15	12	12	14	14	13	12	12	12	12	12	12	12	11	12	12	12	13
Tianjin Tianhai	15	15	16	15	16	15	12	13	14	14	16	16	16	16	16	16	15	15	15	14	14	14	14	15	15	14	14	14	14	14
Shenzhen	3	4	5	5	8	8	8	8	9	10	12	13	13	14	14	13	13	14	14	15	15	15	15	14	14	15	15	15	15	15
Beijing Renhe	12	14	15	16	14	14	15	16	16	16	15	12	14	15	15	15	16	16	16	16	16	16	16	16	16	16	16	16	16	16

Leader and qualification to AFC Champions League group stage
Qualification to AFC Champions League Group stage
Qualification to AFC Champions League play-off round
Relegation to China League One
Disbanded after season

Source: CSL

== Results by match played ==
Team ╲ Round	1	2	3	4	5	6	7	8	9	10	11	12	13	14	15	16	17	18	19	20	21	22	23	24	25	26	27	28	29	30
Beijing Renhe	L	L	L	L	W	D	D	L	L	L	W	W	L	L	L	L	L	L	L	L	D	L	L	L	L	L	D	L	D	L
Beijing Sinobo Guoan	W	W	W	W	W	W	W	W	W	W	L	W	W	W	L	W	W	W	L	L	W	W	L	D	W	L	W	W	W	W
Chongqing Dangdai Lifan	D	L	W	W	W	D	L	D	W	L	D	D	D	W	W	L	L	W	D	L	L	D	D	W	L	L	W	L	L	L
Dalian Yifang	D	D	L	L	W	D	L	D	L	W	W	L	L	D	W	W	W	L	D	W	W	L	D	L	W	L	L	D	L	W
Guangzhou Evergrande Taobao	W	W	W	W	L	W	W	L	D	W	W	W	W	W	W	W	W	W	W	W	W	D	W	L	L	W	D	W	W	W
Guangzhou R&F	D	D	L	L	W	L	W	L	W	W	L	D	L	L	W	W	L	W	L	L	D	L	D	W	W	L	L	L	L	L
Hebei China Fortune	L	W	L	D	L	L	D	L	L	L	W	D	W	L	L	D	W	L	D	W	L	W	L	L	W	L	W	D	L	W
Henan Jianye	D	D	L	D	L	L	W	W	W	L	D	L	D	W	L	L	W	L	D	W	L	L	W	W	L	W	D	W	D	W
Jiangsu Suning	W	L	W	L	W	W	L	D	D	W	L	D	W	L	D	L	L	D	W	W	D	W	D	W	W	W	D	W	W	W
Shandong Luneng Taishan	W	D	W	D	L	L	W	W	L	W	W	D	D	L	W	W	L	W	W	L	L	L	W	W	D	W	D	W	W	L
Shanghai Greenland Shenhua	L	L	W	W	L	D	L	L	D	L	L	D	L	W	L	L	L	W	W	W	D	D	W	L	D	W	L	L	L	L
Shanghai SIPG	W	W	W	L	W	D	W	W	W	W	W	W	L	W	W	W	W	W	D	D	D	W	D	L	W	W	W	L	D	W
Shenzhen	W	W	L	D	L	D	L	W	L	L	L	L	D	L	L	D	D	L	L	L	D	W	L	D	L	L	D	L	D	L
Tianjin TEDA	L	L	W	W	D	W	L	D	D	W	L	L	D	W	L	W	L	L	D	L	W	L	W	W	L	W	L	W	L	W
Tianjin Tianhai	L	L	L	D	D	D	W	D	L	L	L	L	D	D	D	L	D	L	D	W	D	D	D	L	L	W	D	L	W	L
Wuhan Zall	L	W	L	D	L	D	L	D	W	L	W	W	W	L	W	L	W	D	D	D	D	W	L	W	W	L	D	W	W	L

Source: CSL
W = Win; D = Draw; L = Loss

== Player statistics ==
=== Top scorers ===
As of 1 December 2019

Rank	Player	Club	Goals
1	(Israel) Eran Zahavi	Guangzhou R&F	29
2	(Brazil) Paulinho	Guangzhou Evergrande Taobao	19
3	(Brazil) Alex Teixeira	Jiangsu Suning	18
3	(China) Elkeson	Shanghai SIPG; Guangzhou Evergrande Taobao	18
5	(Belgium) Yannick Carrasco	Dalian Yifang	17
5	(Italy) Graziano Pellè	Shandong Luneng Taishan	17
7	(Brazil) Renato Augusto	Beijing Sinobo Guoan	15
8	(Brazil) Alan Kardec	Chongqing Dangdai Lifan	14
9	(Brazil) Johnathan Goiano	Tianjin TEDA	13
9	(Israel) Dia Saba	Guangzhou R&F	13

=== Top assists ===
As of 1 December 2019

Rank	Player	Club	Assists
1	(Brazil) Oscar	Shanghai SIPG	13
2	(China) Yang Liyu	Guangzhou Evergrande Taobao	12
3	(Brazil) Renato Augusto	Beijing Sinobo Guoan	11
3	(China) Cao Yunding	Shanghai Greenland Shenhua	11
5	(China) Tang Miao	Guangzhou R&F	10
6	(Brazil) Alex Teixeira	Jiangsu Suning	9
7	(Ghana) Frank Acheampong	Tianjin TEDA	8
8	(Poland) Adrian Mierzejewski	Chongqing Dangdai Lifan	7
9	10 players		6

=== Hat-tricks ===
Player	For	Against	Result	Date	Ref
(Israel) Eran Zahavi	Guangzhou R&F	Shenzhen	3–1 (H)	26 April 2019	
(Spain) Jonathan Viera	Beijing Sinobo Guoan	Dalian Yifang	4–1 (H)	28 April 2019	
(Italy) Graziano Pellè	Shandong Luneng Taishan	Wuhan Zall	3–0 (H)	28 April 2019	
(Israel) Eran Zahavi	Guangzhou R&F	Wuhan Zall	3–4 (H)	15 June 2019	
(Brazil) Paulinho	Guangzhou Evergrande Taobao	Dalian Yifang	4–1 (H)	16 July 2019	
(China) Elkeson	Guangzhou Evergrande Taobao	Guangzhou R&F	0–5 (A)	20 July 2019	
(South Korea) Kim Shin-wook	Shanghai Greenland Shenhua	Guangzhou R&F	5–3 (H)	27 July 2019	
(Brazil) Alan Kardec^{4}	Chongqing Dangdai Lifan	Beijing Renhe	1–4 (A)	13 October 2019	

== Awards ==
=== Monthly awards ===
Month	Manager of the Month		Player of the Month		Goalkeeper of the Month		U-21 Player of the Month		Reference
Month	Manager	Club	Player	Club	Player	Club	Player	Club	Reference
March	(Germany) Roger Schmidt	Beijing Sinobo Guoan	(Spain) Jonathan Viera	Beijing Sinobo Guoan	(China) Zou Dehai	Beijing Sinobo Guoan	(China) Zhang Yufeng	Beijing Renhe	
April	(Germany) Roger Schmidt	Beijing Sinobo Guoan	(Brazil) Talisca	Guangzhou Evergrande Taobao	(China) Zou Dehai	Beijing Sinobo Guoan	(China) Chen Binbin	Shanghai SIPG	
May	(Portugal) Vítor Pereira	Shanghai SIPG	(Brazil) Hulk	Shanghai SIPG	(China) Gu Chao	Jiangsu Suning	(China) Zhang Yufeng	Beijing Renhe	
June	(Italy) Fabio Cannavaro	Guangzhou Evergrande Taobao	(China) Hao Junmin	Shandong Luneng Taishan	(China) Liu Dianzuo	Guangzhou Evergrande Taobao	(China) Yan Dinghao	Guangzhou Evergrande Taobao	
July	(Italy) Fabio Cannavaro	Guangzhou Evergrande Taobao	(Brazil) Paulinho	Guangzhou Evergrande Taobao	(China) Liu Dianzuo	Guangzhou Evergrande Taobao	(China) Yan Dinghao	Guangzhou Evergrande Taobao	
August	(Italy) Fabio Cannavaro	Guangzhou Evergrande Taobao	(Brazil) Paulinho	Guangzhou Evergrande Taobao	(China) Zhang Lu	Tianjin Tianhai	(China) Yan Dinghao	Guangzhou Evergrande Taobao	
September	(China) Li Tie	Wuhan Zall	(China) Liu Yun	Wuhan Zall	(China) Dong Chunyu	Wuhan Zall	(China) Duan Liuyu	Shandong Luneng Taishan	
October	(China) Li Xiaopeng	Shandong Luneng Taishan	(China) Cao Yunding	Shanghai Greenland Shenhua	(China) Han Rongze	Shandong Luneng Taishan	(China) Zhu Chenjie	Shanghai Greenland Shenhua	

=== Annual awards ===
The awards of 2019 Chinese Super League were announced on 7 December 2019.

Award	Winner	Club
Player of the Season	(Brazil) Paulinho	Guangzhou Evergrande Taobao
Golden Boot	(Israel) Eran Zahavi	Guangzhou R&F
Goalkeeper of the Season	(China) Yan Junling	Shanghai SIPG
Young Player of the Season	(China) Zhu Chenjie	Shanghai Greenland Shenhua
Manager of the Season	(China) Li Xiaopeng	Shandong Luneng Taishan
Best Referee	(Serbia) Milorad Mažić	–
Best Assistant Referee	(China) Zhang Cheng	–
Most Popular Player	(China) Wu Xi	Jiangsu Suning

Team of the Year
Goalkeeper	(China) Yan Junling (Shanghai SIPG)			
Defender	(China) Tang Miao (Guangzhou R&F)	(China) Zhu Chenjie (Shanghai Greenland Shenhua)	(China) Li Ang (Jiangsu Suning)	(China) Li Lei (Beijing Sinobo Guoan)
Midfielder	(China) Wu Xi (Jiangsu Suning)		(Brazil) Paulinho (Guangzhou Evergrande Taobao)	(China) Hao Junmin (Shandong Luneng Taishan)
Forward	(Israel) Eran Zahavi (Guangzhou R&F)		(Italy) Graziano Pellè (Shandong Luneng Taishan)	(China) Yang Liyu (Guangzhou Evergrande Taobao)

== League attendance ==
Pos	Team	Total	High	Low	Average	Change
1	Guangzhou Evergrande Taobao	686,930	49,973	28,973	45,795	−2.6%
2	Beijing Sinobo Guoan	627,012	57,056	32,795	41,801	+0.1%
3	Dalian Yifang	492,790	52,109	20,149	32,853	−0.9%
4	Chongqing Dangdai Lifan	463,510	43,858	19,836	30,901	−4.7%
5	Jiangsu Suning	412,617	47,827	18,336	27,508	−15.4%
6	Shandong Luneng Taishan	332,709	40,117	12,158	22,181	−10.5%
7	Shanghai Greenland Shenhua	327,513	24,123	20,010	21,834	+1.6%
8	Shanghai SIPG	319,070	25,639	12,635	21,271	−1.7%
9	Wuhan Zall	307,258	25,007	15,189	20,484	+197.6%^{†}
10	Henan Jianye	305,407	21,999	17,635	20,360	+10.6%
11	Tianjin TEDA	285,576	31,243	11,221	19,038	+3.0%
12	Hebei China Fortune	266,981	24,283	13,563	17,799	+11.0%
13	Tianjin Tianhai	253,611	31,317	5,073	16,907	−14.2%
14	Shenzhen	244,180	34,986	10,403	16,279	+116.9%^{†}
15	Guangzhou R&F	157,022	13,516	8,938	10,468	+1.4%
16	Beijing Renhe	113,182	22,376	1,253	7,545	−39.8%
	League total	5,595,368	57,056	1,253	23,314	−3.1%

Updated to games played on 1 December 2019
Source: League attendance
Notes:
^{†} Teams played previous season in CL1.
