= 2018 Chinese Super League =

Chinese Super League
- Season: 2018
- Dates: 2 March – 11 November 2018
- Champions: Shanghai SIPG (1st title)
- Relegated: Changchun Yatai; Guizhou Hengfeng
- AFC Champions League: Shanghai SIPG; Guangzhou Evergrande Taobao; Beijing Sinobo Guoan; Shandong Luneng Taishan
- Matches: 240
- Goals: 768 (3.2 per match)
- Top goalscorer: Wu Lei (27 goals)
- Biggest home win: Shanghai SIPG 8–0 Dalian Yifang (3 March 2018)
- Biggest away win: Henan Jianye 0–5 Guangzhou Evergrande Taobao (15 August 2018)
- Highest scoring: Guangzhou Evergrande Taobao 4–5 Guangzhou R&F (2 March 2018); Beijing Sinobo Guoan 6–3 Hebei China Fortune (2 August 2018); Guangzhou Evergrande Taobao 4–5 Shanghai SIPG (3 November 2018)
- Longest winning run: 6 matches Shanghai SIPG
- Longest unbeaten run: 17 matches Beijing Sinobo Guoan
- Longest winless run: 11 matches Tianjin TEDA
- Longest losing run: 5 matches Chongqing Dangdai Lifan; Guizhou Hengfeng
- Highest attendance: 56,544; Beijing Sinobo Guoan vs Shandong Luneng Taishan (5 August 2018)
- Lowest attendance: 5,651; Beijing Renhe vs Guizhou Hengfeng (14 April 2018)
- Average attendance: 24,053

The 2018 Ping An Chinese Football Association Super League (Chinese: 2018中国平安中国足球协会超级联赛) was the 15th season since the establishment of the Chinese Super League. The league title sponsor was Ping An Insurance. Shanghai SIPG won their first ever top-flight title on 7 November 2018 after their 2–1 victory against Beijing Renhe, ending a historic run for Guangzhou Evergrande Taobao, who had won seven consecutive titles beginning with the 2011 season.

Policy regarding foreign players and U-23 domestic players continued to change in this season. At least one domestic player who is under the age of 23 (born on or after 1 January 1995) must be in the starting eleven, the same as in the 2017 season. However, two foreign-player policies have changed: (1) the number of foreign players on a club's roster has been reduced from five to four and (2) the total number of foreign players under contract with a club in a season has been reduced from seven to six. In addition, a new policy affecting both foreign players and U-23 domestic players has been introduced: The total number of foreign players appearing in matches must be no more than the total number of U-23 domestic players. Players from AFC countries no longer hold a special slot. But clubs can register one non-naturalized player from the Hong Kong Football Association, Macau Football Association or Chinese Taipei Football Association (except goalkeepers) as a native player. According to the Chinese FA, a non-naturalized player is a player who was first registered as a professional footballer in one of the three aforementioned football associations. For still more complexity concerning non-naturalized players, players from Hong Kong and Macau must be passport holders of the Hong Kong SAR or the Macau SAR, and players from Taiwan must be citizens of Taiwan. Policy of U-23 domestic players was relaxed in August for the 2018 Asian Games. It existed in name only from October when China U-25 training team was organized.

== Club changes ==
Clubs promoted from 2017 China League One

- Dalian Yifang
- Beijing Renhe

Clubs relegated to 2018 China League One

- Yanbian Funde
- Liaoning Whowin

Beijing Renhe and Dalian Yifang return to the division after a 2-year absence and a 3-year absence respectively. Liaoning Whowin were relegated after an 8-year spell in the Chinese top-flight, while Yanbian Funde were relegated to China League One after spending 2 seasons in the Chinese Super League.

=== Name changes ===
- Guizhou Hengfeng Zhicheng changed their name to Guizhou Hengfeng in December 2017.

== Clubs ==
=== Clubs and locations ===
Team	Head coach	City	Stadium	Capacity	2017 season
Guangzhou Evergrande Taobao	(Italy) Fabio Cannavaro	Guangzhou	Tianhe Stadium	58,500	1st
Shanghai SIPG	(Portugal) Vítor Pereira	Shanghai	Shanghai Stadium	56,842	2nd
Tianjin Quanjian	(South Korea) Park Choong-kyun	Tianjin	Haihe Educational Football Stadium	28,046	3rd
Hebei China Fortune	(Wales) Chris Coleman	Langfang	Langfang Stadium	30,040	4th
Guangzhou R&F	(Serbia) Dragan Stojković	Guangzhou	Yuexiushan Stadium	18,000	5th
Shandong Luneng Taishan	(China) Li Xiaopeng	Jinan	Jinan Olympic Sports Center Stadium	56,808	6th
Changchun Yatai	(China) Chen Jingang	Changchun	Changchun Stadium	41,638	7th
Guizhou Hengfeng	(Romania) Dan Petrescu	Guiyang	Guiyang Olympic Sports Center	51,636	8th
Beijing Sinobo Guoan	(Germany) Roger Schmidt	Beijing	Workers' Stadium	66,161	9th
Chongqing Dangdai Lifan	(Netherlands) Jordi Cruyff	Chongqing	Chongqing Olympic Sports Center	58,680	10th
Shanghai Greenland Shenhua	(China) Wu Jingui	Shanghai	Hongkou Football Stadium	33,060	11th
Jiangsu Suning	(Romania) Cosmin Olăroiu	Nanjing	Nanjing Olympic Sports Centre	61,443	12th
Tianjin TEDA	(Germany) Uli Stielike	Tianjin	Tianjin Olympic Centre	54,696	13th
Henan Jianye	(China) Wang Baoshan	Zhengzhou	Hanghai Stadium	29,860	14th
Dalian Yifang ^{P}	(Germany) Bernd Schuster	Dalian	Dalian Sports Centre Stadium	61,000	CL1, 1st
Beijing Renhe ^{P}	(Spain) Luis García Plaza	Beijing	Beijing Fengtai Stadium	31,043	CL1, 2nd

Location of teams in 2018 Chinese Super League

=== Managerial changes ===
Team	Outgoing manager	Manner of departure	Date of vacancy	Position in table	Incoming manager	Date of appointment
Tianjin Quanjian	(Italy) Fabio Cannavaro	Resigned	6 November 2017	Pre-season	(Portugal) Paulo Sousa	6 November 2017
Guangzhou Evergrande Taobao	(Brazil) Luiz Felipe Scolari	End of contract	9 November 2017	Pre-season	(Italy) Fabio Cannavaro	9 November 2017
Shanghai SIPG	(Portugal) André Villas-Boas	End of contract	30 November 2017	Pre-season	(Portugal) Vítor Pereira	12 December 2017
Shandong Luneng Taishan	(Germany) Felix Magath	End of contract	1 December 2017	Pre-season	(China) Li Xiaopeng	1 December 2017
Chongqing Dangdai Lifan	(South Korea) Chang Woe-ryong	Mutual consent	10 December 2017	Pre-season	(Portugal) Paulo Bento	11 December 2017
Henan Jianye	(China) Guo Guangqi (caretaker)	End of caretaker spell	18 December 2017	Pre-season	(Croatia) Dragan Talajić	18 December 2017
Dalian Yifang	(Spain) Juan Ramón López Caro	End of contract	26 December 2017	Pre-season	(China) Ma Lin	26 December 2017
Dalian Yifang	(China) Ma Lin	Sacked	19 March 2018	16th	(Germany) Bernd Schuster	19 March 2018
Jiangsu Suning	(Italy) Fabio Capello	Mutual consent	28 March 2018	12th	(Romania) Cosmin Olăroiu	28 March 2018
Henan Jianye	(Croatia) Dragan Talajić	Sacked	21 April 2018	14th	(South Korea) Chang Woe-ryong	26 April 2018
Hebei China Fortune	(Chile) Manuel Pellegrini	Mutual consent	19 May 2018	8th	(Wales) Chris Coleman	10 June 2018
Guizhou Hengfeng	(Spain) Gregorio Manzano	Sacked	7 June 2018	16th	(Romania) Dan Petrescu	7 June 2018
Chongqing Dangdai Lifan	(Portugal) Paulo Bento	Resigned	22 July 2018	13th	(China) Hao Haitao (caretaker)	22 July 2018
Chongqing Dangdai Lifan	(China) Hao Haitao (caretaker)	Sacked	8 August 2018	14th	(Netherlands) Jordi Cruyff	8 August 2018
Henan Jianye	(South Korea) Chang Woe-ryong	Mutual consent	27 September 2018	15th	(China) Wang Baoshan	27 September 2018
Tianjin Quanjian	(Portugal) Paulo Sousa	Resigned	4 October 2018	13th	(China) Shen Xiangfu (caretaker)	4 October 2018
Tianjin Quanjian	(China) Shen Xiangfu (caretaker)	Joined China U-25 training team	5 October 2018	13th	(South Korea) Park Choong-kyun	18 October 2018

== Foreign players ==
Clubs can register a total of six foreign players over the course of the season, but the number of foreign players allowed on each CSL team at any given time is limited to four. A maximum of three foreign players can be fielded in each match. In addition, each club can register a Hong Kong, Macau, or Taiwan player of Chinese descent (excluding goalkeepers), provided that he registered as a professional footballer in one of those three association for the first time, as a native player.

- Players named in **bold** indicates the player is registered during the mid-season transfer window.
- Players named in ITALICS have left the club, or are off the roster due to being injured or sent to the reserves.

Team	Player 1	Player 2	Player 3	Player 4	Hong Kong/Macau/ Taiwan Players^{1}	Former players
Beijing Renhe	(Argentina) Augusto Fernández	(Cameroon) Benjamin Moukandjo	(Kenya) **Ayub Masika**	(Senegal) **Makhete Diop**		(Brazil) Ivo (Ecuador) Jaime Ayoví
Beijing Sinobo Guoan	(Brazil) Renato Augusto	(Democratic Republic of the Congo) Cédric Bakambu	(Spain) Jonathan Soriano	(Spain) Jonathan Viera		
Changchun Yatai	(Denmark) Lasse Vibe	(Nigeria) Odion Ighalo	(Poland) **Adrian Mierzejewski**	(Serbia) **Nemanja Pejčinović**		(Brazil) Marinho (Uzbekistan) Anzur Ismailov
Chongqing Dangdai Lifan	(Brazil) Alan Kardec	(Brazil) Fernandinho	(Brazil) Luiz Fernandinho	(Brazil) **Sebá**		(Argentina) Nicolás Aguirre
Dalian Yifang	(Argentina) Nicolás Gaitán	(Belgium) Yannick Carrasco	(Colombia) **Duvier Riascos**	(Zimbabwe) Nyasha Mushekwi		(Portugal) José Fonte
Guangzhou Evergrande Taobao	(Brazil) Alan	(Brazil) **Paulinho**	(Brazil) Ricardo Goulart	(Brazil) **Talisca**		(Serbia) Nemanja Gudelj (South Korea) Kim Young-gwon
Guangzhou R&F	(Brazil) Júnior Urso	(Brazil) Renatinho	(Israel) Eran Zahavi	(Serbia) **Duško Tošić**		(Hong Kong) Tan Chun Lok (Serbia) Marko Perović
Guizhou Hengfeng	(Croatia) Nikica Jelavić	(The Gambia) Bubacarr Trawally	(Ivory Coast) **Kevin Boli**	(Spain) Mario Suárez	(Hong Kong) Festus Baise ^{2}	(Netherlands) Tjaronn Chery
Hebei China Fortune	(Argentina) Ezequiel Lavezzi	(Argentina) Javier Mascherano	(Brazil) Hernanes	(Morocco) **Ayoub El Kaabi**		(Ivory Coast) Gervinho
Henan Jianye	(Brazil) **Fernando Karanga**	(Brazil) **Ivo**	(Cameroon) Christian Bassogog	(Portugal) Ricardo Vaz Tê		(Portugal) Orlando Sá (Spain) Cala
Jiangsu Suning	(Brazil) Alex Teixeira	(Italy) **Éder**	(Italy) Gabriel Paletta			(Brazil) Ramires (Ghana) Richmond Boakye
Shandong Luneng Taishan	(Brazil) Diego Tardelli	(Brazil) Gil	(Brazil) **Róger Guedes**	(Italy) Graziano Pellè		(Senegal) Papiss Cissé
Shanghai Greenland Shenhua	(Colombia) Fredy Guarín	(Colombia) Giovanni Moreno	(Paraguay) Óscar Romero	(Senegal) **Demba Ba**		(Nigeria) Obafemi Martins
Shanghai SIPG	(Brazil) Elkeson	(Brazil) Hulk	(Brazil) Oscar	(Uzbekistan) Odil Ahmedov		
Tianjin Quanjian	(Brazil) Alexandre Pato	(France) Anthony Modeste	(South Korea) Kwon Kyung-won			(Belgium) Axel Witsel
Tianjin TEDA	(Brazil) Johnathan Goiano	(Germany) Felix Bastians	(Ghana) Frank Acheampong	(Nigeria) Mikel John Obi		

- **^1** For Hong Kong, Macau, or Taiwanese players, if they are non-naturalized and were registered as professional footballers in Hong Kong's, Macau's, or Chinese Taipei's football association for the first time, they are recognized as native players. Otherwise they are recognized as foreign players.
- **^2** Festus Baise is a naturalized citizen of Hong Kong SAR; however, since his first registered football association was Hong Kong and is the passport holder of Hong Kong SAR, he would be considered as a native player.
- **^3** Player that has returned from a loan spell. It is unsure whether they will be registered for the season or sent out on loan again, but they are now on the wage bills of their respective clubs.

== League table ==
Pos	Team	Pld	W	D	L	GF	GA	GD	Pts	Qualification or relegation
1	Shanghai SIPG (C)	30	21	5	4	77	33	+44	68	Qualification to Champions League group stage
2	Guangzhou Evergrande Taobao	30	20	3	7	82	36	+46	63	Qualification to Champions League group stage
3	Shandong Luneng Taishan	30	17	7	6	57	39	+18	58	Qualification to Champions League play-off round
4	Beijing Sinobo Guoan (Note: Beijing Sinobo Guoan qualified for the 2019 AFC Champions League group stage as 2018 Chinese FA Cup winners.)	30	15	8	7	64	45	+19	53	Qualification to Champions League group stage
5	Jiangsu Suning	30	13	9	8	48	33	+15	48	
6	Hebei China Fortune	30	10	9	11	46	50	−4	39	
7	Shanghai Greenland Shenhua	30	10	8	12	44	53	−9	38	
8	Beijing Renhe	30	9	10	11	33	46	−13	37	
9	Tianjin Quanjian	30	9	9	12	41	48	−7	36 (Note: Tianjin Quanjian is ahead of Guangzhou R&F on head-to-head points: Tianjin Quanjian 2–1 Guangzhou R&F, Guangzhou R&F 2–6 Tianjin Quanjian.)	
10	Guangzhou R&F	30	10	6	14	49	61	−12	36	
11	Dalian Yifang	30	10	5	15	37	57	−20	35	
12	Henan Jianye	30	10	4	16	30	45	−15	34	
13	Chongqing Dangdai Lifan	30	8	8	14	40	46	−6	32 (Note: Chongqing Dangdai Lifan, Tianjin TEDA and Changchun Yatai were ranked by head-to-head points: Chongqing Dangdai Lifan 7 pts, Tianjin Teda 5 pts, Changchun Yatai 4 pts.)	
14	Tianjin TEDA	30	8	8	14	41	54	−13	32	
15	Changchun Yatai (R)	30	8	8	14	45	56	−11	32	Relegation to League One
16	Guizhou Hengfeng (R)	30	7	3	20	34	66	−32	24	Relegation to League One

Source: League table
Rules for classification: 1) Points; 2) Head-to-head points; 3) Head-to-head goal difference; 4) Head-to-head goals scored; 5) Reserve league points; 6) U19 Elite league points; 7) Goal difference; 8) Goals scored; 9) Disciplinary points (1 point for each yellow card, 3 points for each red card); 10) Draw
(C) Champions; (R) Relegated

== Results ==
Home \ Away	BJR	BJS	CC	CQ	DLY	GZE	GZF	GZZ	HBC	HN	JSS	SD	SGS	SSI	TJQ	TJT
Beijing Renhe	—	3–0	1–3	1–1	3–1	2–0	0–0	2–1	0–2	1–0	0–2	0–0	0–2	1–5	3–3	1–0
Beijing Sinobo Guoan	4–0	—	1–1	2–1	5–2	2–2	2–2	4–3	6–3	2–1	3–1	1–1	3–1	0–1	3–2	1–1
Changchun Yatai	1–1	0–2	—	1–2	3–0	3–2	1–2	3–0	2–2	3–0	2–5	1–2	1–1	2–1	2–2	0–1
Chongqing Dangdai Lifan	1–0	3–3	1–2	—	1–1	2–0	0–1	3–4	4–4	1–0	4–1	0–2	0–1	2–3	0–1	1–1
Dalian Yifang	1–2	0–3	2–0	2–2	—	3–0	3–0	2–1	0–0	2–1	3–1	4–3	2–1	1–0	1–1	2–3
Guangzhou Evergrande Taobao	6–1	1–0	5–0	5–0	3–0	—	4–5	4–0	2–2	1–0	1–0	1–0	2–1	4–5	5–0	5–1
Guangzhou R&F	4–1	0–3	5–2	1–1	2–0	2–4	—	1–1	2–1	1–1	0–2	2–4	4–2	2–5	2–6	2–0
Guizhou Hengfeng	1–1	3–2	2–5	1–0	3–0	0–3	0–2	—	2–3	1–2	1–3	3–1	0–1	1–1	0–1	1–0
Hebei China Fortune	0–0	2–1	2–1	2–1	3–2	0–3	2–2	1–0	—	0–1	0–0	1–2	4–1	1–1	2–0	1–2
Henan Jianye	1–0	2–0	1–1	0–2	1–1	0–5	2–0	4–0	2–0	—	0–1	1–4	2–2	1–2	0–4	1–0
Jiangsu Suning	0–0	1–2	2–0	0–0	1–0	2–3	2–0	3–1	3–1	4–0	—	1–1	5–1	0–0	1–1	2–1
Shandong Luneng Taishan	1–1	3–0	2–0	2–0	2–0	1–4	2–1	0–2	3–1	2–1	3–2	—	3–1	1–1	3–2	2–0
Shanghai Greenland Shenhua	1–3	2–2	1–1	2–1	1–0	2–2	3–1	3–1	4–2	0–2	1–1	2–2	—	0–2	1–1	1–0
Shanghai SIPG	2–1	1–2	3–1	2–1	8–0	2–1	3–1	5–0	2–0	2–1	2–0	4–2	2–0	—	4–1	1–1
Tianjin Quanjian	1–2	0–0	2–0	0–3	0–1	0–1	2–1	1–0	0–3	1–2	1–1	1–1	2–1	3–2	—	0–0
Tianjin TEDA	2–2	2–5	3–3	1–2	3–1	0–3	2–1	5–1	1–1	2–0	1–1	1–2	2–4	2–5	3–2	—

Source: Results
Legend: Blue = home team win; Yellow = draw; Red = away team win.
For upcoming matches, an "a" indicates there is an article about the rivalry between the two participants.

== Positions by round ==
To preserve chronological evolvements, any postponed matches are not included to the round at which they were originally scheduled, but added to the full round they were played immediately afterwards. For example, if a match is scheduled for round 7, but then played between rounds 8 and 9, it will be added to the standings for round 8.

Team ╲ Round	1	2	3	4	5	6	7	8	9	10	11	12	13	14	15	16	17	18	19	20	21	22	23	24	25	26	27	28	29	30
Shanghai SIPG	1	1	1	1	1	1	1	1	2	2	1	2	3	3	3	3	3	3	2	2	2	1	1	1	1	1	1	1	1	1
Guangzhou Evergrande Taobao	11	5	3	2	2	2	3	3	4	5	5	4	4	4	4	4	4	4	4	3	3	2	2	2	2	2	2	2	2	2
Shandong Luneng Taishan	3	2	2	4	5	3	2	2	1	1	2	3	2	2	2	2	2	2	3	4	4	4	4	3	3	3	3	3	3	3
Beijing Sinobo Guoan	14	10	5	3	3	5	5	4	3	3	3	1	1	1	1	1	1	1	1	1	1	3	3	4	4	4	4	4	4	4
Jiangsu Suning	4	7	12	8	6	6	4	6	5	4	4	5	5	5	5	5	5	5	5	5	5	5	5	5	5	5	5	5	5	5
Hebei China Fortune	7	4	8	10	9	11	11	8	10	9	9	9	10	10	10	12	10	11	10	11	9	6	6	6	8	7	7	7	7	6
Shanghai Greenland Shenhua	7	13	10	6	4	4	6	5	7	6	7	6	6	6	7	6	7	6	6	9	10	11	13	7	6	6	6	6	6	7
Beijing Renhe	12	9	9	11	13	10	10	10	8	10	8	10	7	8	9	10	11	12	11	6	7	9	9	8	7	8	8	8	8	8
Tianjin Quanjian	2	6	11	13	10	12	13	13	11	11	11	7	8	7	8	9	8	9	12	8	8	10	11	13	13	13	10	9	11	9
Guangzhou R&F	5	3	6	5	7	7	9	7	6	7	6	8	9	9	6	7	9	10	8	10	6	8	7	9	11	11	12	11	9	10
Dalian Yifang	16	16	16	16	16	16	15	15	15	15	15	15	15	15	15	15	14	14	13	13	13	13	10	11	9	9	9	10	15	11
Henan Jianye	15	11	13	12	12	14	14	14	14	14	14	14	14	12	13	13	13	13	14	14	14	15	15	15	15	15	15	13	10	12
Chongqing Dangdai Lifan	6	8	4	7	8	9	7	9	13	13	13	13	13	14	14	14	15	15	15	15	15	14	14	14	14	14	13	14	13	13
Tianjin TEDA	7	12	7	9	11	8	8	12	9	8	10	11	11	11	11	8	6	7	7	7	11	12	12	12	12	12	14	15	12	14
Changchun Yatai	7	14	14	15	15	13	12	11	12	12	12	12	12	13	12	11	12	8	9	12	12	7	8	10	10	10	11	12	14	15
Guizhou Hengfeng	13	14	15	14	14	15	16	16	16	16	16	16	16	16	16	16	16	16	16	16	16	16	16	16	16	16	16	16	16	16

Leader and qualification to AFC Champions League Group stage
Qualification to AFC Champions League Group stage
Qualification to AFC Champions League Play-off round
Relegation to League One

Source: Results

== Results by match played ==
Team ╲ Round	1	2	3	4	5	6	7	8	9	10	11	12	13	14	15	16	17	18	19	20	21	22	23	24	25	26	27	28	29	30
Beijing Renhe	L	W	D	L	L	W	D	W	D	L	W	D	W	L	L	D	D	L	W	W	D	L	D	D	W	L	L	W	L	D
Beijing Sinobo Guoan	L	W	W	W	D	D	D	W	W	D	W	W	W	D	W	D	W	W	L	W	W	L	L	L	W	D	L	D	W	L
Changchun Yatai	D	L	D	L	L	W	W	W	L	L	L	W	L	L	W	D	W	W	L	D	D	W	L	L	D	D	L	L	D	L
Chongqing Dangdai Lifan	W	L	W	L	D	D	W	L	L	L	L	L	W	L	L	D	L	D	L	D	L	W	D	W	L	D	W	D	W	L
Dalian Yifang	L	L	L	D	D	L	D	L	W	L	W	D	L	L	L	W	W	L	W	D	W	W	W	L	W	L	L	L	L	W
Guangzhou Evergrande Taobao	L	W	W	W	W	D	D	W	L	D	L	W	L	W	W	W	L	W	W	W	W	W	W	W	W	W	W	L	L	W
Guangzhou R&F	W	W	L	W	L	L	L	W	W	D	D	L	D	D	W	L	L	L	W	L	W	L	D	L	L	L	L	W	W	D
Guizhou Hengfeng	L	L	L	W	L	L	L	L	L	D	L	L	D	L	W	L	L	L	W	L	D	L	W	W	L	W	L	L	L	W
Hebei China Fortune	D	W	L	L	W	L	D	W	L	D	W	D	D	D	L	L	W	L	W	D	D	W	W	L	L	D	W	L	L	W
Henan Jianye	L	W	L	D	L	L	L	L	W	W	D	L	D	W	L	W	L	L	L	L	D	L	L	W	L	W	W	W	W	L
Jiangsu Suning	W	L	L	W	W	D	W	L	W	W	L	D	D	D	W	W	L	D	D	W	D	D	L	W	L	D	W	W	L	W
Shandong Luneng Taishan	W	W	W	L	L	W	W	W	D	D	W	D	W	D	W	D	W	W	L	L	L	W	W	D	W	W	L	W	W	D
Shanghai Greenland Shenhua	D	L	W	W	W	D	L	W	L	W	L	W	D	D	L	D	L	W	L	L	L	D	L	W	W	D	W	L	L	D
Shanghai SIPG	W	W	W	W	W	W	D	L	L	D	W	D	W	W	W	L	W	W	W	W	D	W	W	W	W	D	W	W	W	L
Tianjin Quanjian	W	L	L	L	W	D	D	L	W	D	W	W	L	W	L	L	D	D	L	W	D	L	L	L	L	D	W	D	D	W
Tianjin TEDA	D	L	W	L	D	W	D	L	W	W	L	L	L	W	L	W	W	D	D	L	L	L	D	L	D	L	L	D	W	L

Source: Results
W = Win; D = Draw; L = Loss

== Player statistics ==
=== Top scorers ===
Rank	Player	Club	Goals
1	(China) Wu Lei	Shanghai SIPG	27
2	(Nigeria) Odion Ighalo	Changchun Yatai	21
3	(Israel) Eran Zahavi	Guangzhou R&F	20
4	(Democratic Republic of the Congo) Cédric Bakambu	Beijing Sinobo Guoan	19
5	(Brazil) Diego Tardelli	Shandong Luneng Taishan	17
5	(Ghana) Frank Acheampong	Tianjin TEDA	17
7	(Brazil) Alan Kardec	Chongqing Dangdai Lifan	16
7	(Brazil) Talisca	Guangzhou Evergrande Taobao	16
7	(Italy) Graziano Pellè	Shandong Luneng Taishan	16
10	(Brazil) Alexandre Pato	Tianjin Quanjian	15
10	(Zimbabwe) Nyasha Mushekwi	Dalian Yifang	15

=== Top assists ===
Rank	Player	Club	Assists
1	(Brazil) Oscar	Shanghai SIPG	19
2	(Brazil) Renato Augusto	Beijing Sinobo Guoan	13
3	(Brazil) Hulk	Shanghai SIPG	12
4	(China) Yu Hanchao	Guangzhou Evergrande Taobao	11
5	(Spain) Jonathan Viera	Beijing Sinobo Guoan	10
6	(China) Wu Lei	Shanghai SIPG	8
6	(Israel) Eran Zahavi	Guangzhou R&F	8
6	(Italy) Graziano Pellè	Shandong Luneng Taishan	8
9	(Argentina) Ezequiel Lavezzi	Hebei China Fortune	7
9	(Argentina) Nicolás Gaitán	Dalian Yifang	7
9	(China) Fan Yunlong	Guizhou Hengfeng	7
9	(China) Jiang Zhipeng	Hebei China Fortune	7
9	(China) Jin Jingdao	Shandong Luneng Taishan	7
9	(China) Peng Xinli	Chongqing Dangdai Lifan	7
9	(China) Zhang Chengdong	Hebei China Fortune	7
9	(Italy) Éder	Jiangsu Suning	7

=== Hat-tricks ===
Player	For	Against	Result	Date	Ref
(Brazil) Alan	Guangzhou Evergrande Taobao	Guangzhou R&F	4–5	2 March 2018	
(Israel) Eran Zahavi	Guangzhou R&F	Guangzhou Evergrande Taobao	5–4	2 March 2018	
(Brazil) Oscar	Shanghai SIPG	Dalian Yifang	8–0	3 March 2018	
(China) Wu Lei	Shanghai SIPG	Dalian Yifang	8–0	3 March 2018	
(China) Wu Lei^{4}	Shanghai SIPG	Guangzhou R&F	5–2	18 March 2018	
(Ghana) Frank Acheampong	Tianjin TEDA	Tianjin Quanjian	3–2	18 March 2018	
(Nigeria) Obafemi Martins	Shanghai Greenland Shenhua	Hebei China Fortune	4–2	31 March 2018	
(Nigeria) Odion Ighalo^{4}	Changchun Yatai	Guizhou Hengfeng	5–2	21 April 2018	
(The Gambia) Bubacarr Trawally	Guizhou Hengfeng	Beijing Sinobo Guoan	3–4	29 April 2018	
(Brazil) Talisca	Guangzhou Evergrande Taobao	Guizhou Hengfeng	4–0	18 July 2018	
(Brazil) Alan Kardec	Chongqing Dangdai Lifan	Guizhou Hengfeng	3–4	1 August 2018	
(Spain) Jonathan Soriano	Beijing Sinobo Guoan	Hebei China Fortune	6–3	2 August 2018	
(Zimbabwe) Nyasha Mushekwi	Dalian Yifang	Guangzhou R&F	3–0	10 August 2018	
(Brazil) Renato Augusto	Beijing Sinobo Guoan	Tianjin TEDA	5–2	25 August 2018	
(China) Dong Xuesheng	Hebei China Fortune	Chongqing Dangdai Lifan	4–4	20 October 2018	
(Brazil) Alexandre Pato	Tianjin Quanjian	Guangzhou R&F	6–2	27 October 2018	

== Awards ==
The awards of 2018 Chinese Super League were announced on 21 November 2018.

Award	Winner	Club	Ref
Player of the Season	(China) Wu Lei	Shanghai SIPG	
Golden Boot	(China) Wu Lei	Shanghai SIPG	
Goalkeeper of the Season	(China) Yan Junling	Shanghai SIPG	
Young Player of the Season	(China) Huang Zichang	Jiangsu Suning	
Manager of the Season	(China) Li Xiaopeng	Shandong Luneng Taishan	
Best Referee	(China) Zhang Lei	–	
Best Assistant Referee	(China) Huo Weiming	–	
Most Popular Player	(China) Jin Jingdao	Shandong Luneng Taishan	

Team of the Year
Goalkeeper	(China) Yan Junling (Shanghai SIPG)			
Defender	(China) Wang Tong (Shandong Luneng Taishan)	(China) Feng Xiaoting (Guangzhou Evergrande Taobao)	(China) Zhang Linpeng (Guangzhou Evergrande Taobao)	(China) Li Xuepeng (Guangzhou Evergrande Taobao)
Midfielder	(China) Huang Zichang (Jiangsu Suning)	(Brazil) Paulinho (Guangzhou Evergrande Taobao)	(Brazil) Oscar (Shanghai SIPG)	(China) Jin Jingdao (Shandong Luneng Taishan)
Forward	(China) Wu Lei (Shanghai SIPG)		(Brazil) Hulk (Shanghai SIPG)	

== League attendance ==
Pos	Team	Total	High	Low	Average	Change
1	Guangzhou Evergrande Taobao	705,025	49,967	32,796	47,002	+3.1%
2	Beijing Sinobo Guoan	626,152	56,544	30,699	41,743	+20.4%
3	Dalian Yifang	497,171	51,666	20,197	33,145	+60.9%^{†}
4	Jiangsu Suning	487,617	50,973	21,428	32,508	−0.6%
5	Chongqing Dangdai Lifan	486,516	42,856	23,658	32,434	−5.8%
6	Shandong Luneng Taishan	371,768	42,035	14,019	24,785	−18.2%
7	Shanghai SIPG	324,470	25,378	18,998	21,631	−25.9%
8	Shanghai Greenland Shenhua	322,155	23,928	20,012	21,477	+12.9%
9	Tianjin Quanjian	294,984	25,815	6,178	19,666	−20.9%
10	Changchun Yatai	282,286	27,682	10,127	18,819	+14.2%
11	Henan Jianye	276,021	21,899	13,966	18,401	−2.8%
12	Tianjin TEDA	265,745	31,607	8,566	17,716	+21.9%
13	Guizhou Hengfeng	250,552	28,573	9,117	16,703	−20.8%
14	Hebei China Fortune	240,429	25,866	10,113	16,029	−11.2%
15	Beijing Renhe	188,004	27,289	5,651	12,534	+93.0%^{†}
16	Guangzhou R&F	153,820	12,996	7,311	10,255	+3.5%
	League total	5,772,715	56,544	5,651	24,053	+1.2%

Updated to games played on 11 November 2018
Source: League attendance
Notes:
^{†} Teams played previous season in CL1.
