= 1999 Chinese FA Cup =

1999 The Chinese Football Association Cup
CFA Cup

Tournament details
- Country: China
- Teams: 26

Final positions
- Champions: Shandong Luneng Taishan (2nd title)
- Runners-up: Dalian Wanda Shide
- Asian Cup Winners' Cup: Dalian Wanda Shide (Note: Shandong Luneng Taishan won the league and cup Double in the season and qualified for the 2000–01 Asian Club Championship.)

Tournament statistics
- Matches played: 50
- Goals scored: 132 (2.64 per match)
- Top goal scorer(s): (South Africa) Mark Williams (6 goals)

Awards
- Best player: (China) Su Maozhen

The PHILIPS 1999 China FA Cup (Chinese: 1999飞利浦中国足球协会杯) was the 5th edition of Chinese FA Cup after professional football league was established in China. The cup title sponsor was Philips.

== Results ==
=== First round ===
==== First leg ====
18 April	Jilin Aodong	3 – 1	Shaanxi Guoli	Yanji People's Stadium, Yanji
14:00	Tene 14'; Wang Haibo 60'; Song Xiaoyu 90'		Sun Feng 45'

18 April	Guangzhou Matsunichi	1 – 1	Wuhan Hongtao K	Guangdong Provincial People's Stadium, Guangzhou
15:00	Li Zifei 25'		Li Hao 86'

18 April	Beijing Kuanli	0 – 0	Bayi Jinsui	Xiannongtan Stadium, Beijing
15:00

18 April	Chongqing Hongyan	2 – 1	Chengdu Wuniu	Datianwan Stadium, Chongqing
15:30	Jung Kwang-se 8'; Li Guoxu 89'		Chang Weiwei 71'

18 April	Shanghai Pudong Whirlpool	0 – 2	Qingdao Hainiu	Chuansha Stadium, Shanghai
15:30			Mambwe 20'; Valverde 46'

18 April	Guangzhou Baiyunshan	2 – 0	Chongqing Longxin	Xingzhong Stadium, Zhongshan
15:30	Katalay 68', 87'

18 April	Jiangsu Gige	1 – 1	Guangzhou Apollo	Xuzhou Stadium, Xuzhou
15:30	Lu Yiliang 16'		Yuan Junhui 39'

18 April	Xiamen Fairwiell	3 – 0	Tianjin Teda	Xiamen Stadium, Xiamen
15:30	Agbo 30', 40'; Tang Xiaocheng 56'

18 April	Shenzhen Ping'an Insurance	3 – 2	Guangdong Hongyuan	Shenzhen Stadium, Shenzhen
15:30	Xie Feng 12'; Pukelevičius 15'; Zhang Jun 65'		Li Haiqiang 46'; Grujić 72'

18 April	Yunnan Hongta	2 – 0	Shenyang Haishi	Yuxi Stadium, Yuxi
15:45	Xu Dongyan 25'; Chang Hui 88'

==== Second leg ====
16 May	Chengdu Wuniu	2 – 2 (a.e.t.) (3 - 4 agg.)	Chongqing Hongyan	Leshan Stadium, Leshan
15:00	Chen Yuankun 45'; Marcos 85'		Mugeyi 43'; Liu Wei 118'

16 May	Chongqing Longxin	4 – 0 (4 – 2 agg.)	Guangzhou Baiyunshan	Yanghe Stadium, Chongqing
15:00	Qiu Weiguo 23'; Jiang Feng 40'; Zhao Lichun 65'; Gao Feng 90+1'

16 May	Qingdao Hainiu	1 – 0 (3 – 0 agg.)	Shanghai Pudong Whirlpool	Weifang Stadium, Weifang
15:30	Qiao Lun 8' (pen.)

16 May	Tianjin Teda	0 – 1 (0 – 4 agg.)	Xiamen Fairwiell	Minyuan Stadium, Tianjin
15:30			Osvaldo 83'

16 May	Wuhan Hongtao K	3 – 1 (4 – 2 agg.)	Guangzhou Matsunichi	Ezhou Stadium, Ezhou
15:30	Li Gang 28'; Li Hao 33'; Li Xiao 53'		Hu Zhijun 84'

16 May	Bayi Jinsui	0 – 0 (4 – 0 agg.)	Beijing Kuanli	Xinxiang Stadium, Xinxiang
15:30	Wang Shuolong 11'; Pan Yi 43'; Tao Peng 52', 87'

16 May	Shaanxi Guoli	0 – 0 (1 – 3 agg.)	Jilin Aodong	Shaanxi Province Stadium, Xi'an
15:30

16 May	Shenyang Haishi	1 – 3 (1 – 5 agg.)	Yunnan Hongta	Wulihe Stadium, Shenyang
15:30	Du Ping 43' (pen.)		Dong Junpeng 35'; Camara 45', 65' (pen.)

16 May	Guangdong Hongyuan	4 – 1 (6 – 4 agg.)	Shenzhen Ping'an Insurance	Liuzhou Stadium, Liuzhou
20:00	Šimičić 43', 89'; Carlos 58'; Yao Debiao 80'		Xie Feng 64'

23 May	Guangzhou Apollo	3 – 0 (4 – 1 agg.)	Jiangsu Gige	Zhuhai Stadium, Zhuhai
16:00	Tan Weiming 61', 75'; Yuan Junhui 67'

=== Second round ===
==== First leg ====
23 May	Chongqing Hongyan	0 – 2	Shanghai Shenhua	Datianwan Stadium, Chongqing

23 May	Qingdao Hainiu	1 – 0	Chongqing Longxin	Weifang Stadium, Weifang

23 May	Xiamen Fairwiell	0 – 1	Dalian Wanda Shide	Xiamen Stadium, Xiamen

23 May	Wuhan Hongtao K	1 – 3	Shandong Luneng Taishan	Ezhou Stadium, Ezhou

23 May	Guangdong Hongyuan	0 – 3	Beijing Guoan	Liuzhou Stadium, Liuzhou

23 May	Jilin Aodong	5 – 0	Bayi Jinsui	Yanji People's Stadium, Yanji

23 May	Yunnan Hongta	1 – 0	Liaoning FC	Yuxi Stadium, Yuxi

29 May	Guangzhou Apollo	1 – 1	Sichuan Quanxing Langjiu	Zhuhai Stadium, Zhuhai

==== Second leg ====
30 May	Shanghai Shenhua	6 – 0 (8 - 0 agg.)	Chongqing Hongyan	Shanghai Stadium, Shanghai

30 May	Chongqing Longxin	7 – 0 (7 - 1 agg.)	Qingdao Hainiu	Yanghe Stadium, Chongqing

30 May	Dalian Wanda Shide	2 – 0 (3 - 0 agg.)	Xiamen Fairwiell	Jinzhou Stadium, Dalian

30 May	Shandong Luneng Taishan	3 – 0 (6 - 1 agg.)	Wuhan Hongtao K	Zibo Stadium, Zibo

30 May	Beijing Guoan	5 – 2 (8 - 2 agg.)	Guangdong Hongyuan	Workers Stadium, Beijing

30 May	Bayi Jinsui	2 – 0 (2 - 5 agg.)	Jilin Aodong	Xinxiang Stadium, Xinxiang

30 May	Liaoning FC	0 – 0 (0 - 1 agg.)	Yunnan Hongta	Leifeng Stadium, Fushun

2 June	Sichuan Quanxing Langjiu	3 – 0 (4 - 1 agg.)	Guangzhou Apollo	Deyang Stadium, Deyang
17:40

=== Third round ===
==== First leg ====
5 June	Beijing Guoan	0 – 0	Shandong Luneng Taishan	Workers Stadium, Beijing

6 June	Chongqing Longxin	2 – 3	Shanghai Shenhua	Yanghe Stadium, Chongqing

6 June	Sichuan Quanxing Langjiu	0 – 0	Dalian Wanda Shide	Chengdu Stadium, Chengdu

6 June	Jilin Aodong	1 – 1	Yunnan Hongta	Yanji People's Stadium, Yanji

==== Second leg ====
11 July	Yunnan Hongta	1 – 2 (a.e.t.) (2 - 3 agg.)	Jilin Aodong	Yuxi Stadium, Yuxi
15:45

11 July	Shanghai Shenhua	3 – 1 (6 - 3 agg.)	Chongqing Longxin	Shanghai Stadium, Shanghai
15:55

11 July	Shandong Luneng Taishan	1 – 0 (1 - 0 agg.)	Beijing Guoan	Zibo Stadium, Zibo
16:00

11 July	Dalian Wanda Shide	1 – 0 (a.e.t.) (1 - 0 agg.)	Sichuan Quanxing Langjiu	Jinzhou Stadium, Dalian
16:30

=== Semi-finals ===
==== First leg ====
19 September	Dalian Wanda Shide	0 – 1	Shanghai Shenhua	Jinzhou Stadium, Dalian

19 September	Shandong Luneng Taishan	0 – 0	Jilin Aodong	Zibo Stadium, Zibo

==== Second leg ====
26 September	Shanghai Shenhua	0 – 2 (a.e.t.) (1 - 2 agg.)	Dalian Wanda Shide	Shanghai Stadium, Shanghai

26 September	Jilin Aodong	1 – 1 (1 - 1 agg.)	Shandong Luneng Taishan	Yanji People's Stadium, Yanji

=== Finals ===
==== First leg ====
9 December	Dalian Wanda Shide	1 – 1	Shandong Luneng Taishan	Dalian People's Stadium, Dalian

==== Second leg ====
22 December	Shandong Luneng Taishan	3 – 2 (4 - 3 agg.)	Dalian Wanda Shide	Shandong Provincial Stadium, Jinan
