= 1999 Chinese Jia-A League =

Chinese Jia-A League
- Season: 1999
- Champions: Shandong Luneng
- Relegated: Guangzhou Songri; Wuhan Hongtao K
- Asian Club Championship: Shandong Luneng
- Matches: 182
- Goals: 428 (2.35 per match)
- Top goalscorer: Qu Shengqing (17 goals)
- Average attendance: 19,909

The 1999 Chinese Jia-A League season, also known as Pepsi Chinese Jia-A League for sponsorship reasons, was the sixth season of professional association football and the 38th top-tier overall league season in China. It was started on March 21 and ended on December 5. The league saw Shandong Luneng win the championship.

== Promotion and relegation ==
Teams promoted from 1998 Chinese Jia-B League

- Tianjin TEDA
- Liaoning Tianrun (renamed Liaoning Fushun)

Teams relegated from 1998 Chinese Jia-A League

- August 1st
- Guangzhou Apollo

== Personnel ==
Team	Manager
Beijing Guoan	(China) Shen Xiangfu
Chongqing Longxin	(South Korea) Lee Jang-soo
Dalian Shide	(China) Xu Genbao
Guangzhou Songri	(Brazil) Ademar Braga
Jilin Aodong	(China) Gao Hui
Liaoning Fushun	(China) Zhang Yin
Qingdao Yizhong Hainiu	(South Korea) Kim Jung-nam
Shandong Luneng	(Federal Republic of Yugoslavia) Slobodan Santrač
Shanghai Shenhua	(Brazil) Sebastião Lazaroni
Shenyang Haishi	(China) Li Qiang
Shenzhen Pingan	(South Korea) Cha Bum-kun
Sichuan Quanxing	(Brazil) Edson Tavares
Tianjin TEDA	(China) Jin Zhiyang
Wuhan Hongtao K	(Federal Republic of Yugoslavia) Milorad Kosanović

== Foreign players ==
Club	Player 1	Player 2	Player 3	Former players
Beijing Guoan	(Federal Republic of Yugoslavia) Petar Čestić	(Paraguay) Casiano Delvalle	(Uruguay) Alejandro Larrea	(Hungary) Mihály Mracskó (Netherlands) Remco Torken
Chongqing Longxin	(England) Paul Rideout	(South Africa) Brian Sebapole	(South Africa) Mark Williams	(Democratic Republic of the Congo) Patrick Katalay
Dalian Shide	(Czech Republic) Václav Němeček	(Iran) Reza Shahroudi	(Sweden) Peter Eriksson	(Namibia) Eliphas Shivute
Guangzhou Songri	(Uruguay) Leonardo Jara	(Uruguay) Tony Gómez		(Egypt) Ehab Galal
Jilin Aodong	(Cameroon) Olivier Blaise	(Democratic Republic of the Congo) Bulayima Mukuayanzo	(Democratic Republic of the Congo) Zola Kiniambi	(Rwanda) Claude Kalisa
Liaoning Fushun	(France) Christophe Galtier	(France) Fabrice Grange	(South Korea) Choi Young-il	
Qingdao Yizhong Hainiu	(Brazil) William Fabro	(Uruguay) Carim Adippe	(Zambia) James Phiri	(Bulgaria) Dimitar Ivanov (Zambia) Sidney Mambwe
Shandong Luneng	(Federal Republic of Yugoslavia) Dejan Batrović	(Federal Republic of Yugoslavia) Saša Petrović	(Uruguay) Luis Romero	(Bosnia and Herzegovina) Dragan Glogovac
Shanghai Shenhua	(Brazil) Guido	(Brazil) Júlio César	(Brazil) Marcelo Sergipano	(Brazil) Edvaldo (Brazil) Moreno (Cameroon) David Embé
Shenyang Haishi	(Brazil) Paulinho	(Cameroon) Tobie Mimboe	(South Korea) Seo Hyo-won	(United States) Jerry Laterza
Shenzhen Pingan	(Lithuania) Arūnas Pukelevičius	(Lithuania) Vytautas Karvelis		(Cameroon) Bertin Tomou (South Korea) Cho Jung-hyun
Sichuan Quanxing	(Brazil) Fábio Magrão	(Brazil) Marcelo Marmelo	(Colombia) Ricardo Pérez	(Morocco) Abdeljalil El Hajji (Saudi Arabia) Fuad Anwar
Tianjin TEDA	(Uruguay) Gustavo Matosas	(Uruguay) Juan Ferreri	(Uruguay) Raúl Falero	(Uruguay) Adrián Paz
Wuhan Hongtao K	(Brazil) Gerson	(France) Maxime Poisson	(Morocco) Abdelmajid Bouyboud	(Belarus) Sergey Vekhtev (Burundi) Michel Minko (Croatia) Zoran Sedlar

== League standings ==
Pos	Team	Pld	W	D	L	GF	GA	GD	Pts	Qualification or relegation
1	Shandong Luneng	26	13	9	4	33	13	+20	48	2000–01 Asian Club Championship qualification
2	Liaoning Fushun	26	13	8	5	42	24	+18	47	
3	Sichuan Quanxing	26	12	9	5	38	20	+18	45	
4	Chongqing Longxin	26	10	10	6	40	27	+13	40	
5	Shanghai Shenhua	26	9	11	6	26	25	+1	38	
6	Beijing Guoan	26	9	9	8	38	25	+13	36	
7	Tianjin TEDA	26	8	11	7	32	28	+4	35	
8	Jilin Aodong	26	8	9	9	27	40	−13	33	
9	Dalian Shide	26	7	10	9	30	30	0	31	
10	Qingdao Yizhong Hainiu	26	8	6	12	30	36	−6	30	
11	Shenyang Haishi	26	5	13	8	28	32	−4	28	
12	Shenzhen Pingan	26	7	7	12	22	39	−17	28	
13	Guangzhou Songri	26	7	6	13	24	36	−12	27	Relegated to Jia-B League
14	Wuhan Hongtao K	26	3	8	15	18	53	−35	17	Relegated to Jia-B League

Source: rsssf.com

== Awards ==
Player of the year (Golden Ball Award)

- Qu Shengqing (Liaoning Fushun)

Top scorer (Golden Boot Award)

- Su Maozhen (Shandong Luneng)

Manager of the year

- Slobodan Santrač (Shandong Luneng)

Best Referee

- Zhang Baohua (Tianjin TEDA)

Youth player of the year

- Zhang Xiaorui (Tianjin TEDA)

Fair play team

- Shenzhen Pingan

CFA Team of the Year

Goalkeeper: Gao Jianbin (Sichuan Quanxing)
Defence: Cheng Gang (Qingdao Yizhong Hainiu), Li Weifeng (Shenzhen Pingan), Zhang Enhua (Dalian Shide), Xie Feng (Shenzhen Pingan)
Midfield: Zhang Xiaorui (Tianjin TEDA), Li Tie (Liaoning Fushun), Ma Mingyu (Sichuan Quanxing), Li Xiaopeng (Shandong Luneng)
Attack: Su Maozhen (Shandong Luneng), Qu Shengqing (Liaoning Fushun)

== Remarks ==
Newcomer Liaoning Fushun was in the race of title into the final round. Shenyang Haishi survived demotion miraculously amid heavy match fixing accusations. Later police investigation shows the game results in the final round were arranged.

== See also ==
- Chinese Jia-A League
- Chinese Super League
- Chinese Football Association Jia League
- Chinese Football Association Yi League
- Chinese FA Cup
- Chinese Football Association
- Football in China
- List of football records in China
- Chinese clubs in the AFC Champions League
