= Ma Dongbo =

Chinese footballer

Ma Dongbo 马东波
Personal information
- Full name: Ma Dongbo
- Date of birth: 19 January 1977 (age 49)
- Place of birth: China
- Height: 1.84 m (6 ft 1/2 in)
- Position: Goalkeeper

Senior career*
Years	Team	Apps	(Gls)
1995–2005	Liaoning FC		
- * Club domestic league appearances and goals

Ma Dongbo (Chinese: 马东波; born 19 January 1977) is a former Chinese goalkeeper who played for Liaoning Zhongyu where he spent ten years at the club.

== Biography ==
Ma Dongbo was drafted into the senior team of Liaoning FC during the 1995 league season as a reserve choice goalkeeper; however, this was the same season in which the team were relegated after they finished bottom of the league. Ma Dongbo remained loyal towards the club and would remain a loyal servant towards the team that would eventually win promotion back to the top tier in the 1998 league season after coming second in the division and promotion back into the Chinese Jia-A League. While he was part of the squad that came runners-up during the 1999 league season he would only really start to establish himself within the 2002 league season when he finally started to become the club's first choice goalkeeper. His reign as number one would only last until the 2004 league season when he struggled for form. The following season of 2005 Ma Dongbo was reaffirmed as the club's first choice goalkeeper once again, however his poor form was publicly criticised by the team's coach. Many within the media believed that his poor performances were due to match-fixing, however Ma Dongbo and the club denied this and by the end of the season he would retire from the club.

== Honours ==
Liaoning FC

- Chinese Jia-A League: 1999 (Runners-up)
