= Tianjin derby =

Football rivalries in Tianjin, China

The Tianjin derby (simplified Chinese: 天津德比; pinyin: Tiānjīn Débǐ) is a name given to a football derby contested between any two teams in Tianjin, China. The term specifically refers to individual matches between the teams, but can also be used to describe the general rivalry between the different clubs. As of 2024, Tianjin Jinmen Tiger is the only professional club in Tianjin.

== Clubs ==
As of 2027 season, there are one club in the Chinese Super League, China League One and China League Two that play in Tianjin:

- Tianjin Jinmen Tiger F.C. (Super League)

Tianjin Huochetou F.C., established in 1950, is a former professional football club based in Tianjin with the longest history in the city, other former clubs in the highest league include Tianjin Tianhai F.C.(CSL 2017–2019). Tianjin Vanke F.C.(Jia B 1997), Tianjin Lifei F.C.(Jia B 2001), Tianjin Runyulong F.C.(China League One 2011) were formerly in the second-tier league.

== Jinmen Tiger-Huochetou Derbies ==
#	Date	Competition	Home team	Result	Away team	Location
1	1951.12.5	National Football Championship	North China	3-2	Railways	Tianjin
2	1953.2.25	National Football Championship	Railways	1-1	North China	Shanghai
3	1957.3.21	National League Division 1	Huochetou	1-2	Tianjin	Tianjin
4	1957.11.7	National League Division 1	Tianjin	3-0	Huochetou	Tianjin
5	1958.4.23	National League Division 1	Tianjin	0-0	Huochetou	Tianjin
6	1958.10.15	National League Division 1	Huochetou	2-1	Tianjin	Shanghai
7	1961.5.17	National Football Championship	Tianjin	1-0	Huochetou	Tianjin
8	1962.5.8	National League Division 1	Tianjin	1-1	Huochetou	Tianjin
9	1994.6.26	Jia-B League	Tianjin	0-0	Huochetou	Tianjin
10	1994.10.23	Jia-B League	Huochetou	0-0	Tianjin	Tianjin

Statistics as of 23 October 1994.

	Matches	Tianjin (TEDA) wins	Draws	Huochetou wins	Tianjin (TEDA) goals	Huochetou goals
National League Division 1	5	2	2	1	7	4
National Football Championship	3	2	1	0	5	3
Jia-B League	2	0	2	0	0	0
Official matches	10	4	5	1	12	7

== Huochetou-Songjiang "Derbies" ==
#	Date	Competition	Home team	Result	Away team	Location
1	2009.7.3	China League Two	Tianjin Songjiang	1-1	Tianjin Huochetou	Tianjin
2	2009.9.19	China League Two	Tianjin Huochetou	1-0	Tianjin Songjiang	Wuhan

Statistics as of 19 September 2009.

	Matches	Huochetou wins	Draws	Songjiang wins	Huochetou goals	Songjiang goals
China League Two	4	2	1	1	6	2

== Jinmen Tiger-Tianhai Derbies ==
#	Date	Competition	Home team	Result	Away team	Stadium	Attendance
1	2017.5.27	2017 Chinese Super League	Tianjin Quanjian	3-0	Tianjin TEDA	Haihe Educational Football Stadium	25,527
2	2017.9.23	2017 Chinese Super League	Tianjin TEDA	4-1	Tianjin Quanjian	Tianjin Olympic Center Stadium	39,965
3	2018.3.18	2018 Chinese Super League	Tianjin TEDA	3-2	Tianjin Quanjian	Tianjin Olympic Center Stadium	21,666
4	2018.8.15	2018 Chinese Super League	Tianjin Quanjian	0-0	Tianjin TEDA	Haihe Educational Football Stadium	25,815
5	2019.4.13	2019 Chinese Super League	Tianjin TEDA	1-1	Tianjin Tianhai	Tianjin Olympic Center Stadium	31,243
6	2019.7.28	2019 Chinese Super League	Tianjin Tianhai	1-0	Tianjin TEDA	Tianjin Olympic Center Stadium	27,792

=== Statistics ===
Statistics as of 28 July 2019.

	Matches	TEDA wins	Draws	Tianhai wins	TEDA goals	Tianhai goals
Chinese Super League	6	2	2	2	8	8

=== Top goalscorers ===
Below is the list of players who have scored goals in official matches (TEDA VS Tianhai only, former players included).

Position	Name	Team	Goals
1	(Ghana) Frank Acheampong	Tianjin TEDA	5
2	(Brazil) Pato	Tianjin Quanjian	3
3	(China) Zheng Dalun	Tianjin Quanjian	2
4	(China) Li Yuanyi	Tianjin TEDA	1
4	(France) Anthony Modeste	Tianjin Quanjian	1
