= Eduardo Arriola =

Honduran footballer (born 1972)

Personal information
- Full name: Eduardo Alonso Arriola Carter
- Date of birth: 11 October 1972 (age 54)
- Place of birth: Tela, Honduras
- Height: 1.73 m (5 ft 8 in)
- Position: Striker

Senior career*
Years	Team	Apps	(Gls)
1991–1998	Olimpia		
1999	Guangzhou		
2000	Olimpia		
2000–2001	Marathón		
2002–2003	Dragón		(16)
2003	FAS		

International career^{‡}
1994–1997	Honduras	6	(0)
- * Club domestic league appearances and goals ‡ National team caps and goals as of 22 August 2012

Eduardo Alonso Arriola Carter (born 11 October 1972) is a retired Honduran football player.

== Club career ==
He has played for Olimpia, Chinese side Guangzhou Baiyunshan and for FAS and Dragón in El Salvador. In September 2003, while at FAS, he suffered a serious knee injury which would keep him out for at least 8 months.

== International career ==
Arriola made his debut for Honduras in a June 1994 friendly match against Brazil and has earned a total of 6 caps, scoring no goals. He has represented his country at the 1997 UNCAF Nations Cup.

His final international game was an April 1997 UNCAF Nations Cup match against El Salvador.
