= Yanghe Stadium =

Sports venue in Chongqing, China

Coordinates: 29°35′14″N 106°32′0″E

Yanghe Stadium (simplified Chinese: 洋河体育场; traditional Chinese: 洋河體育場) is an abandoned multi-use stadium in Chongqing, People's Republic of China. It was used mostly for football matches. The stadium held 32,000 people, and was the home of Chongqing Lifan in the Chinese Super League.

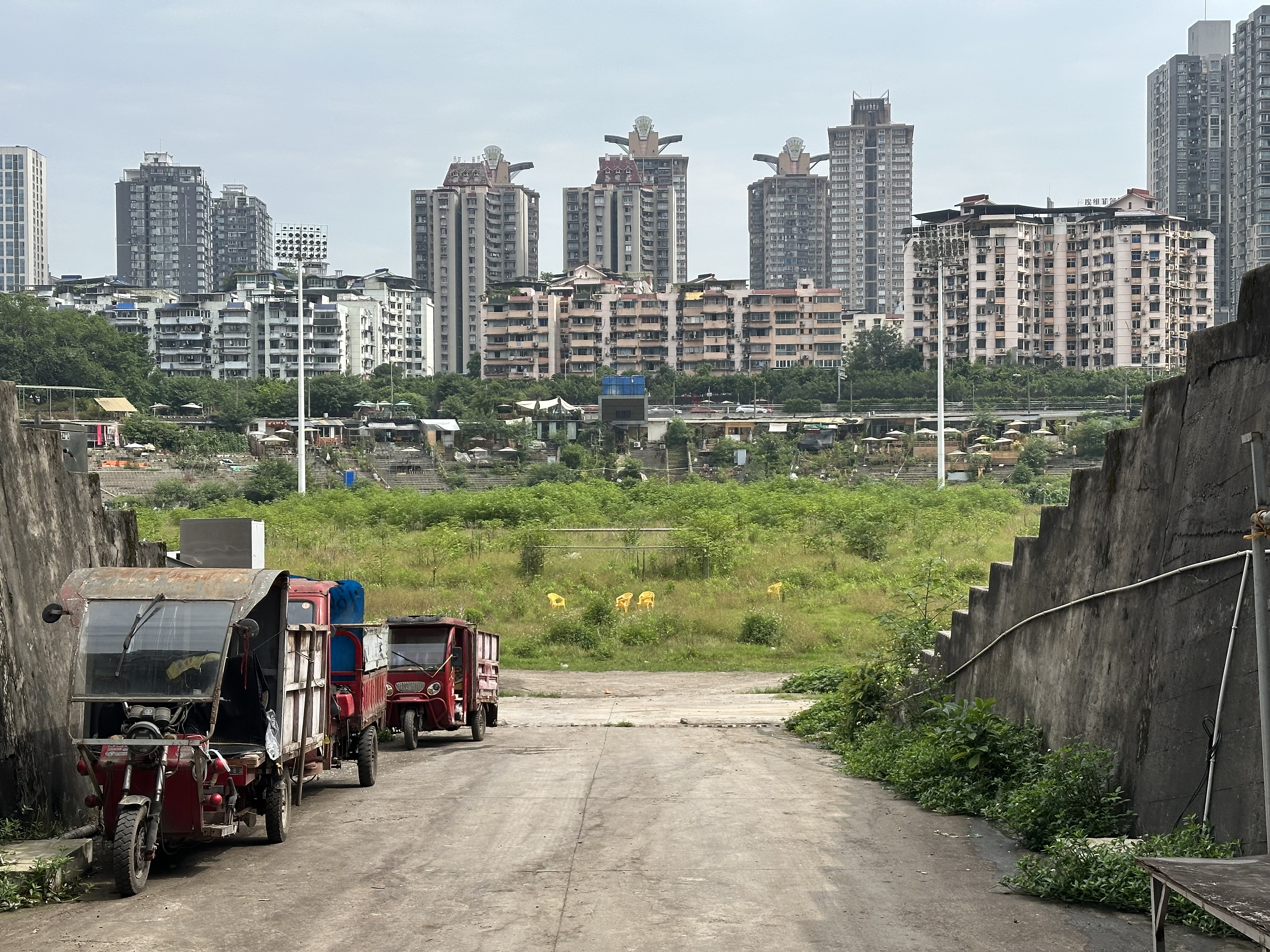
The site of Yanghe Stadium in 2025

The stadium was purchased by the Lifan Group in 2001 for 80 million RMB and immediately replaced Datianwan Stadium as the home group for Chongqing Lifan.
