= Remco Torken =

Dutch footballer

Personal information
- Date of birth: 3 January 1972 (age 54)
- Place of birth: Netherlands
- Position: Striker

Senior career*
Years	Team	Apps	(Gls)
-1993	ADO Den Haag	37+	(2+)
1992/1993	TOP Oss→(loan)		
1993-1995	VVV-Venlo	14	(1)
1994-1995	TOP Oss		
1995-1996/97	K.S.C. Lokeren Oost-Vlaanderen	17+	(6+)
1996/1997	CP Mérida	9	(1)
1997-2001	K.S.K. Beveren	96	(33)
1999	Beijing Sinobo Guoan F.C.→(loan)		
2001-2002	Helmond Sport	29	(4)
2002-2005	Quick Boys		
2005-2007	Ter Leede		
- * Club domestic league appearances and goals

Remco Torken (born 3 January 1972 in the Netherlands) is a Dutch former footballer.
