= Carim Adippe =

Uruguayan footballer (born 1973)

Personal information
- Full name: Carim Danielo Adippe Quijano
- Date of birth: 15 May 1973 (age 53)
- Place of birth: Montevideo, Uruguay
- Height: 1.92 m (6 ft 4 in)
- Position: Forward

Senior career*
Years	Team	Apps	(Gls)
1991–1992	Bella Vista		
1992–1993	Defensor		
1993–1994	Montevideo Wanderers		
1994–1995	Progreso		
1995–1997	Huracán Buceo		
1997–1998	Nacional de Montevideo		
1998	Rampla Juniors		
1998–1999	Slavia Praha	11	(1)
1999	→ Viktoria Žižkov (loan)	5	(0)
1999	Qingdao Etsong		
2000	Huracán Buceo		
2000	Chacarita Juniors	5	(1)
2001	Neuchâtel Xamax		
2001–2002	Huracán	25	(3)
2002–2003	Belgrano	7	(0)
2003	Huracán Buceo		
2004–2005	Sport Boys		
2005	Macará		
2005	Cartaginés	5	(0)
2005	Marquense		
2006	Uruguay Montevideo		
2007	Fénix		
2007	Miramar Misiones		
2008–	Victoria		
- * Club domestic league appearances and goals

Carim Danielo Adippe Quijano (born 15 May 1973, in Montevideo) is a Uruguayan professional footballer who plays for C.D. Victoria in Honduras. He has played for several clubs in Latin America, Europe and Asia.

== Club career ==
Adippe has been a journeyman footballer, appearing for 22 clubs over a 16-year career. He began his professional career with C.A. Bella Vista. He spent one season with SK Slavia Praha in the Czech Gambrinus liga. Adippe played for Chacarita Juniors and Club Atlético Huracán in the Argentine Primera. He also appeared in five matches for C.S. Cartaginés in the Primera Division de Costa Rica.
