= Guangzhou derby =

Football rivalries in Guangzhou, China

The Guangzhou derby or the Canton derby (simplified Chinese: 广州德比; traditional Chinese: 廣州打吡; pinyin: guǎngzhōu Débǐ) is the name given to a football derby contested by any two teams in the city of Guangzhou, China. The term specifically refers to individual matches between the teams, but can also be used to describe the general rivalry between the different clubs. Guangzhou Apollo (predecessor of Guangzhou) against Guangzhou Matsunichi (1995–2000) and Guangzhou against Guangzhou City are ranked as two of the most ferocious Guangzhou Derbies.

== Clubs ==
As of 2027 season, there are three clubs in the Chinese Super League, China League One and China League Two that play in Guangzhou:

- Guangdong GZ-Power (Super League)
- Guangdong Mingtu (League Two)
- Guangzhou Dandelion Alpha (League Two)

Guangzhou F.C., established in 1954, was a former professional football club based in Guangzhou with the longest history in the city, other former clubs in the highest league include Guangdong Hongyuan F.C. (Jia-A 1994-1997), Guangzhou Matsunichi F.C. (Jia-A 1996 & 1998-1999) and Guangzhou City (CSL 2012-2022). Guangzhou Baiyunshan F.C., Guangdong Xiongying F.C. and Guangdong Sunray Cave F.C. were formerly in the second-tier league.

== Guangzhou Apollo v Guangzhou Matsunichi ==
=== History ===
When professionalism was established within the Chinese football leagues in 1994, it opened the door for more than one team within each region. This saw the establishment of Guangzhou Matsunichi which used to be the youth academy of Guangzhou FC but were sold off to Matsunichi Digital Holdings Limited. Direct ties between these two teams also saw them share the Yuexiushan Stadium. In their first meeting in the first round of the 1995 Chinese FA Cup, Matsunichi beat Guangzhou FC 4–3 on aggregate. For a brief period during the 1998 season, both teams were in the top tier with Matsunichi finishing higher than Guangzhou FC. On 9 August 1998 in the second Guangzhou Derby that season, a Chinese first-tier league record of five red cards and nine yellow cards was issued. Apollo's Peter Blazincic, Wen Junwu and Mai Guangliang as well as Matsunichi's Leonardo Jara and Tu Shengqiao were sent off during the match. The rivalry reached its peak and subsequent conclusion during the 2000 season with both clubs in the second tier fighting relegation. On 15 July 2000, Guangzhou FC won 3–1 against Matsunichi which inevitability helped lead to Matsunichi's relegation, causing Matsunichi to disband at the end of the season.

=== Official match results ===
Guangzhou Apollo win Draw Guangzhou Matsunichi win

Season	Competition	Date	Home team	Result	Away team
1995	Chinese FA Cup	25 June 1995	Guangzhou Matsunichi	4–2	Guangzhou Apollo
1995	Chinese FA Cup	2 July 1995	Guangzhou Apollo	1–0	Guangzhou Matsunichi
1996	Chinese Jia-A League	5 May 1996	Guangzhou Matsunichi	1–4	Guangzhou Apollo
1996	Chinese Jia-A League	8 September 1996	Guangzhou Apollo	1–0	Guangzhou Matsunichi
1998	Chinese Jia-A League	9 April 1998	Guangzhou Apollo	2–2	Guangzhou Matsunichi
1998	Chinese Jia-A League	9 August 1998	Guangzhou Matsunichi	3–1	Guangzhou Apollo
2000	Chinese Jia-B League	15 April 2000	Guangzhou Apollo	0–0	Guangzhou Matsunichi
2000	Chinese Jia-B League	16 July 2000	Guangzhou Matsunichi	1–3	Guangzhou Apollo

=== Statistics ===
	Matches	Apollo wins	Draws	Matsunichi wins	Apollo goals	Matsunichi goals
Chinese Jia-A League	4	2	1	1	8	6
Chinese Jia-B League	2	1	1	0	3	1
Chinese FA Cup	2	1	0	1	3	4
Official matches	8	4	2	2	14	11

== Guangzhou v Guangzhou City ==
=== History ===
When Guangzhou R&F (predecessor of Guangzhou City) moved to the city of Guangzhou, a local derby, often referred to as the Canton derby, was born. The first Canton derby was at Yuexiushan Stadium on 16 March 2012 as Guangzhou Evergrande (predecessor of Guangzhou) lost 2–0 against Guangzhou R&F. Relations between the two club owners remain cordial off the pitch and club owners Xu Jiayin and Zhang Li were seen enjoying a meal together instead of watching the second derby in 2012 which Guangzhou R&F also won.

=== Official match results ===
Guangzhou win Draw Guangzhou city win

Season	Competition	Date	Home team	Result	Away team
2012	Chinese Super League	16 March 2012	Guangzhou R&F	2–0	Guangzhou Evergrande
2012	Chinese Super League	15 July 2012	Guangzhou Evergrande	0–1	Guangzhou R&F
2013	Chinese Super League	27 April 2013	Guangzhou R&F	0–2	Guangzhou Evergrande
2013	Chinese Super League	25 August 2013	Guangzhou Evergrande	1–0	Guangzhou R&F
2014	Chinese Super League	9 May 2014	Guangzhou Evergrande	0–1	Guangzhou R&F
2014	Chinese Super League	28 September 2014	Guangzhou R&F	3–4	Guangzhou Evergrande
2015	Chinese Super League	23 May 2015	Guangzhou Evergrande	2–2	Guangzhou R&F
2015	Chinese Super League	21 September 2015	Guangzhou R&F	1–2	Guangzhou Evergrande
2016	Chinese Super League	1 April 2016	Guangzhou Evergrande	2–0	Guangzhou R&F
2016	Chinese Super League	20 July 2016	Guangzhou R&F	2–1	Guangzhou Evergrande
2016	Chinese FA Cup semi-finals	17 August 2016	Guangzhou Evergrande	2–2	Guangzhou R&F
2016	Chinese FA Cup semi-finals	21 September 2016	Guangzhou R&F	1–3	Guangzhou Evergrande
2017	Chinese Super League	8 April 2017	Guangzhou Evergrande	2–2	Guangzhou R&F
2017	Chinese Super League	29 July 2017	Guangzhou R&F	4–2	Guangzhou Evergrande
2017	Chinese FA Cup fifth round	19 July 2017	Guangzhou R&F	4–2	Guangzhou Evergrande
2017	Chinese FA Cup fifth round	1 August 2017	Guangzhou Evergrande	7–2	Guangzhou R&F
2018	Chinese Super League	2 March 2018	Guangzhou Evergrande	4–5	Guangzhou R&F
2018	Chinese Super League	5 August 2018	Guangzhou R&F	2–4	Guangzhou Evergrande
2019	Chinese Super League	6 April 2019	Guangzhou Evergrande	2–0	Guangzhou R&F
2019	Chinese Super League	20 July 2019	Guangzhou R&F	0–5	Guangzhou Evergrande
2020	Chinese Super League	30 July 2020	Guangzhou R&F	0–5	Guangzhou Evergrande
2020	Chinese Super League	4 September 2020	Guangzhou Evergrande	2–1	Guangzhou R&F
2021	Chinese Super League	20 April 2021	Guangzhou	2–2	Guangzhou City
2021	Chinese Super League	24 July 2021	Guangzhou City	3–3	Guangzhou
2022	Chinese Super League	13 September 2022	Guangzhou City	1–0	Guangzhou
2022	Chinese Super League	10 December 2022	Guangzhou	0–0	Guangzhou City

=== Statistics ===
Statistics as of 10 Dec 2022.

	Matches	Guangzhou wins	Draws	Guangzhou City wins	Guangzhou goals	Guangzhou City goals
Chinese Super League	22	10	5	7	45	32
Chinese FA Cup	4	2	1	1	14	9
Official matches	26	12	6	8	59	41

=== Top goalscorers ===
Below is the list of players who have scored at least two goals in official meetings.

Position	Name	Team	Goals
1	(Israel) Eran Zahavi	Guangzhou R&F	13
2	(Brazil) Alan Carvalho	Guangzhou Evergrande Taobao	8
2	(Brazil) Ricardo Goulart	Guangzhou Evergrande Taobao	8
2	(Brazil) Renatinho	Guangzhou R&F	8
5	(China) Ai Kesen	Guangzhou Evergrande Taobao	4
5	(China) Gao Lin	Guangzhou Evergrande Taobao	4
5	(Brazil) Paulinho	Guangzhou Evergrande Taobao	4
8	(Morocco) Abderrazak Hamdallah	Guangzhou R&F	2
8	(Spain) Míchel	Guangzhou R&F	2
8	(Brazil) Muriqui	Guangzhou Evergrande Taobao	2
8	(China) Xiao Zhi	Guangzhou R&F	2
8	(China) Yu Hanchao	Guangzhou Evergrande Taobao	2
