= Patrick Katalay =

Congolese former footballer (born 1977)

Personal information
- Full name: Patrick Mujanayi Katalay
- Date of birth: 29 November 1977 (age 48)
- Place of birth: Zaire (Current DR Congo)
- Height: 1.76 m (5 ft 9 1/2 in)
- Position: Forward

Senior career*
Years	Team	Apps	(Gls)
1995–1996	AS Bantous		
1997–1998	DC Motema Pembe		
1999	Chongqing Longxin	9	(0)
1999	Guangzhou Baiyunshan	?	(7)
2000–2001	Guangzhou Apollo	40	(14)
2002–2004	Saint Eloi Lupopo		
2005	Delta Téléstar		
2006	Moro United		
2008–2009	Fourway Athletics	0	(0)
2009–2010	Saint Eloi Lupopo		
2010–2011	Fourway Rangers	1	(0)

International career^{‡}
1998–2002	DR Congo	3	(0)
- * Club domestic league appearances and goals as of Feb 2, 2011 ‡ National team caps and goals as of Feb 2, 2011

Patrick Katalay (born 29 November 1977) is a Congolese former footballer.

== Club career ==
Katalay began his career at AS Bantous in Zaire and joined DC Motema Pembe in 1997. He moved to China and signed a contract with Chinese Jia-A League club Chongqing Longxin in 1999. Katalay just scored one goal in the Chinese FA Cup against Guangzhou Baiyunshan and didn't score a goal in the first nine league matches. He was released by Chongqing in May. He joined Chinese Jia-B League club Guangzhou Baiyunshan several days later. Although Guangzhou Baiyunshan was relegated to China League Two in this season, Katalay did very well in the club. In January 2000, he transferred to another Jia-B League club in Guangzhou, Guangzhou Apollo. Katalay played two seasons in Guangzhou Apollo (later renamed as Guangzhou Geely), scoring 14 goals in 40 appearances.

Guangzhou Geely did not extend his contract at the end of the 2001 league season, Katalay returned to his home country and joined Saint Eloi Lupopo.
