= Li Xiaopeng (footballer) =

Chinese footballer

Li Xiaopeng 李霄鹏
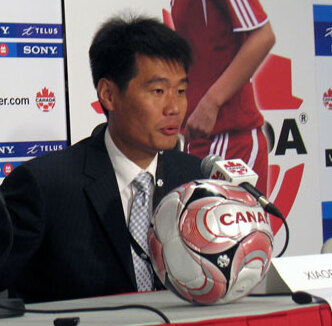

Personal information
- Full name: Li Xiaopeng
- Date of birth: 20 June 1975 (age 51)
- Place of birth: Qingdao, Shandong, China
- Height: 1.82 m (5 ft 11 1/2 in)
- Position: Midfielder

Youth career
- Shandong Youth

Senior career*
Years	Team	Apps	(Gls)
1994–2005	Shandong Luneng	217	(42)
Total		217	(42)

International career
2000–2004	China PR	39	(3)

Managerial career
- 2010–2011: China Women
- 2014: Qingdao Jonoon
- 2018–2020: Shandong Luneng
- 2021: Wuhan FC
- 2021–2022: China
- 2024: Cangzhou Mighty Lions
- 2025: Qingdao Hainiu
Medal record
Representing China
Men's football
AFC Asian Cup
Silver medal – second place	2004 China	Team
AFC U-16 Championship
Gold medal – first place	1992 Saudi Arabia	Team
- * Club domestic league appearances and goals

Li Xiaopeng (simplified Chinese: 李霄鹏; traditional Chinese: 李霄鵬; pinyin: Lǐ Xiāopéng; born 20 June 1975) is a Chinese professional football manager and former player. As a player, he spent his entire professional career at Shandong Luneng, while internationally, he was part of the Chinese national team squad in the 2000 AFC Asian Cup, the 2002 FIFA World Cup and the 2004 AFC Asian Cup.

== Club career ==
Li Xiaopeng was a rising young player who was playing for the Shandong Luneng youth team before graduating to senior team during the 1994 league season, however it was not until the following season when he played in seventeen league games and scored four goals, that he started to excel. While he remained a consistent squad regular within the team for the next few seasons, not until Slobodan Santrač became manager of the team at the beginning of the 1999 league season did Li Xiaopeng really start to become a regular member within the midfield Li Xiaopeng would be on Shandong when they won the Chinese FA Cup and Chinese Super League cup in 2004. This saw Shandong have another chance to play in the rebranded AFC Champions League where despite being a defensive midfielder, he would score a goal for Shandong Luneng with a lob from 40 meters during an ACL game in 2005 in the 7–2 second leg loss against Al-Ittihad (Jeddah), which was to be one of his last achievements before he retired in 2006.

== International career ==
While Li Xiaopeng was part of the squad that won the AFC U-17 Championship in 1992 he would have to wait until 3 September 2000 before he made his senior international debut in a friendly against Iraq in 4–1 victory. This would be impressive enough for him to be included in the squad for 2000 AFC Asian Cup where despite playing a small role within the tournament he nevertheless saw China finish fourth. After the tournament he would start to form a successful partnership with Li Tie in midfield that saw China qualify for the 2002 FIFA World Cup, which saw him score his debut goal United Arab Emirates in a 3–0 victory during qualifying. While China's debut in the World Cup was not successful, Li Xiaopeng still retained his place within the team until the 2004 AFC Asian Cup which saw the emergence of Zhao Junzhe as his replacement.

=== International goals ===
No.	Date	Venue	Opponent	Score	Result	Competition
1.	25 August 2001	Lusail Iconic Stadium, Lusail, Qatar	United Arab Emirates	1–0	3–0	2002 FIFA World Cup qualification
2.	9 June 2004	TEDA Football Stadium, Tianjin, China	Malaysia	3–0	4–0	2006 FIFA World Cup qualification
3.	9 June 2004	TEDA Football Stadium, Tianjin, China	Malaysia	4–0	4–0	2006 FIFA World Cup qualification

== Managerial career ==
After he retired Shandong offered him a position as the boss of media presentation, however due to his high-profile within China he was linked to numerous management positions. He would eventually go on to achieve the necessary coaching certificates required for a management position and he was expected to become an assistant within the Chinese Football Association. On 8 August 2010 he would accept the position of interim head coach for the Chinese women's team up to the 2010 Asian Games, which made him the youngest coach to ever manage the team. At the Games, Li would guide the team to the semi-finals where they lost 1–0 to Japan. This would be good enough for Li to be offered an extension to his contract and guide the team through the 2012 Summer Olympics qualifiers. However, they failed to qualify and Li resigned.

On 3 December 2021, Li was appointed as the new manager of the Chinese national team, succeeding his 2002 World Cup teammate Li Tie. He started his tenure disappointingly with two away losses: 2–0 to Japan and 3–1 to Vietnam. Li was dismissed in March 2022 after drawing 1 and losing 3 of his 4 games in charge.

On 8 July 2024, Li was appointed general manager of Chinese Super League club Cangzhou Mighty Lions. However, a mere days later on 16 July, he swapped positions with then-manager Zhao Junzhe and began serving as the club's head coach with Zhao as the new general manager.

On 18 January 2025, Li returned to fellow Chinese Super League club Qingdao Hainiu as their new head coach, whom he had previously managed in 2014. Former Chinese international footballer Hao Junmin also joined his coaching staff team. On 22 December 2025, the club annouanced Li's departure after the 2025 season.

== Honours ==
=== Player ===
China U-17

- AFC U-17 Championship: 1992

Shandong Luneng

- Chinese Jia-A League: 1999
- Chinese FA Cup: 1995, 1999, 2004
- Chinese Super League Cup: 2004
