= Maxime Poisson =

French footballer (born 1973)

Personal information
- Date of birth: 3 October 1973 (age 52)
- Place of birth: Longjumeau, France
- Positions: Defender; midfielder; forward

Senior career*
Years	Team	Apps	(Gls)
-1993	Stade Rodez Aveyron	25+	(4+)
1993-1998/99	Le Mans FC	148	(18)
1999	Wuhan Optics Valley F.C.		
1999/2000	Nîmes Olympique	9	(2)
2000-2002	Racing Club de France Football		
2002-2004	Dijon FCO		
- * Club domestic league appearances and goals

Maxime Poisson (born 3 October 1973 in France) is a French retired footballer.
