= Beijing derby =

Football rivalries in Beijing, China

The Beijing derby (Chinese: 北京德比; pinyin: Běijīng débǐ) is the name given to a football derby contested by any two teams in the city of Beijing, China. The term specifically refers to individual matches between the teams, but can also be used to describe the general rivalry between the different clubs.

== Clubs ==
As of 2027 season, there are one club in the Chinese Super League, China League One and China League Two that play in Beijing:

- Beijing Guoan F.C. (Super League)

Former clubs in the top two tiers of the Chinese football pyramid based in Beijing include Beijing Kuanli F.C., Beijing Institute of Technology F.C. and Beijing Sport University F.C.. Liaoning F.C. formerly played in Olympic Sports Centre (Beijing) for 20 months in 2002–2003. Beijing Renhe F.C. (previously Inter Shanghai, Shaanxi Baorong, Guizhou Renhe) formerly played at Beijing Fengtai Stadium in 2016–2020.

== Competitive match results in the first two highest leagues ==
Date	Competition	Home team	Result	Away team	Stadium
1999-03-12	Friendly	Beijing Kuanli	0–2	Beijing Guoan	Xiannongtan Stadium
2000-03-12	Friendly	Beijing Kuanli	7–8	Beijing Guoan	--
2002-03-10	Chinese Jia-A League	Beijing Guoan	1–0	Liaoning	Workers' Stadium
2002-08-15	Chinese Jia-A League	Liaoning	1–2	Beijing Guoan	Olympic Sports Centre (Beijing)
2003-03-16	Chinese Jia-A League	Beijing Guoan	2–0	Liaoning	Workers' Stadium
2007-06-30	China League One	Beijing BIT	2–0	Beijing Hongdeng	BIT Eastern Athletic Field
2007-10-27	China League One	Beijing Hongdeng	1–1	Beijing BIT	Shijingshan Stadium
2008-06-07	China League One	Beijing Hongdeng	0–1	Beijing BIT	Shijingshan Stadium
2008-10-18	China League One	Beijing BIT	0–3	Beijing Hongdeng	BIT Eastern Athletic Field
2009-06-20	China League One	Beijing Hongdeng	0–1	Beijing BIT	Shijingshan Stadium
2009-10-10	China League One	Beijing BIT	1–0	Beijing Hongdeng	BIT Eastern Athletic Field
2010-05-01	China League One	Beijing BIT	0–0	Beijing Baxy	BIT Eastern Athletic Field
2010-08-28	China League One	Beijing Baxy	0–1	Beijing BIT	Chaoyang Sports Centre
2011-05-21	China League One	Beijing Baxy	0–0	Beijing BIT	Chaoyang Sports Centre
2011-09-24	China League One	Beijing BIT	2–1	Beijing Baxy	BIT Eastern Athletic Field
2012-06-02	Chinese FA Cup	Beijing Baxy	1–2	Beijing BIT	Shijingshan Stadium
2012-06-17	China League One	Beijing Baxy	1–3	Beijing BIT	Shijingshan Stadium
2012-10-06	China League One	Beijing BIT	0–4	Beijing Baxy	BIT Eastern Athletic Field
2013-03-23	China League One	Beijing BIT	1–2	Beijing Baxy	BIT Eastern Athletic Field
2013-07-22	China League One	Beijing Baxy	2–1	Beijing BIT	Chaoyang Sports Centre
2014-04-05	China League One	Beijing BIT	1–1	Beijing Baxy	BIT Eastern Athletic Field
2014-08-17	China League One	Beijing Baxy	2–2	Beijing BIT	Chaoyang Sports Centre
2015-05-30	China League One	Beijing BIT	2–3	Beijing BG	BIT Eastern Athletic Field
2015-07-08	Chinese FA Cup	Beijing BG	2–0	Beijing Guoan	Olympic Sports Centre (Beijing)
2015-09-19	China League One	Beijing BG	4–1	Beijing BIT	Olympic Sports Centre (Beijing)
2016-03-20	China League One	Beijing BG	1–0	Beijing Renhe	Olympic Sports Centre (Beijing)
2016-07-10	China League One	Beijing Renhe	2–1	Beijing BG	Beijing Fengtai Stadium
2017-04-22	China League One	Beijing BG	0–4	Beijing Renhe	Olympic Sports Centre (Beijing)
2017-05-02	Chinese FA Cup	Beijing Renhe	0–5	Beijing Sinobo Guoan	Beijing Fengtai Stadium
2017-08-12	China League One	Beijing Renhe	2–0	Beijing BG	Beijing Fengtai Stadium
2018-03-31	Chinese Super League	Beijing Sinobo Guoan	4–0	Beijing Renhe	Workers' Stadium
2018-08-18	Chinese Super League	Beijing Renhe	3–0	Beijing Sinobo Guoan	Beijing Fengtai Stadium
2019-03-30	Chinese Super League	Beijing Renhe	0–1	Beijing Sinobo Guoan	Beijing Fengtai Stadium
2019-07-17	Chinese Super League	Beijing Sinobo Guoan	2–1	Beijing Renhe	Workers' Stadium
2020-09-19	China League One	Beijing BSU	0–1	Beijing Renhe	Wenjiang Base-III
2020-10-08	China League One	Beijing Renhe	3–2	Beijing BSU	Shuangliu Sports Centre
2020-10-25	China League One	Beijing BSU	3–0	Beijing Renhe	Wuhua County Stadium
2021-07-17	China League One	Beijing BIT	2–3	Beijing BSU	Hengbei Football Town Field 9
2021-08-05	China League One	Beijing BSU	0–1	Beijing BIT	Wuhua County Olympic Sports Centre
2022-09-08	China League One	Beijing BSU	4–0	Beijing BIT	Tangshan Nanhu City Football Training Base Field No.3
2022-09-24	China League One	Beijing BIT	1-1	Beijing BSU	Tangshan Nanhu City Football Training Base Field No.3
