= Shanghai derby =

Football rivalries in Shanghai, China

The Shanghai derby (Chinese: 上海德比; pinyin: Shànghǎi Débǐ) is a name given to a football derby contested by any two teams in the city of Shanghai, China. The term specifically refers to individual matches between the teams, but can also be used to describe the general rivalry between the different clubs. Shanghai Shenhua against Shanghai COSCO Huili (2002–2005) and Shanghai Shenhua against Shanghai Port are ranked as two of the most ferocious Shanghai Derbies.

== Clubs ==
As of 2027 season, there are three clubs in the Chinese Super League, China League One and China League Two that play in Shanghai:

- Shanghai Shenhua F.C. (Super League)
- Shanghai Port F.C. (Super League)
- Shanghai Port B (League Two)

Former clubs in the highest league include Shanghai COSCO Huili (Jia-A 2002–2003, CSL 2004–2005), Shanghai United (CSL 2005–2006) and Shanghai Shenxin (CSL 2010–2015). Shanghai Yuyuan, Shanghai Zobon and Shanghai Jiading Huilong were formerly in the second-tier league.

== Competitive match results in the first two highest leagues ==
Date	Competition	Home team	Result	Away team	Stadium
1996.4.13	Chinese Jia-B League	Shanghai Pudong	0–0	Shanghai Yuyuan	Chuansha Stadium
1996.8.10	Chinese Jia-B League	Shanghai Yuyuan	~~1–1~~; 3–0	Shanghai Pudong	Jiangwan Stadium
1997.3.15	Chinese Jia-B League	Shanghai Pudong	2–3	Shanghai Yuyuan	Chuansha Stadium
1997.5.10	Chinese FA Cup	Shanghai Yuyuan	4–1	Shanghai Pudong	Zhabei Stadium
1997.5.18	Chinese FA Cup	Shanghai Pudong	1–0	Shanghai Yuyuan	Chuansha Stadium
1997.7.26	Chinese Jia-B League	Shanghai Yuyuan	0–2	Shanghai Pudong	Zhabei Stadium
1998.5.2	Chinese Jia-B League	Shanghai Yuyuan	3–0	Shanghai Pudong	Fengxian Stadium
1998.9.12	Chinese Jia-B League	Shanghai Pudong	2–1	Shanghai Yuyuan	Chuansha Stadium
2002.3.9	Chinese Jia-A League	Shanghai Shenhua	0–2	Shanghai COSCO Huili	Hongkou Football Stadium
2002.8.15	Chinese Jia-A League	Shanghai COSCO Huili	3–0	Shanghai Shenhua	Shanghai Stadium
2003.7.16	Chinese Jia-A League	Shanghai COSCO Huili	2–1	Shanghai Shenhua	Shanghai Stadium
2003.11.9	Chinese Jia-A League	Shanghai Shenhua	4–1	Shanghai COSCO Sanlin	Hongkou Football Stadium
2004.2.22	A3 Champions Cup	Shanghai Shenhua	1–1	Shanghai COSCO Sanlin	Hongkou Football Stadium
2004.5.30	Chinese Super League	Shanghai COSCO Sanlin	1–1	Shanghai Shenhua	Shanghai Stadium
2004.10.17	Chinese Super League	Shanghai Shenhua	3–2	Shanghai COSCO Sanlin	Hongkou Football Stadium
2005.4.24	Chinese Super League	Shanghai Shenhua	1–0	Shanghai Yungtay	Hongkou Football Stadium
2005.4.29	Chinese Super League	Shanghai United	1–0	Shanghai Shenhua	Yuanshen Sports Centre Stadium
2005.5.19	Chinese Super League Cup	Shanghai United	1–4	Shanghai Shenhua	Fengxian Stadium
2005.5.29	Chinese Super League Cup	Shanghai Shenhua	3–1	Shanghai United	Jiading Stadium
2005.7.7	Chinese Super League	Shanghai United	1–2	Shanghai Yungtay	Yuanshen Sports Centre Stadium
2005.8.27	Chinese Super League	Shanghai Yungtay	1–2	Shanghai Shenhua	Shanghai Stadium
2005.9.1	Chinese Super League	Shanghai Shenhua	3–0	Shanghai United	Hongkou Football Stadium
2005.10.30	Chinese Super League	Shanghai Yungtay	3–0	Shanghai United	Shanghai Stadium
2006.3.30	Chinese Super League	Shanghai Shenhua	0–0	Shanghai United	Hongkou Football Stadium
2006.7.22	Chinese Super League	Shanghai United	1–1	Shanghai Shenhua	Yuanshen Sports Centre Stadium
2009.4.11	China League One	Shanghai East Asia	2–0	Shanghai Zobon	Shanghai Stadium
2009.8.21	China League One	Shanghai Zobon	2–1	Shanghai East Asia	Yuanshen Sports Centre Stadium
2010.5.1	China League One	Shanghai Zobon	0–0	Shanghai East Asia	Yuanshen Sports Centre Stadium
2010.8.28	China League One	Shanghai East Asia	4–1	Shanghai Zobon	Shanghai Stadium
2012.5.12	Chinese Super League	Shanghai Shenhua	0–0	Shanghai Shenxin	Hongkou Football Stadium
2012.9.22	Chinese Super League	Shanghai Shenxin	1–1	Shanghai Shenhua	Jinshan Football Stadium
2013.3.17	Chinese Super League	Shanghai Shenxin	0–1	Shanghai Shenhua	Yuanshen Sports Centre Stadium
2013.4.28	Chinese Super League	Shanghai Shenhua	2–1	Shanghai SIPG	Hongkou Football Stadium
2013.6.2	Chinese Super League	Shanghai Shenxin	1–6	Shanghai SIPG	Yuanshen Sports Centre Stadium
2013.7.13	Chinese Super League	Shanghai Shenhua	2–0	Shanghai Shenxin	Hongkou Football Stadium
2013.8.24	Chinese Super League	Shanghai SIPG	0–1	Shanghai Shenhua	Shanghai Stadium
2013.10.5	Chinese Super League	Shanghai SIPG	0–1	Shanghai Shenxin	Shanghai Stadium
2014.3.9	Chinese Super League	Shanghai Shenxin	0–2	Shanghai Greenland Shenhua	Jinshan Football Stadium
2014.3.16	Chinese Super League	Shanghai SIPG	5–1	Shanghai Shenxin	Shanghai Stadium
2014.4.26	Chinese Super League	Shanghai SIPG	1–1	Shanghai Greenland Shenhua	Shanghai Stadium
2014.7.26	Chinese Super League	Shanghai Greenland Shenhua	2–0	Shanghai Shenxin	Hongkou Football Stadium
2014.7.30	Chinese Super League	Shanghai Shenxin	1–3	Shanghai SIPG	Jinshan Football Stadium
2014.8.6	Chinese FA Cup	Shanghai Greenland Shenhua	4–2	Shanghai Shenxin	Hongkou Football Stadium
2014.8.31	Chinese Super League	Shanghai Greenland Shenhua	1–1	Shanghai SIPG	Hongkou Football Stadium
2015.3.8	Chinese Super League	Shanghai Greenland Shenhua	6–2	Shanghai Shenxin	Hongkou Football Stadium
2015.3.15	Chinese Super League	Shanghai Shenxin	0–2	Shanghai SIPG	Yuanshen Sports Centre Stadium
2015.5.9	Chinese Super League	Shanghai SIPG	5–0	Shanghai Greenland Shenhua	Shanghai Stadium
2015.6.28	Chinese Super League	Shanghai Shenxin	1–1	Shanghai Greenland Shenhua	Yuanshen Sports Centre Stadium
2015.7.5	Chinese Super League	Shanghai SIPG	2–0	Shanghai Shenxin	Shanghai Stadium
2015.8.19	Chinese FA Cup	Shanghai Greenland Shenhua	3–3 (5–4 p)	Shanghai SIPG	Hongkou Football Stadium
2015.8.23	Chinese Super League	Shanghai Greenland Shenhua	1–2	Shanghai SIPG	Hongkou Football Stadium
2016.3.11	Chinese Super League	Shanghai SIPG	1–1	Shanghai Greenland Shenhua	Shanghai Stadium
2016.7.17	Chinese Super League	Shanghai Greenland Shenhua	2–1	Shanghai SIPG	Hongkou Football Stadium
2017.5.20	Chinese Super League	Shanghai Greenland Shenhua	1–3	Shanghai SIPG	Hongkou Football Stadium
2017.8.15	Chinese FA Cup	Shanghai Greenland Shenhua	1–0	Shanghai Shenxin	Hongkou Football Stadium
2017.9.16	Chinese Super League	Shanghai SIPG	6–1	Shanghai Greenland Shenhua	Shanghai Stadium
2017.9.29	Chinese FA Cup	Shanghai Shenxin	0–1	Shanghai Greenland Shenhua	Jinshan Football Stadium
2017.11.19	Chinese FA Cup	Shanghai Greenland Shenhua	1–0	Shanghai SIPG	Hongkou Football Stadium
2017.11.26	Chinese FA Cup	Shanghai SIPG	3–2	Shanghai Greenland Shenhua	Shanghai Stadium
2018.3.10	Chinese Super League	Shanghai Greenland Shenhua	0–2	Shanghai SIPG	Hongkou Football Stadium
2018.8.11	Chinese Super League	Shanghai SIPG	2–0	Shanghai Greenland Shenhua	Shanghai Stadium
2019.3.1	Chinese Super League	Shanghai Greenland Shenhua	0–4	Shanghai SIPG	Hongkou Football Stadium
2019.7.6	Chinese Super League	Shanghai SIPG	3–1	Shanghai Greenland Shenhua	Shanghai Stadium
2020.10.18	Chinese Super League	Shanghai Greenland Shenhua	0–0	Shanghai SIPG	Suzhou Olympic Sports Centre
2020.10.23	Chinese Super League	Shanghai SIPG	1–1 (5–4 p)	Shanghai Greenland Shenhua	Suzhou Olympic Sports Centre
2021.5.5	Chinese Super League	Shanghai Shenhua	1–1	Shanghai Port	Suzhou Sports Center
2021.7.31	Chinese Super League	Shanghai Port	1–0	Shanghai Shenhua	Suzhou Olympic Sports Centre
2021.11.3	Chinese FA Cup	Shanghai Shenhua	1–5	Shanghai Port	Dalian Sports Centre Stadium
2021.11.7	Chinese FA Cup	Shanghai Port	1–1	Shanghai Shenhua	Dalian Sports Centre Stadium
2022.6.8	Chinese Super League	Shanghai Shenhua	2–0	Shanghai Port	Dalian Puwan Stadium
2022.6.29	Chinese Super League	Shanghai Port	1–1	Shanghai Shenhua	Dalian Jinzhou Stadium
2023.4.30	Chinese Super League	Shanghai Port	1–1	Shanghai Shenhua	Pudong Football Stadium
2023.7.29	Chinese Super League	Shanghai Shenhua	0–5	Shanghai Port	Shanghai Stadium
2024.2.25	Chinese FA Super Cup	Shanghai Port	0–1	Shanghai Shenhua	Hongkou Football Stadium
2024.4.27	Chinese Super League	Shanghai Port	1–1	Shanghai Shenhua	Pudong Football Stadium
2024.8.17	Chinese Super League	Shanghai Shenhua	3–1	Shanghai Port	Shanghai Stadium
2024.9.25	Chinese FA Cup	Shanghai Port	3–2	Shanghai Shenhua	Pudong Football Stadium
2025.2.7	Chinese FA Super Cup	Shanghai Port	2–3	Shanghai Shenhua	Kunshan Football Stadium
2025.4.6	Chinese Super League	Shanghai Port	1–1	Shanghai Shenhua	Pudong Football Stadium
2025.6.22	Chinese FA Cup	Shanghai Port	2–3	Shanghai Shenhua	Pudong Football Stadium
2025.8.9	Chinese Super League	Shanghai Shenhua	1–2	Shanghai Port	Shanghai Stadium
2026.4.11	Chinese Super League	Shanghai Shenhua	1–0	Shanghai Port	Shanghai Stadium
2026.7.25	Chinese Super League	Shanghai Port	2–0	Shanghai Shenhua	Pudong Football Stadium
