= Datianwan Stadium =

Multi-purpose stadium in Chongqing, China

Coordinates: 29°33′20″N 106°32′43″E

Datianwan Stadium (simplified Chinese: 大田湾体育场; traditional Chinese: 大田灣體育場; pinyin: Dàtiánwān tǐyùchǎng) is a multi-purpose stadium in Chongqing. Built in 1954 under the direction of He Long, Datianwan is the oldest multi-purpose stadium of its size in southwestern China. It is currently used mostly for football matches. The stadium holds 32,000 people. It served as the home ground for Chongqing Lifan F.C. before 2004.

== History ==
- 1954: Construction begins under the direction of He Long.
- 1956: Stadium opens to the public.
- 2005: Deemed a dangerous building due to potential safety hazards.
- 2019: Closed for renovation.
- 2023: Reopens after two years of restoration.

=== Architectural Features ===
- Elliptical shape reflecting international standards.
- Watchtowers, red walls, arched windows, and white jade railings with strong Chinese style.
- Grandstand retaining its original style.
- 2,000-square-meter red wall reinforced while maintaining historical appearance.
- More than 20,000 seats reinstalled in gray, similar to the original color.

=== Recent Restoration ===
- Focused on "repairing the old as the old" while restoring sports function.
- Underground garage built with nearly 1,500 parking spaces.
- Pedestrian bridge connecting the stadium to the Chongqing Working People's Cultural Palace.
- Central axis cultural corridor on Helong Square with granite floor tiles, Chongqing characteristic trees, and black and white magnolia lampposts.
