= Chongqing Liangjiang Athletic F.C. =

Chinese professional football club

Chongqing Liangjiang Athletic (Chóngqìng Liǎngjiāng Jìngjì; 重庆两江竞技)
- Full name: Chongqing Liangjiang Athletic Football Club 重庆两江竞技足球俱乐部
- Founded: 1995; 31 years ago
- Dissolved: 24 May 2022; 4 years ago
- Ground: Chongqing Olympic Sports Center
- Capacity: 58,680
- Owner(s): Wuhan Dangdai Group (90%); Lifan Group (10%)
- Chairman: Jiang Lizhang
- 2021: Super League, 13th of 16
- Website: www.dangdailifanfc.cn
Home colours	Away colours

Chongqing Liangjiang Athletic Football Club (Chinese: 重庆两江竞技足球俱乐部; pinyin: Chóngqìng Liǎngjiāng Jìngjì Zúqiú Jùlèbù) was a Chinese professional football club based in Chongqing.

The club was founded in 1995 as Wuhan Qianwei before making their debut in the newly developed fully professional Chinese football league system where they started in the third tier within the 1995 league season. They would quickly rise up to the top tier and experience their greatest achievement of winning the 2000 Chinese FA Cup and coming fourth within the league. In 2002, they came fourth place in the last season of the Asian Cup Winners' Cup. After these achievements they struggled to replicate the same success and experienced their first relegation from the top tier in the 2006 league season. After gaining promotion in 2008 back into the top tier they were unable to remain in the top flight and were relegated once more in the 2010 season. In 2014, they finished the season at the top of Chinese League One (tier 2) division and won promotion to the Chinese Super League again. Between 2017 and 2021 the club was known as Chongqing Dangdai Lifan.

According to Forbes, in 2016, Chongqing was the 9th most valuable football team in China, with a team value of $76 million, and an estimated revenue of $17 million in 2015.

The club was dissolved on 24 May 2022.

== History ==
=== Establishment in Wuhan ===
Wuhan Qianwei F.C. was founded in Wuhan, Hubei Province in early 1995 on the basis of the second team of Hubei WISCO, which had taken the vacant place in Jia B League created by the merger of Hubei Football Team (est. 1954) and Wuhan Football Team to form its parent team in the previous year, and was relegated to China League Two after that season.

In the 1995 season, Hubei Qianwei took part in the bottom level (tier-3) China League Two and finished fourth to gain promotion to the second division. In the second tier, they quickly received significant funding from the Ministry of Public Security along with the Huandao Group, a notable company in tourism industry based in Hainan, which in turn also saw the club change its name to Qianwei Huandao to represent their new stockholder. Qianwei Huandao tried to relocate their home ground in Haikou, the capital city of Hainan province, but the team finally chose to stay in Wuhan since there was no suitable stadium in Hainan to serve as the home ground. With significant investment coming into the team, they bought several former Chinese international players such as Feng Zhigang and Xu Tao to strengthen the squad. This soon paid off when the club won the second-tier league and promoted to the top tier at the end of the 1996 league season.

=== Move to Chongqing ===
In the top tier the owners decided that the club needed to affiliate itself with a major region that had a great football fan population, so they decided to move to the nearby city of Chongqing and chose the Datianwan Stadium as their new home ground. This was followed by more Chinese internationals such as Jiang Feng and Han Jinming joining the team and ensuring the club stayed up in the tier one at the end of the season. Ensuring that the club remain the only team within the Chongqing region, the club went on to merge and essentially take over a club in the lower-level league, Chongqing Hongyan, after the 1999 season. This was then followed by a complete shift of the club ownership. Lifan Group, a local flagship company in automobile industry, bought the club for 55,800,000 yuan on 19 August 2000 and renamed the club Chongqing Lifan. While all of this was happening the club's manager Lee Jang-Soo was ensuring that the club would gradually improve each successive season and provide the club with their greatest achievement of winning the 2000 Chinese FA Cup for the first time in the club's history. Chongqing Lifan would then be eligible to enter their first continental competition when they competed in the 2001–02 Asian Cup Winners' Cup and with Edson Tavares as their new manager he would lead the club to a semi-finals position where the club lost 0:2 to Anyang Cheetahs before ending the competition in fourth after losing to Al Sadd by penalty kicks after a 0:0 regular-time draw in a third-place final game.

=== Takeover of Yunnan Hongta ===
In the 2003 league season Chongqing Lifan had brought in Miloš Hrstić as their new coach, however his appointment was a disaster and the club was relegated at the end of the season. With the club desperate to remain within the top tier they would buy Yunnan Hongta's registration and merge the clubs' senior teams together allowing Chongqing Lifan to remain in the top division. Surprisingly the club would actually profit from the merger when several of the surplus players from both teams would then go on to gain investment from the Hunan Corun Group and buy Chongqing Lifan's second division registration for 20,000,000 yuan to then form Hunan Shoking. Back on the field the club would bring in Yu Dongfeng as their new manager in the 2004 league season, however because it was an expansion season the club would stagnate at the bottom of the league, safe in the knowledge that there was no relegation that season. With no relegation again in the 2005 league season there was no improvement within the team despite the change in management with Ma Lin coming in. With relegation reinstated in the 2006 league season the club brought in another change of management with Xu Hong, however for the third straight season in a row the club finished bottom of the league and were relegated at the end of the season. The club would decide to bring in a new manager and hired from within with former player Wei Xin chosen. The move would pay-off when on his second season the club won promotion back into the top tier when Chongqing came second at the end of the 2008 league season.

=== Dangdai era ===
On 26 June 2016, Jiang Lizhang purchased 98.13% of Granada CF, setting up an affiliation, which has seen Feng Jing and Wang Zixiang go to the Spanish club, with Chongqing Lifan. On 5 January 2017, Jiang, alongside the Dangdai International Group, purchased 90% of Chongqing Lifan, renaming the club Chongqing Dangdai Lifan.

== Name history ==
- 1995: Wuhan Qianwei (武汉前卫)
- 1996–1998: Qianwei Huandao (前卫寰岛)
- 1999–2000: Chongqing Longxin (重庆隆鑫)
- 2000–2003: Chongqing Lifan (重庆力帆)
- 2004: Chongqing Qiche (重庆奇伡)
- 2005–2016: Chongqing Lifan (重庆力帆)
- 2017–2020: Chongqing Dangdai Lifan (重庆当代力帆)
- 2021–2022: Chongqing Liangjiang Athletic (重庆两江竞技)

== Rivalries ==
Throughout Chongqing Lifan's history they have built rivalries with Sichuan Quanxing, Chengdu Blades and Chongqing F.C., whom they contested in regional derbies. The oldest of these rivalries was against Sichuan Quanxing, which was formed when the club moved to the neighbouring province of Chongqing and effectively created a local derby. With both clubs in the top tier representing two neighbouring provinces, a fierce local rivalry would form that reached its peak on 12 November 2003 in a vital league game for both teams to avoid relegation. Sichuan won 2–0 in a highly contentious game that saw Qiu Weiguo (邱卫国) from Chongqing and Marko Jovanović of Sichuan receive suspensions for their on-field behavior. This rivalry would come to end when Sichuan declared themselves defunct at the end of the 2005 league season; however, another Sichuan province club in Chengdu Blades soon took over the baton as local rivals. This was ignited on 14 April 2007 in a home league game for Chongqing Lifan that saw Chengdu win 1–0 as both teams looked to win promotion into the top tier that season. For several seasons these two clubs would fight in an intermittent rivalry until Chengdu were dissolved in 2015 after facing financial difficulties.

The Chongqing derby was contested by Chongqing Lifan and Chongqing F.C. as a local inner city rivalry. Hostilities were immediately started with the formation of Chongqing F.C. in 2010 when their owners proclaimed that the formation of their club would produce a "healthy Chongqing" football environment for the sport within the province, a term that was seen as an insult directed at Chongqing Lifan who were relegated from the top flight that season. After only one season both clubs would meet each other within the second division and had their first encounter in a league game with Chongqing F.C. playing at home as Chongqing Lifan won 4–1. The return fixture would see violence break out between the two set of fans as the rivalry intensified between the clubs. On 21 December 2013 the rivalry was cancelled when Chongqing F.C. was dissolved due to financial difficulties.

Some fans of Chongqing Lifan also regard Shijiazhuang Yongchang F.C. (a club in Hebei province) as a major rival due to the hostility between fanbases of these two clubs triggered by the transfer of Wang Dong from Shandong Tengding to Chongqing Lifan in 2014. Wang was hated by Yongchang fans because of his previously unfriendly words against another Hebei team Hebei Zhongji (now Hebei China Fortune).

== Managerial history ==
As of End of 2021 Chinese league season.

- (Germany) Klaus Schlappner (1996–97)
- (South Korea) Lee Jang-Soo (1998–01)
- (Brazil) Edson Tavares (2002–03)
- (Croatia) Milos Hrstic (2003)
- (China) Yu Dongfeng (2004)
- (Romania) Viorel Hizo (2004–05)
- (China) Ma Lin (2005)
- (China) Xu Hong (2006)
- (China) Wei Xin (2007–09)
- (Netherlands) Arie Haan (2009)
- (China) Wei Xin (interim) (2009–10)
- (China) Li Shubin (2010)
- (China) Wei Xin (interim) (2010)
- (China) Liu Jingbiao (2011)
- (Scotland) (Australia) Lawrie McKinna (2012)
- (China) Tang Yaodong (2012)
- (China) Wang Baoshan (2013–2015)
- (South Korea) Chang Woe-Ryong (2016–2017)
- (Portugal) Paulo Bento (2018)
- (China) Hao Haitao (interim) (2018)
- (Netherlands) Jordi Cruyff (2018–2019)
- (South Korea) Chang Woe-Ryong (2020–2022)

== Honours ==
=== League ===
- Jia B Champions/China League One
  - Winners (2): 1996, 2014

=== Cup ===
- Chinese FA Cup
  - Winners (1): 2000
- Chinese FA Super Cup
  - Runner-up (1): 2000

=== Youth ===
- U19 Adidas Youth League Champions
  - Winners (1): 2007

== Results ==
All-time league rankings

Updated 1 April 2021.

Year	Div	Pld	W	D	L	GF	GA	GD	Pts	Pos.	FA Cup	Super Cup	League Cup	AFC	Other		Att./G	Stadium
1995	3	8	3	5	0				7^{1}	4	DNQ	DNQ	–				2,217	Xinhua Road Sports Center
1996	2	22	13	7	2	40	14	26	46	W	R2	DNQ	–				3,188	Xinhua Road Sports Center
1997	1	22	8	5	9	28	28	0	29	5	SF	DNQ	–				27,727	Datianwan Stadium
1998	1	26	8	8	10	29	29	0	32	7	R3	DNQ	–				24,000	Datianwan Stadium
1999	1	26	10	10	6	40	27	13	40	4	R3	DNQ	–				17,231	Datianwan Stadium
2000	1	26	10	11	5	46	33	13	41	4	W	RU	–				16,615	Datianwan Stadium
2001	1	26	7	10	9	24	27	−3	31	11	R2	DNQ	–		CWC	4	21,615	Datianwan Stadium
2002	1	28	10	11	7	28	25	3	41	6	R1	DNQ	–				14,893	Datianwan Stadium
2003	1	28	6	8	14	21	34	−13	26	13^{2}	SF	DNQ	–				19,286	Datianwan Stadium
2004	1	22	4	9	9	14	31	−17	21	12^{3}	R1	NH	R1				15,727	Datianwan Stadium; Moved to Chongqing Olympic Sports Center
2005	1	26	2	7	17	16	41	−25	13	14^{3}	R1	NH	R2				5,731	Yanghe Stadium
2006	1	28	3	7	18	20	51	−31	16	15	R1	NH	NH				6,536	Yanghe Stadium
2007	2	24	13	5	6	34	22	12	44	4	NH	NH	NH				2,088	Yanghe Stadium
2008	2	24	12	7	5	34	19	15	43	RU	NH	NH	NH				1,897	Yanghe Stadium
2009	1	30	7	8	15	27	51	−24	29	16^{4}	NH	NH	NH				11,440	Chongqing Olympic Sports Center
2010	1	30	7	9	14	36	48	−12	30	15	NH	NH	NH				11,433	Chongqing Olympic Sports Center
2011	2	26	8	9	9	30	35	−5	33	8	R2	NH	NH				1,721	Yongchuan Sports Center
2012	2	30	12	9	9	50	45	5	45	5	R3	DNQ	NH				4,043	Fuling Stadium
2013	2	30	17	5	8	45	27	18	56	4	R3	DNQ	NH				2,725	Fuling Stadium
2014	2	30	17	10	3	60	24	36	61	W	R3	DNQ	NH				13,254	Chongqing Olympic Sports Center
2015	1	30	9	8	13	37	52	−15	35	8	R4	DNQ	NH				37,595	Chongqing Olympic Sports Center
2016	1	30	9	10	11	43	50	−7	37	8	R3	DNQ	NH				36,178	Chongqing Olympic Sports Center
2017	1	30	9	9	12	37	40	−3	36	10	R3	DNQ	NH				34,439	Chongqing Olympic Sports Center
2018	1	30	8	8	14	40	46	−6	32	13	R16	DNQ	NH				32,434	Chongqing Olympic Sports Center
2019	1	30	9	9	12	36	47	-11	36	10	R16	DNQ	NH				30,908	Chongqing Olympic Sports Center
2020	1	20	9	4	7	31	29	2		6	R2	DNQ	NH				1,500 ^{5}	Chongqing Olympic Sports Center
2021	1	22	5	5	12	21	36	-15	20	13	R16	DNQ	NH					Chongqing Olympic Sports Center

- ^1 In final group stage.
- ^2 Merged with Yunnan Hongta so that the club could stay at top level.
- ^3 No relegation.
- ^4 Two Super League clubs were involved in match-fixing scandal and relegated to League One, so Chongqing could stay at top level.
- ^5 Due to the COVID-19 pandemic, matches of the 2020 season were changed to a 2-stage format. Chongqing finished at the 3rd position in the 8-team Suzhou group (W7, D3, L4) and entered the Suzhou championship playoff in the second stage, where it eventually finished at the 6th position. No game was played at the home ground. No attendance was allowed in the group stage and 5 out of 6 playoff games had limited permitted attendance.

Key

	China top division
	China second division
	China third division
W	Winners/Champions
RU	Runners-up
3	Third place
	Relegated

- Pld = Played
- W = Games won
- D = Games drawn
- L = Games lost
- F = Goals for
- A = Goals against
- Pts = Points
- Pos = Final position
- DNQ = Did not qualify
- DNE = Did not enter
- NH = Not Held
- – = Does Not Exist
- R1 = Round 1
- R2 = Round 2
- R3 = Round 3
- R4 = Round 4
- F = Final
- SF = Semi-finals
- QF = Quarter-finals
- R16 = Round of 16
- Group = Group stage
- GS2 = Second Group stage
- QR1 = First Qualifying Round
- QR2 = Second Qualifying Round
- QR3 = Third Qualifying Round

=== Continental results ===
Season	Competition	Round	Opposition	Home	Away	Rank /Agg.
2001–02	Asian Cup Winners' Cup	Second round	(Vietnam) HCMC Police	8–1	1–0	9–1
2001–02	Asian Cup Winners' Cup	Quarter-finals	(Singapore) Home United	2–0	2–0	4–0
2001–02	Asian Cup Winners' Cup	Semi-finals	(South Korea) Jeonbuk Hyundai Motors	0–2		
2001–02	Asian Cup Winners' Cup	Third place	(Qatar) Al-Sadd	0–0 (6–7 p)		
