= Guangzhou Baiyunshan F.C. =

Chinese football club

Guangzhou Baiyunshan 广州白云山
- Full name: Guangzhou Baiyunshan F.C. 广州白云山足球俱乐部
- Founded: 1998; 27 years ago
- Dissolved: 2000; 25 years ago
- Ground: Xingzhong Stadium, Zhongshan

Guangzhou Baiyunshan (Chinese: 广州白云山) was a Chinese football club, located in Guangzhou, Guangdong, China. The club was founded in 1998 and promoted to the second tier of Chinese football league at the end of the 1998 season. The club was disbanded at the end of the 2000 season after failing to promote to the second tier.

They gained five points in the 1999 season (1 win, 2 draws and 19 defeats) and were relegated to the third tier. The only match they won was in the last round of the season, when they defeated Jiangsu Gige 1–0.

== Results ==
Season	1998	1999	2000
Division	3	2	3
Position	1	12	3

== Honours ==
- Chinese Yi League: 1998

== International players ==
- (Honduras) Eduardo Arriola
- (Democratic Republic of the Congo) Patrick Katalay
