= Park Choong-kyun =

South Korean footballer and manager

Park Choong-Kyun 박충균
Personal information
- Full name: Park Choong-Kyun
- Date of birth: June 20, 1973 (age 53)
- Place of birth: South Korea
- Height: 1.85 m (6 ft 1 in)
- Position: Defender

Youth career
- 1992–1995: Konkuk University

Senior career*
Years	Team	Apps	(Gls)
1996–2001	Suwon Samsung Bluewings	14	(0)
1999–2000	→ Sangmu		
2001–2003	Seongnam Ilhwa Chunma	41	(1)
2004–2005	Busan I'Park	15	(0)
2006	Daejeon Citizen	18	(0)
2007	Busan I'Park	7	(0)

International career^{‡}
1994–1996	South Korea U-23	30	(3)
1995–2003	South Korea	6	(0)

Managerial career
- 2009–2010: Seongnam Ilhwa Chunma U-15 (Coach)
- 2010: Guam
- 2011: Ulsan Hyundai (Reserve team coach)
- 2013–2018: Jeonbuk Motors (assistant coach)
- 2018: Tianjin Quanjian
- 2018: Tianjin Quanjian (assistant coach)
- 2019: Tianjin Tianhai
- 2021–2022: Hanoi FC
- 2021–2022: Vietnam (assistant coach)
- 2022–2023: Seoul E-Land FC
- * Club domestic league appearances and goals as of November 30, 2023 ‡ National team caps and goals as of January 8, 2008

- Park Choong-kyun
- Hangul: 박충균
- Hanja: 朴忠均
- RR: Bak Chunggyun
- MR: Pak Ch'unggyun

Park Choong-Kyun (Korean: 박충균; born on June 20, 1973) is a South Korea football former player.

== International career ==
He was part of the South Korea football team in 1996 Summer Olympics, who finished third in Group C.

== Managerial career ==
He was appointed as the manager of Seoul E-Land FC on November 10, 2022. However, on November 30, 2023, he left the club through a mutual consent.
