= 2006 Beijing Guoan F.C. season =

Beijing Guoan
2006 season
- Manager: Shen Xiangfu
- Stadium: Beijing Fengtai Stadium
- Super League: 3rd
- FA Cup: Second Round
- Average home league attendance: 13,571

The 2006 Beijing Guoan F.C. season was their 3rd consecutive season in the Chinese Super League, established in the 2004, and 16th consecutive season in the top flight of Chinese football. They competed in the Chinese Super League and FA Cup.

== First team ==
As of May 11, 2006

Note: Flags indicate national team as defined under FIFA eligibility rules; some limited exceptions apply. Players may hold more than one non-FIFA nationality.

| No. | Pos. | Nation | Player |
|---|---|---|---|
| 1 | GK | (China) CHN | Yang Jun |
| 2 | DF | (China) CHN | Lang Zheng |
| 3 | DF | (China) CHN | Zhang Shuai |
| 4 | DF | (Argentina) ARG | Javier Musa |
| 5 | DF | (China) CHN | Qiu Zhonghui |
| 6 | MF | (China) CHN | Sui Dongliang |
| 7 | MF | (China) CHN | Wang Changqing |
| 8 | MF | (China) CHN | Yang Pu |
| 9 | FW | (China) CHN | Xu Ning |
| 10 | FW | (Hungary) HUN | Krisztián Kenesei |
| 11 | FW | (China) CHN | Yan Xiangchuang |
| 12 | DF | (China) CHN | Cui Wei |
| 13 | DF | (China) CHN | Xu Yunlong (Captain) |
| 14 | MF | (China) CHN | Wang Dong |
| 15 | MF | (China) CHN | Tao Wei |

| No. | Pos. | Nation | Player |
|---|---|---|---|
| 16 | MF | (China) CHN | Huang Bowen |
| 17 | FW | (China) CHN | Gao Dawei |
| 18 | MF | (China) CHN | Lu Jiang |
| 19 | MF | (China) CHN | Yang Hao |
| 20 | MF | (China) CHN | Li Yao |
| 21 | MF | (China) CHN | Gao Leilei |
| 22 | GK | (China) CHN | Yang Zhi |
| 23 | FW | (China) CHN | Du Wenhui |
| 24 | MF | (China) CHN | Wang Chao |
| 25 | GK | (China) CHN | Yu Yihang |
| 26 | DF | (China) CHN | Hao Qiang |
| 27 | DF | (China) CHN | Zhou Ting |
| 28 | DF | (China) CHN | Yu Lei |
| 29 | FW | (China) CHN | Shang Yi |
| 30 | FW | (Bolivia) BOL | Milton Coimbra |
