= 2004 Beijing Guoan F.C. season =

Beijing Guoan
2004 season
- Manager: Yang Zuwu
- Stadium: Workers' Stadium
- Super League: 7th
- FA Cup: Second Round
- Super League Cup: First Round
- Average home league attendance: 10,864

The 2004 Beijing Guoan F.C. season was their first season in the Chinese Super League and 14th consecutive season in the top flight of Chinese football. They competed in the Chinese Super League, FA Cup and Super League Cup.

== First team ==
As of 9 September 2004

Note: Flags indicate national team as defined under FIFA eligibility rules; some limited exceptions apply. Players may hold more than one non-FIFA nationality.

No.	Pos.	Nation	Player
1	GK	CHN	Liu Peng
2	DF	CHN	Ji Nan
3	DF	CHN	Zhang Shuai
4	DF	CHN	Han Xu
5	DF	CHN	Hao Wei
6	MF	CHN	Sui Dongliang
7	DF	CHN	Qiu Zhonghui
8	MF	CHN	Yang Pu
9	FW	CHN	Xu Ning
10	FW	HUN	Krisztián Kenesei
12	DF	CHN	Cui Wei
13	MF	CHN	Xu Yunlong (Captain)
14	DF	CHN	Li Hongzhe
15	MF	CHN	Tao Wei
16	MF	CHN	Huang Bowen
17	FW	CHN	Gao Dawei
18	MF	CHN	Lu Jiang

No.	Pos.	Nation	Player
20	MF	CHN	Yang Hao
21	MF	CHN	Gao Leilei
22	GK	CHN	Yao Jian
23	FW	CHN	Du Wenhui
24	MF	CHN	Wang Dong
25	MF	CHN	Zhang Mengmeng
26	DF	CHN	Hao Qiang
27	MF	CHN	Lu Ming
28	MF	CHN	Zhou Ning
29	MF	CHN	Nan Fang
30	GK	CHN	Yang Shizhuo
32	FW	CHN	Yan Xiangchuang
33	GK	CHN	Yu Bo
35	MF	ROU	Dan Alexa
36	FW	SCG	Branko Jelić
37	FW	CHN	Shang Yi
