= 2005 Beijing Guoan F.C. season =

Beijing Guoan
2005 season
- Manager: Shen Xiangfu
- Stadium: Workers' Stadium
- Super League: 6th
- FA Cup: Semi-finals
- Super League Cup: Second Round
- Average home league attendance: 18,923

The 2005 Beijing Guoan F.C. season was their second consecutive season in the Chinese Super League, established in the 2004, and 15th consecutive season in the top flight of Chinese football. They competed in the Chinese Super League, FA Cup and Super League Cup.

== First team ==
As of July 15, 2005

Note: Flags indicate national team as defined under FIFA eligibility rules; some limited exceptions apply. Players may hold more than one non-FIFA nationality.

No.	Pos.	Nation	Player
1	GK	(China) CHN	Yu Bo
2	DF	(China) CHN	Ji Nan
3	DF	(China) CHN	Zhang Shuai
4	MF	(Romania) ROU	Dan Alexa
5	DF	(China) CHN	Hao Wei
6	MF	(China) CHN	Sui Dongliang
7	DF	(China) CHN	Qiu Zhonghui
8	MF	(China) CHN	Yang Pu
9	FW	(China) CHN	Xu Ning
10	FW	(China) CHN	Shang Yi
11	FW	(Serbia and Montenegro) SCG	Branko Jelić
12	DF	(China) CHN	Cui Wei
13	MF	(China) CHN	Xu Yunlong (Captain)
14	DF	(China) CHN	Li Hongzhe
15	MF	(China) CHN	Tao Wei
16	MF	(China) CHN	Huang Bowen
17	FW	(China) CHN	Gao Dawei
18	MF	(China) CHN	Lu Jiang

No.	Pos.	Nation	Player
19	MF	(China) CHN	Yang Hao
20	GK	(China) CHN	Lin Yao
21	MF	(China) CHN	Gao Leilei
22	GK	(China) CHN	Yang Zhi
23	FW	(China) CHN	Du Wenhui
24	MF	(China) CHN	Wang Dong
25	MF	(China) CHN	Zhang Mengmeng
26	DF	(China) CHN	Liu Chuan
27	MF	(China) CHN	Lu Ming
28	FW	(China) CHN	Zhang Yu
29	MF	(China) CHN	Wang Chao
30	GK	(China) CHN	Yang Shizhuo
32	FW	(China) CHN	Yan Xiangchuang
33	MF	(China) CHN	Zheng Yi
34	MF	(China) CHN	Wang Cun
35	GK	(China) CHN	Yu Yihang
36	FW	(China) CHN	Wang Zhenxing

== Friendlies ==
=== Mid–season ===
23 July 2005 Asian Tour	Beijing Guoan	2–3	(Spain) Real Madrid CF	Beijing, China
	Lu Jiang 32'; Branko Jelić 73'	Report	Raúl 37'; Guti 78'; Luís Figo 81'	Stadium: Workers' Stadium; Attendance: 40,000

26 July 2005 Asian Tour	Beijing Guoan	0–3	(England) Manchester United F.C.	Beijing, China
		Report	Scholes 40', 43'; Park 48'	Stadium: Workers' Stadium; Attendance: 24,224
