= 2007 Beijing Guoan F.C. season =

Beijing Guoan
2007 season
- Manager: Lee Jang-soo
- Stadium: Beijing Fengtai Stadium
- Super League: 2nd
- Average home league attendance: 21,571

The 2007 Beijing Guoan F.C. season was their 4th consecutive season in the Chinese Super League, established in the 2004 season, and 17th consecutive season in the top flight of Chinese football. They competed at the Chinese Super League.

== First team ==
As of August 26, 2007

Note: Flags indicate national team as defined under FIFA eligibility rules; some limited exceptions apply. Players may hold more than one non-FIFA nationality.

No.	Pos.	Nation	Player
1	GK	(China) CHN	Zhang Sipeng
2	DF	(China) CHN	Lang Zheng
3	DF	(China) CHN	Zhang Shuai
4	DF	(China) CHN	Zhou Ting
5	DF	(Brazil) BRA	Aderaldo Ferreira André
6	MF	(China) CHN	Sui Dongliang
7	MF	(China) CHN	Wang Changqing
8	MF	(China) CHN	Yang Pu
9	FW	(Honduras) HON	Walter Martínez
11	FW	(China) CHN	Yan Xiangchuang
12	DF	(China) CHN	Cui Wei
13	DF	(China) CHN	Xu Yunlong (Captain)
14	MF	(China) CHN	Wang Dong
15	MF	(China) CHN	Tao Wei
16	MF	(China) CHN	Huang Bowen
17	FW	(China) CHN	Gao Dawei
18	MF	(China) CHN	Lu Jiang
19	MF	(China) CHN	Yang Hao
20	MF	(China) CHN	Li Yao
22	GK	(China) CHN	Yang Zhi

No.	Pos.	Nation	Player
23	FW	(China) CHN	Du Wenhui
24	MF	(China) CHN	Wang Chao
25	MF	(China) CHN	Xue Shen
26	DF	(China) CHN	Hao Qiang
27	FW	(Serbia) SRB	Miodrag Pantelić
28	FW	(China) CHN	Guo Hui
29	FW	(China) CHN	Shang Yi
30	DF	(China) CHN	Zhang Yonghai
31	FW	(China) CHN	Yue Kaihao
32	FW	(China) CHN	Hu Qiling
33	MF	(China) CHN	Yao Shuang
34	GK	(China) CHN	Hou Sen
35	GK	(China) CHN	Cheng Yuelei
36	MF	(China) CHN	Zhu Yifan
37	DF	(China) CHN	Li Hongzhe
38	MF	(China) CHN	Xue Fei
39	DF	(China) CHN	Yu Lei
40	MF	(China) CHN	Wang Hao
41	MF	(China) CHN	Sang Yifei
42	FW	(Brazil) BRA	Tiago

== Friendlies ==
5 August 2007 Asian Tour	Beijing Guoan	0–3	(Spain) Barcelona	Beijing, China
		Report	Dos Santos; Andrés Iniesta; Ronaldinho	Stadium: Beijing Fengtai Stadium
