= 2008 in Chinese football =

These are the details relating to the 2008 Chinese football season.

== Overview ==
=== Domestic champions ===
| Competition | Winners |
|---|---|
| Super League | Shandong Luneng |
| League One | Jiangsu Sainty |
| League Two | Shenyang Dongjin |
| League Three | Wuhan Dongfeng Honda |
| Reserve League | Wuhan Guanggu |
| U-19 League | Beijing Guoan |
| U-19 Winners' Cup | Jiangsu FA |
| U-17 League | Changchun Yatai |
| U-17 Winners' Cup | Shandong Luneng |
| U-15 League | Shandong Luneng |
| U-15 Winners' Cup | Shandong Luneng |
| University League | Three Gorges University |
| Women's Super League | Dalian Shide |
| Women's Championship | Jiangsu Huatai |
| Women's FA Cup | Shanghai SMG |
| Women's Super Cup | Dalian Shide |
| Futsal League | Wuhan Dilong |
| Futsal FA Cup | Wuhan Dilong |
| University Futsal League | Wuhan University |
| Beach Soccer Championship | Beijing Sport University |

=== International results ===
| Competition | Results |
|---|---|
| AFC Champions League 2008 | Changchun Yatai, Group stage Beijing Guoan, Group stage |
| 2010 FIFA World Cup qualification (AFC) | Did not qualify |
| 2008 Olympics – Men's Football | 13th place |
| 2008 Olympics – Women's Football | 5th place |
| 2008 AFC Women's Asian Cup | Runners-up |
| East Asian Cup 2008 | 3rd place |
| Women's East Asian Cup 2008 | 3rd place |
| 2008 Algarve Cup | 9th place |
| 2008 FIFA U-20 Women's World Cup | Group stage |
| AFC U-19 Championship 2008 | Quarter-finals (Did not qualify for WC) |
| AFC U-16 Championship 2008 | Group stage (Did not qualify for WC) |
| AFF U19 Youth Championship 2008 | 3rd place |
| AFC U-16 Women's Championship 2009 qualification | Qualified |
| 2008 FIFA Futsal World Cup | Group stage |
| 2008 AFC Futsal Championship | 4th place (Qualified for WC) |
| Kuala Lumpur World Futsal 2008 | 9th place |
| AFC Beach Soccer Championship 2008 | 4th place (Did not qualify for WC) |
| 2008 Asian Beach Games – Beach soccer | Quarter-finals |
| 2008 Paralympics – Football 5-a-side | Silver medal |
| 2008 Paralympics – Football 7-a-side | 8th place |

== Domestic competitions ==
=== 2008 Chinese Super League ===
| Pos | Team | Pld | W | D | L | GF | GA | GD | Pts | Qualification or relegation |
|---|---|---|---|---|---|---|---|---|---|---|
| 1 | Shandong Luneng (C) | 30 | 18 | 9 | 3 | 54 | 25 | +29 | 63 | 2009 AFC Champions League Group stage |
| 2 | Shanghai Shenhua | 30 | 17 | 10 | 3 | 58 | 29 | +29 | 61 | 2009 AFC Champions League Group stage |
| 3 | Beijing Guoan | 30 | 16 | 10 | 4 | 44 | 27 | +17 | 58 | 2009 AFC Champions League Group stage |
| 4 | Tianjin TEDA | 30 | 16 | 9 | 5 | 54 | 29 | +25 | 57 | 2009 AFC Champions League Group stage |
| 5 | Shaanxi Chanba | 30 | 15 | 7 | 8 | 41 | 29 | +12 | 52 | |
| 6 | Changchun Yatai | 30 | 12 | 9 | 9 | 53 | 45 | +8 | 45 | |
| 7 | Guangzhou Pharmaceutical | 30 | 10 | 10 | 10 | 41 | 42 | −1 | 40 | |
| 8 | Qingdao Jonoon | 30 | 10 | 9 | 11 | 39 | 36 | +3 | 39 (Note: Qingdao: 6 pts, 4–1; Zhejiang: 0 pts, 1–4) | |
| 9 | Zhejiang Greentown | 30 | 9 | 12 | 9 | 38 | 32 | +6 | 39 | |
| 10 | Henan Construction | 30 | 9 | 9 | 12 | 30 | 31 | −1 | 36 | |
| 11 | Changsha Ginde | 30 | 7 | 13 | 10 | 28 | 36 | −8 | 34 | |
| 12 | Shenzhen Xiangxue | 30 | 8 | 9 | 13 | 35 | 34 | +1 | 33 | |
| 13 | Chengdu Blades | 30 | 7 | 11 | 12 | 30 | 37 | −7 | 32 | |
| 14 | Dalian Shide | 30 | 6 | 12 | 12 | 30 | 40 | −10 | 30 | |
| 15 | Liaoning Whowin (R) | 30 | 6 | 9 | 15 | 34 | 47 | −13 | 27 | Relegated to China League One |
| 16 | Wuhan Optics Valley | 30 | 0 | 0 | 30 | 0 | 90 | −90 | 0 (Note: Wuhan Optics Valley withdrew from the league and folded; all of their matches were scratched and counted as 3–0 wins to their opponents.) | Withdrew from the league and folded |

Updated to match(es) played on November 30, 2008. Source: CSL
Rules for classification: 1) points; 2) head-to-head points; 3) head-to-head goal difference; 4) head-to-head goals scored; 5) goal difference; 6) number of goals scored.
(C) Champions; (R) Relegated

=== 2008 China League One ===
| Pos | Team | Pld | W | D | L | GF | GA | GD | Pts | Promotion or relegation |
|---|---|---|---|---|---|---|---|---|---|---|
| 1 | Jiangsu Sainty (C, P) | 24 | 19 | 2 | 3 | 56 | 24 | +32 | 59 | Promotion to Chinese Super League |
| 2 | Chongqing Lifan (P) | 24 | 12 | 7 | 5 | 34 | 19 | +15 | 43 | Promotion to Chinese Super League |
| 3 | Nanchang Bayi Hengyuan | 24 | 11 | 9 | 4 | 37 | 24 | +13 | 42 | |
| 4 | Anhui Jiufang | 24 | 7 | 9 | 8 | 33 | 37 | −4 | 30 | |
| 5 | Sichuan | 24 | 7 | 8 | 9 | 27 | 36 | −9 | 29 | |
| 6 | Shanghai East Asia | 24 | 7 | 7 | 10 | 26 | 30 | −4 | 28 (Note: Shanghai 10 pts; Beijing A. 9 pts; Qingdao 8 pts; Yanbian 6 pts) | |
| 7 | Beijing BIT | 24 | 7 | 7 | 10 | 27 | 39 | −12 | 28 | |
| 8 | Qingdao Hailifeng | 24 | 7 | 7 | 10 | 33 | 38 | −5 | 28 | |
| 9 | Yanbian | 24 | 8 | 4 | 12 | 32 | 39 | −7 | 28 | |
| 10 | Nanjing Yoyo | 24 | 6 | 9 | 9 | 35 | 38 | −3 | 27 (Note: Wuxi 1−0 Nanjing; Nanjing 1−0 Wuxi) | |
| 11 | Wuxi Zobon | 24 | 7 | 6 | 11 | 24 | 33 | −9 | 27 | |
| 12 | Beijing Hongdeng | 24 | 5 | 11 | 8 | 24 | 24 | 0 | 26 | |
| 13 | Yantai Yiteng (R) | 24 | 5 | 10 | 9 | 28 | 35 | −7 | 25 | Relegation to China League Two |

Updated to match(es) played on 15 November 2008. Source: League Table
Rules for classification: 1) points; 2) head-to-head points; 3) head-to-head goal difference; 4) head-to-head goals scored; 5) goal difference; 6) number of goals scored.
(C) Champions; (P) Promoted; (R) Relegated

=== 2008 China League Two ===
==== Southern Group ====
| Pos | Team | Pld | W | D | L | GF | GA | GD | Pts | Qualification |
|---|---|---|---|---|---|---|---|---|---|---|
| 1 | Guangdong Sunray Cave (Q, P) | 14 | 9 | 4 | 1 | 34 | 16 | +18 | 31 | Qualification for Play-offs semi-final |
| 2 | Tianjin Songjiang (Q) | 14 | 9 | 2 | 3 | 28 | 11 | +17 | 29 | Qualification for Play-offs first round |
| 3 | Hunan Billows (Q) | 14 | 9 | 1 | 4 | 22 | 12 | +10 | 28 | Qualification for Play-offs first round |
| 4 | Guizhou Zhicheng (Q) | 14 | 7 | 4 | 3 | 22 | 17 | +5 | 25 | Qualification for Play-offs first round |
| 5 | Suzhou Trips | 14 | 5 | 5 | 4 | 17 | 15 | +2 | 20 | |
| 6 | Wenzhou Tomorrow | 14 | 2 | 3 | 9 | 7 | 17 | −10 | 9 | |
| 7 | Ningbo Huaao | 14 | 1 | 4 | 9 | 10 | 25 | −15 | 7 | |
| 8 | Zhanjiang Tiandi No.1 | 14 | 2 | 1 | 11 | 4 | 31 | −27 | 7 | |

Updated to match(es) played on unknown. Source:
(P) Promoted; (Q) Qualified for the phase indicated

==== Northern Group ====
| Pos | Team | Pld | W | D | L | GF | GA | GD | Pts | Qualification |
|---|---|---|---|---|---|---|---|---|---|---|
| 1 | Shenyang Dongjin (Q, C, P) | 14 | 9 | 5 | 0 | 23 | 7 | +16 | 32 | Qualification for Play-offs semi-final |
| 2 | Shijiazhuang Tiangong (Q) | 14 | 7 | 5 | 2 | 22 | 16 | +6 | 26 | Qualification for Play-offs first round |
| 3 | Hangzhou Sanchao (Q) | 14 | 7 | 4 | 3 | 20 | 13 | +7 | 25 | Qualification for Play-offs first round |
| 4 | Tianjin Huochetou (Q) | 14 | 7 | 2 | 5 | 22 | 12 | +10 | 23 | Qualification for Play-offs first round |
| 5 | Shaanxi Star | 14 | 5 | 4 | 5 | 21 | 17 | +4 | 19 | |
| 6 | Xinjiang Sport Lottery | 14 | 4 | 5 | 5 | 12 | 19 | −7 | 17 | |
| 7 | Tianjin Dongli | 14 | 2 | 2 | 10 | 7 | 21 | −14 | 8 | |
| 8 | Nanjing Baotai | 14 | 1 | 1 | 12 | 6 | 28 | −22 | 4 | |

Updated to match(es) played on unknown. Source:
(C) Champions; (P) Promoted; (Q) Qualified for the phase indicated

Rules for classification: 1st points; 2nd head-to-head points; 3rd head-to-head goal difference; 4th head-to-head goals scored; 5th goal difference; 6th goals scored.

==== Play-offs ====
| Team 1 | Agg. | Team 2 | 1st leg | 2nd leg |
|---|---|---|---|---|
| Shijiazhuang Tiangong | 1–2 | Hunan Billows | 0–2 | 1 – 0 |
| China Three Gorges University | 6–1 | Shenzhen University | 3–0 | 3 – 1 |
| Tianjin Huochetou | 5–2 | Guizhou Zhicheng | 4–0 | 1 – 2 |
| Hangzhou Sanchao | 1–6 | Tianjin Songjiang | 0–2 | 1 – 4 |

| Team 1 | Agg. | Team 2 | 1st leg | 2nd leg |
|---|---|---|---|---|
| Hunan Billows | 1–5 | Tianjin Huochetou | 0–1 | 1 – 4 |
| China Three Gorges University | 2 – 2 (P 5–4) | Tianjin Songjiang | 0–2 | 2 – 0 (aet) |

2008-12-19
09:30

| Shenyang Dongjin | 0–1 | China Three Gorges University |
|---|---|---|
| | | Hu Xi 23' |

Longquan Football Stadium, Chengdu

2008-12-19
15:00

| Tianjin Huochetou | 0–1 | Guangdong Sunray Cave |
|---|---|---|
| | | Yin Hongbo 77' |

Longquan Football Stadium, Chengdu

2008-12-21
09:30

| Guangdong Sunray Cave | 3–1 | Tianjin Huochetou |
|---|---|---|
| Ye Weichao 4'; Yu Jianfeng 38' (pen.); Cong Tianhao 54' | (Report) | Feng Renliang 43' |

Longquan Football Stadium, Chengdu
Referee: Tan Hai

Guangdong Sunray Cave won 4–1 on aggregate and promoted to China League One 2009.

2008-12-21
15:00

| China Three Gorges University | 0 – 1 (aet) | Shenyang Dongjin |
|---|---|---|
| | | Deng Li 65' |
Penalties
| | 3–4 |

Longquan Football Stadium, Chengdu

Shenyang Dongjin 1–1 China Three Gorges University on aggregate. Shenyang Dongjin won 4–3 on penalties and promoted to China League One 2009.

2008-12-23
09:00

| China Three Gorges University | 2–1 | Tianjin Huochetou |
|---|---|---|
| Qi Zhongxi 29'; Xiao Ze 70' | | Shan Tong 78' |

Longquan Football Stadium, Chengdu

2008-12-23
11:00

| Shenyang Dongjin | 1–0 | Guangdong Sunray Cave |
|---|---|---|
| Du Ping 78' |

Longquan Football Stadium, Chengdu

=== China League Three 2008 ===
- Final: Wuhan Dongfeng Honda 6–1 Hunchun Procuratorate

=== Youth competitions ===
| Competition | Winners |
|---|---|
| Reserve League | Wuhan Optics Valley |
| U-19 League | Beijing Guoan |
| U-19 Winners' Cup | Jiangsu FA |
| U-17 League | Changchun Yatai |
| U-17 Winners' Cup | Shandong Luneng |
| U-15 League | Shandong Luneng |
| U-15 Winners' Cup | Shandong Luneng |
| University League | China Three Gorges University |

=== Women's competitions ===
| Competition | Winners |
|---|---|
| Women's Super League | Dalian Shide |
| Women's Championship | Jiangsu Huatai |
| FA Women's Cup | Shanghai SMG |
| Women's Super Cup | Dalian Shide |

=== Futsal competitions ===
| Competition | Winners |
|---|---|
| Futsal League | Wuhan Dilong |
| FA Futsal Cup | Wuhan Dilong |
| University Futsal League | Wuhan University |

=== Beach soccer competitions ===
| Competition | Winners |
|---|---|
| Beach Soccer Championship | Beijing Sport University |

== International clubs competitions ==
=== AFC Champions League 2008 ===
2008-03-12

| Changchun Yatai (China) | 2–1 | (Vietnam) Bình Dương |
|---|---|---|
| Du Zhenyu 4'; Cui Wei 70' | Report | Nguyễn Anh Đức 53' |

Changchun City Stadium, Changchun
Attendance: 10,000
Referee: Ali Al Badwawi (UAE)

2008-03-19

| Adelaide United (Australia) | 0–0 | (China) Changchun Yatai |
|---|---|---|
| | Report |

Hindmarsh Stadium, Adelaide
Attendance: 10,510
Referee: Hiroyoshi Takayama (Japan)

2008-04-09

| Changchun Yatai (China) | 1–0 | (South Korea) Pohang Steelers |
|---|---|---|
| Dah Zadi 86' | Report |

Changchun City Stadium, Changchun
Attendance: 18,000
Referee: Abdulrahman Abdou (Qatar)

2008-04-23

| Pohang Steelers (South Korea) | 2–2 | (China) Changchun Yatai |
|---|---|---|
| Hwang Jae-Won 64'; Hwang Jin-Sung 90' | Report | Wang Dong 35'; Du Zhenyu 70' |

Steelyard Stadium, Pohang
Attendance: 5,468
Referee: Satop Tongkhan (Thailand)

2008-05-07

| Bình Dương (Vietnam) | 0–5 | (China) Changchun Yatai |
|---|---|---|
| | Report | Wang Bo 2' 37'; Dah Zadi 13'; Yan Feng 78'; Caballero 90' (pen.) |

Gò Đậu Stadium, Thủ Dầu Một
Attendance: 4,000
Referee: Khalil Ibrahim Al Ghamdi (Saudi Arabia)

2008-05-22

| Changchun Yatai (China) | 0–0 | (Australia) Adelaide United |
|---|---|---|
| | Report |

Changchun City Stadium, Changchun
Attendance: 20,000
Referee: Subkhiddin Mohd Salleh (Malaysia)

| Team | Pld | W | D | L | GF | GA | GD | Pts |
|---|---|---|---|---|---|---|---|---|
| (Australia) Adelaide United | 6 | 4 | 2 | 0 | 9 | 2 | 7 | 14 |
| (China) Changchun Yatai | 6 | 3 | 3 | 0 | 10 | 3 | 7 | 12 |
| (South Korea) Pohang Steelers | 6 | 1 | 2 | 3 | 6 | 7 | −1 | 5 |
| (Vietnam) Bình Dương | 6 | 0 | 1 | 5 | 4 | 17 | −13 | 1 |

2008-03-12

| Nam Dinh (Vietnam) | 1–3 | (China) Beijing Guoan |
|---|---|---|
| Lê Văn Duyệt 14' | Report | Yan Xiangchuang 57'; Du Wenhui 60'; Zhang Shuai 90+1' |

Mỹ Đình National Stadium, Hanoi
Attendance: 600
Referee: Kim Dong-Jin (Korea Republic)

2008-03-19

| Beijing Guoan (China) | 4–2 | (Thailand) Krung Thai Bank |
|---|---|---|
| Du Wenhui 39' 73'; Martínez 51' 75' | Report | Thansopa 58'; Pichitchotirat 63' |

Beijing Fengtai Stadium, Beijing
Attendance: 14,000
Referee: Atallah Jatli (Kuwait)

2008-04-09

| Kashima Antlers (Japan) | 1–0 | (China) Beijing Guoan |
|---|---|---|
| Danilo 52' | Report |

Kashima Soccer Stadium, Kashima
Attendance: 6,487
Referee: Mohsen Torky (Iran)

2008-04-23

| Beijing Guoan (China) | 1–0 | (Japan) Kashima Antlers |
|---|---|---|
| Tiago 41' | Report |

Beijing Fengtai Stadium, Beijing
Attendance: 16,000
Referee: Subkhiddin Mohd Salleh (Malaysia)

2008-05-07

| Beijing Guoan (China) | 3–0 | (Vietnam) Nam Dinh |
|---|---|---|
| Guo Hui 14' (pen.); Yang Hao 32' 78' | Report |

Beijing Fengtai Stadium, Beijing
Attendance: 9,000
Referee: Kadhum Auda (Iraq)

2008-05-21

| Krung Thai Bank (Thailand) | 5–3 | (China) Beijing Guoan |
|---|---|---|
| Thansopa 10' 44' 49' 69' (pen.); Pichitchotirat 27' | Report | Tiago 67' (pen.) 70' 77' (pen.) |

Chulalongkorn University Sports Stadium, Bangkok
Attendance: 400
Referee: Fareed Ali Mohamed Al Marzouqi (UAE)

| Team | Pld | W | D | L | GF | GA | GD | Pts |
|---|---|---|---|---|---|---|---|---|
| (Japan) Kashima Antlers | 6 | 5 | 0 | 1 | 28 | 3 | 25 | 15 |
| (China) Beijing Guoan | 6 | 4 | 0 | 2 | 14 | 9 | 5 | 12 |
| (Thailand) Krung Thai Bank | 6 | 2 | 1 | 3 | 20 | 27 | −7 | 7 |
| (Vietnam) Nam Dinh | 6 | 0 | 1 | 5 | 4 | 27 | −23 | 1 |

== National teams competitions ==
=== Men's senior team ===
==== 2010 FIFA World Cup qualification (AFC) ====
2008-02-06
16:30 UTC+4

| Iraq | 1–1 | China |
|---|---|---|
| Hawar Mulla 51' (pen.) | Report | Zheng Zhi 75' |

Al-Rashid Stadium, Dubai (United Arab Emirates)
Attendance: 11,000
Referee: Mohsen Torky (Iran)

2008-03-26
14:00 UTC+8

| China | 0–0 | Australia |
|---|---|---|
| | Report |

Tuodong Stadium, Kunming
Attendance: 32,000
Referee: Mohamed Al Saeedi (United Arab Emirates)

2008-06-02
19:00 UTC+3

| Qatar | 0 – 0 | China |
|---|---|---|
| | Report |

Jassim Bin Hamad Stadium, Doha
Attendance: 9,000
Referee: Muhsen Basma (Syria)

2008-06-07
20:00 UTC+8

| China | 0–1 | Qatar |
|---|---|---|
| | Report | Quintana 14' (pen.) |

Tianjin Olympic Centre Stadium, Tianjin
Attendance: 50,000
Referee: Tallat Najm (Lebanon)

2008-06-14
20:00 UTC+8

| China | 1–2 | Iraq |
|---|---|---|
| Zhou Haibin 33' | Report | Emad Mohammed 41'; Nashat Akram 65' |

Tianjin Olympic Centre Stadium, Tianjin
Attendance: 39,000
Referee: Abdul Bashir (Singapore)

2008-06-22
18:00 UTC+10

| Australia | 0–1 | China |
|---|---|---|
| | Report | Sun Xiang 12' |

ANZ Stadium, Sydney
Attendance: 70,054
Referee: Khalil Al Ghamdi (Saudi Arabia)

| Pos | Team | Pld | W | D | L | GF | GA | GD | Pts | Qualification |
|---|---|---|---|---|---|---|---|---|---|---|
| 1 | Australia | 6 | 3 | 1 | 2 | 7 | 3 | +4 | 10 | Fourth round |
| 2 | Qatar | 6 | 3 | 1 | 2 | 5 | 6 | −1 | 10 | Fourth round |
| 3 | Iraq | 6 | 2 | 1 | 3 | 4 | 6 | −2 | 7 | |
| 4 | China | 6 | 1 | 3 | 2 | 3 | 4 | −1 | 6 | |

==== East Asian Cup 2008 ====
All times local (GMT+8)

February 17, 2008
15:30

| China | 2–3 (0–1) | South Korea |
|---|---|---|
| Zhou Haibin 46'; Liu Jian 61' | report | Park Chu-Young 42', 63'; Kwak Tae-Hwi 90+1' |

Olympic Sports Centre, Chongqing
Attendance: 25,000
Referee: Mohsen Torky (Iran)

February 20, 2008
18:15

| China | 0–1 (0–1) | Japan |
|---|---|---|
| | Report | Koji Yamase 17' |

Olympic Sports Centre, Chongqing
Attendance: 38,000
Referee: O Tae Song (DPR Korea)

February 23, 2008
20:45

| China | 3–1 (1–1) | North Korea |
|---|---|---|
| Zhu Ting 45'; Wang Dong 55'; Hao Junmin 88' | Report | Ji Yun-Nam 35' |

Olympic Sports Centre, Chongqing
Attendance: 30,500
Referee: Mohsen Torky (IR Iran)

| Team | Pts | Pld | W | D | L | GF | GA | GD |
|---|---|---|---|---|---|---|---|---|
| (South Korea) Korea Republic | 5 | 3 | 1 | 2 | 0 | 5 | 4 | +1 |
| Japan | 5 | 3 | 1 | 2 | 0 | 3 | 2 | +1 |
| China | 3 | 3 | 1 | 0 | 2 | 5 | 5 | +0 |
| North Korea | 2 | 3 | 0 | 2 | 1 | 3 | 5 | −2 |

==== Friendly matches ====
| Date | Venue | Opponent | Result | Scoreline | China scorers |
|---|---|---|---|---|---|
| January 10 | (United Arab Emirates) Dubai | United Arab Emirates | Drawn | 0–0 | — |
| January 20 | (China) Zhongshan | Lebanon | Drawn | 0–0 | — |
| January 27 | (China) Zhongshan | Syria | Won | 2–1 | Qu Bo 64'; Zhu Ting 90' |
| March 15 | (China) Kunming | Thailand | Drawn | 3–3 | Qu Bo 34'; Han Peng 67'; Zhu Ting 90' |
| April 16 | (United States) Seattle | Mexico | Lost | 0–1 | — |
| April 23 | (United States) Los Angeles | El Salvador | Drawn | 2–2 | Xiao Zhanbo 62' pen Qu Bo 63' |
| May 25 | (China) Kunshan | Jordan | Won | 2–0 | Hao Junmin 23' pen Li Weifeng 48' |
| Dec 17 | (Oman) Muscat | Oman | Lost | 1–3 | Qu Bo 58' |
| Dec 19 | (Oman) Muscat | Iran | Lost | 0–2 | |
| Dec 21 | (Jordan) Amman | Jordan | Won | 1–0 | Cao Yang 77' |

=== Men's U-23 team ===
==== Football at the 2008 Summer Olympics – Men's tournament ====
2008-08-07
19:45

| China | 1–1 | New Zealand |
|---|---|---|
| Dong 88' | (Report) | Brockie 53' |

Shenyang Olympic Stadium, Shenyang
Attendance: 41,407
Referee: Martín Vázquez (Uruguay)

2008-08-10
19:45

| Belgium | 2–0 | China |
|---|---|---|
| Dembélé 8'; Mirallas 80' | (Report) |

Shenyang Olympic Stadium, Shenyang
Attendance: 45,756
Referee: Héctor Baldassi (Argentina)

2008-08-13
19:45

| China | 0–3 | Brazil |
|---|---|---|
| | (Report) | Diego 18'; Thiago Neves 69' 73' |

Qinhuangdao Olympic Sports Centre Stadium, Qinhuangdao
Attendance: 38,790
Referee: Jerome Damon (South Africa)

| Team | Pld | W | D | L | GF | GA | GD | Pts |
|---|---|---|---|---|---|---|---|---|
| Brazil | 3 | 3 | 0 | 0 | 9 | 0 | +9 | 9 |
| Belgium | 3 | 2 | 0 | 1 | 3 | 1 | +2 | 6 |
| China | 3 | 0 | 1 | 2 | 1 | 6 | −5 | 1 |
| New Zealand | 3 | 0 | 1 | 2 | 1 | 7 | −6 | 1 |

=== Men's U-20 team ===
==== AFC U-19 Championship 2008 ====
2008-11-01
18:45

| China | 6–0 | Tajikistan |
|---|---|---|
| Farkhod Vasiev 19' (o.g.); Zhou Liao 21' 33'; Zhang Yuan 28'; Cao Yunding 41'; Piao Cheng 45' | (Report) |

Prince Mohamed bin Fahd Stadium, Dammam
Attendance: 200
Referee: (Yemen) Mukthar Al-Yarimi

2008-11-03
16:15

| Lebanon | 1–3 | China |
|---|---|---|
| Mannaa 45+2' | (Report) | Tan Yang 58'; Hui Jiakang 64'; Zhou Liao 90+1' |

Prince Mohamed bin Fahd Stadium, Dammam
Attendance: 150
Referee: (Bangladesh) Tayeb Shamsuzzaman

2008-11-05
16:15

| North Korea | 0–0 | China |
|---|---|---|
| | (Report) |

Prince Mohamed bin Fahd Stadium, Dammam
Attendance: 100
Referee: (Qatar) Abdulrahman Hussain

| Team | Pts | Pld | W | D | L | GF | GA | GD |
|---|---|---|---|---|---|---|---|---|
| China | 7 | 3 | 2 | 1 | 0 | 9 | 1 | +8 |
| North Korea | 5 | 3 | 1 | 2 | 0 | 5 | 1 | +4 |
| Tajikistan | 4 | 3 | 1 | 1 | 1 | 6 | 8 | −2 |
| Lebanon | 0 | 3 | 0 | 0 | 3 | 2 | 12 | −10 |

2008-11-08
16:15

| China | 0 – 0 (AET) (3–4 PSO) | Uzbekistan |
|---|---|---|
| | (Report) |

Prince Saud bin Jalawi Stadium, Khobar
Referee: (Australia) Benjamin Williams

==== AFF U19 Youth Championship 2008 ====
October 5, 2008
19:30 UTC+7

| Australia | 3–1 | China |
|---|---|---|
| Lujic 6', 12'; Nichols 74' | | 4' Piao Cheng |

Rajamangala National Stadium
Referee: –

October 7, 2008
19:30 UTC+7

| China | 0–3 | Thailand |
|---|---|---|
| | | 28', 74' Jaroensuk; 58' Thawikan |

Rajamangala National Stadium
Referee: –

October 9, 2008
17:00 UTC+7

| China | 0–1 | South Korea |
|---|---|---|
| | | 53' An Jung-Hun |

Rajamangala National Stadium
Referee: –

| Team | Pld | W | D | L | GF | GA | GD | Pts |
|---|---|---|---|---|---|---|---|---|
| Australia | 3 | 2 | 1 | 0 | 5 | 2 | 3 | 7 |
| South Korea | 3 | 2 | 1 | 0 | 2 | 0 | 2 | 7 |
| Thailand | 3 | 1 | 0 | 2 | 4 | 3 | +1 | 3 |
| China | 3 | 0 | 0 | 3 | 1 | 7 | −6 | 0 |

Third place match

October 11, 2008
17:00 UTC+7

| Thailand | 0–3 | China |
|---|---|---|
| | | 20', 52' Tan Yang; 42' Yu Yang |

Rajamangala National Stadium
Referee: –

=== Men's U-17 team ===
==== AFC U-16 Championship 2008 ====
2008-10-05
16:00

| China | 2–1 | Turkmenistan |
|---|---|---|
| Nan Yunqi 32'; Guo Yi 83' | (Report) | Durdiyev 30' |

Pakhtakor Stadium
Attendance: 1,200
Referee: Torky (Iran)

2008-10-07
16:00

| Australia | 2 – 1 | China |
|---|---|---|
| Lum 16' (pen.); Ibrahim 50' | (Report) | Jin Jingdao 45+1' (pen.) |

Pakhtakor Stadium
Attendance: 4,000
Referee: Torky (Iran)

2008-10-09
15:00

| China | 1–1 | Saudi Arabia |
|---|---|---|
| Yu Baobao 52' | (Report) | Abdulrahim 71' |

Pakhtakor Stadium
Attendance: 700
Referee: Kovalenko (Uzbekistan)

| Team | Pts | Pld | W | D | L | GF | GA | GD |
|---|---|---|---|---|---|---|---|---|
| Australia | 9 | 3 | 3 | 0 | 0 | 11 | 2 | +9 |
| Saudi Arabia | 4 | 3 | 1 | 1 | 1 | 6 | 4 | +2 |
| China | 4 | 3 | 1 | 1 | 1 | 4 | 4 | 0 |
| Turkmenistan | 0 | 3 | 0 | 0 | 3 | 1 | 12 | −11 |

=== Women's senior team ===
==== Football at the 2008 Summer Olympics – Women's tournament ====
2008-08-06
19:45

| China | 2–1 | Sweden |
|---|---|---|
| Xu 6'; Han 72' | (Report) | Schelin 38' |

Tianjin Olympic Center Stadium, Tianjin
Attendance: 37,902
Referee: Hong Eun-ah (Korea Republic)

2008-08-09
19:45

| Canada | 1–1 | China |
|---|---|---|
| Sinclair 34' | (Report) | Xu 36' |

Tianjin Olympic Center Stadium, Tianjin
Attendance: 52,600
Referee: Dagmar Damková (Czech Republic)

2008-08-12
19:45

| China | 2–0 | Argentina |
|---|---|---|
| Han 52'; Gu 90' | (Report) |

Qinhuangdao Olympic Sports Centre Stadium, Qinhuangdao
Attendance: 31,492
Referee: Nicole Petignat (Switzerland)

| Team | Pld | W | D | L | GF | GA | GD | Pts |
|---|---|---|---|---|---|---|---|---|
| China | 3 | 2 | 1 | 0 | 5 | 2 | +3 | 7 |
| Sweden | 3 | 2 | 0 | 1 | 4 | 3 | +1 | 6 |
| Canada | 3 | 1 | 1 | 1 | 4 | 4 | 0 | 4 |
| Argentina | 3 | 0 | 0 | 3 | 1 | 5 | −4 | 0 |

2008-08-15
21:00

| China | 0–2 | Japan |
|---|---|---|
| | (Report) | Sawa 15'; Nagasato 80' |

Qinhuangdao Olympic Sports Centre Stadium, Qinhuangdao
Attendance: 28,459
Referee: Christine Beck (Germany)

==== 2008 AFC Women's Asian Cup ====
2008-05-28
19:30

| China | 1–0 | Vietnam |
|---|---|---|
| Xu Yuan 31' | Report |

Thống Nhất Stadium
Attendance: 5,500
Referee: Hong Eun-Ah (Korea Republic)

2008-05-30
19:30

| Thailand | 1–5 | China |
|---|---|---|
| Nisa Romyen 37' | Report | Liu Sa 11'; Qu Feifei 20' 73'; Xu Yuan 22'; Pu Wei 86' |

Thống Nhất Stadium
Attendance: 300
Referee: Baba Sachiko (Japan)

2008-06-01
18:30

| China | 0–1 | North Korea |
|---|---|---|
| | Report | Ri Un-Gyong 34' |

Army Stadium
Attendance: 200
Referee: Tammy Ogston (Australia)

| Team | Pts | Pld | W | D | L | GF | GA | GD |
|---|---|---|---|---|---|---|---|---|
| North Korea | 9 | 3 | 3 | 0 | 0 | 9 | 0 | +9 |
| China | 6 | 3 | 2 | 0 | 1 | 6 | 2 | +4 |
| Vietnam | 3 | 3 | 1 | 0 | 2 | 1 | 4 | −3 |
| Thailand | 0 | 3 | 0 | 0 | 3 | 1 | 11 | −10 |

2008-06-05
19:00

| Japan | 1–3 | China |
|---|---|---|
| Homare Sawa 47' | Report | Wang Dandan 63' 68'; Han Duan 75' |

Thống Nhất Stadium
Attendance: 1,000
Referee: Bentla D'Coth (India)

2008-06-08
19:00

| North Korea | 2–1 | China |
|---|---|---|
| Ri Kum-Suk 55'; Lee Yung-Ae 68' | Report | Bi Yan 12' |

Thống Nhất Stadium
Attendance: 2,500
Referee: Sachiko Baba (Japan)

==== 2008 Algarve Cup ====
March 5, 2008
13:45

| China | 0–4 | United States |
|---|---|---|
| | | Tarpley 5'; Heath 47'; Wambach 64'; Lloyd 69' |

Municipal Stadium, Albufeira

March 7, 2008
16:15

| Norway | 3–1 | China |
|---|---|---|
| unknown 42' (o.g.); Storløkken 64'; Wiik 90' | | Yue Guo 62' |

Municipal Stadium, Albufeira

March 10, 2008
15:00

| China | 0–2 | Italy |
|---|---|---|
| | | Conti 41'; Panico 70' |

Municipal Stadium, Loulé

| Team | Pts | Pld | W | D | L | GF | GA | GD |
|---|---|---|---|---|---|---|---|---|
| United States | 9 | 3 | 3 | 0 | 0 | 10 | 0 | +10 |
| Norway | 6 | 3 | 2 | 0 | 1 | 7 | 7 | 0 |
| Italy | 3 | 3 | 1 | 0 | 2 | 4 | 6 | −2 |
| China | 0 | 3 | 0 | 0 | 3 | 1 | 9 | −8 |

March 12, 2008
10:00

| China | 1–1 (5–4 PSO) | Portugal |
|---|---|---|
| Bi Yan 1' | | Fernandes 34' |
Penalties
| Li Jie (penalty scored); Xu Yuan (penalty scored); Wang Kun (penalty missed); Zhang Ying (penalty scored); Bi Yan (penalty scored); Song Xiaoli (penalty scored) | 5–4 | (penalty scored) Matias; (penalty scored) Vieira; (penalty missed) Fernandes; (penalty scored) Brandão; (penalty scored) Couto; (penalty missed) Valinho |

CD Montechoro, Albufeira

==== Women's East Asian Cup 2008 ====
February 18, 2008
19:30

| China | 3–2 | South Korea |
|---|---|---|
| Han Duan 9' 78'; Xu Yuan 86' | | Park Hee-young 59' 66' |

Yongchuan Stadium, Chongqing
Attendance: 23,000
Referee: Kamnueng (Thailand)

February 21, 2008
19:30

| China | 0–0 | North Korea |

Yongchuan Stadium, Chongqing
Attendance: 23,000
Referee: Cha (Korea Republic)

February 24, 2008
17:00

| China | 0–3 | Japan |
|---|---|---|
| | | Ohno 19', 42'; Nagasato 55' |

Yongchuan Stadium, Chongqing
Attendance: 25,000
Referee: Kamnueng (Thailand)

| Team | Pts | Pld | W | D | L | GF | GA | GD |
|---|---|---|---|---|---|---|---|---|
| Japan | 9 | 3 | 3 | 0 | 0 | 8 | 2 | +6 |
| North Korea | 4 | 3 | 1 | 1 | 1 | 6 | 3 | +3 |
| China | 4 | 3 | 1 | 1 | 1 | 3 | 5 | −2 |
| South Korea | 0 | 3 | 0 | 0 | 3 | 2 | 9 | −7 |

=== Women's U-20 team ===
==== 2008 FIFA U-20 Women's World Cup ====
2008-11-19
12:00

| China | 0–0 | Argentina |
|---|---|---|
| | (Report) |

Nelson Oyarzún Arenas Stadium, Chillán
Attendance: 3,500
Referee: (Hungary) Gyoengyi Gaal

2008-11-22
15:00

| China | 0–2 | France |
|---|---|---|
| | (Report) | Delie 70'; Le Sommer 87' |

Nelson Oyarzún Arenas Stadium, Chillán
Attendance: 7,590
Referee: (Guinea) Therese Sagno

2008-11-26
16:00

| United States | 0–2 | China |
|---|---|---|
| | (Report) | Zhang 52'; Liu 58' |

Germán Becker Stadium, Temuco
Referee: (Austria) Tanja Schett

| Team | Pld | W | D | L | GF | GA | GD | Pts |
|---|---|---|---|---|---|---|---|---|
| United States | 3 | 2 | 0 | 1 | 6 | 2 | +4 | 6 |
| France | 3 | 2 | 0 | 1 | 5 | 4 | +1 | 6 |
| China | 3 | 1 | 1 | 1 | 2 | 2 | 0 | 4 |
| Argentina | 3 | 0 | 1 | 2 | 1 | 6 | −5 | 1 |

=== Women's U-17 team ===
==== AFC U-16 Women's Championship 2009 qualification ====
2008-11-09

| Chinese Taipei | 1–6 | China |
|---|---|---|
| | Report |

KLFA Stadium, Kuala Lumpur

2008-11-11

| India | 0–1 | China |
|---|---|---|
| | Report |

KLFA Stadium, Kuala Lumpur

2008-11-13

| Uzbekistan | 0–9 | China |
|---|---|---|
| | Report |

KLFA Stadium, Kuala Lumpur

| Team | Pts | Pld | W | D | L | GF | GA | GD |
|---|---|---|---|---|---|---|---|---|
| China | 9 | 3 | 3 | 0 | 0 | 16 | 1 | +15 |
| Chinese Taipei | 6 | 3 | 2 | 0 | 1 | 4 | 7 | −3 |
| India | 3 | 3 | 1 | 0 | 2 | 4 | 4 | 0 |
| Uzbekistan | 0 | 3 | 0 | 0 | 3 | 1 | 13 | −12 |

=== Futsal team ===
==== 2008 FIFA Futsal World Cup ====
| Team | Pld | W | D | L | GF | GA | Diff | Pts |
|---|---|---|---|---|---|---|---|---|
| Ukraine | 4 | 3 | 1 | 0 | 17 | 7 | 10 | 10 |
| Argentina | 4 | 3 | 1 | 0 | 13 | 5 | 8 | 10 |
| Guatemala | 4 | 2 | 0 | 2 | 14 | 9 | 5 | 6 |
| Egypt | 4 | 1 | 0 | 3 | 9 | 12 | −3 | 3 |
| China | 4 | 0 | 0 | 4 | 5 | 25 | −20 | 0 |

| Argentina | 5 - 0 | China |
| China | 2 - 6 | Egypt |
| China | 1 - 10 | Guatemala |
| Ukraine | 4 - 2 | China |

==== 2008 AFC Futsal Championship ====
2008-05-11
21:20

| Tajikistan | 0–9 | China |
|---|---|---|
| | Report |

2008-05-12
16:30

| China | 1–8 | Iran |
|---|---|---|
| | Report |

2008-05-13
14:15

| China | 9–0 | Kuwait |
|---|---|---|
| | Report |

| Team | Pld | W | D | L | GF | GA | Diff | Pts |
|---|---|---|---|---|---|---|---|---|
| Iran | 3 | 3 | 0 | 0 | 34 | 1 | +33 | 9 |
| China | 3 | 2 | 0 | 1 | 19 | 8 | +11 | 6 |
| Tajikistan | 3 | 1 | 0 | 2 | 6 | 27 | −21 | 3 |
| Kuwait | 3 | 0 | 0 | 3 | 4 | 27 | −23 | 0 |

2008-05-15
15:00

| Uzbekistan | 1–4 | China |
|---|---|---|
| Tajibaev 38' | Report | Liu Xinyi 19'; Wu Zhuoxi 33'; Liang Shuang 39'; Li Xin 39' |

Numibutr Stadium, Bangkok
Attendance: 150
Referee: (Japan) Kazuya Isokawa

2008-05-16
15:00

| Thailand | 7–3 | China |
|---|---|---|
| Saisorn 5', 14'; Innui 10', 25'; Munjarern 18'; Janta 20'; Santanaprasit 26' | Report | Liu Xinyi 18'; Li Jian 33'; Li Xin 36' |

Numibutr Stadium, Bangkok
Attendance: 2800
Referee: (South Korea) Kim Jang-Kwan

2008-05-18
14:30

| China | 3–5 | Japan |
|---|---|---|
| Zhang Xi 25'; Liu Xinyi 33'; Liang Shuang 36' | Report | Ono 7'; Inada 22'; Kogure 35'; Komiyama 40', 40' |

Numibutr Stadium, Bangkok
Attendance: 3000
Referee: (Kyrgyzstan) Nurdin Bukuev

==== KL World 5's Futsal 2008 ====
See details

=== Beach soccer team ===
==== AFC Beach Soccer Championship 2008 ====
Group stage

- China 4–3 Uzbekistan
- UAE 5–0 China

Semi-final

- Japan 7–1 China

Third place final

- Iran 4–1 China

==== Beach soccer at the 2008 Asian Beach Games ====
2008-10-19

| China | 4 – 3 (pen) (1 – 1 aet) | India |
|---|---|---|
| | (Report) |

Mertasari, Bali
Referee: Waleed Ali Yousef

2008-10-21

| China | 4–1 | Malaysia |
|---|---|---|
| | (Report) |

Mertasari, Bali
Referee: Kamol Maparsop

2008-10-23

| Iran | 6–3 | China |
|---|---|---|
| | (Report) |

Mertasari, Bali
Referee: Masahiro Sakurada

| Team | Pld | W | W aet/ pso | L | GF | GA | Diff | Pts |
|---|---|---|---|---|---|---|---|---|
| Iran | 3 | 3 | 0 | 0 | 19 | 8 | +11 | 9 |
| China | 3 | 1 | 1 | 1 | 8 | 8 | 0 | 5 |
| Malaysia | 3 | 1 | 0 | 2 | 7 | 14 | −7 | 3 |
| India | 3 | 0 | 0 | 3 | 9 | 13 | −4 | 0 |

2008-10-24

| South Korea | 5 – 4 (pen) (4 – 4 aet) | China |
|---|---|---|
| | (Report) |

Mertasari, Bali
Referee: Faisal Ahmed Sallam

=== Disability teams ===
==== Football 5-a-side at the 2008 Summer Paralympics ====
2008-09-07
11:30

| China | 3–0 | Great Britain |

Olympic Green Hockey Field

2008-09-09
13:00

| Argentina | 0–1 | China |

Olympic Green Hockey Field

2008-09-11
11:00

| China | 1–0 | South Korea |
|---|---|---|
| Li 13' (pen.) |

Olympic Green Hockey Field
Attendance: 1,995
Referee: TORINO Ricardo (ARG)

2008-09-13
9:00

| China | 1–0 | Spain |

Olympic Green Hockey Field

2008-09-15
13:00

| Brazil | 1–1 | China |

Olympic Green Hockey Field

| Team | P | W | D | L | G | GA | GD | Score |
|---|---|---|---|---|---|---|---|---|
| China (CHN) | 5 | 4 | 1 | 0 | 7 | 1 | +6 | 13 |
| Brazil (BRA) | 5 | 3 | 2 | 0 | 10 | 1 | +9 | 11 |
| Argentina (ARG) | 5 | 3 | 1 | 1 | 7 | 2 | +5 | 10 |
| Spain (ESP) | 5 | 1 | 1 | 3 | 5 | 7 | −2 | 4 |
| Great Britain (GBR) | 5 | 1 | 0 | 4 | 4 | 15 | −11 | 3 |
| South Korea (KOR) | 5 | 0 | 1 | 4 | 3 | 10 | −7 | 1 |

2008-09-17
13:30

| China | 1–2 | Brazil |
|---|---|---|
| Wang Y. 24' | (Report) | Alves 30'; Felipe 50' (pen.) |

Olympic Green Hockey Field B
Referee: Ilias Mastoras (Greece)

==== Football 7-a-side at the 2008 Summer Paralympics ====
2008-09-08
9:00

| Russia | 6–0 | China |

Olympic Green Hockey Field

2008-09-10
15:45

| Brazil | 8–0 | China |

Olympic Green Hockey Field

2008-09-12
11:15

| Netherlands | 8–1 | China |

Olympic Green Hockey Field

| Team | P | W | D | L | G | GA | GD | Score |
|---|---|---|---|---|---|---|---|---|
| Russia (RUS) | 3 | 3 | 0 | 0 | 21 | 1 | +20 | 9 |
| Brazil (BRA) | 3 | 2 | 0 | 1 | 9 | 3 | +6 | 6 |
| Netherlands (NED) | 3 | 1 | 0 | 2 | 9 | 14 | −5 | 3 |
| China (CHN) | 3 | 0 | 0 | 3 | 1 | 22 | −21 | 0 |

2008-09-14
11:30

| China | 1–4 | Ireland |

Olympic Green Hockey Field

2008-09-16
9:00

| Great Britain | 10–2 | China |
|---|---|---|
| | (Report) |

Olympic Green Hockey Field A
Attendance: 4235
Referee: Fang Aijun (China)
