= 2003 Chinese FA Cup =

2003 China Football Association Cup
CFA Cup

Tournament details
- Country: China
- Teams: 32

Final positions
- Champions: Beijing Guoan (3rd title)
- Runners-up: Dalian Shide

Tournament statistics
- Matches played: 47
- Goals scored: 175 (3.72 per match)
- Top goal scorer(s): (Ukraine) Serhiy Nahornyak (5 goals)

The Pabst Blue Ribbon 2003 China FA Cup (Chinese: 2003蓝带中国足球协会杯) was the 9th edition of Chinese FA Cup. The cup title sponsor is China Pabst Blue Ribbon.

== Results ==
=== First round ===
==== Zone A, Group 1 ====
Team	Pld	W	D	L	GF	GA	GD	Pts
Chongqing Lifan Xgjao	3	3	0	0	6	1	+5	9
Qingdao Sbright	3	2	0	1	6	4	+2	6
Gansu Nongken	3	1	0	2	1	4	-3	3
Yanbian FC	3	0	0	3	2	6	-4	0

1 March	Qingdao Sbright	3 – 2	Yanbian FC	Huangpu Stadium, Guangzhou
13:30	Petrović 26'; Yao Xia 32'; Vukoja 63'	Report	Zheng Linguo 35'; Han Songfeng 55'

1 March	Gansu Nongken	0 – 2	Chongqing Lifan Xgjao	Huangpu Stadium, Guangzhou
15:30		Report	Wei Xin 47', 67'

4 March	Qingdao Sbright	1 – 2	Chongqing Lifan Xgjao	Huangpu Stadium, Guangzhou
13:30	Petrović 37'	Report	Wang Anzhi 45'; Wang Xiang 80'

4 March	Yanbian FC	0 – 1	Gansu Nongken	Huangpu Stadium, Guangzhou
15:30		Report	Hao Long 18'

7 March	Chongqing Lifan Xgjao	2 – 0	Yanbian FC	Huangpu Stadium, Guangzhou
17:30	Wang Anzhi 58'; Kiniambi 64'	Report

7 March	Gansu Nongken	0 – 2	Qingdao Sbright	Huangpu Stadium, Guangzhou
19:30		Report	Yao Xia 47'; Gao Ming 80'

==== Zone A, Group 2 ====
Team	Pld	W	D	L	GF	GA	GD	Pts
Dalian Shide	3	2	1	0	6	1	+5	7
Changchun Yatai	3	2	0	1	5	4	+1	6
Qingdao Hailifeng	3	1	0	2	3	7	-4	3
Nanjing Yoyo	3	0	1	2	2	4	-2	1

26 February	Nanjing Yoyo	1 – 2	Changchun Yatai	Huadu Stadium, Guangzhou
13:30	Qu Bo 37'	Report	Cao Ming 10'; Du Zhenyu 31' (pen.)

26 February	Dalian Shide	3 – 1	Qingdao Hailifeng	Huadu Stadium, Guangzhou
15:30	Li Ming 60', 75'; Zou Jie 77'	Report	Luo Yi 50'

1 March	Qingdao Hailifeng	0 – 3	Changchun Yatai	Huadu Stadium, Guangzhou
13:30		Report	Xiang Fujun 7', 9'; Li Hongzheng 67'

1 March	Dalian Shide	0 – 0	Nanjing Yoyo	Huadu Stadium, Guangzhou
15:30		Report

4 March	Qingdao Hailifeng	2 – 1	Nanjing Yoyo	Huadu Stadium, Guangzhou
13:30	Zhang Hongkun 41', 64'	Report	Liu Xu'nan 11'

4 March	Changchun Yatai	0 – 3	Dalian Shide	Huadu Stadium, Guangzhou
15:30		Report	Zou Jie 11', 62'; Janković 75'

==== Zone B, Group 1 ====
Team	Pld	W	D	L	GF	GA	GD	Pts
Shanghai Shenhua SVA	3	3	0	0	4	0	+4	9
Shaanxi Guoli	3	1	1	1	3	2	+1	4
Guangdong Xiongying	3	0	2	1	1	3	-2	2
Zhejiang Sanhua Greentown	3	0	1	2	0	3	-3	1

26 February	Shaanxi Guoli	1 – 1	Guangdong Xiongying	Xingzhong Stadium, Zhongshan
17:30	Stoynev 90'	Report	Wu Wei'an 68' (pen.)

26 February	Shanghai Shenhua SVA	1 – 0	Zhejiang Sanhua Greentown	Xingzhong Stadium, Zhongshan
19:30	Qu Shengqing 88'	Report

1 March	Zhejiang Sanhua Greentown	0 – 0	Guangdong Xiongying	Xingzhong Stadium, Zhongshan
13:30		Report

1 March	Shanghai Shenhua SVA	1 – 0	Shaanxi Guoli	Xingzhong Stadium, Zhongshan
15:30	Qu Shengqing 11'	Report

4 March	Zhejiang Sanhua Greentown	0 – 2	Shaanxi Guoli	Xingzhong Stadium, Zhongshan
15:30		Report	Trenchev 56'; Stoynev 61'

4 March	Guangdong Xiongying	0 – 2	Shanghai Shenhua SVA	Xingzhong Stadium, Zhongshan
19:30		Report	Martínez 21'; Zhang Yuning 89'

==== Zone B, Group 2 ====
Team	Pld	W	D	L	GF	GA	GD	Pts
Shandong Luneng Taishan	3	2	1	0	5	1	+4	7
Yunnan Hongta	3	1	2	0	5	3	+2	5
Xiamen Hongshi	3	1	1	1	4	3	+1	4
Harbin Lange	3	0	0	3	2	9	-7	0

1 March	Yunnan Hongta	3 – 1	Harbin Lange	Zhaoqing Stadium, Zhaoqing
13:30	Canobbio 45'; Schumacher 66', 75'	Report	Wang Yunpeng 90+1' (pen.)

1 March	Shandong Luneng Taishan	1 – 0	Xiamen Hongshi	Zhaoqing Stadium, Zhaoqing
15:30	Nahornyak 49'	Report

4 March	Yunnan Hongta	2 – 2	Xiamen Hongshi	Zhaoqing Stadium, Zhaoqing
13:30	Sun Zhi 17'; Schumacher 49'	Report	Wu Yongjun 56'; Zhang Jun 85'

4 March	Harbin Lange	1 – 4	Shandong Luneng Taishan	Zhaoqing Stadium, Zhaoqing
15:30	Zhu Yi 48'	Report	Gao Yao 13'; Nahornyak 75'; Shu Chang 78'; Cha Kejun 82'

7 March	Xiamen Hongshi	2 – 0	Harbin Lange	Zhaoqing Stadium, Zhaoqing
13:30	Wu Kunsheng 55', 90'	Report

7 March	Shandong Luneng Taishan	0 – 0	Yunnan Hongta	Zhaoqing Stadium, Zhaoqing
15:30		Report

==== Zone C, Group 1 ====
Team	Pld	W	D	L	GF	GA	GD	Pts
Bayi Xiangtan	3	2	1	0	8	3	+5	7
Wuhan Guoce Bluestar	3	1	2	0	7	5	+2	5
Sichuan Dahe	3	1	1	1	4	5	-1	4
Dalian Sundy	3	0	0	3	3	9	-6	0

2 March	Bayi Xiangtan	3 – 0	Dalian Sundy	Ying Tung Stadium, Guangzhou
13:30	Huang Yong 28'; Sun Xinbo 31'; Ma Cheng 70'	Report

2 March	Wuhan Guoce Bluestar	1 – 1	Sichuan Dahe	Ying Tung Stadium, Guangzhou
15:30	Liu Lin 65'	Report	Ma Mingyu 38'

5 March	Bayi Xiangtan	3 – 1	Sichuan Dahe	Ying Tung Stadium, Guangzhou
13:30	Huang Yong 18'; Ma Cheng 50', 85'	Report	Pantelić 49'

5 March	Dalian Sundy	2 – 4	Wuhan Guoce Bluestar	Ying Tung Stadium, Guangzhou
15:30	Liu Yongbo 2'; Sun Fenghao 67'	Report	Li Hao 9', 41'; Wang Xiaoshi 14'; Zhang Bin 25'

8 March	Sichuan Dahe	2 – 1	Dalian Sundy	Ying Tung Stadium, Guangzhou
13:30	Yang Pengfeng 25'; Pantelić 90'	Report	Kong Xiangdong 49'

8 March	Wuhan Guoce Bluestar	2 – 2	Bayi Xiangtan	Ying Tung Stadium, Guangzhou
15:30	Janilson ?'; Wang Xiaoshi 90'	Report	Sui Dongliang 16', 38'

==== Zone C, Group 2 ====
Team	Pld	W	D	L	GF	GA	GD	Pts
Beijing Guoan	3	3	0	0	10	2	+8	9
Shanghai COSCO Huili	3	2	0	1	3	4	-1	6
Zhuhai Anping	3	0	1	2	1	4	-3	1
Guangzhou Xiangxue	3	0	1	2	2	6	-4	1

2 March	Shanghai COSCO Huili	1 – 0	Guangzhou Xiangxue	Guangdong Provincial People's Stadium, Guangzhou
17:30	Qi Hong 46'	Report

2 March	Beijing Guoan	2 – 0	Zhuhai Anping	Guangdong Provincial People's Stadium, Guangzhou
19:30	Marcus 61'; Xu Yunlong 69'	Report

5 March	Shanghai COSCO Huili	2 – 1	Zhuhai Anping	Guangdong Provincial People's Stadium, Guangzhou
17:30	Li Yan 51'; Qi Hong 76'	Report	Zhao Zhipeng 16' (pen.)

5 March	Guangzhou Xiangxue	2 – 5	Beijing Guoan	Guangdong Provincial People's Stadium, Guangzhou
19:30	Wen Xiaoming 54'; Li Zifei 59'	Report	Li Zhihai 38' (o.g.); Yang Pu 53', 79'; Reginaldo 82'; Xu Yunlong 87'

8 March	Zhuhai Anping	0 – 0	Guangzhou Xiangxue	Guangdong Provincial People's Stadium, Guangzhou
13:30		Report

8 March	Beijing Guoan	3 – 0	Shanghai COSCO Huili	Guangdong Provincial People's Stadium, Guangzhou
15:30	Du Wenhui 8', 67'; Tian Ye 19'	Report

==== Zone D, Group 1 ====
Team	Pld	W	D	L	GF	GA	GD	Pts
Liaoning Bird	3	2	1	0	10	1	+9	7
Shenyang Ginde	3	2	1	0	4	1	+3	7
Chengdu Taihe	3	1	0	2	2	6	-4	3
Xi'an Anxinyuan	3	0	0	3	1	9	-8	0

2 March	Liaoning Bird	5 – 0	Xi'an Anxinyuan	Foshan Stadium, Foshan
17:30	Li Jinyu 15', 72' (pen.); Wang Xinxin 41'; Zhao Junzhe 55' (pen.), 90'	Report

2 March	Chengdu Taihe	0 – 1	Shenyang Ginde	Foshan Stadium, Foshan
19:30		Report	Chen Tao 25'

5 March	Liaoning Bird	1 – 1	Shenyang Ginde	Foshan Stadium, Foshan
17:30	Liu Bin 30'	Report	Ayew 34'

5 March	Xi'an Anxinyuan	1 – 2	Chengdu Taihe	Foshan Stadium, Foshan
19:30	Liu Yinan 77'	Report	Wang Yi 32'; Zhang Zhenjie 46'

8 March	Shenyang Ginde	2 – 0	Xi'an Anxinyuan	Foshan Stadium, Foshan
17:30	Hu Yunfeng 35'; Yin Liangyi 80'	Report

8 March	Chengdu Taihe	0 – 4	Liaoning Bird	Foshan Stadium, Foshan
19:30		Report	Zhao Junzhe ?'; Chen Yang ?', ?'; Tuomela ?'

==== Zone D, Group 2 ====
Team	Pld	W	D	L	GF	GA	GD	Pts
Tianjin Master Kong	3	2	1	0	8	3	+5	7
Henan Construction	3	1	1	1	4	6	-2	4
Jiangsu Sainty	3	1	0	2	6	8	-2	3
Shenzhen Jianlibao	3	0	2	1	2	3	-1	2

1 March	Shenzhen Jianlibao	0 – 0	Tianjin Master Kong	Shenzhen Stadium, Shenzhen
15:30		Report

2 March	Jiangsu Sainty	1 – 3	Henan Construction	Sanshui People's Stadium, Foshan
15:30	Yin Youyou 8'	Report	Liu Xiang 40'; Su Bin 65'; Yang Jie 75'

5 March	Tianjin Master Kong	4 – 3	Jiangsu Sainty	Sanshui People's Stadium, Foshan
13:30	Sun Jianjun 24' (pen.), 90+1' (pen.); Lu Xin 62'; Lu Yan 70'	Report	Yin Youyou 8'; Mushangazhike 41'; Lu Yiliang 45+1'

5 March	Henan Construction	1 – 1	Shenzhen Jianlibao	Sanshui People's Stadium, Foshan
15:30	Xue Fei 90'	Report	Li Yi 42'

8 March	Tianjin Master Kong	4 – 0	Henan Construction	Sanshui People's Stadium, Foshan
13:30	Kerekes 26'; Yu Genwei 30'; Zhang Shuo 65'; Lu Yan 71'	Report

8 March	Shenzhen Jianlibao	1 – 2	Jiangsu Sainty	Sanshui People's Stadium, Foshan
15:30	Zheng Bin 2'	Report	Bian Jun 81'; Ye Wei 90'

=== Second round ===
All matches were postponed from 1–2 May to 16–17 August due to SARS outbreak in China.

16 August	Chongqing Lifan Xgjao	2 – 1	Changchun Yatai	Huludao Stadium, Huludao
15:30	Wang Kai 15', 35'	Report	Šabić 53' (pen.)

16 August	Yunnan Hongta	2 – 1	Shanghai Shenhua SVA	Panjin Stadium, Panjin
15:30	Canobbio 38'; Sun Zhi 71'	Report	Wang Ke 4'

16 August	Beijing Hyundai	2 – 0	Wuhan Guoce Bluestar	Daqing Stadium, Daqing
19:00	André 13'; Xu Yunlong 71'	Report

16 August	Henan Construction	1 – 0	Liaoning Zhongshun	Leifeng Stadium, Fushun
19:30	Liu Xiang 61'	Report

17 August	Dalian Shide	2 – 2 (a.e.t.) (3 - 2 p)	Qingdao Sbright	Huludao Stadium, Huludao
15:30	Zhu Ting 52'; Zou Jie 54'	Report	Bai Yi 7'; André 63'
	Penalties
	Bajčetić (penalty scored); Wang Peng (penalty missed); Dong Fangzhuo (penalty scored); Quan Lei (penalty scored); Li Yao (penalty missed)		(penalty missed) André; (penalty missed) Liang Ming; (penalty scored) Yao Xia; (penalty scored) Yao Li; (penalty missed) Petrović

17 August	Bayi Xiangtan	1 – 2	Shanghai COSCO Huili	Harbin Institute of Technology Stadium, Harbin
15:30	Li Kun 9'	Report	Zé Alcino 1' (pen.); Li Ming 79'

17 August	Shaanxi Guoli	0 – 6	Shandong Luneng Taishan	Daqing Stadium, Daqing
19:00		Report	Ouédec 4', 7'; Nahornyak 31' (pen.), ?'; Kiriakov 33', ?'

17 August	Shenyang Ginde	3 – 1	Tianjin Master Kong	Wulihe Stadium, Shenyang
19:00	Hu Yunfeng 15'; Du Ping 76'; Ayew 87'	Report	Chen Licheng 74'

=== Third round ===
27 September	Chongqing Lifan Xgjao	1 – 1 (a.e.t.) (5 - 3 p)	Shandong Luneng Taishan	Qiqihar Stadium, Qiqihar
14:00	Hajji 88'	Report	Nahornyak 33'
	Penalties
	Li Guoxu (penalty scored); Elizeu (penalty scored); Xie Hui (penalty scored); Hajji (penalty scored); Zhang Yuanjie (penalty scored)		(penalty scored) (penalty scored); (penalty missed) Zhou Haibin (penalty scored)

27 September	Dalian Shide	2 – 0	Yunnan Hongta	Jinzhou City Stadium, Jinzhou
14:30	Janković 8'; Šiljak 70'	Report

27 September	Beijing Hyundai	2 – 1	Henan Construction	Hedong Sports Centre, Tianjin
14:30	Gao Leilei 62'; André 77'	Report	Rudnei 84'

27 September	Shanghai COSCO Huili	0 – 3	Shenyang Ginde	Anshan Stadium, Anshan
18:30		Report	Yu Bo 6'; Ratinho 16'; Hu Yunfeng 67'

=== Semi-finals ===
29 September	Chongqing Lifan Xgjao	0 – 1	Dalian Shide	Huludao Stadium, Huludao
14:30		Report	Šiljak 12'

29 September	Shenyang Ginde	2 – 3 (a.e.t.)	Beijing Hyundai	Anshan Stadium, Anshan
18:30	Ekong 2'; Ayew 90+4' (pen.)	Report	Gao Leilei 38'; Yang Hao 85', 94'

=== Final ===
1 October
13:30

Dalian Shide	0 – 3	Beijing Hyundai
	Report	Kenesei 45', 85'; Yang Hao 73'

Wulihe Stadium, Shenyang
Referee: Huang Junjie

Dalian	Beijing

Dalian:
GK	23	(China) An Qi
RB	5	(China) Zhang Yaokun
CB	2	(China) Zhang Enhua (c)
CB	16	(China) Ji Mingyi
LB	3	(Brazil) Adilson
DM	14	(China) Hu Zhaojun
RM	21	(China) Li Yao
LM	11	(China) Yan Song
AM	8	(China) Wang Peng	(substituted off) 59'
FW	9	(China) Hao Haidong	(substituted off) 59'
FW	10	(Bulgaria) Zoran Janković
Substitutes used:
DF	12	(China) Wang Sheng	(substituted on) 59'
FW	18	(Slovenia) Ermin Šiljak	(substituted on) 59'
Coach:
(Serbia and Montenegro) Milorad Kosanović

Beijing:
GK	22	(China) Yao Jian
RB	37	(China) Qiu Zhonghui	(yellow card) 53'
CB	3	(China) Xie Zhaoyang
CB	12	(China) Cui Wei
LB	15	(China) Tao Wei
DM	7	(China) Li Dongbo
DM	35	(Brazil) Henrique	(yellow card) 71'	(substituted off) 90+1'
RM	28	(China) Zhou Ning (c)
LM	8	(China) Yang Pu
AM	18	(China) Lu Jiang		(substituted off) 64'
FW	38	(Hungary) Krisztián Kenesei		(substituted off) 90'
Substitutes used:
DF	4	(China) Han Xu		(substituted on) 90+1'
MF	20	(China) Yang Hao		(substituted on) 64'
FW	11	(Brazil) André		(substituted on) 90'
Coach:
(Serbia and Montenegro) Ljupko Petrović
