= 2003 Chinese Football Super Cup =

Shanghai Shenhua	Beijing Hyundai
3	4
- Date: 18 January 2004
- Venue: Olympic Park Stadium, Wuhu
- Referee: Zhou Weixin

The 2003 Chinese Football Super Cup (Chinese: 2003中国足球超霸杯) was the 9th edition of the Chinese Football Super Cup, an annual football match contested by the winners of the previous season's Super League and FA Cup competitions. The match took place at the Wuhu Olympic Park Stadium on 18 January 2004, and featured league champions Shanghai Shenhua and cup winners Beijing Hyundai. Beijing Hyundai claimed the title with a 4–3 victory.

== Match details ==
18 January 2004
15:30 CEST

Shanghai Shenhua	3–4	Beijing Hyundai
Zhang Yuning 7'; Zheng Kewei 56'; Albertz 67' (pen.)	Report	Kenesei 26', 64' (pen.); Xu Yunlong 51'; Yang Hao 72'

Olympic Park Stadium, Wuhu
Referee: Zhou Weixin (Guangzhou)

Shanghai Shenhua	Beijing Hyundai

Shanghai Shenhua:
GK	1	(China) Yu Weiliang (c)
DF	2	(China) Chen Gang	(yellow card) 77'
DF	19	(China) Li Chengming
DF	21	(China) Feng Qi		(substituted off) 78'
DF	37	(China) Yang Guang	(yellow card) 20'	(substituted off) 82'
MF	29	(China) Yao Lijun
MF	18	(China) Zheng Kewei
MF	6	(Germany) Jörg Albertz
MF	11	(Serbia and Montenegro) Dejan Petković
FW	10	(China) Zhang Yuning
FW	8	(China) Qu Shengqing	(yellow card) 82'
Substitutes used:
DF	7	(China) Bian Jun		(substituted on) 78'
FW	38	(China) Sun Wei		(substituted on) 82'
Manager:
(China) Mao Yijun

Beijing Hyundai:
GK	22	(China) Yao Jian (c)
DF	8	(China) Yang Pu
DF	12	(China) Cui Wei	(yellow card) 82'
DF	13	(China) Xu Yunlong
DF	37	(China) Qiu Zhonghui
MF	15	(China) Tao Wei
MF	20	(China) Yang Hao
MF	21	(China) Gao Leilei		(substituted off) 90+3'
MF	29	(China) Nan Fang		(substituted off) 69'
FW	17	(China) Gao Dawei
FW	38	(Hungary) Krisztián Kenesei
Substitutes used:
FW	28	(China) Zhou Ning		(substituted on) 69'
MF	4	(China) Han Xu		(substituted on) 90+3'
Manager:
(China) Wei Kexing

Chinese Football Super Cup
2003 Winners
Beijing Hyundai
Second title

== See also ==
- Chinese Jia-A League 2003
- 2003 Chinese FA Cup
