= Hao Wei =

Chinese footballer (born 1976)

Hao Wei 郝伟
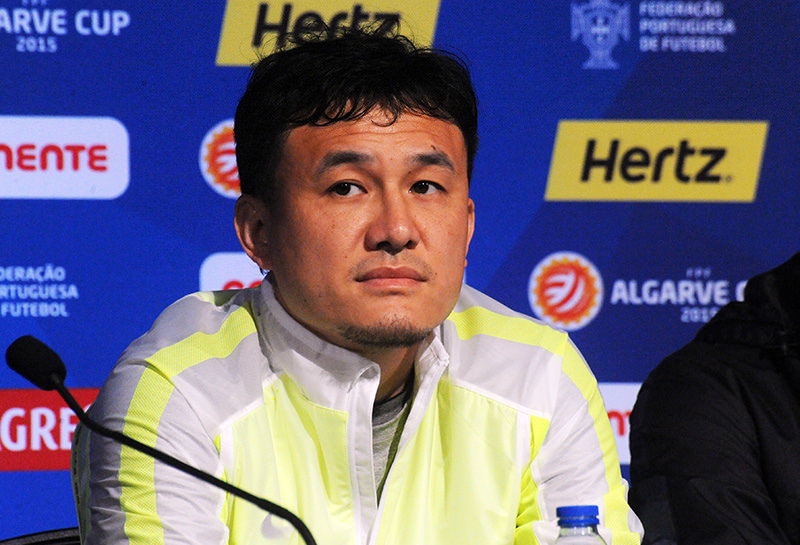
- Hao at the 2015 Algarve Cup

Personal information
- Full name: Hao Wei
- Date of birth: 27 December 1976 (age 49)
- Place of birth: Zibo, Shandong, China
- Position: Defender

Youth career
- 1993–1998: Jianlibao Youth

Senior career*
Years	Team	Apps	(Gls)
1998–2002	Shandong Luneng Taishan	58	(1)
2003	Shanxi Guoli	27	(0)
2004–2005	Beijing Guoan	22	(0)
2006–2007	Changsha Ginde	4	(0)

International career
2000–2004	China	5	(0)

Managerial career
- 2007–2009: Changsha Ginde (assistant)
- 2009–2010: Changsha Ginde
- 2010: Changsha Ginde (assistant)
- 2011: China Women (assistant)
- 2012–2015: China Women
- 2015–2016: Guangzhou Evergrande (assistant)
- 2017–2020: Shandong Luneng Taishan (assistant)
- 2019–2020: China U-23 (caretaker)
- 2020–2023: Shandong Taishan
- * Club domestic league appearances and goals

Hao Wei
- Traditional Chinese: 郝偉
- Simplified Chinese: 郝伟
Transcriptions
Standard Mandarin
- Hanyu Pinyin: Hǎo Wěi
- IPA: [xàʊ wèɪ]

Hao Wei (Chinese: 郝伟; pinyin: Hǎo Wěi; Mandarin pronunciation: [xàʊ wèɪ]; born 27 December 1976) is a Chinese football coach and former footballer.

== Playing career ==
=== Club career ===
As with many of the most promising youth players from China, Hao Wei was sent to Brazil for a training programme sponsored by Jianlibao in 1997 with fellow youth prospects Li Tie and Zhang Xiaorui. When he returned to start his professional football career he would join Shandong Luneng in 1998, however he found it difficult to immediately break into the team due to injury, though he was able to play in 11 league games and score 1 goal. It was not until the 1999 league season that Hao Wei would rise to prominence when he established himself as Shandong's first choice right back and help them to a league and cup double. His importance to the Shandong team would quickly fade when new manager Valeri Nepomniachi preferred the emerging Jiao Zhe as his first choice right back and by the end of the 2002 league season Hao Wei was allowed to leave.

Hao Wei would join Shanxi Guoli at the beginning of the 2003 league season where despite being an immediate regular for the team he was unable to help them in their relegation battle to remain in the top tier. Unable to hold on to Hao Wei, Shanxi Guoli would allow him to leave the club for Beijing Guoan at the beginning of the 2004 league season where he would fight for the right back position with Zhang Shuai for the next two seasons before going to Changsha Ginde where he ended his playing career.

=== International career ===
Hao Wei would make his senior debut in a friendly against Hong Kong on 25 April 2000 in a 1–0 win. He would play in another friendly in preparation for the 2000 AFC Asian Cup, however when the squad was chosen for the tournament he was unable to be included. With the emergence of Xu Yunlong and Sun Jihai as the preferred options at right back Hao Wei saw his playing time severely limited. He was brought in to play a Fifa World Cup Qualifier on 8 September 2004 against Malaysia in a 1–0 win, however this was to prove to be his last game.

== Management career ==
After he retired his playing career with Changsha Ginde he would take an assistant management position with them. This was a position he held on to until 12 October 2009, when the Changsha Ginde head coach Zhu Bo was sacked and he was named as the new head coach to replace him. Under his reign he would guide the club from away relegation, however the following season he was unable to improve the teams' performances and on 16 June 2010, Hao became the assistant coach to Serbian manager Miodrag Ješić. Hao would soon leave Changsha to take up a position within the Chinese Women team, however when they were unable to qualify for the Football at the 2012 Summer Olympics and the manager Li Xiaopeng resigned, which saw Hao promoted. Hao was banned from the national team's round of 16 match at the 2015 FIFA Women's World Cup because he interfered with a New Zealand player during his team's last group stage match.

On 29 January 2026, Hao was given a lifetime ban for match-fixing by the Chinese Football Association.

== Honours ==
=== Player ===
Shandong Luneng

- Chinese Jia-A League: 1999
- Chinese FA Cup: 1999

=== Manager ===
Shandong Taishan

- Chinese Super League: 2021
- Chinese FA Cup: 2020, 2021, 2022
