= Rudinei =

Brazilian footballer

Personal information
- Full name: Rudinei Amâncio
- Date of birth: 5 March 1975 (age 51)
- Place of birth: Joinville, Brazil
- Height: 1.80 m (5 ft 11 in)
- Position: Forward

Youth career
- 1991–1993: Joinville

Senior career*
Years	Team	Apps	(Gls)
1993	Joinville	1	(0)
1994–1997	Athletico Paranaense		
1995	→ Criciúma (loan)	51	(8)
1997	Brasil de Farroupilha		
1998–2003	Shaanxi Guoli		
2002	→ Henan Construction (loan)		
- * Club domestic league appearances and goals

Rudinei Amâncio (born 5 March 1975) is a former Brazilian footballer. He played professionally in both Brazil and China, most notably for Criciúma in 1995.

== Career statistics ==
=== Club ===
Club	Season	League			State League		Cup		Continental		Other		Total	
Club	Season	Division	Apps	Goals	Apps	Goals	Apps	Goals	Apps	Goals	Apps	Goals	Apps	Goals
Joinville	1993	–			1 (Note: Appearances in the Campeonato Catarinense)	0	0	0	0	0	0	0	1	0
Criciúma (loan)	1995	Série A	11	0	40	8	0	0	2 (Note: Appearances in the Copa Mercosur)	0	4 (Note: Appearances in the Copa Santa Catarina)	0	57	8
Athletico Paranaense	1997	Série A	8	1	0	0	0	0	0	0	0	0	8	1
Career total			19	1	0	0	0	0	0	0	0	0	19	1
