= Feng Qi =

Chinese footballer

Feng Qi 冯祺
Personal information
- Date of birth: August 13, 1981 (age 45)
- Place of birth: Shanghai, China
- Height: 1.83 m (6 ft 0 in)
- Position: Defender

Senior career*
Years	Team	Apps	(Gls)
2002–2005	Shanghai Shenhua	8	(0)
2006	Shanghai United F.C.	0	(0)
2007–2010	Shanghai Shenhua	7	(0)
- * Club domestic league appearances and goals as of 14 September 2010

Feng Qi (simplified Chinese: 冯祺; traditional Chinese: 馮祺; pinyin: Féng Qí) (born August 13, 1981 in Shanghai) is a former Chinese football player who spent the majority of his career playing for Shanghai Shenhua as a defender.

== Club career ==
Feng Qi began his professional football career at Shanghai Shenhua after graduating from their youth team during the 2002 league season. While he stayed with Shanghai Shenhua for several seasons he was unable to overtake Sun Ji as the first choice right-back within the team and only made eight league appearances for them, however despite his limited playing time he was still able to win the 2003 league title with the club. Unfortunately in 2013 the Chinese Football Association would revoke the league title after it was discovered the Shenhua General manager Lou Shifang had bribed officials to be bias to Shenhua in games that season. By the 2006 Chinese Super League season he would move to Shanghai United F.C. and help them come 7th within the league.

At the beginning of the 2007 Chinese Super League football league season Shanghai United F.C. and Shanghai Shenhua merged, with Shanghai Shenhua keeping their name. Feng Qi struggled to be included in the Shanghai Shenhua team and spent the entire 2007 and 2008 league seasons not included in the squad. It was only once the squad was significantly reduced by the 2009 league that saw Feng Qi return to the senior team when he played his first game in several seasons against Shenzhen Asia Travel F.C. on April 17, 2009 in a 4-1 win. His return to the first team did not last long and at the beginning of the 2010 league season he was dropped to second team before he left the club.

== Honours ==
Shanghai Shenhua

- Chinese Jia-A League: 2003 (revoked due to match-fixing scandal)
