= Zheng Kewei =

Chinese footballer (born 1980)

Zheng Kewei 郑科伟
Personal information
- Full name: Zheng Kewei
- Date of birth: 21 January 1980 (age 46)
- Place of birth: Shanghai, China
- Height: 1.86 m (6 ft 1 in)
- Position: Midfielder

Team information
- Current team: Shanghai Shenhua（assistant coach）

Youth career
- 1999–2000: Shanghai Shenhua

Senior career*
Years	Team	Apps	(Gls)
2000–2008	Shanghai Shenhua	135	(1)
2009–2010	→ Nanchang Bayi (loan)	43	(3)
2011–2012	Hangzhou Greentown	35	(0)

Managerial career
- 2023–: Shanghai Shenhua（assistant）
- * Club domestic league appearances and goals as of 5 November 2012

Zheng Kewei (simplified Chinese: 郑科伟; traditional Chinese: 鄭科偉; pinyin: Zhèng Kēwěi; born January 21, 1980, in Zhabei, Shanghai) is a Chinese football coach and former footballer who played as a midfielder.

== Club career ==
Zheng Kewei started his career playing for Shanghai Shenhua in the 2000 league season, where despite having already established Chinese internationals Shen Si and Qi Hong in front of him in midfield, Zheng would soon go on to establish himself as the club's first choice midfielder by the end of the 2001 league season. During his time with the club, he won the last Chinese Jia-A League league title in 2003 before it was renamed as the Chinese Super League. Unfortunately in 2013 the Chinese Football Association would revoke the league title after it was discovered the Shenhua General manager Lou Shifang had bribed officials to be bias to Shenhua in games that season. After years of loyal service, which saw the club just miss out on another league title the club would merge with local rivals Shanghai United and with the significantly large squad Zheng was allowed to be loaned out.

At the beginning of the 2009 league season, Shanghai Shenhua announced Zheng would officially join second-tier club Nanchang Bayi on a one-year loan deal. The move would be a big success and Zheng would play a vital part in the team's promotion to the top tier in his first season. After his successful season with Nanchang he would have his loan extended for another year and help guide the club avoid relegation. With his loan finished and his contract with Shenhua ended Zheng would move on a free transfer to Hangzhou Greentown where he was reunited with his former manager at Shenhua, Wu Jingui.

== Club career stats ==
Correct as of 1 Jan 2012

Season	Team	Country	Division	Apps	Goals
2000	Shanghai Shenhua	China	1	5	0
2001	Shanghai Shenhua	China	1	22	0
2002	Shanghai Shenhua	China	1	20	0
2003	Shanghai Shenhua	China	1	19	0
2004	Shanghai Shenhua	China	1	15	0
2005	Shanghai Shenhua	China	1	11	0
2006	Shanghai Shenhua	China	1	24	1
2007	Shanghai Shenhua	China	1	9	0
2008	Shanghai Shenhua	China	1	10	0
2009	Nanchang Bayi	China	2	23	2
2010	Nanchang Bayi	China	1	20	1
2011	Hangzhou Greentown	China	1	18	0
2012	Hangzhou Greentown	China	1	17	0

== Honours ==
Shanghai Shenhua

- Chinese Jia-A League: 2003 (revoked due to match-fixing scandal)
