= Zhu Ting (footballer) =

Chinese footballer

Zhu Ting 朱挺
Personal information
- Full name: Zhu Ting
- Date of birth: 15 July 1985 (age 41)
- Place of birth: Dalian, Liaoning, China
- Height: 1.78 m (5 ft 10 in)
- Positions: Right-back; right winger; forward

Senior career*
Years	Team	Apps	(Gls)
2002–2012	Dalian Shide	171	(26)
2004	→ Dalian Changbo (loan)	17	(1)
2013–2014	Wuhan Zall	48	(6)
2015–2020	Dalian Yifang	122	(2)
2021	Qingdao FC	14	(0)
2022–2023	Dalian Pro	37	(1)
2025	Dalian Kewei		
Total		409	(36)

International career
2006–2012	China	22	(3)

Managerial career
- 2025: Dalian Kewei
- 2025: China Women U17 (trainer)
- 2026–: Dalian K'un City (fitness)
Medal record
Representing China
Men's football
EAFF Championship
Bronze medal – third place	2008 China	Team
East Asian Games
Gold medal – first place	2001 Macau	Football
AFC Youth Championship
Silver medal – second place	2004 َ Malaysia	Team
- * Club domestic league appearances and goals

Zhu Ting (Chinese: 朱挺; pinyin: Zhū Tǐng; born 15 July 1985) is a Chinese former professional footballer who played as a right-back, a right winger or a forward.

== Club career ==
Starting his football career with Dalian Shide in 2002, Zhu Ting was unable to play in any league games and he was given the chance to start his professional career with second tier side Dalian Changbo on a loan move in 2004 where in his first season he played seventeen games and scored one goal. Moving back to Dalian the following season, he was given the chance to prove himself by then manager Vladimir Petrović and despite only playing in a handful of games he would still be part of the squad that won the league and cup double at the end of the season.

The next season saw him go on to establish himself as the team's regular striker, however despite not being a prolific scorer, he won praise for his speed, determination and high work rate until the end of the 2008 league season when Dalian struggled within the league and there were question marks with his future even in July 2009, Dalian was rumoured to have accepted a deal from Prva HNL side Hajduk Split to loan Zhu for a fee of €120,000 with a view for a permanent deal in the future. The deal never materialized and Zhu had to fight for his place within the squad once again.

After failing to establish himself as a striker in the club, Zhu made a position transition to right winger and later to right-back by manager Nelo Vingada during the 2011 league season. He had an outstanding performances in the new position and eventually returned to the Chinese national team as defender in August 2012. Zhu transferred to promoted Chinese Super League side Wuhan Zall after Shide was dissolved at the end of the 2012 season.

On 12 February 2015, Zhu transferred to China League One side Dalian Aerbin (later renamed Dalian Pro). He immediately established himself as a vital member of their team that eventually went on to win the division title and promotion to the top tier at the end of the 2017 China League One campaign. The following campaign he was able to help ensure the club remained within the league. By the 2020 league campaign, the introduction of Tong Lei saw Zhu excluded from the first team squad of Dalian Professional.

He left the team in 2021, to join fellow top-tier club Qingdao FC. While he established himself as a vital member of their team, he would be part of the squad that was relegated at the end of the 2021 Chinese Super League season. The relegation would see the club dissolved and Zhu would return to his former club Dalian Pro.

On 18 January 2024, Zhu announced his retirement from professional football, a day after the dissolution of his club Dalian Professional.

== Coaching career ==
On 11 January 2026, Zhu was named as the fitness coach of China League One club Dalian K'un City.

== International career ==
Zhu made his international debut on 11 October 2006 in a 2007 AFC Asian Cup qualification game against Palestine in a 2–0 victory and would soon be included into the Chinese squad for the 2007 AFC Asian Cup. He was eligible to play for the 2008 Summer Olympics squad where he started the final group game of the tournament. He returned to the national team in 2008 when he participated in several matches during 2010 FIFA World Cup qualification.

== Career statistics ==
Appearances and goals by club, season and competition
Club	Season	League			National Cup		League Cup		Continental		Other		Total	
Club	Season	Division	Apps	Goals	Apps	Goals	Apps	Goals	Apps	Goals	Apps	Goals	Apps	Goals
Dalian Shide	2002	Chinese Jia-A League	0	0	0	0	-		0	0	-		0	0
Dalian Shide	2003	Chinese Jia-A League	0	0	1	1	-		-		-		1	1
Dalian Shide	Total		0	0	1	1	0	0	0	0	0	0	1	1
Dalian Changbo	2004	China League One	17	1	1	1	-		-		-		18	2
Dalian Shide	2005	Chinese Super League	9	0	6	2	0	0	-		-		15	2
Dalian Shide	2006	Chinese Super League	18	8	6	2	-		2	0	3 (Note: Appearances in A3 Champions Cup)	1	29	11
Dalian Shide	2007	Chinese Super League	23	4	-		-		-		-		23	4
Dalian Shide	2008	Chinese Super League	23	3	-		-		-		-		23	3
Dalian Shide	2009	Chinese Super League	21	4	-		-		-		-		21	4
Dalian Shide	2010	Chinese Super League	28	4	-		-		-		-		28	4
Dalian Shide	2011	Chinese Super League	27	1	1	0	-		-		-		28	1
Dalian Shide	2012	Chinese Super League	22	2	1	0	-		-		-		23	2
Dalian Shide	Total		171	26	14	4	0	0	2	0	3	1	190	31
Wuhan Zall	2013	Chinese Super League	22	4	1	0	-		-		-		23	4
Wuhan Zall	2014	China League One	26	2	0	0	-		-		-		26	2
Wuhan Zall	Total		48	6	1	0	0	0	0	0	0	0	49	6
Dalian Yifang / Dalian Professional	2015	China League One	27	0	1	0	-		-		-		28	0
Dalian Yifang / Dalian Professional	2016	China League One	30	1	0	0	-		-		-		30	1
Dalian Yifang / Dalian Professional	2017	China League One	23	0	0	0	-		-		-		23	0
Dalian Yifang / Dalian Professional	2018	Chinese Super League	26	1	3	1	-		-		-		29	2
Dalian Yifang / Dalian Professional	2019	Chinese Super League	16	0	3	1	-		-		-		19	1
Dalian Yifang / Dalian Professional	Total		122	2	7	2	0	0	0	0	0	0	129	4
Qingdao FC	2021	Chinese Super League	14	0	2	0	-		-		2 (Note: Appearances in Play-Offs Promotion/Relegation)	0	18	0
Dalian Professional	2022	Chinese Super League	15	1	1	0	-		-		-		16	1
Dalian Professional	2023	Chinese Super League	22	0	3	0	-		-		-		25	0
Dalian Professional	Total		37	1	4	0	0	0	0	0	0	0	41	1
Career Total			409	36	30	8	0	0	2	0	5	1	446	45

=== International goals ===
Scores and results list China's goal tally first.

No.	Date	Venue	Opponent	Score	Result	Competition
1.	27 January 2008	Tianhe Stadium, Guangzhou, China	Syria	2–1	2–1	Friendly
2.	23 February 2008	Chongqing Olympic Sports Center, Chongqing, China	North Korea	1–1	3–1	2008 East Asian Football Championship
3.	15 March 2008	Kunming Tuodong Sports Center, Kunming, China	Thailand	3–3	3–3	Friendly

== Honours ==
=== Club ===
Dalian Shide

- Chinese Super League: 2005.
- Chinese FA Cup: 2005.

Dalian Professional

- China League One: 2017.
