= Yu Weiliang =

Chinese association football player

Personal information
- Date of birth: 17 September 1973 (age 53)
- Place of birth: Shanghai, China
- Height: 1.88 m (6 ft 2 in)
- Position: Goalkeeper

Youth career
- 1988–1989: Shanghai Sports School
- 1990–1992: Shanghai Youth
- 1992–1994: Shanghai Reserves

Senior career*
Years	Team	Apps	(Gls)
1995–1997	Shanghai Dashun		
1998–2006	Shanghai Shenhua	151	(0)
2007	Shaanxi Baorong Chanba	1	(0)
Total		152	(0)

International career
2001–2003	China	3	(0)
- * Club domestic league appearances and goals

Yu Weiliang (Chinese: 虞伟亮; born 17 September 1973) is a former Chinese footballer who played as a goalkeeper for the China national football team.

== Career statistics ==
=== Club ===
Club	Season	League			Cup		Continental		Other		Total	
Club	Season	Division	Apps	Goals	Apps	Goals	Apps	Goals	Apps	Goals	Apps	Goals
Shanghai Shenhua	1998	Jia-A	5	0	0	0	–		0	0	5	0
Shanghai Shenhua	1999	Jia-A	0	0	0	0	–		0	0	0	0
Shanghai Shenhua	2000	Jia-A	17	0	0	0	–		0	0	17	0
Shanghai Shenhua	2001	Jia-A	24	0	0	0	–		0	0	24	0
Shanghai Shenhua	2002	Jia-A	24	0	0	0	–		0	0	24	0
Shanghai Shenhua	2003	Jia-A	28	0	0	0	–		1 (Note: Appearances in the Chinese FA Super Cup)	0	29	0
Shanghai Shenhua	2004	Chinese Super League	17	0	0	0	–		0	0	17	0
Shanghai Shenhua	2005	Chinese Super League	25	0	0	0	–		0	0	25	0
Shanghai Shenhua	2006	Chinese Super League	11	0	2 (Note: Appearances in the Chinese FA Cup)	0	2 (Note: Appearances in the AFC Champions League)	0	0	0	15	0
Shanghai Shenhua	Total		151	0	2	0	2	0	1	0	156	0
Shaanxi Baorong Chanba	2007	Chinese Super League	1	0	0	0	–		0	0	1	0
Career total			152	0	2	0	2	0	1	0	157	0

=== International ===
National team	Year	Apps	Goals
China	2001	2	0
China	2002	0	0
China	2003	1	0
Total		3	0
