= Liu Xiang (footballer) =

Chinese footballer

Personal information
- Date of birth: 1 May 1981 (age 45)
- Place of birth: Beijing, China
- Height: 1.75 m (5 ft 9 in)
- Position: Midfielder

Senior career*
Years	Team	Apps	(Gls)
2002–2010	Henan Jianye	100	(7)
2008	→ Qingdao Hailifeng (loan)	20	(0)
2010–2012	Beijing Baxy	43	(3)
2013	Meizhou Hakka		
2015	Heilongjiang Lava Spring	4	(1)
Total		167	(11)
- * Club domestic league appearances and goals

Liu Xiang (simplified Chinese: 刘翔; traditional Chinese: 劉翔; pinyin: Liú Xiáng; born 1 May 1981) is a former Chinese footballer.

== Career statistics ==
=== Club ===
Club	Season	League			Cup		Continental		Other		Total	
Club	Season	Division	Apps	Goals	Apps	Goals	Apps	Goals	Apps	Goals	Apps	Goals
Henan Jianye	2003	Chinese Jia-B League	15	0	0	0	–		0	0	15	0
Henan Jianye	2004	China League One	19	1	0	0	–		0	0	19	1
Henan Jianye	2005	China League One	20	2	0	0	–		0	0	20	2
Henan Jianye	2006	China League One	22	4	0	0	–		0	0	22	4
Henan Jianye	2007	Chinese Super League	21	0	0	0	0	0	0	0	21	0
Henan Jianye	2008	Chinese Super League	0	0	0	0	0	0	0	0	0	0
Henan Jianye	2009	Chinese Super League	3	0	0	0	0	0	0	0	3	0
Henan Jianye	2010	Chinese Super League	0	0	0	0	0	0	0	0	0	0
Henan Jianye	Total		100	7	0	0	0	0	0	0	100	7
Qingdao Hailifeng (loan)	2008	China League One	20	0	0	0	–		0	0	20	0
Beijing Baxy	2010	China League One	9	1	0	0	–		0	0	9	1
Beijing Baxy	2011	China League One	20	1	0	0	–		0	0	20	1
Beijing Baxy	2012	China League One	14	1	0	0	–		0	0	14	1
Beijing Baxy	Total		43	3	0	0	0	0	0	0	43	3
Heilongjiang Lava Spring	2015	China League Two	4	1	2 (Note: Appearances in the Chinese FA Cup)	0	–		0	0	6	1
Career total			167	11	2	0	0	0	0	0	169	11
