= China Three Gorges University =

Provincial university in Yichang, Hubei

- 三峡大学
- Motto: 求索
- Type: Public
- Established: 2000; 26 years ago
- President: Prof. Jianlin Li
- Faculty: 1,997
- Administrative staff: 2,336
- Students: 28,716
- Undergraduates: 24,000
- Postgraduates: 4,716
- Location: Yichang, Hubei, China
- Colors: Green
- Website: ctgu.edu.cn eng.ctgu.edu.cn

China Three Gorges University (CTGU; 三峡大学) is a provincial public university in Yichang, Hubei, China. It is affiliated with the Province of Hubei and sponsored by the provincial government. The university was established in 2000 by the merger of Wuhan Hydraulic and Electric Power University Yichang (武汉水利电力大学宜昌) and Hubei Sanxia College (湖北三峡学院).

The campus occupies 200 hectares, and the total building area comprises 830,000 m^{2} (8,934,046 sq ft). The libraries consist of 2,000,000 volumes.

== History ==
CTGU is a comprehensive university established on June 29, 2000, after the merger of the University of Hydraulic and Electric Engineering at Yichang, Hubei Sanxia University, and a medical college founded in 1946.

== Present ==
CTGU is famous for its influence in hydroelectric engineering and electrical engineering.

Since 2012, CTGU has recruited over 24,000 full-time undergraduates, 2,336 postgraduate and 1,048 foreign students. It institutes a group of key subjects (key laboratories) at the provincial and state level, and doctoral and master programs.
