= Osvaldo Canobbio =

Uruguayan footballer (born 1973)

Personal information
- Full name: Osvaldo Francisco Canobbio Pittaluga
- Date of birth: 17 February 1973 (age 53)
- Place of birth: Montevideo, Uruguay
- Height: 1.78 m (5 ft 10 in)
- Position: Forward

Team information
- Current team: Liverpool Montevideo (youth)

Youth career
- River Plate Montevideo

Senior career*
Years	Team	Apps	(Gls)
1988–1993	River Plate Montevideo	18	(9)
1994–1995	Nacional	61	(36)
1995–1996	Newell's Old Boys	11	(1)
1996	Nacional	5	(0)
1997–1998	Deportivo Español	51	(9)
1998–1999	Talleres	25	(1)
1999–2001	Racing Club	37	(10)
2001	Huracán	15	(1)
2002	Cobreloa	29	(14)
2003	Yunnan Hongta	25	(8)
2004–2006	River Plate Montevideo	51	(22)
2007	CD Olimpia		
2007–2008	Liverpool Montevideo	22	(6)
2008–2009	Cerro Largo	4	(0)
2009–2010	Juventud Las Piedras	4	(2)
2010	Fénix	8	(0)

International career
1993–1997	Uruguay	8	(2)

Managerial career
- 2010: Rampla Juniors (assistant)
- 2012: Fénix (assistant)
- 2013: El Tanque Sisley
- 2014–2015: Barcelona SC (assistant)
- 2015–2017: Fénix (youth)
- 2017: Villa Española
- 2018: Liverpool Montevideo (assistant)
- 2019–: Liverpool Montevideo (youth)
- 2019: Liverpool Montevideo (caretaker)
- * Club domestic league appearances and goals

Osvaldo Francisco Canobbio Pittaluga (born 17 February 1973) is a Uruguayan football manager and former player who played as a forward. He is currently the youth team coach of Liverpool Montevideo.

== Playing career ==
=== Club ===
Canobbio started his senior career in 1988 with River Plate Montevideo. They were relegated to Uruguayan Segunda División in 1990. They were promoted back to Uruguayan Primera División in 1991. The finished second in the league in 1992.

By 1994 Canobbio had joined Nacional. He then moved to Argentina in 1996 and started playing for Deportivo Español. In Argentina he also joined Talleres (in 1997) and Racing Club (in 1998) where he became the highest goalscorer of the team.

In 2002 Osvaldo moved to Chile and joined Cobreloa and participated in Copa Libertadores.

After almost fourteen years playing in South America, Osvaldo moved to China to join Yunnan Hongta, a team which used to participate in the Chinese League.

Between 2004 and 2007, Osvaldo has played for his former team River Plate. Then he played for Honduran club Olimpia. He joined Liverpool Montevideo in July 2007.

He retired after playing for Fénix in 2010.

=== International ===
Canobbio was part of Uruguay squad at 1991 FIFA World Youth Championship. He played eight matches and scored two goals for the senior team between 1993 and 1997.

== Personal life ==
Canobbio's son Agustín is a current Uruguayan international.

== Career statistics ==
=== International ===
Appearances and goals by national team and year
National team	Year	Apps	Goals
Uruguay	1993	1	0
Uruguay	1994	0	0
Uruguay	1995	6	2
Uruguay	1996	0	0
Uruguay	1997	1	0
Total		8	2

Scores and results list Uruguay's goal tally first, score column indicates score after each Canobbio goal.

List of international goals scored by Osvaldo Canobbio
No.	Date	Venue	Opponent	Score	Result	Competition
1	22 March 1995	Atanasio Girardot Sports Complex, Medellín, Colombia	Colombia	1–1	2–1	Friendly
2	25 June 1995	Estadio Parque Artigas, Paysandú, Uruguay	New Zealand	6–0	7–0	Friendly
