= Dalian Changbo F.C. =

Chinese football club

Dalian Changbo 大连长波
- Full name: Dalian Changbo F.C. 大连长波足球俱乐部
- Founded: 2001; 24 years ago
- Dissolved: 2005; 20 years ago

Dalian Changbo F.C. (Chinese: 大连长波足球俱乐部) was a football club based in Dalian, China.

== History ==
The club was founded in 2001 as Dalian Sundy and started in the third tier China League Two in 2002, where it achieved third place in its debut, narrowly missing promotion due to losing to Guangdong Xiongying in the semi-finals. In the following year, however, the club won the entire championship and gained promotion to China League One.

Upon entering professional level, due to its affiliation with Dalian Shide, the club was forcibly overtaken by Dalian FA, and changed its name to Dalian Mingzhu. However, it was taken over again by its former shareholders in May 2004, this time under the name Dalian Changbo.

After the 2005 season, the club's alleged affiliation with Dalian Shide was again under investigation, resulting in the club itself as well as its place in China League One being forced to sold to China League Two team Xizang Huitong Luhua to take over its place in the league.

== Name history ==
- 2001–2003 Dalian Sundy F.C. 大连三德
- 2004 Dalian Mingzhu F.C. 大连明珠
- 2004–2005 Dalian Changbo F.C. 大连长波

All-time League Rankings

Season	2002	2003	2004	2005
Division	3	3	2	2
Position	3	1	15	12
