= Lu Jiang =

Chinese footballer

Lu Jiang 路姜
Personal information
- Full name: Lu Jiang
- Date of birth: June 30, 1981 (age 45)
- Place of birth: Beijing, China
- Height: 1.82 m (6 ft 0 in)
- Position: Right midfielder

Youth career
- 1996–2000: Beijing Guoan

Senior career*
| Years | Team | Apps | (Gls) |
| 2000–2011 | Beijing Guoan | 124 | (5) |
| 2012 | Hunan Billows | 21 | (4) |
| 2013–2015 | Beijing Baxy | 70 | (0) |
| 2016 | Anhui Hefei Guiguan | | |

International career^{‡}
| 1999 | China U23 | | |
| 2002 | China | 1 | (0) |
- * Club domestic league appearances and goals as of 1 November 2015 ‡ National team caps and goals as of January 2012

Lu Jiang (Chinese: 路姜; pinyin: Lù Jiāng; born June 30, 1981, in Beijing) is a Chinese former football player who played as midfielder.

== Club career ==
Lu Jiang started his professional football career with Beijing Guoan in 2000 as a highly promising young midfielder who came from the club's youth team. He would progress within the team establishing himself as a squad regular until the beginning of the 2002 league season when new Beijing Guoan Head coach Ljupko Petrović promoted Lu Jiang as a first choice regular within the team. Lu Jiang would then spend several seasons as a vital member within the Beijing team, however the club were not regular title contenders and they brought in Shen Xiangfu as their new Head coach in 2005, this would however see Lu Jiang finding himself increasingly dropped from the team during the end of the season. Lu Jiang's performances saw him relegated to a squad player throughout the 2006 league season and it was only when Lee Jang-Soo came in to manage the team in 2007 was he able to get some more playing time. Under Lee Jang-Soo's reign he would become a versatile player able to play as a right back and with the sudden retirement of the team's right back Zhang Shuai at the end of the 2008 league season Lu Jiang would establish himself as a first choice regular once more within the team even after being banned for eight games after having a scuffle with Li Weifeng in a league game on September 27, 2008, against Wuhan Optics Valley. Despite Zhou Ting going on to become Beijing's first choice right back Lu Jiang would gain significant playing time and go on to win the 2009 Chinese Super League title with the club. By 2011 Lu Jiang's playing time would significantly drop at Beijing and he was allowed to leave the club to join second tier team Hunan Billows at the beginning of the 2012 league season.

== International career ==
Lu Jiang would be called into the Chinese U-21 team and would be promoted to the senior team once he established himself within the Beijing Guoan on December 7, 2002, for a friendly against Syria in a game that China won 3-1 .

== Honours ==
- Beijing Guoan F.C.
  - Chinese Super League: 2009
  - Chinese FA Cup: 2003
  - Chinese Football Super Cup: 2003
