= Tao Wei (footballer, born 1978) =

Chinese footballer

Tao Wei 陶伟
Personal information
- Date of birth: March 11, 1978 (age 48)
- Place of birth: Beijing, China
- Height: 1.76 m (5 ft 9 in)
- Position: Midfielder

Team information
- Current team: Beijing Guoan (assistant coach)

Youth career
- 1991–1995: Beijing Youth
- 1995: Beijing Victory
- 1996–1998: Jianlibao Youth

Senior career*
| Years | Team | Apps | (Gls) |
| 1998–2010 | Beijing Guoan | 270 | (41) |

International career^{‡}
| 2004–2007 | China | 14 | (1) |

Managerial career
- 2017-: Beijing Guoan (assistant)
- * Club domestic league appearances and goals as of 6 February 2010 ‡ National team caps and goals as of 6 February 2010

Tao Wei (simplified Chinese: 陶伟; traditional Chinese: 陶偉; pinyin: Táo Wěi; born March 11, 1978) is a Chinese football player who has spent his entire professional career with Beijing Guoan. A left footed central midfield player he has also represented his country at international level.

== Club career ==
A highly promising left-back Tao Wei would quickly be included in the short-lived Chinese national youth team program to study football abroad that was sponsored by Jianlibao. After spending several years studying in Russia and Brazil he would eventually graduate from the program and begin his career in 1998 when he made 8 appearances for Beijing Guoan in his debut season. The following season he would permanently appear in midfield and make a further 22 league appearances to establish himself as a regular member of the team. Since his establishment within the team he has become an integral member for Beijing Guoan where he was named as vice-captain in Beijings debut season in the 2008 AFC Champions League season. Tao Wei would lead Beijing Guoan out in their first game against Nam Dinh on March 12, 2008, due to the absence of the captain Yang Pu which Beijing won 3–1. Despite the win Beijing were unable to have a successful league or cup campaign and Wang Ke as well as Zhang Xinxin were brought in the following season to replace Tao Wei in the Beijing midfield, however while Tao Wei often spent much of his time on the bench he was able to re-establish himself within the team and help Beijing win the 2009 league title. Once he had won the league title he would be offered an assistant coach position at the club.

== International career ==
Tao Wei would have to wait until January 27, 2004, until he was included in the senior Chinese team to face Macedonia in a friendly that ended in a 0–0 draw. In preparation for the 2004 AFC Asian Cup he would play in numerous friendlies, however head coach Arie Haan preferred the potential of Zhou Haibin and the experience of Li Ming to take to the tournament. Tao Wei would have to wait until Zhu Guanghu became head coach until he was given his second chance to establish himself in the senior team and while he played a significant part in the qualification for the 2007 AFC Asian Cup even scoring his debut goal against Iraq he was not included in the squad that took part in the tournament where this time Shao Jiayi was preferred in midfield.

== Career statistics ==
=== International goals ===
Scores and results list China PR's goal tally first.

| No | Date | Venue | Opponent | Score | Result | Competition |
|---|---|---|---|---|---|---|
| 1. | 1 March 2006 | Sheikh Khalifa International Stadium, Al Ain, United Arab Emirates | Iraq | 1–1 | 1–2 | 2007 AFC Asian Cup qualification |

== Honours ==
Beijing Guoan

- Chinese Super League: 2009
- Chinese FA Cup: 2003
- Chinese Football Super Cup: 2003
