= Harbin Guoli F.C. =

Chinese football club

Harbin Guoli Hārbīn Guólì 哈尔滨国力
- Full name: Harbin Guoli
- Nickname: Northwest Wolves (西北狼）
- Founded: 1996; 30 years ago
- Dissolved: 2005; 21 years ago
- Ground: Jiaodaruisun Stadium, Shaanxi, China
- Capacity: 50,100
- League: Chinese League One
| Home colours | Away colours |

Harbin Guoli Football Club (simplified Chinese: 哈尔滨国力; traditional Chinese: 哈爾滨國力; pinyin: Hārbīn Guólì) is a defunct football club who played in Harbin, Heilongjiang and their home stadium was the 50,100 seater Jiaodaruisun Stadium. Founded on February 28, 1996, as Shaanxi National Power F.C. in Xi’an, Shaanxi, they played nine seasons in the Chinese football leagues system with three of them in the top tier where they achieved their best finish of ninth place in 2001 Chinese Jia-A League season. They were forced to withdraw from the 2005 China League One before the start of the season by the Chinese Football Association due to accumulated debts.

== Name history ==
- 1996–2004 Shaanxi National Power 陕西国力
- 2004 Ningbo National Power 宁波国力
- 2005 Harbin Guoli 哈尔滨国力

== Honours ==
- Chinese Jia B League (Second Tier League)

2000

== Results ==
All-time League rankings

- As of the end of 2005 season

| Season | 1996 | 1997 | 1998 | 1999 | 2000 | 2001 | 2002 | 2003 | 2004 |
|---|---|---|---|---|---|---|---|---|---|
| Division | 3 | 3 | 2 | 2 | 2 | 1 | 1 | 1 | 2 |
| Position | ?^{1} | 4 | 10 | 10 | 1 | 9 | 15^{2} | 15 | 12 |

- ^Note 1 : in group stage
- ^Note 2 : no relegation
