= Shang Yi =

Chinese footballer and commentator

Personal information
- Date of birth: 20 January 1979 (age 47)
- Place of birth: Tianjin, China
- Position: Midfielder

Senior career*
| Years | Team | Apps | (Gls) |
| 1999–2003 | Beijing Guoan | 66 | (3) |
| 2003–2004 | Xerez | 8 | (1) |
| 2004–2008 | Beijing Guoan | 23 | (0) |
| Total | | 97 | (4) |

International career
| 2000 | China | 2 | (0) |
- * Club domestic league appearances and goals

Shang Yi (Chinese: 商毅; born 20 January 1979) is a Chinese former footballer who played at both professional and international levels, as a midfielder. He is a commentator for Beijing TV Sports Channel.

== Playing career ==
Born in Tianjin, Shang began his career at Beijing Guoan, spending his entire career there, minus a short spell in Spain with Xerez during the 2003–04 season. While at Xerez, Shang hit the headlines after the club was paid to play him by a "personal sponsor" of the player. He is mainly remembered for scoring a goal versus Cádiz CF, fierce rivals of the club

Shang earned two caps for China in 2000.

== Later career ==
Shang became a commentator for Beijing TV Sports Channel after his retirement.

== Personal life ==
Shang Yi married table tennis player Wu Na in 2003. They have a son Shang Juncheng who is a professional tennis player.

== Honours ==
Beijing Guoan

- Chinese FA Cup: 2003
