= Li Yao (footballer) =

Chinese footballer (born 1977)

Personal information
- Date of birth: November 21, 1977 (age 48)
- Place of birth: Shenyang, Liaoning, China
- Height: 1.79 m (5 ft 10 in)
- Position: Midfielder

Senior career*
Years	Team	Apps	(Gls)
1999–2002	Liaoning FC		
2003–2005	Dalian Shide		
2006–2007	Beijing Guoan		
2007	Kitchee SC		
2008	Zhejiang Greentown		

Managerial career
- 2013: Shenyang Zhongze (assistant)
- 2016: Shijiazhuang Ever Bright (assistant)
- 2019: BSU U19
- 2020–2021: Hebei Zhuoao (assistant)
- 2025: Changchun Dazhong Zhuoyue
- 2026: Foshan Nanshi
- * Club domestic league appearances and goals

Li Yao (Chinese: 李尧; born 21 December 1977) is a Chinese football coach and former footballer who played as a midfielder.

== Career ==
Li was described as "considered the best left midfielder in China". He played for Chinese side Dalian Shide, where he was described as "already an old man in the Dalian Shide team... Li Yao was sent to the ranks of the elderly in three years. Now behind Li Ming in the Shide team is Chen Dong, behind Chen Dong is Li Yao, and behind Li Yao are a bunch of successors born after the 1980s. From the chorus of "Replace Li Yao" on the Dalian field in the 2003 season... to the so-called salary cut controversy before the 2005 season, Li Yao, a "migrant", always has stories in Dalian".

On 7 August 2026, Li was named as the head coach of China League One side Foshan Nanshi. On 24 September 2026, Li and his coaching team have left the club.

== Style of play ==
Li mainly operated as a winger and was known for his speed.
