= Wang Dong (footballer, born 1985) =

Chinese footballer

Wang Dong 王栋
Personal information
- Date of birth: June 11, 1985 (age 41)
- Place of birth: Tianjin, China
- Height: 1.79 m (5 ft 10 1/2 in)
- Position: Defender

Senior career*
Years	Team	Apps	(Gls)
2004–2009	Beijing Guoan	0	(0)
2010–2014	Shenzhen Ruby	79	(0)
- * Club domestic league appearances and goals as of 11 November 2014

Wang Dong (Chinese: 王栋; born 11 June 1985 in Tianjin) is a Chinese football player.

== Club career ==
In 2004, Wang Dong started his professional footballer career with Beijing Guoan in the Chinese Super League.

In February 2010, Wang transferred to Chinese Super League side Shenzhen Ruby. He would eventually make his league debut for Beijing on 4 April 2010 in a game against Beijing Guoan.

== Career statistics ==
Club performance			League		Cup		League Cup		Continental		Total	
Season	Club	League	Apps	Goals	Apps	Goals	Apps	Goals	Apps	Goals	Apps	Goals
China PR			League		FA Cup		CSL Cup		Asia		Total	
2004	Beijing Guoan	Chinese Super League	0	0	0	0	0	0	-		0	0
2005	Beijing Guoan	Chinese Super League	0	0	0	0	0	0	-		0	0
2006	Beijing Guoan	Chinese Super League	0	0	0	0	-		-		0	0
2007	Beijing Guoan	Chinese Super League	0	0	-		-		-		0	0
2008	Beijing Guoan	Chinese Super League	0	0	-		-		0	0	0	0
2009	Beijing Guoan	Chinese Super League	0	0	-		-		0	0	0	0
2010	Shenzhen Ruby	Chinese Super League	18	0	-		-		-		18	0
2011	Shenzhen Ruby	Chinese Super League	17	0	1	0	-		-		18	0
2012	Shenzhen Ruby	China League One	17	0	0	0	-		-		17	0
2013	Shenzhen Ruby	China League One	27	0	1	0	-		-		28	0
2014	Shenzhen Ruby	China League One	0	0	0	0	-		-		0	0
Total	China PR		79	0	2	0	0	0	0	0	81	0

Statistics accurate as of match played 11 November 2014
