= Zhang Shuai (footballer, born 1981) =

Chinese footballer

Zhang Shuai 张帅
Personal information
- Date of birth: July 20, 1981 (age 45)
- Place of birth: Qingdao, Shandong, China
- Height: 1.82 m (6 ft 0 in)
- Positions: Right-back; centre-back

Senior career*
Years	Team	Apps	(Gls)
1999–2008	Beijing Guoan	135	(3)

International career^{‡}
2007–2008	China	14	(0)
Medal record
Representing China
Men's football
EAFF Championship
Bronze medal – third place	2008 China	Team
AFC Youth Championship
Bronze medal – third place	2000 َ Iran	Team
- * Club domestic league appearances and goals as of 16 October 2012 ‡ National team caps and goals as of 16 October 2012

Zhang Shuai (Chinese: 张帅) (born July 20, 1981 in Qingdao, Shandong) is a Chinese former international football player who played his whole career with Beijing Guoan as a versatile right-back or centre-back.

== Career ==
=== Early career ===
In 1996 Zhang Shuai would leave home and move to Beijing to start his football career where he would eventually gain a place at the Beijing Guoan youth team and then eventually promotion to their senior team. After breaking into the Beijing squad he would be called up to the Chinese youth team, however his off-the field antics did not go down well with the management especially his nights out clubbing with his teammates, which saw him dropped from the team. Returning to Beijing he would go on to establish himself within the squad and by the 2003 league season he would aid the team to win the 2003 Chinese FA Cup.

After achieving success with Beijing Zhang Shuai was given a drugs test during the off season on 22 December 2003, which he failed and was given a three-month ban for testing positive for the banned substance ephedrine. He became the first Chinese player ever to be banned for using drugs in football and was personally fined an undisclosed amount. Zhang claimed his innocence by saying he accidentally took the substance for a remedy to his cold, however his apologies were not enough for the Chinese youth team and they permanently dropped him from their squad once more. Beijing Guoan stuck by him and he would surprisingly miss very little of the 2004 league season and would even go on to win the 2004 Chinese Super Cup at the end of the season.

=== Retirement ===
Zhang Shuai's career would go from strength to strength, winning his first senior international cap for China against Thailand in a friendly on May 16, 2007 in a 1–0 defeat where despite the defeat his performance was good enough for him to become a regular within the squad and go to the 2007 AFC Asian Cup. His career drastically changed when he had a terrible performance against Shanghai Shenhua in a game, which saw him make a dreadful mistake that lead to a Shanghai goal. This saw him to being forced into the reserve team and frozen out of the squad, Zhang would later announce that he decided to retire from association football because of this unfair punishment.

== Honours ==
Beijing Guoan

- Chinese FA Cup: 2003
- Chinese Football Super Cup: 2003
