= Sui Dongliang =

Chinese footballer

Sui Dongliang 隋东亮
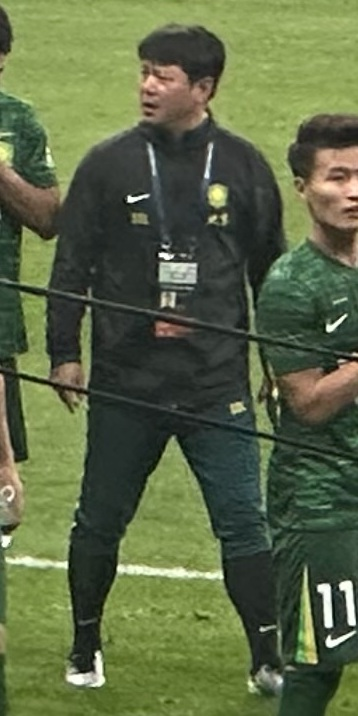
- Sui in April 2025

Personal information
- Full name: Sui Dongliang
- Date of birth: September 24, 1977 (age 49)
- Place of birth: Dalian, Liaoning, China
- Height: 1.82 m (6 ft 0 in)
- Position: Midfielder

Youth career
- 1989–1993: Bayi Football Team
- 1993–1998: Jianlibao Youth

Senior career*
Years	Team	Apps	(Gls)
2000–2003	Bayi Football Team	83	(5)
2004–2009	Beijing Guoan	101	(5)

International career
1997	China U-20		
1997–1998	China	26	(2)

Managerial career
- 2010: Beijing Guoan Talent
- 2012: Beijing Youth
- 2015–2022: Beijing Guoan (reserve and youth teams)
- 2022: Beijing Guoan (caretaker)
- 2022–: Beijing Guoan (assistant)
Medal record
Men's football
Representing China
Asian Games
Bronze medal – third place	1998 Bangkok	Football
- * Club domestic league appearances and goals as of 6 February 2010

Sui Dongliang (simplified Chinese: 隋东亮; traditional Chinese: 隋東亮; pinyin: Suí Dōngliàng; born September 24, 1977, in Dalian, Liaoning) is a Chinese former professional footballer. He played for Bayi Football Team and Beijing Guoan during his career.

== Club career ==
=== Bayi Football Team ===
As with all the most promising young Chinese players Sui Dongliang would quickly be included in the short-lived Chinese national youth team program to study football abroad in Brazil for a five-year training programme sponsored by Jianlibao and called the Chinese Jianlibao Youth Football Team. After graduating through the Jianlibao Youth Team he would move to Bayi Football Team (then called August 1) where he would go on to start his professional football career. With the team he would eventually establish himself as a regular member of the squad and stayed with the team until they disbanded in 2003.

=== Beijing Guoan ===
At the beginning of the 2004 league season he would join reigning Chinese FA Cup holders Beijing Guoan where he immediately became a regular within the team. He continued to play a vital part within the team until Huang Bowen would start to rise to prominence and replace him during the 2007 league season. By the 2009 league season Sui Dongliang would see his playing time significantly reduced and by the end of the 2009 league he decided to leave Beijing Guoan.

== International career ==
As part of the promising young Chinese players that were studying abroad the Chinese Head coach Qi Wusheng would include Sui Dongliang into his squad to make his debut in a friendly against USA on January 29, 1997, in a game that China won 2–1. He would go on to play for the Chinese U-20 that took part in the 1997 FIFA World Youth Championship and once the tournament finished he was one of several players that would graduate from the Chinese Jianlibao Youth Football Team to the senior team along with Li Jinyu, Li Tie and Zhang Xiaorui. Establishing himself as a regular within the team he would go on to score his first goal in a friendly against Malaysia on February 25, 1997, in a 2–0 win. When Bobby Houghton was introduced as the new Chinese Head coach Sui Dongliang would fall out of favour and while he was included in the squad that took part in the 1998 Asian Games once the tournament ended he would stop being included in any further squads during his career.

== Management career ==
On 12 August 2022, Sui was appointed as caretaker manager of Beijing Guoan after Xie Feng had resigned.
