= Yang Pu (footballer) =

Chinese footballer and manager

Yang Pu 杨璞
Personal information
- Full name: Yang Pu
- Date of birth: 30 March 1978 (age 48)
- Place of birth: Beijing, China
- Height: 1.78 m (5 ft 10 in)
- Positions: Full back; defensive midfielder

Team information
- Current team: Beijing Guoan (Head of Youth department)

Youth career
- 1994–1998: Beijing Victory

Senior career*
| Years | Team | Apps | (Gls) |
| 1998–2009 | Beijing Guoan | 212 | (15) |
| Total | | 212 | (15) |

International career
| 2001–2004 | China | 34 | (0) |

Managerial career
- 2009–: Beijing Guoan (Head of Youth department)
- * Club domestic league appearances and goals as of December 2009

Yang Pu (simplified Chinese: 杨璞; traditional Chinese: 楊璞; pinyin: Yáng Pú; born 30 March 1978 in Beijing) is a Chinese football manager and former player, He is currently the head of Youth department of Beijing Guoan.

He played his entire professional football career for Beijing Guoan as a holding midfielder, left back and left winger where he was also their captain. As an international player he represented the Chinese national team and was a participant at the 2002 FIFA World Cup squad where he played in two matches.

== Club career ==
Yang Pu started his professional football career for Beijing Guoan in the 1998 league season and due to versatility to also play as a midfield he would quickly become a squad regular. By the 2000 league season he had firmly established himself as their first choice left-back and became an integral member of the team. Despite several management changes he would remain a loyal member to the club and win his first piece of silverware with the 2003 Chinese FA Cup. His loyalty to the club would pay-off when he was named as their captain in the 2007 league season, however due to injury he rarely actually captained the team. At the end of the 2009 league season Yang Pu retired due to a persistent right knee injury, however despite this he was able to lead Beijing Guoan to the league title even though he missed much of the league season.

== International career ==
Yang Pu made his senior international debut in friendly against his ancestral country North Korea on August 3, 2001 in a 2-2 draw. Though predominantly a left back or left midfielder he was used was in a variety of positions for the Chinese football team and this versatility quickly saw him become a regular within the squad. Increasingly pushing for a place in the Chinese starting line-up he would be a participant at the 2002 FIFA World Cup and even play in two group games. With the introduction of Sun Xiang and Yan Song he saw his time limited within the team and he would play his last game against Kuwait on October 13, 2004 in a Fifa World Cup qualifier that China lost 1-0.

== Honours ==
=== Player ===
Beijing Guoan

- Chinese Super League: 2009
- Chinese FA Cup: 2003
- Chinese Football Super Cup: 2003
