= Cui Wei (footballer, born 1983) =

Chinese footballer

Cui Wei 崔威
Personal information
- Date of birth: April 7, 1983 (age 43)
- Place of birth: Beijing, China
- Height: 1.83 m (6 ft 0 in)
- Position: Defender

Youth career
- 1998–2002: Beijing Guoan
- 1999–2000: → Eintracht Frankfurt (loan)

Senior career*
Years	Team	Apps	(Gls)
2003–2007	Beijing Guoan	66	(1)
2008–2009	Changchun Yatai	9	(0)
2009	→ Guangzhou Evergrande (loan)	16	(0)
2013–2015	Beijing Baxy	46	(0)
2016	Beijing BIT	8	(1)
- * Club domestic league appearances and goals as of 15 September 2016

Cui Wei (Chinese:崔威; born April 7, 1983) is a Chinese former footballer who played as a defender.

== Club career ==
Cui Wei began his club career with the Beijing Guoan youth team in 1998 and was considered to be a rising prospect that was good enough to be loaned out to German club Eintracht Frankfurt youth team in 1999. In 2003, he graduated into the senior Beijing Guoan squad where he quickly established himself within the team and won the 2003 Chinese FA Cup with the club. With the introduction of Lee Jang-soo as the Head coach at the beginning of the 2007 Chinese Super League season, Cui Wei would struggle to maintain his position within the team and he transferred to fellow top-tier club Changchun Yatai. At the beginning of the 2009 Chinese Super League season Cui Wei was loaned out to Guangzhou Pharmaceutical after being unable to gain a regular place with Changchun Yatai. He was released at the end of 2009 season. Cui returned to play professional football in 2013 when he joined China League One club Beijing Baxy. He transferred to Beijing BIT in March 2016.

== Honours ==
Beijing Guoan

- Chinese FA Cup: 2003
- Chinese Football Super Cup: 2003
