= Xu Yunlong =

Chinese footballer

Xu Yunlong 徐云龙
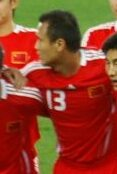

Personal information
- Full name: Xu Yunlong
- Date of birth: 17 February 1979 (age 47)
- Place of birth: Beijing, China
- Height: 1.82 m (6 ft 0 in)
- Position: Defender

Youth career
- 1993–1994: Beijing Youth
- 1994–1998: Beijing Victory

Senior career*
Years	Team	Apps	(Gls)
1999–2016	Beijing Guoan	415	(28)

International career^{‡}
2000–2008	China	72	(7)
Medal record
Representing China
Men's football
AFC Asian Cup
Silver medal – second place	2004 China	Team
East Asian Football Championship
Bronze medal – third place	2003 Japan	Team
Gold medal – first place	2005 South Korea	Team
Bronze medal – third place	2008 China	Team
- * Club domestic league appearances and goals as of 30 October 2016 ‡ National team caps and goals as of 31 October 2015

Xu Yunlong (simplified Chinese: 徐云龙; traditional Chinese: 徐雲龍; pinyin: Xú Yúnlóng; born 17 February 1979) is a Chinese former footballer who played as a defender for Beijing Guoan and China national team.

== Club career ==
Xu Yunlong started his football career with Beijing Guoan in the 1999 season, making thirteen league appearances and quickly established himself as a versatile player. By the following season, he continued to gain considerably more playing time for Beijing and would often be used as a right back where his pace was quickly exploited; however, after several seasons, he played increasingly more at centre back and become an integral member of the club's defense. Xu's importance towards the team was shown in the 2008 league season when he would be named as the club's vice captain and then later as their captain, leading the club to the league title during the 2009 season.

On 26 February 2017, Xu retired from football and became the Commercial Director of Beijing Guoan.

== International career ==
Xu made his debut for the Chinese national team on 25 May 2000 in a 2-0 loss against Yugoslavia. Under then manager Bora Milutinović, Xu's international career flourished by keeping previous right back Sun Jihai out of the national team during the 2000 AFC Asian Cup. However, he was forced out of action due to illness and Sun regained his place within the team; nevertheless, his performances were still good enough to be called up the squad that participated in the 2002 FIFA World Cup.

== International goals ==
No.	Date	Venue	Opponent	Score	Result	Competition
1.	25 July 2004	Workers Stadium, Beijing, China	Qatar	1–0	1–0	2004 AFC Asian Cup
2.	17 November 2004	Tianhe Stadium, Guangzhou, China	Hong Kong	5–0	7–0	2006 FIFA World Cup qualification

== Career statistics ==
As of 30 October 2016

Club performance			League		Cup		League Cup		Continental		Other		Total	
Season	Club	League	Apps	Goals	Apps	Goals	Apps	Goals	Apps	Goals	Apps	Goals	Apps	Goals
China PR			League		FA Cup		CSL Cup		Asia		Others^{1}		Total	
1999	Beijing Guoan	Chinese Jia-A League	13	0		1	-		-		-		13	0
2000	Beijing Guoan	Chinese Jia-A League	21	2	8	2	-		-		-		29	4
2001	Beijing Guoan	Chinese Jia-A League	17	2	2	1	-		-		-		19	3
2002	Beijing Guoan	Chinese Jia-A League	28	8	0	0	-		-		-		28	8
2003	Beijing Guoan	Chinese Jia-A League	21	3	6	3	-		-		-		27	6
2004	Beijing Guoan	Chinese Super League	22	2	2	0	0	0	-		1	1	25	3
2005	Beijing Guoan	Chinese Super League	26	5	4	2	4	1	-		-		34	8
2006	Beijing Guoan	Chinese Super League	27	1	1	0	-		-		-		28	1
2007	Beijing Guoan	Chinese Super League	26	1	-		-		-		-		26	1
2008	Beijing Guoan	Chinese Super League	27	0	-		-		4	0	-		31	0
2009	Beijing Guoan	Chinese Super League	24	1	-		-		5	0	-		29	1
2010	Beijing Guoan	Chinese Super League	25	1	-		-		7	0	-		32	1
2011	Beijing Guoan	Chinese Super League	24	0	2	0	-		-		-		26	0
2012	Beijing Guoan	Chinese Super League	29	1	2	0	-		4	0	-		35	1
2013	Beijing Guoan	Chinese Super League	27	0	3	1	-		7	0	-		37	1
2014	Beijing Guoan	Chinese Super League	26	1	3	0	-		6	0	-		35	1
2015	Beijing Guoan	Chinese Super League	24	0	0	0	-		7	0	-		31	0
2016	Beijing Guoan	Chinese Super League	8	0	2	0	-		-		-		10	0
Career total			415	28	35	9	4	1	40	0	1	1	495	39

^{1}Other tournaments include Chinese FA Super Cup.

== Honours ==
=== Club ===
Beijing Guoan

- Chinese Super League: 2009
- Chinese FA Cup: 2003
- Chinese FA Super Cup: 2003

=== International ===
China PR national football team

- East Asian Football Championship: 2005

=== Individual ===
- Chinese Super League Team of the Year: 2003, 2006, 2007, 2009. 2013, 2014, 2015
