= Yang Hao (footballer, born 1983) =

Chinese footballer

Yang Hao 杨昊
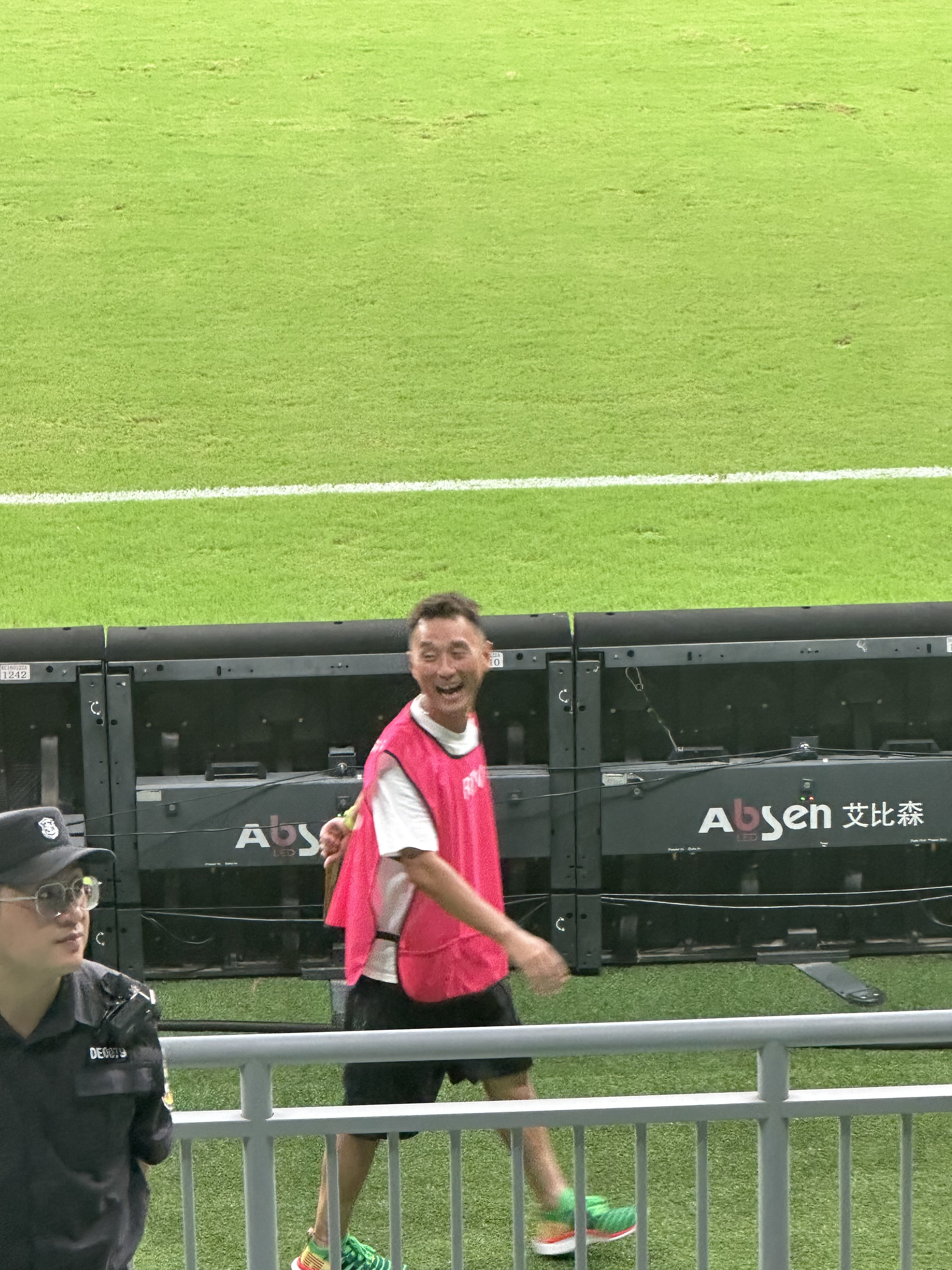
- Yang Hao in August 2024

Personal information
- Full name: Yang Hao
- Date of birth: 19 August 1983 (age 43)
- Place of birth: Beijing, China
- Height: 1.76 m (5 ft 9 in)
- Position: Midfielder

Youth career
- 1998–2001: Beijing Guoan

Senior career*
Years	Team	Apps	(Gls)
2002–2010	Beijing Guoan	125	(12)
2011	Guangzhou Evergrande	22	(0)
2012–2014	Guizhou Renhe	58	(1)
2014–2016	Jiangsu Sainty	25	(1)
2017–2022	Shaanxi Chang'an Athletic	108	(6)

International career^{‡}
2009–2014	China	37	(2)
Medal record
Representing China
Men's football
EAFF Championship
Gold medal – first place	2010 Japan	Team
Silver medal – second place	2013 South Korea	Team
- * Club domestic league appearances and goals as of 22 December 2023 ‡ National team caps and goals as of 22 March 2015

Yang Hao (simplified Chinese: 杨昊; traditional Chinese: 楊昊; pinyin: Yáng Hào; born 19 August 1983) is a retired Chinese professional footballer who played as a central midfielder.

== Club career ==
Yang Hao started his football career with Beijing Guoan after graduating from their youth academy during the 2001 league season. He would gradually establish himself within the following season at Beijing as an attacking midfielder who was also capable in playing as a striker. He however found it difficult to gain a continuous place within the starting eleven until the 2004 league season when he was able to play in 19 league games. His run within the squad was short lived after the introduction of Shen Xiangfu as the club's new manager at the beginning of the 2005 league season, which saw Yang's playing time severely limited. Only after the introduction of Lee Jang-Soo at the beginning of the 2007 league season did Yang start to become an integral member of the Beijing squad and when he started to settle within the team's midfield by the 2009 league season he would aid the team to the league title.

In January 2011, Yang joined recently promoted side Guangzhou Evergrande on a free transfer. On 2 April 2011, he would make his debut for the club in a 1-0 win against Dalian Shide. Throughout the 2011 season, he saw the ambitious club go on to win the league title; however, Yang was not a regular for the club and he decided to join Guizhou Renhe before the 2012 season.

On 8 July 2014, Yang transferred to fellow Chinese Super League side Jiangsu Sainty. He made his debut for the club on 19 July 2014 in a 3-2 loss against Guangzhou R&F. He left Jiangsu at the end of 2016 season after his contract ended.

Yang signed for China League Two side Shaanxi Chang'an Athletic in July 2017.

== International career ==
Yang would make his international debut against Iran in a friendly which the Chinese national team won 1-0 on 1 June 2009. He would play in several further friendlies and quickly became an integral member of the national team and even go on to score his first goal against Palestine in a 3-1 victory on 18 July 2009. Then Chinese manager Gao Hongbo would make sure that Yang would be a starter for all of China's vital games and included him in the squad that won the 2010 East Asian Football Championship before included him in the squad for the 2011 AFC Asian Cup.

== Career statistics ==
=== Club statistics ===
Statistics accurate as of match played 31 December 2020.

Appearances and goals by club, season and competition
Club	Season	League			National Cup		League Cup		Continental		Other		Total	
Club	Season	Division	Apps	Goals	Apps	Goals	Apps	Goals	Apps	Goals	Apps	Goals	Apps	Goals
Beijing Guoan	2002	Chinese Super League	7	0			-		-		-		7	0
Beijing Guoan	2003	Chinese Super League	12	1	2	3	-		-		1 (Note: Appearances in Chinese FA Super Cup)	1	15	5
Beijing Guoan	2004	Chinese Super League	19	1		0		0	-		-		19	1
Beijing Guoan	2005	Chinese Super League	9	3		0		0	-		-		9	3
Beijing Guoan	2006	Chinese Super League	12	1		0	-		-		-		12	1
Beijing Guoan	2007	Chinese Super League	5	1	-		-		-		-		5	1
Beijing Guoan	2008	Chinese Super League	21	1	-		-		3	2	-		24	3
Beijing Guoan	2009	Chinese Super League	21	3	-		-		1	0	-		22	3
Beijing Guoan	2010	Chinese Super League	19	1	-		-		1	0	-		20	1
Beijing Guoan	Total		125	12	2	3	0	0	5	2	1	1	133	18
Guangzhou Evergrande	2011	Chinese Super League	22	0	0	0	-		-		-		22	0
Guizhou Renhe	2012	Chinese Super League	28	1	5	0	-		-		-		33	1
Guizhou Renhe	2013	Chinese Super League	20	0	4	0	-		6	0	-		30	0
Guizhou Renhe	2014	Chinese Super League	10	0	0	0	-		6	0	1	0	17	0
Guizhou Renhe	Total		58	1	9	0	0	0	12	0	1	0	80	1
Jiangsu Sainty	2014	Chinese Super League	13	1	6	0	-		-		-		19	1
Jiangsu Sainty	2015	Chinese Super League	8	0	1	0	-		-		-		9	0
Jiangsu Sainty	2016	Chinese Super League	4	0	2	0	-		-		0	0	6	0
Jiangsu Sainty	Total		25	1	9	0	0	0	0	0	0	0	34	1
Shaanxi Chang'an Athletic	2017	China League Two	8	2	0	0	-		-		-		8	2
Shaanxi Chang'an Athletic	2018	China League Two	17	0	0	0	-		-		-		17	0
Shaanxi Chang'an Athletic	2019	China League One	27	0	1	0	-		-		-		28	0
Shaanxi Chang'an Athletic	2020	China League One	15	4	-		-		-		-		15	4
Shaanxi Chang'an Athletic	Total		67	6	1	0	0	0	0	0	0	0	68	6
Career total			297	20	21	3	0	0	17	2	2	1	337	26

=== International goals ===
Results list China's goal tally first.

Date	Venue	Opponent	Result	Competition
18 July 2009	Tianjin, China	Palestine	3-1	Friendly international
12 August 2009	Singapore	Singapore	1-1	Friendly international

== Honours ==
=== Club ===
Beijing Guoan

- Chinese Super League: 2009
- Chinese FA Cup: 2003
- Chinese Football Super Cup: 2003

Guangzhou Evergrande

- Chinese Super League: 2011

Guizhou Renhe

- Chinese FA Cup: 2013
- Chinese FA Super Cup: 2014

Jiangsu Sainty

- Chinese FA Cup: 2015

=== Individual ===
China PR national football team

- East Asian Football Championship: 2010
