= Du Wenhui =

Chinese footballer

Du Wenhui 杜文辉
Personal information
- Date of birth: December 19, 1983 (age 42)
- Place of birth: Xuanwu, Beijing, China
- Height: 1.82 m (6 ft 0 in)
- Position: Striker

Youth career
- 1998–1999: Beijing Guoan
- 1999–2000: Eintracht Frankfurt

Senior career*
Years	Team	Apps	(Gls)
2000–2010	Beijing Guoan	102	(15)
2011–2012	Jiangsu Sainty	26	(0)
2013	Hunan Billows	13	(1)
2014	Hebei Zhongji	27	(2)

International career^{‡}
2007–2008	China	3	(0)
- * Club domestic league appearances and goals as of 12 November 2014 ‡ National team caps and goals as of 30 October 2012

Du Wenhui (simplified Chinese: 杜文辉; traditional Chinese: 杜文輝; pinyin: Dù Wénhuī) is a Chinese former football player, able to play in numerous attacking positions.

== Club career ==
Originally starting his youth career at Beijing Guoan his performances were impressive enough for Eintracht Frankfurt to take him into their youth team. Du Wenhui however would return to Beijing Guoan to start his professional senior career in the 2001 season. He has since continued to play for Beijing Guoan throughout his career, though he mainly plays as a striker he has had to often sacrifice his position to the numerous foreign strikers who have played for the team or play out of position. Despite rarely playing in his favoured position his versatility in attack has always meant that he remains a consistent regular within the team and this would help Beijing win the 2009 Chinese Super League title.

In January 2011, Du transferred to top tier side Jiangsu Sainty and in his debut season he would be part of the team that finished in Jiangsu's highest ever league finish of fourth.

== International career ==
Du Wenhui would start his international career on February 7, 2007 in a friendly against Kazakhstan in a 2-1 win where he came on as a substitute for Li Jinyu. He would go on to make several further friendly appearances, however all were as a substitute and he failed to gain a regular place within the team.

== Honours ==
Beijing Guoan

- Chinese Super League: 2009
- Chinese FA Cup: 2003
