= 2013 Beijing Guoan F.C. season =

Beijing Guoan
2013 season
- Manager: Aleksandar Stanojević
- Stadium: Workers Stadium
- Super League: 3rd
- FA Cup: Semi-finals
- AFC Champions League: Round of 16
- Average home league attendance: 39,269

The 2013 Beijing Guoan F.C. season was their 10th consecutive season in the Chinese Super League, established in the 2004 season, and 23rd consecutive season in the top flight of Chinese football. They competed at the Chinese Super League, AFC Champions League and Chinese FA Cup.

== First team ==
As of September 28, 2013

Note: Flags indicate national team as defined under FIFA eligibility rules; some limited exceptions apply. Players may hold more than one non-FIFA nationality.

No.	Pos.	Nation	Player
1	GK	CHN	Zhang Sipeng
2	DF	UZB	Egor Krimets
3	DF	CHN	Yu Yang
4	DF	CHN	Zhou Ting
5	MF	CRO	Darko Matić
6	MF	CHN	Zhang Xiaobin
7	MF	CHN	Yang Yun
8	FW	ECU	Joffre Guerrón
10	MF	CHN	Zhang Xizhe
11	MF	MLI	Frédéric Kanouté
12	GK	CHN	Hou Sen
13	DF	CHN	Xu Yunlong (Captain)
15	FW	NGA	Peter Utaka
18	MF	CHN	Lang Zheng
19	MF	CHN	Wang Xiaolong

No.	Pos.	Nation	Player
20	DF	CHN	Zhang Xinxin
21	DF	CHN	Liu Guangxu
22	GK	CHN	Yang Zhi
24	MF	CHN	Li Hanbo
25	DF	CHN	Zhang Shuai
26	MF	CHN	Wang Hao
29	MF	CHN	Shao Jiayi
31	MF	CHN	Du Shuaishuai
32	MF	CHN	Tong Le
34	DF	CHN	Zhang Yu
35	MF	CHN	Li Tixiang
36	GK	CHN	Bai Xiaolei
37	MF	CHN	Du Mingyang
39	MF	CHN	Piao Cheng
40	DF	CHN	Cao Hanchen
68	MF	CHN	Zhang Chengdong

== Transfers ==
=== Winter ===
In:

No.	Pos.	Nation	Player
1	GK	CHN	Zhang Sipeng (loan return from Beijing Yitong Kuche)
2	DF	UZB	Egor Krimets (loan from (Uzbekistan) Pakhtakor Tashkent)
38	FW	BRA	André Lima (from (Brazil) Grêmio)
-	MF	CHN	Lu Jiang (loan return from Hunan Billows)

Out:

No.	Pos.	Nation	Player
6	MF	CHN	Xu Liang (to Shanghai Shenhua)
7	MF	CHN	Wang Changqing (to Shanghai Shenhua)
8	FW	POR	Manú (Released)
21	MF	CHN	Zhu Yifan (loan to Henan Jianye)
25	DF	CHN	Jiao Zhe (loan return to Shandong Luneng)
31	FW	CHN	Hu Qiling (to Beijing Baxy)
37	FW	BRA	Reinaldo (to (Brazil) Operário)
38	DF	CHN	Meng Yang (to Meizhou Kejia)
40	DF	SEN	François (Released)
-	MF	CHN	Lu Jiang (to Beijing Baxy)

=== Summer ===
In:

No.	Pos.	Nation	Player
14	DF	HKG	Lee Chi Ho (from (Hong Kong) South China)
15	FW	NGA	Peter Utaka (from Dalian Aerbin)
68	FW	CHN	Zhang Chengdong (from (Portugal) C.D. Mafra)
-	FW	SRB	Andrija Kaluđerović (loan return from (Spain) Racing de Santander)

Out:

No.	Pos.	Nation	Player
9	FW	CHN	Tan Tiancheng (loan to Lijiang Jiayunhao)
14	DF	HKG	Lee Chi Ho (loan to (Hong Kong) South China)
16	DF	CHN	Zhang Junzhe (loan to Shenyang Dongjin)
17	MF	CHN	Xu Wu (loan to Shenyang Dongjin)
23	DF	CHN	Jiang Tao (loan to Meizhou Kejia)
27	DF	CHN	Zhang Yonghai (loan to Shanghai Shenxin)
28	MF	CHN	Zhang Jian (loan to Hebei Zhongji)
30	DF	CHN	Lei Tenglong (loan to (Portugal) Marítimo)
33	FW	CHN	Mao Jianqing (loan to Shanghai Shenxin)
38	FW	BRA	André Lima (loan to (Brazil) Vitória)
47	DF	CHN	Zhang Jizhou (loan to Beijing BIT)
-	FW	SRB	Andrija Kaluđerović (loan to (Serbia) FK Vojvodina)

== Staff ==
Position	Staff
Team leader	(China) Wei Kexing
Head coach	(Serbia) Aleksandar Stanojević
Assistant coach	(Serbia) Slobodan Kuljanin
Assistant coach	(Serbia) Goran Pandurović
Goalkeeping coach	(China) Li Leilei
Fitness coach	(China) Xue Shen
Team physician	(China) Shuang Yin
Team physician	(China) Zhang Yang
Kit manager	(China) Kang Yuming

== Competitions ==
=== Chinese Super League ===
==== Table ====
Pos	Team	Pld	W	D	L	GF	GA	GD	Pts	Qualification or relegation
1	Guangzhou Evergrande (C)	30	24	5	1	78	18	+60	77	Qualification to Champions League group stage
2	Shandong Luneng	30	18	5	7	55	35	+20	59	Qualification to Champions League group stage
3	Beijing Guoan	30	14	9	7	54	31	+23	51	Qualification to Champions League qualifying round 3
4	Guizhou Renhe (Note: Guizhou Renhe qualified for the 2014 AFC Champions League Group Stage from winning the 2013 Chinese FA Cup.)	30	11	11	8	40	41	−1	44	Qualification to Champions League group stage
5	Dalian Aerbin	30	11	8	11	40	43	−3	41	

Source: Chinese Super League (in Chinese)
Rules for classification: 1st points; 2nd head-to-head points; 3rd head-to-head goal difference; 4th head-to-head goals scored; 5th goal difference; 6th goals scored; 7th disciplinary points (1 point for each yellow card, 3 points for each red card). Head-to-Head: used when head-to-head record is used to rank tied teams.
(C) Champions
