= 2014 Beijing Guoan F.C. season =

Beijing Guoan
2014 season
- Chairman: Li Shilin
- Manager: Gregorio Manzano
- Stadium: Workers Stadium
- Super League: 2nd
- Chinese FA Cup: Fifth round
- AFC Champions League: Group stage
- Highest home attendance: 52,301
- Lowest home attendance: 32,012
- Average home league attendance: 39,395

The 2014 Beijing Guoan F.C. season was their 11th consecutive season in the Chinese Super League, established in 2004. They competed in the AFC Champions League and Chinese FA Cup.

== Players ==
=== First team squad ===
As of 27 July 2014

Note: Flags indicate national team as defined under FIFA eligibility rules; some limited exceptions apply. Players may hold more than one non-FIFA nationality.

No.	Pos.	Nation	Player
1	GK	CHN	Zhang Sipeng
2	DF	CHN	Li Yunqiu
3	DF	CHN	Yu Yang
4	DF	CHN	Zhou Ting
5	MF	CRO	Darko Matić
6	MF	CHN	Zhang Xiaobin
7	DF	CHN	Yang Yun
9	FW	CHN	Tan Tiancheng
10	MF	CHN	Zhang Xizhe
11	MF	CHN	Song Boxuan
12	GK	CHN	Hou Sen
13	DF	CHN	Xu Yunlong (captain)
16	MF	KOR	Ha Dae-Sung
17	MF	ARG	Pablo Batalla
18	DF	CHN	Lang Zheng
20	DF	CHN	Zhang Xinxin
21	FW	SWE	Erton Fejzullahu (on loan from Djurgårdens IF)
22	GK	CHN	Yang Zhi

No.	Pos.	Nation	Player
23	MF	CHN	Chen Zhizhao
24	DF	CHN	Li Hanbo
25	DF	CHN	Zhang Shuai
26	MF	CHN	Wang Hao
27	FW	MNE	Dejan Damjanović
28	DF	CHN	Zhang Chengdong
29	MF	CHN	Shao Jiayi
30	DF	CHN	Lei Tenglong
31	DF	CHN	Zhao Hejing
33	DF	CHN	Wei Xin
34	MF	CHN	Ba Dun
35	MF	CHN	Li Tixiang
36	GK	CHN	Bai Xiaolei
37	MF	CHN	Du Mingyang
38	MF	CHN	Du Shuaishuai
39	MF	CHN	Piao Cheng
40	MF	CHN	Cao Hanchen

=== Reserve squad ===
Note: Flags indicate national team as defined under FIFA eligibility rules; some limited exceptions apply. Players may hold more than one non-FIFA nationality.

No.	Pos.	Nation	Player
32	MF	CHN	Tong Le
41	FW	CHN	Qin Beichen
42	MF	CHN	Fan Yang
44	GK	CHN	Zhang Hao
45	DF	CHN	Wang Junming
46	FW	CHN	He Lilong
47	DF	CHN	Zhang Yu
48	FW	CHN	Gong Zheng
49	MF	CHN	Tang Fan
52	MF	CHN	Zhong Jiyu

No.	Pos.	Nation	Player
53	MF	CHN	Hu Zhuqi
54	MF	CHN	Li Bowen
55	GK	CHN	Zhao Shi
57	DF	CHN	Zhao Bin
58	MF	CHN	Wang Hongyu
59	DF	CHN	Sheng Pengfei
60	FW	CHN	Zhu Chaoqing
61	DF	CHN	Zhang Junzhe
63	MF	CHN	Zhang Jian
64	MF	CHN	Xu Wu

== Club ==
=== Coaching staff ===
Position	Staff
Head coach	(Spain) Gregorio Manzano
Assistant coaches	(China) Xie Feng
Assistant coaches	(Spain) José Manuel González López
Assistant coaches	(Spain) José María Quevedo
Assistant coaches	(Spain) Salvilla
Goalkeeping coach	(China) Li Leilei
Fitness coach	(China) Xue Shen
Team physicians	(China) Shuang Yin (China) Zhang Yang

|}

== Transfers ==
=== Winter ===
In:

No.	Pos.	Nation	Player
2	DF	CHN	Li Yunqiu (from Shanghai Dongya)
9	FW	CHN	Tan Tiancheng (loan return from Lijiang Jiayunhao)
11	MF	CHN	Song Boxuan (from Shanghai Shenhua)
16	MF	KOR	Ha Dae-Sung (from (South Korea) FC Seoul)
17	MF	ARG	Pablo Batalla (from (Turkey) Bursaspor)
23	MF	CHN	Chen Zhizhao (from Shanghai Shenxin)
31	DF	CHN	Zhao Hejing (from Dalian Aerbin)
-	MF	CHN	Xu Wu (loan return from Shenyang Dongjin)
-	FW	BRA	André Lima (loan return from (Brazil) Vitória)
-	DF	CHN	Zhang Junzhe (loan return from Shenyang Dongjin)
-	DF	CHN	Jiang Tao (loan return from Meizhou Kejia)
-	MF	CHN	Zhang Jian (loan return from Hebei Zhongji)
-	DF	CHN	Zhang Jizhou (loan return from Beijing BIT)
-	DF	CHN	Meng Yang (loan return from Meizhou Kejia)
-	DF	CHN	Zhang Yonghai (loan return from Shanghai Shenxin)
-	FW	CHN	Mao Jianqing (loan return from Shanghai Shenxin)
-	MF	CHN	Zhu Yifan (loan return from Henan Jianye)
-	DF	HKG	Lee Chi Ho (loan return from (Hong Kong) South China)
-	FW	SRB	Andrija Kaluđerović (loan return from (Serbia) FK Vojvodina)

Out:

No.	Pos.	Nation	Player
2	DF	UZB	Egor Krimets (loan return to (Uzbekistan) Pakhtakor Tashkent)
11	FW	MLI	Frédéric Kanouté (Retired)
14	DF	HKG	Lee Chi Ho (to (Hong Kong) South China)
19	MF	CHN	Wang Xiaolong (to Guangzhou R&F)
27	DF	CHN	Zhang Yonghai (Released)
33	FW	CHN	Mao Jianqing (loan to Qingdao Jonoon)
35	MF	CHN	Li Tixiang (loan to (Portugal) C.D. Tondela)
-	MF	CHN	Zhu Yifan (to Henan Jianye)
-	DF	CHN	Meng Yang (to Beijing BIT)
-	FW	SRB	Andrija Kaluđerović (loan to (Cyprus) AEL Limassol)

=== Summer ===
In:

No.	Pos.	Nation	Player
21	FW	SWE	Erton Fejzullahu (loan from (Sweden) Djurgårdens IF)
27	FW	MNE	Dejan Damjanović (from Jiangsu Sainty)
30	DF	CHN	Lei Tenglong (loan return from (Portugal) Marítimo)
35	MF	CHN	Li Tixiang (loan return from (Portugal) Tondela)
-	DF	HKG	Lee Chi Ho (loan return from (Hong Kong) South China)
-	FW	SRB	Andrija Kaluđerović (loan return from (Cyprus) AEL Limassol)

Out:

No.	Pos.	Nation	Player
8	MF	ECU	Joffre Guerrón (to (Mexico) Tigres UANL)
15	FW	NGR	Peter Utaka (loan to Shanghai Shenxin)
43	DF	CHN	Liu Guangxu (Released)
50	DF	CHN	Li Lei (to Guangzhou R&F)
-	DF	HKG	Lee Chi Ho (to (Hong Kong) Eastern Salon)
-	FW	SRB	Andrija Kaluđerović (to (Switzerland) FC Thun)

== Friendlies ==
=== Pre-season ===
19 January 2014 Friendly	Lokomotiv Tashkent (Uzbekistan)	0 – 1	Beijing Guoan	Dubai

21 January 2014 Friendly	Metalist Kharkiv (Ukraine)	3 – 1	Beijing Guoan	Dubai
	Blanco 54'; Homenyuk 64'; Marlos 83' (pen.)	Report	Zhang 70' (pen.)

24 January 2014 Friendly	Shakhtar Donetsk (Ukraine)	2 – 0	Beijing Guoan	Dubai
	Taison 43'; Dentinho 69'

26 January 2014 Friendly	Ural Sverdlovsk Oblast (Russia)	3 – 1	Beijing Guoan	Dubai

28 January 2014 Friendly	Dynamo Moscow (Russia)	0 – 0	Beijing Guoan	Dubai

6 February 2014 Friendly	Shanghai Shenhua (China)	1 – 2	Beijing Guoan	Shanghai
	Cao 12'		Zhang 8'; Wang 38'

9 February 2014 Friendly	Shanghai Shenxin (China)	0 – 2	Beijing Guoan	Shanghai
			Zhou 4'; Utaka 38'

21 February 2014 Friendly	Shenyang Zhongze (China)	0 – 1	Beijing Guoan	Shanghai

== Competitions ==
=== Chinese Super League ===
==== Matches ====
8 March 2014 1	Beijing Guoan	1 – 0	Changchun Yatai	Beijing
19:30 UTC+8	Batalla 68'			Stadium: Workers Stadium; Referee: Ma Ning

15 March 2014 2	Dalian Aerbin	0 – 1	Beijing Guoan	Dalian
15:30 UTC+8			Batalla 51'	Stadium: Dalian Sports Center; Referee: Zhou Gang

24 March 2014 3	Beijing Guoan	2 – 0	Shanghai Shenhua	Beijing
19:30 UTC+8	Zhang 39' (pen.); Batalla 53'			Stadium: Workers Stadium; Referee: Li Jun

28 March 2014 4	Shanghai East Asia	1 – 0	Beijing Guoan	Shanghai
19:45 UTC+8	Hysén 71'			Stadium: Shanghai Stadium; Referee: Wang Jin

7 April 2014 5	Beijing Guoan	2 – 0	Guangzhou R&F	Beijing
19:30 UTC+8	Guerrón 45+1'; Shao 88'			Stadium: Workers Stadium; Referee: Shi Zhenlu

11 April 2014 6	Guizhou Renhe	1 – 2	Beijing Guoan	Guiyang
20:00 UTC+8	Zhang 72'		Song 55'; Batalla 80'	Stadium: Guiyang Olympic Sports Center; Referee: Wang Di

19 April 2014 7	Beijing Guoan	0 – 3	Shandong Luneng	Beijing
19:30 UTC+8			Love 9', 67', 82'	Stadium: Workers Stadium; Referee: Zhou Gang

27 April 2014 8	Harbin Yiteng	0 – 1	Beijing Guoan	Harbin
16:00 UTC+8			Chen 43'	Stadium: Harbin Sports City Center Stadium; Referee: Wang Jin

30 April 2014 9	Beijing Guoan	1 – 0	Jiangsu Guoxin-Sainty	Beijing
19:30 UTC+8	Chen 61'			Stadium: Workers Stadium; Referee: Guo Baolong

3 May 2014 10	Tianjin Teda	0 – 1	Beijing Guoan	Tianjin
19:35 UTC+8			Batalla 4'	Stadium: Tianjin Olympic Center Stadium; Referee: Li Jun

10 May 2014 11	Beijing Guoan	1 – 0	Liaoning Whowin	Beijing
19:30 UTC+8	Batalla 90+7' (pen.)			Stadium: Workers Stadium; Referee: Ma Ning

17 May 2014 12	Shanghai Shenxin	2 – 1	Beijing Guoan	Shanghai
20:15 UTC+8	Johnny 6'; Lim 47'		Zhang 32'	Stadium: Jinshan Sports Centre; Referee: Shi Zhenlu

21 May 2014 13	Beijing Guoan	4 – 0	Hangzhou Greentown	Beijing
19:30 UTC+8	Guerrón 41'; Zhang 46'; Batalla 56' (pen.); Utaka 65'			Stadium: Workers Stadium; Referee: Chen Gang

26 May 2014 14	Beijing Guoan	1 – 1	Guangzhou Evergrande	Beijing
19:35 UTC+8	Zhang 5'		Elkeson 41'	Stadium: Workers Stadium; Referee: Li Jun

20 July 2014 15	Henan Jianye	2 – 1	Beijing Guoan	Zhengzhou
20:00 UTC+8	Johnson 3'; Xiao 70'		Shao 80'	Stadium: Zhengzhou Hanghai Stadium; Referee: Wang Jin

26 July 2014 16	Changchun Yatai	2 – 2	Beijing Guoan	Changchun
19:30 UTC+8	Eninho 15' (pen.); Iglesias 41'		Zhang 45+2'; Zhang 45+4'	Stadium: Development Area Stadium; Referee: Chen Gang

30 July 2014 17	Beijing Guoan	4 – 1	Dalian Aerbin	Beijing
19:30 UTC+8	Piao 57'; Fejzullahu 74', 86'; Chen 90+4'		Bruno 68'	Stadium: Workers Stadium; Referee: Ma Ning

2 August 2014 18	Shanghai Shenhua	0 – 3	Beijing Guoan	Shanghai
19:45 UTC+8			Damjanović 50'; Chen 83'; Piao 88'	Stadium: Hongkou Football Stadium; Referee: Fu Ming

10 August 2014 19	Beijing Guoan	2 – 0	Shanghai East Asia	Beijing
19:30 UTC+8	Damjanović 33', 74'			Stadium: Workers Stadium; Referee: Li Jun

13 August 2014 20	Guangzhou R&F	3 – 1	Beijing Guoan	Guangzhou
19:30 UTC+8	Hamdallah 37'; Jiang 67'; Olanare 90'		Ha 78'	Stadium: Yuexiushan Stadium; Referee: Ma Ning

18 August 2014 21	Beijing Guoan	2 – 1	Guizhou Renhe	Beijing
19:30 UTC+8	Fejzullahu 35', 85'		Yu 56'	Stadium: Workers Stadium; Referee: Shi Zhenlu

23 August 2014 22	Shandong Luneng	2 – 2	Beijing Guoan	Jinan
19:30 UTC+8	Love 4'; Aloísio 45+2'		Matić 29'; Fejzullahu 52'	Stadium: Jinan Olympic Sports Center Stadium; Referee: Ma Ning

31 August 2014 23	Beijing Guoan	2 – 0	Harbin Yiteng	Beijing
19:30 UTC+8	Damjanović 1', 73'			Stadium: Workers Stadium; Referee: Wang Di

13 September 2014 24	Jiangsu Guoxin-Sainty	2 – 3	Beijing Guoan	Zhenjiang
19:30 UTC+8	Wu 21'; Antar 56' (pen.)		Xu 37'; Damjanović 64'; Zhang 74' (pen.)	Stadium: Zhenjiang Sports and Exhibition Center; Referee: Shi Zhenlu

20 September 2014 25	Beijing Guoan	2 – 1	Tianjin Teda	Beijing
19:30 UTC+8	Fejzullahu 37', 71'		Andrezinho 36'	Stadium: Workers Stadium; Referee: Guo Baolong

28 September 2014 26	Liaoning Whowin	1 – 3	Beijing Guoan	Liaoning
19:30 UTC+8	Ogbu 54'		Damjanović 7', 32', 47'	Stadium: Liaoning Panjin Stadium; Referee: Zhou Gang

5 October 2014 27	Beijing Guoan	2 – 1	Shanghai Shenxin	Beijing
19:30 UTC+8	Damjanović 4'; Lang 68'		Everton 77'	Stadium: Workers Stadium; Referee: Ma Ning

19 October 2014 28	Hangzhou Greentown	1 – 2	Beijing Guoan	Hangzhou
19:35 UTC+8	Ramon 33'		Zhang 58'; Batalla 90+2' (pen.)	Stadium: Yellow Dragon Stadium; Referee: Guo Baolong

26 October 2014 29	Guangzhou Evergrande	0 – 1	Beijing Guoan	Guangzhou
15:35 UTC+8			Shao 87'	Stadium: Tianhe Stadium; Referee: Yoshiro Imamura

2 November 2014 30	Beijing Guoan	0 – 0	Henan Jianye	Beijing
15:35 UTC+8				Stadium: Workers Stadium

=== Chinese FA Cup ===
15 July 2014 Third Round	Shenyang Zhongze	0 – 1	Beijing Guoan	Shenyang
19:30 UTC+8			Batalla 35'	Stadium: Tiexi New District Sports Center; Referee: Shi Zhenlu

23 July Fourth Round	Guizhou Renhe	0 – 3	Beijing Guoan	Guiyang
19:30 UTC+8			Damjanović 26'; Shao Jiayi 51'; Zhang Xizhe 69' (pen.)	Stadium: Guiyang Olympic Sports Center; Referee: Fu Ming

6 August 2014 Fifth Round	Beijing Guoan	1 – 1 (3 – 5 p)	Shandong Luneng Taishan	Beijing
20:30		Summary		Stadium: Workers Stadium; Referee: Wang Jin
	Penalties
	Zhang Xizhe (penalty scored); Matić (penalty scored); Shao Jiayi (penalty scored); Xu Yunlong (penalty missed)		(penalty scored) Aloísio; (penalty scored) Júnior Urso; (penalty scored) McGowan; (penalty scored) Zhang Wenzhao; (penalty scored) Vágner Love

=== AFC Champions League ===
==== Round 3 ====
15 February 2014 Round 3	Beijing Guoan (China)	4 - 0	(Thailand) Chonburi	Beijing
19:30 UTC+8	Guerrón 1', 11'; Utaka 18'; Shao Jiayi 90'	Report		Stadium: Workers Stadium; Referee: Valentin Kovalenko (Uzbekistan)

==== Group stage ====
Group F
Team	Pld	W	D	L	GF	GA	GD	Pts
(South Korea) FC Seoul	6	3	2	1	9	6	+3	11
(Japan) Sanfrecce Hiroshima	6	2	3	1	9	8	+1	9
(China) Beijing Guoan	6	1	3	2	7	8	-1	6
(Australia) Central Coast Mariners	6	2	0	4	4	7	-3	6

25 February 2014 1	Sanfrecce Hiroshima (Japan)	1 - 1	(China) Beijing Guoan	Hiroshima
19:00 UTC+9	Kazuhiko Chiba 77'	Report	Ha Dae-Sung 62'	Stadium: Hiroshima Big Arch; Attendance: 6,021; Referee: Abdulla Hassan Mohamed (United Arab Emirates)

11 March 2014 2	Beijing Guoan (China)	1 - 1	(South Korea) FC Seoul	Beijing
19:30 UTC+8	Utaka 20'	Report	Ko Yo-Han 71'	Stadium: Workers Stadium; Attendance: 33,813; Referee: Banjar Al-Dosari (Qatar)

19 March 2014 3	Beijing Guoan (China)	2 - 1	(Australia) Central Coast Mariners	Beijing
19:30 UTC+8	Shao Jiayi 45'; Utaka 63'	Report	Fitzgerald 86' (pen.)	Stadium: Workers Stadium; Attendance: 32,198; Referee: Nagor Amir Noor Mohamed (Malaysia)

1 April 2014 4	Central Coast Mariners (Australia)	1 - 0	(China) Beijing Guoan	Gosford
19:30 UTC+11	Seip 73'	Report		Stadium: Central Coast Stadium; Referee: Hettikamkanamge Perera (Sri Lanka)

16 April 2014 5	Beijing Guoan (China)	2 - 2	(Japan) Sanfrecce Hiroshima	Beijing
19:30 UTC+8	Shao Jiayi 55'; Guerrón 60'	Report	Ishihara 66'; Zhao Hejing 70' (o.g.)	Stadium: Workers Stadium; Attendance: 36,738; Referee: Marai Al Awaji (Saudi Arabia)

23 April 2014 6	FC Seoul (South Korea)	2 - 1	(China) Beijing Guoan	Seoul
19:30 UTC+9	Kang Seung-jo 43'; Yun Ju-tae 57'	Report	Yu Yang 88'	Stadium: Seoul World Cup Stadium; Attendance: 9,562; Referee: Jameel Abdulhusin (Bahrain)
