= 2015 Beijing Guoan F.C. season =

Beijing Guoan
2015 season
- Chairman: Li Shilin
- Manager: Gregorio Manzano
- Stadium: Workers Stadium
- Super League: 4th
- FA Cup: Fourth Round
- AFC Champions League: Round of 16
Home colours	Away colours

The 2015 Beijing Guoan F.C. season was their 12th consecutive season in the Chinese Super League, established in the 2004, and 25th consecutive season in the top flight of Chinese football. They competed in the Chinese Super League, AFC Champions League and Chinese FA Cup.

== Players ==
=== First team squad ===
As of 18 July 2015

Note: Flags indicate national team as defined under FIFA eligibility rules; some limited exceptions apply. Players may hold more than one non-FIFA nationality.

No.	Pos.	Nation	Player
1	GK	(China) CHN	Zhao Shi
2	DF	(China) CHN	Li Yunqiu
3	DF	(China) CHN	Li Lei
4	DF	(China) CHN	Zhou Ting
5	MF	(Croatia) CRO	Darko Matić
7	FW	(China) CHN	Zhang Chiming
8	MF	(China) CHN	Piao Cheng
9	FW	(China) CHN	Tan Tiancheng
10	FW	(Montenegro) MNE	Dejan Damjanović
11	MF	(China) CHN	Song Boxuan
12	GK	(China) CHN	Hou Sen
13	DF	(China) CHN	Xu Yunlong (captain)
14	DF	(China) CHN	Jin Pengxiang
15	GK	(China) CHN	Shi Xiaotian
16	MF	(South Korea) KOR	Ha Dae-Sung

No.	Pos.	Nation	Player
17	MF	(Argentina) ARG	Pablo Batalla
18	DF	(China) CHN	Lang Zheng
19	FW	(China) CHN	Yu Dabao
20	DF	(China) CHN	Zhang Xinxin
22	GK	(China) CHN	Yang Zhi
23	MF	(China) CHN	Chen Zhizhao
24	DF	(China) CHN	Li Hanbo
26	MF	(China) CHN	Wang Hao
27	MF	(China) CHN	Zhang Xizhe
28	DF	(China) CHN	Zhang Chengdong
29	MF	(China) CHN	Shao Jiayi
30	DF	(China) CHN	Lei Tenglong
31	DF	(China) CHN	Zhao Hejing
33	FW	(Brazil) BRA	Kléber
35	MF	(China) CHN	Li Tixiang

=== Reserve squad ===
Note: Flags indicate national team as defined under FIFA eligibility rules; some limited exceptions apply. Players may hold more than one non-FIFA nationality.

No.	Pos.	Nation	Player
21	FW	(Kosovo) KOS	Erton Fejzullahu
36	MF	(China) CHN	Tong Le
37	DF	(China) CHN	Wei Xin
38	MF	(China) CHN	Du Shuaishuai
39	MF	(China) CHN	Li Bowen
40	MF	(China) CHN	Cao Hanchen
41	FW	(China) CHN	Qin Beichen
42	MF	(China) CHN	Fan Yang
43	FW	(China) CHN	Zhu Chaoqing
44	GK	(China) CHN	Zhang Hao
45	DF	(China) CHN	Wang Junming

No.	Pos.	Nation	Player
46	FW	(China) CHN	He Lilong
47	DF	(China) CHN	Zhang Yu
48	FW	(China) CHN	Gong Zheng
49	MF	(China) CHN	Tang Fan
50	DF	(China) CHN	Sheng Pengfei
51	MF	(China) CHN	Wang Hongyu
52	MF	(China) CHN	Zhong Jiyu
53	MF	(China) CHN	Hu Zhuqi
54	DF	(China) CHN	Zhang Shuai
55	MF	(China) CHN	Du Mingyang

=== Out on loan ===
Note: Flags indicate national team as defined under FIFA eligibility rules; some limited exceptions apply. Players may hold more than one non-FIFA nationality.

No.	Pos.	Nation	Player
6	MF	(China) CHN	Zhang Xiaobin (at Chongqing Lifan until 31 December 2015)
34	MF	(China) CHN	Ba Dun (at Meizhou Wuhua until 31 December 2015)
—	DF	(China) CHN	Yang Yun (at Liaoning Whowin until 31 December 2015)

== Club ==
=== Coaching staff ===
Position	Staff
Head coach	(Spain) Gregorio Manzano
Assistant coaches	(China) Xie Feng (Spain) José Manuel González López (Spain) José María Quevedo (Spain) Salvilla
Goalkeeping coach	(China) Li Leilei
Fitness coach	(China) Xue Shen
Team physicians	(China) Shuang Yin (China) Zhang Yang

== Transfers ==
=== Winter ===
In:

No.	Pos.	Nation	Player
3	DF	(China) CHN	Li Lei (from Henan Jianye)
14	DF	(China) CHN	Jin Pengxiang (from Dalian Aerbin)
15	GK	(China) CHN	Shi Xiaotian (loan from Liaoning Whowin)
19	FW	(China) CHN	Yu Dabao (from Dalian Aerbin)
21	FW	(Kosovo) KOS	Erton Fejzullahu (from (Sweden) Djurgårdens IF)
—	FW	(China) CHN	Mao Jianqing (loan return from Qingdao Jonoon)
—	FW	(Nigeria) NGA	Peter Utaka (loan return from Shanghai Shenxin)

Out:

No.	Pos.	Nation	Player
1	GK	(China) CHN	Zhang Sipeng (to Jiangsu Sainty)
3	DF	(China) CHN	Yu Yang (to Guangzhou R&F)
7	DF	(China) CHN	Yang Yun (loan to Liaoning Whowin)
10	MF	(China) CHN	Zhang Xizhe (to (Germany) VfL Wolfsburg)
15	FW	(Nigeria) NGA	Peter Utaka (to (Japan) Shimizu S-Pulse)
21	FW	(Kosovo) KOS	Erton Fejzullahu (loan return to (Sweden) Djurgårdens IF)
36	GK	(China) CHN	Bai Xiaolei (to Harbin Yiteng)
64	MF	(China) CHN	Xu Wu (to Beijing BIT)
—	FW	(China) CHN	Mao Jianqing (to Shijiazhuang Ever Bright)

=== Summer ===
In:

No.	Pos.	Nation	Player
7	FW	(China) CHN	Zhang Chiming (from Chongqing Lifan)
27	MF	(China) CHN	Zhang Xizhe (from (Germany) VfL Wolfsburg)
33	FW	(Brazil) BRA	Kléber (from (Portugal) FC Porto)

Out:

No.	Pos.	Nation	Player
6	MF	(China) CHN	Zhang Xiaobin (loan to Chongqing Lifan)
34	MF	(China) CHN	Ba Dun (loan to Meizhou Wuhua)

== Friendlies ==
=== Pre-season ===
7 January 2014 Friendly	Harbin Yiteng (China)	0–2	Beijing Guoan	Haikou, Hainan
15:30 UTC+8			Wang Hao; Zhang Yu

14 January 2014 Friendly	UD Poblense (Spain)	0–1	Beijing Guoan	Palma, Majorca
19:30 UTC+1			Li Yunqiu 71'

22 January 2014 Friendly	RCD Mallorca (Spain)	3–1	Beijing Guoan	Palma, Majorca
12:00 UTC+1

28 January 2014 Friendly	Barcelona B (Spain)	0–0	Beijing Guoan	Barcelona
11:00 UTC+1

4 February 2014 Friendly	Real Madrid Castilla (Spain)	3–3	Beijing Guoan	Madrid
11:00 UTC+1				Stadium: Alfredo di Stéfano Stadium

12 February 2014 Friendly	Hangzhou Greentown (China)	2–1	Beijing Guoan	Shanghai
18:00 UTC+8	Davy Claude Angan; Feng Gang		Dejan Damjanović

13 February 2014 Friendly	Hangzhou Greentown (China)	1–3	Beijing Guoan	Shanghai
10:30 UTC+8	Anselmo Ramon		Chen Zhizhao; Tan Tiancheng; Wang Hao

== Competitions ==
=== Chinese Super League ===
==== Matches ====
8 March 2015 1	Chongqing Lifan	0–3	Beijing Guoan	Chongqing
15:35 UTC+8			Damjanović 16'; Fejzullahu 47' (pen.); Batalla 86'	Stadium: Chongqing Olympic Sports Center; Referee: Chen Gang

13 March 2015 2	Beijing Guoan	1–0	Henan Jianye	Beijing
19:35 UTC+8	Damjanović 78'			Stadium: Workers Stadium; Referee: Ma Ning

22 March 2015 3	Hangzhou Greentown	1–1	Beijing Guoan	Hangzhou
15:35 UTC+8	Ramon 85'		Fejzullahu 17'	Stadium: Yellow Dragon Sports Center; Referee: Guo Baolong

3 April 2015 4	Beijing Guoan	2–0	Shanghai Shenhua	Beijing
19:35 UTC+8	Matić 75'; Fejzullahu 90'			Stadium: Workers Stadium; Referee: Wang Jin

12 April 2015 5	Shanghai SIPG	1–1	Beijing Guoan	Shanghai
19:45 UTC+8	Hysén 15'		Fejzullahu 79'	Stadium: Shanghai Stadium; Referee: Li Jun

17 April 2015 6	Beijing Guoan	2–2	Guizhou Renhe	Beijing
19:35 UTC+8	Yu 58'; Batalla 83'		Zhu 34'; Hyuri 42'	Stadium: Workers Stadium; Referee: Ma Ning

26 April 2015 7	Shandong Luneng Taishan	3–0	Beijing Guoan	Shandong
19:35 UTC+8	Aloísio 6', 90+5'; Zheng 20'			Stadium: Jinan Olympic Sports Center Stadium; Referee: Wang Di

1 May 2015 8	Beijing Guoan	3–1	Shijiazhuang Ever Bright	Beijing
19:35 UTC+8	Batalla 4', 63'; Shao 76'		Iliev 34'	Stadium: Workers Stadium; Referee: Hei Xiaohu

10 May 2015 9	Changchun Yatai	1–2	Beijing Guoan	Changchun
15:35 UTC+8	Moreno 28'		Zhou 37'; Piao 64'	Stadium: Development Area Stadium; Referee: Chen Gang

16 May 2015 10	Beijing Guoan	2–0	Liaoning Whowin	Beijing
19:35 UTC+8	Damjanović 16', 31'			Stadium: Workers Stadium; Referee: Zhou Gang

23 May 2015 11	Jiangsu Guoxin-Sainty	0–0	Beijing Guoan	Jiangsu
19:35 UTC+8				Stadium: Nanjing Olympic Sports Centre; Referee: Wang Jin

1 June 2015 12	Beijing Guoan	2–1	Shanghai Shenxin	Beijing
19:45 UTC+8	Batalla 49', 88'		Zhang 90'	Stadium: Workers Stadium; Attendance: 33,636; Referee: Hei Xiaohu

4 June 2015 13	Guangzhou R&F	0–0	Beijing Guoan	Guangzhou
19:35 UTC+8				Stadium: Yuexiushan Stadium; Attendance: 9,378; Referee: Wang Di

20 June 2015 14	Beijing Guoan	3–0	Tianjin Teda	Beijing
19:35 UTC+8	Damjanović 16'; Batalla 70'; Shao 87'			Stadium: Workers Stadium; Attendance: 45,238; Referee: Zhou Gang

25 June 2015 15	Guangzhou Evergrande Taobao	0–0	Beijing Guoan	Guangzhou
20:00 UTC+8				Stadium: Tianhe Stadium; Attendance: 49,879; Referee: Ma Ning

28 June 2015 16	Beijing Guoan	2–0	Chongqing Lifan	Beijing
19:35 UTC+8	Batalla 72'; Chen 81'			Stadium: Workers Stadium; Attendance: 35,707; Referee: Hei Xiaohu

4 July 2015 17	Henan Jianye	0–1	Beijing Guoan	Zhengzhou
19:45 UTC+8			Damjanović 56'	Stadium: Zhengzhou Hanghai Stadium; Attendance: 20,999; Referee: Shi Zhenlu

12 July 2015 18	Beijing Guoan	4–0	Hangzhou Greentown	Beijing
19:35 UTC+8	Ha 9'; Damjanović 51', 74'; Fejzullahu 77'			Stadium: Workers Stadium; Attendance: 38,034; Referee: Lin Jun

15 July 2015 19	Shanghai Shenhua	3–1	Beijing Guoan	Shanghai
19:45 UTC+8	Wang 40'; Cahill 58'; Ba 69'		Damjanović 72'	Stadium: Hongkou Football Stadium; Attendance: 25,386; Referee: Hei Xiaohu

20 July 2015 20	Beijing Guoan	0–0	Shanghai SIPG	Beijing
19:35 UTC+8				Stadium: Workers Stadium; Attendance: 48,899; Referee: Wang Jin

26 July 2015 21	Guizhou Renhe	2–1	Beijing Guoan	Guiyang
19:35 UTC+8	Hyuri 19'; Feng 42'		Shao 90+2'	Stadium: Guiyang Olympic Sports Center; Referee: Lin Jun

12 August 2015 22	Beijing Guoan	3–1	Shandong Luneng Taishan	Beijing
19:35 UTC+8	Damjanović 7'; Piao 47'; Yu 85'		Aloísio 54'	Stadium: Workers Stadium; Attendance: 50,867; Referee: Zhou Gang

15 August 2015 23	Shijiazhuang Ever Bright	2–2	Beijing Guoan	Shijiazhuang
19:35 UTC+8	Mulenga 29'; Rondón 90+4'		Damjanović 50'; Batalla 59'	Stadium: Yutong International Sports Center; Referee: Hei Xiaohu

12 September 2015 25	Liaoning Whowin	1–0	Beijing Guoan	Panjin
19:35 UTC+8	Yang 62'			Stadium: Panjin Jinxiu Stadium; Referee: Zhou Gang

16 September 2015 24	Beijing Guoan	3–1	Changchun Yatai	Beijing
19:35 UTC+8	Damjanović 39', 53', 88'		Huszti 66' (pen.)	Stadium: Workers Stadium; Referee: Chen Gang

20 September 2015 26	Beijing Guoan	1–0	Jiangsu Guoxin-Sainty	Beijing
19:35 UTC+8	Zhang 42'			Stadium: Workers Stadium; Referee: Lin Jun

26 September 2015 27	Shanghai Shenxin	0–4	Beijing Guoan	Shanghai
19:45 UTC+8			Batalla 40' (pen.); Damjanović 50', 74'; Yu 85'	Stadium: Yuanshen Sports Centre Stadium; Referee: Shi Zhenlu

17 October 2015 28	Beijing Guoan	2–0	Guangzhou R&F	Beijing
19:35 UTC+8	Yu 17', 51'			Stadium: Workers Stadium; Referee: Wang Di

25 October 2015 29	Tianjin TEDA	4–0	Beijing Guoan	Tianjin
15:00 UTC+8	Zhou 55', 86'; Wágner 67'; Nie 75'			Stadium: Tianjin Olympic Center Stadium; Referee: Ma Ning

31 October 2015 30	Beijing Guoan	0–2	Guangzhou Evergrande Taobao	Beijing
19:35 UTC+8			Goulart 44' (pen.); Paulinho 87'	Stadium: Workers Stadium; Referee: Hiroyuki Kimura (Japan)

=== Chinese FA Cup ===
16 May 2015 Third Round	Shenzhen F.C.	1–2	Beijing Guoan	Shenzhen
20:00 UTC+8	Piao 40' (o.g.)		Damjanović 82'; Fejzullahu 90+1' (pen.)	Stadium: Shenzhen Stadium; Referee: Guo Hao

8 July 2015 Fourth Round	Beijing BG	2–0	Beijing Guoan	Beijing
19:30 UTC+8	Yan Xiangchuang 5'; Danko Lazović 61' (pen.)			Referee: Wang Jin

=== AFC Champions League ===
==== Play-off round ====
17 February 2014 Play-off round	Beijing Guoan (China)	3–0	(Thailand) Bangkok Glass	Beijing
18:00 UTC+8	Song 17'; Batalla 64' (pen.), 73'	Report		Stadium: Workers Stadium; Attendance: 21,017; Referee: Ko Hyung-jin (South Korea)

==== Group stage ====
Group G
Team	Pld	W	D	L	GF	GA	GD	Pts
(China) Beijing Guoan	6	3	2	1	6	3	+3	11
(South Korea) Suwon Samsung Bluewings	6	3	2	1	11	8	+3	11
(Australia) Brisbane Roar	6	2	1	3	7	9	−2	7
(Japan) Urawa Red Diamonds	6	1	1	4	5	9	−4	4

25 February 2015 1	Brisbane Roar (Australia)	0–1	(China) Beijing Guoan	Gold Coast
19:30 UTC+10		Report	Shao 90+3'	Stadium: Robina Stadium; Attendance: 6,851; Referee: Ahmed Al-Kaf (Oman)

4 March 2015 2	Beijing Guoan (China)	1–0	(South Korea) Suwon Samsung Bluewings	Beijing
19:30 UTC+8	Damjanović 65'	Report		Stadium: Workers Stadium; Attendance: 35,567; Referee: Hettikamkanamge Perera (Sri Lanka)

17 March 2015 3	Beijing Guoan (China)	2–0	(Japan) Urawa Red Diamonds	Beijing
19:30 UTC+8	Batalla 78'; Yu 84'	Report		Stadium: Workers Stadium; Attendance: 38,355; Referee: Mohammed Abdulla Hassan Mohamed (United Arab Emirates)

8 April 2015 4	Urawa Red Diamonds (Japan)	1–1	(China) Beijing Guoan	Saitama
19:30 UTC+9	Makino 74'	Report	Yu 33'	Stadium: Saitama Stadium 2002; Attendance: 13,683; Referee: Abdullah Balideh (Qatar)

21 April 2015 5	Beijing Guoan (China)	0–1	(Australia) Brisbane Roar	Beijing
19:30 UTC+8		Report	Kaluđerović 39'	Stadium: Workers Stadium; Attendance: 35,578; Referee: Valentin Kovalenko (Uzbekistan)

5 May 2015 6	Suwon Samsung Bluewings (South Korea)	1–1	(China) Beijing Guoan	Suwon
18:00 UTC+9	Léo 27'	Report	Damjanović 25'	Stadium: Suwon World Cup Stadium; Attendance: 14,380; Referee: Ravshan Irmatov (Uzbekistan)

==== Knock-out stage ====
===== Round of 16 =====
19 May 2015 First leg	Jeonbuk Hyundai Motors (South Korea)	1–1	(China) Beijing Guoan	Jeonju
19:00 UTC+9	Kim 13'	Report	Batalla 85' (pen.)	Stadium: Jeonju World Cup Stadium; Attendance: 12,409; Referee: Valentin Kovalenko (Uzbekistan)

26 May 2015 Second leg	Beijing Guoan (China)	0–1 (1–2 agg.)	(South Korea) Jeonbuk Hyundai Motors	Beijing
19:30 UTC+8		Report	Edu 73'	Stadium: Workers Stadium; Attendance: 43,526; Referee: Mohammed Abdulla Hassan Mohamed (United Arab Emirates)
