= 2012 Beijing Guoan F.C. season =

Beijing Guoan 2012
- Chairman: Li Shilin
- Manager: Jaime Pacheco
- Super League: 3rd
- FA Cup: Quarter-finals
- Top goalscorer: League: Xu Liang (7); All: Xu Liang (8)
- Highest home attendance: 51,795 vs Shanghai Shenhua; 16 March 2012
- Lowest home attendance: 21,909 vs Hangzhou Greentown; 21 July 2012
- Average home league attendance: 36,879
Home colours	Away colours

The 2012 Beijing Guoan F.C. season was their 9th consecutive season in the Chinese Super League, established in 2004 season. They competed in the AFC Champions League and Chinese FA Cup, getting knocked out in both competitions.

== Players ==
=== First team squad ===
As of 5 November 2012

Note: Flags indicate national team as defined under FIFA eligibility rules; some limited exceptions apply. Players may hold more than one non-FIFA nationality.

No.	Pos.	Nation	Player
2	DF	CHN	Zhang Junzhe
3	DF	CHN	Yu Yang
4	MF	CHN	Zhou Ting
5	MF	CRO	Darko Matić
6	MF	CHN	Xu Liang
7	MF	CHN	Wang Changqing
9	FW	CHN	Tan Tiancheng
10	MF	CHN	Zhang Xizhe
11	FW	MLI	Frédéric Kanouté
12	GK	CHN	Hou Sen
13	DF	CHN	Xu Yunlong (captain)
14	DF	CHN	Yang Yun
16	MF	CHN	Zhang Xiaobin
17	FW	CHN	Xu Wu
18	DF	CHN	Lang Zheng
19	MF	CHN	Wang Xiaolong
20	MF	CHN	Zhang Xinxin
21	MF	CHN	Zhu Yifan

No.	Pos.	Nation	Player
22	GK	CHN	Yang Zhi
23	MF	CHN	Jiang Tao
24	FW	CHN	Li Hanbo
25	MF	CHN	Jiao Zhe (on loan from Shandong Luneng)
26	MF	CHN	Wang Hao
27	DF	CHN	Zhang Yonghai
28	MF	CHN	Zhang Jian
29	MF	CHN	Shao Jiayi
30	DF	CHN	Lei Tenglong
32	MF	ECU	Joffre Guerrón
33	FW	CHN	Mao Jianqing
35	MF	CHN	Li Tixiang
36	GK	CHN	Bai Xiaolei
37	FW	BRA	Reinaldo
38	DF	CHN	Meng Yang
39	MF	CHN	Piao Cheng

=== Reserve squad ===
Note: Flags indicate national team as defined under FIFA eligibility rules; some limited exceptions apply. Players may hold more than one non-FIFA nationality.

No.	Pos.	Nation	Player
8	FW	POR	Manú
31	FW	CHN	Hu Qiling
40	DF	SEN	François

=== Out on loan ===
Note: Flags indicate national team as defined under FIFA eligibility rules; some limited exceptions apply. Players may hold more than one non-FIFA nationality.

No.	Pos.	Nation	Player
1	GK	CHN	Zhang Sipeng (on loan to Beijing Yitong Kuche)

== Transfers ==
=== Winter ===
In:

No.	Pos.	Nation	Player
8	MF	POR	Manú (from Legia Warsaw)
15	FW	SRB	Andrija Kaluđerović (from Red Star Belgrade)
16	MF	CHN	Zhang Xiaobin (from Tianjin TEDA)
18	DF	CHN	Lang Zheng (loan return from Nanchang Hengyuan)
25	DF	CHN	Jiao Zhe (loan from Shandong Luneng)
28	FW	CHN	Zhang Jian (from Chongqing Lifan)
29	MF	CHN	Shao Jiayi (from MSV Duisburg)
33	FW	CHN	Mao Jianqing (from Shaanxi Renhe)
36	GK	CHN	Bai Xiaolei (from Nanchang Hengyuan)
37	FW	BRA	Reinaldo (from Al-Raed)
-	GK	CHN	Su Boyang (loan return from Guizhou Zhicheng)
-	DF	CHN	Ma Chongchong (loan return from Sichuan Dujiangyan Symbol)
-	MF	CHN	Cui Yu (loan return from Qingdao QUST)
-	MF	CHN	Yao Shuang (loan return from Beijing Baxy)
-	MF	CHN	Xue Fei (loan return from Beijing Baxy)
-	FW	CHN	Yan Xiangchuang (loan return from Dalian Shide)

Out:

No.	Pos.	Nation	Player
11	FW	CHN	Yan Xiangchuang (to Dalian Shide)
15	FW	HON	Walter Julián Martínez (to Chongqing F.C.)
18	MF	CHN	Lu Jiang (to Hunan Billows)
23	MF	CHN	Ding Haifeng (to Shenzhen NEO Capital)
27	DF	CHN	Zhang Yonghai (loan to Guangdong Sunray Cave)
28	MF	CHN	Wang Haozhi (to Henan Construction)
29	FW	AUS	Joel Griffiths (to Shanghai Shenhua)
32	MF	CHN	Cui Yu (to Beijing Yitong Kuche)
33	DF	CHN	Ma Chongchong (to Henan Construction)
34	MF	CHN	Zhang Zhaohui (to Chongqing Lifan)
37	MF	CHN	Gao Teng (to Qinghai Senke)
41	FW	SEN	Ladji Keita (loan return to S.C. Braga)
-	GK	CHN	Su Boyang (to Hebei Zhongji)
-	MF	CHN	Yao Shuang (to Beijing Baxy)
-	MF	CHN	Xue Fei (to Beijing Baxy)

=== Summer ===
In:

No.	Pos.	Nation	Player
11	FW	MLI	Frédéric Kanouté (from Sevilla)
27	DF	CHN	Zhang Yonghai (loan return from Guangdong Sunray Cave)
32	MF	ECU	Joffre Guerrón (from Atlético Paranaense)

Out:

No.	Pos.	Nation	Player
1	GK	CHN	Zhang Sipeng (loan to Beijing Yitong Kuche)
15	FW	SRB	Andrija Kaluđerović (Racing de Santander)

== Friendlies ==
=== Mid–season ===
24 July 2012 2012 Yingli Cup	Beijing Guoan	0–6	(Germany) Bayern Munich	Beijing, China
11:30 UTC+0		Report	Pizarro 8', 44'; Robben 11'; Müller 74'; Mandžukić 79'; Gómez 80'	Stadium: Workers Stadium; Attendance: 40,000; Referee: Fan Qi (China)

== Competitions ==
=== Chinese Super League ===
==== League table ====
Pos	Team	Pld	W	D	L	GF	GA	GD	Pts	Qualification or relegation
1	Guangzhou Evergrande (C)	30	17	7	6	51	30	+21	58	2013 AFC Champions League group stage (Note: Guizhou Moutai qualified for the 2013 AFC Champions League because league champions Guangzhou Evergrande also won the 2012 Chinese FA Cup.)
2	Jiangsu Sainty	30	14	12	4	49	29	+20	54	2013 AFC Champions League group stage
3	Beijing Guoan	30	14	6	10	34	35	−1	48	2013 AFC Champions League group stage
4	Guizhou Moutai	30	12	9	9	44	33	+11	45	2013 AFC Champions League group stage
5	Dalian Aerbin	30	11	11	8	51	46	+5	44 (Note: Dalian 1–2 Changchun; Changchun 1–2 Dalian)	

Source: Chinese Super League (in Chinese)
Rules for classification: 1) points; 2) goal difference; 3) number of goals scored; 4) head-to-head goals scored; 5) goal difference; 6) goals scored; 7) disciplinary points (1 point for each yellow card, 3 points for each red card). Head-to-Head: Only used at the end of the season when two or more teams need the head-to-head rules to break a tie.
(C) Champions

==== Matches ====
10 March 2012 Week 1	Guangzhou R&F	3–1	Beijing Guoan	Yuexiushan Stadium
Saturday 15:45	Li Zhe 14'; Wu Weian 54'; Davi 90+5'	Report	Darko Matić (yellow card) 31'; François (yellow card) 41'; Zhou Ting (yellow card) 56'; 90+4' Reinaldo	Attendance: 12,252; Referee: Matthew Gillet

16 March 2012 Round 2	Beijing Guoan	3–2	Shanghai Shenhua	Workers Stadium
19:30	Xu Liang (yellow card) 13'; Piao Cheng 44'; Manú 53'; Xu Yunlong (yellow card) 69'; Mao Jianqing 82'; Yu Yang (yellow card) 90'	Summary	Griffiths 62' (pen.); Anelka 66'; Jiang Kun (red card) 90'	Attendance: 51,795; Referee: Guo Baolong

25 March 2012 Round 3	Hangzhou Greentown	1–0	Beijing Guoan	Yellow Dragon Stadium
17:30	Tang Jiashu (yellow card) 23'; Wang Song 55'; Fan Xiaodong (yellow card) 65'	Report		Attendance: 15,137; Referee: Fu Ming

30 March 2012 Round 4	Beijing Guoan	3–1	Tianjin Teda	Workers Stadium
20:30	Reinaldo 51'; Xu Liang 55'; Zhang Xizhe 74'	Report	Šumulikoski (yellow card) 52'; Wang Xinxin 67'; He Yang (yellow card) 80'	Attendance: 38,508; Referee: Joo Kyung-Ho

8 April 2012 Round 5	Dalian Shide	0–0	Beijing Guoan	Jinzhou Stadium
16:30	Xue Ya'nan (yellow card) 84'	Report	Zhou Ting (yellow card) 38'; Reinaldo (yellow card) 48'	Attendance: 10,825; Referee: Yao Qing

13 April 2012 Round 6	Beijing Guoan	2–1	Shandong Luneng	Workers Stadium
20:30	Reinaldo 16'; Xu Liang (yellow card) 32' (goal) 70'; Hou Sen (yellow card) 75'	Report	Gilberto Macena 9'; Fabiano (yellow card) 20'; Ma Xingyu (yellow card) 27'; Yuan Weiwei (yellow card) 62' (yellow-red card) 74'	Attendance: 41,287; Referee: Wong Chi Tang

22 April 2012 Round 7	Liaoning Whowin	0–0	Beijing Guoan	Tiexi New District Sports Center
16:00	Yang Shanping (yellow card) 47'; Grozdanoski (yellow card) 65'; Brandán (yellow card) 85'; Zhang Jingyang (yellow card) 89'	Report	Matić (yellow card) 35'; Yu Yang (yellow card) 60'; Zhang Xiaobin (yellow card) 78'	Attendance: 21,882; Referee: Tao Rancheng

27 April 2012 Round 8	Beijing Guoan	1–0	Shanghai Shenxin	Workers Stadium
20:30	Xu Yunlong 51'	Report	Zhao Zuojun (yellow card) 10'; Anselmo (yellow card) 51'; Salley (yellow card) 89'	Attendance: 36,858; Referee: Ma Ning

6 May 2012 Round 9	Henan Jianye	2–2	Beijing Guoan	Zhengzhou Hanghai Stadium
20:30	Lu Feng 17', 63' (yellow card) 43'; Zhang Lu (yellow card) 22'; Gu Cao (yellow card) 66'; Zi Long (yellow card) 82'	Report	Zhang Xizhe 55'; Reinaldo 79'; Xu Liang (yellow card) 89'	Attendance: 20,192; Referee: Rodney Allen

11 May 2012 Round 10	Beijing Guoan	2–1	Guizhou Renhe	Workers Stadium
20:35	Kaluđerović 71'; Piao Cheng (yellow card) 78' (goal) 83'	Report	Nano (yellow card) 15'; Muslimović 44'; Rafa Jordà (yellow card) 48'; Chen Jie (yellow card) 60'	Attendance: 35,986; Referee: Tao Rancheng

20 May 2012 Round 11	Changchun Yatai	0–1	Beijing Guoan	Development Area Stadium
17:00	Kássio (yellow card) 79'; Liu Xiaodong (yellow card) 85'; Mosquera (yellow card) 88'	Report	Piao Cheng 22'; Shao Jiayi (yellow card) 26'; Jiao Zhe (yellow card) 45'	Attendance: 21,325; Referee: Wang Di

25 May 2012 Round 12	Beijing Guoan	1–0	Dalian Aerbin	Workers Stadium
20:30	Wang Xiaolong 27' (yellow card) 72'	Report	Yu Dabao (yellow card) 11'; Wu Qing (yellow card) 63'	Attendance: 36,871; Referee: Ma Ning

16 June 2012 Round 13	Beijing Guoan	0–0	Qingdao Jonoon	Workers Stadium
20:30	Xu Liang (yellow card) 56'	Report	Li Peng (yellow card) 7' (yellow-red card) 47'; Liu Jian (yellow card) 43'; Yao Jiangshan (yellow card) 51'; Guo Liang (yellow card) 90'	Attendance: 37,769; Referee: Shi Zhenlu

23 June 2012 Round 14	Beijing Guoan	0–1	Jiangsu Sainty	Workers Stadium
20:30	Matić (yellow card) 9'; Jianqing (yellow card) 29'	Report	Bofei (yellow card) 6'; Hang 23'; Jevtić (yellow card) 31'; Ke (yellow card) 69'; Xiaofei (yellow card) 78'; Jiajun (yellow card) 85'; Cheng (yellow card) 90'	Attendance: 38,999; Referee: Zhou Gang

1 July 2012 Round 15	Guangzhou Evergrande	3–2	Beijing Guoan	Tianhe Stadium
20:35	Ning 15'; Linpeng (yellow card) 30'; Muriqui 35'; Sheng (yellow card) 60'; Cléo 68'; Xiaoting (yellow card) 74'	Report	Liang 12', 45+2'; Xiaolong (yellow card) 56'; Yunlong (yellow card) 90'	Attendance: 39,985; Referee: Wang Jin

7 July 2012 Round 16	Beijing Guoan	1–0	Guangzhou R&F	Workers Stadium
20:30	Zhou Ting (yellow card) 58'; Zhang Xinxin (yellow card) 60'; Shao Jiayi 64' (yellow card) 74'; Xu Liang (yellow card) 79'; Xu Yunlong (yellow card) 89'	Report	Zhao Ming (yellow card) 10'; Li Wenbo (yellow card) 42'; Davi (yellow card) 89'

14 July 2012 Round 17	Shanghai Shenhua	3–1	Beijing Guoan	Hongkou Football Stadium
20:45	Song Boxuan 20'; Wang Shouting (yellow card) 28'; Cao Yunding 52'; Xu Qi (yellow card) 72'; Moisés 75'; Dai Lin (yellow card) 77'; Wang Guanyi (yellow card) 85'	Report	Wang Xiaolong (yellow card) 34' (goal) 82' (pen.); Xu Liang (yellow card) 86'	Attendance: 21,135; Referee: Zhong Jun

21 July 2012 Round 18	Beijing Guoan	0–2	Hangzhou Greentown	Workers Stadium
20:30	Wang Xiaolong (yellow card) 51'	Report	Mazola 13'; Liu Bin (yellow card) 32'; Fan Xiaodong (yellow card) 45'; Bari Mamatil (yellow card) 46'; Renatinho 81'	Attendance: 21,909; Referee: Tang Kun

28 July 2012 Round 19	Tianjin Teda	2–1	Beijing Guoan	TEDA Football Stadium
20:30	Mao Biao (yellow card) 34'; Ars 52'; Du Zhenyu (yellow card) 69' (goal) 79'; Nie Tao (yellow card) 72'	Report	Kanouté 78'	Attendance: 35,868; Referee: Hiroyoshi Takayama

4 August 2012 Round 20	Beijing Guoan	1–0	Dalian Shide	Workers Stadium
20:30	Xu Liang 74'; Zhou Ting (yellow card) 79'	Report	Park Dong-Hyuk (yellow card) 26'	Attendance: 33,486; Referee: Wang Di

11 August 2012 Round 21	Shandong Luneng Taishan	4–0	Beijing Guoan	Shandong Provincial Stadium
20:35	Wang Yongpo 8' 39' (pen.) (yellow card) 32'; Wang Qiang (yellow card) 37'; Lü Zheng 80', 87'; Simão Mate Junior (yellow card) 90'	Report	Yu Yang (yellow card) 30'; Xu Liang (yellow card) 42'; Zhang Xinxin (yellow card) 52'; Xu Yunlong (yellow card) 76'	Attendance: 20,656; Referee: Ma Ning

17 August 2012 Round 22	Beijing Guoan	1–1	Liaoning Whowin	Workers Stadium
20:30	Zhang Xinxin (yellow card) 34'; Kaluđerović 75'	Report	Yu Hanchao 53'; Zhang Lu (yellow card) 90+4'	Attendance: 33,639; Referee: Wang Di

25 August 2012 Round 23	Shanghai Shenxin	1–2	Beijing Guoan	Jinshan Sports Centre
20:45	Zou Zhongting 35' (yellow card) 85'; Wang Yun (yellow card) 44'; Jaílton Paraíba (yellow card) 74'	Summary	Xu Liang 9'; Yu Yang (yellow card) 33'; Zhou Ting (yellow card) 43'; Wang Xiaolong 53'	Attendance: 13,774; Referee: Prathan Nasawang

23 September 2012 Round 25	Guizhou Renhe	0–2	Beijing Guoan	Guiyang Olympic Sports Center
16:30	Djulbic (yellow card) 50'; Yang Hao (yellow card) 69'; Muslimović (yellow card) 76'	Summary	Lang Zheng (yellow card) 27'; Matić (yellow card) 31'; Xu Liang 49'; Reinaldo (yellow card) 72' (goal) 74'	Attendance: 20,012; Referee: Tao Rancheng

29 September 2012 Round 26	Beijing Guoan	0–4	Changchun Yatai	Workers Stadium
20:30	Lang Zheng (yellow card) 43'; Zhou Ting (yellow card) 67'	Summary	Weldon (yellow card) 3' (goal) 75'; Cao Tianbao 18'; Zhang Xiaofei (yellow card) 54'; Kássio (yellow card) 78'; Lü Jianjun (yellow card) 81'; Wang Dong 83'; Perea 88'	Attendance: 31,356; Referee: Guo Baolong

3 October 2012 Round 24	Beijing Guoan	3–0	Henan Jianye	Workers Stadium
20:30	Shao Jiayi 25', 70' (yellow card) 68'; Zhang Xizhe 63'	Summary	Zhang Li (yellow card) 24' (yellow-red card) 85'; Son Seung-Joon (yellow card) 33'

6 October 2012 Round 27	Dalian Aerbin	3–1	Beijing Guoan	Jinzhou Stadium
16:30	Keita 36'; Utaka 45+6', 74' (yellow card) 45+2'; Fábio Rochemback (yellow card) 56'; Hu Zhaojun (yellow card) 88'	Summary	Piao Cheng (yellow card) 45+2'; Xu Yunlong (yellow card) 54'; Wang Hongyou 86' (o.g.); Yang Yun (yellow card) 88'	Attendance: 21,152; Referee: Zhong Jun

20 October 2012 Round 28	Qingdao Jonoon	0–2	Beijing Guoan	Qingdao Tiantai Stadium
16:30	Mou Pengfei (yellow card) 9'; Melkam (yellow card) 25'; Ibrahimov (yellow card) 30'; Yao Jiangshan (yellow card) 68'; Zhu Jianrong (yellow card) 81'		Joffre Guerrón 4' (yellow card) 72'; Zhou Ting (yellow card) 22'; Wang Changqing 26'; Jiang Kun (red card) 84'	Attendance: 12,816; Referee: Tao Rancheng

27 October 2012 Round 29	Jiangsu Sainty	0–0	Beijing Guoan	Nanjing Olympic Sports Center
16:30	Liu Jianye (yellow card) 71'; Eleílson (red card) 80'		Li Tixiang (yellow card) 45'; Yang Zhi (footballer) (yellow card) 84'

3 November 2012 Round 30	Beijing Guoan	1–0	Guangzhou Evergrande	Workers Stadium
15:30	Lang Zheng (yellow card) 39'; Zhang Xizhe 90+4'		Feng Xiaoting (yellow card) 34'; Cléo (yellow card) 78'	Attendance: 38,832; Referee: Adam Kersey

=== Chinese FA Cup ===
18 July 2012 Fourth round	Beijing Guoan	6–0	Qingdao Jonoon	Beijing
12:30 CST	Kanouté 3', 35'; Wang Xiaolong 14', 22' (pen.); Guerrón 19'; Liu Yangyang 64' (o.g.)	Report		Stadium: Workers Stadium; Attendance: 27,526; Referee: Wang Di

1 August 2012 Quarter-final	Beijing Guoan	3–4	Guizhou Renhe	Beijing
12:30 CST	Xu Liang 12', 55'; Guerrón 92'		Zhang Chenglin 22'; Rafa Jordà 25'; Qu Bo 43'; Djulbic 83'	Stadium: Workers Stadium; Attendance: 28,668; Referee: Zhong Jun

=== AFC Champions League ===
==== Group stage ====
Pos	Team	Pld	W	D	L	GF	GA	GD	Pts	Qualification	ULS	TOK	BBR	BEG
1	(South Korea) Ulsan Hyundai	6	4	2	0	11	7	+4	14	Advance to knockout stage	—	1–0	1–1	2–1
2	(Japan) FC Tokyo	6	3	2	1	12	6	+6	11	Advance to knockout stage	2–2	—	4–2	3–0
3	(Australia) Brisbane Roar	6	0	3	3	6	11	−5	3 (Note: Brisbane Roar and Beijing Guoan are tied on their head-to-head record (2 pts, 0 GD, 2 GF), overall goal difference and overall goals scored, and so are ranked by their fair play record (Brisbane Roar: 12 pts; Beijing Guoan: 18 pts).)		1–2	0–2	—	1–1
4	(China) Beijing Guoan	6	0	3	3	6	11	−5	3		2–3	1–1	1–1	—

Source: WorldFootball.net
Notes:

6 March 2012 Group stage	Ulsan Hyundai (South Korea)	2–1	(China) Beijing Guoan	Ulsan Munsu Football Stadium, Ulsan
19:30 UTC+09:00	Kim Shin-Wook 26'; Go Seul-Ki 34'	Report	Piao Cheng 51'	Attendance: 1,515; Referee: Mohamed Al Zarooni (UAE)

20 March 2012 Group stage	Beijing Guoan (China)	1–1	(Australia) Brisbane Roar	Workers Stadium, Beijing
19:30 UTC+08:00	Piao Cheng 7'	Report	Nichols 20'	Attendance: 41,000; Referee: Abdulrahman Abdou (Qatar)

4 April 2012 Group stage	Beijing Guoan (China)	1–1	(Japan) FC Tokyo	Workers Stadium, Beijing
20:00 UTC+08:00	Wang Xiaolong 11' (pen.); Xu Yunlong (yellow card) 37'; Yu Yang (yellow card) 39'	Report	Takahashi (yellow card) 9'; Hasegawa 44' (yellow card) 87'	Attendance: 31,256; Referee: Saeid Mozaffarizadeh (Iran)

17 April 2012 Group stage	FC Tokyo (Japan)	3–0	(China) Beijing Guoan	Ajinomoto Stadium, Tokyo
19:30 UTC+09:00	Watanabe 7'; Otake 45+1' (yellow card) 82'; Yazawa 58'; Tanabe (yellow card) 62'	Report	Wang Xiaolong (yellow card) 21'; Matić (yellow card) 35'; Zhang Xiaobin (yellow card) 90+3'	Attendance: 9,537; Referee: Ali Abdulnabi (Bahrain)

2 May 2012 Group stage	Beijing Guoan (China)	2–3	(South Korea) Ulsan Hyundai	Workers Stadium, Beijing
19:30 UTC+08:00	Zhu Yifan (yellow card) 11'; Zhang Xizhe 47'; Reinaldo (red card) 87'; Shao Jiayi 90+1'	Report	Kim Shin-Wook 17'; Kim Seung-Yong 20'; Maranhão 79'; Ienaga (yellow card) 85'	Attendance: 21,692; Referee: Abdullah Al Hilali (Oman)

16 May 2012 Group stage	Brisbane Roar (Australia)	1–1	(China) Beijing Guoan	Suncorp Stadium, Brisbane
19:30 UTC+10:00	Berisha 15' (yellow card) 40'; Nichols (yellow card) 32'; Franjic (yellow card) 41'	Report	Xu Wu (yellow card) 7'; Li Hanbo 34'; Jiao Zhe (yellow card) 41'; Zhang Xiaobin (yellow card) 65'	Attendance: 5,615; Referee: Ali Hamad Madhad Saif Al Badwawi (UAE)
