= Zhang Xiaobin =

Zhang Xiaobin may refer to:

- Zhang Xiaobin (footballer, born 1985) (张晓彬), Chinese footballer who plays for Beijing Guoan F.C.
- Zhang Xiaobin (footballer, born 1993) (张晓彬), Chinese footballer who plays for Jiangsu Sainty F.C.
