= Piao Cheng =

Chinese footballer (born 1989)

Piao Cheng 朴成 박성
Personal information
- Full name: Piao Cheng
- Date of birth: 21 August 1989 (age 37)
- Place of birth: Longjing, Jilin, China
- Height: 1.76 m (5 ft 9 1/2 in)
- Position: Midfielder

Youth career
- 2003–2007: Yanbian FC

Senior career*
Years	Team	Apps	(Gls)
2007–2010	Yanbian FC	76	(12)
2011–2023	Beijing Guoan	221	(15)
Total		298	(27)

International career
2008	China U-20		
2009–2011	China U-23		
2015–2018	China	5	(0)
- * Club domestic league appearances and goals

Piao Cheng
- Simplified Chinese: 朴成
Transcriptions
Standard Mandarin
- Hanyu Pinyin: Piáo Chéng
- IPA: [pʰjǎʊ ʈʂʰə̌ŋ]

Chinese Korean name
- Chosŏn'gŭl: 박성
Transcriptions
- Revised Romanization: Bak Seong
- McCune–Reischauer: Pak Sŏng

Piao Cheng (Chinese: 朴成; Korean: 박성; born 21 August 1989) is a Chinese former professional footballer who played as a midfielder, most notably for Beijing Guoan, as well as for the China national team.

== Club career ==
Piao Cheng started his football career with second tier side Yanbian FC and was promoted to their first team in 2007 where he would soon score his first goal for them on 18 August 2007 in a 2-1 win against Shanghai Stars and scored the winning goal which was his first for the club. He would then establish himself as a regular within the squad and soon received a call-up to the Chinese under-20 national team in July 2008. He then started to attract the interests of several top tier Chinese sides. On 25 February 2011, Piao transferred to Chinese Super League side Beijing Guoan for 3 million yuan after impressing many at Yanbian.

At Beijing he would go on to make his debut in a league game on 3 April 2011 against Jiangsu Sainty in a 2-0 victory. Chi would establish himself as an integral member of the team and helped guide the club to a runners-up position at the end of the 2011 Chinese Super League season. Another runners-up position would follow in the 2014 Chinese Super League season before he won his first piece of silverware with the 2018 Chinese FA Cup against Shandong Luneng Taishan.

== International career ==
Piao would be called up to the Chinese under-20 national team that took part in the 2008 AFC U-19 Championship. Throughout the tournament, he would play in three games and scored one goal as China were knocked out in the quarterfinals on 8 November 2008 by Uzbekistan in a penalty shootout. Piao made his debut for the Chinese national team on 31 March 2015 in a 1-1 draw against Tunisia.

== Career statistics ==
=== Club statistics ===
Appearances and goals by club, season and competition
Club	Season	League			National Cup		Continental		Other		Total	
Club	Season	Division	Apps	Goals	Apps	Goals	Apps	Goals	Apps	Goals	Apps	Goals
Yanbian FC	2007	China League One	20	1	-		-		-		20	1
Yanbian FC	2008	China League One	13	1	-		-		-		13	1
Yanbian FC	2009	China League One	22	5	-		-		-		22	5
Yanbian FC	2010	China League One	21	5	-		-		-		21	5
Yanbian FC	Total		76	12	0	0	0	0	0	0	76	12
Beijing Guoan	2011	Chinese Super League	21	0	2	0	-		-		23	0
Beijing Guoan	2012	Chinese Super League	27	3	2	0	5	2	-		34	5
Beijing Guoan	2013	Chinese Super League	28	0	3	0	8	1	-		39	1
Beijing Guoan	2014	Chinese Super League	18	2	3	0	7	0	-		28	2
Beijing Guoan	2015	Chinese Super League	18	2	2	0	7	0	-		27	2
Beijing Guoan	2016	Chinese Super League	19	1	2	0	-		-		21	1
Beijing Guoan	2017	Chinese Super League	13	0	1	0	-		-		14	0
Beijing Guoan	2018	Chinese Super League	27	3	7	0	-		-		34	3
Beijing Guoan	2019	Chinese Super League	18	2	1	0	2	0	1 (Note: Appearances in Chinese FA Super Cup)	0	22	2
Beijing Guoan	2020	Chinese Super League	2	1	0	0	1	0	-		3	1
Beijing Guoan	2021	Chinese Super League	15	0	0	0	0	0	-		15	0
Beijing Guoan	2022	Chinese Super League	8	0	0	0	-		-		8	0
Beijing Guoan	2023	Chinese Super League	7	1	1	0	-		-		8	1
Beijing Guoan	Total		221	15	24	0	30	3	1	0	276	18
Total			297	27	24	0	30	3	1	0	352	30

=== International statistics ===
National team
Year	Apps	Goals
2015	1	0
2016	0	0
2017	0	0
2018	4	0
Total	5	0

== Honours ==
=== Club ===
Beijing Guoan

- Chinese FA Cup: 2018
