= Slobodan Kuljanin =

Bosnian Serb footballer and coach (1953–2019)

Personal information
- Full name: Slobodan Kuljanin
- Date of birth: 28 November 1953
- Place of birth: Konjic, FPR Yugoslavia
- Date of death: 22 February 2019 (aged 65)
- Place of death: Belgrade, Serbia
- Position: Defender

Youth career
- Velež Mostar

Senior career*
Years	Team	Apps	(Gls)
- Velež Mostar
1977–1980	Borac Banja Luka	51	(2)
1981–1982	Kozara Gradiška	17	(0)
Total		68	(2)

Managerial career
- 2010–2012: Partizan (assistant)
- 2012: Dalian Aerbin (assistant)
- 2013: Beijing Guoan (assistant)
- 2014: Maccabi Haifa (assistant)
- * Club domestic league appearances and goals

Slobodan Kuljanin (Serbian Cyrillic: Слободан Куљанин, Serbian pronunciation: [slobǒdan kûːʎanin]; 28 November 1953 – 22 February 2019) was a Bosnian Serb footballer and coach.

Born in Konjic, Kuljanin played for Velež Mostar, Borac Banja Luka, Rudar Prijedor and Kozara Gradiška. After his playing career he had a lengthy spell as academy coach at OFK Beograd.

He died on 22 February 2019 after a short but severe illness. He was a long-time assistant coach to Aleksandar Stanojević.

== Honours ==
=== As assistant coach ===
Partizan

- Serbian SuperLiga: 2009–10, 2010–11
- Serbian Cup: 2010–11
