= Panjin Jinxiu Stadium =

Sports venue in Panjin, China

Coordinates: 41°06′37″N 122°04′18″E

Panjin Red Beach Sports Centre Jinxiu Stadium (Chinese: 盘锦红海滩体育中心锦绣体育场) or simply Panjin Jinxiu Stadium (Chinese: 盘锦锦绣体育场) is a multi-purpose stadium in Panjin, China. It is currently used mostly for association football matches. The stadium holds 35,600 people. Liaoning Whowin F.C. are the tenants.
