= Zhao Shi (footballer) =

Chinese footballer

Zhao Shi 赵石
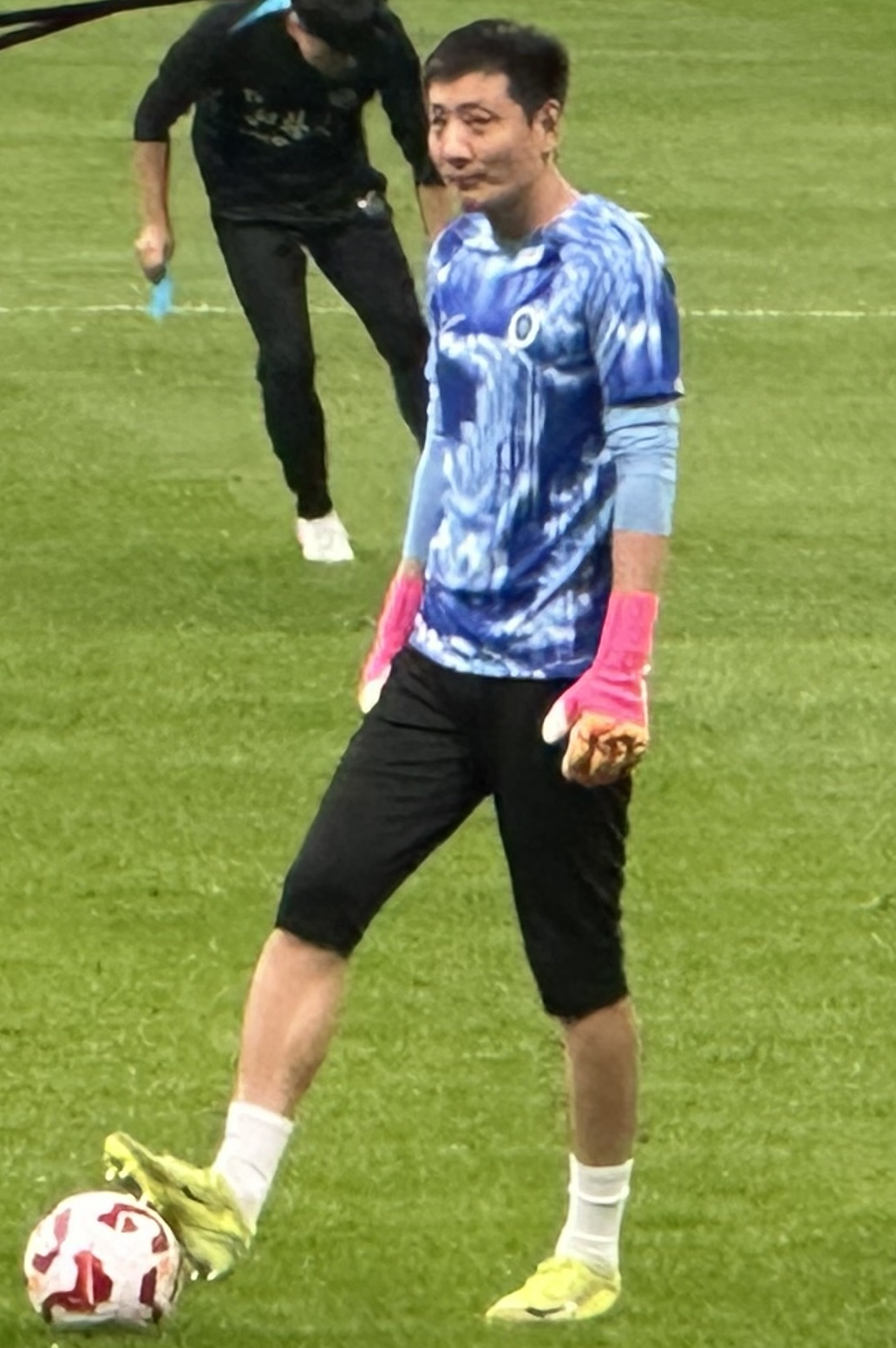
- Zhao Shi in May 2025

Personal information
- Full name: Zhao Shi
- Date of birth: 16 March 1993 (age 33)
- Place of birth: Handan, Hebei, China
- Height: 1.85 m (6 ft 1 in)
- Position: Goalkeeper

Team information
- Current team: Shaanxi Union
- Number: 16

Senior career*
Years	Team	Apps	(Gls)
2012	Beijing Youth	15	(0)
2015–2016	Beijing Guoan	0	(0)
2017–2021	Qingdao FC	55	(0)
2022–2025	Shenzhen Peng City	48	(0)
2026–	Shaanxi Union	0	(0)
- * Club domestic league appearances and goals as of 28 August 2025

Zhao Shi (Chinese: 赵石; born 16 March 1993) is a Chinese professional footballer who plays as a goalkeeper for China League One club Shaanxi Union.

== Club career ==
Zhao was first called up to Guoan's first team on 17 February 2015 for an AFC Champions League home game, which was won 2–0 against Bangkok Glass, however he experienced no game time and finished the game as an unused substitute. Throughout the season he did not to make any appearances for Beijing and this continued the following season. On 3 January 2017, Zhao moved to League One side Qingdao Huanghai.

== Career statistics ==
Statistics accurate as of match played 2 November 2024.

Appearances and goals by club, season and competition
Club	Season	League			National Cup		Continental		Other		Total	
Club	Season	Division	Apps	Goals	Apps	Goals	Apps	Goals	Apps	Goals	Apps	Goals
Beijing Youth	2012	China League Two	15	0	-		-		-		15	0
Beijing Guoan	2015	Chinese Super League	0	0	0	0	0	0	-		0	0
Beijing Guoan	2016	Chinese Super League	0	0	0	0	-		-		0	0
Beijing Guoan	Total		0	0	0	0	0	0	0	0	0	0
Qingdao Huanghai	2017	China League One	2	0	2	0	-		-		4	0
Qingdao Huanghai	2018	China League One	27	0	0	0	-		-		27	0
Qingdao Huanghai	2019	China League One	13	0	0	0	-		-		13	0
Qingdao Huanghai	2020	Chinese Super League	7	0	1	0	-		-		8	0
Qingdao Huanghai	2021	Chinese Super League	6	0	1	0	-		-		7	0
Qingdao Huanghai	Total		55	0	4	0	0	0	0	0	59	0
Sichuan Jiuniu/ Shenzhen Peng City	2022	China League One	10	0	1	0	-		-		11	0
Sichuan Jiuniu/ Shenzhen Peng City	2023	China League One	27	0	0	0	-		-		27	0
Sichuan Jiuniu/ Shenzhen Peng City	2024	Chinese Super League	7	0	0	0	-		-		7	0
Sichuan Jiuniu/ Shenzhen Peng City	Total		44	0	1	0	0	0	0	0	45	0
Career total			114	0	5	0	0	0	0	0	119	0

== Honours ==
=== Club ===
Qingdao Huanghai

- China League One: 2019
