= Zhang Junzhe =

Chinese association football player

Personal information
- Date of birth: 20 February 1991 (age 35)
- Place of birth: Datong, Shanxi, China
- Height: 1.82 m (5 ft 11 1/2 in)
- Position: Defender

Team information
- Current team: Shanxi Chongde Ronghai
- Number: 60

Senior career*
Years	Team	Apps	(Gls)
2010–2014	Beijing Guoan	0	(0)
2013	→ Shenyang Dongjin (loan)	6	(1)
2015	Changchun Shenhua		
2016–2018	Beijing Enterprises Group	23	(0)
2019–2022	Hebei FC	47	(0)
2023	Changchun Shenhua		
2024	Shijiazhuang Gongfu	2	(0)
2024	→ Jiangxi Lushan (loan)	14	(0)
2025	Guangdong Mingtu	26	(3)
2026	Lanzhou Longyuan Athletic	11	(1)
2026–	Shanxi Chongde Ronghai	4	(1)
- * Club domestic league appearances and goals as of 17:14, 26 July 2026 (UTC)

Zhang Junzhe (simplified Chinese: 张俊哲; traditional Chinese: 張俊哲; pinyin: Zhāng Jùnzhé; born 20 February 1991) is a Chinese footballer currently playing as a defender for Shanxi Chongde Ronghai.

== Club career ==
Zhang Junzhe began his football career with top-tier side Beijing Guoan and was promoted to their senior team in the 2010 league season. He would struggle to gain any competitive playing time and was loaned out to third tier football club Shenyang Dongjin in the 2013 league season. Upon his return to Beijing Guoan, Zhang still couldn't break into the senior team and was released from the club. He would join fourth tier club Changchun Shenhua and play in the Chinese Football Association Amateur League in the 2015 league season. In the 2016 league season second-tier club Beijing Enterprises Group took on Zhang as a free agent. On 21 February 2019 he joined top-tier club Hebei China Fortune.

== Career statistics ==
As of 26 July 2026.

Appearances and goals by club, season and competition
Club	Season	League			National Cup		Continental		Other		Total	
Club	Season	Division	Apps	Goals	Apps	Goals	Apps	Goals	Apps	Goals	Apps	Goals
Beijing Guoan	2010	Chinese Super League	0	0	0	0	0	0	–		0	0
Beijing Guoan	2011	Chinese Super League	0	0	0	0	–		–		0	0
Beijing Guoan	2012	Chinese Super League	0	0	0	0	0	0	–		0	0
Beijing Guoan	2014	Chinese Super League	0	0	0	0	0	0	–		0	0
Beijing Guoan	Total		0	0	0	0	0	0	0	0	0	0
Shenyang Dongjin (loan)	2013	China League Two	6	1	0	0	–		–		6	1
Changchun Shenhua	2015	CFA Amateur League			–		–		–			
Beijing Enterprises Group	2016	China League One	2	0	2	0	–		–		4	0
Beijing Enterprises Group	2017	China League One	9	0	1	0	–		–		10	0
Beijing Enterprises Group	2018	China League One	12	0	1	0	–		–		13	0
Beijing Enterprises Group	Total		23	0	4	0	0	0	0	0	27	0
Hebei China Fortune	2019	Chinese Super League	13	0	1	0	–		–		14	0
Hebei China Fortune	2020	Chinese Super League	5	0	1	0	–		–		6	0
Hebei China Fortune	2021	Chinese Super League	1	0	1	0	–		–		2	0
Hebei China Fortune	2022	Chinese Super League	27	0	0	0	–		–		27	0
Hebei China Fortune	Total		47	0	3	0	0	0	0	0	50	0
Changchun Shenhua	2023	Chinese Champions League			–		–		–			
Shijiazhuang Gongfu	2024	China League One	2	0	1	0	–		–		3	0
Jiangxi Lushan (loan)	2024	China League One	14	0	0	0	–		–		14	0
Guangdong Mingtu	2025	China League Two	26	3	2	0	–		–		28	3
Lanzhou Longyuan Athletic	2026	China League Two	11	1	3	1	–		–		14	2
Shanxi Chongde Ronghai	2026	China League Two	4	1	0	0	–		–		4	1
Career total			133	6	13	1	0	0	0	0	146	7
