= Jiao Zhe =

Chinese footballer

Jiao Zhe 矫喆
Personal information
- Full name: Jiao Zhe
- Date of birth: 21 August 1981 (age 45)
- Place of birth: Jinan, Shandong, China
- Height: 1.82 m (6 ft 0 in)
- Position: Defender

Senior career*
Years	Team	Apps	(Gls)
1999–2012	Shandong Luneng	208	(2)
2011	→ Hangzhou Greentown (loan)	26	(0)
2012	→ Beijing Guoan (loan)	2	(0)
2013–2014	Qingdao Jonoon	11	(0)
2014	→ Taiyuan Zhongyou Jiayi (loan)	10	(0)
2015–2016	Nei Mongol Zhongyou	46	(0)
2017–2019	Shijiazhuang Ever Bright	56	(0)
2020	Beijing Renhe	0	(0)

International career^{‡}
2005–2009	China	5	(0)

Managerial career
- 2021-2022: Shandong Taishan (fitness coach)
Medal record
Representing China
Men's football
EAFF Championship
Gold medal – first place	2005 South Korea	Team
- * Club domestic league appearances and goals as of 31 December 2019 ‡ National team caps and goals as of 5 November 2012

Jiao Zhe (simplified Chinese: 矫喆; traditional Chinese: 矯喆; pinyin: Jiǎo Zhé) is a retired Chinese football player who played as a right-back.

On 10 September 2024, Chinese Football Association announced that Jiao was banned from football-related activities for lifetime for involving in match-fixing.

== Club career ==
Jiao Zhe started his professional football career in 1999 for top tier side Shandong Luneng after he graduated from their youth team. In the 2001 league season he continued to progress in establishing himself for the Shandong Luneng team where he was firmly established as their first choice right-back by playing in 17 league games, which was followed by a further 28 league games in the 2002 league season. In the 2004 league season Jiao Zhe would continue to play a major part in the Shandong Luneng team and under new manager Ljubiša Tumbaković Jiao would even score his first league goal on 15 September 2004 when he scored the equalising goal against Beijing Guoan in a 1–1 draw. By the end of the league season Jiao Zhe would win his first piece of silverware when he help win the 2004 Chinese FA Cup with Shandong Luneng.

== International career ==
On 19 June 2005, Jiao Zhe would make his international debut against Costa Rica in a 2–2 draw coming on as a subsistute for Wei Xin in a friendly match. After making several further friendly appearances Jiao Zhe would play in his first competitive game against Vietnam in an Asian Cup Qualifier on 21 January 2009 in a 6–1 win.

== Career statistics ==
As of 31 December 2019.

Appearances and goals by club, season and competition
Club	Season	League			National Cup		League Cup		Continental		Other		Total	
Club	Season	Division	Apps	Goals	Apps	Goals	Apps	Goals	Apps	Goals	Apps	Goals	Apps	Goals
Shandong Luneng	1999	Jia-A League	0	0	0	0	-		-		-		0	0
Shandong Luneng	2000	Jia-A League	1	0	?	?	-		?	?	-		1	0
Shandong Luneng	2001	Jia-A League	17	0	0	0	-		-		-		17	0
Shandong Luneng	2002	Jia-A League	28	0	0	0	-		-		-		28	0
Shandong Luneng	2003	Jia-A League	21	0	2	0	-		-		-		23	0
Shandong Luneng	2004	Chinese Super League	18	1	4	0	1	0	-		-		23	1
Shandong Luneng	2005	Chinese Super League	25	0	6	0	1	0	?	?	-		32	0
Shandong Luneng	2006	Chinese Super League	25	0	5	0	-		-		-		30	0
Shandong Luneng	2007	Chinese Super League	17	1	-		-		2	0	-		19	1
Shandong Luneng	2008	Chinese Super League	28	0	-		-		-		-		28	0
Shandong Luneng	2009	Chinese Super League	24	0	-		-		3	0	-		27	0
Shandong Luneng	2010	Chinese Super League	4	0	-		-		2	0	-		6	0
Shandong Luneng	Total		208	2	17	0	2	0	7	0	0	0	234	2
Hangzhou Greentown (loan)	2011	Chinese Super League	26	0	1	0	-		3	0	-		30	0
Beijing Guoan (loan)	2012	Chinese Super League	2	0	0	0	-		4	0	-		6	0
Qingdao Jonoon	2013	Chinese Super League	7	0	0	0	-		-		-		7	0
Qingdao Jonoon	2014	China League One	4	0	0	0	-		-		-		4	0
Qingdao Jonoon	Total		11	0	0	0	0	0	0	0	0	0	11	0
Taiyuan Zhongyou Jiayi (loan)	2014	China League Two	10	0	0	0	-		-		-		10	0
Nei Mongol Zhongyou	2015	China League One	23	0	1	0	-		-		-		24	0
Nei Mongol Zhongyou	2016	China League One	23	0	2	0	-		-		-		25	0
Nei Mongol Zhongyou	Total		46	0	3	0	0	0	0	0	0	0	49	0
Shijiazhuang Ever Bright	2017	China League One	22	0	1	0	-		-		-		23	0
Shijiazhuang Ever Bright	2018	China League One	20	0	0	0	-		-		-		20	0
Shijiazhuang Ever Bright	2019	China League One	14	0	0	0	-		-		-		14	0
Shijiazhuang Ever Bright	Total		56	0	1	0	0	0	0	0	0	0	57	0
Career total			359	2	22	0	2	0	14	0	0	0	397	2

== Honours ==
Shandong Luneng

- Chinese Super League: 2006, 2008, 2010
- Chinese FA Cup: 2004, 2006
- Chinese Super League Cup: 2004
