= Tong Le =

Chinese footballer

Personal information
- Date of birth: 29 April 1993 (age 33)
- Place of birth: Nanjing, Jiangsu, China
- Height: 1.74 m (5 ft 9 in)
- Position: Midfielder

Youth career
- –2015: Beijing Guoan
- 2017–2019: Aves

Senior career*
Years	Team	Apps	(Gls)
2012	Beijing Youth	20	(2)
2013-2014	Beijing Guoan	0	(0)
2018-2019	Aves	1	(0)
2020-2025	Wuxi Wugo	99	(11)
- * Club domestic league appearances and goals as of 18:54, 19 May 2024 (UTC)

Tong Le (simplified Chinese: 同乐; traditional Chinese: 同樂; pinyin: Tóng Lè; born 29 April 1993) is a Chinese retired footballer who played as a midfielder.

== Career statistics ==
=== Club ===
As of 19 May 2024.

Club	Season	League			National Cup		League Cup		Continental		Total	
Club	Season	Division	Apps	Goals	Apps	Goals	Apps	Goals	Apps	Goals	Apps	Goals
Beijing Youth	2012	China League Two	20	2	–		–		–		20	2
Beijing Guoan	2013	Chinese Super League	0	0	0	0	–		0	0	0	0
Beijing Guoan	2014	Chinese Super League	0	0	0	0	–		0	0	0	0
Beijing Guoan	Total		0	0	0	0	0	0	0	0	0	0
Aves	2018–19	Primeira Liga	1	0	1 (Note: Appearances in the Taça de Portugal)	0	0	0	–		2	0
Nanjing Balanta	2019	Chinese Champions League	–		–		–		–		–	
Wuxi Wugo	2021	China League Two	18	1	2	0	–		–		20	1
Wuxi Wugo	2022	China League Two	14	0	–		–		–		14	0
Wuxi Wugo	2023	China League One	26	2	1	0	–		–		27	2
Wuxi Wugo	2024	China League One	6	0	1	0	–		–		7	0
Wuxi Wugo	Total		64	3	4	0	0	0	0	0	68	3
Career total			85	5	5	0	0	0	0	0	90	5
