= Wang Hao (footballer, born 1989) =

Chinese footballer

Wang Hao 王皓
Personal information
- Full name: Wang Hao
- Date of birth: 10 February 1989 (age 37)
- Place of birth: Luoyang, Henan, China
- Height: 1.77 m (5 ft 9 1/2 in)
- Position: Midfielder

Youth career
- 2001–2009: Beijing Guoan

Senior career*
Years	Team	Apps	(Gls)
2009–2015	Beijing Guoan	18	(2)
2010	→ Beijing Guoan Talent (loan)	30	(6)
- * Club domestic league appearances and goals as of 1 November 2015

Wang Hao (Chinese: 王皓; pinyin: Wáng Hào; born 10 February 1989) is a Chinese football player.

== Club career ==
Wang started his football career in 2009 when he was promoted to Beijing Guoan's first team squad. The following season in an attempt to gain more playing time Wang was loaned to Beijing Guoan's satellite team Beijing Guoan Talent, which would play as a foreign team in Singapore's S.League in 2010. He made his senior debut in a 3–1 away victory against Geylang United on 12 March 2010 and scored his senior goal in a 4–1 home victory against Home United 7 days later. Wang made 30 appearances in scored 6 goals in the 2010 S.League season.

Wang returned to Beijing Guoan in 2011. On 18 July 2012, he made his debut for Beijing Guoan on the fourth round of 2012 Chinese FA Cup which Beijing beat Qingdao Jonoon 6–0 at Workers Stadium, coming on as a substitute for Frédéric Kanouté in the 60th minute. He made his Super League debut on 8 March 2013, in the first round of 2013 Chinese Super League season, which Beijing Guoan beat Shanghai East Asia 4–1, coming on as a substitute for Wang Xiaolong in the 84th minute. Wang was released by Beijing at the end of 2015 season.

== Career statistics ==
Statistics accurate as of match played 1 November 2015

Appearances and goals by club, season and competition
Club	Season	League			National Cup		League Cup		Continental		Total	
Club	Season	Division	Apps	Goals	Apps	Goals	Apps	Goals	Apps	Goals	Apps	Goals
Beijing Guoan	2009	Chinese Super League	0	0	-		-		0	0	0	0
Beijing Guoan	2011	Chinese Super League	0	0	0	0	-		-		0	0
Beijing Guoan	2012	Chinese Super League	0	0	1	0	-		0	0	1	0
Beijing Guoan	2013	Chinese Super League	16	2	4	1	-		3	0	23	3
Beijing Guoan	2014	Chinese Super League	1	0	0	0	-		2	0	3	0
Beijing Guoan	2015	Chinese Super League	1	0	0	0	-		0	0	1	0
Beijing Guoan	Total		18	2	5	1	0	0	5	0	28	3
Beijing Guoan Talent (loan)	2010	S. League	30	6	1	0	0	0	-		31	6
Career total			48	8	6	1	0	0	5	0	59	9
