= Li Hanbo =

Chinese footballer

Li Hanbo 李翰博
Personal information
- Full name: Li Hanbo
- Date of birth: 26 January 1991 (age 35)
- Place of birth: Shenyang, Liaoning, China
- Height: 1.70 m (5 ft 7 in)
- Position: Midfielder

Youth career
- 2006–2010: Beijing Guoan

Senior career*
Years	Team	Apps	(Gls)
2011–2020	Beijing Guoan	14	(0)
2023–2024	Guangxi Hengchen	12	(0)
- * Club domestic league appearances and goals as of 4 November 2017

Li Hanbo (Chinese: 李翰博; pinyin: Lǐ Hànbó; born 26 January 1991) is a Chinese football player.

== Club career ==
Li started his football career in 2011 when he was promoted to Beijing Guoan's first team squad by Jaime Pacheco. On 16 May 2012, he made his senior debut in the last round of 2012 AFC Champions League group stage which Beijing tied with Brisbane Roar 1–1. He scored his first senior goal assisted by Shao Jiayi in the 34th minute, which was selected by the fans as AFC goal of year 2012 in December 2012.

== Career statistics ==
Statistics accurate as of match played 4 November 2017.

Club performance			League		Cup		League Cup		Continental		Total	
Season	Club	League	Apps	Goals	Apps	Goals	Apps	Goals	Apps	Goals	Apps	Goals
China PR			League		FA Cup		CSL Cup		Asia		Total	
2011	Beijing Guoan	Chinese Super League	0	0	0	0	-		-		0	0
2012	Beijing Guoan	Chinese Super League	0	0	0	0	-		1	1	1	1
2013	Beijing Guoan	Chinese Super League	1	0	0	0	-		0	0	1	0
2014	Beijing Guoan	Chinese Super League	4	0	1	0	-		0	0	5	0
2015	Beijing Guoan	Chinese Super League	1	0	0	0	-		1	0	2	0
2016	Beijing Guoan	Chinese Super League	5	0	0	0	-		-		5	0
2017	Beijing Guoan	Chinese Super League	3	0	0	0	-		-		3	0
Career total			14	0	1	0	0	0	2	1	17	1
