= Zhu Yifan =

Chinese footballer

Zhu Yifan 祝一帆
Personal information
- Full name: Zhu Yifan
- Date of birth: March 1, 1988 (age 38)
- Place of birth: Beijing, China
- Height: 1.82 m (6 ft 0 in)
- Position: Midfielder

Youth career
- 2001–2007: Beijing Guoan

Senior career*
Years	Team	Apps	(Gls)
2008–2013	Beijing Guoan	44	(1)
2013	→ Henan Jianye (loan)	28	(2)
2014	Henan Jianye	22	(1)
2015–2017	Changchun Yatai	9	(0)
2016	→ Jiangxi Liansheng (loan)	17	(8)
2017	→ Hebei Elite (loan)	13	(3)
2018	Shenyang Urban	25	(4)
2019–2020	Nantong Zhiyun	22	(3)

International career
2005	China U-17	3	(0)
Medal record
Representing China
Men's football
AFC U-17 Championship
Gold medal – first place	2004 Japan	Team
- * Club domestic league appearances and goals as of 31 December 2020

Zhu Yifan (Chinese: 祝一帆; pinyin: Zhù Yīfān; born March 1, 1988, in Beijing) is a Chinese former football player who played as a midfielder.

== Club career ==
Born and raised in Beijing, Zhu Yifan would join the Beijing Guoan youth team before moving to the senior team where he would eventually earn his senior team debut on June 13, 2009, in a 1-0 league victory against Tianjin Teda F.C. After his debut he would mainly be used as a substitute until February 23, 2010, saw him start his first senior game against Melbourne Victory FC in an AFC Champions League game that Beijing Guoan won 1–0.

On 31 December 2013, Zhu signed for fellow Chinese Super League side Henan Jianye. In February 2015, Zhu transferred to fellow Chinese Super League side Changchun Yatai. In March 2016, Zhu was loaned to China League Two side Jiangxi Liansheng until 31 December 2016. In February 2017, he was loaned to League Two side Hebei Elite until 31 December 2017.

On 27 February 2019, Zhu transferred to League One newcomer Nantong Zhiyun. The following season he was dropped to the reserves after he broke club rules for having a mobile phone on him while on duty and would have to go to the Chinese Football Association for arbitration. At the end of the 2020 league season he would leave the club.

== Personal life ==
Zhu Yifan married synchronized swimmer Fan Jiachen in December 2014.

== Career statistics ==
Statistics accurate as of match played 31 December 2020.

Appearances and goals by club, season and competition
Club	Season	League			National Cup		Continental		Other		Total	
Club	Season	Division	Apps	Goals	Apps	Goals	Apps	Goals	Apps	Goals	Apps	Goals
Beijing Guoan	2008	Chinese Super League	0	0	-		0	0	-		0	0
Beijing Guoan	2009	Chinese Super League	2	0	-		2	0	-		4	0
Beijing Guoan	2010	Chinese Super League	14	1	-		1	0	-		15	1
Beijing Guoan	2011	Chinese Super League	19	0	2	0	-		-		21	0
Beijing Guoan	2012	Chinese Super League	9	0	0	0	3	0	-		12	0
Beijing Guoan	Total		44	1	2	0	6	0	0	0	52	1
Henan Jianye (loan)	2013	China League One	28	2	1	0	-		-		29	2
Henan Jianye	2014	Chinese Super League	22	1	2	0	-		-		24	1
Changchun Yatai	2015	Chinese Super League	9	0	1	0	-		-		10	2
Jiangxi Liansheng (loan)	2016	China League Two	17	8	1	0	-		-		18	1
Hebei Elite (loan)	2017	China League Two	13	3	0	0	-		-		13	3
Shenyang Urban	2018	China League Two	24	4	2	0	-		-		26	4
Nantong Zhiyun	2019	China League One	22	3	1	0	-		-		23	3
Career total			179	22	10	0	6	0	0	0	195	22

== Honours ==
=== Club ===
Beijing Guoan

- Chinese Super League: 2009

Henan Jianye

- China League One: 2013
