= Bai Xiaolei =

Chinese footballer

Bai Xiaolei 柏小磊
Personal information
- Full name: Bai Xiaolei
- Date of birth: 4 September 1985 (age 41)
- Place of birth: Dalian, Liaoning, China
- Height: 1.88 m (6 ft 2 in)
- Position: Goalkeeper

Youth career
- Dalian Shide

Senior career*
Years	Team	Apps	(Gls)
2001–2005	Dalian Sidelong	8	(0)
2006–2007	Harbin Yiteng	15	(0)
2008–2011	Nanchang Hengyuan	30	(0)
2012–2014	Beijing Guoan	0	(0)
2015–2016	Harbin Yiteng	54	(0)
2017–2018	Shijiazhuang Ever Bright	19	(0)
Medal record
Representing China
Men's football
AFC Youth Championship
Silver medal – second place	2004 َ Malaysia	Team
- * Club domestic league appearances and goals as of 28 October 2017

Bai Xiaolei (Chinese: 柏小磊; pinyin: Bǎi Xiǎolěi; born 4 September 1985) is a Chinese former football player.

== Club career ==
Bai started his football career for China League Two club Dalian Sidelong in 2001 where he played as third choice backup goalkeeper to Sun Shoubo and saw the club to win promotion to second tier in the same season. The club moved to Zhuhai and was renamed as Zhuhai Anping in 2003. When Sun Shoubo transferred to Sichuan First City in 2004, Bai became the second choice goalkeeper of the club after Dong Lei and made two appearances throughout the campaign as Zhuhai Zobon finished the second place of the league and promotion to the Chinese Super League. The club's owner Shanghai Zobon Real Estate Co. moved the team to Shanghai and changed the club's name as Shanghai Zobon in 2005 and Bai made a further six appearances in the league.

In 2006, Bai transferred to League Two club Harbin Yiteng, swapping with Wang Dalei, and helped the club win promotion to League One. He played 15 league matches in 2007 season, which secured Harbin's stay in the second tier for the next season.

Bai moved to another League One club Nanchang Bayi Hengyuan in 2008 on a fee of ¥700,000. He played as the second choice goalkeeper of the club after Zhu Jianmin in the 2008 season. Bai was put into the transfer list of the club in December 2008 and was excluded from Nanchang's squad for the 2009 season. In 2010, Bai returned to Nanchang Hengyuan who were newly promoted to the Super League. He played as a backup for Cheng Xiaopeng at first and became a first choice goalkeeper after July, helping the club avoid from relegation. Bai became the second choice goalkeeper again in 2011 after Liu Dianzuo transferred in from Harbin Yiteng.

In January 2012, Bai transferred to Beijing Guoan as Beijing's goalkeeper Yang Zhi injured in the 2012 Guangdong–Hong Kong Cup. He played as second choice goalkeeper after Hou Sen. On 2 May 2012, he made his debut for Beijing in a 2012 AFC Champions League group stage match which Beijing Guoan lost to Ulsan Hyundai 3–2 at Workers Stadium. He became the third choice goalkeeper after Yang Zhi recovered from injury in July. Bai played just two Champions League matches and one FA Cup match in the 2012 season.

On 23 January 2015, Bai transferred back to Harbin Yiteng who was newly relegated to China League One. On 15 February 2017, Bai transferred to League One club Shijiazhuang Ever Bright.

== Honours ==
Dalian Sidelong

- China League Two: 2001
