= Darko Matić =

Croatian footballer (born 1980)

Personal information
- Full name: Darko Matić
- Date of birth: 26 September 1980 (age 46)
- Place of birth: Domaljevac, Bosnia and Herzegovina, Yugoslavia
- Height: 1.83 m (6 ft 0 in)
- Position: Defensive midfielder

Youth career
- 1992–2000: Tennis Borussia Berlin

Senior career*
Years	Team	Apps	(Gls)
2000–2002	FC Thun	53	(6)
2002–2003	HNK Orašje	58	(5)
2004	1. FC Eschborn	17	(4)
2004–2005	HNK Orašje	55	(8)
2005–2006	FC Senec	54	(5)
2007–2008	Tianjin Teda	57	(1)
2009–2015	Beijing Guoan	285	(5)
2016	Changchun Yatai	30	(0)
Total		609	(34)
- * Club domestic league appearances and goals as of 30 October 2016

Darko Matić (born September 26, 1980) is a retired Croatian professional football player who played as a defensive midfielder.

== Club career ==
Matić left his country because of the Yugoslav Wars and would move to Germany to begin his football career with Tennis Borussia Berlin's youth team and Tennis Borussia Berlin first team . He played his first game in the first team in the second division in Germany when he was 17, under the coach Winfried Schaefer. In summer 2000 he would join second tier Swiss football club FC Thun. Matic would help FC Thun winning the promotion after 50 years at the end of the 2001–02 season. In 2002, he signed for HNK Orašje in the Bosnian-Herzegovinian Premier League. In 2004, Matić joined German team 1. FC Eschborn for a short period. In the 2004–05 league season he would join once again top-tier side NK Orašje and play in the Premier League of Bosnia and Herzegovina, helping them finish third and win the Bosnian-Herzegovinian Cup. Once again moving on to this time Slovak football club FC Senec in the 2005–06 league season he would help them win promotion to the Slovak Superliga. He was captain of his team Senec and he got an invitation from the Slovak Football Federation to play for the Slovakia national football team.

He transferred to Chinese Super League club Tianjin Teda in 2007 and would quickly become an integral member of the team by playing in all 28 games of the season. The following season when he aided the team to a fourth-place finish and had a chance to play AFC Champions League football. At the beginning of the 2009 league season Beijing Guoan were interested at his defensive abilities and signed him, this was to prove a successful signing when Matić once more quickly became an integral member of the team and aided Beijing to win their first league title.

Matić featured in most Beijing Guoan matches since joining the club including a run into the last 16 of the AFC Champions League where Guoan lost out to the eventual runners-up, Korean side FC Seoul. He scored a rare goal toward the end of 2014 in a 2–2 draw with Shandong Luneng.

Matić has become a rare foreign player in Chinese football in that he has played over 200 games for Beijing Guoan by the end of the 2014 Chinese Super League season for one club and is now top of the list for appearances by a CSL foreign players. He subsequently became a legend amongst fans in Beijing with a following on Sina Weibo of over 1.3 million people. Matić has expressed interest in staying in China in the future with the possibility of getting involved in coaching.

In January 2016, Matić transferred to fellow Chinese Super League side Changchun Yatai. He announced his retirement in February 2017.

Matić became the director of International Division of Beijing Guoan on 5 April 2017.

== Personal life ==
Matić is ethnic Bosnian Croat. He is fluent in nine languages with those being Chinese, German, Croatian, English, French, Italian, Spanish, Portuguese, and Czech. He has proven his fluency in Chinese with his numerous post-game interviews.

== Career statistics ==
Appearances and goals by club, season and competition
Club	Season	League			National Cup		Continental		Other		Total	
Club	Season	Division	Apps	Goals	Apps	Goals	Apps	Goals	Apps	Goals	Apps	Goals
Tianjin Teda	2007	Chinese Super League	28	1	—		—		—		28	1
Tianjin Teda	2008	Chinese Super League	29	0	—		—		—		29	0
Tianjin Teda	Total		57	1	—		—		—		57	1
Beijing Guoan	2009	Chinese Super League	29	0	—		4	0	—		33	0
Beijing Guoan	2010	Chinese Super League	28	0	—		6	0	—		34	0
Beijing Guoan	2011	Chinese Super League	29	0	4	1	—		—		33	1
Beijing Guoan	2012	Chinese Super League	29	0	2	0	4	0	—		35	0
Beijing Guoan	2013	Chinese Super League	27	0	3	0	8	0	—		38	0
Beijing Guoan	2014	Chinese Super League	28	1	3	0	6	0	—		37	1
Beijing Guoan	2015	Chinese Super League	30	1	1	0	1	0	—		32	1
Beijing Guoan	Total		200	2	13	1	29	0	—		242	3
Changchun Yatai	2016	Chinese Super League	30	0	0	0	—		—		30	0
Career total			287	3	13	1	29	0	0	0	329	4

== Honours ==
Beijing Guoan

- Chinese Super League: 2009
