= Xu Wu (footballer, born 1991) =

Chinese footballer

Xu Wu 徐武
Personal information
- Full name: Xu Wu
- Date of birth: 14 February 1991 (age 35)
- Place of birth: Tiantai, Zhejiang, China
- Height: 1.70 m (5 ft 7 in)
- Position: Midfielder

Team information
- Current team: Xiamen Feilu
- Number: 9

Youth career
- Beijing Guoan

Senior career*
Years	Team	Apps	(Gls)
2011–2014	Beijing Guoan	2	(0)
2013	→ Shenyang Dongjin (loan)	6	(0)
2015	Beijing BIT	19	(0)
2016–2017	Chengdu Qbao	36	(2)
2018–2022	Shaanxi Chang'an Athletic	54	(5)
2023–2024	Shaanxi Union	23	(4)
2025	Yulin Mobei Miners	2	(0)
2026–	Xiamen Feilu	14	(1)
- * Club domestic league appearances and goals as of 29 July 2026

Xu Wu (Chinese: 徐武; pinyin: Xú Wǔ; born 14 February 1991) is a Chinese football player.

== Club career ==
Xu started his football career in 2011 when he was promoted to Beijing Guoan's first team squad. On 2 May 2012, he made his senior debut in a 2012 AFC Champions League group stage match which Beijing lost to Ulsan Hyundai 3–2 at Workers Stadium. In July 2013, Xu was loaned to China League Two side Shenyang Dongjin until the end of 2013 season.

In March 2015, Xu transferred to China League One side Beijing BIT. On 14 March 2015, Xu transferred to China League Two side Chengdu Qbao. Xu would go on to established himself as regular within the team until the club was dissolved on 1 March due to financial irregularity from the clubs owner.

Xu joined third tier club Shaanxi Chang'an Athletic. His move saw him gain promotion with the club at the end of the end of the 2018 China League Two campaign. In the following season he was an integral member of the squad that established themselves within the league until the club faced financial difficulties at the end of the 2022 China League One campaign.

On April 20, 2023 Xu joined phoenix club Shaanxi Chang'an Union and was able to be part of the team that would gain admittance to the 2023 Chinese Champions League. Within the tournament the club would win promotion to China League Two.

== Career statistics ==
Statistics accurate as of match played 29 July 2026.

Appearances and goals by club, season and competition
Club	Season	League			National Cup		Continental		Other		Total	
Club	Season	Division	Apps	Goals	Apps	Goals	Apps	Goals	Apps	Goals	Apps	Goals
Beijing Guoan	2011	Chinese Super League	0	0	0	0	-		-		0	0
Beijing Guoan	2012	Chinese Super League	2	0	1	0	2	0	-		5	0
Beijing Guoan	2013	Chinese Super League	0	0	0	0	0	0	-		0	0
Beijing Guoan	2014	Chinese Super League	0	0	0	0	0	0	-		0	0
Beijing Guoan	Total		2	0	1	0	2	0	0	0	5	0
Shenyang Dongjin (loan)	2013	China League Two	6	0	0	0	-		-		6	0
Beijing BIT	2015	China League One	19	0	1	0	-		-		20	0
Chengdu Qbao	2016	China League Two	18	1	3	0	-		-		21	1
Chengdu Qbao	2017	China League Two	18	1	1	0	-		-		19	1
Chengdu Qbao	Total		36	2	4	0	0	0	0	0	40	2
Shaanxi Chang'an Athletic	2018	China League Two	19	3	2	0	-		-		21	3
Shaanxi Chang'an Athletic	2019	China League One	16	0	1	0	-		-		17	0
Shaanxi Chang'an Athletic	2020	China League One	7	0	-		-		-		7	0
Shaanxi Chang'an Athletic	2021	China League One	1	0	0	0	-		-		1	0
Shaanxi Chang'an Athletic	2022	China League One	11	2	0	0	-		-		11	2
Shaanxi Chang'an Athletic	Total		54	5	3	0	0	0	0	0	57	5
Shaanxi Chang'an Union	2023	CMCL	12	2	-		-		-		12	2
Shaanxi Chang'an Union	2024	China League Two	11	2	2	0	-		-		13	2
Shaanxi Chang'an Union	Total		23	4	2	0	0	0	0	0	25	4
Yulin Mobei Miners	2025	CMCL	2	0	-		-		-		2	0
Xiamen Feilu	2025	China League Two	14	1	1	0	-		-		15	1
Career total			156	12	12	0	2	0	0	0	170	12

== Honours ==
Shaanxi Chang'an Union

- CMCL play-offs: 2023
