= Zhang Xinxin (footballer) =

Chinese footballer

Zhang Xinxin 张辛昕
Personal information
- Full name: Zhang Xinin
- Date of birth: October 19, 1983 (age 43)
- Place of birth: Beijing, China
- Height: 1.78 m (5 ft 10 in)
- Positions: Left-back; midfielder

Youth career
- 1995–2001: Beijing Sangao

Senior career*
Years	Team	Apps	(Gls)
2002–2004	Shenzhen Ping'an	40	(1)
2005–2008	Wuhan Huanghelou	82	(4)
2009–2017	Beijing Guoan	135	(1)

International career^{‡}
2011–2012	China	2	(0)

Managerial career
- 2018: China U19 (trainer)
- 2019-?: Beijing Guoan Reverse (assistant coach)
- 2022: Suzhou Dongwu (team manager)
- * Club domestic league appearances and goals as of 4 November 2017 ‡ National team caps and goals as of 5 November 2012

Zhang Xinxin (simplified Chinese: 张辛昕; traditional Chinese: 張辛昕; pinyin: Zhāng Xīnxīn; born October 19, 1983) is a Chinese former international football player.

== Club career ==
Originally from Beijing, he would move to Shenzhen to begin his professional football career with top-tier football club Shenzhen Ping'an at the beginning of the 2002 football league season where he initially started out as a midfielder. With them he would become a squad regular and even see them win the league title in the 2004 league season. He was however unable to establish himself within the squad and would transfer to the newly promoted Wuhan Huanghelou team at the beginning of the 2005 Chinese Super League season. At Wuhan F.C. Zhang would have greater playing time and was part of the squad that won the Chinese Super League Cup as well as finishing fifth within the league. Zhang would be a vital player as he helped guide the club to several mid-table finishes until in the 2008 Chinese Super League when the club found themselves fighting against relegation and one of their players was given an eight match ban after a scuffle, the club thought the punishment was too hard by the Chinese Football Association, which then saw the club disband in retaliation as well as being subsequently relegated from the league. This led to Zhang transferring to Beijing Guoan at the beginning of the 2009 Chinese Super League season for 1,150,000 RMB. In his first season, the club's manager Lee Jang-Soo would move him to left-back where he quickly establish himself as an integral member of the team and would aid Beijing Guoan to win the league title at the end of the season.

== International career ==
Zhang Xinxin was given a call-up to the senior Chinese national team for the first time against Laos on July 28, 2011 in a 2014 FIFA World Cup qualification game, where China won 6–1.

== Honours ==
Shenzhen Ping'an

- Chinese Super League: 2004

Wuhan Huanghelou

- Chinese Super League Cup: 2005

Beijing Guoan

- Chinese Super League: 2009
