= Wang Xiaolong =

Chinese footballer (born 1986)

Wang Xiaolong 王晓龙
Personal information
- Full name: Wang Xiaolong
- Date of birth: 11 March 1986 (age 40)
- Place of birth: Beijing, China
- Height: 1.76 m (5 ft 9 in)
- Position: Left winger

Youth career
- 2001–2003: RDFZ three high football club
- 2004: Shandong Luneng

Senior career*
Years	Team	Apps	(Gls)
2005–2009	Shandong Luneng	35	(2)
2010–2013	Beijing Guoan	83	(12)
2014–2016	Guangzhou R&F	39	(2)
2017–2019	Tianjin Quanjian	39	(2)
2020–2021	Chengdu Better City	5	(1)
2021	Hebei Zhuoao	22	(2)

International career^{‡}
2006–2008	China U-23		
2012	China	3	(0)
- * Club domestic league appearances and goals as of 22 December 2023 ‡ National team caps and goals as of 26 October 2014

Wang Xiaolong (simplified Chinese: 王晓龙; traditional Chinese: 王曉龍; pinyin: Wáng Xiǎolóng; born 11 March 1986) is a Chinese former footballer who played as winger.

== Club career ==
Wang Xiaolong would play for Shandong Luneng's youth team before moving to the senior team and would eventually earn his senior team debut on 29 March 2006 in a game against Shenzhen Kingway. He would later score his first senior goal against Liaoning Hongyun on 27 September 2008 in a 4-2 victory. With Shandong, he would twice win the league and the Chinese FA Cup, however he was unable to establish himself as a first choice player within the team and at the end of the 2009 season he was allowed to leave the club.

With the chance to return to his hometown and join reigning champions Beijing Guoan, Wang Xiaolong would make the switch from Shandong to Beijing at the beginning of the 2010 league season with teammate Wu Hao in a package deal. On 18 February 2014, Wang transferred to fellow Chinese Super League side Guangzhou R&F. He made his debut for the club in a 1-1 draw against Tianjin Teda on 9 March 2014. He scored his first two goals for the club on 31 July 2014 in a 5-1 win against Liaoning Whowin.

On 21 January 2017, Wang moved to Chinese Super League newcomer Tianjin Quanjian.

In 2021, Wang retired from professional football and became a youth football coach.

== International career ==
In December 2006, Wang would be called up to the Chinese under-23 national team in preparation for the 2008 Summer Olympics and would play in several official and unofficial friendlies including a match where he scored a goal against Bayern Munich on 13 January 2008. Wang would not go to the 2008 Summer Olympics, however, after he established himself at Beijing he would be promoted to the senior team on 3 June 2012 when he played against Spain in a 1-0 defeat.

== Career statistics ==
Statistics accurate as of match played 31 December 2020.

Appearances and goals by club, season and competition
Club	Season	League			National Cup		League Cup		Continental		Total	
Club	Season	Division	Apps	Goals	Apps	Goals	Apps	Goals	Apps	Goals	Apps	Goals
Shandong Luneng	2005	Chinese Super League	0	0	0	0		0	0	0	0	0
Shandong Luneng	2006	Chinese Super League	6	0	1	0	-		-		7	0
Shandong Luneng	2007	Chinese Super League	12	0	-		-			0	12	0
Shandong Luneng	2008	Chinese Super League	7	2	-		-		-		7	2
Shandong Luneng	2009	Chinese Super League	10	0	-		-		2	0	12	0
Shandong Luneng	Total		35	2	1	0	0	0	2	0	38	2
Beijing Guoan	2010	Chinese Super League	8	1	-		-		3	0	11	1
Beijing Guoan	2011	Chinese Super League	25	6	3	2	-		-		28	8
Beijing Guoan	2012	Chinese Super League	28	3	2	2	-		4	1	34	6
Beijing Guoan	2013	Chinese Super League	22	2	2	2	-		7	0	31	4
Beijing Guoan	Total		83	12	7	6	0	0	14	1	104	19
Guangzhou R&F	2014	Chinese Super League	26	2	1	0	-		-		27	2
Guangzhou R&F	2015	Chinese Super League	6	0	0	0	-		0	0	6	0
Guangzhou R&F	2016	Chinese Super League	7	0	5	0	-		-		12	0
Guangzhou R&F	Total		39	2	6	0	0	0	0	0	45	2
Tianjin Quanjian	2017	Chinese Super League	13	0	2	0	-		-		15	0
Tianjin Quanjian	2018	Chinese Super League	15	1	2	0	-		7	0	24	1
Tianjin Quanjian	2019	Chinese Super League	11	1	3	0	-		-		14	1
Tianjin Quanjian	Total		39	2	7	0	0	0	7	0	53	2
Chengdu Better City	2020	China League One	5	1	1	0	-		-		6	1
Career total			201	19	22	6	0	0	23	1	246	26

== Honours ==
=== Club ===
Shandong Luneng

- Chinese Super League: 2006, 2008
- Chinese FA Cup: 2006
