= Zhang Sipeng =

Chinese footballer

Zhang Sipeng 张思鹏
Personal information
- Full name: Zhang Sipeng
- Date of birth: 14 May 1987 (age 39)
- Place of birth: Beijing, China
- Height: 1.88 m (6 ft 2 in)
- Position: Goalkeeper

Team information
- Current team: Chongqing Tonglianglong (goalkeeping coach)

Youth career
- 2003–2005: Beijing Sangao
- 2005–2006: Beijing Guoan

Senior career*
Years	Team	Apps	(Gls)
2007–2014	Beijing Guoan	4	(0)
2012	→ Beijing Yitong Kuche (loan)	15	(0)
2015–2017	Jiangsu Suning	37	(0)
2018–2021	Guizhou Hengfeng	71	(0)
2024	Shijiazhuang Gongfu	2	(0)

International career
2007	China U23	1	(0)

Managerial career
- 2024–2025: Shijiazhuang Gongfu (goalkeeping)
- 2026–: Chongqing Tonglianglong (goalkeeping)
- * Club domestic league appearances and goals as of 18 March 2024

Zhang Sipeng (simplified Chinese: 张思鹏; traditional Chinese: 張思鵬; pinyin: Zhāng Sīpéng) (born 14 May 1987 in Haidian, Beijing) is a Chinese football coach and retired professional footballer who played as a goalkeeper.

== Club career ==
In 2007 Zhang Sipeng started his professional footballer career with Beijing Guoan in the Chinese Super League. He immediately became a team regular within his first season at the football squad and has consistently played understudy to Yang Zhi as the first choice goalkeeper. He would eventually make his league debut for Beijing on 13 June 2009 in a game against Tianjin Teda that saw Beijing win 1–0.

On 2 January 2015, Zhang transferred to fellow Chinese Super League side Jiangsu Sainty. On 26 February 2018, Zhang transferred to Guizhou Hengfeng.

=== Coaching career ===
On 21 January 2026, Zhang was appointed as the goalkeeping coach of Chinese Super League club Chongqing Tonglianglong.

== Career statistics ==
Statistics accurate as of match played 31 December 2020.

Appearances and goals by club, season and competition
Club	Season	League			National Cup		Continental		Other		Total	
Club	Season	Division	Apps	Goals	Apps	Goals	Apps	Goals	Apps	Goals	Apps	Goals
Beijing Guoan	2007	Chinese Super League	0	0	-		-		-		0	0
Beijing Guoan	2008	Chinese Super League	0	0	-		0	0	-		0	0
Beijing Guoan	2009	Chinese Super League	1	0	-		0	0	-		1	0
Beijing Guoan	2010	Chinese Super League	1	0	-		1	0	-		2	0
Beijing Guoan	2011	Chinese Super League	0	0	0	0	-		-		0	0
Beijing Guoan	2013	Chinese Super League	2	0	0	0	-		-		2	0
Beijing Guoan	2014	Chinese Super League	0	0	0	0	2	0	-		2	0
Beijing Guoan	Total		4	0	0	0	3	0	0	0	7	0
Beijing Yitong Kuche (Loan)	2012	China League Two	15	0	-		-		-		15	0
Jiangsu Suning	2015	Chinese Super League	22	0	5	0	-		-		27	0
Jiangsu Suning	2016	Chinese Super League	5	0	1	0	4	0	1 (Note: Appearances in Chinese FA Super Cup)	0	11	0
Jiangsu Suning	2017	Chinese Super League	10	0	2	0	6	0	1	0	19	0
Jiangsu Suning	Total		37	0	8	0	10	0	2	0	57	0
Guizhou Hengfeng	2018	Chinese Super League	18	0	1	0	-		-		19	0
Guizhou Hengfeng	2019	China League One	30	0	0	0	-		-		30	0
Guizhou Hengfeng	2020	China League One	13	0	0	0	-		-		13	0
Guizhou Hengfeng	Total		61	0	1	0	0	0	0	0	62	0
Career total			117	0	9	0	13	0	2	0	141	0

== Honours ==
=== Club ===
Jiangsu Sainty

- Chinese FA Cup: 2015
