= Zhou Ting =

Chinese footballer

Zhou Ting 周挺
Personal information
- Date of birth: 5 February 1979 (age 47)
- Place of birth: Dalian, Liaoning, China
- Height: 1.81 m (5 ft 11 in)
- Positions: Full-back; midfielder

Team information
- Current team: China (assistant coach)

Youth career
- 1994–1998: Dalian Wanda

Senior career*
| Years | Team | Apps | (Gls) |
| 1997 | → Shenzhen Kinspar (loan) | 6 | (0) |
| 1998 | → Qianwei Huandao (loan) | 0 | (0) |
| 1999–2003 | Yunnan Hongta | 108 | (7) |
| 2004 | Qingdao Hainiu | 19 | (0) |
| 2005 | Shenzhen Jianlibao | 19 | (2) |
| 2006–2016 | Beijing Guoan | 243 | (7) |
| 2017–2020 | Dalian Professional | 63 | (3) |

International career^{‡}
| 2003–2004 | China | 13 | (0) |

Managerial career
- 2021–2022: Dalian Pro Youth (assistant)
- 2024–2025: Dalian Yingbo U-21
- 2026–: China (assistant)
- 2026–: Dalian Yingbo B
Medal record
Representing China
Men's football
AFC Asian Cup
| Silver medal – second place | 2004 China | Team |
East Asian Football Championship
| Bronze medal – third place | 2003 Japan | Team |
- * Club domestic league appearances and goals as of 31 December 2020 ‡ National team caps and goals as of 5 November 2012

Zhou Ting (Chinese: 周挺; pinyin: Zhōu Tǐng; born 5 February 1979) is a Chinese football coach and former professional footballer who played as a full-back or midfielder.

His playing career would see him win the 2009 Chinese Super League title with Beijing Guoan while he also represented Shenzhen Kinspar, Yunnan Hongta, Qingdao Hainiu, Shenzhen Jianlibao and Dalian Professional throughout his career. Within his career he would achieve the distinction for being the oldest player to score a goal (39 years and 208 days), and as the oldest appearing player (40 years and 299 days) within professional Chinese Super League history. His reputation as a tough tackler throughout his career also saw him being the first player to receive 100 yellow cards in the Chinese first-tier league history.

== Club career ==
Zhou Ting joined Chinese Jia-A League side Dalian Wanda youth team in 1994. He started his senior career in 1997 when he was loaned to second-tier club Shenzhen Kinspar with the appreciation of team manager Gai Zengjun. On 19 July 1997, he made his senior debut in a 3–3 home draw against Shenyang Haishi. He played six league matches in the 1997 season and returned to Dalian Wanda in 1998. Zhou was expelled by team manager Xu Genbao after 1998 Far East Club Championship in February 1998. He joined Jia-A League club Qianwei Huandao in the summer 1998 but left the club several months later due to the unfulfillment of pledged conditions.

In 1999, Zhou agreed to joined Chinese Jia-B League side Xiamen which was coached by former Dalian Wanda manager Chi Shangbin. However, he was picked by another second-tier club Yunnan Hongta in advance in 1999 Chinese Football League Transfer Draft. He swifted his position from attacking midfielder to left-back and quickly established himself within the team, playing in 17 games within his debut season as Yunnan won promotion to the first-tier. He stayed with Yunnan Hongta until the 2003 season.

Zhou signed a pre-contract with Chinese Super League side Qingdao Etsong Hainiu in December 2003 after Yunnan Hongta accepted a transfer fee of ¥6 million. However, after Yunnan Hongta was sold and merger with Chongqing Lifan, Qingdao Etsong Hainiu successfully reduced his transfer fee to ¥2.8 million on 17 January 2004. Zhou was named in the transfer list at the end of 2004 season after Jonoon Group took charge the club. He transferred to Super League defence champion Shenzhen Jianlibao in January 2005.

After a chaos season with Shenzhen, Zhou moved to Beijing Guoan in January 2006. He established himself as a regular team member and went on to aid Beijing in winning the 2009 Chinese Super League title. On 26 October 2014, he was booked by offending the referee in a 1–0 away win over Guangzhou Evergrande, making him the first player to receive 100 yellow cards in the Chinese first-tier league. On 10 May 2015, he claimed a goal against Changchun Yatai to set the record of the oldest native player to score in the Chinese Super League at 36 years and 94 days.

On 13 February 2017, Zhou transferred to his hometown club Dalian Yifang in the China League One. On 11 March 2017, he made his debut for the club in a 2–0 away win over Meizhou Hakka. He scored his first goal for Dalian on 12 August 2017, in a 1–1 away draw to Wuhan Zall. He quickly established himself within the team's defence, scoring two goals in 25 appearances, and helped win the division championship to promoted back to the Chinese Super League with the club. On 1 September 2018, Zhou scored in a 4–3 win against Shandong Luneng Taishan, overtaking Festus Baise as the Chinese first-tier league's oldest scoring player at 39 years and 208 days. On 23 November 2019, he broke the record of the oldest appearing player at 40 years and 291 days, which was previous held by Rolando Schiavi since 2013. On 1 December 2019, Zhou renewed his record to 40 years and 299 days. At the end of the 2020 Chinese Super League, Zhou would retire when his contract with the club came to an end.

== International career ==
Due to his versatility to play on either flanks, Zhou Ting was called up to the senior national team in a friendly against Chile on 20 August 2003 in a 0-0 draw. Under the Chinese head coach Arie Haan, Zhou Ting would become a regular member within the team and would be included in the squads that participated in the 2003 East Asian Football Championship, FIFA World Cup qualification and the squad that came runners-up in the 2004 AFC Asian Cup.

== Career statistics ==
=== Club statistics ===
As of 31 December 2020.

Appearances and goals by club, season and competition
| Club | Season | League | | | National Cup | | League Cup | | Continental | | Other | | Total | |
| Club | Season | Division | Apps | Goals | Apps | Goals | Apps | Goals | Apps | Goals | Apps | Goals | Apps | Goals |
|---|---|---|---|---|---|---|---|---|---|---|---|---|---|---|
| Shenzhen Kinspar (loan) | 1997 | Chinese Jia-B League | 6 | 0 | 0 | 0 | - | | - | | - | | 6 | 0 |
| Qianwei Huandao (loan) | 1998 | Chinese Jia-A League | 0 | 0 | 0 | 0 | - | | - | | - | | 0 | 0 |
| Yunnan Hongta | 1999 | Chinese Jia-B League | 17 | 1 | | | - | | - | | - | | 17 | 1 |
| Yunnan Hongta | 2000 | Chinese Jia-A League | 24 | 0 | 1 | 0 | - | | - | | - | | 25 | 0 |
| Yunnan Hongta | 2001 | Chinese Jia-A League | 21 | 3 | 2 | 0 | - | | - | | - | | 23 | 3 |
| Yunnan Hongta | 2002 | Chinese Jia-A League | 24 | 2 | 3 | 0 | - | | - | | - | | 27 | 2 |
| Yunnan Hongta | 2003 | Chinese Jia-A League | 22 | 1 | 4 | 0 | - | | - | | - | | 26 | 1 |
| Yunnan Hongta | Total | | 108 | 7 | 10 | 0 | 0 | 0 | 0 | 0 | 0 | 0 | 118 | 7 |
| Qingdao Hainiu | 2004 | Chinese Super League | 19 | 0 | 2 | 0 | 0 | 0 | - | | - | | 21 | 0 |
| Shenzhen Jianlibao | 2005 | Chinese Super League | 19 | 2 | 3 | 2 | 5 | 2 | 8 | 0 | 1 (Note: Appearances in A3 Champions Cup) | 0 | 36 | 6 |
| Beijing Guoan | 2006 | Chinese Super League | 16 | 0 | 0 | 0 | - | | - | | - | | 16 | 0 |
| Beijing Guoan | 2007 | Chinese Super League | 24 | 0 | - | | - | | - | | - | | 24 | 0 |
| Beijing Guoan | 2008 | Chinese Super League | 20 | 0 | - | | - | | 4 | 0 | - | | 24 | 0 |
| Beijing Guoan | 2009 | Chinese Super League | 18 | 3 | - | | - | | 5 | 0 | - | | 23 | 3 |
| Beijing Guoan | 2010 | Chinese Super League | 27 | 1 | - | | - | | 7 | 0 | - | | 34 | 1 |
| Beijing Guoan | 2011 | Chinese Super League | 30 | 2 | 4 | 0 | - | | - | | - | | 34 | 2 |
| Beijing Guoan | 2012 | Chinese Super League | 28 | 0 | 2 | 0 | - | | 4 | 0 | - | | 34 | 0 |
| Beijing Guoan | 2013 | Chinese Super League | 21 | 0 | 2 | 0 | - | | 7 | 0 | - | | 30 | 0 |
| Beijing Guoan | 2014 | Chinese Super League | 25 | 0 | 3 | 0 | - | | 6 | 0 | - | | 34 | 0 |
| Beijing Guoan | 2015 | Chinese Super League | 24 | 1 | 0 | 0 | - | | 8 | 0 | - | | 32 | 1 |
| Beijing Guoan | 2016 | Chinese Super League | 10 | 0 | 3 | 0 | - | | - | | - | | 13 | 0 |
| Beijing Guoan | Total | | 243 | 7 | 14 | 0 | 0 | 0 | 41 | 0 | 0 | 0 | 298 | 7 |
| Dalian Yifang | 2017 | China League One | 25 | 2 | 1 | 0 | - | | - | | - | | 26 | 2 |
| Dalian Yifang | 2018 | Chinese Super League | 20 | 1 | 5 | 0 | - | | - | | - | | 25 | 1 |
| Dalian Yifang | 2019 | Chinese Super League | 18 | 0 | 4 | 0 | - | | - | | - | | 22 | 0 |
| Dalian Yifang | Total | | 63 | 3 | 10 | 0 | 0 | 0 | 0 | 0 | 0 | 0 | 73 | 3 |
| Career total | | | 458 | 19 | 39 | 2 | 5 | 2 | 49 | 0 | 1 | 0 | 552 | 21 |

=== International statistics ===
National team
| Year | Apps | Goals |
|---|---|---|
| 2003 | 5 | 0 |
| 2004 | 8 | 0 |
| Total | 13 | 0 |

== Honours ==
=== Club ===
Beijing Guoan

- Chinese Super League: 2009

Dalian Yifang

- China League One: 2017
