= Shao Jiayi =

Chinese footballer (born 1980)

Shao Jiayi 邵佳一
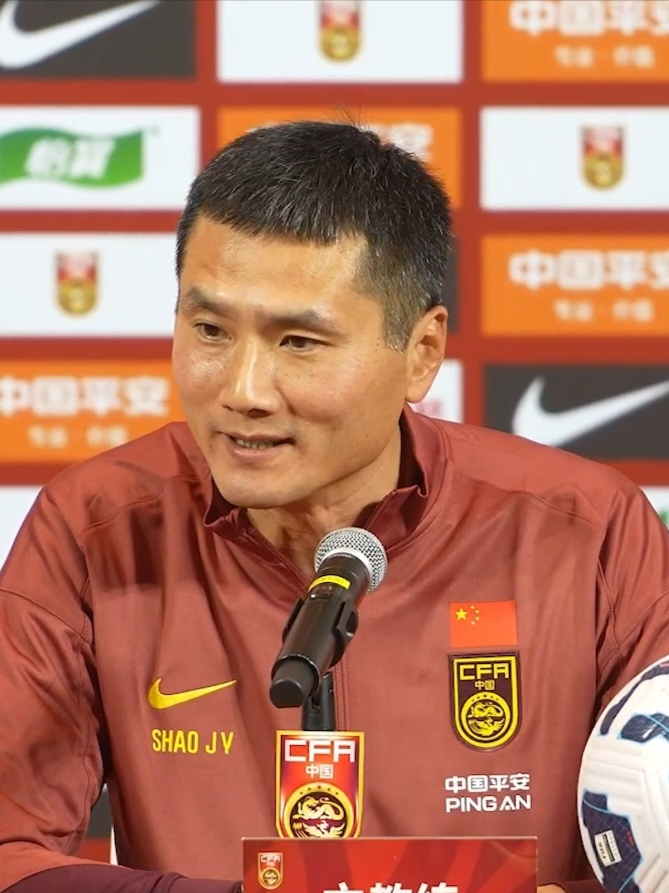
- Shao in 2026

Personal information
- Date of birth: 10 April 1980 (age 46)
- Place of birth: Beijing, China
- Height: 1.88 m (6 ft 2 in)
- Position: Midfielder

Team information
- Current team: China national football team (head coach)

Senior career*
Years	Team	Apps	(Gls)
1999–2002	Beijing Guoan	70	(12)
2002–2006	1860 Munich	58	(8)
2006–2011	Energie Cottbus	100	(15)
2008–2009	Energie Cottbus II	10	(0)
2011	MSV Duisburg	10	(1)
2012–2015	Beijing Guoan	85	(15)
Total		333	(51)

International career
2000–2010	China	40	(8)

Managerial career
- 2024–2025: Qingdao West Coast
- 2025–: China
Medal record
Representing China
Men's football
AFC Asian Cup
Silver medal – second place	2004 China	Team
- * Club domestic league appearances and goals

Shao Jiayi (Chinese: 邵佳一; pinyin: Shào Jiāyī; born 10 April 1980) is a Chinese professional football manager and a former professional footballer who played as a midfielder. He is the head coach of the China national football team. He represented Beijing Guoan (two spells), TSV 1860 Munich, Energie Cottbus and MSV Duisburg as well as the China national team with which he participated in the 2000 AFC Asian Cup, 2002 FIFA World Cup and 2004 AFC Asian Cup.

== Club career ==
Shao Jiayi started his football career in the 1999 league season playing for top-tier side Beijing Guoan where then manager Shen Xiangfu promoted him to the first team. Despite a change in management with Milovan Đorić and Wei Kexing coming in the following season, Shao gradually started to establish himself as regular within the team and due to his commanding presence in centre midfield, he was touted as one of the most exciting players in Chinese football. He then helped guide the club to the 2000 Chinese FA Cup final where they lost 4–2 on aggregate against Chongqing Lifan. After his breakout 2000 season, Shao became a vital member of the team's midfield and once again helped guide the club to another Chinese FA Cup final in 2001 where this time they faced Dalian Shide, losing 4–1 on aggregate.

After playing in the 2002 FIFA World Cup, Shao gathered enough attention to impress Bundesliga side 1860 Munich, who signed him on four-year loan deal from Beijing. A permanent transfer was made on 14 January 2003, reported to be approximately €1.3 million. Shao played there for three-and-a-half seasons before transferring to Energie Cottbus, signing a three-year contract on 13 July 2006.

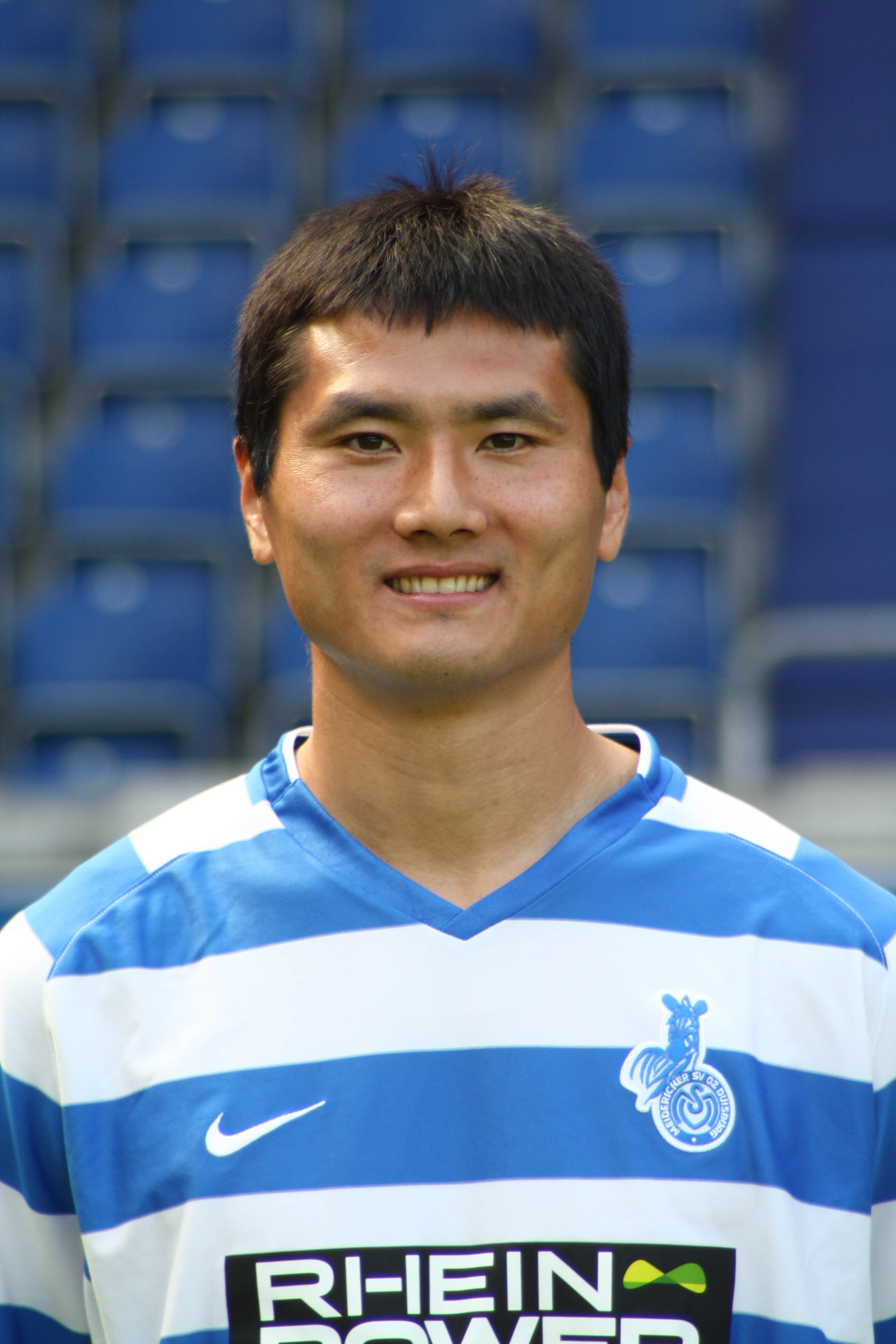
Shao with MSV Duisburg in 2011

He scored his first goals for Energie Cottbus at home against Hertha BSC and away to Borussia Dortmund after coming on as a substitute in both matches. After extending his stay with Energie Cottbus for two more seasons, on 30 June 2011, Shao signed with 2. Bundesliga side MSV Duisburg and made his debut for the club on 17 July 2011 in a 3–2 loss against Karlsruher SC.

On 13 December 2011, Shao returned to the Chinese Super League to rejoin his former club Beijing Guoan after playing nine years in Germany. On 29 October 2015, Shao announced that he had decided to retire from football.

== International career ==
Shao's performances with Beijing Guoan led to him being called up by then manager Bora Milutinović to the Chinese national team and was included in the squad that placed fourth in the 2000 AFC Asian Cup. Shao found more success with the national team when he was included in the squad that secured qualification for the 2002 FIFA World Cup. At the tournament, he played in two games – receiving a red card against Turkey – while China were knocked out of the group stage. Shao was also a key player for the national team in the 2004 AFC Asian Cup where he scored three goals during the tournament which led China to finish as runners-up.

== Managerial career ==
=== Qingdao West Coast ===
On 29 July 2024, Shao was appointed as manager of Chinese Super League club Qingdao West Coast.

=== China ===
On 5 November 2025, Shao was appointed as the head coach of the China national team, stepping away from his duties at Qingdao West Coast.

== Career statistics ==
=== Club ===
Appearances and goals by club, season and competition
Club	Season	League			Cup		Continental		Other		Total		Ref.
Club	Season	Division	Apps	Goals	Apps	Goals	Apps	Goals	Apps	Goals	Apps	Goals	Ref.
Beijing Guoan	1999	Chinese Jia-A League	8	1	0	0	–		–		8	1	
Beijing Guoan	2000	Chinese Jia-A League	15	1	3	0	–		–		18	1	
Beijing Guoan	2001	Chinese Jia-A League	20	3	5	1	–		–		25	4	
Beijing Guoan	2002	Chinese Jia-A League	27	7	4	0	–		–		31	7	
Beijing Guoan	Total		70	12	12	1	0	0	0	0	82	13	–
1860 Munich	2002–03	Bundesliga	12	1	1	0	–		–		13	1	
1860 Munich	2003–04	Bundesliga	5	0	0	0	–		–		5	0	
1860 Munich	2004–05	2. Bundesliga	16	3	0	0	–		–		16	3	
1860 Munich	2005–06	2. Bundesliga	25	4	3	2	–		–		28	6	
1860 Munich	Total		58	8	4	2	0	0	0	0	62	10	–
Energie Cottbus	2006–07	Bundesliga	29	2	1	0	–		–		30	2	
Energie Cottbus	2007–08	Bundesliga	14	0	0	0	–		–		14	0	
Energie Cottbus	2008–09	Bundesliga	7	1	0	0	–		2 (Note: Two appearances in Bundesliga relegation playoffs)	0	9	1	
Energie Cottbus	2009–10	2. Bundesliga	25	8	1	1	–		–		26	9	
Energie Cottbus	2010–11	2. Bundesliga	25	4	3	2	–		–		28	6	
Energie Cottbus	Total		58	8	4	2	0	0	2	0	64	10	–
Energie Cottbus II	2008–09	Regionalliga Nord	10	0	0	0	–		–		10	0	
MSV Duisburg	2011–12	2. Bundesliga	10	1	1	0	–		–		11	1	
Beijing Guoan	2012	Chinese Super League	20	3	0	0	4	1	–		24	4	
Beijing Guoan	2013	Chinese Super League	26	6	3	1	7	1	–		36	8	
Beijing Guoan	2014	Chinese Super League	22	3	3	1	7	3	–		32	7	
Beijing Guoan	2015	Chinese Super League	17	3	2	0	7	1	–		26	4	
Beijing Guoan	Total		85	15	8	2	25	6	0	0	118	23	–
Career total			333	51	30	8	25	6	2	0	390	65	–

=== International ===
Appearances and goals by national team and year
National team	Year	Apps	Goals
China	2000	3	0
China	2001	10	0
China	2002	3	0
China	2003	0	0
China	2004	9	5
China	2005	4	0
China	2006	3	1
China	2007	5	2
China	2008	1	0
China	2009	1	0
China	2010	1	0
Total		40	8

Scores and results list China's goal tally first, score column indicates score after each Shao goal.

List of international goals scored by Shao Jiayi
No.	Date	Venue	Opponent	Score	Result	Competition
1	21 July 2004	Workers Stadium, Beijing, China	Indonesia	1–0	5–0	2004 AFC Asian Cup
2	21 July 2004	Workers Stadium, Beijing, China	Indonesia	4–0	5–0	2004 AFC Asian Cup
3	3 August 2004	Workers Stadium, Beijing, China	Iran	1–0	1–1 (4–3 PSO)	2004 AFC Asian Cup
4	17 November 2004	Tianhe Stadium, Guangzhou, China	Hong Kong	2–0	7–0	2006 FIFA World Cup qualifier
5	17 November 2004	Tianhe Stadium, Guangzhou, China	Hong Kong	3–0	7–0	2006 FIFA World Cup qualifier
6	16 August 2006	TEDA Football Stadium, Tianjin, China	Singapore	1–0	1–0	2007 AFC Asian Cup qualifier
7	10 July 2007	Bukit Jalil National Stadium, Kuala Lumpur, Malaysia	Malaysia	2–0	5–1	2007 AFC Asian Cup
8	15 July 2007	Bukit Jalil National Stadium, Kuala Lumpur, Malaysia	Iran	1–0	2–2	2007 AFC Asian Cup

== Honours ==
As Player

Individual

- AFC Asian Cup All-Star Team: 2004
- Chinese Jia-A League Team of the Year: 2002
- AFC Asian Cup Fans' All Time Best XI: 2018
