= Zhang Xiaobin (footballer, born 1985) =

Chinese footballer

Zhang Xiaobin 张晓彬
Personal information
- Date of birth: February 14, 1985 (age 41)
- Place of birth: Zhangjiakou, Hebei, China
- Height: 1.77 m (5 ft 10 in)
- Position: Midfielder

Youth career
- Shaanxi Guoli
- 2001–2004: Stockport County

Senior career*
Years	Team	Apps	(Gls)
2005–2006	New Zealand Knights	12	(1)
2006	Kingston City FC	8	(1)
2007–2009	Changsha Ginde	74	(2)
2010–2011	Tianjin Teda	34	(2)
2012–2017	Beijing Guoan	43	(2)
2015	→ Chongqing Lifan (loan)	6	(0)
- * Club domestic league appearances and goals as of 4 November 2017

Zhang Xiaobin (simplified Chinese: 张晓彬; traditional Chinese: 張曉彬; pinyin: Zhāng Xiǎobīn; born February 14, 1985, in Zhangjiakou, Hebei) is a Chinese footballer.

== Club career ==
Zhang Xiaobin began his career as an attacking midfielder for the various Shaanxi Guoli youth teams. In 2001, when Shaanxi Guoli sent its youth team to train in Stockport, England, the club Stockport County F.C. would be impressed by the 16-year-old Zhang and take him on loan. While at Stockport Zhang spent three years rising through the youth and then reserve teams, however he was unable to break into the first team. After being unable to obtain a position on the first team of Stockport County, Zhang moved to the Australian league to start his professional senior career with A-League side New Zealand Knights where he made his debut against Queensland Roar on August 28, 2005, in the first game of the 2005–06 A-League season, which ended in a 2-0 defeat. Throughout the season the club would struggle within the league and Zhang was unable to establish himself as regular within the team, however during his time with the club he would go on to score his first goal against Adelaide United in a 1-1 draw before he left to join Kingston City FC for a short period until he finally moved back to China to play for top tier side Changsha Ginde.

At the beginning of the 2007 Chinese Super League Zhang joined Changsha Ginde where he would be gradually converted to a defensive midfielder and would eventually establish himself as vital member of the team while he aided the club to a tenth league standing at the end of the season. For the next several seasons Zhang was a vital player as Changsha continued to be a mid-table team; however, because of his consistency fellow top-tier team Tianjin Teda became interested in him and he transferred to them on 2 April 2010. His move was initially a big success and he was a vital member of the team that came second within the league; however, the next season saw the introduction of Song Chong-Gug and Zhang saw his playing significantly drop. When Tianjin Teda reached the final of the 2011 Chinese FA Cup, club manager Arie Haan dropped Zhang from the cup-winning team and Zhang left the club once Beijing Guoan showed an interest in him.

On 23 June 2015, Zhang was loaned to Chinese Super League side Chongqing Lifan until 31 December 2015.
