= 2011 Beijing Guoan F.C. season =

Beijing Guoan
2011 season
- Manager: Jaime Pacheco
- Stadium: Workers Stadium
- Super League: 2nd
- FA Cup: Semi-finals
- Average home league attendance: 40,397

The 2011 Beijing Guoan F.C. season was their 8th consecutive season in the Chinese Super League, established in the 2004, and 21st consecutive season in the top flight of Chinese football. They competed at the Chinese Super League and Chinese FA Cup.

== First team ==
As of July 8, 2011

Note: Flags indicate national team as defined under FIFA eligibility rules; some limited exceptions apply. Players may hold more than one non-FIFA nationality.

No.	Pos.	Nation	Player
1	GK	CHN	Zhang Sipeng
3	DF	CHN	Yu Yang
4	DF	CHN	Zhou Ting
5	MF	CRO	Darko Matić
6	MF	CHN	Xu Liang
7	MF	CHN	Wang Changqing
9	FW	CHN	Tan Tiancheng
12	GK	CHN	Hou Sen
13	DF	CHN	Xu Yunlong (Captain)
14	MF	CHN	Yang Yun
15	FW	HON	Walter Martínez
16	MF	CHN	Zhang Xizhe
17	MF	CHN	Xu Wu
18	MF	CHN	Lu Jiang
19	MF	CHN	Wang Xiaolong
20	DF	CHN	Zhang Xinxin
21	MF	CHN	Zhu Yifan
22	GK	CHN	Yang Zhi

No.	Pos.	Nation	Player
23	DF	CHN	Ding Haifeng
24	MF	CHN	Li Hanbo
25	DF	CHN	Jiang Tao
26	MF	CHN	Wang Hao
27	DF	CHN	Zhang Yonghai
28	MF	CHN	Wang Haozhi
29	FW	AUS	Joel Griffiths
30	DF	CHN	Lei Tenglong
31	FW	CHN	Hu Qiling
34	MF	CHN	Zhang Zhaohui
35	MF	CHN	Li Tixiang
36	DF	CHN	Zhang Junzhe
37	MF	CHN	Gao Teng
38	DF	CHN	Meng Yang
39	MF	CHN	Piao Cheng
40	DF	SEN	François
41	FW	SEN	Ladji Keita

== Transfers ==
=== Winter ===
In: Note: Flags indicate national team as defined under FIFA eligibility rules; some limited exceptions apply. Players may hold more than one non-FIFA nationality.

No.	Pos.	Nation	Player
3	DF	CHN	Yu Yang (loan return from Dalian Aerbin)
8	FW	BRA	Roberto (from (Greece) Asteras Tripolis)
10	FW	BRA	Davi (loan from (Qatar) Umm Salal)
39	MF	CHN	Piao Cheng (from Yanbian Baekdu Tigers)

Out: Note: Flags indicate national team as defined under FIFA eligibility rules; some limited exceptions apply. Players may hold more than one non-FIFA nationality.

No.	Pos.	Nation	Player
3	DF	CHN	Wu Hao (Released)
8	MF	CHN	Yang Hao (to Guangzhou Evergrande)
9	FW	CHN	Du Wenhui (to Jiangsu Sainty)
16	MF	CHN	Huang Bowen (to (South Korea) Jeonbuk Hyundai Motors)
17	MF	CHN	Wang Ke (Released)
21	MF	CHN	Yao Shuang (loan to Beijing Baxy)
23	FW	AUS	Ryan Griffiths (to (Australia) Newcastle United Jets)
25	MF	CHN	Xue Fei (loan to Beijing Baxy)
33	DF	SCO	Maurice Ross (to (Scotland) Motherwell F.C.)
-	MF	CHN	Sang Yifei (to Hubei Wuhan Zhongbo)
-	MF	CHN	Zou Yucheng (to Chongqing F.C.)
-	MF	CHN	Li Lei (to Beijing Baxy)
-	MF	CHN	Wang Wenan (to Beijing Baxy)
-	MF	CHN	Wen Bo (to Beijing Baxy)
-	MF	CHN	Wang Qiancheng (to Beijing Baxy)
-	MF	CHN	Tang Miao (to Shenzhen Phoenix)
-	MF	CHN	Luo Xi (to Shenzhen Ruby)
-	DF	CHN	Cao Bin (to Henan Construction)
-	DF	CHN	Yu Tianzhu (to Guizhou Zhicheng)
-	GK	CHN	Su Boyang (to Guizhou Zhicheng)

=== Summer ===
In: Note: Flags indicate national team as defined under FIFA eligibility rules; some limited exceptions apply. Players may hold more than one non-FIFA nationality.

No.	Pos.	Nation	Player
40	DF	SEN	Adama François Sene (from (Portugal) Vitória F.C.)
41	FW	SEN	Ladji Keita (loan from (Portugal) S.C. Braga)

Out: Note: Flags indicate national team as defined under FIFA eligibility rules; some limited exceptions apply. Players may hold more than one non-FIFA nationality.

No.	Pos.	Nation	Player
2	DF	CHN	Lang Zheng (loan to Nanchang Hengyuan)
8	FW	BRA	Roberto (to (Portugal) Gil Vicente F.C.)
10	FW	BRA	Davi (loan return to (Qatar) Umm Salal)
11	FW	CHN	Yan Xiangchuang (loan to Dalian Shide)
32	MF	CHN	Cui Yu (loan to Qingdao QUST)
33	DF	CHN	Ma Chongchong (loan to Sichuan FC)

== Competitions ==
=== Chinese Super League ===
Pos	Team	Pld	W	D	L	GF	GA	GD	Pts	Qualification or relegation
1	Guangzhou Evergrande (C)	30	20	8	2	67	23	+44	68	AFC Champions League group stage
2	Beijing Guoan	30	14	11	5	49	21	+28	53	AFC Champions League group stage
3	Liaoning Whowin	30	14	8	8	38	23	+15	50	AFC Champions League qualifying play-off (Note: Liaoning Whowin qualified for the 2012 AFC Champions League but withdrew from the tournament.)
4	Jiangsu Sainty	30	14	5	11	43	28	+15	47 (Note: Jiangsu, 3 pts, 2–1; Shandong, 3 pts, 1–2)	
5	Shandong Luneng	30	13	8	9	37	31	+6	47	

Updated to match(es) played on 2 November 2011. Source: http://csl.sina.com.cn/statistics/
Rules for classification: 1st points; 2nd head-to-head points; 3rd head-to-head goal difference; 4th head-to-head goals scored; 5th goal difference; 6th goals scored; 7th disciplinary points (1 point for each yellow card, 3 points for each red card). Head-to-Head: used when head-to-head record is used to rank tied teams.
(C) Champions
