= 2009 Beijing Guoan F.C. season =

Beijing Guoan
2008 season
- Manager: Lee Jang-soo (until 16 Sept); Hong Yuanshuo (16 Sept–)
- Stadium: Workers Stadium
- Super League: 1st
- AFC Champions League: Group stage
- Average home league attendance: 36,805

The 2009 Beijing Guoan F.C. season was the 6th consecutive season in the Chinese Super League, established in the 2004 season, and 19th consecutive season in the top flight of Chinese football. They competed at the Chinese Super League and AFC Champions League.

== First team ==
As of August 30, 2009

Note: Flags indicate national team as defined under FIFA eligibility rules; some limited exceptions apply. Players may hold more than one non-FIFA nationality.

No.	Pos.	Nation	Player
1	GK	CHN	Zhang Sipeng
2	DF	CHN	Lang Zheng
3	DF	CMR	William Paul
4	DF	CHN	Zhou Ting
5	MF	CRO	Darko Matić
6	MF	CHN	Sui Dongliang
7	MF	CHN	Wang Changqing
8	MF	CHN	Yang Pu
9	FW	CHN	Du Wenhui
10	MF	HON	Emil Martínez
11	MF	CHN	Yan Xiangchuang
12	GK	CHN	Zhang Lei
13	DF	CHN	Xu Yunlong (Captain)
14	MF	CHN	Wang Dong
15	MF	CHN	Tao Wei
16	MF	CHN	Huang Bowen
17	MF	CHN	Wang Ke
18	MF	CHN	Lu Jiang
19	MF	CHN	Yang Hao
20	MF	CHN	Zhang Xinxin
21	MF	CHN	Yao Shuang
22	GK	CHN	Yang Zhi
23	FW	AUS	Ryan Griffiths

No.	Pos.	Nation	Player
24	MF	CHN	Yang Yun
25	MF	CHN	Zhang Zhaohui
26	FW	CHN	Gao Dawei
27	DF	CHN	Yu Yang
28	FW	CHN	Guo Hui
29	FW	AUS	Joel Griffiths
30	DF	CHN	Zhang Yonghai
31	FW	CHN	Hu Qiling
32	FW	CHN	Yue Kaihao
33	MF	CHN	Wang Hao
34	GK	CHN	Hou Sen
35	MF	CHN	Xue Fei
36	MF	CHN	Zhu Yifan
37	MF	CHN	Li Tixiang
38	MF	CHN	Huang Jun
39	MF	CHN	Liu Teng
40	DF	CHN	Xu Huaiji
41	MF	CHN	Meng Yang
42	MF	CHN	Zhang Xizhe
43	FW	CHN	Yao Tiancheng
44	DF	CHN	Yao Yu
45	MF	CHN	Xiao Yiyang

== Friendlies ==
=== Mid–season ===
29 July 2009 2009 Barclays Asia Trophy	(China) Beijing Guoan	1–1 (4–5 p)	(England) Birmingham City	Beijing, China
	Paul 47'	Report	Geovanni 9'	Stadium: Workers Stadium; Attendance: 15,000; Referee: (China) T. Hai
	Penalties
	Wei (penalty scored); Ting (penalty scored); Bowen (penalty scored); Sui (penalty missed); Hui (penalty scored); Zhang (penalty missed)		(penalty scored) Devitt; (penalty scored) Dawson; (penalty scored) Cousin; (penalty missed) Marney; (penalty scored) Hughes; (penalty scored) Folan

31 July 2009 2009 Barclays Asia Trophy	(China) Beijing Guoan	0 – 2	(England) West Ham United	Beijing, China
		Report	Gabbidon 80'; Hines 90'	Stadium: Workers Stadium; Attendance: 7,501; Referee: (China) Sun Baojie
