= 2008 Beijing Guoan F.C. season =

Beijing Guoan
2008 season
- Manager: Lee Jang-soo
- Stadium: Beijing Fengtai Stadium
- Super League: 3rd
- AFC Champions League: Group stage
- Average home league attendance: 14,641

The 2008 Beijing Guoan F.C. season was their 5th consecutive season in the Chinese Super League, established in 2004, and 18th consecutive season in the top flight of Chinese football. They competed at the Chinese Super League and AFC Champions League.

== First team ==
As of March 27, 2008

Note: Flags indicate national team as defined under FIFA eligibility rules; some limited exceptions apply. Players may hold more than one non-FIFA nationality.

| No. | Pos. | Nation | Player |
|---|---|---|---|
| 1 | GK | (China) CHN | Zhang Sipeng |
| 2 | DF | (China) CHN | Lang Zheng |
| 3 | DF | (China) CHN | Zhang Shuai |
| 4 | DF | (China) CHN | Zhou Ting |
| 5 | MF | (China) CHN | Sang Yifei |
| 6 | MF | (China) CHN | Sui Dongliang |
| 7 | MF | (China) CHN | Wang Changqing |
| 8 | MF | (China) CHN | Yang Pu |
| 9 | FW | (China) CHN | Du Wenhui |
| 10 | FW | (Brazil) BRA | Tiago |
| 11 | FW | (China) CHN | Yan Xiangchuang |
| 12 | GK | (China) CHN | Cheng Yuelei |
| 13 | DF | (China) CHN | Xu Yunlong (Captain) |
| 14 | MF | (China) CHN | Wang Dong |
| 15 | MF | (China) CHN | Tao Wei |
| 16 | MF | (China) CHN | Huang Bowen |
| 17 | MF | (China) CHN | Wang Ke |
| 18 | MF | (China) CHN | Lu Jiang |
| 19 | MF | (China) CHN | Yang Hao |
| 20 | FW | (Honduras) HON | Walter Martínez |

| No. | Pos. | Nation | Player |
|---|---|---|---|
| 21 | MF | (China) CHN | Yao Shuang |
| 22 | GK | (China) CHN | Yang Zhi |
| 23 | FW | (China) CHN | Yue Kaihao |
| 24 | MF | (China) CHN | Yang Yun |
| 26 | DF | (China) CHN | Hao Qiang |
| 27 | DF | (China) CHN | Yu Yang |
| 28 | FW | (China) CHN | Guo Hui |
| 29 | FW | (China) CHN | Shang Yi |
| 30 | DF | (China) CHN | Zhang Yonghai |
| 31 | FW | (China) CHN | Hu Qiling |
| 32 | FW | (Honduras) HON | Elvis Scott |
| 33 | MF | (China) CHN | Wang Hao |
| 34 | GK | (China) CHN | Hou Sen |
| 35 | MF | (China) CHN | Xue Fei |
| 36 | MF | (China) CHN | Zhu Yifan |
| 37 | MF | (China) CHN | Liu Bo |
| 38 | MF | (China) CHN | Huang Jun |
| 39 | MF | (China) CHN | Liu Teng |
| 40 | DF | (China) CHN | Xu Huaiji |
| 41 | DF | (Romania) ROU | Ovidiu Burcă |
