= 2010 Beijing Guoan F.C. season =

Beijing Guoan
2010 season
- Manager: Hong Yuanshuo
- Stadium: Workers Stadium
- Super League: 5th
- AFC Champions League: Round of 16
- Average home league attendance: 33,342

The 2010 Beijing Guoan F.C. season was the 7th consecutive season in the Chinese Super League, established in 2004, and 20th consecutive season in the top flight of Chinese football. They competed at the Chinese Super League and AFC Champions League.

== First team ==
As of July 8, 2010

Note: Flags indicate national team as defined under FIFA eligibility rules; some limited exceptions apply. Players may hold more than one non-FIFA nationality.

No.	Pos.	Nation	Player
1	GK	CHN	Zhang Sipeng
2	DF	CHN	Lang Zheng
3	DF	CHN	Wu Hao
4	DF	CHN	Zhou Ting
5	MF	CRO	Darko Matić
6	MF	CHN	Xu Liang
7	MF	CHN	Wang Changqing
8	MF	CHN	Yang Hao
9	FW	CHN	Du Wenhui
11	FW	CHN	Yan Xiangchuang
12	GK	CHN	Hou Sen
13	DF	CHN	Xu Yunlong (Captain)
15	MF	CHN	Tao Wei
16	MF	CHN	Huang Bowen
17	MF	CHN	Wang Ke

No.	Pos.	Nation	Player
18	MF	CHN	Lu Jiang
19	MF	CHN	Wang Xiaolong
20	DF	CHN	Zhang Xinxin
21	MF	CHN	Yao Shuang
22	GK	CHN	Yang Zhi
23	FW	AUS	Ryan Griffiths
24	MF	CHN	Yang Yun
25	MF	CHN	Xue Fei
29	FW	AUS	Joel Griffiths
30	DF	CHN	Zhang Yonghai
31	FW	CHN	Hu Qiling
33	DF	SCO	Maurice Ross
35	FW	HON	Walter Martínez
36	MF	CHN	Zhu Yifan

== Transfers ==
=== Winter ===
In: Note: Flags indicate national team as defined under FIFA eligibility rules; some limited exceptions apply. Players may hold more than one non-FIFA nationality.

No.	Pos.	Nation	Player
3	DF	CHN	Wu Hao (from Shandong Luneng)
6	MF	CHN	Xu Liang (from Guangzhou F.C.)
19	MF	CHN	Wang Xiaolong (from Shandong Luneng)
10	FW	BRA	Valdo (from Hangzhou Greentown)
29	FW	AUS	Joel Griffiths (from (Australia) Newcastle United Jets)
33	DF	SCO	Maurice Ross (from (Scotland) Aberdeen)

Out: Note: Flags indicate national team as defined under FIFA eligibility rules; some limited exceptions apply. Players may hold more than one non-FIFA nationality.

No.	Pos.	Nation	Player
3	DF	CMR	Paul (Released)
10	MF	HON	Emil Martínez (to (Mexico) Indios de Ciudad Juárez)
29	FW	AUS	Joel Griffiths (loan return to (Australia) Newcastle United Jets)
8	MF	CHN	Yang Pu (Retired)
28	FW	CHN	Guo Hui (to Dalian Aerbin)
14	MF	CHN	Wang Dong (to Shenzhen Ruby)
-	FW	CHN	Zhang Xu (to Anhui Jiufang)
12	GK	CHN	Zhang Lei (to Changsha Ginde)

=== Summer ===
In: Note: Flags indicate national team as defined under FIFA eligibility rules; some limited exceptions apply. Players may hold more than one non-FIFA nationality.

No.	Pos.	Nation	Player
35	MF	HON	Walter Martínez (from (Honduras) C.D. Marathón)

Out: Note: Flags indicate national team as defined under FIFA eligibility rules; some limited exceptions apply. Players may hold more than one non-FIFA nationality.

No.	Pos.	Nation	Player
10	FW	BRA	Valdo (to (Japan) Shonan Bellmare)
32	DF	CHN	Yu Yang (loan to Dalian Aerbin)

== Friendlies ==
=== Mid–season ===
21 July 2010 Charity Match	Beijing Guoan	0–1	(England) Birmingham City	Beijing, China
11:30 UTC+0		Report	O'Connor 89'	Stadium: Beijing National Stadium; Attendance: c.70,000

8 August 2010 Asian Tour	Beijing Guoan	0–3	(Spain) Barcelona	Beijing, China
11:00 UTC+0		Report	Roberto 11'; Nolito 13'; Ibrahimović 90'	Stadium: Beijing National Stadium; Attendance: 44,000; Referee: Wang Zhe (China)
