= 2010 Northern Ireland Youth Soccer Tournament =

2010 Milk Cup
Tournament details
- Country: Northern Ireland
- Teams: 6 (Elite); 24 (Premier); 24 (Juniors)

The 2010 Northern Ireland Youth Soccer Tournament was the 2010 edition of a prestigious youth association football tournament that has been running annually since 1983. Teams from around the world competed in a week-long tournament in the North Coast area of Northern Ireland. The teams were divided into three categories: Elite, Premier, and Junior for Under-19s, Under-17s and Under-15s respectively. The 2010 Milk Cup Tournament ran between the 26 and 30 July 2010, with Northern Ireland (Elite), Manchester United (Premier) and Everton (Junior) all returning to defend their 2009 titles.

The Elite section had six teams in 2010, with each team playing two group matches. The top two teams in the table after the group stage competed in the final. Group matches were played on Monday and Wednesday, with the final and play-offs for positions taking part on the final day, Friday.

The Junior and Premier sections were contested by 24 teams. Each team played once on Monday and Tuesday as part of a league, from which the top 8 teams qualified for the Milk Cup quarter-finals on Wednesday. The remainder of the teams qualified for lower-level cups that ran alongside the Milk Cup, with quarter-finals on the Wednesday, semi-finals on Thursday, and the finals on Friday. In 2010, for the first time the finals night were held at the Ballymena Showgrounds, rather than the traditional venue of the Coleraine Showgrounds. There were a number of new teams competing this year, from Venezuela, Spain, Norway, China, Belgium and Israel amongst others.

- Elite – Under 19s – national sides
- Premier – Under 17s – club sides and national sides
- Junior – Under 15s – club sides and national sides

Clubs and national teams from anywhere in the world may compete on invitation, and in 2010 five continents were represented - Europe, North America, South America, Africa and Asia.

== Venues ==
Coleraine	Ballymena	Ballymoney	Broughshane	Castlerock
Anderson Park	Ballymena Showgrounds	Ballymoney Showgrounds	Broughshane	Castlerock
55.135993°N 6.668408°W	54.870288°N 6.266637°W	55.069324°N 6.501884°W	54.893352°N 6.210983°W	55.164029°N 6.789929°W
Coleraine	2010 Northern Ireland Youth Soccer Tournament is located in Northern Ireland			Ballymoney
Coleraine Showgrounds	2010 Northern Ireland Youth Soccer Tournament is located in Northern Ireland			Riada Stadium
55.1341166°N 6.661164°W	2010 Northern Ireland Youth Soccer Tournament is located in Northern Ireland			55.0654684°N 6.4980832°W
Limavady	2010 Northern Ireland Youth Soccer Tournament is located in Northern Ireland			Coleraine
Roe Mill	2010 Northern Ireland Youth Soccer Tournament is located in Northern Ireland			Rugby Avenue
55.0452723°N 6.9514446°W	2010 Northern Ireland Youth Soccer Tournament is located in Northern Ireland			55.1214725°N 6.6590948°W
Limavady	Mullaghacall	Portrush	Portstewart	Coleraine
Limavady Showgrounds	Mullaghacall	Parker Avenue	The Warren	University Coleraine
55.134°N 6.67°W	55.1770556°N 6.713689°W	55.186906°N 6.7150201°W	55.1499713°N 6.6684915°W	55.1970574°N 6.64941°W

== Elite Section ==
=== Squads ===
==== China ====
No.	Pos.	Player	Date of birth (age)	Caps	Club
12		Dong Jianhong			
3		Ma Chongchong			
5		Lei Tenglong			
6		Cai Shun			
15		Liu Yang			
7		Zhang Hongan			
20		Wang Tong			
14		Shi Ke			
11		Zou Yucheng			
16		Liu Binbin			
17		Gu Bin			
10		Peng Xinli			
18		Ji Chao			
19		Zhang Xizhe			
24		Bi Jinhao			
23		Men Yang			
21		Tan Tiancheng			

==== Denmark ====
No.	Pos.	Player	Date of birth (age)	Caps	Club
1	GK	Nicolai Larsen	9 March 1991 (aged 19)		(Denmark) Aalborg
2	DF	Mathias Reimer Larsen	20 May 1991 (aged 19)		(Denmark) Brøndby
3	DF	Mikkel Kirkeskov	5 September 1991 (aged 18)		(Denmark) AGF
4	DF	Erik Sviatchenko	4 October 1991 (aged 18)		(Denmark) Midtjylland
5	FW	Kevin Mensah	15 May 1991 (aged 19)		(Denmark) Viborg
6	MF	Kasper Hansen	15 February 1991 (aged 19)		(Denmark) Midtjylland
7	MF	Azad Corlu	12 January 1991 (aged 19)		(Denmark) Brøndby
8	DF	Mathias Nielsen	2 March 1991 (aged 19)		(Denmark) Nordsjælland
9	FW	Bjørn Paulsen	2 July 1991 (aged 19)		(Denmark) SønderjyskE
10	FW	David Boysen	30 April 1991 (aged 19)		(Denmark) Lyngby
11	FW	Rasmus Christensen	12 August 1991 (aged 18)		(Denmark) Midtjylland
12	DF	Daniel Høegh	6 January 1991 (aged 19)		(Denmark) OB
13	DF	Jesper Lauridsen	27 March 1991 (aged 19)		(Denmark) Midtjylland
14	MF	Jonas Rasmussen	1 August 1991 (aged 18)		(Denmark) Nordsjælland
15	MF	Marcel Rømer	8 August 1991 (aged 18)		(Denmark) Køge
16	GK	Michael Falkesgaard	9 April 1991 (aged 19)		(Denmark) Brøndby
17	MF	Kasper Kusk	10 November 1991 (aged 18)		(Denmark) AaB
18	MF	Mathias Wichmann	6 August 1991 (aged 18)		(Denmark) AaB

==== Japan ====
No.	Pos.	Player	Date of birth (age)	Caps	Club
1	GK	Goro Kawanami	10 April 1991 (aged 19)		(Japan) Kashiwa Reysol
2	DF	Masaki Tanaka	27 March 1991 (aged 19)		(Japan) Nippon Sport Science University
3	DF	Takumi Abe	26 May 1991 (aged 19)		(Japan) Yokohama F.C.
4	DF	Ryo Hiraide	18 July 1991 (aged 19)		(Japan) F.C. Tokyo
5	DF	Takuya Okamoto	18 June 1992 (aged 18)		(Japan) Urawa Red Diamonds
6	DF	Wataru Endo	9 February 1993 (aged 17)		(Japan) Shonan Bellmare
7	DF	Masahiro Teraoka	13 November 1991 (aged 18)		(Japan) Kansai University
8	MF	Mitsunari Musaka	16 January 1991 (aged 19)		(Japan) Chuo University
9	MF	Ibuki Fujita	30 January 1991 (aged 19)		(Japan) Keio University
10	MF	Naoyuki Yamazaki	5 May 1991 (aged 19)		(Japan) Tokyo Gakugei University
11	MF	Daisuke Kikuchi	12 April 1991 (aged 19)		(Japan) Thespa Kusatsu
12	MF	Masaru Kato	7 May 1991 (aged 19)		(Japan) Albirex Niigata
13	FW	Ryo Miyaichi	14 December 1992 (aged 17)		(Japan) Chukyou University Chukyou High School
14	MF	Shuto Kojima	30 July 1992 (aged 17)		(Japan) Maebashi Ikuei High School
15	FW	Kenyu Sugimoto	18 November 1992 (aged 17)		(Japan) Cerezo Osaka
16	FW	Kentaro Shigematsu	15 April 1991 (aged 19)		(Japan) F.C. Tokyo
17	FW	Toshiyuki Takagi	25 May 1991 (aged 19)		(Japan) Tokyo Verdy
18	GK	Hayato Nakamura	18 November 1991 (aged 18)		(Japan) Montedio Yamagata

==== Mexico ====
No.	Pos.	Player	Date of birth (age)	Caps	Club
1	GK	José Rodríguez	7 April 1992 (aged 17)		(Mexico) Guadalajara
6	DF	Miguel Basulto	7 January 1992 (aged 17)		(Mexico) Guadalajara
3	DF	Kristian Álvarez(c)	16 January 1992 (aged 17)		(Mexico) Guadalajara
18	DF	Diego Reyes	19 September 1992 (aged 17)		(Mexico) América
13	MF	Bryan Leyva	8 February 1992 (aged 17)		(United States) FC Dallas
6	MF	Manuel Alejandro Correa Galán	6 March 1992 (aged 17)		(Mexico) Club Atlas
4	DF	Jairo González	27 February 1992 (aged 17)		(Mexico) Guadalajara
8	MF	Carlos Emilio Orrantía	1 February 1991 (aged 18)		(Mexico) Pumas de la UNAM
10	FW	Víctor Mañon	6 February 1992 (aged 17)		(Mexico) Pachuca
9	FW	Martín Galván	14 February 1993 (aged 16)		(Mexico) Cruz Azul
11	FW	David Izazola Ramírez	23 October 1991 (aged 18)		(Mexico) Pumas de la UNAM
12	GK	Israel Cano	17 September 1992 (aged 17)		(Mexico) Monterrey
13	MF	Jesús Antonio Leal Bernal	18 December 1992 (aged 16)		(Mexico) América
14	MF	Luis Telles	9 March 1992 (aged 17)		(Mexico) Atlas
5	DF	Oscar García	14 February 1993 (aged 16)		(Mexico) Monterrey
16	FW	Ricardo Damián Martínez Castillo	8 June 1992 (aged 17)		(Mexico) Monterrey
17	FW	Luis Ernesto Olascoaga Reyes	22 August 1991 (aged 18)		(Mexico) América
18	FW	Erick Torres Padilla	19 January 1993 (aged 16)		(Mexico) Guadalajara

==== Northern Ireland ====
No.	Pos.	Player	Date of birth (age)	Caps	Club
1		Wayne Drummond			(Scotland) Rangers
2		Adam Thompson			(England) Watford
3		Dean Jarvis			(Scotland) Aberdeen
4		Patrick McLaughlin			
5		Craig Hill			
6		Chris Hegarty			(Scotland) Rangers
7		Jonathan Gorman			
8		Jonathan Breeze			(England) Wigan Athletic
9		William Grigg			(England) Walsall
10		James Gray			(England) Middlesbrough
11		Shane Ferguson		1	(England) Newcastle United
12		Andrew Dickey			
13		Aaron Burns			
14		Liam Bagnall			(England) Sunderland
15		Daniel Devine			
16		Scott Davidson			
17		Neil Dougan			
18		Michael McCrudden			

==== United States ====
Head coach Thomas Rongen announced the United States roster on July 19. Given age as of the first United States match on July 26.

No.	Pos.	Player	Date of birth (age)	Caps	Club
2	DF	Zarek Valentin	August 6, 1991 (aged 18)		(United States) Akron Zips
3	DF	Sacir Hot	June 10, 1991 (aged 19)		(United States) Boston College Eagles
5	DF	Greg Garza	August 16, 1991 (aged 18)		(Portugal) Estoril Praia
6	DF	Perry Kitchen	February 29, 1992 (aged 18)		(United States) Akron Zips
7	MF	Alex Molano	April 10, 1992 (aged 18)		(Croatia) Dinamo Zagreb
8	MF	Dillon Powers			(United States) Notre Dame Fighting Irish
9	FW	Omar Salgado	September 10, 1993 (aged 16)		(Canada) Vancouver Whitecaps FC
10	MF	Francisco Navas	November 17, 1991 (aged 18)		(United States) Houston Dynamo
12	MF	Conor Shanosky	December 13, 1991 (aged 18)		(United States) D.C. United
13	FW	Gustavo Ruelas	March 18, 1991 (aged 19)		(Mexico) Santos Laguna
14	MF	Fuad Ibrahim	August 15, 1991 (aged 18)		(Canada) Toronto FC
15	DF	Bryan de la Fuente	July 1, 1992 (aged 18)		(United States) Chivas USA
16	MF	Ernest Nungaray	May 7, 1992 (aged 18)		(Mexico) Monarcas Morelia
17	FW	Juan Agudelo	November 23, 1992 (aged 17)		(United States) New York Red Bulls
18	GK	Zac MacMath	August 7, 1991 (aged 18)		(United States) Maryland Terrapins
19	DF	Ethan White	January 1, 1992 (aged 18)		(United States) Maryland Terrapins
22	DF	Gale Agbossoumonde	November 17, 1991 (aged 18)		(Portugal) Braga
24	GK	Samir Badr			(Portugal) Porto

=== Tournament ===
Team	Pld	W	D	L	GF	GA	GD	Pts
United States	2	2	0	0	4	2	+2	6
Northern Ireland	2	1	1	0	6	1	+5	4
Mexico	2	1	1	0	4	2	+2	4
Denmark	2	1	0	1	6	4	+2	3
Japan	2	0	0	2	2	7	–5	0
China	2	0	0	2	0	6	–6	0

==== Group stage ====
26 July 2010
20:00

Japan	1–4	Denmark

Riada Stadium, Ballymoney

26 July 2010
20:00

Northern Ireland	1–1	Mexico

Coleraine Showgrounds

26 July 2010
20:00

United States	1–0	China

Ballymena Showgrounds

28 July 2010
20:00

China	0–5	Northern Ireland

Riada Stadium, Ballymoney

28 July 2010
20:00

Denmark	2–3	United States

Coleraine Showgrounds

28 July 2010
20:00

Mexico	3–1	Japan

Ballymena Showgrounds

==== 5th Place Playoff ====
30 July 2010
11:00

Japan	3–0	China

Riada Stadium, Ballymoney

==== 3rd Place Playoff ====
30 July 2010
13:00

Mexico	1–3	Denmark

Riada Stadium, Ballymoney

==== Final ====
30 July 2010
18:00

United States	3–0	Northern Ireland

Ballymena Showgrounds

== Premier section ==
- (Northern Ireland) County Antrim
- (Northern Ireland) County Armagh
- (Northern Ireland) County Down
- (Northern Ireland) County Fermanagh
- (Northern Ireland) County Londonderry
- (Northern Ireland) County Tyrone
- (Republic of Ireland) Shamrock Rovers
- (Republic of Ireland) Cherry Orchard
- (Republic of Ireland) Belvedere
- (Republic of Ireland) Donegal Schoolboys
- (Scotland) Queen of the South
- (England) Hartlepool United
- (England) Tottenham Hotspur
- (England) Bolton Wanderers
- (England) Manchester United
- (Belgium) KV Mechelen
- (Senegal) Etoile Lusitana
- (Qatar) Aspire
- (Portugal) FC Porto
- (Spain) Club Marcet
- (Venezuela) San Agustin
- (Brazil) Desportivo Brasil
- (Mexico) Cruz Azul
- (United States) South Coast Bayern

== Junior section ==
- (Qatar) Aspire Academy
- (Spain) Club Marcet
- (England) Brentford
- (England) Chelsea
- (Northern Ireland) County Antrim
- (Northern Ireland) County Armagh
- (Northern Ireland) County Down
- (Northern Ireland) County Fermanagh
- (Northern Ireland) County Londonderry
- (Northern Ireland) County Tyrone
- (Mexico) Cruz Azul
- (Republic of Ireland) Dundalk
- (England) Everton
- (Israel) Hapoel Be'er Sheva
- (Israel) Hapoel Haifa
- (Japan) Kashima Antlers
- (England) Plymouth Argyle
- (Mexico) Puebla
- (Scotland) Queen of the South
- (United States) South Coast Bayern
- (Russia) Spartak Moscow
- (England) Swindon Town
- (Norway) Våg
- (England) Watford
