= Huang Jun =

Huang Jun may refer to:

- Huang Jun (athlete) (born 2002), Chinese Paralympic athlete
- Huang Jun (author) (1890–1937), Chinese man of letters, author and spy
- Huang Jun (footballer) (born 1990), Chinese footballer
