= Beijing Guoan Talent Singapore FC =

Beijing Guoan Talent (S) 北京国安精英队
- Full name: Beijing Guoan Talent Singapore Football Club 北京国安足球俱乐部精英队(新加坡)
- Nickname: The Imperial Guards
- Founded: 2010
- Dissolved: 2011
- Ground: Yishun Stadium; Yishun, Singapore
- Capacity: 3,400
- League: S.League
- 2010: S.League, 10th of 12
Home colours

Beijing Guoan Talent Singapore Football Club (Chinese: 北京国安精英队) was a Chinese professional football club which was formed to play as a foreign team in Singapore's 2010 S.League. The club was a satellite team of the Chinese Super League club Beijing Guoan F.C. Players from Beijing Guoan's youth teams made up its S.League squad. Beijing Guoan (Singapore) became the ninth foreign team to compete in the S-League after Sinchi FC (2003), Albirex Niigata (2004), Sporting Afrique (2006), Liaoning Guangyuan and Super Reds (both 2007), Dalian Shide (2008), DPMM (2009) and Etoile FC (2010). In 2011, the Football Association of Singapore decided to replace them with Tanjong Pagar United.

== Last squad ==
Note: Flags indicate national team as defined under FIFA eligibility rules; some limited exceptions apply. Players may hold more than one non-FIFA nationality.

No.	Pos.	Nation	Player
1	DF	CHN	Yan Hai
2	DF	CHN	Yu Yang
3	DF	CHN	Zhang Xiaolong
4	DF	CHN	Yu Tianzhu
5	DF	CHN	Xu Huaiji
6	MF	CHN	Zhang Zhaohui
7	MF	CHN	Meng Yang
8	MF	CHN	Liu Teng
9	FW	CHN	Zhang Ye
10	FW	CHN	Li Tixiang
11	MF	CHN	Cui Yu
12	DF	CHN	Ma Chongchong
13	DF	CHN	Teng Bin

No.	Pos.	Nation	Player
14	DF	CHN	Lei Tenglong
15	MF	CHN	Zhao Yang
16	MF	CHN	Zou Yucheng
17	MF	CHN	Wang Haozhi
18	MF	CHN	Ding Haifeng
19	FW	CHN	Gao Teng
20	DF	CHN	Tang Miao
21	MF	CHN	Tang Xin
22	GK	CHN	Su Boyang
23	FW	CHN	Wang Hao
24	FW	CHN	Tan Tiancheng
25	MF	CHN	Zhang Xizhe
—	MF	CHN	Huang Jun

== Notable players ==
Notable players that plays in the Chinese Super League or the national team.

- (China) Li Tixiang
- (China) Ma Chongchong
- (China) Lei Tenglong
- (China) Ding Haifeng
- (China) Tang Miao
- (China) Tang Xin
- (China) Su Boyang
- (China) Wang Hao
- (China) Tan Tiancheng
- (China) Zhang Xizhe

== Seasons ==
Season	Pos	P	W	D	L	F	A	Pts	Singapore Cup	Singapore League Cup		
2010	10th	33	10	6	17	30	49	31	Singapore Cup	Singapore League Cup	Preliminary	Preliminary
