= Takuya Okamoto =

Japanese footballer

Takuya Okamoto 岡本 拓也
Personal information
- Full name: Takuya Okamoto
- Date of birth: 18 June 1992 (age 34)
- Place of birth: Saitama, Japan
- Height: 1.75 m (5 ft 9 in)
- Position: Right-back

Team information
- Current team: Fujieda MYFC
- Number: 6

Youth career
- Saido SSS
- 2005–2010: Urawa Red Diamonds

Senior career*
Years	Team	Apps	(Gls)
2010–2019	Urawa Red Diamonds	13	(0)
2013–2014	→ V-Varen Nagasaki (loan)	40	(0)
2016–2019	→ Shonan Bellmare (loan)	79	(7)
2019–2025	Shonan Bellmare	126	(8)
2025	Perth Glory	6	(0)
2025–2026	Oita Trinita	18	(1)
2026–	Fujieda MYFC	1	(0)

International career^{‡}
2009	Japan U17	3	(0)
2010	Japan U19	13	(0)
2011	Japan U22	2	(0)
- * Club domestic league appearances and goals as of 13 August 2026 ‡ National team caps and goals as of 29 March 2011

Takuya Okamoto (岡本 拓也, Okamoto Takuya; born 18 June 1992) is a Japanese footballer who plays as right-back for Fujieda MYFC.

Okamoto started his career at Urawa Red Diamonds before going out on loan to V-Varen Nagasaki and Shonan Bellmare. He became a regular player for Shonan Bellmare, playing over 150 matches for the club before moving to Australia to join Perth Glory. After his contract expired, he joined Oita Trinita as a free agent.

== Career ==
On 7 January 2016, Okamoto was announced on a one year loan deal to Shonan Bellmare.

On 16 January 2025, Okamoto was announced at Perth Glory, alongside fellow Japanese player Yuto Misao. On 30 June 2025, he left the club after his contract expired.

== International career ==
In October 2009, Okamoto was selected for the Japan U-17 national team for the 2009 U-17 World Cup. He played in all 3 matches as a center back.

== Personal life ==
In February 2018, Okamoto announced his marriage to his wife.

== Club statistics ==
Updated to 7 August 2022.

Club	Season	League		Emperor's Cup		J. League Cup		AFC		Total	
Club	Season	Apps	Goals	Apps	Goals	Apps	Goals	Apps	Goals	Apps	Goals
Urawa Red Diamonds	2010	9	0	2	0	1	0	-		12	0
Urawa Red Diamonds	2011	1	0	2	0	0	0	-		3	0
Urawa Red Diamonds	2012	0	0	0	0	1	0	-		1	0
Urawa Red Diamonds	2013	0	0	-		0	0	0	0	0	0
V-Varen Nagasaki	2013	14	0	1	0	-		-		15	0
V-Varen Nagasaki	2014	26	0	3	0	-		-		29	0
Urawa Red Diamonds	2015	3	0	0	0	0	0	1	0	4	0
Shonan Bellmare	2016	21	1	2	0	6	0	-		29	1
Shonan Bellmare	2017	30	3	0	0	-		-		30	3
Shonan Bellmare	2018	28	3	2	0	7	1	-		37	4
Shonan Bellmare	2019	22	0	0	0	1	0	-		23	0
Shonan Bellmare	2020	33	4	-		0	0	-		33	4
Shonan Bellmare	2021	37	4	1	0	2	0	-		40	4
Shonan Bellmare	2022	5	0	0	0	0	0	-		5	0
Total		229	15	13	0	18	1	1	0	261	16

=== National team statistics ===
National team	Year	Apps	Goals
Japan U17
Japan U17	2009	3	0
Japan U17	Total	3	0
Japan U19
Japan U19	2010	13	0
Japan U19	Total	13	0
Japan U22
Japan U22	2011	2	0
Japan U22	Total	2	0

International appearances and goals
#	Date	Venue	Opponent	Result	Goal	Competition
2009
	24 October	Teslim Balogun Stadium, Lagos	Brazil U17	2–3	0	2009 FIFA U-17 World Cup / Japan U17
	27 October	Teslim Balogun Stadium, Lagos	Switzerland U17	3–4	0	2009 FIFA U-17 World Cup / Japan U17
	30 October	Teslim Balogun Stadium, Lagos	Mexico U17	0–2	0	2009 FIFA U-17 World Cup / Japan U17
2010
	18 May	Odin, Heemskerk	Canada U19	0–0	0	Friendly / Japan U19
	20 May	VV Assendelft, Assendelft	Senegal U19	0–1	0	Friendly / Japan U19
	22 May	Sportpark de Koog, Uitgeest	United States U19	2–1	0	2010 International Cor Groenewegen Tournament / Japan U19
	22 May	Sportpark de Koog, Uitgeest	(Brazil) Atlético Mineiro	0–0	0	2010 International Cor Groenewegen Tournament / Japan U19 Unofficial
	24 May	Sportpark de Koog, Uitgeest	(Belgium) Sporting Lokeren	3–0	0	2010 International Cor Groenewegen Tournament / Japan U19 Unofficial
	24 May	Sportpark de Koog, Uitgeest	(Netherlands) FC Twente	2–0	0	2010 International Cor Groenewegen Tournament / Japan U19 Unofficial
	24 May	Sportpark de Koog, Uitgeest	South Korea U20	0–1	0	2010 International Cor Groenewegen Tournament / Japan U19
	20 June	Ekbatan Stadium Tehran, Tehran	Iran U19	2–1	0	Friendly / Japan U19
	27 June	Weifang Sports Center Stadium, Weifang	China PR U19	0–1	0	Friendly / Japan U19
	28 July	Ballymena Showgrounds, Ballymoney	Mexico U19	1–3	0	2010 Milk Cup / Japan U19
	30 July	Riada Stadium, Ballymoney	China PR U19	3–0	0	2010 Milk Cup / Japan U19
	21 August	Kusanagi Sports Park Stadium, Shizuoka	Spain U19	2–0	0	2010 SBS Cup / Japan U19
	22 August	Fujieda Sports Complex Park, Shizuoka	Ghana U19	4–1	0	2010 SBS Cup / Japan U19
	24 August	Ecopa Stadium, Shizuoka	(Japan) Shizuoka Youth	4–3	0	2010 SBS Cup / Japan U19
	9 September	Sendai Stadium, Miyagi	France U19	2–1	0	2010 Sendai Cup / Japan U19
	11 September	Sendai Stadium, Miyagi	Brazil U19	0–1	0	2010 Sendai Cup / Japan U19
	12 September	Sendai Stadium, Miyagi	China PR U19	4–0	0	2010 Sendai Cup / Japan U19
2011
	9 February	Mohammed Al-Hamad Stadium, Hawalli	Kuwait	0–3	0	Friendly / Japan U22
	29 March	JAR Stadium, Tashkent	Uzbekistan U22	2–1	0	Friendly / Japan U22
