= Lang Zheng =

Chinese footballer

Lang Zheng[郎征]
Personal information
- Full name: Lang Zheng
- Date of birth: 22 July 1986 (age 40)
- Place of birth: Baoding, Hebei, China
- Height: 1.88 m (6 ft 2 in)
- Position: Defender

Youth career
- 2000–2005: Hebei Youth

Senior career*
Years	Team	Apps	(Gls)
2006–2016	Beijing Guoan	107	(3)
2011	→ Nanchang Hengyuan (loan)	8	(1)
2017–2018	Hebei China Fortune	0	(0)
2017	→ Liaoning Whowin (loan)	19	(0)
Total		134	(4)

International career
2011–2013	China	4	(0)

Managerial career
- 2019-2023: Hebei FC (team manager)
- 2023-2024: Langfang Glory City (assistant)
Medal record
Representing China
Men's football
AFC U-17 Championship
Bronze medal – third place	2002 UAE	Team
- * Club domestic league appearances and goals

Lang Zheng (Chinese: 郎征; pinyin: Láng Zhēng; born 22 July 1986) is a Chinese football coach and retired footballer.

== Club career ==
Lang Zheng started his football career when he joined Beijing Guoan in the 2006 season and would eventually make his debut against Changchun Yatai on 15 October 2006 in a 1–0 win, coming on as a late substitute. By the 2007 league season, he would continue to further establish himself within the team when he started his first league game on 16 June 2007 against Tianjin Teda, which Beijing lost 1–0. He would remain a squad regular until the 2009 league season when he would eventually break into the first team and help Beijing win the league title as well as also scoring his first goal against Qingdao Jonoon on 26 September 2009 in a 1–0 victory.

After spending several seasons behind Xu Yunlong and Zhang Yonghai in the defense, then manager Jaime Pacheco would promote youngsters Lei Tenglong and Yu Yang into the senior squad and after making only three appearances for the team during the 2011 league season, Lang was allowed to go on loan to Nanchang Hengyuan during the season. Lang was brought in to help the club fight off relegation and he would go on to make his debut against Hangzhou Greentown on 10 July 2011 where he came on as a late substitute in a 1–0 win. He would make several further appearances for Nanchang and even scored a goal against Shaanxi Chanba in a 3–1 win on 23 October 2011 to help the club stay in the top tier.

On 13 January 2017, Lang transferred to his hometown club Hebei China Fortune with his teammate Zhang Chengdong. He was then loaned to Liaoning Whowin for the 2017 season on 22 January 2017. He made his debut for Liaoning on 3 March 2017 in a 1–1 away draw against Guizhou Zhicheng. Lang returned to Hebei China Fortune in 2018 but failed to play for the club due to lingering injury.

On 8 March 2019, Hebei China Fortune announced Lang's retirement and appointed him as the head of club's disciplinary committee.

== International career ==
On 26 March 2011, Lang made his international debut in a 2–2 draw against Costa Rica in an experimental team that also saw Jin Jingdao, Lü Peng, Ma Chongchong, Ye Weichao and Zhang Xizhe make their first appearances.

== Career statistics ==
As of 9 November 2018.

Season	Club	League	League		CFA Cup		CSL Cup		Asia		Total	
Season	Club	League	Apps	Goals	Apps	Goals	Apps	Goals	Apps	Goals	Apps	Goals
2006	Beijing Guoan	Chinese Super League	2	0		0	-		-		2	0
2007	Beijing Guoan	Chinese Super League	3	0	-		-		-		3	0
2008	Beijing Guoan	Chinese Super League	9	0	-		-		2	0	11	0
2009	Beijing Guoan	Chinese Super League	16	1	-		-		3	0	19	1
2010	Beijing Guoan	Chinese Super League	18	0	-		-		5	0	23	0
2011	Beijing Guoan	Chinese Super League	3	0	0	0	-		-		3	0
2011	Nanchang Hengyuan (Loan)	Chinese Super League	8	1	0	0	-		-		8	1
2012	Beijing Guoan	Chinese Super League	12	0	0	0	-		3	0	15	0
2013	Beijing Guoan	Chinese Super League	23	1	3	0	-		8	1	34	2
2014	Beijing Guoan	Chinese Super League	10	1	3	0	-		3	0	16	1
2015	Beijing Guoan	Chinese Super League	9	0	1	0	-		6	0	16	0
2016	Beijing Guoan	Chinese Super League	2	0	0	0	-		-		2	0
2017	Liaoning Whowin (Loan)	Chinese Super League	19	0	0	0	-		-		19	0
2018	Hebei China Fortune	Chinese Super League	0	0	0	0	-		-		0	0
Total			134	4	7	0	0	0	30	1	171	5

== Honours ==
=== Club ===
Beijing Guoan

- Chinese Super League: 2009
