= Ma Chongchong =

Chinese footballer

Ma Chongchong 马冲冲
Personal information
- Full name: Ma Chongchong
- Date of birth: 17 January 1991 (age 35)
- Place of birth: Luoyang, Henan, China
- Height: 1.83 m (6 ft 0 in)
- Positions: Centre-back; left-back

Team information
- Current team: Guizhou Guiyang Athletic
- Number: 25

Youth career
- 2005–2010: Beijing Guoan

Senior career*
Years	Team	Apps	(Gls)
2010	Beijing Guoan Talent (loan)	14	(1)
2011	Beijing Guoan	0	(0)
2011	→ Sichuan Dujiangyan Symbol (loan)	12	(0)
2012–2014	Henan Jianye	6	(0)
2014	→ Chengdu Tiancheng (loan)	25	(0)
2015–2016	Jiangxi Liansheng	51	(1)
2017–2019	Sichuan Longfor	82	(4)
2020	Shijiazhuang Ever Bright	1	(0)
2021	Shanxi Longjin	8	(0)
2022–2023	Jinan Xingzhou	44	(0)
2024–2025	Shijiazhuang Gongfu	54	(0)
2026–	Guizhou Guiyang Athletic	0	(0)

International career^{‡}
2009–2010	China U-20	7	(0)
2011	China	1	(0)
- * Club domestic league appearances and goals as of 6 January 2023 ‡ National team caps and goals as of 4 April 2011

Ma Chongchong (Chinese: 马冲冲; born 17 January 1991) is a professional Chinese football player who currently plays as a centre-back or left-back for Guizhou Guiyang Athletic.

== Club career ==
Ma Chongchong started his football career playing for the various Beijing Guoan youth teams and was loaned to out to Beijing's own satellite team Beijing Guoan Talent, which played as a foreign team in Singapore's S.League in the 2010 league season. He went on to make his senior debut in a league game against Balestier Khalsa FC on 24 March 2010 in a 1–0 defeat. After establishing himself as a regular member of the team he scored his first senior goal on 29 April 2010 in a league game against Woodlands Wellington FC in a 2–1 victory. By the end of the season, he returned to Beijing Guoan at the start of the 2011 league season and went on to be promoted into the senior team.

In February 2014, Ma moved to China League One club Chengdu Tiancheng on a one-year loan deal.

In February 2015, Ma transferred to China League One club Jiangxi Liansheng. On 20 January 2017, Ma moved to League Two club Sichuan Longfor. At Sichuan, Ma would go on to establish himself as an integral member of the team and at the end of the 2018 China League Two season go on to aid the club as they went on to win the division title and promotion to the second tier. After three seasons with the club he transferred to newly promoted top-tier club Shijiazhuang Ever Bright on 17 July 2020. He would make his debut on 7 August 2020 in a league game against Wuhan Zall that ended in a 2–1 defeat.

== International career ==
Ma Chongchong was called up into the Chinese U-20's squad in 2009 to take part in the 2010 AFC U-19 Championship qualification process, which saw him play in every game while China topped the group. He was included in the squad that took part in the 2010 AFC U-19 Championship, however he had to fight for his place within the team and had to wait until the final group game against Thailand in a 1–1 draw before he saw any playing time within the campaign. His performance was good enough for him to be included in the team that played North Korea in the quarter-finals in a game that China lost 2–0. On 26 March 2011 the Chinese head coach Gao Hongbo decided to promote Ma into the senior team for a friendly against Costa Rica in an experimental team in which Lang Zheng, Jin Jingdao, Lü Peng, Ye Weichao and Zhang Xizhe also made their first appearances in a game that ended in 2–2 draw.

== Career statistics ==
Statistics accurate as of match played 6 January 2023.

Appearances and goals by club, season and competition
Club	Season	League			National Cup		League Cup		Continental		Other		Total	
Club	Season	Division	Apps	Goals	Apps	Goals	Apps	Goals	Apps	Goals	Apps	Goals	Apps	Goals
Beijing Guoan Talent (loan)	2010	S. League	14	1	1	0	1	0	-		-		16	1
Beijing Guoan	2011	Chinese Super League	0	0	0	0	-		-		-		0	0
Sichuan Dujiangyan Symbol (loan)	2011	China League Two	12	0	0	0	-		-		-		12	0
Henan Jianye	2012	Chinese Super League	0	0	1	0	-		-		-		1	0
Henan Jianye	2013	China League One	6	0	2	0	-		-		-		8	0
Henan Jianye	Total		6	0	3	0	0	0	0	0	0	0	9	0
Chengdu Tiancheng (loan)	2014	China League One	25	0	0	0	-		-		-		25	0
Jiangxi Liansheng	2015	China League One	29	0	2	0	-		-		-		31	0
Jiangxi Liansheng	2016	China League Two	22	1	1	0	-		-		-		23	1
Jiangxi Liansheng	Total		51	1	3	0	0	0	0	0	0	0	54	1
Sichuan Longfor	2017	China League Two	22	1	1	0	-		-		-		23	1
Sichuan Longfor	2018	China League Two	28	2	3	0	-		-		-		31	2
Sichuan Longfor	2019	China League One	30	0	0	0	-		-		2 (Note: Appearances in 2019 China League One relegation play-off games)	0	32	0
Sichuan Longfor	Total		80	3	4	0	0	0	0	0	2	0	86	3
Shijiazhuang Ever Bright	2020	Chinese Super League	1	0	1	0	-		-		-		2	0
Shanxi Longjin	2021	China League Two	8	0	1	0	-		-		-		9	0
Jinan Xingzhou	2022	China League Two	15	0	3	0	-		-		-		18	0
Career total			212	5	16	0	1	0	0	0	2	0	231	5

== Honours ==
=== Club ===
Henan Jianye

- China League One: 2013

Sichuan Longfor

- China League Two: 2018

Jinan Xingzhou

- China League Two: 2022
