= Huang Jun (author) =

Chinese writer (1890–1937)

Huang Jun (Chinese: 黄濬; 1890–1937), Courtesy name Qiuyue(秋嶽), Art name Huangsuirensheng An(花隨人聖庵) was a Chinese man of letters, author and spy. He was known for his collection of late Qing dynasty anecdotes "Huasuirensheng An Zhiyi" (花随人聖庵摭憶).

Huang was born in a prestigious family from Fuzhou. His father Huang Yanhong was a juren. After the cession of Taiwan to Japan, his family moved to Beijing. At the age of 17, Huang graduated from the Imperial University of Peking (later known as Peking University) and obtained the degree of juren. Later, Huang studied at Waseda University in Japan.

In August 1932, he was appointed the secretary at the Executive Yuan. In 1935, with the recommendation of Lin Sen, Huang started attending the confidential meetings of the government of Republic of China as a scribe.

Following the leak of Chiang Kai-shek’s plan to prevent the Japanese army from advancing southward in 1937, investigator Gu Zhenglun attributed the espionage to Huang. According to popular folklore, Huang became a spy for Japanese intelligence in the early stages of World War II after being honey-trapped by an agent identified as Nanzo Kumoko (also known as Nanzo Kunko), although the existence of such an agent is disputed and the circumstances of his defection to Japan was unclear.

In August 1937, Huang was convicted of treason and executed along with his son Huang Sheng and others who helped him retrieving confidential information.

As a writer, Huang's body of works was critically acclaimed by historians such as Fang Zhaoying and Chen Yinke.
