= Li Tixiang =

Chinese footballer (born 1989)

Li Tixiang 李提香
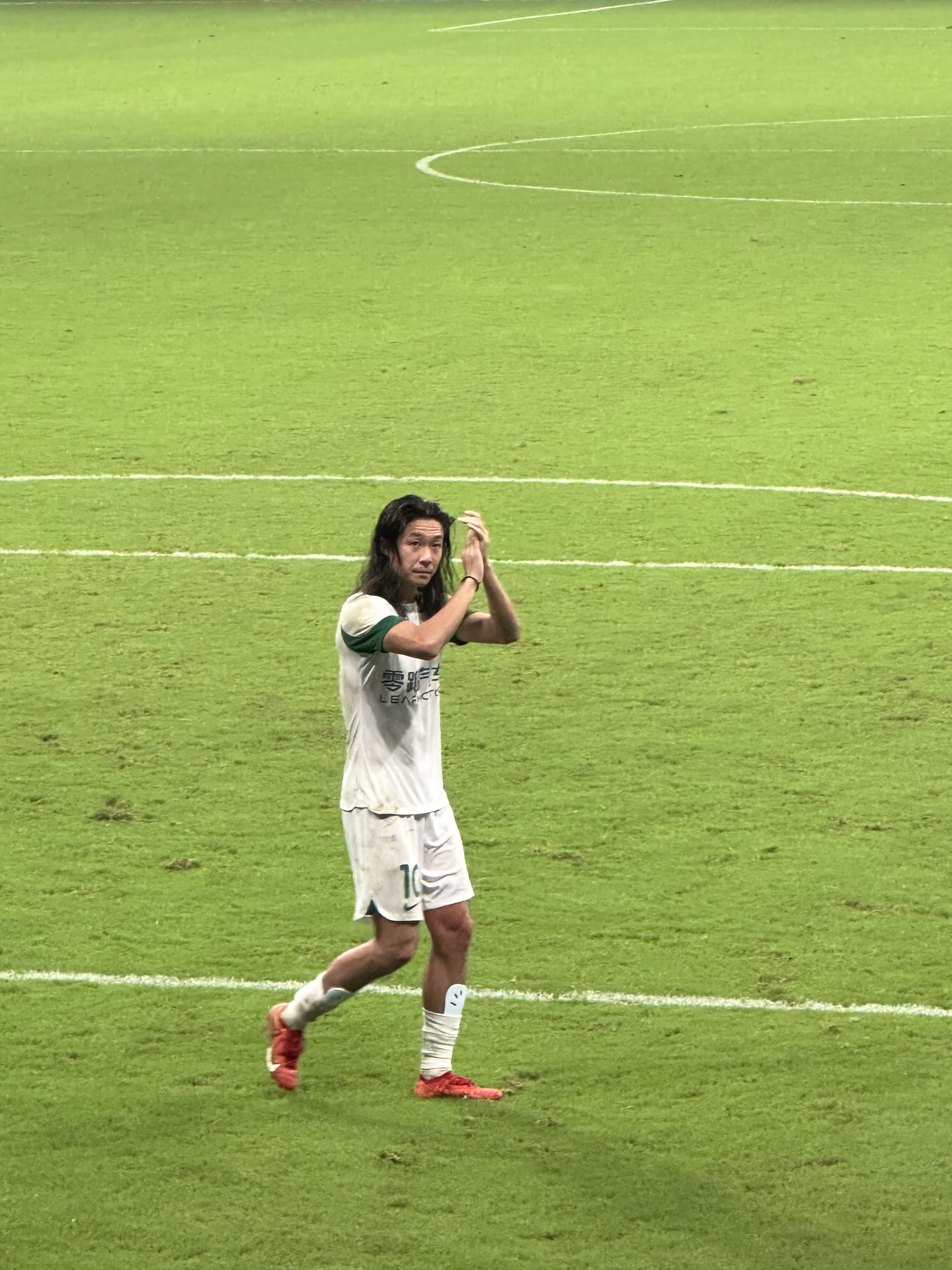
- Li in 2024

Personal information
- Date of birth: 1 September 1989 (age 37)
- Place of birth: Tangshan, Hebei, China
- Height: 1.81 m (5 ft 11 in)
- Positions: Midfielder; centre-back

Team information
- Current team: Liaoning Tieren
- Number: 18

Youth career
- 2004–2009: Beijing Guoan

Senior career*
Years	Team	Apps	(Gls)
2009–2016	Beijing Guoan	19	(0)
2010	→ Beijing Guoan Talent (loan)	31	(1)
2014	→ Tondela (loan)	1	(0)
2016	Shijiazhuang Ever Bright	9	(0)
2017–2022	Guangzhou City	118	(2)
2023–2025	Zhejiang FC	85	(0)
2026–	Liaoning Tieren	30	(0)
- * Club domestic league appearances and goals as of 22 November 2026

Li Tixiang (Chinese: 李提香; pinyin: Lǐ Tíxiāng; Mandarin pronunciation: [lì tʰǐ ɕjáŋ]; born 1 September 1989) is a Chinese footballer who plays as a midfielder or centre-back for Chinese Super League club Liaoning Tieren.

== Career ==
Li started his football career in 2009 when he was promoted to Beijing Guoan's first team squad. The following season in an attempt to gain more playing time Li was loaned to Beijing Guoan's satellite team Beijing Guoan Talent, which would play as a foreign team in Singapore's S.League in 2010. Wearing the number 10 shirt, Li served as the key player of the team. He made his senior debut in a 1–0 home defeat against Étoile FC on 12 February 2010. He scored his first senior goal in the first round of 2010 Singapore Cup which Beijing Guoan Talent lost to invited foreign team Kitchee from Hong Kong 2–1. On 7 September, the club was involved in a brawl during a match with Young Lions at Jalan Besar Stadium. Li was fined S$2,500 by Football Association of Singapore (FAS) for participating the brawl. He scored his first senior league goal on 19 October in a 3–1 home defeat against Albirex Niigata (Singapore).

Li returned to Beijing Guoan in 2011. On 25 May, he made his debut for Beijing Guoan on the third round of 2011 Chinese FA Cup which Beijing beat Nanchang Hengyuan 6–1 at Workers Stadium, coming on as a substitute for Zhang Xizhe in the 46th minute. His first Super League debut came on 2 July in a match against Shaanxi Renhe coming on as substitute for Piao Cheng in a 1–1 draw.

In January 2014, Li was loaned to Segunda Liga side Tondela until the end of 2013–14 season. However, he failed to establish himself within the team and played just one match in the final round of the season which Tondela lost to Moreirense 1–0 on 11 May 2014. Tondela officially announced Li's departure on 12 May 2014.

On 14 July 2016, Li transferred to Chinese Super League side Shijiazhuang Ever Bright. He made his debut for Shijiazhuang on 31 July 2016 in a Hebei Derby match against Hebei China Fortune. He played nine matches for Shijiazhuang in the second half of the season.

On 19 November 2016, Li moved to fellow Super League side Guangzhou R&F on a free transfer after Shijiazhuang relegated to the second tier. He made his debut for the club on 1 April 2017 in a 1–0 away victory against Yanbian Funde, coming on as a substitute for Chen Zhizhao in the 62nd minute. On 18 June 2017, Li was involved in a collision and was sent off during a league match with Shanghai SIPG. He received a ban of 5 matches by the Chinese Football Association.

After six seasons at Guangzhou he would join another top tier club in Zhejiang FC on 18 January 2023. On 19 December 2025, the club announced Li's departure after the 2025 season.

On 21 December 2025, Li signed Chinese Super League club Liaoning Tieren in 2026 season.

== Personal life ==
Li's given name, Tixiang, comes from the Chinese translation of Italian painter Titian (Chinese: 提香).

== Career statistics ==
As of match played 22 November 2025

Appearances and goals by club, season and competition
Club	Season	League			National cup		League cup		Continental		Total	
Club	Season	Division	Apps	Goals	Apps	Goals	Apps	Goals	Apps	Goals	Apps	Goals
Beijing Guoan	2009	Chinese Super League	0	0	–		–		0	0	0	0
Beijing Guoan	2011	Chinese Super League	2	0	1	0	–		–		3	0
Beijing Guoan	2012	Chinese Super League	6	0	0	0	–		0	0	6	0
Beijing Guoan	2013	Chinese Super League	10	0	1	0	–		2	0	13	0
Beijing Guoan	2014	Chinese Super League	0	0	0	0	–		0	0	0	0
Beijing Guoan	2015	Chinese Super League	1	0	2	0	–		1	0	4	0
Beijing Guoan	2016	Chinese Super League	0	0	2	0	–		–		2	0
Beijing Guoan	Total		19	0	6	0	0	0	3	0	28	0
Beijing Guoan Talent (loan)	2010	S. League	31	1	1	1	1	0	–		33	2
Tondela (loan)	2013–14	Segunda Liga	1	0	0	0	0	0	–		1	0
Shijiazhuang Ever Bright	2016	Chinese Super League	9	0	0	0	–		–		9	0
Guangzhou R&F	2017	Chinese Super League	18	0	3	0	–		–		21	0
Guangzhou R&F	2018	Chinese Super League	26	0	5	0	–		–		31	0
Guangzhou R&F	2019	Chinese Super League	15	0	1	0	–		–		16	0
Guangzhou R&F	2020	Chinese Super League	14	0	3	0	–		–		17	0
Guangzhou R&F	2021	Chinese Super League	18	1	1	0	–		–		19	1
Guangzhou R&F	2022	Chinese Super League	27	1	1	0	–		–		28	1
Guangzhou R&F	Total		118	2	14	0	0	0	0	0	132	2
Zhejiang FC	2023	Chinese Super League	28	0	2	1	–		7	0	37	1
Zhejiang FC	2024	Chinese Super League	28	0	1	0	–		6	0	35	0
Zhejiang FC	2025	Chinese Super League	29	0	2	0	–		–		31	0
Zhejiang FC	Total		85	0	5	1	0	0	13	0	103	1
Career total			263	3	26	2	1	0	16	0	306	5
