= Ding Haifeng =

Chinese footballer

Ding Haifeng 丁海峰
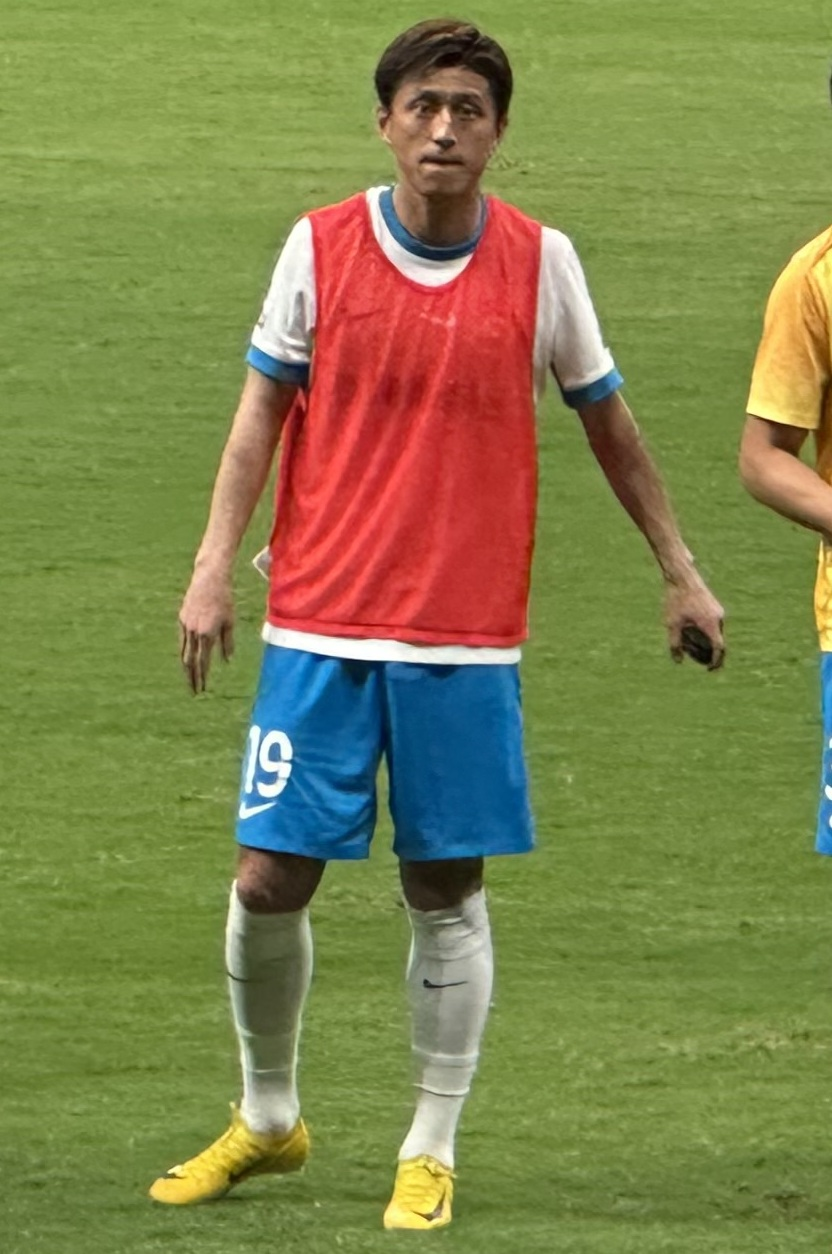
- Ding Haifeng in June 2025

Personal information
- Full name: Ding Haifeng
- Date of birth: 17 July 1991 (age 35)
- Place of birth: Handan, Hebei, China
- Height: 1.82 m (5 ft 11 1/2 in)
- Position: Left-back

Team information
- Current team: Qingdao West Coast
- Number: 32

Youth career
- 2006–2010: Beijing Guoan

Senior career*
Years	Team	Apps	(Gls)
2010	Beijing Guoan Talent	6	(0)
2011	Beijing Guoan	0	(0)
2012–2013	Shenzhen Ruby	46	(1)
2014–2015	Liaoning Whowin	44	(2)
2016–2017	Hebei China Fortune	43	(0)
2018–2019	Guangzhou R&F	38	(0)
2020–2022	Hebei FC	37	(2)
2023	Shijiazhuang Gongfu	22	(0)
2024	Tianjin Jinmen Tiger	3	(0)
2024	→ Henan FC (loan)	7	(0)
2025–	Qingdao West Coast	17	(0)

International career^{‡}
2016	China	1	(0)
- * Club domestic league appearances and goals as of 31 May 2026 ‡ National team caps and goals as of 17 September 2016

Ding Haifeng (Chinese: 丁海峰; pinyin: Dīng Hǎifēng; born 17 July 1991) is a Chinese footballer who currently plays for Qingdao West Coast in the Chinese Super League.

== Club career ==
Ding Haifeng started his football career playing Beijing Guoan's youth academy in 2006. He was then loaned to S.League side Beijing Guoan Talent during the 2010 season. He made his debut for the club on 23 June 2010 in a 2-1 loss against Singapore Armed Forces FC on 23 June 2010. Ding returned to Beijing Guoan during the 2011 season and he was subsequently promoted to the club's first team. On 29 February 2012, Ding transferred to China League One side Shenzhen Ruby after failing to establish himself within the team. He made his debut for the club on 17 March 2012 in a 1-0 win against Beijing Baxy.

On 28 February 2014, Ding transferred to Chinese Super League side Liaoning Whowin. He made his league debut for Liaoning on 20 April 2014 in a game against Tianjin Teda, coming on as a substitute for James Chamanga in the 24th minute. The following season, he would establish himself as the club's first choice left back within the team and on 24 May 2015 he would score his first goal for the club in a league game against Chongqing Lifan F.C. in a 1-1 draw.

On 6 January 2016, Ding transferred to Super League newcomer Hebei China Fortune. He made his debut for the club on 4 March 2016 in a 2-1 win against Guangzhou R&F.

On 22 February 2018, Ding transferred to fellow Super League side Guangzhou R&F with a five-year contract.

== International career ==
Ding made his debut for the Chinese national team on 3 June 2016 in a 4-2 win against Trinidad and Tobago.

== Career statistics ==
As of match played 19 June 2026.

Appearances and goals by club, season and competition
Club	Season	League			National Cup		League Cup		Continental		Total	
Club	Season	Division	Apps	Goals	Apps	Goals	Apps	Goals	Apps	Goals	Apps	Goals
Beijing Guoan Talent	2010	S.League	6	0	0	0	0	0	0	0	6	0
Beijing Guoan	2011	Chinese Super League	0	0	0	0	-		0	0	0	0
Shenzhen Ruby	2012	China League One	26	1	2	0	-		-		28	1
Shenzhen Ruby	2013	China League One	20	0	2	0	-		-		22	0
Shenzhen Ruby	Total		46	1	4	0	0	0	0	0	50	1
Liaoning FC	2014	Chinese Super League	17	0	0	0	-		-		17	0
Liaoning FC	2015	Chinese Super League	27	2	1	0	-		-		28	2
Liaoning FC	Total		44	2	1	0	0	0	0	0	45	2
Hebei China Fortune	2016	Chinese Super League	28	0	0	0	-		-		28	0
Hebei China Fortune	2017	Chinese Super League	15	0	2	0	-		-		17	0
Hebei China Fortune	Total		43	0	2	0	0	0	0	0	45	0
Guangzhou R&F	2018	Chinese Super League	18	0	3	0	-		-		21	0
Guangzhou R&F	2019	Chinese Super League	20	0	0	0	-		-		20	0
Guangzhou R&F	Total		38	0	3	0	0	0	0	0	41	0
Hebei China Fortune/ Hebei	2020	Chinese Super League	15	1	0	0	-		-		15	1
Hebei China Fortune/ Hebei	2021	Chinese Super League	17	0	0	0	-		-		17	0
Hebei China Fortune/ Hebei	2022	Chinese Super League	15	1	0	0	-		-		15	1
Hebei China Fortune/ Hebei	Total		47	2	0	0	0	0	0	0	47	2
Shijiazhuang Gongfu	2023	China League One	22	0	0	0	-		-		22	0
Tianjin Jinmen Tiger	2024	Chinese Super League	3	0	-		-		-		3	0
Henan (loan)	2024	Chinese Super League	7	0	2	0	-		-		9	0
Qingdao West Coast	2025	Chinese Super League	10	0	2	0	-		-		12	0
Qingdao West Coast	2026	Chinese Super League	7	0	1	0	-		-		8	0
Qingdao West Coast	Total		17	0	3	0	0	0	0	0	20	0
Career total			273	5	15	0	0	0	0	0	288	5
