= Su Boyang =

Chinese footballer

Su Boyang 苏渤洋
Personal information
- Full name: Su Boyang
- Date of birth: 20 January 1989 (age 37)
- Place of birth: Beijing, China
- Height: 1.85 m (6 ft 1 in)
- Position: Goalkeeper

Youth career
- Beijing Guoan

Senior career*
Years	Team	Apps	(Gls)
2010	Beijing Guoan Talent	28	(0)
2011	Guizhou Zhicheng	11	(0)
2012–2013	Hebei Zhongji	31	(0)
2014–2020	Guizhou Hengfeng	98	(0)
- * Club domestic league appearances and goals as of 31 December 2020

Su Boyang (simplified Chinese: 苏渤洋; traditional Chinese: 蘇渤洋; pinyin: Sū Bóyáng; born 20 January 1989) is a Chinese football goalkeeper who currently is a free agent.

== Club career ==
=== Beijing Guoan Talent ===
Su Boyang started his professional football career in 2010 when he was loaned to Beijing Guoan's satellite team Beijing Guoan Talent, which would play as a foreign team in Singapore's S. League in the 2010 season. Playing as the captain of the team, Su made his senior debut in a 1–0 home defeat against Étoile FC on 12 February 2010. On 7 September 2010, the club was involved in a brawl during a match with Young Lions at Jalan Besar Stadium. He was suspended from playing or participating football for 8 months and being fined S$2,000 by Football Association of Singapore (FAS) for participating the brawl.

=== Guizhou Zhicheng ===
Su joined China League One newcomer Guizhou Zhicheng in 2011 after he was released by Beijing Guoan. He transferred to China League Two side Hebei Zhongji in January 2012. He made his debut for Hebei on 28 April 2012 in a 1–0 away win against Shandong Youth.

=== Hebei Zhongji ===
Su lost his position to Sui Weijie in the second half of 2013 season when he asked for leave to get married and joined Hebei Zhongji

=== Return to Guizhou Zhicheng ===
In January 2014, Su returned to Guizhou Zhicheng who played in the 2014 China League Two. He played as the first choice of the club as Guizhou returned to the 2015 China League One. Su conceded 21 goals and saved three penalties in 26 league appearances in the 2016 season as Guizhou won the runners-up of the league and won promotion to the 2016 Chinese Super League. Su was named as a candidate for 2016 Goalkeeper of League One award but lost out to Tianjin Quanjian goalkeeper, Zhang Lu. Su extended his contract with Guizhou on 14 January 2017. He made his Super League debut on 3 March 2017 in a 1–1 home draw against Liaoning FC. After six seasons with the club he left on 1 January 2020.

== Career statistics ==
As of 31 December 2020.

Appearances and goals by club, season and competition
Club	Season	League			National Cup		League Cup		Continental		Total	
Club	Season	Division	Apps	Goals	Apps	Goals	Apps	Goals	Apps	Goals	Apps	Goals
Beijing Guoan Talent	2010	S. League	28	0	1	0	1	0	-		30	0
Guizhou Zhicheng	2011	China League One	11	0	1	0	-		-		12	0
Hebei Zhongji	2012	China League Two	24	0	0	0	-		-		24	0
Hebei Zhongji	2013	China League Two	7	0	2	0	-		-		9	0
Hebei Zhongji	Total		31	0	2	0	0	0	0	0	33	0
Guizhou Hengfeng	2014	China League Two	19	0	2	0	-		-		21	0
Guizhou Hengfeng	2015	China League One	15	0	1	0	-		-		16	0
Guizhou Hengfeng	2016	China League One	26	0	0	0	-		-		26	0
Guizhou Hengfeng	2017	Chinese Super League	26	0	0	0	-		-		26	0
Guizhou Hengfeng	2018	Chinese Super League	12	0	3	0	-		-		15	0
Guizhou Hengfeng	2019	China League One	0	0	1	0	-		-		1	0
Guizhou Hengfeng	Total		98	0	7	0	0	0	0	0	105	0
Career total			168	0	11	0	1	0	0	0	180	0
