= Yu Tianzhu =

Chinese association football player

Personal information
- Date of birth: 5 December 1989 (age 36)
- Place of birth: Beijing, China
- Height: 1.78 m (5 ft 10 in)
- Position: Defender

Senior career*
Years	Team	Apps	(Gls)
2010	Beijing Guoan Talent (Singapore)	30	(2)
2011	Guizhou Zhicheng	18	(1)
2012–2013	Hebei Zhongji	39	(4)
2014–2015	Guizhou Zhicheng	19	(3)
2016	Shenzhen Baoxin	0	(0)
2017–2020	Hunan Billows	24	(0)
- * Club domestic league appearances and goals as of 31 December 2020

Yu Tianzhu (Chinese: 于天竹; pinyin: Yú Tiānzhú; born 5 December 1989) is a Chinese former footballer. He last played as a defender for Hunan Billows F.C.

== Club career ==
Yu Tianzhu would play for the Beijing Guoan youth team before he was loaned to Beijing Guoan's satellite team Beijing Guoan Talent, which would play as a foreign team in Singapore's S.League in 2010. On his return to China he would join second tier club Guizhou Zhicheng, however in his debut season he would be part of the squad that was relegated at the end of the 2011 China League One campaign. He would join third tier club Hebei Zhongji the following season.

Yu would return to Guizhou and was part of the team that gained promotion to the second tier at the end of the 2014 China League Two campaign. While he was at Guizhou he would be a peripheral member of the team and would join lower league side Shenzhen Baoxin on a free transfer before joining third tier club Hunan Billows.

== Career statistics ==
Statistics accurate as of match played 31 December 2020.

Appearances and goals by club, season and competition
Club	Season	League			National Cup		League Cup		Continental		Total	
Club	Season	Division	Apps	Goals	Apps	Goals	Apps	Goals	Apps	Goals	Apps	Goals
Beijing Guoan Talent (Singapore)	2010	S. League	30	2	1	0	0	0	–		31	2
Guizhou Zhicheng	2011	China League One	18	1	0	0	–		–		18	1
Hebei Zhongji	2012	China League Two	24	4	0	0	–		–		24	4
Hebei Zhongji	2013	China League Two	15	0	2	0	–		–		17	0
Hebei Zhongji	Total		39	4	2	0	0	0	0	0	41	4
Guizhou Zhicheng	2014	China League Two	10	2	1	0	–		–		11	2
Guizhou Zhicheng	2015	China League One	9	1	2	0	–		–		11	1
Guizhou Zhicheng	Total		19	3	3	0	0	0	0	0	22	3
Shenzhen Baoxin	2016	Amateur League	–		–		–		–		–	–
Hunan Billows	2017	China League Two	19	0	0	0	–		–		19	0
Hunan Billows	2018	China League Two	5	0	0	0	–		–		5	0
Hunan Billows	2019	China League Two	0	0	0	0	–		–		0	0
Hunan Billows	Total		24	0	0	0	0	0	0	0	24	0
Career total			130	10	6	0	0	0	0	0	136	10
