= Tan Tiancheng =

Chinese footballer

Tan Tiancheng 谭天澄
Personal information
- Date of birth: 15 May 1991 (age 35)
- Place of birth: Taiyuan, Shanxi, China
- Height: 1.77 m (5 ft 9 1/2 in)
- Position: Striker

Team information
- Current team: Shanxi Chongde Ronghai
- Number: 31

Youth career
- 2002–2009: Beijing Guoan

Senior career*
Years	Team	Apps	(Gls)
2009–2015	Beijing Guoan	11	(0)
2010	→ Beijing Guoan Talent (loan)	15	(6)
2013	→ Lijiang Jiayunhao (loan)	8	(3)
2016–2017	Yinchuan Helanshan	45	(20)
2018–2021	Changchun Yatai	29	(1)
2021	→ Xi'an Wolves (loan)	19	(10)
2022	Zibo Qisheng	6	(0)
2022-2023	Jinan Xingzhou	26	(1)
2025-	Shanxi Chongde Ronghai	18	(3)

International career
2009–2010	China U19	5	(3)
- * Club domestic league appearances and goals as of 6 May 2022

Tan Tiancheng (Chinese: 谭天澄; pinyin: Tán Tiānchéng; born 15 May 1991 in Taiyuan) is a Chinese footballer who plays as a striker for Shanxi Chongde Ronghai.

== Club career ==
Tan started his senior career in 2009 with Beijing Guoan. He made his debut in a league match against Qingdao Jonoon on 27 September.

Tan was loaned to Beijing's satellite team Beijing Guoan Talent which would play as a foreign team in Singapore's S.League in 2010. He scored his first senior league goal on his first appearance, in a 3-1 away win against Geylang United on 12 March. He returned to Beijing Guoan in July. In July 2013, he was loan to China League Two side Lijiang Jiayunhao until 31 December 2013.

Tan transferred to China League Two side Yinchuan Helanshan in March 2016. He made a promising performances for the club in the 2016 and 2017 season, scoring 22 goals in 49 appearances.

On 10 February 2018, Tan transferred to Chinese Super League side Changchun Yatai.

== International career ==
Tan was called up into China U-20's squad in 2009. He scored 3 goals in 5 matches in 2010 AFC U-19 Championship qualification.

== Career statistics ==
Statistics accurate as of match played 31 December 2020.

Appearances and goals by club, season and competition
Club	Season	League			National Cup		League Cup		Continental		Total	
Club	Season	Division	Apps	Goals	Apps	Goals	Apps	Goals	Apps	Goals	Apps	Goals
Beijing Guoan	2009	Chinese Super League	1	0	-		-		0	0	1	0
Beijing Guoan	2010	Chinese Super League	2	0	-		-		0	0	2	0
Beijing Guoan	2011	Chinese Super League	3	0	0	0	-		-		3	0
Beijing Guoan	2012	Chinese Super League	0	0	0	0	-		0	0	0	0
Beijing Guoan	2013	Chinese Super League	2	0	0	0	-		2	0	4	0
Beijing Guoan	2014	Chinese Super League	2	0	0	0	-		1	0	3	0
Beijing Guoan	2015	Chinese Super League	1	0	1	0	-		0	0	2	0
Beijing Guoan	Total		11	0	1	0	0	0	3	0	15	0
Beijing Guoan Talent (loan)	2010	S. League	15	6	1	0	0	0	-		16	6
Lijiang Jiayunhao (loan)	2013	China League Two	8	3	0	0	-		-		8	3
Yinchuan Helanshan	2016	China League Two	20	11	2	1	-		-		22	12
Yinchuan Helanshan	2017	China League Two	25	9	2	1	-		-		27	10
Yinchuan Helanshan	Total		45	20	4	1	0	0	0	0	49	22
Changchun Yatai	2018	Chinese Super League	11	0	1	1	-		-		12	1
Changchun Yatai	2019	China League One	12	1	2	0	-		-		14	1
Changchun Yatai	2020	China League One	6	0	0	0	-		-		6	0
Changchun Yatai	Total		29	1	3	1	0	0	0	0	26	2
Career total			108	30	9	3	0	0	3	0	120	33

== Honours ==
=== Club ===
Changchun Yatai

- China League One: 2020
