= Meng Yang =

Chinese association football player

Personal information
- Date of birth: 16 July 1989 (age 37)
- Height: 1.80 m (5 ft 11 in)
- Position: Midfielder

Team information
- Current team: Ningbo Xiangshan

Youth career
- 2011–2013: Beijing Guoan

Senior career*
Years	Team	Apps	(Gls)
2010	Beijing Guoan Talent (Singapore)	23	(0)
2011–2014	Beijing Guoan	0	(0)
2013	→ Meizhou Kejia (loan)		(1)
2014	→ Beijing BIT (loan)	23	(4)
2015–2016	Beijing BIT	38	(3)
2017	Yunnan Lijiang	28	(8)
2018	Dalian Transcendence	4	(0)
2019	Baoding Yingli ETS	11	(2)
2020–2022	Shanghai Jiading Huilong	20	(2)
2022-	Ningbo Xiangshan	0	(0)
- * Club domestic league appearances and goals as of 11 April 2022

Meng Yang (Chinese: 孟洋; pinyin: Mèng Yáng; born 16 July 1989) is a Chinese footballer who plays for China League Two side Ningbo Xiangshan.

== Club career ==
Meng Yang would play for the Beijing Guoan youth team before he was loaned to Beijing Guoan's satellite team Beijing Guoan Talent, which would play as a foreign team in Singapore's S.League in 2010. He would subsequently return to Beijing Guoan and be promoted to the senior team in the 2011 Chinese Super League campaign. He would then later be loaned to Meizhou Kejia and Beijing BIT.

On 23 February 2017 he joined second-tier football club Yunnan Lijiang.

== Career statistics ==
As of 31 December 2020.

Appearances and goals by club, season and competition
Club	Season	League			National Cup		League Cup		Other		Total	
Club	Season	Division	Apps	Goals	Apps	Goals	Apps	Goals	Apps	Goals	Apps	Goals
Beijing Guoan Talent (Singapore)	2010	S. League	23	0	1 (Note: Appearances in the Singapore Cup)	0	1 (Note: Appearances in the Singapore League Cup)	0	0	0	25	0
Beijing Guoan	2011	Chinese Super League	0	0	0	0	–		0	0	0	0
Beijing Guoan	2012	Chinese Super League	0	0	0	0	–		0	0	0	0
Beijing Guoan	Total		0	0	0	0	0	0	0	0	0	0
Meizhou Kejia (loan)	2013	China League Two		1	0	0	–		0	0		1
Beijing BIT (loan)	2014	China League One	23	4	1 (Note: Appearances in the Chinese FA Cup)	1	–		0	0	24	5
Beijing BIT	2015	China League One	22	1	1	0	–		0	0	23	1
Beijing BIT	2016	China League Two	16	2	1	0	–		2 (Note: Appearances in the China League Two playoffs)	1	19	3
Beijing BIT	Total		38	3	2	0	0	0	0	0	42	4
Yunnan Lijiang	2017	China League One	28	8	0	0	–		0	0	28	8
Dalian Transcendence	2018	China League One	4	0	0	0	–		0	0	4	0
Baoding Yingli ETS	2019	China League Two	11	2	0	0	-		-		11	2
Shanghai Jiading Boji	2020	China League Two	10	1	-		-		-		10	1
Career total			126	17	4	1	1	0	2	1	133	19
