= Xu Huaiji =

Chinese association football player

Personal information
- Date of birth: 7 May 1989 (age 37)
- Place of birth: Beijing, China
- Height: 1.78 m (5 ft 10 in)
- Position: Defender

Youth career
- Beijing Guoan

Senior career*
Years	Team	Apps	(Gls)
2010	Beijing Guoan Talent (Singapore)	21	(0)
Total		21	(0)
- * Club domestic league appearances and goals

Xu Huaiji (simplified Chinese: 徐怀冀; traditional Chinese: 徐懷冀; pinyin: Xú Huáijì; born 7 May 1989) is a Chinese former footballer.

== Career statistics ==
=== Club ===
Club	Season	League			National Cup		League Cup		Other		Total	
Club	Season	Division	Apps	Goals	Apps	Goals	Apps	Goals	Apps	Goals	Apps	Goals
Beijing Guoan Talent (Singapore)	2010	S. League	21	0	1 (Note: Appearances in the Singapore Cup)	0	1 (Note: Appearances in the Singapore League Cup)	0	0	0	23	0
Career total			21	0	1	0	1	0	0	0	23	0
