= Liu Teng =

Chinese association football player

Personal information
- Date of birth: 6 January 1989 (age 37)
- Height: 1.82 m (6 ft 0 in)
- Position: Midfielder

Senior career*
Years	Team	Apps	(Gls)
2010	Beijing Guoan Talent (Singapore)	29	(2)
2011–2012	Beijing Yitong Kuche		
2013	Qingdao Kunpeng		
2013	Meizhou Kejia		
2014–2016	Guizhou Hengfeng	1	(0)
2017–2018	Lhasa Urban Construction Investment		
Total		30	(2)
- * Club domestic league appearances and goals

Liu Teng (Chinese: 刘滕; pinyin: Liú Téng; born 6 January 1989) is a Chinese footballer.

== Career statistics ==
=== Club ===
As of 6 June 2019.

Club	Season	League			National Cup		League Cup		Other		Total	
Club	Season	Division	Apps	Goals	Apps	Goals	Apps	Goals	Apps	Goals	Apps	Goals
Beijing Guoan Talent (Singapore)	2010	S. League	29	2	1 (Note: Appearances in the Singapore Cup)	0	1 (Note: Appearances in the Singapore League Cup)	0	0	0	31	2
Guizhou Hengfeng	2015	China League One	1	0	0	0	–		0	0	1	0
Guizhou Hengfeng	2016	China League One	0	0	1 (Note: Appearances in the Chinese FA Cup)	0	–		0	0	1	0
Guizhou Hengfeng	Total		1	0	1	0	0	0	0	0	2	0
Lhasa Urban Construction Investment (loan)	2017	China Amateur Football League	–		0	0	–		2 (Note: Appearances in the China League Two playoffs)	0	2	0
Career total			105	14	4	1	1	0	2	1	112	16
