= Wu Hao (footballer) =

Chinese footballer

Wu Hao 吴昊
Personal information
- Date of birth: 19 February 1983 (age 43)
- Place of birth: Fengtai, Beijing, China
- Height: 1.92 m (6 ft 4 in)
- Position: Defender

Youth career
- 1999–2000: Jiangsu Sainty

Senior career*
Years	Team	Apps	(Gls)
2001–2006	Jiangsu Sainty	0	(0)
2005	→ Sinchi (loan)	21	(1)
2006	→ Henan Jianye (loan)	22	(2)
2007	Henan Construction	21	(0)
2008–2009	Shandong Luneng	17	(0)
2010	Beijing Guoan	3	(0)
2012	Beijing Yitong Kuche	13	(1)

International career^{‡}
2008–2009	China	8	(1)
- * Club domestic league appearances and goals as of 7 April 2010 ‡ National team caps and goals as of 26 January 2010

Wu Hao (simplified Chinese: 吴昊; traditional Chinese: 吳昊; pinyin: Wú Hào) (born February 19, 1983) is a Chinese former professional football player who represented Jiangsu Sainty, Sinchi FC, Henan Jianye, Shandong Luneng, Beijing Guoan and Beijing Yitong Kuche.

== Club career ==
Wu Hao started his professional football career with second tier football club Jiangsu Sainty in the 2001 league season, however found it difficult to establish himself within their team. In 2005 Wu Hao would be loaned out to Sinchi FC in Singapore where he played in the S. League and would quickly established himself as a regular within their team. The following season saw Sinchi FC withdrawn from the league and Wu Hao was loaned out once more to this time Henan Jianye who were a second tier Chinese football team. His loan period was a huge success and he would win the league title and promotion to the Chinese Super League at the end of the 2006 season. This saw Wu Hao complete a permanent transfer towards Henan Jianye and he would go on to help establish the team within league. After his successful period with Henan Jianye he would transfer to Shandong Luneng for a reported 3,000,000 RMB and though he found it difficult to establish himself within the team he would go on to win the 2008 Chinese Super League title with the team. The 2009 league season was however very disappointing for him as he often found himself on the substitute bench and once reigning champions Beijing Guoan showed an interests within him he was sold with team mate Wang Xiaolong for a combined fee of 2,000,000 RMB.

== International career ==
Wu Hao would make his debut on April 16, 2008 for the senior national team against Mexico in a friendly 1-0 loss coming on as a substitute despite not even establishing himself for the Shandong Luneng team. Under the Chinese Head coach Vladimir Petrović his performances for the national team continued when he was selected for the following friendlies against El Salvador and Jordan. He would go to make his competitive debut in the 2010 FIFA World Cup qualification game against Qatar on June 2, 2008 in a 0-0 draw and has continued to be selected for the national team under Petrović's reign, predominately coming on as a substitute.

== Honours ==
Henan Jianye

- China League One: 2006

Shandong Luneng

- Chinese Super League: 2008
