= William Modibo =

Cameroonian footballer

Personal information
- Full name: William Paul Modibo
- Date of birth: 18 May 1979 (age 47)
- Place of birth: Ngaoundéré, Cameroon
- Height: 1.86 m (6 ft 1 in)
- Position: Centre back

Youth career
- 1997–1998: Brasseries Football School

Senior career*
Years	Team	Apps	(Gls)
1999–2000	Girondins Ngaoundéré		
2000–2005	Trofense	114	(7)
2005–2007	Aves	56	(2)
2007–2008	Al-Salmiya		
2008–2009	Gil Vicente	6	(1)
2009	Beijing Guoan	20	(0)
2010–2011	Arouca	26	(0)
2011–2012	Doxa	27	(3)
2012	Tondela	2	(0)
2013	Negeri Sembilan	20	(0)
2014	Osotspa	11	(0)
2015–2017	Lanexang United		
2017–2018	Joane		
- * Club domestic league appearances and goals as of 13 November 2016

William Paul Modibo (born 18 May 1979) is a Cameroonian professional footballer who played as a central defender.

== Club career ==
Born in Ngaoundéré, Modibo played the vast majority of his professional career in Portugal, his first stop being with C.D. Trofense in the third and fourth divisions. In 2006 he helped C.D. Aves promote to the Primeira Liga, only to be immediately relegated back.

After one season in Kuwait, Modibo returned to Portugal with Gil Vicente F.C. However, in the following transfer window, he moved clubs and countries again, signing with Beijing Guoan F.C. He started in most games during the campaign, helping the Chinese capital team win the national championship.

For 2010–11, aged 31, Modibo moved once again to Portugal, signing with modest F.C. Arouca in the second level.

== Honours ==
Beijing Guoan

- Chinese Super League: 2009

Lanexang United

- Lao Premier League: 2016
