= Yang Yun (footballer, born 1989) =

Chinese footballer born 1989

Yang Yun 杨运
Personal information
- Full name: Yang Yun
- Date of birth: July 18, 1989 (age 37)
- Place of birth: Beijing, China
- Height: 1.83 m (6 ft 0 in)
- Positions: Defender; defensive midfielder

Team information
- Current team: Dalian Jinshiwan

Youth career
- Beijing Guoan

Senior career*
Years	Team	Apps	(Gls)
2009–2016	Beijing Guoan	27	(0)
2010	→ Beijing Guoan Talent (loan)	14	(0)
2015	→ Liaoning Whowin (loan)	12	(0)
2017–2020	Beijing Enterprises Group	53	(1)
2020	→ Hebei Aoli Jingying (loan)	7	(1)
2021	Kunshan F.C.	18	(4)
2022-	Dalian Jinshiwan	0	(0)
- * Club domestic league appearances and goals as of 15 May 2022

Yang Yun (Chinese: 杨运; pinyin: Yáng Yùn) (born 18 July 1989) is a Chinese footballer who plays for Chinese club Dalian Jinshiwan.

== Club career ==
Yang started his football career in 2009 when he was promoted to Beijing Guoan's first team squad. The following season in an attempt to gain more playing time Yang was loaned to Beijing Guoan's satellite team Beijing Guoan Talent, which would play as a foreign team in Singapore's S.League in 2010. He made his senior debut in a 3–1 away victory against Geylang United on 12 March 2010. He returned to Beijing Guoan in July 2010 and went on to play in the 2010 Chinese Super League. On 18 August, he made his debut for Beijing Guoan, in a 0–0 away draw against Shaanxi Baorong Chanba, coming on as a substitute for Yan Xiangchuang in the 59th minute. On 27 February 2015, he was loaned to Super League club Liaoning Whowin until 31 December 2015.

== Career statistics ==
Statistics accurate as of match played 31 December 2020.

Appearances and goals by club, season and competition
Club	Season	League			National Cup		League Cup		Continental		Total	
Club	Season	Division	Apps	Goals	Apps	Goals	Apps	Goals	Apps	Goals	Apps	Goals
Beijing Guoan	2009	Chinese Super League	0	0	-		-		0	0	0	0
Beijing Guoan	2010	Chinese Super League	3	0	-		-		0	0	3	0
Beijing Guoan	2011	Chinese Super League	2	0	0	0	-		-		2	0
Beijing Guoan	2012	Chinese Super League	4	0	0	0	-		1	0	5	0
Beijing Guoan	2013	Chinese Super League	14	0	3	1	-		5	0	22	1
Beijing Guoan	2014	Chinese Super League	0	0	2	0	-		1	0	3	0
Beijing Guoan	2016	Chinese Super League	4	0	0	0	-		-		4	0
Beijing Guoan	Total		27	0	5	1	0	0	7	0	39	1
Beijing Guoan Talent (loan)	2010	S. League	14	0	1	0	0	0	-		15	0
Liaoning Whowin (loan)	2015	Chinese Super League	12	0	1	0	-		-		13	0
Beijing Enterprises Group	2018	China League One	26	1	0	0	-		-		26	1
Beijing Enterprises Group	2019	China League One	27	0	0	0	-		-		27	0
Beijing Enterprises Group	Total		53	1	0	0	0	0	0	0	53	1
Hebei Aoli Jingying (loan)	2020	China League Two	7	1	-		-		-		7	1
Career total			113	2	7	1	0	0	7	0	127	3
