= Zou Yucheng =

Chinese association football player

Personal information
- Date of birth: 15 September 1991 (age 35)
- Place of birth: Kunming, China
- Height: 1.80 m (5 ft 11 in)
- Position: Midfielder

Senior career*
Years	Team	Apps	(Gls)
2010	Beijing Guoan Talent (Singapore)	2	(0)
2011–2013	Chongqing	28	(0)
2014–2015	Yinchuan Helanshan	21	(0)
2016–2018	Inner Mongolia Zhongyou	66	(1)
2019–2022	Zhejiang Greentown	11	(0)
- * Club domestic league appearances and goals as of 1 December 2022

Zou Yucheng (simplified Chinese: 邹宇成; traditional Chinese: 鄒宇成; pinyin: Zōu Yǔchéng; born 15 September 1991) is a Chinese footballer who plays as a midfielder.

== Club career ==
Zou Yucheng would play for Beijing Guoan's youth academy before he was sent to the club's satellite team Beijing Guoan Talent Singapore FC who were allowed to play as a foreign team in Singapore's S. League in the 2010 season. He would make his debut in a Singapore League Cup game on 23 February 2010 against Sengkang Punggol in a 3-1 defeat in extra time. At the end of the season he was allowed to leave the club and he joined third tier football club Chongqing where in his debut season he was able to gain promotion with the club in his first campaign. After three seasons with the club they were relegated at the end of the 2013 China League One campaign and disbanded. Zou would join third tier football club Yinchuan Helanshan on a free transfer for the 2014 China League Two campaign. He would move to Inner Mongolia Zhongyou where he would establish himself as an integral member of their team before joining Zhejiang Greentown on 31 January 2019. He would make his debut in a league game on 17 March 2019 against Heilongjiang Lava Spring in a 2-1 victory. Often used as a squad player, he would still be part of the team gained promotion to the top tier at the end of the 2021 campaign.

== Career statistics ==
As of 1 December 2022

Appearances and goals by club, season and competition
Club	Season	League			National Cup		League Cup		Continental		Total	
Club	Season	Division	Apps	Goals	Apps	Goals	Apps	Goals	Apps	Goals	Apps	Goals
Beijing Guoan Talent (Singapore)	2010	S. League	2	0	0	0	1	0	–		3	0
Chongqing	2011	China League Two	15	0	–		–		–		15	0
Chongqing	2012	China League One	11	0	0	0	–		–		11	0
Chongqing	2013	China League One	2	0	0	0	–		–		2	0
Chongqing	Total		28	0	0	0	0	0	0	0	28	0
Yinchuan Helanshan	2014	China League Two	9	0	0	0	–		–		9	0
Yinchuan Helanshan	2015	China League Two	12	0	2	0	–		–		14	0
Yinchuan Helanshan	Total		21	0	2	0	0	0	0	0	23	0
Inner Mongolia Zhongyou	2016	China League One	18	0	2	0	–		–		20	0
Inner Mongolia Zhongyou	2017	China League One	23	0	2	0	–		–		25	0
Inner Mongolia Zhongyou	2018	China League One	25	1	1	0	–		–		26	1
Inner Mongolia Zhongyou	Total		66	1	5	0	0	0	0	0	71	1
Zhejiang Greentown	2019	China League One	4	0	2	0	–		–		6	0
Zhejiang Greentown	2020	China League One	0	0	0	0	–		0 (Note: Appearance(s) in CSL Relegation play-offs)	0	0	0
Zhejiang Greentown	2021	China League One	7	0	1	0	–		0	0	8	0
Zhejiang Greentown	Total		11	0	3	0	0	0	0	0	14	0
Career total			128	1	10	0	1	0	0	0	139	1
