= Huang Jun (footballer) =

Chinese association football player

Personal information
- Date of birth: 8 March 1990 (age 36)
- Place of birth: Changsha, China
- Height: 1.76 m (5 ft 9 in)
- Position: Midfielder

Senior career*
Years	Team	Apps	(Gls)
2010	Beijing Guoan	0	(0)
2010	→ Beijing Guoan Talent (Singapore) (loan)	7	(0)
Total		7	(0)
- * Club domestic league appearances and goals

Huang Jun (simplified Chinese: 黄骏; traditional Chinese: 黃駿; pinyin: Huáng Jùn; born 8 March 1990) is a Chinese former footballer.

== Career statistics ==
=== Club ===
Club	Season	League			National Cup		League Cup		Other		Total	
Club	Season	Division	Apps	Goals	Apps	Goals	Apps	Goals	Apps	Goals	Apps	Goals
Beijing Guoan	2010	Chinese Super League	0	0	0	0	–		0	0	0	0
Beijing Guoan Talent (Singapore)	2010	S. League	7	0	0	0	0	0	0	0	7	0
Career total			7	0	0	0	0	0	0	0	7	0
