= Zhang Xizhe =

Chinese footballer

Zhang Xizhe 张稀哲
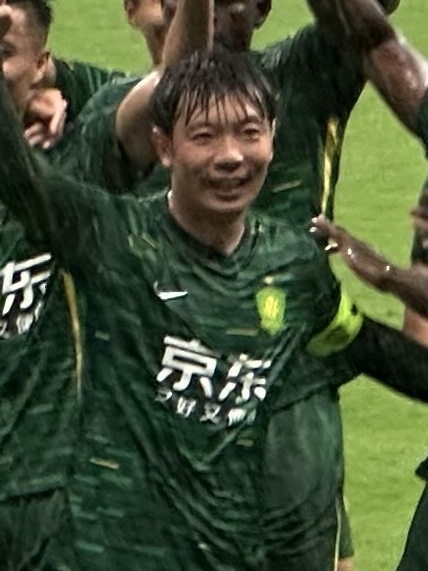
- Zhang Xizhe in June 2025

Personal information
- Full name: Zhang Xizhe
- Date of birth: 23 January 1991 (age 35)
- Place of birth: Wuhan, Hubei, China
- Height: 1.80 m (5 ft 11 in)
- Position: Attacking midfielder

Team information
- Current team: Beijing Guoan
- Number: 10

Youth career
- 1998–2004: Qinhuangdao Football School
- 2005–2006: Beijing Black Horse
- 2006–2009: Beijing Guoan

Senior career*
Years	Team	Apps	(Gls)
2009–2014	Beijing Guoan	122	(24)
2010	→ Beijing Guoan Talent (loan)	5	(2)
2015	VfL Wolfsburg	0	(0)
2015–	Beijing Guoan	251	(41)

International career^{‡}
2009–2010	China U-20	9	(2)
2012–2013	China U-23	7	(2)
2011–2022	China	37	(7)
Medal record
Representing China
Men's football
EAFF Championship
Silver medal – second place	2013 South Korea	Team
Bronze medal – third place	2019 South Korea	Team
- * Club domestic league appearances and goals as of 8 November 2026 ‡ National team caps and goals as of 29 March 2022

Zhang Xizhe (Chinese: 张稀哲; pinyin: Zhāng Xīzhé; Mandarin pronunciation: [ʈʂáŋ.ɕí ʈʂɤ̌]; born 23 January 1991) is a Chinese professional footballer who plays as an attacking midfielder for Chinese Super League club Beijing Guoan.

== Club career ==
=== Beijing Guoan ===
Zhang Xizhe started his football career with Beijing Guoan when he made his debut for the club on 30 August 2009 in a 1–1 draw against Shandong Luneng. He was then loaned to S.League side Beijing Guoan Talent during the 2010 season. He made his debut and scored his first goal for the club on 12 March 2010 in a 3–1 win against Geylang United. He returned to Beijing in July 2010 and scored his first goal for the club on 22 August 2010 in a 2–2 draw against Henan Jianye. As he grew in experience, he was awarded the Chinese Football Association Young Player of the Year award in the 2012 season. The 2013 season was Zhang's breakout season for Beijing, scoring eleven goals and assisting twelve goals in thirty league games.

=== VfL Wolfsburg ===
On 16 December 2014, Zhang transferred to Bundesliga side VfL Wolfsburg after yet another successful season for Beijing. Zhang made his unofficial debut for Wolfsburg during a winter training camp on 14 January 2015 as he came off the bench to assist Bas Dost's second goal in a 4–1 win against Ajax Cape Town. Even though he made the matchday squad for several matches, Zhang failed to make a single appearance for Wolfsburg during his time with the club.

=== Return to Beijing Guoan ===
On 15 July 2015, Zhang returned to Chinese Super League side Beijing Guoan after just six months with VfL Wolfsburg. He made his return debut for the club on 20 July 2015 in a 0–0 draw against Shanghai SIPG. He scored his first goal for the club since his return on 20 September 2015 in a 1–0 win against Jiangsu Sainty. On 25 October 2017, Zhang was sent off during a league match against Chongqing Dangdai Lifan for slapping Chen Lei in the face. On 3 November 2017, he was handed a twelve-match suspension in the league by the Chinese Football Association. After serving his suspension the following season he would win the 2018 Chinese FA Cup with Guoan, the club's first major trophy in 9 years, where he scored the decisive goal in the second leg of the final against Shandong Luneng to give Guoan a 2–1 lead in an eventual 2-2 draw, aggregated score across 2 legs was 3-3 and Guoan won on away goals.

On 24 November 2020, Zhang made his 300th appearance for Guoan in a 3–1 win against Melbourne Victory in the 2020 AFC Champions League group stage.

Zhang made his 400th appearance for Guoan on 21 May 2025 in a 4–0 victory against Shijiazhuang Gongfu in the 2025 Chinese FA Cup. In the 57th minute of the match, Zhang Xizhe scored from a direct free kick. He became only the third player to appear in 400 games across all competitions for Guoan, after Xu Yunlong and Yang Zhi. Guoan fans celebrated his 400th appearance in the next home league game on 14 June 2025, holding up a massive tifo in Workers' Stadium ahead of kickoff. He captained the side in the match and scored in the 11th minute in a 2–1 win against Changchun Yatai.

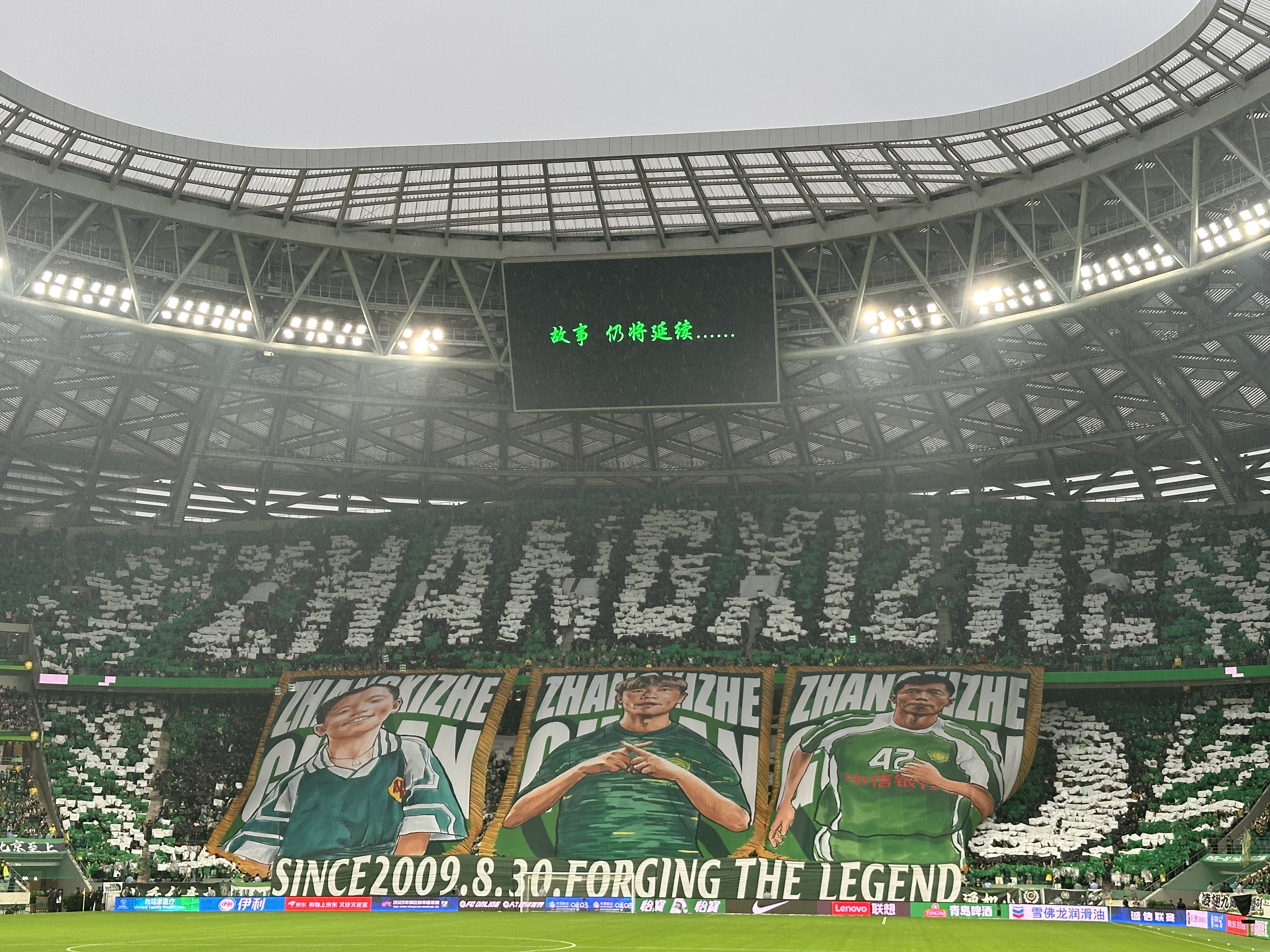
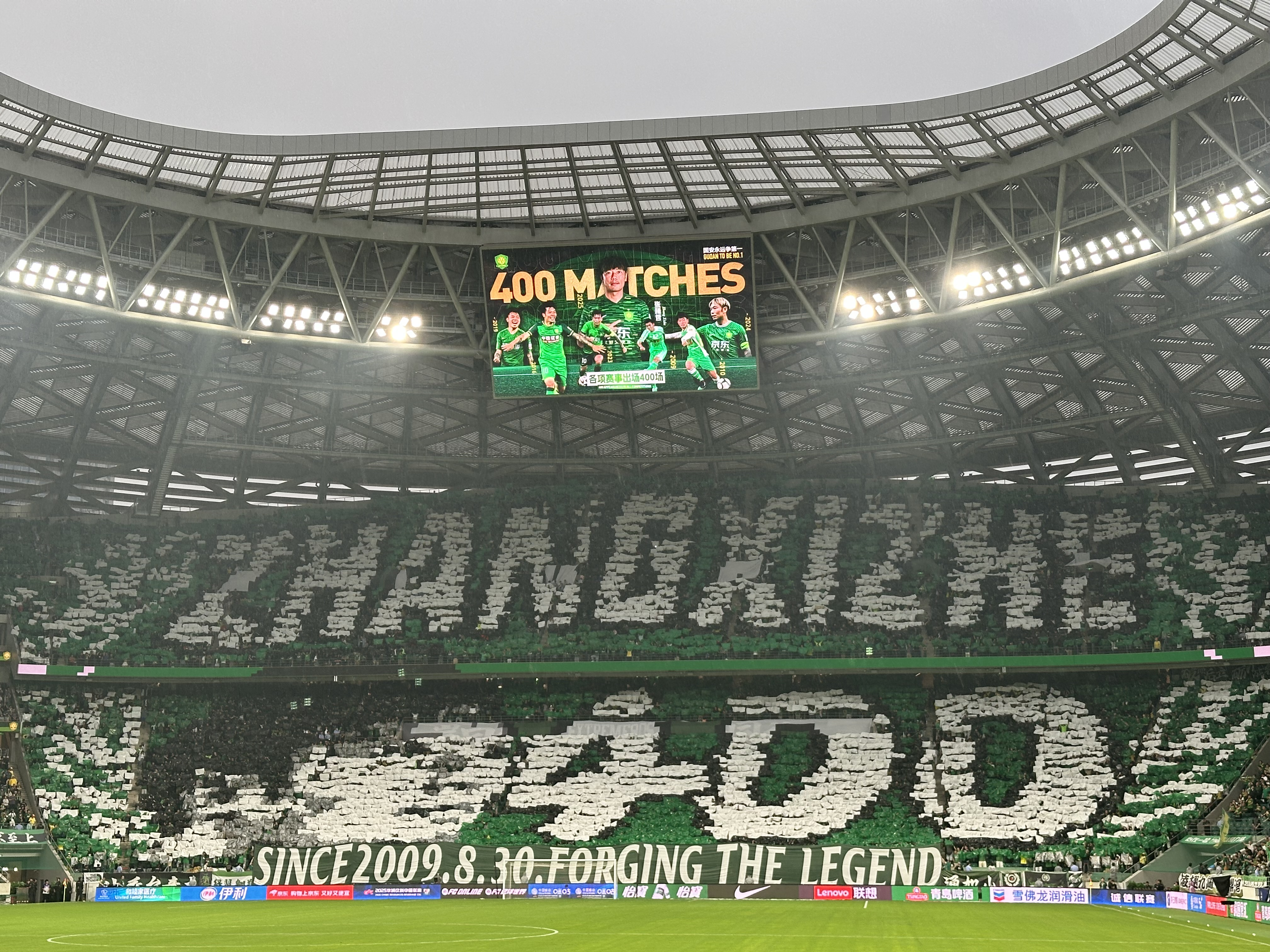
Tifo celebrating Zhang's 400th appearance for Beijing Guoan in June 2025

== International career ==
Zhang was called up to the Chinese under-20 national team in 2009 and took part in the 2010 AFC U-19 Championship qualifying campaign where he scored two goals from five appearances. At the 2010 AFC U-19 Championship, he played in every game as China lost in the quarter-finals at the tournament. He made his debut for the Chinese national team on 26 March 2011 in a 2–2 draw against Costa Rica. He scored his first goal for China on 6 September 2013 in a 6–1 win against Singapore. On 5 March 2014, Zhang scored a penalty in the final match of 2015 AFC Asian Cup qualification in a 3–1 loss against Iraq which ensured that China advanced to the 2015 AFC Asian Cup as the best third place team, beating Lebanon on goal difference.

== Career statistics ==
=== Club statistics ===
As of 20 November 2026

Appearances and goals by club, season and competition
Club	Season	League			National Cup		League Cup		Continental		Other		Total	
Club	Season	Division	Apps	Goals	Apps	Goals	Apps	Goals	Apps	Goals	Apps	Goals	Apps	Goals
Beijing Guoan	2009	Chinese Super League	1	0	-		-		0	0	-		1	0
Beijing Guoan	2010	Chinese Super League	8	2	-		-		-		-		8	2
Beijing Guoan	2011	Chinese Super League	28	1	4	1	-		-		-		32	2
Beijing Guoan	2012	Chinese Super League	26	4	2	0	-		5	1	-		33	5
Beijing Guoan	2013	Chinese Super League	30	11	3	1	-		8	0	-		41	12
Beijing Guoan	2014	Chinese Super League	29	6	3	1	-		7	0	-		39	7
Beijing Guoan	Total		122	24	12	3	0	0	20	1	0	0	154	28
Beijing Guoan Talent (loan)	2010	S.League	5	2	0	0	0	0	-		-		5	2
VfL Wolfsburg	2014-15	Bundesliga	0	0	0	0	-		0	0	-		0	0
Beijing Guoan	2015	Chinese Super League	11	1	0	0	-		-		-		11	1
Beijing Guoan	2016	Chinese Super League	25	6	4	0	-		-		-		29	6
Beijing Guoan	2017	Chinese Super League	25	3	2	1	-		-		-		27	4
Beijing Guoan	2018	Chinese Super League	18	4	8	2	-		-		-		26	6
Beijing Guoan	2019	Chinese Super League	24	2	0	0	-		5	1	1 (Note: Appearance in Chinese FA Super Cup)	0	30	3
Beijing Guoan	2020	Chinese Super League	19	1	1	0	-		8	0	-		28	1
Beijing Guoan	2021	Chinese Super League	18	4	0	0	-		0	0	-		18	4
Beijing Guoan	2022	Chinese Super League	30	5	0	0	-		-		-		30	5
Beijing Guoan	2023	Chinese Super League	18	3	3	0	-		-		-		21	3
Beijing Guoan	2024	Chinese Super League	19	1	2	1	-		-		-		21	2
Beijing Guoan	2025	Chinese Super League	17	4	4	2	-		4	0	-		25	6
Beijing Guoan	2026	Chinese Super League	27	7	3	0	-		4	1	1	0	35	8
Beijing Guoan	Total		251	41	26	6	0	0	21	2	2	0	301	49
Career total			377	47	38	9	0	0	41	3	2	0	460	79

=== International statistics ===
National team
Year	Apps	Goals
2011	1	0
2012	0	0
2013	8	1
2014	1	1
2015	1	1
2016	4	0
2017	6	1
2018	2	0
2019	7	2
2020	0	0
2021	6	1
2022	1	0
Total	37	7

=== International goals ===
As of 15 June 2021
Scores and results list China's goal tally first.

No.	Date	Venue	Opponent	Score	Result	Competition
1.	6 September 2013	Olympic Stadium, Tianjin, China	Singapore	3–1	6–1	Friendly
2.	5 March 2014	Sharjah Stadium, Sharjah, United Arab Emirates	Iraq	1–3	1–3	2015 AFC Asian Cup qualification
3.	12 November 2015	Helong Stadium, Changsha, China	Bhutan	12–0	12–0	2018 FIFA World Cup qualification
4.	7 June 2017	Tianhe Stadium, Guangzhou, China	Philippines	6–1	8–1	Friendly
5.	7 June 2019	Tianhe Stadium, Guangzhou, China	Philippines	2–0	2–0	Friendly
6.	18 November 2019	Busan Asiad Main Stadium, Busan, South Korea	Hong Kong	2–0	2–0	2019 EAFF E-1 Football Championship
7.	15 June 2021	Sharjah Stadium, Sharjah, United Arab Emirates	Syria	1–0	3–1	2022 FIFA World Cup qualification

== Honours ==
=== Club ===
Beijing Guoan

- Chinese Super League: 2009
- Chinese FA Cup: 2018, 2025
- Chinese FA Super Cup: 2026

VfL Wolfsburg

- DFB-Pokal: 2014-15

=== Individual ===
- Chinese Football Association Young Player of the Year: 2012
- Chinese Super League Team of the Year: 2013, 2014
- Chinese FA Cup Most Valuable Player: 2018
