= Lei Tenglong =

Chinese footballer (born 1991)

Lei Tenglong 雷腾龙
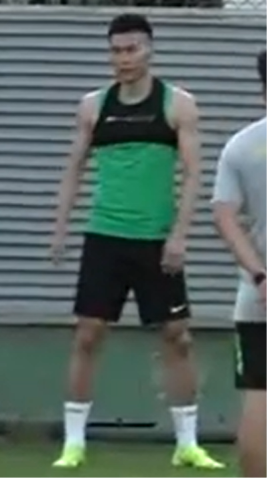
- Lei Tenglong in 2019

Personal information
- Full name: Lei Tenglong
- Date of birth: 17 January 1991 (age 35)
- Place of birth: Wuhan, Hubei, China
- Height: 1.84 m (6 ft 1/2 in)
- Position: Defender

Youth career
- 2003–2010: Beijing Guoan

Senior career*
Years	Team	Apps	(Gls)
2010	Beijing Guoan Talent	16	(0)
2011–2019	Beijing Guoan	107	(4)
2013–2014	→ Marítimo (loan)	0	(0)
2013–2014	→ Marítimo B (loan)	20	(0)
2020	Tianjin Teda	1	(0)
2021	Hebei FC	0	(0)

International career^{‡}
	China U20	14	(0)
	China U22	5	(0)
2015	China	1	(0)
Medal record
Representing China
Men's football
EAFF Championship
Silver medal – second place	2015 China	Team
- * Club domestic league appearances and goals as of 31 December 2021 ‡ National team caps and goals as of 30 October 2016

Lei Tenglong (simplified Chinese: 雷腾龙; traditional Chinese: 雷騰龍; pinyin: Léi Ténglóng; born 17 January 1991) is a former Chinese international footballer.

== Club career ==
Lei Tenglong started his football career in 2003 playing for Beijing Guoan's youth academy. He was then loaned to S.League side Beijing Guoan Talent during the 2010 season. He made his debut for the club on 12 February 2010 in a 1-0 loss against Étoile FC. He returned to Beijing in July 2010 and was promoted to the first team in 2011. He made his debut for the club on 25 April 2011 in a 3-0 win against Dalian Shide. He scored his first goal for the club on 6 July 2011 in a 3-0 win against Shanghai Shenhua. Lei played eight league matches in his debut season; however, he appeared in just one match during the 2012 season due to injury.

On 31 July 2013, Lei was loaned to Primeira Liga side Marítimo until 30 June 2014. He mostly played for Segunda Liga side Marítimo B and established himself as a starter for the club during the second half of the 2013-14 season. Upon his return from his loan spell Lei would go on to establish himself as regular within the Beijing team and went on to win the 2018 Chinese FA Cup with the club.

On 26 February 2020, Lei joined Tianjin TEDA on a 2-year deal. He would make his debut in a league game on 27 July 2020 in a 3-1 defeat to Shanghai Port. This would be his only appearance for the club as he was suffering from ankle and ligament damage throughout the entire season. On 30 July 2021, Lei joined Hebei F.C. on a free transfer. He would not make any appearances for Hebei and retired at the end of the season after he was unable to recover from his ankle and ligament injury.

== International career ==
Lei made his debut for the Chinese national team on 5 August 2015 in a 2-0 win against North Korea.

== Career statistics ==
=== Club statistics ===
As of 31 December 2021.

Appearances and goals by club, season and competition
Club	Season	League			National Cup		League Cup		Continental		Total	
Club	Season	Division	Apps	Goals	Apps	Goals	Apps	Goals	Apps	Goals	Apps	Goals
Beijing Guoan Talent	2010	S. League	16	0	1	0	1	0	-		18	0
Beijing Guoan	2011	Chinese Super League	7	1	1	0	-		-		8	1
Beijing Guoan	2012	Chinese Super League	1	0	0	0	-		0	0	1	0
Beijing Guoan	2013	Chinese Super League	6	1	0	0	-		1	0	7	1
Beijing Guoan	2014	Chinese Super League	10	0	0	0	-		-		10	0
Beijing Guoan	2015	Chinese Super League	15	0	0	0	-		2	0	17	0
Beijing Guoan	2016	Chinese Super League	25	1	4	0	-		-		29	1
Beijing Guoan	2017	Chinese Super League	23	0	2	0	-		-		25	0
Beijing Guoan	2018	Chinese Super League	14	1	3	0	-		-		17	1
Beijing Guoan	2019	Chinese Super League	6	0	3	0	-		0	0	9	0
Beijing Guoan	Total		107	4	13	0	0	0	3	0	123	4
Marítimo (loan)	2013-14	Primeira Liga	0	0	0	0	0	0	-		0	0
Marítimo B (loan)	2013-14	Segunda Liga	20	0	-		-		-		20	0
Tianjin TEDA	2020	Chinese Super League	1	0	0	0	-		-		1	0
Hebei F.C.	2021	Chinese Super League	0	0	0	0	-		-		0	0
Career total			144	4	14	0	1	0	3	0	162	4

=== International statistics ===
National team
Year	Apps	Goals
2015	1	0
Total	1	0

== Honours ==
=== Club ===
Beijing Guoan F.C.|Beijing Guoan

- Chinese FA Cup: 2018
