= Wang Changqing =

Chinese footballer

Wang Changqing 王长庆
Personal information
- Full name: Wang Changqing
- Date of birth: March 21, 1981 (age 45)
- Place of birth: Beijing, China
- Height: 1.78 m (5 ft 10 in)
- Position: Midfielder

Youth career
- 2001: Beijing Longli

Senior career*
Years	Team	Apps	(Gls)
2002–2005	Shaanxi Guoli	81	(11)
2006–2012	Beijing Guoan	90	(10)
2013–2015	Shanghai Shenhua	46	(0)
2015–2017	Beijing Enterprises	22	(1)
- * Club domestic league appearances and goals as of 28 October 2017

Wang Changqing (simplified Chinese: 王长庆; traditional Chinese: 王長慶; pinyin: Wáng Chángqìng) (born 21 March 1981 in Beijing) is a Chinese former football player.

== Club career ==
=== Shaanxi Guoli ===
Wang Changqing originally began his football career when he played for the Beijing Hongdeng youth team, however he would move to top tier team Shaanxi Guoli during the 2002 league season to begin his professional football career. While he was playing at the top tier Wang Changqing often found Shaanxi Guoli at the bottom the league table and by the 2003 league found them relegated at the end of the league season. He stayed with them throughout the 2004 league season, however he was unable to help them in their promotion push and saw them finish in a disappointing 12th at the end of the season. The 2005 league season was to prove even more disappointing when Shaanxi Guoli went bankrupt and disbanded during the 2005 league season.

=== Beijing Guoan ===
Wang Changqing was unable to play football until the 2005 league season finished, however he was able to return home to Beijing when Beijing Guoan were willing take him into their team at the beginning of the 2006 Chinese Super League season. Able to play in the top tier once more he would make his debut on May 13, 2006 against Liaoning FC in a 1-0 win. In his first season, he often found it difficult to establish himself as a team regular within the Beijing Guoan squad and found himself often coming on as substitute in many games and this continued throughout much of the next season, nevertheless Wang Changqing has continued to be regular squad player for the team.

=== Shanghai Shenhua ===
With his contract at Beijing Guoan coming to an end Wang transferred to Guoan's rival club Shanghai Shenhua on 1 January 2013 where would go on to make his debut in the club's first game of the 2013 Chinese Super League season against Tianjin Teda F.C. in a game that ended in a 0-0 draw. As the season progressed Wang quickly established himself as versatile regular who was often used as an emergency right-back. On the few occasions he was used in attacking positions he would score his first goal for the club on 22 May 2013 in a Chinese FA Cup game against Dali Travel Ruilong that ended in a 3-2 defeat.

=== Beijing Enterprises ===
On 7 July 2015, Wang transferred to China League One side Beijing Enterprises.

== Honours ==
Beijing Guoan

- Chinese Super League: 2009
