= Xue Fei (footballer) =

Chinese footballer

Xue Fei 薛飞
Personal information
- Date of birth: October 29, 1987 (age 39)
- Place of birth: Beijing, China
- Height: 1.83 m (6 ft 0 in)
- Position: Midfielder

Team information
- Current team: Sichuan Jiuniu
- Number: 14

Senior career*
| Years | Team | Apps | (Gls) |
| 2007–2010 | Beijing Guoan | 1 | (0) |
| 2011–2016 | Beijing Baxy | 43 | (2) |
| 2017– | Sichuan Jiuniu | 12 | (0) |
- * Club domestic league appearances and goals as of 13 October 2018

Xue Fei (Chinese: 薛飞; born 29 October 1987 in Beijing) is a Chinese football player who plays for China League Two side Sichuan Jiuniu.

== Club career ==
In 2007, Xue Fei started his professional footballer career with Chinese Super League side Beijing Guoan. He would eventually make his league debut for Beijing on 15 September 2009 in a game against Changchun Yatai, coming on as a substitute for Yang Hao in the 68th minute.

In March 2011, Xue transferred to China League One side Beijing Baxy.

== Club career statistics ==
Statistics accurate as of match played 13 October 2018.

| Club performance | | | League | | Cup | | League Cup | | Continental | | Total | |
| Season | Club | League | Apps | Goals | Apps | Goals | Apps | Goals | Apps | Goals | Apps | Goals |
| China PR | | | League | | FA Cup | | CSL Cup | | Asia | | Total | |
|---|---|---|---|---|---|---|---|---|---|---|---|---|
| 2007 | Beijing Guoan | Chinese Super League | 0 | 0 | - | | - | | - | | 0 | 0 |
| 2008 | Beijing Guoan | Chinese Super League | 0 | 0 | - | | - | | 0 | 0 | 0 | 0 |
| 2009 | Beijing Guoan | Chinese Super League | 1 | 0 | - | | - | | 0 | 0 | 1 | 0 |
| 2010 | Beijing Guoan | Chinese Super League | 0 | 0 | - | | - | | 0 | 0 | 0 | 0 |
| 2011 | Beijing Baxy | China League One | 14 | 0 | 0 | 0 | - | | - | | 14 | 0 |
| 2012 | Beijing Baxy | China League One | 1 | 0 | 0 | 0 | - | | - | | 1 | 0 |
| 2013 | Beijing Baxy | China League One | 17 | 2 | 0 | 0 | - | | - | | 17 | 2 |
| 2014 | Beijing Baxy | China League One | 8 | 0 | 0 | 0 | - | | - | | 8 | 0 |
| 2015 | Beijing Baxy | China League One | 0 | 0 | 2 | 0 | - | | - | | 2 | 0 |
| 2016 | Beijing Baxy | China League One | 3 | 0 | 2 | 0 | - | | - | | 5 | 0 |
| 2018 | Sichuan Jiuniu | China League Two | 12 | 0 | 3 | 0 | - | | - | | 15 | 0 |
| Total | China PR | | 56 | 2 | 7 | 0 | 0 | 0 | 0 | 0 | 63 | 2 |
