= Wang Ke (footballer) =

Chinese footballer

Wang Ke 王珂
Personal information
- Date of birth: August 31, 1983 (age 43)
- Place of birth: Qingdao, Shandong, China
- Height: 1.68 m (5 ft 6 in)
- Position: Midfielder

Youth career
- 1998–2000: Shanghai Shenhua

Senior career*
Years	Team	Apps	(Gls)
2000–2008	Shanghai Shenhua	96	(7)
2008–2010	Beijing Guoan	33	(0)
2011	Qingdao QUST	2	(0)
2019	Jilin Baijia	2	(0)
Medal record
Men's football
Representing China
East Asian Games
Gold medal – first place	2001 Macau	Football
- * Club domestic league appearances and goals as of 12 October 2019

Wang Ke (Chinese: 王珂; born August 31, 1983, in Qingdao) is a Chinese former football player.

== Club career ==
=== Shanghai Shenhua ===
Wang Ke began his career with Shanghai Shenhua playing for the youth team and graduated to the senior team in 2000. During his time with the youth team he was selected to play in São Paulo football club youth team and was teammates with Kaka. While at Shanghai Shenhua he spent several seasons gradually establishing himself as a regular within the team and would even win the 2003 league title with the team. In 2013 the Chinese Football Association would revoke the league title after it was discovered the Shenhua General manager Lou Shifang had bribed officials to be bias to Shenhua in games that season. While he spent several further seasons with the team he would struggle to establish himself as a first team starter and after eight seasons he was allowed to leave the club.

=== Beijing Guoan ===
He was transferred to Beijing Guoan at the beginning of the 2008 league season for a fee of 1,400,000 RMB. As with Shanghai Shenhua and despite being predominantly a right midfielder he spent much of his time as a substitute where he has come in to play a variety of midfield positions. While this would see him be part of the squad that went on to win the 2009 Chinese Super League title, Wang never went further than being a squad player within the team and was released at the end of the 2010 league campaign.

== Honours ==
Shanghai Shenhua

- Chinese Jia-A League: 2003 (revoked due to match-fixing scandal)

Beijing Guoan

- Chinese Super League: 2009
