= Zhang Yonghai =

Chinese footballer

Zhang Yonghai 张永海
Personal information
- Full name: Zhang Yonghai
- Date of birth: 15 March 1979 (age 47)
- Place of birth: Panjin, Liaoning, China
- Height: 1.83 m (6 ft 0 in)
- Position: Defender

Youth career
- 1998–2000: Liaoning FC

Senior career*
Years	Team	Apps	(Gls)
2001–2006	Liaoning FC	118	(18)
2005	→ Shenzhen Jianlibao (loan)	5	(0)
2007–2013	Beijing Guoan	106	(1)
2012	→ Guangdong Sunray Cave (loan)	0	(0)
2013	→ Shanghai Shenxin (loan)	11	(1)
2014	Liaoning Whowin	2	(0)
2014	Chengdu Tiancheng	10	(0)

International career^{‡}
2005–2008	China	9	(1)

Managerial career
- 2022-2024: Liaoning Tieren (assistant)
Medal record
Representing China
Men's football
EAFF Championship
Gold medal – first place	2005 South Korea	Team
Bronze medal – third place	2008 China	Team
- * Club domestic league appearances and goals as of 12 November 2014 ‡ National team caps and goals as of 5 November 2012

Zhang Yonghai (simplified Chinese: 张永海; traditional Chinese: 張永海; pinyin: Zhāng Yǒnghǎi; born 15 March 1979) is a Chinese former professional footballer who played as a defender.

== Club career ==
Zhang Yonghai started his football career with Liaoning FC youth team where he eventually graduated to the senior Liaoning team in 2001. After several seasons with Liaoning FC where he would establish himself as a regular within the team he would join reigning league champions Shenzhen Jianlibao in the 2005 league season for a season long loan period. He returned to Liaoning for another season until the beginning of 2007 league season saw him transfer to Beijing Guoan for 4,000,000 RMB. He would gradually establish himself as a regular in defence and by the 2008 league season he would be named as vice-captain. In the 2009 league season he would go on to aid Beijing to win the 2009 Chinese Super League title. On 28 February 2014, Zhang transferred to Chinese Super League side Liaoning Whowin.

On 18 July 2014, Zhang transferred to China League One side Chengdu Tiancheng.

== International career ==
Zhang Yonghai would begin his international career on 26 March 2005, when he played in a friendly against Spain in a 3-0 defeat. Under the Chinese Head coach Zhu Guanghu he would play in several more friendlies and play in the 2005 East Asian Cup where he would score his first goal. He would, however, be dropped soon afterwards until the next Chinese head coach Vladimir Petrović would include him in several further friendlies but would once again drop him soon afterwards.

== Personal life ==
His son Zhang Jiaming is also a footballer, currently playing for China League One club Liaoning Tieren.

== Career statistics ==
=== Club statistics ===
Season	Team	Country	Division	Apps	Goals
2001	Liaoning FC	China	1	23	0
2002	Liaoning FC	China	1	24	1
2003	Liaoning FC	China	1	25	1
2004	Liaoning FC	China	1	21	2
2005	Shenzhen Jianlibao	China	1	18	0
2006	Liaoning FC	China	1	25	1
2007	Beijing Guoan	China	1	20	0
2008	Beijing Guoan	China	1	20	0
2009	Beijing Guoan	China	1	21	0
2010	Beijing Guoan	China	1	25	1
2011	Beijing Guoan	China	1	20	0
2012	Guangdong Sunray Cave	China	2	0	0
2012	Beijing Guoan	China	1	1	0
2013	Beijing Guoan	China	1	1	0
2013	Shanghai Shenxin	China	1	11	1
2014	Liaoning Whowin	China	1	2	0
2014	Chengdu Tiancheng	China	2	10	0

=== International goals ===
#	Date	Venue	Opponent	Score	Result	Competition
1.	August 3, 2005	Daejeon, Korea Republic	Japan	2-2	Drew	East Asian Football Championship 2005

== Honours ==
Beijing Guoan

- Chinese Super League: 2009
