= Yan Xiangchuang =

Chinese footballer

Yan Xiangchuang 阎相闯
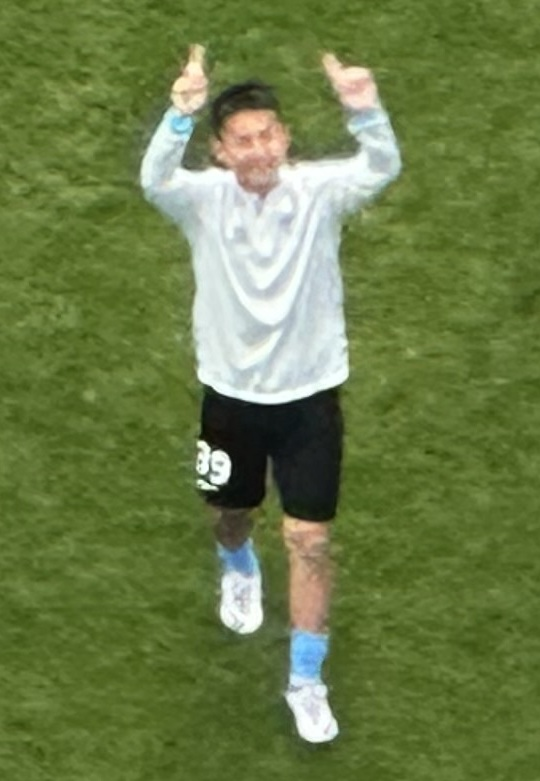
- Yan Xiangchuang in May 2025

Personal information
- Full name: Yan Xiangchuang
- Date of birth: 5 September 1986 (age 40)
- Place of birth: Dalian, Liaoning, China
- Height: 1.74 m (5 ft 9 in)
- Position: Forward

Team information
- Current team: Dalian Yingbo B (assistant coach)

Youth career
- 2000–2003: Bayi

Senior career*
Years	Team	Apps	(Gls)
2004–2011	Beijing Guoan	156	(18)
2011	→ Dalian Shide (Loan)	15	(2)
2012	Dalian Shide	27	(3)
2013	Dalian Aerbin	0	(0)
2013	Guizhou Renhe	10	(0)
2014	Harbin Yiteng	14	(1)
2015–2021	Beijing BSU	175	(37)
2022–2023	Dalian Pro	53	(9)
2024–2025	Dalian Yingbo	30	(3)

International career^{‡}
2010–2011	China	7	(1)

Managerial career
- 2026–: Dalian Yingbo B (assistant)
- * Club domestic league appearances and goals as of 28 January 2024 ‡ National team caps and goals as of 15 July 2011

Yan Xiangchuang (simplified Chinese: 阎相闯; traditional Chinese: 閻相闖; pinyin: Yán Xiàngchuǎng; born 5 September 1986) is a Chinese former international footballer who played as a forward.

== Club career ==
After graduating through the Bayi youth team he would move to Beijing Guoan in 2004 to begin his professional football career. He eventually made his senior debut on 26 May 2004, against Shenyang Ginde. A squad player at first he would show his attacking instincts when he scored his debut league goal against Inter Shanghai on 11 September 2005, in a 3–1 victory. After playing in several attacking positions within the team he was moved to the right wing where his pace and attacking instincts would see him establish himself as an integral member of the team.

After helping Beijing progress each season higher within the league he would eventually help the team win the 2009 league title. The following season saw Yan unable to replicate the same success he had with the team and the club brought in Honduras international Walter Julián Martínez into the club. Martínez would go on to establish himself as the team's first choice right midfielder and during the 2011 league season Yan was allowed to go on loan to his home town of Dalian and join Dalian Shide for the rest of the season.

On 3 July 2014, Yan transferred to Chinese Super League side Harbin Yiteng. He would make his debut in a league game on 20 July 2014 against Guizhou Moutai in a 4–0 victory. Unfortunately he would be part of the squad that was relegated at the end of 2014 Chinese Super League campaign.

On 5 February 2015, Yan transferred to China League One side Beijing Enterprises Group. He would establish himself as an integral member of the team for the next several seasons until his contract expired and on 21 April 2022 he joined top tier club Dalian Pro for the start of the 2022 Chinese Super League season. He made his debut in a league game on 4 June 2022 against Henan Songshan Longmen in a match that ended in a 2–2 draw.

In January 2024, Yan joined another Dalian club Dalian Zhixing in China League One.

On 19 July 2025, Yan decided to retire from professional football after the home game against Shandong Taishan.

== Coaching career ==
On 18 March 2026, Yan was named as the assistant coach of Dalian Yingbo B for 2026 China League Two season.

== International career ==
Yan Xiangchuang would be called up to the Chinese national team and would make his debut in a friendly against Tajikistan on 26 June 2010, in a 4–0 victory where he would also score in his debut.

== Career statistics ==
=== Club statistics ===
As of 31 December 2022.

Appearances and goals by club, season and competition
Club	Season	League			National Cup		Continental		Other		Total	
Club	Season	Division	Apps	Goals	Apps	Goals	Apps	Goals	Apps	Goals	Apps	Goals
Beijing Guoan	2004	Chinese Super League	6	1	1	0	-		-		7	1
Beijing Guoan	2005	Chinese Super League	13	2	3	0	-		-		16	2
Beijing Guoan	2006	Chinese Super League	25	3	1	0	-		-		26	3
Beijing Guoan	2007	Chinese Super League	27	8	-		-		-		27	8
Beijing Guoan	2008	Chinese Super League	21	0	-		6	2	-		27	2
Beijing Guoan	2009	Chinese Super League	29	4	-		4	0	-		33	4
Beijing Guoan	2010	Chinese Super League	27	0	-		6	0	-		33	0
Beijing Guoan	2011	Chinese Super League	8	0	1	0	-		-		9	0
Beijing Guoan	Total		156	18	6	0	16	2	0	0	178	20
Dalian Shide (Loan)	2011	Chinese Super League	15	2	0	0	-		-		15	2
Dalian Shide	2012	Chinese Super League	27	3	0	0	-		-		27	3
Guizhou Renhe	2013	Chinese Super League	10	0	1	1	-		-		11	1
Harbin Yiteng	2014	Chinese Super League	14	1	0	0	-		-		14	1
Beijing BSU	2015	China League One	29	6	4	1	-		-		33	7
Beijing BSU	2016	China League One	29	7	0	0	-		-		29	7
Beijing BSU	2017	China League One	27	5	0	0	-		-		27	5
Beijing BSU	2018	China League One	23	2	1	0	-		-		24	2
Beijing BSU	2019	China League One	24	5	0	0	-		-		24	5
Beijing BSU	2020	China League One	14	6	-		-		-		14	6
Beijing BSU	2021	China League One	29	6	0	0	-		-		29	6
Beijing BSU	Total		175	37	5	1	0	0	0	0	180	37
Dalian Professional	2022	Chinese Super League	28	4	1	0	-		-		29	4
Career total			425	65	13	2	16	2	0	0	454	69

== Honours ==
Beijing Guoan

- Chinese Super League: 2009
