= Yu Yang (footballer, born 1989) =

Chinese footballer

Yu Yang 于洋
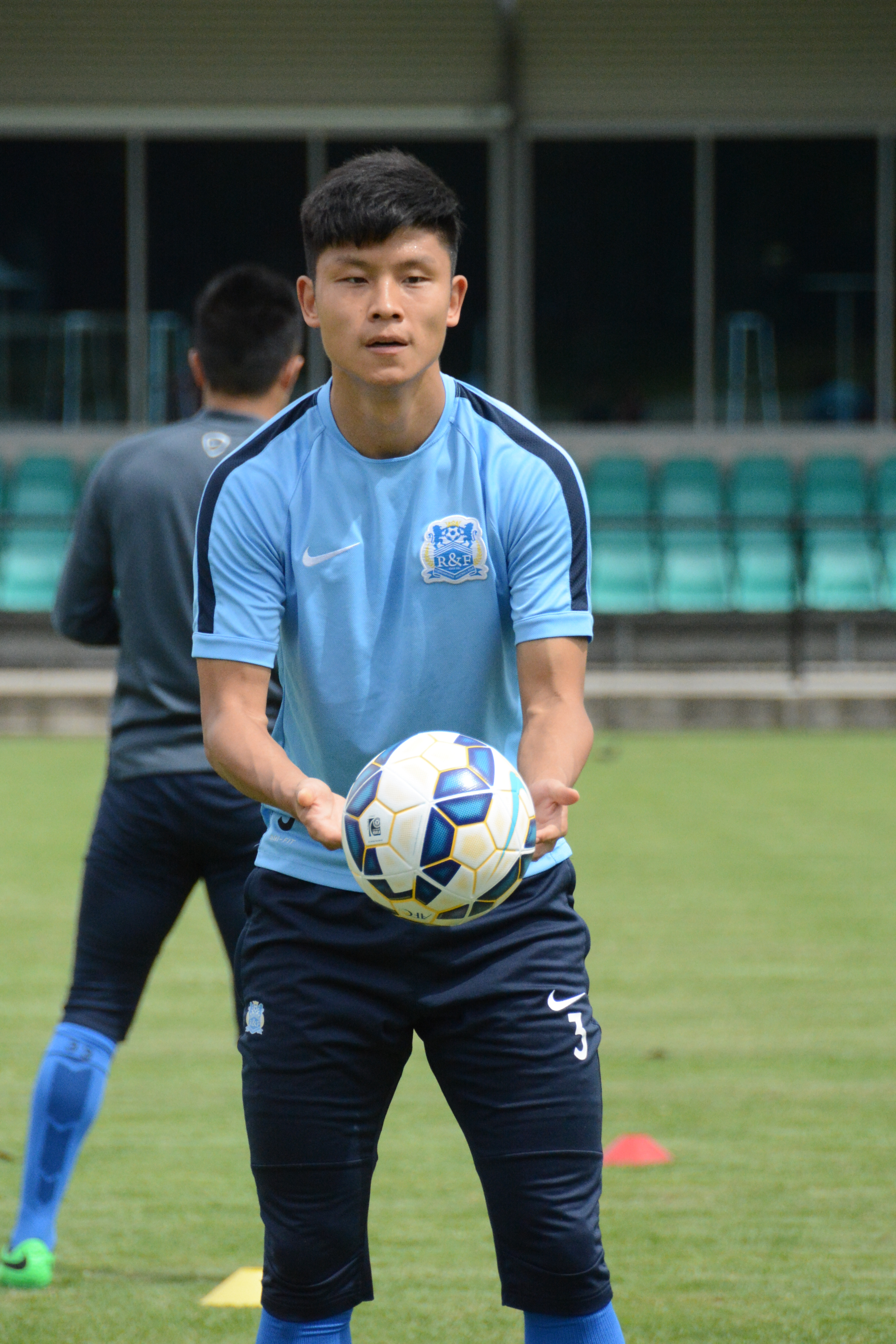

Personal information
- Full name: Yu Yang
- Date of birth: 6 August 1989 (age 37)
- Place of birth: Tianjin, China
- Height: 1.83 m (6 ft 0 in)
- Position: Centre-back

Senior career*
Years	Team	Apps	(Gls)
2008–2014	Beijing Guoan	50	(1)
2010	→ Dalian Aerbin (loan)	11	(0)
2015–2016	Guangzhou R&F	42	(0)
2017–2022	Beijing Guoan	104	(5)
2023–2024	Tianjin Jinmen Tiger	16	(0)
Total		223	(6)

International career^{‡}
2012–2018	China	14	(0)

Managerial career
- 2026: Foshan Nanshi (assistant)
Medal record
Representing China
Men's football
EAFF Championship
Silver medal – second place	2015 China	Team
- * Club domestic league appearances and goals as of 26 February 2023 ‡ National team caps and goals as of 28 December 2018

Yu Yang (Chinese: 于洋; pinyin: Yú Yáng; born 6 August 1989) is a Chinese former professional footballer who played as a centre-back.

== Club career ==
Yu Yang started his football career playing for Beijing Guoan's youth academy before eventually being promoted up to the senior squad and would go on to make his debut on 29 June 2008 in a 2-0 loss against Shanghai Shenhua. Yu would make four appearances at the end of the season; however, the following campaign he did not play in the team that won the 2009 top-tier league title. He would instead be loaned out to third-tier club Dalian Aerbin during the 2010 season and would go on to actually win the division title with the club. When Yu returned to Beijing at the beginning of the 2011 season, Jaime Pacheco was introduced as the new manager and he included him back into the first team. This saw him repay him by scoring his first goal for the club on 30 May 2011 against Shenzhen Ruby in a 4-0 win. While Yu only played in two league games throughout the 2011 season, Pacheco would go on make him a first team regular the following season.

On 9 December 2014, Yu transferred to fellow Chinese Super League side Guangzhou R&F. On 30 December 2016, Yu returned to Beijing Guoan. He would make is return appearance for the club in the first league game of the 2017 Chinese Super League season on 5 March 2017 against Guangzhou Evergrande in a game that ended in a 2-1 defeat. Throughout the season he would establish himself as a vital member of the team and in the following season help the club go on the win the 2018 Chinese FA Cup against Shandong Luneng. Yu left Guoan at the end of the 2022 Chinese Super League season when his contracted finished. On 4 April 2023 he would join fellow top tier club Tianjin Jinmen Tiger on a free transfer.

On 12 December 2024, Yu confirmed that he is retired from professional football and become a youth football coach of Tianjin team to prepare the National Games of China in 2025. On 2 April 2025, Tianjin Jinmen Tiger held a retirement ceremony for Yu ahead of a Chinese Super League game against his former club Beijing Guoan. Both team presented commemorative jerseys for Yu.

== Coaching career ==
On 12 March 2026, Yu was named as the assistant coach of China League One club Foshan Nanshi.

== International career ==
Yu made his debut for the Chinese national team on 8 June 2012 in a 3-0 win against Vietnam.

== Career statistics ==
=== Club statistics ===
Appearances and goals by club, season and competition
Club	Season	League			National Cup		Continental		Other		Total	
Club	Season	Division	Apps	Goals	Apps	Goals	Apps	Goals	Apps	Goals	Apps	Goals
Beijing Guoan	2008	Chinese Super League	5	0	-		1	0	-		6	0
Beijing Guoan	2009	Chinese Super League	0	0	-		0	0	-		0	0
Beijing Guoan	2010	Chinese Super League	0	0	-		0	0	-		0	0
Beijing Guoan	2011	Chinese Super League	2	1	3	0	-		-		5	1
Beijing Guoan	2012	Chinese Super League	26	0	1	0	5	0	-		32	0
Beijing Guoan	2013	Chinese Super League	4	0	2	0	0	0	-		6	0
Beijing Guoan	2014	Chinese Super League	13	0	0	0	5	1	-		18	1
Beijing Guoan	Total		50	1	6	0	11	1	0	0	67	2
Dalian Aerbin (loan)	2010	China League Two	11	0	-		-		-		11	0
Guangzhou R&F	2015	Chinese Super League	17	0	1	0	1	0	-		19	0
Guangzhou R&F	2016	Chinese Super League	25	0	5	0	-		-		30	0
Guangzhou R&F	Total		42	0	6	0	1	0	0	0	49	0
Beijing Guoan	2017	Chinese Super League	29	3	2	0	-		-		31	3
Beijing Guoan	2018	Chinese Super League	24	1	7	0	-		-		31	1
Beijing Guoan	2019	Chinese Super League	12	0	3	0	2	0	0 (Note: Appearances in Chinese FA Super Cup)	0	17	0
Beijing Guoan	2020	Chinese Super League	17	1	0	0	6	0	-		23	1
Beijing Guoan	2021	Chinese Super League	12	0	0	0	0	0	-		12	0
Beijing Guoan	2022	Chinese Super League	10	0	1	0	-		-		11	0
Beijing Guoan	Total		104	5	13	0	8	0	0	0	125	5
Tianjin Jinmen Tiger	2023	Chinese Super League	12	0	2	0	-		-		14	0
Tianjin Jinmen Tiger	2024	Chinese Super League	4	0	2	0	-		-		6	0
Tianjin Jinmen Tiger	Total		16	0	4	0	0	0	0	0	20	0
Career total			223	6	29	0	20	1	0	0	272	7

=== International ===
National team
Year	Apps	Goals
2012	4	0
2013	1	0
2014	2	0
2015	1	0
2016	0	0
2017	0	0
2018	6	0
Total	14	0

== Honours ==
=== Club ===
Beijing Guoan

- Chinese Super League: 2009
- Chinese FA Cup: 2018

Dalian Aerbin

- China League Two: 2010
