= 2016 Beijing Guoan F.C. season =

Beijing Guoan
2016 season
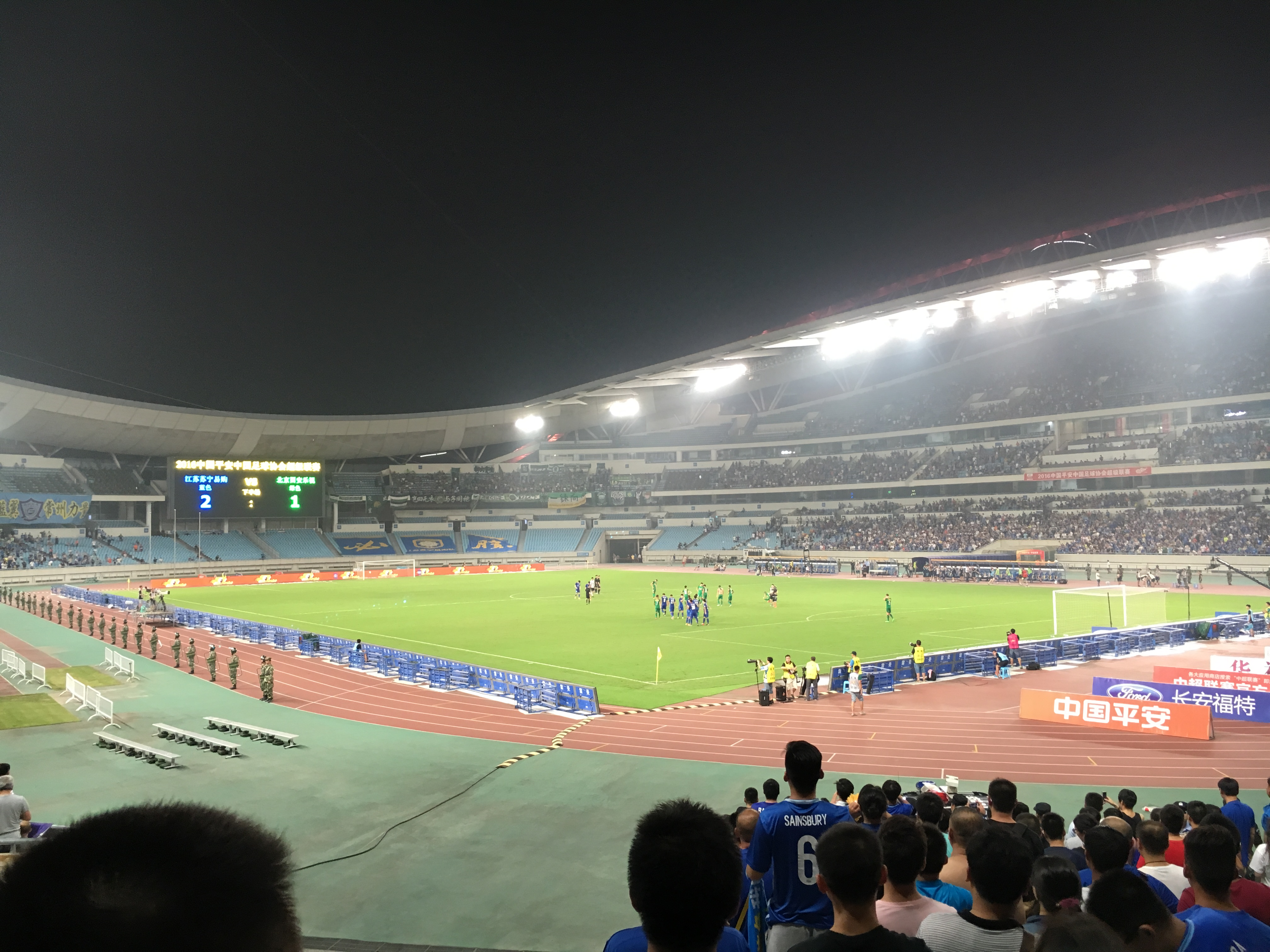
- Chairman: Li Jianyi
- Manager: Alberto Zaccheroni; (until 21 May); Xie Feng (interim); (21 May–present)
- Stadium: Workers Stadium
- Super League: 5th
- FA Cup: Fifth round
- Average home league attendance: 36,543
Home colours	Away colours

The 2016 Beijing Guoan F.C. season was their 13th consecutive season in the Chinese Super League, established in 2004, and 26th consecutive season in the top flight of Chinese football. They competed at the Chinese Super League and Chinese FA Cup.

== Players ==
=== First team ===
As of July 16, 2016

Note: Flags indicate national team as defined under FIFA eligibility rules; some limited exceptions apply. Players may hold more than one non-FIFA nationality.

No.	Pos.	Nation	Player
1	GK	CHN	Zhao Shi
2	DF	UZB	Egor Krimets (on loan from Pakhtakor Tashkent)
3	DF	CHN	Li Lei
4	DF	CHN	Zhou Ting (3rd captain)
5	MF	BRA	Ralf
6	MF	CHN	Zhang Xiaobin
7	FW	CHN	Zhang Chiming
8	MF	CHN	Piao Cheng
10	MF	CHN	Zhang Xizhe
11	MF	CHN	Song Boxuan
13	DF	CHN	Xu Yunlong (Captain)
15	FW	UZB	Igor Sergeev (on loan from Pakhtakor Tashkent)
16	MF	CHN	Du Mingyang
17	FW	TUR	Burak Yılmaz
18	DF	CHN	Lang Zheng

No.	Pos.	Nation	Player
19	FW	CHN	Yu Dabao
20	DF	CHN	Zhang Xinxin
21	MF	BRA	Renato Augusto
22	GK	CHN	Yang Zhi (Vice-captain)
23	MF	CHN	Yang Yun
24	DF	CHN	Li Hanbo
25	GK	CHN	Hou Sen
26	FW	CHN	Shan Huanhuan
28	MF	CHN	Zhang Chengdong
30	DF	CHN	Lei Tenglong
31	DF	CHN	Zhao Hejing
32	DF	CHN	Wei Xin
33	GK	CHN	Zhang Yan
56	DF	CHN	Sheng Pengfei

=== Reserve team ===
As of July 16, 2016

Note: Flags indicate national team as defined under FIFA eligibility rules; some limited exceptions apply. Players may hold more than one non-FIFA nationality.

No.	Pos.	Nation	Player
41	GK	CHN	Guo Quanbo
42	MF	CHN	Geng Junyi
43	DF	CHN	Huang Chao
44	MF	CHN	Xue Mengtao
45	MF	CHN	Shi Beisi
46	DF	CHN	Wang Xiaole
47	MF	CHN	Wen Wubin
48	DF	CHN	Li Siqi
50	MF	CHN	Wu Guichao

No.	Pos.	Nation	Player
51	MF	CHN	Tang Hai
52	DF	CHN	Cai Peilei
53	MF	CHN	He Yuan
55	MF	CHN	Xu Ziteng
58	FW	CHN	Xu Ziyue
61	DF	CHN	Wang Haitao
62	MF	CHN	Ke Yi
63	DF	CHN	Wu Bo
65	DF	CHN	Huang Jiajing
66	DF	CHN	Yang Kaideng

== Transfers ==
=== Winter ===
In:

No.	Pos.	Nation	Player
2	DF	UZB	Egor Krimets (loan from (Uzbekistan) Pakhtakor Tashkent)
5	MF	BRA	Ralf (from (Brazil) Corinthians)
6	MF	CHN	Zhang Xiaobin (loan return from Chongqing Lifan)
17	FW	TUR	Burak Yılmaz (from (Turkey) Galatasaray)
21	MF	BRA	Renato Augusto (from (Brazil) Corinthians)
23	DF	CHN	Yang Yun (loan return from Liaoning Whowin)
28	DF	CHN	Zhang Chengdong (loan return from (Spain) Rayo Vallecano)

Out:

No.	Pos.	Nation	Player
2	DF	CHN	Li Yunqiu (to Shanghai Shenhua)
5	MF	CRO	Darko Matić (to Changchun Yatai)
9	FW	CHN	Tan Tiancheng (to Yinchuan Helanshan)
10	FW	MNE	Dejan Damjanović (to (South Korea) FC Seoul)
15	GK	CHN	Shi Xiaotian (loan return to Liaoning Whowin)
16	MF	KOR	Ha Dae-Sung (to (Japan) FC Tokyo)
17	MF	ARG	Pablo Batalla (to (Turkey) Bursaspor)
21	FW	KOS	Erton Fejzullahu (to Dalian Transcendence)
23	MF	CHN	Chen Zhizhao (to Guangzhou R&F)
26	MF	CHN	Wang Hao (Released)
29	MF	CHN	Shao Jiayi (Retired)
34	MF	CHN	Ba Dun (loan to Meizhou Kejia)
36	MF	CHN	Tong Le (Released)
38	MF	CHN	Du Shuaishuai (Released)
39	DF	CHN	Li Bowen (loan to Meizhou Kejia)
40	MF	CHN	Cao Hanchen (Released)
41	FW	CHN	Qin Beichen (to Shenyang Urban)
42	MF	CHN	Fan Yang (to Zhejiang Yiteng)
43	FW	CHN	Zhu Chaoqing (loan to Sichuan Longfor)
45	DF	CHN	Wang Junming (Released)
46	FW	CHN	He Lilong (Released)
47	DF	CHN	Zhang Yu (Released)
48	FW	CHN	Gong Zheng (to Beijing BG)
53	MF	CHN	Hu Zhuqi (Released)
54	DF	CHN	Zhang Shuai (to Shenzhen Renren)

=== Summer ===
In:

No.	Pos.	Nation	Player
15	FW	UZB	Igor Sergeev (loan from (Uzbekistan) Pakhtakor Tashkent)
61	DF	CHN	Wang Haitao (from Beijing BG)

Out:

No.	Pos.	Nation	Player
9	FW	BRA	Kléber (to (Portugal) Estoril)
14	DF	CHN	Jin Pengxiang (loan to Tianjin Quanjian)
35	MF	CHN	Li Tixiang (to Shijiazhuang Ever Bright)
49	MF	CHN	Wang Hongyu (loan to Beijing BIT)
54	MF	CHN	Zhong Jiyu (loan to Beijing BIT)
57	MF	CHN	Tang Fan (loan to Beijing BIT)
60	GK	CHN	Zhang Hao (to Shijiazhuang Ever Bright)

== Club ==
=== Coaching staff ===
Position	Staff
Head coach	(China) Xie Feng
Assistant coach	(China) Xu Yunlong
Assistant coach	(China) Zhou Ting
Goalkeeping coach	(China) Li Leilei
Fitness coach	(China) Xue Shen
Team physicians	(China) Shuang Yin (China) Zhang Yang (China) Wang Kai (Germany) Lukas Ditczyk
Reserve team head coach	(China) Sui Dongliang
Reserve team coach	(China) Cui Lizhi
Reserve team goalkeeping coach	(China) Liu Peng
Reserve team physician	(China) Shen Xiaowan
U-19 team head coach	(China) Huang Yong
U-19 team coach	(China) Ma Quan
U-19 team goalkeeping coach	(China) Jiang Xinyuan
U-19 team fitness coach	(China) Zhang Pei
U-19 team physician	(China) Zhu Jianghua
U-17 team head coach	(China) Lu Ming
U-17 team Physician	(China) Liu Li

== Friendlies ==
=== Pre-season ===
8 January 2016 Friendly	Yanbian Fude (China)	2 – 2	Beijing Guoan	Haikou, Hainan
15:30 UTC+8	Cui Ren; Jin Bo		Tan Tiancheng; Du Mingyang

14 January 2016 Friendly	Qingdao Huanghai (China)	0 – 1	Beijing Guoan	Haikou, Hainan
15:00 UTC+8			Tan Tiancheng

30 January 2016 Friendly	Hebei Elite (China)	0 – 2	Beijing Guoan	Kunming, Yunnan
16:00 UTC+8			Zhang Xiaobin 82'; Zhang Xizhe 90+1' (pen.)	Stadium: Hongta Sports Center

3 February 2016 Friendly	Shanghai Shenxin (China)	1 – 1	Beijing Guoan	Kunming, Yunnan
15:30 UTC+8	Biro-Biro 55'		Zhang Xizhe 19'	Stadium: Hongta Sports Center

16 February 2016 Friendly	FK Obod Tashkent (Uzbekistan)	1 – 1	Beijing Guoan	Dubai
16:00 UTC+4	Zhang Chengdong (o.g.)		Li Hanbo

19 February 2016 Friendly	FC United Zürich (Switzerland)	0 – 3	Beijing Guoan	Dubai
16:00 UTC+4			Jin Pengxiang; Renato Augusto; Song Boxuan

24 February 2016 Friendly	Ajman Club (United Arab Emirates)	0 – 8	Beijing Guoan	Dubai
16:00 UTC+4			Zhang Chiming; Yu Dabao; Zhu Chaoqing; Li Hanbo; Li Lei; Yang Yun (pen.)

4 March 2016 Friendly	Beijing Institute of Technology F.C. (China)	0 – 3	Beijing Guoan	Beijing
15:00 UTC+8			Renato Augusto (pen.); Yu Dabao (pen.)	Stadium: Workers' Stadium

=== Mid–season ===
26 March 2016 Friendly	Hebei Elite (China)	0 – 6	Beijing Guoan	Beijing
15:30 UTC+8			Kléber; Li Hanbo; Li Lei; Lei Tenglong; Shan Huanhuan

1 September 2016 Friendly	Hebei China Fortune	2 – 1	Beijing Guoan	Beijing
15:30 UTC+8				Stadium: Workers' Stadium

5 October 2016 2016 Jingjinji Champions Cup	Hebei China Fortune	2 – 0	Beijing Guoan	Qinhuangdao
19:30 UTC+8	Dong Xuesheng 55', 70'			Stadium: Qinhuangdao Olympic Sports Center Stadium; Referee: Zhang Xiaochen

8 October 2016 2016 Jingjinji Champions Cup	Tianjin Teda (China)	1 – 0	Beijing Guoan	Qinhuangdao
15:30 UTC+8	Zhang Yu 89' (o.g.)			Stadium: Qinhuangdao Olympic Sports Center Stadium; Referee: Fu Ming

== Competitions ==
=== Chinese Super League ===
==== Table ====
Pos	Team	Pld	W	D	L	GF	GA	GD	Pts	Qualification or relegation
3	Shanghai SIPG	30	14	10	6	56	32	+24	52	Qualification to Champions League play-off round
4	Shanghai Greenland Shenhua (Note: Shanghai Greenland Shenhua qualified for the 2017 AFC Champions League qualifying play-offs round as Guangzhou Evergrande Taobao and Jiangsu Suning are 2016 Chinese FA Cup finalists.)	30	12	12	6	46	31	+15	48	Qualification to Champions League play-off round
5	Beijing Guoan	30	11	10	9	34	26	+8	43	
6	Guangzhou R&F	30	11	7	12	47	50	−3	40	
7	Hebei China Fortune	30	11	7	12	34	38	−4	40	

Source: Sina Sports
Rules for classification: 1) Points; 2) Head-to-head points; 3) Head-to-head goal difference; 4) Head-to-head goals scored; 5) Reserve league points; 6) Goal difference; 7) Goals scored; 8) Disciplinary points (1 point for each yellow card, 3 points for each red card)

==== Matches ====
16 March 2016 1	Tianjin Teda	0 – 0	Beijing Guoan	Tianjin
19:35 UTC+8		Beijing Guoan report		Stadium: Tianjin Olympic Center Stadium; Attendance: 36,820; Referee: Ma Ning

2 April 2016 3	Yanbian Funde	1 – 0	Beijing Guoan	Yanji
15:00 UTC+8	Ha Tae-kyun 17'	Beijing Guoan report		Stadium: Yanji Nationwide Fitness Centre Stadium; Attendance: 22,251; Referee: Chen Gang

9 April 2016 4	Beijing Guoan	0 – 3	Guangzhou Evergrande Taobao	Beijing
19:35 UTC+8		Beijing Guoan report	Gao Lin 26'; Goulart 44', 80'	Stadium: Workers Stadium; Attendance: 53,080; Referee: Wang Di

17 April 2016 5	Hangzhou Greentown	0 – 3	Beijing Guoan	Hangzhou
19:35 UTC+8		Beijing Guoan report	Yılmaz 63'; Zhang Xizhe 64'; Augusto 77' (pen.)	Stadium: Yellow Dragon Sports Center; Attendance: 10,298; Referee: Zhang Long

23 April 2016 6	Beijing Guoan	0 – 0	Liaoning Whowin	Beijing
19:35 UTC+8		Beijing Guoan report		Stadium: Workers Stadium; Attendance: 39,771; Referee: Shi Zhenlu

30 April 2016 7	Chongqing Lifan	1 – 1	Beijing Guoan	Chongqing
19:35 UTC+8	Liu Yu 83'	Beijing Guoan report	Zhang Xiaobin 81'	Stadium: Chongqing Olympic Sports Center; Attendance: 41,258; Referee: Lin Jun

8 May 2016 8	Beijing Guoan	1 – 2	Jiangsu Suning	Beijing
19:35 UTC+8	Zhao Hejing 24'	Beijing Guoan report	Sammir 14'; Li Ang 64'	Stadium: Workers Stadium; Attendance: 41,755; Referee: Hei Xiaohu

14 May 2016 9	Beijing Guoan	2 – 1	Shanghai SIPG	Beijing
19:35 UTC+8	Ralf 24'; Zhang Xizhe 50'	Beijing Guoan report	Evrard 31'	Stadium: Workers Stadium; Attendance: 38,005; Referee: Zhou Gang

18 May 2016 2	Beijing Guoan	0 – 2	Hebei China Fortune	Beijing
19:35 UTC+8		Beijing Guoan report	Dong Xuesheng 45+2'; Gervinho 51'	Stadium: Workers Stadium; Attendance: 37,677; Referee: Ma Ning

22 May 2016 10	Shijiazhuang Ever Bright	1 – 1	Beijing Guoan	Shijiazhuang
19:35 UTC+8	Guan Zhen 36' (pen.)	Beijing Guoan report	Augusto 53'	Stadium: Yutong International Sports Center; Attendance: 22,816; Referee: Wang Di

29 May 2016 11	Shandong Luneng Taishan	0 – 2	Beijing Guoan	Jinan
19:35 UTC+8		Beijing Guoan report	Yu Dabao 13'; Zhang Chiming 59'	Stadium: Jinan Olympic Sports Center Stadium; Attendance: 31,531; Referee: Lin Jun

12 June 2016 12	Beijing Guoan	2 – 0	Changchun Yatai	Beijing
19:35 UTC+8	Zhang Xizhe 58' (pen.); Yu Dabao 63'	Beijing Guoan report		Stadium: Workers Stadium; Attendance: 37,661; Referee: Wang Jing

19 June 2016 13	Guangzhou R&F	1 – 1	Beijing Guoan	Guangzhou
15:30 UTC+8	Giannou 45'	Beijing Guoan report	Piao Cheng 26'	Stadium: Yuexiushan Stadium; Attendance: 9,876; Referee: Shi Zhenlu

25 June 2016 14	Beijing Guoan	2 – 1	Shanghai Greenland Shenhua	Beijing
19:35 UTC+8	Zhang Xizhe 66', 69'	Beijing Guoan report	Ba 83'	Stadium: Workers Stadium; Attendance: 43,370; Referee: Ma Ning

2 July 2016 15	Henan Jianye	1 – 0	Beijing Guoan	Zhengzhou
19:35 UTC+8	Feng Zhuoyi 90'	Beijing Guoan report		Stadium: Zhengzhou Hanghai Stadium; Attendance: 20,779; Referee: Hei Xiaohu

9 July 2016 16	Beijing Guoan	0 – 0	Tianjin Teda	Beijing
19:35 UTC+8		Beijing Guoan report		Stadium: Workers Stadium; Attendance: 43,979; Referee: Shi Zhenlu

16 July 2016 17	Hebei China Fortune	0 – 1	Beijing Guoan	Qinhuangdao
19:35 UTC+8		Beijing Guoan report	Ding Haifeng 2' (o.g.)	Stadium: Qinhuangdao Olympic Sports Center Stadium; Attendance: 24,033; Referee: Chen Gang

29 July 2016 20	Beijing Guoan	1 – 0	Hangzhou Greentown	Beijing
19:35 UTC+8	Zhang 84'	Beijing Guoan report		Stadium: Workers Stadium; Attendance: 35,308; Referee: Shi Zhenlu

9 August 2016 19	Guangzhou Evergrande Taobao	0 – 0	Beijing Guoan	Guangzhou
19:35 UTC+8		Beijing Guoan report		Stadium: Tianhe Stadium; Referee: Zhou Gang

12 August 2016 22	Beijing Guoan	1 – 2	Chongqing Lifan	Beijing
19:35 UTC+8	Yılmaz 80' (pen.)	Beijing Guoan report	Wang Dong 28' (pen.); Kardec 39'	Stadium: Workers Stadium; Attendance: 31,801; Referee: Wang Di

21 August 2016 23	Jiangsu Suning	2 – 1	Beijing Guoan	Nanjing
19:35 UTC+8	Martínez 48', 76'	Beijing Guoan report	Yılmaz 9'	Stadium: Nanjing Olympic Sports Centre; Attendance: 45,377; Referee: Lin Jun

9 September 2016 24	Shanghai SIPG	2 – 2	Beijing Guoan	Shanghai
19:35 UTC+8	Hulk 50', 90' (pen.)	Beijing Guoan report	Yılmaz 67' (pen.); Lei Tenglong 82'	Stadium: Shanghai Stadium; Attendance: 26,017; Referee: Zhou Gang

14 September 2016 21	Liaoning Whowin	0 – 2	Beijing Guoan	Shenyang
19:35 UTC+8		Beijing Guoan report	Yılmaz 77' (pen.), 89'	Stadium: Tiexi New District Sports Center; Referee: Chen Gang

18 September 2015 25	Beijing Guoan	0 – 0	Shijiazhuang Ever Bright	Beijing
19:35 UTC+8		Beijing Guoan report		Stadium: Workers Stadium; Attendance: 33,047; Referee: Ma Ning

21 September 2016 18	Beijing Guoan	3 – 0	Yanbian Funde	Beijing
19:35 UTC+8	Yılmaz 10', 22'; Augusto 36'		Beijing Guoan report	Stadium: Workers Stadium; Attendance: 31,526; Referee: Zhang Long

25 September 2015 26	Beijing Guoan	1 – 2	Shandong Luneng Taishan	Beijing
19:35 UTC+8	Yılmaz (penalty missed) 26'; Yu Dabao 43'	Beijing Guoan report	Pellè 12'; Montillo 76' (pen.)	Stadium: Workers Stadium; Attendance: 38,079; Referee: Lin Jun

16 October 2015 27	Changchun Yatai	2 – 1	Beijing Guoan	Changchun
15:30 UTC+8	Fan Xiaodong 24'; Moreno 46'	Beijing Guoan report	Sergeev 18'	Stadium: Development Area Stadium; Attendance: 8,219; Referee: Wang Di

22 October 2015 28	Beijing Guoan	3 – 1	Guangzhou R&F	Beijing
16:00 UTC+8	Yılmaz 24' (pen.); Yu Dabao 52'; Du Mingyang 74'	Beijing Guoan report	Ye Chugui 84'	Stadium: Workers Stadium; Attendance: 33,145; Referee: Wang Jing

26 October 2015 29	Shanghai Greenland Shenhua	0 – 0	Beijing Guoan	Shanghai
19:35 UTC+8		Beijing Guoan report		Stadium: Hongkou Football Stadium; Attendance: 23,651; Referee: Lin Jun

30 October 2015 30	Beijing Guoan	3 – 1	Henan Jianye	Beijing
19:35 UTC+8	Augusto 38'; Yılmaz 67', 72'	Beijing Guoan report	Sow 87'	Stadium: Workers Stadium; Attendance: 33,447; Referee: Zhou Gang

=== Chinese FA Cup ===
11 May 2016 Third round	Xinjiang Tianshan Leopard	0 – 3	Beijing Guoan	Ürümqi
20:00 UTC+8		Beijing Guoan report	Krimets 58'; Augusto 85'; Du Mingyang 90+2'	Stadium: Xinjiang Sports Centre; Referee: Chen Gang

29 June 2016 Fourth round	Hangzhou Greentown	1 – 3	Beijing Guoan	Hangzhou
19:35 UTC+8	Chen Po-liang 87'	Beijing Guoan report	Zhang Chiming 49', 69'; Augusto 67'	Stadium: Yellow Dragon Sports Center; Referee: Dong Kun

13 July 2016 First leg	Guangzhou Evergrande Taobao	2 – 1	Beijing Guoan	Guangzhou
20:00 UTC+8	Gao Lin 9', 39' (penalty missed) 82'	Beijing Guoan report	Mei Fang 28' (og.)	Stadium: Tianhe Stadium; Referee: He Xiaohu

26 July 2016 Second leg	Beijing Guoan	1 – 2 (2–4 agg.)	Guangzhou Evergrande Taobao	Beijing
19:35 UTC+8	Yu 24'		Paulinho 36'; Gao Lin 47'	Stadium: Workers' Stadium; Attendance: 41,663; Referee: Wang Di
