= 2017 Beijing Sinobo Guoan F.C. season =

Beijing Sinobo Guoan
2017 season
- Chairman: Li Jianyi
- Manager: José González (23 November 2016–2 June 2017); Xie Feng (caretaker) (2 June 2017–1 July 2017); Roger Schmidt (From 1 July 2017)
- Stadium: Workers Stadium
- Super League: 9th
- FA Cup: Fourth round
- Top goalscorer: League: Jonathan Soriano (16); All: Jonathan Soriano (19)
- Highest home attendance: 54,018 vs Guangzhou Evergrande Taobao (8 July 2017)
- Lowest home attendance: 23,609 vs Tianjin TEDA (18 June 2017)
- Average home league attendance: 34,684
Home colours	Away colours

The 2017 Beijing Sinobo Guoan F.C. season was their 14th consecutive season in the Chinese Super League, established in the 2004 season, and 27th consecutive season in the top flight of Chinese football. They competed in the Chinese Super League and Chinese FA Cup.

== First team ==
As of August 2, 2017

Note: Flags indicate national team as defined under FIFA eligibility rules; some limited exceptions apply. Players may hold more than one non-FIFA nationality.

No.	Pos.	Nation	Player
1	GK	CHN	Hou Sen
2	DF	UZB	Egor Krimets
3	DF	CHN	Yu Yang
4	DF	CHN	Li Lei
5	MF	BRA	Ralf
6	MF	CHN	Zhang Xiaobin
7	MF	CHN	Zhang Chiming
8	MF	CHN	Piao Cheng
9	FW	ESP	Jonathan Soriano
10	MF	CHN	Zhang Xizhe
11	MF	CHN	Song Boxuan
14	DF	CHN	Jin Pengxiang
15	FW	CHN	Zhu Chaoqing
16	MF	CHN	Du Mingyang
18	MF	CHN	Jin Taiyan
19	MF	CHN	Yu Dabao

No.	Pos.	Nation	Player
20	DF	CHN	Zhang Xinxin
21	MF	BRA	Renato Augusto
22	GK	CHN	Yang Zhi (Captain)
23	MF	CHN	Tang Shi
24	MF	CHN	Li Hanbo
25	GK	CHN	Guo Quanbo
26	MF	CHN	Lü Peng
27	MF	CHN	Wu Guichao
28	DF	CHN	Jiang Tao
29	MF	CHN	Ba Dun
30	DF	CHN	Lei Tenglong
31	DF	CHN	Zhao Hejing
33	GK	CHN	Zhang Yan
34	DF	CHN	Huang Chao
35	FW	CHN	Ning Weichen

== Transfers ==
=== Winter ===
In:

No.	Pos.	Nation	Player
3	DF	CHN	Yu Yang (from Guangzhou R&F)
9	FW	ESP	Jonathan Soriano (from (Austria) Red Bull Salzburg)
14	DF	CHN	Jin Pengxiang (loan return from Tianjin Quanjian)
15	FW	CHN	Zhu Chaoqing (loan return from Sichuan Longfor)
18	MF	CHN	Jin Taiyan (from Liaoning Whowin)
23	MF	CHN	Tang Shi (loan from Meizhou Kejia)
26	MF	CHN	Lü Peng (from Beijing BG)
28	DF	CHN	Jiang Tao (from Qingdao Huanghai)
29	MF	CHN	Ba Dun (loan return from Meizhou Kejia)
-	MF	CHN	Wang Hongyu (loan return from Beijing BIT)
-	MF	CHN	Zhong Jiyu (loan return from Beijing BIT)
-	MF	CHN	Tang Fan (loan return from Beijing BIT)
-	DF	CHN	Li Bowen (loan return from Meizhou Kejia)

Out:

No.	Pos.	Nation	Player
1	GK	CHN	Zhao Shi (to Qingdao Huanghai)
4	DF	CHN	Zhou Ting (to Dalian Yifang)
13	DF	CHN	Xu Yunlong (Retired)
15	FW	UZB	Igor Sergeev (loan return to (Uzbekistan) Pakhtakor Tashkent)
18	DF	CHN	Lang Zheng (to Hebei China Fortune)
23	MF	CHN	Yang Yun (Released)
26	FW	CHN	Shan Huanhuan (Released)
28	MF	CHN	Zhang Chengdong (to Hebei China Fortune)
49	MF	CHN	Wang Hongyu (loan to Beijing BIT)
54	MF	CHN	Zhong Jiyu (loan to Beijing BIT)
57	MF	CHN	Tang Fan (to Beijing BIT)
56	DF	CHN	Sheng Pengfei (loan to Dalian Boyang)
61	DF	CHN	Wang Haitao (Released)
-	DF	CHN	Li Bowen (loan to Beijing BIT)

=== Summer ===
In:

No.	Pos.	Nation	Player
35	MF	CHN	Ning Weichen (from (Portugal) CD Cova da Piedade)
62	DF	CHN	Zhang Zijian (from Shenyang Dongjin)
63	DF	CHN	Huang Tao (from Shenyang Dongjin)
-	MF	CHN	Wang Ziming (from Qingdao Jonoon)

Out:

No.	Pos.	Nation	Player
17	FW	TUR	Burak Yılmaz (to (Turkey) Trabzonspor)
-	MF	CHN	Wang Ziming (loan to Qingdao Jonoon)

== Staff ==
Position	Staff
Team leader	(China) Fu Bin
Head coach	(Germany) Roger Schmidt
Assistant coach	(Austria) Richard Kitzbichler
Assistant coach	(China) Tao Wei
Goalkeeping coach	(Germany) Michael Kraft
Fitness coach	(England) Oliver Bartlett
Analyst	(China) Cheng Jun
Trainer-Coordinator	(Germany) Jörn Wolf
Mental coach	(Republic of Ireland) Jim McGuinness
Team physician	(China) Jin Ri
Team physician	(China) Wang Kai
Team physician	(Germany) Lukas Ditczyk
Team physician	(Germany) Steffen Lutz
Kit manager	(China) Kang Yuming
Kit manager	(China) Liu Peng

== Friendlies ==
=== Pre-season ===
19 January 2017 Friendly	Hainan Boying (China)	0–1	Beijing Sinobo Guoan	Haikou, Hainan
			Ba Dun 8'

22 January 2017 Friendly	Dalian Boyoung (China)	0–6	Beijing Sinobo Guoan	Haikou, Hainan
			Zhu Chaoqing 13'; Li Hanbo 18'; Yu Dabao 53', 62'; Zhang Yu 71'; Tang Hai 85'

24 January 2017 Friendly	Dalian Boyoung (China)	0–2	Beijing Sinobo Guoan	Haikou, Hainan
			Zhang Xizhe 28' (pen.); Zhu Chaoqing

4 February 2017 Friendly	Puskás Akadémia (Hungary)	2–0	Beijing Sinobo Guoan	Marbella, Spain
				Stadium: Marbella Football Center

7 February 2017 Friendly	Shonan Bellmare (Japan)	3–1	Beijing Sinobo Guoan	Marbella, Spain
			Renato Augusto (pen.)

11 February 2017 Friendly	UD San Pedro-Marbella United B (Spain)	0–6	Beijing Sinobo Guoan	Marbella, Spain
			Zhang Xiaobin; Wu Guichao; Zhu Chaoqing; Renato Augusto	Stadium: Marbella Football Center

14 February 2017 Friendly	Dynamo Kyiv (Ukraine)	1–0	Beijing Sinobo Guoan	Marbella, Spain
				Stadium: Marbella Football Center

18 February 2017 Friendly	Lokomotiv Moscow (Russia)	1–1	Beijing Sinobo Guoan	Marbella, Spain
				Stadium: Marbella Football Center

21 February 2017 Friendly	Hobro IK (Denmark)	1–1	Beijing Sinobo Guoan	Marbella, Spain
				Stadium: Marbella Football Center

=== Mid–season ===
1 September 2017 Jingjinji Champions Cup	Beijing Sinobo Guoan	1–3	(China) Tianjin Quanjian	Beijing, China
16:00 UTC+8	Liu Sheng 69' (o.g.)		Wang Xiaolong 35'; Modeste 36'; Sun Ke 71'	Stadium: Workers' Stadium; Referee: Wang Jing

3 September 2017 Jingjinji Champions Cup	Beijing Sinobo Guoan	1–3	(China) Tianjin Teda	Beijing, China
16:00 UTC+8	Li Siqi 23'		Diagne 8'; Wang Qiuming 44'; Wang Dong 52'	Stadium: Workers' Stadium; Referee: Kou Jianxun

11 October 2017 Friendly	Beijing BIT (China)	2–4	Beijing Sinobo Guoan	Beijing, China
	Gong Zheng 9'; Li Sichen		Soriano 38'; Li Hanbo; Zhu Chaoqing

== Competitions ==
=== Chinese Super League ===
==== Table ====
Pos	Team	Pld	W	D	L	GF	GA	GD	Pts	Qualification or relegation
7	Changchun Yatai	30	12	8	10	46	41	+5	44	
8	Guizhou Hengfeng Zhicheng	30	12	6	12	39	45	−6	42	
9	Beijing Sinobo Guoan	30	11	7	12	42	42	0	40	
10	Chongqing Dangdai Lifan	30	9	9	12	37	40	−3	36	
11	Shanghai Greenland Shenhua (Note: Shanghai Greenland Shenhua qualified for the 2018 AFC Champions League group stage as 2017 Chinese FA Cup winners.)	30	9	8	13	52	55	−3	35	Qualification to Champions League group stage

Source: League table
Rules for classification: 1) Points; 2) Head-to-head points; 3) Head-to-head goal difference; 4) Head-to-head goals scored; 5) Reserve league points; 6) Goal difference; 7) Goals scored; 8) Disciplinary points (1 point for each yellow card, 3 points for each red card); 9) Draw

==== Matches ====
5 March 2017 1	Guangzhou Evergrande Taobao	2–1	Beijing Sinobo Guoan	Guangzhou
19:35 UTC+8	Paulinho 18', 86'	Report	Yılmaz 37' (pen.)	Stadium: Tianhe Stadium; Attendance: 47,998; Referee: Hei Xiaohu

11 March 2017 2	Guizhou Hengfeng Zhicheng	1–1	Beijing Sinobo Guoan	Guiyang
15:30 UTC+8	Baise 22'	Report	Yılmaz 43'	Stadium: Guiyang Olympic Sports Center; Attendance: 21,532; Referee: Shi Zhenlu

2 April 2017 3	Beijing Sinobo Guoan	2–1	Shanghai Greenland Shenhua	Beijing
19:35 UTC+8	Yılmaz 37', 87'	Report	Cao Yunding 40'	Stadium: Workers' Stadium; Attendance: 53,056; Referee: Ma Ning

7 April 2017 4	Beijing Sinobo Guoan	1–0	Henan Jianye	Beijing
19:35 UTC+8	Zhang Chiming 76'	Report		Stadium: Workers' Stadium; Attendance: 32,738; Referee: Wang Jing

15 April 2017 5	Shandong Luneng Taishan	1–0	Beijing Sinobo Guoan	Jinan
19:35 UTC+8	Wu Xinghan 37'	Report		Stadium: Jinan Olympic Sports Center Stadium; Attendance: 43,658; Referee: Shi Zhenlu

21 April 2017 6	Beijing Sinobo Guoan	1–1	Tianjin Quanjian	Beijing
19:35 UTC+8	Li Lei 82'	Report	Sun Ke 42'	Stadium: Workers' Stadium; Attendance: 30,042; Referee: Zhou Gang

29 April 2017 7	Liaoning F.C.	2–4	Beijing Sinobo Guoan	Shenyang
15:30 UTC+8	Lukimya-Mulongoti 58'; Chamanga 90+2'	Report	Yu Dabao 45+1'; Soriano 48'; Augusto 69', 85'	Stadium: Shenyang Olympic Sports Center Stadium; Attendance: 13,775; Referee: Gu Chunhan

7 May 2017 8	Beijing Sinobo Guoan	1–4	Hebei China Fortune	Beijing
19:35 UTC+8	Soriano 4' (pen.)	Report	Li Hang 28'; Aloísio 43', 84'; Zhao Yuhao 49'	Stadium: Workers' Stadium; Attendance: 31,943; Referee: Zhang Long

13 May 2017 9	Yanbian Funde	1–2	Beijing Sinobo Guoan	Yanji
15:30 UTC+8	Steve 33'	Report	Yılmaz 28', 53'	Stadium: Yanji Nationwide Fitness Centre Stadium; Attendance: 15,210; Referee: Zhou Gang

19 May 2017 10	Beijing Sinobo Guoan	2–2	Guangzhou R&F	Beijing
18:00 UTC+8	Zhang Chiming 68'; Song Boxuan 90+4'	Report	Zahavi 52'; Xiao Zhi 54'	Stadium: Workers' Stadium; Attendance: 28,251; Referee: Lin Jun

27 May 2017 11	Shanghai SIPG	5–1	Beijing Sinobo Guoan	Shanghai
19:35 UTC+8	Wei Shihao 26', 52'; Hulk 57'; Wu Lei 76', 84'		Yılmaz 90'	Stadium: Shanghai Stadium; Attendance: 30,377; Referee: Li Haixin

2 June 2017 12	Chongqing Dangdai Lifan	1–0	Beijing Sinobo Guoan	Chongqing
19:35 UTC+8	Wu Qing 6'			Stadium: Chongqing Olympic Sports Center; Attendance: 34,687; Referee: Ma Ning

18 June 2017 13	Beijing Sinobo Guoan	2–0	Tianjin TEDA	Beijing
19:35 UTC+8	Yılmaz 30'; Augusto 61'	Report		Stadium: Workers' Stadium; Attendance: 23,609; Referee: Wang Di

26 June 2017 14	Beijing Sinobo Guoan	0–0	Jiangsu Suning	Beijing
19:35 UTC+8		Report		Stadium: Workers' Stadium; Attendance: 28,458; Referee: Zhang Long

1 July 2017 15	Changchun Yatai	2–1	Beijing Sinobo Guoan	Changchun
15:30 UTC+8	Ighalo 21'; Fan Xiaodong 40'	Report	Soriano 75' (pen.)	Stadium: Development Area Stadium; Attendance: 15,686; Referee: Lin Jun

8 July 2017 16	Beijing Sinobo Guoan	2–0	Guangzhou Evergrande Taobao	Beijing
19:35 UTC+8	Soriano 1', 51'	Report		Stadium: Workers' Stadium; Attendance: 54,018; Referee: Ma Ning

15 July 2017 17	Beijing Sinobo Guoan	2–0	Guizhou Hengfeng Zhicheng	Beijing
19:35 UTC+8	Soriano 38' (pen.); Zhang Chiming 56'	Report		Stadium: Workers' Stadium; Attendance: 35,898; Referee: Zhou Gang

23 July 2017 18	Shanghai Greenland Shenhua	1–2	Beijing Sinobo Guoan	Shanghai
19:35 UTC+8	Moreno 32'	Report	Soriano 31', 48' (pen.)	Stadium: Hongkou Football Stadium; Attendance: 19,895; Referee: Li Haixin

28 July 2017 19	Henan Jianye	0–2	Beijing Sinobo Guoan	Zhengzhou
19:35 UTC+8		Report	Soriano 44', 58' (pen.)	Stadium: Zhengzhou Hanghai Stadium; Attendance: 21,169; Referee: Shi Zhenlu

5 August 2017 20	Beijing Sinobo Guoan	2–2	Shandong Luneng Taishan	Beijing
19:35 UTC+8	Ba Dun 24'; Li Lei 30'	Report	Pellè 13'; Cissé 45+3'	Stadium: Workers' Stadium; Attendance: 53,906; Referee: Wang Di

10 August 2017 21	Tianjin Quanjian	2–2	Beijing Sinobo Guoan	Tianjin
19:35 UTC+8	Zheng Dalun 18'; Pato 34' (pen.)	Report	Zhang Xizhe 50'; Yu Yang 55'	Stadium: Haihe Educational Football Stadium; Attendance: 26,018; Referee: Li Haixin

13 August 2017 22	Beijing Sinobo Guoan	4–0	Liaoning F.C.	Beijing
19:35 UTC+8	Soriano 36', 80' (pen.); Augusto 58'; Zhang Xizhe 63' (pen.)	Report		Stadium: Workers' Stadium; Attendance: 30,164; Referee: Wang Jing

19 August 2017 23	Hebei China Fortune	2–0	Beijing Sinobo Guoan	Qinhuangdao
19:35 UTC+8	Lavezzi 65' (pen.); Li Hang 89'	Report		Stadium: Qinhuangdao Olympic Sports Center Stadium; Attendance: 25,223; Referee: Zhou Gang

10 September 2017 24	Beijing Sinobo Guoan	4–4	Yanbian Funde	Beijing
19:35 UTC+8	Yu Yang 3', 55'; Soriano 49', 69'	Report	Steve 28' (pen.), 36', 89'; Guzmics 40'	Stadium: Workers' Stadium; Attendance: 28,966; Referee: Wang Jing

16 September 2017 25	Guangzhou R&F	2–1	Beijing Sinobo Guoan	Guangzhou
19:35 UTC+8	Chen Zhizhao 29'; Zahavi 69'	Report	Soriano 61'	Stadium: Yuexiushan Stadium; Referee: Ma Ning

22 September 2017 26	Beijing Sinobo Guoan	0–1	Shanghai SIPG	Beijing
19:35 UTC+8		Report	Oscar 31'	Stadium: Workers' Stadium; Attendance: 37,182; Referee: Shi Zhenlu

22 October 2017 28	Tianjin TEDA	2–0	Beijing Sinobo Guoan	Tianjin
19:35 UTC+8	Diagne 15' (pen.), 67'	Report		Stadium: Tianjin Olympic Center Stadium; Referee: Wang Jing

25 October 2017 27	Beijing Sinobo Guoan	1–0	Chongqing Dangdai Lifan	Beijing
19:35 UTC+8	Zhang Xizhe 62' (pen.) (red card) 85'	Report	Chen Lei (red card) 85'	Stadium: Workers' Stadium; Referee: Deniz Aytekin (Germany)

29 October 2017 29	Jiangsu Suning	1–0	Beijing Sinobo Guoan	Nanjing
15:00 UTC+8	Moukandjo 84'	Report		Stadium: Nanjing Olympic Sports Centre; Referee: Ted Unkel (United States)

4 November 2017 30	Beijing Sinobo Guoan	1–2	Changchun Yatai	Beijing
15:00 UTC+8	Soriano 75' (pen.)	Report	Marinho 65' (pen.); Tan Long 90'	Stadium: Workers' Stadium; Referee: Viktor Kassai (Hungary)

=== Chinese FA Cup ===
3 May 2017 Third round	Beijing Renhe	0–5	Beijing Sinobo Guoan	Beijing
15:30 UTC+8			Yu Dabao 8'; Soriano 25', 70', 90+1'; Zhang Xizhe 63'	Stadium: Beijing Fengtai Stadium; Attendance: 13,856; Referee: Wang Jing

21 June 2017 Fourth round	Shanghai Greenland Shenhua	1–0	Beijing Sinobo Guoan	Shanghai
20:00 UTC+8	Fredy Guarín 52'			Stadium: Hongkou Football Stadium; Attendance: 15,669; Referee: Shi Zhenlu

== National team ==
No.	Player	Team	From	To
	Shan Huanhuan	China U19	February 20, 2017	February 28, 2017
23	Tang Shi	China U22	March 13, 2017	March 29, 2017
10	Zhang Xizhe	China	March 16, 2017	March 29, 2017
19	Yu Dabao	China	March 16, 2017	March 29, 2017
33	Zhang Yan	China U20	May 2, 2017	May 9, 2017
4	Li Lei	China B	May 15, 2017	May 17, 2017
23	Tang Shi	China B	May 15, 2017	May 17, 2017
