= Renato Augusto =

Brazilian footballer (born 1988)

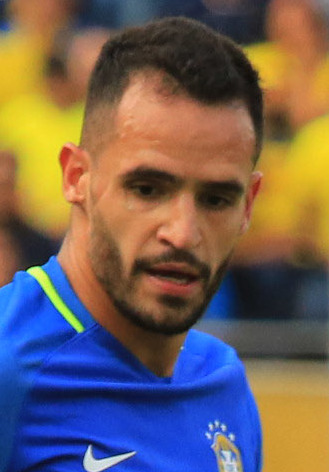
- Augusto with Brazil in 2016

Personal information
- Full name: Renato Soares de Oliveira Augusto
- Date of birth: 8 February 1988 (age 38)
- Place of birth: Rio de Janeiro, Brazil
- Height: 1.86 m (6 ft 1 in)
- Position: Midfielder

Youth career
- 2001–2005: Flamengo

Senior career*
Years	Team	Apps	(Gls)
2005–2008	Flamengo	76	(6)
2008–2012	Bayer Leverkusen	101	(9)
2013–2015	Corinthians	97	(10)
2016–2021	Beijing Guoan	122	(35)
2021–2023	Corinthians	94	(10)
2024–2025	Fluminense	28	(1)
Total		518	(71)

International career
2005	Brazil U17	4	(1)
2007	Brazil U20	3	(0)
2016	Brazil Olympic	6	(0)
2011–2018	Brazil	32	(6)
Medal record
Olympic Games
Gold medal – first place	2016 Rio de Janeiro	Team
- * Club domestic league appearances and goals

Renato Soares de Oliveira Augusto (born 8 February 1988) is a Brazilian former professional footballer who played as a midfielder. From 2011 to 2018, he played for the Brazil national team, scoring six goals in thirty-two appearances.

== Club career ==
=== Flamengo ===
Renato was hailed as one of the best products of Flamengo's youth academy in recent years, and had been close to a deal with Palermo in 2007. His style of play, combining decisive passes with good control of the ball, pace and dribbling efforts led him to being capped for Brazil at under-20 level; his career with Flamengo had nevertheless been plagued by injuries.

=== Bayer Leverkusen ===
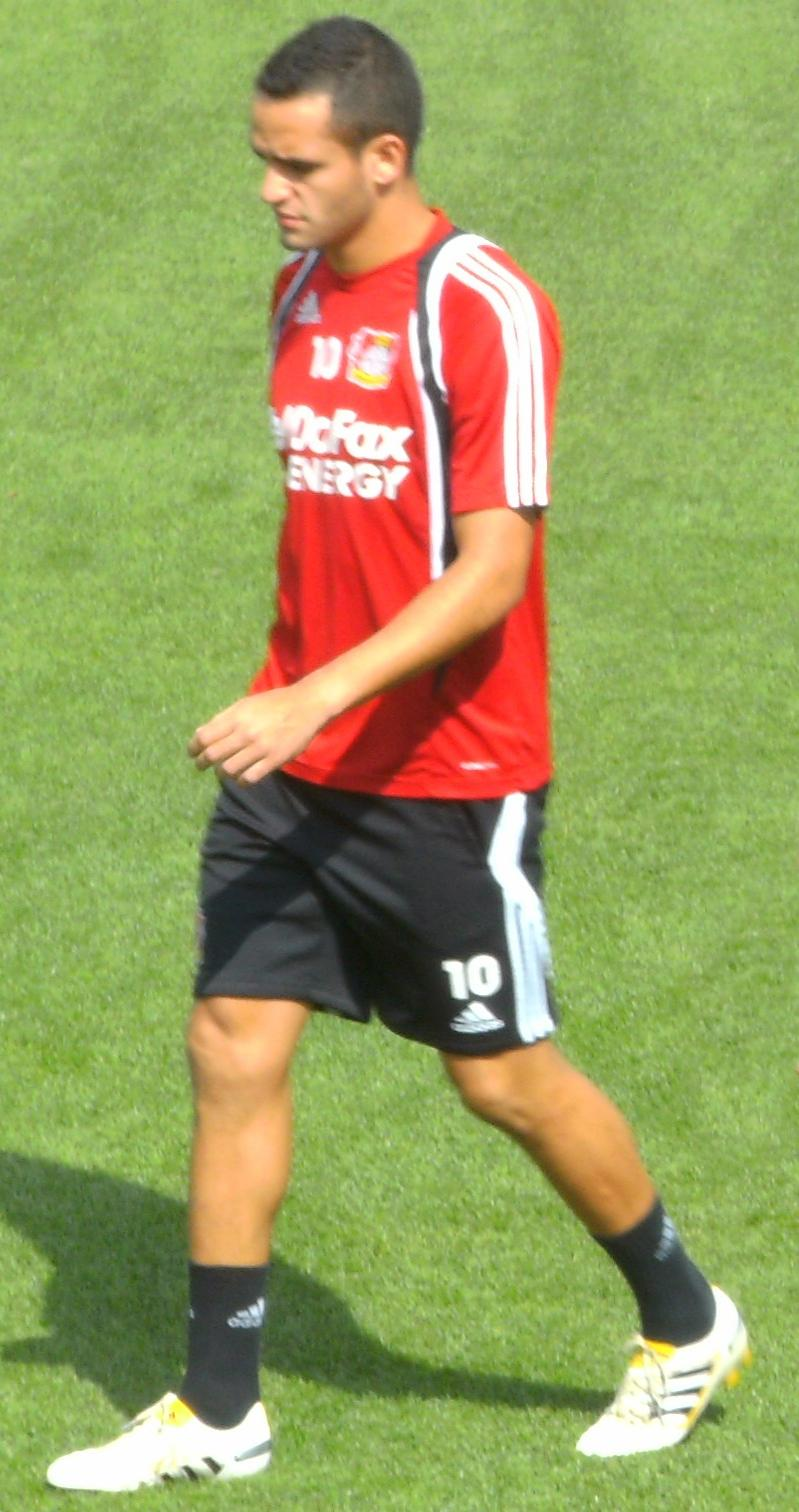
Renato Augusto in 2010

Renato signed for German Bundesliga club Bayer Leverkusen for an unknown fee, though thought to be €10 million, 60% of which was retained by Flamengo; the remaining 40% were owned by the Traffic and MFD investment groups, that paid €1.5 million each for a share in Renato Augusto's transfer fee, earlier in 2008.

Renato made an immediate impact, becoming one of the fan favorites very quickly with his swiftness, awareness, teamwork, and his technical abilities. Despite usually playing on the right side, with Leverkusen, he began playing in the hole, just behind the striker.

Despite being plagued with injury in the 2010–11 season, just like the previous ones in Germany, Augusto maintained stellar form, scoring on three occasions in one-goal lead victories. On 13 March, he scored a memorable goal where he scored a match-winner in 82nd minute against Mainz 05, giving Bayer Leverkusen a valuable victory, and vaulting them into the title race.

=== Corinthians ===
On 20 December 2012, Bayer Leverkusen confirmed that Renato would leave for Corinthians for a reported fee of €3.5 million. In 2014, after being properly diagnosed and treated, he played 44 games in the year, and in 2015, he was awarded the Bola de Ouro (Golden Ball) for leading Corinthians to the Campeonato Brasileiro Série A title.

=== Beijing Guoan ===
On 6 January 2016, Renato joined Chinese club Beijing Guoan for a reported fee of €8 million. On 16 March 2016, Augusto made his Guoan debut in a 0-0 away draw at Tianjin TEDA, and scored his first goal for the club on 17 April in a 3-0 away win against Hangzhou Green Town. On 11 March 2018, he captained Guoan for the first time in a 2-1 away win against Jiangsu Suning. On 25 August 2018, he scored his first hat trick for the club in a 5-2 away win against Tianjin TEDA. On 30 November 2018, he captained Guoan to win the 2018 Chinese FA Cup after a 2-2 away draw (aggregated 3-3 draw, Guoan won on away goals) against Shandong Luneng, the club's first major trophy in 9 years. On 20 April 2019, he made his 100th appearance for Beijing Guoan in a game against Hebei China Fortune.

=== Return to Corinthians ===
On 22 July 2021, after terminating his contract with Beijing Guoan, Renato returned to Corinthians, signing a deal until 31 December 2023.

At the end of the 2023 season, Corinthians announced Renato's departure from the club.

=== Fluminense ===
On 5 January 2024, Renato signed a two-year contract with Série A club Fluminense.

=== Retirement ===
On 18 September 2025, Renato officially announced his retirement. The former player revealed that he had consulted with others about continuing in the field, working on a committee or as an executive.

== International career ==
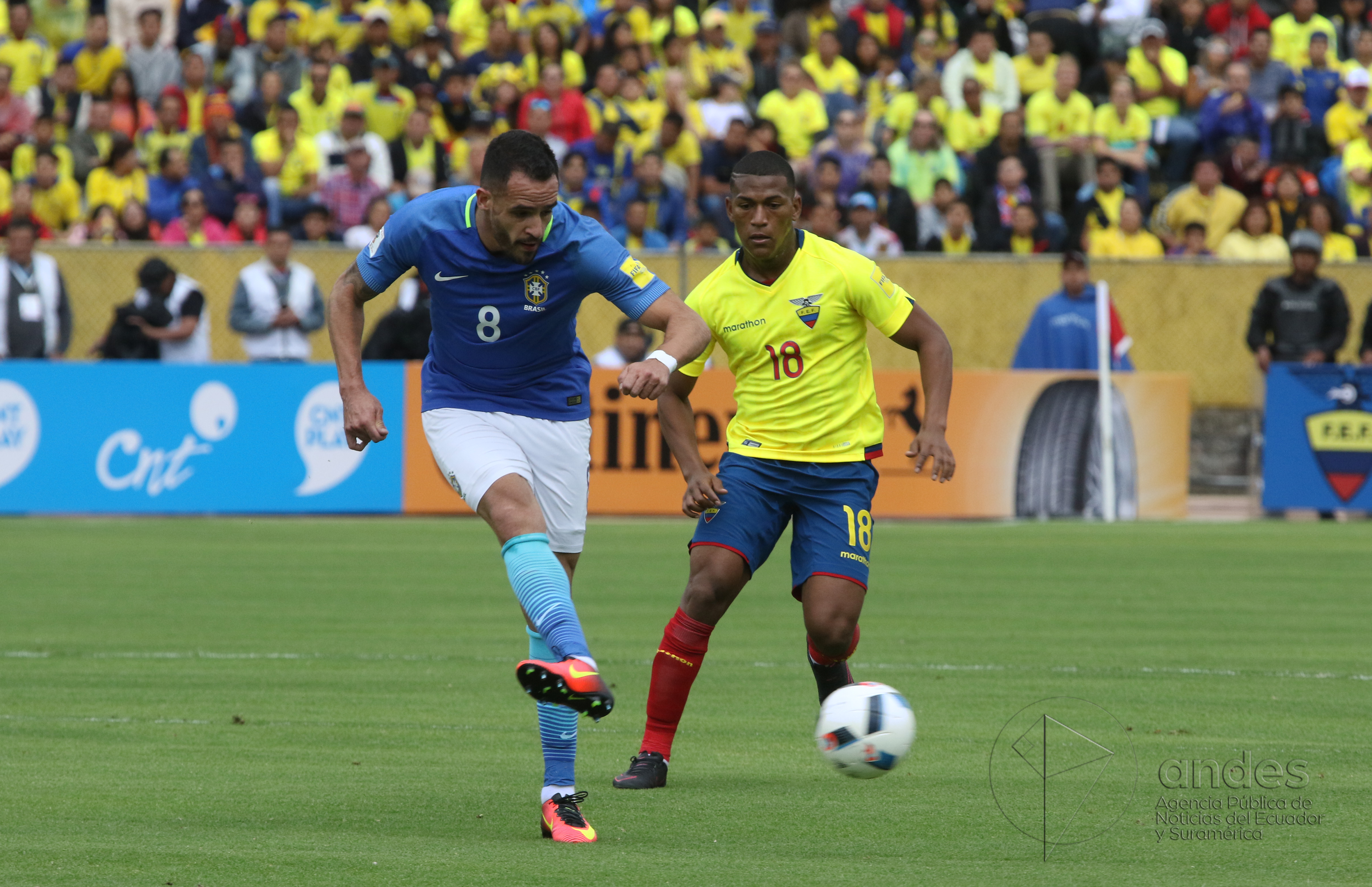
Renato Augusto playing for Brazil in 2016

Renato debuted with the senior national team in a away friendly against France in February 2011, which Brazil lost 0-1. His 2nd game was a March 2011 friendly against Scotland, which Brazil won 2–0. He was not called up by Mano Menezes for the 2011 Copa América, but returned to the squad for a friendly against Germany in August 2011, which Brazil lost 2–3. After that, he went more than four years without playing for Brazil, missing the 2013 Confederations Cup, the 2014 World Cup and the 2015 Copa América.

Previously, he was part of the preliminary squad for the 2008 Summer Olympics, but was not included in the final 18-man squad by coach Dunga, only getting named in the standby list. He was recalled by the same Dunga, who had returned to the job after the 2014 World Cup, for the 2018 FIFA World Cup qualifiers in November 2015.

On 17 November 2015, Augusto scored his first goal for Brazil in a 3–0 victory against Peru for 2018 FIFA World Cup qualification. He was a part of the Brazilian squads at the 2016 Copa América Centenario and the 2016 Olympic Games; in the latter, Brazil won the gold medal for the first time, and in the final against Germany after a 1–1 draw, he converted his penalty kick in an eventual 5–4 win for Brazil.

Renato netted twice against Haiti during the Copa América Centenario (7–1 win for Brazil), with Brazil eventually falling out in group stage. He also scored twice more during the qualifiers, at home to Uruguay (2–2) and away to Peru (2–0 win for Brazil).

In May 2018, he was named in Tite's final 23-man squad for the 2018 World Cup in Russia. On 6 July 2018, Augusto scored Brazil's only goal in a 1–2 quarter-final defeat to Belgium as they were eliminated from the World Cup.

In June 2019, he was considered by some fans and part of the media to be one of the top contenders to take Neymar's spot in the national team ahead of the 2019 Copa América, held in Brazilian soil, after the PSG forward got injured in a friendly against Qatar, due to his previous works with coach Tite in Corinthians and the national team itself, but eventually lost out the callup to Chelsea's Willian.

== Career statistics ==
Appearances and goals by club, season and competition
Club	Season	League			State league		National cup (Note: Includes Copa do Brasil, DFB-Pokal, Chinese FA Cup)		Continental		Other		Total	
Club	Season	Division	Apps	Goals	Apps	Goals	Apps	Goals	Apps	Goals	Apps	Goals	Apps	Goals
Flamengo	2005	Série A	2	0	—		—		—		—		2	0
Flamengo	2006	Série A	24	0	—		2	0	—		—		26	0
Flamengo	2007	Série A	24	2	13 (Note: Appearances in Campeonato Carioca)	3	—		8 (Note: Appearances in Copa Libertadores)	1	—		45	6
Flamengo	2008	Série A	6	0	8	1	—		3	1	—		17	2
Flamengo	Total		56	2	21	4	2	0	11	2	—		90	8
Bayer Leverkusen	2008–09	Bundesliga	33	2	—		6	2	—		—		39	4
Bayer Leverkusen	2009–10	Bundesliga	17	0	—		1	0	—		—		18	0
Bayer Leverkusen	2010–11	Bundesliga	27	7	—		1	1	7 (Note: Appearances in UEFA Europa League)	0	—		35	8
Bayer Leverkusen	2011–12	Bundesliga	18	0	—		1	0	4 (Note: Appearances in UEFA Champions League)	0	—		23	0
Bayer Leverkusen	2012–13	Bundesliga	6	0	—		—		5	0	—		11	0
Bayer Leverkusen	Total		101	9	—		9	3	16	0	—		126	12
Corinthians	2013	Série A	15	1	10 (Note: Appearances in Campeonato Paulista)	1	—		4	0	2 (Note: Appearances in Recopa Sudamericana)	1	31	3
Corinthians	2014	Série A	30	1	5	0	7	2	—		—		42	3
Corinthians	2015	Série A	30	5	7	2	2	0	10	0	—		49	7
Corinthians	Total		75	7	22	3	9	2	14	0	2	1	122	13
Beijing Guoan	2016	Chinese Super League	23	4	—		4	2	—		—		27	6
Beijing Guoan	2017	Chinese Super League	28	4	—		2	0	—		—		30	4
Beijing Guoan	2018	Chinese Super League	26	10	—		7	0	—		—		33	10
Beijing Guoan	2019	Chinese Super League	30	15	—		1	0	6 (Note: Appearances in AFC Champions League)	1	1 (Note: Appearances in Chinese FA Super Cup)	0	38	16
Beijing Guoan	2020	Chinese Super League	15	2	—		1	0	8	2	—		24	4
Beijing Guoan	Total		122	35	—		15	2	14	3	1	0	152	40
Corinthians	2021	Série A	21	4	—		—		—		—		21	4
Corinthians	2022	Série A	25	1	13	2	5	2	7	0	—		50	5
Corinthians	2023	Série A	24	2	10	1	4	3	7 (Note: Appearances in Copa Sudamericana)	0	—		45	6
Corinthians	Total		70	7	23	3	9	5	14	0	—		116	15
Fluminense	2024	Série A	17	1	8	0	2	0	4	0	1	0	32	1
Fluminense	2025	Série A	2	0	1	—		0	1	0	—		4	0
Fluminense	Total		19	1	9	0	2	0	5	0	1	0	36	1
Career total			443	61	76	10	46	12	74	5	4	1	642	89

=== International ===
Appearances and goals by national team and year
National team	Year	Apps	Goals
Brazil	2011	3	0
Brazil	2012	0	0
Brazil	2013	0	0
Brazil	2014	0	0
Brazil	2015	2	1
Brazil	2016	12	4
Brazil	2017	10	0
Brazil	2018	5	1
Total		32	6

Scores and results list Brazil's goal tally first, score column indicates score after each Augusto goal.

List of international goals scored by Renato Augusto
No.	Date	Venue	Opponent	Score	Result	Competition
1	17 November 2015	Itaipava Arena Fonte Nova, Salvador, Brazil	Peru	2–0	3–0	2018 FIFA World Cup qualification
2	25 March 2016	Itaipava Arena Pernambuco, Recife, Brazil	Uruguay	2–0	2–2	2018 FIFA World Cup qualification
3	8 June 2016	Camping World Stadium, Orlando, United States	Haiti	3–0	7–1	Copa América Centenario
4	8 June 2016	Camping World Stadium, Orlando, United States	Haiti	6–1	7–1	Copa América Centenario
5	15 November 2016	Estadio Nacional de Lima, Lima, Peru	Peru	2–0	2–0	2018 FIFA World Cup qualification
6	6 July 2018	Kazan Arena, Kazan, Russia	Belgium	1–2	1–2	2018 FIFA World Cup

== Honours ==
Flamengo

- Copa do Brasil: 2006
- Campeonato Carioca: 2007, 2008

Corinthians

- Campeonato Brasileiro Série A: 2015
- Campeonato Paulista: 2013
- Recopa Sudamericana: 2013

Beijing Guoan

- Chinese FA Cup: 2018

Fluminense

- Recopa Sudamericana: 2024

Brazil U17

- FIFA U-17 World Cup runner-up: 2005

Brazil U23

- Olympic Gold Medal: 2016

Individual

- kicker Bundesliga Team of the Season: 2008–09
- Campeonato Brasileiro Série A Best Player: 2015
- Campeonato Brasileiro Série A Team of the Year: 2015
- Bola de Ouro: 2015
- Troféu Mesa Redonda Best Player: 2015
- Best Central Midfielder in Brazil: 2015
- Campeonato Paulista Team of the Year: 2023
