= Yu Dabao =

Chinese footballer

Yu Dabao 于大宝
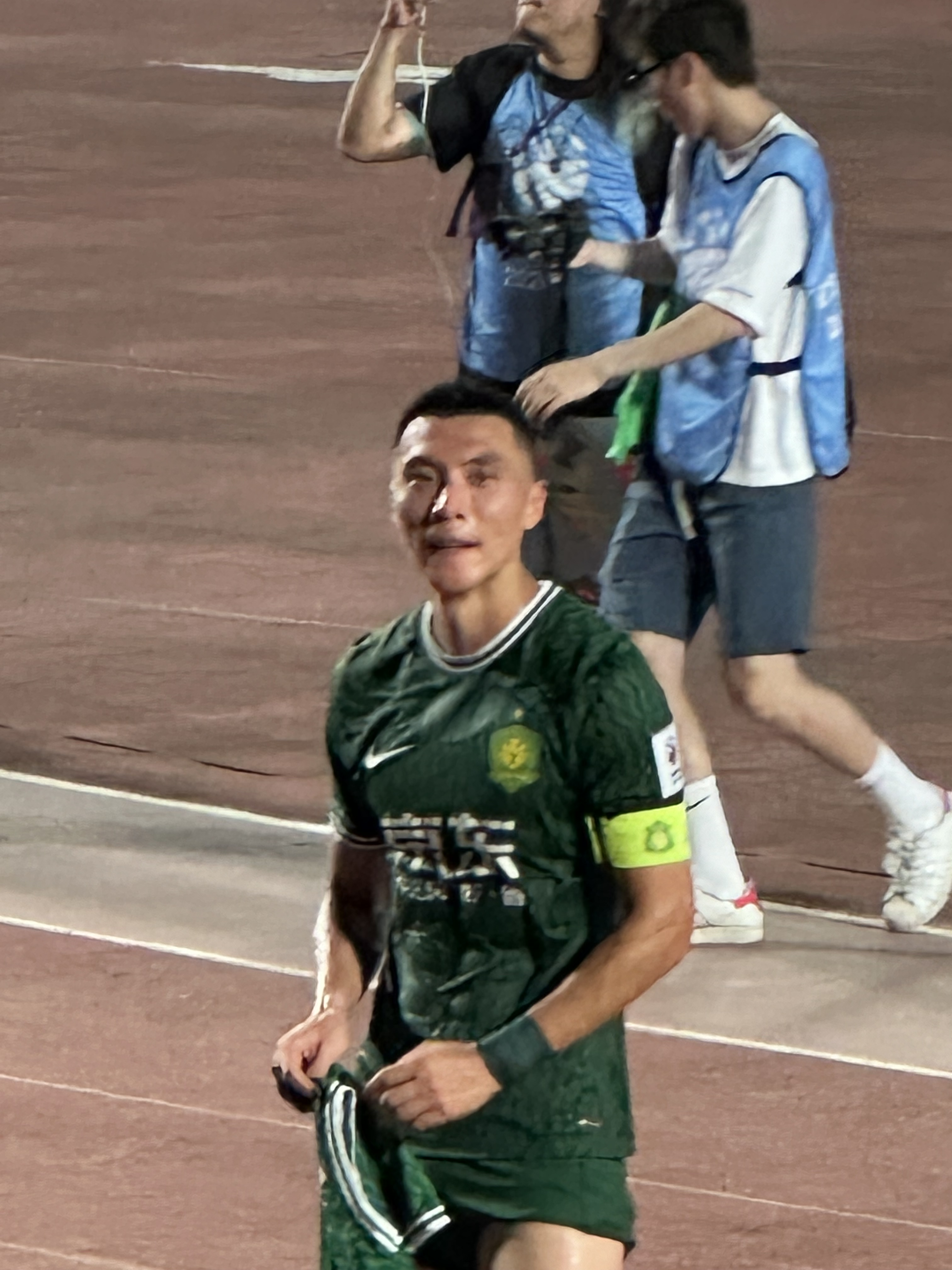
- Yu Dabao in July 2024

Personal information
- Full name: Yu Dabao
- Date of birth: 18 April 1988 (age 38)
- Place of birth: Qingdao, Shandong, China
- Height: 1.83 m (6 ft 0 in)
- Positions: Striker; centre-back

Team information
- Current team: Beijing Guoan U17 (head coach)

Youth career
- 1997–2000: Qingdao Etsong Hainiu
- 2001: Guangdong Mingfeng
- 2002–2003: Qingdao Hailifeng
- 2006–2007: Benfica

Senior career*
Years	Team	Apps	(Gls)
2004–2006	Qingdao Hailifeng	28	(7)
2007–2009	Benfica	0	(0)
2007	→ Aves (loan)	9	(1)
2008	→ Olivais Moscavide (loan)	12	(2)
2009	→ Mafra (loan)	12	(3)
2010–2011	Tianjin Teda	47	(12)
2012–2014	Dalian Aerbin	84	(17)
2015–2024	Beijing Guoan	192	(22)
Total		384	(63)

International career
2004–2006	China U17		
2007–2008	China U20		
2010–2022	China	65	(19)

Managerial career
- 2025–: Beijing Guoan U17
- 2025–: China U22 (trainer)
Medal record
Representing China
Men's football
EAFF Championship
Silver medal – second place	2013 South Korea	Team
Silver medal – second place	2015 China	Team
Bronze medal – third place	2017 Japan	Team
Bronze medal – third place	2019 South Korea	Team
AFC U-17 Championship
Gold medal – first place	2004 Japan	Team
- * Club domestic league appearances and goals

Yu Dabao
- Simplified Chinese: 于大宝
- Traditional Chinese: 于大寶
Transcriptions
Standard Mandarin
- Hanyu Pinyin: Yú Dàbǎo
- IPA: [y̌ tâ pàʊ]

Yu Dabao (Chinese: 于大宝; pinyin: Yú Dàbǎo; born 18 April 1988) is a Chinese football coach and former professional footballer who played as a centre-back and striker, and is currently the head coach of the Beijing Guoan U17s.

== Early life ==
Yu was born in a footballing family in Qingdao. Under the influence of his father and grandfather, he began playing football when he was 6. While he was a good student in school, he decided to become a professional footballer and began training full-time at 14.

== Club career ==
Yu Dabao started his football career playing for second-tier side Qingdao Hailifeng and was soon called up to the Chinese under-17 national team. With the under-17 side, he played well during the 2004 AFC U-17 Championship and was quickly regarded as one of the best prospects in China due to his aerial and counterattacking abilities. His breakout season was in 2006, where he scored 8 goals across 20 matches in all competitions. His first professional goal came on 16 March 2006, when Qingdao Hailifeng played against Chengdu Blades at home. His goal was what separated the two teams in a 1–0 win for Qingdao.

This saw many clubs reportedly interested in the Yu including Ajax, Newcastle United, and Rangers; however, he joined Benfica on a three-year deal. In his debut match, only five days and three training sessions after he arrived in Portugal, Yu scored three goals and assisted a fourth in a reserve match against Portimonense.

Due to Yu's strong performances for Benfica's reserves, he was given the chance of training with the first team during preseason and was thus officially added to the first team. He made his debut for the club on 26 September 2007 in a 0–0 draw against Estrela da Amadora in the Taça da Liga, winning 5-4 on penalties. He was then soon loaned out to second-tier side C.D. Aves and then third-tier side Olivais Moscavide but was unable to save them from relegation as they suffered defeat in the last match of the season. Speculation then grew that Yu was willing to leave Benfica after his loan period at C.D. Mafra ended. By 13 May 2009, Yu revealed in a telephone interview that he was about to leave to spend the offseason back in his homeland; however, he received a call from Benfica asking him to stay until further notice.

By February 2010, Yu's contract with Benfica had ended and he went on trial with Major League Soccer side FC Dallas; however, he was unable to receive a contract with them. He then signed a contract with Chinese Super League side Tianjin Teda before the start of the 2010 season. His move turned out to be a big success and he went on to win the 2011 Chinese FA Cup, which saw him become one of the most sought-after players in China. On 27 February 2012, it was reported that Yu transferred to reigning league champions Guangzhou Evergrande for a reported fee of ¥15 million; however, Guangzhou withdrew from the transfer talk in the afternoon that day and he transferred to the newly promoted side Dalian Aerbin the next day.

=== Beijing Guoan ===
On 27 December 2014, Yu transferred to fellow Chinese Super League side Beijing Guoan after Dalian was relegated at the end of the 2014 season. Yu's first goal for Guoan came on 17 March 2015, in an AFC Champions League match against Japanses club Urawa Red Diamonds. He scored Guoan's second goal to secure the team's 2–0 victory.

By the 2018 league season, coach Roger Schmidt would name Yu as the club's captain and convert him into a centre-back. This change in position would see Yu lead Beijing to go on to win the 2018 Chinese FA Cup.

On 31 December 2024, Yu's retirement from professional football was announced by Guoan. Following his retirement, he transitioned to coaching the youth ranks of the club, starting with the U17 squad. In his 10 seasons for Guoan, he played in 229 matches, scored 27 goals and assisted another 21.

The club held a retirement ceremony for Yu at the Workers' Stadium on 29 March 2025, ahead of Guoan's first home game in the 2025 season.

== International career ==
Yu was called up to the Chinese national team by then manager Gao Hongbo and made his debut on 18 December 2010 in a 3–0 win against Estonia. After making several further appearances, he scored his first goal for China on 22 February 2012 in a 2–0 unofficial friendly win against Kuwait. Yu did not have to wait long before he scored his first official goal when he scored on 29 February 2012 in a 3–1 win against Jordan during 2014 FIFA World Cup qualification.

Yu's most extraordinary goal occurred during the Third Round of AFC's 2018 World Cup Qualifying in a match against South Korea. Yu's header in the 34th minute and a stirring second-half performance by goalkeeper Zeng Cheng saw Marcello Lippi's side claim a 1–0 win over South Korea, which was only China's second win against South Korea in 32 games.

Yu announced his retirement from international competition in 2022 via social media.

== Career statistics ==
=== Club ===
Appearances and goals by club, season and competition
Club	Season	League			National Cup		League Cup		Continental		Other		Total	
Club	Season	Division	Apps	Goals	Apps	Goals	Apps	Goals	Apps	Goals	Apps	Goals	Apps	Goals
Qingdao Hailifeng	2004	China League One	8	0	0	0	-		-		-		8	0
Qingdao Hailifeng	2005	China League One	2	0	0	0	-		-		-		2	0
Qingdao Hailifeng	2006	China League One	18	7	2	1	-		-		-		20	8
Qingdao Hailifeng	Total		28	7	2	1	0	0	0	0	0	0	30	8
Benfica	2007–08	Primeira Liga	0	0	0	0	3	0	0	0	-		3	0
Aves (loan)	2007–08	Liga de Honra	9	1	0	0	0	0	-		-		9	1
Moscavide (loan)	2008–09	Segunda Divisão	12	2	0	0	0	0	-		-		12	2
Mafra (loan)	2009–10	Segunda Divisão	12	3	3	0	0	0	-		-		15	3
Tianjin Teda	2010	Chinese Super League	22	6	-		-		-		-		22	6
Tianjin Teda	2011	Chinese Super League	25	6	2	1	-		6	1	-		33	8
Tianjin Teda	Total		47	12	2	1	0	0	6	1	0	0	55	14
Dalian Aerbin	2012	Chinese Super League	27	6	0	0	-		-		-		27	6
Dalian Aerbin	2013	Chinese Super League	29	8	4	1	-		-		-		33	9
Dalian Aerbin	2014	Chinese Super League	28	3	0	0	-		-		-		28	3
Dalian Aerbin	Total		84	17	4	1	0	0	0	0	0	0	88	18
Beijing Guoan	2015	Chinese Super League	29	5	2	0	-		8	2	-		39	7
Beijing Guoan	2016	Chinese Super League	22	4	4	1	-		-		-		26	5
Beijing Guoan	2017	Chinese Super League	12	1	1	1	-		-		-		13	2
Beijing Guoan	2018	Chinese Super League	21	2	6	0	-		-		-		27	2
Beijing Guoan	2019	Chinese Super League	25	4	1	0	-		6	0	1 (Note: Appearance in Chinese FA Super Cup)	0	33	4
Beijing Guoan	2020	Chinese Super League	11	0	0	0	-		4	0	-		15	0
Beijing Guoan	2021	Chinese Super League	15	1	0	0	-		0	0	-		15	1
Beijing Guoan	2022	Chinese Super League	25	3	0	0	-		-		-		25	3
Beijing Guoan	2023	Chinese Super League	18	0	2	0	-		-		-		20	0
Beijing Guoan	2024	Chinese Super League	14	2	2	1	-		-		-		16	3
Beijing Guoan	Total		192	22	18	3	0	0	18	2	1	0	229	27
Career total			384	63	29	6	3	0	24	3	1	0	441	73

=== International ===
Appearances and goals by national team and year

National team
Year	Apps	Goals
2010	1	0
2011	4	0
2012	4	1
2013	14	4
2014	1	0
2015	11	9
2016	3	0
2017	7	3
2018	6	0
2019	9	2
2020	0	0
2021	3	0
2022	2	0
Total	65	19

=== International goals ===
==== List of international goals scored by Yu Dabao ====
China score listed first, score column indicates score after each Yu Dabao goal

No	Date	Venue	Opponent	Score	Result	Competition
-	22 February 2012	Helong Stadium, Changsha, China	Kuwait	2–0	2–0	Friendly^{1}
1.	29 February 2012	Guangzhou University City Stadium, Guangzhou, China	Jordan	3–1	3–1	2014 FIFA World Cup qualification
2.	22 March 2013	Helong Stadium, Changsha, China	Iraq	1–0	1–0	2015 AFC Asian Cup qualification
3.	28 July 2013	Olympic Stadium, Songpa-gu, South Korea	Australia	1–0	4–3	2013 EAFF East Asian Cup
4.	6 September 2013	Olympic Stadium, Tianjin, China	Singapore	1–0	6–1	Friendly
5.	6 September 2013	Olympic Stadium, Tianjin, China	Singapore	2–1	6–1	Friendly
6.	27 March 2015	Helong Stadium, Changsha, China	Haiti	2–2	2–2	Friendly
7.	31 March 2015	Nanjing Olympic Sports Centre, Nanjing, China	Tunisia	1–1	1–1	Friendly
8.	16 June 2015	Changlimithang Stadium, Thimphu, Bhutan	Bhutan	4–0	6–0	2018 FIFA World Cup qualification
9.	16 June 2015	Changlimithang Stadium, Thimphu, Bhutan	Bhutan	6–0	6–0	2018 FIFA World Cup qualification
10.	5 August 2015	Wuhan Sports Center Stadium, Wuhan, China	North Korea	1–0	2–0	2015 EAFF East Asian Cup
11.	16 June 2015	Shenyang Olympic Sports Center Stadium, Shenyang, China	Maldives	1–0	3–0	2018 FIFA World Cup qualification
12.	16 June 2015	Shenyang Olympic Sports Center Stadium, Shenyang, China	Maldives	2–0	3–0	2018 FIFA World Cup qualification
13.	12 November 2015	Helong Stadium, Changsha, China	Bhutan	3–0	12–0	2018 FIFA World Cup qualification
14.	12 November 2015	Helong Stadium, Changsha, China	Bhutan	7–0	12–0	2018 FIFA World Cup qualification
15.	23 March 2017	Helong Stadium, Changsha, China	South Korea	1–0	1–0	2018 FIFA World Cup qualification
16.	9 December 2017	Ajinomoto Stadium, Tokyo, Japan	South Korea	2–2	2–2	2017 EAFF E-1 Football Championship
17.	12 December 2017	Ajinomoto Stadium, Tokyo, Japan	Japan	1–2	1–2	2017 EAFF E-1 Football Championship
18.	7 January 2019	Khalifa bin Zayed Stadium, Al Ain, United Arab Emirates	Kyrgyzstan	2–1	2–1	2019 AFC Asian Cup
19.	11 January 2019	Mohammed bin Zayed Stadium, Abu Dhabi, United Arab Emirates	Philippines	3–0	3–0	2019 AFC Asian Cup
1:Non FIFA 'A' international match

== Honours ==
Tianjin Teda

- Chinese FA Cup: 2011

Beijing Guoan

- Chinese FA Cup: 2018

China U-17

- AFC U-17 Championship: 2004
