= Li Lei (footballer) =

Chinese footballer

Li Lei 李磊
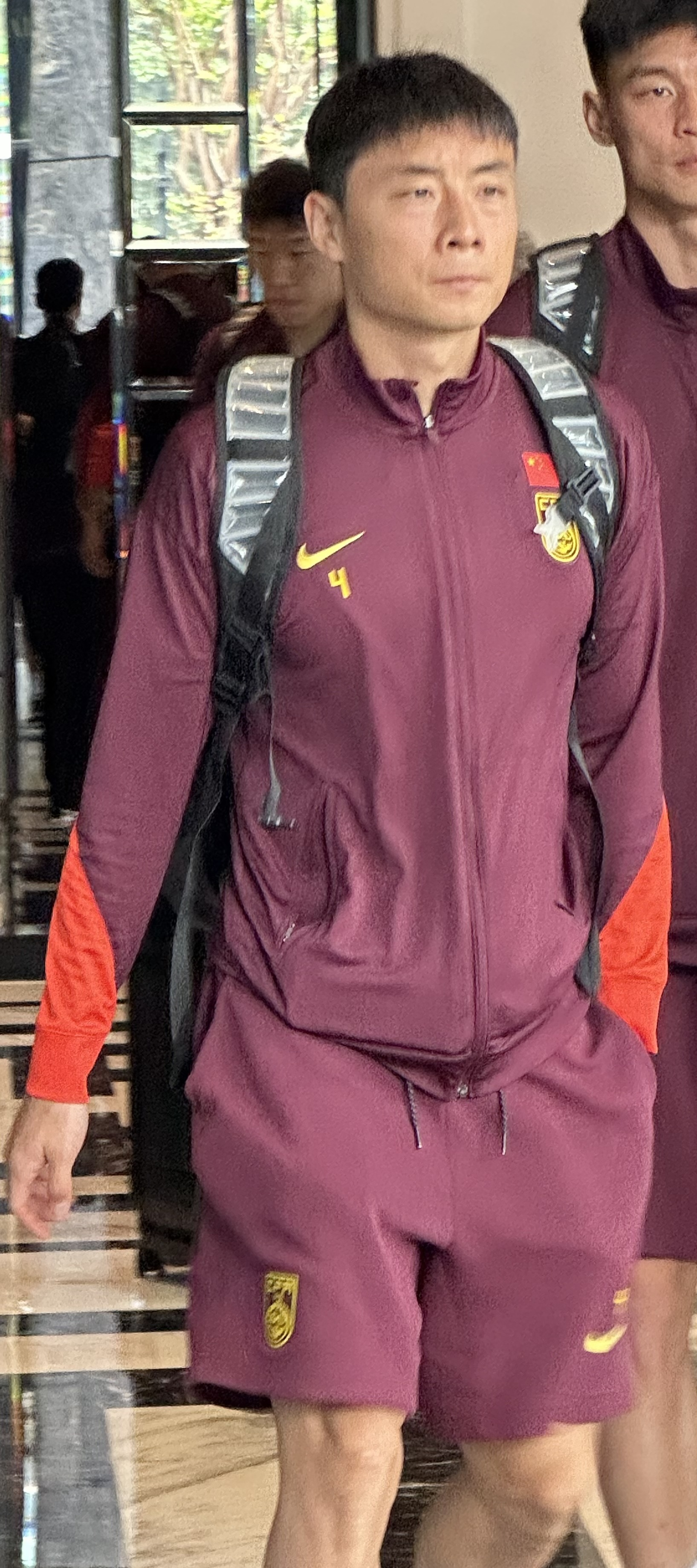
- Li Lei in June 2025

Personal information
- Date of birth: 30 May 1992 (age 34)
- Place of birth: Qingdao, Shandong, China
- Height: 1.83 m (6 ft 0 in)
- Position: Left-back

Team information
- Current team: Beijing Guoan
- Number: 4

Youth career
- 2003–2009: Qingdao Hailifeng

Senior career*
Years	Team	Apps	(Gls)
2010–2012	Shanghai Shenxin	44	(3)
2013–2014	Henan Jianye	38	(3)
2015–2021	Beijing Guoan	115	(4)
2022–2023	Grasshoppers	13	(0)
2023–	Beijing Guoan	78	(2)

International career^{‡}
	China U22	6	(1)
2019–	China	20	(0)
- * Club domestic league appearances and goals as of 19 November 2026 ‡ National team caps and goals as of 14 November 2024

Li Lei (Chinese: 李磊; pinyin: Lǐ Lěi; Mandarin pronunciation: [lì lèɪ]; born 30 May 1992) is a Chinese professional footballer who currently plays as a left-back for Chinese Super League club Beijing Guoan and the China national team.

== Club career ==
Li Lei spent his youth career at his hometown team Qingdao Hailifeng and would go on to establish himself as left midfielder before recently promoted side Nanchang Hengyuan became interested in him at the end of the 2009 league season where they would promote him to the senior side.

He made his professional football league debut at the age of seventeen on April 17, 2010 against Hangzhou Greentown, however he received a straight red card just ten minutes into his career after fouling Hangzhou player Sun Ji. Despite this setback once his suspension ended he was immediately brought back into the senior side and start the next possible game on May 9, 2010 against Shaanxi Zhongjian. He scored his first goal for Shanghai Shenxin in a 2-0 win against Jiangsu Sainty on the 31st October 2010.

=== Henan Jianye ===
Li transferred to Henan Jianye on 16 February 2013. He won the 2013 China League One title with Henan in his first season and promoted back to the Chinese Super League after a one-year absence.

=== Beijing Guoan ===
On 18 January 2015, Li made a move to fellow Chinese Super League side Beijing Guoan. On 17 March 2015, Li made his debut for Guoan in a 2-0 home win against Urawa Red Diamonds in the 2015 AFC Champions League group stage. He scored his first goal for Beijing on 21 April 2017 in a 1–1 home draw against Tianjin Quanjian. On 30 November 2018, he won the 2018 Chinese FA Cup with Guoan after a 2-2 away draw (aggregated 3-3 draw, Guoan won on away goals) against Shandong Luneng, his first trophy with the club and the club's first major trophy in 9 years.

=== Grasshoppers ===
On 20 December 2021, Li signed with Grasshoppers in Switzerland. On 5 February 2022, he made his Swiss Super League debut in a 3-1 home defeat against FC Zürich.

On 28 February 2023, Li terminated his contract with Grasshoppers, despite only having a few more months left of his contract. In his 14 appearances, 13 in the league and one in the cup, he supplied one assist.

=== Return to Guoan ===
On 30 March 2023, Li returned to Chinese Super League club Beijing Guoan.

== International career ==
On 21 March 2019, Li made his debut for the Chinese national team in a 1–0 loss against Thailand in the 2019 China Cup.

On 12 December 2023, Li was named in China's squad for the 2023 AFC Asian Cup in Qatar.

On 15 December 2025, Li scored his first international goal in a friendly match between Chinese national team and Kuwait national team

== Career statistics ==
=== Club statistics ===
As of 2 November 2024

Appearances and goals by club, season and competition
Club	Season	League			National cup (Note: Includes Chinese FA Cup, Swiss Cup)		Continental		Other		Total	
Club	Season	Division	Apps	Goals	Apps	Goals	Apps	Goals	Apps	Goals	Apps	Goals
Shanghai Shenxin	2010	Chinese Super League	20	2	–		–		–		20	2
Shanghai Shenxin	2011	Chinese Super League	12	1	2	0	–		–		14	1
Shanghai Shenxin	2012	Chinese Super League	12	0	0	0	–		–		12	0
Shanghai Shenxin	Total		44	3	2	0	–		–		46	3
Henan Jianye	2013	China League One	26	3	1	0	–		–		27	3
Henan Jianye	2014	Chinese Super League	12	0	0	0	–		–		12	0
Henan Jianye	Total		38	3	1	0	–		–		39	3
Beijing Guoan	2015	Chinese Super League	10	0	2	0	3 (Note: Appearances in AFC Champions League)	0	–		15	0
Beijing Guoan	2016	Chinese Super League	14	0	1	0	–		–		15	0
Beijing Guoan	2017	Chinese Super League	28	2	2	0	–		–		30	2
Beijing Guoan	2018	Chinese Super League	9	0	4	0	–		–		13	0
Beijing Guoan	2019	Chinese Super League	18	0	1	0	5	0	1 (Note: Appearance in Chinese FA Super Cup)	0	25	0
Beijing Guoan	2020	Chinese Super League	17	1	0	0	7	0	–		24	1
Beijing Guoan	2021	Chinese Super League	19	1	0	0	0	0	–		19	1
Beijing Guoan	Total		115	4	10	0	15	0	1	0	141	4
Grasshoppers	2021–22	Swiss Super League	7	0	0	0	–		–		7	0
Grasshoppers	2022–23	Swiss Super League	6	0	1	0	–		–		7	0
Grasshoppers	Total		13	0	1	0	–		–		14	0
Beijing Guoan	2023	Chinese Super League	21	0	2	0	–		–		23	0
Beijing Guoan	2024	Chinese Super League	25	1	3	0	–		–		28	1
Beijing Guoan	Total		46	1	5	0	–		–		51	1
Career total			256	11	19	0	15	0	1	0	293	11

=== International statistics ===
Appearances and goals by national team and year
National team	Year	Apps	Goals
China
China	2019	4	0
China	2020	0	0
China	2021	1	0
China	2023	6	0
China	2024	6	0
China	2025	3	0
Total		20	0

== Honours ==
Henan Jianye

- China League One: 2013

Beijing Guoan

- Chinese FA Cup: 2018, 2025
- Chinese FA Super Cup: 2026

Individual

- Chinese Super League Team of the Year: 2024
