= Hou Sen =

Chinese footballer

Hou Sen 侯森
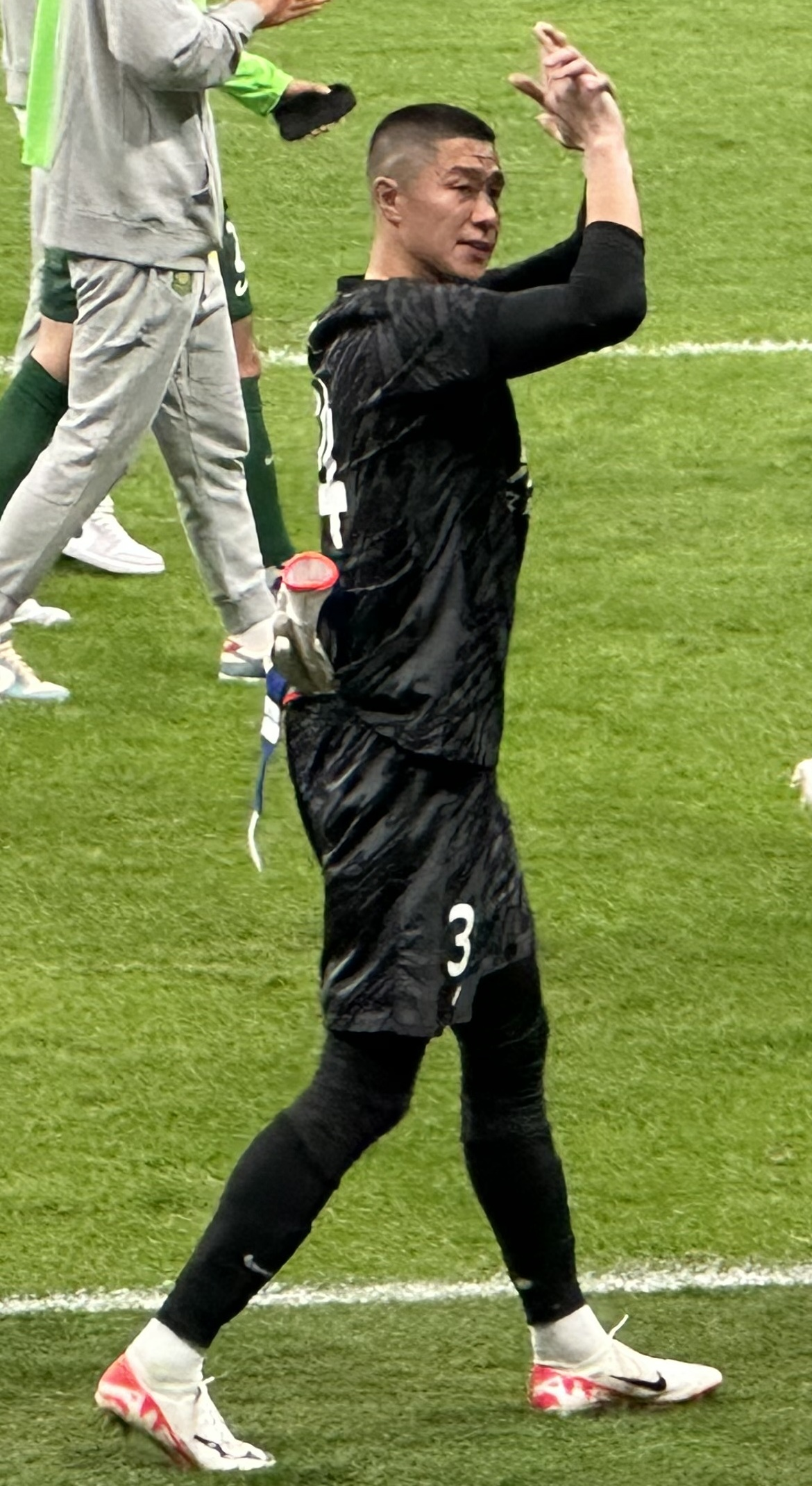
- Hou Sen in May 2025

Personal information
- Full name: Hou Sen
- Date of birth: 30 June 1989 (age 37)
- Place of birth: Beijing, China
- Height: 1.88 m (6 ft 2 in)
- Position: Goalkeeper

Team information
- Current team: Beijing Guoan
- Number: 34

Youth career
- Beijing Guoan

Senior career*
Years	Team	Apps	(Gls)
2009–	Beijing Guoan	169	(0)
- * Club domestic league appearances and goals as of 19 November 2026

Hou Sen (Chinese: 侯森; pinyin: Hóu Sēn; born June 30, 1989) is a Chinese professional footballer who plays as a goalkeeper for Chinese Super League club Beijing Guoan.

== Club career ==
Hou started his football career in 2009 when he was promoted to Beijing Guoan's first team squad. He played as a back-up goalkeeper for Yang Zhi and Zhang Sipeng. He became the first-choice goalkeeper of Beijing Guoan in the beginning of 2012 season as Yang Zhi injured in the 2012 Guangdong–Hong Kong Cup. On 6 March 2012, he made his senior debut in the first round of 2012 AFC Champions League group stage which Beijing Guoan lost to Ulsan Hyundai 2–1. Four days later, he made his Chinese Super League debut in a 3-1 away defeat against newly promoted Guangzhou R&F. On 8 April 2012, he kept his first clean sheet in a 0-0 away draw at Dalian Shide. Hou returned to the bench after Yang Zhi recovered from injury in July.

Under the Head coach Roger Schmidt, Hou would re-emerge and fight for the first-choice goalkeeper position with Guo Quanbo. He would go on to be in the starting line-up against Shandong Luneng Taishan as he won his first piece of silverware, with the 2018 Chinese FA Cup. While Zou Dehai was brought in the following season as the clubs first choice goalkeeper, Hou would once again establish himself as an integral member of the team and on 29 October 2022, Hou made his 100th appearance for Guoan in a 4-1 win against Guangzhou F.C.

== Career statistics ==
Statistics accurate as of match played 15 June 2024.

Appearances and goals by club, season and competition
Club	Season	League			National Cup		Continental		Other		Total	
Club	Season	Division	Apps	Goals	Apps	Goals	Apps	Goals	Apps	Goals	Apps	Goals
Beijing Guoan	2009	Chinese Super League	0	0	-		0	0	-		0	0
Beijing Guoan	2010	Chinese Super League	0	0	-		0	0	-		0	0
Beijing Guoan	2011	Chinese Super League	0	0	0	0	-		-		0	0
Beijing Guoan	2012	Chinese Super League	18	0	0	0	4	0	-		22	0
Beijing Guoan	2013	Chinese Super League	1	0	0	0	0	0	-		1	0
Beijing Guoan	2014	Chinese Super League	0	0	0	0	0	0	-		0	0
Beijing Guoan	2015	Chinese Super League	0	0	0	0	2	0	-		2	0
Beijing Guoan	2016	Chinese Super League	1	0	0	0	-		-		1	0
Beijing Guoan	2017	Chinese Super League	2	0	0	0	-		-		2	0
Beijing Guoan	2018	Chinese Super League	13	0	4	0	-		-		17	0
Beijing Guoan	2019	Chinese Super League	1	0	0	0	0	0	-		1	0
Beijing Guoan	2020	Chinese Super League	11	0	0	0	7	0	-		18	0
Beijing Guoan	2021	Chinese Super League	22	0	1	0	0	0	-		23	0
Beijing Guoan	2022	Chinese Super League	22	0	0	0	-		-		22	0
Beijing Guoan	2023	Chinese Super League	11	0	3	0	-		-		14	0
Beijing Guoan	2024	Chinese Super League	15	0	0	0	-		-		15	0
Beijing Guoan	Total		117	0	8	0	13	0	0	0	138	0
Career total			117	0	8	0	13	0	0	0	138	0

== Honours ==
=== Club ===
Beijing Guoan

- Chinese FA Cup: 2018, 2025
- Chinese FA Super Cup: 2026
