= Zhao Hejing =

Chinese footballer

Zhao Hejing 赵和靖
Personal information
- Full name: Zhao Hejing
- Date of birth: 19 May 1985 (age 41)
- Place of birth: Chongqing, Sichuan, China
- Height: 1.85 m (6 ft 1 in)
- Positions: Full-back; centre-back

Senior career*
Years	Team	Apps	(Gls)
2005–2010	Chongqing Lifan	122	(3)
2011–2013	Dalian Aerbin	77	(2)
2014–2017	Beijing Guoan	90	(1)
2018–2021	Guizhou	79	(1)
2022–2024	Chongqing Tonglianglong	54	(4)
Total		422	(11)
- * Club domestic league appearances and goals

Zhao Hejing (Chinese: 赵和靖; pinyin: Zhào Héjìng; Mandarin pronunciation: [ʈʂâʊ xɤ̌ tɕîŋ]; born 19 May 1985) is a Chinese former footballer who played as full-back.

== Club career ==
=== Chongqing Lifan ===
Zhao Hejing started his football career with top tier side Chongqing Lifan and would make his league debut for the team on 3 July 2005 against Sichuan Guancheng where he conceded a penalty that led his club losing 2-1. Despite the defeat, Zhao would gradually establish himself as a regular; however, by the end of the 2006 season, he was part of the team that was relegated. He remained faithful towards the team and would be a vital player as the club won promotion back into the top tier at the end of the 2008 season. His return to the top tier often saw the club struggle within the league and Chongqing were once again relegated at the end of the 2010 season.

=== Dalian Aerbin ===
Before the 2011 season, Zhao would transfer to second tier side Dalian Aerbin for 2 million yuan. At his new club, he would immediately establish himself as a vital member of the team and by the end of the season go on to win the division title and promotion to the top flight.

=== Beijing Guoan ===
On 3 January 2014, Zhao transferred to fellow Chinese Super League side Beijing Guoan on a free transfer. He made his debut for the club on 15 March 2014 in a 1–0 win against Dalian Aerbin.

=== Guizhou Hengfeng ===
On 11 December 2017, Zhao transferred to fellow Chinese Super League side Guizhou Hengfeng.

=== Chongqing Tonglianglong ===
Zhao returned to his hometown Chongqing and signed for then-amateur CMCL club Chongqing Tonglianglong in 2022. He achieved promotion twice in his first two seasons with the team, seeing the team move from CMCL to China League One, the second tier of Chinese football. He retired after the 2024 season.

== Career statistics ==
Appearances and goals by club, season and competition
Club	Season	League			National Cup		League Cup		Continental		Total	
Club	Season	Division	Apps	Goals	Apps	Goals	Apps	Goals	Apps	Goals	Apps	Goals
Chongqing Lifan	2005	Chinese Super League	7	0	0	0	0	0	–		7	0
Chongqing Lifan	2006	Chinese Super League	19	0	0	0	–		–		19	0
Chongqing Lifan	2007	China League One	21	1	-		–		–		21	1
Chongqing Lifan	2008	China League One	23	1	-		–		–		23	1
Chongqing Lifan	2009	Chinese Super League	25	0	-		–		–		25	0
Chongqing Lifan	2010	Chinese Super League	27	1	-		–		–		27	1
Chongqing Lifan	Total		122	3	0	0	0	0	0	0	122	3
Dalian Aerbin	2011	China League One	25	0	2	0	–		–		27	0
Dalian Aerbin	2012	Chinese Super League	25	0	0	0	–		–		25	0
Dalian Aerbin	2013	Chinese Super League	27	2	3	0	–		–		30	2
Dalian Aerbin	Total		77	2	5	0	0	0	0	0	82	2
Beijing Guoan	2014	Chinese Super League	25	0	2	0	–		5	0	32	0
Beijing Guoan	2015	Chinese Super League	25	0	1	0	–		9	0	35	0
Beijing Guoan	2016	Chinese Super League	26	1	2	0	–		–		28	1
Beijing Guoan	2017	Chinese Super League	14	0	2	0	–		–		16	0
Beijing Guoan	Total		90	1	7	0	0	0	14	0	111	1
Guizhou Hengfeng	2018	Chinese Super League	15	0	0	0	–		–		15	0
Guizhou Hengfeng	2019	China League One	30	1	0	0	–		–		30	1
Guizhou Hengfeng	2020	China League One	10	0	1	0	–		–		11	0
Guizhou Hengfeng	2021	China League One	24	0	0	0	–		–		24	0
Guizhou Hengfeng	Total		79	1	1	0	0	0	0	0	80	1
Chongqing Tonglianglong	2022	CMCL	9	0	–		–		–		9	0
Chongqing Tonglianglong	2023	China League Two	19	2	4	0	–		–		23	2
Chongqing Tonglianglong	2024	China League One	26	2	1	0	–		–		27	2
Chongqing Tonglianglong	Total		54	4	5	0	0	0	0	0	59	4
Career total			422	11	18	0	0	0	14	0	454	11

== Honours ==
=== Club ===
Dalian Aerbin

- China League One: 2011

Chongqing Tonglianglong

- China League Two: 2023
