= Shan Huanhuan =

Chinese footballer

Shan Huanhuan 单欢欢
Personal information
- Date of birth: 24 January 1999 (age 27)
- Place of birth: Pingdingshan, Henan, China
- Height: 1.85 m (6 ft 1 in)
- Position: Forward

Team information
- Current team: Hubei Istar
- Number: 9

Youth career
- Beijing Guoan
- 2017–2018: Vitória Guimarães

Senior career*
| Years | Team | Apps | (Gls) |
| 2016 | Beijing Guoan | 2 | (0) |
| 2018–2019 | Vitória Guimarães B | 4 | (0) |
| 2019–2023 | Dalian Pro | 21 | (2) |
| 2025 | Qingdao West Coast | 2 | (0) |
| 2026– | Hubei Istar | 0 | (0) |

International career^{‡}
| 2015–2016 | China U19 | 9 | (1) |
| 2019–2022 | China U23 | 3 | (1) |
- * Club domestic league appearances and goals as of 26 August 2025 ‡ National team caps and goals as of 22 March 2019

Shan Huanhuan (simplified Chinese: 单欢欢; traditional Chinese: 單歡歡; pinyin: Shàn Huānhuān; born 24 January 1999) is a Chinese professional footballer who plays as a forward for China League Two club Hubei Istar.

== Club career ==
Shan Huanhuan started his professional football career in 2016 when he was promoted to Chinese Super League side Beijing Guoan's first team squad by Alberto Zaccheroni. On 9 April 2016, Shan made his debut in a 3–0 home defeat against Guangzhou Evergrande, coming on for Zhao Hejing in the 46th minute, which made him the first player to be born in and beyond 1999 to make an appearance in the Chinese Super League. He refused to extend his contract and left Beijing Guoan at the end of 2016 season.

Shan joined Portuguese side Vitória Guimarães's U19 team in September 2017. He was promoted to the B team of LigaPro in the summer of 2018. On 12 August 2018, he made his debut for the club in a 1–0 home defeat against Cova da Piedade.

On 30 July 2019, Shan returned to China and signed with top tier club Dalian Pro. The following season he would be promoted to the senior team, however it wasn't until the 2021 Chinese Super League when he made his debut in a league game on 22 April 2021 against Changchun Yatai F.C. in a 2–1 defeat. He would go on to score his first goal for the club in a league game on 3 January 2022 against Qingdao FC in a game that ended in a 4–1 victory.

On 15 February 2025, Shan joined Chinese Super League club Qingdao West Coast.

== Career statistics ==
As of 31 December 2022

Appearances and goals by club, season and competition
| Club | Season | League | | | National cup | | League cup | | Continental | | Total | |
| Club | Season | Division | Apps | Goals | Apps | Goals | Apps | Goals | Apps | Goals | Apps | Goals |
|---|---|---|---|---|---|---|---|---|---|---|---|---|
| Beijing Guoan | 2016 | Chinese Super League | 2 | 0 | 0 | 0 | – | | – | | 2 | 0 |
| Vitória Guimarães B | 2018–19 | LigaPro | 4 | 0 | 0 | 0 | 0 | 0 | – | | 4 | 0 |
| Dalian Pro | 2020 | Chinese Super League | 0 | 0 | 0 | 0 | – | | – | | 0 | 0 |
| Dalian Pro | 2021 | Chinese Super League | 16 | 2 | 3 | 0 | – | | 2 (Note: Appearance(s) in Promotion/Relegation Play-offs) | 0 | 21 | 2 |
| Dalian Pro | 2022 | Chinese Super League | 3 | 0 | 0 | 0 | – | | – | | 3 | 0 |
| Dalian Pro | Total | | 19 | 2 | 3 | 0 | 0 | 0 | 2 | 0 | 24 | 2 |
| Career total | | | 25 | 2 | 3 | 0 | 0 | 0 | 2 | 0 | 30 | 2 |
