= Wang Haitao (footballer) =

Chinese association football player

Personal information
- Date of birth: 24 January 1997 (age 29)
- Height: 1.82 m (6 ft 0 in)
- Position: Defender

Team information
- Current team: Beijing BSU
- Number: 36

Youth career
- –2017: Beijing BSU
- 2016: → Beijing Guoan LeEco (youth loan)

Senior career*
Years	Team	Apps	(Gls)
2017–2020	Beijing BSU	62	(4)
2021–	Beijing BSU	2	(0)
- * Club domestic league appearances and goals as of 14:01, 24 August 2021 (UTC)

Wang Haitao (Chinese: 王海涛; born 24 January 1997) is a Chinese footballer currently playing as a defender for Beijing BSU.

== Career statistics ==
=== Club ===
As of 24 August 2021.

Club	Season	League			Cup		Other		Total	
Club	Season	Division	Apps	Goals	Apps	Goals	Apps	Goals	Apps	Goals
Beijing BSU	2017	China League One	4	0	0	0	0	0	4	0
Beijing BSU	2018	China League One	25	0	1 (Note: Appearances in the Chinese FA Cup)	0	0	0	26	0
Beijing BSU	2019	China League One	22	2	2	0	0	0	24	2
Beijing BSU	2020	China League One	15	2	0	0	0	0	15	2
Beijing BSU	2021	China League One	2	0	1	0	0	0	3	0
Career total			68	4	4	0	0	0	72	4
