= Li Hang (footballer) =

Chinese footballer (born 1989)

Li Hang 李行
Personal information
- Date of birth: September 19, 1989 (age 37)
- Place of birth: Wuhan, Hubei, China
- Height: 1.82 m (5 ft 11 1/2 in)
- Position: Midfielder

Senior career*
Years	Team	Apps	(Gls)
2009–2015	Wuhan Zall	112	(7)
2016–2017	Hebei China Fortune	48	(2)
2018–2022	Wuhan Yangtze River	89	(4)

International career^{‡}
2019	China	3	(0)
Medal record
Representing China
Men's football
EAFF Championship
Bronze medal – third place	2019 South Korea	Team
- * Club domestic league appearances and goals as of 31 December 2020 ‡ National team caps and goals as of 18 December 2019

Li Hang (Chinese: 李行; born 19 September 1989) is a Chinese football coach and former professional footballer.

== Club career ==
In 2009, Li Hang started his professional footballer career with Hubei Greenery in the China League Two. He would eventually make his league debut for Wuhan on 8 March 2013 in a game against Jiangsu Sainty, coming on as a substitute for Yao Hanlin in the 71st minute. He would go on to part of squad that came runners-up within the division and gain promotion to the top tier at the end of the 2012 China League One season. After only one season within the top flight the club were relegated at the end of the 2013 Chinese Super League season.

On 25 February 2016, Li transferred to Chinese Super League side Hebei China Fortune. Li returned to Wuhan Zall on 26 February 2018. He would be an integral member of the squad and help gain promotion to the top tier for the club by winning the 2018 China League One division.

== International career ==
On 10 December 2019, Li made his international debut in a 1-2 defeat to Japan in the 2019 EAFF E-1 Football Championship.

== Career statistics ==
Statistics accurate as of match played 31 December 2020.

Appearances and goals by club, season and competition
Club	Season	League			National Cup		Continental		Other		Total	
Club	Season	Division	Apps	Goals	Apps	Goals	Apps	Goals	Apps	Goals	Apps	Goals
Wuhan Zall	2009	China League Two			-		-		-			
Wuhan Zall	2010	China League One	15	2	-		-		-		15	2
Wuhan Zall	2011	China League One	17	0	0	0	-		-		17	0
Wuhan Zall	2012	China League One	8	0	1	0	-		-		9	0
Wuhan Zall	2013	Chinese Super League	26	2	0	0	-		-		26	2
Wuhan Zall	2014	China League One	28	3	0	0	-		-		28	3
Wuhan Zall	2015	China League One	18	0	0	0	-		-		18	0
Wuhan Zall	Total		112	7	1	0	0	0	0	0	113	7
Hebei China Fortune	2016	Chinese Super League	28	0	0	0	-		-		28	0
Hebei China Fortune	2017	Chinese Super League	20	2	2	0	-		-		22	2
Hebei China Fortune	Total		48	2	2	0	0	0	0	0	50	2
Wuhan Zall	2018	China League One	29	0	0	0	-		-		29	0
Wuhan Zall	2019	Chinese Super League	30	1	0	0	-		-		30	1
Wuhan Zall	2020	Chinese Super League	11	1	0	0	-		2 (Note: Appearance(s) in CSL Relegation play-offs)	2	13	3
Wuhan Zall	Total		70	2	0	0	0	0	2	2	72	3
Career total			230	11	3	0	0	0	2	2	235	13

== Honours ==
=== Club ===
Wuhan Zall

- China League One: 2018
