= Zhong Jiyu =

Chinese association football player

Personal information
- Date of birth: 5 January 1997 (age 29)
- Height: 1.70 m (5 ft 7 in)
- Position: Midfielder

Team information
- Current team: Ji'nan Xingzhou

Youth career
- 2013–2017: Beijing Guoan

Senior career*
Years	Team	Apps	(Gls)
2016–2017	Beijing BIT (loan)	26	(0)
2018–2020	Shijiazhuang Ever Bright	65	(3)
2021-2022	Beijing BIT	16	(0)
2022-	Ji'nan Xingzhou	0	(0)
- * Club domestic league appearances and goals as of 14:01, 26 April 2022 (UTC)

Zhong Jiyu (Chinese: 钟纪宇; born 5 January 1997) is a Chinese footballer who plays as a midfielder for Ji'nan Xingzhou.

== Club career ==
Zhong Jiyu would play for the Beijing Guoan youth team and was loaned out to third tier football club BIT for the 2016 China League Two campaign to start his senior career. After two seasons on loan at BIT, Zhong joined second tier club Shijiazhuang Ever Bright on 9 February 2018. He would go on to make his debut for the club on 22 April 2018 in a league game against Liaoning F.C. that ended in a 2-2 draw. On 14 May 2019, Zhong had a video of him posted where he was caught drunk, after an investigation by the club and an apology the club stood by him. Zhong would repay the club by going on to score his first goal for the team on 18 May 2019 in a league game against Heilongjiang Lava Spring in a 2-0 victory. This was followed by him becoming a vital member of the team that gained promotion into the top tier at the end of 2019 league season.

== Career statistics ==
As of 31 December 2020.

Club	Season	League			National Cup		Continental		Other		Total	
Club	Season	Division	Apps	Goals	Apps	Goals	Apps	Goals	Apps	Goals	Apps	Goals
BIT (loan)	2016	China League Two	6	0	0	0	–		1 (Note: Appearances in the China League Two playoffs)	0	7	0
BIT (loan)	2017	China League Two	17	0	0	0	–		2	0	19	0
BIT (loan)	Total		23	0	0	0	0	0	3	0	26	0
Shijiazhuang Ever Bright	2018	China League One	21	0	0	0	–		–		21	0
Shijiazhuang Ever Bright	2019	China League One	29	2	1	0	–		–		30	2
Shijiazhuang Ever Bright	2020	Chinese Super League	15	1	1	0	–		–		16	1
Shijiazhuang Ever Bright	Total		65	3	2	0	0	0	0	0	67	3
Career total			88	3	2	0	0	0	3	0	93	3
