= Zhu Chaoqing =

Chinese footballer

Zhu Chaoqing 朱朝庆
Personal information
- Date of birth: 28 February 1995 (age 31)
- Place of birth: Heze, Shandong, China
- Height: 1.76 m (5 ft 9 1/2 in)
- Position: Forward

Youth career
- 2010–2016: Beijing Guoan

Senior career*
Years	Team	Apps	(Gls)
2016–2019	Beijing Guoan	5	(0)
2016	→ Sichuan Longfor (loan)	19	(1)
- * Club domestic league appearances and goals as of 15 July 2018

Zhu Chaoqing (simplified Chinese: 朱朝庆; traditional Chinese: 朱朝慶; pinyin: Zhū Cháoqìng; born 28 February 1995) is a retired Chinese footballer.

== Club career ==
Chaoqing started his professional football career in 2016 when he was loaned to China League Two side Sichuan Longfor from Beijing Sinobo Guoan. He played 19 league matches in the 2016 season; however, Sichuan Longfor failed to promoted to the second tier after losing to Yunnan Lijiang in the Semi-finals of 2016 China League Two Play-offs. He scored his first senior goal on 22 October 2016 in the third-place match which Sichuan lost to Jiangxi Liansheng 3–2.

Chaoqing returned to Beijing Guoan in 2017 and was promoted to the first team by José González. On 10 August 2017, he made his debut for Beijing in a 2–2 away draw against Tianjin Quanjian, coming on as a substitute for Jiang Tao. At the end of the 2017 season, Chaoqing went on to make five appearances for the club in all competitions.

== Career statistics ==
As of 15 July 2018

Club performance			League		Cup		League Cup		Continental		Total	
Season	Club	League	Apps	Goals	Apps	Goals	Apps	Goals	Apps	Goals	Apps	Goals
China PR			League		FA Cup		CSL Cup		Asia		Total	
2016	Sichuan Longfor	China League Two	19	1	1	0	-		-		20	1
2017	Beijing Sinobo Guoan	Chinese Super League	5	0	0	0	-		-		5	0
2018	Beijing Sinobo Guoan	Chinese Super League	0	0	0	0	-		-		0	0
Total	China PR		24	1	1	0	0	0	0	0	25	1
