= Jin Pengxiang =

Chinese football player

Jin Pengxiang 晋鹏翔
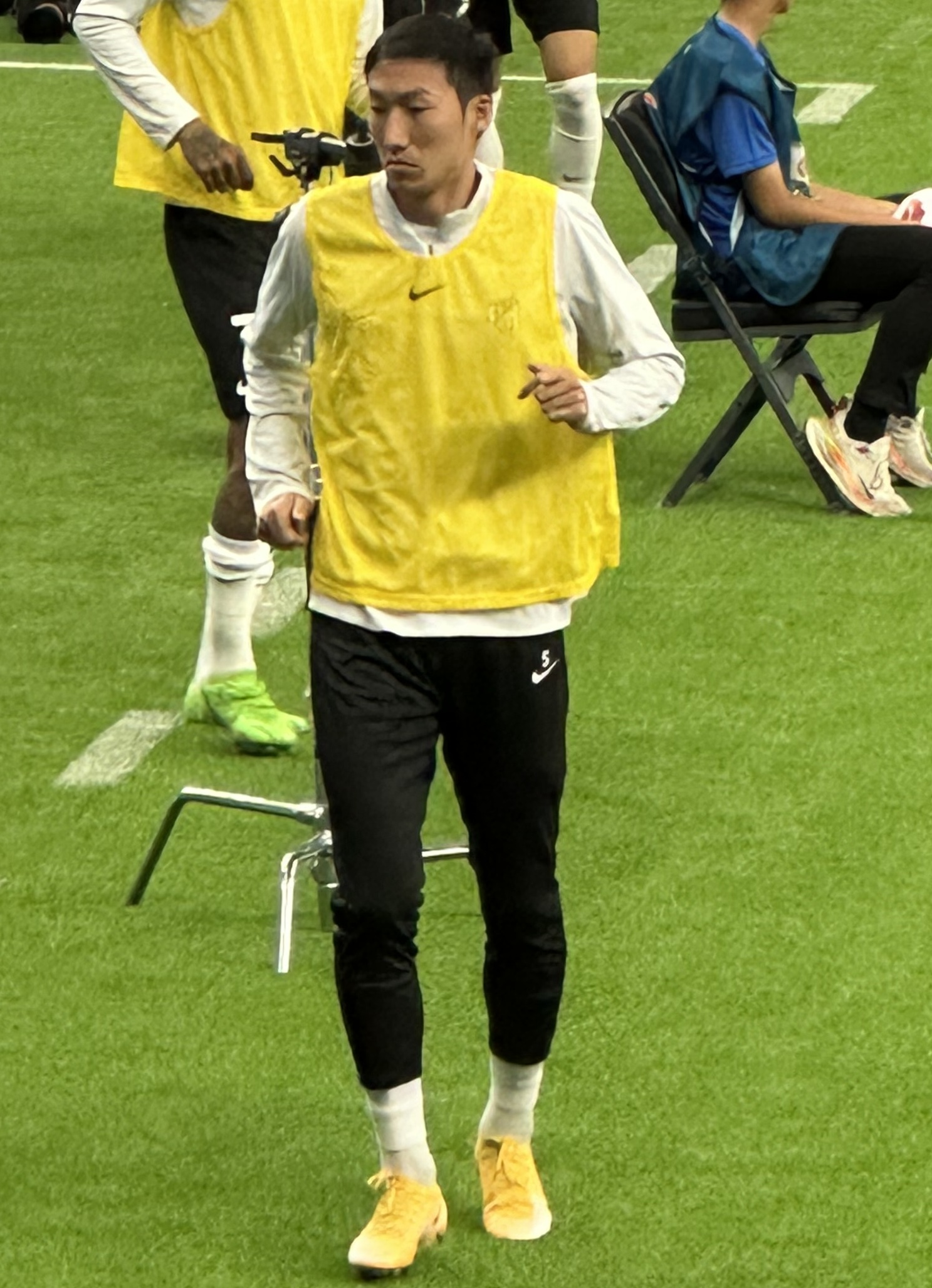
- Jin Pengxiang in April 2025

Personal information
- Date of birth: January 25, 1990 (age 36)
- Place of birth: Dalian, Liaoning, China
- Height: 1.90 m (6 ft 3 in)
- Position: Defender

Team information
- Current team: Chongqing Tonglianglong
- Number: 6

Youth career
- Dalian Shide
- 2006–2009: Hangzhou Greentown

Senior career*
Years	Team	Apps	(Gls)
2007–2009	Hangzhou Sanchao	?	(?)
2010–2011	Hangzhou Greentown	19	(0)
2012–2014	Dalian Aerbin	72	(0)
2015–2022	Beijing Guoan	31	(1)
2016	→ Tianjin Quanjian (loan)	7	(0)
2018	→ Dalian Yifang (loan)	1	(0)
2019	→ Guangzhou R&F (loan)	7	(0)
2023	Zibo Qisheng	2	(0)
2023	Guangxi Pingguo Haliao	8	(0)
2024–2025	Dalian Yingbo	49	(0)
2026–	Chongqing Tonglianglong	8	(0)
- * Club domestic league appearances and goals as of 19 November 2026

Jin Pengxiang (Chinese: 晋鹏翔; pinyin: Jìn Péngxiáng; born 25 January 1990) is a Chinese professional footballer who plays for Chinese football club Chongqing Tonglianglong.

== Club career ==
Jin joined Hangzhou Greentown youth system from Dalian Shide in 2006. He started his professional career in 2007 when he was sent to China League Two side Hangzhou Sanchao. He was promoted to Hangzhou's first team in 2010. On 18 June 2011, Jin made his Chinese Super League debut in a 1–0 home victory over Shanghai Shenhua, coming on as a substitute for Wu Wei in the 62nd minute.

Jin was put on the transfer list in January 2012 after Takeshi Okada became the head coach of the club. On 5 February, he transferred to Super League newcomers Dalian Aerbin on a five-year deal. He made his debut for Dalian Aerbin on 11 March 2013 in a 1–0 away defeat against Tianjin Teda.

On 2 February 2015, he transferred to fellow Super League side Beijing Guoan. On 4 July 2016, he went out on loan to China League One side Tianjin Quanjian until 31 December 2016. On 10 July 2018, he signed with Dalian Yifang on a half-year loan deal. On 25 February 2019, Jin was loaned again to Guangzhou R&F for the 2019 season.

On 8 June 2022, while playing for Beijing Guoan, he scored the first goal of his career in a 3–2 win over Chengdu Rongcheng in the Chinese Super League. He left Beijing at the end of the 2022 Chinese Super League season when his contracted finished.

On 29 January 2026, Jin joined Chinese Super League club Chongqing Tonglianglong.

== Career statistics ==
Statistics accurate as of match played 11 October 2026.

Appearances and goals by club, season and competition
Club	Season	League			National Cup		Continental		Other		Total	
Club	Season	Division	Apps	Goals	Apps	Goals	Apps	Goals	Apps	Goals	Apps	Goals
Hangzhou Sanchao	2007	China League Two			–		–		–			
Hangzhou Sanchao	2008	China League Two			–		–		–			
Hangzhou Sanchao	2009	China League Two			–		–		–			
Hangzhou Sanchao	Total				0	0	0	0	0	0		
Hangzhou Greentown	2010	Chinese Super League	0	0	–		–		–		0	0
Hangzhou Greentown	2011	Chinese Super League	19	0	1	0	0	0	–		20	0
Hangzhou Greentown	Total		19	0	1	0	0	0	0	0	20	0
Dalian Aerbin	2012	Chinese Super League	24	0	1	0	–		–		25	0
Dalian Aerbin	2013	Chinese Super League	27	0	3	0	–		–		30	0
Dalian Aerbin	2014	Chinese Super League	21	0	0	0	–		–		21	0
Dalian Aerbin	Total		72	0	4	0	0	0	0	0	76	0
Beijing Guoan	2015	Chinese Super League	2	0	1	0	1	0	–		4	0
Beijing Guoan	2016	Chinese Super League	4	0	0	0	–		–		4	0
Beijing Guoan	2017	Chinese Super League	14	0	0	0	–		–		14	0
Beijing Guoan	2018	Chinese Super League	1	0	0	0	–		–		1	0
Beijing Guoan	2020	Chinese Super League	0	0	1	0	0	0	–		1	0
Beijing Guoan	2021	Chinese Super League	6	0	1	0	0	0	–		7	0
Beijing Guoan	2022	Chinese Super League	4	1	0	0	–		–		4	1
Beijing Guoan	Total		31	1	3	0	1	0	0	0	35	1
Tianjin Quanjian (loan)	2016	China League One	7	0	2	0	–		–		9	0
Dalian Yifang (loan)	2018	Chinese Super League	1	0	1	0	–		–		2	0
Guangzhou R&F (loan)	2019	Chinese Super League	7	0	1	0	–		–		8	0
Zibo Qisheng	2023	China League Two	2	0	1	0	–		–		3	0
Guangxi Pingguo Haliao	2023	China League One	8	0	0	0	–		–		8	0
Dalian Yingbo	2024	China League One	29	0	1	0	–		–		30	0
Dalian Yingbo	2025	Chinese Super League	20	0	1	0	–		–		21	0
Dalian Yingbo	Total		49	0	2	0	0	0	0	0	51	0
Chongqing Tonglianglong	2026	Chinese Super League	8	0	0	0	–		–		8	0
Career total			204	1	15	0	1	0	0	0	220	1

== Honours ==
=== Club ===
Tianjin Quanjian

- China League One: 2016

Beijing Guoan

- Chinese FA Cup: 2018
