= Zhang Yan (footballer, born 1997) =

Chinese association football player

Personal information
- Date of birth: 30 March 1997 (age 29)
- Place of birth: Beijing, China
- Height: 1.88 m (6 ft 2 in)
- Position: Goalkeeper

Team information
- Current team: Liaoning Tieren
- Number: 29

Senior career*
Years	Team	Apps	(Gls)
2016–2018	Beijing Guoan	0	(0)
2018–2020	Jiangsu Suning	12	(0)
2021–2025	Chengdu Rongcheng	56	(0)
2025	→ Chengdu Rongcheng B (res.)	1	(0)
2026–	Liaoning Tieren	20	(0)

International career^{‡}
2018	China U19	1	(0)
- * Club domestic league appearances and goals as of 22 November 2026 ‡ National team caps and goals as of 14:01, 31 December 2019 (UTC)

Zhang Yan (simplified Chinese: 张岩; traditional Chinese: 張岩; pinyin: Zhāng Yán; born 30 March 1997) is a Chinese professional footballer currently playing for Chinese Super League club Liaoning Tieren as a goalkeeper.

== Club career ==
Zhang Yan would start his professional career when he was promoted to the senior team of Beijing Guoan during the 2016 Chinese Super League season. After spending several seasons with the club he transferred to Jiangsu Suning on 13 July 2018. On 25 March 2019 Zhang would make his debut when he came on as a substitute for Gu Chao in a league game against Hebei China Fortune F.C. in a 3–2 defeat. He would be the clubs second choice goalkeeper as the club won their first league title, however on 28 February 2021, the parent company Suning Holdings Group announced that operations were going to cease immediately alongside the women and youth teams due to financial difficulties.

On 8 April 2021, Zhang joined second-tier club Chengdu Rongcheng on a free transfer. He made his debut for the club in a league game on 20 May 2021 against Jiangxi Beidamen in a 2–0 defeat. He would fight for the goalkeeping position with Zhang Yinuo and aid the team to promotion to the top tier at the end of the 2021 league campaign.

In 2025 season, Zhang was sent to Chengdu Rongcheng B in China League Two.

On 14 January 2026, Zhang joined Chinese Super League club Liaoning Tieren.

== Career statistics ==
As of match played 19 J 2026.

Appearances and goals by club, season and competition
Club	Season	League			Cup		Continental		Other		Total	
Club	Season	Division	Apps	Goals	Apps	Goals	Apps	Goals	Apps	Goals	Apps	Goals
Beijing Guoan	2016	Chinese Super League	0	0	0	0	–		–		0	0
Beijing Guoan	2017	Chinese Super League	0	0	0	0	–		–		0	0
Beijing Guoan	2018	Chinese Super League	0	0	0	0	–		–		0	0
Beijing Guoan	Total		0	0	0	0	0	0	0	0	0	0
Jiangsu Suning	2018	Chinese Super League	0	0	0	0	–		–		0	0
Jiangsu Suning	2019	Chinese Super League	10	0	2	0	–		–		12	0
Jiangsu Suning	2020	Chinese Super League	2	0	3	0	–		–		5	0
Jiangsu Suning	Total		12	0	5	0	0	0	0	0	17	0
Chengdu Rongcheng	2021	China League One	10	0	3	0	–		2 (Note: Appearance(s) in CSL Relegation play-offs)	0	15	0
Chengdu Rongcheng	2022	Chinese Super League	21	0	0	0	–		–		21	0
Chengdu Rongcheng	2023	Chinese Super League	16	0	0	0	–		–		16	0
Chengdu Rongcheng	2024	Chinese Super League	7	0	0	0	–		–		7	0
Chengdu Rongcheng	Total		54	0	3	0	0	0	2	0	59	0
Chengdu Rongcheng B	2025	China League Two	1	0	–		–		–		1	0
Liaoning Tieren	2026	Chinese Super League	6	0	1	0	–		–		7	0
Career total			73	0	9	0	0	0	2	0	84	0

== Honours ==
=== Club ===
Beijing Guoan

- Chinese FA Cup: 2018

Jiangsu Suning

- Chinese Super League: 2020
