= Du Mingyang =

Chinese professional football player

Du Mingyang 杜明洋
Personal information
- Date of birth: 20 January 1993 (age 33)
- Place of birth: Xuzhou, Jiangsu, China
- Height: 1.78 m (5 ft 10 in)
- Position: Midfielder

Senior career*
Years	Team	Apps	(Gls)
2012	Beijing Youth	23	(3)
2013–2018	Beijing Guoan	7	(1)
2018	→ Wuhan Chufeng Heli (loan)	0	(0)
2019–2022	Meizhou Hakka	27	(0)
- * Club domestic league appearances and goals as of 31 December 2021

Du Mingyang (Chinese: 杜明洋; born 20 January 1993) is a Chinese professional football player who currently plays as a midfielder.

== Club career ==
In 2013, Du Mingyang started his professional footballer career with Beijing Guoan in the Chinese Super League. He was sent to the reserved team in 2015. On 18 May 2016, Du made his debut for Beijing Guoan in the 2016 Chinese Super League against Hebei China Fortune, coming on as a substitute for Zhang Xiaobin in the 78th minute. He scored his first goal for Beijing Guoan on 23 October 2016, in a 3–1 home win against Guangzhou R&F. In March 2018，Du signed for China Amateur Football League side Wuhan Chufeng Heli.

Du transferred to League One side Meizhou Hakka in February 2019. He would make his debut in a league game on 10 March 2019 against Beijing BSU that ended in a 1-0 victory.

== Career statistics ==
Statistics accurate as of match played 31 December 2021.

Club	Season	League			National Cup		Continental		Other		Total	
Club	Season	Division	Apps	Goals	Apps	Goals	Apps	Goals	Apps	Goals	Apps	Goals
Beijing Youth	2012	China League Two	23	3	-		-		-		23	3
Beijing Guoan	2013	Chinese Super League	0	0	0	0	0	0	-		0	0
Beijing Guoan	2014	Chinese Super League	0	0	0	0	0	0	-		0	0
Beijing Guoan	2016	Chinese Super League	5	1	1	1	-		-		6	2
Beijing Guoan	2017	Chinese Super League	2	0	1	0	-		-		3	0
Beijing Guoan	Total		7	1	2	1	0	0	0	0	9	2
Wuhan Chufeng Heli (loan)	2018	CMCL	-		3	0	-		-		3	0
Meizhou Hakka	2019	China League One	27	0	1	0	-		-		28	0
Meizhou Hakka	2020	China League One	0	0	0	0	-		-		0	0
Meizhou Hakka	Total		27	0	1	0	0	0	0	0	28	0
Career total			57	4	6	1	0	0	0	0	63	5
