= Li Bowen =

Chinese association football player

Personal information
- Date of birth: 23 January 1995 (age 31)
- Place of birth: Taiyuan, Shanxi, China
- Height: 1.76 m (5 ft 9 in)
- Position: Defender

Team information
- Current team: Xiemen Feilu
- Number: 16

Youth career
- –2016: Beijing Guoan

Senior career*
Years	Team	Apps	(Gls)
2016–2018	Beijing Guoan	0	(0)
2016	→ Meizhou Hakka (loan)	2	(0)
2017	→ Beijing IT (loan)	15	(1)
2018–2020	Aves	0	(0)
2018–2019	→ Montalegre (loan)	1	(0)
2019–2020	→ Vilar de Perdizes (loan)	11	(0)
2020–2024	Shenzhen Peng City	33	(0)
2024	→ Foshan Nanshi (loan)	23	(0)
2025–2026	Foshan Nanshi	43	(0)
2026–	Xiemen Feilu	0	(0)
- * Club domestic league appearances and goals as of 14:01, 19 May 2024 (UTC)

Li Bowen (Chinese: 李博文; born 23 January 1995) is a Chinese footballer currently playing as a defender for Xiemen Feilu.

== Career statistics ==
=== Club ===
As of 19 May 2024.

Club	Season	League			Cup		Continental		Other		Total	
Club	Season	Division	Apps	Goals	Apps	Goals	Apps	Goals	Apps	Goals	Apps	Goals
Beijing Guoan	2016	Chinese Super League	0	0	0	0	–		0	0	0	0
Beijing Guoan	2017	Chinese Super League	0	0	0	0	–		0	0	0	0
Beijing Guoan	2018	Chinese Super League	0	0	0	0	–		0	0	0	0
Beijing Guoan	Total		0	0	0	0	0	0	0	0	0	0
Meizhou Hakka (loan)	2016	China League One	2	0	2	0	–		0	0	4	0
Beijing IT (loan)	2017	China League Two	15	1	0	0	–		2 (Note: Appearances in the China League Two playoffs)	0	17	1
Aves	2018–19	Primeira Liga	0	0	0	0	–		0	0	0	0
Montalegre (loan)	2018–19	Campeonato de Portugal	1	0	0	0	–		0	0	1	0
Vilar de Perdizes (loan)	2019–20	Honra Vila Real	11	0	0	0	–		0	0	11	0
Sichuan Jiuniu/Shenzhen Peng City	2020	China League One	0	0	0	0	–		0	0	0	0
Sichuan Jiuniu/Shenzhen Peng City	2021	China League One	21	0	3	0	–		0	0	24	0
Sichuan Jiuniu/Shenzhen Peng City	2022	China League One	11	0	2	0	–		0	0	13	0
Sichuan Jiuniu/Shenzhen Peng City	2023	China League One	1	0	2	0	–		0	0	3	0
Sichuan Jiuniu/Shenzhen Peng City	Total		33	0	7	0	0	0	0	0	40	0
Foshan Nanshi (loan)	2024	China League One	8	0	1	0	–		0	0	9	0
Career total			70	1	10	0	0	0	2	0	82	1

== Honours ==
=== Club ===
Sichuan Jiuniu/Shenzhen Peng City

- China League One: 2023
