= Zhang Chiming =

Chinese footballer

Zhang Chiming 张池明
Personal information
- Full name: Zhang Chiming
- Date of birth: 7 January 1989 (age 37)
- Place of birth: Chengdu, Sichuan, China
- Height: 1.80 m (5 ft 11 in)
- Position: Right winger

Youth career
- 2002–2004: Chengdu Youth
- 2005–2007: Sheffield United
- 2007–2008: FC Porto

Senior career*
Years	Team	Apps	(Gls)
2006–2007	Chengdu Blades	0	(0)
2009–2010	SV Horn	14	(0)
2011–2015	Chongqing Lifan	123	(14)
2015–2018	Beijing Guoan	52	(4)
2018–2020	Tianjin TEDA	12	(0)

International career^{‡}
2015	China	3	(0)

Managerial career
- 2022–2023: Chengdu Youth
- 2024: Shijiazhuang Gongfu (assistant)
- 2026: Foshan Nanshi
Medal record
Representing China
Men's football
EAFF Championship
Silver medal – second place	2015 China	Team
- * Club domestic league appearances and goals as of 31 December 2020 ‡ National team caps and goals as of 25 October 2015

Zhang Chiming (simplified Chinese: 张池明; traditional Chinese: 張池明; pinyin: Zhāng Chímíng; born 7 January 1989) is a Chinese football coach and retired professional footballer. He spent the majority of his professional career with Chongqing Lifan and Beijing Guoan, and was featured in 3 games with the Chinese national team.

== Club career ==
Zhang Chiming started his football career when he received training with Chengdu Youth where he was considered good enough to join Ligue 1 side FC Metz for further training in 2004. On 29 September 2004, after the French training camp had ended, Zhang was recommended to train with Premier League side Everton by one of their players Li Tie. On 3 January 2005, English Championship side Sheffield United became interested in Zhang and officially signed him to their youth academy. He would struggle to receive any playing time because he wasn't granted a work permit; however, on 11 December 2005, the club officially took over China League One side Chengdu Blades and Zhang was incorporated into the squad. At Chengdu, Zhang played for their youth academy and was eventually promoted to the first team. Primeira Liga side FC Porto also became interested in Zhang who eventually signed for a two-year deal on 17 August 2007 after a drawn out transfer that required international clearance.

At FC Porto, Zhang was unable to be promoted to the club's first team and was free to leave the club once his contract expired. He then had a trial with 2. Bundesliga side FC Augsburg on 23 August 2008 which was followed by another trial with Austrian Bundesliga side LASK Linz on 9 January 2009. Zhang would eventually find a club with Austrian Regional League side SV Horn who he joined on 20 February 2009. He made his debut for the club on 27 March 2009 in a 0-0 draw against SV Mattersburg II, coming on as a substitute. In the 2008-09 season, he played nine games as the club finished second within the third tier; however, he only played four games in the following season and was allowed to leave the club.

Zhang then decided to join China League One side Chongqing Lifan on 22 February 2011. He made his debut for the club on 27 March 2011 in 1-1 draw against Beijing Baxy. This was followed by his first goal for the club, also against Beijing, on 4 May 2011 in a 3-0 win in the 2011 Chinese FA Cup.

On 10 July 2015, Zhang transferred to fellow Chinese Super League side Beijing Guoan. He made his debut for the club on 20 July 2015 in a 0-0 draw against Shanghai SIPG.

On 15 June 2018, Zhang transferred to Tianjin TEDA.

== Coaching Career ==
A 2022 interview with Chengdu Football Association, where Zhang was working as a youth team coach at the time, stated that Zhang had retired from professional football. Speaking about his footballing career, he said that he regret not having enough understanding about football and that he never reached the goals he set for himself at both Beijing Guoan and with the Chinese national team.

On 11 March 2026, Zhang was appointed as the head coach of China League One side Foshan Nanshi. On 5 August 2026, Zhang decided to resign with his coaching team.

== International career ==
Zhang made his debut for the Chinese national team on 27 March 2015 in a 2-2 draw against Haiti.

== Career statistics ==
Statistics accurate as of match played 31 December 2020.

Appearances and goals by club, season and competition
Club	Season	League			National Cup		Continental		Other		Total	
Club	Season	Division	Apps	Goals	Apps	Goals	Apps	Goals	Apps	Goals	Apps	Goals
Chengdu Blades	2006	China League One	0	0	0	0	-		-		0	0
Chengdu Blades	2007	China League One	0	0	-		-		-		0	0
Chengdu Blades	Total		0	0	0	0	0	0	0	0	0	0
SV Horn	2008-09	Austrian Regionalliga	9	0	0	0	-		-		9	0
SV Horn	2009-10	Austrian Regionalliga	5	0	1	0	-		-		6	0
SV Horn	Total		14	0	1	0	0	0	0	0	15	0
Chongqing Lifan	2011	China League One	22	4	1	1	-		-		23	5
Chongqing Lifan	2012	China League One	29	3	0	0	-		-		29	3
Chongqing Lifan	2013	China League One	27	3	1	2	-		-		28	5
Chongqing Lifan	2014	China League One	29	3	1	0	-		-		30	3
Chongqing Lifan	2015	Chinese Super League	16	1	1	0	-		-		17	1
Chongqing Lifan	Total		123	14	4	3	0	0	0	0	127	17
Beijing Guoan	2015	Chinese Super League	9	0	0	0	0	0	-		9	0
Beijing Guoan	2016	Chinese Super League	23	1	4	2	-		-		27	3
Beijing Guoan	2017	Chinese Super League	20	3	0	0	-		-		20	3
Beijing Guoan	Total		52	4	4	2	0	0	0	0	56	6
Tianjin TEDA	2018	Chinese Super League	9	0	0	0	-		-		9	0
Tianjin TEDA	2019	Chinese Super League	3	0	3	0	-		-		6	0
Tianjin TEDA	Total		12	0	3	0	0	0	0	0	15	0
Career total			201	18	12	5	0	0	0	0	213	23

== Honours ==
=== Club ===
Chongqing Lifan

- China League One: 2014
