= Wu Guichao =

Chinese association football player

Personal information
- Date of birth: 2 January 1997 (age 29)
- Place of birth: Beihai, Guangxi
- Height: 1.73 m (5 ft 8 in)
- Position: Midfielder

Team information
- Current team: Chengdu Rongcheng
- Number: 15

Youth career
- Beijing Guoan

Senior career*
Years	Team	Apps	(Gls)
2017	Beijing Guoan	0	(0)
2018–2020	Guangdong South China Tiger	14	(1)
2020–	Chengdu Rongcheng	63	(9)
- * Club domestic league appearances and goals as of 14:01, 8 January 2023 (UTC)

Wu Guichao (Chinese: 吴贵超; born 2 January 1997) is a Chinese footballer currently playing as a midfielder for Chengdu Rongcheng.

== Club career ==
Wu Guichao would play for the Beijing Guoan youth team before being promoted to the senior team during the 2017 Chinese Super League season. On 20 February 2018 he would transfer to second-tier football club Guangdong South China Tiger. He would make his debut on 28 July 2018 in a league game against Yanbian, which ended in a 2–0 defeat. This would be followed by his first goal, which was in a league on 23 September 2018 against Shenzhen that ended in a 2–2 draw.

On 3 February 2020, Guangdong South China Tiger was dissolved and Wu was free to join second-tier football club Chengdu Rongcheng. He would go on to make his debut and score his first goal for the club in a league game on 12 September 2020 against Beijing Renhe, which ended in a 3–2 victory. The following season he would establish himself as a vital member within the team and aid them to promotion to the top tier at the end of the 2021 league campaign.

== Career statistics ==
As of 8 January 2023.

Club	Season	League			Cup		Continental		Other		Total	
Club	Season	Division	Apps	Goals	Apps	Goals	Apps	Goals	Apps	Goals	Apps	Goals
Beijing Guoan	2017	Chinese Super League	0	0	0	0	–		–		0	0
Meixian Techand/ Guangdong South China Tiger	2018	China League One	10	1	0	0	–		–		10	1
Meixian Techand/ Guangdong South China Tiger	2019	China League One	4	0	0	0	–		–		4	0
Meixian Techand/ Guangdong South China Tiger	Total		14	1	0	0	0	0	0	0	14	1
Chengdu Better City/ Chengdu Rongcheng	2020	China League One	13	2	1	0	–		–		14	2
Chengdu Better City/ Chengdu Rongcheng	2021	China League One	29	5	1	0	–		0 (Note: Appearance(s) in CSL Relegation play-offs)	0	30	5
Chengdu Better City/ Chengdu Rongcheng	2022	Chinese Super League	21	2	3	1	–		–		24	3
Chengdu Better City/ Chengdu Rongcheng	Total		63	9	5	1	0	0	0	0	68	10
Career total			77	10	5	1	0	0	0	0	82	11
