= Wang Hongyu =

Chinese Paralympic judoka (born 1989)

Personal information
- Nationality: Chinese
- Born: 1 January 1989 (age 37)

Sport
- Country: China
- Sport: Para judo
- Disability class: J2
- Weight class: +70 kg
Medal record
Women's para judo
Representing China
Paralympic Games
Bronze medal – third place	2024 Paris	+70 kg J2
Asian Para Games
Gold medal – first place	2022 Hangzhou	+70 kg J2

Wang Hongyu (born 1 January 1989) is a Chinese Paralympic judoka. She represented China at the 2024 Summer Paralympics.

== Career ==
Wang represented China at the 2024 Summer Paralympics and won a bronze medal in the +70 kg J2 event.
