= 1995 Guangzhou Apollo F.C. season =

Guangzhou Apollo F.C. 1995
- Manager: (China) Zhou Suian (to 9 June) (China) Zhang Jingtian (from 10 June)
- Stadium: Yuexiushan Stadium
- Jia-A League: 5th
- FA Cup: 1st Round
- Top goalscorer: League: (China) Peng Weiguo (8); All: (China) Peng Weiguo (China) Tan Ende (8)
- Average home league attendance: 18,818

The 1995 season is the 42nd year in Guangzhou Football Club's existence, their 28th season in the Chinese football league and the 2nd season in the professional football league.

== Squad ==
Note: Flags indicate national team as defined under FIFA eligibility rules; some limited exceptions apply. Players may hold more than one non-FIFA nationality.

No.	Pos.	Nation	Player
0	GK	(China) CHN	Dong Guozhi
1	GK	(China) CHN	Huang Hongtao
2	DF	(China) CHN	Peng Changying
3	MF	(Australia) AUS	Martin Bourke (to June)
4	DF	(China) CHN	Chen Yaohua
5	MF	(China) CHN	Li Qiang
6	DF	(China) CHN	Li Yong
7	FW	(China) CHN	Hu Zhijun
8	MF	(China) CHN	Peng Weiguo (captain)
9	MF	(Australia) AUS	Brad Maloney (to June)
10	FW	(China) CHN	Luo Wensheng

No.	Pos.	Nation	Player
11	MF	(China) CHN	Feng Feng
12	DF	(China) CHN	Peng Jinbo
14	MF	(China) CHN	Zhang Bing
15	DF	(China) CHN	Mai Chao
16	MF	(China) CHN	Wen Zhijun
17	MF	(China) CHN	Zhu Weizhuo
18	FW	(China) CHN	Tan Ende
19	MF	(China) CHN	Lü Jianjun
20	FW	(China) CHN	Huang Weixiong (from July)
21	MF	(China) CHN	Peng Weijun
23	DF	(China) CHN	Huang Haibin

== Transfers ==
=== Winter ===
In

No.	Pos.	Nation	Player
3	MF	(Australia) AUS	Martin Bourke (loan from (Australia) Wollongong Wolves)
5	MF	(China) CHN	Li Qiang (from Qingdao Hainiu)
9	MF	(Australia) AUS	Brad Maloney (loan from (Australia) Marconi Stallions)

Out

No.	Pos.	Nation	Player
3	DF	(China) CHN	Shen Rong (loan to Guangzhou Songri)
5	DF	(China) CHN	Li Wei (loan to Shenzhen FC)
9	MF	(China) CHN	Cai Qinghui (loan to Guangzhou Songri)
20	FW	(China) CHN	Huang Weixiong (loan to (Hong Kong) Frankwell)
22	FW	(Japan) JPN	Isamu Tsuji (loan to (Hong Kong) Frankwell)

=== Summer ===
In

No.	Pos.	Nation	Player
20	FW	(China) CHN	Huang Weixiong (loan return from (Hong Kong) Frankwell)
-	FW	(Japan) JPN	Isamu Tsuji (loan return from (Hong Kong) Frankwell)

Out

No.	Pos.	Nation	Player
3	MF	(Australia) AUS	Martin Bourke (loan return to (Australia) Wollongong Wolves)
9	MF	(Australia) AUS	Brad Maloney (loan return to (Australia) Marconi Stallions)
10	FW	(China) CHN	Luo Wensheng (loan to (Hong Kong) Frankwell)
-	FW	(Japan) JPN	Isamu Tsuji (Retired)

== Match results ==
=== Friendly matches ===
Friendly matches
Date	Opponents	H / A	Result	
1994-12-01	(Hong Kong) Eastern	A	7 – 1	
1995-01-13	(South Korea) Gwangju	H	3 – 1	Wen Zhijun, Hu Zhijun, Peng Changying
1995-01-15	(Japan) Fukuoka	H	12 – 0	Hu Zhijun (7 goals)
1995-01-17	(Germany) Frankfurt	H	6 – 0	Wen Zhijun, Peng Weiguo, Chen Yaohua, Dong Guozhi, Feng Feng, Mai Chao
1995-02-19	(Japan) Bellmare Hiratsuka	H	1 – 1; 0 – 3 (PSO)	Hu Zhijun
1995-02-22	(South Korea) LG Cheetahs	H	1 – 1	Hu Zhijun
1995-05-25	(England) Tottenham Hotspur	H	1 – 2	Huang Qineng
1995-06-07	(Italy) AC Milan	H	1 – 4	Hu Zhijun
1995-12-07	(Norway) Kongsvinger	H	0 – 1	

=== Jia-A League ===
16 April 1995	Guangzhou Apollo	1 – 0	Qingdao Hainiu	Guangzhou
	Hu Zhijun 74'			Stadium: Yuexiushan Stadium

23 April 1995	Bayi	1 – 1	Guangzhou Apollo	Xi'an
	Hao Haidong 46'		Peng Weiguo 21'

30 April 1995	Guangdong Hongyuan	1 – 0	Guangzhou Apollo	Guangzhou
	Li Chaoyang 53'			Stadium: Guangdong People's Stadium

7 May 1995	Guangzhou Apollo	1 – 1	Shandong Jinan Taishan	Guangzhou
	Tan Ende 61'		Xing Rui 63'	Stadium: Yuexiushan Stadium

11 May 1995	Guangzhou Apollo	0 – 2	Shanghai Shenhua	Guangzhou
			Fan Zhiyi 80'; Liu Jun 83'	Stadium: Yuexiushan Stadium

21 May 1995	Tianjin Samsung	2 – 0	Guangzhou Apollo	Tianjin
	Wang Jun 38'; Yu Genwei 62'

28 May 1995	Yanbian Hyundai	0 – 1	Guangzhou Apollo	Yanji
			Peng Jinbo 42'

11 June 1995	Guangzhou Apollo	2 – 2	Beijing Guoan	Guangzhou
	Hu Zhijun 54'; Tan Ende 87'		Gao Hongbo 58', 90'	Stadium: Yuexiushan Stadium

6 August 1995	Sichuan Quanxing	0 – 2	Guangzhou Apollo	Chengdu
			Peng Weiguo 34'; Peng Weijun 40'

13 August 1995	Guangzhou Apollo	6 – 0	Liaoning Hangxing	Guangzhou
	Tan Ende 14', 37'; Peng Weiguo 30', 49', 77'; Peng Weijun 85'			Stadium: Yuexiushan Stadium

3 September 1995	Dalian Wanda	1 – 0	Guangzhou Apollo	Dalian
	Wei Yimin 1'

10 September 1995	Qingdao Hainiu	1 – 1	Guangzhou Apollo	Qingdao
	Bi Zilong 77'		Peng Weiguo 29'

17 September 1995	Guangzhou Apollo	1 – 1	Bayi	Guangzhou
	Hu Zhijun 76'		Hu Yunfeng 51'	Stadium: Yuexiushan Stadium

24 September 1995	Guangzhou Apollo	1 – 1	Guangdong Hongyuan	Guangzhou
	Hu Zhijun 83'		Li Chaoyang 43'	Stadium: Yuexiushan Stadium

1 October 1995	Shandong Jinan Taishan	4 – 0	Guangzhou Apollo	Jinan
	Xing Rui 3', 61'; Shao Yanjie 72'; Li Xiaopeng 79'

8 October 1995	Shanghai Shenhua	2 – 0	Guangzhou Apollo	Shanghai
	Fan Zhiyi 30'; Xie Hui 39'

15 October 1995	Guangzhou Apollo	5 – 1	Tianjin Samsung	Guangzhou
	Tan Ende 27', 53'; Hu Zhijun 35'; Peng Weiguo 68'; Peng Weijun 83'		Han Jinming 77'	Stadium: Yuexiushan Stadium

22 October 1995	Guangzhou Apollo	0 – 0	Yanbian Hyundai	Guangzhou
				Stadium: Yuexiushan Stadium

29 October 1995	Beijing Guoan	3 – 1	Guangzhou Apollo	Beijing
	Gao Hongbo 21'; Nan Fang 43', 50'		Peng Jinbo 16'

5 November 1995	Guangzhou Apollo	2 – 1	Sichuan Quanxing	Guangzhou
	Hu Zhijun 25'; Peng Weiguo 63'		Marmelo 37'	Stadium: Yuexiushan Stadium

12 November 1995	Liaoning Hangxing	1 – 2	Guangzhou Apollo	Shenyang
	Sun Xianlu 68'		Feng Feng 84'; Lü Jianjun 89'

19 November 1995	Guangzhou Apollo	1 – 2	Dalian Wanda	Guangzhou
	Hu Zhijun 4'		Wei Yimin 34'; Ma Lin 75'	Stadium: Yuexiushan Stadium

=== FA Cup ===
==== Round 1 ====
25 June 1995	Guangzhou Songri	4 – 2	Guangzhou Apollo	Guangzhou
	Feng Minzhi (2 goals); Li Zifei; Huo Rining		Tan Ende (2 goals)	Stadium: Guangdong People's Stadium

2 July 1995	Guangzhou Apollo	1 – 0	Guangzhou Songri	Guangzhou
	Li Yong 70'			Stadium: Yuexiushan Stadium
