= 1994 Guangzhou Apollo F.C. season =

Guangzhou Apollo F.C. 1994
- Manager: (China) Zhou Suian
- Stadium: Yuexiushan Stadium
- Jia-A League: Runners-up
- Top goalscorer: (China) Hu Zhijun (17 goals)
- Average home league attendance: 10,545
Home colours	Away colours

The 1994 season is the 41st year in Guangzhou Football Club's existence, their 27th season in the Chinese football league and the first season in the professional football league.

== Technical staff ==
Name	Job title
(China) Zhou Suian	Manager (from 7 Apr 1994)
(China) Huang Guocai	Assistant Manager (from 7 Apr 1994)
(China) Li Yong	Coach (from 7 Apr 1994)
(China) Mai Chao	Coach (from 7 Apr 1994)
(China) Du Qingen	U17 Team Coach (from 7 Apr 1994)
(China) Huang Guocai	Caretaker manager (from 1 Mar 1994 to 6 Apr 1994)

== Squad ==
Note: Flags indicate national team as defined under FIFA eligibility rules; some limited exceptions apply. Players may hold more than one non-FIFA nationality.

No.	Pos.	Nation	Player
0	GK	CHN	Dong Guozhi
1	GK	CHN	Huang Hongtao
2	DF	CHN	Peng Changying
3	DF	CHN	Shen Rong
4	DF	CHN	Chen Yaohua
5	DF	CHN	Li Wei
7	FW	CHN	Hu Zhijun
8	MF	CHN	Peng Weiguo
10	FW	CHN	Luo Wensheng
11	MF	CHN	Feng Feng

No.	Pos.	Nation	Player
12	DF	CHN	Peng Jinbo
15	DF	CHN	Mai Chao (captain)
16	MF	CHN	Wen Zhijun
17	MF	CHN	Zhu Weizhuo
18	FW	CHN	Tan Ende
19	FW	CHN	Lü Jianjun
20	FW	CHN	Huang Weixiong
21	MF	CHN	Peng Weijun
22	FW	JPN	Isamu Tsuji
23	DF	CHN	Huang Haibin

== Transfers ==
=== Winter ===
In

No.	Pos.	Nation	Player
5	DF	CHN	Li Wei (from Bayi)
11	MF	CHN	Feng Feng (from Bayi)
20	FW	CHN	Huang Weixiong (loan return from (Hong Kong) Happy Valley)
21	MF	CHN	Peng Weijun (loan return from (Hong Kong) Happy Valley)

Out

No.	Pos.	Nation	Player
-	MF	CHN	Wu Qunli (to (Hong Kong) South China)

=== Summer ===
In

No.	Pos.	Nation	Player
-	DF	SCO	Neil Armour (from (Scotland) Albion Rovers)

Out

No.	Pos.	Nation	Player
-	DF	SCO	Neil Armour (to (Hong Kong) Happy Valley)

== Match results ==
=== Friendly matches ===
Friendly matches
Date	Opponents	H / A	Result	Scorers
1993-11-28	(North Korea) Sinŭiju Locomotive	H	2 – 1	Hu Zhijun, Lü Jianjun
1994-02-02	Tianjin Yuancheng	H	7 – 0	Hu Zhijun(3), Isamu Tsuji
1994-02-04	Guangzhou II	H	4 – 1	Hu Zhijun, Li Wei, Zhang Bing, Isamu Tsuji
1994-02-06	China U20	H	2 – 1	Hu Zhijun, Peng Jinbo
1994-02-11	(Brazil) America	H	1 – 0	Li Yong
1994-02-16	Denmark	H	0 – 2	
1994-02-27	(Japan) Yokohama Marinos	H	0 – 1	
1994-03-02	(Portugal) Macau	A	1 – 0	Feng Feng
1994-05-12	(Hong Kong) Instant-Dict	H	2 – 1	
1994-05-18	(Brazil) Goianésia	H	1 – 0	Wen Zhijun
1994-05-27	Guangzhou II	H	3 – 1	
1994-09-23	Shenzhen	A	5 – 2	
1994-09-25	Guangdong Hongyuan	N	1 – 3	
1994-10-01	Guangdong Hongyuan	N	2 – 1	Huang Qineng, Isamu Tsuji
1994-10-11	Singapore	H	2 – 2; 4 – 6 PSO	
1994-10-13	(Hong Kong) Happy Valley	H	4 – 2	

=== Jia-A League ===
17 April 1994	Shandong Taishan	1 – 0	Guangzhou Apollo	Jinan
	Su Maozhen 78'			Stadium: Shandong Stadium

24 April 1994	Jiangsu Maint	0 – 0	Guangzhou Apollo	Nanjing
				Stadium: Wutaishan Stadium

1 May 1994	Guangzhou Apollo	3 – 1	Guangdong Hongyuan	Guangzhou
	Hu Zhijun 15', 86'; Mai Chao 25'		Yu Weiteng 22'	Stadium: Yuexiushan Stadium

8 May 1994	Guangzhou Apollo	2 – 5	Shanghai Shenhua	Guangzhou
	Hu Zhijun 64', 88'		Li Xiao 41'; Fan Zhiyi 53', 60'; Nakhratov 59', 71'	Stadium: Yuexiushan Stadium

5 June 1994	Dalian Wanda	2 – 1	Guangzhou Apollo	Dalian
	Zhao Lin 21'; Liu Zhongchang 43'		Hu Zhijun 59'	Stadium: Dalian People's Stadium

12 June 1994	Sichuan Quanxing	0 – 0	Guangzhou Apollo	Chengdu
				Stadium: Chengdu Sports Centre

19 June 1994	Guangzhou Apollo	1 – 0	Jilin Samsung	Guangzhou
	Hu Zhijun 65'			Stadium: Yuexiushan Stadium

26 June 1994	Shenyang Liuyao	1 – 1	Guangzhou Apollo	Shenyang
	Han Zhenyuan 59'		Peng Weiguo 21'

3 July 1994	Guangzhou Apollo	3 – 2	Beijing Guoan	Guangzhou
	Hu Zhijun 10', 90'; Peng Jinbo 80'		Zhou Ning 3'; Cao Xiandong 70'	Stadium: Yuexiushan Stadium

10 July 1994	Guangzhou Apollo	1 – 0	Bayi	Guangzhou
	Zhu Weizhuo 57'			Stadium: Yuexiushan Stadium

17 July 1994	Liaoning Yuandong	5 – 0	Guangzhou Apollo	Shenyang
	Qu Shengqing 15', 49'; Fu Bo 26'; Li Bing 62'; Zhuang Yi 83'

24 July 1994	Guangzhou Apollo	3 – 1	Shandong Taishan	Guangzhou
	Mai Chao 23'; Peng Changying 77'; Luo Wensheng 90'		Lin Xuebin 76'	Stadium: Yuexiushan Stadium

31 July 1994	Guangzhou Apollo	2 – 0	Jiangsu Maint	Guangzhou
	Feng Feng 5'; Peng Weiguo 83'			Stadium: Yuexiushan Stadium

7 August 1994	Guangdong Hongyuan	0 – 2	Guangzhou Apollo	Guangzhou
			Mai Chao 80'; Hu Zhijun 87'	Stadium: Guangdong People's Stadium

14 August 1994	Shanghai Shenhua	1 – 6	Guangzhou Apollo	Shanghai
	Fan Zhiyi 13'		Hu Zhijun 15', 27', 63', 83'; Peng Weiguo 53', 88'	Stadium: Hongkou Stadium

21 August 1994	Guangzhou Apollo	3 – 2	Dalian Wanda	Guangzhou
	Peng Weiguo 20'; Hu Zhijun 32'; Peng Changying 76'		Xu Hui 38'; Shi Lei 45'	Stadium: Yuexiushan Stadium

28 August 1994	Guangzhou Apollo	1 – 0	Sichuan Quanxing	Guangzhou
	Peng Weijun 63'			Stadium: Yuexiushan Stadium

4 September 1994	Jilin Samsung	1 – 1	Guangzhou Apollo	Yanji
	Li Shifeng 24'		Feng Feng 2'

23 October 1994	Guangzhou Apollo	3 – 0	Shenyang Liuyao	Guangzhou
	Hu Zhijun 45', 81'; Lü Jianjun ?'			Stadium: Yuexiushan Stadium

30 October 1994	Beijing Guoan	1 – 1	Guangzhou Apollo	Beijing
	Gao Feng 75'		Peng Weiguo 8'	Stadium: Xiannongtan Stadium

6 November 1994	Bayi	1 – 0	Guangzhou Apollo	Taiyuan
	Pan Yi 16'

13 November 1994	Guangzhou Apollo	2 – 3	Liaoning Yuandong	Guangzhou
	Hu Zhijun 65'; Zhu Weizhuo 90'		Yu Ming 6'; Qu Shengqing 12'; Zhuang Yi 32'	Stadium: Yuexiushan Stadium

== League table ==
Pos	Team	Pld	W	D	L	GF	GA	GD	Pts
1	Dalian Wanda	22	14	5	3	43	21	+22	33
2	Guangzhou Apollo	22	11	5	6	36	27	+9	27
3	Shanghai Shenhua	22	10	6	6	36	36	0	26
4	Liaoning Yuandong	22	11	3	8	47	36	+11	25
5	Shandong Taishan	22	10	4	8	22	22	0	24

Source: rsssf.com

Top 5 positions show for brevity; for the full table, see 1994 Chinese Jia-A League
