= 1997 Guangzhou Apollo F.C. season =

Guangzhou Apollo F.C. 1997
- Manager: (China) Chen Yiming (to 13 August) (China) Mai Chao (from 13 August)
- Stadium: Yuexiushan Stadium
- Jia-A League: 8th
- FA Cup: Second Round
- Top goalscorer: League: (China) Peng Weiguo (China) Tan Ende (4); All: (China) Peng Weiguo (China) Tan Ende (Denmark) Riffi Haddaoui (4)
- Average home league attendance: 15,364

The 1997 season is the 44th year in Guangzhou Football Club's existence, their 30th season in the Chinese football league and the 4th season in the professional football league.

== Squad ==
Note: Flags indicate national team as defined under FIFA eligibility rules; some limited exceptions apply. Players may hold more than one non-FIFA nationality.

No.	Pos.	Nation	Player
1	GK	CHN	Dong Guozhi
2	DF	CHN	Huang Qineng
3	DF	CHN	Peng Changying
4	DF	CHN	Chen Yaohua
5	DF	CHN	Peng Jinbo
6	FW	CHN	Lü Jianjun
7	FW	CHN	Hu Zhijun
8	MF	AUS	Robert Markovac (from July)
9	MF	CHN	Wen Zhijun
10	MF	CHN	Peng Weiguo (captain)
11	FW	CHN	Tan Ende
12	DF	CHN	Mao Zhuojun
15	DF	CHN	Huang Haibin

No.	Pos.	Nation	Player
16	DF	CHN	Mai Guangliang
17	MF	CHN	Liang Jianfeng
18	FW	CHN	Zheng Cong
20	MF	CHN	Wen Junwu
21	FW	CHN	Yuan Junhui
22	FW	CHN	Min Jin
23	FW	CHN	Feng Yongxiang
25	GK	CHN	Tian Ye
26	FW	DEN	Riffi Haddaoui (to July)
27	MF	DEN	Kim Rasmussen (to April)
27	FW	NGA	Dominic Iorfa (from April)
29	GK	AUS	Peter Blazincic

== Transfers ==
=== Winter ===
In

No.	Pos.	Nation	Player
1	GK	CHN	Dong Guozhi (from Guangzhou Songri)
9	MF	CHN	Wen Zhijun (loan return from Guangzhou Songri)
22	FW	CHN	Min Jin (from Chengdu Wuniu)
25	GK	CHN	Tian Ye (from Hunan Jinxiang)
26	FW	DEN	Riffi Haddaoui (from (Finland) FinnPa)
27	MF	DEN	Kim Rasmussen (loan from (Denmark) Hvidovre)
29	GK	AUS	Peter Blazincic (from (Australia) West Adelaide SC)
--	MF	CHN	Zhu Weizhuo (loan return from Guangzhou Songri)

Out

No.	Pos.	Nation	Player
1	GK	CHN	Huang Hongtao (Retired)
3	DF	CHN	Shen Rong (to Guangzhou Songri)
5	DF	POR	Paulo (Released)
6	DF	CHN	Li Wei (to Qingdao Hainiu)
9	MF	CHN	Peng Weijun (to Shenzhen Kinspar)
11	MF	CHN	Feng Feng (to Sichuan Quanxing)
15	FW	BRA	Emerson (to (Portugal) Lamego)
17	MF	CHN	Zhu Weizhuo (to Shenzhen Kinspar)
19	MF	CHN	Cai Qinghui (to Foshan Fosti)
21	MF	POR	Gomez (Released)
22	GK	CHN	Li Qingshan (loan return to Jinan Taishan Jiangjun)
25	FW	CHN	Luo Wensheng (to Foshan Fosti)
27	MF	CHN	Feng Minzhi (to Guangzhou Songri)

=== Summer ===
In

No.	Pos.	Nation	Player
8	MF	AUS	Robert Markovac (from (Australia) Sydney United)
27	FW	NGA	Dominic Iorfa (from (Hong Kong) Instant-Dict)

Out

No.	Pos.	Nation	Player
26	FW	DEN	Riffi Haddaoui (to (Denmark) Hvidovre)
27	MF	DEN	Kim Rasmussen (loan return to (Denmark) Hvidovre)

== Match results ==
=== Friendly matches ===
Friendly matches
Date	Opponents	H / A	Result	
1997-04-10	(Hong Kong) Sing Tao	A	6 – 0	Haddaoui(3), Tan Ende(2), Hu Zhijun
1997-09-21	(Hong Kong) Instant-Dict	N	1 – 3	Huang Qineng
1997-09-25	(Hong Kong) South China	N	2 – 1	Mai Guangliang, Tan Ende
1997-10-27	(Hong Kong) Instant-Dict	A	2 – 2	Iorfa, Tan Ende
1997-10-30	(Hong Kong) South China	A	1 – 2	Yuan Junhui

=== Jia-A League ===
16 March 1997	Guangzhou Apollo	1 – 0	Guangdong Hongyuan	Guangzhou
	Tan Ende 5'			Stadium: Yuexiushan Stadium

23 March 1997	Jinan Taishan Jiangjun	0 – 0	Guangzhou Apollo	Jinan
				Stadium: Shandong Stadium

27 March 1997	Bayi	0 – 0	Guangzhou Apollo	Shijiazhuang
				Stadium: Yutong International Sports Center

30 March 1997	Guangzhou Apollo	2 – 1	Qianwei Huandao	Guangzhou
	Rasmussen 71'; Peng Weiguo 77'		Jiang Feng 66'	Stadium: Yuexiushan Stadium

6 April 1997	Tianjin Samsung	0 – 0	Guangzhou Apollo	Tianjin
				Stadium: Minyuan Stadium

29 June 1997	Qingdao Hainiu	2 – 0	Guangzhou Apollo	Qingdao
	Liu Zhaoxu 27'; Siame 75'			Stadium: Qingdao City First Stadium

6 July 1997	Guangzhou Apollo	1 – 1	Dalian Wanda	Guangzhou
	Iorfa 4'		Zhang Enhua 31'	Stadium: Yuexiushan Stadium

10 July 1997	Guangzhou Apollo	0 – 3	Beijing Guoan	Guangzhou
			Inganga 10', 44'; Zhou Ning 72'	Stadium: Yuexiushan Stadium

13 July 1997	Shanghai Shenhua	0 – 0	Guangzhou Apollo	Shanghai
				Stadium: Hongkou Stadium

20 July 1997	Yanbian Aodong	0 – 0	Guangzhou Apollo	Yanji
				Stadium: Yanji People's Stadium

24 July 1997	Guangzhou Apollo	0 – 3	Sichuan Quanxing	Guangzhou
			Li Bing 13'; Liu Bin 34'; Yao Xia 71'	Stadium: Yuexiushan Stadium

27 July 1997	Guangdong Hongyuan	1 – 0	Guangzhou Apollo	Guangzhou
	Brennan 18'			Stadium: Guangdong Provincial People's Stadium

3 August 1997	Guangzhou Apollo	0 – 1	Jinan Taishan Jiangjun	Guangzhou
			Su Maozhen 64'	Stadium: Yuexiushan Stadium

16 November 1997	Guangzhou Apollo	3 – 0	Bayi	Guangzhou
	Peng Weiguo 28'; Tan Ende 61'; Lü Jianjun 69'			Stadium: Yuexiushan Stadium

20 November 1997	Qianwei Huandao	3 – 0	Guangzhou Apollo	Chongqing
	Gao Feng 38'; Huang Chuanhong 57'; Gonzales 66'			Stadium: Datianwan Stadium

23 November 1997	Guangzhou Apollo	0 – 0	Tianjin Samsung	Guangzhou
				Stadium: Yuexiushan Stadium

30 November 1997	Guangzhou Apollo	3 – 0	Qingdao Hainiu	Guangzhou
	Peng Weiguo 2', 6'; Tan Ende 30'			Stadium: Yuexiushan Stadium

4 December 1997	Dalian Wanda	2 – 0	Guangzhou Apollo	Dalian
	Wang Tao 30'; Ma Zhuojun 43'			Stadium: Jinzhou Stadium

7 December 1997	Beijing Guoan	1 – 1	Guangzhou Apollo	Beijing
	Olivas 24'		Hu Zhijun 10'	Stadium: Workers Stadium

14 December 1997	Guangzhou Apollo	0 – 0	Shanghai Shenhua	Guangzhou
				Stadium: Yuexiushan Stadium

18 December 1997	Guangzhou Apollo	2 – 1	Yanbian Aodong	Guangzhou
	Hu Zhijun 4'; Tan Ende 59'		Gao Zhongxun 90'	Stadium: Yuexiushan Stadium

21 December 1997	Sichuan Quanxing	1 – 1	Guangzhou Apollo	Chengdu
	Yao Xia 24'		Hu Zhijun 8'	Stadium: Chengdu Sports Centre

=== FA Cup ===
20 April 1997 First Round	Tianjin Vanke	1 – 1	Guangzhou Apollo	Tianjin
	Liu Xiangwei		Haddaoui	Stadium: Minyuan Stadium

27 April 1997 First Round	Guangzhou Apollo	4 – 0	Tianjin Vanke	Nanhai, Foshan
	Iorfa 47'; Feng Yongxiang 81'; Haddaoui 83', 89'			Stadium: Nanhai Stadium

10 May 1997 Second Round	Guangzhou Apollo	1 – 2	Shanghai Shenhua	Nanhai, Foshan
	Haddaoui 20' (pen.)		Xie Hui 3'; Qi Hong 67'	Stadium: Nanhai Stadium

18 May 1997 Second Round	Shanghai Shenhua	1 – 1	Guangzhou Apollo	Shanghai
			Wen Junwu	Stadium: Hongkou Stadium
