= 1996 Guangzhou Apollo F.C. season =

Guangzhou Apollo F.C. 1996
- Manager: (China) Xie Zhiguang (to 17 April) (China) Xian Dixiong (from 18 April)
- Stadium: Yuexiushan Stadium
- Jia-A League: 7th
- FA Cup: Second Round
- Top goalscorer: League: (China) Hu Zhijun (9); All: (China) Hu Zhijun (9)
- Average home league attendance: 13,091

The 1996 season is the 43rd year in Guangzhou Football Club's existence, their 29th season in the Chinese football league and the 3rd season in the professional football league.

== Squad ==
Note: Flags indicate national team as defined under FIFA eligibility rules; some limited exceptions apply. Players may hold more than one non-FIFA nationality.

No.	Pos.	Nation	Player
1	GK	(China) CHN	Huang Hongtao
2	DF	(China) CHN	Peng Changying
3	DF	(China) CHN	Shen Rong
4	DF	(China) CHN	Chen Yaohua
5	MF	(Portugal) POR	Paulo
6	DF	(China) CHN	Li Wei
7	FW	(China) CHN	Hu Zhijun
8	FW	(China) CHN	Lü Jianjun
9	MF	(China) CHN	Peng Weijun
10	MF	(China) CHN	Peng Weiguo (captain)
11	MF	(China) CHN	Feng Feng
12	DF	(China) CHN	Peng Jinbo
13	DF	(China) CHN	Huang Qineng

No.	Pos.	Nation	Player
14	DF	(China) CHN	Mai Guangliang
15	FW	(Brazil) BRA	Emerson
16	MF	(China) CHN	Wen Zhijun (to July)
17	MF	(China) CHN	Zhu Weizhuo (to June)
18	FW	(China) CHN	Tan Ende
19	MF	(China) CHN	Cai Qinghui
20	DF	(Federal Republic of Yugoslavia) YUG	Vojislav Gligorijević (to July)
21	MF	(Portugal) POR	Gomez
22	GK	(China) CHN	Li Qingshan
23	DF	(China) CHN	Huang Haibin
25	FW	(China) CHN	Luo Wensheng
26	FW	(China) CHN	Huang Weixiong (to August)
27	MF	(China) CHN	Feng Minzhi

== Transfers ==
=== Winter ===
In

No.	Pos.	Nation	Player
3	DF	(China) CHN	Shen Rong (loan return from Guangzhou Songri)
5	DF	(Portugal) POR	Paulo (from unknown)
6	DF	(China) CHN	Li Wei (loan return from Shenzhen FC)
14	DF	(China) CHN	Mai Guangliang (from Guangzhou Songri)
15	FW	(Brazil) BRA	Emerson (from (Portugal) Esperança Lagos)
19	MF	(China) CHN	Cai Qinghui (loan return from Guangzhou Songri)
20	DF	(Federal Republic of Yugoslavia) YUG	Vojislav Gligorijević ( (Federal Republic of Yugoslavia) FK Dorćol)
21	MF	(Portugal) POR	Gomez (from unknown)
22	GK	(China) CHN	Li Qingshan (loan from Jinan Taishan Jiangjun)
27	MF	(China) CHN	Feng Minzhi (from Guangzhou Songri)

Out

No.	Pos.	Nation	Player
0	GK	(China) CHN	Dong Guozhi (to Guangzhou Songri)
5	MF	(China) CHN	Li Qiang (to Shenyang Haishi)
6	DF	(China) CHN	Li Yong (Retired)
14	MF	(China) CHN	Zhang Bing (to Guangdong Hongyuan)
15	DF	(China) CHN	Mai Chao (Retired)
20	FW	(China) CHN	Huang Weixiong (loan to (Hong Kong) Frankwell)

=== Summer ===
In

No.	Pos.	Nation	Player
25	FW	(China) CHN	Luo Wensheng (loan return from (Hong Kong) Frankwell)
26	FW	(China) CHN	Huang Weixiong (loan return from (Hong Kong) Frankwell)

Out

No.	Pos.	Nation	Player
16	MF	(China) CHN	Wen Zhijun (loan to Guangzhou Songri)
17	MF	(China) CHN	Zhu Weizhuo (loan to Guangzhou Songri)
20	DF	(Federal Republic of Yugoslavia) YUG	Vojislav Gligorijević (to Hunan Laifu)
26	FW	(China) CHN	Huang Weixiong (to Locomotive)

== Match results ==
=== Friendly matches ===
Friendly matches
Date	Opponents	H / A	Result	
1996-02-08	Yanbian Hyundai	N	4 – 3 (PSO)	
1996-02-11	Ukraine	N	1 – 2	
1996-02-23	(Japan) Sanfrecce Hiroshima	N	1 – 1; 4 – 3 (PSO)	Peng Weiguo
1996-02-25	(Japan) Avispa Fukuoka	A	1 – 2	Peng Jinbo
1996-06-05	(Italy) Napoli	H	1 – 4	Feng Feng
1996-07-19	(Romania) Steaua București	H	1 – 1; 3 – 4 (PSO)	Peng Weiguo

=== Jia-A League ===
14 April 1996	Jinan Taishan Jiangjun	0 – 0	Guangzhou Apollo	Jinan
				Stadium: Shandong Stadium

21 April 1996	Shenzhen Fiyta	0 – 0	Guangzhou Apollo	Shenzhen
				Stadium: Shenzhen Stadium

28 April 1996	Guangzhou Apollo	3 – 0	Guangdong Hongyuan	Guangzhou
	Feng Feng 18'; Chen Yaohua 36'; Lü Jianjun 52'			Stadium: Yuexiushan Stadium

5 May 1996	Guangzhou Songri	1 – 4	Guangzhou Apollo	Guangzhou
	Radosavljević 31'		Feng Feng 11'; Peng Changying 61'; Peng Weijun 88'; Tan Ende 89'	Stadium: Tianhe Stadium

12 May 1996	Guangzhou Apollo	3 – 2	Shanghai Shenhua	Guangzhou
	Hu Zhijun 8'; Tan Ende 10'; Peng Weiguo 36'		Xie Hui 30'; Shen Si 79'	Stadium: Yuexiushan Stadium

19 May 1996	Beijing Guoan	1 – 0	Guangzhou Apollo	Beijing
	Xie Feng 29'			Stadium: Workers Stadium

26 May 1996	Bayi	1 – 1	Guangzhou Apollo	Kunming
	Hu Yunfeng 35'		Huang Qineng 52'	Stadium: Kunming Stadium

2 June 1996	Guangzhou Apollo	2 – 0	Yanbian Hyundai	Guangzhou
	Tan Ende 1'; Hu Zhijun 44'			Stadium: Yuexiushan Stadium

9 June 1996	Guangzhou Apollo	2 – 2	Dalian Wanda	Guangzhou
	Paulo 17'; Peng Weiguo 38'		Wei Yimin 65'; Tuhuteru 80'	Stadium: Yuexiushan Stadium

16 June 1996	Sichuan Quanxing	4 – 0	Guangzhou Apollo	Chengdu
	Wei Qun 42'; Cui Biao 51'; Zou Yougen 79'; Marmelo 90'			Stadium: Chengdu Sports Centre

23 June 1996	Guangzhou Apollo	1 – 1	Tianjin Samsung	Guangzhou
	Peng Changying 27'		Huo Jianting 28'	Stadium: Yuexiushan Stadium

11 August 1996	Guangzhou Apollo	3 – 1	Jinan Taishan Jiangjun	Guangzhou
	Hu Zhijun 55', 68', 88'		Su Maozhen 49'	Stadium: Yuexiushan Stadium

18 August 1996	Guangzhou Apollo	1 – 0	Shenzhen Fiyta	Guangzhou
	Mai Guangliang 49'			Stadium: Yuexiushan Stadium

1 September 1996	Guangdong Hongyuan	1 – 1	Guangzhou Apollo	Guangzhou
	Li Bing 8'		Hu Zhijun 12'	Stadium: Guangdong Provincial People's Stadium

8 September 1996	Guangzhou Apollo	1 – 0	Guangzhou Songri	Guangzhou
	Hu Zhijun 45'			Stadium: Yuexiushan Stadium

15 September 1996	Shanghai Shenhua	3 – 0	Guangzhou Apollo	Shanghai
	Baskov 49'; Fan Zhiyi 51'; Zhang Yong 87'			Stadium: Hongkou Stadium

22 September 1996	Guangzhou Apollo	0 – 1	Beijing Guoan	Guangzhou
			Gao Hongbo 28'	Stadium: Yuexiushan Stadium

29 September 1996	Guangzhou Apollo	1 – 2	Bayi	Guangzhou
	Mai Guangliang 60'		Hao Haidong 10'; Hu Yunfeng 13'	Stadium: Yuexiushan Stadium

6 October 1996	Yanbian Hyundai	1 – 1	Guangzhou Apollo	Yanji
	Jin Guangzhu 57'		Peng Weiguo 42'	Stadium: Yanji People's Stadium

13 October 1996	Dalian Wanda	1 – 0	Guangzhou Apollo	Dalian
	Zhang Enhua 54'			Stadium: Jinzhou Stadium

20 October 1996	Guangzhou Apollo	1 – 1	Sichuan Quanxing	Guangzhou
	Hu Zhijun 90'		Peng Xiaofang 26'	Stadium: Yuexiushan Stadium

27 October 1996	Tianjin Samsung	2 – 1	Guangzhou Apollo	Tianjin
	Yu Genwei 76', 88'		Hu Zhijun 90'	Stadium: Minyuan Stadium

=== FA Cup ===
30 June 1996 First Round	Shenzhen Fiyta	1 – 1	Guangzhou Apollo	Shenzhen
			Feng Feng	Stadium: Shenzhen Stadium

3 July 1996 First Round	Guangzhou Apollo	2 – 1 (a.e.t.)	Shenzhen Fiyta	Guangzhou
	Peng Weiguo; Cai Qinghui			Stadium: Yuexiushan Stadium

7 July 1996 Second Round	Guangzhou Apollo	2 – 5	Jinan Taishan Jiangjun	Guangzhou
	Cai Qinghui 69'; Peng Weiguo 78'		Song Yuming 16', 53', 77'; Li Ming 36'; Su Maozhen 49'	Stadium: Yuexiushan Stadium

10 July 1996 Second Round	Jinan Taishan Jiangjun	1 – 0	Guangzhou Apollo	Jinan
	Tang Xiaocheng 23'			Stadium: Shandong Stadium
