= List of Guangzhou F.C. records and statistics =

== Honours ==
All-time honours list including semi-professional period.

=== Club ===
==== Domestic ====
===== Leagues =====
- Chinese Super League

Winners (7): 2011, 2012, 2013, 2014, 2015, 2016, 2017

- Chinese Jia-B League / China League One

Winners (5): 1956, 1958, 1981, 2007, 2010

===== Cups =====
- Chinese FA Cup

Winners (2): 2012, 2016

- Chinese FA Super Cup

Winners (4): 2012, 2016, 2017, 2018

==== International ====
- AFC Champions League

Winners (2): 2013, 2015

- FIFA Club World Cup

Fourth place (2): 2013, 2015

=== Personal ===
Player	Honor	Season
(China) Mai Chao	Player of the Year	1989
(China) Wu Qunli	Player of the Year	1990; 1993
(China) Zhou Sui'an	Coach of the Year	1992
(China) Hu Zhijun	Jia-A League Top Scorer	1994
(Denmark) Riffi Haddaoui	Chinese FA Cup Top Scorer*	1997
(Belarus) Mikalay Ryndzyuk	League One Top Scorer	2005
(Honduras) Luis Ramírez	League One Top Scorer; Chinese Super League Top Scorer*	2007; 2009
(China) Gao Lin	League One Top Scorer	2010
(Brazil) Muriqui	Chinese Football Association Footballer of the Year; Chinese Super League Top Scorer; Chinese FA Cup Top Scorer	2011
(Brazil) Cléo	Chinese FA Super Cup Most Valuable Player	2012
(Paraguay) Lucas Barrios	Chinese FA Cup Most Valuable Player	2012
(Italy) Marcello Lippi	Chinese FA Cup Best Coach	2012
(China) Zheng Zhi	AFC Player of the Year	2013
(Brazil) Elkeson	Chinese Super League Top Scorer	2013
(Brazil) Muriqui	AFC Champions League Top Scorer; AFC Champions League Most Valuable Player; AFC Foreign Player of the Year	2013
(Argentina) Darío Conca	Chinese Football Association Footballer of the Year; Chinese FA Cup Most Valuable Player	2013
(China) Zeng Cheng	Chinese Football Association Goalkeeper of the Year	2013
(Italy) Marcello Lippi	Chinese Football Association Coach of the Year	2013
(Brazil) Elkeson	Chinese Football Association Footballer of the Year; Chinese Super League Top Scorer	2014
(Brazil) Ricardo Goulart	Chinese Football Association Footballer of the Year; AFC Champions League Top Scorer; AFC Champions League Most Valuable Player; AFC Foreign Player of the Year	2015
(China) Zeng Cheng	Chinese Football Association Goalkeeper of the Year	2015
(Brazil) Luiz Felipe Scolari	Chinese Football Association Coach of the Year	2015
(South Korea) Kim Young-gwon	Korea Football Association Footballer of the Year	2015
(Brazil) Ricardo Goulart	Chinese Football Association Footballer of the Year; Chinese Super League Top Scorer	2016
(China) Zeng Cheng	Chinese Football Association Goalkeeper of the Year	2016
(Brazil) Luiz Felipe Scolari	Chinese Football Association Coach of the Year; Chinese FA Cup Best Coach	2016

(* shared)

== Player records ==
=== Appearances ===
- Most appearances in the league: Feng Junyan, 222 games, 2003–14
- Most appearances in all matches: Gao Lin, 304 games, 2010–present
- Most first-tier league appearances: Gao Lin, 190 games, 2011–present

=== Goalscorers ===
- Most goals in all competitions: Gao Lin, 100 goals, 2010–present
- Most goals in first-tier league: Gao Lin, 62 goals, 2011–present
- Most goals in a season: 34 goals, Elkeson in the 2014 season
- Most goals in a match: 4 goals, Hu Zhijun against Shanghai Shenhua, 14 August 1994 and Muriqui against Nanjing Yoyo, 21 July 2010
- Fastest goal: Tan Ende, 10 seconds, against Yanbian Hyundai, 2 June 1996

==== All-time top goalscorers ====
Since 1994 the first professional league season. Correct as of 28 August 2019. Names in bold indicate players currently plays for Guangzhou.

League

Player	Goals	Period
(China) **Gao Lin**	92	2010–present
(Brazil) Ricardo Goulart	71	2015–18
(Brazil) **Elkeson**	66	2013–15, 2019-
(Brazil) Muriqui	56	2010–14, 2017
(Honduras) Luis Ramírez	48	2001, 2007–09
(Brazil) Alan Carvalho	37	2015–18
(China) Hu Zhijun	36	1994–97
(Argentina) Darío Conca	33	2011–13
(Brazil) **Paulinho**	30	2015–17, 2018–present
(China) Xu Liang	29	2007–09

All

Player	Goals	Period
(China) **Gao Lin**	111	2010–present
(Brazil) Ricardo Goulart	103	2015–18
(Brazil) Muriqui	83	2010–14, 2017
(Brazil) **Elkeson**	83	2013–15, 2019-
(Brazil) Alan Carvalho	58	2015–18
(Argentina) Darío Conca	54	2011–13
(Honduras) Luis Ramírez	48	2001, 2007–09
(Brazil) **Paulinho**	42	2015–17, 2018–present
(China) Hu Zhijun	36	1994–97
(China) **Yu Hanchao**	30	2014–present

== Transfers ==
- Record transfer fee paid: signing Jackson Martínez from Atlético Madrid for €42 million, February 2016
- Record transfer fee received: selling Paulinho to FC Barcelona for €40 million, August 2017

== Club records ==
Since 1994 the first professional league season. Correct as of 4 November 2017.

=== Wins ===
- Record home win: 10–0 against Nanjing Yoyo in China League One, 21 July 2010
- Record away win: 6–0 against Shijiazhuang Ever Bright in Chinese Super League, 15 October 2016

=== Defeats ===
- Record home defeat: 2–5 against Shanghai Shenhua in Jia-A League, 8 May 1994
- Record away defeat: 0–6 against Changchun Yatai in Super League, 11 October 2008

=== Streaks ===
- Longest unbeaten streak (league): 44 games (32 wins and 12 draws) during the 2010 League One to 2011 Super League seasons
- Longest home unbeaten run (league): 44 games during 2015 Super League season to 2017 Super League season (29 wins and 15 draws)
- Longest away unbeaten run (league): 23 games (14 wins and 9 draws) during the 2010 League One to 2011 Super League seasons
- Longest streak without a win (league): 12 games (5 draws and 7 defeats) during the 2002 Jia-B League season
- Longest streak without a win at home (league): 7 games (4 draws and 3 defeats) during the 1998 Jia-A League season
- Longest streak without a win away (league): 21 games (11 draws and 10 defeats) during 1996 to 1998 Jia-A League seasons
- Longest winning streak (league): 10 games during the 2017 Super League season
- Longest home winning streak (league): 12 games during the 2011 to 2012 Super League season
- Longest away winning streak (league): 10 games during the 2015 Super League season
- Longest losing streak (league): 6 games during the 1998 Jia-A League season
- Longest home losing streak (league): 3 games during the 1998 Jia-A League season
- Longest away losing streak (league): 7 games during 1999 to 2000 Jia-B League seasons
- Longest drawing streak (league): 6 games during the 2004 League One season
- Longest home drawing streak (league): 3 games during the 2000 Jia-B League season, 2004 League One season, 2009 Super League season and 2015 Super League season
- Longest away drawing streak (league): 4 games during 2000 to 2001 Jia-B League seasons
- Longest scoring run (league): 23 games during the 2010 League One to 2011 Super League season
- Longest scoring run at home (league): 36 games during 2010 League One to 2012 Super League season
- Longest scoring run away (league): 11 games during the 2010 League One to 2011 Super League seasons and during 2013 Super League season
- Longest non-scoring run (league): 6 games during the 1997 Jia-A League season
- Longest non-scoring run at home (league): 3 games during the 1997 Jia-A League season and 1999 Jia-B League season
- Longest non-scoring run away (league): 9 games during the 1997 Jia-A League season
- Longest streak without conceding a goal (league): 4 games during 2001 to 2002 Jia-B League seasons and 2007 League One season
- Longest streak without conceding a goal at home (league): 7 games during 2001 to 2002 Jia-B League seasons
- Longest streak without conceding a goal away (league): 4 games during the 2010 League One season and 2011 Super League season
- Longest streak with conceding goals (league): 9 games during 2001 to 2002 Jia-B League seasons and 2009 Super League season
- Longest streak with conceding goals at home (league): 9 games during the 2006 League One season
- Longest streak with conceding goals away (league): 14 games during 1999 to 2000 Jia-B League seasons

=== Record results in a season ===
- Most wins in a league season: 24 – 2013 Super League seasons
- Most draws in a league season: 16 – 2004 League One season
- Most draws in a first-tier league season: 10 – 1997 Jia-A League season, 2008 Super League season and 2009 Super League season
- Most defeats in a league season: 14 – 1998 Jia-A League season
- Fewest wins in a league season: 4 – 1998 Jia-A League season and 2002 Jia-B League season
- Fewest draws in a league season: 3 – 2006 League One season
- Fewest draws in a first-tier league season: 5 – 1994 Jia-A League season and 2013 Super League season
- Fewest defeats in a league season: 1 – 2007 League One season, 2010 League One season and 2013 Super League season
- Fewest defeats in a first-tier league season: 1 – 2013 Super League season, 2015 Super League season

=== Goals ===
- Most league goals scored in a season: 78 – 2013 Super League season
- Fewest league goals scored in a season: 14 – 1997 Jia-A League season
- Most league goals conceded in a season: 42 – 2008 Super League season
- Fewest league goals conceded in a season: 15 – 2007 League One season
- Fewest first-tier league goals conceded in a season: 18 – 2013 Super League season
