= 2002 Guangzhou F.C. season =

Guangzhou F.C. 2002
- Manager: (China) Zhou Suian (to 2 September) (China) (Hong Kong) Wu Qunli (from 2 September)
- Stadium: Yuexiushan Stadium
- Jia-B League: 11th
- FA Cup: First Round

The 2002 season is the 51st year in Guangzhou Football Club's existence, their 37th season in the Chinese football league and the 11th season in the professional football league.

Guangzhou finished 11th in the Jia-B League table.
