= 2004 Guangzhou F.C. season =

Guangzhou F.C. 2004
- Manager: (China) Mai Chao
- Stadium: Yuexiushan Stadium
- China League One: 4th
- FA Cup: First Round

The 2004 season is the 53rd year in Guangzhou Football Club's existence, their 39th season in the Chinese football league and the 13th season in the professional football league.

Guangzhou finished fourth in the China League One table.
