= 2001 Guangzhou F.C. season =

Guangzhou F.C. 2001
- Manager: (China) Liu Kang (to 19 April) (China) Zhou Suian (from 25 July)
- Stadium: Yuexiushan Stadium
- Jia-B League: 4th
- FA Cup: First Round

The 2001 season is the 50th year in Guangzhou Football Club's existence, their 36th season in the Chinese football league and the 10th season in the professional football league.

Guangzhou finished fourth in the Jia-B League table.
