= Tian Ye (footballer, born 1972) =

Chinese footballer

Tian Ye 田野
Personal information
- Date of birth: January 14, 1972 (age 54)
- Place of birth: Changsha, Hunan, China
- Height: 1.92 m (6 ft 3 1/2 in)
- Position: Goalkeeper

Team information
- Current team: Guangzhou Glorious (goalkeeper coach)

Senior career*
Years	Team	Apps	(Gls)
1994–1997	Hunan Laifu		
1999–2002	Guangzhou Apollo		
2003–2006	Zhejiang Greentown		

Managerial career
- 2007–2009: Hangzhou Greentown (goalkeeper coach)
- 2010: Guangzhou Evergrande (goalkeeper coach)
- 2011: Guangzhou Youth (goalkeeper coach)
- 2012–2014: Guangdong Sunray Cave (goalkeeper coach)
- 2017: Hainan Seamen (goalkeeper coach)
- 2017–: Guangzhou Glorious (goalkeeper coach)
- * Club domestic league appearances and goals as of 1 Jan 2011

Tian Ye (Chinese: 田野; pinyin: Tián Yě; born January 14, 1972) is a retired Chinese football player who used to play as a goalkeeper. He is now a goalkeeping coach of China Amateur Football League side Guangzhou Glorious.

== Playing career ==
Tian Ye would start his career playing for his hometown club Hunan Laifu in the second tier of the Chinese pyramid. With Hunan he would achieve very little with them and even unfortunately see the club relegated to the third tier at the end of the 1995 league season before the club decided to dissolve at the end of the 1997 league campaign. Tian was eventually allowed to leave the club and would join second tier club Guangzhou Apollo where he would gradually establish himself within the squad for the next several seasons. By the 2003 league season another second tier club Zhejiang Greentown were looking for a reliable goalkeeper and in Tian Ye they would find a goalkeeper who would aid them from being a mid-table club to genuine promotion contenders, eventually achieving its aim when the club came second in the 2006 league season and Tian decided that it was a good time to retire.

== Coaching career ==
After he retired from Zhejiang Greentown the newly appointed manager of the team Zhou Suian asked him to return to the club as a goalkeeper coach, which Tian agreed to on May 18, 2007. Despite being new to coaching and with a squad recently promoted Tian seemed to get the best out of his goalkeepers in his first season where he aided the club to a mid-table finish. His reign as the goalkeeping coach lasted until September 20, 2009, when Zhou Suian was sacked from the management position and as part of his team Tian was also let go. He wouldn't have to wait long before he was offered another coaching position this time with Guangzhou Pharmaceutical on December 20, 2009.
