= Tian Ye =

Tian Ye may refer to:

- Tian Ye (mathematician) (born c. 1971), Chinese mathematician
- Tian Ye (footballer, born 1972), Chinese footballer
- Tian Ye (footballer, born 1978), Chinese footballer
- Tian Ye (skier) (born 1982), Chinese cross-country skier and biathlete
