= Anatoli Davydov =

Russian footballer and coach

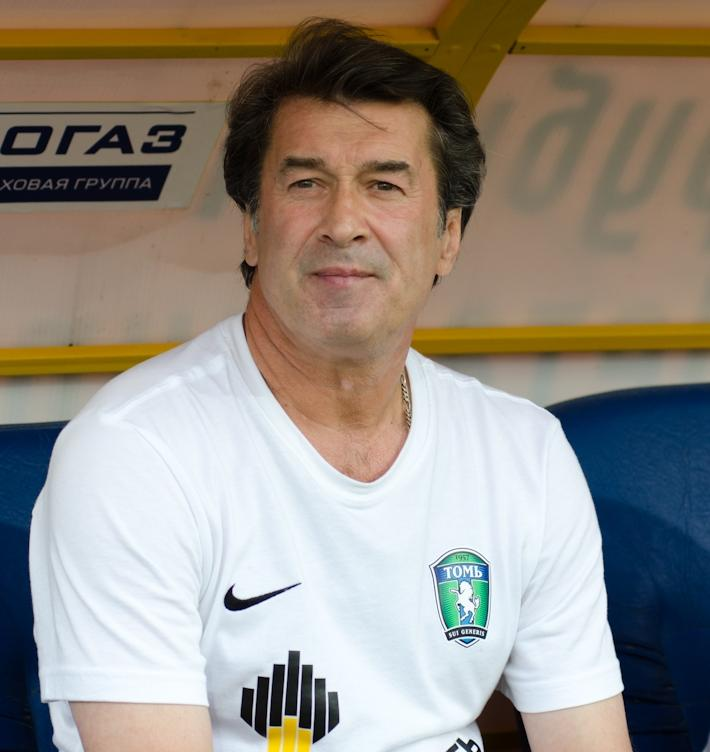
- Davydov with Tom in 2013

Personal information
- Full name: Anatoli Viktorovich Davydov
- Date of birth: 13 November 1953 (age 72)
- Place of birth: Tula, Russian SFSR, Soviet Union
- Height: 1.75 m (5 ft 9 in)
- Positions: Defender; midfielder

Team information
- Current team: Zenit St. Petersburg (academy director)

Youth career
- Torpedo Tula

Senior career*
Years	Team	Apps	(Gls)
1971–1975	Mashinostroitel Tula		
1975–1988	Zenit Leningrad	370	(10)
1989	Torpedo Tolyatti	32	(2)
1989	Krylia Sovetov Kuybyshev	3	(0)
1990	Ponnistus		(3)
1991	Lokomotiv St. Petersburg (amateur)		
1992–1995	Ponnistus	80	(2)
1996	Foshan Fosti		(1)
1997	Zenit St. Petersburg	15	(0)

Managerial career
- 1995: Ponnistus
- 1997–1998: Zenit St. Petersburg (assistant)
- 1998–2000: Zenit St. Petersburg
- 2000: Zenit-2 St. Petersburg (assistant)
- 2001: Zenit St. Petersburg (reserves)
- 2002–2005: Metallurg Lipetsk
- 2005–2006: Sibir Novosibirsk
- 2007: Tekstilshchik-Telekom Ivanovo
- 2008–2009: Zenit St. Petersburg (reserves)
- 2009: Zenit St. Petersburg
- 2010–2013: Zenit St. Petersburg (reserves)
- 2013: Tom Tomsk
- 2017: Zenit-2 Saint Petersburg
- 2017–: Zenit St. Petersburg (academy director)
- * Club domestic league appearances and goals

Anatoli Viktorovich Davydov (Russian: Анатолий Викторович Давыдов; born 13 November 1953) is a Russian professional football coach and a former player. He is the director of the academy for Zenit St. Petersburg.

== Career ==
Davydov made his professional debut in the Soviet Second League in 1971 for Metallurg Tula. He played two games in the UEFA Cup 1987–88 for Zenit Leningrad, the former name of Zenit Saint Petersburg. Davydov was one of the most respected and influential players during Zenit's golden era in the 1980s, and continued to play top-level competitive football until the record age of 43, then becoming a Zenit's coach. He also holds the club record for the most first team appearances - 454 official games, 53 games in Soviet Cup.

Davydov played for Chinese side Foshan Fosti in 1996. He hold the record for being the oldest person to have played in a professional Chinese football match aged 42 years and 348 days, as well as the oldest person to have scored in a professional Chinese football match aged 42 years and 292 days before 2018 when Zhuang Yi broke his records.

== Personal life ==
His son Dmitri Davydov is a professional footballer.

== Honours ==
=== Player ===
Zenit Leningrad

- Soviet Top League: 1984
- Soviet Super Cup: 1985

=== Manager ===
Zenit Saint Petersburg

- Russian Cup: 1998–99
