= Riffi Haddaoui =

Danish footballer (born 1971)

Personal information
- Full name: Karim Ben Haddaoui
- Date of birth: 24 March 1971 (age 55)
- Position: Forward

Senior career*
Years	Team	Apps	(Gls)
1991–1994	BK Avarta		
1994–1996	B.93		
1996	Torquay United F.C.		
1996	FinnPa		
1997	Guangzhou Apollo		
1998	PK-35		
1997–1998	Hvidovre IF		
- * Club domestic league appearances and goals

Riffi Haddaoui (born 24 March 1971) is a Danish former football player. He played for a number of Danish clubs, most notably Boldklubben 1893 (B 93) in the Danish Superliga, as well as a number of foreign clubs (Sweden: Kiruna FF, England: Torquay United, Finland: Finnpa, China: Guangzhou Apollo, Norway: SK Gjøvik-Lyn).

== Playing career ==
Haddaoui started his career playing for Danish 1st Division side Avarta, where he attracted the attention of Danish Superliga clubs FC Copenhagen and Lyngby FC. He was loaned out from Avarta to FC Copenhagen's 1993 UEFA Intertoto Cup campaign and Lyngby's 1994 UEFA Intertoto Cup campaign but he ended up permanently joining rival 1st Division club B 93 in September 1994. He had a few training sessions with Scottish First Division side Airdrie in December 1995, but could not agree personally on terms, and he eventually rejoined Avarta in the 1st Division. In March 1996, Haddaoui joined English 3rd Division club Torquay United on loan. He made two appearances as a substitute in his month at the club, before moving to Finnish club FinnPa for the rest of the season.

After a successful season in Finland, where Haddaoui finished as the league's second highest goalscorer, he moved to Chinese Jia-A League side Guangzhou Apollo on a 10-month contract in February 1997. He returned to Denmark in August 1997, following reports of cultural shock and poor living from Haddaoui and Danish teammate Kim Rasmussen. Haddaoui joined Hvidovre IF in the Danish 1st Division and after making 10 goals, he joined the Norwegian Club Gjøvik Lyn. He then moved back to B 93, who had won promotion to the Danish Superliga, and Haddaoui scored a single goal in the 1998-99 Superliga season. His single goal was not enough, as B 93 were relegated following their single season in the Superliga. In the same season, he won the topscorer prize in the Danish indoor championship for superleague clubs called BT cup.

Haddaoui joined Copenhagen rivals HIK in the 1st Division in 1999 and played for 2 1/2 seasons, making an impressive 48 goals. He was still playing part-time for HIK in the Danish 2nd Division in the 2001–02 season, while working as a web consultant for webmagazine Ingeniøren. Riffi, since 2011, is the founder of VI Elsker 90'erne, a big festival caravan in 12 cities in Denmark and Sweden.
