= Wei Yimin =

Chinese footballer

Wei Yimin 魏意民
Personal information
- Full name: Wei Yimin
- Date of birth: 10 July 1971 (age 55)
- Place of birth: Dalian, Liaoning, China
- Height: 1.78 m (5 ft 10 in)
- Position: Forward

Senior career*
Years	Team	Apps	(Gls)
1994–1998	Dalian Wanda	91	(18)
1999	Guangzhou Matsunichi	25	(6)
2000	Dalian Shide	16	(1)
2001	Bayi Football Team	19	(5)
2002	Shaanxi Guoli	17	(1)
- * Club domestic league appearances and goals

Wei Yimin (Chinese: 魏意民; pinyin: Wèi Yì Mín; born 10 July 1971) is a retired Chinese football player.

== Club career ==
Wei Yimin began his career in Dalian Wanda FC in 1994, and scored Dalian Wanda FC's first goal in professional football history. He won several Chinese Jia-A League titles, but was moved to substitution after the team signed Hao Haidong. He transferred several times, before retiring in 2003.

== After retirement ==
Wei Yimin moved into aquaculture business after his retirement, cultivating sea cucumber in Changxing Island with a few former teammates, including Han Wenhai.

In 2016, Wei Yimin took part in the Jia-A League Star Tournament, representing Dalian Football Team.

On 8 February 2017, Dalian Transcendence announced that Wei Yimin will join the club as their chairman in 2017.

== Honours ==
Dalian Wanda FC

- Chinese Jia-A League: 1994, 1996, 1997, 1998
- Chinese Super Cup: 1997
