= Serhiy Surelo =

Ukrainian footballer

Personal information
- Full name: Serhiy Hryhorovych Surelo
- Date of birth: 30 January 1971 (age 55)
- Place of birth: Kiev, Ukrainian SSR
- Height: 1.80 m (5 ft 11 in)
- Positions: Defender; midfielder

Youth career
- FC Dynamo Kyiv

Senior career*
Years	Team	Apps	(Gls)
1989	FC Dynamo Kyiv	0	(0)
1989	PFC Nyva Vinnytsia	12	(0)
1990–1991	FC Iskra Smolensk	53	(0)
1992	FC Dynamo-Gazovik Tyumen	7	(0)
1992	PFC Nyva Vinnytsia	1	(0)
1993	CSK ZSU Kyiv	9	(0)
1994	Shenyang Liuyao		
1994	FC Nyva Ternopil	3	(0)
1995	Shenyang Liuyao		
- * Club domestic league appearances and goals

Serhiy Hryhorovych Surelo (Ukrainian: Сергій Григорович Сурело; born 30 January 1971) is a former Ukrainian football player.
