= Zhuang Yi =

Chinese footballer and businessman

Zhuang Yi 庄毅
Personal information
- Date of birth: 11 July 1973 (age 53)
- Place of birth: Shenyang, Liaoning, China
- Height: 1.75 m (5 ft 9 in)
- Position: Forward

Team information
- Current team: Liaoning Tieren

Senior career*
Years	Team	Apps	(Gls)
1994–1997	Liaoning FC		
1998	Qingdao Hainiu	24	(4)
1999	Beijing Guoan	8	(0)
2000	Shenyang Haishi	0	(0)
2016–	Liaoning Tieren	2	(1)

International career^{‡}
1995	China	2	(0)
Medal record
Men's football
Representing China
East Asian Games
Bronze medal – third place	1993 Shanghai	Football
- * Club domestic league appearances and goals as of 31 December 2020 ‡ National team caps and goals as of 3 June 2018

Zhuang Yi (Chinese: 庄毅; pinyin: Zhuāng Yì; born 11 July 1973) is a Chinese footballer and businessman who currently the owner and former player of Chinese Super League team Liaoning Tieren. He holds the record of the oldest player and scorer of Chinese professional league.

== Club career ==
Zhuang Yi started his professional football career in 1994 when Chinese Jia-A League turned to professional league. He was the second top scorer of the league in 1994 season, scoring 12 goals in 18 appearances and won Chinese Football Association Young Player of the Year at the end of 1994. He played in the second tier between 1996 and 1997 following Liaoning FC's relegation. He transferred to Chinese Jia-A League side Qingdao Hainiu in 1998. Zhuang transferred to fellow Jia-A League side Beijing Guoan in January 1999 with a fee of ¥2.28 million. In June 1999, he suffered a rupture of achilles tendon in his left leg in a friendly match against LG Cheetahs, ruling him out for the rest of the season.

In January 2000, Zhuang joined his hometown club Shenyang Haishi with a fee of ¥600,000. However, his transfer deal was completely related to his acquisition of Liaoning Youth, which included many promising players such as Zheng Zhi and Xu Liang. He didn't appear for the club in the 2000 season. When he lost his lawsuit and lost the control of Liaoning Youth in November 2000, Zhuang was put in the transfer list by the club. He retired from football in 2001.

== Business career ==
Zhuang established Yixing Industrial Co., Ltd. and Yizhi Football School in 1996. In July 1999, Yixing Industrial Co., Ltd. formed Bohai University Football School (now Liaoning Institute of Science and Engineering) in cooperate with Bohai University. Basing on the football schools, Zhuang registered two football clubs named Jinzhou Zhuangyi F.C. (2001–2004) and Panjin F.C. (2002) to play in the China League Two. Zhuang also purchased 51% ownership of Liaoning Youth on 31 October 1999. However, he failed to take over the club with the opposition of Liaoning Sports School. Zhuang started proceedings against Liaoning Sports School, won in the first instance in July 2000, but lost in the second instance in November 2000. He formed Shenyang Construction Engineering College Urban Construction School in associate with Shenyang Construction Engineering College in July 2000. In 2013, the Urban Construction School separated from Shenyang Construction Engineering College and reformed as Shenyang Urban Construction University. Zhuang established a new football club Shenyang Urban F.C. which was named after the university in 2015.

After Shenyang Urban finished the fourth in the 2015 China Amateur Football League and won promotion to the China League Two, Zhuang registered as a player of the club, wearing the number 9 shirt. However, he didn't appear in the 2016 and 2017 season. On 12 May 2018, he made his return in a 7–1 home win over Baotou Nanjiao, coming on as a substitute in the 67th minute to become the oldest ever player of Chinese professional league at the age of 44 years and 305 days, overtook Anatoli Davydov's previous record of 42 years and 348 days. Zhuang renewed his record on 3 June 2018 when he came on as a substitute in the 78th minute in a 4–0 win against Yanbian Beiguo. He scored a penalty in the match, making him the oldest scorer in the Chinese professional league at the age of 44 years and 327 days.

== International career ==
Zhuang earned two caps for China in 1995. On 19 February 1995, he made his debut for China in a 0–0 draw against South Korea in the 1995 Dynasty Cup. He played another match in the Dynasty Cup on 23 February, in a 2–1 loss to Japan.

== Career statistics ==
=== Club statistics ===
As of 31 December 2020.

Club	Season	League			National Cup		Continental		Other		Total	
Club	Season	Division	Apps	Goals	Apps	Goals	Apps	Goals	Apps	Goals	Apps	Goals
Liaoning FC	1994	Chinese Jia-A League	18	12	-		-		-		18	12
Liaoning FC	1995	Chinese Jia-A League	22	8			-		-		22	8
Liaoning FC	1996	Chinese Jia-B League					-		-			
Liaoning FC	1997	Chinese Jia-B League					-		-			
Liaoning FC	Total		40	20	0	0	0	0	0	0	40	20
Qingdao Hainiu	1998	Chinese Jia-A League	24	4			-		-		24	4
Beijing Guoan	1999	Chinese Jia-A League	8	0			-		-		8	0
Shenyang Haishi	2000	Chinese Jia-A League	0	0	0	0	-		-		0	0
Shenyang Urban	2016	China League Two	0	0	0	0	-		-		0	0
Shenyang Urban	2017	China League Two	0	0	0	0	-		-		0	0
Shenyang Urban	2018	China League Two	2	1	0	0	-		-		2	1
Shenyang Urban	2019	China League Two	0	0	0	0	-		-		0	0
Shenyang Urban	Total		2	1	0	0	0	0	0	0	2	1
Career total			74	25	0	0	0	0	0	0	74	25

=== International statistics ===
National team
Year	Apps	Goals
1995	2	0
Total	2	0
