= Martin Bourke (footballer) =

Australian rules footballer

Personal information
- Full name: Martin Bourke
- Born: 28 May 1936
- Original teams: St Joseph's, Geelong
- Height: 185 cm (6 ft 1 in)
- Weight: 91 kg (201 lb)

Playing career^{1}
Years	Club	Games (Goals)
1957, 1960	Geelong	5 (0)
- ^{1} Playing statistics correct to the end of 1960.

Martin Bourke (born 28 May 1936) is a former Australian rules footballer who played with Geelong in the Victorian Football League (VFL).
