= Isamu Tsuji =

Japanese footballer

Personal information
- Date of birth: December 29, 1973 (age 52)
- Place of birth: Chiba, Japan
- Height: 1.71 m (5 ft 7 in)
- Position: Striker

Youth career
- Mitsubishi Motors F.C.
- 1993: Guangzhou Apollo

Senior career*
Years	Team	Apps	(Gls)
1994–1995	Guangzhou Apollo	4	(0)
1995	→ Frankwell	5	(0)
- * Club domestic league appearances and goals

Isamu Tsuji (辻 勇, Tsuji Isamu; born December 29, 1973) is a retired Japanese football player. He was the first foreign player in the history of Guangzhou F.C. and the first Japanese football player in the Chinese professional league. He is now a businessman.

== Career ==
Isamu Tsuji started his football career in Mitsubishi Motors F.C. youth team, but he found it difficult to become a professional footballer in Japan. He moved to Guangzhou Apollo of China in 1993 along with his teammate Yoshinori Hiroshima and Kang Chou-Su at the recommendation of the former Mitsubishi Motors youth team coach Zhao Dayu, whose mother team was Guangzhou Apollo.

Tsuji's dream came true after one year's hard training. In 1994, he became a professional footballer and participated in the Chinese Jia-A League as a striker of Guangzhou Apollo. It wasn't a successful season for Tsuji, because Guangzhou Apollo had a talented striker Hu Zhijun, 1994 Chinese Football Association golden boot awardee. Tsuji only played 4 matches (33 minutes in total) and didn't score a goal

Tsuji was then loaned to Hong Kong First Division League side Frankwell. In August 1995, he decided to retire and returned to Japan.

== After retirement ==
Tsuji became a businessman after retirement. He was forgotten by Chinese football fans until 2007, when he returned to Guangzhou for personal reasons. Soccer Night, which airs on CCTV and is the most popular football program in China, contacted him and then told the story of his career with the Chinese Jia-A League. He is now well known as the first Japanese player in the Chinese professional football league.
