= Hu Yunfeng =

Chinese footballer and manager

Hu Yunfeng 胡云峰
Personal information
- Date of birth: March 18, 1973 (age 53)
- Place of birth: Shanghai, China
- Position: Striker

Senior career*
Years	Team	Apps	(Gls)
1994–2000	Bayi Football Team		
2001–2003	Shenyang Ginde F.C.		
2004–2007	Nanjing Yoyo F.C.		

International career^{‡}
1998–2000	China	9	(0)

Managerial career
- 2005–2009: Nanjing Yoyo F.C.
- * Club domestic league appearances and goals as of January 2, 2011 ‡ National team caps and goals as of January 2, 2011

Hu Yunfeng (Chinese: 胡云峰; born March 18, 1973) is a Chinese football manager and a former Chinese international association football player.

== Club career ==
Hu Yunfeng was born in Shanghai, China and played for the Shanghai Xuhui District football team before being picked up by top tier Chinese football club Bayi Football Team's youth team. With them he would graduate to their senior team during the 1994 league season and make eight appearances within his first season. The following season would see him become an integral member of the team where he would strike up a partnership with Hao Haidong that would see the club finish ninth and just above relegation. In the 1996 league season his goal scoring partnership with Hao Haidong would see the club drastically improve and finish third within the league, however this saw significant interest for Hao Haidong signature who decided to leave the club leaving Hu Yunfeng to get the goals for Bayi, which he continued until the 1998 league season when saw the club finish thirteenth and in the relegation zone at the end of the season. While Hu admitted that he would be willing to leave the club to return to his home town of Shanghai he decided to stay with Bayi to help fight for promotion, which was achieved at the end of the 2000 league season. Despite Bayi's promotion Hu's desire to leave the club for a move back to Shanghai became apparent once again and Bayi were willing to let Hu leave the club, but sold him to Shenyang Ginde F.C. at the beginning of the 2001 league season. He frustratingly joined Shenyang but quickly picked up an injury, which saw him miss much of his first season. Once he returned to action the following season he nevertheless became an integral member of the team and stayed with the club until the end of the 2003 league season to join second tier football club Nanjing Yoyo F.C. While Hu had hoped to return to Shanghai to play out the remainder of his career there were no clubs willing to risk taking on a player who was past his prime except for Nanjing, who Hu admitted he joined because they were close to Shanghai. While his move was uneventful, the club would offer him the managerial position during the 2005 league season and Hu would see significantly less playing time to concentrate on his managerial duties and would eventually retire in the 2007 league season.

== International career ==
Hu Yunfeng would be called up to the Chinese senior national football team for the first time by the Head coach Bob Houghton to take part in the 1998 Dynasty Cup and would make his debut on March 1, 1998, against Hong Kong in a 1–0 win. During the tournament he would make his first start on March 7, 1998, in a 2–0 victory against Japan. Once the tournament ended Hu struggled to gain a permanent place within the squad and with Bayi struggling against relegation he would find himself dropped from future Bob Houghton's squads. With the introduction of Bora Milutinović as the new Chinese Head coach Hu was given a revival in his international career after Milutinović included him in one of his first squads against New Zealand on January 14, 2000, in a friendly that China won 1-0. In preparation for the 2002 FIFA World Cup qualifiers Hu was tested out for several further friendlies, however he could not find his goalscoring touch and was eventually dropped by Milutinović.

== Career statistics ==
=== Club ===
Last update: Aug 27, 2010

Season	Team	Country	Division	Apps	Goals
1994	Bayi Football Team	China	1	8	1
1995	Bayi Football Team	China	1	21	7
1996	Bayi Football Team	China	1	21	6
1997	Bayi Football Team	China	1	22	5
1998	Bayi Football Team	China	1	22	6
1999	Bayi Football Team	China	2	?	?
2000	Bayi Football Team	China	2	21	8
2001	Shenyang Ginde F.C.	China	1	16	2
2002	Shenyang Ginde F.C.	China	1	20	5
2003	Shenyang Ginde F.C.	China	1	27	6
2004	Nanjing Yoyo F.C.	China	2	24	7
2005	Nanjing Yoyo F.C.	China	2	21	8
2006	Nanjing Yoyo F.C.	China	2	13	1
2007	Nanjing Yoyo F.C.	China	2	1	1
