= Feng Feng (footballer) =

Chinese footballer and coach

Feng Feng 冯峰
Personal information
- Date of birth: December 22, 1968 (age 57)
- Place of birth: Shunde, Guangdong, China
- Height: 1.78 m (5 ft 10 in)
- Position: Midfielder

Team information
- Current team: Guangdong GZ-Power (head coach)

Youth career
- Bayi Football Team

Senior career*
Years	Team	Apps	(Gls)
–1993	Bayi Football Team		
1994–1996	Guangzhou Apollo	51	(5)
1997–1999	Sichuan Quanxing	39	(0)
2000–2001	Chengdu Wuniu	23	(1)

Managerial career
- 2004–2005: Sheffield United Youth Youth (assistant)
- 2006–2010: Chengdu Blades (assistant)
- 2011: Shenzhen Ruby (assistant)
- 2013–2014: Guangdong Sunray Cave (assistant)
- 2015: Guangzhou R&F (assistant)
- 2016–2017: Guizhou Zhicheng (assistant)
- 2017–2020: Sichuan Longfor (assistant)
- 2021–2022: Shaanxi Chang'an Athletic (team manager)
- 2022–2023: Shaanxi Chang'an Athletic
- 2023–2025: Guangdong GZ-Power (assistant)
- 2025–: Guangdong GZ-Power
- * Club domestic league appearances and goals as of July 18, 2010

Feng Feng (Chinese: 冯峰) (born December 22, 1968) is a Chinese football coach and a former football player.

== Club career ==
Feng Feng would start his football career with the Bayi Football Team before he had the chance to join his hometown team Guangzhou Apollo in 1994. With his new team he would experience full professionalism and his most productive period of his whole career when he was part of the squad that came runners-up in the 1994 league title. After several further seasons without improving upon the runners-up position Feng was allowed to leave for Sichuan Quanxing and then nearing the end of the career he would decide to move to his wife's hometown of Chengdu where he joined second tier club Chengdu Wuniu where he eventually retired.

== Coaching career ==
After he retired Feng would go to the United Kingdom and study in Sheffield to become a coach. When he finished he would gain a position at Sheffield United as an assistant coach of the youth team. When Sheffield United purchased one of Feng's previous clubs Chengdu Wuniu many expected his connections with the team would see him promoted to the Head coach position, however he took over the assistant coach of the renamed Chengdu Blades where he has remained despite seeing several other managers come and go. After a short spell in Shenzhen Ruby, Feng became the assistant coach of China League One side Guangdong Sunray Cave on 3 January 2013.

== Honours ==
As a player

Guangzhou Apollo

- Chinese Jia-A League Runner-up: 1994
