= 1994 Chinese Jia-A League =

Chinese Jia-A League
- Season: 1994
- Champions: Dalian Wanda (1st title)
- Relegated: Shenyang Liuyao; Jiangsu Maint
- Asian Club Championship: Withdrew
- Matches: 132
- Goals: 354 (2.68 per match)
- Top goalscorer: Hu Zhijun (17 goals)
- Biggest home win: Beijing Guoan 6-0 Shenyang Liuyao (Aug 28)
- Biggest away win: Shanghai Shenhua 1-6 Guangzhou Apollo (Aug 14)
- Highest scoring: Liaoning Yuandong 6-3 Sichuan Quanxing (Jul 24)

The 1994 Chinese Jia-A League season, also known as Marlboro Chinese Jia-A League for sponsorship reasons, was the inaugural season of professional association football and the 33rd top-tier overall league season held in China. The league was expanded to twelve teams, started on April 17 and ended on November 13, with Dalian Wanda winning the championship.

== Overview ==
By the start of the 1994 league season, the Chinese Football Association (CFA) had been demanding full professionalism since 1992. This meant that private businesses were allowed to own or sponsor football clubs for the first time. The CFA would also sell the television rights to CCTV for 450,000 Yuan and gain sponsorship for the league from Marlboro. Clubs were awarded with a 700,000 Yuan season appearance fee which saw the average monthly players wages jump up significantly from 100 Dollars to 2000 Dollars.

With better wages, clubs could now transfer professional foreign players, except for Bayi, who because they're part of the People's Liberation Army had to have active military members. The league was also expanded to 12 teams compared to eight from the previous season, while the four teams promoted came from the 1992 Chinese Jia-A League league season because there was no promotion or relegation held in the 1993 Chinese Jia-A League season. By the end of the season, Dalian Wanda won their first ever championship while Shenyang Liuyao and Jiangsu Maint were relegated at the end of the season.

== Name changes ==
With clubs now operating as professional units, they were allowed to gain sponsorship and would often change the clubs names to accommodate the sponsor. Below is a list of the dates on when the clubs officially became professional as well as when they gained their first sponsor and changed their name to accommodate this.

- Dalian football club was reorganized as a professional unit on July 3, 1992 and renamed Dalian Wanda on March 8, 1994.
- Guangdong Province football team football club was reorganized as a professional unit on September 15, 1992 and renamed Guangdong Hongyuan.
- Beijing football team was reorganized as a professional unit on December 31, 1992 and renamed Beijing Guoan.
- Guangzhou City football team was reorganized as a professional unit on January 8, 1993 and renamed Guangzhou Apollo.
- Sichuan Province football team was reorganized as a professional unit on November 8, 1993 and renamed Sichuan Quanxing.
- Shandong Province football team was reorganized as a professional unit on December 2, 1993 and renamed Shandong Taishan on January 29, 1994.
- Shanghai football team was reorganized as a professional unit on December 10, 1993 and renamed Shanghai Shenhua.
- Liaoning Province football team was reorganized as a professional unit on February 26, 1994 and renamed Liaoning Yuandong
- Jiangsu Province football team was reorganized as a professional unit on March 28, 1994 and renamed Jiangsu Maint
- Jilin Province football team was reorganized as a professional unit in 1994 and renamed Jilin Samsung
- Shenyang City football team was reorganized as a professional unit at the end of 1995 and renamed Shenyang Liuyao.

== Personnel ==
Team	Manager
Bayi	
Beijing Guoan	(China) Tang Pengju
Dalian Wanda	(China) Zhang Honggen
Guangdong Hongyuan	(China) He Jinlun
Guangzhou Apollo	(China) Zhou Sui'an
Jiangsu Maint	(China) Liu Pingyu
Jilin Samsung	(China) Li Huen
Liaoning Yuandong	(China) Wang Hongli
Shandong Taishan	(China) Yin Tiesheng
Shanghai Shenhua	(China) Xu Genbao
Shenyang Liuyao	(Ukraine) Serhiy Morozov
Sichuan Quanxing	

=== Managerial changes ===
Club	Outgoing	Manner	When	Incoming
Liaoning Yuandong	(China) Yang Yumin	Resigned	After Round 4	(China) Wang Hongli

== Foreign players ==
As a military-owned team, Bayi were not allowed to sign any foreign players.

Club	Player 1	Player 2	Player 3	Former players
Beijing Guoan				
Dalian Wanda				
Guangdong Hongyuan	(England) Darren Tilley	(England) Ian Docker	(England) Richard Crossley	(England) Craig Allardyce (England) Murray Jones
Guangzhou Apollo	(Japan) Isamu Tsuji			(Scotland) Neil Armour
Jiangsu Maint	(Japan) Satoshi Katsumata	(Kazakhstan) Vitaly Sokolovsky		
Jilin Samsung	(South Korea) Kim Jong-pil	(South Korea) Park Young-soo		
Liaoning Yuandong				
Shandong Taishan				
Shanghai Shenhua	(Russia) Aleksandr Zakharikov	(Russia) Dmitry Kuts	(Russia) Vladimir Nakhratov	
Shenyang Liuyao	(Russia) Aleksandr Alfyorov	(Russia) Yevgeni Dolgov	(Ukraine) Serhiy Surelo	
Sichuan Quanxing				

== League standings ==
Pos	Team	Pld	W	D	L	GF	GA	GD	Pts	Relegation
1	Dalian Wanda	22	14	5	3	43	21	+22	33	
2	Guangzhou Apollo	22	11	5	6	36	27	+9	27	
3	Shanghai Shenhua	22	10	6	6	36	36	0	26	
4	Liaoning Yuandong	22	11	3	8	47	36	+11	25	
5	Shandong Taishan	22	10	4	8	22	22	0	24	
6	Sichuan Quanxing	22	8	7	7	31	24	+7	23	
7	Guangdong Hongyuan	22	8	7	7	28	21	+7	23	
8	Beijing Guoan	22	7	8	7	42	34	+8	22	
9	Bayi	22	6	9	7	15	19	−4	21	
10	Jilin Samsung	22	6	7	9	25	31	−6	19	
11	Shenyang Liuyao	22	1	9	12	16	39	−23	11	Relegated to Jia-B League
12	Jiangsu Maint	22	1	8	13	13	44	−31	10	Relegated to Jia-B League

Source: rsssf.com

== Top scorers ==
Rank	Player	Club	Goals
1	(China) Hu Zhijun	Guangzhou Apollo	17
2	(China) Wang Tao	Dalian Wanda	12
2	(China) Zhuang Yi	Liaoning Yuandong	12
4	(China) Xie Feng	Beijing Guoan	11
5	(China) Gao Feng	Beijing Guoan	10
5	(China) Li Bing	Liaoning Yuandong	10
5	(Russia) Vladimir Nakhratov	Shanghai Shenhua	10
8	(China) Fan Zhiyi	Shanghai Shenhua	9
8	(China) Gao Xu	Dalian Wanda	9
8	(China) Li Xiao	Shanghai Shenhua	9
