= Peng Weijun =

Chinese footballer (born 1973)

Peng Weijun 彭伟军
Personal information
- Date of birth: February 23, 1973 (age 53)
- Place of birth: Guangzhou, Guangdong, China
- Height: 1.68 m (5 ft 6 in)
- Position: Midfielder

Youth career
- Guangzhou Team

Senior career*
Years	Team	Apps	(Gls)
1993–1994	Happy Valley		
1994–1996	Guangzhou Apollo	51	(6)
1997–1998	Shenzhen Jinpeng		
1999–2000	Qingdao Jonoon	45	(7)
2001	Shenyang Ginde	1	(0)
- * Club domestic league appearances and goals as of March 28, 2009

Peng Weijun (Chinese: 彭伟军; born February 23, 1973) is a retired Chinese football player who is the younger brother of former Chinese international Peng Weiguo. In his career, he played for Happy Valley, Guangzhou Apollo, Shenzhen Jinpeng, Qingdao Jonoon and Shenyang Ginde before he retired, where he has since become a businessman.

== Background ==
Peng Weijun is of Hakka ethnicity and his father originates from Jiexi, Guangdong.

== Club career ==
Peng Weijun would follow in his older brother Peng Weiguo's footsteps and started his career with top tier side Guangzhou Apollo. While his brother established himself as vital member of the team, Weijun would only be a squad player and moved to second tier football club Shenzhen Jinpeng to gain more playing time in 1996. He would then be part of the squad that moved to Yunnan as the club changed their name to Yunnan Hongta before he had the chance to join another top tier side in Qingdao Jonoon where in the 2000 league season he scored the fastest goal in Chinese football history against his old club Yunnan Hongta.

== International career ==
He was a member of China Olympic National Team 1994–1995.

Preceded by (Brazil) Marcelo Sergipano (Shanghai Shenhua)	Chinese Football Association EMS Quickest Goal; 2000	Succeeded by (Brazil) Tiago (Shenzhen Pingan)
