= Tan Ende =

Chinese footballer and coach

Tan Ende 谭恩德
Personal information
- Date of birth: August 21, 1971 (age 55)
- Place of birth: Guangzhou, China
- Height: 1.70 m (5 ft 7 in)
- Position: Striker

Senior career*
Years	Team	Apps	(Gls)
1990–1999	Guangzhou Apollo		
2000	Qingdao Jonoon		
2001–2003	Zhejiang Greentown		

Managerial career
- 2004–2007: Hangzhou Sanchao (assistant)
- 2007–2009: Zhejiang Greentown (assistant)
- 2012–2013: Guangzhou Evergrande reserved (assistant)
- 2013: Meizhou Hakka (assistant)
- 2014–2015: Meizhou Hakka
- 2024–2025: Guangzhou Dandelion Alpha
- 2026-: Guangzhou Xingpai
Medal record
Men's football
Representing China
East Asian Games
Bronze medal – third place	1993 Shanghai	Football
- * Club domestic league appearances and goals

Tan Ende (simplified Chinese: 谭恩德; traditional Chinese: 譚恩德; pinyin: Tán Ēndé; born August 21, 1971) is a Chinese football coach and former player.

== Playing career ==
Tan Ende played the majority of his football career for Guangzhou Apollo where he would aid them to two runners-up positions for the league title. He would also see them become a professional football team, however he is often remembered for scoring the fastest goal in Chinese football history against Yanbian FC on June 2, 1996. Unsatisfied with the professionalism in the club he would become alienated within the team and would leave for Qingdao Jonoon before settling at second tier side Zhejiang Lücheng before he retired.

== Managerial career ==
After he retired he would become a trainer for Zhejiang Lücheng's reserve team Hangzhou Sanchao until May 18, 2007 when he was promoted to be a trainer for the senior team. On September 20, 2009 the Head coach Zhou Suian was sacked as manager for the team and Tan Ende would follow him.
