= Peng Weiguo =

Chinese footballer and coach

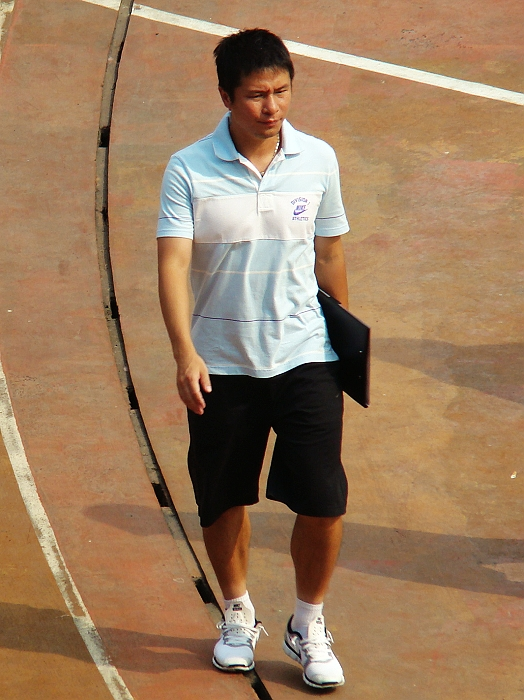

Personal information
- Date of birth: 3 October 1971 (age 55)
- Place of birth: Guangzhou, Guangdong, China
- Height: 1.69 m (5 ft 7 in)
- Position: Midfielder

Senior career*
Years	Team	Apps	(Gls)
1990–1997	Guangzhou Apollo	85	(21)
1998–1999	Chongqing Longxin	25	(6)
2000–2001	Shenzhen Pingan	35	(4)

International career
1992–1997	China	53	(11)

Managerial career
- 2001: Shenzhen Pingan (assistant)
- 2007: Shanghai Stars
- 2008–2009: Hangzhou Greentown (assistant)
- 2009–2013: Guangzhou Evergrande (youth team)
- 2009–2010: Guangzhou Evergrande (caretaker)
- 2011: China U22 (assistant)
- 2011–2013: Guangzhou Evergrande (reserve team)
Medal record
Men's football
Representing China
AFC Asian Cup
Bronze medal – third place	1992 Japan	Team
Asian Games
Silver medal – second place	1994 Hiroshima	Football
- * Club domestic league appearances and goals

Peng Weiguo
- Simplified Chinese: 彭伟国
Transcriptions
Standard Mandarin
- Hanyu Pinyin: Péng Wěiguó
- IPA: [pʰə̌ŋ wèɪ kwǒ]
Yue: Cantonese
- Jyutping: Paang4 Wai5gwok3
- IPA: [pʰaŋ˩ wɐj˩˧ kʷɔk̚˧]

Peng Weiguo (Chinese: 彭伟国; pinyin: Péng Wěiguó; born 3 October 1971) is a Chinese football coach and a former international player.

As a player he represented Guangzhou Apollo, Chongqing Longxin and Shenzhen Pingan while internationally he represented the China national team at the 1992 and 1996 AFC Asian Cup. After retiring he moved into coaching and became the assistant coach at Shenzhen Pingan before gaining his first head coaching position at Shanghai Stars. He has continued with coaching as an assistant with Hangzhou Greentown and China U22 or a reserve team coach with Guangzhou Evergrande.

== Club career ==
Born in Guangzhou, Peng Weiguo is of Hakka ethnicity and his father originates from Jiexi, Guangdong. He and his younger brother Peng Weijun showed a lot of sporting potential and both would join then graduate from the Guangzhou Apollo youth team. After breaking into the Guangzhou Apollo senior team, Weiguo would quickly become an integral member of the team and then rise to prominence during the 1994 league season when he was named as their captain then lead them to a runners-up position as well as personally winning the Golden Ball award. Known for his brutal soccer style he controversially fouled and seriously hurt promising soccer star Zhang Haitao, which ultimately caused Zhang Haitao to retire. Peng Weiguo remained with Guangzhou until the 1997 league season when Chongqing Longxin were willing to pay 2,350,000 Renminbi for him, however despite his high transfer he was unable to live up to expectations and would return to the Guangdong province with Shenzhen Pingan where he was also offered a training position.

== International career ==
Originally part of the Chinese youth team he would make the transition to the senior team when he made his debut against Indonesia on 20 April 1992, in an Asian Cup qualifier that China won 2–0. He would immediately become an integral member of the Chinese team and would play in the 1992 AFC Asian Cup where he aided China to a third-place finish as well as also scoring his first goal against Qatar during the tournament. In the 1994 Asian Games he would continue to aid China to this time a runners-up position, however when it came to the 1996 AFC Asian Cup he was unable to help China improve upon their previous results and China were knocked out during the quarter-finals. Unable to help China qualify for the 1998 FIFA World Cup Peng Weiguo would play his last international game in the final game of qualifying.

== Managerial career ==
Peng Weiguo would leave his training position at Shenzhen Pingan in 2001 and move away from football to start several business ventures. He would return to football in July 2006 when he registered to take a Chinese Soccer association level B training class in management. He would quickly achieve his certificate and on 5 January 2007, he would be offered his first head coach position at the second-tier club Shanghai Stars to replace resigning manager Shen Si, however, he would have a difficult start to his reign and Cao Xiandong was brought into the club as head coach. Peng Weiguo would then move to Hangzhou Greentown on 29 April 2008, as an assistant until 22 September 2009.

On 1 December 2009 top tier football club Guangzhou Pharmaceutical officially announced Peng Weiguo as their caretaker head coach. On 25 March 2010, it was announced that manager Peng had been relieved of his duties, with Korean manager Lee Jang-Soo put in charge. He became the manager of Guangzhou F.C. Youth Team.

On 22 September 2011, Chinese Football Association announced Peng as the assist coach of China U22.

On 21 May 2012, he became the reserve team coach of Guangzhou Evergrande, just a few days after Marcello Lippi took over as the new head coach. Peng announced his resignation on his personal weibo account on 27 May 2013.

== Career statistics ==
No.	Date	Venue	Opponent	Score	Result	Competition
1.	30 January 1996	Mong Kok Stadium, Kowloon, Hong Kong	Macau	1–0	7–1	1996 AFC Asian Cup qualification
2.	30 January 1996	Mong Kok Stadium, Kowloon, Hong Kong	Macau	3–1	7–1	1996 AFC Asian Cup qualification

== Honours ==
=== Player ===
Guangzhou Apollo

- Chinese Jia-A League runner-up: 1994

China

- Asian Games runner-up: 1994
