= Huang Hongtao =

Chinese footballer (born 1970)

Huang Hongtao 黄洪涛
Personal information
- Date of birth: 3 December 1970 (age 55)
- Place of birth: Guangzhou, China
- Height: 1.90 m (6 ft 3 in)
- Position: Goalkeeper

Team information
- Current team: Guangzhou R&F (goalkeeping coach)

Senior career*
Years	Team	Apps	(Gls)
1990–1996	Guangzhou Apollo	61	(0)
1998	Sichuan Quanxing	18	(0)
1999–2003	Guangzhou Apollo		

International career
1992	China PR	1	(0)

Managerial career
- 2001: Guangzhou Youth (assistant)
- 2002: Guangzhou Xiangxue (assistant)
- 2004–2005: Guangzhou Sunray Cave (assistant)
- 2006: Guangzhou Pharmaceutical (goalkeeping coach)
- 2007: Guangzhou Pharmaceutical U19 (assistant)
- 2008–2009: Guangzhou Pharmaceutical U19
- 2009–2010: China U-17 (goalkeeping coach)
- 2010–2014: China U-20 (assistant)
- 2013–: Guangzhou R&F (goalkeeping coach)
- * Club domestic league appearances and goals

Huang Hongtao (Chinese: 黄洪涛; pinyin: Huáng Hóngtāo; Mandarin pronunciation: [xwǎŋ xʊ̌ŋ tʰáʊ]; born 3 December 1970) is a Chinese former international footballer who played as a goalkeeper. Since his retirement he moved into coaching and is currently a goalkeeping coach with Guangzhou R&F.

== Biography ==
Huang Hongtao began his football career with second-tier football club Guangzhou Apollo in the 1990 Chinese league season where he was part of the team that came runners-up and won promotion to the top tier. With Guangzhou in the top tier, Huang had established himself as a regular within the team and was soon called up to the Chinese national team where he made his debut on 20 April 1992 against Indonesia in a 1992 AFC Asian Cup qualification game, which China won 2-0. By 1997 despite being at the peak of his career Huang took time out from football to start his coaching career in the United States. Upon his return, Huang returned to football and joined Sichuan Quanxing in 1998 before he returned to Guangzhou for a brief period before he retired from playing.

After finishing playing Huang soon moved into assistant coaching at Guangzhou where he remained for several seasons until he was appointed as the goalkeeping coach of the Chinese U-17 team in 2009.
