= Huang Qineng =

Chinese footballer (born 1966)

Huang Qineng 黄启能
Personal information
- Full name: Huang Qineng
- Date of birth: 24 May 1966 (age 60)
- Place of birth: Hepu, Guangxi, China
- Height: 1.88 m (6 ft 2 in)
- Position: Centre back

Youth career
- 1982–1985: Beijing Army

Senior career*
Years	Team	Apps	(Gls)
1985–1990	Beijing Army		
1987	→ Bayi (loan)		
1991–1998	Guangzhou Apollo	27	(1)

International career
1988–1989	China B		
1992	China	3	(0)

Managerial career
- 1995: Guangzhou Matsunichi (assistant)
- 2001–2002: Guangzhou FC (assistant)
- * Club domestic league appearances and goals

Huang Qineng (Chinese: 黄启能; pinyin: Huáng Qǐnéng; born 24 May 1966) is a Chinese former association football player.

== Playing career ==
Huang Qineng was scouted by Beijing Army in 1982 and was promoted to the first team in 1985. In 1987, he was loaned to Beijing Army's superior team Bayi for the 1987 Asian Club Championship. Huang transferred to civilian in 1991 and joined Chinese Jia-A League side Guangzhou FC. He was called up to the Chinese national team in 1992 for the 1992 AFC Asian Cup qualification. On 20 April 1992, he made his international debut in a 2–0 win over Indonesia. He played all three matches as China won qualification to the 1992 AFC Asian Cup. When Chinese football league turned professional in 1994, Huang disqualified for playing due to failing in the Chinese Football Association's physical fitness test. He eventually made his professional debut on 12 May 1996 in a 3–2 home win over Shanghai Shenhua. On 26 May 1996, he scored in a 1–1 away draw against Bayi. Huang failed to pass the physical fitness test again in 1998 and retired at the end of the season.
