= Mai Chao =

Chinese footballer and coach

Mai Chao 麦超
Personal information
- Date of birth: March 9, 1964 (age 62)
- Place of birth: Guangzhou, Guangdong, China
- Height: 1.78 m (5 ft 10 in)
- Position: Left-back

Team information
- Current team: Guangzhou Glorious (manager)

Senior career*
Years	Team	Apps	(Gls)
1981–1995	Guangzhou Apollo		

International career
1986–1992	China	49	(16)

Managerial career
- 1997–1998: Guangzhou Apollo
- 2003–2005: Guangzhou FC
- 2008: Shenzhen Xiangxue Eisiti
- 2008–2011: Guangzhou U17
- 2014: Guangdong Sunray Cave
- 2017: Hainan Boying
- 2017–: Guangzhou Glorious
Medal record
Men's football
Representing China
AFC Youth Championship
Silver medal – second place	1982 Bangkok	Team
University Games
Bronze medal – third place	1985 Kobe	Football
- * Club domestic league appearances and goals

Mai Chao
- Simplified Chinese: 麦超
Transcriptions
Standard Mandarin
- Hanyu Pinyin: Mài Chāo
- IPA: [mâɪ ʈʂʰáʊ]
Yue: Cantonese
- Jyutping: Mak6 Ciu1
- IPA: [mɐk̚˨ tsʰiw˥]

Mai Chao (born March 9, 1964) is a Chinese football coach and a former international football player. He spent his whole playing career for Guangzhou Apollo as an attacking left-back. After retiring, he moved into management, where he went on to manage Guangzhou twice as well as Shenzhen Xiangxue Eisiti.

== Playing career ==
Mai Chao was born in Guangzhou, Guangdong. He spent his whole playing career with Guangzhou Apollo as an attacking left-back and saw the team rise through the Chinese pyramid before being called up to the Chinese national team where he made his debut appearance against Italy in friendly on May 11, 1986, in a 2–0 defeat. He became a regular with the team and scored his debut goal against Indonesia on August 25, 1986, in a 3–0 win before being called up to the Football at the 1986 Asian Games and then the 1988 AFC Asian Cup. Unfortunately he was part of the squad that narrowly missed out of reaching the FIFA World Cup after losing the final group game to Qatar in the dying minutes during qualification. Mai ended his international career as the country's top goalscoring defender while also seeing Guangzhou move into full professionalism before he retired.

== Managerial career ==
After retiring Mai moved into training and due to high regard within Guangzhou Apollo he rejoined them in 1997 as their new manager. His time as manager was not successful and he was gone by the end of the 1998 league season, which also saw the club relegated after they finished bottom of the league. Out of management, he would go on to form a youth football school before Guangzhou once again asked for his services. This time he was asked to achieve promotion back into the top tier, however while his second reign was considerably more successful he was unlucky in achieving this goal in his first attempt when he narrowly missed out on promotion through head-to-head results with Henan Construction in the 2003 league season. Despite coming close through the next two seasons, Guangzhou decided to allow Mai to leave, but he didn't have to wait long before he took a position at Shenzhen Xiangxue Eisiti in January 2007 where he later became their head coach on December 14 of the same year during the off season. During this period he took on the training sessions and led the team out at the beginning of the 2008 Chinese Super League before his contract finished, and he left the club.

== Career statistics ==
No.	Date	Venue	Opponent	Score	Result	Competition
1.	23 February 1989	Tianhe Stadium, Guangzhou, China	Bangladesh	2–0	2–0	1990 FIFA World Cup qualification
2.	22 July 1989	Azadi Stadium, Tehran, Iran	Iran	1–3	2–3	1990 FIFA World Cup qualification
3.	12 October 1989	National Stadium, Kallang, Singapore	Saudi Arabia	1–1	2–1	1990 FIFA World Cup qualification
4.	12 October 1989	National Stadium, Kallang, Singapore	Saudi Arabia	2–1	2–1	1990 FIFA World Cup qualification

== Honours ==
=== Player ===
Guangzhou Apollo

- Chinese Jia-A League runner-up: 1992, 1994
- Chinese FA Cup runner-up: 1991
