= Hu Zhijun =

Chinese footballer (born 1970)

Hu Zhijun 胡志军
Personal information
- Date of birth: July 24, 1970 (age 56)
- Place of birth: Guangzhou, Guangdong, China
- Height: 1.74 m (5 ft 9 in)
- Position: Striker

Senior career*
Years	Team	Apps	(Gls)
1990–1997	Guangzhou Apollo	82	(36)
1998–1999	Guangzhou Songri	51	(10)
2000	Shanghai Shenhua	5	(0)
2001–2002	Shanghai Cosco	22	(1)

International career^{‡}
1994	China	6	(2)

Managerial career
- 2004–2005: Guangzhou U-15
- 2006–2007: Guangzhou U-19 (assistant)
- 2007–2008: Dongguan Lanwa (assistant)
- 2008: Dongguan Lanwa
Medal record
Men's football
Representing China
Asian Games
Silver medal – second place	1994 Hiroshima	Football
- * Club domestic league appearances and goals as of March 28, 2009 ‡ National team caps and goals as of March 28, 2009

Hu Zhijun (Chinese: 胡志军; pinyin: Hú Zhìjūn; Mandarin pronunciation: [xǔ ʈʂɻ̩̂ tɕýn]; born July 24, 1970) is a retired Chinese football player. He won the first Golden Boot Award of Chinese professional football league after scoring 17 goals in the 1994 Chinese Jia-A League.

== Club career ==
Hu Zhijun played for Guangzhou Apollo, Guangzhou Songri, Shanghai Shenhua and Shanghai Cosco throughout his professional career. He scored seventeen goals in the Chinese Jia-A League 1994, which made him the first golden boot awardee of Chinese professional football league.

== Career statistics ==
=== International ===
Appearances and goals by national team and year
National team	Year	Apps	Goals
China	1992	1	0
China	1993	–	
China	1994	5	2
Total		6	2

Scores and results list China's goal tally first, score column indicates score after each Hu goal.

List of international goals scored by Hu Zhijun
No.	Date	Venue	Opponent	Score	Result	Competition
1	7 October 1994	Regional Park Stadium, Hiroshima, Japan	Iran	1–0	1–0	1994 Asian Games
2	16 October 1994	Hiroshima Park Stadium, Hiroshima, Japan	Uzbekistan	1–2	2–4	1994 Asian Games

== Honours ==
=== club ===
Guangzhou Apollo

- Chinese Jia-A League Runner-up (1): 1994
- Chinese Football Association Golden Boot awardee(1): 1994

Shanghai Shenhua

- Chinese Jia-A League Runner-up (1): 2000

Shanghai Cosco

- Chinese Jia-B League champions (1): 2001

=== International ===
China national football team

- Asian Games Runner-up (1): 1994
