= Yuexiushan Stadium =

Sports stadium in Guangzhou, China

Coordinates: 23°08′21″N 113°15′39″E

Yuexiushan Stadium 越秀山体育场
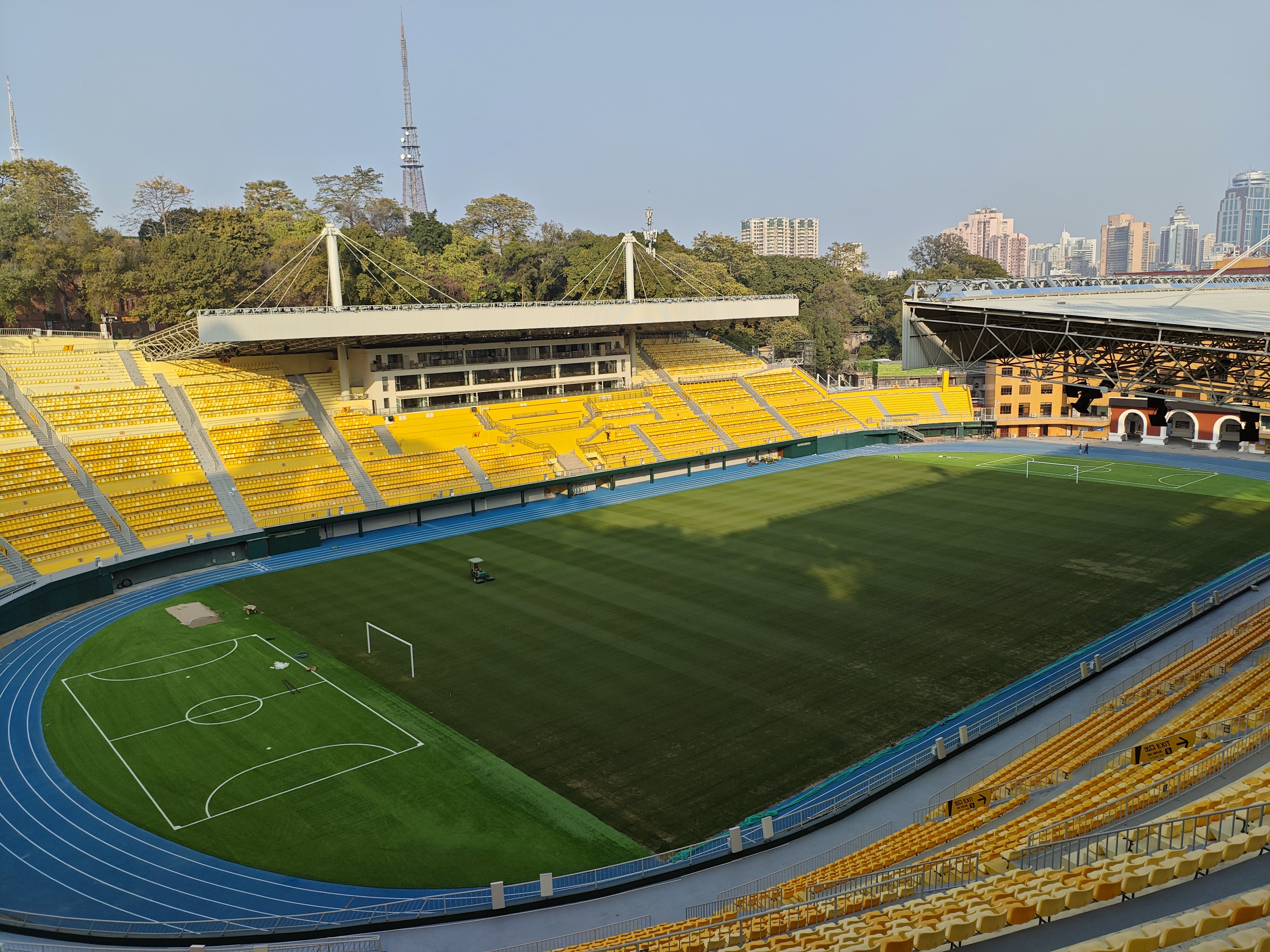
- Yuexiushan Stadium in 2025
- Interactive map of Yuexiushan Stadium 越秀山体育场
- Former names: Yuexiu Mountain Park Sports Ground 越秀山公园运动场
- Location: 34 Yingyuan Road, Guangzhou, Guangdong, China
- Owner: Guangzhou Sports Bureau
- Capacity: 18,000
- Surface: Grass

Construction
- Opened: 1950
- Renovated: 1956, 1977, 1980, 1987, 1997, 2004, 2010, 2012, 2014, 2016, 2024

Tenants
- Guangzhou (1993–1997, 2001–2010, 2023); Guangzhou City (2011–2022); Guangdong GZ-Power (2023, 2025–present)

The Yuexiushan Stadium (simplified Chinese: 越秀山体育场; traditional Chinese: 越秀山體育場; Jyutping: Jyut⁶sau³saan¹ Tai²juk⁶coeng⁴) is a multi-purpose stadium in Guangzhou, Guangdong, China, named after its location at the foot of Yuexiu Hill. It is currently mostly used for football matches and also sometimes for athletics. It is located on 34 Yingyuan Road. The stadium is owned by the Guangzhou Sports Bureau.

The original stadium at the same location opened before 1926. In 1950, it was completely rebuilt with a capacity for 35,000 people. However, following renovation and the installation of fixed seating in 2012, the capacity is now 18,000.

The stadium is best reached by taking Guangzhou Metro Line 2 to Sun Yat-Sen Memorial Hall Station.

== History ==
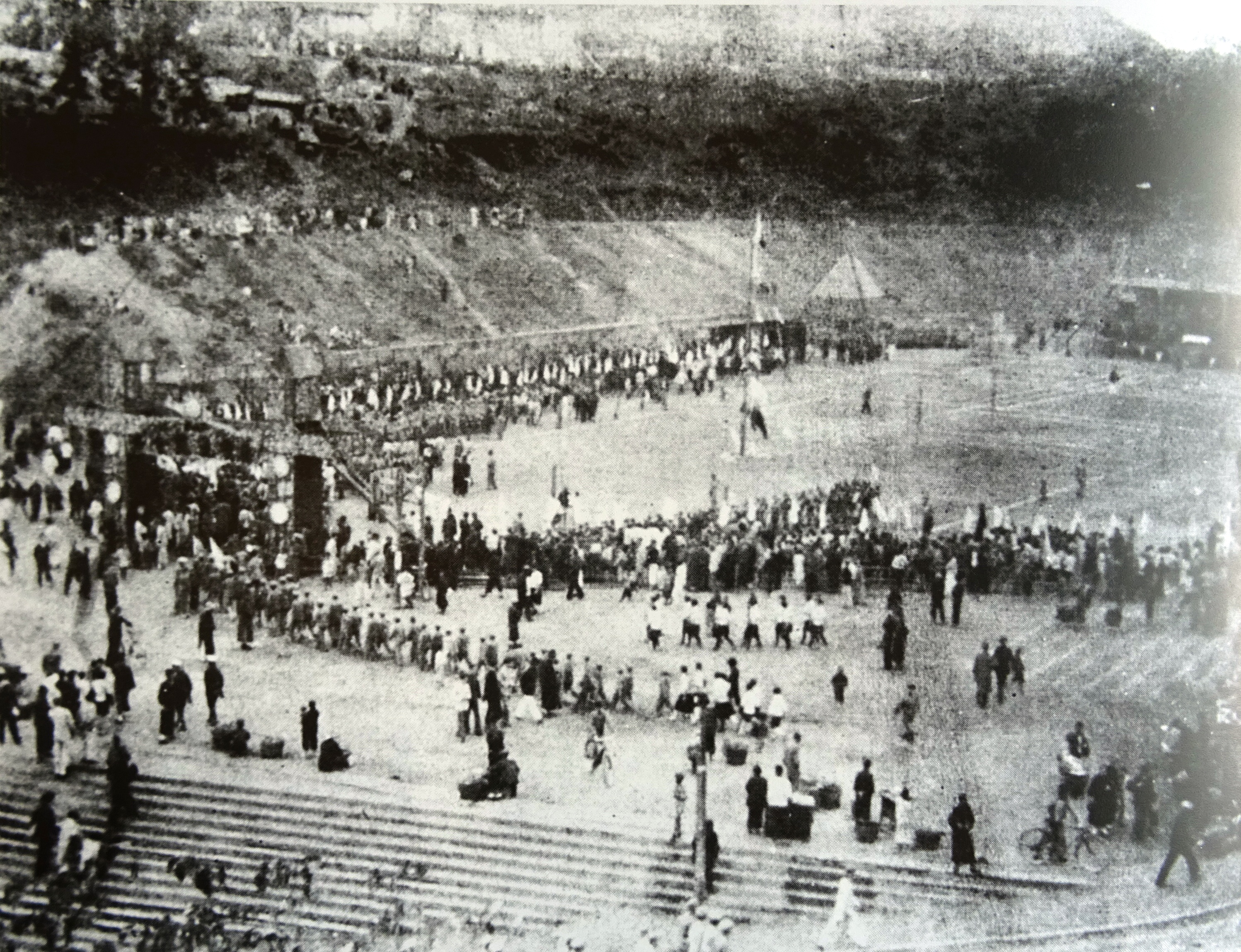
Yut Sau Shan Public Stadium in the early 1930s

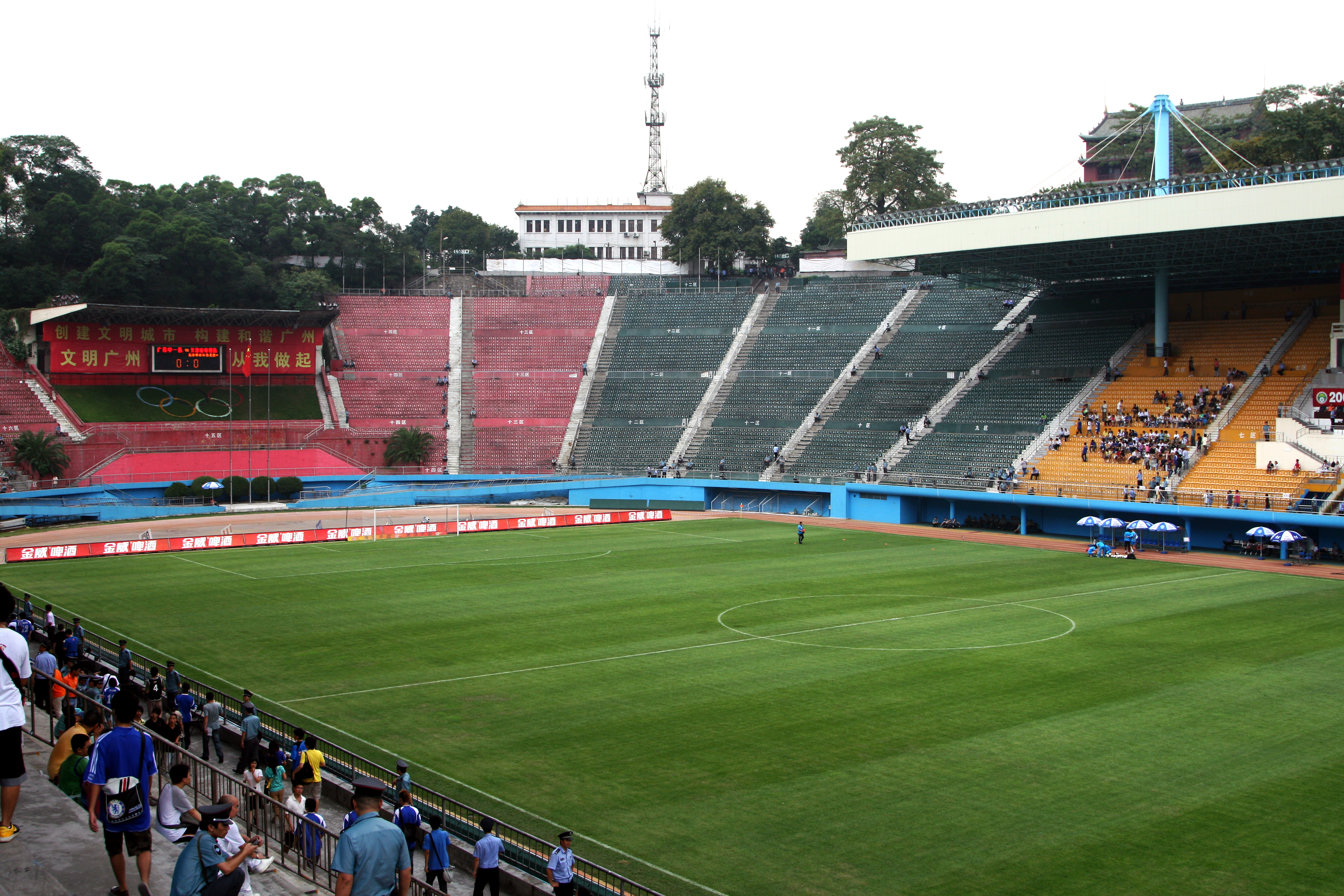
Yuexiushan Stadium in 2009, preparing for the 2010 Asian Games.

In the Qing dynasty, it was originally the location of the ammunition depot. When the Republic era came, Chen Jiongming planned to turn the area into a sports venue. The playground opened before 1926, and had muddy ground and few facilities. In 1950, the new government renovated the field as a sports stadium and arena for civic celebrations. As the home stadium of first the Guangzhou city team and later the Guangdong provincial team, Yuexiushan hosted a large number of friendly and international matches in the late 1950s and early 1960s, including against Algeria, Sweden and Soviet champions Spartak Moscow. After the end of the Cultural Revolution, visiting sides included the West German Olympic Team.

Yuexiushan was also the venue for Guangzhou's National Day celebrations, although an event to mark the 40th anniversary of the Russian October Revolution ended in disaster when 33 people were killed in a crush.

The Yuexiushan Stadium hosted the inaugural Guangdong-Hong Kong Cup match in early 1979, which Guangdong won 1–0.

By the late 1980s, Yuexiushan was no longer the premier ground in Guangzhou with the opening of the new Tianhe Stadium. However, Guangzhou continued to play their regular fixtures at Yuexiushan and finished second in the National Championship in 1992 and 1994, helped by an unbeaten record of 21 games at Yuexiushan.

Yuexiushan has undergone multiple renovations since the late 1990s which have seen player facilities in the entrance tower at the city end of the ground improved and a roof, electronic scoreboard and fixed plastic seating installed for spectators.

Following their promotion to the Chinese Super League (CSL), original tenants Guangzhou Evergrande moved out of the Yuexiushan Stadium, and relocated to the Tianhe Stadium ahead of the 2011 season. Another Guangzhou-based club, Guangzhou R&F, moved to the venue instead and played their first home game at Yuexiushan in the summer of 2011. The team was promoted to the CSL at the end of the season. Following R&F's third-place finish in 2014, Yuexiushan hosted four AFC Champions League games under floodlights in 2015.

Yuexiushan was renovated over the winter of 2016–17. The pitch was relayed, VIP facilities improved and the whole stadium painted blue (the colour of tenants Guangzhou R&F). The first match at the refurbished stadium was held on 28 April 2017 when R&F were defeated 3–1 by Guizhou Hengfeng in the CSL. Yuexiushan was later repainted in gold and green after Guangzhou R&F suffered a poor run of form. The decision was reportedly made on Feng Shui principles.

== Notable events ==
- October 1976: Guangdong 0–2 Australia. Australia were the first international side to tour China after Mao Zedong's death.
- May 1978: Yuexiushan hosted Guangdong vs. West Bromwich Albion friendly match.
- 25 December 2010: Super Show 3 Tour – The South Korean K-pop group Super Junior held a concert to a sold-out crowd of 30,000 people at the stadium.
- 17 March 2012: Yuexiushan hosted the first Canton Derby as Guangzhou R&F beat reigning league champions and former Yuexiushan tenants Guangzhou Evergrande, 2–0.
- Spring 2015: Yuexiushan hosted AFC Champions League football as Guangzhou R&F played in the group stages. The club came through two qualifying rounds after finishing third in the Chinese Super League in 2014.
