= Zhou Sui'an =

Chinese football manager

Zhou Sui'an 周穗安
Personal information
- Date of birth: 29 January 1961 (age 65)
- Place of birth: Guangzhou, Guangdong, China

Managerial career
- Years: Team
- 1990–1995: Guangzhou Apollo
- 1996: Shenzhen Feiyada
- 1997: Shenzhen Jinpeng
- 1998: Yunnan Hongta
- 1999–2003: Guangzhou F.C. (Note: Guangzhou F.C. was sponsored by various companies at that time, for the full list of name, see Guangzhou F.C.W#Ownership and naming history)
- 2003–2004: Nanjing Yoyo
- 2005–2006: Nanchang Bayi
- 2006–2007: Hangzhou Sanchao
- 2007: Zhejiang Greentown
- 2008: Hangzhou Sanchao
- 2008–2009: Hangzhou Greentown

Zhou Sui'an
- Simplified Chinese: 周穗安
Transcriptions
Standard Mandarin
- Hanyu Pinyin: Zhōu Suì'ān
- IPA: [ʈʂóʊ swêɪ.án]
Yue: Cantonese
- Jyutping: Zau1 Seoi6(ng)on1
- IPA: [tsɐ́u sɵ̀y.(ŋ)ɔ́ːn]

Zhou Sui'an (born 29 January 1961) is a Chinese football coach. He most recently worked as the manager of China Super League side Hangzhou Greentown.

== Managerial career ==
=== Guangzhou Apollo ===
Zhou Sui'an was born in Guangzhou. He became a professional coach after graduating from the Guangzhou Sports Institute. His ties to Guangzhou allowed Zhou Sui'an his first chance to be the Head coach of Guangzhou football team in 1990. He immediately made an impact when he quickly saw the team promoted to the top tier in his first attempt by coming second in the league. In his first season in the top tier, Zhou Sui'an would lead Guangzhou to fourth in the league and help establish them within the league. The following season was to personally prove his most successful when he helped guide Guangzhou to second in the league and even personally winning the 1992 Coach of the year award. Seeing Guangzhou become a professional football team he would once again lead Guangzhou to second in the 1994 league season.

=== Away from Guangzhou ===
Unable to actually win the league title yet still a highly rated coach, Zhou Sui'an would move to an ambitious football team named Shenzhen Feiyada in 1996, however his time with them was to prove to be a failure when Shenzhen were relegated at the end of the season. This immediately led to Zhou Sui'an's departure, yet he quickly found work when he moved to fellow Shenzhen team Shenzhen Jinpeng at the beginning of the 1997 league season. Unable to see them promoted from the second tier, Zhou Sui'an once again left after only one season. The following seasons would see Zhou Sui'an finding himself working for Yunnan Hongta and Guangzhou City with little success.

=== Return to Guangzhou Apollo ===
Halfway through the 2000 league season, Zhou Sui'an was brought back to Guangzhou Apollo who were in the second tier and fighting against relegation to the third tier. Zhou Sui'an would be successful in keeping Guangzhou Apollo in the second tier when they finished tenth, just enough to avoid relegation. In the 2001 league season Guangzhou Apollo changed their name to Guangzhou Geely and Zhou Sui'an was officially announced as their full-time manager. While their results significantly improved Zhou Sui'an, they were not promoted to the top tier, and on 2 September 2002, Zhou Sui'an was under increased pressure to see Guangzhou promoted. Guangzhou once again changed their name to Guangzhou Xiangxue and were immediately expecting promotion to the top tier; unable to achieve this, Guangzhou were left unsatisfied with Zhou Sui'an's progress, and he left his post on 18 February 2003. After several mouths out of management, Zhou Sui'an would be given the Nanjing Yoyo job in October. A second-tier club he spent two seasons with them before he left to join third-tier club Nanchang Bayi for a short time.

=== Hangzhou ===
Zhou Sui'an moved to Hangzhou Greentown F.C. in 2006, where he worked as a coach for them. He predominately worked with the youth team and coached Hangzhou Sanchao (Hangzhou Greentown F.C. youth team) for several seasons. In 2007 Zhou Sui'an was asked to help coach the senior team for a short period to help them avoid relegation from the top tier. Juggling both the senior team and youth team squads through much of the 2008 league season, Zhou Sui'an was eventually allowed to become the official head coach of the senior team by the end of the 2008 league season and helped guide them to mid-table safety by the end of the season. He was sacked on 20 September 2009, following a 4–1 defeat at the hands of Jiangsu Sainty that afternoon.
