= Guangzhou F.C. =

Chinese football club

Guangzhou FC
- Full name: Guangzhou Football Club
- Nickname: South China Tigers (华南虎)
- Founded: June 1954; 72 years ago
- Dissolved: 6 January 2025; 22 months ago
- Ground: Huadu Stadium
- Capacity: 13,394
Home colours	Away colours

Guangzhou F.C.
- Traditional Chinese: 廣州足球俱樂部
- Simplified Chinese: 广州足球俱乐部
- Jyutping: Gwong2 zau1 zuk1 kau4 keoi1 lok6 bou6
- Cantonese Yale: Gwóngjāu zūk kaù lokh bouh
- Hanyu Pinyin: Guǎngzhōu Zúqiú Jùlèbù
Transcriptions
Standard Mandarin
- Hanyu Pinyin: Guǎngzhōu Zúqiú Jùlèbù
Yue: Cantonese
- Yale Romanization: Gwóngjāu zūk kaù lokh bouh
- Jyutping: Gwong2 zau1 zuk1 kau4 keoi1 lok6 bou6

Guangzhou Football Club (simplified Chinese: 广州足球俱乐部; traditional Chinese: 廣州足球俱樂部; pinyin: Guǎngzhōu Zúqiú Jùlèbù), previously Guangzhou Evergrande (simplified Chinese: 广州恒大; traditional Chinese: 廣州恆大; pinyin: Guǎngzhōu Héngdà), was a Chinese professional football club based in Guangzhou, Guangdong. Historically, Guangzhou FC played its home matches at various grounds in their home city, most notably at Tianhe Stadium and Yuexiushan Stadium, and most recently at Huadu Stadium. The club's majority shareholders were the now-bankrupt Evergrande Real Estate Group and the e-commerce company Alibaba Group, while the rest of the shares were traded in the Chinese OTC system.

The club was founded in 1954, and won several second tier titles before turning professional in 1993. Their results improved, leading to a runners-up spot in China's top tier. Unable to improve upon these results, the club went through a period of stagnation and decline before they experienced a brief revival, when they won the 2007 second division. In 2009, the club was embroiled in a match-fixing scandal and was subsequently relegated. In 2010, the Evergrande Real Estate Group decided to purchase the club and pumped significant funds into the team. They immediately won promotion and gained their first top tier title in the 2011 season. Guangzhou was the most successful Chinese football club in continental competitions with two AFC Champions League titles (2013 and 2015), and participated in the FIFA Club World Cup in both years as a result. Between 2011 and 2017, Guangzhou won seven consecutive Chinese Super League titles, and after winning another Chinese Super League title in 2019, the club were relegated after the 2022 season amid financial difficulties. After the 2024 season, the club was dissolved due to failure to repay high debts.

According to a Forbes report from 2016, the team was valued at US$282 million, the highest out of all Chinese football teams, with a reported operating loss of over US$200 million in 2015.

== History ==
=== Early history ===
In June 1954, the local Guangzhou sports body founded Guangzhou Football Team to take part in the newly formed Chinese national football league. They entered the club in the 1955 league season and named Luo Dizhi as their first manager. He guided them to an eighth spot finish in their debut campaign. The league had grown to incorporate a second tier and their debut season performance final standing relegated them to the second division. Guangzhou won the division championship, however the Chinese Football Association decided to restructure the league at the beginning of the 1957 season and Guangzhou were denied promotion. Despite this, Luo Rongman managed the team to win the 1958 second division title; however, the club were unable to gain promotion because this time they went into receivership. They were not re-established until April 1961 and were allowed to take part in the top tier. Back within the top division Guangzhou often struggled within the league and were again relegated to the second tier at the end of the 1963 league season. They remained there until 1966 when the Cultural Revolution halted football in China.

=== Back-to-back promotions and sponsorship deal ===
When the Chinese football league restarted, Guangzhou took the unusual step of abstaining from the competition and instead on 26 October 1977 brought Luo Rongman to manage their youth team. The team played within the National Youth League until 1980 when it was decided that they were mature enough to play in the senior football league pyramid. They started in the recently established third division. The club's youth team development immediately paid off and players such as Mai Chao, Zhao Dayu and later Wu Qunli all rapidly rose into Chinese international footballers. Guangzhou gained successive promotions until they reached the top tier. At the end of the 1982 league season Guangzhou were relegated again. They returned to the top division at the end of the 1984 season via the Chinese FA Cup. Guangzhou also became the first Chinese team to gain sponsorship when the Guangzhou Baiyunshan Pharmaceutical Factory signed a $200,000 annual deal with the club.

=== Becoming fully professional and match-fixing scandal ===
Guangzhou Apollo logo used between 1993 and 1995

Throughout the 1990s, the Chinese Football Association were demanding more professionalism from their football teams. Guangzhou was one of the first fully professional football clubs in China after the Apollo Group took over the club on 8 January 1993. The investment aided the manager Zhou Sui'an to help create a competitive squad. Hu Zhijun won the top goalscoring award. Guangzhou were able to gain a runners-up spot in the 1994 league season. The following season Zhou Sui'an left the team after having twice guided the club to a runners-up position within the league and a runners-up spot against Shanghai in the 1991 Chinese FA Cup. After his exit, the club were unable to replicate the same results. When influential international footballers Peng Weiguo and Hu Zhijun left the club, the team went into free fall and were relegated at the end of the 1998 league season. With the management concerned about the team's performance, an investigation was launched which discovered that Wen Junwu and three other players were in collusion with gambling groups and were immediately expelled from the club. In 2001, the Guangzhou Sports Bureau took over the club again. With significant investment coming from the Zhejiang Geely Holding Group Co., Ltd it was hoped that the club could push for promotion. The division was rocked by a match-fixing scandal involving Changchun Yatai, Chengdu Wuniu, Jiangsu Sainty, and Zhejiang Greentown. Guangzhou's new sponsors Geely immediately pulled their funding from the team to distance themselves from the bad publicity. The club went through a tough transitional period until the Sunray Cave Group took over the club in 2004 and started to invest money in hopes of pushing for promotion. When the Guangzhou Pharmaceuticals group took over the club in 2006, they were able to realize the ambition of gaining promotion. The club won the 2007 second division title and entry to the Chinese Super League. In February 2010, Guangzhou was relegated back to the China League One in the fallout of a match-fixing scandal despite having achieved a ninth-place finish in the 2009 season. The match in question was the 19 August 2006 league game against Shanxi Wosen Luhu, which Guangzhou won 5–1 when they were still playing in the China League One. It was discovered by the police that the Guangzhou general manager Yang Xu paid ¥200,000 to the opposing general manager Wang Po to secure a win at home and that Guangzhou's vice presidents Wu Xiaodong and Xie Bin knew about it. With the offending participants sentenced to jail for fraud, the club was put up for sale. On 28 February 2010, Evergrande Real Estate Group took over the club for a fee of ¥100 million. Xu Jiayin, chairman of Evergrande Real Estate Group, said that they would pump more funds into the transfer market. His first act was to sign in Chinese national team striker Gao Lin from Shanghai Shenhua for a reported fee of ¥6 million. Then, he replaced the head coach Peng Weiguo with former Beijing Guoan manager Lee Jang-soo with no indication. In the 2010 summer transfer window, the club signed Sun Xiang, the first Chinese footballer to play in the UEFA Champions League with PSV Eindhoven, and the Chinese national team captain Zheng Zhi on 28 June 2010. On 30 June 2010, Guangzhou confirmed that they had signed Muriqui on a four-year deal from Campeonato Brasileiro Série A side Atlético Mineiro with a domestic record fee of ¥23 million. On 30 October 2010, Guangzhou became League One champions for the second time and returned to the Super League after a 3–1 win against Hunan Billows.

=== Domestic domination and international success ===
Guangzhou logo used in 2010

During the 2011 season, Guangzhou Evergrande further strengthened its squad with the purchase of Argentinean Dario Conca and Brazilian Cléo. Although the team was promoted to the Super League in the first year, they clinched the league title in late September 2011 although there were four games yet to play. In March 2012, Guangzhou played and won their first-ever AFC Champions League match, defeating South Korean champions Jeonbuk Hyundai Motors 5–1. In addition, Paraguayan Lucas Barrios left the German champions Borussia Dortmund in summer 2012 to join Guangzhou Evergrande. Marcello Lippi replaced Lee Jang-soo as the head coach and brought in South Korean defender Kim Young-gwon and Chinese midfielder Huang Bowen. Guangzhou was knocked out of the 2012 AFC Champions League when they lost 5–4 on aggregate to Al-Ittihad in the quarter-finals. They became the first Chinese side to reach the quarter-finals since 2006. During the 2012 season, Guangzhou won the league for the second time in a row, becoming the first team in China to win the Super League title twice in a row, while also securing the Chinese FA Cup to become double winners for 2012.

In the 2013 season, Guangzhou Evergrande strengthened their squad by signing Chinese goalkeeper Zeng Cheng and Brazilian Elkeson. This proved to be beneficial to Guangzhou as they became the first team in China to win the Super League three times in a row. The club also won the 2013 AFC Champions League by defeating FC Seoul in the final on the away goals rule, after drawing 2–2 in the first leg in Seoul and 1–1 in the second leg in Guangzhou, becoming the first Chinese side to win the tournament since 1990. By winning the AFC Champions League, Guangzhou was assured a place in the 2013 FIFA Club World Cup, entering in the quarter-finals, beating the African champions Al-Ahly 2–0. In the semi-finals, they were defeated by the European champions Bayern Munich 3–0. In the third place match, the club lost against the South American champions Atlético Mineiro 3–2 and finished in fourth place. Guangzhou won its fourth and fifth consecutive Chinese Super League titles in 2014 and 2015, respectively. On 21 November 2015, the club won its second continental championship, defeating Al-Ahli 1–0 on aggregate in the 2015 AFC Champions League Final. In the 2015 FIFA Club World Cup, Guangzhou won 2–1 against Club América in the quarter-finals before losing 3–0 against Barcelona in the semi-finals. Guangzhou also lost the third place match 2–1 against Hiroshima Sanfrecce, ending up in the same position as in the 2013 edition. By 2020, Guangzhou Evergrande won a total of eight Super League championships, including seven consecutive titles from 2011 to 2017.

=== Financial troubles, relegation and disbandment ===
Ahead of the 2021 season, the team was renamed Guangzhou FC due to the Chinese Football Association's request for "neutral" names that would omit references to the investors and companies that own the club. In the same year, the Chinese financial crisis and the problems of the Evergrande Group caused the financial collapse of the club. After losing several key players, the team was relegated from the Super League in 2022, ending their twelve-season stay in the top flight.

In January 2025, Guangzhou FC were expelled from the professional leagues of Chinese football, following the failure to pay off enough of their debt. As a result, the club announced its disbandment.

== Stadiums ==
Before the start of the 2023 China League One season, Guangzhou moved to Yuexiushan Stadium, the former ground of Guangzhou City. Previously, they played their home games at Tianhe Stadium with a capacity for 54,856 spectators. In April 2020, construction work began on the new 100,000-capacity Guangzhou Evergrande Football Stadium. Completion was scheduled for December 2022, in time to host the opening ceremony of the 2023 AFC Asian Cup. However, due to the Chinese property sector crisis, sparked by the Evergrande Group, the project was cancelled in mid-2022. On 29 February 2024, Guangzhou announced a move to the Huadu Stadium.

== Ownership and naming history ==
Year	Owner	Club name	Sponsored team name
1954–55	Central and Southern China Institute of Sports	Central and Southern China Sports Institute Football Team	Central and Southern China White
1955	Central and Southern China Institute of Sports	Central and Southern China Sports Institute Football Team	Guangzhou
1956	Central and Southern China Institute of Sports	Central and Southern China Sports Institute Football Team	Central and Southern China White
1956–57	Guangzhou Institute of Sports	Guangzhou Institute of Sports Football Team	
1958	Guangzhou Institute of Sports	Guangzhou Football Team	
1959–61	Guangzhou Public Security Bureau	Guangzhou Vanguard Football Team	
1962–66	Guangzhou Sports Bureau	Guangzhou Football Team	
1977–79	Guangzhou Sports Bureau	Guangzhou Youth Football Team	
1980–84	Guangzhou Sports Bureau	Guangzhou Football Team	
1985–89	Guangzhou Sports Bureau	Guangzhou Football Team	Guangzhou Baiyun
1989–93	Guangzhou Sports Bureau	Guangzhou Football Club	Guangzhou Baiyun
1993–2000	Guangdong Apollo Group	Guangzhou Apollo Football Club	
2001–02	Guangzhou Sports Bureau	Guangzhou Football Club	Guangzhou Geely
2002–03	Guangzhou Sports Bureau	Guangzhou Football Club	Guangzhou Xiangxue
2004–05	Sunray Cave Group	Guangzhou Football Club	Guangzhou Sunray Cave
2006–07	Guangzhou Pharmaceutical Holdings	Guangzhou GPC Football Club	
2008	Guangzhou Pharmaceutical Holdings	Guangzhou GPC Football Club	Guangzhou GPC Zhongyi
2009	Guangzhou Pharmaceutical Holdings	Guangzhou GPC Football Club	Guangzhou GPC Baiyunshan
2010	Guangzhou Sports Bureau	Guangzhou Football Club	
2010	Evergrande Real Estate Group	Guangzhou Evergrande Football Club	Guangzhou GAC
2011–14	Evergrande Real Estate Group	Guangzhou Evergrande Football Club	
2014–15	Evergrande Real Estate Group (50%→60%); Alibaba Group (50%→40%)	Guangzhou Evergrande Taobao Football Club	
2016–20	Evergrande Real Estate Group (56.71%); Alibaba Group (37.81%); Other shareholders in NEEQ (5.48%)	Guangzhou Evergrande Taobao Football Club	
2021–25	Evergrande Real Estate Group (56.71%); Alibaba Group (37.81%); Other shareholders in NEEQ (5.48%)	Guangzhou Football Club	

== Sponsorship ==
=== Kit manufacturers ===
Period	Kit manufacturer
1994	Umbro
1995	Reebok
1996	Diadora
1997	Reebok
1998–2005	Ucan
2006–2007	Godedke
2008–2023	Nike
2024	Kelme

== Rivalries ==
When professionalism was established within the Chinese football leagues in 1994, it allowed more than one team to play within each region. This saw the establishment of Guangzhou Matsunichi which used to be the youth academy of Guangzhou FC before being sold to Matsunichi Digital Holdings Limited. Direct ties between these two teams also saw them share the Yuexiushan Stadium. In their first meeting in the first round of the 1995 Chinese FA Cup, Matsunichi beat Guangzhou FC 4–3 on aggregate. For a brief period during the 1998 season, both teams were in the top tier with Matsunichi finishing higher than Guangzhou FC; however, the rivalry would reach its peak and subsequent conclusion during the 2000 season with both clubs in the second tier fighting relegation. On 15 July 2000, Guangzhou FC won 3–1 against Matsunichi which inevitably helped lead to Matsunichi's relegation, causing Matsunichi to disband at the end of the season.

When Guangzhou R&F moved to the city of Guangzhou, a local derby, often referred to as the Canton derby, was born. The first Canton derby was at Yuexiushan Stadium on 16 March 2012 as Guangzhou Evergrande lost 2–0 against Guangzhou R&F. Relations between the two club owners remain cordial off the pitch and club owners Xu Jiayin and Zhang Li were seen enjoying a meal together instead of watching the second derby in 2012, which Guangzhou R&F also won.

== Managerial history ==
=== Amateur period (1954–1993) ===
Manager	Period
(China) Luo Dizhi	1954–1956
(China) Zeng Peifu	1956
(China) Zheng Deyao	1956
(China) Luo Rongman	1956–1961
(China) Li Wenjun	1964
(China) Lin Xiaocai	1966–1976
(China) Luo Rongman	1977
(China) Feng Meilu	1977

Manager	Period
(China) Luo Rongman	1978–1982
(China) Cai Tangyao	1983–1984
(China) Chen Yiming	1985
(China) Qi Wusheng	1986–1988
(China) Xie Zhiguang	1989
(China) Chen Yiming	1990
(China) Zhou Sui'an	1991–1993

=== Professional period (1994–2024) ===
Manager	Period	Honours
(China) Zhou Sui'an	1994 – 7 June 1995	
(China) Zhang Jingtian	8 June 1995 – 28 December 1995	
(China) Xie Zhiguang	January 1996 – 15 April 1996	
(China) Xian Dixiong	16 April 1996 – December 1996	
(China) Chen Yiming	January 1997 – 13 August 1997	
(China) Mai Chao	13 August 1997 – 12 June 1998	
(China) Chen Xirong	12 June 1998 – 4 May 1999	
(China) Zhao Dayu	5 May 1999 – December 1999	
(Brazil) Gildo Rodrigues	January 2000 – 19 April 2000	
(China) Zhou Sui'an	19 April 2000 – 23 September 2000	
(Brazil) Edson Tavares (caretaker)	13 November 2000 – 11 December 2000	
(China) Liu Kang	11 December 2000 – 25 July 2001	
(China) Zhou Sui'an	25 July 2001 – 2 September 2002	
(China) Wu Qunli	2 September 2002 – 19 December 2002	
(China) Zhou Sui'an	19 December 2002 – 18 February 2003	
(China) Mai Chao	18 February 2003 – 31 October 2005	
(Croatia) Drago Mamić (caretaker)	25 November 2005 – 25 February 2006	
(China) Qi Wusheng	25 February 2006 – 31 December 2006	
(China) Shen Xiangfu	4 January 2007 – 30 November 2009	2007 China League One
(China) Peng Weiguo (caretaker)	1 December 2009 – 25 March 2010	
(South Korea) Lee Jang-soo	25 March 2010 – 16 May 2012	2010 China League One; 2011 Chinese Super League; 2012 Chinese FA Super Cup
(Italy) Marcello Lippi	17 May 2012 – 2 November 2014	2012 Chinese Super League; 2012 Chinese FA Cup; 2013 Chinese Super League; 2013 AFC Champions League; 2014 Chinese Super League
(Italy) Fabio Cannavaro	5 November 2014 – 4 June 2015	
(Brazil) Luiz Felipe Scolari	4 June 2015 – 5 November 2017	2015 Chinese Super League; 2015 AFC Champions League; 2016 Chinese FA Super Cup; 2016 Chinese Super League; 2016 Chinese FA Cup; 2017 Chinese FA Super Cup; 2017 Chinese Super League
(Italy) Fabio Cannavaro	9 November 2017 – 28 September 2021	2018 Chinese FA Super Cup; 2019 Chinese Super League
(China) Zheng Zhi (caretaker)	7 December 2021 – January 2022	
(China) Liu Zhiyu	4 May 2022 – 14 August 2022	
(China) Zheng Zhi	14 August 2022 – 30 March 2023	
(China) Liu Zhiyu	30 March 2023 – 5 June 2023	
(Spain) Salva Suay	6 June 2023 – 25 December 2024	

== Honours ==
All-time honours list, including those achieved during the club's semi-professional period.

=== Domestic ===
==== League ====
- Chinese Jia-A League (top division until 2003)
  - Runners-up (2): 1992, 1994
- Chinese Super League (top division since 2004)
  - Winners (8): 2011, 2012, 2013, 2014, 2015, 2016, 2017, 2019
  - Runners-up (2): 2018, 2020
- Chinese Second Division / Jia-B League (second division until 2003)
  - Winners (3): 1956, 1958, 1981
  - Runners-up (2): 1983, 1990
- China League One (second division since 2004)
  - Winners (2): 2007, 2010

==== Cups ====
- Chinese FA Cup
  - Winners (2): 2012, 2016
  - Runners-up (2): 1991, 2013
- Chinese FA Super Cup
  - Winners (4): 2012, 2016, 2017, 2018
  - Runners-up (3): 2013, 2014, 2015

=== International ===
- AFC Champions League
  - Winners (2): 2013, 2015
- FIFA Club World Cup
  - Fourth place (2): 2013, 2015

== Results ==
=== All-time league rankings ===
Year	Div	Pld	W	D	L	GF	GA	GD	Pts	Pos.	FA Cup	Super Cup	League Cup	AFC	Other	
1955	1	10	3	1	6	12	33	−21	7	8	—	—	—	—		
1956	2	5	4	1	0	13	1	+12	14	1^{a}	DNQ	—	—	—		
1957	2									5^{b}	NH	—	—	—		
1958	2	5	4	1	0	13	5	+8	14^{b}	1	NH	—	—	—		
1961	1										NH	—	—	—		
1962	1	7	1	4	2	4	5	–1	6^{b}	25	NH	—	—	—		
1963	1	8	0	3	5	4	14	–10	3^{b}	20	NH	—	—	—		
1964	2									7^{b}	NH	—	—	—		
1965	2									6^{b}	NH	—	—	—		
1980	3	8	3	4	1	13	4	+9	10^{b}	2	NH	—	—	—		
1981	2	30	24	—	6				48	1	NH	—	—	—		
1982	1	30	9	—	21	23	53	−30	18	15	NH	—	—	—		
1983	2	15	11	—	4				22	2^{a}	NH	—	—	—		
1984	2									3^{c}	8th	—	—	—		
1985	1	15	8	—	7			+6	17	7	4th	—	—	DNQ		
1986	1	14	6	4	4	14	13	+1	16	7	DNE	—	—	DNQ		
1987	1	14	5	1	8	14	19	−5	16	7	NH	—	—	DNQ		
1988	1	25	10	10	5	32	19	+13	43	7	NH	—	—	DNQ		
1989	1	14	1	5	8	8	22	−14	10	8	NH	—	—	DNQ		
1990	2	22	8	11	3	27	15	+12	35	2	R1	—	—	DNQ		
1991	1	14	4	7	3	16	13	+3	16	4	RU	—	—	DNQ		
1992	1	14	8	2	4	19	15	+4	18	2	R1	—	—	DNQ		
1993	1	6^{b}	2	0/3^{d}	1	8	7	+1	4^{b}	8	NH	—	—	DNQ		
1994	1	22	11	5	6	36	27	+9	27	2	NH	—	—	DNQ		
1995	1	22	7	7	8	28	27	+1	28	5	R1	DNQ	—	DNQ		
1996	1	22	7	8	7	26	25	+1	29	7	R16	DNQ	—	DNQ		
1997	1	22	5	10	7	14	20	−6	25	8	R16	DNQ	—	DNQ		
1998	1	26	4	8	14	25	41	−16	20	14	R1	DNQ	—	DNQ		
1999	2	22	6	8	8	26	30	−4	26	8	R2	DNQ	—	DNQ		
2000	2	22	6	7	9	27	27	0	25	10	R1	DNQ	—	DNQ		
2001	2	22	11	7	4	31	16	+15	40	4	R1	DNQ	—	DNQ		
2002	2	22	4	9	9	23	30	−7	21	11	R1	DNQ	—	DNQ		
2003	2	26	13	9	4	40	20	+20	48	3	R1	DNQ	—	DNQ		
2004	2	32	12	16	4	47	29	+18	52	4	R1	NH	DNQ	DNQ		
2005	2	26	15	7	4	50	22	+28	52	4	R2	NH	DNQ	DNQ		
2006	2	24	15	3	6	45	25	+20	48	3	R2	NH	NH	DNQ		
2007	2	24	19	4	1	65	15	+50	61	1	NH	NH	NH	DNQ		
2008	1	30	10	10	10	41	42	−1	40	7	NH	NH	NH	DNQ		
2009	1	30	9	10	11	38	38	0	37	9^{e}	NH	NH	NH	DNQ		
2010	2	24	17	6	1	61	21	+40	57	1	NH	NH	NH	DNQ		
2011	1	30	20	8	2	67	23	+44	68	1	R2	NH	NH	DNQ		
2012	1	30	17	7	6	51	30	+21	58	1	W	W	NH	QF		
2013	1	30	24	5	1	78	18	+60	77	1	RU	RU	NH	W	CWC	4th
2014	1	30	22	4	4	76	28	+48	70	1	R4	RU	NH	QF		
2015	1	30	19	10	1	71	28	+43	67	1	R3	RU	NH	W	CWC	4th
2016	1	30	19	7	4	62	19	+43	64	1	W	W	NH	Group		
2017	1	30	20	4	6	69	42	+27	64	1	SF	W	NH	QF		
2018	1	30	20	3	7	82	36	+46	63	2	R5	W	NH	R16		
2019	1	30	23	3	4	68	24	+44	72	1	QF	DNQ	NH	SF		
2020	1	14^{f}	11	1	2	31	12	+19	34^{f}	RU^{g}	R2	Cancelled^{h}	NH	Group		
2021	1	22	13	5	4	47	17	+30	44	3	R4	NH	NH	Group		
2022	1	34	3	8	23	24	63	–39	17	17	R3	NH	NH	Group		
2023	2	30	8	6	16	31	43	–12	30	12	R3	DNQ	NH	DNQ		
2024	2	30	14	10	6	51	35	+16	52	3	R3	DNQ	NH	DNQ		

Notes

No league games in 1959, 1966–1972, 1975, and 1976; Guangzhou did not enter the league in 1960, 1973, 1974, 1977, 1978, and 1979.
^a No promotion. ^b In final group stage. ^c In Changsha Group (first round). ^d Drawn matches were decided on penalties after 90 minutes. ^e Relegated for match-fixing scandal.
^f In Group A. ^g Lost in the CSL championship final. ^h Not played due to the COVID-19 pandemic.

Key

	China top division
	China second division
	China third division
W	Winners
RU	Runners-up
	Relegated

- Div = Division
- Pld = Played
- W = Games won
- D = Games drawn
- L = Games lost
- F = Goals for
- A = Goals against
- Pts = Points
- Pos. = Final position
- DNQ = Did not qualify
- DNE = Did not enter
- NH = Not held
- – = Did not exist
- R1 = First round
- R2 = Second round
- R3 = Third round
- R4 = Fourth round
- R5 = Fifth round
- SF = Semi-finals
- QF = Quarter-finals
- R16 = Round of 16
- Group = Group stage

== International players ==
Names in bold indicate players who had international appearances for their countries while playing for Guangzhou.

**Angola**

- Quinzinho (2003–2004)

**Australia**

- Brad Maloney (1995)

**Belarus**

- Mikalay Ryndzyuk (2005)

**Brazil**

- **Paulinho** (2015–2017, 2018–2021)
- Ricardo Goulart (2015–2021)
- Robinho (2015)

**Cameroon**

- Bertin Tomou (2001)

**Canada**

- Charles Gbeke (2010)

**China PR**

- **A Lan** (2015–2021)
- **Ai Kesen** (2013–2016, 2019–2021)
- Bai Lei (2008–2009)
- Chen Guokang (2023)
- **Deng Hanwen** (2018–2022)
- **Dong Xuesheng** (2014–2015)
- Feng Renliang (2013–2014)
- **Feng Xiaoting** (2011–2020)
- **Gao Lin** (2010–2019)
- **Gao Zhunyi** (2019–2022)
- Hao Junmin (2022–2023)
- **He Chao** (2019–2022)
- Hu Zhaojun (2009–2010)
- **Hu Zhijun** (1990–1997)
- **Huang Bowen** (2012–2022)
- **Huang Hongtao** (1990–1996, 1999–2000)
- **Huang Qineng** (1991–1998)
- **Jiang Guangtai** (2019–2022)
- Jiang Ning (2011–2012)
- **Kong Guoxian** (1986–1993, 1998)
- Li Jianhua (2009–2012)
- Li Wei (2005–2006)
- **Li Xuepeng** (2014–2023)
- **Li Yong** (1988–1995)
- Liao Jintao (2020–2021, 2023–2024)
- **Liao Lisheng** (2013–2022)
- **Liu Dianzuo** (2016–2022)
- **Liu Jian** (2014–2017)
- Liu Yiming (2019–2022)
- **Luo Guofu** (2020–2021)
- **Mai Chao** (1981–1995)
- **Mei Fang** (2014–2022)
- **Peng Weiguo** (1990–1997)
- Peng Xinli (2012–2016)
- **Qin Sheng** (2012–2014)
- **Rong Hao** (2012–2020)
- **Rong Zhixing** (1966–1969)
- **Su Yongshun** (1950s)
- **Sun Xiang** (2010–2014)
- **Wang Jingbin** (2015–2020)
- **Wei Shihao** (2019–2023)
- **Wu Pingfeng** (2008–2012)
- **Wu Qunli** (1983–1985, 1990–1993)
- Xu Liang (2007–2009)
- **Yang Hao** (2011)
- Yang Jun (2011–2013)
- **Yang Liyu** (2018–2023)
- **Ye Weichao** (2011–2014)
- **Yu Hanchao** (2014–2020)
- **Zeng Cheng** (2013–2020)
- Zhang Chenglin (2017–2023)
- Zhang Jiaqi (2015–2020)
- **Zhang Linpeng** (2011–2022)
- **Zhang Wenzhao** (2016–2020)
- **Zhang Xiuwei** (2019–2023)
- **Zhao Dayu** (1978–1986)
- **Zhao Peng** (2013–2014)
- **Zhao Xuri** (2012–2015)
- **Zheng Long** (2013–2019)
- **Zheng Zhi** (2010–2022)
- **Zou Zheng** (2015–2018)

**Colombia**

- Jackson Martínez (2016–2019)

**DR Congo**

- Patrick Katalay (2000–2001)

**Honduras**

- Luis Ramírez (2001, 2007–2009)

**Hong Kong**

- **Ng Wai Chiu** (2002–2003)
- Wei Zhao (2003–2006)

**Italy**

- Alessandro Diamanti (2014)
- Alberto Gilardino (2014)

**Korea Republic**

- Cho Won-hee (2011–2012)
- Kim Hyung-il (2017)
- **Kim Young-gwon** (2012–2018)
- Park Ji-ho (1998)
- **Park Ji-soo** (2019–2022)

**Nigeria**

- Dominic Iorfa (1997)

**Paraguay**

- Lucas Barrios (2012–2013)
- Casiano Delvalle (2007)

**Peru**

- Ismael Alvarado (2008–2009)

**Romania**

- Corneliu Papură (2006)
- Claudiu Răducanu (2006)
- Constantin Schumacher (2006)

**Serbia**

- Nemanja Gudelj (2018)

**Trinidad and Tobago**

- **Arnold Dwarika** (2004)
- **Gary Glasgow** (2003–2004)

**Uruguay**

- Alejandro Javier Larrea (2001)
