= 1990 Dynasty Cup squads =

Men's team squads for the 1990 Dynasty Cup played in Beijing, China.

== Group A ==
=== China ===
Head coach: (China) Gao Fengwen

No.	Pos.	Player	Date of birth (age)	Caps	Goals	Club
1	GK	Fu Yubin	28 May 1957 (aged 33)			(Chinese Football Association) Liaoning
2	DF	Zhu Bo	24 September 1960 (aged 29)			(Chinese Football Association) Bayi
3	DF	Gao Sheng	10 May 1962 (aged 28)			(Chinese Football Association) Liaoning
4	DF	Guo Yijun	11 December 1963 (aged 26)			(Chinese Football Association) Guangdong
6	MF	Wu Qunli	20 March 1960 (aged 30)			(Chinese Football Association) Guangzhou
7	MF	Xie Yuxin	12 October 1968 (aged 21)			(Chinese Football Association) Guangdong
8	FW	Tang Yaodong	1 February 1962 (aged 28)			(Chinese Football Association) Liaoning
9	FW	Liu Haiguang	11 July 1963 (aged 27)			(Chinese Football Association) Shanghai
10	FW	Ma Lin	28 July 1962 (aged 27)			(Chinese Football Association) Liaoning
11	FW	Ju Lijin	31 January 1966 (aged 24)			(Chinese Football Association) Shanghai
12	FW	Wang Baoshan	13 April 1963 (aged 27)			(Japan Football Association) Otsuka Pharmaceutical
13	DF	Li Hongbing	10 August 1965 (aged 24)			(Chinese Football Association) Jiangsu
14	DF	Zhao Faqing	3 January 1964 (aged 26)			(Chinese Football Association) Liaoning
17	DF	Mai Chao	3 May 1964 (aged 26)			(Chinese Football Association) Guangzhou
18	MF	Duan Ju	3 October 1963 (aged 26)			(Chinese Football Association) Tianjin
19	MF	Wang Tao	9 April 1967 (aged 23)			(Chinese Football Association) Beijing
20	GK	Zhang Huikang	22 July 1962 (aged 28)			(Chinese Football Association) Shanghai
	MF	Zhang Xiaowen	15 July 1964 (aged 26)			(Chinese Football Association) Guangdong
	MF	Sun Bowei	28 January 1968 (aged 22)			(Chinese Football Association) Sichuan

=== Japan ===
Head coach: (Japan) Kenzo Yokoyama

No.	Pos.	Player	Date of birth (age)	Caps	Goals	Club
1	GK	Shigetatsu Matsunaga	12 August 1962 (aged 27)			(Japan Football Association) Nissan Motors
2	DF	Yoshinori Taguchi	14 September 1965 (aged 24)			(Japan Football Association) ANA Yokohama
3	DF	Yuji Sakakura	7 June 1967 (aged 23)			(Japan Football Association) Furukawa Electric
4	DF	Toru Sano	15 November 1963 (aged 26)			(Japan Football Association) Nissan Motors
5	MF	Tetsuji Hashiratani	15 July 1964 (aged 26)			(Japan Football Association) Nissan Motors
6	DF	Takumi Horiike	6 September 1965 (aged 24)			(Japan Football Association) Yomiuri
7	DF	Masami Ihara	18 September 1967 (aged 22)			(Japan Football Association) Nissan Motors
8	MF	Yasuharu Sorimachi	8 March 1964 (aged 26)			(Japan Football Association) ANA Yokohama
9	MF	Shiro Kikuhara	7 July 1969 (aged 21)			(Japan Football Association) Yomiuri
10	MF	Masanao Sasaki	19 June 1962 (aged 28)			(Japan Football Association) Honda FC
11	MF	Masahiro Wada	21 January 1965 (aged 25)			(Japan Football Association) Matsushita Electric
12	FW	Shinichiro Tani	13 November 1968 (aged 21)			(Japan Football Association) University of Tsukuba
13	MF	Masahiro Fukuda	27 December 1966 (aged 23)			(Japan Football Association) Mitsubishi Motors
14	DF	Hiroshi Hirakawa	10 January 1965 (aged 25)			(Japan Football Association) Nissan Motors
15	FW	Akihiro Nagashima	9 April 1964 (aged 26)			(Japan Football Association) Matsushita Electric
16	FW	Nobuhiro Takeda	10 May 1967 (aged 23)			(Japan Football Association) Yomiuri
18	FW	Kenta Hasegawa	25 September 1965 (aged 24)			(Japan Football Association) Nissan Motors
19	GK	Shinichi Morishita	28 December 1960 (aged 29)			(Japan Football Association) Yamaha Motors
20	FW	Masashi Nakayama	23 September 1967 (aged 22)			(Japan Football Association) Yamaha Motors
23	MF	Katsumi Oenoki	3 April 1965 (aged 25)			(Japan Football Association) Yamaha Motors

=== North Korea ===
Head coach: (North Korea) Kim Jong-Min

No.	Pos.	Player	Date of birth (age)	Caps	Goals	Club
1	GK	Kim Chi-Won	17 October 1967 (aged 22)			(DPR Korea Football Association)
3	DF	Chong Yong-Man	8 January 1970 (aged 20)			(DPR Korea Football Association)
9	MF	Yun Jong-Su	3 January 1962 (aged 28)			(DPR Korea Football Association)
10	MF	Ri Hyok-Chon				(DPR Korea Football Association)
11	DF	Paek Gil-Song	27 August 1963 (aged 26)			(DPR Korea Football Association)
12	MF	Jon Man-Ho				(DPR Korea Football Association)
14	FW	Choi Yong-Son	10 October 1972 (aged 17)			(DPR Korea Football Association)
16	DF	Kim Kyong-Il	10 October 1970 (aged 19)			(DPR Korea Football Association)
17	MF	Pang Gwang-Chol	27 September 1970 (aged 19)			(DPR Korea Football Association)
18	DF	Kim Gwang-Min	16 August 1962 (aged 27)			(DPR Korea Football Association)
19	MF	Ri Jong-Man	8 March 1959 (aged 31)			(DPR Korea Football Association)
21	DF	Oh Yong-Nam	10 September 1960 (aged 29)			(DPR Korea Football Association)
	DF	Tak Yong-Bin	23 July 1962 (aged 28)			(DPR Korea Football Association)
	FW	Han Hyong-Il	1960			(DPR Korea Football Association)

=== South Korea ===
Head coach: (South Korea) Lee Cha-Man

No.	Pos.	Player	Date of birth (age)	Caps	Goals	Club
1	GK	Choi In-Young	5 March 1962 (aged 28)			(Korea Football Association) Hyundai Tigers
2	DF	Park Kyung-Hoon	19 January 1961 (aged 29)			(Korea Football Association) POSCO Atoms
3	DF	Chung Jong-Soo	27 March 1961 (aged 29)			(Korea Football Association) Hyundai Tigers
4	DF	Yoon Deok-Yeo	25 March 1961 (aged 29)			(Korea Football Association) Hyundai Tigers
5	DF	Chung Yong-hwan	10 February 1960 (aged 30)			(Korea Football Association) Daewoo Royals
6	MF	Kim Sang-Ho	5 October 1964 (aged 25)			(Korea Football Association) POSCO Atoms
7	MF	Lee Young-Jin	27 October 1963 (aged 26)			(Korea Football Association) Lucky-Goldstar Hwangso
8	DF	Kim Pan-Keun	5 March 1966 (aged 24)			(Korea Football Association) Daewoo Royals
9	MF	Hwangbo Kwan	1 March 1965 (aged 25)			(Korea Football Association) Yukong Elephants
10	MF	Kim Joo-Sung	17 January 1966 (aged 24)			(Korea Football Association) Daewoo Royals
11	FW	Byun Byung-Joo	26 April 1961 (aged 29)			(Korea Football Association) Hyundai Tigers
12	MF	Noh Jung-Yoon	28 March 1971 (aged 19)			(Korea Football Association) Korea University
13	DF	Choi Young-Jun	16 August 1965 (aged 24)			(Korea Football Association) Lucky-Goldstar Hwangso
14	FW	Choi Soon-Ho	10 January 1962 (aged 28)			(Korea Football Association) Lucky-Goldstar Hwangso
15	GK	Kim Poong-Joo	1 October 1961 (aged 28)			(Korea Football Association) Daewoo Royals
16	MF	Kim Joo-Sung	17 January 1964 (aged 26)			(Korea Football Association) Daewoo Royals
17	MF	Gu Sang-Bum	15 June 1964 (aged 26)			(Korea Football Association) Lucky-Goldstar Hwangso
18	FW	Hwang Sun-Hong	14 July 1968 (aged 22)			(Korea Football Association) Konkuk University
19	FW	Seo Jung-Won	17 December 1970 (aged 19)			(Korea Football Association) Korea University
20	DF	Hong Myung-Bo	12 June 1969 (aged 21)			(Korea Football Association) Korea University
