= 1994 Dalian Wanda F.C. season =

Dalian Wanda F.C.
- Chairman: (China) Wang Jianlin
- Manager: (China) Zhang Honggen
- Jia-A League: Winner
- Top goalscorer: Wang Tao (16 goals)

The 1994 Dalian Wanda F.C. season was Dalian's 10th consecutive season in the top division of Chinese football, and the first season to compete as a fully professional team.

== Overview ==
The 1994 season was the first season that the Jia-A League had turned professional. Private enterprises were allowed to sponsor or operate a football club. Wang Jianlin, owner of the Wanda Group, acquired the Dalian football club, and reorganized the team as Dalian Wanda Football Club in March 1994. Originally, he planned to establish a team that consist players and managerial staff only from Dalian, but was convinced by Gai Zengjun, former manager of the team. He threw quite some money at the time by appointing Zhang Honggen from Shanghai as the head coach, and set high winning bonuses for the team. Dalian Wanda won the 1994 Chinese Jia-A League without effort.

Since round 5 of the 1994 season, the team set a record of 57 unbeaten home league matches.

== Players ==
As of the 1994 season.

No.	Name	Nat.	Place of birth	Date of birth	Aged	Joined from
Goalkeepers
1	Han Wenhai	(China)	Dalian	28 January 1971	22	Dalian
23	Zhou Yong	(China)	Dalian	28 July 1973	20	Dalian youth
24	Chen Dong	(China)	Dalian	3 May 1978	15	Dalian youth
Defenders
2	Zhang Enhua	(China)	Dalian	28 April 1973	20	Dalian
3	Zhao Lin	(China)	Dalian	15 February 1966	27	Dalian
4	Zhu Xiaodong	(China)	Dalian	25 January 1969	24	Dalian
5	Xu Hong	(China)	Dalian	17 April 1968	25	Dalian
14	Zheng Yong	(China)	Dalian	28 June 1973	20	Dalian youth
19	Fan Wei	(China)	Dalian	20 June 1973	20	Dalian
21	Sun Jihai	(China)	Dalian	17 August 1977	16	Dalian youth
22	Wu Jun	(China)	Dalian	24 March 1977	16	Dalian youth
Midfielders
6	Li Ming	(China)	Dalian	26 January 1971	22	Dalian
7	Xu Hui	(China)	Dalian	22 August 1968	25	Dalian
8	Ma Xiaohong	(China)	Dalian	24 October 1970	23	Dalian
9	Wang Tao	(China)	Dalian	9 April 1967	26	Bayi
10	Shi Lei	(China)	Dalian	19 June 1963	30	Dalian
12	Sun Minghui	(China)	Dalian	20 April 1971	22	Dalian
13	Gao Jinggang	(China)	Dalian	8 January 1971	22	Dalian
15	Sun Xiaodong	(China)	Dalian	19 February 1974	19	Dalian
18	Liu Zhongchang	(China)	Dalian	31 August 1962	31	Dalian
25	Wang Jun	(China)	Dalian	20 April 1963	30	Dalian
Forwards
11	Wei Yimin	(China)	Dalian	12 July 1971	22	Dalian
16	Gao Xu	(China)	Dalian	2 April 1967	26	Liaoning
17	Zhang Gang	(China)	Dalian	30 March 1977	16	Dalian youth
20	Wang Tao	(China)	Dalian	22 April 1970	23	Dalian

== Coaching staff ==
Position	Name	Note
Head coach	(China) Zhang Honggen	
Assistant coach	(China) Gai Zengjun	
Assistant coach	(China) Guo Xinyuan	
Assistant coach	(China) Yang Xianmin	
Team doctor	(China) Xu Liaosheng	

== Chinese Jia-A League ==
=== League table ===
Pos	Team	Pld	W	D	L	GF	GA	GD	Pts
1	Dalian Wanda	22	14	5	3	43	21	+22	33
2	Guangzhou Apollo	22	11	5	6	36	27	+9	27
3	Shanghai Shenhua	22	10	6	6	36	36	0	26
4	Liaoning Yuandong	22	11	3	8	47	36	+11	25
5	Shandong Taishan	22	10	4	8	22	22	0	24

Source: rsssf.com

== Squad statistics ==
=== Appearances and goals ===
No.	Pos.	Player	Nat.	Jia-A League	
No.	Pos.	Player	Nat.	App.	Goals
1	GK	Han Wenhai	(China)	22	0
2	DF	Zhang Enhua	(China)	12	1
3	DF	Zhao Lin	(China)	19	2
4	DF	Zhu Xiaodong	(China)	20	0
5	DF	Xu Hong	(China)	21	1
6	MF	Li Ming	(China)	21	2
7	MF	Xu Hui	(China)	21	2
8	MF	Ma Xiaohong	(China)	14	0
9	MF	Wang Tao	(China)	21	3
10	MF	Shi Lei	(China)	21	3
11	FW	Wei Yimin	(China)	21	4
12	MF	Sun Minghui	(China)	16	3
13	MF	Gao Jinggang	(China)	8	0
14	DF	Zheng Yong	(China)	0	0
15	MF	Sun Xiaodong	(China)	0	0
16	FW	Gao Xu	(China)	18	8
17	FW	Zhang Gang	(China)	1	0
18	MF	Liu Zhongchang	(China)	21	2
19	DF	Fan Wei	(China)	0	0
20	FW	Wang Tao (born 1970)	(China)	19	12
21	DF	Sun Jihai	(China)	0	0
22	DF	Wu Jun	(China)	0	0
23	GK	Zhou Yong	(China)	0	0
24	GK	Chen Dong	(China)	0	0
25	MF	Wang Jun	(China)	0	0
Total					43

=== Goal scorers ===
Rank	Player	Goals
1	Wang Tao (born 1970)	12
2	Gao Xu	9
3	Wei Yimin	4
4	Shi Lei	3
4	Sun Minghui	3
4	Wang Tao (born 1967)	3
7	Liu Zhongchang	2
7	Xu Hui	2
7	Zhao Lin	2
10	Li Ming	1
10	Xu Hong	1
10	Zhang Enhua	1
Total		43
