= 2005 Chinese FA Cup =

2005 The Chinese Football Association Cup
CFA Cup

Tournament details
- Country: China
- Teams: 28

Final positions
- Champions: Dalian Shide (2nd title)
- Runners-up: Shandong Luneng Taishan
- Champions League: Dalian Shide

Tournament statistics
- Matches played: 41
- Goals scored: 129 (3.15 per match)
- Top goal scorer(s): (China) Zou Jie (7 goals)

The 2005 Chinese FA Cup (Chinese: 2005中国足球协会杯) was the 11th edition of Chinese FA Cup. The matches of first round were kicked off on 26 March 2005, and the final took place on 20 November 2005.

== Results ==
=== First round ===
| 26 March | Dalian Shide | 3–0 | Yanbian FC | Jinzhou Stadium, Dalian |
| 14:30 | Zou Jie 60'; Janković 73' (pen.); Zhu Ting 81' |

| 26 March | Liaoning FC ^{1} | 0–0 (a.e.t.) (1–3 p) | Harbin Guoli | Tieling Stadium, Tieling |
| 14:30 |
| | Penalties |
| | Penalty missed Penalty scored | | (penalty missed) Tao Peng; (penalty scored) Zhou Haogang; (penalty scored) Wang Cun; (penalty scored) Cong Lin |

| 26 March | Xiamen Blue Lions | 2–0 | Jiangsu Sainty | Longyan Sports Center, Longyan |
| 14:30 | Lu Xin 67'; Yang Xiaoqi 90' |

| 26 March | Guangzhou Sunray Cave | 2–0 | Changchun City Evening News Yatai | Yiyang Stadium, Yiyang |
| 15:00 | Wen Xiaoming 22'; Li Haifeng 90' |

| 26 March | Inter Shanghai | 1–0 | Chengdu Wuniu | Songjiang Stadium, Shanghai |
| 15:00 | Zhan Keqiang 22' |

| 26 March | Hunan Shoking | 2–0 (a.e.t.) | Shenyang Ginde | Helong Stadium, Changsha |
| 15:00 | Liu Jiaqing 99'; Agbo 104' |

| 26 March | Beijing Hyundai | 1–0 | Nanjing Changling | Workers Stadium, Beijing |
| 15:00 | Tao Wei 2' |

| 26 March | Zhejiang Babei Greentown | 1–1 (a.e.t.) (7–6 p) | Chongqing Lifan | Huanglong Stadium, Hangzhou |
| 15:00 | Huang Long 9' | | Wang Kai 43' |
| | Penalties |
| | Yu Shunping (penalty scored); Huang Long (penalty missed); Yang Zheng (penalty scored); Wu Wei (penalty missed); Tomou (penalty scored); Hu Minghua (penalty scored); Shen Liuxi (penalty scored); Camara (penalty scored); Xu Lei (penalty scored) | | (penalty scored) Li Guoxu; (penalty missed) Sun Zhi; (penalty scored) Wang Kai; (penalty scored) Jia Wenpeng; (penalty missed) Fan Yun (penalty scored) (penalty scored) (penalty scored); (penalty missed) Zhang Yu |

| 26 March | Tianjin Master Kong | 4–4 (a.e.t.) (3–4 p) | Qingdao Hisense | Minyuan Stadium, Tianjin |
| 15:00 | Wu Weian 16'; Yu Genwei 24'; Lu Yan 29'; Zhang Shuo 86' | | Xiao Jinliang 18'; Yu Yang 42'; Nagy 53'; Claudinei 58' |
| | Penalties |
| | Wu Weian (penalty missed); Lu Yan (penalty scored); Zhang Shuo (penalty scored); Wang Lei (penalty scored); Wei Zhonghu (penalty missed) | | Penalty scored |

| 26 March | Qingdao Jonoon | 0–0 (a.e.t.) (3–4 p) | Dalian Changbo | Tiantai Stadium, Qingdao |
| 15:00 |
| | Penalties |
| | Liu Junwei (penalty scored); Lu Feng (penalty missed); Liu Jian (penalty scored) (penalty scored); Bai Yi (penalty missed) | | (penalty scored) Li Xuebai; (penalty scored) Yu Tao; (penalty missed) Wang Zhen (penalty scored); (penalty scored) An Qi |

| 26 March | Wuhan Tianlong Huanghelou | 2–1 | Shanghai Jiucheng | Hankou Sports Center, Wuhan |
| 15:30 | Gílson 85', 90' | | Rong Yu 45' |

| 26 March | Shanghai Zobon City | 2–3 | Henan Construction | Yuanshen Sports Centre Stadium, Shanghai |
| 19:45 | Liu Quande 39' (pen.); Baning 83' | | Xue Fei 46', 57' (pen.); Liu Xiang 64' |

- ^1 Liaoning FC advanced to the second round as Harbin Guoli was dissolved on 1 April 2005.

=== Second round ===
==== First leg ====
| 18 June | Zhejiang Babei Greentown | 2–2 | Shanghai Shenhua SVA | Huanglong Stadium, Hangzhou |
| 15:30 | Shen Liuxi 25'; Huang Long 89' | | Li Chengming 72'; Yu Tao 74' |

| 18 June | Henan Construction | 1–0 | Shenzhen Jianlibao | Xinxiang Stadium, Xinxiang |
| 15:30 | Wang Shouwei 71' |

| 18 June | Qingdao Hisense | 1–3 | Dalian Shide | Yizhong Sports Center, Qingdao |
| 15:30 | Nagy 19' | | Ma Shuai 50', 89'; Janković 82' (pen.) |

| 18 June | Liaoning Zhongyu | 1–0 | Dalian Changbo | Tieling Stadium, Tieling |
| 15:30 | Xu Liang 56' |

| 18 June | Guangzhou Sunray Cave | 1–2 | Shandong Luneng Taishan | Tianhe Stadium, Guangzhou |
| 16:10 | Luo Yong 65' (pen.) | | Shu Chang 33'; Han Peng 68' |

| 18 June | Beijing Hyundai | 1–0 | Wuhan Tianlong Huanghelou | Workers Stadium, Beijing |
| 19:30 | Jelić 75' |

| 18 June | Xiamen Blue Lions | 3–0 | Sichuan Guancheng | Quanzhou Sports Center, Quanzhou |
| 19:30 | Ekong 55', 66'; Tian Ye 88' |

| 18 June | Inter Shanghai | 5–1 | Hunan Shoking | Zhabei Stadium, Shanghai |
| 19:45 | Du Ping 38'; Bulat 44' (pen.); Ayew 50', 79'; Wang Yun 75' | | Agbo 55' |

==== Second leg ====
| 25 June | Wuhan Tianlong Huanghelou | 1–1 (1–2 agg.) | Beijing Hyundai | Wuhan Sports Center Stadium, Wuhan |
| 15:45 | Zhang Bin 87' (pen.) | | Xu Yunlong 46' |

| 25 June | Dalian Changbo | 0–2 (0–3 agg.) | Liaoning Zhongyu | Dalian Institute of Light Industry Stadium, Dalian |
| 16:00 | | | Guo Hui 37'; Zhao Junzhe 79' (pen.) |

| 25 June | Hunan Shoking | 0–4 (1–9 agg.) | Inter Shanghai | Liuyang Sports Center, Liuyang |
| 19:30 | | | Yu Hai 13', 31'; Du Ping 17', 21' |

| 25 June | Shanghai Shenhua SVA (a) | 0–0 (2–2 agg.) | Zhejiang Babei Greentown | Zhabei Stadium, Shanghai |
| 19:45 |

| 26 June | Shenzhen Jianlibao | 4–0 (4–1 agg.) | Henan Construction | Bayi Stadium, Nanchang |
| 15:30 | Yang Chen 18', 90'; Wang Xinxin 43'; Zhou Ting 66' (pen.) |

| 26 June | Sichuan Guancheng | 6–3 (6–6 agg.) | Xiamen Blue Lions (a) | Nanchong Sports Center, Nanchong |
| 16:30 | Wang Suolong 35', 55'; Zou Yougen 60', 81'; Zhang Yaokun 67'; Wang Song 77' | | Wei Huiping 5'; Li Kun 30'; Zhao Ming 70' |

| 26 June | Dalian Shide | 5–0 (8–1 agg.) | Qingdao Hisense | Jinzhou Stadium, Dalian |
| 19:00 | Zou Jie 56'; Ji Mingyi 60'; Ma Shuai 62', 79'; Janković 72' |

| 26 June | Shandong Luneng Taishan | 5–2 (7–3 agg.) | Guangzhou Sunray Cave | Shandong Provincial Stadium, Jinan |
| 19:30 | Dănciulescu 40'; Han Peng 55'; Li Jinyu 63', 85'; Zheng Zhi 88' | | Tang Dechao 18'; Liang Shiming 27' |

=== Quarter-finals ===
==== First leg ====
| 24 July | Dalian Shide | 6–2 | Shenzhen Jianlibao | Jinzhou Stadium, Dalian |
| 19:00 | Pantelić 7'; Zou Jie 18', 62'; Quan Lei 36'; Janković 55'; Yan Song 72' | | Huang Yunfeng 73'; Zając 85' |

| 10 August | Liaoning Zhongyu | 0–1 | Xiamen Blue Lions | Leifeng Stadium, Fushun |
| 19:30 | | | Quinzinho 7' |

| 10 August | Beijing Hyundai | 2–0 | Shanghai Shenhua SVA | Workers Stadium, Beijing |
| 19:35 | Gao Dawei 5'; Alexa 65' (pen.) |

| 10 August | Inter Shanghai | 1–2 | Shandong Luneng Taishan | Zhabei Stadium, Shanghai |
| 19:45 | Bulat 88' (pen.) | | Li Jinyu 27'; Lü Zheng 77' |

==== Second leg ====
| 10 August | Shenzhen Jianlibao | 1–0 (3–6 agg.) | Dalian Shide | Shenzhen Stadium, Shenzhen |
| 19:30 | Zhou Ting 57' |

| 7 September | Xiamen Blue Lions | 2–1 (3–1 agg.) | Liaoning Zhongyu | Xiamen Stadium, Xiamen |
| 19:30 | Wei Huiping 71'; Le Beisi 81' | | Wu Gaojun 85' |

| 7 September | Shandong Luneng Taishan | 2–2 (a.e.t.) (4–3 agg.) | Inter Shanghai | Shandong Provincial Stadium, Jinan |
| 19:35 | Li Xiaopeng 45'; Han Peng 104' | | Ayew 1'; Huang Yong 55' |

| 7 September | Shanghai Shenhua SVA | 2–1 (a.e.t.) (2–3 agg.) | Beijing Hyundai | Yuanshen Sports Centre Stadium, Shanghai |
| 19:45 | Xie Hui 21', 27' | | Sui Dongliang 113' |

=== Semi-finals ===
==== First leg ====
| 2 October | Beijing Hyundai | 1–3 | Shandong Luneng Taishan | Workers Stadium, Beijing |
| 15:30 | Jelić 83' (pen.) | | Cui Peng 35'; Lü Zheng 54'; Dănciulescu 90' |

| 2 October | Dalian Shide | 1–1 | Xiamen Blue Lions | Jinzhou Stadium, Dalian |
| 15:30 | Li Ming 89' (pen.) | | Wang Bo 80' |

==== Second leg ====
| 5 October | Shandong Luneng Taishan | 4–3 (7–4 agg.) | Beijing Hyundai | Shandong Provincial Stadium, Jinan |
| 19:35 | Zheng Zhi 32' (pen.); Dănciulescu 45'; Li Xiaopeng 62'; Lü Zheng 65' | | Jelić 48', 69' (pen.); Xu Yunlong 51' |

| 5 October | Xiamen Blue Lions | 0–5 (1–6 agg.) | Dalian Shide | Xiamen Stadium, Xiamen |
| 19:35 | | | Zou Jie 12', 47', 84'; Zhu Ting 74'; Hu Zhaojun 75' |

=== Final ===
The final is a single match, with extra time and penalty shootout if necessary.

20 November
14:00

| Shandong Luneng Taishan | 0–1 | Dalian Shide |
|---|---|---|
| | Report | Ma Shuai 70' |

TEDA Football Stadium, Tianjin
Referee: Chaiwat Kunsuta (Thailand)

| Shandong | Dalian |

Shandong:
| GK | 22 | (China) Yang Cheng |
| RB | 25 | (China) Jiao Zhe |
| CB | 5 | (China) Shu Chang (c) |
| CB | 14 | (China) Yuan Weiwei |
| LB | 3 | (China) Wang Chao |
| DM | 16 | (China) Gao Yao |
| RM | 20 | (China) Cui Peng | | (substituted off) 76' |
| LM | 18 | (China) Zhou Haibin |
| AM | 30 | (China) Wang Yongpo | | (substituted off) 67' |
| FW | 28 | (Romania) Ionel Dănciulescu |
| FW | 6 | (China) Han Peng | (yellow card) 90+3' |
Substitutes used:
| MF | 8 | (China) Li Xiaopeng | | (substituted on) 67' |
| MF | 24 | (China) Lü Zheng | | (substituted on) 76' |
Coach:
(Serbia and Montenegro) Ljubiša Tumbaković

Dalian:
| GK | 1 | (China) Chen Dong |
| RB | 12 | (China) Wang Sheng |
| CB | 5 | (China) Feng Xiaoting |
| CB | 16 | (China) Ji Mingyi (c) |
| LB | 3 | (Brazil) Adilson |
| RM | 14 | (China) Hu Zhaojun | (substituted off) 46' |
| DM | 4 | (China) Zhai Yanpeng | (substituted off) 90' |
| LM | 13 | (China) Quan Lei |
| RW | 9 | (Bulgaria) Zoran Janković |
| LW | 10 | (Serbia and Montenegro) Miodrag Pantelić |
| ST | 8 | (China) Zhu Ting | (substituted off) 63' |
Substitutes used:
| MF | 6 | (China) Li Ming | (substituted on) 46' |
| MF | 7 | (China) Zhao Xuri | (substituted on) 90' |
| FW | 19 | (China) Ma Shuai | (substituted on) 63' |
Coach:
(Serbia and Montenegro) Vladimir Petrović

== See also ==
- 2005 Chinese Super League Cup
