= Wang Tao =

Wang Tao may refer to:

- Wang Tao (translator) (1828–1897), Chinese translator and publisher in Qing Dynasty
- Wang Tao (politician) (1931–2025), Chinese executive and politician
- Wang Tao (archaeologist) (born 1962), Chinese-British archaeologist
- Wang Tao (table tennis) (born 1967), Chinese table tennis player and coach
- Wang Tao (footballer, born 1967), Chinese footballer, player for Beijing Guoan and national team
- Wang Tao (footballer, born 1970), Chinese footballer and chairman of Beijing Baxy
- Wang Tao (footballer, born 1987), Chinese footballer
- Wang Tao (handballer) (born 1957), Chinese handball player
- Wang Tao (skier) (born 1997), Chinese Paralympic Nordic skier
- Wang Tao (sport shooter) (born 1982), Chinese sports shooter
- Tao Wang (economist), Chinese economist
- Frank Wang or Wang Tao, Chinese entrepreneur, founder of DJI
- Taoray Wang or Wang Tao, fashion designer
- Wang Tao, see List of fictional people of the Three Kingdoms#Chapter 109

== See also ==
- Wang Dao (Wang Tao in Wade–Giles), a key official of the early Eastern Jin dynasty
