= 2001 Chinese FA Cup =

2001 The Chinese Football Association Cup
CFA Cup

Tournament details
- Country: China
- Teams: 26

Final positions
- Champions: Dalian Shide (1st title)
- Runners-up: Beijing Guoan

Tournament statistics
- Matches played: 32
- Goals scored: 93 (2.91 per match)
- Top goal scorer(s): (Brazil) Orlando (7 goals)

The Mexin Doors 2001 Chinese FA Cup (Chinese: 2001年美心门中国足球协会杯) was the 7th edition of Chinese FA Cup. The matches of the first round were kicked off on 29 April 2001. The cup title sponsor was Mexin Doors, which was the second title sponsor of the Chinese FA Cup.

== Results ==
=== First round ===
29 April	Yunnan Hongta	3 – 2	Shanghai COSCO Huili	Tuodong Stadium, Kunming
	Kiriakov 6' (pen.), 15' (pen.); Yang Wei 70'		Williams 10', 24'	Referee: Zhang Jianjun

29 April	Dalian Shide	2 – 1	Tianjin Lifei	Jinzhou Stadium, Dalian
	Orlando 65'; Bajčetić 85'		Osmanović 67' (pen.)

29 April	Shenyang Haishi	1 – 1 (a.e.t.) (4 - 3 p)	Shaanxi Guoli	Jinzhou City Stadium, Jinzhou
	Hu Yunfeng 66'		Yu Guang 61'
	Penalties
	(penalty scored) (penalty scored); Li Yong (penalty missed); Caha (penalty scored); Zhang Yang (penalty scored)		(penalty scored) Douglas; (penalty scored) Renato; (penalty missed) Zhao Honglüe; (penalty missed) Zhu Yongsheng (penalty scored)

29 April	Shanghai Shenhua	2 – 2 (a.e.t.) (3 - 4 p)	Qingdao Hainiu	Hongkou Football Stadium, Shanghai
16:00	Qi Hong 34'; Qu Shengqing 75'		Emerson 45+2', 78'	Referee: Lu Jun
	Penalties
	Ranković (penalty missed); Mao Yijun (penalty scored); Zhang Yong (penalty scored); Bian Jun (penalty missed); Qu Shengqing (penalty scored); Xin Feng (penalty missed)		(penalty missed) Liu Jun; (penalty scored) Emerson; (penalty missed) Zhang Weihua; (penalty scored) Paulista; (penalty scored) Xiao Zhanbo; (penalty scored) Cui Xiaojia

29 April	Guangdong Hongyuan	3 – 0	Sichuan Quanxing	Guizhou Provincial Stadium, Guiyang
	Yao Debiao 14', 79'; Li Haiqiang 39'

29 April	Mianyang Taiji	3 – 0	Zhejiang Greentown	Mianyang Nanhe Sports Centre Stadium, Mianyang
	Bai Jianqiu 53', 78'; Yan Xiao 72'

29 April	Jiangsu Sainty	2 – 0	Bayi	Wuxi Sports Center, Wuxi
	Wu Jun 42' (pen.); Rodrigues 64'			Referee: Zhang Baohua

29 April	Shenzhen Kejian	2 – 1	Guangzhou Geely	Shenzhen Stadium, Shenzhen
	Tiago 44', 57'		Yuan Junhui 67'

29 April	Tianjin Teda	2 – 1 (a.e.t.)	Chengdu Wuniu	Minyuan Stadium, Tianjin
	Souza 19'; Chen Licheng 112'		Azas 45+1' (pen.)

29 April	Xiamen Hongshi	0 – 1	Henan Construction	Xiamen Stadium, Xiamen
			Lin Jianwei 60'

=== Second round ===
26 May	Yunnan Hongta	0 – 1	Beijing Guoan	Tuodong Stadium, Kunming
			Georgiev 63'	Referee: Huang Junjie

26 May	Liaoning FC	2 – 3	Tianjin Teda	Daqing Stadium, Daqing
	Bai Guanghai 15'; Zhao Junzhe 58' (pen.)		Gao Feng 65'; Arturi 76'; Yu Genwei 80'	Referee: Sun Baojie

26 May	Shenyang Haishi	2 – 2 (a.e.t.) (7 - 8 p)	Shenzhen Kejian	Anshan Stadium, Anshan
	Mimboe 19' (pen.); Hu Yunfeng 34'		Prtenjača 18'; Tiago 79'
	Penalties
	(penalty scored) (penalty scored) (penalty scored) (penalty scored) (penalty scored) (penalty scored) (penalty scored); Fu Jia (penalty missed)		(penalty scored) (penalty scored) (penalty scored) (penalty scored) (penalty scored) (penalty scored) (penalty scored); (penalty scored) Yang Guang

26 May	Wuhan Hongjinlong	1 – 0	Jiangsu Sainty	Xianning Stadium, Xianning
	Zheng Bin 56'

26 May	Qingdao Hainiu	3 – 1	Chongqing Lifan	Zibo Sports Center Stadium, Zibo
	Xiao Zhanbo 18'; Liu Jun 55'; Emerson 90+'		Li Guoxu 45+2'

26 May	Henan Construction	1 – 3	Dalian Shide	Luohe Sports Centre Stadium, Luohe
	Ivan 53'		Orlando 24'; Hao Haidong 44', 81' (pen.)	Referee: Chen Guoqiang

26 May	Changchun Yatai	1 – 0	Guangdong Hongyuan	Changchun Stadium, Changchun
	Alassane 1'

26 May	Mianyang Taiji	0 – 4	Shandong Luneng Taishan	Mianyang Nanhe Sports Centre Stadium, Mianyang
			Song Lihui 3'; Nahornyak 50', 55', 68'	Referee: Chen Guoqiang

=== Third round ===
==== First leg ====
29 July	Changchun Yatai	2 – 1	Shandong Luneng Taishan	Changchun Stadium, Changchun
	Li Hongzheng 17'; Jiang Pengxiang 84'		Casiano 22'	Referee: Zhang Yerui

29 July	Beijing Guoan	2 – 1	Shenzhen Kejian	Workers Stadium, Beijing
19:00	Tian Ye 33'; Wang Tao 51' (pen.)		Tiago 13'	Referee: Zhang Baohua

29 July	Dalian Shide	5 – 2	Qingdao Hainiu	Jinzhou Stadium, Dalian
19:30	Wang Peng 11', 28'; Orlando 17', 42'; Yan Song 89'		Emerson 75'; Carreño 85'	Referee: Sun Baojie

29 July	Tianjin Teda	2 – 1	Wuhan Hongjinlong	Minyuan Stadium, Tianjin
	Chen Licheng 64'; Gao Feng 83'		Dapueto 36'

==== Second leg ====
5 August	Shenzhen Kejian	1 – 1 (2 - 3 agg.)	Beijing Guoan	Shenzhen Stadium, Shenzhen
	Yang Guang 5'		Tian Ye 15'

5 August	Shandong Luneng Taishan	3 – 1 (4 - 3 agg.)	Changchun Yatai	Tai'an Sports Center Stadium, Tai'an
16:00	Casiano 25'; Nahornyak 39' (pen.), 60' (pen.)		Wang Dong 44'	Referee: Zhang Baohua

5 August	Qingdao Hainiu	0 – 3 (2 - 8 agg.)	Dalian Shide	Zibo Stadium, Zibo
16:00			Sun Zhi 31'; Zhu Guanghui 70'; Ma Yongkang 75' (o.g.)

5 August	Wuhan Hongjinlong	1 – 0 (2 - 2 agg.)	Tianjin Teda	Jingzhou Stadium, Jingzhou
16:00	Rodrigo 74' (pen.)

=== Semi-finals ===
==== First leg ====
2 September	Wuhan Hongjinlong	0 – 0	Beijing Guoan	Xiaogan Stadium, Xiaogan
16:00

5 September	Dalian Shide	3 – 1	Shandong Luneng Taishan	Jinzhou Stadium, Dalian
19:00	Orlando 9', 90'; Bajčetić 83'		Song Lihui 46'	Referee: Zhang Yerui

==== Second leg ====
9 September	Beijing Guoan	3 – 1 (3 - 1 agg.)	Wuhan Hongjinlong	Olympic Sports Centre, Beijing
16:00	Xue Shen 50'; Georgiev 63'; Shang Yi 45+2'		Zhang Bin 61'

9 September	Shandong Luneng Taishan	1 – 1 (2 - 4 agg.)	Dalian Shide	Tai'an Sports Center Stadium, Tai'an
16:00	Song Lihui 58'		Zou Jie 73'	Referee: Sun Baojie

=== Finals ===
==== First leg ====
23 December	Beijing Guoan	0 – 1	Dalian Shide	Workers Stadium, Beijing
14:00			Li Ming 30'	Referee: Kwon Jong-chul (Korea Republic)

==== Second leg ====
30 December	Dalian Shide	2 – 1 (3 - 1 agg.)	Beijing Guoan	Dalian People's Stadium, Dalian
14:00	Orlando 48'; Bajčetić 81'		Xu Yunlong 54'
