= 1992 AFC Asian Cup squads =

Squad lists of 1992 AFC Asian Cup national teams

Squads for the 1992 AFC Asian Cup played in Japan.

== Group A ==
=== Iran ===
Manager: Ali Parvin

No.	Pos.	Player	Date of birth (age)	Caps	Goals	Club
1	GK	Ahmad Reza Abedzadeh	25 May 1966 (aged 26)			(Football Federation Islamic Republic of Iran) Esteghlal
2	DF	Javad Zarincheh	23 July 1966 (aged 26)			(Football Federation Islamic Republic of Iran) Keshavarz
3	DF	Mojtaba Moharrami	16 April 1962 (aged 30)			(Football Federation Islamic Republic of Iran) Persepolis
4	DF	Reza Hassanzadeh	30 December 1964 (aged 27)			(Football Federation Islamic Republic of Iran) Esteghlal
5	DF	Nader Mohammadkhani	23 August 1963 (aged 29)			(Football Federation Islamic Republic of Iran) Keshavarz
6	MF	Mehdi Fonounizadeh	19 May 1962 (aged 30)			(Football Federation Islamic Republic of Iran) Bank Tejarat
7	MF	Hamid Reza Estili	4 January 1967 (aged 25)			(Football Federation Islamic Republic of Iran) Persepolis
8	MF	Sirous Ghayeghran (c)	22 September 1962 (aged 30)			(Football Federation Islamic Republic of Iran) Keshavarz
9	MF	Seyed Mehdi Abtahi	2 March 1963 (aged 29)			(Football Federation Islamic Republic of Iran) Vahdat
10	FW	Samad Marfavi	18 May 1965 (aged 27)			(Football Federation Islamic Republic of Iran) Esteghlal
11	FW	Jamshid Shahmohammadi	2 July 1968 (aged 24)			(Football Federation Islamic Republic of Iran) Keshavarz
12	DF	Reza Rezaeimanesh	22 June 1969 (aged 23)			(Football Federation Islamic Republic of Iran) Pas Tehran
13	FW	Mohsen Ashouri	2 January 1965 (aged 27)			(Qatar Football Association) Al-Itihhad
14	MF	Morteza Kermani Moghaddam	11 July 1965 (aged 27)			(Qatar Football Association) Al-Itihhad
15	DF	Mohammad Khakpour	20 February 1969 (aged 23)			(Football Federation Islamic Republic of Iran) Persepolis
16	MF	Seyed Ali Eftekhari	29 June 1965 (aged 27)			(Football Federation Islamic Republic of Iran) Keshavarz
17	FW	Farshad Pious	12 January 1962 (aged 30)			(Football Federation Islamic Republic of Iran) Persepolis
18	FW	Ali Akbar Yousefi	12 September 1969 (aged 23)			(Football Federation Islamic Republic of Iran) Pas Tehran
19	FW	Arash Noamouz	6 June 1967 (aged 25)			(Football Federation Islamic Republic of Iran) Pas Tehran
20	GK	Behzad Gholampour	5 August 1966 (aged 26)			(Football Federation Islamic Republic of Iran) Pas Tehran

=== Japan ===
Head coach: (Netherlands) Hans Ooft

No.	Pos.	Player	Date of birth (age)	Caps	Goals	Club
1	GK	Shigetatsu Matsunaga	12 August 1962 (aged 30)		0	(Japan Football Association) Yokohama Marinos
2	DF	Naoto Otake	18 October 1968 (aged 24)	0	0	(Japan Football Association) Yokohama Flugels
3	DF	Toshinobu Katsuya	2 September 1961 (aged 31)		0	(Japan Football Association) Yokohama Marinos
4	DF	Takumi Horiike	6 September 1965 (aged 27)		1	(Japan Football Association) Shimizu S-Pulse
5	DF	Tetsuji Hashiratani (c)	15 July 1964 (aged 28)		3	(Japan Football Association) Verdy Kawasaki
6	DF	Satoshi Tsunami	14 August 1961 (aged 31)		2	(Japan Football Association) Verdy Kawasaki
7	DF	Masami Ihara	18 September 1967 (aged 25)		0	(Japan Football Association) Yokohama Marinos
8	FW	Masahiro Fukuda	27 December 1966 (aged 25)			(Japan Football Association) Urawa Reds
9	FW	Nobuhiro Takeda	10 May 1967 (aged 25)		1	(Japan Football Association) Verdy Kawasaki
10	MF	Ruy Ramos	9 February 1957 (aged 35)		0	(Japan Football Association) Verdy Kawasaki
11	FW	Kazuyoshi Miura	26 February 1967 (aged 25)			(Japan Football Association) Verdy Kawasaki
12	MF	Takahiro Yamada	29 April 1972 (aged 20)	0	0	(Japan Football Association) Yokohama Marinos
13	DF	Yuji Sakakura	7 June 1967 (aged 25)	6	0	(Japan Football Association) JEF United Ichihara
14	MF	Tsuyoshi Kitazawa	10 August 1968 (aged 24)			(Japan Football Association) Verdy Kawasaki
15	MF	Mitsunori Yoshida	8 March 1962 (aged 30)		1	(Japan Football Association) Yamaha
16	FW	Masashi Nakayama	23 September 1967 (aged 25)			(Japan Football Association) Yamaha
17	MF	Hajime Moriyasu	23 August 1968 (aged 24)		0	(Japan Football Association) Sanfrecce Hiroshima
18	FW	Takuya Jinno	1 June 1970 (aged 22)	0	0	(Japan Football Association) Yokohama Marinos
19	GK	Kazuya Maekawa	22 March 1968 (aged 24)	1	0	(Japan Football Association) Sanfrecce Hiroshima
20	FW	Takuya Takagi	12 November 1967 (aged 24)			(Japan Football Association) Sanfrecce Hiroshima

=== North Korea ===
Head coach: Hong Hyon-chol

No.	Pos.	Player	Date of birth (age)	Caps	Goals	Club
1	GK	Kim Chang-uk	23 January 1971 (aged 21)			(DPR Korea Football Association)
2	DF	Kim Kwang-min	16 August 1962 (aged 30)			(DPR Korea Football Association)
3	MF	O Yong-nam	10 September 1960 (aged 32)			(DPR Korea Football Association)
4	DF	Kim Kyong-il	10 October 1970 (aged 22)			(DPR Korea Football Association)
5	DF	Rim Hwa-young	22 December 1972 (aged 19)			(DPR Korea Football Association)
6	MF	Ryu Song-gun	16 December 1972 (aged 19)			(DPR Korea Football Association)
7	FW	Bae Jong-min	13 February 1971 (aged 21)			(DPR Korea Football Association)
9	MF	Yun Jong-su	3 January 1962 (aged 30)			(DPR Korea Football Association)
10	FW	Choi Won-nam	5 October 1969 (aged 23)			(DPR Korea Football Association)
11	MF	Gong Mun-chol	16 August 1967 (aged 25)			(DPR Korea Football Association)
12	DF	Tak Yong-bin	23 July 1962 (aged 30)			(DPR Korea Football Association)
13	DF	Cho In-chol	2 October 1973 (aged 19)			(DPR Korea Football Association)
14	FW	Choi Yong-son	10 October 1972 (aged 20)			(DPR Korea Football Association)
15	MF	Ri Yong-rin	26 January 1971 (aged 21)			(DPR Korea Football Association)
16	FW	Kim Jong-song	23 April 1964 (aged 28)			(Japan Football Association) Zainichi Chosen
17	MF	Pang Gwang-chol	27 September 1970 (aged 22)			(DPR Korea Football Association)
18	GK	Kim Yong-ho	2 September 1964 (aged 28)			(DPR Korea Football Association)
20	DF	U Hong-chol	8 April 1965 (aged 27)			(DPR Korea Football Association)

=== United Arab Emirates ===
Head coach: (Ukraine) Valery Lobanovsky

No.	Pos.	Player	Date of birth (age)	Caps	Goals	Club
1	GK	Juma Saedd Aleed	15 October 1972 (aged 20)			(United Arab Emirates Football Association) Baniyas
2	DF	Eissa Meer	7 September 1967 (aged 25)			(United Arab Emirates Football Association) Sharjah
3	DF	Ibrahim Meer	12 June 1967 (aged 25)			(United Arab Emirates Football Association) Sharjah
4	DF	Abdulrahman Al-Haddad	23 March 1966 (aged 26)			(United Arab Emirates Football Association) Sharjah
5	MF	Yousuf Hussain Mohamed	8 July 1965 (aged 27)			(United Arab Emirates Football Association) Sharjah
6	DF	Ismail Rashid Ismail	27 October 1972 (aged 20)			(United Arab Emirates Football Association) Al-Wasl
7	MF	Bakheet Saad Mubarak	15 October 1970 (aged 22)			(United Arab Emirates Football Association) Al-Shabab AC
8	MF	Khalid Ismaïl	7 July 1965 (aged 27)			(United Arab Emirates Football Association) Al-Nasr
9	MF	Nasir Khamees	2 August 1965 (aged 27)			(United Arab Emirates Football Association) Al-Wasl
10	FW	Adnan Al Talyani	30 October 1964 (aged 27)			(United Arab Emirates Football Association) Al Shaab
11	FW	Zuhair Bakhit	13 July 1967 (aged 25)			(United Arab Emirates Football Association) Al-Wasl
12	MF	Hussain Ghuloum	24 September 1969 (aged 23)			(United Arab Emirates Football Association) Sharjah
14	FW	Khamees Saad Mubarak	4 October 1970 (aged 22)			(United Arab Emirates Football Association) Al-Shabab
15	FW	Salem Jawhar Salmeen	25 June 1971 (aged 21)			(United Arab Emirates Football Association)
16	MF	Abdul Razzaq Ibrahim	20 January 1967 (aged 25)			(United Arab Emirates Football Association) Al-Ahli
17	GK	Muhsin Musabah	1 October 1964 (aged 28)			(United Arab Emirates Football Association) Sharjah
18	DF	Abdul Hakim Salem				(United Arab Emirates Football Association)
19	DF	Awadh Ghareeb Mubarak	27 August 1969 (aged 23)			(United Arab Emirates Football Association) Al-Ain
20	DF	Obaid Ali Madani	23 October 1964 (aged 28)			(United Arab Emirates Football Association) Al-Ain
22	GK	Abdulqadir Hassan	15 April 1962 (aged 28)			(United Arab Emirates Football Association) Al-Shabab

== Group B ==
=== China ===
Head coach: (Germany) Klaus Schlappner

No.	Pos.	Player	Date of birth (age)	Caps	Goals	Club
1	GK	Fu Yubin	9 August 1963 (aged 29)			(Chinese Football Association) Liaoning
2	DF	Feng Zhigang	27 February 1969 (aged 23)			(Chinese Football Association) Hubei FC
3	DF	Dong Liqiang	2 April 1965 (aged 27)			(Chinese Football Association) Liaoning
4	DF	Fan Zhiyi	6 November 1969 (aged 22)			(Chinese Football Association) Shanghai
5	DF	Xu Hong	14 May 1968 (aged 24)			(Chinese Football Association) Dalian
6	MF	Li Bing	16 March 1969 (aged 23)			(Chinese Football Association) Liaoning
7	MF	Wu Qunli	20 March 1960 (aged 32)			(Chinese Football Association) Guangzhou
8	FW	Gao Hongbo	25 January 1966 (aged 26)			(Chinese Football Association) Beijing
9	FW	Hao Haidong	25 August 1970 (aged 22)			(Chinese Football Association) Bayi
10	FW	Cai Sheng	12 November 1971 (aged 20)			(Chinese Football Association) Hubei FC
11	FW	Li Xiao	17 July 1967 (aged 25)			(Chinese Football Association) Shanghai
12	MF	Xie Yuxin	12 October 1968 (aged 24)			(Chinese Football Association) Guangdong
13	MF	Li Ming	26 January 1971 (aged 21)			(Chinese Football Association) Dalian
14	MF	Gao Zhongxun	4 January 1965 (aged 27)			(Chinese Football Association) Jilin
15	DF	Zhao Lin	15 February 1966 (aged 26)			(Chinese Football Association) Dalian
16	DF	Jia Xiuquan	9 November 1963 (aged 28)			(Chinese Football Association) Bayi
17	MF	Peng Weiguo	3 October 1971 (aged 21)			(Chinese Football Association) Guangzhou
18	MF	Cheng Yaodong	6 June 1967 (aged 25)			(Chinese Football Association) Shanghai
19	DF	Zhu Bo	23 May 1960 (aged 32)			(Chinese Football Association) Bayi
20	GK	Ou Chuliang	26 August 1968 (aged 24)			(Chinese Football Association) Guangdong

=== Qatar ===
Head coach: (Brazil) Sebastião Lapola

No.	Pos.	Player	Date of birth (age)	Caps	Goals	Club
1	GK	Younes Ahmed	17 August 1963 (aged 29)			(Qatar Football Association) Al Rayyan SC
2	DF	Hamad Mubarak Al-Attiya	22 August 1972 (aged 20)			(Qatar Football Association) Al Rayyan SC
3	MF	Zamel Al-Kuwari	27 September 1972 (aged 20)			(Qatar Football Association) Al Sadd SC
4	DF	Yousuf Al-Adsani	12 October 1965 (aged 27)			(Qatar Football Association) Al Sadd SC
5	DF	Adel Malalla	15 September 1961 (aged 31)			(Qatar Football Association) Al Ahli SC
6	MF	Waleed Maayof	29 November 1972 (aged 19)			(Qatar Football Association) Qatar SC
7	MF	Adel Mubarak Khamis	11 November 1965 (aged 26)			(Qatar Football Association) Al Ittihad SC
8	MF	Fahad Al Kuwari	19 December 1968 (aged 23)			(Qatar Football Association) Al Sadd SC
9	GK	Ahmed Khalil Al-Khaldi	17 October 1972 (aged 20)			(Qatar Football Association) Al Arabi
10	MF	Mubarak Salem Al-Khater	25 May 1966 (aged 26)			(Qatar Football Association) Al Rayyan SC
11	FW	Adel Al Mulla	7 December 1970 (aged 21)			(Qatar Football Association) Al Rayyan SC
12	FW	Mahmoud Soufi	20 October 1971 (aged 21)			(Qatar Football Association) Al Ittihad SC
13	MF	Abdulnasser Al-Obaidly	2 October 1972 (aged 20)			(Qatar Football Association) Al Sadd SC
14	DF	Juma Salem Johar	20 August 1970 (aged 22)			(Qatar Football Association) Al Wakra
15	MF	Jafal Rashed Al-Kuwari	27 September 1973 (aged 19)			(Qatar Football Association) Al Sadd
16	DF	Khalid Khamis Al-Sulaiti	11 January 1970 (aged 22)			(Qatar Football Association) Al Sadd
17	GK	Amer Al Kaabi	20 May 1971 (aged 21)			(Qatar Football Association) Al Ahli SC
18	MF	Abdulaziz Hassan Bujaloof	17 June 1970 (aged 22)			(Qatar Football Association) Qatar SC
19	DF	Rashid Shami Suwaid	5 September 1973 (aged 19)			(Qatar Football Association) Al Rayyan SC
20	FW	Mubarak Mustafa	30 March 1973 (aged 19)			(Qatar Football Association) Al-Arabi SC

=== Saudi Arabia ===
Head coach: (Brazil) Nelsinho Rosa

No.	Pos.	Player	Date of birth (age)	Caps	Club
1	GK	Saud Al-Otaibi	3 November 1969 (aged 22)		(Saudi Arabia) Al Shabab
2	DF	Abdullah Al-Dosari	1 November 1969 (aged 22)		(Saudi Arabia) Al-Ittifaq
3	MF	Salem Al-Alawi	21 August 1973 (aged 19)		(Saudi Arabia) Al Qadisyah
4	DF	Abdul Rahman Al-Roomi	28 October 1969 (aged 23)		(Saudi Arabia) Al Shabab
5	DF	Mohammed Al-Khilaiwi	1 September 1971 (aged 21)		(Saudi Arabia) Al Ittihad
6	MF	Fuad Anwar (c)	13 October 1970 (aged 22)		(Saudi Arabia) Al Shabab
7	MF	Saeed Al-Owairan	17 August 1967 (aged 25)		(Saudi Arabia) Al Shabab
8	MF	Fahad Al-Bishi	10 September 1965 (aged 27)		(Saudi Arabia) Al Nassr
9	FW	Hamzah Falatah	8 October 1972 (aged 20)		(Saudi Arabia) Ohod Club
10	FW	Naser Al-Qahtani	24 July 1974 (aged 18)		(Saudi Arabia) Al-Rawdhah
11	FW	Fahad Mehallel	11 November 1970 (aged 21)		(Saudi Arabia) Al Shabab
12	DF	Awad Al-Anazi	24 September 1968 (aged 24)		(Saudi Arabia) Al Shabab
14	MF	Khalid Al-Muwallid	23 November 1971 (aged 20)		(Saudi Arabia) Al-Ahli
15	MF	Youssif Al-Thunian	18 November 1963 (aged 28)		(Saudi Arabia) Al-Hilal
16	MF	Khaled Al-Hazaa	2 December 1971 (aged 20)		(Saudi Arabia) Al Nassr
17	DF	Abdullah Al-Shreidah Al-Dosari	23 November 1970 (aged 21)		(Saudi Arabia) Al Qadisyah
18	DF	Saleh Al-Dawod	24 September 1968 (aged 24)		(Saudi Arabia) Al Shabab
19	MF	Hamzah Saleh	19 April 1967 (aged 25)		(Saudi Arabia) Al-Ahli
20	FW	Abdulaziz Al-Razqan	3 October 1970 (aged 22)		(Saudi Arabia) Al Shabab
21	GK	Shaker Al-Shujaa	2 August 1972 (aged 20)		(Saudi Arabia) Al Nassr
22	GK	Fouad Al-Mugahwi	11 October 1970 (aged 22)		(Saudi Arabia) Al-Ittifaq

=== Thailand ===
Head coach: (Germany) Peter Stubbe

No.	Pos.	Player	Date of birth (age)	Caps	Goals	Club
1	GK	Poomeat Hungsuwannakool	12 February 1974 (aged 18)			(Football Association of Thailand) Royal Thai Police FC
2	DF	Sumet Akarapong	6 July 1971 (aged 21)			(Football Association of Thailand) Bangkok Bank
3	DF	Cherdchai Suwannang	25 September 1969 (aged 23)			(Football Association of Thailand) Bangkok Bank
4	DF	Surasak Tungsurat	1 January 1965 (aged 27)			(Football Association of Thailand) Rajnavy
5	DF	Pairote Puangchan	16 December 1966 (aged 25)			(Football Association of Thailand) Royal Thai Air Force
6	MF	Kosol Jantrachart	26 December 1966 (aged 25)			(Football Association of Thailand) Port Authority of Thailand
7	DF	Natee Thongsookkaew	9 December 1966 (aged 25)			(Football Association of Thailand) Royal Thai Police FC
8	MF	Anun Punsan	10 August 1966 (aged 26)			(Football Association of Thailand) Rajpracha
9	FW	Kajohn Punnaves	10 February 1964 (aged 28)			(Football Association of Thailand) Royal Thai Police FC
10	FW	Thanis Areesngarkul	12 August 1962 (aged 30)			(Football Association of Thailand) Osotsapa
11	FW	Songserm Maperm	12 March 1966 (aged 26)			(Football Association of Thailand) Royal Thai Air Force
12	MF	Surachai Jaturapattarapong	20 November 1969 (aged 22)			(Football Association of Thailand) Thai Farmers Bank FC
13	MF	Nantapreecha Kamnaeng	1 April 1967 (aged 25)			(Football Association of Thailand) Bangkok Bank
14	FW	Vithoon Kijmongkolsak	21 June 1962 (aged 30)			(Football Association of Thailand) Royal Thai Police FC
15	MF	Attaphol Buspakom	1 October 1962 (aged 30)			(Football Association of Thailand) Port Authority of Thailand
16	FW	Narong Poopriboon	7 September 1965 (aged 27)			(Football Association of Thailand) Port Authority of Thailand
17	FW	Adul Maliphun	10 August 1972 (aged 20)			(Football Association of Thailand) Royal Thai Army
18	GK	Chaiyong Khumpiam	29 August 1965 (aged 27)			(Football Association of Thailand) Royal Thai Police FC
19	FW	Praphan Khunkokeroad	28 May 1973 (aged 19)			(Football Association of Thailand) Bangkok Bank
20	GK	Kumpanat Aungsoongnern	15 August 1966 (aged 26)			(Football Association of Thailand) Royal Thai Air Force
