= Zhai =

Zhai/Dí (翟)
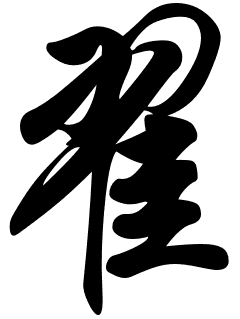
- Pronunciation: Zhái/Dí (Mandarin); Chak (Cantonese)
- Language: Chinese

Origin
- Language: Old Chinese

Other names
- Variant forms: Chai, Chak, Tjer

Zhai (sometimes references as Di) is the Mandarin pinyin romanization of the Chinese surname written 翟 in Chinese character. It is romanized Chai in Wade–Giles, and Chak in Cantonese. It is listed 292nd in the Song dynasty classic text Hundred Family Surnames. As of 2008, it is the 120th most common surname in China, shared by 1.4 million people.

== Notable people ==
- Zhai Huang (翟璜; fl. 4th century BC), Prime Minister of Marquess Wen of Wei
- Zhai Fangjin (翟方進; died 7 AD), Prime Minister of the Han dynasty
- Zhai Liao (died 391), founder of the Zhai Wei state
- Zhai Zhao (died 393), son of Zhai Liao, the second and final ruler of Zhai Wei
- Zhai Rang (died 617), Sui dynasty rebel leader
- Zhai Wang (翟汪; 1877–1941), Republic of China politician, Governor of Guangdong province
- Zhai Wenxuan (翟文選; 1878–1950), Republic of China politician, Governor of Liaoning province
- Zhai Yiwo (翟一我; 1921–2007), journalist and translator
- Zhai Yusheng (翟裕生; born 1930), geologist
- Zhai Xiangjun (1939–2019), translator and educator
- Zhai Wanchen (翟万臣; born 1949), actor
- Zhai Zhenhua (born 1951), writer
- Zhai Jun (born 1954), Chinese ambassador to France
- Zhai Yongming (born 1955), poet
- Zhai Zhigang (born 1966), astronaut
- Zhai Chao (born 1971), female Olympic handball player
- Zhai Yanpeng (born 1982), football player
- William Chak or Zhai Weilian (born 1985), Hong Kong actor
- Zhai Ling (翟凌; born 1987), model
- Zhai Tianlin (born 1987), actor
- Chak Ting Fung or Zhai Tingfeng (born 1989), Hong Kong football player
- Zhai Xiaochuan (born 1993), Chinese basketball player
- Zhai Siming (born 1996), Singaporean actor
