= Sun Shoubo =

Chinese footballer

Sun Shoubo 孙寿博
Personal information
- Date of birth: June 11, 1983 (age 43)
- Place of birth: Dalian, Liaoning, China
- Height: 1.88 m (6 ft 2 in)
- Position: Goalkeeper

Senior career*
| Years | Team | Apps | (Gls) |
| 2001–2003 | Dalian Sidelong | 26 | (0) |
| 2004 | Sichuan First City | 16 | (0) |
| 2005–2012 | Dalian Shide | 108 | (0) |
| 2013–2021 | Wuhan Zall | 113 | (0) |
- * Club domestic league appearances and goals as of 31 December 2020

Sun Shoubo (simplified Chinese: 孙寿博; traditional Chinese: 孫壽博; pinyin: Sūn Shòubó; born June 11, 1983, in Dalian, Liaoning) is a Chinese former football player who played as a goalkeeper.

== Club career ==
=== Dalian Sidelong ===
Sun Shoubo started his professional football career in 2001 when he played for Dalian Sidelong who were in the third tier of the Chinese league system. With them he would help see them win promotion to the second tier as well as starting to establish himself within the team. At the beginning of the 2003 league season Sun Shoubo would now establish himself as Dalian Sidelong's first choice goalkeeper but would have to move to Zhuhai to further his career when Dalian Sidelong moved and renamed themselves Zhuhai Anping.

=== Sichuan First City ===
With the chance to play in the top tier Sun Shoubo would transfer to Sichuan First City at the beginning of the 2004 Chinese Super League season. He would immediately establish himself as their first choice goalkeeper when he made his debut in the first game of the season on May 16, 2004, against Beijing Hyundai in a 1–1 draw. While he was an integral part of the team that finished ninth within the league Sun Shoubo would only stay with Sichuan Guancheng for one season after Dalian Shide showed an interest in him.

=== Dalian Shide ===
With the chance to return home to Dalian, Sun Shoubo would transfer to Dalian Shide in the 2005 Chinese Super League season to play as an understudy to Chen Dong. He would not have to wait long before he made his debut coming on as a substitute for an injured Chen Dong on April 17, 2005, in a game against Shanghai Zobon, which Dalian won 1–0. For several more league games he would remain in goal to play his part in Dalian's title winning team before Chen Dong would return from injury and regain his place in goal. For several further seasons Sun Shoubo would remain as Dalian's second choice goalkeeper until the 2008 Chinese Super League season saw Dalian flirt with relegation and Chen Dong getting injured in a game against Henan Construction on October 2, 2008, saw Sun Shoubo step up and establish himself as their first choice goalkeeper despite Dalian losing 3-0.

=== Wuhan Zall ===
Sun moved to join Wuhan Zall in 2013, after Dalian Shide dissolved. He stayed until 2021, when he announced his retirement, and became the assistant goalkeeping coach for the team.

== Career statistics ==
Statistics accurate as of match played 31 December 2020.

Appearances and goals by club, season and competition
| Club | Season | League | | | National Cup | | League Cup | | Continental | | Total | |
| Club | Season | Division | Apps | Goals | Apps | Goals | Apps | Goals | Apps | Goals | Apps | Goals |
|---|---|---|---|---|---|---|---|---|---|---|---|---|
| Dalian Sidelong | 2001 | Yi League | 0 | 0 | - | | - | | - | | 0 | 0 |
| Dalian Sidelong | 2002 | Jia B League | 0 | 0 | | 0 | - | | - | | 0 | 0 |
| Dalian Sidelong | 2003 | Jia B League | 26 | 0 | 1 | 0 | - | | - | | 26 | 0 |
| Dalian Sidelong | Total | | 26 | 0 | 1 | 0 | 0 | 0 | 0 | 0 | 27 | 0 |
| Sichuan First City | 2004 | Chinese Super League | 16 | 0 | 1 | 0 | | 0 | - | | 17 | 0 |
| Dalian Shide | 2005 | Chinese Super League | 7 | 0 | 0 | 0 | | 0 | - | | 7 | 0 |
| Dalian Shide | 2006 | Chinese Super League | 1 | 0 | 0 | 0 | - | | | 0 | 1 | 0 |
| Dalian Shide | 2007 | Chinese Super League | 8 | 0 | - | | - | | - | | 8 | 0 |
| Dalian Shide | 2008 | Chinese Super League | 11 | 0 | - | | - | | - | | 11 | 0 |
| Dalian Shide | 2009 | Chinese Super League | 30 | 0 | - | | - | | - | | 30 | 0 |
| Dalian Shide | 2010 | Chinese Super League | 22 | 0 | - | | - | | - | | 22 | 0 |
| Dalian Shide | 2011 | Chinese Super League | 27 | 0 | 0 | 0 | - | | - | | 27 | 0 |
| Dalian Shide | 2012 | Chinese Super League | 2 | 0 | 0 | 0 | - | | - | | 2 | 0 |
| Dalian Shide | Total | | 108 | 0 | 0 | 0 | 0 | 0 | 0 | 0 | 108 | 0 |
| Wuhan Zall | 2013 | Chinese Super League | 1 | 0 | 1 | 0 | - | | - | | 2 | 0 |
| Wuhan Zall | 2014 | China League One | 1 | 0 | 0 | 0 | - | | - | | 1 | 0 |
| Wuhan Zall | 2015 | China League One | 30 | 0 | 0 | 0 | - | | - | | 30 | 0 |
| Wuhan Zall | 2016 | China League One | 28 | 0 | 0 | 0 | - | | - | | 28 | 0 |
| Wuhan Zall | 2017 | China League One | 25 | 0 | 0 | 0 | - | | - | | 25 | 0 |
| Wuhan Zall | 2018 | China League One | 27 | 0 | 0 | 0 | - | | - | | 27 | 0 |
| Wuhan Zall | 2019 | Chinese Super League | 1 | 0 | 1 | 0 | - | | - | | 2 | 0 |
| Wuhan Zall | 2020 | Chinese Super League | 0 | 0 | 1 | 0 | - | | 0 (Note: Appearance(s) in CSL Relegation play-offs) | 0 | 1 | 0 |
| Wuhan Zall | Total | | 113 | 0 | 3 | 0 | 0 | 0 | 0 | 0 | 116 | 0 |
| Career total | | | 263 | 0 | 5 | 0 | 0 | 0 | 0 | 0 | 268 | 0 |

== Honours ==
=== Club ===
Dalian Shide

- Chinese Super League: 2005
- Chinese FA Cup: 2005

Wuhan Zall

- China League One: 2018
