= Kim Kyong-il =

Kim Kyong-il is the name of:

- Kim Kyong-il (footballer, born 1970), North Korean footballer
- Kim Kyong-il (footballer, born 1988), North Korean footballer
