= Zhao Lin =

Zhao Lin is the name of:

- Zhao Yan (Later Liang) (died 923), Later Liang politician known as Zhao Lin during his youth
- Zhao Lin (politician) (1906–2003), People's Republic of China politician
- Zhao Lin (footballer) (born 1966), retired Chinese association footballer

== See also ==
- Lin Zhao (1932–1968), Chinese dissident
