= Liu Yu (footballer) =

Chinese footballer

Liu Yu 刘宇
Personal information
- Date of birth: May 12, 1985 (age 41)
- Place of birth: Chengdu, Sichuan, China
- Height: 1.80 m (5 ft 11 in)
- Position: Defender

Senior career*
Years	Team	Apps	(Gls)
2004–2005	Sichuan First City	34	(0)
2006–2007	Dalian Shide	36	(0)
2008	Henan Construction	19	(0)
2009–2011	Chengdu Blades	60	(1)
2011	Jiangsu Sainty	9	(0)
2012–2013	Dalian Aerbin	23	(1)
2014–2018	Chongqing Lifan	124	(6)
2019–2021	Chengdu Rongcheng	41	(0)

International career^{‡}
2011	China	3	(0)

Managerial career
- 2022–2024: Chengdu Rongcheng (assistant)
Medal record
Representing China
Men's football
AFC Youth Championship
Silver medal – second place	2004 َ Malaysia	Team
- * Club domestic league appearances and goals as of 31 December 2021 ‡ National team caps and goals as of 8 June 2011

Liu Yu (Chinese: 刘宇; pinyin: Liú Yǔ; born May 12, 1985, in Chengdu, Sichuan) is a Chinese retired football player who played as a defender.

== Club career ==
Liu Yu started his professional football career in 2004 with top-tier club Sichuan First City when he made his league debut against Beijing Guoan on March 16, 2004, in a 1–1 draw in Sichuan's first game of the season. He would quickly establish himself as Sichuan's first choice left-back and would feature in sixteen league games throughout the season. By the next season he would continue to be a prominent member of the team, however he found himself without a club at the beginning of the 2006 Chinese Super League when Sichuan Guancheng disbanded.

Without a club Liu Yu would move to reigning league champions Dalian Shide where he would make his league debut against Liaoning F.C. on March 18, 2006, in a 2–0 win. Once again he would quickly establish himself within the team and become their first choice left-back and make twenty league appearances in his debut season. By the next season Zhai Yanpeng regained his place as Dalian's left-back and Liu Yu was allowed to leave by the end of the season. This saw Liu Yu join fellow Chinese Super League team Henan Construction and while he was a regular throughout the season he only remained with them for one season before joining Chengdu Blades at the beginning of the 2009 Chinese Super League season.

At Chengdu, he immediately established himself as the club's first choice fullback and helped guide the team to mid-table safety in his first season; however, despite that, the club were relegated to the second tier when it was discovered that they fixed several games in 2007 to help them in their process for promotion to the top tier. Liu Yu decided to remain faithful towards the club and continued to be a vital member of the team, where he scored his first goal against Anhui Jiufang on September 11, 2010, in a league game that Chengdu won 4–0. By the end of the league campaign, Liu guided the club to second in the league and immediate promotion back into the Chinese Super League.

In June 2011, Liu Yu signed a two and half years contract with Chinese Super League team Jiangsu Sainty with a transfer fee of ¥500,000 (about $77,000 according to then exchange rate). In January 2012, Liu transferred to Super League newcomer Dalian Aerbin with a fee of ¥ 3 million. Liu transferred to another China League One club Chongqing Lifan in January 2014.

On 27 February 2019, Liu transferred to his hometown club Chengdu Better City in the China League Two. He would go on to win promotion with the club as they came runners-up at the end of the 2019 China League Two season. He would continue to help guide the team to another promotion at the end of the 2021 league campaign.

== International career ==
Liu Yu would be called up to the Chinese national team for the first time when the Chinese Head coach Gao Hongbo included him in a friendly On March 29, 2011, against Honduras and would aid China to a 3–0 victory.

== Career statistics ==
Statistics accurate as of match played 31 December 2021.

Appearances and goals by club, season and competition
Club	Season	League			National Cup		League Cup		Continental		Other		Total	
Club	Season	Division	Apps	Goals	Apps	Goals	Apps	Goals	Apps	Goals	Apps	Goals	Apps	Goals
Sichuan First City	2004	Chinese Super League	17	0	3	0	1	0	-		-		21	0
Sichuan First City	2005	Chinese Super League	17	0	1	0	0	0	-		-		18	0
Sichuan First City	Total		34	0	4	0	1	0	0	0	0	0	39	0
Dalian Shide	2006	Chinese Super League	20	0	3	0	-		4	0	-		27	0
Dalian Shide	2007	Chinese Super League	16	0	-		-		-		-		16	0
Dalian Shide	Total		36	0	3	0	0	0	4	0	0	0	43	0
Henan Construction	2008	Chinese Super League	19	0	-		-		-		-		19	0
Chengdu Blades	2009	Chinese Super League	26	0	-		-		-		-		26	0
Chengdu Blades	2010	China League One	23	1	-		-		-		-		23	1
Chengdu Blades	2011	Chinese Super League	11	0	1	0	-		-		-		12	0
Chengdu Blades	Total		60	1	1	0	0	0	0	0	0	0	61	1
Jiangsu Sainty	2011	Chinese Super League	9	0	0	0	-		-		-		9	0
Dalian Aerbin	2012	Chinese Super League	7	1	1	0	-		-		-		8	1
Dalian Aerbin	2013	Chinese Super League	16	0	2	0	-		-		-		18	0
Dalian Aerbin	Total		23	1	3	0	0	0	0	0	0	0	26	1
Chongqing Lifan	2014	China League One	26	0	1	0	-		-		-		27	0
Chongqing Lifan	2015	Chinese Super League	23	3	0	0	-		-		-		23	3
Chongqing Lifan	2016	Chinese Super League	27	3	0	0	-		-		-		27	3
Chongqing Lifan	2017	Chinese Super League	30	0	0	0	-		-		-		30	0
Chongqing Lifan	2018	Chinese Super League	18	0	0	0	-		-		-		18	0
Chongqing Lifan	Total		124	6	1	0	0	0	0	0	0	0	127	6
Chengdu Better City	2019	China League Two	28	0	1	0	-		-		-		29	0
Chengdu Better City	2020	China League One	7	0	0	0	-		-		-		7	0
Chengdu Better City	2021	China League One	6	0	1	0	-		-		0 (Note: Appearance(s) in CSL Relegation play-offs)	0	7	0
Chengdu Better City	Total		41	0	2	0	0	0	0	0	0	0	43	0
Career total			346	8	14	0	1	0	4	0	0	0	365	8

== Honours ==
=== Club ===
Chongqing Lifan

- China League One: 2014
