= Ma Shuai (footballer, born 1985) =

Chinese footballer

Ma Shuai 马帅
Personal information
- Date of birth: 16 February 1985 (age 41)
- Place of birth: Dalian, Liaoning, China
- Height: 1.89 m (6 ft 2 1/2 in)
- Position: Striker

Youth career
- 2001–2004: Dalian Shide

Senior career*
Years	Team	Apps	(Gls)
2004–2008	Dalian Shide	15	(5)
2004–2005	→ Citizen (loan)	21	(14)
2010–2011	Unsommet Iwate Hachimantai		
2011	Liaoning Whowin	0	(0)
- * Club domestic league appearances and goals as of April 1, 2011

Ma Shuai (Chinese: 马帅; born 16 February 1985 in Dalian) is a Chinese former footballer.

== Club career ==
Ma Shuai was loaned out to Citizen at the beginning of the 2004/05 Hong Kong First Division League season. He scored 14 league goals in 21 appearances for Citizen in this season, which made him to be a member of the Best Eleven Squad. After his successful loan at Hong Kong, Ma immediately returned to Dalian Shide in the summer of 2005. He made his debut against Beijing Guoan on 10 July 2005 in a 4-3 win and scored his first goal for Dalian. He scored 5 goals in 6 appearances in the 2005 Chinese Super League. On 20 November 2005, Ma scored the winning goal for Dalian against Shandong Luneng in the 2005 Chinese FA Cup final.

Ma got further opportunities in 2006, however he was often used as a substitute throughout the season. In 2007, he had a falling out with the team manager Jo Bonfrere and was sent to the reserve team immediately. He was released by Dalian in 2008.

Ma moved to Japan in 2010, playing with regional league football team Unsommet Iwate Hachimantai. He returned to China and signed a one-year deal with Liaoning Whowin in 2011. Failed to establish himself within the club, he was released at the end of the season.

== Honours ==
=== Club ===
Dalian Shide

- Chinese Super League: 2005
- Chinese FA Cup: 2005

=== Personal ===
- Hong Kong First Division League Best Eleven Squad: 2004-2005
