= Zhu Bo =

Chinese football manager (born 1960)

Zhu Bo 朱波
Personal information
- Date of birth: September 24, 1960 (age 66)
- Place of birth: Dalian, Liaoning, China
- Height: 1.74 m (5 ft 9 in)
- Position: Right-back

Youth career
- 1974–1978: Bayi

Senior career*
Years	Team	Apps	(Gls)
1978–1993	Bayi		
1994–1997	Shenzhen Feiyada		

International career
1983–1993	China	86	(1)

Managerial career
- 1999: Wuhan Hongtao (assistant)
- 2000–2002: Dalian Shide (assistant)
- 2004: Hunan Shoking
- 2005: Yunnan Lijiang Dongba
- 2006: Nanchang Hengyuan
- 2006–2008: Changsha Ginde F.C. (assistant)
- 2008–2009: Changsha Ginde F.C.
- 2010: Shenzhen Ruby F.C. (general manager)
- 2011: Shenzhen Phoenix (assistant)
- 2011–2012: Guangzhou R&F (assistant)
- 2013: Shenzhen Fengpeng
- 2015: Yinchuan Helanshan
Medal record
Representing China
Men's football
AFC Asian Cup
Silver medal – second place	1984 Singapore	Team
Bronze medal – third place	1992 Japan	Team
- * Club domestic league appearances and goals

Zhu Bo (Chinese: 朱波; pinyin: Zhū Bō; Mandarin pronunciation: [ʈʂú pwó]; born on September 24, 1960) is a Chinese football manager and a former international football player. As a player, he was a right-back who represented Bayi Football Team where he won several league titles while captaining his team before ending his career with Shenzhen Feiyada. As a manager, he has coached several clubs within the Chinese football league divisions, which include Hunan Shoking, Yunnan Lijiang Dongba, Nanchang Hengyuan, Changsha Ginde F.C., Shenzhen Fengpeng and Yinchuan Helanshan.

== Playing career ==
Zhu Bo was born in Dalian, Liaoning. He began his football career playing Bayi Football Team after he was drafted in from the club's youth team. Showing great reliability and consistency within the team's defence he would go on to have a fruitful career with the team and go on to win the league title in the 1981 league season. He would soon receive a call up to the Chinese national team and make his debut in a friendly against Australia on December 4, 1983, in a 2–1 victory. His performance would see him become a regular within the national team and see him included in the 1984 AFC Asian Cup squad where he was a vital member of the team that came runners-up in the tournament. After that campaign Zhu would later become the team's captain and lead them to several further tournaments, however none were as successful. Back at his club he would continue with his reliability and captain his team to another league title during the 1986 league season. After spending his whole career with the same team and nearing the end of career Zhu would decide to leave the club at the beginning of the 1994 league season for a new challenge in joining recently created football club Shenzhen Feiyada and aid them in establishing themselves within the football league pyramid.

== Managerial career ==
After he retired Zhu Bo would take up coaching and go to Italy to gain his coaching badges where after a year once he achieved this he would become an assistant at Wuhan Hongtao, however he unexpectedly became the temporary manager of Wuhan for a short period during the 1999 league season while the club found a permanent coach. Only staying for one season he would instead join the exiting Wuhan coach Milorad Kosanović and join him as an assistant within Dalian Shide. After spending a few years at Dalian Zhu would take his first manager appointment at second tier club Hunan Shoking where he achieved little success before joining another lower league side Yunnan Lijiang Dongba and then Nanchang Hengyuan before becoming an assistant again with top tier side Changsha Ginde F.C. where he was once again given the opportunity to become the team's manager when the previous coach Slobodan Santrač left. This time Zhu's reign lasted considerably longer and he guided the club to an eleventh-place finish.

== Honours ==
=== Player ===
Bayi Football Team

- Chinese Jia-A League: 1981, 1986

Shenzhen Feiyada

- Chinese Jia-C League: 1994
- Chinese Jia-B League: 1995
