= Quan Lei =

Chinese footballer

Quan Lei 权磊
Personal information
- Full name: Quan Lei
- Date of birth: 13 January 1985 (age 41)
- Place of birth: Dalian, Liaoning, China
- Height: 1.80 m (5 ft 11 in)
- Position: Midfielder

Youth career
- 2001–2003: Dalian Shide

Senior career*
Years	Team	Apps	(Gls)
2004–2012	Dalian Shide	120	(6)
2013–2015	Qingdao Jonoon	71	(2)
2016–2017	Nei Mongol Zhongyou	46	(1)
2018	Shenyang Urban	17	(1)
Medal record
Men's football
Representing China
East Asian Games
Gold medal – first place	2001 Macau	Football
- * Club domestic league appearances and goals as of 13 October 2018

Quan Lei (simplified Chinese: 权磊; traditional Chinese: 權磊; pinyin: Quán Lěi; born 13 January 1985 in Dalian, Liaoning) is a Chinese former football midfielder.

== Biography ==
Quan Lei would start his footballer career playing for Dalian Shide's youth team as well as also playing for the Chinese U19 in 2003 before graduating to Dalian's senior team in the 2004 league season where he made his league debut on November 11, 2004, against Shanghai Shenhua in a 1–0 win. When Vladimir Petrović became the new Dalian manager he quickly praised Quan and included him as a first team regular within the side that won the league and cup double.

On October 5, 2006, Quan was badly wounded in a knife attack by two assailants and was stabbed eight times in the attack. It was discovered that the two assailants were hired by a disgruntled female fan who had a brief relationship with the player, while all three members involved with the attack were sentenced to three years of imprisonment. Despite the severe injuries he received as well as the court case that followed he resumed training in January 2008. Quan would eventually make his long-awaited return on May 3, 2008, against Wuhan Optics Valley F.C. in a league game that ended in a 1–1 draw, however this was later changed to a 3–0 win to Dalian after Wuhan decided to quit the league.

On 28 January 2016, Quan transferred to China League One club Nei Mongol Zhongyou.

== Honours ==
Dalian Shide

- Chinese Super League: 2005
- Chinese FA Cup: 2005
