= Srđan Bajčetić =

Serbian footballer

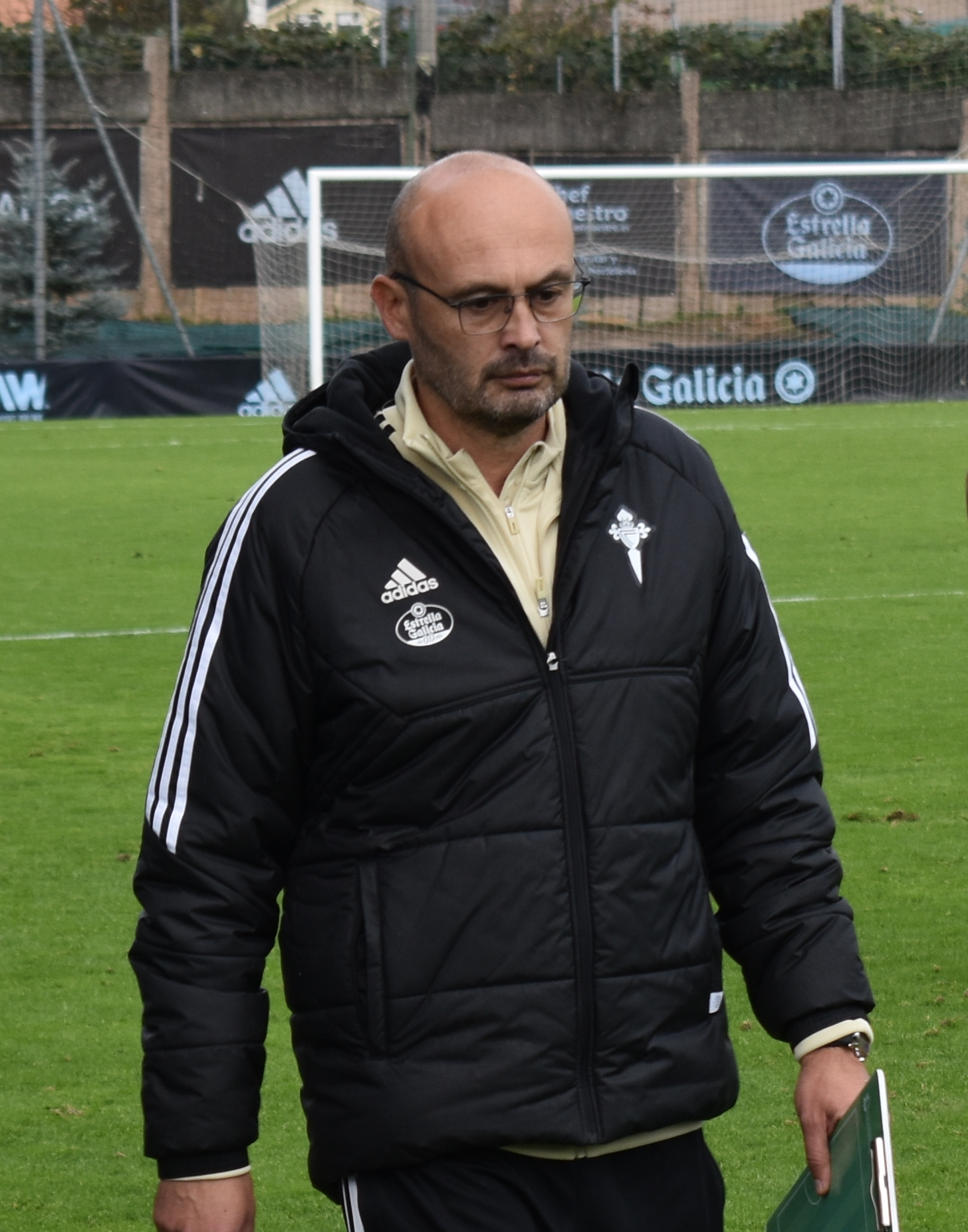

Personal information
- Date of birth: 7 November 1971 (age 54)
- Place of birth: Zrenjanin, SR Serbia, Yugoslavia
- Height: 1.88 m (6 ft 2 in)
- Position: Midfielder

Senior career*
Years	Team	Apps	(Gls)
1992–1994	Vojvodina	59	(18)
1994–1997	Celta de Vigo	29	(3)
1995	→ Red Star Belgrade (loan)	14	(1)
1997–1998	Braga	17	(5)
1998–2001	Red Star Belgrade	50	(4)
2001–2003	Dalian Shide	60	(2)
2004	Hunan Shoking	25	(3)
Total		254	(36)
- * Club domestic league appearances and goals

Srđan Bajčetić (Serbian Cyrillic: Срђан Бајчетић; born 7 November 1971) is a Serbian former professional footballer who played as a midfielder and the current manager of Celta C - Gran Peña. During his career he played with FK Vojvodina, Celta de Vigo, Red Star Belgrade, S.C. Braga, Dalian Shide and Hunan Shoking.

== Managerial career ==
Bajčetić had spells as assistant manager at Al-Fayha FC and Club Rápido de Bouzas.

In addition to this, Bajčetić also held the manager position on the following reserve teams: ED Val Minor Nigrán, Celta Vigo Youth and RC Celta de Vigo C.

== Personal life ==
His son, Stefan, plays for Celta de Vigo's reserve team in Segunda División, having signed for the club in August 2026.

== Honours ==
Dalian Shide

- Chinese Jia-A League: 2001, 2002
- Chinese FA Cup: 2001
