= Chen Dong (footballer) =

Chinese football player

Chen Dong 陈东
Personal information
- Date of birth: 3 May 1978 (age 48)
- Place of birth: Jilin, China
- Height: 1.91 m (6 ft 3 in)
- Position: Goalkeeper

Team information
- Current team: Dalian Yingbo (team manager)

Senior career*
Years	Team	Apps	(Gls)
1997–2009	Dalian Shide	113	(0)
2003	→ Sichuan Guancheng(loan)	14	(0)
2004	→ Dalian Changbo(loan)	30	(0)

International career^{‡}
2003–2008	China	3	(0)

Managerial career
- 2014-2018: Dalian Transcendence (goalkeeping)
- ?-2022: Dalian Pro Youth (goalkeeping)
- 2022-: Dalian Yingbo (team manager)
Medal record
Representing China
Men's football
EAFF Championship
Bronze medal – third place	2008 China	Team
Asian Games
Bronze medal – third place	1998 Bangkok	Football
AFC Youth Championship
Silver medal – second place	1996 َ South Korea	Team
- * Club domestic league appearances and goals as of 14 April 2009 ‡ National team caps and goals as of 14 April 2009

Chen Dong (Chinese: 陈东; born 3 May 1978, in Jilin) is a former Chinese football player and current goalkeeping coach.

== Club career ==
Chen Dong started his professional career in 1998 playing for the Dalian Wanda where for several seasons with the club he played understudy to Han Wenhai until Han left before the beginning of the 2001 league season. Finally established as the team's first choice goalkeeper he would continue Dalian's dominance within China and win the 2001 league title. His reign was short lived and the emergence of An Qi saw Chen drop back down as to second choice the following season, unable to re-establish himself as the regular first choice goalkeeper. Despite winning several further league titles Chen received very little playing time and in the 2003 league season he would go on loan to Sichuan Guancheng and then Dalian Changbo in the 2004 season where he would gain much more playing time and establish himself as the first choice goalkeeper at both of these clubs. In the 2005 season he would return to Dalian, which had changed its name to Dalian Shide to become their first choice goalkeeper once more and go on to win another league title with them. He remained a consistent performer for Dalian until the 2008 league season when he was criticised for his poor performances with several other players and was dropped for Sun Shoubo, the club kept on to him until the end of the 2009 league season when his contract expired and he was released.

== Managerial career ==
Between 2009 and 2014, he worked at Dalian Aerbin as gerenal manager assistant.

In 2014, he joined Dalian Transcendence. In the 2018 season, he was the goalkeeping coach of the team. Following Transcendence's disband, he moved back to the renamed Dalian Yifang as goalkeeping coach of the youth team in 2019.

In 2022, he was appointed by Dalian Duxing as the general manager.

== International career ==
Chen Dong would make his senior international debut in a friendly on February 16, 2003, against Estonia in a 1–0 victory. In total he made three appearances for China, the last was against Thailand in a friendly on the 15 March 2008 coming on as a substitute for Zong Lei, which ended 3-3.

== Honours ==
Dalian Wanda

- Chinese Jia-A League/Chinese Super League: 1998, 2000, 2001, 2002, 2005
- Chinese FA Cup: 2001, 2005
