= Alex Agbo =

Nigerian professional footballer

Personal information
- Date of birth: 1 July 1977 (age 49)
- Place of birth: Jos, Nigeria
- Height: 1.89 m (6 ft 2 in)
- Position: Striker

Team information
- Current team: Sharks FC

Senior career*
Years	Team	Apps	(Gls)
1996	Samsunspor	13	(1)
1997	Cheonan Ilhwa Chunma	23	(2)
1998–2002	Xiamen Hongshi		
2000	→Jiangsu Sainty (loan)		
2003	Jiangsu Sainty	25	(13)
2004	Xiamen Hongshi	10	(0)
2005–2006	Hunan Shoking	32	(9)
2007–2008	PLUS FC		
2008–	Sharks F.C.		
- * Club domestic league appearances and goals as of June 1, 2008

Alex Agbo (born 1 July 1977) is a Nigerian professional footballer. He currently plays for Sharks FC in the Nigerian Premier League after playing for years in Malaysia.
