= Feng Zhigang =

Chinese footballer

Feng Zhigang 冯志刚
Personal information
- Full name: Feng Zhigang
- Date of birth: February 27, 1969
- Place of birth: Wuhan, Hubei, China
- Date of death: July 7, 2011 (aged 42)
- Place of death: Wuhan, Hubei, China
- Height: 1.76 m (5 ft 9 1/2 in)
- Position: Defender

Senior career*
Years	Team	Apps	(Gls)
1992–1995	Wuhan Steelworks		
1996–1998	Qianwei Huandao		
1999–2000	Wuhan Hongtao K		

International career
1992–1993	China	10	(0)

Managerial career
- 2001–2008: Wuhan Hongtao K (assistant)
- 2008–2011: Shaanxi Baorong Chanba(assistant)
Medal record
Men's football
Representing China
AFC Asian Cup
Bronze medal – third place	1992 Japan	Team
- * Club domestic league appearances and goals

Feng Zhigang (Chinese: 冯志刚; 27 February 1969 – 7 July 2011) was a Chinese football forward who played for China PR in the 1992 Asian Cup. In the aspect of club football, he played for Wuhan Hongtao K and Qianwei Huandao.

== Playing career ==
Feng Zhigang was born in Wuhan on 27 February 1969. His playing position is defender. From 1992 to 1995, Feng Zhigang played for Wuhan Steelworks football club. From 1996 to 1998, Feng Zhigang joined Qianwei Huandao. From 2001 to 2008, Feng Zhigang returned and played for Wuhan Hongtao K until he retired. Feng Zhigang entered the China national football team in 1992 and has played for China PR in the 1992 Asian Cup.

== Management career ==
Feng Zhigang retired in 2001, then he worked as assistant coach of Wuhan Hongtao K. In 2008, Wuhan Hongtao K quit the Chinese Super League. Feng Zhigang went to work as assistant coach of Shaanxi Baorong Chanba.

== Death ==
On November 27, 2009, Feng Zhigang suffered a sudden cerebral hemorrhage in Wuhan metro supermarket when he was shopping. Family members sent him to the Wuhan University zhongnan hospital for emergency treatment. After two operations, Feng Zhigang remained in a coma. On July 7, 2011, Feng Zhigang died in hospital, at the age of 42.

== Honours ==
Qianwei Huandao

- Jia B League: 1996
