= Choi In-young =

South Korean footballer

Choi In-young 최인영
Personal information
- Full name: Choi In-young
- Date of birth: 5 March 1962 (age 64)
- Place of birth: South Korea
- Height: 1.81 m (5 ft 11 1/2 in)
- Position: Goalkeeper

Youth career
- University of Seoul

Senior career*
Years	Team	Apps	(Gls)
1981–1983	Seoul City Amateur		
1983	Kookmin Bank FC	2	(0)
1984–1996	Ulsan Hyundai	163	(0)

International career^{‡}
1981	South Korea U20		
1983–1994	South Korea	51	(0)

Managerial career
- 1997–2003: Ulsan Hyundai (coach)
- 2005: Kyungil University (coach)
- 2006–2013: Jeonbuk Hyundai Motors (coach)
Medal record
Representing South Korea
Men's football
Asian Games
Bronze medal – third place	1990 Beijing	Team
Dynasty Cup
Gold medal – first place	1990 China	Team
Silver medal – second place	1992 China
- * Club domestic league appearances and goals as of 10 June 2007 ‡ National team caps and goals as of 10 June 2007

- Choi In-young
- Hangul: 최인영
- Hanja: 崔仁榮
- RR: Choe Inyeong
- MR: Ch'oe Inyŏng

Choi In-young (born 5 March 1962) is a former South Korean football player who played as a goalkeeper.

He played mostly for Ulsan Hyundai Horang-i. He participated for South Korea national football team at two editions of FIFA World Cup in 1990 and 1994, retiring from international football following the final group stage match in the latter tournament, against Germany, played in Dallas under a stifling 46°C heat, which led him to request his substitution by future national starter Lee Woon-jae at half-time.

== Playing career ==
He played in South Korea for Seoul City (1981–1983) on an amateur basis, Kookmin Bank FC (1983) and Ulsan Hyundai Horang-i (1984–1996).

== Coaching career ==
He was goalkeeper coach at Ulsan Hyundai Horang-i (1997–2003), Kyungil University (2005) and Jeonbuk Hyundai Motors (2006–2013).

== Career statistics ==
=== International clean sheets ===
Results list South Korea's goal tally first.

#	Date	Venue	Opponent	Result	Competition
1	6 June 1983	Suwon, South Korea	Thailand	4–0	1983 President's Cup
2	8 June 1983	Seoul, South Korea	Nigeria	1–0	1983 President's Cup
3	12 June 1983	Jeonju, South Korea	Indonesia	3–0	1983 President's Cup
4	15 June 1983	Seoul, South Korea	Ghana	1–0	1983 President's Cup
5	2 March 1985	Kathmandu, Nepal	Nepal	2–0	1986 FIFA World Cup qualification
6	19 May 1985	Seoul, South Korea	Malaysia	2–0	1986 FIFA World Cup qualification
7	28 July 1990	Beijing, China	Japan	2–0	1990 Dynasty Cup
8	29 July 1990	Beijing, China	North Korea	1–0	1990 Dynasty Cup
9	5 September 1990	Seoul, South Korea	Australia	1–0	Friendly match
10	23 September 1990	Beijing, China	Singapore	7–0	1990 Asian Games
11	27 September 1990	Beijing, China	China	2–0	1990 Asian Games
12	1 October 1990	Beijing, China	Kuwait	1–0	1990 Asian Games
13	5 October 1990	Beijing, China	Thailand	1–0	1990 Asian Games
14	7 June 1991	Seoul, South Korea	Egypt	0–0	1991 President's Cup
15	14 June 1991	Seoul, South Korea	Australia	0–0 (4–3 PSO)	1991 President's Cup
16	16 June 1991	Seoul, South Korea	Egypt	2–0	1991 President's Cup
17	22 August 1992	Beijing, China	Japan	0–0	1992 Dynasty Cup
18	26 August 1992	Beijing, China	China	2–0	1992 Dynasty Cup
19	27 September 1993	Seoul, South Korea	Australia	1–0	Friendly match
20	16 October 1993	Doha, Qatar	Iran	3–0	1994 FIFA World Cup qualification
21	28 October 1993	Doha, Qatar	North Korea	3–0	1994 FIFA World Cup qualification
22	23 June 1994	Boston, United States	Bolivia	0–0	1994 FIFA World Cup

== Honours ==
=== Club ===
Ulsan Hyundai

- K League 1: 1996
- Korean League Cup: 1986, 1995

=== International ===
South Korea

- Dynasty Cup: 1990
