= Fu Bin =

Chinese footballer and coach

Fu Bin 符宾
Personal information
- Date of birth: May 6, 1969 (age 57)
- Place of birth: Beijing, China
- Height: 1.94 m (6 ft 4 in)
- Position: Goalkeeper

Team information
- Current team: Tianjin Teda

Youth career
- Hebei team

Senior career*
Years	Team	Apps	(Gls)
1986–1993	Hebei team		
1994	Jilin Samsung	8	(0)
1995–1997	Beijing Guoan	59	(0)
1998–2003	Chongqing Lifan	146	(0)
2004–2006	Hunan Shoking	76	(0)
2007–2009	Chengdu Blades	61	(0)

International career^{‡}
2000–2001	China	7	(0)

Managerial career
- 2004–2006: Hunan Shoking (goalkeeping)
- 2005: Hunan Shoking (caretaker)
- 2010–2011: Chengdu Blades (goalkeeping)
- 2011–2012: Tianjin Teda (goalkeeping)
- * Club domestic league appearances and goals as of 12:00, 1 Jan 2012 (UTC) ‡ National team caps and goals as of 16:11, 1 Jan 2012 (UTC)

Fu Bin (Chinese: 符宾; Chinese: 符賓; pinyin: Fú Bīn; born May 6, 1969, in Beijing) is a Chinese football goalkeeping coach and a former international football player.

His playing career would see him win three Chinese FA Cup titles with Beijing Guoan and Chongqing Lifan. He also represented Hebei team, Jilin Samsung, Hunan Shoking while at Chengdu Blades he achieved the distinction for being the oldest professional player in Chinese history aged 40 years and 133 days before he retired.

== Club career ==
Born in Beijing, Fu Bin moved to Hebei to start his sporting career where he originally excelled in basketball before turning his attentions to football where he was good enough to gain a spot within the Hebei team as one of their goalkeepers in 1986. He would stay with Hebei for several seasons until the 1994 league season when the league became fully professional and he was offered a transfer to Jilin Samsung. The move turned out to be a disappointment and he spent most of the season sitting on the bench. However the following season he was offered a move back to his hometown with Beijing Guoan in a move that proved to be a huge success and ushered in the peak of his career when he helped the team to win the 1996 and 1997 Chinese FA Cup as well as also achieving his first call up to the China national football team.

In the 1998 league season an offer of 2 million yuan was offered for him by Qianwei Huandao (now known as Chongqing Lifan) and despite achieving significant success with Beijing as well as regular playing time with the club he decided to leave and take the offer from Qianwei Huandao. The move initially came under much scrutiny because he had left a club who were genuine title contenders for one who were recently promoted, with many Beijing fans believing he moved purely for the money. While his first few seasons with the club were uninspired Fu Bin was able to prove his critics wrong when he would win the 2000 Chinese FA Cup with them as well as eventually spending five full seasons with the club before he left them in 2003 to go to second tier club Hunan Shoking where he was also offered a goalkeeper coaching role as well. By the 2006 league season Hunan Shoking were relegated and Fu Bin was allowed to leave for another second tier club Chengdu Blades where he immediately won promotion with them in his first season with the club and another chance to play in the top tier once again. He would aid the club for two seasons within the top flight and go on to achieve the record for being the oldest professional Chinese player in the last game of the season on October 31, 2009, in a league game against Shandong Luneng in a 1–0 victory aged 40 years and 133 days before he retired.

== Honours ==
Beijing Guoan F.C.

- Chinese FA Cup: 1996, 1997

Chongqing Lifan

- Chinese FA Cup: 2000
