= Dong Liqiang =

Chinese footballer and coach

Personal information
- Date of birth: 20 August 1965 (age 61)
- Place of birth: Liaoning, China
- Positions: Defender; midfielder

Senior career*
Years	Team	Apps	(Gls)
1986–1996	Liaoning FC		
1997–1999	Shenzhen Ping'an		

International career
1988–1993	China	21	(0)

Managerial career
- 2000: Shenyang Sealion (assistant)
- 2003: Liaoning Zhongshun (assistant)
- 2004: Shenzhen Jianlibao (assistant)
- 2005-2006: Liaoning FC (assistant)
- 2007: Liaoning FC Reserve
- 2008: Henan Jianye (assistant)
- 2011: Henan Jianye (assistant)
- 2012-2014: Chongqing Lifan (assistant)
- 2015-2016: Shenzhen FC (assistant)
- 2018: Yinchuan Helanshan (assistant)
- 2019-2024: Liaoning Tieren (assistant)
Medal record
Men's football
Representing China
AFC Asian Cup
Bronze medal – third place	1992 Japan	Team
- * Club domestic league appearances and goals

Dong Liqiang (Chinese: 董礼强; born 20 August 1965 in Liaoning) is a Chinese assistant football coach and a former international player.

As a player he won six league titles and the 1989-90 Asian Club Championship with Liaoning FC before ending his career with Shenzhen Ping'an. While internationally he represented China in the 1988 Asian Cup and 1992 Asian Cup. Since retiring he moved to assistant management and had coached Shenyang, Nanjing Yoyo F.C., Shenzhen Ping'an Kejian, Liaoning FC and Henan Jianye.

== Playing career ==
Dong Liqiang would join the senior team of Liaoning FC in the 1986 season and would be part of the squad that won the Chinese FA Cup that campaign. The following season, he would start to establish himself as a physically strong and fierce defender within the team and went on to win 1987 league title with Liaoning. After an impressive start to his career the Head coach of the Chinese team Gao Fengwen called him into the squad for the 1988 AFC Asian Cup and played him in the semi-final game against South Korea, which China lost 2–1 after extra time. He returned to club football and helped establish Liaoning as the dominant team within Chinese football by winning several further league titles with the club and the 1989-90 Asian Club Championship making them the first Chinese team to win the premier Asian continental championship. Despite his club success his international career would ultimately be mired by his performance within the 1990 FIFA World Cup qualification (AFC) campaign when on the 17 October 1989 match against United Arab Emirates he was responsible for their two late goals, which saw China lose the match 2-1 and ultimately a place within the World Cup. He was eventually able to rectify his mistakes when in the 1992 AFC Asian Cup China faced United Arab Emirates once again and he played in the team that beat them 4–3 in extra time to win the third place match within the tournament. After spending his whole career with Liaoning and nearing the end of his career he would decide to leave his hometown club and joined second-tier football club Shenzhen Ping'an in the 1997 league season where he helped guide them to a runners-up spot within their division a promotion to the top tier. He would spend two more seasons with the club as they remained within the division before he retired at the end of the 1999 campaign.

== Career statistics ==
=== International statistics ===
Year	Competition	Apps	Goal
1988–1992	Asian Cup	7	0
1989–1993	FIFA World Cup qualification	8	0
1988	AFC Asian Cup qualifiers	3	0
1992–1993	Friendly	3	0
1990	Dynasty Cup	3	0
Total		21	0

== Honours ==
Liaoning FC

- Chinese Jia-A League: 1987, 1988, 1990, 1991, 1992, 1993
- Chinese FA Cup: 1986
- Asian Club Championship: 1989-90
