= Bian Jun =

Chinese footballer

Bian Jun 卞军
Personal information
- Date of birth: July 15, 1977 (age 49)
- Place of birth: Shanghai, China
- Height: 1.85 m (6 ft 1 in)
- Positions: Centre-back; striker

Senior career*
Years	Team	Apps	(Gls)
1995–1996	Shanghai Pudong	?	(?)
1997–2005	Shanghai Shenhua	159	(6)
2006	Shanghai United	12	(0)

International career^{‡}
1998	China U23		
1998	China	1	(0)
Medal record
Men's football
Representing China
Asian Games
Bronze medal – third place	1998 Bangkok	Football
- * Club domestic league appearances and goals as of 15 March 2010 ‡ National team caps and goals as of 15 March 2010

Bian Jun (simplified Chinese: 卞军; traditional Chinese: 卞軍; pinyin: Biàn Jūn; born 15 July 1977) is a former Chinese international football player who is mostly associated with his time at Shanghai Shenhua where he won the 1998 Chinese FA Cup. He started his career with Shanghai Pudong, where he played as a striker, then joined Shenhua, where he was converted to a central defender. After spending the majority of his career there, he moved to Shanghai United before he retired.

== Club career ==
Bian won several caps for China National Team and China U-23 National Team and played for China in the 1998 Bangkok Asian Game. He started his career as a football player in Shanghai Pudong, then sparked interest from Shanghai Shenhua and finally made the switch in 1997. He made 159 appearances for Shanghai Shenhua and scored six times in a period that saw him win the 1998 Chinese FA Cup and 2003 league title. However, in 2013 the Chinese Football Association revoked the league title after it was discovered that the Shenhua General manager Lou Shifang had bribed officials to be biased for Shenhua in games that season.

In the 2006 league campaign he was loaned out to Shanghai United, where he played just 12 games before he declared his retirement from the game.

== Honours ==
Shanghai Shenhua

- Chinese FA Cup: 1998
