= Zhang Weihua =

Chinese revolutionary (1913–1937)

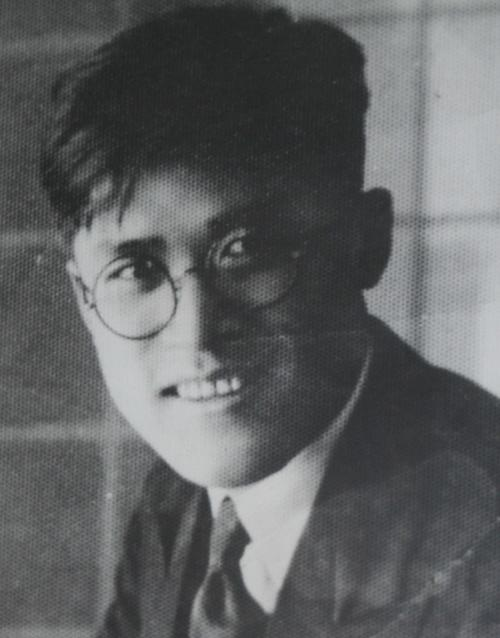
- Zhang Weihua in 1937
- Born: Zhang Yaqing (張亞青); January 1913; Heshuihezi, Tonghua County, Jilin Province, Republic of China
- Died: 27 October 1937 (aged 24); Jilin Province, Republic of China
- Cause of death: Suicide by mercury poisoning under duress from Japanese forces
- Resting place: Chengxi Jiang Park, Fusong County, Baishan, Jilin Province, China
- Monuments: Zhang Weihua Martyrs' Cemetery
- Occupation: Revolutionary activist
- Known for: Anti-Japanese resistance activities and friendship with Kim Il Sung
- Political party: Chinese Communist Party
- Movement: Anti-Japanese resistance movement
- Spouse: Wang Yaqing
- Children: Zhang Lang (eldest son); Zhang Jinquan (second son); Zhang Jinlu (daughter)
- Parent: Zhang Wancheng (father)

Zhang Weihua (Chinese: 张蔚华; January 1913 – October 27, 1937), also known as Zhang Yaqing, was a Chinese revolutionary and Communist activist. He was a close childhood friend and revolutionary comrade of Kim Il Sung and served as the head of an underground organization of the Chinese Communist Party in Northeast China.

He is remembered for his support of anti-Japanese guerrilla forces in the 1930s and for committing suicide to avoid revealing information under Japanese interrogation.

== Biography ==
Zhang Weihua was born on January, 1913, in Heshuihezi, Tonghua County (Fusong area), Jilin Province, to a wealthy merchant family. His father, Zhang Wancheng (also known as Zhang Manzheng, born 1889), was a businessman and photographer who had migrated from Shandong Province and operated a photo studio in Fusong. Zhang's father was a close acquaintance of Kim Il Sung's father, Kim Hyong-jik, whom he financially supported and once hid from authorities.

As a result, Zhang Weihua and Kim Il Sung (then known as Kim Song-ju) became childhood friends and attended Fusong County First Primary School together. Zhang later studied at Shenyang Municipal Middle School and, according to some accounts, also at Yuwen Middle School in Jilin Province. One story claims Zhang's grandfather opposed his close association with Kim and prevented him from attending the same middle school for a period. Despite this, the two remained lifelong friends.

In 1926, Zhang assisted Kim Il Sung in producing articles, stencils, and mimeographs to help launch the Korean revolutionary publication Red Sun. The two later co-founded the Baishan Youth Alliance.

In winter 1928, when Kim Il Sung was arrested by the warlord Zhang Xueliang for anti-Japanese activities, Zhang's father helped secure his release.

From 1929 onward, Zhang participated in Communist activities. In 1930 he purchased and delivered 14 single-shot rifles, followed by 40 rifles in 1931.

Zhang provided continuous and extensive logistical support to Kim Il Sung's Korean People’s Revolutionary Army / guerrilla forces, including large quantities of cotton, fabric, shoes, socks, underwear, food, medicine, and even photographic materials. Supplies were often smuggled through the photo studio. One notable incident involved Kim Il Sung sending his bodyguard Kim San-ho with 20 yuan (a significant sum at the time) and a hidden letter during a harsh winter when the guerrillas lacked clothing. Zhang responded by preparing large amounts of fabric (dyed using boiled oak and chestnut bark for color), which was loaded onto carts. Although some was seized by bandits, Kim's unit recovered it, and the cloth was used to make clothes for the fighters and children. Zhang also sent substantial additional aid, including, according to some North Korean accounts, very large sums of money (claimed in some sources as up to 3 million yuan) to support food and clothing needs.

In 1932, at Kim Il Sung's recommendation, Zhang joined the Chinese Communist Party and was appointed head of an underground organization attached to the Northeast Anti-Japanese United Army (2nd Route Army). He used the family's Brothers Photo Studio and Brothers Bookstore as covers for revolutionary work. The studio's darkroom served as a secure meeting place where conversations could not be overheard.

In October 1937, a Korean collaborator named Ri Jong-rak (who had previously been an early revolutionary comrade of Kim Il-sung but later worked for the Japanese authorities) approached Zhang and extracted information about Kim Il Sung. Zhang was arrested and imprisoned. After being released on bail by his father, he wrote a farewell message to underground comrades warning that "Japanese forces are searching for Kim Il Sung's headquarters. Relocate it immediately." On October 27, 1937, surrounded by Japanese forces, he committed suicide by ingesting mercuric chloride (calomel/sublimate).

== Legacy and honors ==
Zhang Weihua’s body was buried near his home. A martyrs’ cemetery and memorial hall (Zhang Weihua Martyrs' Cemetery and Memorial Hall) were later established in Fusong County, Jilin Province. His family home was preserved and turned into a memorial site.

Kim Il Sung personally looked after Zhang’s surviving family as if they were his own. In North Korea, Zhang is honored as a revolutionary martyr and symbol of China–Korea friendship and anti-Japanese resistance. In 1953, Mao Zedong issued a "Revolutionary Martyr’s Family Honorary Certificate" to his family.

The Zhang Weihua Martyrs' Cemetery contains an inscription by Kim Il Sung:

The revolutionary achievements of Comrade Zhang Weihua are a glorious example of the friendship between the peoples of Korea and China. The lofty revolutionary spirit and revolutionary achievements of the martyr will live forever in the hearts of the people.
— Kim Il Sung, October 27, 1992
