= Taoray Wang =

Chinese fashion designer

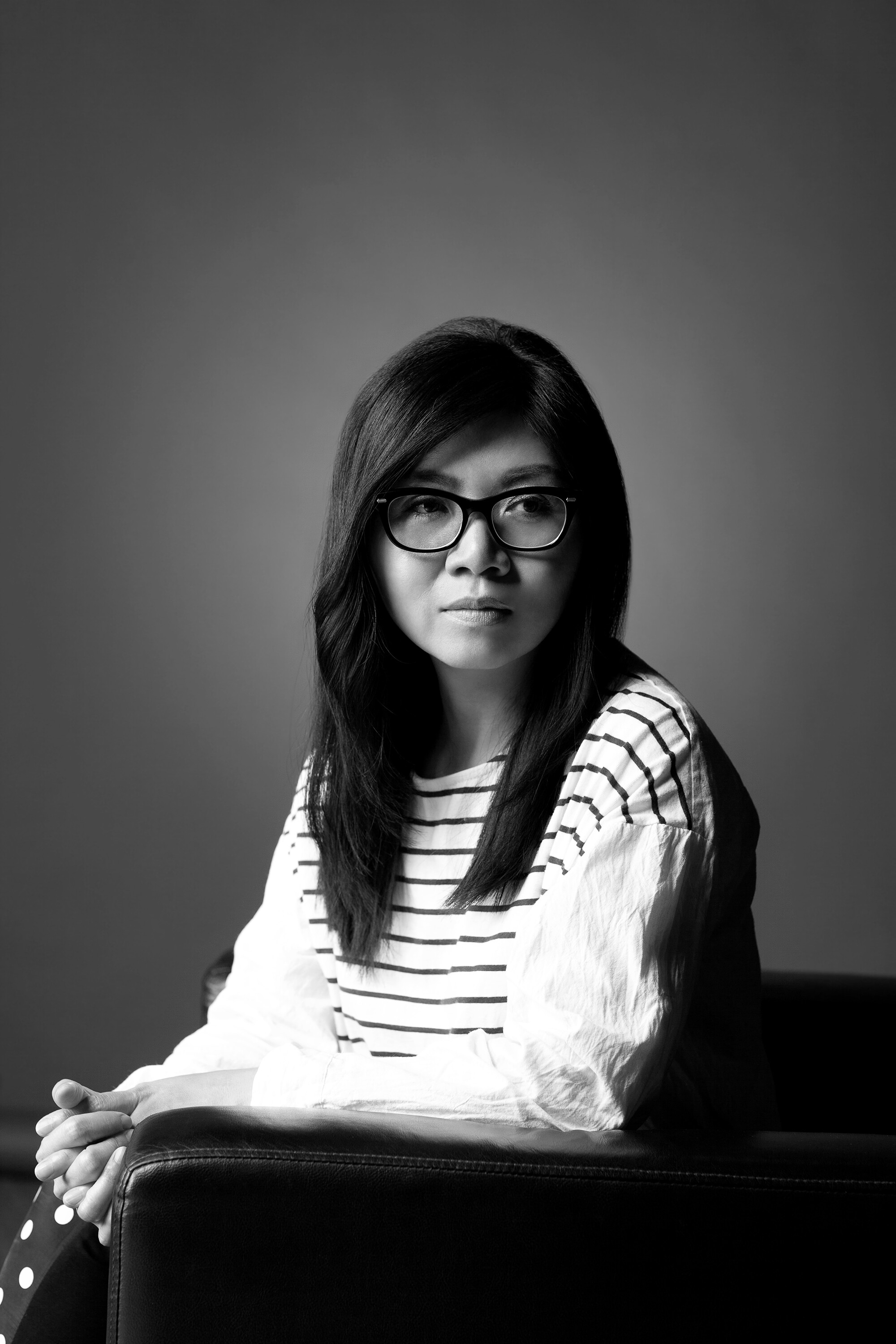
Taoray Wang

Wang Tao (Chinese: 王陶; pinyin: Wáng Táo; born June 11, 1967), professionally known as Taoray Wang, is a Chinese fashion designer who founded her namesake brand, Taoray Wang.

After graduating from East China Normal University, Wang trained at Tokyo Mode Gakuen in Japan, where she was awarded five international fashion awards. From there, Wang headed the studio for Junko Koshino, the highly acclaimed Japanese designer. Wang was recruited as Chief Designer for a women's wear brand in London. Recognized for her skills, Wang became Creative Director and CEO for broadcast:bo, a Chinese women's label.

In the 2010s, Wang became one of Asia's most famous fashion designers. Her collection debuted at the New York Fashion Week in September 2014 to accolades from both retailers and media. On September 8, 2014, Taoray Wang's first Spring/Summer Collection debuted on Mercedes-Benz Fashion Week. On February 16, 2015, her Autumn/Fall Collection also released on Mercedes-Benz Fashion Week. Wang was a favorite designer of Tiffany Trump.
