= Yang Guang (footballer) =

Chinese association football player

Personal information
- Date of birth: 11 February 1980 (age 46)
- Place of birth: Kunming, Yunnan, China
- Height: 1.76 m (5 ft 9 in)
- Position: Defender

Youth career
- 1991–1998: Locomotive

Senior career*
Years	Team	Apps	(Gls)
1999	Qingdao Hailifeng		
2000–2002	Shenzhen Ping An Insurance	65	(2)
2003–2005	Shanghai Shenhua	27	(0)
2014–2015	Jiangsu Yancheng Dingli	19	(2)
Total		111	(4)
- * Club domestic league appearances and goals

Yang Guang (Chinese: 杨光; born 11 February 1980) is a former Chinese footballer who played as a defender for Shanghai Shenhua.
