= Amer Al-Kaabi =

Qatari footballer (born 1971)

Amer Al Kaabi
Personal information
- Date of birth: 20 May 1971 (age 55)
- Place of birth: Qatar
- Position: Goalkeeper

Senior career*
Years	Team	Apps	(Gls)
1991–1992	Al Ahli	-	(-)
1999–2007	Al Gharrafa	-	(-)

International career
1992–2004	Qatar	33	(0)
- * Club domestic league appearances and goals

Amer Al Kaabi is a Qatar football goalkeeper who played for Qatar in the 2000 Asian Cup. He also played for Al Ahli and Al Ittihad (later renamed Al Gharrafa).
