= Han Wenhai =

Chinese footballer and coach

Han Wenhai 韩文海
Personal information
- Full name: Han Wenhai
- Date of birth: 28 January 1971 (age 55)
- Place of birth: Dalian, China
- Height: 1.86 m (6 ft 1 in)
- Position: Goalkeeper

Senior career*
Years	Team	Apps	(Gls)
1994–2000	Dalian Shide	159	(0)
2001	Zhejiang Greentown	18	(0)
2002–2004	Shenyang Ginde	53	(0)
Total		230	(0)

Managerial career
- 2003-2004: Shenyang Ginde (assistant)
- -2016: Dalian Yifang (goalkeeping)
- 2016: Dalian Yifang (team manager)
- 2018: Dalian Yifang (goalkeeping)
Medal record
Representing China
Men's football
East Asian Football Championship
Bronze medal – third place	2003 Japan	Team
- * Club domestic league appearances and goals as of 12:28, 1 April 2009 (UTC) ‡ National team caps and goals as of 12:28, 1 April 2009 (UTC)

Han Wenhai (Chinese: 韩文海; born 28 January 1971) is a Chinese former football goalkeeper. The Chinese football goalkeeper Han Wenxia is his sister.

== Biography ==
Han Wenhai began his professional football career with Dalian Shide and was one of the first goalkeepers in China to accept the guidance of British coaches to aid players achieve professionalism. This would greatly help him rise to prominence during the 1996 league season when he established himself as Dalian's first-choice goalkeeper and aided the team to win the league title. His performances would see him included in the Chinese squad that took part in the 1996 AFC Asian Cup where he played understudy to Ou Chuliang. This was then followed by several FIFA World Cup qualifying games, however he struggled to replace Ou as the team's goalkeeper and despite being called up to several squads he found another goalkeeper Jiang Jin pushing ahead of him for the goalkeeper position. At Dalian he remained the team's number one goalkeeper for the next several years and won three more league titles until he left at the end of the 2000 league season when he was replaced by Chen Dong.

Han Wenhai would join second tier side Zhejiang Greentown in 2001 and would go on to play eighteen league games, however he only stayed for one season before joining top tier Shenyang Ginde at the beginning of the 2002 league season. Han stayed with Shenyang for three seasons before retiring at the end of the 2004 league season.

== Coaching career ==
In 2003, Han was appointed as assistant coach of Shenyang Ginde.

== Honours ==
=== Club ===
Dalian Shide

- Chinese Jia-A League: 1996, 1997, 1998, 2000

=== Individual ===
- China Team of the year: 1996, 1997

== Personal life ==
His sister Han Wenxia was a goalkeeper for China women's national football team.
