= Huang Long (footballer, born 1981) =

Chinese association football player

Personal information
- Date of birth: 13 January 1981 (age 45)
- Place of birth: Meizhou, China
- Height: 1.81 m (5 ft 11 in)
- Position: Midfielder

Youth career
- –2001: Shenzhen Ping An

Senior career*
Years	Team	Apps	(Gls)
2002–2004	Xiamen Jixiangshishi	21	(0)
2005–2009	Hangzhou Greentown	73	(12)
2010	Shenzhen Ruby	27	(1)
2011–2013	Guangzhou R&F	24	(3)
2013	→ Shenzhen Fengpeng (loan)	6	(0)
2014	Meixian Hakka	15	(2)
2015–2016	Shenzhen FC	14	(0)
2017–2018	Meixian Techand	16	(0)
- * Club domestic league appearances and goals as of 14:01, 6 June 2019 (UTC)

Huang Long (simplified Chinese: 黄隆; traditional Chinese: 黃隆; pinyin: Huáng Lóng; born 13 January 1981) is a Chinese footballer.

== Career statistics ==
=== Club ===
As of 6 June 2019.

Club	Season	League			Cup		Continental		Other		Total	
Club	Season	Division	Apps	Goals	Apps	Goals	Apps	Goals	Apps	Goals	Apps	Goals
Xiamen Blue Lions	2002	Chinese Jia-B League	0	0	0	0	–		0	0	0	0
Xiamen Blue Lions	2003	Chinese Jia-B League	21	0	0	0	–		0	0	21	0
Xiamen Blue Lions	2004	Chinese Jia-B League	21	0	0	0	–		0	0	21	0
Xiamen Blue Lions	Total		21	0	0	0	0	0	0	0	21	0
Hangzhou Greentown	2005	China League One	62	11	0	0	–		0	0	62	11
Hangzhou Greentown	2006	China League One	62	11	0	0	–		0	0	62	11
Hangzhou Greentown	2007	Chinese Super League	62	11	0	0	–		0	0	62	11
Hangzhou Greentown	2008	Chinese Super League	62	11	0	0	–		0	0	62	11
Hangzhou Greentown	2009	Chinese Super League	11	1	0	0	–		0	0	11	1
Hangzhou Greentown	Total		73	12	0	0	0	0	0	0	73	12
Shenzhen Ruby	2010	Chinese Super League	27	1	0	0	–		0	0	27	1
Guangzhou R&F	2011	China League One	24	3	0	0	–		0	0	24	3
Guangzhou R&F	2012	Chinese Super League	0	0	0	0	–		0	0	0	0
Guangzhou R&F	2013	Chinese Super League	0	0	0	0	–		0	0	0	0
Guangzhou R&F	Total		24	3	0	0	0	0	0	0	24	3
Shenzhen Fengpeng (loan)	2013	China League Two	6	0	1 (Note: Appearances in the Chinese FA Cup)	0	–		0	0	7	0
Meixian Hakka	2014	China League Two	15	2	0	0	–		0	0	15	2
Shenzhen FC	2015	China League One	14	0	1	0	–		0	0	15	0
Shenzhen FC	2016	China League One	0	0	0	0	–		0	0	0	0
Shenzhen FC	Total		14	0	1	0	0	0	0	0	15	0
Meixian Techand	2017	China League Two	16	0	1	0	–		3 (Note: Appearances in the China League Two playoffs)	0	20	0
Meixian Techand	2018	China League One	0	0	0	0	–		0	0	0	0
Meixian Techand	Total		16	0	1	0	0	0	3	0	20	0
Career total			196	18	3	0	0	0	3	0	202	18
