= Dalian Polytechnic University =

Public university in Dalian, China

Coordinates: 38°58′16″N 121°31′51″E

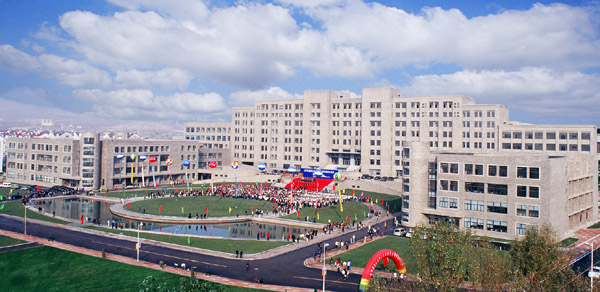
Dalian Polytechnic University, Dalian, China

Dalian Polytechnic University (Chinese: 大连工业大学; lit. 'Dalian Industrial University') is a public university in Dalian, Liaoning, China.

== History ==
The school was founded in 1958 in Shenyang as the Shenyang Institute of Light Industry (Chinese: 沈阳轻工业学院). In 1970, the institute moved to Dalian and renamed to the Dalian Institute of Light Industry (Chinese: 大连轻工业学院). In 2006, previously holding the college status, the institute received its university status and renamed to Dalian Polytechnic University.

It is the only institution of higher education in northeastern China specializing in light industry, food, textiles, and art design. There are about 15,000 students on the 85-acre (340,000 m^{2}) campus. Subjects taught include engineering, science, arts, management, and economics.

In 2025, the university expelled a female student for "improper contact with a foreigner" and "damaged national dignity," after videos circulated that suggested she had been intimate with a Ukrainian gamer. The report publicly disclosed the full name of the student.
