= Yunnan Lijiang Dongba F.C. =

Chinese football club

Yunnan Lijiang Dongba 云南丽江东巴
- Full name: Yunnan Lijiang Dongba FC 云南丽江东巴足球俱乐部
- Ground: City Stadium, Lijiang, Yunnan, China
- League: China League
Home colours	Away colours

Yunnan Lijiang Dongba (Simplified Chinese: 云南丽江东巴) was a Chinese football club based in Yunnan, China. It competed in the China League Two between 2004 and 2006.

After Yunnan Hongta was merged with Chongqing Lifan at the end of the 2003 season, a lot of Yunnan players became expandable and were seeking playing opportunities elsewhere. In February 2004 Yunnan Lijiang Dongba was established and was mainly consisted of the reserve team members of Yunnan Hongta and ranked third in the China League Two. After failing to gain promotion from the League Two in 2006, the team was disbanded.
