= Xie Yuxin =

Chinese footballer and manager

Xie Yuxin 谢育新
Personal information
- Full name: Xie Yuxin
- Date of birth: 12 October 1968 (age 58)
- Place of birth: Xingning, Guangdong, China
- Height: 1.69 m (5 ft 7 in)
- Position: Midfielder

Youth career
- 1980–1985: Guangdong team
- 1985: Chinese Junior National Youth Team
- 1986: Chinese National Youth Team

Senior career*
| Years | Team | Apps | (Gls) |
| 1987–1989 | PEC Zwolle | 0 | (0) |
| 1989–1992 | Team Guangdong | ? | (?) |
| 1993–1995 | Guangdong Winnerway | 41 | (10) |
| 1996 | Guangzhou Matsunichi | 17 | (1) |
| 1997 | Guangdong Winnerway | 22 | (3) |
| 1998–2001 | Shenyang Sealion | 73 | (2) |
| 2002–2003 | Guangdong Mingfeng | | |
| 2004 | Sinchi FC | 13 | (1) |
| 2005 | AD Va Luen | 3 | (1) |
| 2005 | Hunan Shoking | | |

International career
| 1989–1996 | China | 42 | (8) |

Managerial career
- 2004: Sinchi FC
- 2005: Hunan Shoking
- 2013–2016: Guangzhou R&F Reserved
- 2017: Lhasa Urban Construction Investment
- 2018: Shaanxi Chang'an Athletic
- 2022–2024: Guangxi Lanhang
- 2024: Ganzhou Ruishi
Medal record
Men's football
Representing China
AFC Asian Cup
| Bronze medal – third place | 1992 Japan | Team |
Asian Games
| Silver medal – second place | 1994 Hiroshima | Football |
- * Club domestic league appearances and goals

Xie Yuxin (simplified Chinese: 谢育新; traditional Chinese: 謝育新; pinyin: Xiè Yùxīn; Jyutping: Che6 Yuk6 San1; born 12 October 1968 in Xingning, Guangdong) is a retired Chinese international footballer. He made more than 100 appearances for his country in international competitions.

On 6 February 1987, Yuxin signed for PEC Zwolle '82, becoming the first Chinese person to play professional football abroad. He also held the record for being the youngest footballer, 1987–1996, at the age of 18 and youngest scorer, 1988–2003, at the age of 19, for the China national football team.

== Club career ==
Xie Yuxin was a diminutive but highly skilled promising young player who was scouted and then transferred to Dutch football club FC Zwolle and would become the first Chinese player to play in professional football abroad. Unable to help them stay in the Eredivisie he would return to China with Team Guangdong. With the advent of professionalism within China he would go on to join top tier side Guangdong Winnerway and quickly establish himself as a regular within team. For the next several seasons he would become a vital member within the team's midfield as their creative midfielder until the 1996 league season saw him leave to join newly promoted side Guangzhou Matsunichi. Despite the better pay at his new club he would only stay for one season because of the problems he had with the manager, before returning to Guangdong. His return at Guangdong did not turn out as successful as he had hoped, despite regaining his place back into the team the club had a terrible season that saw them relegated. Considering retiring Xie Yuxin was offered the chance to join Shenyang Sealion and a chance to continue to play in the top tier. Taking this opportunity he became a regular within the team as well as their captain until he decided to leave at the end of the 2001 league season, where he effectively retired. Despite this he took on numerous player coaching roles and officially retired in 2005 with Hunan Shoking.

== International career ==
Xie Yuxin was called up for the national team to play Football at the 1988 Summer Olympics. He later participated in the 1988 AFC Asian Cup, where he played a vital part in the team's fourth-place finish.

== International goals ==
| No. | Date | Venue | Opponent | Score | Result | Competition |
|---|---|---|---|---|---|---|
| 1. | 4 December 1988 | Qatar SC Stadium, Doha, Qatar | Syria | 2–0 | 3–0 | 1988 AFC Asian Cup |
| 2. | 4 December 1988 | Qatar SC Stadium, Doha, Qatar | Syria | 3–0 | 3–0 | 1988 AFC Asian Cup |
| 3. | 24 October 1989 | Kallang, Singapore | North Korea | 1–0 | 1–0 | 1990 FIFA World Cup qualification |
| 4. | 23 September 1990 | Beijing, China | Pakistan | 1–0 | 3–0 | 1990 Asian Games |
| 5. | 23 September 1990 | Beijing, China | Pakistan | 2–0 | 3–0 | 1990 Asian Games |
| 6. | 25 September 1990 | Beijing, China | Singapore | 1–0 | 5–1 | 1990 Asian Games |
| 7. | 26 April 1992 | Kallang, Singapore | Singapore | 1–0 | 1–0 | 1992 AFC Asian Cup qualification |
| 8. | 6 November 1992 | Hiroshima, Japan | Japan | 1–0 | 2–3 | 1992 AFC Asian Cup |

== Management career ==
At the end of 2001 league season, Xie Yuxin began teaching football in Guangdong when he was playing for Guangdong Mingfeng. In early 2003, he started to lead an expedition to Singapore to coach young players to participate in the Singapore's S. League. This led to a coaching position in 2004 at Dongguan Dongcheng and then Hunan Shoking. In October 2005 he took a position as a coach in a Tibetan side, however just 47 days in Tibet he left because of conflicts from his employers and local players, which then lead to him taking a position as coach for Macau. In 2008, he took an assistant coach position at Chinese Super League side Shenzhen Xiangxue Eisiti, until 2010 when he joined Nanjing Yoyo as an assistant coach.

== Personal life ==
Xie Yuxin's son, Xie Weijun, is also a footballer who currently plays for Tianjin TEDA in the Chinese Super League.
