= Reza Rezaeimanesh =

Iranian footballer

Personal information
- Full name: Reza Rezaeimanesh
- Date of birth: July 2, 1969 (age 57)
- Place of birth: Tehran, Iran
- Position: Right wing back

Senior career*
Years	Team	Apps	(Gls)
–1990	Esteghlal Jonoob		
1990–1994	Pas	65	(3)
1994–1999	Bahman	74	(3)
1999–2000	Geylang		

International career
1992–1998	Iran	14	(0)
- * Club domestic league appearances and goals

Reza Rezaeimanesh (Persian: رضا رضائی منش, born July 2, 1969) is an Iranian retired football Right wingback. He played for Esteghlal Jonub Tehran F.C., Pas F.C., Bahman F.C. and the Iranian national football team. He also had a stint with Singaporean side Geylang in 1997.
