= Wang Tao (footballer, born 1987) =

Chinese association football player

Personal information
- Date of birth: 28 October 1987 (age 39)
- Height: 1.79 m (5 ft 10 in)
- Position: Defender

Senior career*
Years	Team	Apps	(Gls)
2009	Shenzhen Asia Travel	5	(0)
- * Club domestic league appearances and goals

Wang Tao (; born 28 October 1987) is a former Chinese footballer.

== Career statistics ==
=== Club ===
Club	Season	League			Cup		Continental		Other		Total	
Club	Season	Division	Apps	Goals	Apps	Goals	Apps	Goals	Apps	Goals	Apps	Goals
Shenzhen Asia Travel	2009	Chinese Super League	5	0	0	0	–		0	0	5	0
Career total			5	0	0	0	0	0	0	0	5	0
