= Milen Georgiev =

Bulgarian footballer

Personal information
- Full name: Milen Dimitrov Georgiev
- Date of birth: 7 May 1974 (age 52)
- Place of birth: Burgas, Bulgaria
- Position: Forward

Senior career*
Years	Team	Apps	(Gls)
1994–2000	Naftex Burgas	108	(23)
2000	Chongqing Longxin	26	(8)
2001	Beijing Guoan	21	(3)
2001–2002	Panionios	8	(0)
2002–2003	Spartak Varna	21	(3)
2003	Dynamo St Petersburg	9	(0)
2004	Naftex Burgas	8	(2)
2004	Lierse	1	(0)
2005	Nesebar	12	(2)
2005–2006	Chernomorets Burgas	9	(5)

International career
1996	Bulgaria	2	(0)
- * Club domestic league appearances and goals

Milen Georgiev (Bulgarian: Милен Георгиев; born 7 May 1974) is a Bulgarian former professional footballer who played as a forward.

== Honours ==
Chongqing Longxin

- Chinese FA Cup: 2000
