= Kajohn Punnaves =

Thai footballer

Personal information
- Full name: Kajohn Punnaves
- Place of birth: Thailand
- Position: Forward

Senior career*
Years	Team	Apps	(Gls)
19??–1997	Police United		
1998	BEC Tero Sasana		
1999–2001	Police United		

International career
1992	Thailand	2	(0)

Managerial career
- 2010: Chiangrai United
- * Club domestic league appearances and goals

Kajohn Punnaves is a Thai retired football forward who played for Thailand in the 1992 Asian Cup.
