= Zhai Zhenhua =

Chinese autobiographical writer (born 1951)

Zhai Zhenhua (Chinese: 翟振華, born 1951) is a Chinese autobiographical writer known for her memoir Red Flower of China, which detailed her teenage participation in Mao's Cultural Revolution.

== Life ==
Zhai Zhenhua joined the Red Guard and as a fifteen-year-old participated in the violence of the Cultural Revolution. She was later herself purged, but rehabilitated after working on the land and in a factory.

She eventually emigrated to Canada, where she wrote her autobiography.

== Works ==
- Red Flower of China, New York: Soho, 1993.
