= Zhai Yanpeng =

Chinese footballer

Zhai Yanpeng 翟彦鹏
Personal information
- Date of birth: 6 December 1982 (age 43)
- Place of birth: Baoding, China
- Height: 1.82 m (6 ft 0 in)
- Positions: Defender; midfielder

Senior career*
| Years | Team | Apps | (Gls) |
| 2001–2003 | Bayi Football Team | 65 | (1) |
| 2004–2008 | Dalian Shide | 75 | (2) |

International career^{‡}
| 2007–2008 | China PR | 3 | (0) |
- * Club domestic league appearances and goals as of 21 March 2007 ‡ National team caps and goals as of 24 December 2008

Zhai Yanpeng (Chinese: 翟彦鹏; born December 6, 1982) is a former Chinese football player who played for Bayi Football Team and Dalian Shide as a versatile defender and midfielder. After winning the Chinese league and Cup with Dalian Shide, he was soon called up to the Chinese national team in 2007; however, in early 2008 he was forced to end his career as a professional footballer at the age of 26, due to being diagnosed with cerebral infarction.

== Club career ==
=== Bayi Football Team ===
Zhai Yanpeng began his football career in 1993 playing for the Bayi Football Team youth and reserve teams before graduating to their senior team in 2001. In his first season, he quickly established himself as a versatile footballer and quickly became a first team regular when he played in 23 league games. For the next two seasons he was an integral member of the Bayi team until they disbanded in 2003 and were removed from the top tier.

== International career ==
The Chinese head coach Zhu Guanghu gave Zhai Yanpeng his debut on March 27, 2007, in a friendly game against Uzbekistan in a 3–1 victory in preparation for the 2007 AFC Asian Cup and used Zhai Yanpeng as a defensive midfielder. Unable to make the squad for the Asian Cup, he was still highly regarded by the new Chinese Head coach Vladimir Petrović to play in several friendlies until his condition forced him to retire.

== Honours ==
Dalian Shide

- Chinese Super League: 2005
- Chinese FA Cup: 2005
