= Hunan Shoking F.C. =

Chinese football club

Hunan Shoking Húnán Xiāngjūn 湖南湘军
- Full name: Hunan Shoking Football Club 湖南湘军足球俱乐部
- Founded: 15 January 2004; 21 years ago
- Dissolved: 2006

Hunan Shoking Football Club (simplified Chinese: 湖南湘军; traditional Chinese: 湖南湘軍; pinyin: Húnán Xiāngjūn) was a professional Chinese football club based in Changsha, Hunan Province, and participated in the China League One division under licence from the Chinese Football Association (CFA), after taking over Chongqing Lifan's place in the league before the 2014 season, but was relegated and dissolved after spending three seasons there.

== History ==
Before the start of the 2004 Chinese football league season, Chongqing Lifan annexed Yunnan Hongta and took over their place in Chinese Super League. A new club, Hunan Shoking F.C., was formed by Hunan Corun New Energy Co. Ltd. (湖南科力远新能源有限公司) by merging existing two amateur teams already representing Hunan Province, Yiyang Corun and Hunan Wuqiang Hongdao, to take over Chongqing Lifan's spot in China League One by buying the club's registration into the division for 20 million Yuan. On January 15, 2004, the club was inaugurated into the Chinese football league. They hired former Chinese Olympic medalist Xiong Ni as their chairman and former Chinese international footballer Zhu Bo as their first manager. Playing in the 55,000-seat Helong Stadium in Changsha, the club had international players – Fu Bin and Srđan Bajčetić – while the youth team called Xiangxue Pharmaceutical participated in the 2004–05 Hong Kong First Division League to gain experience. Although the youth team had limited success, the senior team fared little better and struggled in their debut season by finishing tenth at the end.

The following season was extremely difficult for the club, Miloš Hrstić came in as manager but had an extremely high-profile dispute with the owners about unpaid wages. It was soon discovered that the club were in financial difficulties due to an excessive wage bill for their players along with renting of Helong Stadium. The ownership of the club moved to the company Bailong and their general manager Sun Yingui for a brief period. However this was short-lived and Hunan Corun took over the club again. While this was going on Li Hui was managing the side with little success. He and his players reached a breaking point after a humiliating 5–1 defeat to Shanghai Yungtay on June 18, 2005, in a Chinese FA Cup game. Li Hui publicly criticized his players' lack of commitment before deciding to leave the club. Wang Tao was brought in as his replacement to manage the club. The team finished in a disappointing twelfth but remained in the league. Li Kejia was brought in as a new manager in the 2006 league season, but was unable to stop the losing streak of the club in the new season, to the point when former Chinese international Hao Haidong was brought in as a General manager to help with the team. This turned out to be fruitless and the club finished at the bottom of the league, relegated to the third tier, and the club was dissolved soon afterwards.

== Managerial history ==
- (China) Zhu Bo 15 January 2004 – 27 November 2004
- (China) Xie Yuxin 21 December 2004 – 1 February 2005
- (Croatia) Miloš Hrstić 14 February 2005 – 29 April 2005
- (China) Li Hui 10 May 2005 – 27 June 2005
- (China) Fu Bin (caretaker) 27–30 June 2005
- (China) Wang Tao 30 June–24 July 2005
- (China) Xu Zhengyin 1 August–November 2005
- (Croatia) Miloš Hrstić 24 November 2005 – 1 May 2006
- (China) Wang Shihai (caretaker) 1 May-11 July 2006
- (China) Li Kejia 11 July-28 October 2006

== Results ==
All-time league rankings

Year	Div	Pld	W	D	L	GF	GA	GD	Pts	Pos.	FA Cup	Super Cup	AFC	Att./G	Stadium
2004	2	32	7	10	15	34	51	−17	31	14	R1	DNQ	DNQ		Xiangtan City Sports Center; Helong Stadium; Hunan Provincial People's Stadium
2005	2	26	5	4	17	24	56	−32	19	12	R2	DNQ	DNQ		Helong Stadium; Liuyang City Sports Center
2006	2	24	2	9	13	16	33	−17	15	13	R1	DNQ	DNQ		Helong Stadium
