= Zhao Lin (footballer) =

Chinese footballer

Zhao Lin 赵琳
Personal information
- Full name: Zhao Lin
- Date of birth: 15 February 1966 (age 60)
- Place of birth: Dalian, Liaoning, China
- Height: 1.80 m (5 ft 11 in)
- Position: Defender

Youth career
- 1965–1976: Dalian

Senior career*
Years	Team	Apps	(Gls)
1985–1997	Dalian Wanda		
1997	→ Chengdu Wuniu (loan)		
1998–2000	Xiamen Fairwiell		
2001	Dalian Sidelong		
2002	Dalian Sundy		

International career
1993	China	1	(0)

Managerial career
- 2001: Dalian Sidelong (assistant)
- 2002: Dalian Sundy (assistant)
- 2003–2004: Dalian Shide (assistant)
Medal record
Men's football
Representing China
AFC Asian Cup
Bronze medal – third place	1992 Japan	Team
- * Club domestic league appearances and goals

Zhao Lin (Chinese: 赵琳; born 15 February 1966) is a former Chinese footballer. He was included in the Chinese national squad that played during the 1992 AFC Asian Cup; however, he did not feature in any of the games.

== Club career ==
Zhao Lin started his youth career with Dalian in 1983. In 1985, he joined Dalian's first team, his position changed from striker to central defender. Zhao became a regular player for Dalian after 1989. In 1994, he was a member of Dalian Wanda to win the Champions of Chinese Jia-A League 1994. However, he suffered a left leg knee meniscus injury in the season, and lost his position after he return to the club.

In 1997, Zhao was on loan to China League Two side Chengdu Wuniu. He helped the Chengdu Wuniu win the runners-up in that season and promote to Jia-B League. In 1998, he transferred to Xiamen Fairwiell and won the champion of Jia-B league in the 1999 season. In the secondary transfer after six months of the 2000 season, he chose to leave the team. In 2001, Zhao went to Dalian Sidelong and work as the captain, Dalian Sidelong won the championship of China League Two and upgrade successfully. In 2002, he joined Dalian Sundy, but when they were eliminated by Guangdong Xiongying and failed to gain promotion, Zhao announced his retirement.

In 2003, Zhao began to work as assistant coach of Dalian Shide and coach of reserve team. He left the club in 2004.

== International career ==
In 1992, Zhao was called up to China by Klaus Schlappner and included in the Chinese squad for the 1992 AFC Asian Cup, however he did not feature in any of the games. On 28 March 1993, he made his debut for China in a 0–0 draw against United Arab Emirates. He then suffered a left leg ligament tear and quit from the national team. After that, he never got a chance to play for the China national team.

== Honours ==
=== Club ===
Dalian Wanda

- Chinese Jia-A League: 1994, 1996
- Chinese FA Cup: 1992

Xiamen Fairwiell

- Chinese Jia B League: 1999

Dalian Sidelong

- Chinese Yi League: 2001
