= Wang Tao (footballer, born 1967) =

Chinese footballer

Wang Tao 王涛
Personal information
- Date of birth: 1967 (age 58–59)
- Place of birth: Dalian, Liaoning, China
- Height: 1.80 m (5 ft 11 in)
- Position: Midfielder

Senior career*
Years	Team	Apps	(Gls)
–1994	Bayi		
1994–1995	Dalian Wanda		
1995	Bayi		
1996–1999	Beijing Guoan		
2000–2002	Bayi		

International career
1990–1995	China		

Managerial career
- 2003: Bayi (assistant)
- 2004: Hunan Shoking (assistant)
- 2004–2005: Shaanxi Guoli
- 2006: Guangxi Tianji
- 2007: Anhui Jiufang
Medal record
Men's football
Representing China
Asian Games
Silver medal – second place	1994 Hiroshima	Football
- * Club domestic league appearances and goals

Wang Tao (王涛, colloquially known as Big Wang Tao 大王涛; born 1967) is a Chinese former football player and coach. A midfielder, he played for Beijing Guoan and for the China national team from 1990 until 1995. Wang was born in Dalian. When he left Bayi to join Beijing Guoan in 1996, the transfer paid for him, 660,000 yuan, was a new record.
