= List of Chinese football champions =

The Chinese football champions indicates all past winners of the Chinese top-tier football league since it first started in 1951.

The professional football league of China was found in 1994 as the Chinese Jia-A League (甲A联赛). After ten years of existence, the Chinese FA decided to create a new top tier league known as the Chinese Super League.

Since 1994, 33 professional seasons have been contested, with 23 seasons as the Chinese Super League. Dalian Shide and Guangzhou FC are the most successful teams in the professional period with eight titles each. Dalian won three consecutive titles on two occasions (1996–1998 and 2000–2002), while Guangzhou won seven consecutive titles from 2011 to 2017.

== List of champions ==
Italic indicates defunct clubs.

=== National Football era (1951–1986) ===
==== National Football Championship (1951–1953) ====
Season	Champions	Runners-up	Third place
1951	North East China	East China	Army
1953	Army	North East China	East China

==== National Football League (1954–1955) ====
Season	Champions	Runners-up	Third place
1954	North East China (2)	South Central China	East China
1955	Central Sports Institute	Dalian Shipyards	Locomotive (Railways)

==== National Football Jia League (1956–1962) ====
Season	Champions	Runners-up	Third place
1956	Beijing Youth B	Shanghai Sports Institute	Shenyang Sports Institute
1957	Beijing Youth (2)	Tianjin	August 1st
1958	Beijing	Shenyang	Tianjin
1960	Tianjin	Liaoning	Shanghai
1961	Shanghai	August 1st	Tianjin
1962	Shanghai (2)	August 1st	Liaoning

==== National Football League (1963) ====
Season	Champions	Runners-up	Third place
1963	Beijing Youth (3)	Liaoning	Tianjin

==== National Football Jia League (1964–1965) ====
Season	Champions	Runners-up	Third place
1964	Beijing Sports Institute	Shanghai	August 1st
1965	Jilin	August 1st	Beijing

==== National Football League (1973–1977) ====
Season	Champions	Runners-up	Third place
1973	Beijing (2)	Shanghai	Liaoning
1974	August 1st (2)	Tianjin	Beijing
1977	August 1st (3)	Beijing	Guangdong

==== National Football Jia League (1978–1986) ====
Season	Champions	Runners-up	Third place
1978	Liaoning	August 1st	Beijing
1979	Guangdong	Liaoning	August 1st
1980	Tianjin (2)	Liaoning	Beijing Army Unit
1981	August 1st (4)	Shandong	Beijing
1982	Beijing (3)	Shandong	Tianjin
1984	Beijing (4)	Tianjin	Liaoning
1985	Liaoning Dongyao (2)	August 1st	Dalian Pearl
1986	August 1st (5)	Hubei	Beijing

=== Semi-professional era (1987–1993) ===
==== Jia-A League (1987–1993) ====
The Chinese Football Association (CFA) allowed enterprises to sponsor and invest in football teams, and as a result, the league entered a semi-professional era in 1987 season.

Season	Champions	Runners-up	Third place
1987	Liaoning Dongyao (3)	Tianjin Seagull	Shanghai
1988	Liaoning Dongyao (4)	China B	Tianjin Seagull
1989	China B	Liaoning Dongyao	Shenzhou Shanghai
1990	Liaoning Dongyao (5)	August 1st	Dalian Xinghai
1991	Liaoning Dongyao (6)	Shanghai Shenhua	Beijing Shenzhou
1992	Liaoning Dongyao (7)	Guangzhou Baiyun	Dalian Xinghai
1993	Liaoning Dongyao (8)	Guangdong Hongyuan	Beijing Guoan

=== Professional era (1994–present) ===
==== Jia-A League (1994–2003) ====
Chinese Jia-A League became China's first professional football league with the start of the 1994 season.

Season	Champions	Runners-up	Third place
1994	Dalian Wanda	Guangzhou Apollo	Shanghai Shenhua
1995	Shanghai Shenhua (3)	Beijing Guoan	Dalian Wanda
1996	Dalian Wanda (2)	Shanghai Shenhua	Bayi
1997	Dalian Wanda (3)	Shanghai Shenhua	Beijing Guoan
1998	Dalian Wanda (4)	Shanghai Shenhua	Beijing Guoan
1999	Shandong Luneng Taishan	Liaoning	Sichuan Quanxing
2000	Dalian Shide (5)	Shanghai Shenhua	Sichuan Quanxing
2001	Dalian Shide (6)	Shanghai Shenhua	Liaoning
2002	Dalian Shide (7)	Shenzhen Ping An	Beijing Guoan
2003	Not awarded	Shanghai International	Dalian Shide

==== Super League (2004–present) ====
In 2002, the CFA announced the establishment of the Chinese Super League, which began in the 2004 season with the aim of introducing truly commercial methods and allowing the professional football market in China to operate more freely.

Season	Champions	Runners-up	Third place
2004	Shenzhen Jianlibao	Shandong Luneng Taishan	Inter Shanghai
2005	Dalian Shide (8)	Shanghai Shenhua	Shandong Luneng Taishan
2006	Shandong Luneng Taishan (2)	Shanghai Shenhua	Beijing Guoan
2007	Changchun Yatai	Beijing Guoan	Shandong Luneng Taishan
2008	Shandong Luneng Taishan (3)	Shanghai Shenhua	Beijing Guoan
2009	Beijing Guoan	Changchun Yatai	Henan Construction
2010	Shandong Luneng Taishan (4)	Tianjin TEDA	Shanghai Shenhua
2011	Guangzhou Evergrande	Beijing Guoan	Liaoning Whowin
2012	Guangzhou Evergrande (2)	Jiangsu Sainty	Beijing Guoan
2013	Guangzhou Evergrande (3)	Shandong Luneng Taishan	Beijing Guoan
2014	Guangzhou Evergrande (4)	Beijing Guoan	Guangzhou R&F
2015	Guangzhou Evergrande Taobao (5)	Shanghai SIPG	Shandong Luneng Taishan
2016	Guangzhou Evergrande Taobao (6)	Jiangsu Suning	Shanghai SIPG
2017	Guangzhou Evergrande Taobao (7)	Shanghai SIPG	Tianjin Quanjian
2018	Shanghai SIPG	Guangzhou Evergrande Taobao	Shandong Luneng Taishan
2019	Guangzhou Evergrande Taobao (8)	Beijing Guoan	Shanghai SIPG
2020	Jiangsu Suning	Guangzhou Evergrande Taobao	Beijing Guoan
2021	Shandong Taishan (5)	Shanghai Port	Guangzhou
2022	Wuhan Three Towns	Shandong Taishan	Zhejiang
2023	Shanghai Port (2)	Shandong Taishan	Zhejiang
2024	Shanghai Port (3)	Shanghai Shenhua	Chengdu Rongcheng
2025	Shanghai Port (4)	Shanghai Shenhua	Chengdu Rongcheng
2026	Dalian Yingbo	Chengdu Rongcheng	Beijing Guoan

== Total titles won ==
Clubs in bold compete in the Chinese Super League as of the 2027 season. Italics indicates defunct clubs.

=== Super League era (2004–present) ===
Club	Champions	Runners-up	Winning seasons	Runners-up seasons
Guangzhou	8	2	2011, 2012, 2013, 2014, 2015, 2016, 2017, 2019	2018, 2020
**Shandong Taishan**	4	4	2006, 2008, 2010, 2021	2004, 2013, 2022, 2023
**Shanghai Port**	4	3	2018, 2023, 2024, 2025	2015, 2017, 2021
**Beijing Guoan**	1	4	2009	2007, 2011, 2014, 2019
Jiangsu	1	2	2020	2012, 2016
Changchun Yatai	1	1	2007	2009
Shenzhen	1	0	2004	
Dalian Shide	1	0	2005	
Wuhan Three Towns	1	0	2022	
**Dalian Yingbo**	1	0	2026	
**Shanghai Shenhua**	0	5		2005, 2006, 2008, 2024, 2025
**Tianjin Jinmen Tiger**	0	1		2010
**Chengdu Rongcheng**	0	1		2026

=== All professional era (1994–present) ===
Club	Champions	Runners-up	Winning seasons	Runners-up seasons
Guangzhou	8	3	2011, 2012, 2013, 2014, 2015, 2016, 2017, 2019	1994, 2018, 2020
Dalian Shide	8	0	1994, 1996, 1997, 1998, 2000, 2001, 2002, 2005	
**Shandong Taishan**	5	4	1999, 2006, 2008, 2010, 2021	2004, 2013, 2022, 2023
**Shanghai Port**	4	3	2018, 2023, 2024, 2025	2015, 2017, 2021
**Shanghai Shenhua**	1	10	1995	1996, 1997, 1998, 2000, 2001, 2005, 2006, 2008, 2024, 2025
**Beijing Guoan**	1	5	2009	1995, 2007, 2011, 2014, 2019
Jiangsu	1	2	2020	2012, 2016
Shenzhen	1	1	2004	2002
Changchun Yatai	1	1	2007	2009
Wuhan Three Towns	1	0	2022	
**Dalian Yingbo**	1	0	2026	
Liaoning	0	1		1999
Beijing Chengfeng	0	1		2003
**Tianjin Jinmen Tiger**	0	1		2010
**Chengdu Rongcheng**	0	1		2026

=== All-time (1951–present) ===
Club	Champions	Runners-up	Winning seasons	Runners-up seasons
Liaoning	8	6	1978, 1985, 1987, 1988, 1990, 1991, 1992, 1993	1960, 1963, 1979, 1980, 1989, 1999
Guangzhou	8	4	2011, 2012, 2013, 2014, 2015, 2016, 2017, 2019	1992, 1994, 2018, 2020
Dalian Shide	8	0	1994, 1996, 1997, 1998, 2000, 2001, 2002, 2005	
Bayi	5	6	1953, 1974, 1977, 1981, 1986	1961, 1962, 1965, 1978, 1985, 1990
**Shandong Taishan**	5	6	1999, 2006, 2008, 2010, 2021	1981, 1982, 2004, 2013, 2022, 2023
**Shanghai Port**	4	3	2018, 2023, 2024, 2025	2015, 2017, 2021
Beijing	4	1	1958, 1973, 1982, 1984	1977
**Shanghai Shenhua**	3	13	1961, 1962, 1995	1964, 1973, 1991, 1996, 1997, 1998, 2000, 2001, 2005, 2006, 2008, 2024, 2025
Beijing Youth	3	0	1956, 1957, 1963	
**Tianjin Jinmen Tiger**	2	5	1960, 1980	1957, 1974, 1984, 1987, 2010
North East China	2	1	1951, 1954	1953
**Beijing Guoan**	1	5	2009	1995, 2007, 2011, 2014, 2019
Jiangsu	1	2	2020	2012, 2016
Guangdong Winnerway	1	1	1979	1993
China B	1	1	1989	1988
Shenzhen	1	1	2004	2002
Changchun Yatai	1	1	2007	2009
Central Sports Institute	1	0	1955	
Beijing Sports Institute	1	0	1964	
Yanbian Funde	1	0	1965	
Wuhan Three Towns	1	0	2022	
**Dalian Yingbo**	1	0	2026	
East China	0	1		1951
South Central China	0	1		1954
Dalian Shipyards	0	1		1955
Shanghai Sports Institute	0	1		1956
Shenyang	0	1		1958
Hubei	0	1		1986
Beijing Chengfeng	0	1		2003
**Chengdu Rongcheng**	0	1		2026

== Total titles won by province ==
=== Super League era (2004–present) ===
Province	Number of titles	Clubs
Guangdong	9	Guangzhou (8), Shenzhen (1)
Shandong	4	Shandong Taishan (4)
Shanghai	4	Shanghai Port (4)
Liaoning	2	Dalian Shide (1), Dalian Yingbo (1)
Jilin	1	Changchun Yatai (1)
Beijing	1	Beijing Guoan (1)
Jiangsu	1	Jiangsu (1)
Hubei	1	Wuhan Three Towns (1)

=== All professional era (1994–present) ===
Province	Number of titles	Clubs
Guangdong	9	Guangzhou (8), Shenzhen (1)
Liaoning	9	Dalian Shide (8), Dalian Yingbo (1)
Shandong	5	Shandong Taishan (5)
Shanghai	5	Shanghai Port (4), Shanghai Shenhua (1)
Jilin	1	Changchun Yatai (1)
Beijing	1	Beijing Guoan (1)
Jiangsu	1	Jiangsu (1)
Hubei	1	Wuhan Three Towns (1)

== Total titles won by region ==
=== Super League era (2004–present) ===
Region	Number of titles	Clubs
South Central	10	Guangzhou (8), Shenzhen (1), Wuhan Three Towns (1)
East	9	Shandong Taishan (4), Shanghai Port (4), Jiangsu (1)
Northeast	3	Changchun Yatai (1), Dalian Shide (1), Dalian Yingbo (1)
North	1	Beijing Guoan (1)

=== All professional era (1994–present) ===
Region	Number of titles	Clubs
East	11	Shandong Taishan (5), Shanghai Port (4), Shanghai Shenhua (1), Jiangsu (1)
South Central	10	Guangzhou (8), Shenzhen (1), Wuhan Three Towns (1)
Northeast	10	Dalian Shide (8), Changchun Yatai (1), Dalian Yingbo (1)
North	1	Beijing Guoan (1)
