= Fu Yubin =

Chinese footballer

Fu Yubin 傅玉斌
Personal information
- Full name: Fu Yubin
- Date of birth: 9 August 1963 (age 63)
- Place of birth: Dalian, China
- Height: 1.78 m (5 ft 10 in)
- Position: Goalkeeper

Senior career*
Years	Team	Apps	(Gls)
1983–1994	Liaoning FC		

International career
1985–1992	China	15	(0)
Medal record
Men's football
Representing China
AFC Asian Cup
Bronze medal – third place	1992 Japan	Team
AFC Youth Championship
Silver medal – second place	1982 Bangkok	Team
- * Club domestic league appearances and goals

Fu Yubin (Chinese: 傅玉斌 born 9 August 1963) is a Chinese former football goalkeeper who spent his whole career for Liaoning FC where he won several Chinese league titles and the 1990 Asian Club Championship. In his international career he represented China in the 1992 Asian Cup where he aided them to a third-place finish.

== Biography ==
Fu Yubin started his career within the 1983 Chinese league season for Liaoning team and despite being relevantly short for a goalkeeper he eventually established himself within the team that went on to win the 1985 Chinese league season. This soon saw him called up to the Chinese national team where he was part of the squad that was unexpectedly knocked out by Hong-Kong in the 1986 FIFA World Cup qualification campaign. While he didn't actually play within the game the humbling experience spurred him on and he went on aid his club to be the most dominant team within the league as well helping the team win its first continental championship when they won the 1990 Asian Club Championship. He then went on to establish himself as China's first choice goalkeeper and aided them to a third-place finish after beating United Arab Emirates in a 4-3 penalty shootout. Fu retired by the end of the 1994 league season and moved away from football to join the Chinese entertainment business.

== Honours ==
- Asian Club Championship: 1990
- Chinese Jia-A League: 1985, 1987, 1988, 1990, 1991, 1992, 1993
- Chinese FA Cup: 1984, 1986
