= Gao Sheng (footballer) =

Chinese footballer and coach

Gao Sheng 高升
Personal information
- Full name: Gao Sheng
- Date of birth: 10 May 1962 (age 64)
- Place of birth: Shenyang, Liaoning, China
- Height: 1.83 m (6 ft 0 in)
- Position: Defensive midfielder

Youth career
- 1976–1983: Liaoning team

Senior career*
Years	Team	Apps	(Gls)
1983–1991	Liaoning team		
1991–1995	Fujitsu		

International career
1983–1990	China		(3)

Managerial career
- 1996–2001: Kawasaki Frontale Youth
- 2002: Liaoning Xingguang (assistant)
- 2003–2006: Liaoning Zhongyu (assistant)
- 2007–2011: Kawasaki Frontale Youth
- 2012–2013: Hangzhou Greentown (assistant)
- 2013–2014: Liaoning Whowin
- 2016–2017: Hangzhou Greentown (assistant)
- 2019–2020: Tianjin Tianhai (assistant)
- 2024: China U14
Medal record
Men's football
Representing China
University Games
Bronze medal – third place	1985 Kobe	Football
- * Club domestic league appearances and goals

Gao Sheng (simplified Chinese: 高升; traditional Chinese: 高昇; pinyin: Gāo Shēng; born 10 May 1962) is a Chinese football coach and former player who played as a defensive midfielder.

== Playing career ==
Born in Shenyang, Gao began his football career for his hometown football club Liaoning's youth team and later graduated to the senior team in 1983. He quickly made an impression within the team to win many trophies including 1989–90 Asian Club Championship. He accepted Shen Xiangfu's invitation and joined Japanese club Fujitsu in 1991. He retired at Fujitsu in 1995.

== Managerial career ==
Gao became a football coach of Fujitsu (later changed the club name as Kawasaki Frontale) youth team system after his retirement. He back to Liaoning in December 2011 when he joined Liaoning Xingguang, Liaoning's youth team, and served under his former teammate Tang Yaodong as an assistant coach. He was appointed as the assistant coach of Liaoning Zhongyu in January 2003 after Li Shubin was called up into China national team. He resigned from Liaoning in late 2006, and re-joined Kawasaki Frontale. He accepted the invitation of Takeshi Okada to become the assistant coach of Hangzhou Greentown in the Chinese Super League in 2012. He left the club after Okada's resign in November 2013. On 27 November 2013, he signed a three-year contract with another Super League club Liaoning Whowin and became their new manager. On 9 April 2014, he resigned from Liaoning after winning only once in the first five matches of the season.

== Personal life ==
Gao married to a Japanese woman in the 1990s. His son, Takahiro Ko (高 宇洋, Kō Takahiro), is currently playing for FC Tokyo.

== Career statistics ==
=== International goals ===
Scores and results list China's goal tally first, score column indicates score after each Gao goal.

List of international goals scored by Gao Sheng
No.	Date	Venue	Opponent	Score	Result	Competition
1	2 June 1988	Mizuho Athletic Stadium, Nagoya, Japan	Japan	2–0	3–0	1988 Kirin Cup
2	4 December 1988	Qatar SC Stadium, Doha, Qatar	Syria	1–0	3–0	1988 AFC Asian Cup
3	27 July 1990	Workers Stadium, Beijing, China	North Korea	1–0	2–0	1990 Dynasty Cup

== Honours ==
=== Player ===
Liaoning

- Chinese National League / Chinese Jia-A League (Top tier): 1985, 1987, 1988, 1990, 1991
- Chinese FA Cup: 1984, 1986
- Asian Club Championship: 1989–90
