= Guangdong Winnerway F.C. =

Chinese football club

- Full name: Guangdong Hongyuan Football Club
- Nickname: Southern Tigers
- Founded: 1958; 68 years ago (Semi-pro); 1992 (Professional)
- Dissolved: 2001; 25 years ago
- Ground: Guangzhou, China
- League: Chinese Jia-B League
- 2001: 10th
Home colours	Away colours

Guangdong Winnerway Football Club (simplified Chinese: 广东宏远; traditional Chinese: 廣東宏遠; pinyin: Guǎngdōng Hóngyuǎn) was a Chinese football club, established on September 15, 1992, by Guangdong Winnerway Group and Guangdong Football Association. It was one of the earliest professional football clubs in China.

== History ==
The club was originally formed in November 1958 when the local Guangdong government took control of the Guangzhou Sports University football team and participated in the 1959 National Games where they called themselves the Guangdong Provincial team. Zheng Deyao was appointed their head coach and guided them fifth within the tournament. After that competition the club entered the expanding Chinese national football league for the first time where they were allowed to be entered in the top tier in the 1960 season, finishing the campaign in fifth. The club also participated in the Chinese FA Cup for the first time where they came runners-up within that competition, losing 2–1 in the final to Tianjin. The following season Gong Boqiang came in as the new head coach, however he was unable to improve upon previous results. Su Yongshun came in as the club's new head coach in 1965, however his tenure saw the club finish bottom of the division. The club were unable to redeem themselves the following season when in 1966 football was halted within the country due to the cultural revolution. In 1969 Zhao Yong managed the side during the intervening years when there was no national league and the club took part in regional competitions.

When the league restarted in 1973 Guangdong were allowed entry back into the top tier and they brought in Su Yongshun as their head coach once more, however his second stint proved to be more fruitful after guiding the club to a fourth-place finish. In 1975 Guangdong participated in the 1975 National Games where they won the tournament. Su used the competition as a springboard to usher in young talented players such as Cai Jinbiao, Chen Xirong, Du Zhiren, Guan Zhirui, He Jia and Rong Zhixing into the squad before guiding them to the 1979 league title. After winning the club's first league title Su Yongshun was hired to be the Chinese national football team's head coach and this saw Xian Dixiong brought in as the club's manager. Xian Dixiong would have to contend with an aging squad, most notably the club's talisman Rong Zhixing who on February 27, 1983, was given China's first ever testimonial before retiring. The squad would really together and go on to win the South Championship in the 1983 season.

In 1984 Yue Yongrong was brought in to manage the team. Within his tenure the club would make significant changes towards restructuring the club. The team were one of the first in China to gain sponsorship with the Wanbao refrigerator factory and renamed themselves Guangdong Wanbao football club on January 2, 1985. The club used the money to restructure their youth academy resulting in the development of Xie Yuxin who the club would sell to FC Zwolle in the Netherlands and make the player the first Chinese person to transfer to another country. This restructuring would look like it was working as the club took part in and won the 1987 National games. Unfortunately this would not translate into the league and the club were relegated at the end of the 1990 league season. The club was able to immediately gain promotion back into the top tier. This saw the Guangdong Winnerway Group interested in the club, eventually going into a joint ownership with the Guangdong Football Association to re-establish the club as Guangdong Winnerway Football Club on September 15, 1992. With the Chinese Football Association establishing the 1994 Chinese Jia-A League as the first official fully professional league in Chinese history, the club took it upon themselves to be the leader within the transfer market when they bought Li Bing for 640,000 RMB making him at the time the most expensive player in Chinese footballer. Along with the signing of promising youngster Ma Mingyu there was high expectations that the club could win the league title, however under the management of Chen Yiming the club's highest position under his reign was fourth in the 1995 league season. Chen Yuliang was brought in to replace Chen Yiming, however his resignation saw the club slip further down the table and high-profile signing of Li Bing and Ma Mingyu left the club.

In the 1997 league season Guo Yijun was brought in to manage the squad, however under his tenure the club would struggle within the league. Su Yongshun was brought back into the team but results under him were unable to pull the team out of the relegation zone and the club finished bottom of the league. Despite the relegation in March 1998 the Guangdong Winnerway Group bought out the remaining shares from the Guangdong Football Association and became full owners of the club. The club would move to the untapped market of Shaoguan in the province of Guangdong and play their home games in Shaoguan City Xihe Sports Centre. Improved attendances and immediate promotion back into the top flight would not materialise at the end of the 1998 league season. The owners decided again to move cities in the 1999 league season, this time they chose Liuzhou and moved out of Guangdong Province for the first time. Once again attendances did not improve and they could not gain promotion. The club would move to Nanning and then Nanchang where the continued inability to win promotion along with low attendances saw the Guangdong Hongyuan Group decide that it was financially unsustainable to run a football club and sold their licence to Qingdao Hailifeng F.C. in December, 2001. After the disestablishment of the club the local Dongguan government in Guangdong took it upon themselves to create a Phoenix club called Dongguan Nancheng F.C.

== Naming changes ==
- 1958–1991: Guangdong Provincial team 广东队
- 1992–2001: Guangdong Winnerway 广东宏远 (home city: Guangzhou, Dongguan, Shaoguan, Liuzhou, Nanning, Guiyang)

== Managerial history ==
Semi-pro seasons:

- (China) Zheng Deyao 郑德耀 (1959–60)
- (China) Gong Bojiang 龚伯强 (1961–64)
- (China) Su Yongshun 苏永舜 (1965)
- (China) Zhao Yong 赵勇 (1969–72)
- (China) Su Yongshun 苏永舜 (1973–79)
- (China) Xian Dixiong 冼迪雄 (1980–83)
- (China) Yue Yongrong 岳永荣 (1984–1990)
- (China) Chen Xirong 陈熙荣 1990–1992
- (China) He Jinlun 何锦伦 (1993)

Professional seasons:

- (China) Chen Xirong 陈熙荣 (1994)
- (China) Chen Yiming 陈亦明 (1994–1995)
- (China) Chen Yuliang 陈玉良 (1995–1997)
- (China) Guo Yijun 郭亿军 (1997)
- (China) Su Yongshun 苏永舜 (1997)
- (China) Chen Yuliang 陈玉良 1998–2000
- (China) He Jinlun 何锦伦 (2001)

== Results ==
All-Time League rankings

Season	1960	1961	1962	1963	1964	1965	1973	1974	1976	1977	1978	1979	1980	1981	1982	1983	1984	1985	1986	1987	1988	1989	1990	1991	1992	1993
Division	1	1	1	1	1	1	1	1	1	1	1	1	1	1	1	1	1	1	1	1	1	1	1	2	1	1
Position	5	5^{1}	6	5	10	10	4	12	3^{1}	3	5	1	12	4	9	1^{2}	7	5	8	9	5	6	7	2	7	2

Season	1994	1995	1996	1997	1998	1999	2000	2001
Division	1	1	1	1	2	2	2	2
Position	7	4	9	12	5	3	7	10

no league game in 1959, 1966–1972, 1975;

- ^1 in group stage
- ^2 in South League

== Former players ==
1. Players that have played/managed in the Football League or any foreign equivalent to this level (i.e. fully professional league).
2. Players with full international caps.
3. Players that hold a club record or have captained the club.

- (China) Li Bing
- (China) Ma Mingyu
- (China) Ou Chuliang
- (China) Xie Yuxin
- (England) Craig Allardyce
- (England) Ian Docker
- (England) Murray Jones
- (England) Darren Tilley
- (England) Paul Raynor
- (England) Richard Crossley
- (France) Christophe Cocard
- (Brazil) Jose Carlos da Silva
