= Guan Zhirui =

Chinese footballer (born 1953)

Guan Zhirui 关至锐
Personal information
- Full name: Guan Zhirui
- Date of birth: April 12, 1953 (age 73)
- Place of birth: Guangzhou, Guangdong, China
- Position: Full-back

Youth career
- –1971: Zhanjiang

Senior career*
Years	Team	Apps	(Gls)
1972–1983	Guangdong		

International career
1974–1976	China		

Managerial career
- 2009: Guangdong Sunray Cave
Medal record
Men's football
Representing China
AFC Asian Cup
Bronze medal – third place	1976 Iran	Team
- * Club domestic league appearances and goals

Guan Zhirui
- Simplified Chinese: 关至锐
- Traditional Chinese: 关至锐
Transcriptions
Standard Mandarin
- Hanyu Pinyin: Guān zhìruì
- Wade–Giles: Guān^{1} zhì^{1}ruì^{2}

Guan Zhirui (Chinese: 关至锐; pinyin: Guān zhìruì; born April 12, 1953) is a retired Chinese football player and manager. He played as a full-back for Guangdong Hongyuan on a club level and was part of the club's first national title at the 1979 National Football League. He also represented his home country of China for the 1976 AFC Asian Cup, achieving third place in the country's Asian Cup debut.

== Club career ==
Guan was born in Guangzhou on April 12, 1953, though his family would move to Zhanjiang three years later after the first modern port was established there by the newly founded People's Republic of China as a part of a 14-year-long project. He also lived in Hong Kong for fourteen years. Football was strong in the port city as he played the sport for Zhanjiang Port Authority Primary School, Zhanjiang Amateur Sports School and the Zhanjiang No. 2 Middle School football team. His success in youth football would result in him representing Zhanjiang in the 1971 youth football tournament. He was then scouted by the coach of Guangdong play for the senior team as a full-back alongside Rong Zhixing, Du Zhiren and Chen Xirong. Guan played in the 1st Guangdong–Hong Kong Cup and played in a friendly against Inter Milan. He would also see the club earn considerable success as they would win the 1975 National Games of China as well as the 1979 National Football League as captain where the club won both championships before his retirement in 1983.

== International career ==
Guang was later selected to represent China for their international debut at the 1976 AFC Asian Cup, becoming the second footballer to hail from Zhanjiang following Chen Fulai with the club reaching an impressive third place. Prior to this, he had played for China in various friendlies across Africa against Chad, Zaire, Rwanda, Burundi, and Ethiopia in 1974.

== Managerial career ==
Guan would later become a trainer in both men's and women's football, notably training Chinese internationals such as Wei Haiying, Zhao Lihong, Ou Chuliang and others. He also coached the Guangdong women's football team. He also served as manager for Guangdong Sunray Cave for the 2009 China League One.
