= Guangdong Winnerway =

Guangdong Hongyuan may refer to:

- Guangdong Winnerway Group
- Guangdong Southern Tigers, the basketball club owned by Guangdong Winnerway Group
- Guangdong Winnerway F.C., the defunct football club owned by Guangdong Winnerway Group.
