= 1999 Guangzhou Apollo F.C. season =

Guangzhou Apollo F.C. 1999
- Manager: (China) Chen Xirong (to 4 May) (Japan) Tatsuyu Matsuki
- Stadium: Tianhe Stadium
- Jia-B League: 8th
- FA Cup: Second Round

The 1999 season is the 46th year in Guangzhou Football Club's existence, their 32nd season in the Chinese football league and the 6th season in the professional football league.
