= Chinese Football Association Player of the Year =

Annual sports award

Footballer of the Year is an annual award given by the Chinese Football Association to the best player of the year.

- 1994 — Li Bing
- 1995 — Fan Zhiyi
- 1996 — Fan Zhiyi
- 1997 — Jorge Campos
- 1998 — Hao Haidong
- 1999 — Qu Shengqing
- 2000 — Yang Chen
- 2001 — Li Tie
- 2002 — Zheng Zhi
- 2003 — Jörg Albertz
- 2004 — Zhao Junzhe
- 2005 — Branko Jelić
- 2006 — Zheng Zhi
- 2007 — Du Zhenyu
- 2008 — Emil Martínez
- 2009 — Jorge Samuel Caballero
- 2010 — Duvier Riascos
- 2011 — Muriqui
- 2012 — Cristian Dănălache
- 2013 — Darío Conca
- 2014 — Elkeson
- 2015 — Ricardo Goulart
- 2016 — Ricardo Goulart
- 2017 — Eran Zahavi
- 2018 — Wu Lei

Chinese Jia-A League goal ball is give to the best player in Chinese Jia-A League from 1994 to 2003.

- 1994 — Li Bing
- 1995 — Fan Zhiyi
- 1996 — Su Maozhen
- 1997 — Jorge Campos
- 1998 — Hao Haidong
- 1999 — Qu Shengqing
- 2000 — Zhang Enhua
- 2001 — Li Tie
- 2002 — Zheng Zhi
- 2003 — Jörg Albertz
