= China national football B team =

China B
- Association: Chinese Football Association
- Confederation: AFC (Asia)
- Sub-confederation: EAFF (East Asia)
- Head coach: Marcello Lippi
- Home stadium: N/A
First colours	Second colours

First international
- Italy U20 2–3 China B (Cerveteri, Italy; 17 June 1981)

The China national football B team is a secondary football team run occasionally as support for the China national football team.

== History ==
Before Joining FIFA, the Chinese national football team's main duty was to play friendlies with friendly countries. Sometimes a B team was created when the national team was occupied elsewhere. There was no obvious age or skill difference between the A and B teams. In 1957, the national white team was defeated by the national red team and lost the ticket to Melbourne. After the defeat, the national white team was regarded as the national B team before relegating to a regional team, the Tianjin Football Team. More B teams were created from time and time since. Coaches include Zhang Jingtian, Ha Zengguang, Fang Renqiu and Chen Fulai,

Chinese Football Association organised a China B team in 1981 with the name of China Hope in order to provide more international experiences for the young talents of the league. The team was dissolved in 1982 after a brawl with the Tunisia national football team. In 1984 another B team was established, coached by Zhang Jingtian. In 1986 a third national team, the national yellow team was created based on the championship team Liaoning FC.

The B team sometimes compete in the CFA leagues and won the league title in 1989 under the coaching of Xu Genbao. In the same year FIFA and IOC agreed to limit soccer players participating in the Olympics to be under 23, and the China B was rebranded as the China national under-23 football team.

On 2 May 2017, a new China B team was reorganised by China national football team manager Marcello Lippi.

== Coaching staff ==
Position	Name	Nationality
Head coach	Marcelo Lippi	Italy
Assistant coaches	Li Tie	China
Assistant coaches	Massimiliano Maddaloni	Italy
Assistant coaches	Narciso Pezzotti	Italy
Assistant coaches	Fabrizio Del Rosso	Italy
Goalkeeper coach	Michelangelo Rampulla	Italy
Fitness coach	Claudio Gaudino	Italy
Management	Massimo Neri	Italy
Tactics analyst	Silvano Cotti	Italy
Technical employee	Enrico Castellacci	Italy
Staff	Ricardo Gallego	Spain

== Players ==
=== Current squad ===
- The following 22 players were called up in the training camp as China national B football team. Before the training began, injured Xu Xin and Yang Xu were replaced by Liu Junshuai and Yang Liyu.
- Match date: 15 - 17 May 2017

No.	Pos.	Player	Date of birth (age)	Caps	Goals	Club
	GK	Shi Xiaotian	6 March 1990 (age 36)	0	0	(Chinese Football Association) Liaoning FC
	GK	Zou Dehai	27 February 1993 (age 33)	0	0	(Chinese Football Association) Hangzhou Greentown
	DF	Deng Hanwen	8 January 1995 (age 31)	0	0	(Chinese Football Association) Beijing Renhe
	DF	Gao Zhunyi	21 August 1995 (age 31)	0	0	(Chinese Football Association) Hebei China Fortune
	DF	Shi Ke	8 January 1993 (age 33)	0	0	(Chinese Football Association) Shanghai SIPG
	DF	He Guan	25 January 1993 (age 33)	0	0	(Chinese Football Association) Shanghai SIPG
	DF	Wang Shangyuan	2 June 1993 (age 33)	0	0	(Chinese Football Association) Guangzhou Evergrande
	DF	Fu Huan	12 July 1993 (age 33)	0	0	(Chinese Football Association) Shanghai SIPG
	DF	Liu Junshuai	10 January 1995 (age 31)	0	0	(Chinese Football Association) Shandong Luneng
	DF	Liu Yiming	28 February 1995 (age 31)	0	0	(Chinese Football Association) Tianjin Quanjian
	DF	Li Shuai	18 June 1995 (age 31)	0	0	(Chinese Football Association) Dalian Yifang
	DF	Yao Junsheng	29 October 1995 (age 31)	0	0	(Chinese Football Association) Meizhou Hakka
	MF	Liao Lisheng	29 April 1993 (age 33)	0	0	(Chinese Football Association) Guangzhou Evergrande
	MF	Liu Binbin	16 June 1993 (age 33)	0	0	(Chinese Football Association) Shandong Luneng
	MF	Chen Zhizhao	14 March 1988 (age 38)	0	0	(Chinese Football Association) Guangzhou R&F
	MF	Li Lei	30 May 1992 (age 34)	0	0	(Chinese Football Association) Beijing Guoan
	MF	Wu Xinghan	24 February 1993 (age 33)	0	0	(Chinese Football Association) Shandong Luneng
	MF	Tang Shi	24 January 1995 (age 31)	0	0	(Chinese Football Association) Beijing Guoan
	MF	He Chao	19 April 1995 (age 31)	0	0	(Chinese Football Association) Changchun Yatai
	FW	Xiao Zhi	28 May 1985 (age 41)	0	0	(Chinese Football Association) Guangzhou R&F
	FW	Wei Shihao	8 April 1995 (age 31)	0	0	(Chinese Football Association) Shanghai SIPG
	FW	Yang Liyu	13 February 1997 (age 29)	0	0	(Chinese Football Association) Tianjin Teda

=== Recent call-ups ===
The following players have been called up within the last twelve months.

Pos.	Player	Date of birth (age)	Caps	Goals	Club	Latest call-up
