= Li Bing (footballer) =

Chinese footballer and manager

Li Bing 黎兵
Personal information
- Date of birth: March 16, 1969 (age 57)
- Place of birth: Guiyang, Guizhou, China
- Height: 1.86 m (6 ft 1 in)
- Position: Forward

Youth career
- 1988–1991: China B

Senior career*
Years	Team	Apps	(Gls)
1990–1993	Liaoning FC	?	(?)
1994	Liaoning Yuandong	21	(10)
1995–1996	Guangdong Winnerway	42	(14)
1997–2002	Sichuan Quanxing	94	(36)
2000	→ Kickers Offenbach (loan)	6	(0)

International career
1988–1992	China U23		
1992–2001	China	67	(19)

Managerial career
- 2002–2003: Zhejiang Greentown (trainer)
- 2003: Zhejiang Greentown (caretaker)
- 2007–2009: Chengdu Blades
- 2010–2011: China U23 (assistant)
- 2012–2013: China U20 (assistant)
- 2013–2014: China U20
- 2013: Guangzhou R&F (caretaker)
- 2015: Guangzhou R&F (caretaker)
- 2016–2017: Guizhou Zhicheng (caretaker)
- 2017–2019: Sichuan Longfor
- 2023–2025: Guangdong GZ-Power
Medal record
Men's football
Representing China
AFC Asian Cup
Bronze medal – third place	1992 Japan	Team
Asian Games
Silver medal – second place	1994 Hiroshima	Football
- * Club domestic league appearances and goals

Li Bing (Chinese: 黎兵; pinyin: Lí Bīng; Mandarin pronunciation: [lǐ píŋ]; born 16 March 1969 in Guizhou) is a retired Chinese international football player and currently a football coach.

In his playing career he represented Liaoning FC, Guangdong Winnerway, Sichuan Quanxing and a short loan period with German side Kickers Offenbach. Internationally Li represented China within the 1992 and 1996 AFC Asian Cup before he retired and moved into coaching where he received his first head coach position with Chengdu Blades.

== Club career ==
As a youngster, Li was quickly picked up by the Chinese U23 and with them, he was allowed to take part in the Chinese football league pyramid where they called themselves China B. He would actually see them win the Chinese league title in the 1989 league season before he had to return to his parent club Liaoning. Upon his return to Liaoning it would coincide with full professionalism and this would seem to bring out the best from him when he went on to personally win the 1994 Chinese Football Association Footballer of the Year award. This would see him as one of the most sought after players within China and big-money move to top tier side Guangdong Winnerway where he was brought in to help with them with their title push, however, while they were close they only finished 4th in the 1995 league season. Unable to improve upon their performances the following season when they finished a disappointing 7th, Li Bing would be sold to Sichuan Quanxing. With them he was able to find a team capable of consistently fighting for the league title, however, the best they were able to achieve was 3rd position in the 1999 league season.

== Management career ==
Li Bing would guide Chengdu Blades to promotion to the Chinese Super League after coming in during the 2007 league season, where he guided them to second in the league in the second tier. While he led Chengdu to relative safety throughout the 2008 league season, he led them to a terrible start in 2009 and resigned only six games into the season. He also became the caretaking manager of Guangzhou R&F twice.

== Career statistics ==
=== International ===
Appearances and goals by national team and year
National team	Year	Apps	Goals
China	1992	6	1
China	1993	12	2
China	1994	7	3
China	1995	3	1
China	1996	13	5
China	1997	16	3
China	1998	5	5
China	2000	3	0
China	2001	4	1
Total		69	21

Scores and results list China's goal tally first, score column indicates score after each Bing goal.

List of international goals scored by Li Bing
No.	Date	Venue	Opponent	Score	Result	Competition	Ref.
1	29 October 1992	Hiroshima Big Arch, Hiroshima, Japan	Saudi Arabia	1-1	1-1	1992 AFC Asian Cup	
2	16 June 1993	Chengdu Sports Centre, Chengdu, China	Jordan	1-0	4-1	1994 FIFA World Cup qualification	
3	16 June 1993	Chengdu Sports Centre, Chengdu, China	Jordan	3-1	4-1	1994 FIFA World Cup qualification	
4	3 October 1994	Coca-Cola West Hiroshima Stadium, Hiroshima, Japan	Yemen	2-0	4-0	1994 Asian Games	
5	13 October 1994	Coca-Cola West Hiroshima Stadium, Hiroshima, Japan	Kuwait	1-0	2-0	1994 Asian Games	
6	16 October 1994	Coca-Cola West Hiroshima Stadium, Hiroshima, Japan	Uzbekistan	2-3	2-4	1994 Asian Games	
7	26 October 1995	Workers' Stadium, Beijing, China	Colombia	2-0	2-1	Friendly	
8	30 January 1996	Mong Kok Stadium, Kowloon, Hong Kong	Macau	4-1	7-1	1996 AFC Asian Cup qualification	
9	30 January 1996	Mong Kok Stadium, Kowloon, Hong Kong	Macau	5-1	7-1	1996 AFC Asian Cup qualification	
10	30 January 1996	Mong Kok Stadium, Kowloon, Hong Kong	Macau	7-1	7-1	1996 AFC Asian Cup qualification	
11	26 November 1996	Tianhe Stadium, Guangzhou, China	South Korea	2-3	2-3	Friendly	
12	9 December 1996	Tahnoun bin Mohammed Stadium, Al Ain, UAE	Syria	3-0	3-0	1996 AFC Asian Cup	
13	4 May 1997	Nusaý Stadium, Ashgabat, Turkmenistan	Turkmenistan	4-0	4-1	1998 FIFA World Cup qualification	
14	25 May 1997	Thống Nhất Stadium, Ho Chi Minh City, Vietnam	Vietnam	1-0	3-1	1998 FIFA World Cup qualification	
15	2 September 1997	Jinzhou Stadium, Dalian, China	Kazakhstan	3-0	3-0	Friendly	
16	4 March 1998	Nissan Stadium, Yokohama, Japan	South Korea	1-0	1-2	Friendly	
17	7 March 1998	Japan National Stadium, Tokyo, Japan	Japan	1-0	2-0	Friendly	
18	7 March 1998	Japan National Stadium, Tokyo, Japan	Japan	2-0	2-0	Friendly	
19	27 June 1998	Rajamangala Stadium, Bangkok, Thailand	Thailand	2-0	3-0	Friendly	
20	8 July 1998	Shanghai, China	Uzbekistan	—	3-1	Friendly	
21	20 May 2001	Tianhe Stadium, Guangzhou, China	Cambodia	3-1	3-1	2002 FIFA World Cup qualification	

== Honours ==
=== Player ===
China B

- Chinese Jia-A League: 1989
