= Gao Sheng =

Gao Sheng may refer to:

- Gao Sheng (rebel), a character in the Three Kingdoms
- Gao Sheng (footballer) (born 1962), Chinese former footballer and current manager
