= Zang Haili =

Chinese footballer and coach

Zang Haili 臧海利
Personal information
- Date of birth: 19 December 1978 (age 47)
- Place of birth: Changchun, Jilin, China
- Height: 1.78 m (5 ft 10 in)
- Position: Defender

Team information
- Current team: China U20 (assistant coach)

Youth career
- 1995–1996: Bayi Football Team

Senior career*
Years	Team	Apps	(Gls)
1997–2003	Bayi Football Team	72	(1)
2004–2011	Liaoning FC	135	(2)

Managerial career
- 2014–2019: Liaoning FC (assistant)
- 2019–2020: Liaoning FC
- 2021: Xiamen Egret Island
- 2022: Heilongjiang Ice City
- 2026–: China U20 (assistant)
- * Club domestic league appearances and goals as of Feb 2016 ‡ National team caps and goals as of Feb 2016

Zang Haili (Chinese: 臧海利; pinyin: Zāng Hǎilì; born 19 December 1978) is a Chinese assistant football coach and a former professional player.

== Club career ==
Zang Haili was born in Changchun, Jilin. He graduated through the youth system of Bayi Football Team and would break into the senior team during the 1997 league season. While he was establishing himself within the team, he saw them relegated at the end of the 1998 league season, however he stayed with the team to aid them in their promotion at the end of the 2000 league season back to the top tier. He continued to be a vital member for Bayi until they disbanded at the end of the 2003 league season. Without a club he would join Liaoning FC where he immediately made himself a regular within their defence for the next several seasons, however at the end of the 2008 league season he was unable to help them fight off relegation. While Zang Haili was tempted to return to his hometown and join Changchun Yatai F.C. he decided to stay with the club and help the team to win the second tier title.

== Club career stats ==
Season	Team	Country	Division	Apps	Goals
1997	Bayi Football Team	China	1	0	0
1998	Bayi Football Team	China	1	19	0
1999	Bayi Football Team	China	2	?	?
2000	Bayi Football Team	China	2	?	?
2001	Bayi Football Team	China	1	25	0
2002	Bayi Football Team	China	1	11	1
2003	Bayi Football Team	China	1	17	0
2004	Liaoning FC	China	1	20	2
2005	Liaoning FC	China	1	24	0
2006	Liaoning FC	China	1	14	0
2007	Liaoning FC	China	1	20	0
2008	Liaoning FC	China	1	27	0
2009	Liaoning FC	China	2	18	0
2010	Liaoning FC	China	1	11	0
2011	Liaoning FC	China	1	1	0

== Honours ==
Liaoning FC

- China League One: 2009
