= Su Yongshun =

Chinese football manager

Personal information
- Date of birth: 1934 (age 91–92)
- Place of birth: China
- Position: Midfielder

Managerial career
- Years: Team
- 1965: Guangdong
- 1973–1979: Guangdong
- 1980–1982: China
- 1996: Liaoning F.C.

Su Yongshun (Chinese: 苏永舜; born 1934 in China) is a Chinese retired football manager.

== Career ==
As a player, Su's team qualified for the University Games held in the Soviet Union, but China decided not to send a team for fear of humiliation, with a Chinese selection losing 1-19 to foreign opposition earlier that year.

In 1980, he was appointed head coach of the China national selection, beating North Korea, Japan, Singapore, Kuwait, and Saudi Arabia in the midst of qualifying for the 1982 World Cup. However, they lost to New Zealand in the play-off final. Afterwards, Su publicized everything in a newspaper, detailing his tactics, selection process, players, and reasons for failure. He also decided to resign because he felt that he should give another domestic coach a chance. That year, he immigrated to Canada, in order to care for his mother who had cancer. His father also had cancer, but he was unable to leave at the time. Since then, he has been living in Canada, only returning to China to manage Liaoning in 1996.
