= Fushun Leifeng Stadium =

Sports venue in Fushun, China

Coordinates: 41°51′53″N 123°51′50″E

Fushun Leifeng Stadium (Simplified Chinese: 雷峰体育场) is a multi-purpose stadium in Shuncheng District, Fushun, Liaoning Province, China. It is currently used mostly for football matches and is the home ground of Liaoning FC of the China PR Super League. The stadium holds 32,000.
