= 1956 Chinese National Olympic Football Trial =

The 1956 Chinese National Olympic Football Trial was a tournament held by the Chinese National Sport Committee to select the football representatives for the 1956 Summer Olympics. The United Red Team defeated United White Team in the final match and won the ticket to Melbourne.

The National Team was split into the United Red and White teams, with members mostly made of the Chinese Youth Team returning from studying in Hungary. The National Sport Committee also invited Hong Kong, Macau and Taiwan to join Olympic trials, the invitation was denied by Taiwan, and Macau did not send a football team.

In the opening match, Shanghai defeated Hong Kong with a 6-1 score. Hong Kong withdrew from the tournament next day and lost to Bayi with 0-7 in a friendly. Shanghai then lost to both the United Red and United White teams with the same 1-2 score. In the final match, United Red defeated United White 2-1.

After the tournament, the United Red team was kept in Beijing and became the Beijing Football Team. The United White team was disbanded as a result. As the players were professional players, the team was led to Tianjian to found the Tianjian Football Team.
