= 2001 Chinese Jia-A League =

Chinese Jia-A League
- Season: 2001
- Champions: Dalian Shide (6th title)
- Relegated: None
- AFC Champions League: Dalian Shide; Shanghai Shenhua
- Matches: 182
- Goals: 474 (2.6 per match)
- Top goalscorer: Hao Haidong (16 goals)
- Average attendance: 18,296

The 2001 Chinese Jia-A League season was the eighth season of professional association football and the 40th top-tier overall league season in China. The league started on March 11 and ended on December 16, with Dalian Shide retaining the championship.

== Promotion and relegation ==
Teams promoted from 2000 Jia-B League

- Shaanxi Guoli
- August 1st

Teams relegated after end of 2000 Jia-A League

- Xiamen Xiaxin
- Jilin Aodong

== Overview ==
The season would see Dalian Shide continue their dominance within the league and saw them win their sixth league title. On the other end of the table Shenyang Ginde would gain the fewest points in Chinese league history, although because it was an expansion season they avoided relegation. Also the Asian Club Championship was rebranded as the AFC Champions League and would now allow two Chinese teams to enter the competition.

== Personnel ==
Team	Manager
August 1st	
Beijing Guoan	(China) Wei Kexing
Chongqing Lifan	(South Korea) Lee Jang-soo
Dalian Shide	(Federal Republic of Yugoslavia) Milorad Kosanović
Liaoning Fushun	(China) Wang Hongli
Qingdao Beer	(China) Guo Zuojin
Shaanxi Guoli	
Shandong Luneng	(Russia) Boris Ignatyev
Shanghai Shenhua	(Federal Republic of Yugoslavia) Ilija Petković
Shenyang Ginde	(France) Alain Laurier
Shenzhen Kejian Ping'an	(China) Zhu Guanghu
Sichuan Shangwutong	(England) Bob Houghton
Tianjin TEDA	(Uruguay) Nelson Agresta
Yunnan Hongta	(China) Qi Wusheng

== Foreign players ==
As a military-owned team, August 1st were not allowed to sign any foreign players. From this season onwards, clubs are not allowed to sign foreign goalkeepers anymore.

Club	Player 1	Player 2	Player 3	Player 4	Former players
Beijing Guoan	(Bulgaria) Milen Georgiev	(Colombia) Diego Toro	(Federal Republic of Yugoslavia) Miroslav Čermelj	(Sweden) Jonny Rödlund	
Chongqing Lifan	(Croatia) Dean Računica	(Democratic Republic of the Congo) Zola Kiniambi	(Italy) Arnold Schwellensattl	(Vietnam) Lê Huỳnh Đức	(Liberia) Jonathan Sogbie
Dalian Shide	(Brazil) Adilson	(Brazil) Nando	(Federal Republic of Yugoslavia) Srđan Bajčetić	(Federal Republic of Yugoslavia) Zoran Rajović	
Liaoning Fushun	(Netherlands) Dave Kastelein				
Qingdao Beer	(Argentina) Claudio Arturi	(Federal Republic of Yugoslavia) Dejan Sarić			(Brazil) Edson Paulista
Shaanxi Guoli	(Brazil) Alex	(Brazil) Lula	(Brazil) Marcão	(Brazil) Renato Ribas	(Brazil) Douglas
Shandong Luneng	(Brazil) Márcio Santos	(Chile) Gabriel Mendoza	(Ghana) Nii Lamptey	(Ukraine) Serhiy Nahornyak	(Paraguay) Casiano Delvalle (Uruguay) José Herrera
Shanghai Shenhua	(Bosnia and Herzegovina) Saša Raca	(Federal Republic of Yugoslavia) Dragan Tomić	(Federal Republic of Yugoslavia) Neško Milovanović	(Federal Republic of Yugoslavia) Zoran Ranković	(Colombia) Víctor Hugo Mafla
Shenyang Ginde	(Cameroon) Georges Mouyémé	(Czech Republic) Robert Caha	(Poland) Marek Jóźwiak	(Poland) Rafał Pawlak	(Cameroon) Tobie Mimboe
Shenzhen Kejian Ping'an	(Brazil) Tiago	(Federal Republic of Yugoslavia) Denis Prtenjača	(Morocco) Abdeljalil El Hajji	(Namibia) Eliphas Shivute	
Sichuan Shangwutong	(Brazil) Marcelo Marmelo	(Croatia) Dragan Vukoja	(Croatia) Miroslav Bičanić		
Tianjin TEDA	(Brazil) Emerson	(Brazil) Milson	(Uruguay) Claudio Elías	(Uruguay) Marcelo de Souza	(Argentina) Claudio Arturi (Uruguay) Alejandro Larrea
Yunnan Hongta	(Chile) Luis Musrri	(Romania) Marian Savu	(Romania) Viorel Domocoș	(Russia) Sergei Kiriakov	(Cameroon) Bertin Tomou (Romania) Constantin Munteanu

== League standings ==
Pos	Team	Pld	W	D	L	GF	GA	GD	Pts	Qualification
1	Dalian Shide	26	16	5	5	58	31	+27	53	2002–03 AFC Champions League qualification
2	Shanghai Shenhua	26	15	3	8	39	28	+11	48	2002–03 AFC Champions League qualification
3	Liaoning Fushun	26	15	3	8	39	32	+7	48	
4	Sichuan Shangwutong	26	14	5	7	36	29	+7	47	
5	Shenzhen Kejian Ping'an	26	13	7	6	34	18	+16	46	
6	Shandong Luneng	26	13	6	7	42	32	+10	45	
7	Tianjin TEDA	26	10	6	10	38	31	+7	36	
8	Beijing Guoan	26	9	6	11	30	33	−3	33	
9	Shaanxi Guoli	26	8	8	10	31	41	−10	32	
10	Yunnan Hongta	26	8	7	11	34	32	+2	31	
11	Chongqing Lifan	26	7	10	9	24	27	−3	31	
12	August 1st	26	5	10	11	24	36	−12	25	
13	Qingdao Beer	26	5	7	14	22	35	−13	22	
14	Shenyang Ginde	26	2	1	23	23	69	−46	7	

Source: rsssf.com

== See also ==
- Chinese Jia-A League
- Chinese Super League
- Chinese Football Association Jia League
- Chinese Football Association Yi League
- Chinese FA Cup
- Chinese Football Association
- Football in China
- List of football records in China
- Chinese clubs in the AFC Champions League
