= Guangzhou City F.C. =

Chinese association football club

Guangzhou City 广州城
- Full name: Guangzhou City Football Club 广州城足球俱乐部
- Nickname: The Blue Lions
- Short name: GZ City
- Founded: 2011; 15 years ago
- Dissolved: 29 March 2023; 3 years ago
- Ground: Yuexiushan Stadium
- Capacity: 18,000
Home colours	Away colours

Guangzhou City F.C.
- Traditional Chinese: 廣州城
- Simplified Chinese: 广州城
Transcriptions
Standard Mandarin
- Hanyu Pinyin: Guǎngzhōu Chéng
Yue: Cantonese
- Jyutping: gwong2 zau1 sing4

Guangzhou City Football Club (simplified Chinese: 广州城; traditional Chinese: 廣州城) was a Chinese professional football club which last competed in the Chinese Super League. The team was based in Guangzhou, Guangdong. The club's name between 2011 and 2020 was Guangzhou R&F, which was short for rich (富) and force (力). The club changed its name to Guangzhou City in December 2020.

The club was founded in 2011 in Guangzhou. They played at the 55,000-seat Wulihe Stadium, until they moved to Changsha, Hunan in 2007 to reside at the Helong Stadium. American sportswear and sports equipment company MAZAMBA took over the club in 2010, and relocated the club to Shenzhen, Guangdong in February 2011. Their ownership was brief, and by June 2011 Chinese property developers Guangzhou R&F gained ownership of the club and moved them to Guangzhou. The club had their most successful season in 2014 as they finished third in the league and qualified for the 2015 AFC Champions League. Guangzhou City was dissolved in March 2023.

== History ==
=== History before moving to Guangzhou ===
The club was founded in 1986 by the local Shenyang government sports body to take part in the Chinese football league system, and was named Shenyang. The team started at the bottom of the league system by playing in the second division. They were promoted to the 1988 Chinese Jia-A League quickly after the league expanded and Liaoning FC was ineligible to field their reserve team in the same division. The club was relegated after only one season. With the following campaigns the club mostly remained within the second tier, except for a short foray in the 1992 Chinese Jia-A League campaign; however, they were again relegated after only one season.

By the 1994 league season, the entire Chinese football league system had become professional. The team were allowed to gather sponsorship and renamed as Shenyang Liuyao, and were allowed to join the top tier due to their 1992 membership. When the club were relegated again at the end of the season, it was renamed Shenyang Huayang and then Shenyang Sealion in 1996. The club again won promotion to the top tier; however, this time they were able to avoid relegation. This was to be the beginning of the club's establishment within the league, though the team benefitted from several seasons where there was no relegation while the league expanded. In 2001, the club was taken over by Ginde Plastic Pipe Industry Group, a subsidiary of the Hongyuan Group and changed its name to Shenyang Ginde. In 2007, the club's homeground Wulihe Stadium was demolished. While the club was expected to move to another stadium within Shenyang, specifically the Shenyang Olympic Sports Center Stadium, the deal fell through and the club instead moved to Changsha, Hunan and changed its name to Changsha Ginde.

After Changsha Ginde were relegated to League One at the end of the 2010 season, the club was purchased by Mazamba and moved into the Shenzhen Stadium in the city of Shenzhen, Guangdong in February 2011. To represent this change, the owners changed the club's name to Shenzhen Phoenix, and also changed the home kit from sky blue to green. By May 2011, the club was exposed as having serious financial problems and were struggling to pay their players and their hotel accommodation.

=== History in Guangzhou ===
In serious doubt of completing the 2011 season, Shenzhen Phoenix was put up for sale. The club was bought by Chinese property developers Guangzhou R&F who moved the club to the Yuexiushan Stadium in Guangzhou and changed the club's colours back to blue. Under the new ownership results significantly improved and the club gained promotion back into the top tier at the end of the 2011 China League One season. The team finished the league in seventh, and the club's owners decided to commit their long-term future to the club by establishing a football school in Meizhou. The start of the 2013 Chinese Super League season, however, the club struggled in the league and the manager Sérgio Farias was fired. Former England manager Sven-Göran Eriksson was appointed to replace him on June 4, 2013, and given a 19-month contract. Eriksson's first full season would see the club finish third, its highest league finish, and qualify for the Asian Champions League for the first time. Moroccan striker Abderazzak Hamdallah was a key player for the team, scoring 22 times in 22 appearances. However, manager Eriksson left at the end of his contract and moved to Shanghai SIPG who had finished fifth that year.

On 2 January 2015, the club announced that Cosmin Contra would be their new manager. Contra coached the club in their maiden appearance in the Asian Champions League, coming through the preliminary stages against Warriors FC and Central Coast Mariners to earn a place in the group stage. However, despite an away victory over Gamba Osaka, Guangzhou R&F were eliminated at the group stage. The club's league form was also poor and Contra was sacked on July 22. Li Bing was installed as caretaker manager. There were more changes as Korean defensive midfielder Park Jong-woo and the injured and unsettled Hamdallah also left the club mid-season. Hamdallah only scored three goals in 2015, making him the club's all-time leading foreign scorer at the time with 25, one ahead of Yakubu. The disruption continued as R&F were forced to play some of their home matches at Guangzhou's University City Stadium whilst Yuexiushan was being refurbished, just as in 2012.

==== The Dragan Stojković era ====
Guangzhou R&F announced Dragan Stojković as their new manager on 24 August 2015 and handed the former Yugoslav international a contract until the end of the 2017 season. Stojković preserved R&F's top flight status as they finished 14th out of 16 teams in 2015.

In July 2016, R&F signed Israeli international Eran Zahavi from Maccabi Tel Aviv. Whilst home stadium Yuexiushan was being refurbished, R&F played their opening home games in 2017 at the Guangdong Provincial People's Stadium. Stojković's attacking style of play and Zahavi's goals led R&F to finish fifth in the CSL in 2017. There was double disappointment on the final day of the season however, as the club fell just short of qualifying for the Champions League and Zahavi missed out on breaking the single season CSL scoring record by just one goal. However, his 27 goals earned him the 2017 golden boot. Guangzhou R&F reached the semi-finals of the CFA Cup in 2018, but had a disappointing CSL campaign as they finished 10th.

Guangzhou R&F finished 12th in the CSL in 2019. In attack, Zahavi's 29 goals set a new single season scoring record, but the team had the worst defensive record in the league, conceding 72 goals in 30 games. After spending over four seasons at the club - making him Guangzhou R&F's longest ever serving manager - Stojković left the club in January 2020.

Giovanni van Bronckhorst was announced as Guangzhou R&F's new manager on 4 January 2020. The CSL's format was disrupted because of the COVID-19 pandemic, and van Bronckhorst led the team to an 11th-place finish. After a CFA Cup quarter-final loss on penalties, the club announced on 3 December 2020 that van Bronckhorst had resigned as manager for personal reasons.

In accordance with the new national rules on removing sponsors from club names, the club was renamed Guangzhou City in December 2020.

== Name history ==
- 1986–1993: Shenyang (沈阳)
- 1994: Shenyang Liuyao (沈阳东北六药)
- 1995: Shenyang Huayang (沈阳华阳)
- 1996–2001: Shenyang Sealion (沈阳海狮)
- 2001–2006: Shenyang Ginde (沈阳金德)
- 2007–2010: Changsha Ginde (长沙金德)
- 2011: Shenzhen Phoenix (深圳凤凰)
- 2011–2020: Guangzhou R&F (广州富力)
- 2020–2023: Guangzhou City (广州城)

== Rivalries ==
The club took part in the Liaoning Derby, a regional fixture contested against Dalian Football Club and Liaoning FC while the club was located in Shenyang. The tie against Liaoning FC was the more intimate affair because the clubs shared the Shenyang People's Stadium in the 1994 league season compared to the Dalian fixture, which historically saw few meaningful clashes. At the end of the 2006 league season the club left this derby when they moved out of Shenyang.

When the club moved to, Guangzhou they soon formed a rivalry with Guangzhou Evergrande, which is often referred to as the Canton derby. The first derby was played at Yuexiushan Stadium in a league match on March 16, 2012, and Guangzhou R&F won 2–0 at home against the reigning league champions. The venue was significant because it had been Guangzhou Evergrande's home ground. However, the two club owners, Zhang Li and Xu Jiayin, did not view the derby with hostility and on the return fixture, which R&F won 1–0, they were seen enjoying a meal together instead of watching the game.

== Managerial history ==
As of 7 December 2022

- (Ukraine) Serhiy Morozov (1994)
- (China) Zhang Zengqun (1995)
- (China) Li Yingfa (1996)
- (China) Li Qiang (1996–98)
- (Brazil) Ademar Braga (1999)
- (China) Li Qiang (1999)
- (Russia) Valery Nepomnyashchy (2000)
- (Poland) Henryk Kasperczak (2000–01)
- (France) Alain Laurier (2001)
- (Portugal) Toni (July 1, 2002 – Dec 31, 2002)
- (Serbia and Montenegro) Dragoslav Stepanović (June 26, 2003 – Dec 31, 2003)
- (England) Bob Houghton (Nov 25, 2005 – June 9, 2006)
- (Netherlands) Martin Koopman (2006)
- (Serbia) Milan Živadinović (2007)
- (Serbia) Slobodan Santrač (Jan 1, 2008 – June 30, 2008)
- (China) Zhu Bo (July 21, 2008 – Oct 12, 2009)
- (China) Hao Wei (Oct 12, 2009 – June 21, 2010)
- (Serbia) Miodrag Ješić (June 21, 2010 – 2010)
- (China) Li Shubin (Feb 27, 2011 – Nov 22, 2011)
- (Brazil) Sérgio Farias (Nov 22, 2011 – May 18, 2013)
- (China) Li Bing (Caretaker) (May 19, 2013 – June 3, 2013)
- (Sweden) Sven-Göran Eriksson (June 4, 2013 – November 10, 2014)
- (Romania) Cosmin Contra (Jan 4, 2015 – July 22, 2015)
- (China) Li Bing (Caretaker) (July 22, 2015 – Aug 24, 2015)
- (Serbia) Dragan Stojković a.k.a. Piksi (Aug 24, 2015 – Jan 3, 2020)
- (Netherlands) Giovanni van Bronckhorst (Jan 4, 2020 – Dec 3, 2020)
- (Netherlands) Jean-Paul van Gastel (Jan 31, 2021 – July 24, 2022)
- (China) Zhao Junzhe (Caretaker) (July 24, 2022 – Aug 29, 2022)
- (China) Li Weifeng (Aug 29, 2022 – Mar 29, 2023)

== Honours ==
=== League ===
- Jia B Champions/China League One
  - Runners-up (2): 1991, 2011

== Professional club records ==
For Guangzhou R&F in league football as of the end of the 2018 season

=== Team records ===
- Record home victory: 6–2 v Hangzhou Greentown (2014), 6–2 v Yanbian Funde (2017)
- Record away victory: 5–1 v Liaoning Whowin FC (2014)
- Record home defeat: 2–6 v Tianjin Quanjian (2018)
- Record away defeat: 0–6 v Beijing Guoan (2013)
- Most cleansheets: 9 (2014)
- Fewest cleansheets: 5 (2012, 2017, 2018)

=== Player records ===
- Top domestic goalscorer: 20, Xiao Zhi
- Top foreign goalscorer: 87, Eran Zahavi
- Youngest domestic goalscorer: 20 years old (2018) Ma Junliang
- Youngest foreign goalscorer: 19 years old (2014) Aaron Samuel Olanare
- Most goals in a season: 29 (2019) Eran Zahavi
- Fastest hat-trick: 10 minutes (2014) Abderazzak Hamdallah
- Most appearances by a goalkeeper: 168, Cheng Yuelei
- Most appearances by an outfield player: 200, Tang Miao
- Oldest player: 35 years, 6 months, 23 days, Zhang Yaokun

== Results ==
=== All-time League rankings ===
As of the end of 2022 season.

Year	Div	Pld	W	D	L	GF	GA	GD	Pts	Pos.	FA Cup	Super Cup	League Cup	AFC	Att./G	Stadium
1986	2	7								4^{1}	DNQ	–	–			
1987	3	7								3^{1}^{2}	NH	–	–			
1988	1	20	4	7	9	17	17	0	19	17	NH	–	–			
1989	2	22	5	12	5	20	18	1	27	9	NH	–	–			
1990	2	22	6	10	6	19	16	3	28	7	DNQ	–	–			
1991	2	18	8	7	3	23	18	5	19^{1}	RU	QF	–	–			
1992	1	14	1	1	12	8	36	−28	3	8^{3}	R1	–	–			
1993	2	5	1	0/1	3	5	9	−4	2	5^{1}	NH	–	–			
1994	1	22	1	9	12	16	39	−23	11	11	NH	–	–		5,591	Shenyang People's Stadium
1995	2	22	6	8	8	22	28	−6	26	8	R1	DNQ	–			Shenyang People's Stadium
1996	2	22	6	8	8	24	23	1	26	7	R1	DNQ	–			Shenyang People's Stadium
1997	2	22	9	8	5	37	28	9	35	3	R1	DNQ	–			Shenyang People's Stadium
1998	1	26	7	10	9	19	28	−9	31	10	R2	DNQ	–		15,077	Shenyang People's Stadium
1999	1	26	5	13	8	28	32	−4	28	11	R1	DNQ	–		11,923	Shenyang People's Stadium
2000	1	26	8	10	8	35	32	3	34	7	QF	DNQ	–		35,615	Wulihe Stadium
2001	1	26	2	1	23	23	69	−46	7	14^{4}	R2	DNQ	–		12,000	Wulihe Stadium
2002	1	28	8	10	10	34	34	0	34	11	R1	DNQ	–		14,500	Wulihe Stadium
2003	1	28	11	10	7	35	31	4	43	5	SF	DNQ	–		18,857	Wulihe Stadium
2004	1	22	7	5	10	23	29	−6	26	8	R4	NH	R1		5,000	Wulihe Stadium
2005	1	26	4	7	15	19	43	−24	19	13^{4}	R1	NH	R1		2,077	Wulihe Stadium
2006	1	28	6	8	14	22	43	−21	26	13	R2	NH	NH		2,750	Wulihe Stadium
2007	1	28	8	10	10	17	24	−7	34	10	NH	NH	NH		10,571	Helong Stadium
2008	1	30	7	13	10	28	36	−8	34	11	NH	NH	NH		6,645	Helong Stadium
2009	1	30	6	15	9	23	31	−8	33	14	NH	NH	NH		8,498	Helong Stadium
2010	1	30	6	12	12	24	42	−18	30	16	NH	NH	NH		10,152	Helong Stadium
2011	2	26	13	8	5	36	27	9	47	RU	R2	NH	NH			Dongguan Nancheng Stadium; Yuexiushan Stadium
2012	1	30	13	3	14	47	49	−2	42	7	R4	DNQ	NH		8,460	Yuexiushan Stadium; Guangzhou HEMC Central Stadium
2013	1	30	11	7	12	45	47	−2	40	6	R4	DNQ	NH		10,384	Yuexiushan Stadium
2014	1	30	17	6	7	67	39	28	57	3	R4	DNQ	NH		11,487	Yuexiushan Stadium
2015	1	30	8	7	15	35	41	−6	31	14	R4	DNQ	NH	Group	7,989	Yuexiushan Stadium; Guangzhou HEMC Central Stadium
2016	1	30	11	7	12	47	50	−3	40	6	SF	DNQ	NH		9,831	Yuexiushan Stadium
2017	1	30	15	7	8	59	46	13	52	5	QF	DNQ	NH		9,904	Yuexiushan Stadium; Guangdong Provincial People's Stadium
2018	1	30	10	6	14	49	61	−12	36	10	SF	DNQ	NH		10,321	Yuexiushan Stadium
2019	1	30	9	5	16	54	72	-18	32	12	R4	DNQ	NH			Yuexiushan Stadium
2020	1	14	4	3	7	14	28	−14	15	11	QF	DNQ	NH			Yuexiushan Stadium
2021	1	22	7	8	7	32	31	1	29	7	R4	DNQ	NH			Yuexiushan Stadium
2022	1	34	6	5	23	32	62	-30	23	15	R3	DNQ	NH			Yuexiushan Stadium

- ^1 in group stage
- ^2 Liaoning B team promoted to 1 level, but according to CFA rules a club could only enter 1 team in top level so that Senyang replaced Liaoning B's place in 1 level
- ^3 Joins 1994 Jia-A League as 1992 member
- ^4 no relegation

Key

	China top division
	China second division
	China third division
W	Winners
RU	Runners-up
3	Third place
	Relegated

- Pld = Played
- W = Games won
- D = Games drawn
- L = Games lost
- F = Goals for
- A = Goals against
- Pts = Points
- Pos = Final position
- DNQ = Did not qualify
- DNE = Did not enter
- NH = Not Held
- – = Does Not Exist
- R1 = Round 1
- R2 = Round 2
- R3 = Round 3
- R4 = Round 4
- F = Final
- SF = Semi-finals
- QF = Quarter-finals
- R16 = Round of 16
- Group = Group stage
- GS2 = Second Group stage
- QR1 = First Qualifying Round
- QR2 = Second Qualifying Round
- QR3 = Third Qualifying Round

=== International results ===
Guangzhou City played in the Asian Champions League in 2015. They beat Singaporean side Warriors FC and Australian team Central Coast Mariners in the qualifying rounds but were knocked-out in the group stage.

== R&F (Hong Kong) ==
In August 2016, it was announced that R&F had entered a satellite team into the Hong Kong Premier League. Players registered for the Chinese Super League are ineligible to play in the Hong Kong Premier League, and vice versa. R&F (Hong Kong) played their home matches at the Siu Sai Wan Sports Ground during the first season. The following year, they were permitted to play their home matches at Yanzigang Stadium in Guangzhou under the condition that all away teams' travelling expenses would be covered by R&F.

== Past and present internationals ==
This list contains the present and former international football players playing for Guangzhou City.

Australia

- Apostolos Giannou (2016–2017)

China

- Cheng Yuelei (2012–2023)
- Li Jianhua (2013–2015)
- Liu Dianzuo (2015–2016)
- Han Jiaqi (2019–)
- Jiang Ning (2013–2015)
- Jiang Zhipeng (2014–2017)
- Shi Xiaotian (2007–2014)
- Tang Miao (2011–)
- Wang Xiaolong (2014–2016)
- Wu Weian (2012–2014)
- Wu Pingfeng (2013–2014)
- Xiao Zhi (2016–2019)
- Xu Bo (2004–2014)
- Yu Yang (2015–2016)
- Zhang Shuo (2011–2015)
- Zhang Yaokun (2013–2016)
- Zhang Yuan (2012–2015)

DR Congo

- Jeremy Bokila (2015)

Israel

- Eran Zahavi (2016–2020)
- Dia Saba (2019–2020)

Hong Kong

- Tan Chun Lok (2019–)

South Korea

- Jang Hyun-soo (2014–2017)
- Park Jong-woo (2014–2015)

Morocco

- Abderrazak Hamdallah (2014–2015)

Nigeria

- Yakubu Ayegbeni (2012–2013)
- Aaron Samuel Olanare (2014–2015)

Sweden

- Gustav Svensson (2016, 2021)
