= Chinese Jia-A League =

- Founded: 1987 (Semi-professional); 1994 (Professional)
- Country: China
- Confederation: AFC (Asia)
- Level on pyramid: 1
- Relegation to: Chinese Jia-B League
- Domestic cup: Chinese FA Cup
- International cup: AFC Champions League
- Most championships: Dalian Shide (7 titles)

The National Football Jia A League (simplified Chinese: 全国足球甲A联赛), commonly known as Jia-A, was the highest tier of professional football in the People's Republic of China, during 1994 through 2003, operating under the auspices of the Chinese Football Association.

The Chinese Professional Football League was established in 1994. Under the direct supervision of the CFA's Professional League Committee, this nationwide league was divided into Divisions 1 and 2. Division 1 was subdivided into Divisions 1A and 1B, Jia A and Jia B, Jia being the Chinese word for top or first. Division 2 was and still is subdivided into regional divisions.

== History ==
=== Pre history ===
Pre 1980, China National League clubs was owned by their respective local physical culture and sports committees, sports institutes, and army sports units. Factory-owned clubs were not allowed to participate in national leagues. Dalian Dockyard, founded in 1946, was a factory-owned club, and as such could only participate in regional tournaments and national workers championship matches. In 1980, the Chinese Football Association (CFA) started to allow factory clubs to play in national leagues. Dalian Dockyard entered the National League in 1981, and in 1983, became Dalian FC, the current Dalian Shide.

In the mid-1980s, the CFA encourage factories and companies to sponsor government-owned clubs. In 1984, Guangdong, Beijing, Guangzhou and Tianjin teams were sponsored by big companies for the first time. CCTV started to show domestic league matches to the whole country. According to some articles, the match between Beijing Snowflakes and Guangdong Wanbao was a turning point for football fan participation. In 1988, Liaoning became China's first professional club, soon becoming one of Asia's best club. Liaoning was the 1990 ACC Champions, 1991 runner-up, and 1987 third place team.

=== The foundation ===
In 1986, CFA tried to find a way to found a semi-pro league, that season National League division 1 signed its first sponsor contract, Goldlion became first main sponsor of China football league.gradually more and more fans bought tickets to watch football leagues.

In 1987 the National League Division 1 was divided into two levels- Jia-A (8 teams) and Jia-B (12 teams), CFA never admit there was a semi-pro league before 1993, because of the restrict by some laws, the enterprises could only cooperate with the government in club managements. so actually we could consider it as an enterprise league though not so accurate to describe the league.

the 8 Jia-A teams in 1987 are:

Liaoning Dongyao - Now Liaoning FC, became professional team in 1988

Tianjing Seagull - Now Tianjin Teda, became pro club in 1995

Shanghai Shenzhou - Name changed to Shanghai Shenhua in 1991 and became pro club in 1993, now Shanghai Shenhua United FC

Shandong - Now Shandong Luneng Taishan, became pro-club in 1993

August first - the Army team

Beijing Snowflakes - Name Changed to Beijing Guoan in 1992 and became pro-clubs

Guangzhou Baiyunshan - Now Guangzhou Yiyao, became professional club in 1992

Hubei Energy - Now Wuhan Guanggu, became professional club in 1994

=== Professionalism ===
In the early 1990s, CFA allows enterprises to purchase football clubs and manage them, whether they are state-owned enterprises or private-owned companies, Dalian Hualu - the former Dalian Dockyard, was bought by a private-owned company, Name changed to Dalian Wanda and became a professional club in 1993.

In 1992, CFA made an important decision - The China professional league will start in 1994, they order all the Jia-A clubs set up professional system before 1994, and for Jia-B clubs, they must realize professional structural reform before 1995. after that CFA hold a semi-pro football championship in 1993, and finally, in 1994, first ever professional leagues in China football history started. and in 1995, Jia-B announced to be a pro-league, which is still the second level. Jia-A and Jia-B, was named as C-league to represent the professional stage.

=== From Jia-A to CSL ===
Compared to Jia A, the Chinese Super League is a lot more demanding on teams. The CFA and CSL committee has imposed a range of minimum criteria to ensure professional management and administration, financial probity and a progressive youth development programme at every club. besides the regular professional league, CSL also has reserve league, U-19 League, U-17 League and U-15 League, also some cups for the young boys.

the second division, Jia B, with the new name China League, also has a new system.

The CSL and China League's goals are to promote high quality and high level competition; introduce advanced managerial concepts to the market; enforce the delivery of minimum standards of professionalism; encourage the influx of more higher quality foreign coaches and players; and gradually establish the European system for player registrations and transfers.

== Jia-A League champions ==
=== Semi-pro seasons (1987-1993) ===
Season	Winners	Total wins	Runners-up	Third-place	Number of clubs
1987	Liaoning	1	Tianjin	Shanghai	8
1988	Liaoning	2	Shandong	Shanghai	21
1989	China B	1	Liaoning	Shanghai	8
1990	Liaoning	3	August 1st	Dalian	8
1991	Liaoning	4	Shanghai	Beijing	8
1992	Liaoning	5	Guangzhou FC	Dalian	8
1993	Liaoning	6	Guangdong	Beijing	8

=== Professional seasons (1994-2003) ===
Season	Winners	Total wins	Runners-up	Third-place	fourth-placed	Number of clubs
1994	Dalian Wanda	1	Guangzhou Apollo	Shanghai Shenhua	Liaoning Yuandong	12
1995	Shanghai Shenhua	1	Beijing Guoan	Dalian Wanda	Guangdong Hongyuan	12
1996	Dalian Wanda	2	Shanghai Shenhua	August 1st	Beijing Guoan	12
1997	Dalian Wanda	3	Shanghai Shenhua	Beijing Guoan	Yanbian Aodong	12
1998	Dalian Wanda	4	Shanghai Shenhua	Beijing Guoan	Guangzhou Songri	14
1999	Shandong Luneng	1	Liaoning Fushun	Sichuan Quanxing	Chongqing Longxin	14
2000	Dalian Shide F.C.	5	Shanghai Shenhua	Sichuan Quanxing	Chongqing Longxin	14
2001	Dalian Shide F.C.	6	Shanghai Shenhua	Liaoning Fushun	Sichuan Quanxing	14
2002	Dalian Shide F.C.	7	Shenzhen Ping'an	Beijing Guoan	Shandong Luneng	15
2003	~~Shanghai Shenhua~~	--^{1}	Shanghai International	Dalian Shide F.C.	Shenzhen Jianlibao	15

^1 Shanghai Shenhua were stripped of the title on 19 February 2013 for the match-fixing scandal in this season.

=== Most successful clubs (1994-2003) ===
Club	Champions	Runners-up	Winning seasons	Runners-up seasons
Dalian Shide F.C.	7	0	1994, 1996, 1997, 1998, 2000, 2001, 2002	
Shanghai Shenhua	1	5	1995, ~~2003~~	1996, 1997, 1998, 2000, 2001
Shandong Luneng	1	0	1999	
Guangzhou Evergrande	0	1		1994
Beijing Guoan	0	1		1995
Liaoning Fushun	0	1		1999
Shenzhen FC	0	1		2002
Shanghai International	0	1		2003

=== Former clubs (1994-2003) ===
Club	Seasons in Jia-A League	Best finish	Worst finish	Current league
Shandong Luneng Taishan	1994 to 2003	1st, 1999	12th, 2003	Chinese Super League
Shanghai Shenhua	1994 to 2003	1st, 1995	12th, 2002	Chinese Super League
Beijing Guoan	1994 to 2003	2nd, 1995	9th, 2003	Chinese Super League
Tianjin Teda	1995 to 1997, 1999 to 2003	7th, 1999, 2001	11th, 1997	Chinese Super League
Qingdao Jonoon	1995, 1997 to 2003	6th, 1998	13th, 2001	Chinese Super League
Guangzhou Apollo	1994 to 1998	2nd, 1994	14th, 1998	China League One
Shenzhen Jianlibao	1996, 1998 to 2003	2nd, 2002	12th, 1998, 1999	Defunct
Chongqing Lifan	1997 to 2003	4th, 1999, 2000	13th, 2003	Defunct
Shenyang Ginde	1994, 1998 to 2003	5th, 2003	14th, 2001	Defunct
Jiangsu Sainty	1994	12th, 1994		Defunct
Shanghai International	2002 to 2003	2nd, 2003	9th, 2002	Defunct
Liaoning FC	1994 to 1995, 1999 to 2003	2nd, 1999	12th, 1995	Defunct
Yanbian FC	1994 to 2000	4th, 1997	14th, 2000	Defunct
Dalian Shide	1994 to 2003	1st, 1994, 1996, 1997, 1998, 2000, 2001, 2002	9th, 1999	Defunct
Sichuan Guancheng	1994 to 2003	3rd, 1998, 2000	14th, 2002	Defunct
Bayi	1994 to 1998, 2001 to 2003	3rd, 1996	14th, 2003	Defunct
Liaoning FC	1994 to 1995, 1999 to 2003	2nd, 1999	12th, 1995	Defunct
Yunnan Hongta	2000 to 2003	7th, 2002, 2003	12th, 2000	Defunct
Shaanxi Guoli	2001 to 2003	9th, 2001	15th, 2002, 2003	Defunct
Xiamen Lanshi	2000	13th, 2000		Defunct
Yanbian FC	1994 to 2000	4th, 1997	14th, 2000	Defunct
Wuhan Hongjinlong	1998 to 1999	8th, 1998	14th, 1999	Defunct
Guangzhou Songri	1996, 1998 to 1999	4th, 1998	13th, 1999	Defunct
Guangdong Hongyuan	1994 to 1997	4th, 1995	12th, 1997	Defunct

== Attendances ==
=== Season averages ===
Season	Total attendance	Games	Average	Change	High avg.	Team	No. Of Clubs	Relegation Slots
1992	976,000	56	17,429	--	25,000	Guangzhou Baiyunshan	8	-
1994	2,155,000	132	16,326	-6.3%	40,000	Sichuan Quanxing	12	2
1995	3,140,280	132	23,790	+45.7%	40,182	Sichuan Quanxing	12	2
1996	3,203,122	132	24,266	+2.0%	42,272	Jinan Taishan	12	2
1997	2,801,100	132	21,220	-14.4%	39,180	Sichuan Quanxing	12	2
1998	3,883,000	182	21,335	+0.5%	39,713	Shanghai Shenhua	14	2
1999	3,623,500	182	19,909	-7.2%	33,538	Shandong Luneng	14	2
2000	3,622,000	182	19,901	-0.1%	35,615	Shenyang Ginde	14	2
2001	3,329,872	182	18,296	-8.8%	38,700	Shanxi Guoli	14	-
2002	3,146,640	210	14,984	-22.1%	32,429	Beijing Guo'an	15	-
2003	3,719,700	210	17,710	+18.2%	30,500	Dalian Shide	15	3

=== Attendance by clubs ===
This table lists average attendances of Jia-A League clubs during 1994-2003 yearly, but only for seasons when that club played in the top division. Club names are as of 2003 season.

Team	Crowd average									
Team	1994	1995	1996	1997	1998	1999	2000	2001	2002	2003
August 1st	15,818	18,818	12,091	16,000	16,769	-	-	14,385	13,429	13,071
Beijing Guoan	14,091	26,364	36,182	24,727	27,538	24,231	18,692	15,385	32,429	16,500
Chongqing Lifan	-	-	-	27,727	24,000	17,231	16,615	21,615	14,893	19,286
Dalian Shide	26,636	22,273	29,364	19,455	27,769	17,769	27,077	21,385	18,429	30,500
Guangdong Hongyuan	9,091	20,545	15,182	9,091	-	-	-	-	-	-
Guangzhou FC	10,545	18,818	13,091	15,364	5,385	-	-	-	-	-
Guangzhou Songri	-	-	11,727	-	7,308	12,308	-	-	-	-
Jiangsu Sainty	5,364	-	-	-	-	-	-	-	-	-
Liaoning FC	15,364	22,727	-	-	-	24,538	16,846	15,846	6,964	13,786
Qingdao Jonoon	-	13,364	-	10,545	11,538	12,192	16,923	15,308	6,214	12,429
Shandong Luneng Taishan	19,727	24,545	42,272	22,545	28,231	33,538	27,231	21,385	21,571	23,286
Shanghai International	-	-	-	-	-	-	-	-	17,500	17,821
Shanghai Shenhua	20,909	27,909	26,727	19,636	39,713	17,462	18,462	18,000	12,464	22,214
Shanxi Guoli	-	-	-	-	-	-	-	38,700	9,500	19,357
Shenyang Ginde	5,591	-	-	-	15,077	11,923	35,615	12,000	14,500	18,857
Shenzhen Jianlibao	-	-	18,182	-	19,000	20,769	15,769	16,231	15,571	18,357
Sichuan Guancheng	40,000	40,182	41,455	39,180	34,231	33,077	23,462	20,654	9,607	11,786
Tianjin Teda	-	19,173	20,345	17,091	-	13,692	13,692	10,154	9,250	13,000
Wuhan Yaqi	-	-	-	-	22,077	12,077	-	-	-	-
Xiamen Lanshi	-	-	-	-	-	-	16,615	-	-	-
Yanbian FC	21,818	27,818	25,545	33,000	27,538	26,692	12,385	-	-	-
Yunnan Hongta	-	-	-	-	-	-	15,923	16,846	9,126	14,071
Whole season	16,326	23,790	24,266	21,220	21,335	19,909	19,901	18,296	14,984	17,710

== Awards ==
The official Chinese Jia-A League annual awards are given to players, managers and referees based on their performance during the season.

=== Most valuable player ===
Year	Footballer	Club	Nationality
1994	Li Bing	Liaoning Yuandong	China
1995	Fan Zhiyi	Shanghai Shenhua	China
1996	Su Maozhen	Shandong Luneng	China
1997	Jorge Luis Campos	Beijing Guoan	Paraguay
1998	Hao Haidong	Dalian Wanda	China
1999	Qu Shengqing	Liaoning FC	China
2000	Yang Chen	Eintracht Frankfurt	China
2001	Li Tie	Liaoning FC	China
2002	Zheng Zhi	Shenzhen Jianlibao	China
2003	Jörg Albertz	Shanghai Shenhua	Germany

=== Golden Boot award ===
Season	Top scorer	Club	Goals
1994	(China) Hu Zhijun	Guangzhou Apollo	17
1995	(China) Fan Zhiyi	Shanghai Shenhua	15
1996	(China) Su Maozhen	Shandong Luneng Taishan	13
1997	(China) Hao Haidong	Dalian Wanda	14
1998	(China) Hao Haidong	Dalian Wanda	18
1999	(China) Qu Shengqing	Liaoning Fushun	17
2000	(Paraguay) Casiano Delvalle	Shandong Luneng Taishan	15
2001	(China) Hao Haidong	Dalian Shide	16
2002	(China) Li Jinyu	Liaoning FC	15
2003	(Honduras) Saul Martínez (China) Li Yi (Ghana) Kwame Ayew	Shanghai Shenhua; Shenzhen Jianlibao; Changsha Ginde	14

== Sponsors ==
Sponsorships
Season	Sponsor	Annual Value	Official League Name
1994	Marlboro	$1.2 million	Marlboro Jia-A League
1995	Marlboro	$1.32 million	Marlboro Jia-A League
1996	Marlboro	$1.44 million	Marlboro Jia-A League
1997	Marlboro	$1.56 million	Marlboro Jia-A League
1998	Marlboro	$1.68 million	Marlboro Jia-A League
1999	Pepsi	$10 million	Pepsi Jia-A League
2000	Pepsi	$11 million	Pepsi Jia-A League
2001	Pepsi	$12 million	Pepsi Jia-A League
2002	Pepsi	$13 million	Pepsi Jia-A League
2003	Siemens Mobile	$5 million	Siemens Mobile Jia-A League
