= Qu Shengqing =

Chinese footballer and coach

Qu Shengqing 曲圣卿
Personal information
- Date of birth: June 5, 1975 (age 51)
- Place of birth: Shenyang, Liaoning, China
- Height: 1.82 m (6 ft 0 in)
- Position: Striker

Senior career*
Years	Team	Apps	(Gls)
1994–2000	Liaoning FC	82	(24)
2001–2006	Shanghai Shenhua	76	(38)
2004–2006	→ Adelaide United (loan)	21	(7)
2006	→ Nanjing Yoyo (loan)	10	(1)
2006–2007	Adelaide United	7	(1)
2009	Shenyang Dongjin	0	(0)
Total		196	(71)

International career^{‡}
1999–2003	China	13	(5)

Managerial career
- 2011–2012: Guangzhou Evergrande Reserve
Medal record
Representing China
Men's football
AFC U-16 Championship
Gold medal – first place	1992 Saudi Arabia	Team
- * Club domestic league appearances and goals as of July 4, 2011 ‡ National team caps and goals as of July 4, 2011

Qu Shengqing (Chinese: 曲圣卿; pinyin: Qū Shèngqīng born June 5, 1975) is a Chinese football coach and former international player. As a player he represented Liaoning FC where he won the Golden Boot in the 1999 league season before joining Shanghai Shenhua. He would also move abroad to A-League side Adelaide United before returning to China to end his career with lower sides Nanjing Yoyo and Shenyang Dongjin. Since retiring he has moved into coaching and mainly works for Tongji University.

== Biography ==
Born in Shenyang, China, Qu's first team football club was Liaoning FC. He soon excelled at the club and became one of the top strikers in China. Qu was the top goal scorer in the Chinese league in 1999 with 17 goals. Along with being top scorer Qu was also voted "Mr Soccer of China" for 1999, the award for the top player of the year. Qu joined Shanghai Shenhua in 2000 and scored a total of 38 goals for the club during his fours years there, which included him winning the 2003 league title. Unfortunately in 2013 the Chinese Football Association would revoke the league title after it was discovered the Shenhua General manager Lou Shifang had bribed officials to be bias to Shenhua in games that season.

After a successful trial with Adelaide United in February 2005, Qu was quickly signed by the club in April of the same year. He scored his first goal in the A-League on September 18, 2005, in a 2–1 victory over Perth Glory. Qu soon established himself as a top striker in the A-League. He finished the season with seven goals in 17 appearances for the club.

Qu went back to China after the season was over citing he and his family were homesick. He signed with Nanjing Yoyo of the Chinese Jia League in March 2006. After just 4 months in China and a string of poor performances, Qu signed with Adelaide United once again.

In December 2006, Qu's status as Adelaide United's marquee player came into doubt as his ankle injury ruled him out for the rest of the 2006–2007 season, plus the Asian Champions League (which United qualified for on the back of its 2005-06 A-League season minor premiership). With clubs unable to sign players on guest signings for the Champions League, United faced a front-line strike problem as highlighted in the Adelaide Advertiser on 18 December 2006. In April 2007, Qu returned to Shanghai after Adelaide United declined to renew his contract for the 2007-08 A-League season, although he indicated he hoped to stay in contact with the club, and apply for permanent residency in Australia.

== Honours ==
=== Club ===
Shanghai Shenhua

- Chinese Jia-A League: 2003 (revoked due to match-fixing scandal)

Adelaide United

- A-League: 2006

=== Individual ===
- Chinese Jia League Golden Boot Winner: 1999

== See also ==
- List of football records in China
