= Claudio Arturi =

Uruguayan footballer (born 1971)

Personal information
- Full name: Claudio Fabián Arturi Vini
- Date of birth: June 11, 1971 (age 55)
- Place of birth: Buenos Aires, Argentina
- Position: Forward

Senior career*
Years	Team	Apps	(Gls)
1988–1993	Rampla Juniors	41	(7)
1994	Deportes Antofagasta	17	(3)
1995	Unión Española	5	(0)
1995	Basáñez		
1996	Deportes Iquique	10	(0)
1997	Huachipato	24	(5)
1998	Once Caldas		
1998	Unicosta		
1999	Independiente Medellín		
1999–2000	Cultural Leonesa	21	(3)
2001	Tianjin Teda	9	(1)
2001	→ Qingdao Beer (loan)	2	(0)

Managerial career
- Orihuela Costa (youth)
- Montesinos (youth)
- 2018–2019: Torrevieja (youth)
- 2019–2020: Torrevieja
- 2023–: Racing Playas de Orihuela
- * Club domestic league appearances and goals

Claudio Fabián Arturi Vini (born June 11, 1971) is an Argentine naturalized Uruguayan former footballer who played for clubs in Uruguay, Chile, Colombia, Spain and China.

== Teams ==
=== Player ===
- (Uruguay) Rampla Juniors 1988–1993
- (Chile) Deportes Antofagasta 1994
- (Chile) Unión Española 1995
- (Uruguay) Basáñez 1995
- (Chile) Deportes Iquique 1996
- (Chile) Huachipato 1997
- (Colombia) Once Caldas 1998
- (Colombia) Unicosta 1998
- (Colombia) Independiente Medellín 1999
- (Spain) Cultural Leonesa 1999–2000
- (China) Tianjin Teda 2001
- (China) Qingdao Beer 2001

=== Coach ===
- (Spain) CDM Orihuela Costa (youth)
- (Spain) CD Montesinos (youth)
- (Spain) Torrevieja CD (youth) 2018–2019
- (Spain) CD Torrevieja 2019–2020
- (Spain) Racing Playas de Orihuela 2023–Present
