= Du Zhiren =

Chinese footballer (born 1942)

Du Zhiren 杜智仁
Personal information
- Full name: Du Zhiren
- Date of birth: 1948 (age 77–78)
- Place of birth: Guangzhou, Guangdong, China
- Position: Left winger

Youth career
- 1965–1969: Guangdong

Senior career*
Years	Team	Apps	(Gls)
1970–1977	Guangdong		

International career
1975–1976	China		
Medal record
Men's football
Representing China
AFC Asian Cup
Bronze medal – third place	1976 Iran	Team
- * Club domestic league appearances and goals

Du Zhiren
- Simplified Chinese: 杜智仁
- Traditional Chinese: 杜智仁
Transcriptions
Standard Mandarin
- Hanyu Pinyin: Dù zhìrén
- Wade–Giles: Dù^{1} zhì^{1}rén^{2}

Du Zhiren (Chinese: 杜智仁; pinyin: Dù zhìrén; born 1948) is a retired Chinese footballer. Nicknamed "B-Boy", he played as a left winger for his home province of Guangdong in a domestic level throughout the 1970s. He also represented China internationally for their debut in the 1976 AFC Asian Cup.

== Club career ==
Du began his career in 1965 within the youth sector of Guangdong and would remain there throughout the remainder of the 1960s. In 1970, he was promoted to the senior squad. He was recognized by both his style of play with his speed and awareness in front of the goalpost as well as being recognized for his appearance alongside full-back Yue Yongrong. Alongside right winger Ou Weiting, he participated in the 1975 National Games of China where he contributed greatly in the club winning the tournament before retiring two years later.

== International career ==
Du was first called up to represent China through a series of friendlies in 1975. His greatest accomplishment came through making the final 18-man squad of for the 1976 AFC Asian Cup where he played as a reserve with the Chinese Dragons achieving third place.

== Later life ==
Following his retirement, Du would remain in Guangzhou to contribute in the development of grassroots football in the area.
