= Narciso Pezzotti =

Italian footballer (born 1942)

Personal information
- Date of birth: 8 July 1942 (age 83)
- Place of birth: Italy
- Position: Forward

Senior career*
Years	Team	Apps	(Gls)
- Crema
–1964	Bolzano		
1964–1967	Chieti		
1967–1969	Empoli	74	(4)
1969–1971	SPAL	42	(3)
1971–1974	SolbiaSommese	88	(2)
- * Club domestic league appearances and goals

Narciso Pezzotti (born 8 July 1942) is an Italian football manager and former player who last worked as the assistant manager of the China national team.

== Early life ==
Pezzotti has been nicknamed "Ciso".

== Education ==
Pezzotti attended the Istituto magistrale di Crema.

== Career ==
Pezzotti played as a forward.

In 2004, he was appointed assistant manager of the Italy national team, helping the team win the 2006 FIFA World Cup. After retiring, he lived in Pieve, Italy.

== Personal life ==
Pezzotti is a native of Offanengo, Italy. He was born to a family of farmers.
