= Chen Xirong =

Chinese footballer and manager

Chen Xirong 陈熙荣
Personal information
- Full name: Chen Xirong
- Date of birth: 1953 (age 72–73)
- Place of birth: Guangzhou, Guangdong, China
- Position: Midfielder

Senior career*
Years	Team	Apps	(Gls)
1976–1984	Guangdong Team		

International career
1976–1982	China	15	(1)

Managerial career
- 1984–1987: Guangzhou Youth
- 1987–1989: China U20
- 1990–1992: Guangdong Team
- 1992: China (caretaker)
- 1992–1997: China (assist)
- 1992–1997: China U23 (assist)
- 1994: Guangdong Hongyuan
- 1998: Guangzhou Matsunichi
- 1998–1999: Guangzhou Apollo
Medal record
Men's football
Representing China
AFC Asian Cup
Bronze medal – third place	1976 Iran	Team
- * Club domestic league appearances and goals

Chen Xirong
- Simplified Chinese: 陈熙荣
Transcriptions
Standard Mandarin
- Hanyu Pinyin: Chén Xīróng
- IPA: [ʈʂʰə̌n ɕí ɻʊ̌ŋ]
Yue: Cantonese
- Jyutping: Can4 Hei1wing4
- IPA: [tsʰɐn˩.hej˥ wɪŋ˩]

Chen Xirong (born 1953 in Guangzhou) is a former Chinese international football player, coach, and a media pundit. He played for Guangdong FC where he won the club's first ever Chinese league title in 1979, while internationally he represented China in the 1976 Asian Cup and in the 1980 Asian Cup. After retiring, he moved into management where he joined Guangdong FC's cantonese rival Guangzhou FC before becoming a media pundit for Guangdong sports channel.

== Career statistics ==
=== International statistics ===
Competition	Year	Apps	Goal
Asian Cup	1976	1	0
Friendly	1981–1982	2	0
World Cup Qualifier	1980–1982	12	1
Total		15	1

== Honours ==
=== Player ===
Guangdong FC

- China national league: 1979
