= 1993 Chinese Jia-A League =

Season of Chinese football league

Chinese Jia-A League
- Season: 1993
- Champions: Liaoning F.C. (8th title all-time, 6th title in semi-pro era)

The 1993 season of the National Football Jia-A League was the top tier of football in China. It comprised eight teams, and Liaoning Dongyao won the championship.

== First round ==
=== Group A ===
Pos	Team	Pld	W	PKW	PKL	L	GF	GA	GD	Pts
1	Liaoning Dongyao	6	4	1	0	1	11	5	+6	10
2	Guangdong Hongyuan	6	4	0	1	1	11	8	+3	8
3	Shanghai Agfa	6	1	1	1	3	6	11	−5	4
4	Bayi 999	6	1	0	0	5	7	11	−4	2

Source: rsssf.com

=== Group B ===
Pos	Team	Pld	W	PKW	PKL	L	GF	GA	GD	Pts
1	Beijing Guoan	6	2	1	0	3	10	6	+4	6
2	Dalian Hualu	6	2	1	2	1	5	3	+2	6
3	Guangzhou Apollo	6	3	0	1	2	7	9	−2	6
4	Foshan	6	2	1	0	3	9	13	−4	6

Source: rsssf.com

== Second round ==
=== Championship group ===
Pos	Team	Pld	W	PKW	PKL	L	GF	GA	GD	Pts
1	Liaoning Dongyao	6	2	2	0	2	9	8	+1	8
2	Guangdong Hongyuan	6	2	2	0	2	9	9	0	8
3	Beijing Guoan	6	2	1	1	2	7	7	0	6
4	Dalian Hualu	6	1	0	4	1	4	5	−1	2

Source: rsssf.com

=== Consolation group ===
Pos	Team	Pld	W	PKW	PKL	L	GF	GA	GD	Pts
5	Bayi 999	6	2	2	0	2	7	8	−1	8
6	Foshan	6	3	0	1	2	12	6	+6	6
7	Shanghai Agfa	6	1	2	0	3	5	11	−6	6
8	Guangzhou Apollo	6	2	0	3	1	8	7	+1	4

Source: rsssf.com

== Award ==
24 players were awarded the Athlete Award on February 26, 1993.

- Chi Minghua, Li Chaoyang, Wu Wenbing from Guangdong Hongyuan
- Sun Wei, Li Zheng, Sun Xianlu from Liaoning Dongyao
- Li Longhai, Liu Jun, Chen Wei from Shanghai Agfa
- Zhuang Liansheng, Wang Zheng, Gao Mingyuan from Bayi 999
- Li Yong, Huang Qineng, Cai Qinghui from Guangzhou Apollo
- Zhao Shigang, Zhang Enhua, Han Wenhai from Dalian Hualu
- Xie Shaojun, Gao Feng, Cao Xiandong from Beijing Guoan
- Li Xianzhong, Le Jingzhong, Zhang Weiqiu from Foshan
