= 1989 Chinese Jia-A League =

Chinese Jia-A League
- Season: 1989
- Champions: China B (1st title)

Statistics of the Chinese Jia-A League for the 1989 season.

== Overview ==
It was contested by 8 teams, and China B won the championship.

== League standings ==
Pos	Team	Pld	W	D	L	GF	GA	GD	BP	Pts
1	China B	14	9	4	1	29	9	+20	0	31
2	Liaoning F.C.	14	7	3	4	16	12	+4	4	28
3	Shanghai	14	7	2	5	17	13	+4	2	25
4	August 1st	14	4	6	4	10	12	−2	2	20
5	Tianjin	14	5	3	6	13	13	0	1	19
6	Guangdong	14	4	3	7	8	18	−10	4	19
7	Shandong	14	2	8	4	8	10	−2	0	14
8	Guangzhou	14	1	5	8	8	22	−14	2	10

Source: rsssf.com
