= Bayi Football Team =

August 1st Bāyī 八一
- Full name: The People's Liberation Army Bayi Football Club 中国人民解放军八一足球俱乐部
- Founded: 1951; 75 years ago
- Dissolved: 2003; 23 years ago
Home colours	Away colours

The Bayi or August 1st (Chinese: 八一; pinyin: Bāyī), known fully as the People's Liberation Army Bayi Football Club (Chinese: 中国人民解放军八一足球俱乐部), was a football team under the sport branch of the People's Liberation Army (PLA) that played in China's football league system between 1951 and 2003. They were predominantly based in Beijing.

The name Bayi (八一), meaning August 1, is the founding date of the PLA. They started out as an amateur team who occasionally took part in multi-sport events until they took part in the 1951 inaugural Chinese national football league tournament. With their unprecedented monopoly of football talent taken from every army football team in the country they would establish themselves as one of the top teams within the league winning five national league titles in their history.

When the Chinese football league became a fully professional unit in the 1994 league season the club were given special dispensation to remain as semi-professional as possible by having all their members remain active military members while abstaining from foreign players and sponsorship. The cost of professionalism would see the club take on offers from cities that included Taiyuan, Xi'an, Kunming, Shijiazhuang, Xinxiang, Liuzhou, Xiangtan and Hunan for financial reason. They also took sponsorship and changed their name to Bayi Zhengbang and Bayi Xiangtan, however these measures could not stop the club from relegation in 2003. With a loss in prize money and stricter regulations from the Chinese Football Association the People's Liberation Army disbanded the club.

== History ==
The name Bayi (八一), meaning August 1, is the founding date of the People's Liberation Army (in 1927). They started out as an amateur team who occasionally took part in the multi-sport event National Games of China. This would change when China's first fully nationalized national football league tournament started and the club was essentially re-established as a semi-professional unit to compete within the competition. While the club had a strict policy of only having active servicemen within their set-up they hired a professional coach in Dai Linjing as their Head coach in 1952 despite him being a civilian, however his professionalism saw the club go on to win the 1953 league title for the first time.

The club would incorporate existing army football teams such as the Southwest Military Region, Nanjing Army Unit and Shenyang Army Unit football team to give themselves an unprecedented monopoly of football talent throughout the country while based in Beijing. This saw them continue to be title contenders despite Dai Linjing leaving to take on the Chinese national team and the club employing from within when former player Chen Fulai took over the team in 1963. Unfortunately because of the Chinese Cultural Revolution, football in China was halted and Bayi were unable to play any competitive fixtures until 1973. When the club joined the league again in 1974 they would actually improve and go on to win the league title that season. Sustained dominance would see them go on to win the 1977, 1981 and 1986 league titles while also competing in the 1987 Asian Club Championship for the first time.

=== Professional era ===
The club's reign as one of the most successful clubs in China would end with the advent of professionalism within the league. When the first fully professional league season started in 1994 the club were given special dispensation to remain as semi-professional as possible by having all their members remain active military members, however the club did start to take in sponsorship money to pay for the cost of running the club. Some of this money was raised by being paid to play in different cities. However, at first little changed and the team even came third within the 1996 league season. Where the club really struggled was their ability to hold on to their contingent of Chinese international players such as Hao Haidong, Hu Yunfeng and Jiang Jin who started to leave the club for better offers. Since (unlike CSKA Moscow or Partizan Belgrade FC who split from their armies and became professional clubs) it remained the representative team of the PLA, and unlike other clubs in China, Bayi were unable to sign foreign players. They therefore struggled to replace their best players and were relegated to the second tier for the first time in their history.

With less money coming in the club continued to take offers from other cities and sponsors to play for. They moved to Xinxiang and Liuzhou to accommodate their sponsors and while this worked for a brief period. The club gained promotion back into the top tier – the rebranded Chinese Super League – which required more stringent conditions for the club to work in. The loss of prize money and stricter regulations ultimately forced Bayi to disband as the PLA saw the club as an unnecessary drain on resources. The announcement in mid 2003 coincided with the loss in form of the team who were relegated and disbanded at the end of the league season.

== Results ==
All-time League Rankings

- As of the end of 2003 season.

Year	Div	Pld	W	D	L	GF	GA	GD	Pts	Pos.	FA Cup	Super Cup	AFC	Att./G	Stadium
1951	1	7	4	1	2	22	10	+12	9	3	–	–	–		
1953	1	4	4	0	0	17	3	+14	6^{1}	W	–	–	–		
1957	1	11	7	3	1	23	5	+18	28	3	–	–	–		
1958	1	11	6	3	2	20	9	+11	26	12^{2}	–	–	–		
1960	1	14	7	4	3	30	12	+18	11^{3}	7	R1	–	–		
1961	1	16	12	4	0	31	4	+27	13^{3}	RU	NH	–	–		
1962	1	19	16	1	2	41	12	+29	15^{3}	RU	NH	–	–		
1963	1	9	8	1	0	24	8	+16	7^{3}	12	NH	–	–		
1964	1	22	12	4	6	24	17	+7	28	3	NH	–	–		
1965	1	11	6	1	4	19	14	+5	13	RU	NH	–	–		
1974	1	19	14	4	1	44	7	+37	15^{3}	W	NH	–	–		
1976	1	8	7	0	1	21	3	+18	14	1^{1}	NH	–	–		
1977	1	17	11	6	0	39	7	+32	7^{3}	W	NH	–	–		
1978	1	30	17	10	3	56	20	+36	44	RU	NH	–	–		
1979	1	30	12	13	5	35	20	+15	37	3	NH	–	–		
1980	1	29	10	10	9	35	25	+10	30	7	NH	–	–		
1981	1	30	25	–	5				50	W	NH	–	–		
1982	1	30	18	–	12	46	21	+25	36	5	NH	–	–		
1983	1	16	10	–	6	33	20	+13	20	3^{1}	NH	–	–		
1984	1	30	17	–	13	40	37	+3	34	6	R1	–	–		
1985	1	15	12	–	3			+13	26	RU	QF	–	DNQ		
1986	1	14	8	5	1	25	8	+17	21	W	R1	–	DNQ		
1987	1	14	4	5	5	19	23	−4	17	5	NH	–	SF		
1988	1	20	7	9	4	21	16	+5	34.5	8	NH	–	DNQ		
1989	1	14	4	6	4	10	12	−2	20	4	NH	–	DNQ		
1990	1	14	5	7	2	14	8	+6	27	RU	W	–	DNQ		
1991	1	14	5	4	5	15	15	0	15	5	R1	–	DNQ		
1992	1	14	6	3	5	22	17	+5	15	4	R1	–	DNQ		
1993	1	12	3	2/0	7	14	19	−5	10	5	NH	–	DNQ		Jiangmen City Stadium, Guangdong
1994	1	22	6	9	7	15	19	−4	21	9	NH	–	DNQ	15,818	Taiyuan, Shaanxi
1995	1	22	5	8	9	24	23	+1	23	9	R1	DNQ	DNQ	18,818	Xian, Shanxi
1996	1	22	8	11	3	28	19	+9	35	3	R2	DNQ	DNQ	12,091	Kunming, Yunnan
1997	1	22	5	10	7	22	34	−12	25	10	SF	DNQ	DNQ	16,000	Yutong International Sports Center
1998	1	26	8	5	13	27	37	−10	29	13	QF	DNQ	DNQ	16,769	Yutong International Sports Center
1999	2	22	10	6	6	35	25	+10	36	5	R2	DNQ	DNQ		Xinxiang City Sports Center
2000	2	22	9	9	4	34	19	+15	36	RU	R2	DNQ	DNQ		
2001	1	26	5	10	11	24	36	−12	25	12	R1	DNQ	DNQ	14,385	Liuzhou City Sports Centre
2002	1	28	6	12	10	27	41	−14	30	13	SF	DNQ	DNQ	13,429	Xiangtan City Sports Centre
2003	1	28	6	4	18	23	59	−36	22	14	R2	DNQ	DNQ	13,071	Xiangtan City Sports Centre

No league games in 1954–1956, 1966–1973, 1975;

- ^1 In group stage. ^2 Only took part in half of season. ^3 In final group stage.

Key

	China top division
	China second division
	China third division
W	Winners
RU	Runners-up
3	Third place
	Relegated

- Pld = Played
- W = Games won
- D = Games drawn
- L = Games lost
- F = Goals for
- A = Goals against
- Pts = Points
- Pos = Final position
- DNQ = Did not qualify
- DNE = Did not enter
- NH = Not Held
- - = Does Not Exist
- R1 = Round 1
- R2 = Round 2
- R3 = Round 3
- R4 = Round 4
- F = Final
- SF = Semi-finals
- QF = Quarter-finals
- R16 = Round of 16
- Group = Group stage
- GS2 = Second Group stage
- QR1 = First Qualifying Round
- QR2 = Second Qualifying Round
- QR3 = Third Qualifying Round

== Honours ==
=== Domestic ===
- Chinese Jia-A League
  - Champions (5): 1953, 1974, 1977, 1981, 1986
- Chinese FA Cup
  - Winners (1): 1990

=== Invitational ===
- Queen's Cup Thailand
  - Winners (1): 1979

== See also ==
=== Army football clubs in Communist countries ===
- PFC CSKA Moscow
- PFC CSKA Sofia
- FK Partizan
- FK Partizani Tirana
- FC Steaua
- April 25 SC

=== Bayi teams in other sports ===
- PLA Military Sports Training Center
- Nanchang Bayi
- Bayi Rockets
- Bayi Kylin
