= 1990 Chinese Jia-A League =

Chinese Jia-A League
- Season: 1990
- Champions: Liaoning F.C. (5th title all-time, 3rd title in semi-pro era)

Statistics of the Chinese Jia-A League for the 1990 season.

== Overview ==
It was contested by 8 teams, and Liaoning F.C. won the championship.

== League standings ==
Pos	Team	Pld	W	D	L	GF	GA	GD	BP	Pts
1	Liaoning F.C.	14	7	3	4	17	11	+6	7	31
2	August 1st	14	5	7	2	14	8	+6	5	27
3	Dalian	14	8	2	4	17	10	+7	0	26
4	Shanghai	14	6	4	4	15	16	−1	4	26
5	Tianjin	14	5	6	3	17	11	+6	1	22
6	China Olympic XI	14	5	5	4	18	13	+5	0	20
7	Guangdong	14	3	6	5	11	17	−6	0	15
8	Henan	14	0	1	13	5	28	−23	0	1

Source: rsssf.com
