= 1987 Chinese Jia-A League =

Chinese Jia-A League
- Season: 1987
- Champions: Liaoning F.C. (3rd title all-time, 1st title in semi-pro era)

The 1987 Chinese Jia-A League was the first edition of top-flight football in China under the auspices of the Chinese Football Association. It featured 8 teams and was sponsored by Hong Kong company Goldlion.

== Overview ==
Eight sides would play on a home and away basis. The winners would be crowned the 1st Jia-A League champions and would qualify for the next edition of the Asian Club Championship.

No teams would be relegated.

== Clubs ==
=== Clubs and locations ===
Location of teams in 1987 Chinese Jia-A League

== League standings ==
Pos	Team	Pld	W	D	L	GF	GA	GD	Pts
1	Liaoning	14	7	4	3	26	17	+9	25
2	Tianjin	14	6	6	2	19	13	+6	24
3	Shanghai	14	6	2	6	20	17	+3	20
4	Shandong	14	5	6	3	14	10	+4	21
5	August 1st	14	4	5	5	19	23	−4	17
6	Beijing	14	5	2	7	19	25	−6	17
7	Guangzhou	14	5	1	8	14	19	−5	16
8	Hubei	14	3	4	7	13	20	−7	13

Source: rsssf.com
