= 1991 Chinese Jia-A League =

Chinese Jia-A League
- Season: 1991
- Champions: Liaoning F.C. (6th title all-time, 4th title in semi-pro era)

Statistics of the Chinese Jia-A League for the 1991 season.

== Overview ==
It was contested by 8 teams, and Liaoning F.C. won the championship.

== League standings ==
Pos	Team	Pld	W	D	L	GF	GA	GD	BP	Pts
1	Liaoning F.C.	14	7	4	3	27	18	+9	2	20
2	Shanghai	14	6	4	4	21	20	+1	0	16
3	Beijing	14	5	5	4	22	21	+1	1	16
4	Guangzhou Baiyunshan	14	4	7	3	16	13	+3	1	16
5	August 1st	14	5	4	5	15	15	0	1	15
6	Dalian Shide	14	5	4	5	17	17	0	1	15
7	China Olympic XI	14	4	6	4	12	12	0	0	14
8	Tianjin	14	2	2	10	8	22	−14	0	6

Source: rsssf.com
