= 1988 Chinese Jia-A League =

Chinese Jia-A League
- Season: 1988
- Champions: Liaoning F.C. (4th title all-time, 2nd title in semi-pro era)

Statistics of Chinese Jia-A League for the 1988 season.

== Overview ==
It was contested by 21 teams, and Liaoning F.C. won the championship.

== First round ==
| Pos | Team | Pld | W | D | L | GF | GA | GD | BP | Pts |
|---|---|---|---|---|---|---|---|---|---|---|
| 1 | Liaoning F.C. | 20 | 11 | 7 | 2 | 36 | 9 | +27 | 6.5 | 46.5 |
| 2 | Tianjin | 20 | 10 | 7 | 3 | 25 | 10 | +15 | 6.5 | 43.5 |
| 3 | Guangzhou | 20 | 10 | 9 | 1 | 28 | 9 | +19 | 3 | 42 |
| 4 | Beijing | 20 | 12 | 2 | 6 | 22 | 18 | +4 | 1.5 | 39.5 |
| 5 | Shandong | 20 | 10 | 6 | 4 | 21 | 11 | +10 | 1.5 | 37.5 |
| 6 | China B | 20 | 10 | 6 | 4 | 27 | 12 | +15 | 0 | 36 |
| 7 | Dalian | 20 | 8 | 7 | 5 | 30 | 21 | +9 | 4.5 | 35.5 |
| 8 | August 1st | 20 | 7 | 9 | 4 | 21 | 16 | +5 | 4.5 | 34.5 |
| 9 | Shanghai | 20 | 9 | 3 | 8 | 34 | 22 | +12 | 3 | 33 |
| 10 | Guangdong | 20 | 7 | 7 | 6 | 26 | 22 | +4 | 4.5 | 32.5 |
| 11 | Tianjin B | 20 | 8 | 10 | 2 | 17 | 11 | +6 | −3 | 31 |
| 12 | Henan | 20 | 7 | 7 | 6 | 20 | 18 | +2 | 3 | 31 |
| 13 | Shenyang Army Unit | 20 | 4 | 11 | 5 | 11 | 15 | −4 | 3 | 26 |
| 14 | Jiangsu | 20 | 6 | 5 | 9 | 18 | 21 | −3 | 3 | 26 |
| 15 | Jilin | 20 | 5 | 7 | 8 | 18 | 23 | −5 | 0 | 22 |
| 16 | Hubei | 20 | 5 | 7 | 8 | 15 | 22 | −7 | 0 | 22 |
| 17 | Shenyang | 20 | 4 | 7 | 9 | 17 | 17 | 0 | 0 | 19 |
| 18 | Beijing Army Unit | 20 | 4 | 5 | 11 | 18 | 25 | −7 | 0 | 17 |
| 19 | Sichuan | 20 | 4 | 4 | 12 | 18 | 41 | −23 | 0 | 16 |
| 20 | Hunan | 20 | 2 | 3 | 15 | 6 | 42 | −36 | 0 | 9 |
| 21 | Shaanxi | 20 | 0 | 5 | 15 | 7 | 50 | −43 | 0 | 5 |

Source: rsssf.com

== Second round ==
=== Places 1–12 ===
==== Group A ====
| Pos | Team | Pld | W | D | L | GF | GA | GD | Pts |
|---|---|---|---|---|---|---|---|---|---|
| 1 | Shandong | 5 | 3 | 2 | 0 | 6 | 2 | +4 | 11 |
| 2 | Shanghai | 5 | 3 | 1 | 1 | 11 | 7 | +4 | 10 |
| 3 | Liaoning F.C. | 5 | 3 | 1 | 1 | 8 | 4 | +4 | 10 |
| 4 | Tianjin B | 5 | 2 | 0 | 3 | 3 | 6 | −3 | 6 |
| 5 | Dalian | 5 | 1 | 1 | 3 | 6 | 9 | −3 | 4 |
| 6 | Guangzhou | 5 | 0 | 1 | 4 | 4 | 10 | −6 | 1 |

Source: rsssf.com

==== Group B ====
| Pos | Team | Pld | W | D | L | GF | GA | GD | Pts |
|---|---|---|---|---|---|---|---|---|---|
| 1 | China B | 5 | 5 | 0 | 0 | 11 | 3 | +8 | 15 |
| 2 | Guangdong | 5 | 4 | 0 | 1 | 7 | 2 | +5 | 12 |
| 3 | August 1st | 5 | 2 | 1 | 2 | 5 | 7 | −2 | 7 |
| 4 | Tianjin | 5 | 1 | 2 | 2 | 4 | 4 | 0 | 5 |
| 5 | Henan | 5 | 0 | 2 | 3 | 1 | 6 | −5 | 2 |
| 6 | Beijing | 5 | 0 | 1 | 4 | 3 | 9 | −6 | 1 |

Source: rsssf.com

=== Final ranking ===
| Pos | Team | Pld | W | D | L | GF | GA | GD | BP | Pts |
|---|---|---|---|---|---|---|---|---|---|---|
| 1 | Liaoning F.C. | 25 | 14 | 8 | 3 | 44 | 13 | +31 | 6.5 | 56.5 |
| 2 | China B | 25 | 15 | 6 | 4 | 38 | 15 | +23 | 0 | 51 |
| 3 | Tianjin | 25 | 11 | 9 | 5 | 29 | 14 | +15 | 6.5 | 48.5 |
| 4 | Shandong | 25 | 13 | 8 | 4 | 27 | 13 | +14 | 1.5 | 48.5 |
| 5 | Guangdong | 25 | 11 | 7 | 7 | 33 | 24 | +9 | 4.5 | 44.5 |
| 6 | Shanghai | 25 | 12 | 4 | 9 | 45 | 29 | +16 | 3 | 43 |
| 7 | Guangzhou | 25 | 10 | 10 | 5 | 32 | 19 | +13 | 3 | 43 |
| 8 | August 1st | 25 | 9 | 10 | 6 | 26 | 23 | +3 | 4.5 | 41.5 |
| 9 | Beijing | 25 | 12 | 3 | 10 | 25 | 27 | −2 | 1.5 | 40.5 |
| 10 | Dalian | 25 | 9 | 8 | 8 | 36 | 30 | +6 | 4.5 | 39.5 |
| 11 | Tianjin B | 25 | 10 | 10 | 5 | 20 | 17 | +3 | −3 | 37 |
| 12 | Henan | 25 | 7 | 9 | 9 | 21 | 24 | −3 | 3 | 33 |

Source: rsssf.com

=== Places 13–21 ===
| Pos | Team |
|---|---|
| 13 | Shenyang Army Unit |
| 14 | Jiangsu |
| 15 | Hubei |
| 16 | Shenyang |
| 17 | Beijing Army Unit |
| 18 | Hunan |
| 19 | Sichuan |
| 20 | Jilin |
| 21 | Shaanxi |
