= 1992 Chinese Jia-A League =

Chinese Jia-A League
- Season: 1992
- Champions: Liaoning F.C. (7th title all-time, 5th title in semi-pro era)

Statistics of the Chinese Jia-A League for the 1992 season.

== Overview ==
It was contested by 8 teams, and Liaoning F.C. won the championship.

== League standings ==
Pos	Team	Pld	W	D	L	GF	GA	GD	Pts
1	Liaoning F.C.	14	8	3	3	25	14	+11	19
2	Guangzhou	14	8	2	4	19	15	+4	18
3	Dalian	14	7	3	4	25	15	+10	17
4	August 1st	14	6	3	5	22	17	+5	15
5	Shanghai	14	6	2	6	18	15	+3	14
6	Beijing	14	5	3	6	21	20	+1	13
7	Guangdong	14	4	5	5	18	24	−6	13
8	Shenyang	14	1	1	12	8	36	−28	3

Source: rsssf.com
