= 1998 Guangzhou Apollo F.C. season =

Guangzhou Apollo F.C. 1998
- Manager: (China) Mai Chao (to 12 June) (China) Chen Xirong (from 13 June)
- Stadium: Guangdong Provincial People's Stadium
- Jia-A League: 14th (Relegated)
- FA Cup: First Round
- Top goalscorer: League: (Federal Republic of Yugoslavia) Ivica Šimičić (8); All: (Federal Republic of Yugoslavia) Ivica Šimičić (9)
- Average home league attendance: 5,385

The 1998 season is the 45th year in Guangzhou Football Club's existence, their 31st season in the Chinese football league and the 5th season in the professional football league. After selling two key players (Peng Weiguo and Hu Zhijun) at the beginning of the season, the club finished the last place of the league in this season and relegated to Jia-B League.

== Squad ==
Note: Flags indicate national team as defined under FIFA eligibility rules; some limited exceptions apply. Players may hold more than one non-FIFA nationality.

No.	Pos.	Nation	Player
1	GK	(China) CHN	Dong Guozhi
3	DF	(China) CHN	Peng Changying (captain)
4	DF	(China) CHN	Chen Yaohua
5	DF	(China) CHN	Peng Jinbo
6	FW	(China) CHN	Lü Jianjun
7	DF	(China) CHN	Ye Zhibin
8	MF	(China) CHN	Wen Junwu
9	DF	(China) CHN	Huang Haibin
11	FW	(China) CHN	Tan Ende
12	DF	(China) CHN	Ma Zhuojun
13	FW	(China) CHN	Min Jin

No.	Pos.	Nation	Player
14	FW	(China) CHN	Yuan Junhui
15	MF	(China) CHN	Liang Jianfeng
16	DF	(China) CHN	Mai Guangliang
17	MF	(China) CHN	Tan Weiming
18	FW	(China) CHN	Zheng Cong
20	FW	(China) CHN	Feng Yongxiang
21	MF	(South Korea) KOR	Park Ji-Ho
22	FW	(Federal Republic of Yugoslavia) YUG	Ivica Šimičić
25	MF	(China) CHN	Zhong Qirong
28	GK	(China) CHN	Kong Guoxian
29	GK	(Australia) AUS	Peter Blazincic

== Transfers ==
=== Winter ===
In

No.	Pos.	Nation	Player
7	DF	(China) CHN	Ye Zhibin (from Guangzhou Songri)
21	MF	(South Korea) KOR	Park Ji-Ho (from (South Korea) Pohang Steelers)
22	FW	(Federal Republic of Yugoslavia) YUG	Ivica Šimičić (from (Federal Republic of Yugoslavia) FK Zvezdara)
28	GK	(China) CHN	Kong Guoxian (from Guangzhou Songri)

Out

No.	Pos.	Nation	Player
7	FW	(China) CHN	Hu Zhijun (to Guangzhou Songri)
8	MF	(Australia) AUS	Robert Markovac (to (Australia) Green Gully)
9	MF	(China) CHN	Wen Zhijun (loan to Beijing Kuanli)
10	MF	(China) CHN	Peng Weiguo (to Qianwei Huandao)
27	FW	(Nigeria) NGA	Dominic Iorfa (to (Hong Kong) Buler Rangers)

== Match results ==
=== Jia-A League ===
22 March 1998	Sichuan Quanxing	2 – 2	Guangzhou Apollo	Chengdu
	Wei Qun 10'; Li Bing 53'		Huang Haibin 44'; Ma Zhuojun 80'	Stadium: Chengdu Sports Centre

29 March 1998	Qianwei Huandao	1 – 0	Guangzhou Apollo	Chongqing
	Feng Zhigang 90'			Stadium: Datianwan Stadium

5 April 1998	Guangzhou Apollo	2 – 2	Beijing Guoan	Guangzhou
	Šimičić 23'; Tan Ende 35'		Olivas 30'; Li Dongbo 89'	Stadium: Guangdong Provincial People's Stadium

9 April 1998	Guangzhou Apollo	2 – 2	Guangzhou Songri	Guangzhou
	Šimičić 12', 22'		Tony 3'; Li Zifei 11'	Stadium: Guangdong Provincial People's Stadium

12 April 1998	Shenzhen Ping'an	0 – 2	Guangzhou Apollo	Shenzhen
			Peng Changying 32'; Lü Jianjun 68'	Stadium: Shenzhen Stadium

19 April 1998	Guangzhou Apollo	0 – 1	Bayi	Guangzhou
			Wang Lei 47'	Stadium: Guangdong Provincial People's Stadium

26 April 1998	Dalian Wanda	2 – 1	Guangzhou Apollo	Dalian
	Fjellström 19'; Wang Tao 68'		Feng Yongxiang 86'	Stadium: Jinzhou Stadium

30 April 1998	Guangzhou Apollo	1 – 3	Shandong Luneng Taishan	Guangzhou
	Park Ji-Ho 37'		Wang Chao 25'; Deng Lejun 38', 67'	Stadium: Guangdong Provincial People's Stadium

3 May 1998	Yanbian Aodong	2 – 0	Guangzhou Apollo	Yanji
	Li Guanghao 8'; Choi Seung-Bum 54'			Stadium: Yanji People's Stadium

10 May 1998	Guangzhou Apollo	2 – 2	Shanghai Shenhua	Guangzhou
	Šimičić 15', 73'		Shen Si 21'; Osvaldo 60'	Stadium: Guangdong Provincial People's Stadium

17 May 1998	Shenyang Haishi	0 – 0	Guangzhou Apollo	Shenyang
				Stadium: Shenyang Stadium

31 May 1998	Guangzhou Apollo	0 – 0	Wuhan Hongjinlong	Guangzhou
				Stadium: Guangdong Provincial People's Stadium

7 June 1998	Qingdao Hainiu	0 – 0	Guangzhou Apollo	Qingdao
				Stadium: Hongcheng Stadium

26 July 1998	Guangzhou Apollo	2 – 3	Sichuan Quanxing	Guangzhou
	Park Ji-Ho 10'; Šimičić 22'		Pérez 11', 36'; Ma Mingyu 75'	Stadium: Guangdong Provincial People's Stadium

2 August 1998	Guangzhou Apollo	3 – 2	Qianwei Huandao	Guangzhou
	Šimičić 1', 13'; Park Ji-Ho 4'		Zeng Qinggao 18'; Williams 44'	Stadium: Guangdong Provincial People's Stadium

6 August 1998	Beijing Guoan	1 – 0	Guangzhou Apollo	Beijing
	Olivas 85'			Stadium: Workers Stadium

9 August 1998	Guangzhou Songri	3 – 1	Guangzhou Apollo	Guangzhou
	Hu Zhijun 34'; Flávio 75'; Tu Shengqiao 82'		Park Ji-Ho 83'	Stadium: Guangdong Provincial People's Stadium

16 August 1998	Guangzhou Apollo	0 – 1	Shenzhen Ping'an	Guangzhou
			Zhang Jun 82'	Stadium: Guangdong Provincial People's Stadium

23 August 1998	Bayi	2 – 1	Guangzhou Apollo	Shijiazhuang
	Jiang Kun 57'; Wang Lei 83'		Tan Weiming 70'	Stadium: Yutong International Sports Center

6 September 1998	Guangzhou Apollo	1 – 2	Dalian Wanda	Guangzhou
	Min Jin 83'		Eklund 46'; Fjellström 62'	Stadium: Guangdong Provincial People's Stadium

13 September 1998	Shandong Luneng Taishan	2 – 0	Guangzhou Apollo	Jinan
	Deng Lejun 69'; Song Yuming 75'			Stadium: Shandong Stadium

20 September 1998	Guangzhou Apollo	2 – 0	Yanbian Aodong	Guangzhou
	Tan Weiming 34'; Min Jin 37'			Stadium: Guangdong Provincial People's Stadium

4 October 1998	Shanghai Shenhua	2 – 0	Guangzhou Apollo	Shanghai
	Marcelo 27'; Zhu Qi 36'			Stadium: Shanghai Stadium

11 October 1998	Guangzhou Apollo	2 – 1	Shenyang Haishi	Guangzhou
	Park Ji-Ho 50'; Yuan Junhui 83'		Rosinaldo 35'	Stadium: Guangdong Provincial People's Stadium

18 October 1998	Wuhan Hongjinlong	4 – 0	Guangzhou Apollo	Wuhan
	Li Xiao 54', 56'; Cai Sheng 58'; Li Yingpei 69'			Stadium: Xinhua Road Sports Center

25 October 1998	Guangzhou Apollo	1 – 1	Qingdao Hainiu	Guangzhou
	Zheng Cong 87'		Zhuang Yi 5'	Stadium: Guangdong Provincial People's Stadium

=== FA Cup ===
24 May 1998 First Round	Jiangsu Jiajia	2 – 0	Guangzhou Apollo	Yangzhou
				Stadium: Yangzhou Stadium

27 May 1998 First Round	Guangzhou Apollo	2 – 1	Jiangsu Jiajia	Nanchang
	Šimičić; Feng Yongxiang			Stadium: Nanchang Bayi Stadium
