= 1997 Chinese FA Cup =

1997 China Football Association Cup
CFA Cup

Tournament details
- Country: China
- Teams: 24

Final positions
- Champions: Beijing Guoan (2nd title)
- Runners-up: Shanghai Shenhua
- Asian Cup Winners' Cup: Beijing Guoan

Tournament statistics
- Matches played: 45
- Goals scored: 124 (2.76 per match)
- Top goal scorer(s): (Spain) Andrés Olivas (Paraguay) Casiano Delvalle (China) Nan Fang (Denmark) Riffi Haddaoui (4 goals)

The PHILIPS 1997 China FA Cup (Chinese: 1997飞利浦中国足球协会杯) was the third edition of Chinese FA Cup. The cup title sponsor was Philips.

== Results ==
=== First round ===
==== First leg ====
| 20 April | Yanbian Aodong | 0 – 1 | Liaoning FC | Longjing Stadium, Longjing |

| 20 April | Shenzhen Kinspar | 2 – 1 | Shanghai Yuyuan | Shenzhen Stadium, Shenzhen |

| 20 April | Henan Construction | 2 – 3 | Qingdao Etsong Hainiu | Henan Provincial Stadium, Zhengzhou |

| 20 April | Huochetou | 0 – 0 | Bayi | Ningbo Fubang Stadium, Ningbo |

| 20 April | Qianwei Huandao | 4 – 1 | Shenzhen Ping'an | Datianwan Stadium, Chongqing |

| 20 April | Foshan Fosti | 1 – 1 | Tianjin Lifei Samsung | New Plaza Stadium, Foshan |

| 20 April | Tianjin Vanke | 1 – 1 | Guangzhou Apollo | Minyuan Stadium, Tianjin |

| 20 April | Shenyang Sealion | 4 – 2 | Wuhan Yaqi | Wulihe Stadium, Shenyang |

==== Second leg ====
| 27 April | Liaoning FC | 0 – 0 (1 - 0 agg.) | Yanbian Aodong | Fushun Leifeng Stadium, Fushun |

| 27 April | Shanghai Yuyuan | 3 – 1 (4 - 3 agg.) | Shenzhen Kinspar | Zhabei Stadium, Shanghai |

| 27 April | Qingdao Etsong Hainiu | 2 – 2 (5 - 4 agg.) | Henan Construction | Qingdao First Stadium, Qingdao |

| 27 April | Bayi | 1 – 0 (1 - 0 agg.) | Huochetou | Yutong International Sports Center, Shijiazhuang |

| 27 April | Shenzhen Ping'an | 1 – 1 (2 - 5 agg.) | Qianwei Huandao | Shenzhen Stadium, Shenzhen |

| 27 April | Tianjin Lifei Samsung | 2 – 0 (3 - 1 agg.) | Foshan Fosti | Minyuan Stadium, Tianjin |

| 27 April | Guangzhou Apollo | 4 – 0 (5 - 1 agg.) | Tianjin Vanke | Nanhai Stadium, Nanhai |

| 27 April | Wuhan Yaqi | 4 – 1 (6 - 5 agg.) | Shenyang Sealion | Huangshi Stadium, Huangshi |

=== Second round ===
==== First leg ====
| 10 May | Liaoning FC | 1 – 3 | Beijing Guoan | Fushun Leifeng Stadium, Fushun |

| 10 May | Shanghai Yuyuan | 4 – 1 | Shanghai Pudong | Zhabei Stadium, Shanghai |

| 10 May | Qingdao Etsong Hainiu | 1 – 2 | Sichuan Quanxing | Qingdao First Stadium, Qingdao |

| 10 May | Bayi | 1 – 0 | Guangdong Hongyuan | Yutong International Sports Center, Shijiazhuang |

| 10 May | Qianwei Huandao | 2 – 1 | Dalian Wanda | Datianwan Stadium, Chongqing |

| 10 May | Tianjin Lifei Samsung | 0 – 3 | Guangzhou Matsunichi | Minyuan Stadium, Tianjin |

| 10 May | Guangzhou Apollo | 1 – 2 | Shanghai Shenhua | Nanhai Stadium, Nanhai |

| 10 May | Wuhan Yaqi | 2 – 2 | Jinan Taishan Jiangjun | Huangshi Stadium, Huangshi |

==== Second leg ====
| 18 May | Beijing Guoan | 1 – 1 (4 - 2 agg.) | Liaoning FC | Workers Stadium, Beijing |

| 18 May | Shanghai Pudong | 1 – 0 (2 - 4 agg.) | Shanghai Yuyuan | Chuansha Stadium, Shanghai |

| 18 May | Sichuan Quanxing | 0 – 1 (2 (a) - 2 agg.) | Qingdao Etsong Hainiu | Chengdu Sports Centre, Chengdu |

| 18 May | Guangdong Hongyuan | 1 – 2 (1 - 3 agg.) | Bayi | Dongguan Stadium, Dongguan |

| 18 May | Dalian Wanda | 0 – 1 (1 - 3 agg.) | Qianwei Huandao | Pulandian Stadium, Dalian |

| 18 May | Guangzhou Matsunichi | 2 – 1 (5 - 1 agg.) | Tianjin Lifei Samsung | Xihe Stadium, Shaoguan |

| 18 May | Shanghai Shenhua | 1 – 1 (3 - 2 agg.) | Guangzhou Apollo | Hongkou Stadium, Shanghai |

| 18 May | Jinan Taishan Jiangjun | 1 – 1 (3 (a) - 3 agg.) | Wuhan Yaqi | Shandong Provincial Stadium, Jinan |

=== Third round ===
==== First leg ====
| 7 September | Shanghai Yuyuan | 0 – 1 | Beijing Guoan | Zhabei Stadium, Shanghai |

| 7 September | Sichuan Quanxing | 1 – 0 | Bayi | Nanchong Sports Centre Stadium, Nanchong |

| 7 September | Guangzhou Matsunichi | 1 – 6 | Qianwei Huandao | Xihe Stadium, Shaoguan |

| 7 September | Shanghai Shenhua | 0 – 0 | Jinan Taishan Jiangjun | Hongkou Stadium, Shanghai |

==== Second leg ====
| 14 September | Beijing Guoan | 1 – 1 (2 - 1 agg.) | Shanghai Yuyuan | Workers Stadium, Beijing |

| 14 September | Bayi | 2 – 0 (2 - 1 agg.) | Sichuan Quanxing | Yutong International Sports Center, Shijiazhuang |

| 14 September | Qianwei Huandao | 3 – 2 (9 - 3 agg.) | Guangzhou Matsunichi | Datianwan Stadium, Chongqing |

| 14 September | Jinan Taishan Jiangjun | 2 – 2 (2 - 2 (a) agg.) | Shanghai Shenhua | Shandong Provincial Stadium, Jinan |

=== Semi-finals ===
==== First leg ====
| 21 September | Bayi | 0 – 5 | Beijing Guoan | Yutong International Sports Center, Shijiazhuang |

| 21 September | Qianwei Huandao | 2 – 0 | Shanghai Shenhua | Datianwan Stadium, Chongqing |

==== Second leg ====
| 28 September | Shanghai Shenhua | 3 – 0 (3 - 2 agg.) | Qianwei Huandao | Hongkou Stadium, Shanghai |

| 7 October | Beijing Guoan | 3 – 0 (8 - 0 agg.) | Bayi | Workers Stadium, Beijing |

=== Final ===
| 28 December | Beijing Guoan | 2 – 1 | Shanghai Shenhua | Workers Stadium, Beijing |
| | Delvalle 39'; Nan Fang 83' | | Deng Lejun 5' (o.g.) | Referee: Kim Young-joo (South Korea); Assistant referees: Yoo Young-tae (South Korea), Kim Hee-wook (South Korea) |
