= 1996 Chinese FA Cup =

1996 China Football Association Cup
CFA Cup

Tournament details
- Country: China
- Teams: 24

Final positions
- Champions: Beijing Guoan (1st title)
- Runners-up: Jinan Taishan Jiangjun
- Asian Cup Winners' Cup: Beijing Guoan

Tournament statistics
- Matches played: 45
- Goals scored: 154 (3.42 per match)
- Top goal scorer(s): (China) Hu Yunfeng (China) Li Bing (China) Song Yuming (5 goals)

The PHILIPS 1996 China FA Cup (Chinese: 1996飞利浦中国足球协会杯) was the second edition of Chinese FA Cup. The cup title sponsor was Philips.

== Results ==
=== First round ===
==== First leg ====
30 June	Jiangsu Gige	2 – 2	Qianwei Huandao	Wuxi Sports Center, Wuxi

30 June	Dalian Shunfa	0 – 1	Tianjin Samsung	Dalian Locomotive Stadium, Dalian

30 June	Henan Construction	1 – 1	Bayi	Henan Provincial Stadium, Zhengzhou

30 June	Shanghai Pudong	2 – 1	Yanbian Hyundai	Chuansha Stadium, Shanghai

30 June	Huochetou	0 – 1	Qingdao Hainiu	Tianjin Huochetou Stadium, Tianjin

30 June	Shenyang Haishi	1 – 3	Shanghai Yuyuan	Wulihe Stadium, Shenyang

30 June	Wuhan Mailyard	2 – 1	Foshan Fosti	Huangshi Stadium, Huangshi

30 June	Shenzhen Fiyta	1 – 1	Guangzhou Apollo	Shenzhen Stadium, Shenzhen

==== Second leg ====
3 July	Qianwei Huandao	3 – 1 (5 - 3 agg.)	Jiangsu Gige	Xinhua Road Stadium, Wuhan

3 July	Tianjin Samsung	7 – 1 (8 - 1 agg.)	Dalian Shunfa	Minyuan Stadium, Tianjin

3 July	Bayi	3 – 2 (4 - 3 agg.)	Henan Construction	Kunming Stadium, Kunming

3 July	Yanbian Hyundai	3 – 2 (4 - 4 (a) agg.)	Shanghai Pudong	Tumen Stadium, Tumen

3 July	Qingdao Hainiu	1 – 0 (2 - 0 agg.)	Huochetou	Qingdao First Stadium, Qingdao

3 July	Shanghai Yuyuan	2 – 1 (5 - 2 agg.)	Shenyang Haishi	Zhabei Stadium, Shanghai

3 July	Foshan Fosti	2 – 2 (3 - 4 agg.)	Wuhan Mailyard	New Plaza Stadium, Foshan

3 July	Guangzhou Apollo	2 – 1 (a.e.t.) (3 - 2 agg.)	Shenzhen Fiyta	Yuexiushan Stadium, Guangzhou

=== Second round ===
==== First leg ====
7 July	Qianwei Huandao	2 – 1	Guangzhou Matsunichi	Xinhua Road Stadium, Wuhan

7 July	Tianjin Samsung	1 – 1	Dalian Wanda	Minyuan Stadium, Tianjin

7 July	Bayi	2 – 3	Sichuan Quanxing	Kunming Stadium, Kunming

7 July	Shanghai Pudong	2 – 1	Liaoning FC	Chuansha Stadium, Shanghai

7 July	Qingdao Hainiu	1 – 0	Guangdong Hongyuan	Qingdao First Stadium, Qingdao

7 July	Shanghai Yuyuan	1 – 1	Beijing Guoan	Zhabei Stadium, Shanghai

7 July	Wuhan Mailyard	1 – 4	Shanghai Shenhua	Huangshi Stadium, Huangshi

7 July	Guangzhou Apollo	2 – 5	Jinan Taishan Jiangjun	Yuexiushan Stadium, Guangzhou

==== Second leg ====
10 July	Guangzhou Matsunichi	2 – 0 (3 - 2 agg.)	Qianwei Huandao	Xihe Stadium, Shaoguan

10 July	Dalian Wanda	2 – 1 (3 - 2 agg.)	Tianjin Samsung	Dalian People's Stadium, Dalian

10 July	Sichuan Quanxing	3 – 2 (6 - 4 agg.)	Bayi	Chengdu Sports Centre, Chengdu

10 July	Liaoning FC	2 – 2 (3 - 4 agg.)	Shanghai Pudong	Wulihe Stadium, Shenyang

10 July	Guangdong Hongyuan	5 – 2 (5 - 3 agg.)	Qingdao Hainiu	Dongguan Stadium, Dongguan

10 July	Beijing Guoan	3 – 2 (4 - 3 agg.)	Shanghai Yuyuan	Workers Stadium, Beijing

10 July	Shanghai Shenhua	3 – 1 (7 - 2 agg.)	Wuhan Mailyard	Hongkou Stadium, Shanghai

10 July	Jinan Taishan Jiangjun	1 – 0 (6 - 2 agg.)	Guangzhou Apollo	Shandong Provincial Stadium, Jinan

=== Third round ===
==== First leg ====
14 July	Guangzhou Matsunichi	1 – 2	Jinan Taishan Jiangjun	Xihe Stadium, Shaoguan

14 July	Dalian Wanda	4 – 1	Shanghai Shenhua	Dalian People's Stadium, Dalian

14 July	Sichuan Quanxing	2 – 0	Beijing Guoan	Chengdu Sports Centre, Chengdu

14 July	Shanghai Pudong	1 – 1	Guangdong Hongyuan	Chuansha Stadium, Shanghai

==== Second leg ====
21 July	Jinan Taishan Jiangjun	2 – 0 (4 - 1 agg.)	Guangzhou Matsunichi	Shandong Provincial Stadium, Jinan

21 July	Shanghai Shenhua	2 – 0 (3 - 4 agg.)	Dalian Wanda	Hongkou Stadium, Shanghai

21 July	Beijing Guoan	4 – 0 (4 - 2 agg.)	Sichuan Quanxing	Workers Stadium, Beijing

21 July	Guangdong Hongyuan	3 – 1 (4 - 2 agg.)	Shanghai Pudong	Dongguan Stadium, Dongguan

=== Semi-finals ===
==== First leg ====
28 July	Beijing Guoan	3 – 0	Dalian Wanda	Workers Stadium, Beijing

28 July	Guangdong Hongyuan	2 – 1	Jinan Taishan Jiangjun	Dongguan Stadium, Dongguan

==== Second leg ====
4 August	Dalian Wanda	1 – 3 (1 - 6 agg.)	Beijing Guoan	Dalian People's Stadium, Dalian

4 August	Jinan Taishan Jiangjun	3 – 0 (4 - 2 agg.)	Guangdong Hongyuan	Shandong Provincial Stadium, Jinan

=== Final ===
3 November	Beijing Guoan	4 – 1	Jinan Taishan Jiangjun	Workers Stadium, Beijing
14:50	Gao Hongbo 20'; Gao Feng 44', 70'; Deng Lejun 68'		Tang Xiaocheng 50'	Referee: Hiroyuki Umemoto (Japan); Assistant referees: Yoshikazu Hiroshima (Japan), Yasuhiro Matsuzaki (Japan)
