= 1997 Chinese Football Super Cup =

Dalian Wanda	Beijing Guoan
1	2
- Date: 12 March 1998
- Venue: Wenzhou Stadium, Wenzhou
- Man of the Match: (Spain) Andrés Olivas

The 1997 Saint Angelo Chinese Football Super Cup (Chinese: 1997年报喜鸟中国足球超霸杯赛) was the 3rd Chinese Football Super Cup, contested by Chinese Jia-A League 1997 winners Dalian Wanda and 1997 Chinese FA Cup winners Beijing Guoan. Andrés Olivas scored the first golden goal in the Chinese football history, which ensured Beijing Guoan win their first Chinese Football Super Cup title.

== Match details ==
12 March 1998
20:00 UTC+8

Dalian Wanda	1 – 2 (a.e.t.)	Beijing Guoan
Wang Tao 16'; Němeček (yellow card) ?' (yellow-red card) 49'		Casiano (red card) 70'; Xie Zhaoyang (red card) 75'; Olivas 80', 119'

Wenzhou Stadium, Wenzhou

Chinese Football Super Cup
1997 Winners
Beijing Guoan
First title
