= Goldin Finance 117 =

Skyscraper in Tianjin, China

- 中国117大厦
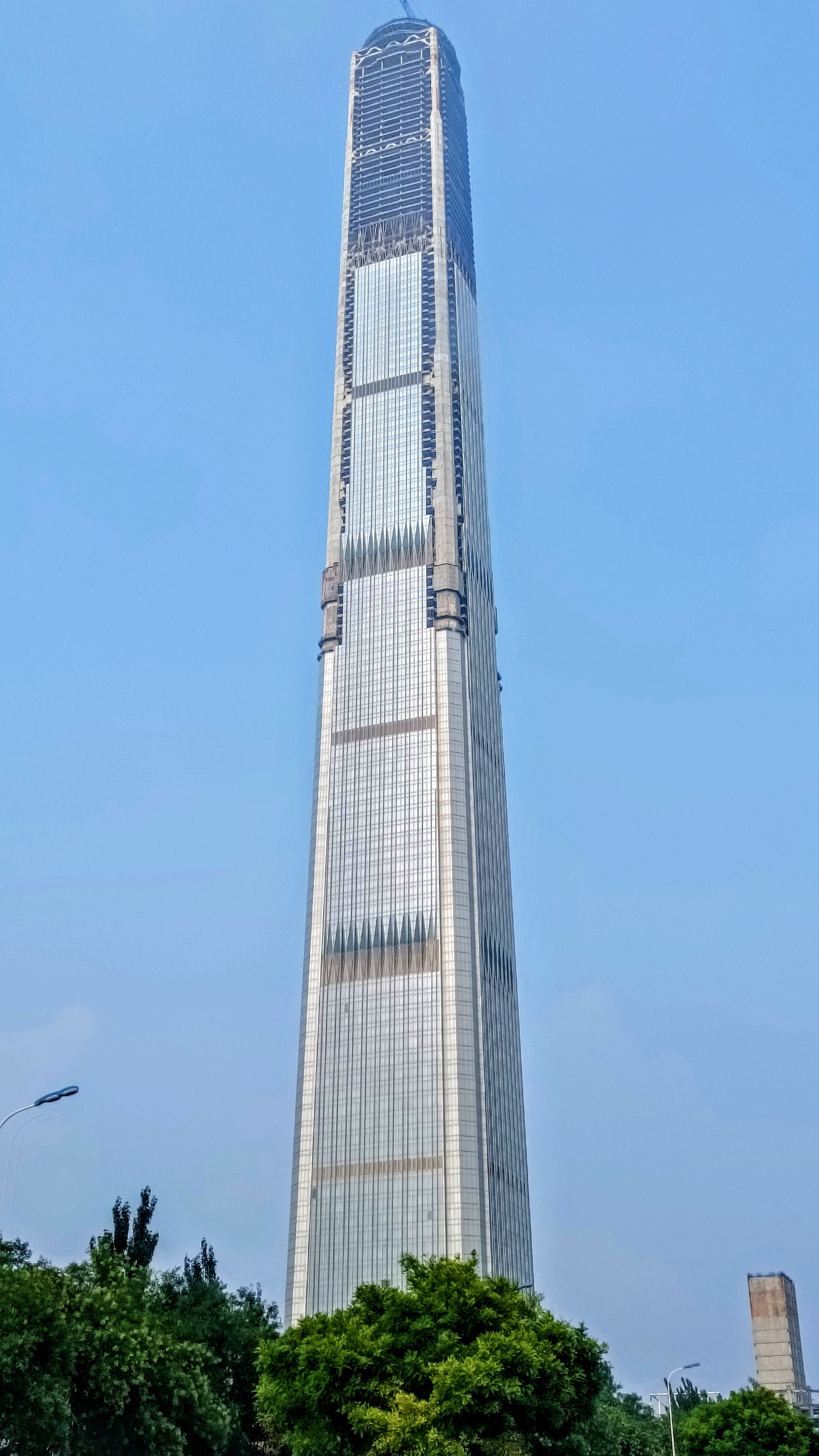
- Goldin Finance 117 in 2024
- Interactive map of the Goldin Finance 117 area
- Alternative names: Walking Stick

General information
- Status: Topped-out
- Location: Xiqing District, Tianjin, China
- Construction started: 16 August 2009
- Topped-out: 8 September 2015
- Estimated completion: 2027
- Owner: Goldin Financial Holdings Ltd.

Height
- Architectural: 597 m (1,959 ft)
- Top floor: 584.1 m (1,916 ft)

Technical details
- Floor count: 128
- Floor area: 370,000 m^{2} (4,000,000 sq ft)
- Lifts/elevators: 89

Goldin Finance 117, also known as the China 117 Tower (Chinese: 中国117大厦), is a topped-out supertall skyscraper in Xiqing District, Tianjin, China. The tower was topped out in 2015 at a height of 597 m (1,957 ft). It has 128 storeys above ground, with 117 of them intended for housing, hotel, and commercial space, which provides the source of the building's name. Designed by P&T Group, construction began in 2009 but was twice halted. In April 2025, it was announced that construction would resume and be completed in 2027.

Goldin Finance 117 and other previously failed skyscraper projects in China were responsible for the government banning construction of buildings over 500 metres (1,640 feet). When completed, Goldin Finance 117 will be one of China's last 500+ m towers for the foreseeable future.

== History ==
Construction of the skyscraper began in 2008 and was scheduled for completion in 2014. However, work was suspended in January 2010 due to the fallout of the Great Recession and eventually resumed in 2011 with the new estimated completion of 2018–2019. The building was topped out on 8 September 2015, making it the fifth-tallest building in the world at the time.

It was originally meant to be the centerpiece in the Goldin Metropolitan Scheme, a mixed-use luxury development on the outskirts of Tianjin catering to the super-rich, although the economic viability of the project was questionable. But around the same time, the building's owner, Goldin Properties (a subsidiary of Goldin Financial Holdings Ltd.), ran into financial difficulties in the aftermath of the June 2015 Chinese stock market crash and was forced to suspend construction in December 2015.

Currently, the building remains unfinished and unoccupied. China State Construction Engineering Corporation, the contractor of the project, removed all on-site workers and left it unfinished. It is currently certified by Guinness World Records as the World's Tallest Unoccupied Building.

On 25 April 2025, it was announced that a new permit for construction was issued for P&T Group and BGI Engineering Consultants so that the project could be finished. Completion is set for 2027.

On 4 January 2026, Tianjin Municipal Party Secretary Chen Min'er and Mayor Zhang Gong held discussions with the principal leaders of China CITIC Group, China State Construction Engineering Corporation, and China Cinda on revitalizing the "117 Project."

On 29 January, the Tianjin Municipal Government included the goal of "fully revitalizing and utilizing the 117 Project and promoting the functional enhancement of surrounding areas" in the Outline of the 15th Five-Year Plan for National Economic and Social Development of Tianjin Municipality.

On 4 February, Tianjin Municipal Party Secretary Chen Min'er and Mayor Zhang Gong, together with Zhang Wenwu, General Manager of CITIC Group, once again visited the construction site of the "117 Project" to conduct an inspection and advance efforts to reactivate and utilize the project.

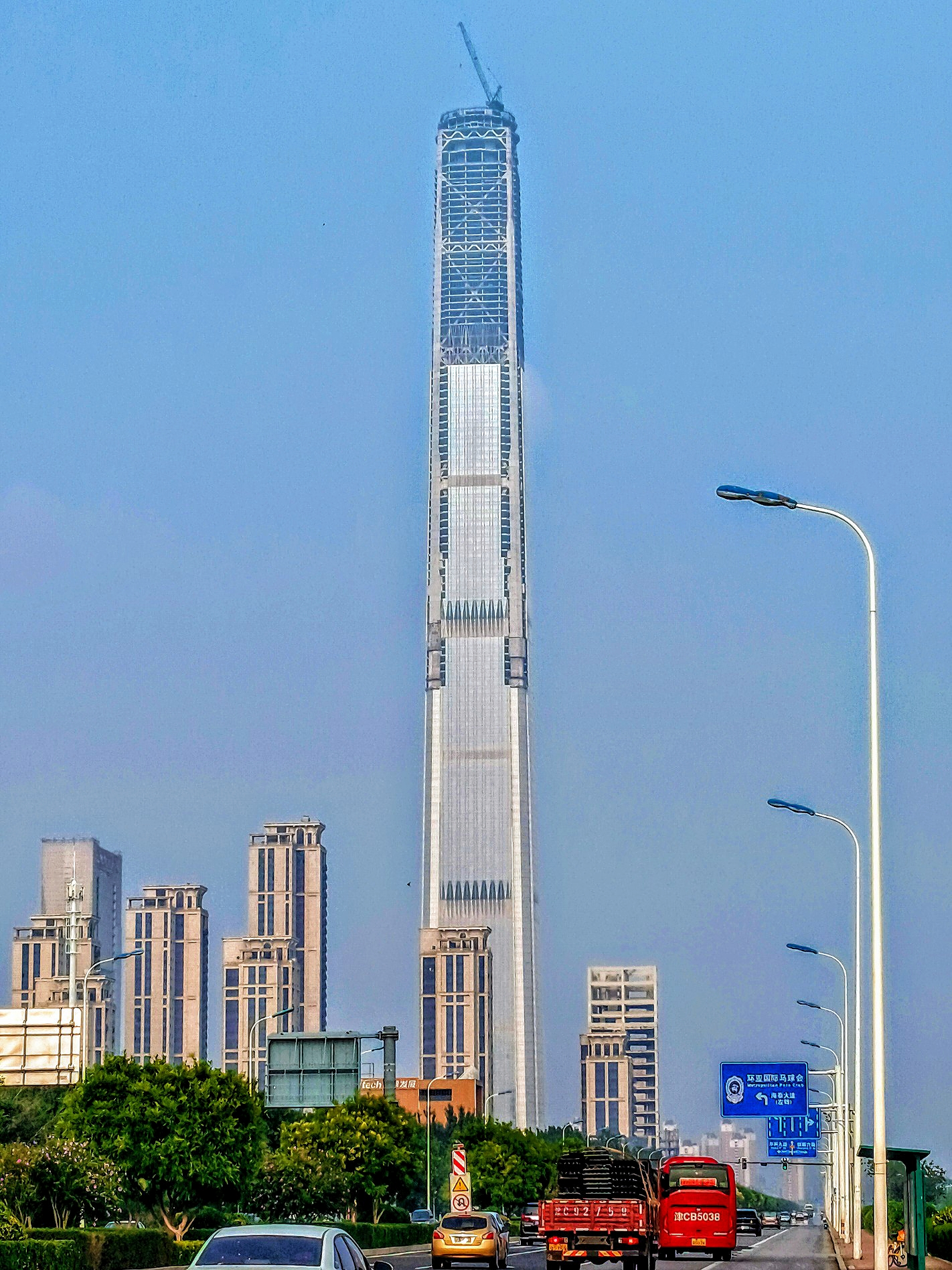
Tianxin Huachuang 117 Tower viewed from Jinjing Highway

On 20 March, the China National Offshore Oil Corporation (CNOOC) formally signed an agreement to purchase several floors of the main tower of the "117 Project".

On 28 March, CITIC Group signed an agreement to purchase several floors of the main tower of the "117 Project".

On 30 March, sixteen companies, including Lenovo, China Communications Construction Company, Rongcheng Group, Qihoo 360, China Merchants Expressway, Yunzhanghu, DiDi, and Full Truck Alliance, signed agreements to purchase office space in the main tower of the "117 Project".

On 24 April, six central state-owned enterprises, including Guodian Power Development Company of the China Energy Investment Corporation and Global Medical Services of Genertec, signed agreements to purchase office space in commercial and office buildings associated with the "117 Project".

== Design ==
Goldin Finance 117 is designed to resemble a walking stick, and has that as its nickname. Earlier designs resembled the shape of a fin and a diamond. Goldin Finance 117 is planned to be the main tower of Tianjin Goldin Metropolitan, a Central Business District funded by Goldin Properties, and would be built nearby the Tianjin Goldin Metropolitan Polo Club.

== Urban exploration ==
In 2015, two Russian and Chinese urban explorers climbed the tower and the construction crane.

In 2016, Russian couple Ivan Beerkus (Kuznetsov) and Angela Nikolau climbed the under-construction tower. Their video received over 922,000 views as of April 2023 and attracted worldwide media attention.

== See also ==
- List of tallest buildings in China
- Other skyscrapers on hold in China
  - Evergrande Hefei Center T1
  - Dalian Greenland Center
  - Suzhou Zhongnan Center
- Ryugyong Hotel, previous record holder
