= 1994 Foshan F.C. season =

Foshan F.C. 1994
- Manager: Wang Hangqin (王航勤)
- Stadium: New Plaza Stadium, Foshan
- Jia-B League: 4th

The 1994 season is the 6th year in Foshan Football Club's existence, their first season in the professional football league.

== Coaching staff ==
Position	Staff
Head coach	(China) Wang Hangqin (王航勤)
Assistant coaches	(China) Wu Yaqi (吴亚七)
Assistant coaches	(China) Huang Guoxiong (黄国雄)
Team doctor	(China) Chen Bao'an (陈宝安)

== Squad ==
Note: Flags indicate national team as defined under FIFA eligibility rules; some limited exceptions apply. Players may hold more than one non-FIFA nationality.

No.	Pos.	Nation	Player
2	DF	(China) CHN	Zhang Yuehui
3	DF	(China) CHN	Yan Jianwei
4	DF	(China) CHN	Le Jingzhong
5	DF	(China) CHN	Wang Xueyuan
6	FW	(Scotland) SCO	Macmahon (from July)
7	DF	(China) CHN	Wu Zhendong
8	MF	(China) CHN	Wu Zhongjun
9	FW	(China) CHN	Gu Xingxiang
10	FW		Roger John (from July)

No.	Pos.	Nation	Player
11	MF	(China) CHN	Zhang Lei
14	FW	(China) CHN	Ma Zhiqiang
15	FW	(China) CHN	Li Kefeng
16	MF	(China) CHN	Zhang Weiqiu
17	MF	(China) CHN	Liu Yan
18	FW	(England) ENG	Roger Eli (from July)
20	DF	(China) CHN	Jing Yuewu
22	GK	(China) CHN	Yang Xiaolei
23	GK	(China) CHN	Li Xianzhong

== Training matches and friendlies ==
13 April 1994	Foshan	1 - 1 (2 – 4 p)	Liaoning	Foshan, Guangdong
	Zhang Weiqiu 72'			Stadium: New Plaza Stadium

16 October 1994	(Hong Kong) Kitchee	2 - 2	(China) Foshan	Kwai Tsing, Hong Kong
	? 12' ? 32'		Gu Xingxiang 68', 83'

== Competitions ==
Win Draw Loss

=== Chinese Jia-B League ===
==== Results summary ====
Overall								Home						Away					
Pld	W	D	L	GF	GA	GD	Pts	W	D	L	GF	GA	GD	W	D	L	GF	GA	GD
20	8	9	3	31	23	+8	33	4	5	1	19	10	+9	4	4	2	12	13	−1

==== League Matches ====
17 April 1994 1	Foshan	3 - 1	Hunan Jinxiang	Foshan, Guangdong
	Liu Yan 24'; Wu Zhongjun 72' (pen.); Gu Xingxiang 77'		? ?'	Stadium: New Plaza Stadium

24 April 1994 2	Foshan	6 - 1	Hubei Wugang B	Foshan, Guangdong
	Jing Yaowu 9', 33'; Gu Xingxiang 70', 83'; Wu Zhongjun 82', 87'		? ?'	Stadium: New Plaza Stadium

1 May 1994 3	Tianjin B	3 - 0	Foshan	Tianjin

8 May 1994 4	Henan Jianye	3 - 0	Foshan	Zhengzhou, Henan
				Stadium: Henan Provincial Stadium

5 June 1994 5	Foshan	1 - 2	Guangxi Huahai	Foshan, Guangdong
	Gu Xingxiang 90+'			Stadium: New Plaza Stadium

19 June 1994 7	Foshan	1 - 1	Guangzhou B	Foshan, Guangdong
	Gu Xingxiang 10'			Stadium: New Plaza Stadium

26 June 1994 8	Qingdao Hainiu	0 - 1	Foshan	Qingdao, Shandong
			Gu Xingxiang 63'	Stadium: Qingdao Tiantai Stadium

3 July 1994 9	Tianjin	0 - 0	Foshan	Tianjin
				Stadium: Minyuan Stadium

10 July 1994 10	Foshan	2 - 2	Locomotive	Foshan, Guangdong
	Gu Xingxiang 25', 55'			Stadium: New Plaza Stadium

17 July 1994 11	Hubei Wugang	1 - 1	Foshan	Wuhan, Hubei
			Gu Xingxiang 75'

24 July 1994 12	Hunan Jinxiang	2 - 4	Foshan	Hunan
			John 22'; Le Jingzhong 54'; Wu Zhongjun 63'; Gu Xingxiang 89'

31 July 1994 13	Hubei Wugang B	1 - 2	Foshan	Wuhan, Hubei
			Le Jingzhong 42'; Wu Zhongjun 71'

7 August 1994 14	Foshan	3 - 1	Tianjin B	Foshan, Guangdong
			Macmahon 5', 51'; Gu Xingxiang 33'	Stadium: New Plaza Stadium

14 August 1994 15	Foshan	1 - 0	Henan Jianye	Foshan, Guangdong
			Gu Xingxiang 65'	Stadium: New Plaza Stadium

21 August 1994 16	Guangxi Huahai	1 - 2	Foshan	Guangxi
			Gu Xingxiang 38'; John 87'

3 September 1994 18	Guangzhou B	1 - 1	Foshan	Guangzhou, Guangdong
	Li Zifei 38'		Gu Xingxiang 4'	Stadium: Yuexiushan Stadium

23 October 1994 19	Foshan	1 - 1	Qingdao Hainiu	Foshan, Guangdong
	John 70'			Stadium: New Plaza Stadium

30 October 1994 20	Foshan	0 - 0	Tianjin	Foshan, Guangdong
				Stadium: New Plaza Stadium

6 November 1994 21	Locomotive	1 - 1	Foshan	Tianjin
			Gu Xingxiang 30' (pen.)

13 November 1994 22	Foshan	1 - 1	Hubei Wugang	Foshan, Guangdong
	Liu Yan 28'			Stadium: New Plaza Stadium
