= Langdon & Seah =

International construction consultancy firm in Asia

- Company type: Limited Liability Partnership
- Industry: Construction, civil engineering
- Founded: 1936
- Headquarters: Asia
- Key people: Kenneth Poon, CEO
- Products: Cost management; project and program management; and specialist consulting services
- Number of employees: 3,000

Langdon & Seah is an international construction consultancy firm in Asia, operating independently in 13 countries with 39 offices and a workforce of nearly 3,000.

== History ==
The firm has its roots traced to the quantity surveying practice in the United Kingdom of "Horace W Langdon & Every", founded in 1919, which had bought the Singaporean firm of "Waters & Watson" to form "Horace W Langdon & Every incorporating Waters & Watson" in 1946. "Waters & Watson" itself was established in 1933 but ceased operations when Japan invaded Singapore in 1942. Following the Japanese surrender in 1945, original partner Eric Watson restarted "Waters & Watson" in early 1946, roping in young quantity surveyor Seah Mong Hee - joining "Waters & Watson" in 1936 - who helped maintained the office in the months prior to the Japanese invasion. The practice soon flourish and branch offices were soon established in Kuala Lumpur (1947) and Hong Kong (1949) encouraged by extensive post-war reconstruction work in the region.

Also in 1949, Seah Mong Hee – who had operated the office during the war – was made a Partner. The firm underwent further name changes to reflect changes in status, becoming "Langdon & Every (Far East)" in 1954. By 1967, the words "Far East" were dropped to reflect the firm's expansion beyond the region and the practice later became "Langdon Every & Seah" in 1969. In 1988, "Langdon & Every" in the United Kingdom and the Gulf countries amalgamated with "Davis, Belfield & Everest" (a firm formed in 1931 by Owen Davis joined in 1935 by John Belfield and in 1944 by Bobbie Everest) to become "Davis Langdon & Everest". Following the swapping of shares, "Langdon, Every & Seah" thus became "Davis Langdon & Seah" in 1990.

In April 2012, the group was acquired by Arcadis, an international consultancy, design, engineering and management services company.

On May 18, 2012, Davis Langdon & Seah officially changed its name to "Langdon & Seah".

== Services ==
The group offers consultancy services including the core services of cost management and quantity surveying, cost engineering, legal support, project management and monitoring, management consultancy, due diligence, research studies, insurance valuations, sustainable construction and capital tax allowances.

The group's work in the construction sector ranges from infrastructure works, retail, residential, industrial and commercial, as well as work in the oil and gas industry specifically by branch at Brunei.

== List of notable projects ==
The firm has worked on the following high-profile projects:

- Beijing International Airport, China
- Jin Mao Building, Shanghai, China
- World Expo 2010, Shanghai, China
- Goldin Financial Global Centre, Hong Kong
- Hong Kong Stadium, Hong Kong
- Hong Kong Disneyland, Hong Kong
- Industrial & Commercial Bank of China, Hong Kong
- Mandarin Oriental, Kuala Lumpur, Malaysia
- Suvarnabhumi International Airport, Bangkok, Thailand
- Central World, Bangkok, Thailand
- Bitexco Financial Tower, Ho Chi Minh City, Vietnam
- Zuellig Building, Philippines
- Resorts World at Sentosa, Singapore
- Marina Bay Sands, Singapore
- Gardens by the Bay, Singapore
