= Pan Sutong =

Hong Kong billionaire (born 1963)

Pan Sutong 潘蘇通 JP
- 潘蘇通
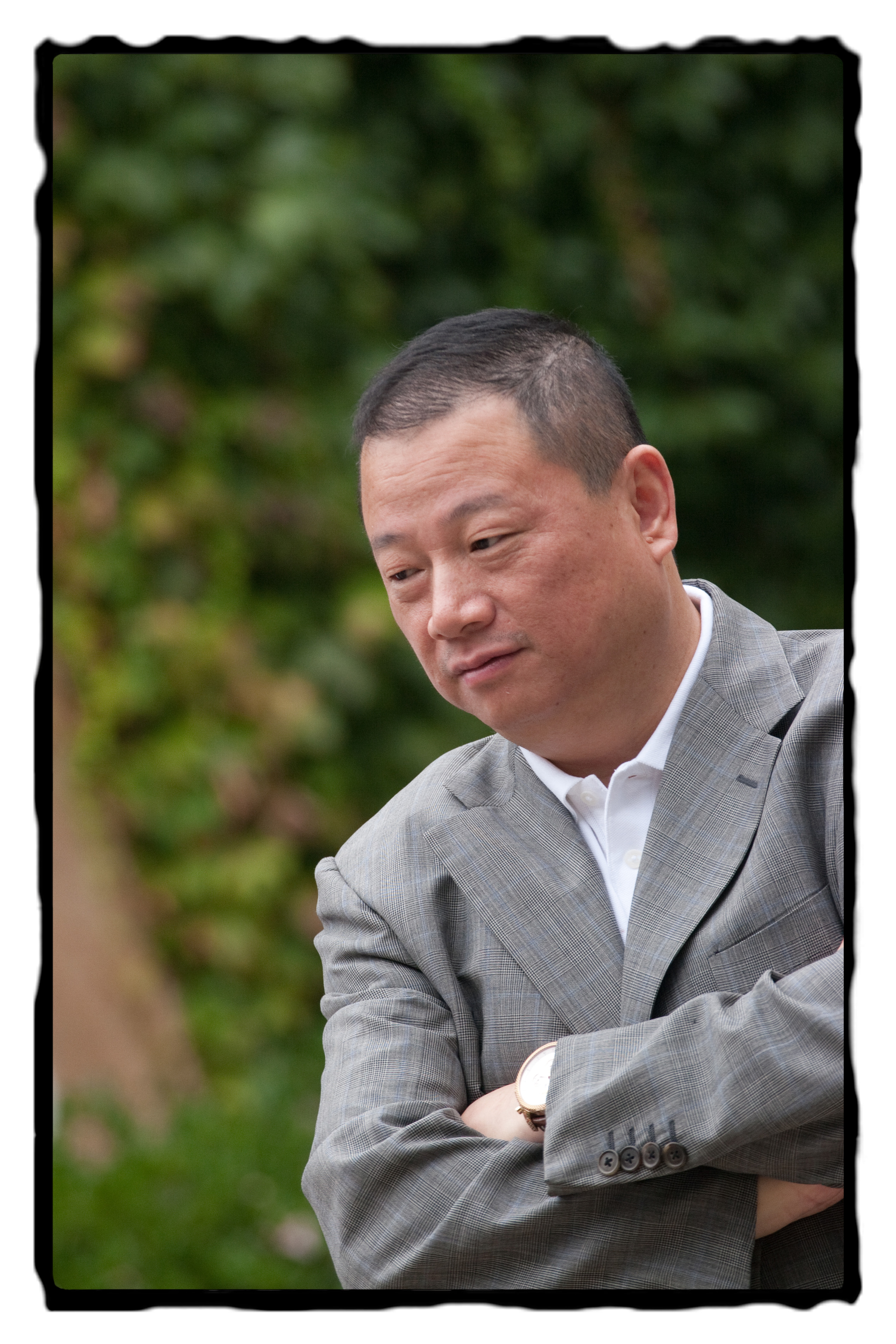
- Born: 1963 (age 62–63); Guangdong, China
- Citizenship: Chinese (Hong Kong)
- Occupation: Businessman
- Title: Chairman, Goldin Financial Holdings Limited
- Children: 1

Pan Sutong (born 1963) is a Hong Kong–based businessman and investor. He is the founder of Matsunichi Digital Holdings Limited, a company involved in consumer electronics. He is also the chairman and controlling shareholder of Goldin Financial Holdings Limited, a conglomerate with interests in real estate, financial services, and investment.

== Biography ==
Pan Sutong was born in Shaoguan, Guangdong, China, in 1963. In 1976, he emigrated to the United States. He moved to Hong Kong in 1984 and began trading electronics brands, including Panasonic. In 1993, he founded Matsunichi Color Display Monitor Company Limited, a home appliance manufacturer.

In June 2002, Pan acquired the Hong Kong–listed company Emperor Technology Venture Limited and renamed it Matsunichi Communication Holdings Limited. On 3 September 2008, the company was renamed Goldin Properties Holdings Limited. Later in 2008, he acquired Fortuna International Holdings Limited and renamed it Goldin Financial Holdings Limited.

Goldin Properties Holdings Limited was privatized through a cash offer, with the compulsory acquisition of all shares completed on 17 August 2017. The company's shares were subsequently withdrawn from the Hong Kong Stock Exchange on 18 August 2017.

Goldin Group includes Goldin Properties Holdings Limited, Goldin Financial Holdings Limited, Goldin Equities Limited, and Matsunichi Digital Holdings Limited. Goldin Financial Holdings Limited is listed on the Main Board of the Hong Kong Stock Exchange under the stock code 00530.

In 2018, Pan was elected as a member of the 13th National Committee of the Chinese People's Political Consultative Conference.

He received an honorary doctorate in business administration from Lingnan University in November 2018.

In December 2021, FactWire reported that Pan was eligible to vote multiple times in the 2021 Hong Kong legislative election under different functional constituencies, giving him voting power substantially greater than that of an ordinary elector.

=== Business career ===
Pan Sutong is the controlling shareholder and chairman of Goldin Financial Holdings Limited. He also holds leadership roles at Goldin Properties Holdings Limited, including controlling shareholder and chairman of the board.

According to Forbes, Pan was ranked 365th on the 2019 World Billionaires list with an estimated net worth of US$4.9 billion.

He is chairman of the Hong Kong Polo Development and Promotion Federation (HKPDPF) and vice president of the Federation of International Polo (FIP).

In 2015, Pan donated funds to Lingnan University to establish the Pan Sutong Shanghai–Hong Kong Economic Policy Research Centre, which conducts research on economic and financial development in Mainland China and Hong Kong.

In 2017, Pan, Peter Lam Kin-Ngok, Cheng Cheung-ling, and Chanchai Ruayrungruang jointly founded the Belt and Road General Chamber of Commerce.

Moreover, he also owned a professional football club, Guangzhou Matsunichi F.C., between 1995 and 2000.

=== Wine ===
In 2011, Goldin Group purchased the 40-acre Sloan Estate winery in Napa Valley, California, from Stuart Sloan. The estate cultivates Cabernet Sauvignon, Merlot, Petit Verdot, and Cabernet Franc, producing wines under the labels Sloan and Asterisk.

In May 2013, Goldin Group acquired three additional châteaux in Bordeaux, France: Château Le Bon Pasteur in Pomerol, Château Rolland-Maillet in Saint-Émilion, and Château Bertineau St-Vincent in Lalande-de-Pomerol. Château Le Bon Pasteur produces Pomerol AOC Bordeaux wine and has been associated with Michel Rolland, a long-term consultant of Goldin Financials who facilitated the acquisition.

=== Polo ===
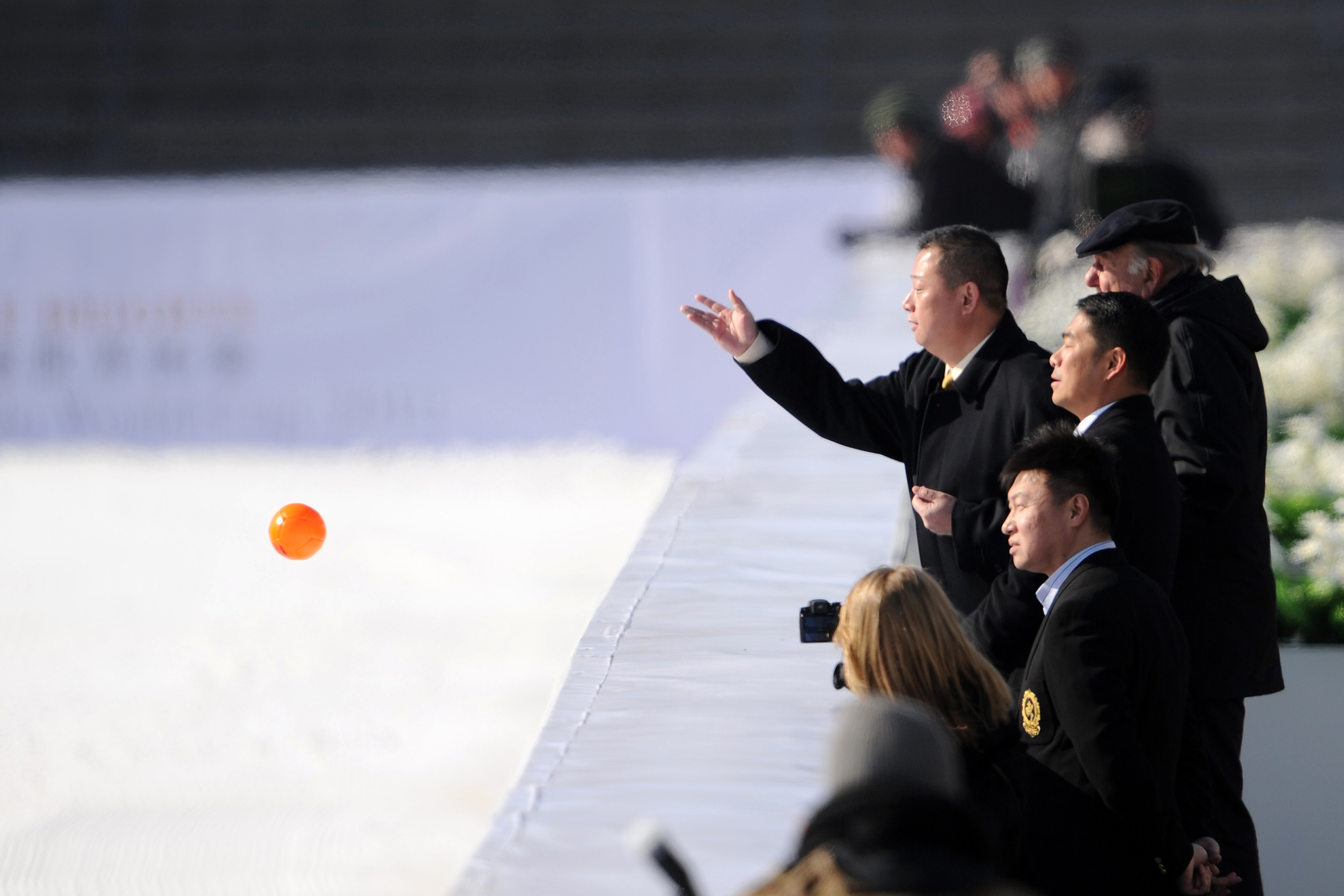
Pan Sutong threw the ceremonial first ball at the Fortune Heights Snow Polo World Cup 2013

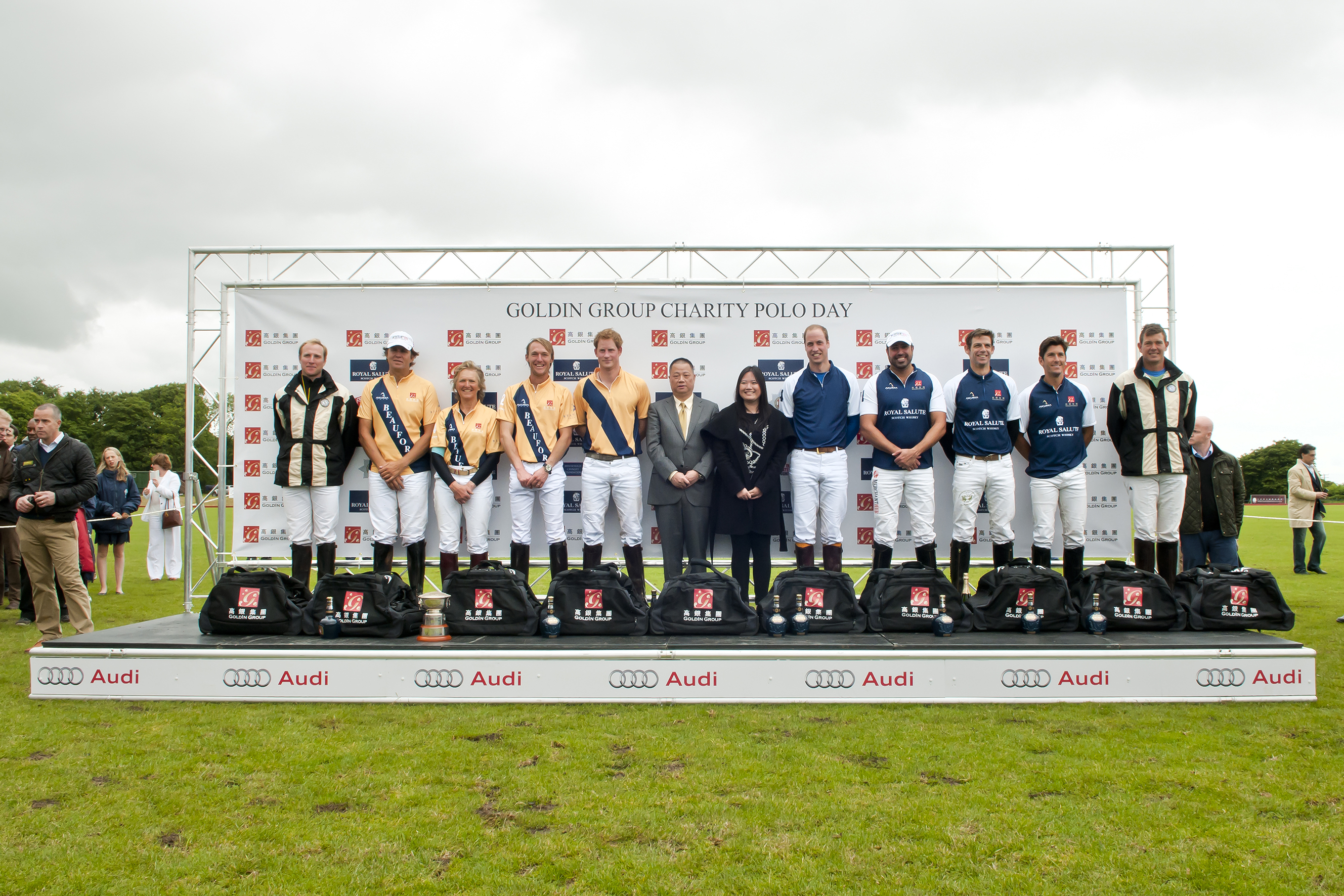
Group picture taken in Goldin Group Charity Day held in Beaufort Polo Club with Prince William and Prince Harry's teams

Pan Sutong is the chairman of the non-profit Hong Kong Polo Development and Promotion Federation. In December 2012, he was elected vice president of the Federation of International Polo at the FIP annual general meeting.

Tianjin Goldin Metropolitan Polo Club owned by Goldin Group, opened in November 2010. Since its opening, the club has hosted several international polo tournaments, including the Goldin International Snow Polo Challenge (2011), Goldin Cold Cup (2011), Goldin U18 Cup (2011), Fortune Heights Snow Polo World Cup (2012–2017), Fortune Heights Super Nations Cup (2012–2014), Maserati Metropolitan Polo Classic (2013–2014), and Metropolitan Intervarsity Polo (2013–2018).

Goldin Group also sponsored the Goldin Charity Day at Beaufort Polo Club in England from 2012 to 2015, which featured participation by Prince William and Prince Harry.

=== Horses ===
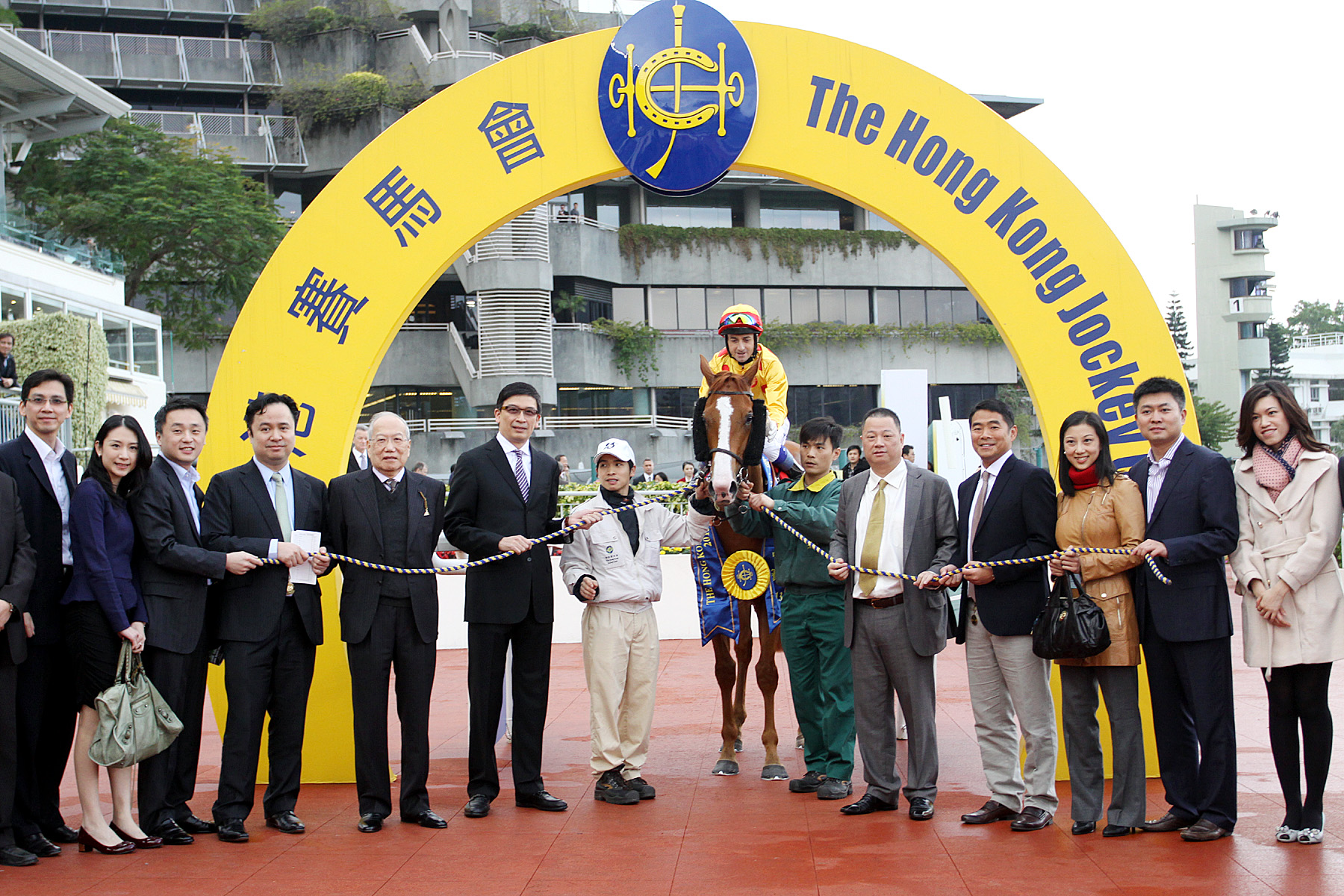
Gold-Fun crowned champion of Hong Kong Classic Mile 2013

Pan Sutong began participating in horse racing in Hong Kong in 2011 and purchased several thoroughbreds, including Tailwind, Gold-Fun, Akeed Mofeed, Giant Treasure, Obliterator, Consort, Gold Mount, and Gold Land.

Akeed Mofeed, sired by Dubawi, was reported to have been purchased for as much as 20 million Hong Kong dollars. The horse finished fourth in the Irish Derby 2012 and won the BMW Hong Kong Derby 2013. Akeed Mofeed was the runner-up in the G2 Longines Jockey Club Cup at Sha Tin Racecourse in November 2013 and won the G1 LONGINES Hong Kong Cup in December 2013. Akeed Mofeed retired from racing on 6 June 2014 and now stands as a stallion at Goldin Farms, Lindsay Park in South Australia.

Gold-Fun, sired by Le Vie Dei Colori, was the champion of the Hong Kong Classic Mile 2013 and placed second runner-up in the BMW Hong Kong Derby 2013. Gold-Fun also won the National Day Cup in October 2013, the G2 BOCHK Wealth Management Jockey Club Mile in November 2013, and the HKG1 Queen's Silver Jubilee Cup in March 2014. He continued to compete in major races, including the Celebration Cup in October 2014 and the Chairman's Sprint Prize. in February 2015.

Giant Treasure won his first Group 1 race at the Stewards' Cup (1600m) in January 2016.

In September 2013, Goldin Australia Pty Ltd, a subsidiary of Goldin Group, acquired Lindsay Park Stud in Barossa Valley, South Australia, a 1,257.5-acre horse breeding and training facility. In March 2018, Gold Mount won the Class 1 Happy Valley Vase Handicap (1800m).

=== Celebrity ===
In 2005, Matsunichi, a company founded by Pan Sutong, appointed Olympic gold medalist Michael Phelps as a spokesperson for its MP3 player products.

=== Personal life ===
Pan Sutong is married and has one child.
