= The Bay Hub =

Office building in Hong Kong

- 太豐匯
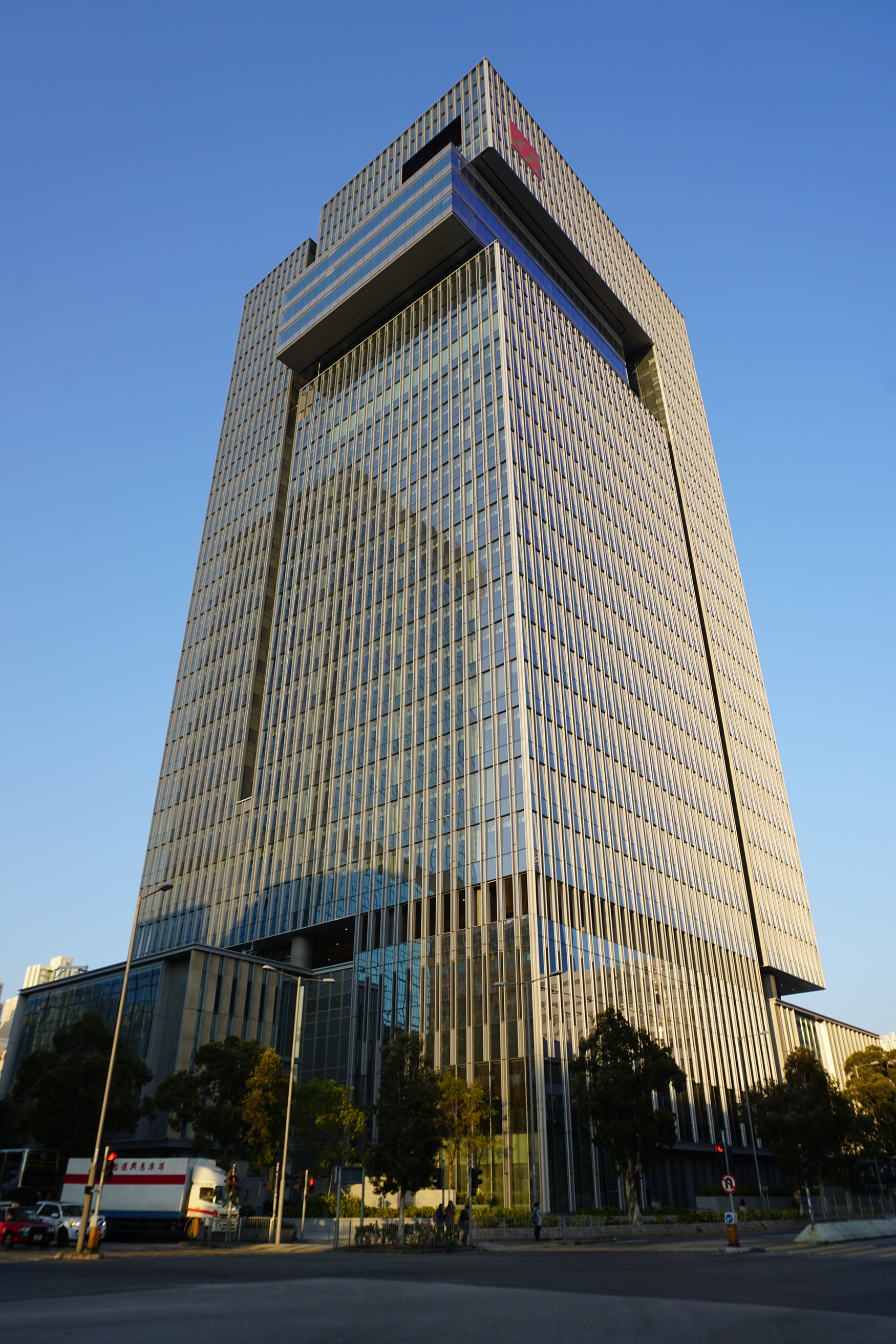
- The Bay Hub in Kowloon Bay, Hong Kong.
- Interactive map of the The Bay Hub area

General information
- Location: 17 Kai Cheung Road, Kowloon Bay, Kwun Tong District, Hong Kong
- Coordinates: 22.32574°N 114.20628°E
- Groundbreaking: 2014
- Completed: 2016
- Opened: October 2016
- Client: Smart Edge Limited; Goldin Properties Group

Height
- Height: 150 m (490 ft)

Technical details
- Floor count: 27
- Floor area: 79,200 m2 / 852,000 ft2
- Lifts/elevators: Passenger lifts: 18; Service lifts: 2 VIP lift: 1 Escalators: 4 Car park passenger lifts: 2

Design and construction
- Architect: Kohn Pedersen Fox Associates PC
- Architecture firm: Ronald Lu & Partners (Associate Architect)
- Structural engineer: Ove Arup & Partners Hong Kong Limited
- Quantity surveyor: Langdon & Seah Hong Kong Limited
- Main contractor: Hip Hing Construction Company Limited
- Awards: Silver Award for "Best Innovative Green Building" (MIPIM Asia Awards 2017); Platinum level of certifications by Leadership in Energy and Environmental Design (LEED) and BEAM Plus

Website
- https://thebayhub.com https://www.mapletree.com.sg/cn/All-Properties/MIPL/Hong-Kong/The%20Bay%20Hub.aspx

The Bay Hub (Chinese: 太豐匯) is an office building in Kowloon Bay, Hong Kong. It was formerly named the Goldin Financial Global Centre (高銀金融環球中心).

== History ==
The building was built on a parcel that had been acquired by Goldin Group for HK$3.43 billion.

In April 2019, Mirae Asset Daewoo invested US$243 million in mezzanine debt for Goldin Financial Global Centre.

The private equity fund PAG and Mapletree Investments jointly acquired the building from the liquidator in January 2023 with a 50/50 holding ratio for a total consideration of HK$5.6 billion. The project was renamed The Bay Hub in early 2024, where the character 太 and 豐 come from the Chinese name of the two companies (太盟投資集團 and 豐樹產業).

== See also ==
- Mapletree Investments
- PAG
