= Zhong Qirong =

Chinese judge

- 鍾期榮
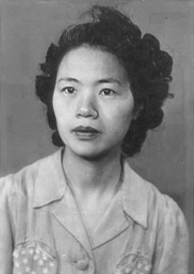

1st President of Hong Kong Shue Yan University
- In office 1971-09-20 – 2014-03-02
- Preceded by: Office created
- Succeeded by: Henry Hu Doctor

Personal details
- Born: 29 July 1920 Changsha County, Hunan, China
- Died: 2 March 2014 (aged 93) Ruttonjee Hospital, Wan Chai, Hong Kong
- Spouse: Henry Hu (m. 1945; survived 2014)
- Children: Elder son: Hu Yao-su Younger son: Hu Huai-zhong
- Education: Changsha Private Youyou School Provincial Changsha Girls' High School Hunan Private Zhounan Girls' High School LL.B., [Wuhan University] Ph.D. in Law, [University of Paris]

Zhong Qirong GBS (Chinese: 鍾期榮; 29 July 1920 – 2 March 2014), also rendered Chung Chi Yung and Chung Chi-wing, was a Chinese educator. Together with her husband, Hu Hung-lick, she co-founded Hong Kong Shue Yan University and served as its president.

On 2 March 2014, Zhong Qirong died at Ruttonjee Hospital in Hong Kong at the age of 93. She was laid to rest at the Cape Collinson Chinese Permanent Cemetery.

== Biography ==
Zhong was born in Changsha County, Hunan Province, China. She attended Changsha Private Youyou School (now Youyou School in Tianxin District, Changsha), the Provincial Daotian Middle School, and Zhounan Private Girls’ School in Hunan. In 1944, she graduated from the Law Department of Wuhan University and later went on to pursue further studies in France, where she earned a doctorate in law from the University of Paris. She was recognized as the first female judge in China. In 1956, Chung settled in Hong Kong.

After returning to Hong Kong, Zhong Qirong began teaching at Hong Kong Baptist College. In 1971, she and her husband, Hu Hung-lick, noticed a serious shortage of local higher education opportunities. Initially, Zhong intended to open a kindergarten, but recognizing her deeper aspiration to contribute to education, Hu made the decisive choice to establish a degree-granting institution instead. They converted their residence in Happy Valley into a college. Zhong became the founding president, while Hu served as supervisor.

Zhong Qirong was deeply involved in the college’s administration, personally overseeing everything from hiring faculty members to conducting student admission interviews. According to former students, Zhong and her husband Hu Hung-lick would greet students at the school gate every morning, regardless of weather conditions. After the turn of the millennium, when the Hong Kong Council for Accreditation of Academic and Vocational Qualifications began reviewing the college’s programs, Zhong worked tirelessly to secure official recognition for the institution. In 2000, she was awarded the Gold Bauhinia Star by the Hong Kong SAR Government in recognition of her outstanding contributions to education.

In 2001, while the couple was having dinner in the school cafeteria, Chung suddenly suffered a stroke. After the stroke, Chung Chi-wing's physical condition deteriorated significantly and he had to use a wheelchair to get around. To facilitate school affairs, the couple moved to the school dormitory, and Chung Chi-wing often practiced walking on campus with the help of a caregiver.

In 2007, Canadian amateur astronomer Yang Guangyu named an asteroid, “34779 Zhong Qirong,” discovered in 2001, in her honor.

On 2 March 2014, Zhong Qirong died peacefully at Ruttonjee Hospital in Hong Kong at the age of 93. The news of her death was first reported by the Journalism and Communication Department’s website “Speak Online” at Hong Kong Shue Yan University. She began feeling unwell on the evening of March 1 while at the university dormitory, and was later taken to Ruttonjee Hospital, where she died around 5 a.m. with her family by her side. Her funeral was held on the afternoon of 25 March at 5 p.m. at the Hong Kong Funeral Home, with the burial taking place the following morning at 10 a.m. A public memorial service was held on 29 March from 10 a.m. to 6 p.m. at Hong Kong Shue Yan University.

== Honors and awards ==
- First Class of Distinguished Alumni, Wuhan University (1997)
- Gold Bauhinia Star (2000)
- Honorary Doctor of Letters, Hong Kong Metropolitan University(2001)
- Honorary Doctor of Social Science, City University of Hong Kong (2004)
- One of the “Touching China Annual Person of the Year Award” (2007)
- Honorary Doctor of Social Science, The Hong Kong Polytechnic University (2007)
- Honorary Doctor of Education, The Hong Kong Institute of Education (2007)
