= Wang Tao (footballer, born 1970) =

Chinese footballer (1970–2022)

Wang Tao 王涛
Personal information
- Date of birth: 22 April 1970
- Place of birth: Dalian, Liaoning, China
- Date of death: 4 November 2022 (aged 52)
- Place of death: Hangzhou, Zhejiang, China
- Height: 1.94 m (6 ft 4 in)
- Position: Striker

Youth career
- 1986–1989: Dalian Youth

Senior career*
Years	Team	Apps	(Gls)
1989–1993	Dalian team		
1994–1999	Dalian Wanda	126	(57)
2000–2001	→ Beijing Guoan (loan)	40	(23)
2002	Beijing Guoan	14	(2)

International career
1997–2000	China	2	(0)
Medal record
Men's football
Representing China
Asian Games
Silver medal – second place	1994 Hiroshima	Football
- * Club domestic league appearances and goals

Wang Tao (Simplified Chinese: 王涛; 22 April 1970 – 4 November 2022) was a Chinese professional footballer who played as a striker. He made two appearances for the China national team. After his retirement he helped establish the newly formed Beijing Baxy football team and would become their chairman until he left in 2011.

== Biography ==
Wang Tao was a highly prolific striker who rose to prominence with Dalian Wanda FC during the period when the Chinese league moved towards full professionalism. Benefiting from the professional league system Wang Tao became a highly prolific striker and aided the team to win the 1994 league title, while personally coming second in the top goal scorers chart. This led to several further titles and Dalian becoming the dominant team within the league, however, while he saw his teammates quickly establish themselves within the national team Wang Tao would have to wait until a friendly against USA on 29 January 1997 in a 2–1 victory before he was given his chance to make an impact at the international stage. Wang Tao would, however, only make one further international appearance despite his consistent goalscoring form until the 2000 league season saw his teammate Wang Peng take over from him at Dalian and Chinese football teams. Wang Tao would then join Beijing Guoan where he ended his football career.

Wang died on 4 November 2022, at the age of 52.

== Honours ==
Dalian Wanda FC

- Chinese Jia-A League: 1994, 1996, 1997, 1998
- Chinese Super Cup: 1997
