= Nanhai District Stadium =

Sports venue in Foshan, China

Coordinates: 23°02′39″N 113°08′11″E

Nanhai District Stadium (Chinese: 南海区体育场) is a multi-use stadium in Foshan, China. It is currently used mostly for football matches and athletics events. This stadium's capacity is 8,000 people and was built in 1989.
