= Park Ji-ho =

South Korean footballer (born 1970)

Park Ji-ho 박지호
Personal information
- Date of birth: 4 July 1970 (age 56)
- Place of birth: South Korea
- Height: 1.80 m (5 ft 11 in)
- Position: Defender

Youth career
- –1992: Daegu University

Senior career*
Years	Team	Apps	(Gls)
1993–1994	LG Cheetahs	26	(0)
1995–1997	Pohang Steelers	35	(6)
1998	Guangzhou Apollo	20	(5)
1999	Cheonan Ilhwa Chunma	5	(0)
Total		90	(11)

International career
1993	South Korea	2	(0)

Managerial career
- 2003: Hannam University
- 2007: Kyunghee High School
- 2008: Daekyo Kangaroos WFC
- 2015–: Hanlyo University
- * Club domestic league appearances and goals

- Park Ji-ho
- Hangul: 박지호
- Hanja: 朴志鎬
- RR: Bak Jiho
- MR: Pak Chiho

Park Ji-Ho (born 4 July 1970) is a retired South Korean football player.

== Club career ==
He used to play for Daegu University, LG Cheetahs, Pohang Steelers, Guangzhou Apollo (China) and Ilhwa Chunma. On 9 March 1997, he scored the golden goal for Pohang against Ilhwa Chunma in the 1996–97 Asian Club Championship final.

== Honours ==
=== Club ===
==== LG Cheetahs ====
- K-League Runner-up(1):1993
- K-League Cup Runner-up(1):1994

==== Pohang Steelers ====
- K-League Runners-up(1):1995
- FA Cup Champions(1):1996
- K-League Cup Runners-up(1):1997
- AFC Champions League Champions(1):1997
- Asian Super Cup Runners-up(1):1997

==== Cheonan Ilhwa Chunma ====
- FA Cup Champions(1): 1999
