= Goldin Financial Holdings Ltd. =

Company

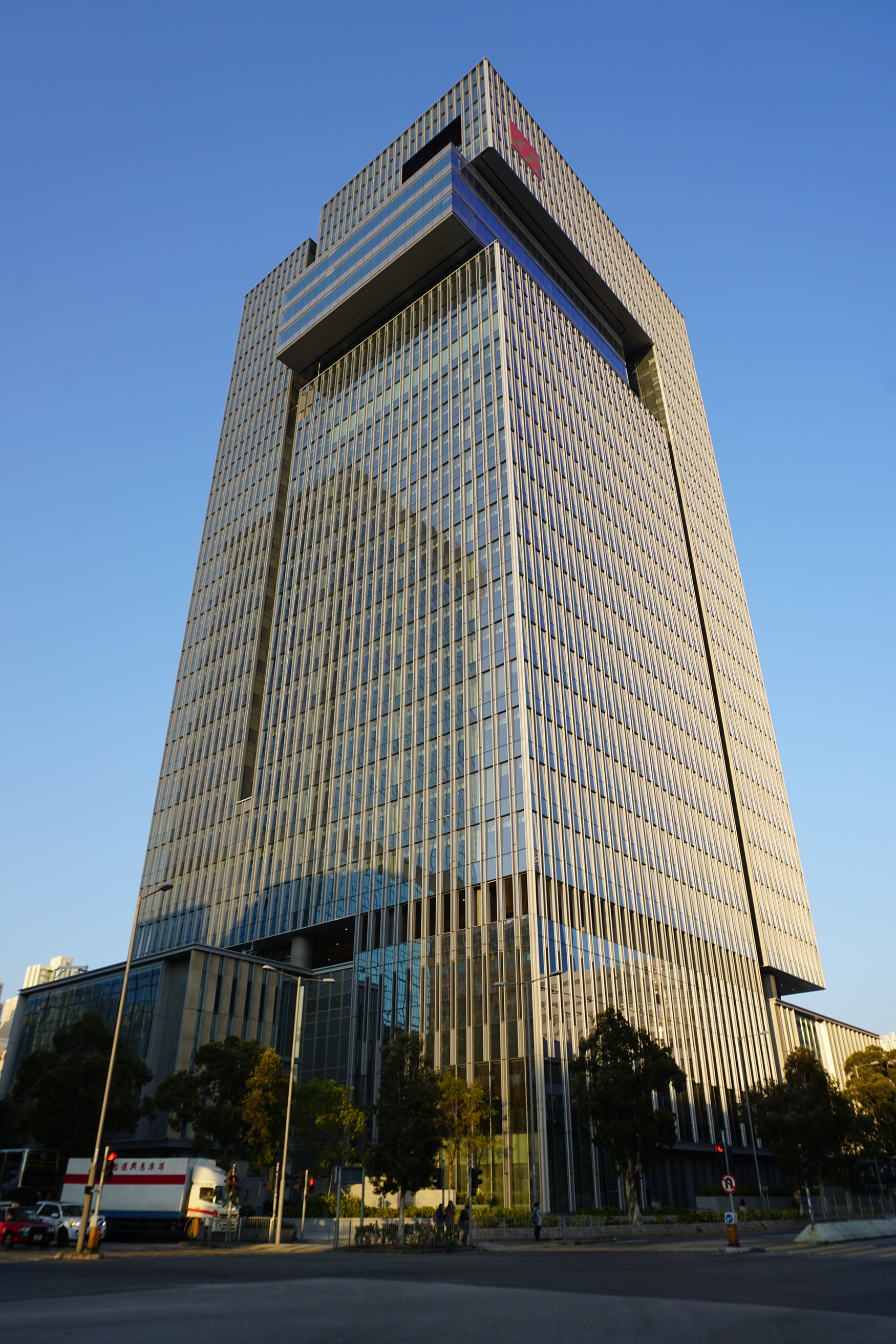
Goldin Financial Global Centre in Kowloon Bay, Hong Kong.

Goldin Financial Holdings Ltd. (Chinese: 高銀金融（集團）有限公司 (SEHK: 530) is an investment holding company based in Hong Kong.

Pan Sutong is a controlling shareholder, the Chairman of the Board and an executive Director of the company.

In 2019, the company sold a plot of undeveloped residential real estate at a loss of approximately $335 million, seeking to reduce its debt.

== See also ==
- List of companies listed on the Hong Kong Stock Exchange
- Goldin Financial Global Centre
