= Wang Lei (footballer) =

Chinese association football player

Personal information
- Date of birth: 24 January 1995 (age 31)
- Place of birth: Jiamusi, China
- Height: 1.90 m (6 ft 3 in)
- Position: Defender

Team information
- Current team: Zhuhai Qin'ao

Youth career
- Dalian Shide

Senior career*
Years	Team	Apps	(Gls)
2014	Chengdu Qbao	1	(0)
2015–2016	Shanghai JuJu Sports	12	(0)
2017	Temnic 1924	0	(0)
2017–2018	Mladost Lučani	0	(0)
2018–2021	Guizhou Hengfeng	5	(1)
2022-	Zhuhai Qin'ao	0	(0)
- * Club domestic league appearances and goals as of 13:54, 5 May 2022 (UTC)

Wang Lei (Chinese: 王雷; pinyin: Wáng Léi; born 24 January 1995) is a Chinese footballer who currently plays for Chinese club Zhuhai Qin'ao.

== Club career ==
Wang Lei would start his professional career with lower league side Chengdu Qbao and Shanghai JuJu Sports. He would move abroad to Serbia where he played for Temnic 1924 and Mladost Lučani. He would return to China to join Guizhou Hengfeng where he initially joined their reserve team. He would make his competitive debut for the club in a league game on 27 April 2019 against Heilongjiang Lava Spring F.C. where he came on as a substitute in a 2–1 defeat.

== Career statistics ==
As of 31 December 2020.

Appearances and goals by club, season and competition
Club	Season	League			National Cup		Continental		Other		Total	
Club	Season	Division	Apps	Goals	Apps	Goals	Apps	Goals	Apps	Goals	Apps	Goals
Chengdu Qbao	2014	China League Two	1	0	0	0	–		0	0	1	0
Shanghai JuJu Sports	2015	China League Two	3	0	0	0	–		0	0	3	0
Shanghai JuJu Sports	2016	China League Two	9	0	2	0	–		1 (Note: Appearances in the China League Two Play-offs)	0	12	0
Shanghai JuJu Sports	Total		12	0	2	0	0	0	1	0	15	0
Temnic 1924	2016–17	Serbian First League	0	0	0	0	–		0	0	0	0
Mladost Lučani	2017–18	Serbian SuperLiga	0	0	1	0	–		0	0	1	0
Guizhou Hengfeng	2018	Chinese Super League	0	0	0	0	–		0	0	0	0
Guizhou Hengfeng	2019	China League One	1	0	1	0	–		0	0	2	0
Guizhou Hengfeng	Total		1	0	1	0	0	0	0	0	2	0
Career total			14	0	4	0	0	0	1	0	19	0
