= Xu Genbao =

Chinese footballer and manager

Xu Genbao 徐根宝
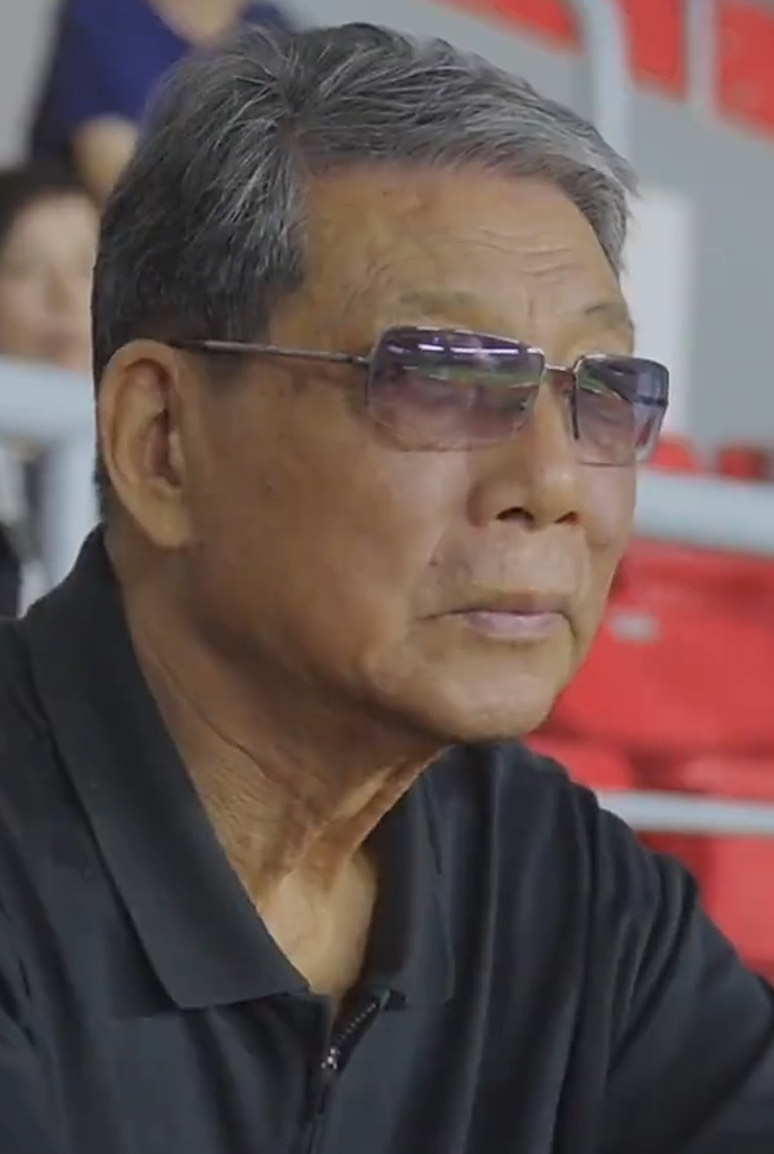

Personal information
- Full name: Xu Genbao
- Date of birth: January 26, 1944 (age 82)
- Place of birth: Shanghai, China
- Height: 1.78 m (5 ft 10 in)
- Position: Left-back

Senior career*
Years	Team	Apps	(Gls)
1961–1965	Nanjing Army Football Team		
1965–1975	Bayi Football Team		

International career
1966–1975	China	4	(0)

Managerial career
- 1978–1979: Shanxi Provincial Football Team
- 1980–1981: Huochetou Football Association
- 1982: Yunnan Provincial Football Team
- 1987–1990: China B in Jia A
- 1991: China U-23
- 1992–1993: China
- 1994–1996: Shanghai Shenhua
- 1997: Guangzhou Matsunichi
- 1998–1999: Dalian Wanda
- 2000–: Genbao Football Academy
- 2001: Shanghai COSCO Huili
- 2002: Shanghai Shenhua
- 2006–2014: Shanghai East Asia (as General Coach)
- * Club domestic league appearances and goals

Xu Genbao (simplified Chinese: 徐根宝; traditional Chinese: 徐根寶; pinyin: Xú Gēnbǎo; born January 16, 1944, in Shanghai) is a Chinese football manager and a former international football player. He is the current founder, chairman and general coach of Shanghai East Asia football club as well as also being the owner of the Genbao Football Academy. Though he was a Chinese international footballer, it was not until he became a manager and won the Chinese Jia-A League title with the China B team that he started to gain attention within Chinese football. This early success led to a Chinese national team appointment and then successful spells at Shanghai Shenhua and Dalian Wanda.

== Playing career ==
Predominately a left back throughout his career, Xu mainly played for Nanjing Army Football Team and Bayi Football Team. The Chinese Cultural Revolution saw his career severely shortened, but when it ended he was able to resume his career and help win the league title for Bayi in 1974. He was even able to play for the Chinese football team in its successful qualification for the 1976 AFC Asian Cup.

== Management career ==
=== Early management career ===
After he retired he was given the opportunity to manage second-tier club Shanxi Provincial Football Team in 1978, but after two seasons he was unable to help the team win promotion. He then took a position with the Huochetou Football Association until third-tier club Yunnan Provincial Football Team offered him the manager position in the 1982 league; however, he was unable to lead them to promotion and left soon after.

=== China ===
When Xu Genbao left Yunnan he returned to his training to become a professional manager, which led to him take advanced courses at Beijing Sports Institute from 1984 to 1986. Upon finishing, he was given the opportunity to manage the newly formed China B team, which was essentially the Chinese youth team which was allowed to play in the league system. His time with them was extremely successful and he was even able to win the league title with them in the 1989 league season. Impressed with his leadership, the Chinese Football Association removed the team from the league and allowed him to take the team to play international tournaments. This led to him being offered the Chinese senior team position; however, his reign was extremely short when the Football Association decided it wanted a more experienced manager in Klaus Schlappner to lead the team to the 1992 AFC Asian Cup. Nevertheless, Xu Genbao stayed with the Chinese team as an assistant until 1993.

=== Shanghai Shenhua ===
With the Chinese Football Association demanding the entire league system be professional, Shanghai Shenhua wanted Xu Genbao to help them in their transition at the beginning of the 1994 league season. He quickly enforced more professional techniques and tactics as well as developing a team able to fight Dalian Wanda's dominance within the league. This paid off in the 1995 league season when Shanghai Shenhua convincingly won the league title for the first time in over 30 years. His personal desire to see better training techniques saw him found Shanghai 02, a youth football team designed to improve the football techniques of young Chinese players. However, the following season back at Shanghai Shenhua was difficult for him, and he was unable to replicate the success he had previously shown despite coming second within the league. Shanghai Shenhua parted ways with him and he joined second-tier club Guangzhou Matsunichi in the 1997 league season where he immediately made an impact by aiding them to a 4th-place finish and promotion to the top tier.

=== Dalian Wanda ===
When Dalian Wanda was looking for a replacement for the previously successful manager Chi Shangbin, they quickly turned to Xu Genbao despite him previously managing their title rivals. He seemed like an inspired choice when he quickly asserted himself within the team and won them another league title in his first season as well as coming runners-up in the 1997-98 Asian Club Championship. The following season, however saw Dalian's fortunes drastically fade when they struggled in the league and flirted with relegation, which saw Xu Genbao resigning at the end of the season.

=== Return to Shanghai ===
Xu Genbao returned to Shanghai with second-tier football team Shanghai COSCO Huili, where he led them to the league title and promotion by the 2001 league season. Shanghai Shenhua, which hadn't won the title since he left, wanted to bring him back hoping for him to replicate the success he previously had; he decided that this was the perfect opportunity to sell and incorporate his now adult and professional football team Shanghai 02 into the Shanghai Shenhua team. While most of the Shanghai 02 players had a season of playing third-tier football, his desire to immediately merge them into Shanghai Shenhua proved to be a disaster, and his temper did not bring out the best from his players. With Shenhua flirting with relegation, he was essentially sacked from his post as manager, with Wu Jingui taking over. Ironically, the following season Shanghai Shenhua won the league title using many of the players brought from the Shanghai 02 squad.

=== Shanghai East Asia ===
Xu Genbao moved away from management and founded a football school in 2001 called Genbao Football Academy, but after several years outside management he founded Shanghai East Asia in 2005 where he named himself the head coach; in 2009 he stepped back and allowed Jiang Bingyao to replace him while he remained chairman. He became impatient with Jiang Bingyao after the club spent several seasons still in the second tier and decided to become the head coach of the team once more at beginning of the 2011 league season.

== Club ownership ==
Xu Genbao established a football club Shanghai East Asia in cooperation with Shanghai East Asia Sports and Culture Center Co. Ltd on the basis of Genbao Football Academy in 2006. The club won promotion to China League One in 2008 and to Chinese Super League in 2013. He sold the club to Shanghai International Port Group for ¥ 200 million in November 2014. He kept the U-15 team and below of the football academy. In March 2018, he sold the U-19 team (born in 1999 and 2000) to his former club Shanghai Greenland Shenhua.

He acquired Spanish Segunda División B side La Hoya Lorca in July 2016 and changed its name to Lorca FC. On 27 May 2017, the club achieved promotion to Segunda División.

== Honours ==
=== Player ===
Bayi Football Team

- China National League (1): 1974

=== Manager ===
China B

- Chinese Jia-A League (1): 1989

Shanghai Shenhua

- Chinese Jia-A League (1): 1995
- Chinese FA Super Cup (2): 1995, 2001

Dalian Wanda

- Chinese Jia-A League (1): 1998

Shanghai COSCO Huili

- Chinese Jia-B League (1): 2001

Shanghai East Asia^{1}

- China League Two (1): 2007
- China League One (1): 2012

Shanghai Football Team

- Chinese National Games u20 (1): 2009
- Chinese National Games u18 (1): 2017

=== Individual ===
- Jia-A League Manager of the Year (2): 1995, 1998
- Chinese Golden Coach Award (1): 2017

^{1} As Coach General
