= Andrés Olivas =

Andrés Olivas may refer to:

- Andrés Olivas (footballer)
- Andrés Olivas (racewalker)
