= Zhabei Stadium =

Sports venue in Shanghai, China

Coordinates: 31°16′41″N 121°26′46″E

Zhabei Stadium (simplified Chinese: 闸北体育场; traditional Chinese: 閘北體育場; pinyin: Zháběi Tǐyùchǎng) is a multi-use stadium in Shanghai. It is currently used mostly for football matches and athletics events. The stadium has a capacity of 20,000 people with 16,000 seats and about 4,000 people in all standing place.
