= Foshan Fosti F.C. =

Chinese football club

Foshan Fosti 佛山佛斯弟
- Full name: Foshan Fosti F.C.
- Founded: 1988; 37 years ago (Semi-pro); 1994 (Professional)
- Dissolved: 1997; 28 years ago
- Ground: New Plaza Stadium, Foshan, China
- League: Chinese Jia-B League
- 1997: 8th

Foshan Fosti Football Club (Chinese: 佛山佛斯弟) was a Chinese football club, established on 1994. It was one of the earliest professional football clubs in China. The club was dissolved in 1997.

== Name changes ==
- 1988–1995 Foshan F.C. 佛山
- 1996–1997 Foshan Fosti F.C. 佛山佛斯弟

== Seasons ==
- 1994 Foshan F.C. season

== Honours ==
=== League ===
- Chinese Yi League

Champion (1): 1989

== All-time league rankings ==
| Year | Div | Pld | W | D | L | GF | GA | GD | Pts | Pos. | FA Cup | Stadium |
|---|---|---|---|---|---|---|---|---|---|---|---|---|
| 1989 | 3 | 7 | 5 | 2 | 0 | | | | 17 (first round) | 1 (first round in Group ) 1 (final round) | NH | |
| 1990 | 2 | 22 | 8 | 6 | 8 | 27 | 26 | +1 | 30+? | 10 | | |
| 1991 | 2 | 16 | 2 | 6 | 8 | 15 | 20 | −5 | 10+0 | 11 | | |
| 1992 | 2 | 10 | 2 | 6 | 2 | 13 | 14 | −1 | 10 | 3 (first round in Group 2) | | |
| 1993 | 1 | 6; 6 | 2; 3 | 1/0; 0/1 | 3; 2 | 9; 12 | 13; 6 | −2 +6 | 6 (first round); 6 (second round) | 6 | NH | New Plaza Stadium |
| 1994 | 2 | 20 | 7 | 11 | 2 | 31 | 23 | +8 | 25 | 4 | NH | New Plaza Stadium |
| 1995 | 2 | 22 | 9 | 6 | 7 | 32 | 31 | +1 | 33 | 5 | First round | New Plaza Stadium |
| 1996 | 2 | 22 | 12 | 6 | 4 | 34 | 15 | +19 | 42 | 3 | First round | New Plaza Stadium |
| 1997 | 2 | 22 | 9 | 2 | 11 | 29 | 34 | −5 | 29 | 8 | First round | New Plaza Stadium |
