= Yutong International Sports Center =

Sports venue in Shijiazhuang, China

Coordinates: 38°02′29″N 114°31′45″E

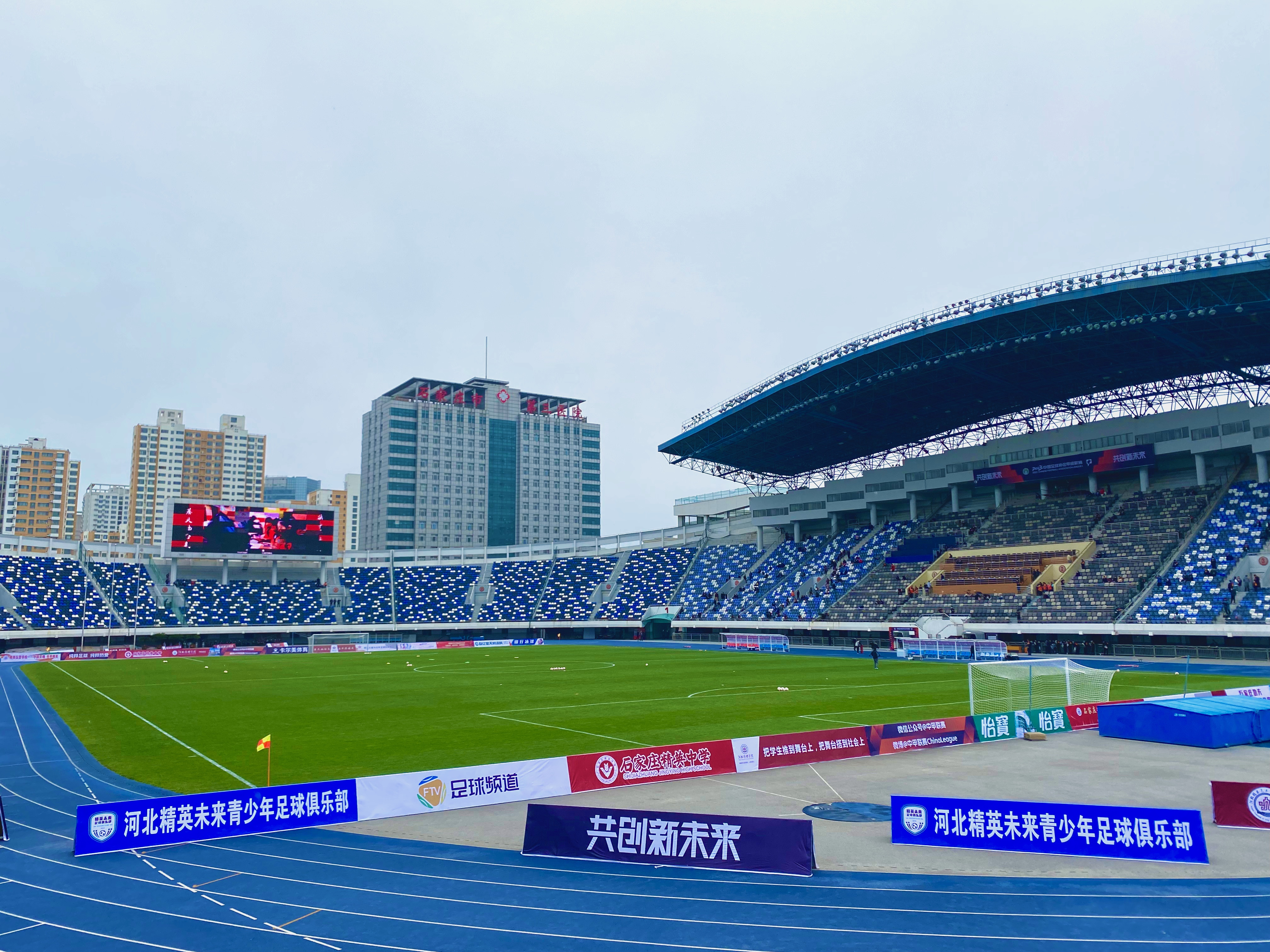
- Interactive map of Yutong International Sports Center
- Full name: Yutong International Sports Centre Stadium
- Location: No.1 Tiyu Southern Street, Shijiazhuang, Hebei, China
- Owner: Shijiazhuang Sports Bureau
- Operator: Shijiazhuang Sports Bureau
- Capacity: 29,000
- Surface: Grass
- Scoreboard: Yes
- Field size: 120 yd × 74 yd (110 m × 68 m)
- Public transit: 1 at Tiyuchang

Construction
- Built: 1950s
- Opened: 1950s
- Renovated: 1972, 1992, 2013

Tenants
- PLA Bayi (1997–1998); Hebei Zhongji (2010–2012); Shijiazhuang Yongchang (2013–2020); Shijiazhuang Gongfu (2023–）

The Yutong International Sports Centre Stadium (Simplified Chinese: 裕彤国际体育中心) is a multi-use stadium in Shijiazhuang, Hebei, China. It is currently used mostly for football matches. The capacity of this stadium is 29,000.

== See also ==
- List of football stadiums in China
- List of stadiums in China
- Lists of stadiums
