= Shaoguan City Xihe Sports Centre =

Sports venue in Shaoguan, China

Coordinates: 24°48′07″N 113°34′44″E

Shaoguan City Xihe Sports Centre (Chinese: 韶关市西河体育中心) is a multi-use stadium in Shaoguan, Guangdong, China. It is currently used mostly for football matches and athletics events. This stadium's capacity is 21,570 people.
