= Guangzhou Matsunichi F.C. =

Chinese football club

Guangzhou Matsunichi Guǎngzhōu Sōngrì 广州松日
- Full name: Matsunichi Electric Group FC Co, Ltd. 松日电器集团足球俱乐部有限公司
- Founded: 28 February 1995; 30 years ago
- Dissolved: 26 November 2000; 25 years ago
- Ground: Xihe Sports Centre
- Capacity: 21,570
Home colours	Away colours

Guangzhou Matsunichi Football Club (simplified Chinese: 广州松日; traditional Chinese: 廣州松日; pinyin: Guǎngzhōu Sōngrì) was a professional football club based in Guangzhou, Guangdong, PR China who last played in the 21,570 capacity Xihe Sports Centre in Shaoguan. The club was established when the youth team for Guangzhou F.C. whom were allowed to participate within the Chinese football league pyramid and have promoted to the second tier was sold-off to Pan Sutong and his company Matsunichi Digital Holdings Limited to form a separate club on 28 February 1995. The club would soon gain promotion to the top tier of Chinese football where in total they spent three seasons before suffering relegation at the 1999 league season. When the club experienced another relegation campaign in 2000, Pan Sutong decided to pull his funding for the club, which officially became defunct on 26 November 2000.

== History ==
The club was founded on the basis of the youth team for Guangzhou F.C. who were established in 1990 and allowed to participate within the Chinese football league pyramid. They were often referred to as Guangzhou B and in their first appearance within the Chinese leagues they entered the third tier in the 1992 season where they came third, which was enough to gain promotion for the 1993 campaign. After the 1993 league season was restructured the club were allowed to make their second appearance in the 1994 campaign, this time within the second tier where they went on to come third. With these impressive positions and with the dawn of professionalism, which allowed private investors to own football clubs the club decided to take advantage of this and separate from their parent club and sell the team to Pan Sutong and his company Matsunichi Digital Holdings Limited to form Guangzhou Matsunichi F.C. on 28 February 1995.

In the club's debut season under new ownership the team continued their upswing in results and came runners-up within the division at the end of the 1995 campaign and gained promotion to the top tier for the first time. A reunion with Guangzhou Apollo would also occur on 25 June and 1 July 1995 within the Chinese FA Cup that saw Guangzhou Matsunichi win 4–3 on aggregate. The team's constantly rising trajectory, however would come to an end in the 1996 league season after the club were unable to handle the top tier and experienced relegation at the end of the campaign. After that disappointment the club hired former Chinese national team coach Xu Genbao in the hopes that his experience could revive the club's fortunes and one of his first acts was to persuade the then current Chinese international footballer Gao Hongbo to take a step down in leagues and join the club. This move would be a huge success and the club gained promotion back into the top tier in their first attempt.

In the 1998 league season Xu Genbao left the club to manage the reigning league champions Dalian Wanda, which saw the club bring in Brazilian coach Edson Tavares. The new coach would make sure that the club would remain within the league and actually guided the team to fourth, however after only one season with the club Tavares left the team. Gao Hongbo was promoted to coach, but his inexperience saw him leave during the season, which saw the club bring Liu Kang into the team but he was unable to stop the team slide down the table and experience relegation at the end of the 1999 campaign. On 22 December 2011 it would be discovered that the club's General manager knew that the referee for the club's vital final game of the season was bribed to help keep fellow struggling team Shenyang Sealion in the division and he took a bribe to keep silent. After the disappointing season the team were unable to recover and faced relegation again in the 2000 campaign, which saw Pan Sutong decide to pull his funding for the club. This saw the club financially unsustainable and it became officially defunct on 26 November 2000.

== Former Players ==
(Brazil) Jacksen F. Tiago (1998)

== Managerial history ==
Managers who have coached the club and team since Guangzhou Matsunichi became a professional club back in 1995.

- (China) Xie Zhiguang (1995)
- (China) Liu Kang (1995)
- (Germany) Heinz Werner (1996)
- (China) Zhang Honggen (1996)
- (China) Xu Genbao (1997)
- (Germany) Heinz Werner (1998)
- (China) Chen Xirong (1998)
- (Brazil) Edson Tavares (1998)
- (China) Gao Hongbo (1999)
- (China) Gai Zengjun (1999)
- (China) Liu Kang (1999–00)
- (Argentina) Walter (2000)
- (China) Liu Kang (2000)
- (China) Liu Pingyu (2000)
- (China) Lu Jianren (2000)
- (China) Liu Pingyu (2000)
- (China) Li Yong (2000)
- (Brazil) Edson Tavares (2000)

== Results ==
All-time League Rankings

Year	Div	Pld	W	D	L	GF	GA	GD	Pts	Pos.	FA Cup	Super Cup	AFC	Att./G	Stadium
1995	2	22	10	8	4	31	27	+4	38	2	QF	DNQ	DNQ		Yuexiushan Stadium, Guangzhou
1996	1	22	2	9	11	10	26	−16	15	12	QF	DNQ	DNQ	11,727	Tianhe Stadium, Guangzhou
1997	2	22	9	7	6	33	22	+11	34	4	QF	DNQ	DNQ		Xihe Sports Centre, Shaoguan
1998	1	26	10	6	10	23	33	+10	36	4	R1	DNQ	DNQ	7,308	Guangdong Provincial People's Stadium, Guangzhou
1999	1	26	7	6	13	24	36	−12	27	13	R1	DNQ	DNQ	12,308	Guizhou Provincial Stadium, Guiyang
2000	2	22	2	10	10	15	35	−20	16	12	R1	DNQ	DNQ		Xihe Sports Centre, Shaoguan

- ^1 In final group stage. ^2 In second group stage. ^3 In group stage.

Key

	China top division
	China second division
	China third division
W	Winners
RU	Runners-up
3	Third place
	Relegated

- Pld = Played
- W = Games won
- D = Games drawn
- L = Games lost
- F = Goals for
- A = Goals against
- Pts = Points
- Pos = Final position
- DNQ = Did not qualify
- DNE = Did not enter
- NH = Not Held
- - = Does Not Exist
- R1 = Round 1
- R2 = Round 2
- R3 = Round 3
- R4 = Round 4
- F = Final
- SF = Semi-finals
- QF = Quarter-finals
- R16 = Round of 16
- Group = Group stage
- GS2 = Second Group stage
- QR1 = First Qualifying Round
- QR2 = Second Qualifying Round
- QR3 = Third Qualifying Round
