= 2015 Shanghai Greenland Shenhua F.C. season =

Shanghai Greenland
- Chairman: Zhu Jun
- Manager: Francis Gillot
- Super League: 6th
- FA Cup: Runners-up
- Top goalscorer: League: Tim Cahill (11 goals); All: Demba Ba; Tim Cahill (12 each)
Home colours	Away colours

The 2015 Shanghai Greenland Shenhua season was Shanghai Greenland Shenhua's 12th season in the Chinese Super League and 53rd overall in the Chinese top flight. They also competed in the Chinese FA Cup, reaching the final but ultimately losing to Jiangsu Sainty.

== Squad ==
Updated 5 March 2015 Note: Flags indicate national team as defined under FIFA eligibility rules; some limited exceptions apply. Players may hold more than one non-FIFA nationality.

No.	Pos.	Nation	Player
1	GK	CHN	Geng Xiaofeng
2	DF	CHN	Xiong Fei
3	DF	CHN	Li Jianbin
4	DF	GRE	Avraam Papadopoulos
5	MF	CHN	Wang Shouting
6	DF	CHN	Li Wenbo
8	MF	CHN	Zhang Lu
9	FW	SEN	Demba Ba
10	MF	COL	Giovanni Moreno (Captain)
11	FW	CHN	Lü Zheng
14	MF	MLI	Mohamed Sissoko
15	MF	CHN	Zhan Yilin
17	MF	AUS	Tim Cahill
18	FW	CHN	Gao Di

No.	Pos.	Nation	Player
19	DF	CHN	Zheng Kaimu
20	MF	CHN	Wang Yun
21	MF	CHN	Jiang Kun
22	GK	CHN	Qiu Shengjiong
23	DF	CHN	Bai Jiajun
24	MF	CHN	Deng Zhuoxiang
25	MF	CHN	Su Shun
27	MF	CHN	Liu Jiawei
28	MF	CHN	Cao Yunding
29	MF	CHN	Fan Lingjiang
30	DF	CHN	Tao Jin
32	FW	CHN	Wu Changqi
35	GK	CHN	Bai Shuo

=== Reserve squad ===
Note: Flags indicate national team as defined under FIFA eligibility rules; some limited exceptions apply. Players may hold more than one non-FIFA nationality.

No.	Pos.	Nation	Player
36	MF	CHN	Xiao Bang
37	MF	CHN	Han Yi
38	MF	CHN	Zhang Yuhao
39	DF	CHN	Zhang Zongzheng
40	FW	CHN	Xu Qi
41	DF	CHN	Liang Wei
42	MF	CHN	Zhang Jiawei
43	MF	CHN	Xie Fuquan
44	MF	CHN	Bo Xiaobo

No.	Pos.	Nation	Player
45	MF	CHN	Yan Ge
46	MF	CHN	Li Lianxiang
47	MF	CHN	Liao Zhilüe
48	MF	CHN	Xiong Zhenfeng
49	MF	CHN	Zhang Zhongyuan
50	GK	CHN	Dong Guangxiang
52	DF	CHN	Luo Xi
53	MF	CHN	Yang Chen

=== On loan ===
Note: Flags indicate national team as defined under FIFA eligibility rules; some limited exceptions apply. Players may hold more than one non-FIFA nationality.

No.	Pos.	Nation	Player
16	MF	CHN	Wang Fei (at Nei Mongol Zhongyou)
—	GK	CHN	Shen Jun (at CF Cracks until 30 June 2015)
—	GK	CHN	Zhu Yueqi (at CF Cracks until 30 June 2015)
—	DF	HKG	Brian Fok (at CF Cracks until 30 June 2015)
—	DF	CHN	Huang Bowen (at CF Cracks until 30 June 2015)
—	DF	CHN	Li Xiaoming (at CF Cracks until 30 June 2015)
—	DF	CHN	Leng Shiao (at CF Cracks until 30 June 2015)
—	DF	CHN	Cao Chuanyu (at CF Cracks until 30 June 2015)
—	DF	CHN	Xu Yougang (at CF Cracks until 30 June 2015)
—	DF	CHN	Deng Biao (at CF Cracks until 30 June 2015)
—	DF	ZAM	Stoppila Sunzu (at Lille until 30 June 2016)

No.	Pos.	Nation	Player
—	MF	CHN	Chen Tao (at CF Cracks until 30 June 2015)
—	MF	CHN	Xu Jun (at CF Cracks until 30 June 2015)
—	MF	CHN	Yan Xinyu (at CF Cracks until 30 June 2015)
—	MF	CHN	Lü Pin (at CF Cracks until 30 June 2015)
—	MF	CHN	Chen Qiyuan (at CF Cracks until 30 June 2015)
—	FW	ARG	Lucas Viatri (at Banfield until 31 December 2015)
—	FW	CHN	Xu Junmin (at CF Cracks until 30 June 2015)
—	FW	CHN	Zhou Jiahao (at CF Cracks until 30 June 2015)
—	FW	CHN	Gao Shipeng (at CF Cracks until 30 June 2015)
—	FW	BRA	Paulo Henrique (at Liaoning Whowin until 30 December 2015)

== Transfers ==
=== Winter ===
In: Note: Flags indicate national team as defined under FIFA eligibility rules; some limited exceptions apply. Players may hold more than one non-FIFA nationality.

No.	Pos.	Nation	Player
2	DF	CHN	Xiong Fei (loan return from (China) Wuhan Zall)
3	DF	CHN	Li Jianbin (from (China) Guangzhou Evergrande)
4	DF	GRE	Avraam Papadopoulos (from (Turkey) Trabzonspor)
8	MF	CHN	Zhang Lu (from (China) Henan Jianye)
11	FW	CHN	Lü Zheng (from (China) Shandong Luneng)
13	DF	ZAM	Stoppila Sunzu (from (France) Sochaux)
17	MF	AUS	Tim Cahill (from (United States) New York Red Bulls)
20	MF	CHN	Wang Yun (from (China) Shanghai Shenxin)
24	MF	CHN	Deng Zhuoxiang (from (China) Jiangsu Guoxin-Sainty)

Out: Note: Flags indicate national team as defined under FIFA eligibility rules; some limited exceptions apply. Players may hold more than one non-FIFA nationality.

No.	Pos.	Nation	Player
2	DF	HKG	Brian Fok (loan to (China) CF Cracks)
5	DF	KOR	Cho Byung-kuk (to (Thailand) Chonburi)
13	DF	BRA	Paulo André (to (Brazil) Cruzeiro)
14	MF	CHN	Gu Bin
17	MF	TPE	Chen Po-liang (to (China) Hangzhou Greentown)
20	MF	CHN	Xu Liang
23	DF	CHN	Liu Jiashen (to (China) Qingdao Hainiu)
24	GK	CHN	Shen Jun (loan to (China) CF Cracks)
34	FW	ARG	Lucas Viatri (loan to (Argentina) Banfield)

=== Summer ===
In: Note: Flags indicate national team as defined under FIFA eligibility rules; some limited exceptions apply. Players may hold more than one non-FIFA nationality.

No.	Pos.	Nation	Player
9	FW	SEN	Demba Ba (from (Turkey) Beşiktaş)
14	MF	MLI	Mohamed Sissoko (from (Spain) Levante)

Out: Note: Flags indicate national team as defined under FIFA eligibility rules; some limited exceptions apply. Players may hold more than one non-FIFA nationality.

No.	Pos.	Nation	Player
7	MF	CHN	Wang Changqing (to (China) Beijing BG)
12	FW	BRA	Paulo Henrique (loan to (China) Liaoning Whowin)
13	DF	ZAM	Stoppila Sunzu (loan to (France) Lille)
16	MF	CHN	Wang Fei (loan to (China) Nei Mongol Zhongyou)
26	MF	CHN	Liang Yu (to (China) Henan Jianye)

== Competitions ==
=== Chinese Super League ===
==== Results summary ====
Overall								Home						Away					
Pld	W	D	L	GF	GA	GD	Pts	W	D	L	GF	GA	GD	W	D	L	GF	GA	GD
30	12	6	12	42	44	−2	42	9	3	3	28	15	+13	3	3	9	14	29	−15

Last updated: 2 November 2015.
Source: Soccerway

==== Results ====
8 March 2015 1	Shanghai Greenland Shenhua	6–2	Shanghai Shenxin	Shanghai
19:45 (UTC+08)	Yunding (yellow card) 26'; Henrique 29', 56', 85'; Lim 39' (o.g.); Moreno 45' (pen.); Sunzu 90+3'	Summary	Jiajun (yellow card) 19'; Chongqiu (yellow card) 27'; Chengjian (yellow card) 44'; Chima 45+1'; Zhongguo 58'; Tianzi (yellow card) 67'	Stadium: Hongkou Football Stadium; Attendance: 21,328; Referee: Jin Wang

13 March 2015 2	Guangzhou R&F	0–1	Shanghai Greenland Shenhua	Guangzhou
19:35 (UTC+08)	Samuel (yellow card) 30'; Hamdallah (yellow card) 57'	Summary	Henrique 31'; Yunding (yellow card) 45'; Yun (yellow card) 90+5'	Stadium: Yuexiushan Stadium; Attendance: 11,093; Referee: Yejun Huang

22 March 2015 3	Shanghai Greenland Shenhua	1–0	Tianjin Teda	Shanghai
19:35 (UTC+08)	Jiajun 65'; Moreno (yellow card) 75'	Summary	Weifeng (yellow card) 5'	Stadium: Hongkou Football Stadium; Attendance: 22,337; Referee: Jun Li

3 April 2015 4	Beijing Guoan	2–0	Shanghai Greenland Shenhua	Beijing
19:35 (UTC+08)	Ting (yellow card) 24'; Matić 75'; Fejzullahu 90' (yellow card) 90+1'	Summary	Jianbin (yellow card) 47'; Papadopoulos (yellow card) 57'	Stadium: Workers Stadium; Attendance: 47,052; Referee: Jin Wang

11 April 2015 5	Shanghai Greenland Shenhua	2–2	Chongqing Lifan	Shanghai
19:45 (UTC+08)	Moreno 44'; Jianbin (yellow card) 49'; Yunding 59'	Summary	Yongzhe (yellow card) 19'; Leijer (yellow card) 28'; Gigliotti 45+1', 84' (yellow card) 65'; Wangsong (yellow card) 51'	Stadium: Hongkou Football Stadium; Attendance: 21,557; Referee: Fuxin Xu

19 April 2015 6	Henan Jianye	2–1	Shanghai Greenland Shenhua	Zhengzhou
19:45 (UTC+08)	Patiño 3'; Zachara (yellow card) 13'; Hongbo 37'; Dechao (yellow card) 85'; Jianjun (yellow card) 90+1'	Summary	Papadopoulos (yellow card) 56'; Yun (yellow card) 64'; Lingjiang (yellow card) 70'; Di 82'; Shouting (yellow card) 90+5'	Stadium: Zhengzhou Hanghai Stadium; Attendance: 20,255; Referee: Ming Fu

25 April 2015 7	Shanghai Greenland Shenhua	2–0	Hangzhou Greentown	Shanghai
19:45 (UTC+08)	Moreno 44' (yellow card) 83'; Cahill 63' (pen.) (yellow card) 65'; Yun (yellow card) 81'	Summary	Zhongliu (yellow card) 44'; Lin (yellow card) 61'; Boulaâbi (yellow card) 61'; Xiyang (yellow card) 83'	Stadium: Hongkou Football Stadium; Attendance: 21,835; Referee: Yejun Huang

1 May 2015 8	Shanghai Greenland Shenhua	0–3	Guangzhou Evergrande Taobao	Shanghai
19:45 (UTC+08)	Jiajun (yellow card) 83'	Summary	Lin 4'; Goulart 10' (yellow card) 72'; Bowen (yellow card) 15'; Zhi 25' (yellow card) 72'; Xuepeng (yellow card) 41'	Stadium: Hongkou Football Stadium; Attendance: 25,751; Referee: Wang Jin

9 May 2015 9	Shanghai SIPG	5–0	Shanghai Greenland Shenhua	Shanghai
19:45 (UTC+08)	Wang Shenchao (yellow card) 9'; Wang Jiajie (yellow card) 11'; Conca (yellow card) 37' (goal) 45+7'; Papadopoulos 47' (o.g.); Wu Lei 53'; Hysén 64', 71'	Summary	Cahill (yellow card) 3'; Geng Xiaofeng (yellow card) 12'; Lü Zheng (red card) 17'; Li Jianbin (yellow card) 22' (yellow-red card) 66'; Bai Jiajun (yellow card) 26' (yellow-red card) 45+4'	Stadium: Shanghai Stadium

17 May 2015 10	Shanghai Greenland Shenhua	1–1	Guizhou Renhe	Shanghai
19:45 (UTC+08)	Kun (yellow card) 30'; Di (yellow card) 45+2'; Moreno 54'; Kaimu (yellow card) 81'; Fei (yellow card) 85' (yellow-red card) 90+9'	Summary	Chen (yellow card) 10'; Chenglin (yellow card) 25'; Jie (yellow card) 40'; Santos 46'	Stadium: Hongkou Football Stadium; Attendance: 15,167; Referee: Zhang Lei

23 May 2015 11	Shandong Luneng Taishan	2–0	Shanghai Greenland Shenhua	Jinan
19:45 (UTC+08)	Zheng (yellow card) 26'; Xu 68', 88'	Summary	Fei (yellow card) 28'; Jianbin (yellow card) 72'	Stadium: Jinan Olympic Sports Center Stadium

30 May 2015 12	Shanghai Greenland Shenhua	0–0	Shijiazhuang Ever Bright	Shanghai
19:45 (UTC+08)	Cahill (yellow card) 57'; Jianbin (yellow card) 87'	Summary	Wei (yellow card) 28'; Shibo (yellow card) 78'; Chao (yellow card) 87'; Zhen (yellow card) 90+3'	Stadium: Hongkou Football Stadium; Referee: Zhe Wang

3 June 2015 13	Changchun Yatai	3–1	Shanghai Greenland Shenhua	Changchun
19:00 (UTC+08)	Shuai 36'; Zhe 50'; Huszti 70'	Summary	Zheng 89'	Stadium: Development Area Stadium

20 June 2015 14	Shanghai Greenland Shenhua	3–1	Liaoning Whowin	Shanghai
19:40 (UTC+08)	Papadopoulos (yellow card) 50'; Jianbin (yellow card) 65'; Cahill 67'; Di 90' (yellow card) 90'; Henrique 90+3'	Summary	Jianbin 31' (o.g.); Lu (yellow card) 70'; Shilin (yellow card) 71'	Stadium: Hongkou Football Stadium

24 June 2015 15	Jiangsu Guoxin-Sainty	3–2	Shanghai Greenland Shenhua	Nanjing
19:45 (UTC+08)	Sammir 7'; Xi 11'; Escudero (yellow card) 52'; Kjartansson 73'	Summary	Papadopoulos (yellow card) 35'; Cahill 52'; Yun 56'	Stadium: Nanjing Olympic Sports Centre

28 June 2015 16	Shanghai Shenxin	1–1	Shanghai Greenland Shenhua	Shanghai
19:45 (UTC+08)	Everton 7'; Yizhen (yellow card) 25'; Tao (yellow card) 45'; Chima (yellow card) 63'; Lim (yellow card) 90+2'	Summary	Jiajun (yellow card) 28'; Henrique 31'	Stadium: Yuanshen Sports Centre Stadium

4 July 2015 17	Shanghai Greenland Shenhua	1–0	Guangzhou R&F	Shanghai
19:45 (UTC+08)	Sissoko (yellow card) 20'; Cahill 75'	Summary	Samuel (yellow card) 32'; Míchel (yellow card) 82'	Stadium: Hongkou Football Stadium

11 July 2015 18	Tianjin Teda	1–1	Shanghai Greenland Shenhua	Tianjin
19:45 (UTC+08)	Barcos 76' (yellow card) 90+1'	Summary	Cahill 61'	Stadium: Tianjin Olympic Center Stadium; Referee: Fan Qi

15 July 2015 19	Shanghai Greenland Shenhua	3–1	Beijing Guoan	Shanghai
19:45 (UTC+08)	Shouting (yellow card) 26'; Yun 40'; Cahill 58'; Ba 69'; Lu (yellow card) 90'	Summary	Ting (yellow card) 14' (red card) 90+5'; Matić (yellow card) 64'; Damjanović 72'; Hejing (yellow card) 73'; Cheng (yellow card) 79'; Batalla (yellow card) 90'	Stadium: Hongkou Football Stadium

19 July 2015 20	Chongqing Lifan	0–2	Shanghai Greenland Shenhua	Chongqing
19:35 (UTC+08)	Fernandinho (yellow card) 72'	Summary	Lu (yellow card) 58'; Yunding 84'; Ba 90+4'	Stadium: Chongqing Olympic Sports Center; Referee: Guo Baolong

27 July 2015 21	Shanghai Greenland Shenhua	1–0	Henan Jianye	Shanghai
19:45 (UTC+08)	Cahill 49'	Summary	Gu (yellow card) 29'; Gomes (yellow card) 33'	Stadium: Hongkou Football Stadium

11 August 2015 22	Hangzhou Greentown	4–1	Shanghai Greenland Shenhua	Hangzhou
19:45 (UTC+08)	Chen 8'; Ramon 26', 60'; Angan 38'; Ge (yellow card) 51'	Summary	Lü 13'; Papadopoulos (yellow card) 64'	Stadium: Yellow Dragon Sports Center

15 August 2015 23	Guangzhou Evergrande Taobao	2–2	Shanghai Greenland Shenhua	Guangzhou
20:00 (UTC+08)	Xiaoting (yellow card) 17'; Elkeson 57'; Goulart 77'; Zhi (yellow card) 87'	Summary	Ba (yellow card) 38'; Moreno 43'; Kaimu (yellow card) 45+2'; Shouting (yellow card) 52'; Papadopoulos 88'	Stadium: Tianhe Stadium; Referee: Jun Li

23 August 2015 24	Shanghai Greenland Shenhua	1–2	Shanghai SIPG	Shanghai
19:45 (UTC+08)	Cahill 19' (pen.); Shouting (yellow card) 31'; Papadopoulos (yellow card) 90+3'	Summary	Xiang (yellow card) 15'; Gyan 65'; Sissoko 72' (o.g.)	Stadium: Hongkou Football Stadium; Referee: Jin Wang

12 September 2015 25	Guizhou Renhe	1–2	Shanghai Greenland Shenhua	Guiyang
19:45 (UTC+08)	Santos 77' (red card) 78'	Summary	Moreno 31'; Yun (yellow card) 41'; Cahill 45'; Jiajun (yellow card) 46'; Xiaofeng (yellow card) 60'	Stadium: Guiyang Olympic Sports Center

20 September 2015 26	Shanghai Greenland Shenhua	1–2	Shandong Luneng Taishan	Shanghai
19:45 (UTC+08)	Ba 3' (pen.); Shouting (yellow card) 5'; Fei (yellow card) 10'; Cahill (yellow card) 26'; Jianbin (yellow card) 58'; Zheng (yellow card) 90'	Summary	Zheng (yellow card) 17'; Aloísio 27' (pen.); Lin (red card) 77'; Urso 90+6'	Stadium: Hongkou Football Stadium; Attendance: 17,865; Referee: Li Jun

26 September 2015 27	Shijiazhuang Ever Bright	2–0	Shanghai Greenland Shenhua	Shijiazhuang
19:45 (UTC+08)	Mulenga 29'; Guðjohnsen 54' (pen.)	Summary	Papadopoulos (yellow card) 31'; Moreno (yellow card) 45+2'; Fei (yellow card) 64'	Stadium: Yutong International Sports Center; Referee: Guo Baolong

17 October 2015 28	Shanghai Greenland Shenhua	3–0	Changchun Yatai	Shanghai
15:00 (UTC+08)	Sissoko 2'; Cahill 40', 86'	Summary	Ismailov (yellow card) 31'; Feng (yellow card) 56'; Jie (yellow card) 75'	Stadium: Hongkou Football Stadium; Referee: Ma Ning

25 October 2015 29	Liaoning Whowin	1–0	Shanghai Greenland Shenhua	Panjin
15:00 (UTC+08)	Chaosheng 47'; Sheng (yellow card) 57'; Yun (yellow card) 86'; Lu (yellow card) 88'	Summary	Zheng (yellow card) 78'	Stadium: Panjin Jinxiu Stadium; Attendance: 13,219; Referee: Gang Zhou

31 October 2015 30	Shanghai Greenland Shenhua	3–1	Jiangsu Guoxin-Sainty	Shanghai
15:00 (UTC+08)	Ba 25' (pen.), 37', 65' (yellow card) 64'; Lu (yellow card) 49'; Fei (yellow card) 51'	Summary	Jianye (yellow card) 31'; Yuan 55'	Stadium: Hongkou Football Stadium; Referee: Jin Wang

==== Table ====
Pos	Team	Pld	W	D	L	GF	GA	GD	Pts
4	Beijing Guoan	30	16	8	6	46	26	+20	56
5	Henan Jianye	30	12	10	8	35	30	+5	46
6	Shanghai Greenland Shenhua	30	12	6	12	42	44	−2	42
7	Shijiazhuang Ever Bright	30	8	15	7	34	31	+3	39
8	Chongqing Lifan	30	9	8	13	37	52	−15	35 (Note: Head-to-head points: Chongqing Lifan 6 pts, Jiangsu Guoxin-Sainty 5 pts, Changchun Yatai 5 pts; Head-to-head results between Jiangsu and Changchun — Jiangsu: 2 pts, 0 goal difference and 2 away goals, Changchun: 2 pts 0 goal difference and 1 away goal.)

Source: sports.sina.com (in Chinese)
Rules for classification: 1) points; 2) head-to-head points; 3) head-to-head goals scored; 4) head-to-head away goals scored; 5)goal difference; 6) number of goals scored; 7) disciplinary points (1 point for each yellow card, 3 points for each red card). Head-to-Head: Only used at the end of the season when two or more teams need the head-to-head rules to break a tie.

=== Chinese FA Cup ===
13 May 2015 Third Round	Meizhou Wuhua	0–2	Shanghai Greenland Shenhua	Guangzhou
16:00 (UTC+08)		Summary	Yun 13'; Yilin 65'	Stadium: Guangdong Provincial People's Stadium

8 July 2015 Fourth Round	Qingdao Jonoon	0–3	Shanghai Greenland Shenhua	Qingdao
15:30 (UTC+08)		Summary	Lü 23'; Wang 70'; Fan 88'	Stadium: Qingdao Tiantai Stadium; Referee: Zhang Lei

19 August 2015 Fifth Round	Shanghai Greenland Shenhua	3–3 (5–4 p)	Shanghai SIPG	Shanghai
(UTC+08)	Moreno 9'; Yun 26'; Ba 70'	Summary	Wu Lei 28'; Gyan 57'; Conca 87'	Stadium: Hongkou Football Stadium; Referee: Tan Hai
	Penalties
	Yun (penalty scored); Cahill (penalty scored); Demba Ba (penalty scored); Sissoko (penalty scored); Lü Zheng (penalty scored)		Conca (penalty scored); Davi (penalty scored); Gyan (penalty scored); Lü Wenjun (penalty missed); Wu Lei (penalty scored)

30 September 2015 Semifinal 1st leg	Shanghai Greenland Shenhua	3–2	Beijing BG Yanjing	Shanghai
(UTC+08)	Ba 4', 37' (pen.), 82' (pen.)	Summary	Cui Zhongkai 13'; Valencia 65'	Stadium: Hongkou Football Stadium; Attendance: 18,760; Referee: Lin Jun

21 October 2015 Semifinal 2nd leg	Beijing BG Yanjing	1–4 (3–7 agg.)	Shanghai Greenland Shenhua	Beijing
19:30 (UTC+08)	Lazović 90+1' (pen.)	Summary	Cahill 17'; Ba 28', 78'; Cao Yunding 90+3'	Stadium: Olympic Sports Centre; Attendance: 9,108; Referee: He Xiaohu

==== Final ====
22 November 2015 1st leg	Jiangsu Guoxin-Sainty	0–0	Shanghai Greenland Shenhua	Nanjing
19:45 (UTC+08)	Yang Xiaotian (yellow card) 90+2' (yellow-red card) 90+3'	Summary	Sissoko (yellow card) 41'	Stadium: Nanjing Olympic Sports Center; Attendance: 53,166; Referee: Fan Qi

29 November 2015 2nd leg	Shanghai Greenland Shenhua	0–0 (a.e.t.) (0–1 agg.)	Jiangsu Guoxin-Sainty	Shanghai
16:00 (UTC+08)	Li Jianbin (yellow card) 17'; Wang Yun (yellow card) 80'; Bai Jiajun (yellow card) 90+5'; Cahill (yellow card) 90+5'; Xiong Fei (yellow card) 102'	[ Summary]	Zhou Yun (yellow card) 53'; Zhang Sipeng (yellow card) 76'; Sammir 110'; Ren Hang (yellow card) 90+4'; Ottesen (yellow card) 90+5'; Ke (yellow card) 120'; Ang (yellow card) 120+2'	Stadium: Hongkou Football Stadium; Attendance: 25,332; Referee: Wang Zhe

== Squad statistics ==
As of match played 29 October 2015

=== Appearances and goals ===
No.	Pos	Nat	Player	Total		Super League		FA Cup	
No.	Pos	Nat	Player	Apps	Goals	Apps	Goals	Apps	Goals
1	GK	(China) CHN	Geng Xiaofeng	27	0	19+2	0	6	0
2	DF	(China) CHN	Xiong Fei	25	0	16+4	0	4+1	0
3	DF	(China) CHN	Li Jianbin	33	0	26	0	7	0
4	DF	(Greece) GRE	Avraam Papadopoulos	24	1	18+5	1	1	0
5	MF	(China) CHN	Wang Shouting	26	0	13+9	0	3+1	0
6	DF	(China) CHN	Li Wenbo	2	0	2	0	0	0
8	MF	(China) CHN	Zhang Lu	25	0	17+2	0	5+1	0
9	FW	(Senegal) SEN	Demba Ba	16	12	11	6	5	6
10	MF	(Colombia) COL	Giovanni Moreno	30	7	26	6	4	1
11	FW	(China) CHN	Lü Zheng	31	3	18+7	2	4+2	1
14	MF	(Mali) MLI	Mohamed Sissoko	15	1	10	1	4+1	0
15	MF	(China) CHN	Zhan Yilin	5	1	1+2	0	0+2	1
17	MF	(Australia) AUS	Tim Cahill	34	12	28	11	6	1
18	FW	(China) CHN	Gao Di	24	2	9+14	2	1	0
19	DF	(China) CHN	Zheng Kaimu	11	0	3+4	0	0+4	0
20	MF	(China) CHN	Wang Yun	34	5	26+1	2	7	3
21	MF	(China) CHN	Jiang Kun	11	0	1+7	0	0+3	0
22	GK	(China) CHN	Qiu Shengjiong	11	0	10	0	1	0
23	DF	(China) CHN	Bai Jiajun	33	1	26	1	6+1	0
24	MF	(China) CHN	Deng Zhuoxiang	3	0	1+2	0	0	0
28	MF	(China) CHN	Cao Yunding	25	3	17+3	2	5	1
29	MF	(China) CHN	Fan Lingjiang	9	1	4+2	0	1+2	1
30	DF	(China) CHN	Tao Jin	9	0	4+1	0	4	0
33	MF	(China) CHN	Xu Jun	1	0	0+1	0	0	0
56	DF	(China) CHN	Xu Yougang	1	0	0+1	0	0	0
Players who away from the club on loan:
12	FW	(Brazil) BRA	Paulo Henrique	12	6	10+1	6	1	0
13	DF	(Zambia) ZAM	Stoppila Sunzu	13	1	13	1	0	0
16	MF	(China) CHN	Wang Fei	4	0	1+2	0	1	0
Players who appeared for Shanghai Greenland Shenhua who left during the season:
7	MF	(China) CHN	Wang Changqing	3	0	0+2	0	1	0

=== Goal scorers ===
Place	Position	Nation	Number	Name	Super League	FA Cup	Total
1	MF	(Australia)	17	Tim Cahill	11	1	12
1	FW	(Senegal)	9	Demba Ba	6	6	12
3	MF	(Colombia)	10	Giovanni Moreno	6	1	7
4	MF	(Brazil)	31	Paulo Henrique	6	0	6
5	MF	(China)	20	Wang Yun	2	3	5
6	FW	(China)	11	Lü Zheng	2	1	3
6	MF	(China)	28	Cao Yunding	2	1	3
8	FW	(China)	18	Gao Di	2	0	2
9	DF	(Zambia)	13	Stoppila Sunzu	1	0	1
9	DF	(China)	23	Bai Jiajun	1	0	1
9	DF	(Greece)	4	Avraam Papadopoulos	1	0	1
9	MF	(Mali)	14	Mohamed Sissoko	1	0	1
9	MF	(China)	15	Zhan Yilin	0	1	1
9	MF	(China)	29	Fan Lingjiang	0	1	1
9				Own goal	1	0	1
				TOTALS	42	15	57

=== Disciplinary record ===
Number	Nation	Position	Name	Super League		FA Cup		Total	
Number	Nation	Position	Name	Yellow card	Red card	Yellow card	Red card	Yellow card	Red card
1	(China)	GK	Geng Xiaofeng	2	0	0	0	2	0
2	(China)	DF	Xiong Fei	4	0	0	0	4	0
3	(China)	DF	Li Jianbin	8	1	0	0	8	1
4	(Greece)	DF	Avraam Papadopoulos	7	0	0	0	7	0
5	(China)	MF	Wang Shouting	5	0	0	0	5	0
8	(China)	MF	Zhang Lu	3	0	0	0	3	0
9	(Senegal)	FW	Demba Ba	2	0	0	0	2	0
10	(Colombia)	MF	Giovanni Moreno	3	0	0	0	3	0
11	(China)	FW	Lü Zheng	2	1	0	0	2	1
14	(Mali)	MF	Mohamed Sissoko	1	0	0	0	1	0
16	(China)	MF	Wang Fei	2	1	0	0	2	1
17	(Australia)	MF	Tim Cahill	4	0	0	0	4	0
18	(China)	FW	Gao Di	2	0	0	0	2	0
19	(China)	DF	Zheng Kaimu	2	0	0	0	2	0
20	(China)	MF	Wang Yun	4	0	0	0	4	0
21	(China)	MF	Jiang Kun	1	0	0	0	1	0
23	(China)	DF	Bai Jiajun	5	1	0	0	5	1
28	(China)	MF	Cao Yunding	2	0	0	0	2	0
29	(China)	MF	Fan Lingjiang	1	0	0	0	1	0
			TOTALS	60	4	0	0	60	4
