= Xiong Fei =

Chinese footballer

Xiong Fei 熊飞
Personal information
- Date of birth: October 21, 1987 (age 39)
- Place of birth: Wuhan, Hubei, China
- Height: 1.81 m (5 ft 11 1/2 in)
- Positions: Right-back; defensive midfielder

Youth career
- 2007: Wuhan Optics Valley

Senior career*
Years	Team	Apps	(Gls)
2008	Wuhan Optics Valley	0	(0)
2009	Nanjing Yoyo	21	(3)
2010–2017	Shanghai Shenhua	63	(1)
2014	→ Wuhan Zall (loan)	9	(0)
2018–2019	Liaoning FC	55	(0)
2020–2022	Wuhan Three Towns	34	(1)
- * Club domestic league appearances and goals as of 11 January 2023

Xiong Fei (simplified Chinese: 熊飞; traditional Chinese: 熊飛; pinyin: Xióng Fēi) (born October 21, 1987) is a Chinese former football player who played as right-back or defensive midfielder.

== Club career ==
Xiong Fei originally played for the youth team of Wuhan Optics Valley and even graduated to their senior team at the beginning of the 2008 league season. When the senior team was disbanded during 2008 he was taken on by second tier club Nanjing Yoyo and would make his debut on April 19, 2009 in a league game against Guangdong Sunray Cave F.C. that ended in 1–0 defeat. His performance was good enough for him to gain a regular place within the team and he quickly showed his attacking potential despite being a defender when he scored his first goal against Nanchang Bayi on July 11, 2009 in a 1–1 draw. After having a personally impressive season for Nanjing he would transfer to top tier side Shanghai Shenhua where he would eventually make his debut coming on as a late substitute for Jiang Kun in a league game on August 22, 2010 in a 1–0 victory against Chongqing Lifan. He would however struggle to get much playing time until the 2011 league season when the club's first choice right back Wu Xi would be pushed more into midfield and Xiong saw significantly more playing time where he eventually played in twelve league games by the end of the season.

On 19 July 2014, Xiong was loaned to China League One side Wuhan Zall until 31 December 2014. On his return he would start to establish himself as a regular until the introduction of Zhang Lu, who replaced him as the clubs first choice right-back. On 17 January 2018, Xiong transferred to Liaoning F.C. After twos seasons with the club he left on a free transfer on 23 May 2020 after Liaoning Football Club was disqualified by Chinese Football Association (CFA) due to wage arrears. On 5 August 2020, Xiong moved to Wuhan Three Towns. In his first season with the club he would go on to aid them in winning the division title and promotion into the second tier. This would be followed by another division title win and promotion as the club entered the top tier for the first tine in their history. The following campaign he would be part of the squad that won the 2022 Chinese Super League title.

On 21 May 2026, Xiong was given a 5-year ban for match-fixing by the Chinese Football Association.

== Career statistics ==
Statistics accurate as of match played 11 January 2023.

Appearances and goals by club, season and competition
Club	Season	League			National Cup		Continental		Other		Total	
Club	Season	Division	Apps	Goals	Apps	Goals	Apps	Goals	Apps	Goals	Apps	Goals
Wuhan Optics Valley	2008	Chinese Super League	0	0	-		-		-		0	0
Nanjing Yoyo	2009	China League One	21	3	-		-		-		21	3
Shanghai Shenhua	2010	Chinese Super League	2	0	-		-		-		2	0
Shanghai Shenhua	2011	Chinese Super League	12	0	0	0	2	0	-		14	0
Shanghai Shenhua	2012	Chinese Super League	1	0	0	0	-		-		1	0
Shanghai Shenhua	2013	Chinese Super League	6	1	1	0	-		-		7	1
Shanghai Shenhua	2014	Chinese Super League	1	0	0	0	-		-		1	0
Shanghai Shenhua	2015	Chinese Super League	21	0	5	0	-		-		26	0
Shanghai Shenhua	2016	Chinese Super League	16	0	4	0	-		-		20	0
Shanghai Shenhua	2017	Chinese Super League	4	0	1	0	-		-		5	0
Shanghai Shenhua	Total		63	1	11	0	2	0	0	0	76	1
Wuhan Zall (loan)	2014	China League One	9	0	0	0	-		-		9	0
Liaoning FC	2018	China League One	29	0	0	0	-		-		29	0
Liaoning FC	2019	China League One	26	0	0	0	-		2 (Note: Appearance(s) in CL1 Relegation play-offs)	0	28	0
Liaoning FC	Total		55	0	0	0	0	0	2	0	57	0
Wuhan Three Towns	2020	China League Two	11	0	-		-		-		11	0
Wuhan Three Towns	2021	China League One	18	1	1	0	-		-		19	1
Wuhan Three Towns	2022	Chinese Super League	5	0	3	0	-		-		8	0
Wuhan Three Towns	Total		34	1	4	0	0	0	0	0	38	1
Career total			182	5	15	0	2	0	2	0	201	5

== Honours ==
=== Club ===
Wuhan Three Towns

- Chinese Super League: 2022.
- China League One: 2021
- China League Two: 2020
