= Tim Cahill =

Australian soccer player (born 1979)

Tim Cahill AO
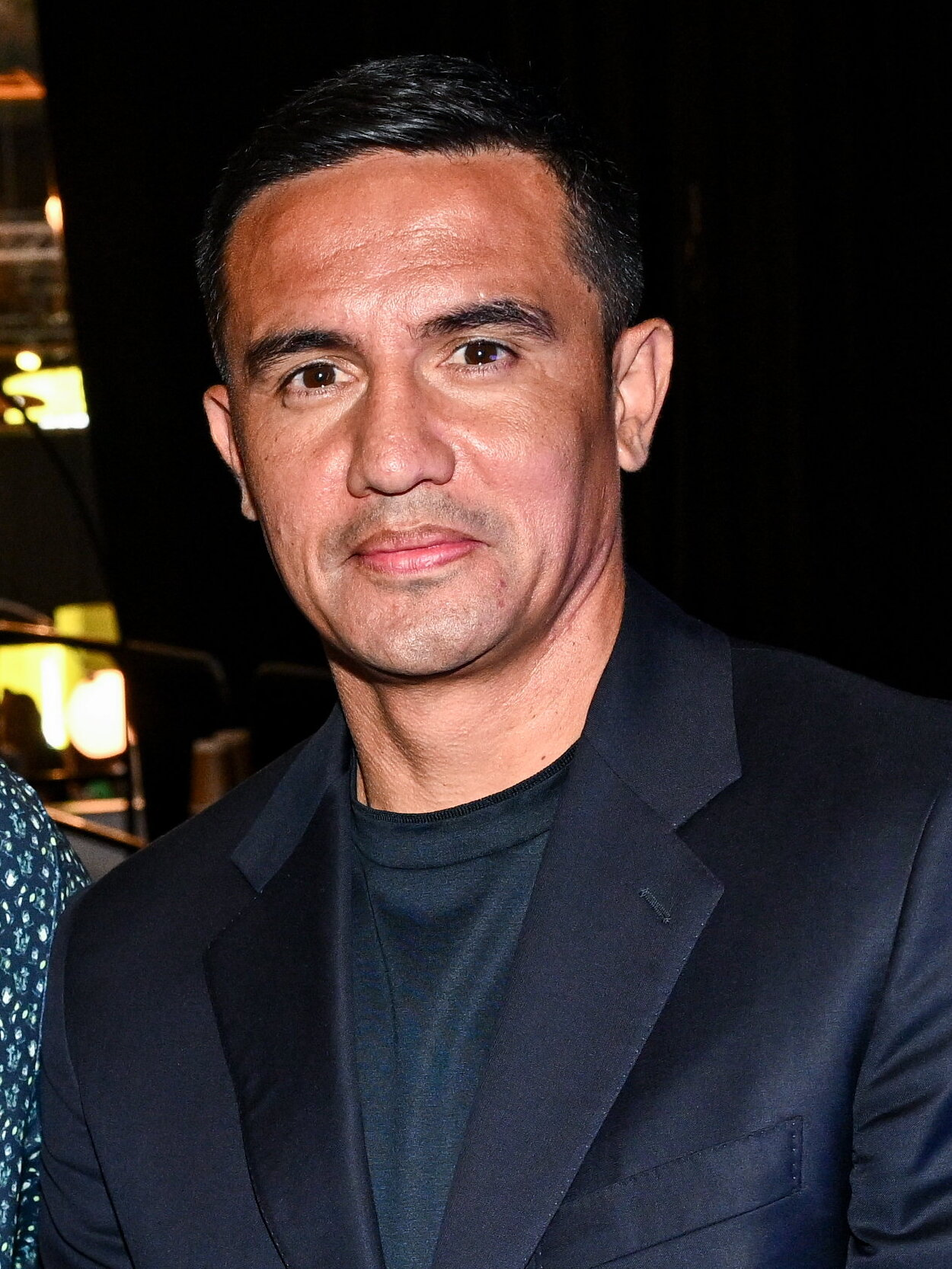
- Cahill in 2024

Personal information
- Full name: Timothy Filiga Cahill
- Date of birth: 6 December 1979 (age 46)
- Place of birth: Sydney, New South Wales, Australia
- Height: 1.78 m (5 ft 10 in)
- Positions: Midfielder; forward

Youth career
- 1995–1997: Sydney Olympic
- 1997: Sydney United

Senior career*
Years	Team	Apps	(Gls)
1997	Sydney United	2	(0)
1997–2004	Millwall	217	(52)
2004–2012	Everton	226	(56)
2012–2015	New York Red Bulls	62	(14)
2015–2016	Shanghai Shenhua	28	(11)
2016	Hangzhou Greentown	17	(4)
2016–2017	Melbourne City	27	(11)
2018	Millwall	10	(0)
2018–2019	Jamshedpur	12	(2)
Total		601	(150)

International career
1994	Western Samoa U20	2	(0)
2004	Australia Olympic (O.P.)	4	(3)
2004–2018	Australia	108	(50)
Medal record
Men's football
Representing Australia
AFC Asian Cup
Winner	2015 Australia
Runner-up	2011 Qatar
OFC Nations Cup
Winner	2004 Australia
- * Club domestic league appearances and goals

Timothy Filiga Cahill AO (Samoan: [fiˈli.ŋa]; /ˈkeɪhɪl/; born 6 December 1979) is an Australian former professional football player who played as an attacking midfielder but also played as a striker on many occasions. A box-to-box midfielder, Cahill became recognised for "his aggressive and powerful approach and his ability to head the ball in the penalty area". Cahill has scored 50 goals in 108 caps between 2004 and 2018 and is the all time top goalscorer for the Australian men's national team. He is regarded as one of the greatest Australian soccer players of all time. He currently works as a pundit for BBC Sport and Sky Sports.

In 1997, Cahill left Sydney for England to play professionally; there he was signed by Millwall on a free transfer from Sydney United. He was part of the Millwall side that won the Football League Second Division title in the 2000–01 season, and was also a central part of Millwall's run to the 2004 FA Cup final. Before the start of the 2004–05 season, Cahill was transferred to Premier League club Everton. He was named both Everton Player of the Season and Everton Players' Player of the Season in his debut season, and in the following year he was named as one of 50 nominees for the Ballon d'Or, becoming the first Everton player in 11 years to be nominated. He was also part of the Everton side that reached the 2009 FA Cup final. After leaving Everton in 2012, Cahill played for the New York Red Bulls in Major League Soccer and Chinese Super League sides Shanghai Shenhua and Hangzhou Greentown, before returning to Australia to play for Melbourne City in the A-League. After a brief spell at former club Millwall, he ended his career in the Indian Super League with Jamshedpur.

Cahill was the first Australian to score at a FIFA World Cup, scored in three World Cups (2006, 2010, and 2014) and has scored the most goals by any Australian in the men's World Cup with five goals. In 2007, he became the first Australian player to score at an AFC Asian Cup. Cahill is known for his adept heading ability and high vertical leap, having scored many of his goals with his head. He is famous for his regular goal celebration of shadow boxing around the corner flag.

== Early life ==
Timothy Filiga Cahill was born on 6 December 1979 in Sydney, Australia to Tim Cahill Sr. and Sisifo Cahill (née Belford). His father is of English and Irish descent, raised in London, England, and was a merchant seaman before he settled in Australia where he worked as a rigger and trawler. His mother is of Samoan descent and was born in a small village in Apia, Samoa. His maternal grandfather and great-grandfather held chief positions. His mother worked two jobs to support the family after his father was unable to work due to a hip injury. Cahill has an older brother, Sean, an older sister, Dorothy, and a younger brother, Chris. He has two cousins who are professional rugby players, Frank Winterstein and Ben Roberts. (Note: Cahill's aunty and mother of Ben Roberts, Ruby Roberts, is married to Frank Winterstein's uncle, Toa Winterstein.)

As a child, Cahill grew up playing soccer with his brothers and father. He also played rugby. At the age of seven, Cahill took private coaching under John Doyle who was a soccer player in the National Soccer League. Since he was four, Cahill played for Balmain Police Tigers, Marrickville Red Devil, and Lakemba SC. He played in the same team with his older brother, despite being a year younger, so his parents spent less on fuel. He also played futsal with Banshee Knights, created and named by his father after the banshee screams. Cahill attended Bexley North Public School, Annandale North Public School, Tempe High School, and Kingsgrove North High School. (Note: Cahill attended Bexley North Public School until 1991 before moving to Annandale Public School. He returned to the St George region when he was a teenager, attending Kingsgrove North High School.) He represented the public school select squads, Metropolitan East and the NSW PSSA teams. In high school, Cahill measured up to 1.65 m.

Cahill signed for Sydney Olympic in the club's youth teams and was a ball boy for the first-team in the NSL. After five years at the club, he was released. Cahill later played for both the NSW Institute of Sport and Belmore Hercules, a club that played in the fourth tier of Australia soccer. Cahill first played in the under-18 team, and later the first team for Belmore Hercules. At the age of 15 at the time, he became the youngest player at the club to make his first-team debut. By the end of the season, he was the top goalscorer across the under-18, under-21, and senior squads with a total of 30 goals. He then signed for Sydney United in their under-21 team. He eventually made his first-team debut on 22 March 1997 in a 0–0 draw against St George in the NSL. Cahill moved to England in 1997 after his stint with Sydney United. His parents took out a $10,000 loan, which nearly bankrupted them, for him to stay with his English relatives. His older brother began working full-time as a mechanic to help repay the debt.

== Club career ==
=== Millwall ===
He lived in Grays, Essex with family until he was signed by Millwall on a free transfer from Sydney United. He made his Millwall debut on 2 May 1998 against AFC Bournemouth at The Den, which Millwall lost 2–1. Cahill helped Millwall reach the 1999 Football League Trophy Final where they lost to Wigan Athletic.

He was part of the Millwall side that won the Football League Second Division championship with a club record 93 points in the 2000–01 season. He also reached two play-off semi-finals with Millwall in 2000 and 2002. Cahill was a central part of Millwall's run to the 2004 FA Cup Final, their first appearance in the showpiece in club history, scoring the winning goal in the semi-final against Sunderland, and securing a UEFA Cup place in the process. Cahill polled over 100,000 votes to win the FA Cup "Player of the Round" award for his performance during the semi-final victory. His last game for the club was against Manchester United in the final, which Millwall lost 3–0. Cahill made 249 overall appearances for The Lions, scoring 56 goals in the process.

=== Everton ===
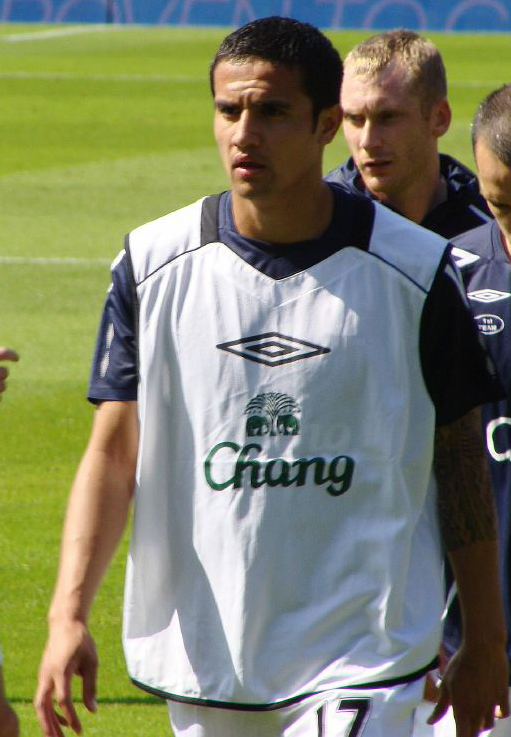
Tim Cahill training with Everton in April 2009

Before the start of the 2004–05 season, Cahill was transferred to Everton for a fee of £1.5 million, after Millwall's South East London rivals Crystal Palace ended their transfer bid over a payment to Cahill's agents. In his first season, he was Everton's top goalscorer and was the fans' Player of the Season. Before the 2005–06 season Cahill's contract at Everton was extended with a salary increase reflecting the impact he had made at the club. The third round of that season's FA Cup drew Cahill's former club, Millwall against Everton at The Den. He scored the winner in the replay at Goodison Park, but chose not to celebrate his winning goal, stating, "I decided not to go mad and just pay my respects to the club that gave me my start in the game. To celebrate would have been a kick in the teeth, it is all about respect."

In October 2006, Cahill was named as one of 50 nominees for the Ballon d'Or, becoming the first Everton player in 18 years to be nominated, and the only player on the list from an AFC nation. He missed much of the 2006–07 season with injuries to his knee and foot, but signed a five-year contract extension at the season's end.

Cahill returned from injury partway through the 2007–08 season in the club's first UEFA Cup Group match, a home match against Greek side AEL on 25 October 2007, scoring from a diving header after 14 minutes in a 3–1 win. His extra time winner against Luton Town on 31 October in the League Cup, sent Everton into their first cup quarter-final in more than 5 years. His 100th league appearance for Everton came in a 1–1 draw against Sunderland. Due to injuries to all four of Everton's senior strikers Cahill was employed as a makeshift forward during December 2008. In this role he scored a late equaliser in the Merseyside Derby, becoming the first player since Dixie Dean to score for Everton in three Anfield derbies. His 100th career goal was scored against Arsenal at Goodison on 28 January 2009.

On 15 February, Cahill scored the third goal in a 3–1 win over Aston Villa and dedicated the goal to the victims of the 2009 Victorian bushfires. During the second half of the 2008–09 season, Cahill was used more as the "utility man" due to his versatility as Everton was plagued by injuries to playmaker Mikel Arteta as well as strikers Victor Anichebe and Yakubu and some other key players.

Owing to Phil Neville sustaining a knee ligament injury early in the 2009–10 season, Cahill was named as the replacement captain of Everton. Later in the season he scored his 50th goal for Everton, in a 3–1 victory over Carlisle United in the Third Round of the FA Cup.

Everton fans gave him the nickname "Tiny Tim" after the Charles Dickens character because he is slightly short and slim. He has made a corner flag goal celebration his "trademark". The celebration, where Cahill pretends to trade punches with the corner flag while putting the Everton badge between his teeth, was first seen in the 2005–06 season. On 2 March 2008, Cahill controversially celebrated his goal in the 3–1 home victory of Portsmouth by crossing his wrists as if he had been handcuffed. This was in reference to the recent jailing of his brother, Sean; Cahill later apologised for the gesture. Cahill dedicated his winning goal in a Europa League game against BATE Borisov to the victims of the earthquake and tsunami in Samoa, miming rowing a canoe after scoring in the second half of the match in Belarus.

Cahill scored two goals against Aston Villa on 14 April 2010, both coming from headers to move his goal tally for the season to nine goals, all coming from his head. Three days later against Blackburn Rovers, Cahill scored a 90th-minute winner, to give Everton a 3–2 victory.

Cahill made his 200th appearance for Everton on 25 April 2010 in a 2–1 against Fulham, and signed a new four-year contract the following month. He scored his fifth goal in a Merseyside derby, in a 2–0 win over Liverpool in October 2010, and his 50th Premier League goal a month later, in a game against Blackpool. The Aussie received a foot injury during the 2011 Asia Cup finals which limited his appearances until the end of the season to only nine – eight league games and one in the FA Cup.

Following his participation in the 2011 Asian Cup, Cahill had the longest goal drought in his career. He scored his last league goal in December 2010 away to Manchester City and went the whole of 2011 without finding the net. The run stretched to 34 games, but was finally ended when he scored the opening goal, a tap in from close range, in a 1–1 draw with Blackburn in January 2012.

On 13 May 2012, during Everton's last match against Newcastle United at Goodison Park, Cahill was sent off for violent conduct after the full-time whistle for an altercation with Yohan Cabaye. After eight years with Everton, Cahill thanked the club and fans saying, "I want to thank everyone at Everton, from the club to tremendous supporters. It has been a privilege to be an Everton player for the past eight years and it was a very difficult decision to leave. I will always support Everton and I wish the club the best of luck in the future."

=== New York Red Bulls ===
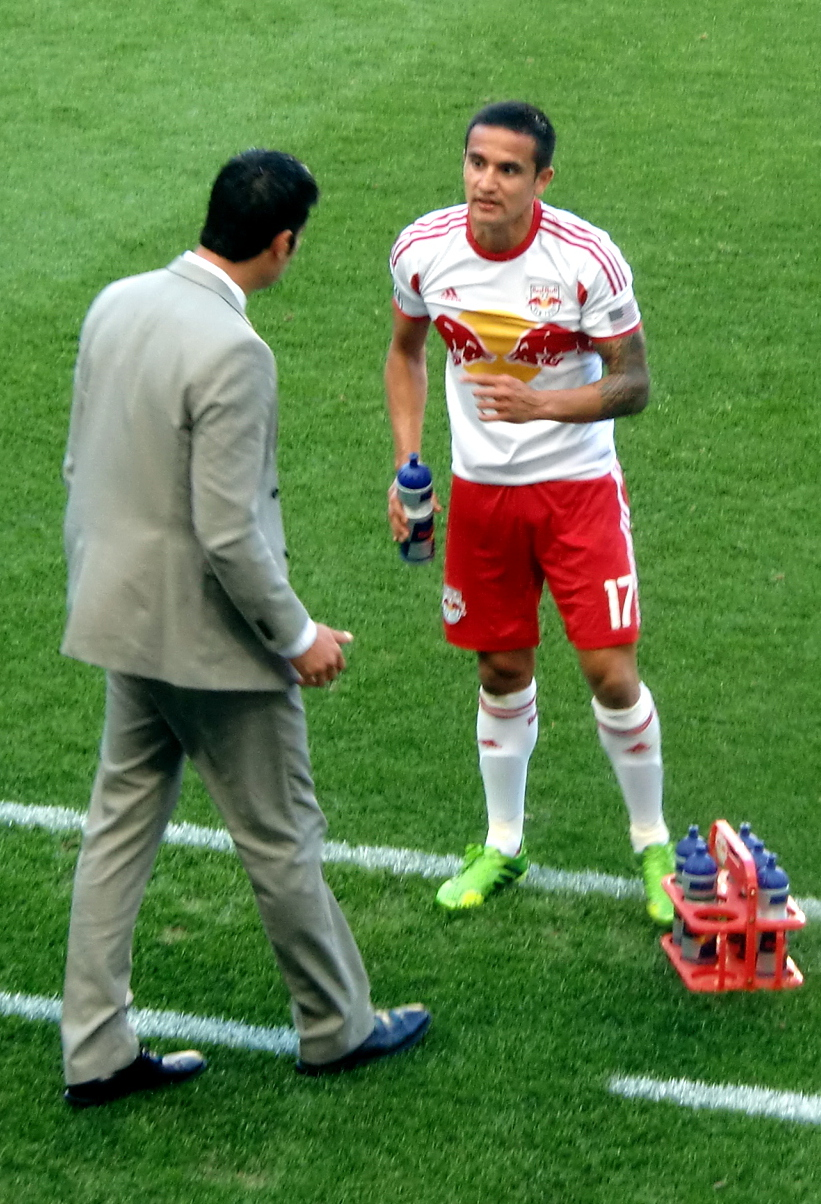
Cahill with the New York Red Bulls in May 2013

On 26 July 2012, Cahill signed for the New York Red Bulls of Major League Soccer as a Designated Player, for a fee reported to be approximately £1 million. He made his MLS debut in a game against the Houston Dynamo the following month. On 19 May 2013 Cahill scored a goal which turned out to be the winner in the 91st minute against the Los Angeles Galaxy in a 1–0 win. On 20 October 2013, Cahill set a new record (broken in 2015 by Mike Grella) for the fastest goal in MLS history when he scored eight seconds into a 3–0 win against the Houston Dynamo. Cahill replaced suspended forward Bradley Wright-Phillips in the second leg of the Red Bulls' MLS Cup semi-final against the New England Revolution on 29 November 2014. Despite Cahill opening the scoring in the 26th minute to level the tie, the Red Bulls bowed out with a 2–2 draw in Massachusetts, losing 4–3 on aggregate. On 2 February 2015, Cahill left New York Red Bulls by mutual agreement.

=== Shanghai Shenhua ===
Following his departure from New York Red Bulls, Cahill signed with Chinese club Shanghai Shenhua. On 9 March 2015, Cahill debuted for Shanghai Shenhua in the team's opening game of the 2015 Chinese Super League season, a 6–2 win over rivals Shanghai Shenxin. Shanghai Shenhua also went to the Chinese FA Cup final in which they were defeated by Jiangsu Guoxin-Sainty after extra time.

On 16 February 2016, Cahill announced on social media that he had terminated his contract with Shanghai by mutual agreement upon being told that he was not part of new coach Gregorio Manzano's plans for the 2016 Chinese Super League season.

=== Hangzhou Greentown ===
On 22 February 2016, it was reported that Cahill signed with Chinese Super League club Hangzhou Greentown. On 6 March 2016, Cahill scored a penalty on his Hangzhou Greentown debut in a 2–1 win against Changchun Yatai. Cahill decided to come back to Australia for his family in the summer of 2016. On 14 July 2016, he had his contract terminated by mutual consent.

=== Melbourne City ===
On 11 August 2016, Cahill signed a three-year contract with A-League club Melbourne City, with the plan to play the first two years and then take on a coaching role for the third year. Cahill made his debut in the FFA Cup on 24 August as a 64th-minute substitute against Brisbane Strikers. In his second game for Melbourne City, he scored and got an assist in a 4–1 win in the FFA Cup quarter final against Western Sydney Wanderers. Cahill made his A-League debut in a Melbourne Derby against Melbourne Victory on 15 October. He opened the scoring with a spectacular volley into the top corner from 35 metres out after 27 minutes. City won the match 4–1. On 30 November, Cahill scored a trademark header in the FFA Cup Final. The victory over Sydney FC was the club's first piece of silverware.

On 4 February 2017, just as he was preparing to come on as a substitute against Melbourne Victory FC, Cahill was sent off for using "insulting, offensive, abusive language towards a match official" after he angrily disputed a goal with Chris Beath. This is the first time in Australian soccer history in which a player was sent off before entering the field of play.

On 6 December 2017, Cahill left Melbourne City after not getting enough game time, in a bid for more game time at club level to boost his chances to get selected for the Australian squad for the 2018 FIFA World Cup.

=== Return to Millwall ===
On 29 January 2018, Cahill rejoined his first professional club, Millwall, signing until the end of the 2017–18 EFL Championship season. A week after his return, he played for Millwall's under-23 team in the Professional Development League scoring a goal in their 3–2 victory over Coventry City. The following week, Cahill made his second Millwall debut, coming on in the 90th minute to a standing ovation.

He was released by Millwall at the end of the 2017–18 season. Cahill's ten appearances during this spell meant he retired having played one more league game for Millwall than Everton.

=== Jamshedpur ===
On 1 September 2018, Cahill signed with Indian Super League club Jamshedpur. However, he could not make his debut in the first game of the season against Mumbai City due to suspension in the game. He made his debut for the club in the next match, a 2–2 draw against Bengaluru. He scored his first goal for the club in a draw with Kerala Blasters, and later scored in a 2–1 win over Odisha. During February 2019, he was sidelined with a finger injury, and missed the rest of the season.

On 28 March 2019, Cahill announced his retirement from football.

== International career ==
=== Western Samoa ===
"They asked if I would take part, even though I was only 14 at the time and it was an under-20 tournament. I saw it simply as a chance to go on holiday because my grandmother was ill at the time in Samoa. It was a chance to go back and see her on expenses as the Samoans were paying for all my flights, accommodation and living expenses. I could not have cared less about playing for them. It was a men's tournament and I never expected to play."

— Cahill, speaking in 2002, on representing Western Samoa in 1994.

Although born in Sydney, Cahill had lived in Western Samoa for three years before returning to Australia as a child. The Football Federation Samoa invited Australia-based Cahill to play for the country at the 1994 OFC U-20 Championship. The competition winners would qualify for the 1995 FIFA World Youth Championship. Cahill made his debut for the under-20 team at the age of 14.

He made his debut for Western Samoa in a 3–0 loss against New Zealand coming on as a substitute. He also played against Vanuatu in another 3–0 defeat. He played alongside his older brother Sean, who was a goalkeeper. His younger brother Chris later went on to captain the country at the top national team level.

==== Change of allegiance ====
In February 2002, Cahill received an offer to play for the Republic of Ireland at the 2002 FIFA World Cup by Mick McCarthy, his former manager at Millwall. Cahill has Irish grandparents and McCarthy had hoped that Cahill would be interested. However Cahill was not eligible as he was cap-tied to Samoa.

FIFA changed its eligibility rules in 2003, allowing players capped at junior levels to switch international allegiance, meaning that Cahill was then able to play for England, Australia, the Republic of Ireland or Samoa. He chose to represent the country of his birth (Australia), declaring it a "special moment".

=== Australia ===
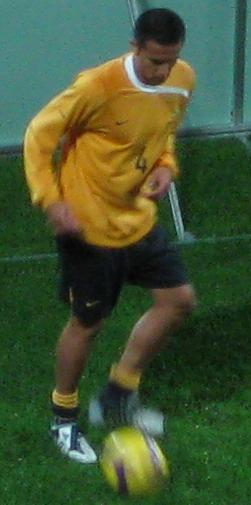
Cahill warming up before a FIFA World Cup qualifier against Qatar, in Brisbane, on 15 October 2008

Cahill made his debut for Australia in a friendly against South Africa on 30 March 2004 at Loftus Road, London. He then participated at the 2004 Olympic Games.

==== 2004 OFC Nations Cup ====
Cahill made his competitive debut for Australia at the 2004 OFC Nations Cup. Cahill finished the competition as second-highest scorer in the competition with six goals, and was the top scorer in the final round. Australia went on to win the competition for the fourth time in their history. Having won the competition, Australia were drawn against Uruguay in the World Cup qualification play-off. Cahill played in the game as Australia beat Uruguay after a penalty shoot out to qualify for the World Cup for the first time in over 30 years.

==== 2004 Summer Olympics ====
Cahill helped Australia reach the quarter-final stage of the men's football tournament at the 2004 Summer Olympics. He scored his only goal of the competition in a 5–1 win over Serbia. Australia were knocked out of the competition by Iraq following a 1–0 loss. Following his performances in the OFC Nations Cup and Summer Olympics competitions Cahill was named Oceania Footballer of the Year for 2004.

==== 2005 FIFA Confederations Cup ====
Frank Farina named Cahill in his squad for the 2005 FIFA Confederations Cup. However the tournament was not a success for the Socceroos as they were eliminated at the group stage in a group that contained Argentina, Germany and Tunisia. Tim played in all three games of Socceroos campaign.

==== 2006 FIFA World Cup ====
Cahill played in the 2006 FIFA World Cup and, in Australia's opening group game against Japan, became the first ever Australian to score a World Cup goal. Scoring a second goal in the same game, he earned man of the match honours.

Cahill also played in the group game against Brazil, which Australia lost and a drawn group game against Croatia. Cahill played the entire "round of 16" match against eventual World Cup winners Italy, which Australia lost 0–1.

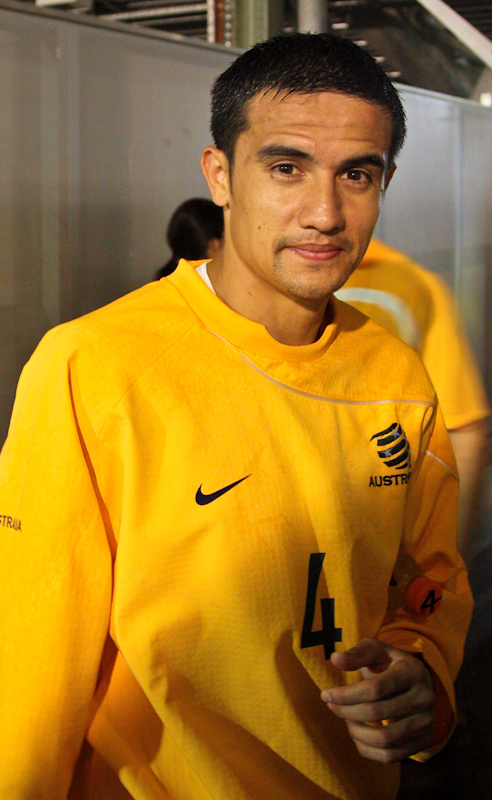
Cahill with Australia in 2009

==== 2007 Asian Cup ====
Cahill was on the Australian team which reached the quarter-finals of the 2007 AFC Asian Cup. As he was recovering from injury, Cahill was used as a substitute throughout the tournament.

==== 2010 FIFA World Cup ====
Cahill was instrumental in Australia's qualification for the 2010 FIFA World Cup, scoring goals in crucial matches against Qatar and Japan. At this time, former Australian coach Rale Rasic described Cahill as the best Australian soccer player he had seen in his lifetime.

Despite earlier injury concerns, Cahill played in Australia's opening group game at the 2010 FIFA World Cup against Germany where he controversially received a straight red card in the 56th minute, which meant he missed the group match against Ghana in Rustenburg.

Cahill played in the final group match against Serbia, where he scored in the 69th minute. After the tournament, Cahill had scored a total of three FIFA World Cup goals, which is a national record.

==== 2011 Asian Cup ====
Cahill was named to the 23-man squad for the 2011 Asian Cup campaign. The Socceroos made a bright start to the tournament by beating India 4–0, with Cahill scoring twice.

The final was played between Japan and Australia which resulted in a 1–0 loss from a 109th minute volley by Tadanari Lee.

==== 2014 FIFA World Cup ====
"It was the best goal of the World Cup and it's going to go down in history as one of the most beautiful World Cup goals."

— Ronaldo, on Cahill's World Cup goal against the Netherlands on 18 June 2014.

Cahill scored three goals during the 2014 World Cup qualifying campaign as Australia reached a third consecutive finals.

On 5 March 2014, in a pre-World Cup friendly match against Ecuador, Cahill became Australia's all-time top goalscorer with 31 goals, scoring twice in a 4–3 loss.

Cahill scored Australia's only goal in their opening group match against Chile on 13 June 2014. He joined Portuguese star Cristiano Ronaldo, Mexican defender Rafael Márquez, Dutch players Robin van Persie and Arjen Robben, German player Miroslav Klose, and American Clint Dempsey as the only players to score at the 2006, 2010 and 2014 FIFA World Cups.

On 18 June, Cahill scored Australia's first goal against the Netherlands in their 3–2 defeat; a strike which has been considered by some experts as one of the best goals ever scored in a World Cup. Cahill's goal was later nominated for the best World Cup goal in the tournament but fell short to the eventual winner James Rodríguez with his goal against Uruguay.

==== 2015 AFC Asian Cup ====
Cahill was selected under manager Ange Postecoglou as part of his squad which competed in the 2015 AFC Asian Cup. A campaign in which Australia was the host nation with matches hosted across four cities including Canberra, Brisbane, Melbourne and Newcastle, Cahill competed well in what became his nation's inaugural Asian Cup title. He scored three goals in the tournament.

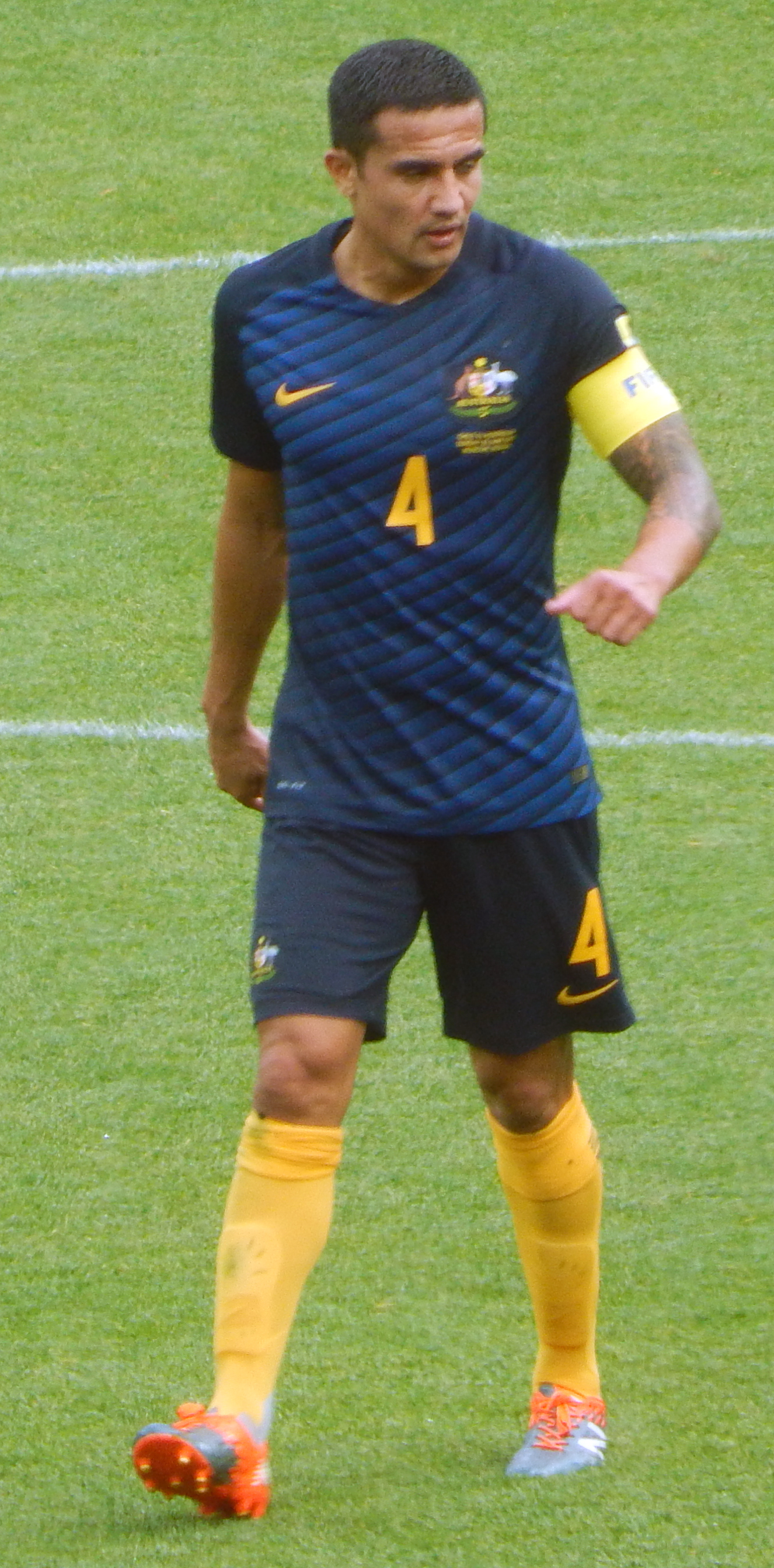
Cahill at the 2017 FIFA Confederations Cup

==== 2018 FIFA World Cup and retirement ====
Cahill was chosen to start against Jordan in a top-of-the-group clash, in which he notched a brace on 29 March 2016. Cahill scored the winning goal for the Socceroos against the United Arab Emirates in a 1–0 away victory. He helped Australia reach the inter-confederation play-offs by scoring two goals, including the winning goal in the second half of extra time (in the 19th minute of extra time) in their 2–1 second leg victory against Syria (3–2 on aggregate). On 15 November 2017, he started in the 3–1 win over Honduras which saw Australia clinch a spot in the 2018 FIFA World Cup.

In May 2018, Cahill was named in the World Cup squad by coach Bert van Marwijk and made a single appearance in the tournament, coming off the bench in the 63rd minute of the 2–0 loss against Peru.

On 16 July 2018, Cahill announced his retirement from international soccer, subsequently overturned with the decision to participate in one final home friendly against Lebanon in November 2018. He retired with 50 goals (a national team record) in 108 games (the second highest, and just three behind Mark Schwarzer).

== Personal life ==
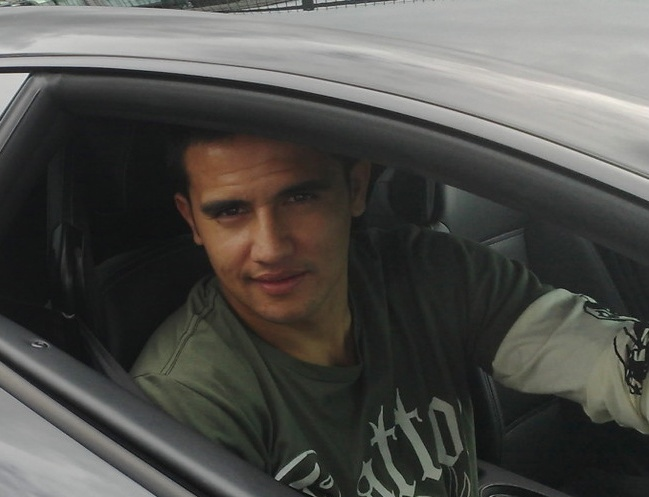
Cahill in 2008

Cahill became involved with two soccer academies in 2009, one based in Wollongong, Australia in partnership with Wollongong Police and Community Youth Club, and another in partnership with 'Elite Sporting Academy' in Dubai.

Cahill has featured in EA Sports' FIFA video game series, and has featured as a cover star on several editions of the game.

In 2010 Cahill married his childhood sweetheart Rebekah Greenfield in Las Vegas, en route to Sydney. The couple have four children, Kyah (son, born 2003), Shae (son, born 26 April 2005), Sienna (daughter, born 2007) and Cruz (son, born 2 September 2012). As of 2015, the Cahills owned homes in Sydney, Florida, New York, Shanghai, and England.

Cahill is heavily involved with the UNICEF children's charity.

In June 2013, the Cahill Expressway in Sydney was temporarily renamed the Tim Cahill Expressway in his honour ahead of the Socceroos' 2014 FIFA World Cup qualification match against Iraq. Football Federation Australia representatives suggested the name change should be made permanently should Cahill score the goal that led to Australia's qualification for the 2014 World Cup.

Cahill's business career is diverse across a range of industries. BRW quoted his net worth to be $28 million in 2014.

Cahill lived in Saddle River, New Jersey while playing for the Red Bulls.

Cahill was officially announced as an ambassador for Australia's Securities Broker ACY Securities on 30 October 2019.

In 2021, Cahill joined the board of directors of K.A.S. Eupen.

In 2022, Cahill was hired as the sporting executive of the FIA-sanctioned international off-road racing series Extreme E team XE Sports Group. XE Sports Group is due to join the 2023 Extreme E season.

In 2024, Cahill was widely rumoured to be the new CEO of Malaysia's national football team. However, he was instead named as the personal advisor to Tunku Ismail Idris, the Regent of Johor, regarding matters of sports and international relations.

== Career statistics ==
=== Club ===
Appearances and goals by club, season and competition
Club	Season	League			National cup (Note: Includes FA Cup, US Open Cup, Chinese FA Cup and FFA Cup.)		League cup (Note: Includes League Cup.)		Continental		Other		Total	
Club	Season	Division	Apps	Goals	Apps	Goals	Apps	Goals	Apps	Goals	Apps	Goals	Apps	Goals
Sydney United	1997	NSW Super League	2	0	—		—		—		—		2	0
Millwall	1997–98	Division Two	1	0	0	0	0	0	—		0	0	1	0
Millwall	1998–99	Division Two	36	6	0	0	1	0	—		4 (Note: Appearance(s) in Football League Trophy)	0	41	6
Millwall	1999–2000	Division Two	45	12	1	0	2	0	—		3 (Note: Two appearance in league play-offs; one appearances in Football League Trophy)	0	51	12
Millwall	2000–01	Division Two	41	9	2	0	4	1	—		1	0	48	10
Millwall	2001–02	Division One	43	13	2	0	2	0	—		2 (Note: Appearances in league play-offs)	0	49	13
Millwall	2002–03	Division One	11	3	0	0	0	0	—		0	0	11	3
Millwall	2003–04	Division One	40	9	7	3	1	0	—		0	0	48	12
Millwall	Total		217	52	12	3	10	1	0	0	10	0	249	56
Everton	2004–05	Premier League	33	11	2	1	3	0	—		—		38	12
Everton	2005–06	Premier League	32	6	3	1	0	0	4	1	—		39	8
Everton	2006–07	Premier League	18	5	0	0	3	2	—		—		21	7
Everton	2007–08	Premier League	18	7	0	0	4	1	6	2	—		28	10
Everton	2008–09	Premier League	30	8	7	1	1	0	2	0	—		40	9
Everton	2009–10	Premier League	33	8	2	1	1	0	7	1	—		43	10
Everton	2010–11	Premier League	27	9	1	0	0	0	—		—		28	9
Everton	2011–12	Premier League	35	2	4	1	2	0	—		—		41	3
Everton	Total		226	56	19	5	14	3	19	4	0	0	278	68
New York Red Bulls	2012	Major League Soccer	12	1	0	0	—		–		2 (Note: Appearances in MLS Cup Playoffs)	0	14	1
New York Red Bulls	2013	Major League Soccer	27	11	0	0	—		–		2	1	29	12
New York Red Bulls	2014	Major League Soccer	23	2	0	0	—		1 (Note: Appearance in CONCACAF Champions League)	0	5	1	29	3
New York Red Bulls	Total		62	14	0	0	0	0	1	0	9	2	72	16
Shanghai Shenhua	2015	Chinese Super League	28	11	6	1	—		—		—		34	12
Hangzhou Greentown	2016	Chinese Super League	17	4	0	0	—		—		—		17	4
Melbourne City	2016–17	A-League	21	11	4	2	—		—		1 (Note: Appearance in A-League Finals)	0	26	13
Melbourne City	2017–18	A-League	6	0	1	0	—		—		—		7	0
Melbourne City	Total		27	11	5	2	0	0	0	0	1	0	33	13
Millwall	2017–18	Championship	10	0	0	0	0	0	—		0	0	10	0
Jamshedpur	2018–19	Indian Super League	12	2	—		0	0	0	0	—		12	2
Career total			601	150	42	11	24	4	20	4	20	2	707	171

=== International ===
Appearances and goals by national team and year
National team	Year	Apps	Goals
Australia	2004	5	7
Australia	2005	9	1
Australia	2006	8	3
Australia	2007	5	1
Australia	2008	3	2
Australia	2009	7	5
Australia	2010	9	2
Australia	2011	9	3
Australia	2012	5	2
Australia	2013	6	3
Australia	2014	10	7
Australia	2015	12	9
Australia	2016	6	3
Australia	2017	10	2
Australia	2018	4	0
Total		108	50

== Honours ==
Millwall

- Football League Second Division: 2000–01
- FA Cup runner-up: 2003–04
- Football League Trophy runner-up: 1998–99

Everton

- FA Cup runner-up: 2008–09

New York Red Bulls

- MLS Supporter's Shield: 2013

Shanghai Shenhua

- Chinese FA Cup runner-up: 2015

Melbourne City

- Australia Cup (FFA Cup): 2016

Australia

- AFC Asian Cup: 2015; runner-up: 2011
- OFC Nations Cup: 2004

Individual

- Ballon d'Or (nominee): 2006
- FIFA Puskás Award (nominee): 2014
- Oceania Footballer of the Year: 2004
- Professional Footballers Australia Men's Footballer of the Year: 2008–09
- FIFA World Cup Man of the Match:
  - 2006: vs Japan (GS)
  - 2010: vs Serbia (GS)
- AFC Asian Cup Goal of the tournament: 2015
- AFC Asian Cup Team of the tournament: 2015
- AFC Opta All-time XI at the FIFA World Cup: 2020
- AFC Asian Cup All-time XI: 2023
- PFA Team of the Year: 2000–01 Second Division, 2003–04 First Division
- Everton Player of the Season: 2004–05
- Everton Players' Player of the Season: 2004–05
- Everton Top Goalscorer of the Season: 2004–05
- New York Red Bulls Most Valuable Player: 2013
- New York Red Bulls Goal of the Year: 2013
- New York Red Bulls Golden boot: 2013
- MLS Player of the Week 2013 (Week 9)
- MLS Best XI: 2013
- MLS All-Stars: 2014
- Best MLS Player ESPY Award: 2014
- A-League Goal of the Year: 2016–17
- Australia's Greatest Ever Team: 2012
- Football Australia Team of the Century
- Sport Australia Hall of Fame: 2023

Achievements

- First Australian to score at the World Cup Finals
- First Australian to score at the Asian Cup Finals
- First Australian to be honoured a FIFA World Cup Man of the match award
- First Australian to score at three FIFA World Cups: 2006, 2010, 2014
- Most Goals by an Australian at the Asian Cup Finals (see List of AFC Asian Cup Goalscorers)
- Australia's oldest ever goalscorer: (37 years and 308 days) goals against Syria in 2017
- First Everton player since Neville Southall in 1988 to be nominated for the Ballon d'Or
- First Everton player since Dixie Dean in 1931 to score in three separate Merseyside derbies at Anfield
- Has scored more post-war league goals against Liverpool than any other Everton player
- Has the record for scoring the fastest goal in MLS history. On 20 October 2013, Cahill scored within the first 7 seconds of the game against Houston Dynamo

Orders

- Officer of the Order of Australia (AO): 2021

== See also ==
- List of top international men's football goalscorers by country
- List of men's footballers with 100 or more international caps
- List of men's footballers with 50 or more international goals
- List of FIFA World Cup top goalscorers
- List of Australia international soccer players
