= Demba Ba =

Senegalese-French footballer (born 1985)

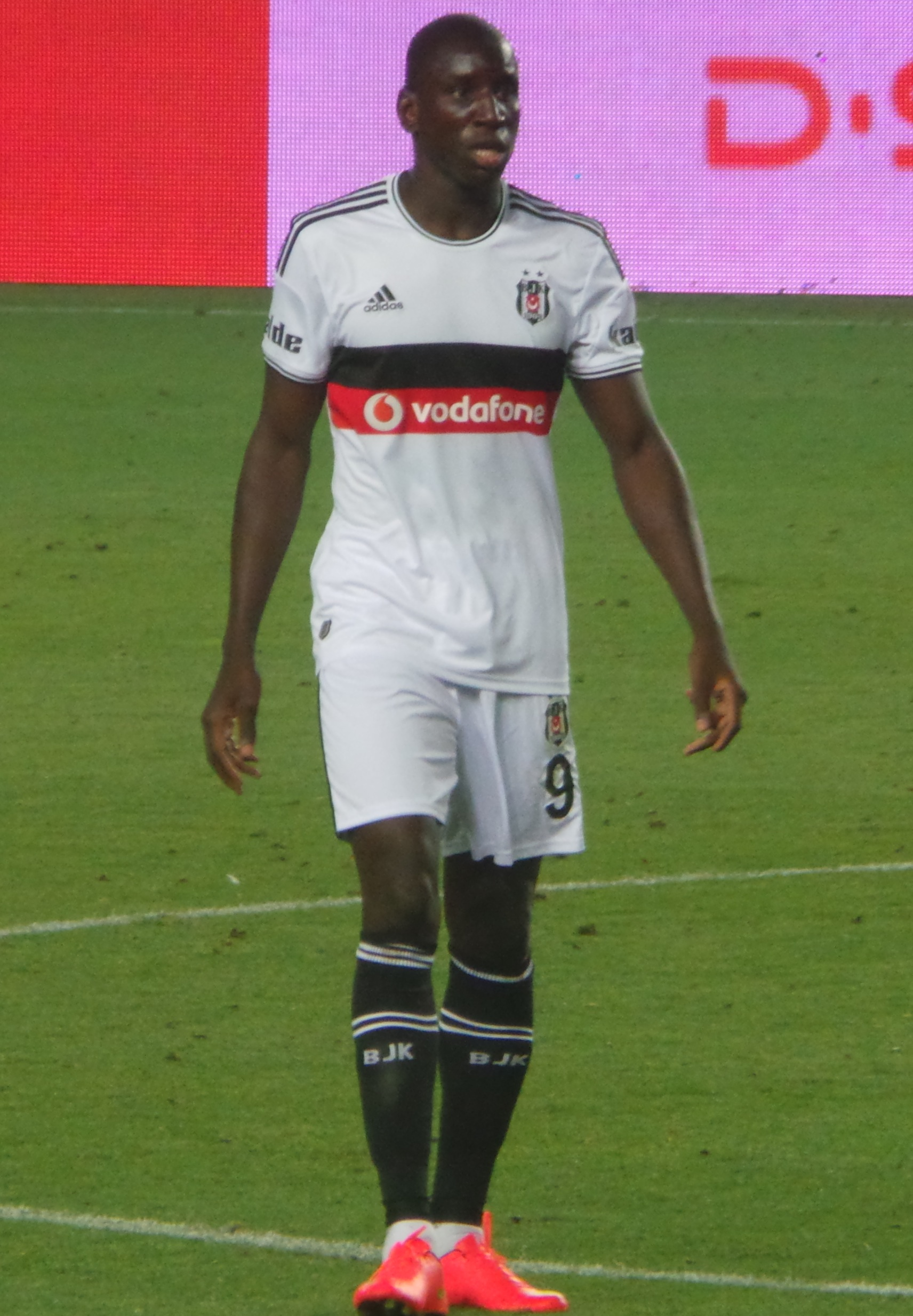
- Ba with Beşiktaş in 2014

Personal information
- Full name: Demba Ba
- Date of birth: 25 May 1985 (age 41)
- Place of birth: Sèvres, France
- Height: 1.89 m (6 ft 2 in)
- Position: Striker

Youth career
- 1992–1999: ES Mont-Gaillard
- 1999–2000: Port Autonome
- 2000–2001: Frileuse
- 2001–2004: Montrouge

Senior career*
Years	Team	Apps	(Gls)
2005–2006	Rouen	26	(22)
2006–2007	Mouscron	12	(8)
2007–2011	TSG Hoffenheim	97	(37)
2011	West Ham United	12	(7)
2011–2013	Newcastle United	54	(29)
2013–2014	Chelsea	33	(7)
2014–2015	Beşiktaş	29	(18)
2015–2018	Shanghai Greenland Shenhua	29	(20)
2017	→ Beşiktaş (loan)	2	(1)
2018	Göztepe	13	(7)
2018	Shanghai Greenland Shenhua	17	(5)
2019–2021	İstanbul Başakşehir	59	(20)
2021	Lugano	3	(0)
Total		386	(181)

International career
2007–2015	Senegal	22	(3)
- * Club domestic league appearances and goals

Demba Ba (born 25 May 1985) is a former professional footballer. Born in France, he played as a striker and represented the Senegal national team. He serves as the chairman of National Independent Soccer Association side Albion San Diego.

He made his first-team debut with French team Rouen in 2005 before moving to Mouscron and then TSG Hoffenheim in Germany in 2007. In 2011, he moved to Premier League side West Ham United. He played only 12 games for West Ham and despite being their league top goal scorer in the 2010–11 season, they were relegated to the Championship and Ba moved to Newcastle United. In January 2013, he completed a move to Chelsea for an undisclosed fee, before joining Beşiktaş for €6 million 18 months later in 2014. After one season in Turkey, he moved to Shanghai Shenhua of the Chinese Super League, in a spell that included a loan move back to Beşiktaş. He then had a short spell with Göztepe in Turkey, before rejoining Shanghai Shenhua. He remained there for half a season before returning to Turkey with İstanbul Başakşehir, where he would remain for two seasons. After a short spell with Lugano in Switzerland, he retired from professional football in September 2021.

Born and raised in France, Ba was a full international for Senegal from 2007 to 2015 and represented the country at the 2012 Africa Cup of Nations.

== Early career ==
Ba was born in Sèvres, Hauts-de-Seine and is the sixth child of seven. He grew up in Saint-Valery-en-Caux, Seine-Maritime. He joined the youth section of ES Mont-Gaillard, located in Le Havre, in 1992, before playing for Port Autonome between 1999 and 2000, and then for Frileuse between 2000 and 2001.

In 2001, Ba returned to Châtillon and played for Montrouge. He played there until 2004, at which point he decided to concentrate on his football. Later that year, after unsuccessful trials at Lyon and Auxerre, Ba moved to the United Kingdom to seek a professional contract. He was recommended to Watford manager Ray Lewington through his friend Gauthier Diafutua, then a Watford player, but released shortly after Lewington's dismissal. Ba then spent a week on trial at Barnsley, and returned to France after two more unsuccessful trials at Football League sides Swansea City and Gillingham.

== Club career ==
=== Rouen ===
Ba signed with manager Alain Michel because they were both moving to French club Rouen on a one-year contract, and Ba enjoyed a highly successful season with the club.

=== Mouscron ===
Belgian club Mouscron beat off competition from numerous other clubs to win Ba's signature in 2006. Scoring in each of his first three games, he then picked up fractures in his tibia and fibula, and was out of action between August 2006 and April 2007. Following his eight-month recovery period he scored seven goals in nine games, and picked up his first international cap.

=== TSG Hoffenheim ===
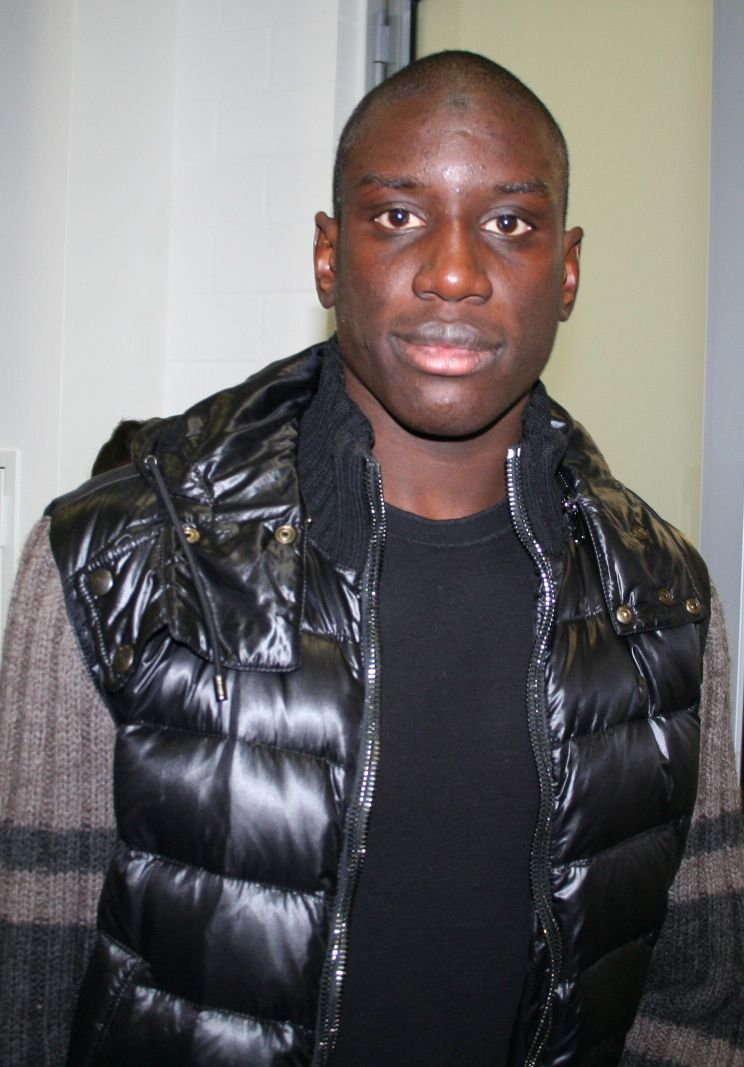
Ba, pictured in 2009

On 29 August 2007, Ba moved to 2. Bundesliga side TSG Hoffenheim for €3 million. Ba was an integral part of Hoffenheim's promotion to the Bundesliga and their successful first season in the Bundesliga, where they finished seventh after leading during the Christmas break. In that season he scored 14 goals, only missing one game all season. These goals included a hat-trick in a 3–3 game against Stuttgart on 24 February 2009. In all competitions Ba scored 40 goals in 103 appearances for TSG Hoffenheim. In July 2009, he was due to move to VfB Stuttgart, but the move fell through after he failed a medical. In December of that year Ba extended his contract at Hoffenheim to 2013.

==== Move to England ====
Ba left Hoffenheim for disputed reasons in January 2011. Claiming the club had gone back on an agreed transfer to a Premier League club, believed to be West Ham United, he refused to travel to Hoffenheim's winter training camp. In response, Hoffenheim's general manager said his contract would be cancelled, he would face legal action, and he would be fined and prevented from moving to another club for six months. The club also later claimed he travelled to England without permission in order to force a move, which they reluctantly agreed needs to happen due to Ba's actions. The club later agreed to a transfer to Stoke City for a reported fee of £7.1 million, but it fell through after Ba had agreed personal terms but failed his medical for undisclosed reasons. Expressing disappointment, Stoke City manager Tony Pulis said "Obviously they found something which could cause problems later".

After leaving Hoffenheim, the club's general manager Ernst Tanner stated the club stand by their decision selling Ba.

=== West Ham United ===
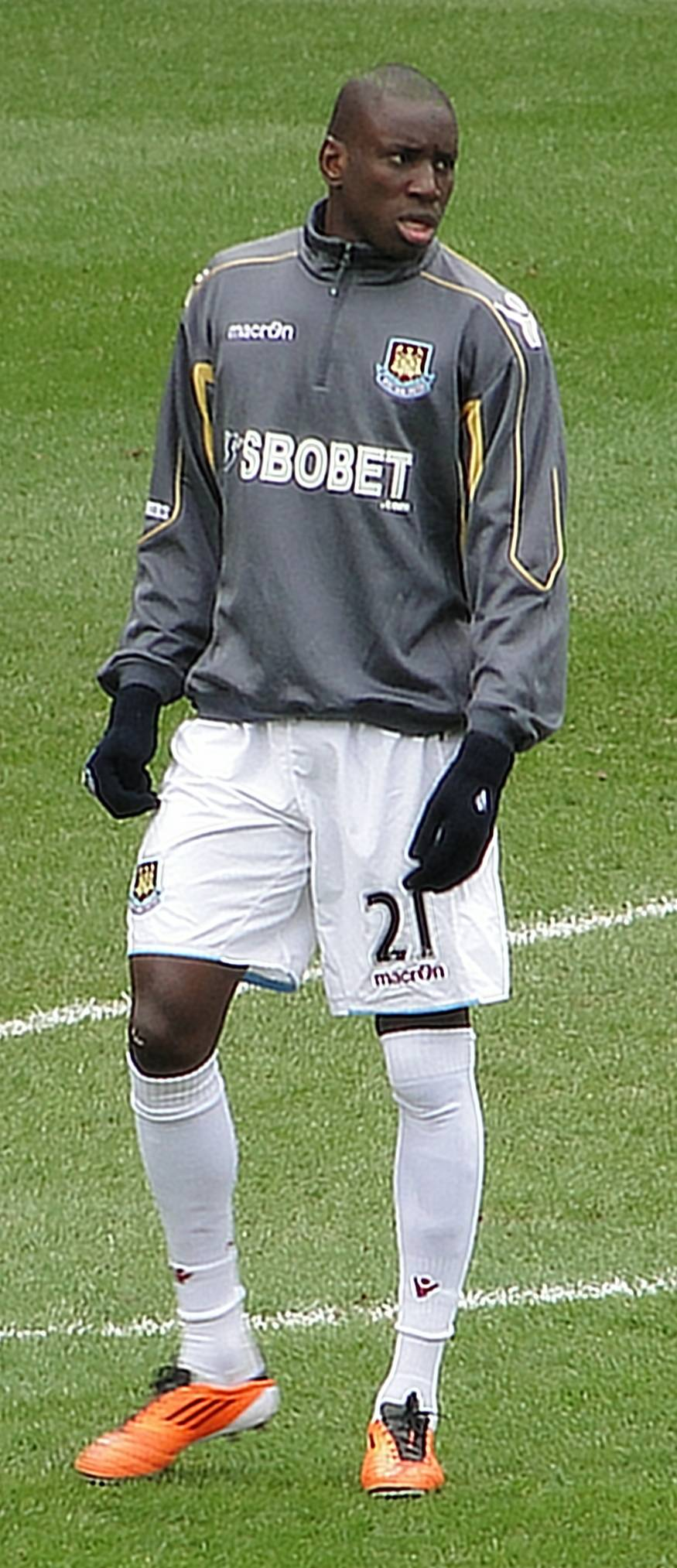
Ba with West Ham United in 2011

After the collapsed Stoke deal, Ba was sold to West Ham United for an undisclosed fee based on appearances. He signed a three-year contract on 28 January, on a pay as you play basis due to knee problems found in the Stoke medical. Ba's Premier League debut came on 6 February 2011, as a 75th-minute substitute for Robbie Keane during a 1–0 home defeat by Birmingham City. His first goals followed six days later during his full debut, scoring twice in a 3–3 draw against West Bromwich Albion. Despite finishing as their top scorer for the season with seven from twelve games including 2 in the last game, Ba's stay with West Ham proved to be short. Following their relegation to the Championship after a 3–2 loss away to Wigan Athletic he invoked a release clause in his contract allowing him to leave for free. He turned down a £50,000-a-week salary plus a bonus payment of £500,000 in order to stay in the Premier League with another club, triggering interest from both Everton and Newcastle United.

=== Newcastle United ===
==== 2011–12 season ====
On 17 June 2011, Ba signed for Newcastle United on a three-year deal, making his club debut on 13 August 2011 in the 0–0 draw against Arsenal. His first goals for the club came on 24 September 2011 with a hat-trick against Blackburn Rovers in a 3–1 home win. A second hat-trick came in a 3–1 away win at Stoke City, taking his league total to 8 and maintaining the club's 11-game unbeaten league start, taking them to 3rd in the league. Ba's goalscoring form continued despite Newcastle entering a downward spell, and saw him picked in ESPN.com's Premier League Best XI for the first half of the season, and named Premier League Player of the Month for December 2011.

By the time Ba left to play in the January 2012 Africa Cup of Nations his league tally had reached 15, making him second top scorer in the league behind Arsenal's Robin van Persie. He left for the tournament on a high note, scoring the first in a 3–0 home win over Manchester United on 4 January 2012, the team's first victory against the league champions in over a decade. While at the Africa Cup of Nations tournament, Ba's Senegal teammate Papiss Cissé also signed for Newcastle. Ba and Cissé returned earlier than expected after Senegal finished bottom of their group, with Ba having missed three Premier League games and two FA Cup games, the second of which saw Newcastle knocked out of the cup. He returned to action against Aston Villa on their visit to St James' Park on 5 February 2012, his return proved to be a goal scoring one as he netted the opener in the game which Newcastle won 2–1. This would prove to be Ba's last goal of the season, as he moved to the left of a three pronged attack with Papiss Cissé leading the line, and grabbing 12 goals in the second half of the season. Despite this late season slump, Ba was voted as the best signing of the 2011–12 season by Premier League managers in March 2012. He finished the season as Newcastle's leading goal scorer, with 16 goals.

==== 2012–13 season ====
Ba got his season off to a strong start scoring in a 1–0 win against Monaco, in Landsberg am Lech, Germany on 16 July 2012. He also scored in a 2–1 win against Braga which helped Newcastle win the Guadiana Trophy. In Newcastle's first league game against Tottenham, Ba opened the scoring with a fantastic volleyed effort in a 2–1 win. On 17 September 2012, he scored Newcastle's 1000th goal of the Premier League era, after scoring both goals in a 2–2 draw against Everton at Goodison Park. On 29 September, he scored for the third game in a row as he scored twice in a 2–2 draw away to Reading, the first a volley, the second however proved controversial as the ball struck his arm before going in.

It was known that Ba had a release clause in his contract valued at £7 million causing speculation of him making a transfer to Chelsea. This speculation was confirmed by Newcastle manager Alan Pardew on 2 January 2013 who said that the transfer was "done" and Ba would "go to Chelsea with our blessing."

=== Chelsea ===
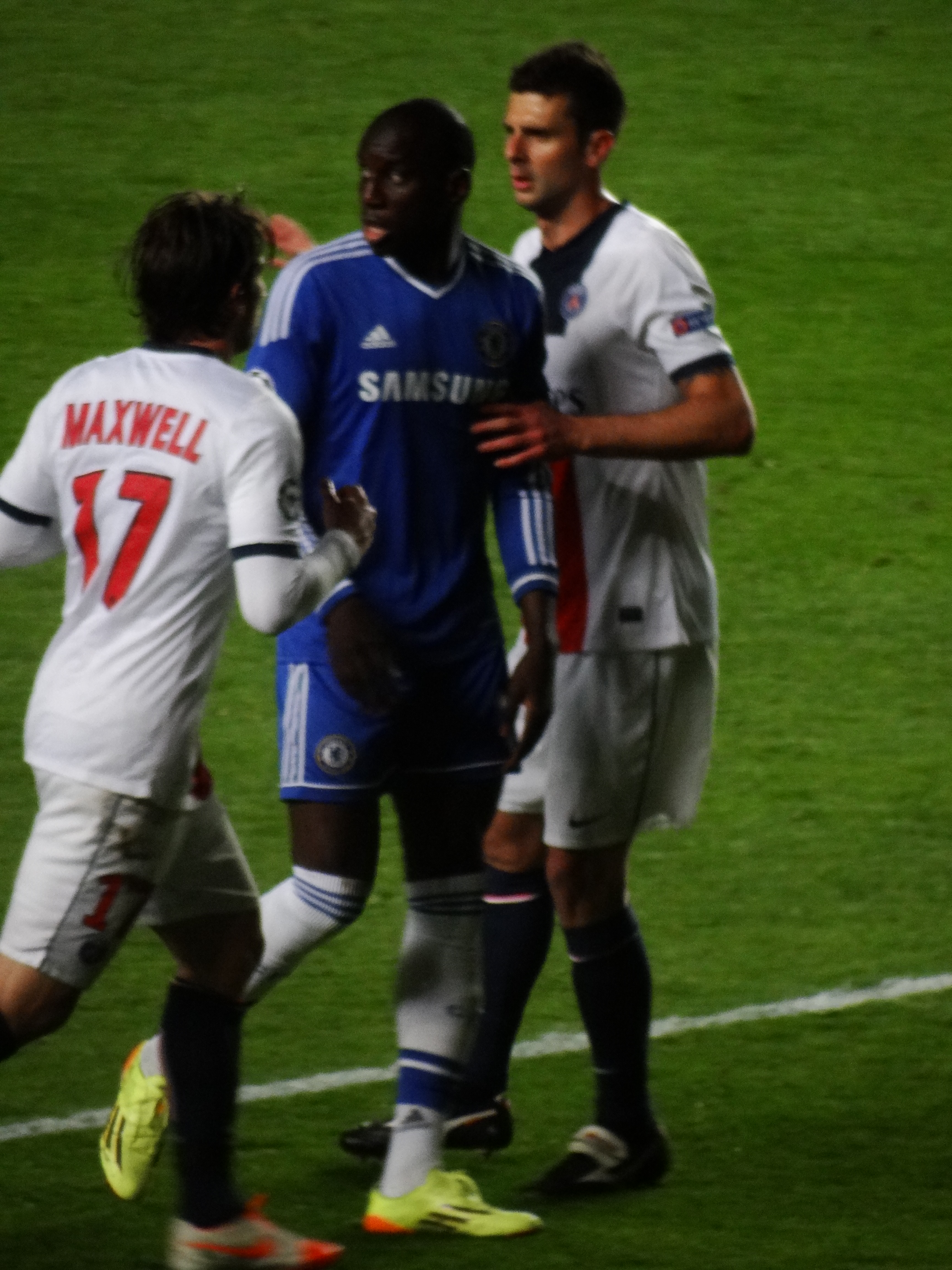
Ba playing for Chelsea in 2014

==== 2012–13 season ====
On 4 January 2013, Ba joined Chelsea for an undisclosed fee. Ba signed a three-and-a-half-year contract. He received the vacant number 29 shirt. Ba made his debut against Southampton in the third round of the FA Cup on 5 January. He marked his first appearance for the club by scoring two goals in a 5–1 victory for Chelsea. He scored on his home league debut on 16 January in a 2–2 draw, also against Southampton.

On 2 February 2013, Ba first played his former team Newcastle in a Premier League match at St. James' Park. In the 32nd minute of the match Ba had a chance to open the scoring but his initial attempt on goal was saved by Newcastle keeper Tim Krul. Ba managed to head the rebounded ball and in doing so collided with Coloccini. The collision resulted in a broken nose and Ba was substituted in the 43rd minute. Newcastle went on to win the game 3–2. After a run of seven games without scoring, Ba scored in a 1–0 win against West Bromwich Albion at Stamford Bridge on 2 March. On 1 April, Ba scored a goal from a long Juan Mata cross in the FA Cup quarter-final replay against Manchester United, giving Chelsea a 1–0 victory and a spot at Wembley against Manchester City in the semi-finals of the competition. He was cup-tied for Chelsea's victorious 2012–13 UEFA Europa League campaign.

==== 2013–14 season ====
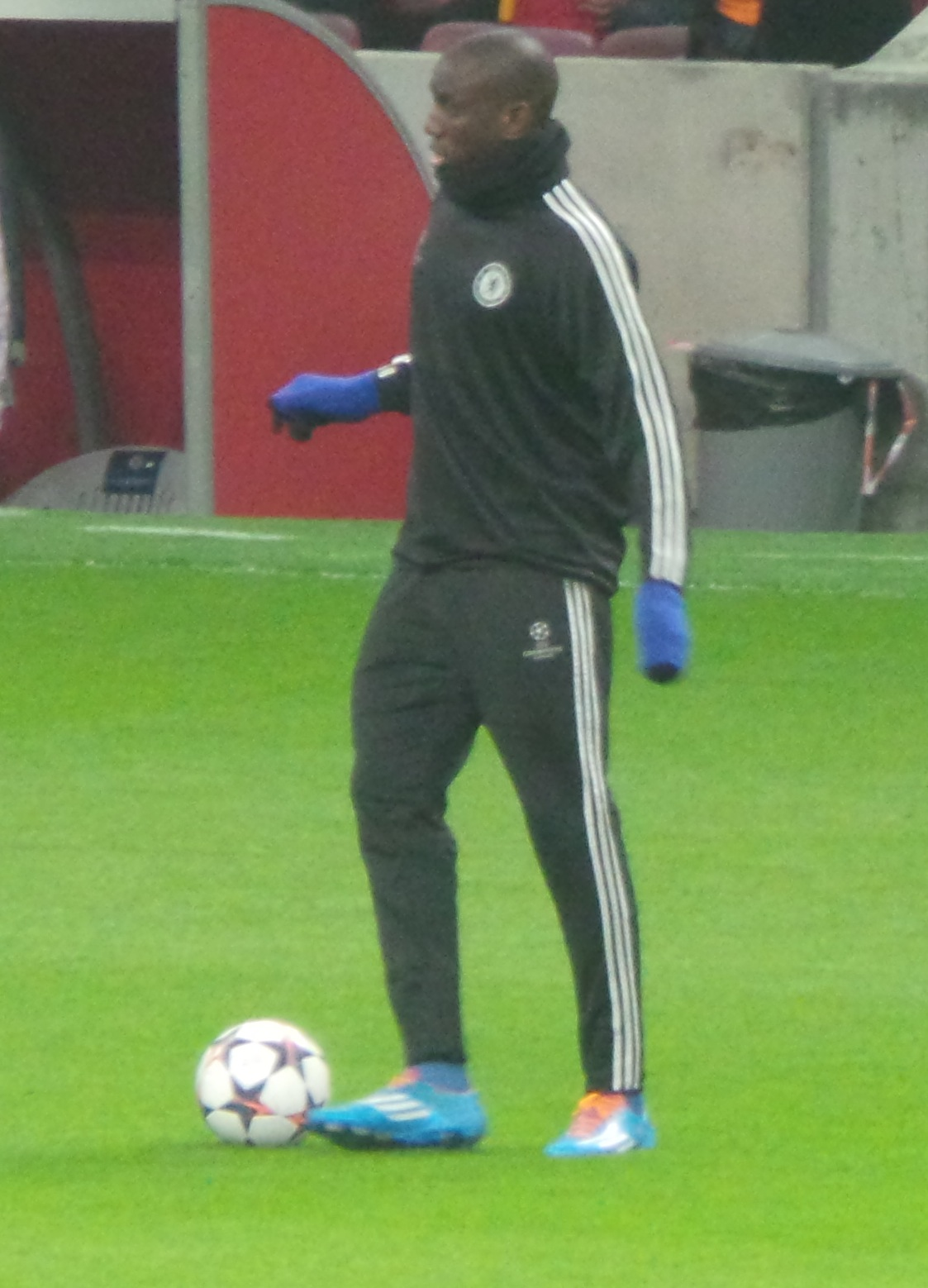
Ba training with Chelsea before a Champions League match

For the 2013–14 season, Ba's squad number was switched from 29 to 19, his squad number while at Newcastle. In the summer transfer window, Ba was linked with transfers to his former clubs Newcastle United and West Ham United. Ba was on the verge of joining Arsenal on a season-long loan, but the move fell through. It was later revealed that the move fell through thanks to Chelsea intervention, though Ba himself considered moving to Arsenal.

He scored his first goal of the season after coming on as a substitute in Champions League match against Schalke in a 3–0 victory. Ba's first Premier League goal of the season sealed Chelsea's 3–1 victory over Southampton. He made his first Champions League start on 11 December 2013 and he scored the only goal of the game, as Chelsea won 1–0 against Steaua București. On 8 March 2014, he scored twice after coming on as a 76th-minute substitute in a 4–0 win over Tottenham Hotspur.

On 8 April 2014, Ba scored an 87th-minute goal in the Champions League quarter-final second-leg against Paris Saint-Germain to send Chelsea through to the semi-finals. On 13 April, he scored the winning goal as Chelsea won 1–0 at Swansea City. On 27 April, during Chelsea's third final match against Liverpool, Steven Gerrard slipped over while receiving a pass which allowed Ba to score, resulting in Chelsea winning the game 2–0, helping them to stay in the race for the Premier League title. Having only scored 14 goals since his arrival in January 2013, Ba fell behind fellow strikers Samuel Eto'o and Fernando Torres, having spent most of the season being on the sidelines. After the arrival of Diego Costa in the summer, Chelsea decided to allow Ba to search for a new club despite his intention to stay for the 2014–15 season.

=== Beşiktaş ===
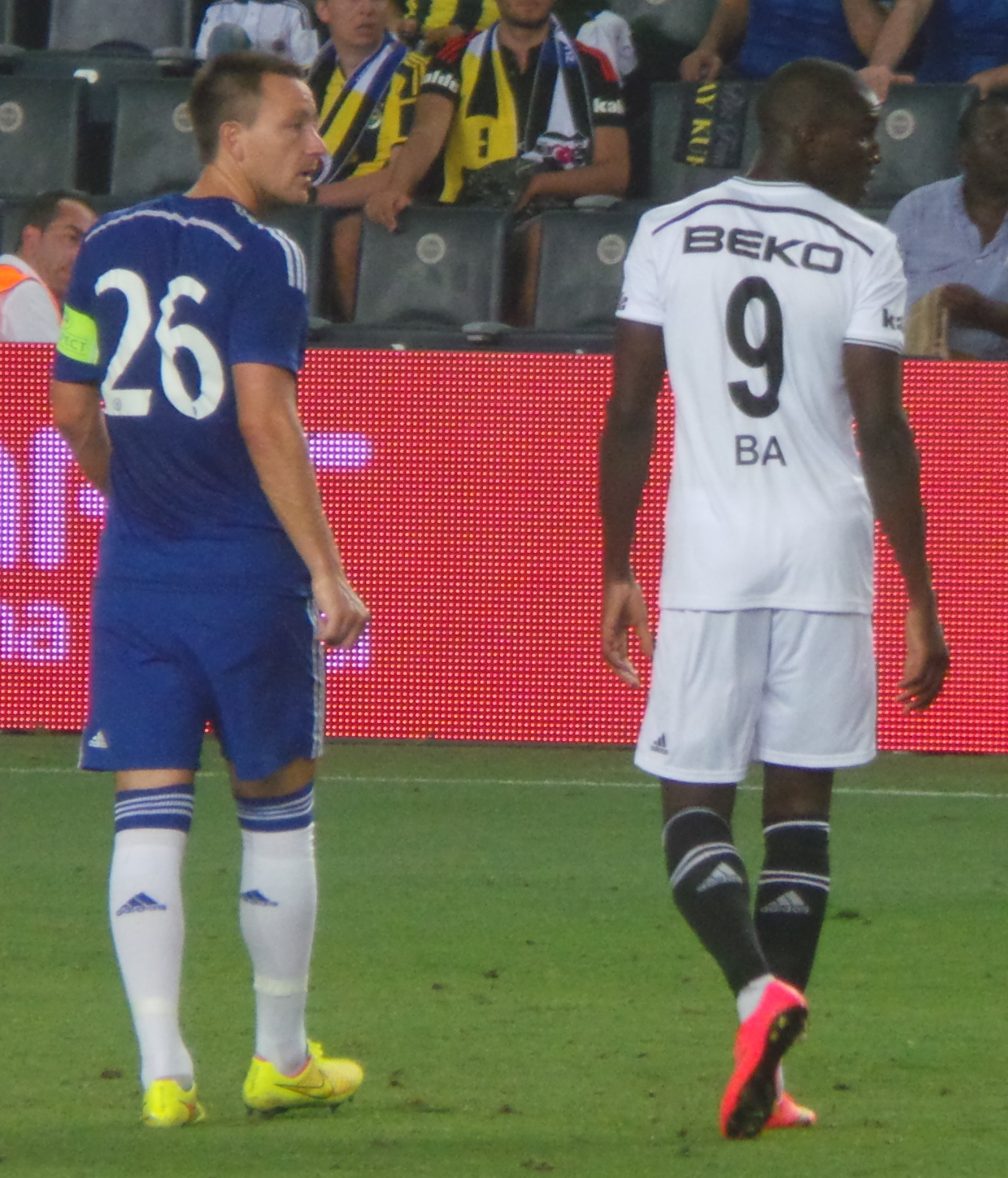
Ba playing against former teammate John Terry in 2014

On 16 July 2014, Beşiktaş J.K. of the Turkish Süper Lig signed Ba from Chelsea for €6 million. He was given the number 9 shirt.

Ba made his official competitive debut for the club against Feyenoord in the first-leg of third qualifying round of the 2014–15 UEFA Champions League, coming on as a substitute for Oğuzhan Özyakup in the 59th minute, as the match ended 2–1 for Beşiktaş. In the second-leg in Istanbul, which was the first time he was in the starting eleven, Ba scored three goals, marking his first hat-trick with the Turkish club in which ended 3–1. On 19 August, Ba tried a straight shot right after the kick-off, which was saved by Arsenal keeper Wojciech Szczęsny at Play-off Round first leg, which ended 0–0.

Ba made a great start to Turkish top flight and scored eight times in 10 games for Besiktas over the first twelve weeks of the season. In UEFA Europa League, Ba proved to be instrumental for Besiktas' success and managed to score five times in five games while Besiktas advanced for the knockout phase.

=== Shanghai Shenhua ===
On 28 June 2015, it was confirmed that Ba had signed a three-year deal with Chinese Super League club Shanghai Shenhua. He made his debut on 11 July, starting in a 1–1 draw at Tianjin Teda, and scored his first goal four days later in a 3–1 home win over Beijing Guoan. Ba finished the season with six goals in 11 games, including a hat-trick in the final game on 31 October, a 3–1 win over Jiangsu Sainty, also at the Hongkou Stadium. Although Shanghai lost to Jiangsu Sainty in the 2015 Chinese FA Cup final, Ba won the titles of 2015 Chinese FA Cup Most Valuable Player and Top Scorer.

In Ba's second season at Shanghai Shenhua, he scored 14 goals in 18 Super League games, including hat-tricks in wins against Shijiazhuang Ever Bright on 3 April 2016, and Hangzhou Greentown on 19 June. On 17 July, Ba broke his leg during a match against Shanghai SIPG when he was knocked off balance by Sun Xiang and fell with his leg twisting under him. Shenhua coach Gregorio Manzano stated the injury could potentially "end his professional career." French doctor Olivier Bringer performed surgery on Ba's fractured leg successfully on 22 July. After the operation, Bringer affirmed that Ba would be able to play football in a few months.

=== Return to Turkey ===
On 31 January 2017, Beşiktaş confirmed that Ba will join the club on loan from Shanghai Shenhua until May 2017. On 31 January 2018, Ba joined Turkish Süper Lig side Göztepe S.K. on a free transfer. Ba scored seven goals and assisted one goal in 13 matches before rejoining Shanghai Shenhua.

=== Return to Shanghai Shenhua ===
Ba rejoined Shanghai Shenhua on 14 June 2018. On 18 July 2018, he made his return debut and scored the winning goal in a 1–0 home win over Tianjin TEDA.

=== İstanbul Başakşehir ===
In January 2019, Ba terminated his contract with Shenhua by mutual consent and joined Turkish club İstanbul Başakşehir.

On 19 July 2020, Ba became a champion of Turkey for a second time in his career as Başakşehir were crowned Süper Lig champions with a 1–0 win over Kayserispor. Ba netted in Başakşehir's 2–3 defeat to Kasımpaşa on the final day of the league season, finishing the campaign as the club's top league scorer with 13 goals.

On 8 December 2020, Ba was involved in a racism row with Romanian referee Sebastian Colțescu, who was the fourth official during a Champions League match between Başakşehir and Paris Saint-Germain. Ba heard Colțescu saying "negru", confronted him and the match was abandoned when the players subsequently walked off the pitch.

=== FC Lugano ===
On 19 June 2021, Ba signed a one-year contract for Swiss Super League club FC Lugano on a free transfer. However, less than three months later on 13 September, Ba announced he had retired from professional football.

== International career ==
Ba played a total of 22 games and scored three goals for Senegal.

== Personal life ==
Ba is a practising Muslim. In 2013, He refused, like Papiss Cissé, Hatem Ben Arfa and Cheick Tioté, to wear Newcastle United's new sponsor Wonga.com's name on their shirts because it is a payday loan firm.

He observes fasting during the Islamic month of Ramadan, along with celebrating his goals by performing the Sujud by bowing towards Mecca.

In 2014, when he played for Chelsea, Ba put his jersey up for sale at auction for financing the Collective against Islamophobia in France (CCIF). He declared after the Charlie Hebdo shooting:

What happened in France ... I am a Muslim, and what happened is not Islam. I would have worn a black jersey in tribute to the victims and families. But to wear the inscription "Je suis Charlie", I would not have done it.

In 2017, Ba brought with Nicolas Anelka funding to an association created by Kémi Séba, a Pan-Africanist and anti-colonial activist with several convictions for anti-Semitism. In August 2020, Ba called on football to condemn China's treatment of Uyghurs.

On 26 June 2017, Ba co-founded with Eden Hazard, Yohan Cabaye and Moussa Sow an expansion North American Soccer League franchise, San Diego 1904 FC, to begin playing in 2018. In 2021, San Diego 1904 FC merged with Albion San Diego, which made Ba the head owner of the newly merged team.

== Career statistics ==
=== Club ===
Appearances and goals by club, season and competition
Club	Season	League			National cup (Note: Includes DFB-Pokal, FA Cup, Chinese FA Cup, Turkish Cup)		League cup (Note: Includes Football League Cup)		Continental		Other		Total	
Club	Season	Division	Apps	Goals	Apps	Goals	Apps	Goals	Apps	Goals	Apps	Goals	Apps	Goals
Rouen	2005–06	CFA	26	22	0	0	—		—		—		26	22
Mouscron	2006–07	Belgian Pro League	12	8	0	0	—		—		—		12	8
TSG Hoffenheim	2007–08	2. Bundesliga	30	12	3	0	—		—		—		33	12
TSG Hoffenheim	2008–09	Bundesliga	33	14	2	0	—		—		—		35	14
TSG Hoffenheim	2009–10	Bundesliga	17	5	1	0	—		—		—		18	5
TSG Hoffenheim	2010–11	Bundesliga	17	6	3	3	—		—		—		20	9
TSG Hoffenheim	Total		97	37	9	3	—		—		—		106	40
West Ham United	2010–11	Premier League	12	7	1	0	—		—		—		13	7
Newcastle United	2011–12	Premier League	34	16	0	0	2	0	—		—		36	16
Newcastle United	2012–13	Premier League	20	13	0	0	0	0	2 (Note: Appearances in UEFA Europa League)	0	—		22	13
Newcastle United	Total		54	29	0	0	2	0	2	0	—		58	29
Chelsea	2012–13	Premier League	14	2	6	4	2	0	0	0	0	0	22	6
Chelsea	2013–14	Premier League	19	5	1	0	3	0	6 (Note: Appearances in UEFA Champions League)	3	0	0	29	8
Chelsea	Total		33	7	7	4	5	0	6	3	0	0	51	14
Beşiktaş	2014–15	Süper Lig	29	18	3	1	—		12 (Note: Four appearances and three goals in UEFA Champions League, eight appearances and five goals in UEFA Europa League)	8	—		44	27
Shanghai Shenhua	2015	Chinese Super League	11	6	5	6	—		—		—		16	12
Shanghai Shenhua	2016	Chinese Super League	18	14	3	3	—		—		—		21	17
Shanghai Shenhua	Total		29	20	8	9	—		—		—		37	29
Beşiktaş (loan)	2016–17	Süper Lig	2	1	0	0	—		—		—		2	1
Göztepe	2017–18	Süper Lig	13	7	0	0	—		—		—		13	7
Shanghai Shenhua	2018	Chinese Super League	17	5	0	0	—		—		—		17	5
İstanbul Başakşehir	2018–19	Süper Lig	5	2	0	0	—		0	0	—		5	2
İstanbul Başakşehir	2019–20	Süper Lig	28	13	4	2	—		9	0	—		41	15
İstanbul Başakşehir	2020–21	Süper Lig	26	5	4	2	—		6	1	1 (Note: Appearance in Turkish Super Cup)	1	37	9
İstanbul Başakşehir	Total		59	20	8	4	—		15	1	1	1	83	26
Lugano	2021–22	Swiss Super League	3	0	0	0	—		—		—		3	0
Career total			386	181	36	21	7	0	35	12	1	1	465	215

=== International ===
National team	Year	Apps	Goals
Senegal	2007	5	1
Senegal	2008	0	0
Senegal	2009	2	0
Senegal	2010	2	0
Senegal	2011	2	1
Senegal	2012	5	1
Senegal	2013	1	0
Senegal	2014	4	0
Senegal	2015	1	0
Total		22	3

Scores and results list Senegal's goal tally first, score column indicates score after each Ba goal.

List of international goals scored by Demba Ba
No.	Date	Venue	Opponent	Score	Result	Competition
1.	2 June 2007	CCM Kirumba Stadium, Mwanza, Tanzania	Tanzania	1–1	1–1	2008 Africa Cup of Nations qualification
2.	26 March 2011	Stade Léopold Senghor, Dakar, Senegal	Cameroon	1–0	1–0	2012 Africa Cup of Nations qualification
3.	12 January 2012	Stade Léopold Senghor, Dakar, Senegal	Sudan	1–0	1–0	Friendly

== Honours ==
Beşiktaş

- Süper Lig: 2016–17

İstanbul Başakşehir

- Süper Lig: 2019–20

Individual

- Premier League Player of the Month: December 2011
- Chinese FA Cup Most Valuable Player: 2015
- Chinese Super League Team of the Year: 2016
