= Wang Yun (footballer) =

Chinese footballer

Wang Yun 王赟
Personal information
- Date of birth: March 28, 1983 (age 43)
- Place of birth: Shanghai, China
- Height: 1.75 m (5 ft 9 in)
- Position: Midfielder

Senior career*
Years	Team	Apps	(Gls)
2002–2010	Shanghai COSCO Huili	217	(30)
2011	Dalian Shide	5	(0)
2012–2014	Shanghai Shenxin	76	(20)
2015–2018	Shanghai Shenhua	55	(2)
2017	→ Shanghai Shenxin (loan)	9	(2)

International career^{‡}
2006	China	1	(0)

Managerial career
- 2020: Shanghai Shenhua Reserve
- 2021: Shanghai Shenhua (Assistant Coach)
- 2021-2022: China U19 (Trainer)
- * Club domestic league appearances and goals as of 20 May 2018 ‡ National team caps and goals as of 8 Sept 2012

Wang Yun (Chinese: 王赟; March 28, 1983) is a retired Chinese football player.

== Club career ==
As a young player Wang Yun was bought by Shanghai COSCO Huili (the previous name of Shaanxi Chanba) for 5,000,000 RMB, making him one of the most expensive youngsters in Chinese history. Wang Yun would go on to begin his professional career with them in the 2002 league season and quickly established himself within the squad by playing in 22 league games and scoring 5 goals. When the club started to acquire several high-profile Chinese internationals within the team Wang Yun was not only able to keep his place within the team but also establish himself as an integral member within the team that came runners-up in the 2003 Chinese Jia-A League season. When the club move away from Shanghai and towards Xi'an he would join them where he has remained with the club throughout his career and has continued to establish himself as regular until Milorad Kosanović was introduced as the club's manager during the 2010 league season and Wang Yun saw his playing time reduced.

Before the start of the 2011 Chinese Super League season Wang Yun would leave his previous club and transfer to Dalian Shide. He would then go on to make his debut for the club in the first game of the season against Guangzhou Evergrande on April 2, 2011, in a 1–0 defeat where he came on as a substitute for Yan Song.

In December 2014, Wang transferred to fellow Chinese Super League side Shanghai Shenhua. On 1 July 2017, Wang was loaned to League One club Shanghai Shenxin until 31 December 2017.

On 28 February 2019, Shanghai Shenhua announced Wang's retirement and turned as the assistant coach of the club.

== International career ==
Wang Yun made his only international appearance June 7, 2006, in a friendly against France, when he came on as a late substitute for Hao Junmin and scored an own goal in a 3–1 defeat.

== Career statistics ==
Statistics accurate as of match played 20 May 2018

Club performance			League		Cup		League Cup		Continental		Other		Total	
Season	Club	League	Apps	Goals	Apps	Goals	Apps	Goals	Apps	Goals	Apps	Goals	Apps	Goals
China PR			League		FA Cup		CSL Cup		Asia		Super Cup		Total	
2002	Shanghai COSCO Huili	Chinese Jia-A League	21	5			-		-		-		21	5
2003	Shanghai COSCO Huili	Chinese Jia-A League	23	2			-		-		-		23	2
2004	Shanghai COSCO Huili	Chinese Super League	22	3					-		-		22	3
2005	Shanghai COSCO Huili	Chinese Super League	25	7					-		-		25	7
2006	Shanghai COSCO Huili	Chinese Super League	27	2			-		-		-		27	2
2007	Shanghai COSCO Huili	Chinese Super League	24	1	-		-		-		-		24	1
2008	Shanghai COSCO Huili	Chinese Super League	29	3	-		-		-		-		29	3
2009	Shanghai COSCO Huili	Chinese Super League	27	4	-		-		-		-		27	4
2010	Shanghai COSCO Huili	Chinese Super League	19	3	-		-		-		-		19	3
2011	Dalian Shide	Chinese Super League	5	0	0	0	-		-		-		5	0
2012	Shanghai Shenxin	Chinese Super League	28	6	0	0	-		-		-		28	6
2013	Shanghai Shenxin	Chinese Super League	22	7	0	0	-		-		-		22	7
2014	Shanghai Shenxin	Chinese Super League	26	7	2	1	-		-		-		28	8
2015	Shanghai Shenhua	Chinese Super League	27	2	7	3	-		-		-		34	5
2016	Shanghai Shenhua	Chinese Super League	23	0	5	0	-		-		-		28	0
2017	Shanghai Shenhua	Chinese Super League	4	0	1	0	-		1	0	-		6	0
2017	Shanghai Shenxin (loan)	China League One	9	2	1	0	-		-		-		10	2
2018	Shanghai Shenhua	Chinese Super League	1	0	1	1	-		4	0	0	0	6	1
Total	China PR		362	54	17	5	0	0	5	0	0	0	384	59
