= Lü Zheng =

Chinese footballer

Lü Zheng 吕征
Personal information
- Full name: Lü Zheng
- Date of birth: 25 February 1985 (age 41)
- Place of birth: Beijing, China
- Height: 1.82 m (6 ft 0 in)
- Position: Right winger

Youth career
- 2001–2003: Shandong Luneng

Senior career*
Years	Team	Apps	(Gls)
2004–2014	Shandong Luneng	205	(28)
2015–2017	Shanghai Shenhua	60	(4)
2018–2020	Beijing Enterprises	17	(1)

International career^{‡}
2007–2008	China U-23		
2008–2009	China	3	(0)
Medal record
Representing China
Men's football
EAFF Championship
Bronze medal – third place	2008 China	Team
- * Club domestic league appearances and goals as of 31 December 2019 ‡ National team caps and goals as of 3 June 2015

Lü Zheng (simplified Chinese: 吕征; traditional Chinese: 呂徵; pinyin: Lǚ Zhēng; born 25 February 1985) is a retired Chinese professional footballer.

== Club career ==
Lü Zheng started his football career with Shandong Luneng when he made his debut against Shenyang Ginde on 26 June 2004 in a 1–1 draw. This led to him making several further appearances during the season, which subsequently saw him play understudy to Li Jinyu and Han Peng as the team's main strikers. Often coming on as substitute, he would see the team win several league titles and cup trophies with the 2007 season being his most productive season playing as a forward. The following season saw Lü shift positions to right winger and he gradually saw himself gain more playing time as a result as well as a playing a considerably larger part in the team's next few seasons.

On 14 December 2014, Lü transferred to fellow Chinese Super League side Shanghai Shenhua. On 8 March 2015, he made his debut for the club in a 6–2 win against Shanghai Shenxin. He scored his first goal for Shanghai on 3 June 2015 in a 3–1 away defeat against Changchun Yatai.

On 28 February 2018, Lü transferred to China League One side Beijing Enterprises.

On 17 May 2020, Lü Zheng announced his retirement from professional football.

== International career ==
Lü made his debut for the Chinese national team on 17 February 2008 in a 3–2 loss against South Korea.

== Career statistics ==
As of 31 December 2019.

Appearances and goals by club, season and competition
Club	Season	League			National Cup		League Cup		Continental		Other		Total	
Club	Season	Division	Apps	Goals	Apps	Goals	Apps	Goals	Apps	Goals	Apps	Goals	Apps	Goals
Shandong Luneng	2004	Chinese Super League	9	2	0	0	?	0	-		-		9	2
Shandong Luneng	2005	Chinese Super League	15	2	4	3	?	0	?	?	-		19	5
Shandong Luneng	2006	Chinese Super League	14	2	0	0	-		-		-		14	2
Shandong Luneng	2007	Chinese Super League	25	5	-		-		?	0	2 (Note: Appearances in A3 Champions Cup)	0	27	5
Shandong Luneng	2008	Chinese Super League	25	3	-		-		-		-		25	3
Shandong Luneng	2009	Chinese Super League	25	5	-		-		4	1	? (Note: Appearances in Pan-Pacific Championship)	0	29	6
Shandong Luneng	2010	Chinese Super League	18	2	-		-		5	0	-		23	2
Shandong Luneng	2011	Chinese Super League	21	3	3	2	-		1	0	-		25	5
Shandong Luneng	2012	Chinese Super League	16	3	2	2	-		-		-		18	5
Shandong Luneng	2013	Chinese Super League	25	2	1	0	-		-		-		26	2
Shandong Luneng	2014	Chinese Super League	9	1	1	2	-		0	0	-		10	3
Shandong Luneng	Total		202	30	11	9	0	0	10	1	2	0	225	40
Shanghai Shenhua	2015	Chinese Super League	25	2	6	1	-		-		-		31	3
Shanghai Shenhua	2016	Chinese Super League	26	2	2	0	-		-		-		28	2
Shanghai Shenhua	2017	Chinese Super League	9	0	2	0	-		0	0	-		11	0
Shanghai Shenhua	Total		60	4	10	1	0	0	0	0	0	0	70	5
Beijing Enterprises	2018	China League One	14	0	1	0	-		-		-		15	0
Beijing Enterprises	2019	China League One	3	1	1	4	-		-		-		4	5
Beijing Enterprises	Total		17	1	2	4	0	0	0	0	0	0	19	5
Career total			279	35	23	14	0	0	10	1	2	0	314	50

== Honours ==
=== Club ===
Shandong Luneng

- Chinese Super League: 2006, 2008, 2010
- Chinese FA Cup: 2004, 2006, 2014
- Chinese Super League Cup: 2004

Shanghai Shenhua

- Chinese FA Cup: 2017
