= Geng Xiaofeng =

Chinese footballer (born 1987)

Geng Xiaofeng 耿晓锋
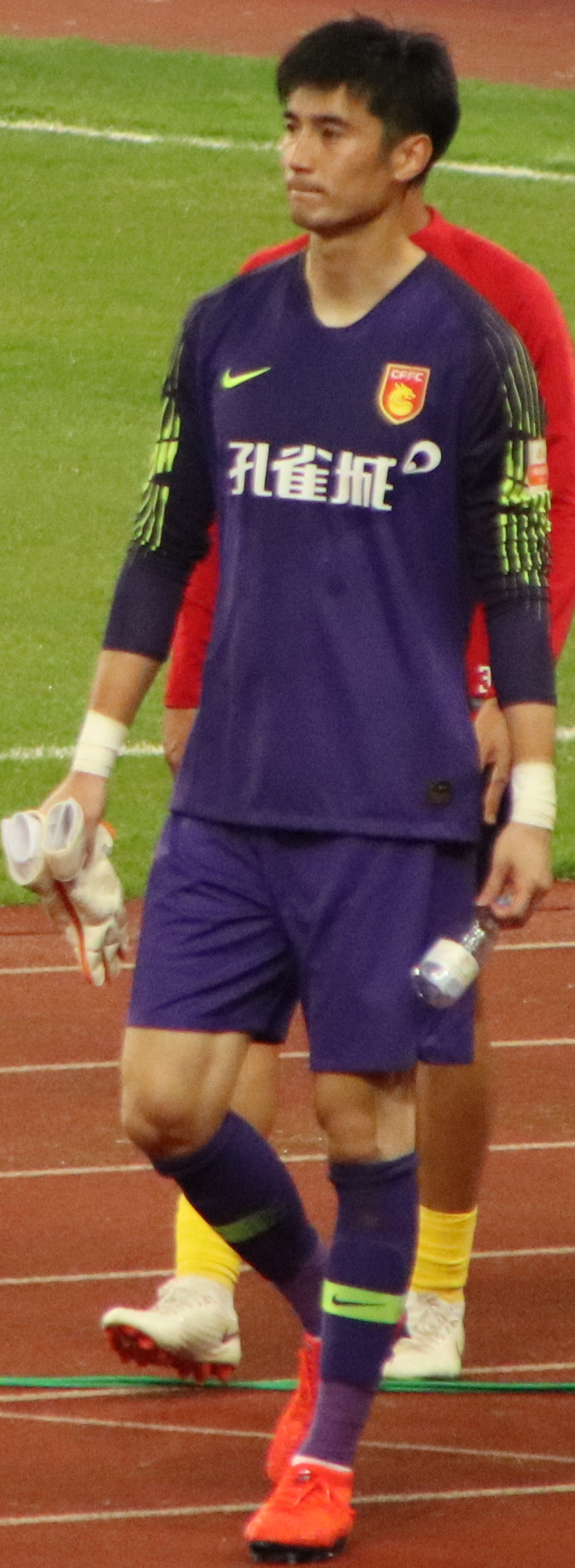

Personal information
- Full name: Geng Xiaofeng
- Date of birth: 15 October 1987 (age 39)
- Place of birth: Shenyang, Liaoning, China
- Height: 1.91 m (6 ft 3 in)
- Position: Goalkeeper

Youth career
- 2001–2006: Shandong Luneng

Senior career*
Years	Team	Apps	(Gls)
2007–2014	Shandong Luneng	41	(0)
2014	→ Shanghai Shenhua (loan)	11	(0)
2015–2016	Shanghai Shenhua	24	(0)
2017–2021	Hebei FC	20	(0)
2020	→ Inner Mongolia Zhongyou (loan)	14	(0)
2021	→ Wuhan Three Towns (loan)	23	(0)
2022–2024	Chengdu Rongcheng	18	(0)
2025	Yunnan Yukun	0	(0)

International career^{‡}
2003–2004	China U-17		
2004–2005	China U-20		
2012–2013	China	3	(0)
Medal record
Representing China
Men's football
EAFF Championship
Silver medal – second place	2013 South Korea	Team
- * Club domestic league appearances and goals as of 8 January 2023 ‡ National team caps and goals as of 13 March 2015

Geng Xiaofeng (simplified Chinese: 耿晓锋; traditional Chinese: 耿曉鋒; pinyin: Gěng Xiǎofēng; born 15 October 1987) is a Chinese retired footballer.

== Club career ==
Geng Xiaofeng joined Shandong Luneng's youth academy at the age of 14 in 2001 and would go on to join their first team when then manager Ljubiša Tumbaković promoted him to act as backup for Li Leilei and then later for Yang Cheng. After several seasons at the club, he did not make an appearance for Shandong until the 2012 league season when on 30 March 2012 in a 1–0 win against Qingdao Jonoon, then manager Henk ten Cate decided to replace Yang, who had made several mistakes in club's first two matches, with Geng whose debut for the club saw him have an outstanding performance. Geng remained as the club's first-choice goalkeeper for the rest of the 2012 season and the 2013 season.

On 24 February 2014, Geng was loaned to fellow Chinese Super League side Shanghai Shenhua until the end of 2014 season. He made his debut for the club on 9 March 2014 in a 2–0 win against Shanghai Shenxin. On 29 December 2014, Geng signed with Shanghai on a permanent transfer. He became the second choice goalkeeper in the 2016 season after Li Shuai joined the club.

In February 2017, Geng moved to fellow Super League side Hebei China Fortune on a five-year contract, but would spend 2017 season in reserve squad of Hebei club due to lack of transfer quota. On 27 October 2018, he made his debut for the club in a 3–2 home win over Dalian Yifang. Geng would struggle to establish himself as the clubs first choice goalkeeper within the team and would be loaned our to second tier clubs Inner Mongolia Zhongyou and then Wuhan Three Towns where he would actually win the division title as well as promotion for the club at the end of the 2021 China League One campaign.

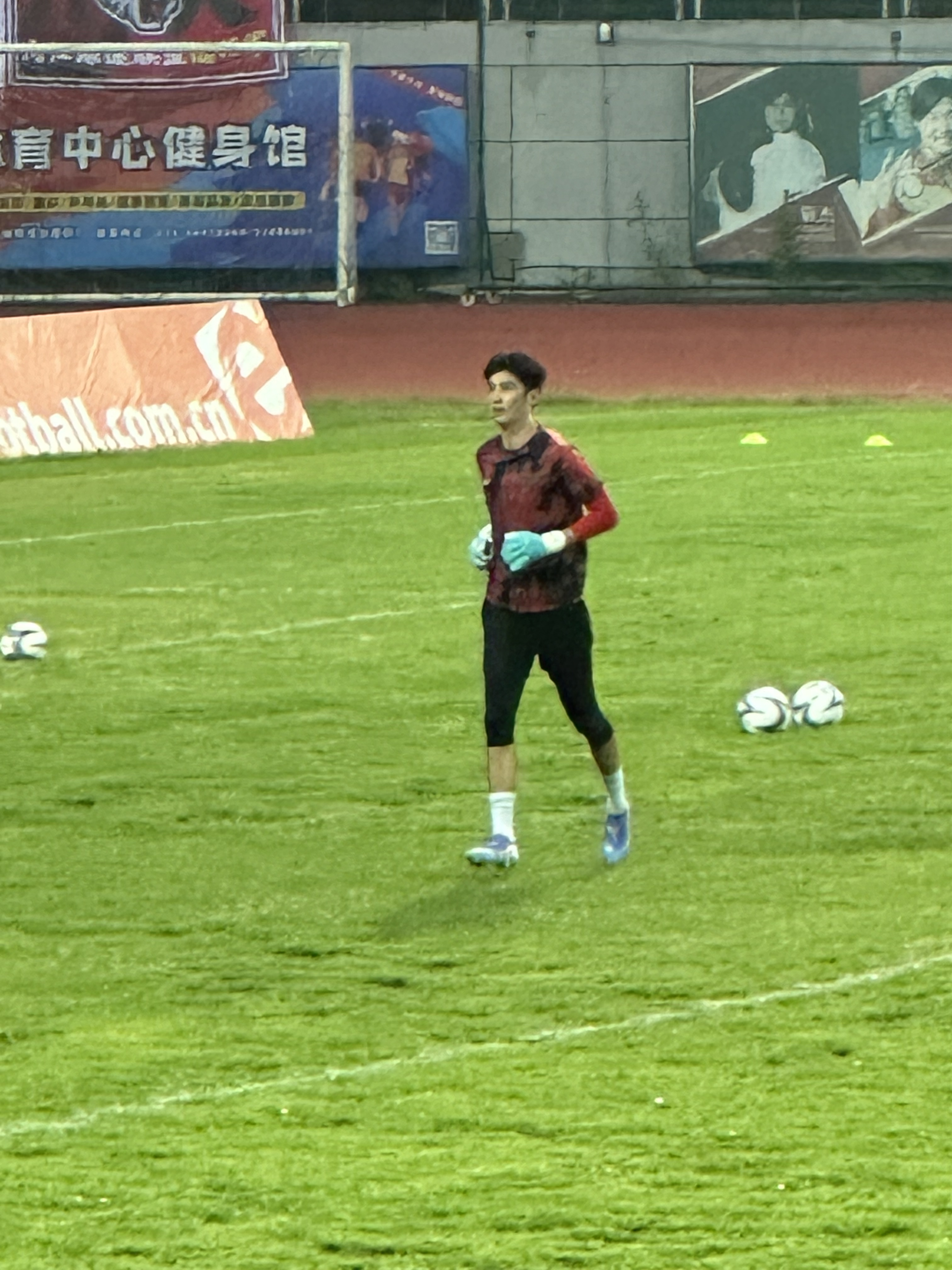
Geng Xiaofeng with Chengdu Rongcheng.

On 24 April 2022, Geng joined newly promoted club Chengdu Rongcheng for the start of the 2022 Chinese Super League season. He would go on to make his debut in a league game on 8 June 2022 against Beijing Guoan, where he came on as a substitute in a 3–2 defeat.

On 4 February 2025, Geng left Chengdu Rongcheng and joined newly promoted club Yunnan Yukun. On 1 January 2026, the club announced Geng's retirement.

== International career ==
In June 2012, Geng received his first call-up to the Chinese national team for friendlies against Spain and Vietnam. On 15 August 2012, he made his debut for China in a 1–1 draw against Ghana, coming on as a substitute for Zeng Cheng in the 74th minute.

== Career statistics ==
Statistics accurate as of match played 8 January 2023.

Appearances and goals by club, season and competition
Club	Season	League			National Cup		Continental		Other		Total	
Club	Season	Division	Apps	Goals	Apps	Goals	Apps	Goals	Apps	Goals	Apps	Goals
Shandong Luneng	2007	Chinese Super League	0	0	-		0	0	-		0	0
Shandong Luneng	2008	Chinese Super League	0	0	-		-		-		0	0
Shandong Luneng	2009	Chinese Super League	0	0	-		0	0	-		0	0
Shandong Luneng	2010	Chinese Super League	0	0	-		0	0	-		0	0
Shandong Luneng	2011	Chinese Super League	0	0	0	0	0	0	-		0	0
Shandong Luneng	2012	Chinese Super League	21	0	1	0	-		-		22	0
Shandong Luneng	2013	Chinese Super League	20	0	1	0	-		-		21	0
Shandong Luneng	Total		41	0	2	0	0	0	0	0	43	0
Shanghai Shenhua (loan)	2014	Chinese Super League	11	0	1	0	-		-		12	0
Shanghai Shenhua	2015	Chinese Super League	21	0	6	0	-		-		27	0
Shanghai Shenhua	2016	Chinese Super League	3	0	2	0	-		-		5	0
Shanghai Shenhua	Total		24	0	8	0	0	0	0	0	32	0
Hebei China Fortune	2018	Chinese Super League	4	0	0	0	-		-		4	0
Hebei China Fortune	2019	Chinese Super League	16	0	1	0	-		-		17	0
Hebei China Fortune	Total		20	0	1	0	0	0	0	0	21	0
Inner Mongolia Zhongyou (loan)	2020	China League One	14	0	0	0	-		-		14	0
Wuhan Three Towns (loan)	2021	China League One	23	0	0	0	-		-		23	0
Chengdu Rongcheng	2022	Chinese Super League	14	0	0	0	-		-		14	0
Career total			147	0	12	0	0	0	0	0	159	0

== Honours ==
=== Club ===
Shandong Luneng

- Chinese Super League: 2006, 2008, 2010
- Chinese FA Cup: 2006

Wuhan Three Towns

- China League One: 2021
