= Huang Bowen (footballer, born 1996) =

Chinese association football player

Personal information
- Date of birth: 15 February 1996 (age 30)
- Place of birth: Lu'an, Anhui, China
- Height: 1.75 m (5 ft 9 in)
- Position: Full-back

Youth career
- –2013: Shanghai Luckystar
- 2013–2014: Shanghai Shenxin
- 2014–2015: Shanghai Shenhua
- 2015: → C.F. Cracks (loan)
- 2015: → Atlético Museros (loan)

Senior career*
Years	Team	Apps	(Gls)
2016	Shanghai Shenhua	0	(0)
2016	→ Wuhan Zall (loan)	21	(0)
2017–2020	Wuhan Zall	37	(0)
2021–2022	Yunnan Yukun Steel		
- * Club domestic league appearances and goals as of 16:41, 31 December 2020 (UTC)

Huang Bowen (Chinese: 黄博文; pinyin: Huáng Bówén; born 15 February 1996) is a Chinese professional footballer who plays as a full-back.

== Club career ==
Huang Bowen played for the Shanghai Shenhua youth team and was sent to Spain to study abroad before returning to China and joining the second tier football club Wuhan Zall on the 27th February 2016 on loan. He then made his debut on 12 March 2016 against Beijing Enterprises Group in a league game that ended in a 1-1 draw. Throughout the season he quickly established himself as a regular within the team and at the start of the following season, Huang signed a four-year contract with the club. This was followed by winning the 2018 China League One division and promotion to the Chinese Super League.

== Career statistics ==
As of 31 December 2020.

Appearances and goals by club, season and competition
Club	Season	League			National Cup		Continental		Other		Total	
Club	Season	Division	Apps	Goals	Apps	Goals	Apps	Goals	Apps	Goals	Apps	Goals
Wuhan Zall (loan)	2016	China League One	21	0	1	0	–		–		22	0
Wuhan Zall	2017	China League One	21	0	1	0	–		–		22	0
Wuhan Zall	2018	China League One	3	0	2	0	–		–		5	0
Wuhan Zall	2019	Chinese Super League	13	0	1	0	–		–		14	0
Wuhan Zall	Total		37	0	4	0	0	0	0	0	41	0
Career total			58	0	5	0	0	0	0	0	63	0

== Honours ==
=== Club ===
Wuhan Zall

- China League One: 2018
