= Zhang Lu (midfielder) =

Chinese footballer (born 1987)

Zhang Lu 张璐
Personal information
- Date of birth: August 23, 1987 (age 39)
- Place of birth: Xinxiang, Henan, China
- Height: 1.80 m (5 ft 11 in)
- Positions: Right winger; right-back

Youth career
- Henan Jianye

Senior career*
Years	Team	Apps	(Gls)
2006–2014	Henan Jianye	194	(15)
2015–2023	Shanghai Shenhua	113	(4)
- * Club domestic league appearances and goals as of 31 January 2023

Zhang Lu (Chinese: 张璐; pinyin: Zhāng Lù; Mandarin pronunciation: [ʈʂáŋ.lû]; born August 23, 1987) is a Chinese former footballer who played as a right winger or right-back for Henan Jianye and Shanghai Shenhua.

At Henan he helped guide the club to their first ever qualification for the Asian Champions League. Within the 2010 AFC Champions League tournament he would play in all their six games and scored the clubs first continental goal against Gamba Osaka on 10 March 2010 in a 1–1 draw. He would move to Shenhua where he would win two Chinese FA Cup's.

== Club career ==
Zhang Lu would start his professional football career with Henan Jianye in the 2006 league season and was part of the squad that won the division title and promotion to the top tier. He would make his first Chinese Super League appearance on 29 April 2007 against Dalian Shide in a 2–1 victory. During the season he would become a squad regular within the team and go on to score his first goal on 15 September 2007 in this time a 3–1 defeat to Dalian Shide. In the following seasons he would establish himself as a vital member within the squad and helped guide the club to their first ever qualification in the Asian Champions League. Within the 2010 AFC Champions League he would play in all six games and scored one goal against Gamba Osaka on 10 March 2010 in a 1–1 draw as Henan were knocked out in the group stages. Unfortunately the club were unable to repeat their achievements in reaching the continental competition and instead soon found themselves relegated at the end of the 2012 league season. Zhang would remain with the club and was part the team that immediately helped win the division title and promotion back into the top tier the following season.

On 30 December 2014, Zhang transferred to Chinese Super League side Shanghai Shenhua. The head coach at Shenhua, Francis Gillot, would convert Zhang from a right winger to a right-back at the beginning of the season and he would play his first game in this position on 8 March 2015 in a league game against Shanghai Shenxin F.C. that ended in a 6–2 victory. The move in position would see Zhang establish himself as a regular within the team and a call-up to the Chinese national team for the first time. He would go on to win his first piece of silverware with the club with the 2017 Chinese FA Cup. This would be followed by another piece of silverware with the 2019 Chinese FA Cup. He would go on to be a squad player until his contract expired and he retired on 1 February 2023.

== Career statistics ==
Statistics accurate as of match played 31 January 2023.

Appearances and goals by club, season and competition
Club	Season	League			National Cup		Continental		Other		Total	
Club	Season	Division	Apps	Goals	Apps	Goals	Apps	Goals	Apps	Goals	Apps	Goals
Henan Jianye	2006	China League One	3	0	0	0	-		-		3	0
Henan Jianye	2007	Chinese Super League	5	1	-		-		-		5	1
Henan Jianye	2008	Chinese Super League	26	3	-		-		-		26	3
Henan Jianye	2009	Chinese Super League	29	0	-		-		-		29	0
Henan Jianye	2010	Chinese Super League	27	2	-		6	1	-		33	3
Henan Jianye	2011	Chinese Super League	27	0	3	1	-		-		30	1
Henan Jianye	2012	Chinese Super League	23	1	0	0	-		-		23	1
Henan Jianye	2013	China League One	28	1	1	0	-		-		29	1
Henan Jianye	2014	Chinese Super League	26	7	3	1	-		-		29	8
Henan Jianye	Total		194	15	7	2	6	1	0	0	207	18
Shanghai Shenhua	2015	Chinese Super League	19	0	6	0	-		-		25	0
Shanghai Shenhua	2016	Chinese Super League	23	0	5	0	-		-		28	0
Shanghai Shenhua	2017	Chinese Super League	11	1	5	0	1	0	-		17	1
Shanghai Shenhua	2018	Chinese Super League	8	1	1	0	6	0	1 (Note: Appearances in Chinese FA Super Cup)	0	16	1
Shanghai Shenhua	2019	Chinese Super League	11	1	2	0	-		-		13	1
Shanghai Shenhua	2020	Chinese Super League	17	0	0	0	4	0	-		21	0
Shanghai Shenhua	2021	Chinese Super League	9	1	5	0	-		-		14	1
Shanghai Shenhua	2022	Chinese Super League	15	0	0	0	-		-		15	0
Shanghai Shenhua	Total		113	4	24	0	11	0	1	0	149	4
Career total			307	19	31	2	13	1	1	0	356	22

== Honours ==
=== Club ===
Henan Jianye

- China League One: 2006, 2013.

Shanghai Shenhua

- Chinese FA Cup: 2017, 2019.
