= Jiang Kun (footballer) =

Chinese footballer

Jiang Kun 姜坤
Personal information
- Date of birth: 2 August 1979 (age 47)
- Place of birth: Wuhan, Hubei, China
- Height: 1.81 m (5 ft 11 in)
- Position: Midfielder

Senior career*
Years	Team	Apps	(Gls)
1997–2003	Bayi Football Team	111	(10)
2004	Sichuan First City	10	(1)
2005	Shanghai The 9	23	(6)
2006	Shanghai United	27	(4)
2007–2015	Shanghai Shenhua	173	(12)
2009	→ Henan Construction (loan)	27	(1)
2016	Qingdao Huanghai	9	(1)
2017	Wuhan Chufeng Heli		
2018–2019	Wuhan Three Towns	12	(2)

International career
2006–2007	China PR	4	(0)

Managerial career
- 2023: Haikou Mingcheng
- 2024: Wuhan Three Towns U21
- 2025–2026: Wuhan Three Towns B
- * Club domestic league appearances and goals

Jiang Kun (Chinese: 姜坤; pinyin: Jiāng Kūn; born 2 August 1979) is a Chinese football coach and former professional footballer who played as a midfielder. He was capped four times by China.

== Club career ==
=== Bayi Football Team ===
Jiang was born in Wuhan, Hubei. He started his professional football career in 1997 with Bayi Football Team (who were named 1 August Zhenbang at the time) after graduating from their youth team. He would gradually establish himself as a regular within the team and help them receive promotion to the top tier in the 2000 league season. At the end of the 2003 league season Bayi Football Team disbanded and Jiang Kun was free to transfer to any other club.

=== Sichuan First City ===
Jiang Kun would decide to join another top-tier club Sichuan First City at the beginning of 2004 Chinese Super League season. He would have a solid start to his Sichuan career when he was immediately named as a first choice regular and would even score his first goal by the third league game against Shanghai Shenhua on 26 May 2004 in 1–1 draw. Results were not kind to Sichuan and he found himself increasingly dropped from the team and by the end of the season he would only play in ten league games.

=== Shanghai ===
In the 2005 league season he moved to the newly promoted second-tier club Shanghai The 9 and would make his competitive debut in a league game on 4 March 2005 against Nanjing Yoyo in a 1–1 draw. This was followed by his first goal for the club against Yanbian FC in a league game on 19 March 2005 that Shanghai The 9 won 2–0. By the end of the season Jiang had established himself as a vital member of the team by playing in 23 games and scoring 6 goals. Off the field the club's owner Zhu Jun acquired top-tier club Shanghai United and hoped to merge both the two teams, however this wasn't possible due to the transfer rules in Chinese football. Instead Jiang along with four other players joined Shanghai United while Shanghai The 9 was sold off to a new owner.

In the 2007 season Shanghai United F.C. was dissolved to allow them to join neighbouring Super League team Shanghai Shenhua, allowing both teams to merge. All the players from Shanghai United would move to Shanghai Shenhua and despite the inflamed squad Jiang Kun was one of the few consistent first choice players within the team. This continued the following season, however despite the significantly reduced squad by the beginning of the 2009 league season he was loaned out to Henan Construction. He played 27 league games and scored 1 goal in Season 2009.

=== Qingdao Huanghai ===
On 5 February 2016, Jiang transferred to China League One club Qingdao Huanghai.

== International career ==
Jiang was called up to the Chinese senior national team where he made his debut on 7 June 2006 in a friendly against France in a 3–1 defeat coming on as a late substitute for Zhao Junzhe. In preparation for the 2007 AFC Asian Cup he would make several further friendly appearances, however the Chinese Head coach Zhu Guanghu decided that his performances were not good enough to be included in the squad to go to the tournament.
