= 2004 Chinese FA Cup =

2004 The Chinese Football Association Cup
CFA Cup

Tournament details
- Country: China
- Teams: 29

Final positions
- Champions: Shandong Luneng Taishan (3rd title)
- Runners-up: Sichuan First City
- Champions League: Shandong Luneng Taishan

Tournament statistics
- Matches played: 42
- Goals scored: 126 (3 per match)
- Top goal scorer(s): (Sweden) Daniel Nannskog (9 goals)

The Pabst Blue Ribbon 2004 Chinese FA Cup (Chinese: 2004蓝带中国足球协会杯) was the 10th edition of Chinese FA Cup. The matches of first round were kicked off on 10 April 2004, and the final took place at Helong Stadium on 18 December 2004.

The cup title sponsor was China Pabst Blue Ribbon.

== Results ==
=== First round ===
10 April	Inter Shanghai	2 – 1	Dalian Changbo	Shanghai Stadium, Shanghai
15:00	Wang Yun 14'; Qi Hong 57'		Zhu Ting 72'	Attendance: 8,000

10 April	Xi'an Anxinyuan	0 – 1	Shenzhen Jianlibao	Xianyang Stadium, Xianyang
15:00			Yang Chen 50'	Attendance: 7,000

10 April	Henan Construction	2 – 1	Changchun Yatai	Xinxiang Stadium, Xinxiang
15:00	Babeu 32'; Jin Haibo 54'		Wang Wanpeng 26'	Attendance: 20,000

10 April	Zhejiang Babei Greentown	0 – 1	Shandong Luneng Taishan	Huanglong Stadium, Hangzhou
15:30			Meng Yao 12'	Attendance: 10,000

10 April	Jiangsu Sainty	0 – 1	Wuhan Huanghelou	Yangzhou Stadium, Yangzhou
15:30			Miu Jia 18'	Attendance: 8,000

10 April	Chongqing Lifan	1 – 2	Shenzhen Kejian	Fuling Stadium, Chongqing
15:30	Wang Kai 38'		Zhang Guoping 60', 70'	Attendance: 16,000

10 April	Qingdao Sbright	1 – 1 (a.e.t.) (5 - 3 p)	Chengdu Wuniu	Linyi Stadium, Linyi
15:30	Paszulewicz 38' (o.g.)		You Long 64'	Attendance: 14,000
	Penalties
	Lü Gang (penalty scored); Zhou Ting (penalty scored); Jiang Ning (penalty scored); Jiang Feng (penalty scored); Shi Hanjun (penalty scored)		(penalty scored) (penalty scored) (penalty scored); (penalty missed) Hu Lei

11 April	Shaanxi National Power	2 – 0	Guangzhou Sunray Cave	Baoji Stadium, Baoji
15:00	Renato Martins 46'; Chen Jun 83'			Attendance: 2,000

11 April	Qingdao Hailifeng	1 – 0	Liaoning F.C.	Yantai Sports Park Stadium, Yantai
15:00	Shao Yanjie 61'			Attendance: 13,000

11 April	Zhuhai Zobon	2 – 0	Hunan Shoking	Yuanshen Stadium, Shanghai
15:30	Yang Lin 16'; Liu Quande 30' (pen.)			Attendance: 4,000

11 April	Nanjing Huamen Yoyo	0 – 0 (a.e.t.) (5 - 6 p)	Tianjin Master Kong	Wutaishan Stadium, Nanjing
15:30				Attendance: 2,500
	Penalties
	(penalty scored) (penalty scored) (penalty scored) (penalty scored) (penalty scored); Nagy (penalty missed)		(penalty scored) Sun Jianjun; (penalty scored) Han Yanming; (penalty scored) Lu Yan; (penalty scored) Wang Jun; (penalty scored) Tian Ye; (penalty scored) Mara

11 April	Dongguan Dongcheng	0 – 0 (a.e.t.) (4 - 5 p)	Shanghai Shenhua SVA	Dongguan Stadium, Dongguan
15:30				Attendance: 3,000
	Penalties
	Li Haiqiang (penalty missed); Gao Fei (penalty scored); Ferreri (penalty scored); Antonio (penalty scored); Chi Lei (penalty missed); Rao Wei (penalty missed); Li Zheng (penalty scored); Shi Meng (penalty missed)		(penalty missed) Albertz; (penalty scored) Xiao Zhanbo; (penalty missed) Li Dawei; (penalty scored) Zhang Yuning; (penalty scored) Sun Wei; (penalty missed) Zheng Wei; (penalty scored) Yang Guang; (penalty scored) Yao Lijun

11 April	Sichuan First City	4 – 1	Xiamen Jixiang Shishi	Chengdu Stadium, Chengdu
15:30	Nannskog 35', 66'; Wang Song 46'; Sun Fenghao 53'		Agbo 68'	Attendance: 3,000

=== Second round ===
==== First leg ====
29 April	Henan Construction	1 – 1	Dalian Shide	Luohe Stadium, Luohe
15:00	Zhang Miao 45+2'		Zou Jie 10'	Attendance: 5,000

1 May	Qingdao Sbright	3 – 0	Inter Shanghai	Linyi Stadium, Linyi
15:30	Lü Gang 3'; Jiang Ning 23'; Sun Xinbo 71'			Attendance: 12,000

1 May	Zhuhai Zobon	1 – 4	Shenzhen Jianlibao	Yuanshen Stadium, Shanghai
15:30	Xu Xin 77'		Yang Chen 45'; Zheng Zhi 47', 53', 60'	Attendance: 2,000

2 May	Shaanxi National Power	1 – 2	Shenyang Ginde	Baoji Stadium, Baoji
15:00	Renato Martins 61'		Yu Guijun 45+1'; Ayorinde 73'	Attendance: 4,000

2 May	Qingdao Hailifeng	1 – 1	Sichuan First City	Tiantai Stadium, Qingdao
15:00	Edvaldo 16'		Nannskog 72'	Attendance: 5,000

2 May	Wuhan Huanghelou	2 – 1	Beijing Hyundai	Jingzhou Stadium, Jingzhou
15:30	Jorjão 54'; Will 76'		Kenesei 37'	Attendance: 5,000

2 May	Shenzhen Kejian	1 – 5	Shandong Luneng Taishan	Tai'an Sports Center Stadium, Tai'an ^{1}
15:30	Yu Feng 43'		Song Lihui 9', 21'; Ouédec 35', 83'; Li Xiaopeng 45+1'	Attendance: 15,000

2 May	Tianjin Master Kong	1 – 1	Shanghai Shenhua SVA	Minyuan Stadium, Tianjin
15:30	Wang Jun 87'		Albertz 13'	Attendance: 12,000

- ^1 Shenzhen Kejian abdicated to play at their home stadium.

==== Second leg ====
5 May	Shandong Luneng Taishan	4 – 1 (9 - 2 agg.)	Shenzhen Kejian	Tai'an Sports Center Stadium, Tai'an
15:30	Li Xiaopeng 31'; Han Peng 35'; Anić 62'; Li Jinyu 83'		Rodrigues 32'	Attendance: 18,000

5 May	Beijing Hyundai	0 – 2 (1 - 4 agg.)	Wuhan Huanghelou	Xiannongtan Stadium, Beijing
19:00			Jorjão 54'; Vicente 61'	Attendance: 8,000

6 May	Inter Shanghai	3 – 0 (a.e.t.) (3 - 3 agg.) (1 – 3 p)	Qingdao Sbright	Shanghai Stadium, Shanghai
15:30	Cheng Liang 15'; Du Ping 27'; Ayew 59'			Attendance: 5,000
	Penalties
	Ayew (penalty missed); Du Ping (penalty scored); Huang Zhenhua (penalty missed); Zhang Weihua (penalty missed); Wu Chengying^{2} (penalty missed)		(penalty scored) Lü Gang; (penalty scored) Zhou Ting; (penalty scored) Holovko; (penalty missed) ^{2}

6 May	Shenzhen Jianlibao	4 – 1 (8 - 2 agg.)	Zhuhai Zobon	Shenzhen Stadium, Shenzhen
15:30	Li Yi 5', 65'; Yang Chen 7', 48'		Pouga 60'	Attendance: 4,000

6 May	Shenyang Ginde	1 – 0 (3 - 1 agg.)	Shaanxi National Power	Wulihe Stadium, Shenyang
19:00	Yu Guijun 60'			Attendance: 10,000

6 May	Sichuan First City	3 – 0 (4 - 1 agg.)	Qingdao Hailifeng	Chengdu Sports Centre, Chengdu
19:30	Zou Yougen 50' (pen.); Nannskog 73', 90'			Attendance: 3,000

9 May	Shanghai Shenhua SVA	3 – 1 (4 - 2 agg.)	Tianjin Master Kong	Yuanshen Stadium, Shanghai
19:30	Wang Xiao 5' (o.g.); Li Chengming 20'; Li Dawei 58'		Yu Genwei 50'

11 May	Dalian Shide	4 – 0 (5 - 1 agg.)	Henan Construction	Dalian People's Stadium, Dalian
19:00	Šiljak 23', 62', 73'; Xie Yongliang 53' (o.g.)

- ^2 The Penalty shoot-out was supposed to end at the fourth round, however, Lu Jun, referee of the match, insisted both teams to kick one addition round.

=== Third round ===
==== First leg ====
7 July	Qingdao Sbright	1 – 1	Shenzhen Jianlibao	Linyi Stadium, Linyi
15:30	Lü Gang 48'		Zhang Xinxin 57'	Attendance: 13,000

7 July	Wuhan Huanghelou	0 – 4	Shandong Luneng Taishan	Jingzhou Stadium, Jingzhou
16:00			Gao Yao 7'; Han Peng 14', 76'; Ouédec 21'	Attendance: 10,000

7 July	Sichuan First City	2 – 1	Dalian Shide	Longquanyi Football Stadium, Chengdu
19:30	Nannskog 61'; Pantelić 85'		Zhang Peng 39'	Attendance: 5,000

7 July	Shanghai Shenhua SVA	6 – 1	Shenyang Ginde	Yuanshen Stadium, Shanghai
19:40	Zhang Yuning 30', 45+1', 66'; Dong Yang 34', 50'; Vera 80'		Yu Guijun 64'	Attendance: 6,000

==== Second leg ====
11 July	Shenyang Ginde	1 – 2 (2 - 8 agg.)	Shanghai Shenhua SVA	Jinzhou City Stadium, Jinzhou
16:00	Yu Guijun 50'		Zhang Yuning 65', 85'	Attendance: 20,000

11 July	Shandong Luneng Taishan	0 – 1 (4 - 1 agg.)	Wuhan Huanghelou	Tai'an Sports Center Stadium, Tai'an
19:30			Li Hao 3'	Attendance: 10,000

11 July	Dalian Shide	1 – 3 (2 - 5 agg.)	Sichuan First City	Dalian People's Stadium, Dalian
19:30	Zhang Peng 4'		Nannskog 19'; Wang Song 57', 65'	Attendance: 3,000

11 July	Shenzhen Jianlibao	4 – 2 (5 - 3 agg.)	Qingdao Sbright	Shenzhen Stadium, Shenzhen
19:40	Oyawolé 49', 55' (pen.), 68'; Huang Fengtao 80'		Gao Ming 27', 77'	Attendance: 20,000

=== Semi-finals ===
==== First leg ====
8 August	Shandong Luneng Taishan	1 – 1	Shenzhen Jianlibao	Tai'an Sports Center Stadium, Tai'an
19:30	Gao Yao 73'		Li Yi 90+1'	Attendance: 10,000

8 August	Sichuan First City	2 – 1	Shanghai Shenhua SVA	Dalian People's Stadium, Dalian
19:30	Nannskog 4'; Zou Yougen 19'		Qu Shengqing 78'	Attendance: 2,000

==== Second leg ====
14 August	Shenzhen Jianlibao	3 – 3 (4 - 4 agg.)	Shandong Luneng Taishan (a)	Shenzhen Stadium, Shenzhen
19:30	Li Yi 2', 54'; Zheng Zhi 11' (pen.)		Li Jinyu 32', 41'; Zhou Haibin 47'

14 August	Shanghai Shenhua SVA	2 – 3 (3 - 5 agg.)	Sichuan First City	Yuanshen Stadium, Shanghai
19:40	Yu Tao 27'; Wang Ke 90'		Nannskog 4'; Zou Yougen 8', 78'

=== Final ===
18 December
19:00

Shandong Luneng Taishan	2 – 1	Sichuan First City
Li Jinyu 24'; Shu Chang 84'	Report	Yan Feng 17'

Helong Stadium, Changsha
Attendance: 20,000
Referee: Lee Gi-young (South Korea)

Shandong	Sichuan

Shandong:
GK	35	(China) Yang Cheng
RB	25	(China) Jiao Zhe	(yellow card) 80'
CB	6	(Serbia and Montenegro) Vladimir Matijašević
CB	5	(China) Shu Chang (c)
LB	3	(China) Wang Chao
DM	2	(China) Liu Jindong	(yellow card) 61'
DM	16	(China) Gao Yao
DM	18	(China) Zhou Haibin
AM	9	(China) Han Peng		(substituted off) 72'
FW	29	(China) Li Jinyu
FW	10	(France) Nicolas Ouédec
Substitutes used:
MF	7	(China) Song Lihui		(substituted on) 72'
Coach:
(Serbia and Montenegro) Ljubiša Tumbaković

Sichuan:
GK	1	(China) Sun Shoubo
CB	3	(China) Wang Suolong
CB	4	(China) Liu Yu
CB	5	(China) Tang Jing
DM	7	(China) Zhao Xuri	(yellow card) 45+1'
DM	18	(China) Yan Feng
RM	11	(China) Yang Pengfeng
LM	16	(China) Wang Song
AM	10	(Serbia and Montenegro) Miodrag Pantelić
FW	12	(Sweden) Daniel Nannskog
FW	20	(China) Zou Yougen (c)
Substitutes used:
Coach:
(China) Gao Huichen

== See also ==
- 2004 Chinese Super League Cup
