= Beijing Guoan F.C.–Shandong Taishan F.C. rivalry =

Football rivalry in China

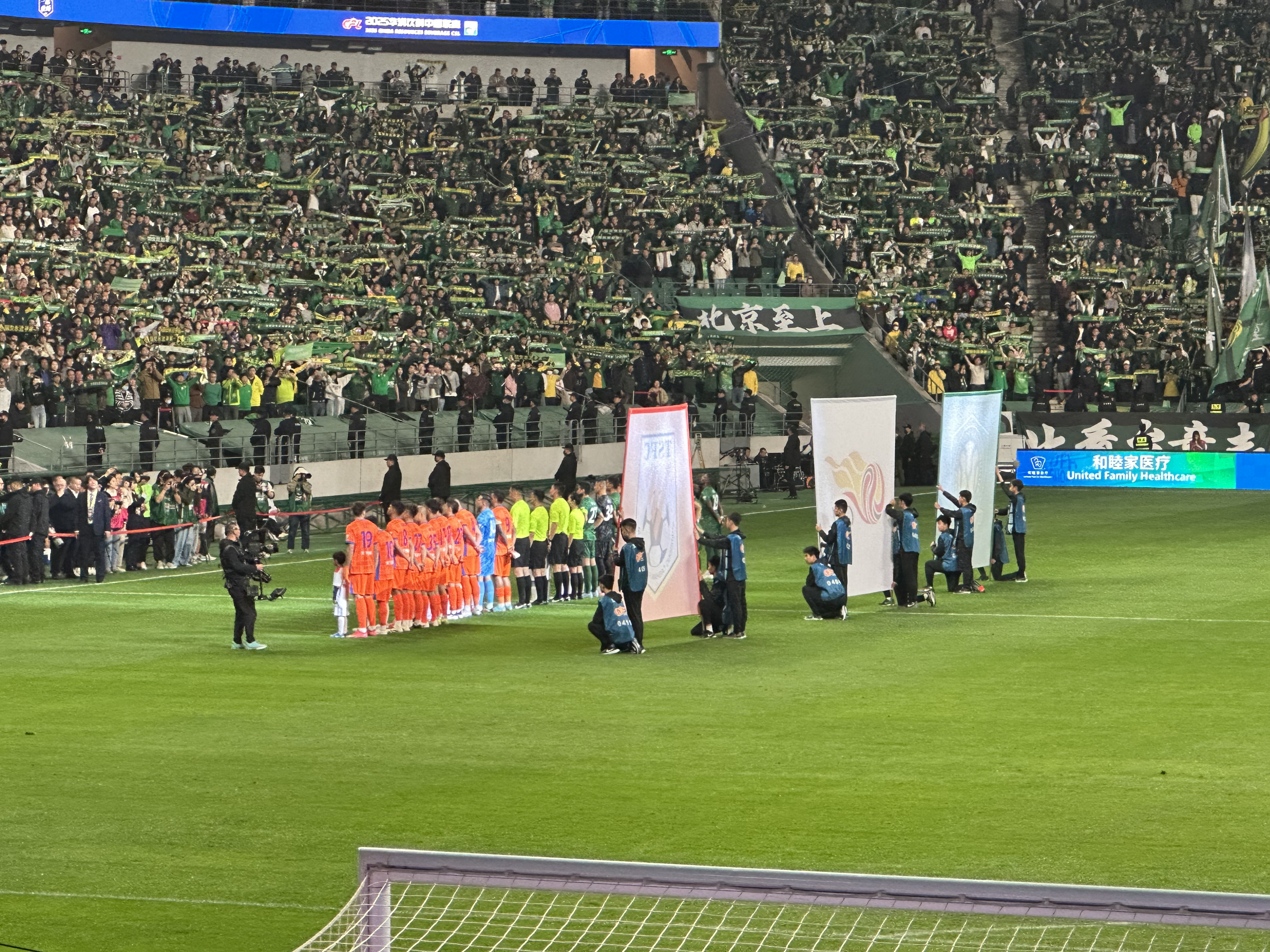
- Beijing Guoan and Shandong Taishan players in 2025
- Other names: Jing–Lu rivalry
- Location: China
- Teams: Beijing Guoan; Shandong Taishan
- First meeting: 10 July 1994; 1–1 draw
- Latest meeting: Beijing Guoan 2–0 Shandong Taishan; 2026 Chinese Super League (4 July 2026)
- Stadiums: Workers' Stadium (Beijing Guoan); Jinan Olympic Sports Center Stadium (Shandong Taishan)

Statistics
- Total meetings: 82
- Most wins: Shandong Taishan (31) (Note: Forfeited matches excluded)
- Top scorer: Branko Jelić (9 goals)
- All-time series: Shandong Taishan: 31; Drawn: 30; Beijing Guoan: 21
- Largest victory: 6–0 win for Shandong Taishan (31 August 2025)

The Beijing Guoan F.C.–Shandong Taishan F.C. rivalry, also known as the Jing–Lu rivalry, is a football rivalry between Beijing-based club Beijing Guoan and Jinan-based club Shandong Taishan. It takes place twice a year in the Chinese Super League, and occasionally in the Chinese FA Cup. Both clubs were founding members of the former Jia-A League when they turned professional before the 1994 season, as well as the current Chinese Super League, and have participated in every edition of China's top-tier professional football league.

As of July 2026, Shandong Taishan leads in head-to-head results in official competitive matches with 31 wins to Beijing Guoan's 21, with 30 draws.

== History ==
The rivalry between Guoan and Shandong developed during the early years of China's professional football era. The clubs first met in the inaugural Jia-A League season in 1994, and the fixture began to gain prominence in 1995 when they met four times across league and Chinese FA Cup competition, including a two-legged FA Cup semi-final won by Shandong in the 1995 Chinese FA Cup. In the 1996, Guoan's only home defeat came at the hands of Shandong, and Shandong won both league encounters. However, Guoan managed to best Shandong 4–1 in the Chinese FA Cup final later in the year.

In 1999, Shandong secured its league victory on the final day after Guoan drew at home to Liaoning Fushun. In 2000, former Guoan player Casiano Delvalle signed for Shandong and scored in both league fixtures against Guoan. Xu Yang, Guoan's sole goalscorer in the rivalry that year, went on to sign for Shandong in the following season. In 2002, Delvalle returned to Guoan and scored in Guoan's home win against Shandong. However, Guoan lost to Shandong in the return fixture in November, which resulted in Guoan conceding the top of the league.

In 2006, the two teams faced off six times across different competitions, with Shandong securing a commanding three wins, two draws and one loss. In August, Shandong's Han Peng scored in the third minute at home against Guoan, helping Shandong secure its league title six matchweeks in advance. In 2007, Guoan recorded a 6–1 victory against Shandong in Jinan and won both league fixtures.

During the 2010s, the clubs continued to meet in high-profile league fixtures and domestic cup tie, with Shandong sometimes being described as Beijing's bogey team, citing Shandong's consistent performances against Beijing. However, in the 2018 Chinese FA Cup, Guoan defeated Shandong in the final over two legs on the away goals rule.

In recent years, the rivalry has continued to produce notable results. In April 2025, Beijing defeated Shandong 6–1 at the Workers' Stadium, equalling the largest margin of victory in the history of the fixture, before Shandong responded in the reverse fixture in August with a 6–0 home victory, the largest winning margin between the clubs as of 2026. Guoan players clashed with dissatisfied fans after the match, generating significant controversy.

The terms "turtle" (Chinese: 龟) and "donkey" (Chinese: 驴) have evolved into derogatory representations for the two teams. The term "donkey" was coined from a near-homophone of the first character of Shandong's previous name Luneng to the word for donkey in Chinese, while the term "turtle" draws its inspiration from a turtle's likeness to Guoan's badge.

== Competitive matches ==
=== League matches ===
This table includes matches from the Chinese Jia-A League and the Chinese Super League.

#	Season	Date	Division	Home team	Away team	Score	Home goalscorer(s)	Away goalscorer(s)	Notes
1	1994	10 July 1994	Chinese Jia-A League	Shandong Jinan Taishan	Beijing Guoan	1–1	Xing Rui (24 p.)	Xie Feng (19 p.)	
2	1994	6 November 1994	Chinese Jia-A League	Beijing Guoan	Shandong Jinan Taishan	2–2	Xie Feng (20), Gao Feng (53)	Xing Rui (13), Li Ming (24)	
3	1995	16 April 1995	Chinese Jia-A League	Shandong Jinan Taishan	Beijing Guoan	2–1	Su Maozhen (13), Tang Xiaocheng (23)	Yang Chen (27)	
4	1995	10 September 1995	Chinese Jia-A League	Beijing Guoan	Shandong Jinan Taishan	1–1	Gao Hongbo (84 p.)	Tang Xiaocheng (49)	(Note: Last meeting played at Xiannongtan Stadium)
5	1996	12 May 1996	Chinese Jia-A League	Jinan Taishan Jiangjun	Beijing Guoan	3–1	Tang Xiaocheng (1, 61), Su Maozhen (72)	Gao Hongbo (87)	
6	1996	15 September 1996	Chinese Jia-A League	Beijing Guoan	Jinan Taishan Jiangjun	0–1		Su Maozhen (37)	(Note: First meeting played at the old Workers' Stadium)
7	1997	27 March 1997	Chinese Jia-A League	Beijing Guoan	Jinan Taishan Jiangjun	2–1	Hu Jianping (7), Xie Feng (75)	Li Xiaopeng (76)	
8	1997	16 November 1997	Chinese Jia-A League	Jinan Taishan Jiangjun	Beijing Guoan	0–0			
9	1998	23 April 1998	Chinese Jia-A League	Beijing Guoan	Shandong Luneng Taishan	3–1	Nan Fang (18), Li Hongzheng (46), Wang Shaolei (77)	Xing Rui (68)	
10	1998	9 August 1998	Chinese Jia-A League	Shandong Luneng Taishan	Beijing Guoan	3–3	Osmanović (51), Li Xiaopeng (53, 63)	Song Lihui (15 o.g.), Hu Jianping (43, 69)	
11	1999	9 May 1999	Chinese Jia-A League	Beijing Guoan	Shandong Luneng Taishan	1–0	Li Yi (43)		
12	1999	9 September 1999	Chinese Jia-A League	Shandong Luneng Taishan	Beijing Guoan	2–0	Su Maozhen (35), Paulista (54)		
13	2000	14 May 2000	Chinese Jia-A League	Beijing Guoan	Shandong Luneng Taishan	0–1		Delvalle (65)	
14	2000	10 September 2000	Chinese Jia-A League	Shandong Luneng Taishan	Beijing Guoan	1–1	Delvalle (70)	Xu Yang (14)	
15	2001	29 March 2001	Chinese Jia-A League	Beijing Guoan	Shandong Luneng Taishan	0–0			
16	2001	15 July 2001	Chinese Jia-A League	Shandong Luneng Taishan	Beijing Guoan	2–0	Lamptey (8, 82)		
17	2002	21 July 2002	Chinese Jia-A League	Beijing Guoan	Shandong Luneng Taishan	2–0	Delvalle (44), Yang Pu (82)		
18	2002	3 November 2002	Chinese Jia-A League	Shandong Luneng Taishan	Beijing Guoan	2–1	Moreno (45), Nahornyak (79)	Pažin (20)	
19	2003	6 July 2003	Chinese Jia-A League	Shandong Luneng Taishan	Beijing Hyundai	0–0			
20	2003	29 October 2003	Chinese Jia-A League	Beijing Hyundai	Shandong Luneng Taishan	3–2	Kenesei (22, 56), Yang Pu (51)	Nahornyak (78), Kiriakov (80)	
21	2004	15 September 2004	Chinese Super League	Beijing Hyundai	Shandong Luneng Taishan	1–1	Gao Leilei (30)	Jiao Zhe (90)	
22	2004	28 November 2004	Chinese Super League	Shandong Luneng Taishan	Beijing Hyundai	5–2	Wang Chao (21), Han Peng (37), Li Jinyu (62), Zhou Haibin (83, 90+2)	Gao Leilei (50), Sui Dongliang (70)	
23	2005	2 July 2005	Chinese Super League	Beijing Hyundai	Shandong Luneng Taishan	4–0	Jelić (5, 78), Tao Wei (27), Wang Chao (35 o.g.)		
24	2005	22 October 2005	Chinese Super League	Shandong Luneng Taishan	Beijing Hyundai	4–2	Zhou Haibin (15), Han Peng (40), Dănciulescu (56, 78)	Sui Dongliang (19), Xu Yunlong (90)	
25	2006	22 April 2006	Chinese Super League	Beijing Guoan	Shandong Luneng Taishan	0–0			(Note: Played at Beijing Fengtai Stadium)
26	2006	27 August 2006	Chinese Super League	Shandong Luneng Taishan	Beijing Guoan	1–0	Han Peng (3)		
27	2007	8 August 2007	Chinese Super League	Shandong Luneng Taishan	Beijing Guoan	1–6	Zhou Haibin (26)	Shu Chang (21 o.g.), Tao Wei (41), Tiago (45+2 p., 90+4), Yan Xiangchuang (83, 90+1)	
28	2007	14 November 2007	Chinese Super League	Beijing Guoan	Shandong Luneng Taishan	1–0	Tiago (30 p.)		
29	2008	5 April 2008	Chinese Super League	Beijing Guoan	Shandong Luneng Taishan	1–1	Martínez (81)	Zhou Haibin (45)	
30	2008	20 September 2008	Chinese Super League	Shandong Luneng Taishan	Beijing Guoan	2–0	Li Jinyu (5), Wang Yongpo (45)		
31	2009	17 April 2009	Chinese Super League	Shandong Luneng Taishan	Beijing Guoan	2–2	Han Peng (3, 73)	Cichero (64 o.g.), Griffiths (85)	
32	2009	30 August 2009	Chinese Super League	Beijing Guoan	Shandong Luneng Taishan	1–1	Zhou Ting (80 p.)	Cui Peng (30)	
33	2010	26 August 2010	Chinese Super League	Shandong Luneng Taishan	Beijing Guoan	1–0	Li Jinyu (12)		
34	2010	11 September 2010	Chinese Super League	Beijing Guoan	Shandong Luneng Taishan	2–3	Xu Liang (30 p.), Diakité (78 o.g.)	Han Peng (18), de León (45), Lü Zheng (88)	
35	2011	18 June 2011	Chinese Super League	Beijing Guoan	Shandong Luneng Taishan	1–1	Griffiths (49)	Obina (90)	
36	2011	28 September 2011	Chinese Super League	Shandong Luneng Taishan	Beijing Guoan	1–1	Wang Yongpo (21)	Zhou Ting (41)	
37	2012	13 April 2012	Chinese Super League	Beijing Guoan	Shandong Luneng Taishan	2–1	Reinaldo (16), Xu Liang (70)	Macena (9)	
38	2012	11 August 2012	Chinese Super League	Shandong Luneng Taishan	Beijing Guoan	4–0	Wang Yongpo (8, 39 p.), Lü Zheng (80, 87)		(Note: Last meeting played at the Shandong Provincial Stadium)
39	2013	26 June 2013	Chinese Super League	Beijing Guoan	Shandong Luneng Taishan	3–0	Zhang Xizhe (37), Guerrón (56), Kanouté (73)		
40	2013	30 October 2013	Chinese Super League	Shandong Luneng Taishan	Beijing Guoan	1–3	Vágner Love (70)	Utaka (16, 45), Wang Hao (84)	(Note: First meeting played at the Jinan Olympic Sports Center Stadium)
41	2014	19 April 2014	Chinese Super League	Beijing Guoan	Shandong Luneng Taishan	0–3		Vágner Love (9, 69, 84)	
42	2014	23 August 2014	Chinese Super League	Shandong Luneng Taishan	Beijing Guoan	2–2	Vágner Love (4), Aloísio (45+2)	Matić (28), Fejzullahu (52)	
43	2015	26 April 2015	Chinese Super League	Shandong Luneng Taishan	Beijing Guoan	3–0	Aloísio (6, 90+5), Zheng Zheng (20)		
44	2015	12 August 2015	Chinese Super League	Beijing Guoan	Shandong Luneng Taishan	3–1	Damjanović (7), Piao Cheng (47), Yu Dabao (85)	Aloísio (54)	
45	2016	29 May 2016	Chinese Super League	Shandong Luneng Taishan	Beijing Guoan	0–2		Yu Dabao (13), Zhang Chiming (59)	
46	2016	25 September 2016	Chinese Super League	Beijing Guoan	Shandong Luneng Taishan	1–2	Yu Dabao (43)	Pellè (12), Montillo (76 p.)	
47	2017	15 April 2017	Chinese Super League	Shandong Luneng Taishan	Beijing Sinobo Guoan	1–0	Wu Xinghan (38)		
48	2017	5 August 2017	Chinese Super League	Beijing Sinobo Guoan	Shandong Luneng Taishan	2–2	Ba Dun (25), Li Lei (31)	Pellè (14), Cissé (45+3)	
49	2018	4 March 2018	Chinese Super League	Shandong Luneng Taishan	Beijing Sinobo Guoan	3–0	Tardelli (29, 31), Wu Xinghan (85)		
50	2018	5 August 2018	Chinese Super League	Beijing Sinobo Guoan	Shandong Luneng Taishan	1–1	Augusto (40)	Tardelli (5)	
51	2019	30 June 2019	Chinese Super League	Shandong Luneng Taishan	Beijing Sinobo Guoan	2–0	Guedes (28, 30)		
52	2019	1 December 2019	Chinese Super League	Beijing Sinobo Guoan	Shandong Luneng Taishan	3–2	Zhang Yuning (43), Augusto (45+3 p.), Wang Ziming (90+1)	Guedes (15 p.), Fellaini (34)	(Note: Last meeting played at the old Workers' Stadium)
53	2020	17 October 2020	Chinese Super League	Shandong Luneng Taishan	Beijing Sinobo Guoan	2–2	Pellè (25 p.), Jin Jingdao (37)	Bakambu (48 p., 69)	(Note: Played at the Kunshan Sports Centre Stadium)
54	2020	22 October 2020	Chinese Super League	Beijing Sinobo Guoan	Shandong Luneng Taishan	2–1	Zhang Yuning (19, 75)	Moisés (15)	(Note: Played at the Suzhou Sports Center)
55	2021	16 December 2021	Chinese Super League	Shandong Taishan	Beijing Guoan	2–1	Son Jun-ho (80), Jadson (90+2)	Zhang Yuning (73)	(Note: Played at the Guangzhou Higher Education Mega Center Stadium)
56	2021	29 December 2021	Chinese Super League	Beijing Guoan	Shandong Taishan	1–1	Anderson (17)	Dai Lin (29)	
57	2022	9 October 2022	Chinese Super League	Beijing Guoan	Shandong Taishan	3–3	Gao Tianyi (28, 74), Yu Dabao (53)	Cryzan (39), Moisés (89, 90+5 p.)	(Note: Played at the International Football Center of Rizhao)
–	2022	31 December 2022	Chinese Super League	Shandong Taishan	Beijing Guoan	3–0 (f.)			(Note: Beijing Guoan forfeited the match due to an insufficient amount of fieldable players amidst COVID-19 infections among the team)
58	2023	29 April 2023	Chinese Super League	Beijing Guoan	Shandong Taishan	0–0			(Note: First meeting played at the new Workers' Stadium)
59	2023	30 July 2023	Chinese Super League	Shandong Taishan	Beijing Guoan	3–0	Fellaini (59), Li Yuanyi (73), Fernandinho (90)		
60	2024	9 March 2024	Chinese Super League	Shandong Taishan	Beijing Guoan	0–0			
61	2024	30 June 2024	Chinese Super League	Beijing Guoan	Shandong Taishan	2–0	Adegbenro (4), Abreu (5)		
62	2025	19 April 2025	Chinese Super League	Beijing Guoan	Shandong Taishan	6–1	Abreu (15, 52), Guga (45+4), Serginho (47), Zhang Yuning (76), Zhang Xizhe (90+1)	Zeca (4)	
63	2025	31 August 2025	Chinese Super League	Shandong Taishan	Beijing Guoan	6–0	Qazaishvili (15, 22, 43, 71), Madruga (45, 62)		
64	2026	14 March 2026	Chinese Super League	Shandong Taishan	Beijing Guoan	2–1	Xie Wenneng (49), Cryzan (88)	Zhang Yuning (86)	
65	2026	4 July 2026	Chinese Super League	Beijing Guoan	Shandong Taishan	2–0	Serginho (74), Lin Liangming (81)		

=== Cup matches ===
This table includes matches from the Chinese FA Cup.

#	Season	Date	Stage of competition	Home team	Away team	Score	Home goalscorer(s)	Away goalscorer(s)	Notes
1	1995	23 July 1995	Semi-finals	Beijing Guoan	Shandong Jinan Taishan	2–1	Nan Fang (67), Han Xu (71)	Tang Xiaocheng (26)	
2	1995	30 July 1995	Semi-finals	Shandong Jinan Taishan	Beijing Guoan	2–1 (5–4 p.)	Li Bo (40), Tang Xiaocheng (49)	Nan Fang (19)	
3	1996	3 November 1996	Final	Beijing Guoan	Jinan Taishan Jiangjun	4–1	Gao Hongbo (20), Gao Feng (44, 70), Deng Lejun (68)	Tang Xiaocheng (50)	
4	1999	5 June 1999	Third round (Note: Effectively the quarter-finals)	Beijing Guoan	Shandong Jinan Taishan	0–0			
5	1999	11 July 1999	Third round	Shandong Jinan Taishan	Beijing Guoan	1–0	Li Ming (26)		
6	2005	2 October 2005	Semi-finals	Beijing Hyundai	Shandong Luneng Taishan	1–3	Jelić (83 p.)	Cui Peng (35), Lü Zheng (54), Dănciulescu (90+1)	
7	2005	5 October 2005	Semi-finals	Shandong Jinan Taishan	Beijing Hyundai	4–3	Zheng Zhi (31 p.), Dănciulescu (45), Li Xiaopeng (62), Lü Zheng (65)	Jelić (48, 69 p.), Xu Yunlong (51)	
8	2011	19 October 2011	Semi-final	Shandong Luneng Taishan	Beijing Guoan	0–0 (4–3 p.)			
9	2014	6 August 2014	Fifth round	Beijing Guoan	Shandong Luneng Taishan	1–1 (3–5 p.)	Fejzullahu (34)	Aloísio (74)	
10	2018	25 November 2018	Final	Beijing Sinobo Guoan	Shandong Luneng Taishan	1–1	Bakambu (51 p.)	Tardelli (31 p.)	
11	2018	30 November 2018	Final	Shandong Luneng Taishan	Beijing Sinobo Guoan	2–2	Gil (31), Tardelli (89)	Viera (16), Zhang Xizhe (81)	(Note: Beijing Sinobo Guoan won the final on the away goals rule)
12	2019	24 July 2019	Sixth round	Shandong Luneng Taishan	Beijing Sinobo Guoan	2–1 (a.e.t.)	Guedes (45+2), Pellè (97)	Bakambu (64)	
13	2023	31 August 2023	Fifth round	Beijing Guoan	Shandong Taishan	1–1 (Note: After extra time) (4–5 p.)	Kang Sang-woo (19)	Chen Pu (10)	

=== Other competitive matches ===
#	Season	Date	Competition	Stage of competition	Home team	Away team	Score	Home goalscorer(s)	Away goalscorer(s)	Notes
1	2004	2 June 2004	Chinese Super League Cup	First round	Shandong Luneng Taishan	Beijing Hyundai	5–0	Liu Jindong (8), Ouédec (10, 13 p.), Song Lihui (39), Han Peng (80)		
2	2004	6 June 2004	Chinese Super League Cup	First round	Beijing Hyundai	Shandong Luneng Taishan	2–1	Jelić (55, 62)	Liu Jindong (48)	
3	2005	5 June 2005	Chinese Super League Cup	Second round	Beijing Hyundai	Shandong Luneng Taishan	2–2	Sui Dongliang (80), Jelić (81)	Li Jinyu (70), Han Peng (76)	
4	2005	12 June 2005	Chinese Super League Cup	Second round	Shandong Luneng Taishan	Beijing Hyundai	3–2	Zheng Zhi (45, 61, 70)	Jelić (8), Xu Yunlong (59)	

== Statistics ==
As of 4 July 2026

	Matches	Wins		Draws	Goals	
	Matches	Beijing	Shandong	Draws	Beijing	Shandong
Chinese Super League	45	13	17	15	66	73
Chinese Jia-A League	20	5	7	8	22	25
Chinese FA Cup	13	2	5	6	17	19
Chinese Super League Cup	4	1	2	1	6	11
All matches	82	21	31	30	111	128

=== Head-to-head ranking in the domestic league (1994–present) ===
Beijing Guoan's positions are marked with a green background, while Shandong Taishan's positions are marked with an orange background.

P.	94	95	96	97	98	99	00	01	02	03	04	05	06	07	08	09	10	11	12	13	14	15	16	17	18	19	20	21	22	23	24	25	26
1						1							1		1	1	1											1					
2		2									2			2				2		2	2					2			2	2			
3				3	3				3			3	3	3	3				3	3		3			3		3						3
4			4						4							4					4	4			4						4	4	4
5	5		5				5										5	5					5			5	5	5			5	5	
6		6		6		6	6	6				6												6						6			
7											7																		7				
8	8							8																									
9					9					9														9									
10																			10														
11																																	
12										12																							
13																																	
14																							14										
15																																	
16																																	
17																																	
18																																	

- Total: Beijing Guoan with 17 higher finishes, Shandong Taishan with 16 higher finishes (as of the end of the 2026 season).
- The biggest difference in positions for Beijing Guoan from Shandong Taishan is 9 places in the 2016 season; the biggest difference in positions for Shandong Taishan from Beijing Guoan is 5 places in the 1999 season, the 2004 season, and the 2022 season.

== Records ==
=== Top goalscorers ===
As of 4 July 2026
Bold indicates players currently playing for either club, players in italics are still active outside either club.

Rank	Player	Club	CSL	Jia-A League	CFA Cup	CSL Cup	Total
1	(Serbia) Branko Jelić	Beijing Guoan	2	—	3	4	9
2	(China) Han Peng	Shandong Taishan	6	—	—	2	8
3	(China) Tang Xiaocheng	Shandong Taishan	—	4	3	—	7
4	(China) **Zhang Yuning**	Beijing Guoan	6	—	—	—	6
5	(China) Zhou Haibin	Shandong Taishan	5	—	—	—	5
5	(China) Lü Zheng	Shandong Taishan	3	—	2	—	5
5	(Brazil) Vágner Love	Shandong Taishan	5	—	—	—	5
5	(China) Aloísio	Shandong Taishan	4	—	1	—	5
5	(Brazil) Diego Tardelli	Shandong Taishan	3	—	2	—	5
10	(China) Su Maozhen	Shandong Taishan	—	4	—	—	4
10	(China) Zheng Zhi	Shandong Taishan	—	—	1	3	4
10	(China) Li Xiaopeng	Shandong Taishan	—	3	1	—	4
10	(Romania) Ionel Dănciulescu	Shandong Taishan	2	—	2	—	4
10	(China) Li Jinyu	Shandong Taishan	3	—	—	1	4
10	(China) Wang Yongpo	Shandong Taishan	4	—	—	—	4
10	(Brazil) Róger Guedes	Shandong Taishan	3	—	1	—	4
10	(Italy) Graziano Pellè	Shandong Taishan	3	—	1	—	4
10	(Democratic Republic of the Congo) Cédric Bakambu	Beijing Guoan	2	—	2	—	4
10	(China) Yu Dabao	Beijing Guoan	4	—	—	—	4
10	(Georgia (country)) **Valeri Qazaishvili**	Shandong Taishan	4	—	—	—	4

=== Players at both clubs ===
A total of eighteen players have played for both clubs:

- (Spain) Casiano Delvalle
- (China) Deng Lejun
- (China) Fang Hao
- (China) Gao Tianyi (Note: Player played for Shandong Taishan in his youth career.)
- (China) Hao Wei
- (China) Jia Feifan
- (China) Jiao Zhe
- (China) Li Ming
- (China) Liu Guobo (Note: Player never made a senior appearance for Shandong Taishan.)
- (Bulgaria) Predrag Pažin
- (China) Tang Shi
- (China) Tian Yuda
- (China) Wang Gang
- (China) Wang Xiaolong
- (China) Wei Shihao
- (China) Wu Hao
- (China) Xiao Junlong (Note: Player played for both clubs at youth level.)
- (China) Xu Yang
