= 2004 Chinese Super League Cup =

CSL Cup

Tournament details
- Country: China
- Teams: 12

Final positions
- Champions: Shandong Luneng Taishan (1st title)
- Runners-up: Shenzhen Jianlibao

Tournament statistics
- Matches played: 21
- Goals scored: 74 (3.52 per match)
- Top goal scorer(s): (Romania) Bogdan Mara (4 goals)

The 2004 Chinese Super League Cup (Chinese: 2004中国足球协会超级联赛杯) was the first edition of Chinese Super League Cup. Shandong Luneng Taishan won the title after beating Shenzhen Jianlibao 2–0 in the final.

== Results ==
=== First round ===
==== First leg ====
2 June	Tianjin Master Kong	4–0	Shenyang Ginde	TEDA Football Stadium, Tianjin
15:30	Zhang Shuo 57'; Han Yanming 68' (pen.); Mara 72'; Wei Zhonghu 90'			Attendance: 4,000

2 June	Shandong Luneng Taishan	5–0	Beijing Hyundai	Tai'an Sports Center Stadium, Tai'an
19:30	Liu Jindong 8'; Ouédec 10', 13' (pen.); Song Lihui 39'; Han Peng 80'			Attendance: 13,000

2 June	Qingdao Sbright	2–1	Liaoning Zhongyu	Yizhong Sports Center, Qingdao
19:30	Sui Yong 12'; Jiang Ning 48'		Zhang Yonghai 77' (pen.)	Attendance: 2,000; Referee: Zhou Weixin

2 June	Sichuan First City	4–0	Chongqing Lifan	Chengdu Sports Centre, Chengdu
19:30	Yang Pengfeng 21'; Wang Song 43'; Zou Yougen 46'; Jiang Chen 78'			Attendance: 2,000

==== Second leg ====
6 June	Shenyang Ginde	0–7 (0–11 agg.)	Tianjin Master Kong	Minyuan Stadium, Tianjin ^{1}
15:30			Mara 13', 33'; Liu Wei 29'; Díaz 55'; Wang Jiaduo 65' (o.g.); Cao Yang 68'; Han Yanming 90'	Attendance: 6,000; Referee: Huang Junjie

6 June	Beijing Hyundai	2–1 (2–6 agg.)	Shandong Luneng Taishan	Workers Stadium, Beijing
19:30	Jelić 55', 62'		Liu Jindong 48'	Attendance: 8,000; Referee: Chen Honghui

6 June	Liaoning Zhongyu	2–0 (3–2 agg.)	Qingdao Sbright	Yingkou Stadium, Yingkou
19:30	Lebe 4'; Zhu Kai 49'			Attendance: 20,000; Referee: Lu Jun

6 June	Chongqing Lifan	3–1 (3–5 agg.)	Sichuan First City	Datianwan Stadium, Chongqing
19:40	Liu Xin 54'; Shi Jun 77'; Huo Zhiyu 90'		Pantelić 52' (pen.)	Attendance: 16,000; Referee: Sun Baojie

- ^1 Shenyang Ginde abdicated to play at their home stadium.

=== Second round ===
==== First leg ====
1 July	Shandong Luneng Taishan	0–0	Dalian Shide	Tai'an Sports Center Stadium, Tai'an
19:30				Attendance: 8,000

1 July	Liaoning Zhongyu	0–0	Shanghai Shenhua SVA	Yingkou Stadium, Yingkou
19:30				Attendance: 23,000

1 July	Shenzhen Jianlibao	2–0	Sichuan First City	Shenzhen Stadium, Shenzhen
19:30	Oyawolé 27' (pen.); Kovács 64'			Attendance: 2,000

1 July	Tianjin Master Kong	5–2	Inter Shanghai	TEDA Football Stadium, Tianjin
19:40	Wei Zhonghu 15'; Cao Yang 18'; Chen Liming 19'; Tian Ye 36'; Han Yanming 81'		Du Ping 31'; Zé Alcino 80' (pen.)	Attendance: 5,000

==== Second leg ====
4 July	Sichuan First City	3–2 (3–4 agg.)	Shenzhen Jianlibao	Nanchong Stadium, Nanchong
16:30	Nannskog 9'; Tan Wangsong 44'; Jiang Kun 81'		Zhang Xinxin 23'; Oyawolé 63'	Attendance: 6,000

4 July	Dalian Shide	1–1 (1–1(a) agg.)	Shandong Luneng Taishan	Dalian People's Stadium, Dalian
19:30	Hu Zhaojun 61'		Song Lihui 44'	Attendance: 10,000

4 July	Shanghai Shenhua SVA	4–1 (4–1 agg.)	Liaoning Zhongyu	Yuanshen Stadium, Shanghai
19:40	Yu Tao 8'; Albertz 48'; Jia Wenpeng 52'; Zhang Yuning 58'		Zhang Yonghai 71' (pen.)	Attendance: 4,000

4 July	Inter Shanghai	1–0 (3–5 agg.)	Tianjin Master Kong	Shanghai Stadium, Shanghai
19:40	Zé Alcino 14' (pen.)			Attendance: 3,000

=== Semi-finals ===
==== First leg ====
18 August	Shandong Luneng Taishan	1–0	Shanghai Shenhua SVA	Shandong Provincial Stadium, Jinan
19:30	Li Xiaopeng 82'			Attendance: 10,000

18 August	Tianjin Master Kong	3–3	Shenzhen Jianlibao	TEDA Football Stadium, Tianjin
19:40	Yu Genwei 5'; Mara 34'; Lu Yan 86'		Li Yi 11'; Wen Guanghui 29'; Zheng Zhi 37' (pen.)	Attendance: 10,000

==== Second leg ====
22 August	Shenzhen Jianlibao	4–2 (7–5 agg.)	Tianjin Master Kong	Shenzhen Stadium, Shenzhen
19:30	Kovács 15', 79'; Li Yi 22'; Oyawolé 23'		Cao Yang 18' (pen.); Lu Yan 71'	Attendance: 28,000

22 August	Shanghai Shenhua SVA	3–2 (3–3(a) agg.)	Shandong Luneng Taishan	Yuanshen Stadium, Shanghai
19:40	Martínez 20', 74'; Shen Longyuan 86'		Li Jinyu 19', 90'	Attendance: 2,000

=== Final ===
11 December
15:00

Shandong Luneng Taishan	2 - 0	Shenzhen Jianlibao
Shu Chang 33'; Wang Chao 50'

Shandong Provincial Stadium, Jinan
Attendance: 30,000
Referee: Hiroyoshi Takayama (Japan)

Shandong:
GK	35	(China) Yang Cheng
RB	25	(China) Jiao Zhe
CB	5	(China) Shu Chang (c)	(yellow card) 45'
CB	6	(Serbia and Montenegro) Vladimir Matijašević
LB	3	(China) Wang Chao
CM	2	(China) Liu Jindong
CM	16	(China) Gao Yao
CM	18	(China) Zhou Haibin
RW	29	(China) Li Jinyu
LW	10	(France) Nicolas Ouédec		(substituted off) 89'
ST	31	(China) Han Peng		(substituted off) 75'
Substitutes used:
MF	7	(China) Song Lihui		(substituted on) 75'
DF	14	(China) Yuan Weiwei		(substituted on) 89'
Coach:
(Serbia and Montenegro) Ljubiša Tumbaković

Shenzhen:
GK	19	(China) Li Leilei
CB	5	(China) Li Weifeng (c)
CB	28	(China) Xin Feng	(red card) 31'
CB	34	(Poland) Marek Zając
RWB	14	(China) Li Jianhua		(substituted off) 33'
LWB	20	(China) Zhang Xinxin
DM	2	(China) Chen Yongqiang	(yellow card) 36'
DM	23	(China) Wang Hongwei	(yellow card) 24'	(substituted off) 46'
AM	29	(China) Lu Bofei		(substituted off) 65'
SS	7	(Togo) Djima Oyawolé	(yellow card) 17'
ST	9	(China) Li Yi
Substitutes used:
DF	21	(China) Li Ming		(substituted on) 33'
MF	10	(China) Zheng Zhi	(yellow card) 90'	(substituted on) 46'
MF	15	(China) Wen Guanghui		(substituted on) 65'
Coach:
(China) Zhu Guanghu

== See also ==
- 2004 Chinese FA Cup
