= Yang Cheng (football goalkeeper) =

Chinese footballer

Yang Cheng 杨程
Personal information
- Date of birth: October 11, 1985 (age 41)
- Place of birth: Tianjin, China
- Height: 1.88 m (6 ft 2 in)
- Position: Goalkeeper

Youth career
- 1998–2000: Tianjin Locomotive
- 2000–2003: Shandong Luneng

Senior career*
Years	Team	Apps	(Gls)
2004–2014	Shandong Luneng	112	(0)
2015–2020	Hebei China Fortune	115	(0)

International career
2004–2005	China U20	?	(?)
- * Club domestic league appearances and goals as of 31 December 2020

Yang Cheng (simplified Chinese: 杨程; traditional Chinese: 楊程; pinyin: Yáng Chéng; born 11 October 1985) is a former Chinese football goalkeeper.

== Club career ==
Born in Tianjin, Yang originally started his career with the Tianjin Locomotive youth team. He would then move to the Shandong Luneng youth team in 2000 where he graduated through the various youth squads. He would eventually graduate to the senior team and for several seasons was used as an understudy and would later make his league debut on November 4, 2004 against Shenyang Ginde in a 4-1 win. After that game he retained his place within the team and despite his age Yang would start in the 2004 Chinese FA Cup final, which the club won 2-1 against Sichuan Guancheng. The following season Yang established himself as the first choice goalkeeper throughout the season and while Shandong finished the season in third Li Leilei was brought into the squad at the beginning of the 2006 league season to add more experience towards the team.

On 27 February 2015, he transferred to China League One side Hebei China Fortune. In his debut season with the club Yang would immediately establish himself as the club's first choice goalkeeper and went on to win promotion to the Chinese Super League in his first season with the club.

== International career ==
Under head coach Eckhard Krautzun Yang Cheng would be the first choice goalkeeper for the U-20 Chinese football team in the 2005 FIFA World Youth Championship held in the Netherlands. While he would aid China to the knock out stages of the competition Yang Cheng would find himself at fault for China's defeat to Germany when he conceded a penalty that saw Germany win 3-2.

== Career statistics ==
Statistics accurate as of match played 31 December 2020.

Appearances and goals by club, season and competition
Club	Season	League			National Cup		League Cup		Continental		Total	
Club	Season	Division	Apps	Goals	Apps	Goals	Apps	Goals	Apps	Goals	Apps	Goals
Shandong Luneng	2004	Chinese Super League	4	0	1	0	1	0	-		6	0
Shandong Luneng	2005	Chinese Super League	24	0	5	0		0	8	0	37	0
Shandong Luneng	2006	Chinese Super League	1	0	0	0	-		-		1	0
Shandong Luneng	2007	Chinese Super League	1	0	-		-		1	0	2	0
Shandong Luneng	2008	Chinese Super League	0	0	-		-		-		0	0
Shandong Luneng	2009	Chinese Super League	3	0	-		-		0	0	3	0
Shandong Luneng	2010	Chinese Super League	29	0	-		-		3	0	32	0
Shandong Luneng	2011	Chinese Super League	30	0	3	0	-		6	0	39	0
Shandong Luneng	2012	Chinese Super League	9	0	2	0	-		-		11	0
Shandong Luneng	2013	Chinese Super League	10	0	2	0	-		-		12	0
Shandong Luneng	2014	Chinese Super League	1	0	1	0	-		0	0	2	0
Shandong Luneng	Total		112	0	14	0	1	0	18	0	145	0
Hebei China Fortune	2015	China League One	28	0	0	0	-		-		28	0
Hebei China Fortune	2016	Chinese Super League	30	0	0	0	-		-		30	0
Hebei China Fortune	2017	Chinese Super League	30	0	1	0	-		-		31	0
Hebei China Fortune	2018	Chinese Super League	26	0	0	0	-		-		26	0
Hebei China Fortune	2019	Chinese Super League	1	0	0	0	-		-		1	0
Hebei China Fortune	2020	Chinese Super League	0	0	0	0	-		-		0	0
Hebei China Fortune	Total		115	0	1	0	0	0	0	0	116	0
Career total			227	0	15	0	1	0	18	0	261	0

== Honours ==
=== Club ===
Shandong Luneng

- Chinese Super League: 2006, 2008, 2010
- Chinese FA Cup: 2004, 2006, 2014
- Chinese Super League Cup: 2004
