= Yu Guijun =

Chinese footballer

Yu Guijun 于贵君
Personal information
- Date of birth: 15 April 1985 (age 41)
- Place of birth: Dandong, Liaoning, China
- Height: 1.73 m (5 ft 8 in)
- Position: Forward

Youth career
- 2002–2003: Shenyang Ginde

Senior career*
Years	Team	Apps	(Gls)
2004–2013	Guangzhou R&F	159	(8)
2013	→ Qingdao Hainiu (loan)	11	(2)
2014	Qingdao Hainiu	25	(2)
2015–2018	Shenzhen Renren	34	(0)
- * Club domestic league appearances and goals as of 13 October 2018

Yu Guijun (Chinese: 于贵君; pinyin: Yú Guìjūn; born 15 April 1985) is a Chinese former football player.

== Club career ==
Yu was initially an amateur footballer and studied in Dandong No.2 Middle School. He was scouted by Shenyang Ginde youth team coach in 2002 when he had a wonderful performance in the Liaoning Provincial Sports Games. He began to receive professional football training from July 2002 and was promoted to first team squad in 2004. On 2 May 2004, Yu made his senior debut in the first leg of the second round in the 2004 Chinese FA Cup and scored his first senior goal in the first half as Shenyang Ginde beat Shaanxi Guoli 2–1. He continued to score in the second leg on 6 May, helping Shenyang Ginde to advance to the third round. Having a promising performance in the FA Cup, Yu became a regular starter and made his league debut on 16 May, in a 0–0 home draw against Shenzhen Jianlibao. He scored his first league goal in the third league appearance on 26 May, which Shenyang Ginde were beaten by Beijing Hyundai 4–1. Yu scored 3 goals in 19 appearances in the Super League and 4 goals in the FA Cup in his debut season.

Yu made stable appearances in the next few seasons and followed the club to move to Changsha in 2007. Changsha Ginde finished the bottom in the 2010 league season and relegation to China League One. In February 2011, the club moved to Shenzhen as the club's name changed into Shenzhen Phoenix, Yu chose to stay in the club. The club were bought by Chinese property developers Guangzhou R&F and moved to Guangzhou in June and won promotion back to the Super League at the first attempt. Yu made 17 appearances and scored 2 goals in the 2011 league season. On 21 July 2013, Yu was loaned to China League Two side Qingdao Hainiu until 31 December.

In 2015, Yu signed for Shenzhen Renren.

== Career statistics ==
Statistics accurate as of match played 13 October 2018.

Club performance			League		Cup		League Cup		Continental		Total	
Season	Club	League	Apps	Goals	Apps	Goals	Apps	Goals	Apps	Goals	Apps	Goals
China PR			League		FA Cup		CSL Cup		Asia		Total	
2004	Guangzhou R&F	Chinese Super League	19	3	4	4	2	0	-		25	7
2005	Guangzhou R&F	Chinese Super League	26	0	0	0	2	0	-		28	0
2006	Guangzhou R&F	Chinese Super League	25	1	2	0	-		-		27	1
2007	Guangzhou R&F	Chinese Super League	7	0	-		-		-		7	0
2008	Guangzhou R&F	Chinese Super League	23	1	-		-		-		23	1
2009	Guangzhou R&F	Chinese Super League	23	1	-		-		-		23	1
2010	Guangzhou R&F	Chinese Super League	8	0	-		-		-		8	0
2011	Guangzhou R&F	China League One	17	2	2	0	-		-		19	2
2012	Guangzhou R&F	Chinese Super League	10	0	0	0	-		-		10	0
2013	Guangzhou R&F	Chinese Super League	1	0	0	0	-		-		1	0
2013	Qingdao Hainiu	China League Two	11	2	-		-		-		11	2
2014	Qingdao Hainiu	China League One	25	2	3	0	-		-		28	2
2016	Shenzhen Renren	China League Two	18	0	1	0	-		-		19	0
2017	Shenzhen Renren	China League Two	9	0	0	0	-		-		9	0
2018	Shenzhen Renren	China League Two	7	0	0	0	-		-		7	0
Total	China PR		226	12	12	4	4	0	0	0	242	16
