= Han Peng (footballer, born 1983) =

Chinese footballer

Han Peng 韩鹏
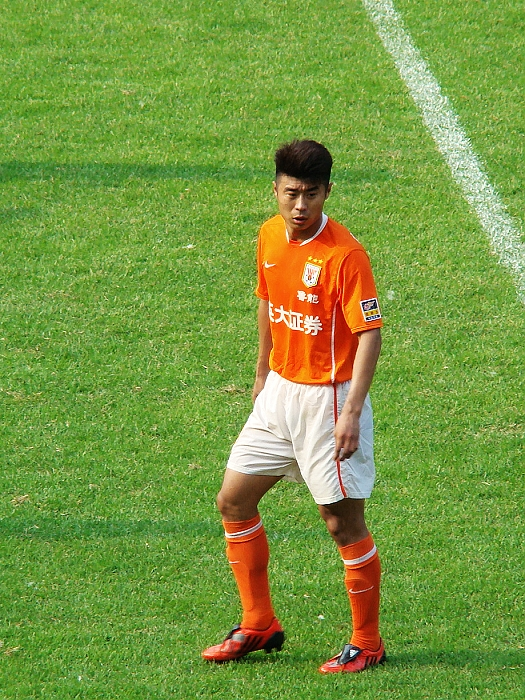

Personal information
- Full name: Han Peng
- Date of birth: 13 September 1983 (age 43)
- Place of birth: Jinan, Shandong, China
- Height: 1.85 m (6 ft 1 in)
- Position: Striker

Youth career
- Shandong Luneng

Senior career*
Years	Team	Apps	(Gls)
2002–2015	Shandong Luneng	268	(93)
2016–2018	Beijing Renhe	35	(4)

International career^{‡}
2008	China Olympic (O.P.)	2	(0)
2006–2014	China	35	(10)

Managerial career
- 2022–2023: Shandong Taishan U17
- 2024–2025: Shandong Taishan B
- 2025–2026: Shandong Taishan
- * Club domestic league appearances and goals as of 11 November 2018 ‡ National team caps and goals as of 22 October 2016

Han Peng (simplified Chinese: 韩鹏; traditional Chinese: 韓鵬; pinyin: Hán Péng; born 13 September 1983) is a Chinese football coach and former footballer.

== Club career ==
A product of Shandong Luneng's youth academy, Han Peng made his debut for the club on 10 March 2002 against Sichuan Guancheng. This was followed by his first league goal on 23 March 2002 in a game against Chongqing Lifan. Gradually establishing himself within the Shandong team for several seasons, it wasn't until Han was partnered with Li Jinyu during the 2005 season that he started to show his prolific nature as a striker when he scored seven league goals. This was followed by another ten league goals that helped Shandong win the 2006 league title as well as the Chinese FA Cup. While the next season would see Han have his most productive season when he scored thirteen league goals, he was unable to help Shandong retain the league title. The 2008 season was to personally be a disappointing campaign for Han when he found himself injured throughout most of the season; however, he was still able to help Shandong win the league title.

On 19 December 2015, Han moved to China League One side Beijing Renhe with a two-year contract on a free transfer. He extended his contract with the club on 31 December 2017 after Beijing Renhe promoted to the Chinese Super League.

== International career ==
Han made his international debut on 3 June 2006 in a 4–1 loss against Switzerland. Despite this result, he would quickly become an integral part of Zhu Guanghu's squad that achieved qualification for the 2007 AFC Asian Cup and even scored his first goal against Iraq on 15 November 2006 in a 1–1 draw. During the tournament, Han found himself playing as a lone striker with fellow partner Li Jinyu completely dropped from the squad. While he was able to score two goals within the tournament, he could not help China having a disastrous campaign and getting kicked out of the group stages. Vladimir Petrović was brought in as the new manager for the 2010 FIFA World Cup qualification and he still considered Han as China's best striker. While he played in several games throughout the campaign, he was unable to score in any games as China was unable to qualify for the 2010 FIFA World Cup.

== Coaching career ==
On 28 July 2026, Shandong Taishan annouanced Han's departure as first team coach.

== Career statistics ==
=== Club ===
Statistics accurate as of match played 11 November 2018.

Club	Season	Division	League		Cup		Continental		Total	
Club	Season	Division	Apps	Goals	Apps	Goals	Apps	Goals	Apps	Goals
Shandong Luneng	2002	1	18	2	1	1	-		19	3
Shandong Luneng	2003	1	8	3	2	0	-		10	3
Shandong Luneng	2004	1	10	3	9	4	-		19	7
Shandong Luneng	2005	1	25	6	9	4	7	2	41	12
Shandong Luneng	2006	1	26	10	5	5	-		31	15
Shandong Luneng	2007	1	22	13	-		6	2	28	15
Shandong Luneng	2008	1	10	8	-		-		10	8
Shandong Luneng	2009	1	28	11	-		5	3	33	14
Shandong Luneng	2010	1	28	17	-		6	2	34	19
Shandong Luneng	2011	1	26	8	2	1	5	1	33	10
Shandong Luneng	2012	1	14	3	0	0	-		14	3
Shandong Luneng	2013	1	15	7	0	0	-		15	7
Shandong Luneng	2014	1	21	0	5	1	4	1	30	2
Shandong Luneng	2015	1	17	2	4	1	4	0	25	3
Beijing Renhe	2016	2	17	4	2	1	-		19	5
Beijing Renhe	2017	2	17	0	1	0	-		18	0
Beijing Renhe	2018	1	1	0	1	0	-		2	0
Totals			303	97	41	18	37	11	381	126

=== International goals ===
#	Date	Venue	Opponent	Score	Competition
1	15 November 2006	Changsha, China	Iraq	1–1	2007 AFC Asian Cup qualifier
2	7 February 2007	Suzhou, China	Kazakhstan	2–1	Friendly international
3	27 March 2007	Macau, China	Uzbekistan	3–1	Friendly international
4	27 March 2007	Macau, China	Uzbekistan	3–1	Friendly international
5	10 July 2007	Kuala Lumpur, Malaysia	Malaysia	5–1	2007 AFC Asian Cup
6	10 July 2007	Kuala Lumpur, Malaysia	Malaysia	5–1	2007 AFC Asian Cup
7	15 March 2008	Kunming, China	Thailand	3–3	Friendly international
8	25 July 2009	Tianjin, China	Kyrgyzstan	3–0	Friendly international
9	8 November 2009	Kuwait City, Kuwait	Kuwait	2–2	Friendly international
10	30 December 2009	Yiwu, China	Jordan	2–2	Friendly international

=== Shandong Luneng ===
No.	Date	Venue	Opponent	Score	Result	Competition
1.	24 February 2010	Hiroshima Big Arch, Hiroshima, Japan	(Japan) Sanfrecce Hiroshima	1–0	1–0	2010 AFC Champions League
2.	13 April 2010	Shandong Stadium, Jinan, China	(Japan) Sanfrecce Hiroshima	1–0	2–3	2010 AFC Champions League

== Honours ==
=== Club ===
Shandong Luneng

- Chinese Super League: 2006, 2008, 2010
- Chinese FA Cup: 2004, 2006, 2014
- Chinese Super League Cup: 2004
- Chinese FA Super Cup: 2015

=== Individual ===
- Chinese FA Cup Top Scorer: 2006
