= Xu Yang =

Xu Yang may refer to:

- Xu Yang (Qing dynasty) (born 1712), court painter to the Qianlong emperor of the Qing dynasty
- Xu Yang (high jumper) (born 1970), Chinese high jumper
- Xu Yang (speed skater) (born 1977), Chinese female long track speed skater

== Footballers ==
Surnamed Xu

- Xu Yang (footballer, born 1974), former China national football team player, played for Beijing Guoan (2000) and Shandong Luneng (2001–2004)
- Xu Yang (footballer, born 1979), Shanghai Shenhua player
- Xu Yang (footballer, born 1987), Henan Construction player

Surnamed Yang

- Yang Xu (born 1987), Chinese footballer
