= Yuan Weiwei =

Chinese footballer

Yuan Weiwei 苑维玮
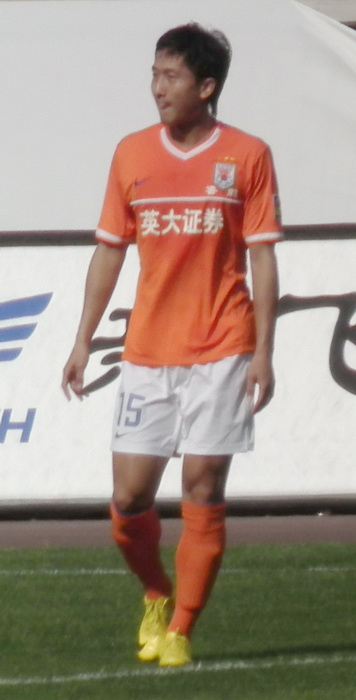

Personal information
- Date of birth: November 25, 1985 (age 40)
- Place of birth: Tianjin, China
- Height: 1.82 m (6 ft 0 in)
- Position: Defender

Youth career
- 1996–2000: Tianjin Locomotive
- 2000–2002: Shandong Luneng

Senior career*
Years	Team	Apps	(Gls)
2003–2013	Shandong Luneng	209	(0)
2014–2016	Tianjin Teda	16	(0)
2017	Yinchuan Helanshan	13	(0)
2018	Hunan Billows	10	(0)

International career^{‡}
2003–2005	China U20		
2007–2008	China U23		
2008–2012	China	3	(0)

Managerial career
- 2020: Tianjin Tianhai U14
- 2022: Shenzhen FC U21
- 2023: Shenzhen FC (assistant)
- 2025: Tai'an Tiankuang
Medal record
Representing China
Men's football
AFC Youth Championship
Silver medal – second place	2004 َ Malaysia	Team
- * Club domestic league appearances and goals as of 13 October 2018 ‡ National team caps and goals as of 8 June 2013

Yuan Weiwei (simplified Chinese: 苑维玮; traditional Chinese: 苑維瑋; pinyin: Yuàn Wéiwěi; born November 25, 1985, in Tianjin) is a Chinese former footballer.

== Club career ==
He started his professional career at Shandong Luneng playing as understudy to Wang Chao for the left-back position, making numerous appearances off the bench as his replacement. This would continue throughout the 2004 league season when Yuan Weiwei would play in twelve league games, three of which he actually started. For several more seasons, this would continue and Yuan Weiwei would be part of the squad that saw Shandong win the 2004 and 2006 league cups as well as winning the 2006 league title. It was however not until the 2008 season that saw the prominence of Yuan Weiwei establish himself as Shandong Luneng's first choice left-back when he overtook Wang Chao within the team by starting in twenty-one league games for them.

After a stellar 2013 season, Yuan transferred to fellow Chinese Super League side Tianjin Tedaon 1 February 2014. He was released at the end of 2016 season.

On 23 June 2017, Yuan joined China League Two side Yinchuan Helanshan.

On 9 March 2018, Yuan transferred to League Two side Hunan Billows.

== International career ==
He made his senior debut for the national team in a friendly against Jordan in 2007, which China won 2–0. He was eligible to play for the Chinese under-23 national team that took part in the 2008 Summer Olympics where he played in two group games before being suspended for the third game, playing as first choice left-back for China.

== Honours ==
=== Club ===
Shandong Luneng

- Chinese Super League: 2006, 2008, 2010
- Chinese FA Cup: 2004, 2006
