= Jorge Costa (disambiguation) =

Jorge Costa (1971–2025) is a Portuguese football manager and former player.

Jorge Costa or Jorge da Costa may also refer to:

- Jorge Costa (racewalker) (born 1961), Portuguese race walker
- Jorge Costa Rogers (1870–1918), Chilean lawyer and politician
- Jorge Nuno Pinto da Costa (born 1937), Portuguese businessman
- Jorge da Costa (1406–1508), Portuguese cardinal
- Jorjão (footballer), full name Jorge Alberto da Costa Silva (born 1970), Brazilian footballer
