= 2006 Chinese FA Cup =

2006 The Chinese Football Association Cup
CFA Cup

Tournament details
- Country: China
- Teams: 28

Final positions
- Champions: Shandong Luneng Taishan (4th title)
- Runners-up: Dalian Shide
- Champions League: Shandong Luneng Taishan

Tournament statistics
- Matches played: 31
- Goals scored: 92 (2.97 per match)
- Top goal scorer(s): (China) Han Peng (5 goals)

2006 Chinese FA Cup (Chinese: 2006中国足球协会杯) was the 12th edition of Chinese FA Cup. The first round matches were kicked off on 15 March 2006, and the final took place on 18 November 2006.

== Results ==
=== First round ===
First round are single matches, with extra time and penalty shootout. The away team will progress to the next round if there were goals in the extra time and match remains in tie after extra time. Penalty shootout was used when both teams did not score in the extra time.

15 March	Shanxi Luhu	0 – 1	Tianjin Teda	Shanxi Province Stadium, Taiyuan
15:00			Lu Yan 55'

15 March	Zhejiang Greentown	2 – 1	Qingdao Jonoon	Huanglong Stadium, Hangzhou
15:00	Huang Long 74'; Tico 98'		Lü Gang 50' (pen.)

15 March	Inter Xi'an	2 – 0	Beijing Hongdeng	Shaanxi Province Stadium, Xi'an
15:00	Ayew 16'; Zhang Xincheng 83'

15 March	Jiangsu Sainty	5 – 0	Changchun Yatai	Wutaishan Stadium, Nanjing
15:30	Yin Youyou 11', 63'; Mushangazhike 18'; Liu Fei 55'; Liu Jiapeng 80'

15 March	Shenzhen Kingway	2 – 0	Shanghai Kangbo	Shenzhen Stadium, Shenzhen
15:30	Zhu Yongsheng 59'; Huang Fengtao 68'

15 March	Guangzhou Pharmaceutical	1 – 0	Nanchang Bayi	Yuexiushan Stadium, Guangzhou
15:30	Liu Xiaofeng 49'

15 March	Liaoning FC	1 – 2	Shenyang Ginde	Jinzhou City Stadium, Jinzhou
18:00	Chen Xing 53'		Puc 56', 60'

15 March	Wuhan Optics Valley	0 – 1	Shanghai United	Xinhua Road Sports Center, Wuhan
19:30			Zhang Xiaorui 40' (pen.)

15 March	Chongqing Lifan	2 – 2 (a.e.t.)	Henan Construction	Fuling Stadium, Chongqing
19:30	Wang Anzhi 10'; Fan Yun 120'		Tomić 20'; Zhang Miao 92'

16 March	Qingdao Hailifeng	1 – 0	Chengdu Blades	Tiantai Stadium, Qingdao
15:00	Yu Dabao 22'

Hunan Shoking (banned)	0 – 3	Nanjing Yoyo

Shanghai Shenhua	3 – 0	Yanbian FC (banned)

=== Second round ===
Second round are single matches, with extra time and penalty shootout. The away team will progress to the next round if there were goals in the extra time and match remains in tie after extra time. Penalty shootout was used when both teams did not score in the extra time.

5 April	Dalian Shide	4 – 1	Jiangsu Sainty	Jinzhou Stadium, Dalian
14:30	Yan Song 14'; Ma Shuai 21'; Wang Shouting 30'; Zhu Ting 89'		Wu Pingfeng 11'

5 April	Xiamen Blue Lions	2 – 1	Guangzhou Pharmaceutical	Xiamen Stadium, Xiamen
14:30	Jelić 72', 89'		Wen Xiaoming 34'

5 April	Inter Xi'an	2 – 1	Shanghai United	Baoji Stadium, Baoji
15:00	Huang Yong 46', 89'		Chang Lin 90'

5 April	Shenzhen Kingway	6 – 1	Nanjing Yoyo	Shenzhen Stadium, Shenzhen
15:30	Wansi 13', 24'; Fan Xiaodong 23'; Zhao Shen 38'; Sui Donglu 78'; Huang Fengtao 84'		Zhao Yucheng 18'

5 April	Beijing Guoan	0 – 2	Zhejiang Greentown	Fengtai Stadium, Beijing
15:30			Orlando 14', 78'

5 April	Shanghai Shenhua	5 – 1	Henan Construction	Yuanshen Sports Centre Stadium, Shanghai
15:30	Mao Jianqing 43'; Li Weifeng 51'; Ng Wai Chiu 67', 71'; Xiao Zhanbo 78'		Zhao Peng 86' (pen.)

5 April	Shandong Luneng Taishan	5 – 0	Qingdao Hailifeng	Shandong Provincial Stadium, Jinan
16:00	Gluščević 10', 17', 90+2'; Han Peng 30', 54'

5 April	Shenyang Ginde	1 – 1 (a.e.t.) (3 – 4 p)	Tianjin Teda	Wulihe Stadium, Shenyang
19:00	Puc 60'		Hao Junmin 84'
	Penalties
	Chen Tao (penalty missed); Liu Jianye (penalty scored); Yang Fusheng (penalty missed); Wang Suolong (penalty scored); Xu Yang (penalty scored)		(penalty scored) Cao Yang; (penalty missed) Zorić; (penalty scored) Mao Biao; (penalty scored) Wu Weian; (penalty scored) Li Benjian

=== Quarter-finals ===
==== First leg ====
29 June	Inter Xi'an	3 – 0	Xiamen Blue Lions	Shaanxi Province Stadium, Xi'an
16:30	Zheng Tao 51'; Shen Han 55'; Vicente 70'

29 June	Tianjin Teda	1 – 2	Dalian Shide	TEDA Football Stadium, Tianjin
19:30	Mao Biao 90+2'		Zou Jie 78'; Quan Lei 87'

29 June	Shanghai Shenhua	1 – 2	Shandong Luneng Taishan	Yuanshen Sports Centre Stadium, Shanghai
19:45	Du Wei 63'		Gao Yao 51'; Han Peng 57'

29 June	Shenzhen Kingway	2 – 1	Zhejiang Greentown	Ningxia Stadium, Yinchuan
20:00	Li Yi 13'; Zhao Kun 57'		Yang Zheng 23'

==== Second leg ====
8 July	Dalian Shide	1 – 0 (3 - 1 agg.)	Tianjin Teda	Jinzhou Stadium, Dalian
19:00	Zhao Xuri 38'

8 July	Zhejiang Greentown	2 – 0 (3 - 2 agg.)	Shenzhen Kingway	Huanglong Stadium, Hangzhou
19:00	Cao Xuan 58'; Ma Cheng 68'

8 July	Xiamen Blue Lions	0 – 2 (0 - 5 agg.)	Inter Xi'an	Jinjiang Sports Center, Jinjiang
19:30			Wang Peng 11'; Du Ping 84'

8 July	Shandong Luneng Taishan	1 – 0 (3 - 1 agg.)	Shanghai Shenhua	Shandong Provincial Stadium, Jinan
19:45	Zheng Zhi 23'

=== Semi-finals ===
==== First leg ====
12 August	Inter Xi'an	1 – 3	Shandong Luneng Taishan	Shaanxi Province Stadium, Xi'an
15:30	Wang Peng 63'		Li Jinyu 54'; Han Peng 61'; Pažin 81'

12 August	Zhejiang Greentown	1 – 3	Dalian Shide	Huanglong Stadium, Hangzhou
19:00	Orlando 89'		Zhu Ting 16'; Zou Jie 33'; Janković 78'

==== Second leg ====
1 September	Dalian Shide	3 – 4 (6 - 5 agg.)	Zhejiang Greentown	Jinzhou Stadium, Dalian
19:00	Zhu Ting 7'; Ma Shuai 83', 90+1'		Sun Wei 3', 14'; Jiao Fengbo 5'; Cai Chuchuan 25'

1 September	Shandong Luneng Taishan	1 – 0 (4 - 1 agg.)	Inter Xi'an	Shandong Provincial Stadium, Jinan
19:30	Živković 55'

=== Final ===
The final is a single match, with extra time and penalty shootout if necessary.

18 November
19:30

Shandong Luneng Taishan	2 – 0	Dalian Shide
Li Jinyu 33'; Han Peng 73'

Helong Stadium, Changsha
Referee: Subkhiddin Mohd Salleh (Malaysia)

Shandong	Dalian

Shandong:
GK	1	(China) Li Leilei
RB	25	(China) Jiao Zhe
CB	9	(Bulgaria) Predrag Pažin
CB	5	(China) Shu Chang (c)
LB	27	(China) Wang Liang
DM	18	(China) Zhou Haibin
RM	20	(China) Cui Peng		(substituted off) 81'
LM	8	(Serbia) Aleksandar Živković
AM	10	(China) Zheng Zhi	(yellow card) 69'
FW	29	(China) Li Jinyu		(substituted off) 87'
FW	6	(China) Han Peng
Substitutes used:
DF	2	(China) Liu Jindong		(substituted on) 87'
MF	13	(China) Wang Yongpo		(substituted on) 81'
Coach:
(Serbia) Ljubiša Tumbaković

Dalian:
GK	1	(China) Chen Dong
RB	12	(China) Wang Sheng
CB	5	(China) Feng Xiaoting
CB	6	(China) Zhang Yaokun (c)	(yellow card) 83'
LB	20	(China) Liu Yu
DM	7	(China) Zhao Xuri		(substituted off) 85'
DM	4	(China) Zhai Yanpeng
RM	8	(China) Zhu Ting
LM	10	(Serbia) Miodrag Pantelić	(yellow card) 5' (red card) 65'
FW	9	(Bulgaria) Zoran Janković
FW	17	(China) Zou Jie
Substitutes used:
MF	26	(China) Zhang Yalin		(substituted on) 85'
Coach:
(China) Lin Lefeng
