= Gao Yao (footballer) =

Chinese footballer

Gao Yao 高尧
Personal information
- Full name: Gao Yao
- Date of birth: July 13, 1978 (age 48)
- Place of birth: Qingdao, Shandong, China
- Height: 1.85 m (6 ft 1 in)
- Positions: Midfielder; defender

Youth career
- 1991–1997: Shandong Luneng

Senior career*
Years	Team	Apps	(Gls)
1998–2009	Shandong Luneng	150	(8)

International career^{‡}
2000–2002	China	6	(0)

Managerial career
- 2014: Qingdao Jonoon (assistant)
- 2015–2018: Hebei China Fortune (assistant)
- 2019–2021: Kunshan FC
Medal record
Representing China
Men's football
AFC Youth Championship
Silver medal – second place	1996 َ South Korea	Team
- * Club domestic league appearances and goals as of December 2009 ‡ National team caps and goals as of December 2009

Gao Yao (simplified Chinese: 高尧; traditional Chinese: 高堯; pinyin: Gāo Yáo; born July 13, 1978) is a former Chinese football player who was able to play in both midfield or defence. He was known as a 'One club man' as he spent his whole career with Shandong Luneng playing in the Chinese Super League, while internationally he was also included in the Chinese team that was a participant at the 2002 FIFA World Cup.

== Club career ==
After playing for the Shandong Luneng youth team Gao Yao would move up to the senior team in 1998 to start his professional football career where in his debut season he would play in 3 league games. Under the new head coach Slobodan Santrač he would immediately rise to become an integral member of the 1999 Shandong team that won the league and cup double. When Slobodan Santrač left after the 2000 league season Gao Yao was a firmly established member of the first team despite several changes in management over the next several seasons. It wasn't until the introduction of Ljubiša Tumbaković in 2004 as Shandong's new head coach when they would return to their winning ways and Gao Yao would continue to add to his honours when he won another league title in the 2006 league season. By the 2007 league season Gao Yao had, however dropped out of the first team and he saw his playing time limited when Liu Jindong emerged as Ljubiša Tumbaković's preferred option.

== International career ==
On April 25, 2000 Gao Yao would make his debut in a friendly against Hong Kong in a 1-0 win. After several further friendlies in preparation for the 2002 FIFA World Cup Gao Yao was the surprise inclusions in the squad despite never playing in any competitive games. The Chinese head coach Bora Milutinović stated that he wanted a versatile player who was also good a man marker, however during the tournament he did not play in any of the games at the tournament when China were knocked out in the group stages. After the tournament he was not called up in China's next squad and has not been capped since the end of 2002.

== End of football career ==
On 29 January 2026, Gao was given a lifetime ban for match-fixing by the Chinese Football Association.

== Honours ==
Shandong Luneng

- Chinese Jia-A League/Chinese Super League: 1999, 2006, 2008
- Chinese FA Cup: 1999, 2004, 2006
- Chinese Super League Cup: 2004
