= Zhou Haibin =

Chinese footballer (born 1985)

Zhou Haibin 周海滨
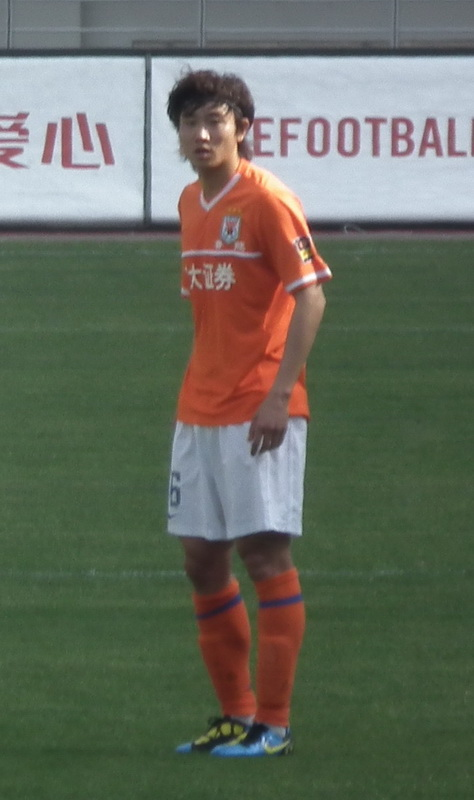
- Haibin in 2010

Personal information
- Full name: Zhou Haibin
- Date of birth: 19 July 1985 (age 41)
- Place of birth: Dalian, Liaoning, China
- Height: 1.85 m (6 ft 1 in)
- Position: Midfielder

Youth career
- 1999–2002: Shandong Luneng

Senior career*
Years	Team	Apps	(Gls)
2003–2009	Shandong Luneng	128	(18)
2009	PSV Eindhoven	0	(0)
2010–2013	Shandong Luneng	69	(5)
2013	→ Tianjin Teda (loan)	13	(1)
2014–2016	Tianjin Teda	75	(11)
2017–2019	Shandong Luneng	39	(2)

International career^{‡}
2003–2011	China	43	(3)

Managerial career
- 2020: China U19 (trainer)
- 2021: China U19 (assistant)
- 2022–2024: Shandong Taishan U19
- 2025–: China U15
Medal record
Representing China
Men's football
AFC Asian Cup
Silver medal – second place	2004 China	Team
East Asian Football Championship
Bronze medal – third place	2003 Japan	Team
Bronze medal – third place	2008 China	Team
Gold medal – first place	2005 South Korea	Team
East Asian Games
Gold medal – first place	2001 Macau	Football
AFC Youth Championship
Silver medal – second place	2004 َ Malaysia	Team
- * Club domestic league appearances and goals as of 31 December 2019 ‡ National team caps and goals as of 17 April 2015

Zhou Haibin (simplified Chinese: 周海滨; traditional Chinese: 周海濱; pinyin: Zhōu Hǎibīn; born 19 July 1985) is a Chinese football coach and retired professional footballer who spent the majority of his playing career at Chinese Super League club Shandong Luneng.

== Club career ==
=== Early career ===
In October 1999, Zhou Haibin joined Shandong Luneng's youth academy at age 14 and was a standout player for the youth sides. Zhou broke into the first team, after impressing in the youth academy, in the 2003 season and became a regular for Shandong. He scored his first goal for the club on 31 July 2003 in a league game with Shenyang Ginde.

=== PSV Eindhoven ===
Zhou joined Eredivisie side PSV Eindhoven in February 2009 on a free transfer from Shandong Luneng. There were some issues however between PSV Eindhoven and the KNVB on one side and the Chinese Football Association on the other, the latter having the right to hold released players for 30 more months. However, on 7 February 2009, PSV Eindhoven officially confirmed the capture of Zhou on a free transfer. He signed a one-year contract with an option for a further two-and-a-half-year extension. On 7 October 2009, then manager Fred Rutten announced in an interview with Algemeen Dagblad that the club would not extend Zhou's contract at the end of his current deal and Zhou was officially released on 28 December 2009.

=== Shandong Luneng ===
On 10 January 2010, Zhou returned to his homeland by signing with former club Chinese Super League side Shandong Luneng again. During the 2012 season, Zhou had a disappointing year for Shandong as he lost his starting spot and only played six games the whole season.

=== Tianjin Teda ===
On 17 July 2013, Shandong Luneng confirmed that Zhou was loaned out to fellow Chinese Super League side Tianjin Teda for six months. He permanently transferred to the club at the beginning of the 2013 season after the successful loan spell. He made his debut for the club after his permanent transfer in a 1–1 draw against Guangzhou R&F on 9 March 2014. He scored his first goal for the club after permanently transferring to them on 11 April 2014 in a 5–2 loss to Guangzhou Evergrande.

=== Shandong Luneng ===
On 8 January 2017, Zhou returned to Shandong Luneng.

== International career ==
On 1 June 2004, Zhou became the youngest player ever to score for the Chinese national team in a 2–1 win against Hungary.

He competed for China at the 2008 Summer Olympics.

== Career statistics ==
=== Club statistics ===
Appearances and goals by club, season and competition
Club	Season	League			National Cup		League Cup		Continental		Total	
Club	Season	Division	Apps	Goals	Apps	Goals	Apps	Goals	Apps	Goals	Apps	Goals
Shandong Luneng	2003	Chinese Jia-A League	21	1	1	0	-		-		22	1
Shandong Luneng	2004	Chinese Super League	15	5	5	1	1	0	-		21	6
Shandong Luneng	2005	Chinese Super League	23	4	5	0		0	1	1	29	5
Shandong Luneng	2006	Chinese Super League	22	3	6	0	-		-		28	3
Shandong Luneng	2007	Chinese Super League	26	2	-		-		6	0	32	2
Shandong Luneng	2008	Chinese Super League	21	3	-		-		-		21	3
Shandong Luneng	Total		128	18	17	1	1	0	7	1	153	20
PSV Eindhoven	2008-09	Eredivisie	0	0	0	0	-		0	0	0	0
PSV Eindhoven	2009-10	Eredivisie	0	0	0	0	-		0	0	0	0
PSV Eindhoven	Total		0	0	0	0	0	0	0	0	0	0
Shandong Luneng	2010	Chinese Super League	25	5	-		-		6	0	31	5
Shandong Luneng	2011	Chinese Super League	27	0	3	0	-		6	1	36	1
Shandong Luneng	2012	Chinese Super League	6	0	1	0	-		-		7	0
Shandong Luneng	2013	Chinese Super League	11	0	1	0	-		-		12	0
Shandong Luneng	Total		69	5	5	0	0	0	12	1	86	6
Tianjin Teda (loan)	2013	Chinese Super League	13	1	0	0	-		-		13	1
Tianjin Teda	2014	Chinese Super League	28	5	1	0	-		-		29	5
Tianjin Teda	2015	Chinese Super League	25	5	0	0	-		-		25	5
Tianjin Teda	2016	Chinese Super League	22	1	1	0	-		-		23	1
Tianjin Teda	Total		75	11	2	0	0	0	0	0	77	11
Shandong Luneng	2017	Chinese Super League	10	0	2	0	-		-		12	0
Shandong Luneng	2018	Chinese Super League	13	0	4	0	-		-		17	0
Shandong Luneng	2019	Chinese Super League	16	2	4	0	-		9	2	29	4
Shandong Luneng	Total		39	2	10	0	0	0	9	2	58	4
Career total			324	37	34	1	1	0	28	4	387	42

=== International goals ===
Results list China's goal tally first.

#	Date	Venue	Opponent	Score	Result	Competition
1	1 June 2004	(China) Tianjin	Hungary	1–1	2–1	Friendly international
2	17 February 2008	(China) Chongqing	South Korea	1–1	2–3	2008 East Asian Football Championship
3	14 June 2008	(China) Tianjin	Iraq	1–0	1–2	2010 FIFA World Cup qualifier

== Honours ==
Shandong Luneng

- Chinese Super League: 2006, 2008, 2010
- Chinese FA Cup: 2004, 2006
- Chinese Super League Cup: 2004

China PR

- East Asian Football Championship: 2005
