= Blaž Puc =

Slovenian association football player

Personal information
- Date of birth: 29 January 1978 (age 48)
- Place of birth: Slovenia
- Position: Forward

Senior career*
Years	Team	Apps	(Gls)
1993-1994	Svoboda Ljubljana	2	(0)
1999–2005	Olimpija Ljubljana	117	(22)
2005–2006	Bela Krajina	16	(3)
2006	Shenyang Ginde		
2007–2008	Celje	25	(4)
2008–2009	Diagoras		(3)
2009	Mura	12	(1)
2010	Ivančna Gorica	6	(1)
2010–2011	ATUS Ferlach	42	(18)
2012–2017	ATUS Guttaring	104	(63)

Managerial career
- 2022-: Tabor '69
- * Club domestic league appearances and goals

Blaž Puc (Chinese: 普科; 人born 29 January 1978 in Slovenia) is a Slovenian retired footballer.

== China ==
Contributing two goals as Shenyang Ginde eliminated Liaoning from the 2006 Chinese FA Cup with a 2-1 scoreline, Puc was able to collaborate with Guinean Ousmane Bangoura who assisted his goals, but picked up a red card at the conclusion of April which led to a mass brawl with Liaoning, their second matchup with them that season.

Unable to adapt to Shenyang's inclement weather, the Slovene stated that gameplay of the Chinese Super League was very slow and not aggressive.
