= 2004 Chinese Super League =

Chinese Super League
- Season: 2004
- Champions: Shenzhen Jianlibao
- Relegated: N/A
- AFC Champions League: Shenzhen Jianlibao; Shandong Luneng
- A3 Champions Cup: Shenzhen Jianlibao
- Matches: 132
- Goals: 363 (2.75 per match)
- Top goalscorer: Kwame Ayew (17 goals)
- Average attendance: 10,838

The 2004 Chinese Super League was the debut season of the establishment of the Chinese Football Association Super League (中国足球协会超级联赛 or 中超), also known as the Chinese Super League. Sponsored by Siemens Mobile, it is the eleventh season of professional association football league and the 43rd top-tier league season in China. The premier football league in China under the auspices of the Chinese Football Association, the season started on May 15 and ended December 4 where it was planned that no teams would be relegated at the end of the season.

== Promotion and relegation ==
Teams promoted from 2003 Jia-B League

- None

Teams relegated after end of 2003 Jia-A League

- Chongqing Qiche (Merged with Yunnan Hongta)
- August 1st
- Shaanxi Guoli

== Overview ==
The first Chinese Super League (CSL) season was greeted with great enthusiasm by the media and the FA, with the decision to create a new top tier league in China made in order to freshen up Chinese football. The previous ten seasons of the old Chinese first division had been successful and had improved the quality of play in China. However, the Chinese Football Association felt that a change was needed to give Chinese football a further boost.

The decision to create the Chinese Super League was made before the 2003 Chinese season and of the 15 First Division teams competing in the 2003 season, it was decided that three teams would be relegated with no promotion at all from the second tier league. The remaining 12 teams would compete in the inaugural Super League season, which saw Chongqing Qiche remain within the league despite being relegated after they merged with seventh place team Yunnan Hongta.

It was planned that one team would be relegated with two teams to be promoted into the CSL at the end of the season but the relegation was cancelled halfway through and so for the second season the Super League had 14 teams.

== Controversy ==
There were many controversial events during the season, including the discovery that some players were betting against their own teams and deliberately losing games. Some referees were also suspected of fixing matches by awarding dubious penalties and handing out cards freely.

The most notorious incidents happened during two matches, a Round 14 game involving Beijing Hyundai and a Round 17 game involving Dalian Shide: in the respective matches, the players were unhappy about the refereeing, and they protested by walking off and abandoning the match. The CFA handed out punishments with a three-point deduction for Beijing Hyundai and a six-point deduction for Dalian Shide: their opponents were also awarded a 3-0 victory.

== Upsets ==
The season produced one of the biggest upset in Chinese football history. Shenzhen Jianlibao, coached by Zhu Guanghu, was facing financial problems and owed its players several months of salary. However, they still managed to finish as champions and even more remarkably, their defence only conceded 13 goals in 22 matches, the least in the league.

Another team causing an upset at the wrong end of the table was Shanghai Shenhua who had been Champions in the previous season and during the 2004 season had played in the prestigious AFC Champions League. However, they played poorly in the 2004 season and finished 3rd from bottom, only 1 point above bottom placed team, Chongqing Qiche. If there had been relegation in the season, Shanghai would have found themselves battling against the drop.

== Personnel ==
Team	Manager
Beijing Hyundai	(China) Wei Kexing
Chongqing Qiche	(Romania) Viorel Hizo
Dalian Shide	(China) Hao Haidong (caretaker)
Inter Shanghai	(China) Cheng Yaodong
Liaoning Zhongyu	(China) Ma Lin
Qingdao Beilaite	(China) Wang Weiman (caretaker)
Shandong Luneng	(Serbia and Montenegro) Ljubiša Tumbaković
Shanghai Shenhua	(Russia) Valery Nepomnyashchy
Shenyang Ginde	
Shenzhen Jianlibao	(China) Zhu Guanghu
Sichuan Guangdong	(China) Gao Huichen
Tianjin TEDA	(China) Liu Chunming

== Foreign players ==
The number of foreign players is restricted to three, but all teams can only use two foreign players on the field in each game. Players from Hong Kong, Macau and Chinese Taipei are deemed to be native players in CSL.

- Players name in **bold** indicates the player is registered during the mid-season transfer window.
- Players in italics were out of the squad or left the club within the season, after the pre-season transfer window, or in the mid-season transfer window, and at least had one appearance.

Club	Player 1	Player 2	Player 3	Former players
Beijing Hyundai	(Hungary) Krisztián Kenesei	(Romania) **Dan Alexa**	(Serbia and Montenegro) Branko Jelić	
Chongqing Qiche	(Croatia) Ivan Bulat	(Romania) **Radu Niculescu**	(Romania) **Viorel Domocoș**	(Romania) Constantin Schumacher (Romania) Victor Naicu
Dalian Shide	(Brazil) Adilson	(Bulgaria) **Zoran Janković**	(Slovenia) Ermin Šiljak	(Cameroon) Christian Pouga
Inter Shanghai	(Brazil) Zé Alcino	(Ghana) Kwame Ayew	(Nigeria) Kola Adams	
Liaoning Zhongyu	(Bosnia and Herzegovina) Alen Avdić	(Cameroon) Clément Lebe	(Serbia and Montenegro) **Branko Savić**	
Qingdao Beilaite	(Croatia) **Josip Bulat**	(Ukraine) Oleksandr Holovko	(Ukraine) **Serhiy Konovalov**	(Brazil) André Gaspar (Portugal) **Joaquim Ferraz**
Shandong Luneng	(France) Nicolas Ouédec	(Serbia and Montenegro) Darko Anić	(Serbia and Montenegro) **Vladimir Matijašević**	
Shanghai Shenhua	(Germany) Jörg Albertz	(Honduras) Saúl Martínez	(Uruguay) Peter Vera	
Shenyang Ginde	(Bosnia and Herzegovina) **Sead Bučan**	(Nigeria) Prince Ikpe Ekong	(Nigeria) Sam Ayorinde	
Shenzhen Jianlibao	(Brazil) Nelson Simões	(Poland) **Marek Zając**	(Togo) Djima Oyawolé	(Brazil) Auricélio Neres (Brazil) Ozeias (Hungary) Zoltán Kovács
Sichuan Guancheng	(Serbia and Montenegro) Miodrag Pantelić	(South Korea) **Lee Kyung-soo**	(Sweden) Daniel Nannskog	
Tianjin TEDA	(Belarus) **Alyaksandr Khatskevich**	(Romania) Bogdan Mara	(Romania) **Ionel Gane**	(Argentina) José Luis Díaz (Brazil) Ricardo (Turkey) Ahmet Dursun

== League table ==
Pos	Team	Pld	W	D	L	GF	GA	GD	Pts	Qualification or relegation
1	Shenzhen Jianlibao (C)	22	11	9	2	30	13	+17	42	Qualification to AFC Champions League group stage
2	Shandong Luneng	22	10	6	6	44	29	+15	36	Qualification to AFC Champions League group stage
3	Inter Shanghai	22	8	8	6	39	31	+8	32	
4	Liaoning Zhongyu	22	10	2	10	39	40	−1	32	
5	Dalian Shide (Note: Dalian Shide were deducted 6 points for walking off to protest the refereeing.)	22	10	6	6	33	29	+4	30	
6	Tianjin TEDA	22	7	8	7	28	29	−1	29	
7	Beijing Hyundai (Note: Beijing Hyundai were deducted 3 points for walking off to protest the refereeing.)	22	8	7	7	35	33	+2	28	
8	Shenyang Ginde	22	7	5	10	23	29	−6	26	
9	Sichuan Guancheng	22	4	11	7	29	37	−8	23	
10	Shanghai Shenhua	22	4	10	8	28	37	−9	22	
11	Qingdao Beilaite	22	4	9	9	21	28	−7	21	
12	Chongqing Qiche	22	4	9	9	14	31	−17	21	

(C) Champions

== Top scorers ==
Rank	Scorer	Club	Goals
1	(Ghana) Kwame Ayew	Inter Shanghai	17
2	(China) Li Jinyu	Shandong Luneng	13
3	(Serbia and Montenegro) Branko Jelić	Beijing Hyundai	11
4	(China) Li Xiaopeng	Shandong Luneng	10
5	(China) Tao Wei	Beijing Hyundai	9
5	(Slovenia) Ermin Šiljak	Dalian Shide	9
5	(Sweden) Daniel Nannskog	Sichuan Guancheng	9
8	(Togo) Djima Oyawolé	Shenzhen Jianlibao	8
9	(Brazil) Zé Alcino	Inter Shanghai	7
9	(China) Guo Hui	Liaoning Zhongyu	7
9	(China) Yu Genwei	Tianjin TEDA	7

== Attendances ==
=== League ===
- Total attendance: 1,430,600
- Average attendance: 10,838

=== Clubs ===
Football club	Average attendance
Shandong Luneng	23,636
Chongqing Qiche	15,727
Shanghai Shenhua	13,636
Tianjin TEDA	13,182
Dalian Shide	11,273
Shenzhen Jianlibao	10,364
Beijing Hyundai	10,864
Inter Shanghai	8,455
Liaoning Zhongyu	7,727
Sichuan Guancheng	5,545
Shenyang Ginde	5,000
Qingdao Beilaite	4,645

== See also ==
- Chinese Super League
- Football in China
- Chinese Football Association
- Chinese Football Association Jia League
- Chinese Football Association Yi League
- Chinese FA Cup
