= Kola Adams =

Nigerian footballer

Personal information
- Full name: Kola Modupe Adams
- Date of birth: 18 November 1980 (age 45)
- Place of birth: Nigeria
- Position: Defender

Senior career*
Years	Team	Apps	(Gls)
- Clermont Foot
- Shanghai SIPG F.C.
2005/06-2007	AS Moulins	8+	(1+)
2007/2008	Moulins Yzeure Foot		
2008/2009	Feignies Aulnoye FC		
2009/2010	FC Nevers 58		
2011/2012	FC Souvigny		

International career
2003	Nigeria	1	(0)
- * Club domestic league appearances and goals

Kola Modupe Adams (Chinese: 阿达姆斯; born 18 November 1980 in Nigeria) is a Nigerian retired footballer.

== Career ==
After playing for French club Clermont Foot, Adams signed for Shanghai SIPG in the Chinese top flight, where he stayed for a few seasons.

For 2005/06, he returned to France with AS Moulins before playing for Moulins Yzeure Foot, Feignies Aulnoye, Nevers 58, and Souvigny in the French lower leagues.

In 2003, Adams made his solitary appearance for the Nigeria national team, in a 3-0 friendly loss to Japan.
