= Li Jinyu =

Chinese footballer and coach

Li Jinyu 李金羽
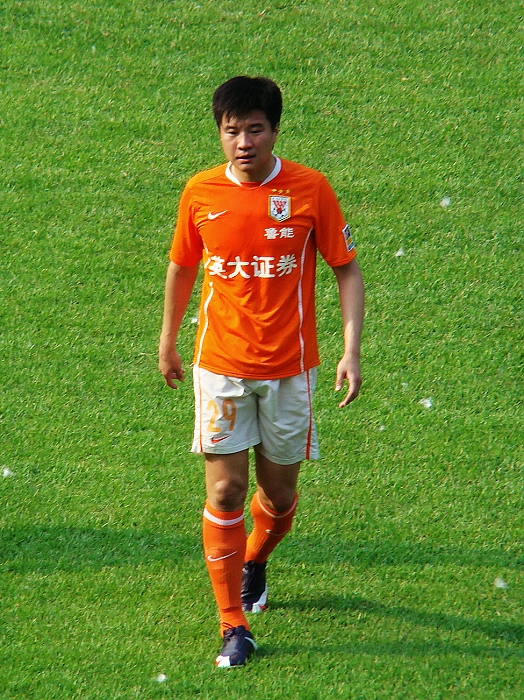

Personal information
- Full name: Li Jinyu
- Date of birth: 6 July 1977 (age 49)
- Place of birth: Shenyang, Liaoning, China
- Height: 1.80 m (5 ft 11 in)
- Position: Striker

Youth career
- 1993–1998: Shenzhen Youth

Senior career*
Years	Team	Apps	(Gls)
1998–2003	Liaoning FC	100	(46)
1999	→ AS Nancy (loan)	6	(0)
2004–2010	Shandong Luneng	151	(74)
Total		257	(120)

International career^{‡}
1997–2008	China	70	(24)

Managerial career
- 2011: China Women (assistant)
- 2012–2013: Shenyang Shenbei (assistant)
- 2013–2014: Shenyang Shenbei
- 2016: Shijiazhuang Ever Bright (caretaker)
- 2017: Jiangsu Suning (caretaker)
- 2021–2023: Wuhan Yangtze River
- 2023–2024: Yunnan Yukun
- 2024–2026: Liaoning Tieren
Medal record
Men's football
Representing China
AFC Asian Cup
Silver medal – second place	2004 China	Team
Asian Games
Bronze medal – third place	1998 Bangkok	Football
EAFF Championship
Gold medal – first place	2005 South Korea	Team
- * Club domestic league appearances and goals as of 20 October 2013 ‡ National team caps and goals as of 20 October 2013

Li Jinyu (Chinese: 李金羽; pinyin: Lǐ Jīnyǔ; born 6 July 1977) is a Chinese football coach and former international football player.

As a player he represented Liaoning Whowin and Shandong Luneng in the Chinese Super League and spent one season on loan at French club AS Nancy. He is also currently the top goalscorer in Chinese professional league history and won the Golden Boot Award three times in the process.

== Club career ==
One of the premier strikers in China, Li Jinyu earned his reputation early when he was the stars of the Chinese youth team that studied in Brazil for a training programme sponsored by Shenzhen Jianlibao. This then saw him called up to the Chinese under-20 national team and gave him a chance to play in the 1997 FIFA World Youth Championship which attracted the interests of French side AS Nancy who acquired him on loan for one season. Li's time at AS Nancy was not successful and he would return to China to sign with Liaoning Whowin, immediately showing his potential that was missing at AS Nancy when he became an integral member of the team that narrowly lost out on the league title in 1999. While he would personally win his first Golden Boot award in 2002, he did not win any trophies with his club Liaoning during his time with them.

At the beginning of the 2004 league season, Shandong Luneng were willing to pay 4,900,000 yuan to make him the most expensive signing in Chinese football transfer history at the time. He would immediately become an integral member of the team and would repay them by helping them win the Chinese FA Cup and Chinese Super League Cup at the end of the season. The 2006 league season would see him reach his peak when he won the league title, the Chinese FA Cup, and the Golden Boot award with the team. The 2007 league season would see him officially become the most prolific player within the league when he broke Hao Haidong's goal record, however he could not aid Shandong to another league title. Despite his tradition in scoring, his prolific goalscoring dropped during the 2008 league season when he only scored six goals, nevertheless he was still able to win another league title. By the 2010 league season, Li would become a fringe player within the team, however he would still go on to win the league title once more and decided to retire at the end of the season.

== International career ==
After playing in the 1997 FIFA World Youth Championship for the Chinese under-20 national team, Li would immediately move to the senior team and would make his debut in a friendly against the United States in a 1-1 draw on 1 February 1997. This then saw him become a regular with the Chinese national team and saw him play in several unsuccessful World Cup qualifiers. His biggest achievement came in the 2004 AFC Asian Cup where he was an integral member of the team that was runners-up in the tournament. When China qualified for the 2007 AFC Asian Cup, then manager Zhu Guanghu dropped him from the squad to take part in the tournament because he believed that his performances were not convincing enough to be included in the squad.

== Management career ==
Li started his managerial career by becoming the assistant coach of the Chinese women's national team and Shenyang Shenbei. On 13 May 2013, he was appointed as the new manager of China League One side Shenyang Shenbei, replacing Liu Zhicai who was sacked from the club on the same day after a string of poor results.

On 4 May 2026, Liaoning Tieren announced Li's departure after 9 games of 2026 season.

== Career statistics ==
=== Club ===
Club	Season	League		
Club	Season	Division	Apps	Goals
Liaoning FC	1998	Chinese Jia-A League	0	0
Liaoning FC	1999	Chinese Jia-A League	13	8
Liaoning FC	2000	Chinese Jia-A League	24	5
Liaoning FC	2001	Chinese Jia-A League	22	11
Liaoning FC	2002	Chinese Jia-A League	27	15
Liaoning FC	2003	Chinese Jia-A League	14	7
Liaoning FC	Total		100	46
AS Nancy	1998–99	French Division 1	6	0
AS Nancy	Total		6	0
Shandong Luneng	2004	Chinese Jia-A League	21	13
Shandong Luneng	2005	Chinese Jia-A League	17	7
Shandong Luneng	2006	Chinese Jia-A League	26	26
Shandong Luneng	2007	Chinese Jia-A League	27	15
Shandong Luneng	2008	Chinese Jia-A League	24	6
Shandong Luneng	2009	Chinese Jia-A League	22	3
Shandong Luneng	2010	Chinese Jia-A League	14	4
Shandong Luneng	Total		151	74
Total			257	120

=== International goals ===
#	Date	Venue	Opponent	Score	Result	Competition
1	21 February 1997	Merdeka Stadium, Kuala Lumpur, Malaysia	Singapore	2-0	3-1	1997 Dunhill Cup Malaysia
2	2 March 1997	Merdeka Stadium, Kuala Lumpur, Malaysia	Bosnia and Herzegovina	1-0	3-0	1997 Dunhill Cup Malaysia
3	20 April 1997	Workers Stadium, Beijing, China	Myanmar	3-0	5-0	Friendly international
4	1 June 1997	Workers Stadium, Beijing, China	Turkmenistan	1-0	1-0	1998 FIFA World Cup qualifier
5	30 November 1998	Surat Thani Province Stadium, Surat Thani, Thailand	Lebanon	3-1	4-1	1998 Asian Games
6	8 December 1998	Rajamangala Stadium, Bangkok, Thailand	Tajikistan	2-1	3-1	1998 Asian Games
7	10 December 1998	Suphachalasai Stadium, Bangkok, Thailand	Oman	3-0	6-1	1998 Asian Games
8	10 December 1998	Suphachalasai Stadium, Bangkok, Thailand	Oman	4-0	6-1	1998 Asian Games
9	12 December 1998	Suphachalasai Stadium, Bangkok, Thailand	Iran	1-0	1-2	1998 Asian Games
10	14 December 1998	Suphachalasai Stadium, Bangkok, Thailand	Turkmenistan	1-0	3-0	1998 Asian Games
12	6 May 2001	Lambert Stadium, Phnom Penh, Cambodia	Cambodia	1-0	4-0	2002 FIFA World Cup qualifier
13	6 May 2001	Lambert Stadium, Phnom Penh, Cambodia	Cambodia	4-0	4-0	2002 FIFA World Cup qualifier
14	31 August 2003	Lockhart Stadium, Fort Lauderdale, United States	Haiti	3-1	3-4	Friendly international
15	3 July 2004	Chongqing Olympic Sports Center, Chongqing, China	Lebanon	1-0	6-0	Friendly international
16	3 July 2004	Chongqing Olympic Sports Center, Chongqing, China	Lebanon	2-0	6-0	Friendly international
17	17 July 2004	Workers Stadium, Beijing, China	Bahrain	2-1	2-2	2004 AFC Asian Cup
18	8 September 2004	City Stadium, Penang, Malaysia	Malaysia	1-0	1-0	2006 FIFA World Cup qualifier
19	17 November 2004	Tianhe Stadium, Guangzhou, China	Hong Kong	1-0	7-0	2006 FIFA World Cup qualifier
20	17 November 2004	Tianhe Stadium, Guangzhou, China	Hong Kong	4-0	7-0	2006 FIFA World Cup qualifier
21	3 September 2005	Daejeon World Cup Stadium, Daejeon, South Korea	Japan	1-0	2-2	2005 East Asian Football Championship
22	10 September 2006	Qinhuangdao Olympic Sports Center Stadium, Qinhuangdao, China	Thailand	1-0	4-0	Friendly international
23	7 February 2007	Suzhou Sports Center, Suzhou, China	Kazakhstan	2-1	2-1	Friendly international
24	21 October 2007	Century Lotus Stadium, Foshan, China	Myanmar	5-0	7-0	2010 FIFA World Cup qualifier

=== Management statistics ===
As of 20 July 2024.

Team	Nat	From	To	Record				
Team	Nat	From	To	G	W	D	L	Win %
Shenyang Zhongze	(China)	13 May 2013	12 May 2014	32	12	11	9	37.50
Shijiazhuang Ever Bright (caretaker)	(China)	15 July 2016	30 October 2016	13	4	4	5	30.77
Jiangsu Suning (caretaker)	(China)	1 June 2017	11 June 2017	1	0	0	1	0.00
Wuhan Yangtze River	(China)	4 December 2021	25 January 2023	43	10	7	26	23.26
Yunnan Yukun	(China)	7 September 2023	22 May 2024	16	13	2	1	81.25
Liaoning Tieren	(China)	2 July 2024	present	3	2	1	0	66.67
Total				98	41	15	42	41.84

== Honours ==
=== Player ===
==== Club ====
Shandong Luneng

- Chinese Super League: 2006, 2008, 2010
- Chinese FA Cup: 2004, 2006
- Chinese Super League Cup: 2004

==== International ====
China PR national football team

- East Asian Football Championship: 2005

==== Individual ====
- Chinese Super League Top goalscorer: 2006, 2007
- Chinese Super League Team of the Year: 2002, 2004, 2006, 2007

=== Manager ===
Liaoning Tieren

- China League One: 2025

== See also ==
- List of football records in China
