= Xiao Junlong =

Chinese footballer (born 2000)

Personal information
- Date of birth: 3 November 2000 (age 26)
- Place of birth: Tianjin, China
- Position: Right-back

Team information
- Current team: Shijiazhuang Gongfu
- Number: 15

Youth career
- Beijing Guoan
- 2014–2015: Shandong Luneng Taishan
- 2016–2018: Beijing Guoan
- 2018: Ituano
- 2019–2022: Santos
- 2022: Fortaleza

Senior career*
Years	Team	Apps	(Gls)
2023	Mirassol	0	(0)
2024	Tianjin Jinmen Tiger	0	(0)
2025–	Shijiazhuang Gongfu	0	(0)
- * Club domestic league appearances and goals as of 17:14, 30 January 2023 (UTC)

Xiao Junlong (Chinese: 肖俊龙; born 3 November 2000), is a Chinese footballer who plays as a right-back for Shijiazhuang Gongfu. Besides China, he has played in Brazil.

== Club career ==
Born in Tianjin, Xiao started his career with Beijing Guoan. He had a brief spell with Shandong Luneng Taishan in 2014 and 2015, spending time with their overseas football camp in Brazil. He trained with Brazilian side Ituano, before the expiration of his contract with Beijing Guoan in 2018, at which time he joined Ituano permanently.

The following year, he trained with Santos, who were unable to offer him an official contract at the time, due to the nature of his visa. On 24 August 2021, having overcome an ankle injury, he signed a three-year contract with Santos.

Despite Xiao's release clause being a reported €100 million, he was released by Santos just a year into his contract. Shortly after his departure from Santos, he joined Fortaleza.

After failing to make an appearance at any level for Fortaleza, he joined Série B side Mirassol ahead of the 2023 season.

== Career statistics ==
=== Club ===
As of 30 January 2023.

Appearances and goals by club, season, and competition
Club	Season	League			State League		Cup		Other		Total	
Club	Season	Division	Apps	Goals	Apps	Goals	Apps	Goals	Apps	Goals	Apps	Goals
Mirassol	2023	Série B	0	0	0	0	0	0	0	0	0	0
Career total			0	0	0	0	0	0	0	0	0	0
