= Darko Anić (footballer) =

Serbian footballer

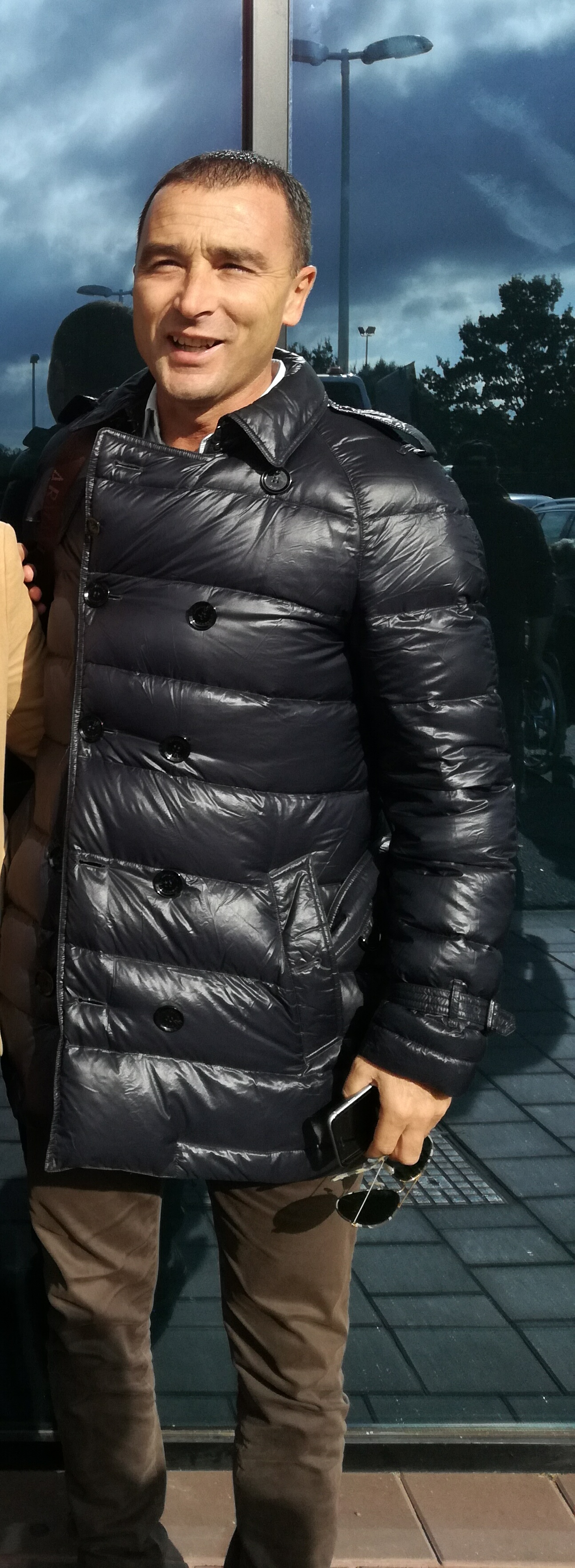

Personal information
- Full name: Darko Anić
- Date of birth: 5 March 1974 (age 52)
- Place of birth: Aranđelovac, SFR Yugoslavia
- Height: 1.79 m (5 ft 10 1/2 in)
- Position: Midfielder

Youth career
- Dinamo Pančevo

Senior career*
Years	Team	Apps	(Gls)
1993–1995	Borac Čačak	54	(12)
1995–1996	Vojvodina	29	(4)
1996–1997	Red Star Belgrade	18	(4)
1997–1999	Club Brugge	52	(10)
1999–2001	Siirt Jetpaspor	4	(0)
2001–2002	AA Gent	31	(2)
2003	LR Ahlen	12	(3)
2003–2004	Shandong Luneng	9	(0)
2004–2005	Remont Čačak		
2006	Nacional	6	(1)
2006	→ Rio Ave (loan)	5	(0)
2006–2007	Al-Ahli Jeddah		
- * Club domestic league appearances and goals

Darko Anić (Serbian Cyrillic: Дарко Анић; born 5 March 1974) is a Serbian retired footballer.

== Honours ==
Club Brugge

- Belgian Pro League: 1997–98
- Belgian Supercup: 1998

Shandong Luneng

- Chinese FA Cup: 2004
- Chinese Super League Cup: 2004

Al-Ahli Jeddah

- Crown Prince Cup: 2007
- Saudi Federation Cup: 2007
