= Wang Jun (footballer, born 1976) =

Chinese footballer

Wang Jun 王军
Personal information
- Full name: Wang Jun
- Date of birth: 24 June 1976 (age 50)
- Place of birth: Tianjin, China
- Height: 1.81 m (5 ft 11 in)
- Position: Midfielder

Youth career
- Tianjin team

Senior career*
Years	Team	Apps	(Gls)
1996–1997	Tianjin Vanke	?	(?)
1998–2007	Tianjin Teda	141	(3)
- * Club domestic league appearances and goals as of 1:19, 20 January 2010 (UTC) ‡ National team caps and goals as of 1:19, 20 January 2010 (UTC)

Wang Jun (simplified Chinese: 王军; traditional Chinese: 王軍; pinyin: Wáng Jūn; born on June 24, 1976) is a former soccer player who played for Tianjin Vanke from 1995 to 1997 and transferred to Tianjin Teda in 1998. He was one of three captains in Tianjin Teda since 2006. He retired from soccer on December 10, 2007, aged 31. After his retirement, he became an assistant coach for Tianjin Teda.

== Biography ==
Wang Jun began his professional football career with third-tier club Tianjin Vanke in the 1996 league season and saw them win promotion to the second tier. After only one season the club were relegated and the club decided to disband, allowing for Wang Jun to leave. He would stay within Tianjin to join recently relegated second-tier side Tianjin Teda and within his first season see the club win promotion to the top tier. The following season would see Wang Jun aid Tianjin Teda to mid-table safety and then build a relationship with the club that lasted for ten years that would eventually see Wang named as the team's captain until he retired at the end of the 2007 league season.

== Honours ==
Tianjin Teda

- Chinese Jia B League: 1998
