= Xu Yang (footballer, born 1979) =

Chinese footballer

Xu Yang 徐洋
Personal information
- Date of birth: 5 June 1979 (age 47)
- Place of birth: Shenyang, Liaoning, China
- Height: 1.85 m (6 ft 1 in)
- Positions: Defensive midfielder; defender

Youth career
- 1994–1998: Shenyang Haishi

Senior career*
Years	Team	Apps	(Gls)
1999–2007	Shenyang Haishi	103	(3)
2008–2010	Shanghai Shenhua	15	(0)
- * Club domestic league appearances and goals as of 6 January 2010 ‡ National team caps and goals as of 6 January 2010

Xu Yang (Chinese: 徐洋; pinyin: Xú Yáng) (born 5 June 1979 in Shenyang, Liaoning) is a former Chinese footballer who mainly played for Shenyang Haishi as a defender.

== Club career ==
=== Shenyang Haishi ===
Xu Yang started his football career playing for was his local youth team Shenyang Haishi and would graduate to their senior team in the 1999 league season to begin his professional football career. He would slowly establish himself as a squad regular until the 2001 league season when he played in 13 league games to establish himself within the squad. The following seasons would see him as a first choice regular able to play as a defensive midfielder or a centre-back and when the club moved away from Shenyang to Changsha as well as renaming themselves Changsha Ginde, he would join them.

=== Shanghai Shenhua ===
After eight seasons with his previous club Xu would transfer to top tier football club Shanghai Shenhua as a reliable replacement for existing centre-back Li Weifeng half-way through the 2008 league season. At the beginning of the 2009 league season the manager Jia Xiuquan would decide to make Du Wei and Yanko Valkanov as the preferred first choice centre back pair after they were chosen together in the club's debut game of the season against Singapore Armed Forces FC on 11 March 2009 in the 2009 AFC Champions League. As the season progressed Xu would only make a handful appearances before being dropped to the reserve team in the 2010 league season before leaving.
