= Tian Ye (footballer, born 1978) =

Chinese footballer

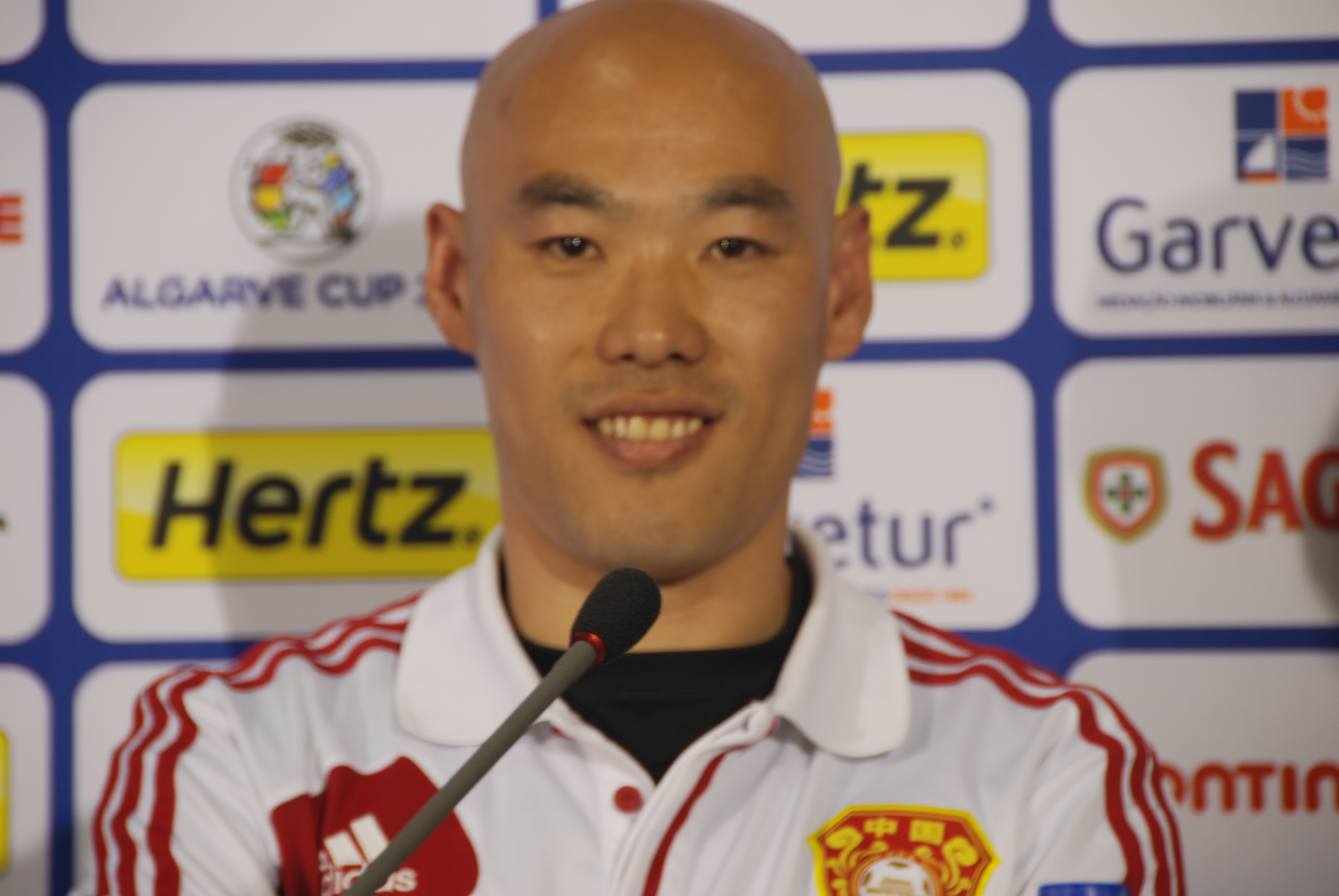

Personal information
- Full name: Ye Tian
- Date of birth: February 25, 1978 (age 48)
- Place of birth: Beijing, China
- Height: 1.88 m (6 ft 2 in)
- Position: Striker

Senior career*
Years	Team	Apps	(Gls)
1998–2003	Beijing Guoan		
2004-2005	Tianjin Teda		
2005-2006	Xiamen Blue Lions		
2006-2008	Changchun Yatai		

International career
1993-1997	China U20		

Managerial career
- 2009-2011: Changsha Ginde (assistant)
- 2011: Beijing Baxy (assistant)
- 2012-2014: China Women (assistant)
- 2015-2018: Changchun Yatai (assistant)
Medal record
Men's football
Representing China
East Asian Games
Bronze medal – third place	1997 Busan	Football
AFC Youth Championship
Silver medal – second place	1996 South Korea	Team
- * Club domestic league appearances and goals

Ye Tian (Chinese: 田野; born February 25, 1978) is a Chinese former professional football player, coach, and the founder of United Sports Football Club in the United States. Known for his role as a striker, particularly with Beijing Guoan, he later moved into coaching, including working as an assistant coach for the China women's national football team from 2012 to 2014.

== Playing career ==
=== China U20 (1993–1997) ===
Ye Tian began his football career as a youth player for the China U20 from 1993 to 1997. In 1996, he was part of the team that finished as runners-up in the Seoul Asian Youth Championships, which qualified the Chinese team for the 1997 FIFA World Youth Championship. His individual achievements during this time included becoming the top scorer at the Asian Youth Championships.

=== Beijing Guoan (1998–2003) ===
In 1998, Ye Tian transferred to Beijing Guoan after the merger of his previous team, Beijing Victory FC. During his time at the club, Beijing Guoan finished third in the Chinese Football League A and competed at the top levels of Chinese football.

=== Tianjin TEDA (2004–2005) ===
Ye moved to Tianjin Teda in 2004, continuing his playing career. The team achieved runner-up positions in the Chinese FA Cup in both 2000 and 2001.

=== Xiamen Blue Lion (2005–2006) ===
Tian then joined Xiamen Blue Lions, where he won the 2005 Chinese Super League championship.

=== Changchun Yatai (2006–2008) ===
Tian's final playing years were with Changchun Yatai His time with the club culminated in winning the 2007 Chinese Super League title, marking a high point in his professional playing career.

== Coaching career ==
=== Early coaching roles (2009–2011) ===
After retiring as a player, Ye Tian began his coaching career in 2009. His first coaching position was as an assistant coach with Changsha Ginde in the Chinese Super League. He later joined Beijing Baxy as an assistant coach in 2011.

=== China Women's National Football Team (2012–2014) ===
From 2012 to 2014, Ye Tian served as the assistant coach of the China women's national football team. The team finished third in the 2014 2014 AFC Women's Asian Cup and were runners-up in the East Asian Football Championship.

=== Changchun Yatai (2015–2018) ===
Ye returned to Changchun Yatai as an assistant coach from 2015 to 2018, where he worked alongside notable coaches such as Slaviša Stojanović and Lee Jang-soo.
