= Wang Chao (footballer) =

Chinese footballer

Wang Chao 王超
Personal information
- Date of birth: September 15, 1975 (age 49)
- Place of birth: Qingdao, China
- Height: 1.85 m (6 ft 1 in)
- Position(s): Defender

Senior career*
Years	Team	Apps	(Gls)
1995–2008	Shandong Luneng	182	(2)
- * Club domestic league appearances and goals

Wang Chao (Chinese: 王超 born September 15, 1975, in Qingdao) is a former Chinese football player who spent his whole career playing for Shandong Luneng.

== Club career ==
In the 1995 league season Wang Chao would begin his professional football career with Shandong Luneng after being promoted from their youth team. With them he would progress as their first choice left-back after several season. Once he started to establish himself as a permanent member of the Shandong he saw them establish themselves as a dominant force within the Chinese league system. After spending his entire professional career with Shandong and winning numerous league title's Wang Chao would retire by the end of the 2008 league season.

== Honours ==
- Chinese Jia-A League/Chinese Super League: 1999, 2006, 2008
- Chinese FA Cup: 1999, 2004, 2006
