= Xu Yang (footballer, born 1974) =

Chinese footballer

Xu Yang 徐阳
Personal information
- Full name: Xu Yang
- Date of birth: 6 June 1974 (age 52)
- Place of birth: Shenyang, Liaoning, China
- Height: 1.83 m (6 ft 0 in)
- Position: Midfielder

Youth career
- 1986–1993: Bayi Football Team

Senior career*
Years	Team	Apps	(Gls)
1994–1996	Bayi Football Team	26	(0)
1997–2000	Beijing Guoan	39	(5)
1999	Shenzhen Ping An (Loan)	4	(0)
2001–2002	Shandong Luneng Taishan	13	(0)
2003	Bayi Football Team	0	(0)
2004	Shandong Luneng Taishan	0	(0)
Total		82	(5)

International career^{‡}
2000	China	7	(0)
- * Club domestic league appearances and goals as of 2:02, 2 June 2009 (UTC) ‡ National team caps and goals as of 2:02, 2 June 2009 (UTC)

Xu Yang (simplified Chinese: 徐阳; traditional Chinese: 徐陽; pinyin: Xú Yáng; born 6 June 1974) was a former Chinese footballer who played as a midfielder. After his retirement as a player, he worked as a football coach for Beijing Baxy before he became a football pundit for CCTV sports channel.

== Biography ==
=== Club career ===
Following in the footsteps of his father Xu Yang would begin his football career when he joined the Bayi youth team at the age of twelve and showed a ruthless elegance within midfield. As a strong and increasingly confident young player he'll break into the senior team in 1994 and start out as a right-midfielder. While he stayed with the club for several further seasons and even helped the team finish third during the 1996 league season he felt that his playing time was limited and that it was better for him to develop somewhere else. On 20 December 1996 he asked for a transfer request and would transfer to Beijing Guoan at the beginning of the 1997 league season, however injury in his debut season saw his time limited. When Shen Xiangfu became Head coach of Beijing Xu Yang finally showed his potential as a creative midfielder and was quickly called up to the Chinese national team. At the beginning of the 2001 league season Xu Yang was at the peak of his career and he was expected to move to Chongqing Lifan before Shandong Luneng hijacked him for 3,500,000 Yuan. His move turned out to be a disappointment and Xu Yang tried to get a move away from the team with a return to Bayi Football Team being his preferred destination. Due to his attempts at a move away, Shandong held him to his contract and Xu Yang decided to retire from football before he turned thirty.

=== International career ===
Xu Yang made his international senior debut in a friendly against Yugoslavia on 25 March 2000 where he came on as a substitute for Li Weifeng in a 2-0 defeat. Despite this defeat the Chinese Head coach Bora Milutinović kept on playing him in several further friendlies in preparation for the 2000 AFC Asian Cup and would even include him in the squad that went to the tournament. During the competition Milutinović preferred Li Tie in midfield because of his better strength and defending and Xu only got a chance to play in one game throughout the competition against Korea Republic in the Third place play-off game where China lost 1-0.
