= Peter Vera =

Uruguayan footballer (born 1982)

Personal information
- Full name: Peter Javier Vera Díaz
- Date of birth: December 8, 1982 (age 43)
- Place of birth: Montevideo, Uruguay
- Position: Midfielder

Youth career
- Nacional

Senior career*
Years	Team	Apps	(Gls)
2001–2002	Nacional	5	(0)
2002	Bella Vista		(1)
2004	Shanghai Shenhua	13	(1)
2005	Deportivo Colonia	10	(1)
2005–2006	River Plate Montevideo	27	(2)
2007	Foolad FC	11	(0)
2007	Juventud Las Piedras		(0)
2008	Fernández Vial		(3)
2008	San Luis		(3)
2009–2010	Rampla Juniors	17	(1)

International career
1999	Uruguay U17	2	(0)
- * Club domestic league appearances and goals

Peter Javier Vera Díaz (born December 8, 1982) is a Uruguayan former professional footballer who played as a midfielder.

== Club career ==
Vera was born in Montevideo, Uruguay. A product of Nacional, he made five official appearances for them in 2002, winning the league title.

== International career ==
Vera has played for the Uruguay under-17 team at the 1999 FIFA U-17 World Championship.
