= Vladimir Matijašević =

Serbian footballer

Personal information
- Full name: Vladimir Matijašević
- Date of birth: 10 May 1978 (age 48)
- Place of birth: Čačak, SFR Yugoslavia
- Height: 1.78 m (5 ft 10 in)
- Position: Defender

Team information
- Current team: Čukarički (Sporting director)

Senior career*
Years	Team	Apps	(Gls)
1995–1997	Mladost Lučani	57	(0)
1998–1999	Vojvodina	21	(2)
1999–2000	AEK Athens	3	(0)
2000–2002	Red Star Belgrade	29	(0)
2002–2005	Železnik	40	(3)
2004	→ Shandong Luneng (loan)	20	(0)
2005–2006	Apollon Kalamarias	4	(0)
Total		174	(5)

International career
1998–1999	FR Yugoslavia U21	4	(0)
- * Club domestic league appearances and goals

Vladimir Matijašević (Serbian Cyrillic: Владимир Матијашевић, pronounced [ʋlǎdimiːr matijǎːʃeʋitɕ]; born 10 May 1978) is a Serbian former professional footballer who played as a defender.

== Club career ==
Matijašević started his football career in 1995 at Mladost Lučani. In 1998 he moved to Vojvodina, where he played for one season. On 5 August 1999 he was transferred to the Greek side, AEK Athens for a fee of 400 million drachmas, at the request of the manager Ljubiša Tumbaković. After a disaponting season in Greece Matijašević moved to Red Star Belgrade, where he played for two season. He then played for Železnik, Shandong Luneng and Apollon Kalamarias.

== After football ==
After retiring as a footballer Matijašević served as a sporting director at Napredak Kruševac in 2013. In the following season he moved to Čukarički, where he stayed for four seasons. On 2 July 2018 he returned to AEK Athens, but on 11 November he left the club. From 2021 he works at Čukarički.

== Statistics ==
Club	Season	League	
Club	Season	Apps	Goals
Red Star Belgrade	2000–01	9	0
Red Star Belgrade	2001–02	20	0
Železnik	2002–03	20	1
Železnik	2003–04	15	2
Železnik	2004–05	5	0

== Honours ==
Shandong Luneng

- Chinese FA Cup: 2004
