= Jorjão (footballer) =

Brazilian footballer

Personal information
- Full name: Jorge Alberto da Costa Silva
- Date of birth: 31 December 1970 (age 55)
- Place of birth: São José do Rio Preto, Brazil
- Height: 1.84 m (6 ft 0 in)
- Position: Central defender

Youth career
- 1988–1989: Coritiba

Senior career*
Years	Team	Apps	(Gls)
1990–1995	Coritiba	12	(0)
1991	→ Grêmio (loan)		
1994	→ Portuguesa (loan)	4	(0)
1996	Defensor Sporting		
1996	Veracruz		
1997	Deportes Tolima		
1998–2001	Nacional	93	(7)
2002–2003	Tianjin Teda	53	(6)
2004	Jandaia Esporte Clube		
2004	Wuhan Huanghelou		
- * Club domestic league appearances and goals

Jorge Alberto da Costa Silva (literally Big Jorge; born 31 December 1970), known as Jorjão or sometimes Jorgeao, is a former Brazilian footballer.

== Biography ==
Jorge started his professional career at Coritiba, and played for Coritiba at 1990, 1991 Copa do Brasil and 1993 Campeonato Brasileiro Série A. After Coritiba relegated, he spent next Campeonato Brasileiro season at Portuguesa. He then left for Ibero-America clubs and settled in Uruguay.

He played for 1997 Copa CONMEBOL for Deportes Tolima, 1999 Copa Libertadores and 2001 Copa Mercosur for Nacional. He played 46 league matches and scored 2 goals in 2000 and 2001 seasons. He played 144 official matches and scored 9 goals for Nacional in total.

In 2002, he left for China, and known as 曉曉 (Xiaoxiao) due to the pronunciation of his nickname Jorjão. In January 2003, his contract was extended.

He then returned to play for amateur side Jandaia Esporte Clube.

== Palmares ==
Titulos Locales
Titulos	Club	Pais	Año
Torneo Apertura	Nacional	Uruguay	1998
Torneo Clausura	Nacional	Uruguay	1998
Campeonato Uruguayo	Nacional	Uruguay	1998
Torneo Apertura	Nacional	Uruguay	1999
Liguilla	Nacional	Uruguay	1999
Torneo Apertura	Nacional	Uruguay	2000
Campeonato Uruguayo	Nacional	Uruguay	2000
Torneo Clausura	Nacional	Uruguay	2001
Campeonato Uruguayo	Nacional	Uruguay	2001
China League One	Whan Huanghelou	China	2004
