= Tai'an Sports Center Stadium =

Sports venue in Tai'an, China

- Interactive map of Tai'an Sports Center Stadium
- Location: Tai'an, China
- Coordinates: 36°12′16.45″N 117°3′47.92″E
- Capacity: 32,000

Construction
- Opened: November 1993

Tenants
- Tai'an Tiankuang (2023–present); U-16 Men's Football at the 2009 National Games of China

The Tai'an Sports Centre Stadium is an association football venue in Tai'an, China.

== Use ==
The center hosts football matches and hosted some matches for the U-16 Men's Football competition at the 2009 National Games of China. The stadium holds 32,000 spectators. This stadium plays an important part in fostering youth sports in Tai'an.
