= Jinzhou City Stadium =

Sports venue in Jinzhou, Liaoning, China

Coordinates: 41°6′48.61″N 121°9′9.95″E

Jinzhou City Stadium (Chinese: 锦州体育场) is a multi-use stadium in Jinzhou, Liaoning, China. It is currently used mostly for football matches and athletics events. The stadium has a capacity of 25,000 people.
