= Fuling Stadium =

Sports venue in Chongqing, China

Coordinates: 29°42′06″N 107°23′13″E

- Interactive map of Fuling Stadium
- Full name: Fuling Stadium
- Location: Chongqing, China
- Capacity: 22,000

The Fuling Stadium is a multi-purpose stadium in Chongqing, China. It is currently used mostly for football matches. The stadium holds 22,000 spectators.
