= Djima Oyawolé =

Togolese footballer

Personal information
- Full name: Djima Abiodun Oyawolé
- Date of birth: 18 October 1976 (age 50)
- Place of birth: Tsévié, Togo
- Height: 1.76 m (5 ft 9 in)
- Position: Striker

Senior career*
Years	Team	Apps	(Gls)
1995–2001	Metz	18	(0)
1997–1998	→ Lorient (loan)	29	(7)
1998–1999	→ Troyes (loan)	1	(0)
1999–2000	→ Louhans-Cuiseaux (loan)	6	(2)
2001–2003	Gent	43	(18)
2003–2005	Shenzhen Jianlibao	50	(14)
2006–2007	Gent	0	(0)
Total		147	(41)

International career
1995–2006	Togo	31	(7)
- * Club domestic league appearances and goals

Djima Abiodun Oyawolé (born 18 October 1976) is a Togolese former footballer who played as a striker. He played for the Togo national team between 1996 and 2006.

== Career ==
Born in Tsévié, Oyawolé played professionally in France, Belgium and China for Metz, Lorient, Troyes, Louhans-Cuiseaux, Gent and Shenzhen Jianlibao.

Oyawolé made his international debut for Togo in 1996, and appeared in five FIFA World Cup qualifying matches.

He acquired French nationality by naturalization on 16 February 1998.

== Honours ==
Shenzhen Jianlibao

- Chinese Super League: 2004
