= Zé Alcino =

Brazilian footballer

Personal information
- Full name: José Alcino Rosa
- Date of birth: 8 June 1974 (age 52)
- Place of birth: São Borja, Rio Grande do Sul, Brazil
- Height: 1.79 m (5 ft 10 in)
- Position: Forward

Senior career*
Years	Team	Apps	(Gls)
1993–1995	São Borja		
1995	→ Internacional (loan)	18	(1)
1996–1999	Grêmio	63	(15)
2000–2001	Nancy	45	(15)
2002–2005	Shanghai International		
2006	Brasil de Pelotas		
2006	São José		
2007	Esportivo		
2008	Novo Hamburgo		
2009	Avenida	0	(0)
Total		126	(31)
- * Club domestic league appearances and goals

José Alcino Rosa (born 8 June 1974), commonly known as Zé Alcino, is a Brazilian former footballer.

== Career statistics ==
=== Club ===
Appearances and goals by club, season and competition
Club	Season	League			State League		National Cup		League Cup		Continental		Other		Total	
Club	Season	Division	Apps	Goals	Apps	Goals	Apps	Goals	Apps	Goals	Apps	Goals	Apps	Goals	Apps	Goals
Internacional (loan)	1995	Série A	18	1	0	0	0	0	–		0	0	0	0	18	1
Grêmio	1996	Série A	19	4	0	0	2 (Note: Appearances in the Copa do Brasil)	0	–		2 (Note: One appearance in the Copa Libertadores, one appearance in the Copa de Oro)	0	0	0	23	4
Grêmio	1997	Série A	21	4	0	0	4	2	–		8 (Note: Appearances in the Copa Libertadores)	4	0	0	33	10
Grêmio	1998	Série A	15	3	0	0	0	0	–		6 (Note: Five appearances in the Copa Libertadores, one appearance in the Copa Mercosur)	0	0	0	21	3
Grêmio	1999	Série A	8	4	0	0	2	1	–		1 (Note: Appearances in the Copa Mercosur)	0	0	0	11	5
Grêmio	Total		63	15	0	0	8	3	0	0	17	4	0	0	88	22
Nancy	1999–00	Division 1	9	3	–		0	0	2 (Note: Appearances in the Coupe de la Ligue)	0	–		0	0	11	3
Nancy	2000–01	Division 2	23	9	–		1 (Note: Appearances in the Coupe de France)	0	2	1	–		0	0	26	10
Nancy	2001–02	Division 2	13	3	–		0	0	0	0	–		0	0	13	3
Nancy	Total		45	15	0	0	1	0	4	1	0	0	0	0	50	16
Avenida	2009	–			4 (Note: Appearances in the Campeonato Gaúcho)	1	0	0	–		0	0	0	0	4	1
Career total			126	31	4	1	9	3	4	1	17	4	0	0	160	40
