= Han Yanming =

Chinese footballer

Han Yanming 韩燕鸣
Personal information
- Date of birth: October 26, 1982 (age 44)
- Place of birth: Tianjin, China
- Height: 1.74 m (5 ft 9 in)
- Position: Midfielder

Youth career
- 1999 – 2000: Tianjin Teda

Senior career*
| Years | Team | Apps | (Gls) |
| 2001 – 2009 | Tianjin Teda | 115 | (15) |
| 2011 | Tianjin Teda | 6 | (1) |
| 2012 | Fujian Smart Hero | 18 | (3) |

International career^{‡}
| 2009 | China | 1 | (0) |
- * Club domestic league appearances and goals as of 1 Jan 2012 ‡ National team caps and goals as of 1 Jan 2012

Han Yanming (Chinese: 韩燕鸣; born October 26, 1982, in Tianjin) is a retired Chinese football player.

== Club career ==
Han Yanming began his professional footballer career during the 2001 league season after graduating from the various Tianjin Teda youth teams. With Tianjin he would gradually established himself as a useful attacking midfielder capable of scoring goals as a substitute, however it wasn't until the 2008 Chinese Super League season when he helped Tianjin qualify for AFC Champions League did he show his importance towards the team. His significance towards the team ended the following season when Tianjin were unable to improve upon their previous season's results and several first team regulars including Han were transfer listed. While South Korean side Incheon United F.C. showed an interest in his services Han suffered an injury before a transfer could take place. Once he recovered Han did not return to Tianjin and instead went to Henan to train on his fitness believing that he was free to leave after Tianjin stopped paying his wages.

After a whole year without playing football Han believed that he was a free agent and was widely expected to join top-tier side Henan Construction at the beginning of the 2011 league season. He would, however decide to return to Tianjin Teda instead where he claimed that he and the club had settled their differences. Tianjin Teda would also have to financially compensate Henan Construction for the time Han spent with them, which meant that Han was too late in registering his name for Tianjin Teda in allowing him to play in the 2011 AFC Champions League. After playing a handful of games for Tianjin Han was allowed to leave and would join recently promoted second-tier club Fujian Smart Hero at the beginning of the 2012 league season. However, he was released by the club on 16 September 2012 for disciplinary problems.

== International career ==
Han Yanming would make his international debut in a friendly against Jordan on December 12, 2009, when he came on as a substitute for Shao Jiayi in a 2–2 draw.
