= Shenzhen Stadium =

Sports stadium in Shenzhen, China

Coordinates: 22°33′43.83″N 114°5′13.16″E

Shenzhen Stadium 深圳体育场
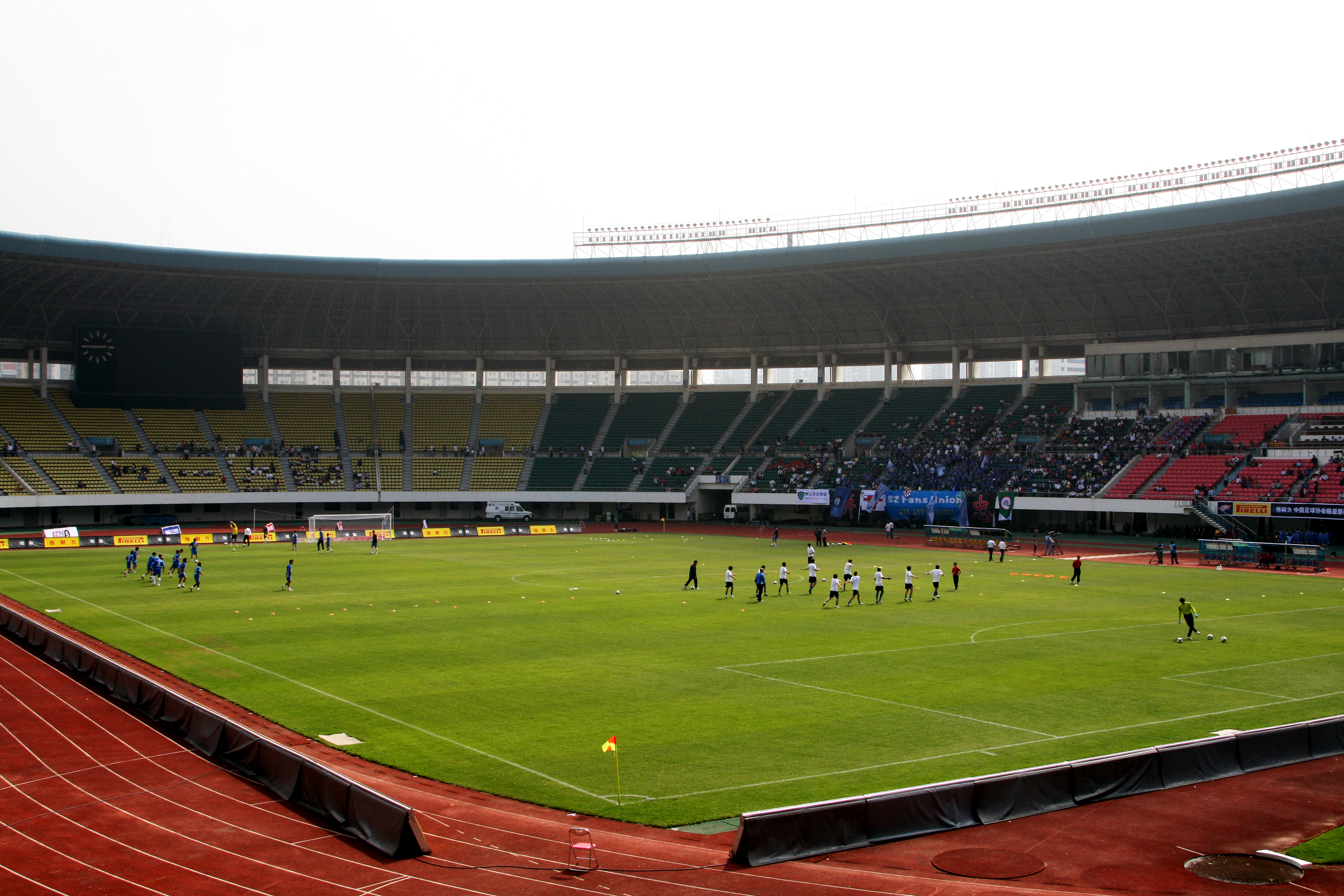
- Interactive map of Shenzhen Stadium 深圳体育场
- Location: Futian, Shenzhen, Guangdong, China
- Owner: Shenzhen Municipal People's Government
- Operator: Culture, Media, Tourism and Sports Bureau of Shenzhen Municipality
- Capacity: 32,500
- Surface: Grass
- Public transit: 67 at Bagualing; 714 at Huangmugang; 6 at Sports Center

Construction
- Opened: June 1993
- Closed: May 24, 2020; 6 years ago
- Demolished: May 24, 2020; 6 years ago
- Cost: 141 million RMB

Tenant
- Shenzhen (1994−2010, 2015−2018)

Shenzhen Stadium (simplified Chinese: 深圳体育场; traditional Chinese: 深圳體育場; pinyin: Shēnzhèn Tǐyùchǎng) was a multi-purpose stadium in Futian, Shenzhen, Guangdong, China. It had a seating capacity of 32,500 people and was the home of Shenzhen F.C..

It was built in June 1993, at a cost of 141 million RMB. It covered a total area of 24,892 square metres (267,940 sq ft).

== History and construction ==
Shenzhen Stadium was built in 1993 to accommodate the growing need for a major sports venue in Shenzhen, which was becoming one of China's fastest-developing cities. Its strategic location in the Futian District positions it near the city's central business areas, making it accessible for large-scale events. The stadium was part of a broader effort to enhance Shenzhen's status as a hub for sports and recreation following its rapid urban expansion in the 1980s and 1990s.

Reconstruction began in 2020 and ended in 2025 to modernize its facilities and increase seating capacity from 32,500 people to 45,000, with a rebrand to become the Shenzhen Sports Center Stadium.

== Architecture and design ==
The stadium boasted a seating capacity of approximately 32,500, designed to meet international standards for large sporting events. The architectural design included an open-air structure with modern facilities, providing clear sightlines for spectators and an expansive field suitable for various events. The stadium's design was representative of Shenzhen's modern and forward-thinking urban planning, combining functionality with aesthetic appeal.

== Sporting events ==
Shenzhen Stadium had been the home ground for various football teams, most notably the Shenzhen F.C., which competes in the Chinese Super League. Over the years, it had hosted several important football matches, including Chinese FA Cup games and international friendlies. The stadium had also been a venue for athletics events and occasionally other sports like rugby.

== Cultural and entertainment use ==
Beyond sports, Shenzhen Stadium was a frequent host for large-scale cultural events, including concerts and festivals. International music acts and performances had been staged here, contributing to its reputation as a multi-functional venue. Due to its central location and large capacity, it was often chosen for high-profile events in the city.
