= Chinese Super League Cup =

2004–2005 football tournament in China

- Founded: 2004
- Abolished: 2005
- Region: China
- Most championships: Shandong Luneng, Wuhan Huanghelou, (1 title)

The Chinese Super League Cup (Chinese: 中国足球协会超级联赛杯) was a football tournament in China held for two years from 2004 until 2005.

== History ==
Chinese Super League Cup was established in the inaugural season of the Chinese Super League (CSL) as a supplementary tournament while 12 inaugural CSL clubs lacked of matches. It was abolished in 2006 after CSL expanded to 15 clubs. The Chinese Football Association planned to reorganize the League Cup in 2013; however, the plan was rejected by most of the CSL clubs.

== Results ==
- 2004: Shandong Luneng 2:0 Shenzhen Jianlibao
- 2005: Wuhan Huanghelou 3:1 (agg.) Shenzhen Jianlibao
