= Annual awards of Chinese highest tier football league =

Since professionalism in 1994, annual performance awards for Chinese Jia-A League and Chinese Super League have been given to clubs, players, managers and referees after the season ended.

== Awards ==
=== League trophies ===
Year	Winners	Number of clubs
Chinese Jia-A League
1994	Dalian Wanda	12
1995	Shanghai Shenhua	12
1996	Dalian Wanda	12
1997	Dalian Wanda	12
1998	Dalian Wanda	14
1999	Shandong Luneng	14
2000	Dalian Shide	14
2001	Dalian Shide	14
2002	Dalian Shide	15
2003	~~Shanghai Shenhua~~^{1}	15
Chinese Super League
2004	Shenzhen Jianlibao	12
2005	Dalian Shide	14
2006	Shandong Luneng Taishan	15
2007	Changchun Yatai	15
2008	Shandong Luneng Taishan	16
2009	Beijing Guoan	16
2010	Shandong Luneng Taishan	16
2011	Guangzhou Evergrande	16
2012	Guangzhou Evergrande	16
2013	Guangzhou Evergrande	16
2014	Guangzhou Evergrande	16
2015	Guangzhou Evergrande Taobao	16
2016	Guangzhou Evergrande Taobao	16
2017	Guangzhou Evergrande Taobao	16
2018	Shanghai SIPG	16
2019	Guangzhou Evergrande Taobao	16
2020	Jiangsu Suning	16
2021	Shandong Taishan	16
2022	Wuhan Three Towns	18
2023	Shanghai Port	16
2024	Shanghai Port	16

^1 Shanghai Shenhua were stripped of the title on 19 February 2013 for the match-fixing scandal in this season.

=== Player of the Year ===
Year	Footballer	Age	Club
Chinese Jia-A League
1994	(China) Li Bing	25	Liaoning Yuandong
1995	(China) Fan Zhiyi	26	Shanghai Shenhua
1996	(China) Su Maozhen	24	Shandong Luneng
1997	(Paraguay) Jorge Luis Campos	27	Beijing Guoan
1998	(China) Hao Haidong	28	Dalian Wanda
1999	(China) Qu Shengqing	24	Liaoning FC
2000	(China) Zhang Enhua	27	Dalian Wanda
2001	(China) Li Tie	24	Liaoning FC
2002	(China) Zheng Zhi	22	Shenzhen Jianlibao
2003	(Germany) Jörg Albertz	32	Shanghai Shenhua
Chinese Super League
2004	(China) Zhao Junzhe	25	Liaoning Zhongyu
2005	(Serbia) Branko Jelić	28	Beijing Guoan
2006	(China) Zheng Zhi	26	Shandong Luneng Taishan
2007	(China) Du Zhenyu	26	Changchun Yatai
2008	(Honduras) Emil Martínez	26	Shanghai Shenhua
2009	(Honduras) Samuel Caballero	35	Changchun Yatai
2010	(Colombia) Duvier Riascos	24	Shanghai Shenhua
2011	(Brazil) Muriqui	25	Guangzhou Evergrande
2012	(Romania) Cristian Dănălache	30	Jiangsu Sainty
2013	(Argentina) Darío Conca	30	Guangzhou Evergrande
2014	(Brazil) Elkeson	25	Guangzhou Evergrande
2015	(Brazil) Ricardo Goulart	24	Guangzhou Evergrande Taobao
2016	(Brazil) Ricardo Goulart	25	Guangzhou Evergrande Taobao
2017	(Israel) Eran Zahavi	30	Guangzhou R&F
2018	(China) Wu Lei	27	Shanghai SIPG
2019	(Brazil) Paulinho	31	Guangzhou Evergrande Taobao
2023	(China) Wu Lei	32	Shanghai Port
2024	(China) Wu Lei	33	Shanghai Port

=== Golden Boot Award ===
Year	Top scorer	Age	Club	Goals
Chinese Jia-A League
1994	(China) Hu Zhijun	24	Guangzhou Apollo	17
1995	(China) Fan Zhiyi	26	Shanghai Shenhua	15
1996	(China) Su Maozhen	24	Shandong Luneng Taishan	13
1997	(China) Hao Haidong	27	Dalian Wanda	14
1998	(China) Hao Haidong	28	Dalian Wanda	18
1999	(China) Qu Shengqing	24	Liaoning Fushun	17
2000	(Paraguay) Casiano Delvalle	30	Shandong Luneng Taishan	15
2001	(China) Hao Haidong	31	Dalian Shide	16
2002	(China) Li Jinyu	25	Liaoning FC	15
2003	(Honduras) Saul Martínez (China) Li Yi (Ghana) Kwame Ayew	27; 24; 30	Shanghai Shenhua; Shenzhen Jianlibao; Changsha Ginde	14
Chinese Super League
2004	(Ghana) Kwame Ayew	31	Inter Shanghai	17
2005	(Serbia) Branko Jelić	28	Beijing Guoan	21
2006	(China) Li Jinyu	29	Shandong Luneng Taishan	26
2007	(China) Li Jinyu	30	Shandong Luneng Taishan	15
2008	(Brazil) Éber Luís	27	Tianjin Teda	14
2009	(Argentina) Hernán Barcos (Honduras) Luis Ramírez	25; 32	Shenzhen Asia Travel / Shanghai Shenhua; Guangzhou GPC	17
2010	(Colombia) Duvier Riascos	24	Shanghai Shenhua	20
2011	(Brazil) Muriqui	25	Guangzhou Evergrande	16
2012	(Romania) Cristian Dănălache	30	Jiangsu Sainty	23
2013	(Brazil) Elkeson	24	Guangzhou Evergrande	24
2014	(Brazil) Elkeson	25	Guangzhou Evergrande	28
2015	(Brazil) Aloísio	27	Shandong Luneng Taishan	22
2016	(Brazil) Ricardo Goulart	25	Guangzhou Evergrande Taobao	19
2017	(Israel) Eran Zahavi	30	Guangzhou R&F	27
2018	(China) Wu Lei	27	Shanghai SIPG	27
2019	(Israel) Eran Zahavi	32	Guangzhou R&F	29
2020	(Democratic Republic of the Congo) Cédric Bakambu	29	Beijing Guoan	14
2021	(Brazil) Júnior Negrão	35	Changchun Yatai	14
2022	(Brazil) Marcão	28	Wuhan Three Towns	27
2023	(Brazil) Leonardo	26	Changchun Yatai/Zhejiang Professional	19
2024	(China) Wu Lei	33	Shanghai Port	34

=== Top Chinese Goalscorer ===
Year	Top scorer	Age	Club	Goals
2011	(China) Yu Hanchao	24	Liaoning Whowin	12
2012	(China) Wang Yongpo	25	Shandong Luneng Taishan	10
2013	(China) Wu Lei	22	Shanghai East Asia	15
2014	(China) Wu Lei	23	Shanghai East Asia	12
2015	(China) Wu Lei	24	Shanghai SIPG	14
2016	(China) Wu Lei	25	Shanghai SIPG	14
2017	(China) Wu Lei	26	Shanghai SIPG	20
2018	(China) Wu Lei	27	Shanghai SIPG	27

=== Manager of the Year ===
Year	Manager	Age	Club	League standing
Chinese Jia-A League
1994	(China) Zhang Honggen	59	Dalian Wanda	Champion
1995	(China) Xu Genbao	51	Shanghai Shenhua	Champion
1996	(China) Chi Shangbin	47	Dalian Wanda	Champion
1997	(China) Chi Shangbin	48	Dalian Wanda	Champion
1998	(China) Xu Genbao	54	Dalian Wanda	Champion
1999	(Federal Republic of Yugoslavia) Slobodan Santrač	53	Shandong Luneng	Champion
2000	(South Korea) Lee Jang-soo	44	Chongqing Longxin	4th
2001	(Federal Republic of Yugoslavia) Milorad Kosanović	50	Dalian Shide	Champion
2002	(China) Zhu Guanghu	53	Shenzhen Ping'an	Runners-up
2003	(China) Wu Jingui	42	Shanghai Shenhua	Champion
Chinese Super League
2004	(China) Zhu Guanghu	55	Shenzhen Jianlibao	Champion
2005	(Serbia) Vladimir Petrović	60	Dalian Shide	Champion
2006	(Serbia) Ljubiša Tumbaković	54	Shandong Luneng Taishan	Champion
2007	(China) Gao Hongbo	41	Changchun Yatai	Champion
2008	(Serbia) Ljubiša Tumbaković	56	Shandong Luneng Taishan	Champion
2009	(China) Tang Yaodong	47	Henan Jianye	3rd
2010	(Serbia) Branko Ivanković	56	Shandong Luneng Taishan	Champion
2011	(China) Ma Lin	49	Liaoning Whowin	3rd
2012	(Serbia) Dragan Okuka	58	Jiangsu Sainty	Runners-up
2013	(Italy) Marcello Lippi	65	Guangzhou Evergrande	Champion
2014	(Spain) Gregorio Manzano	58	Beijing Guoan	Runners-up
2015	(Brazil) Luiz Felipe Scolari	67	Guangzhou Evergrande Taobao	Champion
2016	(Brazil) Luiz Felipe Scolari	68	Guangzhou Evergrande Taobao	Champion
2017	(Italy) Fabio Cannavaro	44	Guangzhou Evergrande Taobao	Champion
2018	(China) Li Xiaopeng	43	Shandong Luneng Taishan	3rd
2019	(China) Li Xiaopeng	44	Shandong Luneng Taishan	5th
2023	(South Korea) Choi Kang-hee	64	Shandong Luneng Taishan	Runners-up
2023	(Australia) Kevin Muscat	51	Shanghai Port	Champion

=== Youth Player of the Year ===
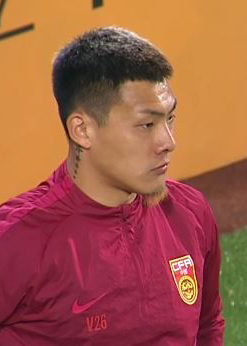
Wang Dalei is the youngest player that won the Youth Player of the Year, at the age of 17.

Year	Footballer	Age	Club
Chinese Jia-A League
1999	(China) Zhang Xiaorui	23	Tianjin TEDA
2000	(China) Qu Bo	19	Qingdao Etsong Hainiu
2001	(China) Zou Jie	20	Dalian Shide
2002	(China) Xu Liang	21	Liaoning Bird
2003	(China) Liu Jindong	21	Shandong Luneng Taishan
Chinese Super League
2004	(China) Chen Tao	19	Shenyang Ginde
2005	(China) Hao Junmin	18	Tianjin TEDA
2006	(China) Wang Dalei	17	Shanghai United
2007	(China) Hao Junmin	20	Tianjin TEDA
2008	(China) Huang Bowen	20	Beijing Guoan
2009	(China) Deng Zhuoxiang	21	Jiangsu Sainty
2010	(China) Zheng Zheng	21	Shandong Luneng Taishan
2011	(China) Song Wenjie	20	Qingdao Jonoon
2012	(China) Zhang Xizhe	21	Beijing Guoan
2013	(China) Jin Jingdao	21	Shandong Luneng Taishan
2014	(China) Liu Binbin	21	Shandong Luneng Taishan
2015	Vacancy		
2016	(China) Li Xiaoming	20	Henan Jianye
2017	(China) Hu Jinghang	20	Henan Jianye
2018	(China) Huang Zichang	21	Jiangsu Suning
2019	(China) Zhu Chenjie	19	Shanghai Greenland Shenhua
2023	(China) Shahsat Hujahmat	17	Shenzhen F.C.
2024	(China) Hu Hetao	21	Chengdu Rongcheng

=== U-23 Player of the Year ===
Year	Footballer	Age	Club
2017	(China) Huang Zhengyu	20	Guangzhou R&F

=== Goalkeeper of the Year ===
Year	Footballer	Age	Club
2012	(China) Deng Xiaofei	29	Jiangsu Sainty
2013	(China) Zeng Cheng	26	Guangzhou Evergrande
2014	(China) Wang Dalei	25	Shandong Luneng Taishan
2015	(China) Zeng Cheng	28	Guangzhou Evergrande Taobao
2016	(China) Zeng Cheng	29	Guangzhou Evergrande Taobao
2017	(China) Yan Junling	26	Shanghai SIPG
2018	(China) Yan Junling	27	Shanghai SIPG
2019	(China) Yan Junling	28	Shanghai SIPG
2023	(China) Wang Dalei	34	Shandong Taishan
2024	(China) Wang Dalei	35	Shandong Taishan

=== Golden Whistle of the Year ===
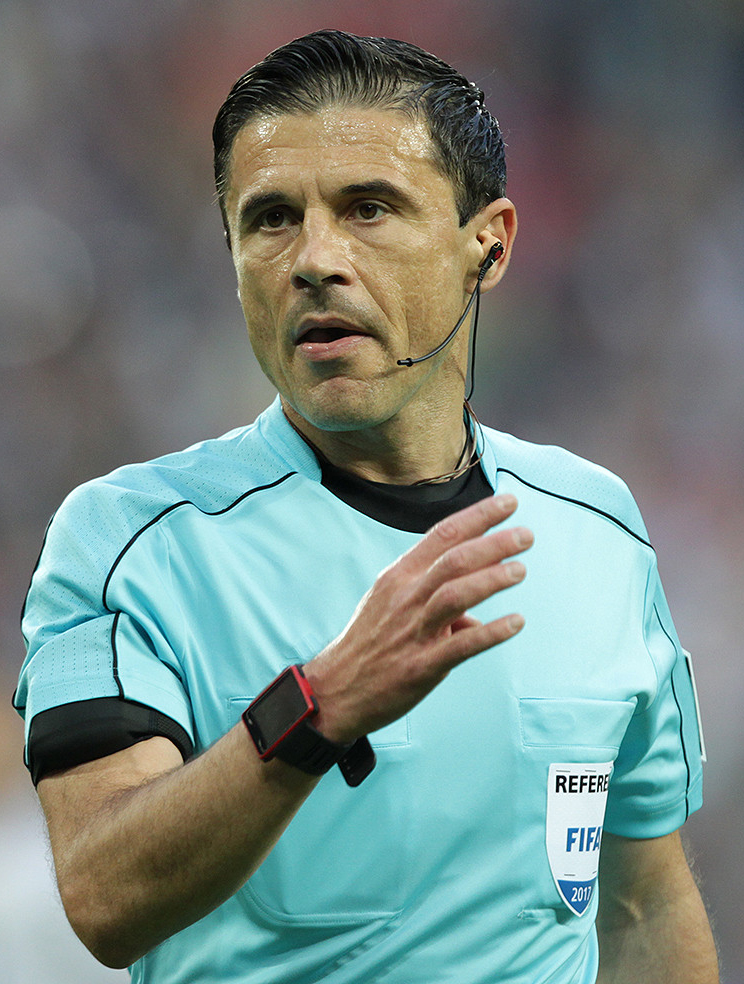
Milorad Mažić is the first foreign referee that won the Golden Whistle of the Year, for he was hired by Chinese Football Association as a professional referee in 2019.

Year	Referee	Age	Association
Chinese Jia-A League
1994	(China) Yu Jingyin	39	Dalian
1995	(China) Lu Jun	36	Beijing
1996	(China) Lu Jun	37	Beijing
1997	(China) Lu Jun	38	Beijing
1998	(China) Lu Jun	39	Beijing
1999	(China) Zhang Baohua	44	Tianjin
2000	(China) Lu Jun	41	Beijing
2001	(China) Sun Baojie	36	Beijing
2002	(China) Lu Jun	43	Beijing
2003	(China) Sun Baojie	38	Beijing
Chinese Super League
2004	(China) Sun Baojie	39	Beijing
2005	(China) Sun Baojie	40	Beijing
2006	(China) Sun Baojie	41	Beijing
2007	(China) Sun Baojie	42	Beijing
2008	(China) Sun Baojie	43	Beijing
2009	(China) Sun Baojie	44	Beijing
2010	(China) Sun Baojie	45	Beijing
2011	(China) Tan Hai	41	BSU
2012	(China) Tan Hai	42	BSU
2013	(China) Li Jun	42	Jiangsu
2014	(China) Tan Hai	44	BSU
2015	(China) Tan Hai	45	BSU
2016	(China) Ma Ning	37	Jiangsu
2017	(China) Ma Ning	38	Jiangsu
2018	(China) Zhang Lei	36	Dalian
2019	(Serbia) Milorad Mažić	46	
2023	(China) Ma Ning	44	Jiangsu
2024	(China) Tang Shunqi	36	Chengdu

=== Golden Flag of the Year ===
Year	Assistant referee	Age	Association
Chinese Jia-A League
2011	(China) Alamusi	40	Guangzhou
2012	(China) Su Jige	45	Beijing
2013	(China) Huo Weiming	43	Beijing
2014	(China) Mu Yuxin	44	Tianjin
2015	(China) Alamusi	44	Guangzhou
2016	(China) Alamusi	45	Guangzhou
2017	(China) Huo Weiming	44	Beijing
2018	(China) Huo Weiming	45	Beijing
2019	(China) Zhang Cheng	32	Shanghai
