= Feng Xiaoting =

Chinese footballer (born 1985)

Feng Xiaoting 冯潇霆
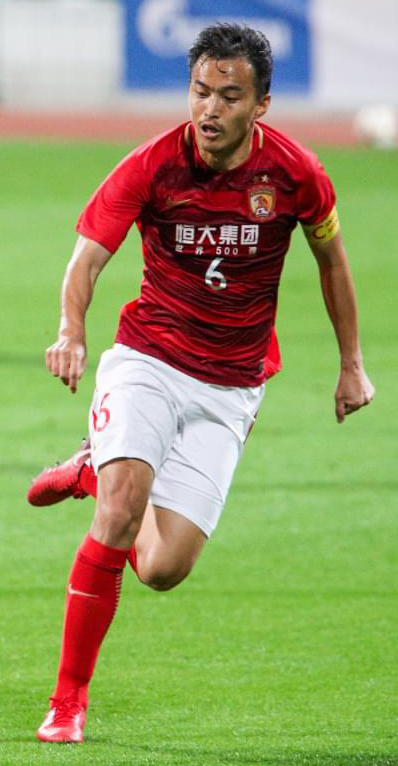
- Feng with Guangzhou Evergrande in 2018

Personal information
- Full name: Feng Xiaoting
- Date of birth: 22 October 1985 (age 41)
- Place of birth: Dalian, Liaoning, China
- Height: 1.86 m (6 ft 1 in)
- Position: Centre-back

Senior career*
| Years | Team | Apps | (Gls) |
| 2003–2004 | Sichuan Guancheng | 35 | (2) |
| 2005–2008 | Dalian Shide | 35 | (0) |
| 2009 | Daegu FC | 19 | (0) |
| 2010 | Jeonbuk Hyundai Motors | 11 | (0) |
| 2011–2020 | Guangzhou Evergrande | 209 | (5) |
| 2020 | → Shanghai Shenhua (loan) | 13 | (0) |
| 2021–2022 | Shanghai Shenhua | 20 | (0) |
| 2023 | Dongguan United | 12 | (1) |
| Total | | 354 | (8) |

International career^{‡}
| 2003–2005 | China U20 | | |
| 2005–2008 | China U23 | | |
| 2004–2019 | China | 76 | (1) |
Medal record
Representing China
Men's football
EAFF Championship
| Gold medal – first place | 2005 South Korea | Team |
| Bronze medal – third place | 2008 China | Team |
| Gold medal – first place | 2010 Japan | Team |
| Silver medal – second place | 2015 China | Team |
East Asian Games
| Gold medal – first place | 2001 Macau | Football |
AFC Youth Championship
| Silver medal – second place | 2004 َ Malaysia | Team |
- * Club domestic league appearances and goals as of 4 November 2023 ‡ National team caps and goals as of 18 October 2019

Feng Xiaoting
- Simplified Chinese: 冯潇霆
- Traditional Chinese: 馮瀟霆
Transcriptions
Standard Mandarin
- Hanyu Pinyin: Féng Xiāotíng
- IPA: [fə̌ŋ ɕjáʊ tʰǐŋ]

Feng Xiaoting (Chinese: 冯潇霆; pinyin: Féng Xiāotíng; born 22 October 1985) is a Chinese former professional footballer who played as a centre-back.

== Club career ==
Feng Xiaoting started his football career with Sichuan Guancheng in the 2003 league season where he quickly established himself as a regular. Despite being only 17 years old, he captained them for several games, making him the youngest club captain in professional Chinese football. In December 2003, Feng had a brief trial with Ligue 1 side FC Nantes but failed to join the club. His second season was considerably less productive after he suffered a serious injury and subsequently missed most of the 2004 league season.

As a promising youngster with top tier experience, Feng quickly drew the attentions of top tier side Dalian Shide and transferred to them in the 2005 league season even though he was still injured and missed much of the early stages of the season. Nevertheless, during the latter half of the season, he started to play a vital part in Dalian's push for the league and cup double, where he saw them win both. The following seasons though saw Feng play a smaller role within the club and it was only once then manager Ji Mingyi left before he started to establish himself as an integral member of the squad during the 2008 season.

Feng came close to signing with Serie A side A.C. Siena during the summer of 2008. Their sporting director Manuel Gerolin watched all of Chinese under-23 national team's matches during the 2008 Summer Olympics matches and was impressed by Feng, but problems with the player's registration delayed this possibility. With his contract about to end with Dalian, Feng received offers from K-League sides Chunnam Dragons, Jeju United and Daegu FC before the 2009 season. He eventually signed a two-year contract with Daegu FC on a free transfer. Feng made his debut for the club on 22 March 2009 in a 2–2 draw against Pohang Steelers. On 29 January 2010, Feng signed for K-League champions Jeonbuk Hyundai Motors on a free transfer. Feng did not have a starting role in the backline for Jeonbuk that season and was soon released by the club.

Feng decided to sign for Chinese Super League side Guangzhou Evergrande right before the start of the 2011 season. That year, with a tight defense only conceding 23 goals the entire season, saw Guangzhou win their first ever top tier title. In the 2012 season, Feng helped the club to a domestic double, winning both the top tier title and the Chinese FA Cup. The following campaign he would be an integral member of the team that not only won the league title, but also gained continental success by winning the 2013 AFC Champions League. More continued success would follow with another continental title with the 2015 AFC Champions League.

On 3 February 2020, Feng was loaned out to fellow top tier club Shanghai Shenhua for the 2020 Chinese Super League campaign. He would make his debut in a league game on 30 July 2020 against Shenzhen in a 3-2 victory. He would go on to make his move to Shenhua permanent the following season where he would be a squad player for two seasons until his contract expired and he left the team on 1 February 2023.

On 28 December 2024, Feng held the retirement game with his former teammates Li Xuepeng and Rong Hao in Shandong Linyi Olympic Park.

== International career ==
Feng was first called up to the Chinese national team by then manager Arie Haan who gave him his debut in a 2–0 win against Myanmar on 17 March 2004. The following manager Zhu Guanghu decided that Feng was too inexperienced for the senior team and Feng was instead part of the Chinese under-23 national team that played in the 2008 Summer Olympics where he was the first-choice centre back and was paired with Li Weifeng as China were knocked out in the group stage. After the tournament, Feng was promoted back to the national team once again when then manager Vladimir Petrović included him during 2010 FIFA World Cup qualification. He soon became a regular for the national team and went on to win the 2010 East Asian Football Championship. On 20 November 2018, Feng scored his first international goal in a 1–1 draw against Palestine.

== Personal life ==
Feng married Zhao Yingying, who works for China's national television network CCTV, on 16 February 2009.

== Career statistics ==
=== Club statistics ===
As of 4 November 2023

Appearances and goals by club, season and competition
| Club | Season | League | | | National Cup | | League Cup | | Continental | | Other | | Total | |
| Club | Season | Division | Apps | Goals | Apps | Goals | Apps | Goals | Apps | Goals | Apps | Goals | Apps | Goals |
|---|---|---|---|---|---|---|---|---|---|---|---|---|---|---|
| Sichuan Guancheng | 2003 | Chinese Jia-A League | 25 | 2 | 2 | 0 | - | | - | | - | | 27 | 2 |
| Sichuan Guancheng | 2004 | Chinese Super League | 10 | 0 | 6 | 0 | 2 | 0 | - | | - | | 18 | 0 |
| Sichuan Guancheng | Total | | 35 | 2 | 8 | 0 | 2 | 0 | 0 | 0 | 0 | 0 | 45 | 2 |
| Dalian Shide | 2005 | Chinese Super League | 6 | 0 | 2 | 0 | 0 | 0 | - | | - | | 8 | 0 |
| Dalian Shide | 2006 | Chinese Super League | 4 | 0 | 2 | 0 | - | | 6 | 0 | 0 (Note: Appearance in A3 Champions Cup) | 0 | 12 | 0 |
| Dalian Shide | 2007 | Chinese Super League | 4 | 0 | - | | - | | - | | - | | 4 | 0 |
| Dalian Shide | 2008 | Chinese Super League | 21 | 0 | - | | - | | - | | - | | 21 | 0 |
| Dalian Shide | Total | | 35 | 0 | 4 | 0 | 0 | 0 | 6 | 0 | 0 | 0 | 45 | 0 |
| Daegu FC | 2009 | K-League | 19 | 0 | 2 | 0 | 1 | 0 | - | | - | | 22 | 0 |
| Jeonbuk Hyundai Motors | 2010 | K-League | 11 | 0 | 1 | 0 | 1 | 0 | 7 | 0 | - | | 20 | 0 |
| Guangzhou Evergrande | 2011 | Chinese Super League | 27 | 2 | 1 | 0 | - | | - | | - | | 28 | 2 |
| Guangzhou Evergrande | 2012 | Chinese Super League | 19 | 0 | 3 | 0 | - | | 9 | 0 | 1 (Note: Appearances in Chinese FA Super Cup) | 0 | 32 | 0 |
| Guangzhou Evergrande | 2013 | Chinese Super League | 25 | 0 | 4 | 0 | - | | 13 | 1 | 4 (Note: One appearance in Chinese FA Super Cup, Three appearances in FIFA Club World Cup) | 0 | 46 | 1 |
| Guangzhou Evergrande | 2014 | Chinese Super League | 23 | 0 | 0 | 0 | - | | 9 | 0 | 0 | 0 | 32 | 0 |
| Guangzhou Evergrande | 2015 | Chinese Super League | 27 | 1 | 0 | 0 | - | | 13 | 0 | 3 (Note: One appearance in Chinese FA Super Cup, Two appearances in FIFA Club World Cup) | 0 | 43 | 1 |
| Guangzhou Evergrande | 2016 | Chinese Super League | 22 | 0 | 5 | 0 | - | | 5 | 0 | 1 | 0 | 33 | 0 |
| Guangzhou Evergrande | 2017 | Chinese Super League | 24 | 1 | 2 | 0 | - | | 10 | 0 | 1 | 0 | 37 | 1 |
| Guangzhou Evergrande | 2018 | Chinese Super League | 26 | 0 | 0 | 0 | - | | 7 | 0 | 1 | 0 | 34 | 0 |
| Guangzhou Evergrande | 2019 | Chinese Super League | 16 | 1 | 0 | 0 | - | | 4 | 0 | - | | 20 | 1 |
| Guangzhou Evergrande | Total | | 209 | 5 | 15 | 0 | 0 | 0 | 70 | 1 | 11 | 0 | 305 | 6 |
| Shanghai Shenhua (loan) | 2020 | Chinese Super League | 13 | 0 | 0 | 0 | - | | 6 | 0 | - | | 19 | 0 |
| Shanghai Shenhua | 2021 | Chinese Super League | 12 | 0 | 6 | 0 | - | | - | | - | | 18 | 0 |
| Shanghai Shenhua | 2022 | Chinese Super League | 8 | 0 | 0 | 0 | - | | - | | - | | 8 | 0 |
| Shanghai Shenhua | Total | | 20 | 0 | 6 | 0 | 0 | 0 | 0 | 0 | 0 | 0 | 26 | 0 |
| Dongguan United | 2023 | China League One | 12 | 1 | 0 | 0 | - | | - | | - | | 12 | 1 |
| Career total | | | 354 | 8 | 36 | 0 | 4 | 0 | 89 | 1 | 11 | 0 | 494 | 9 |

=== International statistics ===
National team
| Year | Apps | Goals |
|---|---|---|
| 2004 | 2 | 0 |
| 2005 | 0 | 0 |
| 2006 | 0 | 0 |
| 2007 | 0 | 0 |
| 2008 | 5 | 0 |
| 2009 | 6 | 0 |
| 2010 | 8 | 0 |
| 2011 | 5 | 0 |
| 2012 | 4 | 0 |
| 2013 | 7 | 0 |
| 2014 | 6 | 0 |
| 2015 | 5 | 0 |
| 2016 | 9 | 0 |
| 2017 | 7 | 0 |
| 2018 | 7 | 1 |
| 2019 | 5 | 0 |
| Total | 76 | 1 |

=== International goals ===
As of 20 November 2018
Scores and results list China's goal tally first.

| No | Date | Venue | Opponent | Score | Result | Competition |
|---|---|---|---|---|---|---|
| 1. | 20 November 2018 | Wuyuan River Stadium, Haikou, China | Palestine | 1–0 | 1–1 | Friendly |

== Honours ==
=== Club ===
Dalian Shide

- Chinese Super League: 2005
- Chinese FA Cup: 2005

Guangzhou Evergrande

- Chinese Super League: 2011, 2012, 2013, 2014, 2015, 2016, 2017, 2019
- AFC Champions League: 2013, 2015
- Chinese FA Cup: 2012, 2016
- Chinese FA Super Cup: 2012, 2016, 2017, 2018

=== International ===
China PR national football team

- East Asian Football Championship: 2005, 2010

=== Individual ===
- Chinese Super League Team of the Year: 2015, 2016, 2017, 2018
- Chinese Footballer of the Year: 2017
