= 2005 East Asian Football Championship Final squads =

Below are the squads for the 2005 East Asian Football Championship tournament in South Korea. There were 23 players in each squad, including 3 goalkeepers.

== China ==
Coach: (China) Zhu Guanghu

| No. | Pos. | Player | Date of birth (age) | Caps | Club |
|---|---|---|---|---|---|
| 1 | GK | Liu Yunfei | 8 May 1979 (aged 26) | | (China) Tianjin Taida |
| 2 | DF | Feng Xiaoting | 22 October 1985 (aged 19) | | (China) Dalian Shide |
| 3 | FW | Hao Junmin | 24 March 1987 (aged 18) | | (China) Tianjin Taida |
| 4 | DF | Zhang Yaokun | 17 April 1981 (aged 24) | | (China) Sichuan Guancheng |
| 5 | DF | Li Weifeng (captain) | 1 December 1978 (aged 26) | | (China) Shenzhen Jianlibao |
| 6 | MF | Zhou Haibin | 19 July 1985 (aged 20) | | (China) Shandong Luneng |
| 7 | MF | Zhao Xuri | 3 December 1985 (aged 19) | | (China) Dalian Shide |
| 8 | FW | Zheng Bin | 4 July 1977 (aged 28) | | (China) Wuhan Huanghelou |
| 10 | FW | Chen Tao | 11 March 1985 (aged 20) | | (China) Shenyang Ginde |
| 11 | DF | Cao Yang | 15 December 1981 (aged 23) | | (China) Tianjin Teda |
| 13 | MF | Xu Yunlong | 17 February 1979 (aged 26) | | (China) Beijing Hyundai |
| 16 | DF | Ji Mingyi | 15 December 1980 (aged 24) | | (China) Dalian Shide |
| 17 | FW | Zou Jie | 17 January 1981 (aged 24) | | (China) Dalian Shide |
| 18 | FW | Gao Lin | 14 February 1986 (aged 19) | | (China) Shanghai Shenhua |
| 19 | DF | Jiao Zhe | 21 August 1981 (aged 23) | | (China) Shandong Luneng |
| 20 | MF | Wang Liang | 19 July 1979 (aged 26) | | (China) Liaoning Zhongyu |
| 21 | DF | Zhang Yonghai | 15 March 1979 (aged 26) | | (China) Shenzhen Jianlibao |
| 22 | GK | Li Leilei | 30 June 1977 (aged 28) | | (China) Shenzhen Jianlibao |
| 23 | GK | Li Jian | 9 December 1977 (aged 27) | | (China) Chongqing Qiche |
| 25 | DF | Xie Hui | 14 February 1975 (aged 30) | | (China) Shanghai Shenhua |
| 27 | DF | Sun Xiang | 15 January 1982 (aged 23) | | (China) Shanghai Shenhua |
| 28 | MF | Li Yan | 20 June 1980 (aged 25) | | (China) Inter Shanghai |
| 29 | FW | Li Jinyu | 15 March 1979 (aged 26) | | (China) Shandong Luneng |

== Japan ==
Coach: (Brazil) Zico

| No. | Pos. | Player | Date of birth (age) | Caps | Club |
|---|---|---|---|---|---|
| 1 | GK | Seigo Narazaki | 15 April 1976 (aged 29) | | (Japan) Nagoya Grampus Eight |
| 2 | DF | Makoto Tanaka | 8 August 1975 (aged 29) | | (Japan) Jubilo Iwata |
| 3 | DF | Takayuki Chano | 23 November 1976 (aged 28) | | (Japan) Jubilo Iwata |
| 4 | MF | Yasuhito Endo | 28 January 1980 (aged 25) | | (Japan) Gamba Osaka |
| 5 | DF | Tsuneyasu Miyamoto (captain) | 7 February 1977 (aged 28) | | (Japan) Gamba Osaka |
| 8 | MF | Mitsuo Ogasawara | 5 April 1979 (aged 26) | | (Japan) Kashima Antlers |
| 9 | MF | Seiichiro Maki | 8 August 1980 (aged 24) | | (Japan) JEF United Chiba |
| 12 | GK | Yoichi Doi | 25 July 1973 (aged 32) | | (Japan) FC Tokyo |
| 14 | DF | Alex | 20 July 1977 (aged 28) | | (Japan) Urawa Red Diamonds |
| 15 | MF | Takashi Fukunishi | 1 September 1976 (aged 28) | | (Japan) Jubilo Iwata |
| 16 | MF | Masashi Oguro | 4 May 1980 (aged 25) | | (Japan) Gamba Osaka |
| 17 | DF | Yuichi Komano | 25 July 1981 (aged 24) | | (Japan) Sanfrecce Hiroshima |
| 19 | MF | Masashi Motoyama | 20 June 1979 (aged 26) | | (Japan) Kashima Antlers |
| 20 | DF | Keisuke Tsuboi | 16 September 1979 (aged 25) | | (Japan) Sanfrecce Hiroshima |
| 21 | DF | Akira Kaji | 13 January 1980 (aged 25) | | (Japan) FC Tokyo |
| 22 | DF | Yuji Nakazawa | 25 February 1978 (aged 27) | | (Japan) Yokohama F. Marinos |
| 23 | GK | Yoshikatsu Kawaguchi | 15 August 1975 (aged 29) | | (Japan) Jubilo Iwata |
| 25 | MF | Shinji Murai | 1 December 1979 (aged 25) | | (Japan) Jubilo Iwata |
| 26 | MF | Yasuyuki Konno | 25 January 1983 (aged 22) | | (Japan) FC Tokyo |
| 27 | MF | Tatsuya Tanaka | 27 November 1982 (aged 22) | | (Japan) Urawa Red Diamonds |
| 28 | MF | Keiji Tamada | 11 April 1980 (aged 25) | | (Japan) Kashiwa Reysol |
| 29 | DF | Teruyuki Moniwa | 8 September 1981 (aged 23) | | (Japan) FC Tokyo |
| 30 | MF | Yuki Abe | 6 September 1981 (aged 23) | | (Japan) JEF United Chiba |

== North Korea ==
Coach: (North Korea) Kim Myong-Song

| No. | Pos. | Player | Date of birth (age) | Caps | Club |
|---|---|---|---|---|---|
| 1 | GK | Ri Myong-Dok | 1 February 1984 (aged 21) | | (North Korea) Pyongyang City |
| 2 | DF | Cha Jong-Hyok | 25 September 1985 (aged 19) | | (North Korea) Amrokgang |
| 3 | DF | Hwang Myong-Chol | 17 September 1982 (aged 22) | | Unattached |
| 5 | DF | So Hyok-Chol | 19 February 1982 (aged 23) | | (North Korea) Pyongyang City |
| 7 | MF | Kim Chol-Ho | 15 October 1985 (aged 19) | | (North Korea) Amrokgang |
| 8 | MF | Ri Han-Jae | 27 June 1982 (aged 23) | | (Japan) Sanfrecce Hiroshima |
| 9 | FW | Kim Myong-Chol | 11 January 1985 (aged 20) | | (North Korea) Amrokgang |
| 10 | MF | An Jong-Ho | 11 March 1987 (aged 18) | | (North Korea) Amrokgang |
| 11 | DF | Han Sun-Il | 18 January 1985 (aged 20) | | (North Korea) Pyongyang City |
| 12 | MF | Ri Yong-Gwang | 15 August 1981 (aged 23) | | (North Korea) Pyongyang City |
| 14 | DF | Han Song-Chol | 10 July 1977 (aged 28) | | (North Korea) April 25 |
| 15 | MF | Kim Yong-Jun (captain) | 19 July 1983 (aged 22) | | (North Korea) Pyongyang City |
| 16 | MF | Nam Song-Chol | 7 May 1982 (aged 23) | | (North Korea) April 25 |
| 17 | MF | Ahn Young-Hak | 25 October 1978 (aged 26) | | (Japan) Nagoya Grampus |
| 18 | MF | Kim Song-Chol | 29 August 1983 (aged 21) | | (North Korea) Kigwancha |
| 19 | FW | Choe Ung-Chon | 15 May 1982 (aged 23) | | Unattached |
| 20 | DF | Pak Chol-Jin | 5 September 1985 (aged 19) | | (North Korea) Amrokgang |
| 21 | MF | Ryang Yong-Gi | 7 January 1982 (aged 23) | | (Japan) Vegalta Sendai |
| 22 | FW | An Chol-Hyok | 27 June 1985 (aged 20) | | (North Korea) Rimyongsu |
| 23 | GK | Kim Myong-Gil | 16 October 1984 (aged 20) | | (North Korea) Amrokgang |
| 25 | FW | Pak Song-Gwan | 14 August 1980 (aged 24) | | (North Korea) Rimyongsu |
| 28 | DF | Ri Kwang-Hyok | 17 April 1987 (aged 18) | | (North Korea) Kyonggongop |
| 31 | GK | Ri Myong-Guk | 9 September 1986 (aged 18) | | (North Korea) Pyongyang City |

== South Korea ==
Coach: (Netherlands) Jo Bonfrere

| No. | Pos. | Player | Date of birth (age) | Caps | Club |
|---|---|---|---|---|---|
| 1 | GK | Lee Woon-jae (captain) | 26 April 1973 (aged 32) | | (South Korea) Suwon Samsung Bluewings |
| 2 | DF | Yoo Kyoung-youl | 15 August 1978 (aged 26) | | (South Korea) Ulsan Hyundai Horang-i |
| 3 | DF | Kim Han-yoon | 11 July 1974 (aged 31) | | (South Korea) Bucheon SK |
| 4 | DF | Kim Jin-kyu | 16 February 1985 (aged 20) | | (Japan) Jubilo Iwata |
| 5 | DF | Kim Young-chul | 30 June 1976 (aged 29) | | (South Korea) Seongnam Ilhwa Chunma |
| 8 | MF | Kim Do-heon | 14 July 1982 (aged 23) | | (South Korea) Seongnam Ilhwa Chunma |
| 9 | FW | Lee Chun-soo | 9 July 1981 (aged 24) | | (South Korea) Ulsan Hyundai Horang-i |
| 10 | FW | Park Chu-young | 10 July 1985 (aged 20) | | (South Korea) FC Seoul |
| 11 | MF | Choi Tae-uk | 13 March 1981 (aged 24) | | (Japan) Shimizu S-Pulse |
| 12 | MF | Baek Ji-hoon | 28 February 1985 (aged 20) | | (South Korea) FC Seoul |
| 13 | MF | Kim Dong-jin | 29 January 1982 (aged 23) | | (South Korea) FC Seoul |
| 14 | DF | Kim Sang-sik | 17 December 1976 (aged 28) | | (South Korea) Seongnam Ilhwa Chunma |
| 15 | MF | Kim Jung-woo | 9 May 1982 (aged 23) | | (South Korea) Ulsan Hyundai Horang-i |
| 16 | FW | Chung Kyung-ho | 22 May 1980 (aged 25) | | (South Korea) Gwangju Sangmu Bulsajo |
| 17 | MF | Oh Beom-seok | 29 July 1984 (aged 21) | | (South Korea) Pohang Steelers |
| 18 | FW | Kim Jin-yong | 9 October 1982 (aged 22) | | (South Korea) Ulsan Hyundai Horang-i |
| 19 | MF | Hong Soon-hak | 19 September 1980 (aged 24) | | (South Korea) Daegu FC |
| 20 | FW | Lee Dong-gook | 29 April 1979 (aged 26) | | (South Korea) Pohang Steelers |
| 21 | MF | Yang Sang-min | 24 February 1984 (aged 21) | | (South Korea) Chunnam Dragons |
| 22 | MF | Park Kyu-seon | 24 September 1981 (aged 23) | | (South Korea) Chonbuk Hyundai Motors |
| 23 | GK | Kim Yong-dae | 11 October 1979 (aged 25) | | (South Korea) Busan I'Park |
| 29 | DF | Kwak Hee-ju | 5 October 1981 (aged 23) | | (South Korea) Suwon Samsung Bluewings |
| 31 | GK | Kim Young-kwang | 28 June 1983 (aged 22) | | (South Korea) Chunnam Dragons |
