= Li Jian (footballer, born 1977) =

Chinese footballer

Li Jian 李健
Personal information
- Date of birth: 9 December 1977 (age 48)
- Place of birth: Tianjin, China
- Height: 1.85 m (6 ft 1 in)
- Position: Goalkeeper

Youth career
- 1989–1993: Bayi Football Team
- 1993–1998: Shenzhen Youth

Senior career*
Years	Team	Apps	(Gls)
1999–2002	Bayi Football Team	15	(0)
2000	→ Changchun Yatai (loan)	12	(0)
2003–2007	Chongqing Lifan	55	(0)

International career^{‡}
2004–2005	China	6	(0)
Medal record
Representing China
Men's football
AFC Asian Cup
Silver medal – second place	2004 China	Team
East Asian Football Championship
Bronze medal – third place	2003 Japan	Team
Gold medal – first place	2005 South Korea	Team
- * Club domestic league appearances and goals as of 29 December 2014 ‡ National team caps and goals as of 29 December 2014

Li Jian (Chinese: 李健; born 9 December 1977, in Tianjin) is a former Chinese international football goalkeeper who played for China PR in the 2004 AFC Asian Cup.

== Club career ==
Li Jian would play for the youth squads at the Bayi Football Team before he was selected as being one of the most promising youth players in China, which saw him sent to Brazil for a training programme sponsored by Jianlibao. This then saw him called up to the Chinese under-20 national team where he was part of the squad that took part in the 1997 FIFA World Youth Championship, which China were knocked-out in the group stages. After the tournament Li Jian finished his training in Brazil and returned to the Bayi Football Team where he graduated to their senior team, however to gain playing time he was loaned out to second tier club Changchun Yatai F.C. in 2000.

In the 2001 league season Li Jian returned to Bayi where he would fight for the goalkeeping position with his former Chinese under-20 teammate Li Leilei as the club finished twelfth at the end of the season. The following season Li Leilei was selected as the first team goalkeeper as Li Jian was dropped to the bench, which saw him move to top tier club Chongqing Lifan F.C. where he gradually established himself as the team's first choice goalkeeper. After several seasons at the club on 24 September 2005 he was dropped from the team at half-time against Beijing Hyundai Football Club after a disappointing first half and saw Chongqing ultimately lose the game 2-0. After that result Li Jian struggled to regain his position within the team and by the following season saw the club relegated to the second tier, remained with the club to see out his contract before deciding to retire.
