= Wang Liang (footballer, born 1979) =

Chinese footballer

Wang Liang 王亮
Personal information
- Full name: Wang Liang
- Date of birth: April 1, 1979 (age 47)
- Place of birth: Shenyang, Liaoning, China
- Height: 1.85 m (6 ft 1 in)
- Positions: Right back; right midfielder

Youth career
- Liaoning FC

Senior career*
Years	Team	Apps	(Gls)
1999–2005	Liaoning FC	128	(5)
2006–2011	Shandong Luneng Taishan	43	(0)
2008	→ Liaoning FC (loan)	18	(0)
2012–2016	Liaoning Whowin	48	(1)

International career^{‡}
2000–2006	China	11	(0)

Managerial career
- 2017: Liaoning FC (assistant)
- 2017-2018: Guizhou Hengfeng (assistant)
- 2019: Guangdong South China Tiger (assistant)
- 2020: Guangzhou R&F (assistant)
- 2021-2023: Wuhan Yangtze River (assistant)
- 2022: China (assistant)
- 2023–2024: Yunnan Yukun (assistant)
- 2024–2026: Liaoning Tieren (assistant)
Medal record
Representing China
Men's football
EAFF Championship
Gold medal – first place	2005 South Korea	Team
- * Club domestic league appearances and goals as of 30 October 2016 ‡ National team caps and goals as of 27 March 2010

Wang Liang (Chinese: 王亮; pinyin: Wáng Liàng) (born April 1, 1979) is a Chinese football coach and former football player who played as a right back or right midfielder.

== Club career ==
Wang Liang started his career with Liaoning FC making his debut in 1999. The following season he would establish himself as a regular playing in 17 games. He would eventually play for Liaoning for seven season before transferring to Shandong Luneng Taishan where he had a mixed period, winning the China Super League with them but unable to establish himself as a regular. He would move back to Liaoning after two seasons with Shandong on loan. Liaoning were relegated in the Chinese Super League 2008 season and Wang Liang returned to Shandong.

== International career ==
Wang Liang began his senior international football career on July 28, 2000 in a friendly against South Korea that China lost 1-0. After several friendlies he could not establish himself within the Chinese team and it was not until Zhu Guanghu became the Chinese Head coach did Wang become a consistent member within the team. He would experience some success with the team when he won the 2005 East Asian Football Championship, however when qualification for the 2007 AFC Asian Cup came about Zhu decided to drop Wang for the experienced Sun Jihai and the versatility of Cao Yang.

== Honours ==
=== Club ===
Shandong Luneng

- Chinese Super League: 2006, 2010
- Chinese FA Cup: 2006

=== Country ===
- East Asian Football Championship: 2005
