= Hao Junmin =

Chinese footballer (born 1987)

Hao Junmin 蒿俊闵
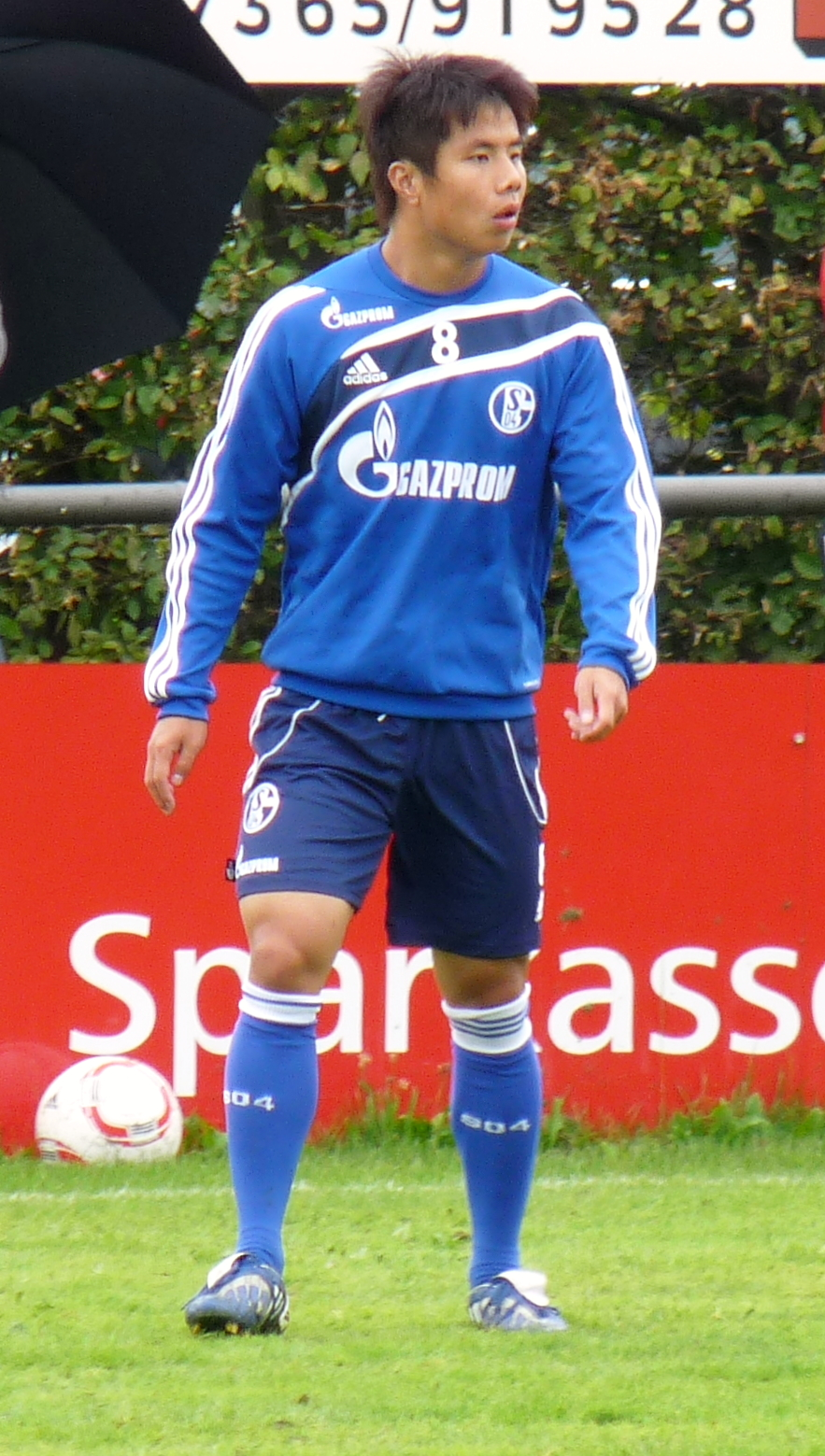
- Hao with Schalke 04 in 2010

Personal information
- Date of birth: 24 March 1987 (age 39)
- Place of birth: Wuhan, Hubei, China
- Height: 1.78 m (5 ft 10 in)
- Position: Midfielder

Team information
- Current team: Chengdu Rongcheng (assistant coach)

Youth career
- 1998–2001: Wuhan Football School
- 2002–2003: Tianjin TEDA

Senior career*
Years	Team	Apps	(Gls)
2004–2009	Tianjin TEDA	133	(16)
2010–2011	Schalke 04	14	(0)
2011–2021	Shandong Luneng	213	(9)
2021	Wuhan FC	13	(0)
2022	Guangzhou FC	13	(0)

International career^{‡}
2002–2003	China U17		
2004–2005	China U20		
2006–2008	China U23		
2005–2022	China	90	(12)

Managerial career
- 2024: Cangzhou Mighty Lions (assistant)
- 2025: Qingdao Hainiu (assistant)
- 2026–: Chengdu Rongcheng (assistant)
Medal record
Representing China
Men's football
EAFF Championship
Gold medal – first place	2005 South Korea	Team
Bronze medal – third place	2008 China	Team
East Asian Games
Gold medal – first place	2001 Macau	Football
AFC Youth Championship
Silver medal – second place	2004 َ Malaysia	Team
- * Club domestic league appearances and goals as of 4 November 2023 ‡ National team caps and goals as of 29 March 2022

Hao Junmin
- Simplified Chinese: 蒿俊闵
- Traditional Chinese: 蒿俊閔
Transcriptions
Standard Mandarin
- Hanyu Pinyin: Hāo Jùnmǐn
- IPA: [xáu tɕŷm mìn] (Note: In isolation, 俊 is pronounced [tɕŷn].)

Hao Junmin (Chinese: 蒿俊闵; pinyin: Hāo Jùnmǐn; born 24 March 1987) is a Chinese football manager and former professional footballer who played as a midfielder.

== Club career ==
Hao Junmin started his football career with Tianjin TEDA when he made his debut for the club on 15 September 2004 in a 2–0 win against Liaoning Zhongyu. This was then followed by his first goal for the club on 28 November 2004 in a 5–1 win against Liaoning Zhongyu. He would establish himself as a regular for the club and aided them to a fourth-place finish in the 2005 season. This saw not only his importance towards the team but the following seasons would see him personally rise towards predominance when he would win the Chinese Football Association Young Player of the Year award in both 2006 and 2007. His talent would then start to shine when he aided Tianjin to finish high enough for them to qualify for the club's first ever AFC Champions League campaign during the 2008 season.

On 22 January 2010, Hao left Tianjin TEDA to sign with Bundesliga side Schalke 04. He made his debut for the club on 6 March 2010 in a 4–1 win against Eintracht Frankfurt, becoming the first Chinese footballer to ever play for Schalke 04. He was originally given the shirt number 7, but was asked to surrender it when Raúl was signed on 28 July 2010. Hao, being a longtime fan of the legendary Spanish striker, happily obliged and received the number 8 shirt instead.

On 8 July 2011, Hao transferred to Chinese Super League side Shandong Luneng even though he still had one year remaining on his contract with Schalke 04. Hao suffered an injury during preseason training and was out for the majority of the 2013 season. He made his first appearance of the season back from injury on 10 August 2013 in a 3–2 win against Shanghai Shenhua.

On 25 July 2021, Hao joined hometown club Wuhan FC on a free transfer.

== International career ==
Hao worked his way up by first playing for the China under-17 national team in the 2003 FIFA U-17 World Championship and then progressed to the China under-20 national team that took part in 2005 FIFA World Youth Championship. His performances were good enough for him to join the national team to play in the 2005 East Asian Cup where he made his debut on 3 August 2005 in a 2–2 draw against Japan. Under then manager Zhu Guanghu, his international career would flourish; however, he was not called up for the 2007 AFC Asian Cup due to illness. In 2008, Hao was eligible to play for the 2008 Summer Olympics squad where he started two of the three group games in the tournament.

== Coaching career ==
On 14 August 2026, Hao joined Chinese Super League side Chengdu Rongcheng as assistant coach.

== Career statistics ==
=== Club ===
As of 4 November 2023

Appearances and goals by club, season and competition
Club	Season	League			National Cup		League Cup		Continental		Other		Total	
Club	Season	Division	Apps	Goals	Apps	Goals	Apps	Goals	Apps	Goals	Apps	Goals	Apps	Goals
Tianjin TEDA	2004	Chinese Super League	10	1	0	0	0	0	–		–		10	1
Tianjin TEDA	2005	Chinese Super League	18	1	1	0	0	0	–		–		19	1
Tianjin TEDA	2006	Chinese Super League	26	1	3	1	–		–		–		29	2
Tianjin TEDA	2007	Chinese Super League	28	5	–		–		–		–		28	5
Tianjin TEDA	2008	Chinese Super League	24	6	–		–		–		–		24	6
Tianjin TEDA	2009	Chinese Super League	27	2	–		–		5	0	–		32	2
Tianjin TEDA	Total		133	16	4	1	0	0	5	0	0	0	142	17
Schalke 04	2009-10	Bundesliga	8	0	1	0	–		–		–		9	0
Schalke 04	2010-11	Bundesliga	6	0	2	0	–		2	0	–		10	0
Schalke 04	Total		14	0	3	0	0	0	2	0	0	0	19	0
Shandong Luneng	2011	Chinese Super League	12	1	1	0	–		–		–		13	1
Shandong Luneng	2012	Chinese Super League	27	2	3	0	–		–		–		30	2
Shandong Luneng	2013	Chinese Super League	9	0	0	0	–		–		–		9	0
Shandong Luneng	2014	Chinese Super League	15	0	6	0	–		3	0	–		24	0
Shandong Luneng	2015	Chinese Super League	27	2	3	0	–		5	0	1 (Note: Appearances in Chinese FA Super Cup)	0	36	2
Shandong Luneng	2016	Chinese Super League	27	0	1	0	–		11	1	–		39	1
Shandong Luneng	2017	Chinese Super League	29	1	3	1	–		–		–		32	2
Shandong Luneng	2018	Chinese Super League	28	2	7	0	–		–		–		35	2
Shandong Luneng	2019	Chinese Super League	23	1	4	0	–		9	1	–		36	2
Shandong Luneng	2020	Chinese Super League	14	0	5	0	–		–		–		19	0
Shandong Luneng	2021	Chinese Super League	2	0	0	0	–		–		–		2	0
Shandong Luneng	Total	Chinese Super League	213	9	33	1	0	0	28	2	1	0	275	12
Wuhan FC	2021	Chinese Super League	13	0	0	0	–		–		–		13	0
Guangzhou FC	2022	Chinese Super League	13	0	0	0	–		–		–		13	0
Career total			384	25	40	2	0	0	35	2	1	0	460	29

=== International ===
Appearances and goals by national team and year
National team	Year	Apps	Goals
China	2005	1	0
China	2006	5	0
China	2007	2	0
China	2008	8	2
China	2009	10	3
China	2010	4	0
China	2011	11	4
China	2012	4	2
China	2013	0	0
China	2014	3	0
China	2015	3	0
China	2016	8	1
China	2017	7	0
China	2018	2	0
China	2019	12	0
China	2020	0	0
China	2021	7	0
China	2022	3	0
Total		90	12

Scores and results list China's goal tally first, score column indicates score after each Hao goal.

List of international goals scored by Hao Junmin
No.	Date	Venue	Opponent	Score	Result	Competition
1	23 February 2008	Olympic Sports Center, Chongqing, China	North Korea	3–1	3–1	2008 EAFF Championship
2	25 May 2008	Kunshan Stadium, Kunshan, China	Jordan	1–0	2–0	Friendly
3	21 January 2009	Yellow Dragon Sports Center, Hangzhou, China	Vietnam	5–1	6–1	2011 AFC Asian Cup qualifier
4	29 May 2009	Shanghai Stadium, Shanghai, China	Germany	1–0	1–1	Friendly
5	25 July 2009	Olympic Center Stadium, Tianjin, China	Kyrgyzstan	2–0	3–0	Friendly
	2 January 2011	Al Gharafa Stadium, Doha, Qatar	Iraq	1–0	3–2	Friendly (Note: Non FIFA 'A' international match)
6	16 January 2011	Al Gharafa Stadium, Doha, Qatar	Uzbekistan	2–2	2–2	2011 AFC Asian Cup
7	23 July 2011	Tuodong Stadium, Kunming, China	Laos	5–2	7–2	2014 FIFA World Cup qualifier
8	23 July 2011	Tuodong Stadium, Kunming, China	Laos	7–2	7–2	2014 FIFA World Cup qualifier
9	6 September 2011	Amman International Stadium, Amman, Jordan	Jordan	1–2	1–2	2014 FIFA World Cup qualifier
10	29 February 2012	Guangzhou University City Stadium, Guangzhou, China	Jordan	1–0	3–1	2014 FIFA World Cup qualifier
11	29 February 2012	Guangzhou University City Stadium, Guangzhou, China	Jordan	2–0	3–1	2014 FIFA World Cup qualifier
	3 January 2015	Campbelltown Stadium, Campbelltown, Australia	Oman	1–1	4–1	Friendly^{1}
12	1 September 2016	Seoul World Cup Stadium, Seoul, South Korea	South Korea	2–3	2–3	2018 FIFA World Cup qualifier

== Honours ==
Schalke 04

- DFB-Pokal: 2010-11

Shandong Luneng

- Chinese FA Cup: 2014, 2020
- Chinese FA Super Cup: 2015

China

- East Asian Football Championship: 2005

Individual

- Chinese Football Association Young Player of the Year: 2005, 2007
- Chinese Super League Team of the Year: 2005, 2007, 2017, 2019
