= Chen Tao (footballer) =

Chinese footballer (born 1985)

Chen Tao 陈涛
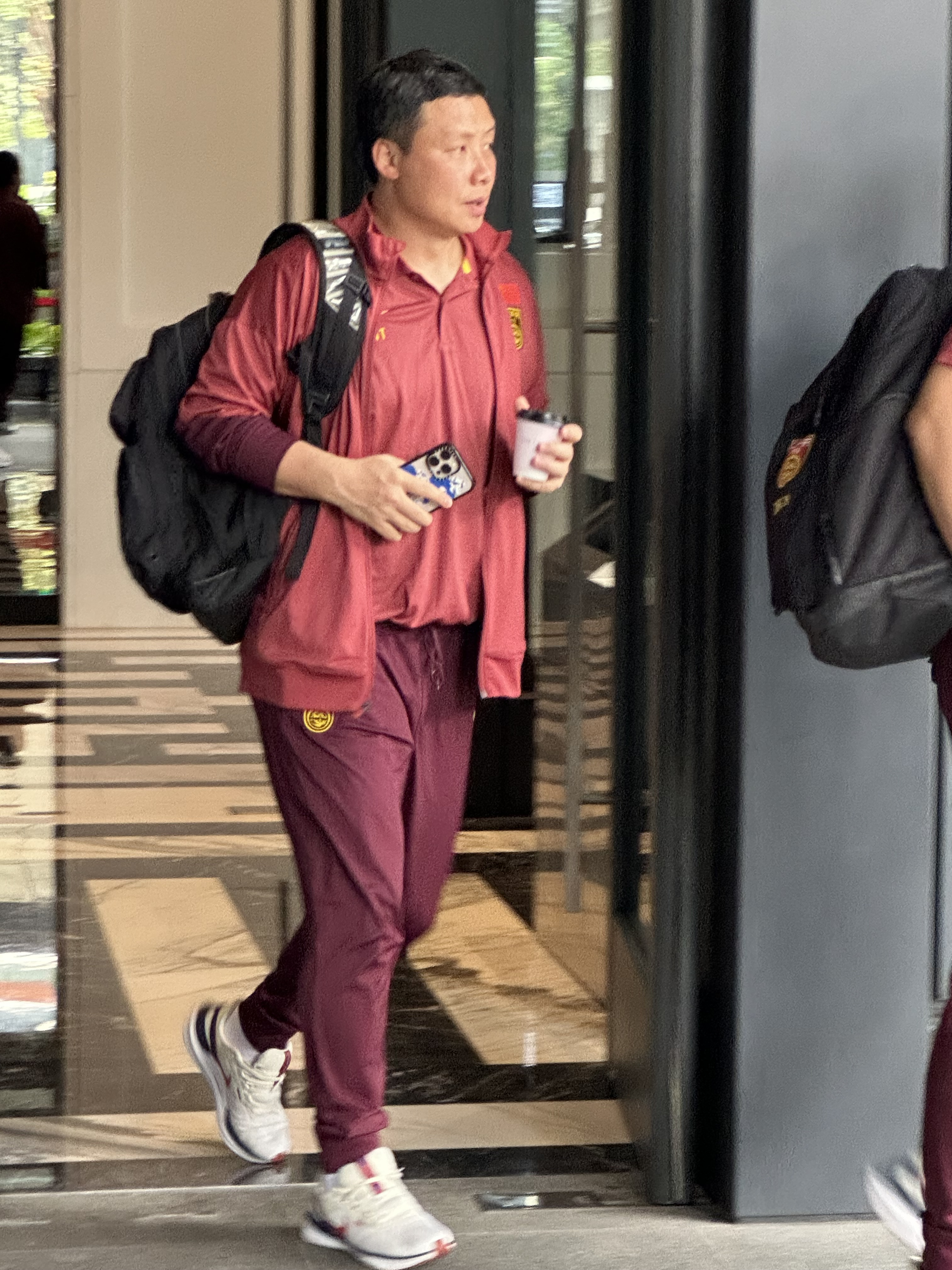
- Chen Tao in June 2025

Personal information
- Full name: Chen Tao
- Date of birth: 11 March 1985 (age 41)
- Place of birth: Anshan, Liaoning, China
- Height: 1.78 m (5 ft 10 in)
- Position: Midfielder

Team information
- Current team: Shaanxi Union (head coach)

Senior career*
Years	Team	Apps	(Gls)
2002–2008	Changsha Ginde	79	(11)
2009–2010	Shanghai Shenhua	30	(2)
2010	→ Tianjin Teda (loan)	14	(2)
2011–2012	Tianjin Teda	35	(4)
2013–2015	Dalian Aerbin	60	(3)
2016–2020	Sichuan Longfor	30	(5)

International career^{‡}
2005–2007	China U20		
2008	China U23		
2005–2013	China	21	(2)

Managerial career
- 2023: Shenzhen FC
- 2023–2025: China (assistant)
- 2025: Shenzhen Peng City (assistant)
- 2025–2026: Shenzhen Peng City
- 2026–: Shaanxi Union
Medal record
Representing China
Men's football
EAFF Championship
Gold medal – first place	2005 South Korea	Team
East Asian Games
Gold medal – first place	2005 Macau	Football
AFC Youth Championship
Silver medal – second place	2004 Malaysia	Team
- * Club domestic league appearances and goals as of 14 October 2017 ‡ National team caps and goals as of 2 November 2014

Chen Tao (simplified Chinese: 陈涛; traditional Chinese: 陳濤; pinyin: Chén Tāo; born 11 March 1985) is a Chinese football manager and former professional footballer.

== Club career ==
=== Changsha Ginde ===
Chen Tao started his football career with Shenyang Ginde in the 2003 season where he made an immediate impact by playing in eighteen league games and scoring one goal. He would continue to establish himself as an important member of the squad throughout the following seasons and would further cement his position within the team by playing as captain throughout the 2004 season. Though he often lead Shenyang Ginde to mid-table or lowly positions within the league he would be a loyal member of the team even when they decided to move to Changsha and changed their name to Changsha Ginde, however during the start of the 2008 season he was involved in a bitter transfer dispute with his club. He made an announcement that if he failed to secure a transfer to FC Luch-Energiya, then he would retire from football and the Chinese national team. FC Luch-Energiya announced that they had agreed a price with Changsha Ginde and agreed personal terms with the player, but the transfer papers from Changsha failed to materialize, therefore the transfer has fallen through.

=== Shanghai Shenhua ===
After an entire season where Chen was unable to secure a move yet still contractually obliged to Changsha Ginde, he was finally released by the club at the beginning of the 2009 season where he moved to Shanghai Shenhua. He made his competitive debut for Shenhua on his 24th birthday, in their first Asian Champions League group stage match against Singapore Armed Forces, where they won 4-1. He would quickly go on to establish himself an integral member of the team and go on to score his first goal for the club on 3 April 2009 in a league game against Shandong Luneng that Shenhua won 4-1. Shenhua were expected to be title contenders that season, however they finished in a disappointing fifth. This saw the club bring in experienced manager Miroslav Blažević into the team the following season and he decided to place Jiang Kun in midfield instead.

=== Tianjin Teda ===
After being dropped by Shanghai Shenhua, Chen was given a chance to go on loan to top tier side Tianjin Teda during the 2010 season and would immediately make an impact towards the team when on his league debut on 27 July 2010 he would also score his first goal for the club against Henan Construction in a 2-1 victory. He would go on to be a vital member of the team and quickly saw Tianjin become runners-up within the league. After his successful stint with the club, Chen would make his move permanent and would transfer to Tianjin Teda permanently on 14 February 2011.

=== Dalian Aerbin ===
On 21 December 2012, Chen left Tianjin Teda and transferred to Dalian Aerbin. He made his debut for Dalian on 9 March 2013 in a 1-0 loss to Shandong Luneng.

=== Sichuan Longfor ===
On 23 June 2016, Chen signed for China League Two side Sichuan Longfor.

=== Retirement ===
On 29 May 2020, Chen Tao announced his retirement from professional football.

== Managerial career ==
Tao joined Shenzhen FC in 2020 as head coach of the elite team, before being promoted to assistant coach in 2021. In 2023, Tao was appointed as head coach of Shenzhen FC. On 14 July 2023, Tao resigned as the head coach of Shenzhen.

On 8 September 2025, Chen joined Chinese Super League club Shenzhen Peng City as assistant coach. On 31 May 2026, the club has annouanced Chen's departure.

On 21 June 2026, Chen was named as the head coach of China League One club Shaanxi Union.

== International career ==
Chen would play for the Chinese under-20 national team that took part in the 2005 FIFA World Youth Championship and would play in four games in a tournament that saw China knocked out in the last sixteen. This would see him promoted to the senior team and called up for the squad that took part in the 2005 East Asian Football Championship where he made his debut on 31 July 2005 against South Korea in a 1-1 draw. China would win the tournament and under the team's manager Zhu Guanghu, Chen would start to become a regular within the side, however still being under twenty years old the Chinese under-20 national team manager Liu Chunming would make him the captain for the team that took part in the 2007 Toulon Tournament in France and would make history by taking China to the finals for the first time, where they eventually lost to the hosts France. He was awarded the Souvenir Jean-Philippe Rethacker, which roughly means the most graceful player of the tournament. He also scored one of the best goals of the tournament, a match-winning free kick against Ghana. With the 2008 Summer Olympics looming, Chen was expected to captain the Chinese under-23 national team, however due to the lack of competitive playing time due to his off-field problems he had with his club, he only played in two games, both as a substitute.

== Career statistics ==
=== International goals ===
Date	Venue	Opponent	Score	Result	Competition
23 July 2011	Tuodong Stadium, Kunming, China	Laos	2–2	7–2	2014 FIFA World Cup qualifier
23 July 2011	Tuodong Stadium, Kunming, China	Laos	6–2	7–2	2014 FIFA World Cup qualifier

== Honours ==
=== Club ===
Tianjin Teda

- Chinese FA Cup: 2011

=== International ===
China PR national football team

- East Asian Football Championship: 2005

=== Individual ===
- Chinese Football Association Young Player of the Year: 2004
