= Shu Chang =

Shu Chang may refer to:

- Shu Chang (footballer) (born 1977), former Chinese footballer
- Shu Chang (actress) (born 1987), Chinese actress
