= Li Yi (footballer) =

Chinese footballer (born 1979)

Li Yi 李毅
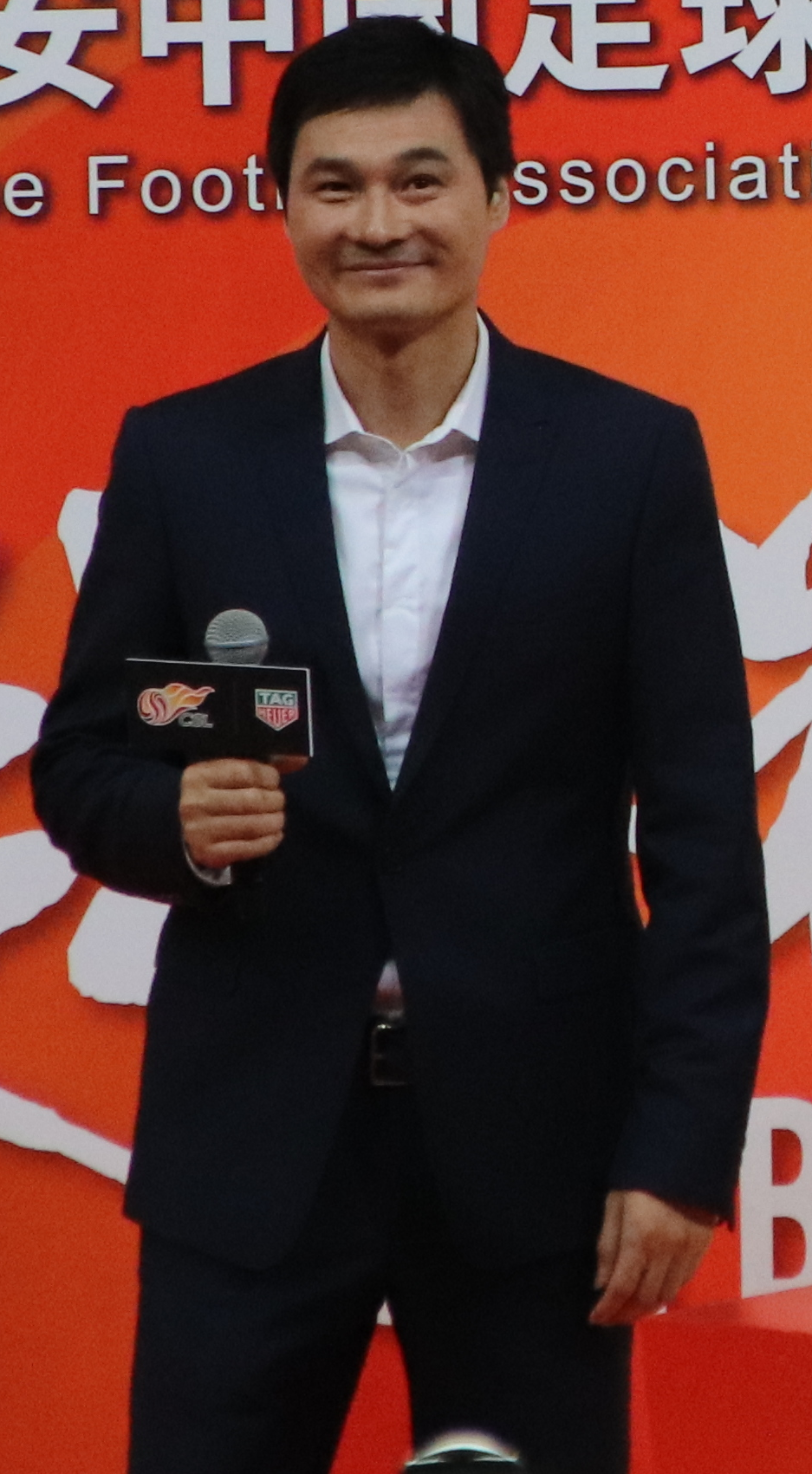

Personal information
- Date of birth: June 20, 1979 (age 47)
- Place of birth: Bengbu, Anhui, China
- Height: 1.84 m (6 ft 0 in)
- Position: Striker

Youth career
- 1991–1996: Tianjin Locomotive

Senior career*
Years	Team	Apps	(Gls)
1997–1998	Tianjin Locomotive	38	(8)
1999	Beijing Guoan (Loan)	18	(4)
2000–2006	Shenzhen Kingway	153	(52)
2007–2010	Shaanxi Chanba	57	(4)
Total		266	(68)

International career^{‡}
1998	China U20		
1998–1999	China U23		
2001–2006	China	30	(2)

Managerial career
- 2011–2013: Shenzhen Ruby (assistant)
- 2014–2015: Shenzhen Ruby
- 2019-2020: Hebei China Fortune (assistant)
- 2020-2021: Sichuan Jiuniu
Medal record
Representing China
Men's football
AFC Asian Cup
Silver medal – second place	2004 China	Team
East Asian Football Championship
Bronze medal – third place	2003 Japan	Team
- * Club domestic league appearances and goals as of December 1, 2010 ‡ National team caps and goals as of February 7, 2010

Li Yi (Chinese: 李毅; born June 20, 1979) is a Chinese football coach and former player.

As a player, he was a striker who represented Tianjin Locomotive, Beijing Guoan, Shaanxi Chanba and Shenzhen Kingway whom he won the 2004 Chinese Super League with. He would also represent the Chinese national team in the 2003 East Asian Football Championship and 2004 AFC Asian Cup. Since retiring he moved into football coaching and was assigned his first head coaching position with Shenzhen Ruby before leaving the club on 12 April 2015.

== Club career ==
Li Yi started his football career playing for the Tianjin Locomotive youth before he was promoted to their senior team in the 1997 league season. His performances for his club would see him attract the attentions of the Chinese U20 and Chinese U23 teams. This led to top tier club Beijing Guoan interested in his services, however they quickly found that Li Yi had already signed a pre-contract with fellow top tier side Shenzhen Pingan. Shenzhen would eventually allow a loan move to happen and Li Yi would move to Beijing throughout the 1999 league season.

At Shenzhen Pingan Li Yi would quickly establish himself with the team and at the end of the 2000 football league season he would score 9 goals from 21 appearances. During his time at Shenzhen he experienced significant success winning the Chinese Super League in 2004 as well as playing a significant role in the Shenzhen team that reached the semi-finals of the 2005 AFC Champions League by scoring two critical goals in-game and the third goal in over time, for a 3–1 win against Al-Ahli (Jeddah) of Saudi Arabia and being their top goalscorer with 5 goals. Within the tournament unconfirmed comments on the internet about Li claiming his ball shielding is similar and comparable to FIFA World Cup winner Thierry Henry, made him a target for much criticism from home fans. Viewing his off-field comments as pretentious he earned a nickname Imperator Li Yi the Great, and eventually became an Internet meme among Chinese netizens. In fact, Li never said such words. He did mention Thierry Henry after a 2005 AFC Champions League group stage match which Shenzhen beat Suwon Samsung Bluewings 1–0 at home. He said that he shielded the ball in the corner flag area in the injury time to ensure the victory, just like Thierry Henry did. The medium misrepresented his comments because they believed that saying Li's ball shielding was comparable to Thierry Henry can be more attracting.

The 2005 season would be a turbulent time for Shenzhen as their influential manager Zhu Guanghu was appointed the new manager of the China national football team and left Shenzhen. His successor Chi Shangbin would not wield the same respect and significant infighting occurred from senior influential players which included Li Weifeng, Yang Chen and Li Leilei, which coupled with the club's financial difficulties saw a mass exit. Li Yi would eventually follow these players by transferring to fellow top tier club Shaanxi Chanba at the beginning of the 2007 season. He would remain there until the 2010 league season before he decided to retire at the end of the season.

== International career ==
=== International debut ===
Li Yi received his first senior international call-up in 1999 by Chinese manager Bob Houghton while playing for Beijing Guoan, however he did not make his debut under him. Li did not make his debut until after his impressive displays for Shenzhen in 2001 and the new Chinese manager Bora Milutinović called him up for a 2002 FIFA World Cup qualification – AFC first round game against Cambodia on 6 May 2001, where he came on as a substitute for Li Jinyu in a 4–0 victory. After the game Li was tried out in several further games, however he could not gain a permanent place within the squad as Milutinović stuck with established players such as Hao Haidong as China went to the 2002 FIFA World Cup. When the World Cup ended Milutinović left and Arie Haan came in as the Chinese manager, which saw Li go on to establish himself as a regular under his reign.

=== 2003 East Asian Cup ===
The 2003 East Asian Football Championship game against China and Korea Republic football team opened in the face of heated political bitterness on both sides as Korea and China were bitterly embroiled over geographical claims over Goguryeo. With China having participated in the 2002 FIFA World Cup for the first time expectations for China had risen that they could end their losing streak against Korea Republic, a phenomenon termed "Koreaphobia" in China. Meanwhile, the Korean team was embittered over a previous meeting in 1998, which saw Hwang Sun-Hong severely injured, preventing him from playing in the 1998 World Cup in France.

=== 2004 AFC Asian Cup ===
Li Yi was called into the national team that played in 2004 AFC Asian Cup which China were hosting and eventually finished runners-up in. During this tournament Li Yi scored his second goal against Indonesia in a 5–0 win in the group stages. He played in the final as a substitute for Hao Haidong, however, China still lost the game 3–1 to Japan. After the 2004 AFC Asian Cup Li Yi found it increasingly more difficult to be named within the national team. Despite being named for several other friendlies Li Yi could not score within any games. Li Yi was completely dropped from the squad for the 2007 AFC Asian Cup and has since not played for the national team.

== International goals ==
No.	Date	Venue	Opponent	Score	Result	Competition
1.	3 July 2004	Chongqing Olympic Sports Center, Chongqing, China	Lebanon	6–0	6–0	Friendly
2.	21 July 2004	Workers Stadium, Beijing, China	Indonesia	5–0	5–0	2004 AFC Asian Cup

== Managerial career ==
On 22 July 2020, Li was appointed as head coach of China League One club Sichuan Jiuniu.

== Honours ==
Shenzhen Pingan

- Chinese Super League: 2004

== Filmography ==
=== Variety shows ===
Year	Name	Notes
2018	Keep Running	Season 2 Episode 8

== See also ==
- Eul-Yong Ta
