= 2003 East Asian Football Championship Final squads =

Below are the squads for the 2003 East Asian Football Championship tournament in Japan. There were 23 players in each squad, including three goalkeepers.

== China ==
Coach: (Netherlands) Arie Haan

No.	Pos.	Player	Date of birth (age)	Caps	Club
1	GK	Liu Yunfei	8 May 1979 (aged 24)		(China) Tianjin Taida
2	DF	Xu Yunlong	17 February 1979 (aged 24)		(China) Beijing Hyundai
3	MF	Xiao Zhanbo	22 July 1975 (aged 28)		(China) Qingdao Beilaite
4	DF	Li Weifeng (captain)	1 December 1978 (aged 25)		(China) Shenzhen Jianlibao
5	DF	Ji Mingyi	15 December 1980 (aged 22)		(China) Dalian Shide
6	MF	Zheng Zhi	20 August 1980 (aged 23)		(China) Shenzhen Jianlibao
7	MF	Sun Jihai	30 September 1977 (aged 26)		(England) Manchester City
8	MF	Zhao Junzhe	19 April 1979 (aged 24)		(China) Liaoning Polarsun Automobile
9	FW	Hao Haidong	25 August 1970 (aged 33)		(China) Dalian Shide
10	MF	Zhou Haibin	19 July 1985 (aged 18)		(China) Shandong Luneng
11	FW	Li Yi	2 June 1979 (aged 24)		(China) Shenzhen Jianlibao
12	DF	Zhang Yaokun	17 April 1981 (aged 22)		(China) Dalian Shide
13	GK	Han Wenhai	28 January 1971 (aged 32)		(China) Shenyang Jinde
14	MF	Liu Jindong	9 December 1981 (aged 21)		(China) Shandong Luneng
15	DF	Du Wei	9 February 1982 (aged 21)		(China) Shanghai Shenhua
16	MF	Zhao Xuri	3 December 1985 (aged 18)		(China) Sichuan Guancheng
17	MF	Zhou Ting	5 February 1979 (aged 24)		(China) Yunnan Hongta
18	FW	Zhang Shuo	17 September 1983 (aged 20)		(China) Tianjin Taida
19	FW	Zheng Bin	4 July 1977 (aged 26)		(China) Shenzhen Jianlibao
20	DF	Wei Xin	18 April 1977 (aged 26)		(China) Chongqing Lifan
21	FW	Du Ping	28 February 1978 (aged 25)		(China) Shenyang Jinde
22	FW	Yang Chen	17 January 1974 (aged 29)		(China) Shenzhen Jianlibao
23	GK	Li Jian	9 December 1977 (aged 25)		(China) Chongqing Lifan

== Hong Kong ==
Coach: (Hong Kong) Lai Sun Cheung

No.	Pos.	Player	Date of birth (age)	Caps	Club
1	GK	Chan Ka Ki	25 April 1979 (aged 24)		(Hong Kong) Sun Hei
2	DF	Leung Chi Wing	29 April 1978 (aged 25)		(Hong Kong) Sun Hei
3	MF	Man Pei Tak	16 February 1982 (aged 21)		(Hong Kong) Buler Rangers
4	MF	Sham Kwok Keung	10 September 1985 (aged 18)		(Hong Kong) Happy Valley
5	DF	Lai Kai Cheuk	5 July 1977 (aged 26)		(Hong Kong) Happy Valley
6	MF	Lau Chi Keung	7 January 1977 (aged 26)		(Hong Kong) Sun Hei
7	MF	Law Chun Bong	25 January 1981 (aged 22)		(Hong Kong) Sun Hei
8	MF	Cheung Sai Ho	27 August 1975 (aged 28)		(Hong Kong) Happy Valley
9	FW	Chan Ho Man	14 May 1980 (aged 23)		(Hong Kong) Sun Hei
10	MF	Tam Wai Kwok	15 March 1977 (aged 26)		(Hong Kong) South China
11	MF	Kwok Yue Hung	28 February 1975 (aged 28)		(Hong Kong) Happy Valley
12	MF	Wong Chun Yue	28 January 1978 (aged 25)		(Hong Kong) Sun Hei
13	DF	Szeto Man Chun	5 June 1975 (aged 28)		(Hong Kong) South China
14	DF	Lo Chi Kwan	18 March 1981 (aged 22)		(Hong Kong) Sun Hei
15	DF	Chan Wai Ho	24 April 1982 (aged 21)		(Hong Kong) Buler Rangers
16	DF	Luk Koon Pong	1 August 1978 (aged 25)		(Hong Kong) South China
17	GK	Goldbert Chi Chiu	1 August 1981 (aged 22)		(Hong Kong) Buler Rangers
18	DF	Lee Wai Man (captain)	18 August 1973 (aged 30)		(Hong Kong) Happy Valley
19	GK	Fan Chun Yip	1 May 1976 (aged 27)		(Hong Kong) Happy Valley
20	DF	Poon Yiu Cheuk	19 September 1977 (aged 26)		(Hong Kong) Happy Valley
21	FW	Lawrence Akandu	10 December 1974 (aged 28)		(Hong Kong) Happy Valley
22	DF	Ng Wai Chiu	22 October 1981 (aged 22)		(China) Guangzhou Xiangxue

== Japan ==
Coach: (Brazil) Zico

No.	Pos.	Player	Date of birth (age)	Caps	Club
1	GK	Seigo Narazaki	15 April 1976 (aged 27)		(Japan) Nagoya Grampus Eight
2	DF	Nobuhisa Yamada	10 September 1975 (aged 28)		(Japan) Urawa Reds
3	DF	Keisuke Tsuboi	16 September 1979 (aged 24)		(Japan) Urawa Reds
4	DF	Teruyuki Moniwa	8 September 1981 (aged 22)		(Japan) FC Tokyo
5	DF	Tsuneyasu Miyamoto (captain)	7 February 1977 (aged 26)		(Japan) Gamba Osaka
6	DF	Atsuhiro Miura	24 June 1974 (aged 29)		(Japan) Tokyo Verdy
7	MF	Naohiro Ishikawa	12 May 1981 (aged 22)		(Japan) FC Tokyo
8	MF	Mitsuo Ogasawara	5 April 1979 (aged 24)		(Japan) Kashima Antlers
9	FW	Tatsuhiko Kubo	18 June 1976 (aged 27)		(Japan) Yokohama F. Marinos
10	MF	Toshiya Fujita	4 October 1971 (aged 32)		(Japan) Jubilo Iwata
11	FW	Teruaki Kurobe	6 March 1978 (aged 25)		(Japan) Kyoto Purple Sanga
12	GK	Ryota Tsuzuki	18 April 1978 (aged 25)		(Japan) Urawa Reds
13	FW	Masashi Motoyama	20 June 1979 (aged 24)		(Japan) Kashima Antlers
14	DF	Alex	20 July 1977 (aged 26)		(Japan) Shimizu S-Pulse
15	MF	Takashi Fukunishi	1 September 1976 (aged 27)		(Japan) Jubilo Iwata
16	MF	Daisuke Oku	7 February 1976 (aged 27)		(Japan) Yokohama F. Marinos
17	MF	Takuya Yamada	24 August 1974 (aged 29)		(Japan) Tokyo Verdy
18	MF	Yuki Abe	6 September 1981 (aged 22)		(Japan) JEF United Ichihara
19	MF	Yasuhito Endo	28 January 1980 (aged 23)		(Japan) Gamba Osaka
20	FW	Yoshito Okubo	9 June 1982 (aged 21)		(Japan) Cerezo Osaka
21	DF	Akira Kaji	13 January 1980 (aged 23)		(Japan) FC Tokyo
22	DF	Yuji Nakazawa	25 February 1978 (aged 25)		(Japan) Yokohama F. Marinos
23	GK	Yoichi Doi	25 July 1973 (aged 30)		(Japan) FC Tokyo

== South Korea ==
Coach: (Portugal) Humberto Coelho

No.	Pos.	Player	Date of birth (age)	Caps	Club
1	GK	Lee Woon-jae	26 April 1973 (aged 30)		(South Korea) Suwon Samsung Bluewings
2	MF	Hyun Young-min	25 December 1979 (aged 23)		(South Korea) Ulsan Hyundai Horang-i
3	MF	Chun Jae-ho	8 August 1979 (aged 24)		(South Korea) Seongnam Ilhwa Chunma
4	DF	Choi Jin-cheul	26 March 1971 (aged 32)		(South Korea) Chonbuk Hyundai Motors
5	DF	Kim Hyun-soo	13 March 1973 (aged 30)		(South Korea) Seongnam Ilhwa Chunma
6	DF	Yoo Sang-chul (captain)	18 October 1971 (aged 32)		(Japan) Yokohama F. Marinos
7	DF	Kim Tae-young	8 November 1970 (aged 33)		(South Korea) Chunnam Dragons
8	MF	Choi Won-kwon	8 November 1981 (aged 22)		(South Korea) Anyang LG Cheetahs
9	FW	Kim Do-hoon	21 July 1970 (aged 33)		(South Korea) Seongnam Ilhwa Chunma
10	FW	Lee Kwan-woo	25 February 1978 (aged 25)		(South Korea) Daejeon Citizen
11	FW	Choi Yong-soo	10 September 1973 (aged 30)		(Japan) JEF United Ichihara
12	MF	Kim Dong-jin	29 January 1982 (aged 21)		(South Korea) Anyang LG Cheetahs
13	DF	Lee Eul-yong	8 September 1975 (aged 28)		(South Korea) Anyang LG Cheetahs
14	FW	Kim Eun-jung	8 April 1979 (aged 24)		(Japan) Vegalta Sendai
15	DF	Park Jae-hong	10 November 1978 (aged 25)		(South Korea) Chonbuk Hyundai Motors
16	FW	Chung Kyung-ho	22 May 1980 (aged 23)		(South Korea) Ulsan Hyundai Horang-i
18	FW	Kim Dae-eui	30 May 1974 (aged 29)		(South Korea) Seongnam Ilhwa Chunma
19	FW	Ahn Jung-hwan	27 January 1976 (aged 27)		(Japan) Shimizu S-Pulse
20	FW	Kim Do-heon	14 July 1982 (aged 21)		(South Korea) Suwon Samsung Bluewings
21	GK	Kim Yong-dae	11 October 1979 (aged 24)		(South Korea) Busan I'Cons
22	DF	Cho Se-kwon	26 June 1978 (aged 25)		(South Korea) Ulsan Hyundai Horang-i
23	GK	Kim Hae-woon	25 December 1973 (aged 29)		(South Korea) Seongnam Ilhwa Chunma
