= Li Leilei =

Chinese footballer and coach

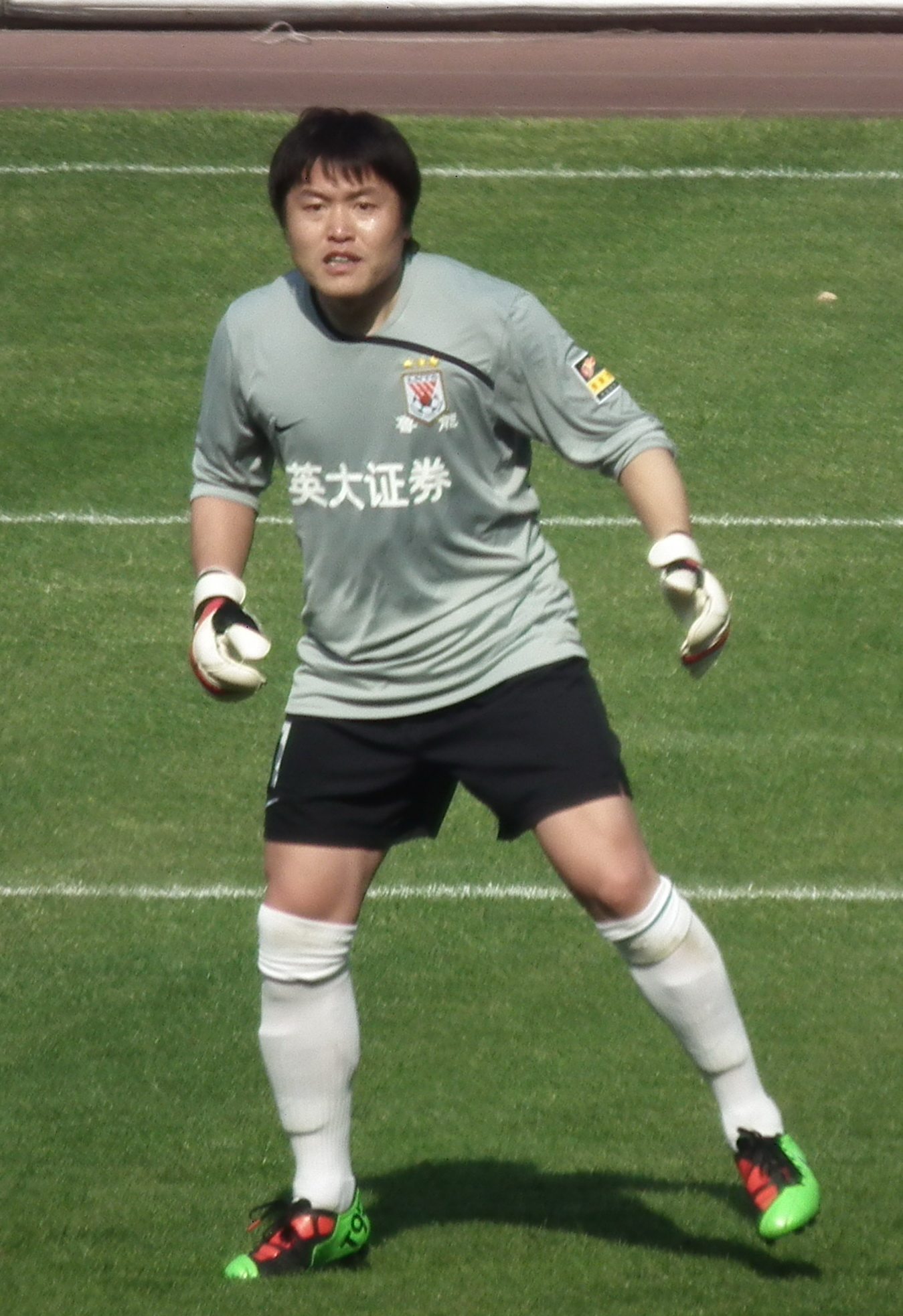

Personal information
- Full name: Li Leilei
- Date of birth: June 30, 1977 (age 49)
- Place of birth: Beijing, China
- Height: 1.83 m (6 ft 0 in)
- Position: Goalkeeper

Youth career
- 1989–1996: Bayi Youth

Senior career*
Years	Team	Apps	(Gls)
1999–2003	Bayi	70	(0)
2004–2005	Shenzhen Jianlibao	35	(0)
2006–2012	Shandong Luneng	111	(0)
Total		216	(0)

International career^{‡}
2005–2007	China	23	(0)

Managerial career
- 2017: Beijing Guoan reserve (goalkeeping)
- 2017–2019: China U21 (goalkeeping)
- 2020: Shandong Luneng (goalkeeping)
- 2021: Wuhan Yangtze River (goalkeeping)
- 2022: China (goalkeeping)
- 2024–2025: China U19 (goalkeeping)
- 2024: Cangzhou Mighty Lions (goalkeeping)
- 2025: China (goalkeeping)
- 2026–: Qingdao West Coast (goalkeeping)
Medal record
Representing China
Men's football
EAFF Championship
Gold medal – first place	2005 South Korea	Team
AFC Youth Championship
Silver medal – second place	1996 َ South Korea	Team
- * Club domestic league appearances and goals as of 16 October 2012 ‡ National team caps and goals as of 16 October 2012

Li Leilei (simplified Chinese: 李雷雷; traditional Chinese: 李雷雷; pinyin: Lǐ Léiléi; born June 30, 1977, in Beijing) is a Chinese former football goalkeeper and current goalkeeping coach of Qingdao West Coast.

== Club career ==
Li Leilei started his career with second tier club Bayi Football Team in the 1999 Chinese league season and would go on to become their first choice goalkeeper. With them he would gain promotion at the end of 2000, however after three seasons in the top tier the club were relegated at the end of the 2003 league season and disbanded due to financial difficulties brought about by professional football. This saw Li Leilei join another top tier club in Shenzhen Jianlibao where he was immediately made the club's first choice goalkeeper by the team's Head coach Zhu Guanghu and had an extremely successful debut season with them by winning the 2004 Chinese Super League. The following season wasn't to prove as successful for Li Leilei, however he still drew the interests from Shandong Luneng who he transferred to for 5 million yuan at the beginning of the 2006 league season.

At Shandong he was the first choice goalkeeper of the league and cup 2006 double winning campaign. By now Li Leilei had also established himself as China's main goalkeeper and by the 2008 league season he would continue his pivotal role for the club by again winning the Chinese Super League title. By the end of the 2009 league season the Shandong Head coach Ljubiša Tumbaković had left the club after a disappointing season and was replaced by Branko Ivanković who decided to promote the youngster Yang Cheng as first choice goalkeeper, which saw Li Leilei limited to a single appearance throughout the 2010 campaigned as he watched Shandong win another league title.

At the end of the 2011 league season he did not make a single appearance for Shandong and with his contract having finished Li Leilei retired from football.

== International career ==
Li Leilei was given the chance to make his senior debut on May 29, 2005, against Republic of Ireland by the recently appointed Chinese Head coach Zhu Guanghu in a match China lost 1–0. During this period he was playing understudy to Liu Yunfei until the sudden retirement of Liu Yunfei in 2006 established Li Leilei as first choice goalkeeper in the run up to the 2007 AFC Asian Cup. Within the tournament Li Leilei would play the first two group games before injury ruled him out for the final group game.

== Coaching career ==
Li became the goalkeeping coach of his hometown club Beijing Guoan in December 2012.

== Personal life ==
Li Leilei's father, Li Songhai (李松海), was also a football goalkeeper.

== Honours ==
=== Club ===
Shenzhen Jianlibao

- Chinese Super League: 2004

Shandong Luneng

- Chinese Super League: 2006, 2008, 2010
- Chinese FA Cup: 2006

=== International ===
China PR national football team

- East Asian Football Championship: 2005
