= Liu Jindong =

Chinese footballer (born 1981)

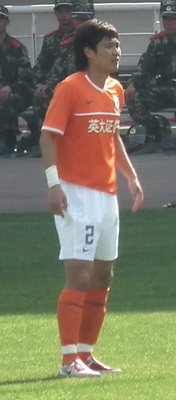

Personal information
- Date of birth: December 9, 1981 (age 44)
- Place of birth: Qingdao, Shandong, China
- Height: 1.82 m (5 ft 11 1/2 in)
- Positions: Defender; defensive midfielder

Youth career
- 1996–1998: Shandong Luneng
- 1999: Changchun Yatai

Senior career*
Years	Team	Apps	(Gls)
2000–2014	Shandong Luneng	227	(4)

International career^{‡}
2003–2009	China	14	(1)

Managerial career
- 2021–2024: Tai'an Tiankuang
- 2024–2026: Shandong Taishan (assistant)
Medal record
Representing China
Men's football
East Asian Football Championship
Bronze medal – third place	2003 Japan	Team
- * Club domestic league appearances and goals as of 11 Nov 2013 ‡ National team caps and goals as of 1 Jan 2012

Liu Jindong (simplified Chinese: 刘金东; traditional Chinese: 劉金東; pinyin: Líu Jīndōng; December 9, 1981, in Qingdao, Shandong) is a Chinese international football coach and former football player who played as a versatile player capable of playing in defense or midfield. With Shandong Luneng he had won several domestic league and cup trophies with them before becoming the team's captain at the start of the 2010 league season where he would go on to lead the team to the league title.

== Club career ==
Liu Jindong started his professional football career in 2001 for Shandong Luneng after he graduated from their youth team. In his first season for Shandong he was able to play in seven games before establishing himself the following season where he played a further nineteen games. Due to his versatility he has been able to establish himself as a regular member of the team since and has helped Shandong win the 2006 and 2008 league titles. By the 2009 league season he would settle within defense and was given the vice-captaincy role within the club; however, the team's captain Shu Chang would suffer several long-term injury problems throughout season, and Liu Jindong spent the majority as the team's captain. When new manager Branko Ivanković arrived at the club at the beginning of the 2010 league season, he decided to make Liu his permanent captain, and this seemed to have worked, as Shandong would go on to win the league title at the end of season.

== International career ==
Liu Jindong received his international debut against Chile in a 0–0 friendly match draw on August 20, 2003, where he played in midfield. Under Chinese manager Arie Haan, Liu Jindong was able to gain regular playing time for the national team and would even score his first international goal on December 11, 2003, in an East Asian Cup game vs Hong Kong. Despite playing in several friendlies leading up to the 2004 AFC Asian Cup he was not picked in the final squad to play in the tournament, with Zhou Haibin preferred.

When Arie Haan left the Chinese team his replacement Zhu Guanghu completely left Liu Jindong out of all of his squads and this was to continue under Vladimir Petrović. Liu Jindong would have to wait five years until Gao Hongbo came in before he made his return in a friendly match against Germany in a 1–1 draw on May 29, 2009. He would continue to re-establish himself when he played in another friendly against Saudi Arabia in another friendly match, which China lost 4–1 on June 4, 2009.

== Honours ==
=== Club ===
Shandong Luneng

- Chinese Super League: 2006, 2008, 2010
- Chinese FA Cup: 2004, 2006, 2014
- Chinese Super League Cup: 2004

=== Individual ===
- CFA Young Player of the Year: 2003
