= Liu Yunfei =

Chinese footballer

Liu Yunfei 刘云飞
Personal information
- Date of birth: 8 May 1979 (age 47)
- Place of birth: Tianjin, China
- Height: 1.83 m (6 ft 0 in)
- Position: Goalkeeper

Team information
- Current team: Foshan Nanshi (goalkeeping coach)

Youth career
- 1996–1998: Tianjin TEDA

Senior career*
Years	Team	Apps	(Gls)
1999–2005	Tianjin TEDA	109	(0)
2006–2007	Shanghai Shenhua	5	(0)
2021-2022	Shaanxi Warriors Beyond		

International career^{‡}
2002–2005	China	27	(0)

Managerial career
- 2021-2022: Shaanxi Warriors Beyond (goalkeeping)
- 2025-: Foshan Nanshi (goalkeeping)
Medal record
Representing China
Men's football
AFC Asian Cup
Silver medal – second place	2004 China	Team
East Asian Football Championship
Bronze medal – third place	2003 Japan	Team
Gold medal – first place	2005 South Korea	Team
- * Club domestic league appearances and goals as of 14 April 2008 ‡ National team caps and goals as of 14 April 2008

Liu Yunfei (simplified Chinese: 刘云飞; traditional Chinese: 劉雲飛; pinyin: Liú Yúnfēi; born 8 May 1979) is a Chinese former international football goalkeeper. Internationally he played within the 2004 AFC Asian Cup; however, at the height of his career he was disciplined by his club for his recreational drug use before being arrested for possessing illegal drugs, which saw him retire in 2007 at the age of only 27. On April 15, 2021, Liu decided to return to the field aged 42.

== Biography ==
Liu started his career playing for the Tianjin TEDA youth team and was soon called up to the Chinese U23, where he competed with his Tianjin teammate Zong Lei for the first-choice goalkeeping spot. After returning from national duty, his development soon saw him replace Jiang Jin as the club's first-choice goalkeeper within the 2001 Chinese Jia-A League season after he made 19 league appearances for the club. His breakout season saw him personally win the Jia A goalkeeper of the year award in 2001, while Jiang Jin decided to move to Shanghai Zhongyuan in 2002.

Liu was soon called up to Chinese senior team on February 15, 2002 by the Chinese Head coach Bora Milutinović in a friendly against Slovenia in a 0-0 draw. While he missed out on the 2002 FIFA World Cup, Liu soon went on to establish himself as his country's first-choice goalkeeper once Arie Haan became manager for China, and once the 2004 AFC Asian Cup came around, Liu became the hero in the semi-final penalty shootout against Iran as China won 4-3 on penalties.

Liu transferred to top tier side Shanghai Shenhua in 2006, where his teammate in the national team Yu Weiliang was a starter goalkeeper. He started a few games, but was suspended later for discipline problems thought to be brought about by his recreational drug use. After he stopped training Liu soon became a free agent after the contract with Shanghai Shenhua was terminated. In March 2007, Liu was arrested for possessing illegal drugs, so he retired at only age 27.

On 17 October 2025, Liu was appointed as the goalkeeping coach of China League One club Foshan Nanshi.

== Honours ==
Individual Chinese Jia-A League Goalkeeper of the Year: 2001
