= Li Yan (footballer, born 1980) =

Chinese footballer

Li Yan 李彦
Personal information
- Date of birth: 20 June 1980 (age 46)
- Place of birth: Shanghai, China
- Height: 1.83 m (6 ft 0 in)
- Position: Midfielder

Senior career*
Years	Team	Apps	(Gls)
1998	Shanghai HSBC		
1999–2006	Shanghai Pudong	121	(25)
2006	New Zealand Knights	2	(0)
2007–2009	Shaanxi Baorong Chanba	76	(5)
2010–2011	Hangzhou Greentown	32	(2)

International career^{‡}
2005–2011	China	17	(1)
Medal record
Representing China
Men's football
EAFF Championship
Gold medal – first place	2005 South Korea	Team
Bronze medal – third place	2008 China	Team
- * Club domestic league appearances and goals as of 21 June 2011 ‡ National team caps and goals as of 21 June 2011

Li Yan (Chinese: 李彦) (born June 20, 1980) is a former Chinese international football midfielder who spent the majority of his career playing for Shanghai Pudong where he won the second tier division title and a runners-up position in the 2003 Chinese Jia-A League season. He also played for New Zealand Knights and Hangzhou Greentown before retiring due to injury.

== Club career ==
While Li Yan started his football career at second tier side Shanghai HSBC, it was his move to Shanghai Pudong that saw his football career flourish when he would go on to establish himself as an integral member within the team that would go on to win the second division title and receive promotion to the top tier. He would go on to help establish the team in the top flight and remained with the club when they moved to Xi'an and renamed itself Xi'an Chanba International. During this period Li Yan established himself as useful attacking midfielder and caught the eye of New Zealand Knights in 2006, however his move was to prove an unsuccessful one and he only played in two league games. Li Yan would return to Xian Chanba International which had renamed itself Shaanxi Baorong Chanba in the 2007 season and stayed with them until the end of the 2009 league season when he transferred to Hangzhou Greentown in 2010. His move to Hangzhou would see him become an immediate regular within the team and he helped guide the club to their best ever finish of fourth within the league as well qualification for the AFC Champions League for the first time. Li would, however sustain an ankle injury at the beginning of the 2011 league season and tried to play on until April 19, 2011 in a 2011 AFC Champions League group game against Al Ain saw him unable to carry on, which would see him retire soon afterwards.

== International career ==
Li Yan would make his debut in a friendly against Republic of Ireland March 29, 2005 in a 1–0 defeat. He would go on to establish himself as a squad regular within the team and score his first goal against Korea DPR in a 2–0 win. Li Yan, however did not make it into the squad that went to the 2007 AFC Asian Cup and after the tournament saw very little international playing time.

== Honours ==
=== Club ===
Shanghai Pudong

- Chinese Jia-B League: 2001

=== International ===
China national football team

- East Asian Football Championship: 2005
