= Li Weifeng =

Chinese footballer (born 1978)

Li Weifeng 李玮锋
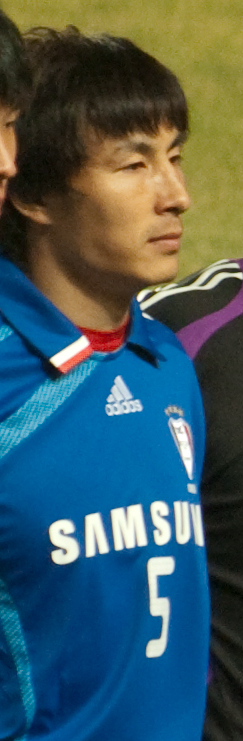
- Weifeng with Suwon Bluewings in 2009

Personal information
- Full name: Li Weifeng
- Date of birth: 1 December 1978 (age 47)
- Place of birth: Changchun, Jilin, China
- Height: 1.82 m (5 ft 11 1/2 in)
- Position: Centre-back

Youth career
- 1990–1995: Tianjin Locomotive
- 1996–1998: Shenzhen Youth
- 1998: Tianjin Locomotive

Senior career*
Years	Team	Apps	(Gls)
1998–2005	Shenzhen Ping'an	151	(8)
2002–2003	→ Everton (loan)	1	(0)
2006–2008	Shanghai Shenhua	49	(8)
2008	Wuhan Guanggu	2	(0)
2009–2010	Suwon Bluewings	48	(2)
2011–2015	Tianjin Teda	105	(3)

International career^{‡}
2008	China Olympic (O.P.)	3	(0)
1998–2011	China	112	(14)

Managerial career
- 2015–2019: Tianjin Quanjian (deputy general manager)
- 2016–2019: Tianjin Quanjian (team manager)
- 2019–2020: Tianjin Tianhai
- 2022–2023: Guangzhou City
- 2023–2024: Henan FC (managing director)
- 2026: Ningbo FC
Medal record
Men's football
Representing China
AFC Asian Cup
Silver medal – second place	2004 China	Team
Asian Games
Bronze medal – third place	1998 Bangkok	Football
East Asian Football Championship
Bronze medal – third place	2003 Japan	Team
Gold medal – first place	2005 South Korea	Team
Bronze medal – third place	2008 China	Team
- * Club domestic league appearances and goals as of 3 November 2014 ‡ National team caps and goals as of 15 November 2011

Li Weifeng (simplified Chinese: 李玮峰; traditional Chinese: 李瑋峰; pinyin: Lǐ Wěifēng; born 1 December 1978) is a Chinese football manager and former footballer. He made 112 appearances for the China national team, scoring 14 goals.

== Club career ==
=== Tianjin Locomotive ===
Li Weifeng started his football career with Tianjin Locomotive's youth academy before he was spotted by the Chinese national youth program to study football abroad in a training program sponsored by Jianlibao. This then saw him called up to the Chinese under-20 national team and given a chance to play in the 1997 FIFA World Youth Championship.

==== Loan to Everton ====
Upon his return from the tournament, Li was returned to his initial youth team of Tianjin Locomotive until top tier club Shenzhen Ping'an showed an interest in him, not wanting to lose a promising young player a contract dispute would arise until a fee of 800,000 yuan was reportedly agree upon. In the 1998 league season he made his debut for the club and quickly established himself at the heart of the team's defense, guiding them to a 12th-place finish and doing enough to avoid relegation. In the following seasons with Shenzhen, Li establish himself as an integral member of the team and would go on to represent his country in the 2002 FIFA World Cup. With the exposure of the tournament, a short trial at Premier League side Everton immediately followed as part of an Everton deal with Chinese sponsor Kejian. His time at Everton he only made two appearances, playing once in the league against Southampton and once in the League Cup against Wrexham. He was unable to make an impact at the club and returned to Shenzhen after the 2002-03 season.

In the 2003 league season, Li returned from his loan spell at Everton and was immediately incorporated back into the team. He was soon made club captain by then manager Zhu Guanghu and within his second spell at the club he would lead them to the 2004 Chinese Super League title for the first time in the club's history. After that success, Zhu Guanghu was offered the Chinese Head coach position and Chi Shangbin came in as his replacement. Unfortunately for Chi, results significantly deteriorated under his reign and Li along with several other members of the team in Li Yi and Yang Chen publicly criticized his management which resulted in his resignation.

=== Shanghai Shenghua ===
In the beginning of the 2006 season, Li left Shenzhen due to the club's financial difficulties and followed many of his teammates out of the club. Shanghai Shenhua bought him for 6 million yuan despite reported interest from Serie A side Fiorentina.

=== Wuhan Guanggu ===
In 2008, Li transferred from Shanghai to Wuhan Guanggu due to a lack of playing time for the league runners-up, reuniting him with his former manager Zhu Guanghu who also coached him in the Chinese national team as well as in Shenzhen. Soon after the transfer, Li was involved in an on-the-field scuffle with Lu Jiang which resulted in him being suspended for eight games by the Chinese Football Association. Already on the verge of relegation, Wuhan amounted protests against this ruling which the club deemed to be unjust and extremely damaging to its chance to survive in the top flight. After its efforts were proven to be futile, Wuhan withdrew from the league and was disbanded and Li did not appear in any games for the rest of the season.

=== Suwon Samsung Bluewings ===
Because of Wuhan's withdrawal, most of its non-local and highly paid players were put on the transfer list at the end of the season, with Li among them. Because of his reputation, high wage demands, gigantic transfer fee, and the unserved eight-game suspension, Li was a hard commodity to move despite being perceived as heads and shoulders above the rest of the Chinese defenders. But the new AFC Champions League rule came to his rescue as it allowed all tournament participants to have one foreign Asian player. Attracting heavy interest from both the Japanese and Korean leagues, Li moved to K-League side Suwon Samsung Bluewings in January 2009, signing a two-year contract for a reported $400,000 and reuniting him with another one of his former managers. Some pundits suggested that Li moved on a free transfer because Wuhan's withdrawal made all of its players free agents under FIFA's rules. However, Wuhan immediately released statements announcing its intention to obstruct the move if it was not at least partly remunerated and media reports stated that Li would pay his former club himself in order to play for the Korean outfit. In his debut appearance, he was sent off against Sparta Prague in a friendly match in Hong Kong; however, Li redeemed himself in his first official match for Suwon in an AFC Champions League match in a 4-1 win against Kashima Antlers by scoring the opening goal.

=== Tianjin Teda ===
On 18 January 2011, Li signed with Chinese Super League side Tianjin Teda and was named as the club captain. On 20 July 2015, Li was released by the club midway through the 2015 season.

=== Tongji University ===
In 2015, Li joined Tongji University in Shanghai before retiring at the end of the year.

== International career ==
Li made his first appearance for the Chinese national team on 22 November 1998 in a friendly match against South Korea, which ended in a 0-0 draw. His performances for the national team would see him called up to China's squads for the 2000 AFC Asian Cup and 2002 FIFA World Cup. In 2003, he was promoted to team captain by then manager Arie Haan and would lead China to a runners-up position at the 2004 AFC Asian Cup. In September 2006, he was banned from the national team for attacking an opposing player and hence earning his sixth red card in fourteen months during an AFC Champions League game with Shanghai Shenhua. His position as captain of the national team was stripped and later assigned to Zheng Zhi. The ban was removed after a year, but since then he never had any significant role in the national team anymore. He returned as Captain during the 2014 World Cup qualifying, but his return could not help China pass through the Third Round, after two shocking losses to Iraq.

== Managerial career ==
Li was appointed as the vice managing director of Tianjin Quanjian in September 2015.

On 10 April 2026, Li was named as the head coach of China League One club Ningbo FC. On 9 October 2026, the club announced that Li has left his position.

== Career statistics ==
=== Club ===
Appearances and goals by club, season and competition
Club	Season	League			National cup (Note: Includes Chinese FA Cup, FA Cup, Korean FA Cup.)		League cup (Note: Includes Chinese Super League Cup, Football League Cup, K-League Cup.)		Continental		Total	
Club	Season	Division	Apps	Goals	Apps	Goals	Apps	Goals	Apps	Goals	Apps	Goals
Shenzhen Ping'an	1998	Chinese Jia-A League	11	2	0	0	–		–		11	2
Shenzhen Ping'an	1999	Chinese Jia-A League	23	1	0	0	–		–		23	1
Shenzhen Ping'an	2000	Chinese Jia-A League	24	0			–		–		24	0
Shenzhen Ping'an	2001	Chinese Jia-A League	24	1	0	0	–		–		24	1
Shenzhen Ping'an	2002	Chinese Jia-A League	10	0	0	0	–		–		10	0
Shenzhen Ping'an	Total		92	4	0	0	0	0	0	0	92	4
Everton	2002-03	Premier League	1	0	0	0	1	0	–		2	0
Shenzhen Jianlibao	2003	Chinese Jia-A League	24	3	3	0	–		–		27	3
Shenzhen Jianlibao	2004	Chinese Super League	13	1	3	0	1	0	–		17	1
Shenzhen Jianlibao	2005	Chinese Super League	22	0	2	0	6	0	5	0	35	0
Shenzhen Jianlibao	Total		59	4	8	0	7	0	5	0	79	4
Shanghai Shenhua	2006	Chinese Super League	27	4	2	1	–		3	0	32	5
Shanghai Shenhua	2007	Chinese Super League	22	4	–		–		2	0	24	4
Shanghai Shenhua	2008	Chinese Super League	0	0	–		–		–		0	0
Shanghai Shenhua	Total		49	8	2	1	0	0	5	0	56	9
Wuhan Guanggu	2008	Chinese Super League	2	0	–		–		–		2	0
Suwon Bluewings	2009	K-League	24	1	5	1	2	0	5	2	36	4
Suwon Bluewings	2010	K-League	24	1	5	0	5	0	9	0	43	1
Suwon Bluewings	Total		48	2	10	1	7	0	14	2	79	5
Tianjin Teda	2011	Chinese Super League	24	1	3	0	–		7	0	34	1
Tianjin Teda	2012	Chinese Super League	28	0	1	0	–		5	0	34	0
Tianjin Teda	2013	Chinese Super League	27	1	1	0	–		–		28	1
Tianjin Teda	2014	Chinese Super League	19	1	1	0	–		–		20	1
Tianjin Teda	2015	Chinese Super League	7	0	0	0	–		–		7	0
Tianjin Teda	Total		105	3	6	0	0	0	12	0	123	3
Career total			356	21	26	2	15	0	36	2	433	25

=== International ===
Scores and results list China's goal tally first, score column indicates score after each Li goal.

List of international goals scored by Li Weifeng
No.	Date	Venue	Opponent	Score	Result	Competition
1	12 December 1998	Bangkok, Thailand	Oman	5–0	6–1	1998 Asian Games
2	26 January 2000	Ho Chi Minh City, Vietnam	Guam	4–0	19–0	2000 AFC Asian Cup qualification
3	3 September 2000	Shanghai, China	Iraq	1–0	4–1	2000 Four Nations Tournament
4	3 September 2000	Shanghai, China	Iraq	3–1	4–1	2000 Four Nations Tournament
5	22 April 2001	Xi'an, China	Maldives	10–1	10–1	2002 FIFA World Cup qualification
6	13 May 2001	Kunming, China	Indonesia	1–1	5–1	2002 FIFA World Cup qualification
7	7 September 2001	Doha, Qatar	Qatar	1–1	1–1	2002 FIFA World Cup qualification
8	15 September 2001	Shenyang, China	Uzbekistan	1–0	2–0	2002 FIFA World Cup qualification
9	16 February 2003	Wuhan, China	Estonia	1–0	1–0	Friendly
10	17 November 2004	Guangzhou, China	Hong Kong	7–0	7–0	2006 FIFA World Cup qualification
11	22 February 2006	Guangzhou, China	Palestine	2–0	2–0	2007 AFC Asian Cup qualification
12	21 October 2007	Foshan, China	Myanmar	7–0	7–0	2010 FIFA World Cup qualification
13	25 May 2008	Kunshan, China	Jordan	2–0	2–0	Friendly
14	15 November 2011	Singapore	Singapore	2–0	4–0	2014 FIFA World Cup qualification

== Honours ==
Shenzhen Ping'an

- Chinese Super League: 2004

Shanghai Shenhua

- A3 Champions Cup: 2007

Suwon Bluewings

- Korean FA Cup: 2009

Tianjin Teda

- Chinese FA Cup: 2011

China

- East Asian Football Championship: 2005

Individual

- Chinese Super League Team of the Year: 1999, 2001, 2003, 2004

== See also ==
- List of men's footballers with 100 or more international caps
