= Ji Mingyi =

Chinese footballer

Ji Mingyi 季铭义
Personal information
- Date of birth: December 15, 1980 (age 45)
- Place of birth: Dalian, Liaoning, China
- Height: 1.84 m (6 ft 0 in)
- Position: Defender

Senior career*
| Years | Team | Apps | (Gls) |
| 1998–2007 | Dalian Shide | 192 | (3) |
| 2008–2009 | Chengdu Blades | 45 | (0) |
| 2017 | Hainan Boying | 9 | (0) |

International career^{‡}
| 2003–2007 | China | 20 | (0) |
Medal record
Representing China
Men's football
AFC Asian Cup
| Silver medal – second place | 2004 China | Team |
East Asian Football Championship
| Bronze medal – third place | 2003 Japan | Team |
| Gold medal – first place | 2005 South Korea | Team |
- * Club domestic league appearances and goals as of 14 October 2017 ‡ National team caps and goals as of 16 October 2012

Ji Mingyi (simplified Chinese: 季铭义; traditional Chinese: 季銘義; pinyin: Jì Míngyì; born December 15, 1980, in Dalian) is a Chinese footballer. He spent the majority of his career with Dalian Shide where he won four league titles and two Chinese FA Cups.

== Club career ==
Ji Mingyi started his career with Dalian Shide in 1999 where he quickly made an impact within the team establishing himself with 21 appearances in his first season. Injecting fresh blood into the dominant Dalian team, during his career with Dalian he won four league titles and two Chinese FA Cups. After nine seasons with Dalian where he was eventually named captain he transferred to the newly promoted Chengdu Blades. At his new club he would immediately establish himself as vital player within the team for the next two seasons until at the end of the 2009 Chinese Super League campaign it was discovered that the club had fixed a game during their promotion to the Chinese Super League and were subsequently relegated as punishment.

With the club unable to hold on to Ji, there was speculation that he would join Korean K League side Jeju United FC, however this fell through and he decided to retire from the game. Ji failed to pass the trail with newly established club Dalian Transcendence in 2014. He became the assistant coach of Dalian Yifang as well as the head coach of reserve team of the club. Ji returned to professional football in January 2017, joining China League Two club Hainan Boying as player and general manager.

== International career ==
Ji Mingyi was named in the 2004 AFC Asian Cup where he was selected as back up for Zhang Yaokun and Zheng Zhi in central defence as China came runners-up within the tournament. Throughout Ji Mingyi international career he has continued to be a reserve choice in defence, the following 2007 AFC Asian Cup he was again selected in the squad however did not play any games.

== Career statistics ==
Last update: 14 October 2017

| Season | Team | Country | Division | Apps | Goals |
|---|---|---|---|---|---|
| 1999 | Dalian Shide | China | 1 | 21 | 0 |
| 2000 | Dalian Shide | China | 1 | 26 | 0 |
| 2001 | Dalian Shide | China | 1 | 24 | 2 |
| 2002 | Dalian Shide | China | 1 | 11 | 0 |
| 2003 | Dalian Shide | China | 1 | 23 | 0 |
| 2004 | Dalian Shide | China | 1 | 18 | 0 |
| 2005 | Dalian Shide | China | 1 | 26 | 0 |
| 2006 | Dalian Shide | China | 1 | 24 | 1 |
| 2007 | Dalian Shide | China | 1 | 9 | 0 |
| 2008 | Chengdu Blades | China | 1 | 24 | 0 |
| 2009 | Chengdu Blades | China | 1 | 21 | 0 |
| 2017 | Hainan Boying | China | 3 | 9 | 0 |

== Honours ==
Dalian Shide

- Chinese Jia-A League/Chinese Super League: 2000, 2001, 2002, 2005
- Chinese FA Cup: 2001, 2005
