= Shu Chang (footballer) =

Chinese footballer

Shu Chang 舒畅
Personal information
- Full name: Shu Chang
- Date of birth: February 24, 1977 (age 49)
- Place of birth: Qingdao, Shandong, China
- Height: 1.83 m (6 ft 0 in)
- Position: Defender

Senior career*
Years	Team	Apps	(Gls)
1996–2010	Shandong Luneng	273	(20)

International career^{‡}
2000–2004	China	11	(0)
Medal record
Men's football
Representing China
Asian Games
Bronze medal – third place	1998 Bangkok	Football
- * Club domestic league appearances and goals as of March 2010 ‡ National team caps and goals as of March 2010

Shu Chang (simplified Chinese: 舒畅; traditional Chinese: 舒暢; pinyin: Shū Chàng; born February 24, 1977) is a former Chinese football defender who played his entire career with Shandong Luneng. He was the captain of the club, which he has led to two China Super League titles in 2006 and 2008.

== Club career ==
Shu started his career in 1996 with Shandong Luneng where in his first season he would make 3 league appearances, which was then followed by a further 7 the following season. Under the Shandong Luneng Head coach Yin Tiesheng he would gradually establish himself as reliable central defender within the team, however it was the introduction of Slobodan Santrač as the team's new Head coach that saw Shu become a prominent member with the club that would win the league and cup double in the 1999 league season. Even after Santrač left Shu had firmly established himself as one of their most consistent players and would go on to become the club's captain that oversaw them through some of their most successful periods in their history by winning several further league and cup trophies. After over a decade of consistency Shu would spend much of the 2009 league season on the bench due to injury. When he returned near the end of the season Liu Jindong would become the team captain and when the 2010 league started he was given a reserved position within the team with Liu remaining as captain.

== International career ==
Shu was given his chance to impress the Chinese Head coach Bora Milutinović in a friendly against Hong Kong on April 25, 2000, in a 1–0 victory. This was met with several further friendlies, however Shu found himself a fringe player within the team and was not called up to the 2000 AFC Asian Cup squad that went to Lebanon. After the tournament he was given another chance to claim a spot within the team for qualification for the 2002 FIFA World Cup, however in the final friendly before the qualifiers China were defeated 3-0 to Sweden on February 17, 2001, and Shu was dropped from the squad. After several years out of the team Shu was given another chance to play for China when Chinese Head coach Arie Haan played him in a friendly against Finland on February 3, 2004, in a game China won 2-1, however this was to prove to be his last game for the team.

== Honours ==
Shandong Luneng

- Chinese Jia-A League/Chinese Super League: 1999, 2006, 2008
- Chinese FA Cup: 1999, 2004, 2006
- Chinese Super League Cup: 2004
