= 2005 East Asian Football Championship =

Football tournament

Tournament details
- Host country: South Korea
- Dates: 5–13 March, 2005 (Preliminary); 31 July – 7 August, 2005 (Finals)
- Teams: 9 (from 1 confederation)
- Venues: 4 (in 4 host cities)

Final positions
- Champions: China (1st title)
- Runners-up: Japan
- Third place: North Korea
- Fourth place: South Korea

Tournament statistics
- Matches played: 16
- Goals scored: 81 (5.06 per match)
- Best player: (China) Ji Mingyi
- Best goalkeeper: (South Korea) Lee Woon-jae

The 2005 EAFF East Asian Football Championship was a football competition between teams from East Asian countries and territories held from 31 July to 7 August 2005 in South Korea, with the qualifiers held in Taiwan in March 2005.

China PR, South Korea, and Japan were the automatic finalists. The fourth finalist spot was competed among North Korea, Guam, Hong Kong, Chinese Taipei, and Mongolia. North Korea was the winner in the qualifiers.

== Participating teams ==
=== Preliminary ===
- Chinese Taipei
- Guam
- Hong Kong
- Mongolia
- North Korea

=== Finals ===
- China – 2003 East Asian Football Championship third place
- North Korea – Winners of the preliminary competition
- Japan – 2006 FIFA World Cup participant
- South Korea – 2006 FIFA World Cup participant

== Venues ==
=== Preliminary competition ===
Taipei
Zhongshan Soccer Stadium
Capacity: 20,000

=== Final Tournament ===
Daejeon	Jeonju	Daegu
Daejeon World Cup Stadium	Jeonju World Cup Stadium	Daegu World Cup Stadium
Capacity: 40,535	Capacity: 42,477	Capacity: 66,422

== Preliminary competition ==
=== Matches ===
Macau was suspended by FIFA from entering the competition during the match period. Each countries played against the other 4 countries on a round robin basis.

Team	Pld	W	D	L	GF	GA	GD	Pts
North Korea	4	4	0	0	31	0	+31	12
Hong Kong	4	3	0	1	26	2	+24	9
Chinese Taipei	4	1	1	2	9	7	+2	4
Mongolia	4	1	1	2	4	13	–9	4
Guam	4	0	0	4	1	49	–48	0

All times are local time, National Standard Time (UTC+08:00)

2005-03-05
14:00

Chinese Taipei	9–0	Guam
Tu Ming-feng 8'; Kuo Yin-hong 10', 20', 69'; Chiang Shih-lu 56', 70'; He Ming-chan 66', 83', 90+3'	Report

Zhongshan Soccer Stadium, Taipei
2005-03-05
16:30

Hong Kong	6–0	Mongolia
Chu Siu Kei 30'; Law Chun Bong 48'; Wong Chun Yue 50'; Lam Ka Wai 73'; Chan Yiu Lun 90+2', 90+3'	Report

Zhongshan Soccer Stadium, Taipei

2005-03-07
14:00

Guam	0–15	Hong Kong
	Report	Chan Wai Ho 1'; Chan Siu Ki 8', 18', 28', 30', 36', 42', 87'; Chan Yiu Lun 16', 31'; Wong Chun Yue 24', 43', 45'; Chu Siu Kei 67'; Poon Man Tik 89'

Zhongshan Soccer Stadium, Taipei
2005-03-07
16:30

North Korea	6–0	Mongolia
Kim Kwang-hyok 18', 39', 66'; Ri Hyok-chol 22', 30'; Hong Yong-jo 64'	Report

Zhongshan Soccer Stadium, Taipei

2005-03-09
14:00

Chinese Taipei	0–2	North Korea
	Report	Choe Chol-man 13', 14'

Zhongshan Soccer Stadium, Taipei
2005-03-09
16:30

Mongolia	4–1	Guam
Ganbaatar 31', 34'; Davaa 46'; Bold 81'	Report	Pangelinan 69'

Zhongshan Soccer Stadium, Taipei

2005-03-11
14:00

Chinese Taipei	0–5	Hong Kong
	Report	Chan Yiu Lun 7', 45'; Lam Ka Wai 19'; Poon Yiu Cheuk 59'; Cheung Sai Ho 61'

Zhongshan Soccer Stadium, Taipei
2005-03-11
16:30

Guam	0–21	North Korea
	Report	Hong Yong-jo 6', 17'; Choe Chol-man 10', 37', 54'; Kim Kwang-hyok 21', 43', 61', 63', 71', 76', 77'; Kim Yong-jun 29', 39', 49'; Kang Jin-hyok 31', 44', 65', 84', 90+1'; Pak Nam-chol 83'

Zhongshan Soccer Stadium, Taipei

2005-03-13
14:00

Hong Kong	0–2	North Korea
	Report	Kang Jin-hyok 43'; Ri Myong-sam 64'

Zhongshan Soccer Stadium, Taipei
2005-03-13
16:30

Chinese Taipei	0–0	Mongolia
	Report

Zhongshan Soccer Stadium, Taipei

=== Personal Awards ===
Best Goalkeeper	Best Defender	Top Scorer	Most Valuable Player	Fairplay Award
(Hong Kong) Fan Chun Yip	(North Korea) Jang Sok-chol	(North Korea) Kim Kwang-hyok	(North Korea) Kim Yong-jun	Mongolia

== Final tournament ==
=== Matches ===
The final tournament started on 31 July 2005. China won their first ever international title. The next tournament was scheduled for 2008.

Pos	Team	Pld	W	D	L	GF	GA	GD	Pts	Result
1	China (C)	3	1	2	0	5	3	+2	5	Champions
2	Japan	3	1	1	1	3	3	0	4	Runners-up
3	North Korea	3	1	1	1	1	2	−1	4	Third place
4	South Korea (H)	3	0	2	1	1	2	−1	2	Fourth place

Source: EAFF.com
(C) Champions; (H) Hosts
2005-07-31

South Korea	1–1	China
Kim Jin-kyu 73'	Report	Sun Xiang 52'

Daejeon World Cup Stadium, Daejeon
2005-07-31

North Korea	1–0	Japan
Kim Yong-jun 27'	Report

Daejeon World Cup Stadium, Daejeon

2005-08-03

Japan	2–2	China
Moniwa 59'; T. Tanaka 87'	Report	Li Jinyu 37'; Zhang Yonghai 43'

Daejeon World Cup Stadium, Daejeon

2005-08-04

South Korea	0–0	North Korea
	Report

Jeonju World Cup Stadium, Jeonju

2005-08-07

China	2–0	North Korea
Li Yan 13'; Xie Hui 65'	Report

Daegu World Cup Stadium, Daegu
2005-08-07

South Korea	0–1	Japan
	Report	Nakazawa 86'

Daegu World Cup Stadium, Daegu

=== Personal awards ===
Best Goalkeeper	Best Defender	Most Valuable Player	Fair Play Award
(South Korea) Lee Woon-jae	(China) Zhang Yaokun	(China) Ji Mingyi	Japan

== Final standings ==
Rank	Team
1	China
2	Japan
3	North Korea
4	South Korea
5	Hong Kong
6	Chinese Taipei
7	Mongolia
8	Guam
