= Zhu Guanghu =

Chinese football coach and former player

Zhu Guanghu 朱广沪
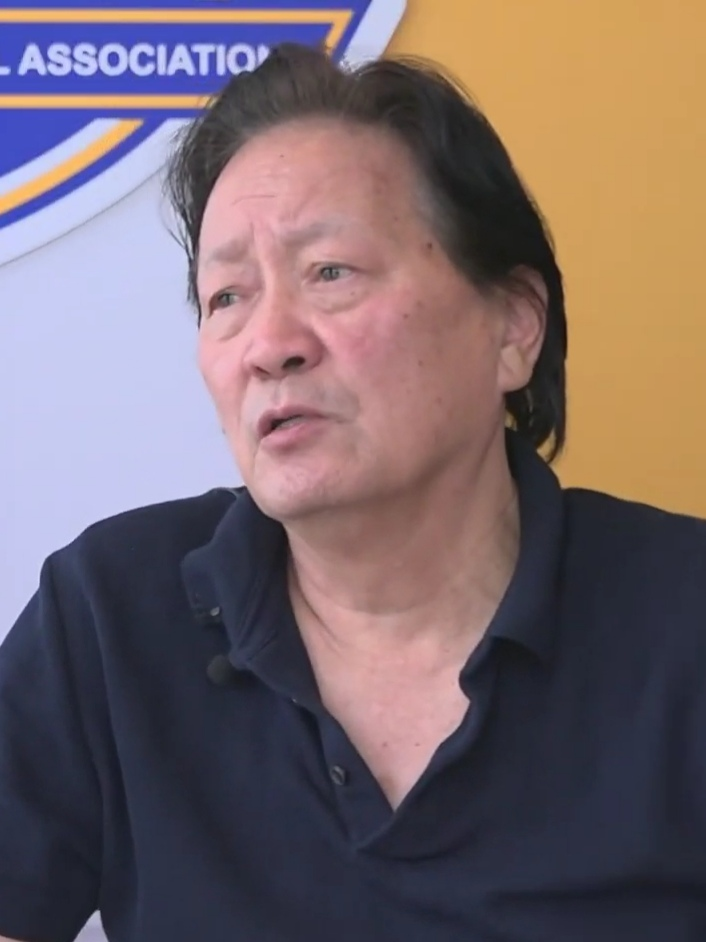

Personal information
- Date of birth: 25 September 1949 (age 77)
- Place of birth: Shanghai, China
- Height: 1.76 m (5 ft 9 in)
- Position: Midfielder

Senior career*
Years	Team	Apps	(Gls)
1961–1972	Bayi Football Team		
1972–1980	Shanghai Football Team		

Managerial career
- 1980–1984: Shanghai junior youth team
- 1985–1992: China junior youth team
- 1993–1998: Jianlibao youth team
- 1998–1999: China (Assistant)
- 2000–2005: Shenzhen Jianlibao
- 2005–2007: China
- 2008: Wuhan Guanggu
- 2009–2010: Shaanxi Chanba
- * Club domestic league appearances and goals

Zhu Guanghu (simplified Chinese: 朱广沪; traditional Chinese: 朱廣滬; pinyin: Zhū Guǎnghù; born 25 September 1949, in Shanghai, China) is a Chinese football coach and a former player. As a player, he was predominantly remembered for his time at Shanghai Football Team before going into management where he started off as a youth coach before becoming an assistant. He would get his chance at being a Head coach with Shenzhen Jianlibao where he won the 2004 Chinese Super League title. He would receive recognition for this accomplishment with the China national team position before leaving on 22 August 2007. Since then he has gone on to manage Wuhan Guanggu and Shaanxi Chanba.

== Playing career ==
Zhu Guanghu would play as a midfielder for the top tier club Shanghai Football Team. He played for the national B team on some occasions, but was never a top national player.

== Management career ==
He chose to coach after retiring as a player and became more known to the public when the Jianlibao youth team, a sponsored Chinese youth team to study and play in Brazil, returned to China in 1998. The team produced promising future stars such as Li Jinyu and Li Tie. Later, Zhu joined the China national football team and served as an assistant to the English head coach, Bobby Houghton. The team then later failed to qualify for the Olympic football tournament. Houghton was replaced by Bora Milutinovic and Zhu left to coach the Shenzhen Football Team.

On 9 March 2005, the Chinese Football Association named the Zhu Guanghu as the successor of the Dutch coach, Arie Haan. Earlier in 2004, Mr. Haan's contract expired as the result of his failure to lead the China national football team into qualification for the Football World Cup 2006. Zhu's appointment was due to his success in the Chinese Super League with Shenzhen Jianlibao Football Club by winning the league's first championship. Other factors also attributed to Zhu's appointment. As a native, Zhu was expected to accept a much lower wage package than a foreign coach and there would be no language barrier. A number of people, including FIFA president Sepp Blatter suggested that a native coach would have better communication with the players.

Zhu's short-term goal was to look for talented players and organize a new national football team. His ultimate goal was to lead the China national football team to qualify for the 2010 Football World Cup in South Africa.

In 2005, under Zhu's coach, the China national football team won the East Asian Cup, recording two draws (against South Korea and Japan) and one win (against North Korea). The title, though having not much significance, was the first official championship won by the China national football team.

Zhu has been criticized for his style of play, which tends to be over-defensive, according to some. Many fans of the national team have called for his resignation due to the team's decline in the FIFA World Rankings and several poor performances. On 18 March 2007, fans attacked his car while he was leaving a CSL match, which he had watched. They verbally insulted him, and the referee of that match who was with him was physically assaulted.

In the 2007 AFC Asian Cup, just needing a draw in the last match, the Chinese side conceded three goals from free-kicks in the closing stage of the game against Uzbekistan. The first time not to qualify for the second round in 27 years, Zhu is strongly criticized for his tactics and submitted his resignation shortly after.

On 5 August, it was confirmed that after a three-month negotiation, Zhu was expected take the position of manager at Shenzhen Asia Travel again that weekend before the match against Guangzhou GPC. But on 31 August 2009, he signed a three-year contract with Shaanxi Chanba, succeeding newly resigned Cheng Yaodong.

== Honours ==
=== Manager ===
Shenzhen Jianlibao

- Chinese Super League: 2004

== Filmography ==
Zhu Guanghu has acted in at least four films since 1980.

Year	English title	Original title	Role	Notes
1980	Ace! Soccer	飞吧，足球！	Ding	
1981	Spring and Autumn in a Small Town	小城春秋	Bei Xun	
1982	Morning Song	晨曲	Swimming coach	
2015	Magic Card	魔卡行动	Scorekeeper	

== See also ==
- Sport in China
- Football in China
- China national under-23 football team
- China women's national football team
