= 2013 Shanghai Shenxin F.C. season =

Shanghai Shenxin 2013
- Chairman: Xu Guoliang 徐国良
- Manager: Zhu Jiong 朱炯
- Super League: 12th
- FA Cup: Fourth Round
- Top goalscorer: League: Kieza (7); All: Kieza (7)
- Highest home attendance: 11,532 vs Shanghai SIPG; 2 June 2013
- Lowest home attendance: 7,011 vs Liaoning Whowin; 6 April 2013
- Average home league attendance: 9,518
Home colours	Away colours	Third colours

The 2013 Shanghai Shenxin season is Shanghai Shenxin's 4th consecutive season in the Chinese Super League. They will also compete in the Chinese FA Cup starting in the third round.

== Players ==
=== First team squad ===
Updated 4 March 2013

Note: Flags indicate national team as defined under FIFA eligibility rules; some limited exceptions apply. Players may hold more than one non-FIFA nationality.

No.	Pos.	Nation	Player
1	GK	CHN	Wu Yansheng
3	DF	CHN	Zhao Zuojun (captain)
5	DF	CHN	Li Haozhen
6	DF	AUS	Michael Marrone
7	DF	CHN	Xu Wen
8	FW	BRA	Jaílton Paraíba
9	MF	CHN	Zhu Jiawei
10	FW	CHN	Wang Jiayu
11	MF	CHN	Jiang Zhipeng
13	MF	CHN	Ye Chongqiu
14	MF	CHN	Song Xingyi
15	GK	CHN	Lin Xiang
16	MF	CHN	Yu Tao
17	FW	CHN	Zou Zhongting
18	DF	CHN	Ge Zhen

No.	Pos.	Nation	Player
19	FW	BRA	Kieza
20	MF	CHN	Wang Yun
21	MF	CHN	Liu Junnan
22	GK	CHN	Zhu Jianmin
23	FW	BRA	Antônio Flávio
24	MF	CHN	Zhang Yudong
25	GK	CHN	Liu Dianzuo
26	MF	BRA	Johnny
27	MF	CHN	Yang Jiawei
28	DF	CHN	Sun Yifan
32	FW	CHN	Jiang Xiaochen
33	MF	CHN	Zhu Baojie
38	GK	CHN	Li Yangxin
39	DF	CHN	Zou Xiang

=== Reserve squad ===
Note: Flags indicate national team as defined under FIFA eligibility rules; some limited exceptions apply. Players may hold more than one non-FIFA nationality.

No.	Pos.	Nation	Player
41	DF	CHN	Wang Xiaoxing
42	DF	CHN	Wu Junxin
43	DF	CHN	Zhu Zhiling
44	DF	CHN	Zhang Hao
45	MF	CHN	Liu Wenzhi

No.	Pos.	Nation	Player
46	FW	CHN	Mai Jiajian
47	FW	CHN	Liu Wenxi
48	DF	CHN	Li Tong
49	MF	CHN	Ma Yujie

=== On loan ===
Note: Flags indicate national team as defined under FIFA eligibility rules; some limited exceptions apply. Players may hold more than one non-FIFA nationality.

No.	Pos.	Nation	Player
-	MF	CHN	Chen Zhizhao (at Corinthians until 31 December 2013)
-	MF	CHN	Wang Bo (at Hubei China-Kyle until 31 December 2013)

== Transfers ==
=== In ===
No.	Pos.	Player	Transferred from	Fee/notes	Date	Source
16	MF	(China) Yu Tao	(China) Shanghai Shenhua	Free	20 December 2012	申鑫官方宣布 申花队长于涛正式加盟合同为期三年
21	MF	(China) Liu Junnan	(China) Shanghai Shenhua	Free	20 December 2012	
6	DF	(Australia) Michael Marrone	(Australia) Melbourne Heart	Undisclosed	9 January 2013	Marrone set for move to China
18	MF	(China) Ge Zhen	(China) Guangdong Sunray Cave	Free	19 January 2013	
19	FW	(Brazil) Kieza	(Brazil) Náutico	Free	14 March 2013	

=== Out ===
No.	Pos.	Player	Transferred to	Fee/notes	Date	Source
2	MF	(Ivory Coast) Jonas Salley	(China) Guizhou Renhe	Free	20 December 2012	
23	DF	(China) Chen Jianlong	(China) Meizhou Kejia	Free	20 December 2012	

=== Loan out ===
No.	Pos.	Player	Loan To	Fee/notes	Date	Source
35	MF	(China) Chen Zhizhao	(Brazil) Corinthians	On loan to Corinthians until 31 December 2013	February 2012	"Zizao" é o novo reforço do Corinthians
6	MF	(China) Wang Bo	Hubei China-Kyle	On loan to Hubei China-Kyle	14 January 2013	华凯尔引进冲甲后首名内援 申鑫铁腰王博租借加盟

== Competitions ==
=== Chinese Super League ===
==== Results summary ====
Overall								Home						Away					
Pld	W	D	L	GF	GA	GD	Pts	W	D	L	GF	GA	GD	W	D	L	GF	GA	GD
28	9	7	12	28	41	−13	34	5	2	7	14	22	−8	4	5	5	14	19	−5

Last updated: 19 October 2013.
Source: [ World-Football.net]

==== Results by round ====
Round	1	2	3	4	5	6	7	8	9	10	11	12	13	14	15	16	17	18	19	20	21	22	23	24	25	26	27	28	29	30
Ground	A	H	A	H	A	H	H	A	A	A	H	A	A	H	A	H	A	H	A	H	A	H	A	H	H	H	A	H	A	H
Result	L	L	D	D	D	W	L	W	D	W	L	L	L	W	L	L	L	D	D	L	D	W	W	L	W	L	W	W		
Position	14	14	12	11	12	10	11	12	10	9	8	11	13	10	12	13	13	13	13	13	13	13	13	13	13	13	10	10		

Updated to match(es) played on 19 October 2013. Source: "Soccerway". Archived from the original on 9 February 2013.
A = Away; H = Home; W = Win; D = Draw; L = Loss

==== Results ====
8 March 2013 Round 1	Guangzhou Evergrande	5–1	Shanghai Shenxin	Tianhe Stadium
20:00	Young-Gwon Kim (yellow card) 30'; Conca 50'; Elkeson 61'; Gao Lin 63'; Elkeson 72'; Muriqui 88'	Summary	Yang Jiawei 89'	Attendance: 38,997; Referee: (China) Hai Tan

17 March 2013 Round 2	Shanghai Shenxin	0–1	Shanghai Shenhua	Jinshan Sports Centre
16:00	Zhu Baojie (yellow card) 15'; Xu Wen (red card) 77'	Summary	Toranzo 4'; Dai Lin (yellow card) 50'; Wang Shouting (yellow card) 73'	Attendance: 8,696; Referee: (Qatar) Abdulrahman Al Jassim

29 March 2013 Round 3	Jiangsu Sainty	2–2	Shanghai Shenxin	Nanjing Olympic Sports Center
19:40	Ji Xiang (yellow card) 17'; Tadjiev (yellow card) 20'; Salihi 58' (pen.); Eleílson (red card) 87'; Salihi 90+3'	Summary	Zhu Baojie (yellow card) 21'; Ye Chongqiu (yellow card) 23'; Liu Junnan 50'; Kieza 64' (pen.); Wang Jiayu (yellow card) 78'	Attendance: 22,357; Referee: (China) Xu Hang

6 April 2013 Round 4	Shanghai Shenxin	1–1	Liaoning Whowin	Yuanshen Stadium
19:45	Kieza 5'; Ye Chongqiu (yellow card) 15'; Liu Junnan (yellow card) 29'	Summary	Zheng Tao (yellow card) 72'; Zhang Jingyang (yellow card) 90+3'	Attendance: 7,011; Referee: (China) Ai Kun

14 April 2013 Round 5	Beijing Guoan	2–2	Shanghai Shenxin	Hongkou Football Stadium
19:35	Wang Shouting (yellow card) 51'; Al-Khatib 60'; Al-Khatib 78'; Xu Liang (yellow card) 83'; Zheng Kaimu (yellow card) 90+1'; Wang Dalei (yellow card) 90+2'	Summary	Johnny 4'; Jaílton Paraíba (yellow card) 52'; Flávio 66'; Kieza (yellow card) 83'	Attendance: 32,466; Referee: (China) Guo Baolong

21 April 2013 Round 6	Shanghai Shenxin	2–1	Hangzhou Greentown	Jinshan Sports Centre
19:45	Wang Yun 30'; Kieza 58'; Yu Tao (yellow card) 77'	Summary	Mazola (yellow card) 34'; Cao Xuan (yellow card) 65'; Wang Song 90' (pen.)	Attendance: 9,759; Referee: (China) Huang Yejun

4 May 2013 Round 7	Shanghai Shenxin	2–3	Shandong Luneng	Yuanshen Stadium
19:45	Kieza 25' (pen.); Wang Yun 45'; Wang Yun (yellow card) 36'; Ye Chongqiu (yellow card) 63'; Jailton Paraíba (yellow card) 80'	Summary	Yang Xu 2'; Wang Yongpo 20'; Zheng Zheng (yellow card) 34'; Wang Yongpo (yellow card) 40'; Cui Peng (yellow card) 46'; Yang Xu (yellow card) 61'; Zheng Zheng 69'; Wang Tong (red card) 76'	Attendance: 10,592; Referee: (Australia) Alan Milliner

11 May 2013 Round 8	Dalian Aerbin	1–2	Shanghai Shenxin	Jinzhou Stadium
19:35	Yu Dabao 79'; Jin Pengxiang (yellow card) 84'	Summary	Flávio (yellow card) 23'; Kieza 40'; Wang Jiayu (yellow card) 85'; Kieza 87'	Attendance: 10,389; Referee: (China) Hai Tan

18 May 2013 Round 9	Qingdao Jonoon	0–0	Shanghai Shenxin	Qingdao Tiantai Stadium
15:35	Li Peng (yellow card) 66'; Zhu Jianrong (yellow card) 79'	Summary	Zhu Baojie (yellow card) 58'	Attendance: 3,261; Referee: (China) Hai Tan

26 May 2013 Round 10	Changchun Yatai	1–3	Shanghai Shenxin	Development Area Stadium
15:35	Liu Weidong 5'; Lü Jianjun (yellow card) 30'	Summary	Wang Yun 30'; Wang Yun (yellow card) 37'; Kieza 62'; Wang Yun 66'; Yu Tao (yellow card) 73'; Liu Dianzuo (yellow card) 82'	Attendance: 12,131; Referee: (Japan) Koichiro Fukushima

2 June 2013 Round 11	Shanghai Shenxin	1–6	Shanghai SIPG	Yuanshen Stadium
19:45	Wang Yun 60'; Johnny (yellow card) 62'; Jiang Xiaochen (yellow card) 82'	Summary	Wu Lei 17'; Wu Lei 37'; Lü Wenjun 50'; Wu Lei (yellow card) 64'; Zhu Zhengrong 70'; Zhu Zhengrong (yellow card) 70'; WWu Lei 80'; Lü Wenjun 83'; Li Yunqiu (yellow card) 87'	Attendance: 11,532; Referee: (China) Hai Tan

16 June 2013 Round 12	Guizhou Renhe	1–0	Shanghai Shenxin	Guiyang Olympic Centre
19:35	Rafa Jordá 41'; Sun Jihai (yellow card) 65'	Summary	Ye Chongqiu (yellow card) 90'	Attendance: 20,083; Referee: (China) Li Jun

22 June 2013 Round 13	Guangzhou R&F	2–0	Shanghai Shenxin	Yuexiushan Stadium
19:35	Rafael Coelho (yellow card) 70'; Rafael Coelho 78'; Feng Zhuoyi (yellow card) 89'; Davi 90+4' (pen.)	Summary	Zhu Baojie (yellow card) 57'; Jailton Paraíba (yellow card) 67'; Jiang Zhipeng (yellow card) 70'; Wang Jiayu (yellow card) 86'	Attendance: 11,565; Referee: (China) Guo Baolong

26 June 2013 Round 14	Shanghai Shenxin	1–0	Wuhan Zall	Jinshan Sports Centre
19:45	Wang Yun 52'; Liu Junnan (yellow card) 73'	Summary	Ke Zhao (yellow card) 46'; Xin Feng (red card) 77'

30 June 2013 Round 15	Tianjin Teda	1–0	Shanghai Shenxin	Tianjin Olympic Center Stadium
19:35	Dinélson 8'; Paartalu (yellow card) 29'; Li Weifeng (yellow card) 34'; Dinélson (yellow card) 82'; Yang Qipeng (yellow card) 87'	Report		Referee: (China) Xia Jun

6 July 2013 Round 16	Shanghai Shenxin	0–3	Guangzhou Evergrande	Yuanshen Stadium
19:45	Liao Chengjian (yellow card) 31'; Liu Wenxi (yellow card) 42'; Kieza (yellow card) 53'	Summary	Zheng Zhi (yellow card) 8'; Zhao Peng (yellow card) 26'; Muriqui 49', 69', 82'; Sun Xiang (yellow card) 53'

13 July 2013 Round 17	Shanghai Shenhua	2–0	Shanghai Shenxin	Hongkou Football Stadium
19:45	Moreno 11'; Song Boxuan 40'; Zheng Kaimu (yellow card) 63'; Li Jianbin (yellow card) 89'; Wang Dalei (yellow card) 90+1'	Summary	Yu Tao (yellow card) 30'; Kieza (yellow card) 42'; Antônio Flávio (yellow card) 90+3'	Attendance: 12,235; Referee: (Australia) Brenton Hayward

1 August 2013 Round 18	Shanghai Shenxin	1–1	Jiangsu Sainty	Yuanshen Stadium
19:45	Johnny (yellow card) 38'; Kieza 61'; Zhang Yonghai (yellow card) 89'	Summary	Wu Xi 41'; Tajiev (yellow card) 84'	Attendance: 8,372; Referee: (China) Fan Qi

4 August 2013 Round 19	Liaoning Whowin	1–1	Shanghai Shenxin	Shenyang Tiexi Stadium
16:00	Trifunović 53'; Brandán (yellow card) 72'	Summary	Yang Shanping 68' (o.g.); Yu Tao (yellow card) 85'	Attendance: 20,113; Referee: (China) Li Haihe

10 August 2013 Round 20	Shanghai Shenxin	1–2	Beijing Guoan	Jinshan Sports Centre
19:45	Marrone (yellow card) 36'; Wang Yun 64'; Kieza (yellow card) 68'	Summary	Kanouté 34'; Zhang Xizhe 49'; Krimets (yellow card) 76'	Attendance: 8,372; Referee: (China) Wang Jin

18 August 2013 Round 21	Hangzhou Greentown	1–1	Shanghai Shenxin	Yellow Dragon Sports Center
19:35	Cao Xuan (yellow card) 48'; Gao Di 65'; Song Zhiwei (yellow card) 90+2'	Summary	Mao Jianqing (yellow card) 20' (goal) 27'; Johnny (yellow card) 40'; Liu Dianzuo (yellow card) 53'; Xu Wen (yellow card) 90+1'	Attendance: 13,021; Referee: (China) Zhong Jun

23 August 2013 Round 22	Shanghai Shenxin	2–1	Guizhou Renhe	Jinshan Sports Centre
19:45	Antônio Flávio 2' (yellow card) 39'; Ge Zhen (yellow card) 36'; Wang Jiayu 83'	Summary	Sun Jihai (yellow card) 25'; Misimović (yellow card) 32'; Li Chunyu (yellow card) 63'; Rafa Jordà 74'; Nano (yellow card) 87'	Attendance: 8,396; Referee: (China) Wang Zhe

30 August 2013 Round 23	Shandong Luneng	0–1	Shanghai Shenxin	Jinan Olympic Sports Center Stadium
19:35		Summary	Yang Jiawei 55'; Zhu Jiawei (yellow card) 66'; Yu Tao (yellow card) 76'; Mao Jianqing (yellow card) 89'	Attendance: 26,167; Referee: (China) Li Haihe

15 September 2013 Round 24	Shanghai Shenxin	1–2	Dalian Aerbin	Jinshan Sports Centre
15:35	Zhang Yonghai (yellow card) 7'; Kieza 12' (yellow card) 14'; Wang Jiayu (yellow card) 85'	Summary	Baha 31'; Mullen (yellow card) 36'; Zhao Hejing (yellow card) 57'; Yu Hanchao 61'	Attendance: 7,952; Referee: (China) Zhou Gang

22 September 2013 Round 25	Shanghai Shenxin	1–0	Qingdao Jonoon	Jinshan Sports Centre
19:45	Mao Jianqing 19'; Zhu Jiawei (yellow card) 29'; Jaílton Paraíba (yellow card) 54'; Liu Junnan (yellow card) 60'; Johnny (yellow card) 88'	Summary	Guo Liang (yellow card) 13'; Gustavo (yellow card) 47'; Li Zhuangfei (yellow card) 85'

29 September 2013 Round 26	Shanghai Shenxin	0–1	Changchun Yatai	Jinshan Sports Centre
15:35	Zhang Yonghai (yellow card) 23'; Mao Jianqing (yellow card) 58'	Summary	Cao Tianbao 20'; Rezek (yellow card) 44'	Attendance: 6,870; Referee: (Australia) Lucien Laverdue

5 October 2013 Round 27	Shanghai SIPG	0–1	Shanghai Shenxin	Shanghai Stadium
19:45	Cebezas (yellow card) 85'; McBreen (yellow card) 90+4'	Summary	Sun Kai 1' (o.g.); Zhu Jiawei (yellow card) 84'; Jaílton Paraíba (yellow card) 87'	Attendance: 10,079; Referee: (China) Huang Yejun

19 October 2013 Round 28	Shanghai Shenxin	1–0	Guangzhou R&F	Jinshan Sports Centre
19:45	Jaílton Paraíba 26'; Yu Tao (yellow card) 31'; Marrone (yellow card) 87'	Summary	Griffiths (yellow card) 21'; Cheng Yuelei (red card) 23'; Yakubu (yellow card) 44'

30 October 2013 Round 29	Wuhan Zall	v	Shanghai Shenxin	Wuhan Sports Center Stadium
15:35

3 November 2013 Round 30	Shanghai Shenxin	v	Tianjin Teda	Jinshan Sports Centre
15:35

=== Chinese FA Cup ===
22 May 2013 Third round	Shanghai Shenxin	2–3	Hunan Xiangtao	Jinshan Sports Centre
15:30		Summary

10 July 2013 Fourth round	Hangzhou Greentown	2–0	Shanghai Shenxin	Yellow Dragon Sports Center
15:30		Summary
