= 2007 AFC Asian Cup Group C =

Football tournament group stage

Group C of the 2007 AFC Asian Cup was one of four groups of nations competing at the 2007 AFC Asian Cup. The group's first round of matches began on 10 July and its last matches were played on 18 July. All six group matches were played in Kuala Lumpur, Malaysia. The group consisted of hosts Malaysia, Iran, Uzbekistan and China PR.

== Standings ==
Pos	Team	Pld	W	D	L	GF	GA	GD	Pts	Qualification
1	Iran	3	2	1	0	6	3	+3	7	Advance to knockout stage
2	Uzbekistan	3	2	0	1	9	2	+7	6	Advance to knockout stage
3	China	3	1	1	1	7	6	+1	4	
4	Malaysia (H)	3	0	0	3	1	12	−11	0	

Source: Asian Cup 2007
Rules for classification: Tiebreakers
(H) Hosts

All times are UTC+8.

== Malaysia vs China PR ==
10 July 2007
20:35

Malaysia	1 – 5	China
Indra 74'	Report	Han Peng 15', 55'; Shao Jiayi 36'; Wang Dong 51', 90+3'

Bukit Jalil Stadium, Kuala Lumpur
Attendance: 21,155
Referee: Muhsen Basma (Syria)

Malaysia	China PR

GK	1	Azizon Abdul Kadir
RB	3	Fauzi Nan
CB	7	Kaironnisam Sahabudin (c)
CB	5	Norhafiz Zamani
LB	19	Rosdi Talib
DM	12	Shukor Adan	(yellow card) 40'
RM	15	Shahrulnizam Mustapa		(substituted off) 46'
CM	10	Hardi Jaafar
LM	18	Fadzli Saari		(substituted off) 58'
CF	14	Akmal Rizal		(substituted off) 62'
CF	20	Hairuddin Omar
Substitutions:
MF	9	Eddy Helmi		(substituted on) 46'
MF	17	K. Nanthakumar		(substituted on) 58'
FW	13	Indra Putra Mahayuddin	(yellow card) 73'	(substituted on) 62'
Manager:
Norizan Bakar

GK	1	Li Leilei
RB	7	Sun Jihai
CB	4	Zhang Yaokun
CB	5	Li Weifeng	(yellow card) 75'
LB	3	Sun Xiang
DM	18	Zhou Haibin
DM	10	Zheng Zhi (c)	(yellow card) 77'
CM	15	Wang Dong
RF	6	Shao Jiayi		(substituted off) 67'
CF	9	Han Peng		(substituted off) 72'
LF	20	Mao Jianqing		(substituted off) 88'
Substitutions:
MF	8	Li Tie		(substituted on) 67'
FW	11	Dong Fangzhuo		(substituted on) 72'
MF	19	Zheng Bin		(substituted on) 88'
Manager:
Zhu Guanghu

Man of the Match:
Han Peng (China PR)

Assistant referees:
Hamdi Al Kadri (Syria)
Kadom Arab Mohammad (Iraq)
Fourth official:
Abdulrahman Abdou (Qatar)

== Iran vs Uzbekistan ==
11 July 2007
18:20

Iran	2 – 1	Uzbekistan
Hosseini 55'; Kazemian 78'	Report	Rezaei 16' (o.g.)

Bukit Jalil Stadium, Kuala Lumpur
Attendance: 1,863
Referee: Saad Kamil Al-Fadhli (Kuwait)

Iran	Uzbekistan

GK	1	Hassan Roudbarian
RB	2	Mehdi Mahdavikia (c)	(yellow card) 77'
CB	12	Jalal Hosseini
CB	5	Rahman Rezaei
LB	6	Javad Nekounam
RM	9	Vahid Hashemian		(substituted off) 73'
CM	4	Andranik Teymourian	(yellow card) 49'
LM	10	Rasoul Khatibi		(substituted off) 46'
AM	7	Ferydoon Zandi
AM	8	Ali Karimi		(substituted off) 90'
CF	16	Reza Enayati
Substitutions:
MF	17	Javad Kazemian		(substituted on) 46'
MF	11	Mehrzad Madanchi		(substituted on) 73'
DF	15	Hadi Aghily		(substituted on) 90'
Manager:
Amir Ghalenoei

GK	1	Pavel Bugalo
RB	17	Aleksey Nikolaev
CB	4	Aziz Ibrahimov
CB	2	Hayrulla Karimov
LB	23	Vitaly Denisov
CM	7	Aziz Haydarov		(substituted off) 61'
CM	18	Timur Kapadze
RW	19	Islom Inomov	(yellow card) 81'
AM	8	Server Djeparov (c)
LW	9	Pavel Solomin		(substituted off) 64'
CF	10	Ulugbek Bakayev		(substituted off) 81'
Substitutions:
FW	11	Marat Bikmaev		(substituted on) 64'
MF	13	Khikmat Khashimov		(substituted on) 61'
FW	15	Alexander Geynrikh		(substituted on) 81'
Manager:
Rauf Inileev

Man of the Match:
Javad Kazemian (Iran)

Assistant referees:
Yaser Ahmad Marad (Kuwait)
Mohammed Al Ghamdi (Saudi Arabia)
Fourth official:
Khalil Al Ghamdi (Saudi Arabia)

== Uzbekistan vs Malaysia ==
14 July 2007
18:20

Uzbekistan	5 – 0	Malaysia
Shatskikh 10', 89'; Kapadze 30'; Bakayev 45+2' (pen.); Ibrahimov 85'	Report

Bukit Jalil Stadium, Kuala Lumpur
Attendance: 7,137
Referee: Abdulrahman Abdou (Qatar)

Uzbekistan	Malaysia

GK	12	Ignatiy Nesterov
RB	17	Aleksey Nikolaev
CB	6	Anzur Ismailov		(substituted off) 50'
CB	2	Hayrulla Karimov
LB	19	Islom Inomov	(yellow card) 24'
CM	26	Victor Karpenko
CM	18	Timur Kapadze
CM	23	Vitaliy Denisov		(substituted off) 68'
AM	8	Server Djeparov
CF	10	Ulugbek Bakayev	(yellow card) 57'	(substituted off) 63'
CF	16	Maksim Shatskikh (c)
Substitutions:
DF	4	Aziz Ibrahimov		(substituted on) 50'
FW	15	Alexander Geynrikh		(substituted on) 63'
FW	9	Pavel Solomin		(substituted on) 68'
Manager:
Rauf Inileev

GK	1	Azizon Abdul Kadir
CB	12	Shukor Adan
CB	7	Kaironnisam Sahabudin (c)	(yellow card) 36'
CB	17	K. Nanthakumar
RM	6	V. Thirumurugan
CM	22	Ivan Yusoff		(substituted off) 55'
CM	10	Hardi Jaafar		(substituted off) 83'
LM	19	Rosdi Talib	(yellow card) 9'
RF	15	Shahrulnizam Mustapa
CF	20	Hairuddin Omar		(substituted off) 71'
LF	13	Indra Putra Mahayuddin
Substitutions:
FW	11	Nor Farhan Muhammad		(substituted on) 55'
FW	14	Akmal Rizal		(substituted on) 71'
MF	18	Fadzli Saari		(substituted on) 83'
Manager:
Norizan Bakar

Man of the Match:
Maksim Shatskikh (Uzbekistan)

Assistant referees:
Hamdi Al Kadri (Syria)
Kadom Arab Mohammad (Iraq)
Fourth official:
Muhsen Basma (Iran)

== China PR vs Iran ==
15 July 2007
18:20

China	2 – 2	Iran
Shao Jiayi 7'; Mao Jianqing 33'	Report	Zandi 45+1'; Nekounam 74'

Bukit Jalil Stadium, Kuala Lumpur
Attendance: 5,938
Referee: Khalil Al-Ghamdi (Saudi Arabia)

China PR	Iran

GK	1	Li Leilei
RB	7	Sun Jihai
CB	4	Zhang Yaokun
CB	5	Li Weifeng	(yellow card) 59'
LB	3	Sun Xiang
DM	18	Zhou Haibin	(yellow card) 90+2'
DM	10	Zheng Zhi (c)	(yellow card) 27'
CM	15	Wang Dong		(substituted off) 61'
RF	6	Shao Jiayi
CF	9	Han Peng	(yellow card) 46'	(substituted off) 79'
LF	20	Mao Jianqing		(substituted off) 68'
Substitutions:
MF	12	Zhao Xuri		(substituted on) 61'
DF	2	Du Wei		(substituted on) 79'
DF	14	Zhu Ting		(substituted on) 68'
Manager:
Zhu Guanghu

GK	1	Hassan Roudbarian
RB	13	Hossein Kaebi		(substituted off) 46'
CB	12	Jalal Hosseini
CB	5	Rahman Rezaei	(yellow card) 40'
LB	6	Javad Nekounam	(yellow card) 6'
RM	2	Mehdi Mahdavikia (c)
CM	4	Andranik Teymourian
LM	9	Vahid Hashemian
AM	7	Ferydoon Zandi		(substituted off) 89'
AM	8	Ali Karimi		(substituted off) 46'
CF	16	Reza Enayati
Substitutions:
MF	14	Iman Mobali		(substituted on) 46'
MF	17	Javad Kazemian		(substituted on) 46'
MF	11	Mehrzad Madanchi	(yellow card) 90+1'	(substituted on) 89'
Manager:
Amir Ghalenoei

Man of the Match:
Mao Jianqing (China PR)

Assistant referees:
Mohammed Al Ghamdi (Saudi Arabia)
Abdullah Al Amouri (Oman)
Fourth official:
Saad Kamil Al-Fadhli (Kuwait)

== Malaysia vs Iran ==
18 July 2007
20:35

Malaysia	0 – 2	Iran
	Report	Nekounam 29' (pen.); Teymourian 77'

Bukit Jalil Stadium, Kuala Lumpur
Attendance: 4,520
Referee: Muhsen Basma (Syria)

Malaysia	Iran

GK	1	Azizon Abdul Kadir
CB	23	Aidil Zafuan
CB	7	Kaironnisam Sahabudin (c)
CB	2	Hamzani Omar		(substituted off) 73'
RM	6	V. Thirumurugan
CM	12	Shukor Adan	(yellow card) 44'
CM	17	K. Nanthakumar
LM	19	Rosdi Talib
RF	15	Shahrulnizam Mustapa		(substituted off) 68'
CF	8	Safee Sali		(substituted off) 53'
LF	13	Indra Putra Mahayuddin
Substitutions:
MF	10	Hardi Jaafar		(substituted on) 53'
FW	11	Nor Farhan Muhammad		(substituted on) 68'
DF	3	Fauzi Nan		(substituted on) 73'
Manager:
Norizan Bakar

GK	1	Hassan Roudbarian
RB	2	Mehdi Mahdavikia (c)
CB	12	Jalal Hosseini
CB	5	Rahman Rezaei
LB	14	Iman Mobali		(substituted off) 52'
DM	6	Javad Nekounam
RM	7	Ferydoon Zandi
CM	4	Andranik Teymourian
LM	8	Ali Karimi
SS	9	Vahid Hashemian	(yellow card) 39'	(substituted off) 79'
CF	16	Reza Enayati		(substituted off) 46'
Substitutions:
FW	10	Rasoul Khatibi	(yellow card) 63'	(substituted on) 46'
MF	17	Javad Kazemian		(substituted on) 52'
MF	18	Mehdi Rajabzadeh		(substituted on) 79'
Manager:
Amir Ghalenoei

Man of the Match:
Javad Nekounam (Iran)

Assistant referees:
Hamdi Al Kadri (Syria)
Mohammed Al Ghamdi (Saudi Arabia)
Fourth official:
Khalil Al Ghamdi (Saudi Arabia)

== Uzbekistan vs China PR ==
18 July 2007
20:35

Uzbekistan	3 – 0	China
Shatskikh 72'; Kapadze 86'; Geynrikh 90+4'	Report

Shah Alam Stadium, Shah Alam
Attendance: 2,200
Referee: Saad Kamil Al-Fadhli (Kuwait)

Uzbekistan	China PR

GK	12	Ignatiy Nesterov
RB	17	Aleksey Nikolaev
CB	4	Aziz Ibrahimov		(substituted off) 90+3'
CB	2	Hayrulla Karimov	(yellow card) 59'
LB	28	Anvar Gafurov
CM	7	Aziz Haydarov
CM	18	Timur Kapadze
RW	10	Ulugbek Bakayev	(yellow card) 6'	(substituted off) 46'
AM	8	Server Djeparov
LW	23	Vitaliy Denisov		(substituted off) 63'
CF	16	Maksim Shatskikh (c)
Substitutions:
FW	15	Alexander Geynrikh		(substituted on) 46'
MF	26	Victor Karpenko		(substituted on) 63'
FW	9	Pavel Solomin		(substituted on) 90+3'
Manager:
Rauf Inileev

GK	22	Yang Jun
CB	4	Zhang Yaokun
CB	2	Du Wei
CB	13	Zhang Shuai		(substituted off) 78'
RWB	7	Sun Jihai (c)
LWB	3	Sun Xiang
DM	18	Zhou Haibin	(yellow card) 57'
RM	11	Dong Fangzhuo		(substituted off) 70'
LM	20	Mao Jianqing		(substituted off) 41'
AM	6	Shao Jiayi
CF	9	Han Peng
Substitutions:
MF	15	Wang Dong		(substituted on) 41'
MF	12	Zhao Xuri		(substituted on) 70'
DF	14	Zhu Ting	(yellow card) 88'	(substituted on) 78'
Manager:
Zhu Guanghu

Man of the Match:
Maksim Shatskikh (Uzbekistan)

Assistant referees:
Yaser Ahmad Marad (Kuwait)
Abdullah Al Amouri (Oman)
Fourth official:
Abdulrahman Abdou (Qatar)
