= Zou Zhongting =

Chinese footballer

Zou Zhongting 邹仲霆
Personal information
- Date of birth: 21 May 1987 (age 39)
- Place of birth: Shanghai, China
- Height: 1.87 m (6 ft 1 1/2 in)
- Positions: Centre-back; forward

Team information
- Current team: Shanghai Mitsubishi

Youth career
- Shanghai Shenhua

Senior career*
| Years | Team | Apps | (Gls) |
| 2007–2009 | Shaanxi Renhe | 1 | (0) |
| 2010–2016 | Shanghai Shenxin | 112 | (5) |
| 2017–2021 | Beijing Enterprises | 119 | (6) |
| 2022- | Shanghai Mitsubishi | 0 | (0) |
- * Club domestic league appearances and goals as of 25 May 2022

Zou Zhongting (Chinese: 邹仲霆; pinyin: Zōu Zhòngtíng; born 21 May 1987) is a Chinese football player who currently plays for Chinese club a Shanghai Mitsubishi.

== Club career ==
Zou received organized football training at Shanghai Shenhua Football School under coach Zhu Jiong in the early year. He joined Shaanxi Renhe after Zhu Jiong became the assistant coach of the team. He made his Chinese Super League debut on 14 November 2007, in the last match of the season against Wuhan Guanggu, initially as a forward in a game that ended in a 2-1 defeat. He would not play for Shaanxi for the next two seasons.

Zou transferred to Chinese Super League newcomer Nanchang Hengyuan in 2010, rejoining Zhu Jiong who was the manager of the club. On 27 March 2010, he made his debut for Nanchang in a 2–0 away defeat against Beijing Guoan, coming on as a substitute for Wang Bo in the 62nd minute. He scored his first goal on 22 August 2010 against Changchun Yatai, which ensured Nanchang's 2–0 home victory. On 15 July 2012 in a league game against Henan Jianye, Zou would be converted to a centre-back in a 2-0 victory.

On 7 February 2017, Zou transferred to China League One side Beijing Enterprises.

== Career statistics ==
Statistics accurate as of match played 31 December 2020.

Appearances and goals by club, season and competition
| Club | Season | League | | | National Cup | | Continental | | Other | | Total | |
| Club | Season | Division | Apps | Goals | Apps | Goals | Apps | Goals | Apps | Goals | Apps | Goals |
|---|---|---|---|---|---|---|---|---|---|---|---|---|
| Shaanxi Renhe | 2007 | Chinese Super League | 1 | 0 | - | | - | | - | | 1 | 0 |
| Shaanxi Renhe | 2008 | Chinese Super League | 0 | 0 | - | | - | | - | | 0 | 0 |
| Shaanxi Renhe | 2009 | Chinese Super League | 0 | 0 | - | | - | | - | | 0 | 0 |
| Shaanxi Renhe | Total | | 1 | 0 | 0 | 0 | 0 | 0 | 0 | 0 | 1 | 0 |
| Shanghai Shenxin | 2010 | Chinese Super League | 18 | 3 | - | | - | | - | | 18 | 3 |
| Shanghai Shenxin | 2011 | Chinese Super League | 18 | 0 | 2 | 0 | - | | - | | 20 | 0 |
| Shanghai Shenxin | 2012 | Chinese Super League | 20 | 1 | 1 | 0 | - | | - | | 21 | 1 |
| Shanghai Shenxin | 2013 | Chinese Super League | 17 | 0 | 1 | 0 | - | | - | | 18 | 0 |
| Shanghai Shenxin | 2014 | Chinese Super League | 8 | 0 | 2 | 1 | - | | - | | 10 | 1 |
| Shanghai Shenxin | 2015 | Chinese Super League | 13 | 0 | 0 | 0 | - | | - | | 13 | 0 |
| Shanghai Shenxin | 2016 | China League One | 21 | 2 | 1 | 0 | - | | - | | 22 | 2 |
| Shanghai Shenxin | Total | | 115 | 6 | 7 | 1 | 0 | 0 | 0 | 0 | 122 | 7 |
| Beijing Enterprises | 2017 | China League One | 20 | 0 | 0 | 0 | - | | - | | 20 | 0 |
| Beijing Enterprises | 2018 | China League One | 29 | 0 | 0 | 0 | - | | - | | 29 | 0 |
| Beijing Enterprises | 2019 | China League One | 30 | 3 | 0 | 0 | - | | - | | 30 | 3 |
| Beijing Enterprises | 2020 | China League One | 15 | 0 | - | | - | | - | | 15 | 3 |
| Beijing Enterprises | Total | | 94 | 3 | 0 | 0 | 0 | 0 | 0 | 0 | 94 | 3 |
| Career total | | | 210 | 9 | 7 | 1 | 0 | 0 | 0 | 0 | 217 | 10 |
