= Zhang Hao (footballer) =

Chinese footballer (born 1994)

Zhang Hao 张浩
Personal information
- Date of birth: 23 May 1994 (age 32)
- Place of birth: Harbin, Heilongjiang, China
- Height: 1.90 m (6 ft 3 in)
- Positions: Midfielder; centre-back

Senior career*
Years	Team	Apps	(Gls)
2013–2018	Shanghai Shenxin	10	(0)
2019–2021	Heilongjiang Lava Spring	62	(3)
2022	Kunshan FC	13	(0)
2023-2024	Guangdong GZ-Power	21	(1)
- * Club domestic league appearances and goals as of 24 December 2022

Zhang Hao (Chinese: 张浩; born 23 May 1994) is a Chinese football player who plays as a midfielder or centre-back.

On 10 September 2024, Chinese Football Association announced that Zhang was banned from football-related activities for five years, from 10 September 2024 to 9 September 2029, for involving in match-fixing.

== Club career ==
Zhang started his professional football career in July 2013 when he joined Chinese Super League side Shanghai Shenxin. On 20 July 2014, Zhang made his debut for Shanghai Shenxin in the 2014 Chinese Super League against Dalian Aerbin, coming on as a substitute for Yang Jiawei in the 67th minute. He was utilized very sparsely and was part of the squad that was relegated to the second tier at the end of the 2015 Chinese Super League campaign.

On 28 February 2019, Zhang transferred to his hometown club Heilongjiang FC in the China League One. He would make his debut in a league game on 10 March 2019 against Shaanxi Chang'an Athletic that ended in a 1-0 victory. After three seasons with Heilongjiang he transferred to second tier club Kunshan FC and was part of the squad that won the division and promotion to the top tier at the end of the 2022 China League One campaign.

== Career statistics ==
Statistics accurate as of match played 24 December 2022.

Appearances and goals by club, season and competition
Club	Season	League			National Cup		Continental		Other		Total	
Club	Season	Division	Apps	Goals	Apps	Goals	Apps	Goals	Apps	Goals	Apps	Goals
Shanghai Shenxin	2013	Chinese Super League	0	0	0	0	-		-		0	0
Shanghai Shenxin	2014	Chinese Super League	1	0	1	0	-		-		2	0
Shanghai Shenxin	2015	Chinese Super League	0	0	0	0	-		-		0	0
Shanghai Shenxin	2017	China League One	0	0	1	1	-		-		1	1
Shanghai Shenxin	2018	China League One	9	0	1	0	-		-		10	0
Shanghai Shenxin	Total		10	0	3	1	0	0	0	0	13	1
Heilongjiang Lava Spring	2019	China League One	23	0	1	0	-		-		24	0
Heilongjiang Lava Spring	2020	China League One	13	1	-		-		2 (Note: Appearances in China League One relegation play-offs)	0	15	1
Heilongjiang Lava Spring	2021	China League One	26	2	0	0	-		-		26	2
Heilongjiang Lava Spring	Total		62	3	1	0	0	0	2	0	65	1
Kunshan FC	2022	China League One	13	0	1	0	-		-		14	0
Career total			85	3	5	1	0	0	2	0	92	4

== Honours ==
=== Club ===
Kunshan FC

- China League One: 2022
