= Mao Jianqing =

Chinese footballer

Mao Jianqing 毛剑卿
Personal information
- Date of birth: August 8, 1986 (age 40)
- Place of birth: Shanghai, China
- Height: 1.85 m (6 ft 1 in)
- Positions: Winger; striker

Youth career
- 2000–2001: Shanghai 02
- 2002–2003: Shanghai Shenhua

Senior career*
Years	Team	Apps	(Gls)
2004–2009	Shanghai Shenhua	74	(7)
2009	→ Shenzhen Asia Travel (loan)	11	(2)
2010–2011	Shaanxi Baorong Chanba	32	(5)
2011	→ Hangzhou Greentown (loan)	11	(2)
2012–2014	Beijing Guoan	18	(1)
2013	→ Shanghai Shenxin (loan)	9	(2)
2014	→ Qingdao Jonoon (loan)	22	(6)
2015–2016	Shijiazhuang Ever Bright	42	(9)
2017–2019	Shanghai Shenhua	34	(3)

International career^{‡}
2006–2017	China	10	(2)
Medal record
Representing China
Men's football
AFC U-17 Championship
Bronze medal – third place	2002 UAE	Team
- * Club domestic league appearances and goals as of 31 December 2019 ‡ National team caps and goals as of 10 January 2017

Mao Jianqing
- Simplified Chinese: 毛剑卿
- Traditional Chinese: 毛劍卿
Transcriptions
Standard Mandarin
- Hanyu Pinyin: Máo Jiànqīng
- IPA: [mǎʊ tɕjɛ̂n tɕʰíŋ]

Máo Jiànqīng (Chinese: 毛剑卿; pinyin: Máo Jiànqīng; born August 8, 1986) is a Chinese international former football player.

== Club career ==
Mao Jianqing started his professional football career in 2004 with Shanghai Shenhua after graduating from their youth team. He made his debut in a league game against Shenyang Ginde on June 13, 2006 in a 0-0 draw where he came on as a substitute. In his first season for Shenhua he played in four league games; however, he did not score his first goal and establish himself for them until the 2006 season where he was a significant part of the team that came second in the Chinese Super League. The following seasons saw his speed, strength, confidence, strong shot and intelligent ball control make him one not only the club's first choice winger but also the national team.

In December 2008 Mao Jianqing was arrested for his involvement in a bloody restaurant brawl in the city where a local man was beaten and two women were hurt. The fight started in an apparent fit of jealousy over a woman and came hours after the Shenhua team suffered a disappointing tie that cost them the league title. After being held in custody for one week and making a public apology, Mao was allowed to return to Shenhua. His public assault charge saw him dropped from the team, although he briefly regained his place within the team until the transfer window opened and he was loaned out to Shenzhen Asia Travel for the remainder of the season.

A permanent transfer to Shaanxi Baorong Chanba occurred on 12 February 2010. He was loaned out to Hangzhou Greentown and later transferred to Beijing Guoan in 2012. He was loaned to Shanghai Shenxin in July 2013. In February 2014, Mao was loaned to Qingdao Jonoon until the end of the 2014 season. On 26 January 2015, Mao transferred to fellow Chinese Super League side Shijiazhuang Ever Bright.

On 1 December 2016, Mao rejoined his former club Shanghai Shenhua. The move would see him go on to re-establish himself as an integral part of the team and see him win his first piece of silverware when the club won the 2017 Chinese FA Cup. The following season saw Mao's game time significantly reduced after a flare-up on his left knee from previous injury required him to have surgery. With persistent injuries on both his legs, Mao would announce his retirement from playing on 4 March 2020 and that he would looking to move into coaching.

== International career ==
Mao Jianqing was included in the under-23 squad to play Football at the 2006 Asian Games in Doha; however, he missed the tournament due to injury. Mao Jianqing still went on to join the senior team and made his debut against Palestine in a 2-0 win on October 11, 2006 where he also scored to send them to China to the 2007 AFC Asian Cup finals. Under the head coach Zhu Guanghu he became the first choice left-winger within the Chinese team and was included in the Asian Cup Cup tournament. Within that campaign he started in all of China's games where they were knocked out in the group stages and scored his only goal of the tournament against Iran in their 2-2 draw.

== Career statistics ==
=== Club ===
Statistics accurate as of match played 31 December 2019.

Appearances and goals by club, season and competition
Club	Season	League			National Cup		League Cup		Continental		Other		Total	
Club	Season	Division	Apps	Goals	Apps	Goals	Apps	Goals	Apps	Goals	Apps	Goals	Apps	Goals
Shanghai Shenhua	2004	Chinese Super League	4	0	1	0	?	0	0	0	-		5	0
Shanghai Shenhua	2005	Chinese Super League	4	1	2	0	1	0	-		-		7	1
Shanghai Shenhua	2006	Chinese Super League	11	2	1	1	-		3	0	-		15	3
Shanghai Shenhua	2007	Chinese Super League	23	0	-		-		4	0	-		27	0
Shanghai Shenhua	2008	Chinese Super League	24	2	-		-		-		-		24	2
Shanghai Shenhua	2009	Chinese Super League	8	2	-		-		5	0	-		13	2
Shanghai Shenhua	Total		74	7	4	1	1	0	12	0	0	0	91	8
Shenzhen Asia Travel (loan)	2009	Chinese Super League	11	2	-		-		-		-		11	2
Shaanxi Baorong Chanba	2010	Chinese Super League	24	5	-		-		-		-		24	5
Shaanxi Baorong Chanba	2011	Chinese Super League	8	0	0	0	-		-		-		8	0
Shaanxi Baorong Chanba	Total		32	5	0	0	0	0	0	0	0	0	32	5
Hangzhou Greentown (loan)	2011	Chinese Super League	11	2	2	0	-		-		-		13	2
Beijing Guoan	2012	Chinese Super League	14	1	1	0	-		5	0	-		20	1
Beijing Guoan	2013	Chinese Super League	4	0	0	0	-		4	0	-		8	0
Beijing Guoan	Total		18	1	1	0	0	0	9	0	0	0	28	1
Shanghai Shenxin (loan)	2013	Chinese Super League	9	2	1	0	-		-		-		10	2
Qingdao Jonoon (loan)	2014	China League One	22	6	3	0	-		-		-		25	6
Shijiazhuang Ever Bright	2015	Chinese Super League	16	4	1	0	-		-		-		17	4
Shijiazhuang Ever Bright	2016	Chinese Super League	26	5	0	0	-		-		-		26	5
Shijiazhuang Ever Bright	Total		42	9	1	0	0	0	0	0	0	0	43	9
Shanghai Shenhua	2017	Chinese Super League	27	3	7	2	-		1	0	-		35	5
Shanghai Shenhua	2018	Chinese Super League	7	0	1	0	-		5	1	1 (Note: Appearances in Chinese FA Super Cup)	0	14	1
Shanghai Shenhua	Total		34	3	8	2	0	0	6	1	1	0	49	6
Career total			253	37	20	3	1	0	27	1	1	0	302	41

=== International goals ===
Scores and results list China's goal tally first.

No	Date	Venue	Opponent	Score	Result	Competition
1.	11 October 2006	King Abdullah II Stadium, Amman, Jordan	Palestine	1–0	2–0	2007 AFC Asian Cup qualification
2.	15 July 2007	Bukit Jalil National Stadium, Kuala Lumpur, Malaysia	Iran	2–0	2–2	2007 AFC Asian Cup

== Honours ==
=== Club ===
Shanghai Shenhua

- Chinese FA Cup: 2017
