= Lin Xiang =

Chinese footballer

Lin Xiang 林翔
Personal information
- Full name: Lin Xiang
- Date of birth: 24 September 1991 (age 35)
- Place of birth: Shanghai, China
- Height: 1.87 m (6 ft 2 in)
- Position: Goalkeeper

Team information
- Current team: Ningbo FC
- Number: 1

Senior career*
Years	Team	Apps	(Gls)
2010–2018	Shanghai Shenxin	14	(0)
2019–2020	Zibo Cuju	44	(0)
2022	Kunshan FC	0	(0)
2023–2024	Shanghai Jiading Huilong	53	(0)
2025	Shijiazhuang Gongfu	12	(0)
2025	→ Shanghai Jiading Huilong (loan)	13	(0)
2026–	Ningbo FC	0	(0)
- * Club domestic league appearances and goals as of 8 March 2026

Lin Xiang (born 24 September 1991 in Shanghai) is a Chinese footballer who plays as a goalkeeper for China League One club Ningbo FC.

== Club career ==
In 2010, Lin Xiang started his professional footballer career with Shanghai Shenxin in the Chinese Super League. On 25 October 2015, Lin made his debut for Shanghai Shenxin in the 2015 Chinese Super League against Henan Jianye. Often utilized as a second choice goalkeeper, he was allowed to leave the club on 19 February 2019 and transferred to League Two side Zibo Cuju. He would go on to establish himself as an integral member of the team and go on to gain promotion with the club at the end of the 2020 China League Two campaign. Despite this achievement he was not kept on at the club and on 27 April 2022 he joined second-tier club Kunshan FC where he was part of the squad that won the division and promotion to the top tier.

== Career statistics ==
Statistics accurate as of match played 31 December 2025.

Appearances and goals by club, season and competition
Club	Season	League			National Cup		Continental		Other		Total	
Club	Season	Division	Apps	Goals	Apps	Goals	Apps	Goals	Apps	Goals	Apps	Goals
Shanghai Shenxin	2010	Chinese Super League	0	0	-		-		-		0	0
Shanghai Shenxin	2011	Chinese Super League	0	0	0	0	-		-		0	0
Shanghai Shenxin	2012	Chinese Super League	0	0	0	0	-		-		0	0
Shanghai Shenxin	2013	Chinese Super League	0	0	0	0	-		-		0	0
Shanghai Shenxin	2014	Chinese Super League	0	0	0	0	-		-		0	0
Shanghai Shenxin	2015	Chinese Super League	2	0	1	0	-		-		3	0
Shanghai Shenxin	2016	China League One	12	0	1	0	-		-		13	0
Shanghai Shenxin	2017	China League One	0	0	4	0	-		-		4	0
Shanghai Shenxin	2018	China League One	0	0	1	0	-		-		1	0
Shanghai Shenxin	Total		14	0	7	0	0	0	0	0	21	0
Zibo Cuju	2019	China League Two	32	0	0	0	-		-		32	0
Zibo Cuju	2020	China League Two	12	0	-		-		-		12	0
Zibo Cuju	Total		44	0	0	0	0	0	0	0	44	0
Kunshan FC	2022	China League One	0	0	2	0	-		-		2	0
Shanghai Jiading Huilong	2023	China League One	25	0	0	0	-		-		25	0
Shanghai Jiading Huilong	2024	China League One	28	0	0	0	-		-		28	0
Shanghai Jiading Huilong	Total		53	0	0	0	0	0	0	0	53	0
Shijiazhuang Gongfu	2025	China League One	12	0	0	0	-		-		12	0
Shanghai Jiading Huilong (loan)	2025	China League One	13	0	0	0	-		-		13	0
Career total			136	0	9	0	0	0	0	0	145	0

== Honours ==
=== Club ===
Kunshan FC

- China League One: 2022
