= Liu Junnan =

Chinese footballer

Personal information
- Full name: Liu Junnan
- Date of birth: 31 August 1991 (age 35)
- Place of birth: Shanghai China
- Height: 1.75 m (5 ft 9 in)
- Position: Midfielder

Team information
- Current team: Shanghai Mitsubishi

Senior career*
Years	Team	Apps	(Gls)
2011–2012	Shanghai Shenhua	7	(0)
2013–2016	Shanghai Shenxin	50	(2)
2017–2018	Shijiazhuang Ever Bright		
2019–2020	Shanghai Jiading Huilong	6	(0)
2021	Shanghai Huajiao		
2022-	Shanghai Mitsubishi	0	(0)
- * Club domestic league appearances and goals as of 24 May 2022

Liu Junnan (Chinese: 刘峻楠, born 31 August 1991) is a Chinese footballer who currently plays as a midfielder for Chinese club a Shanghai Mitsubishi.

== Club career ==
Liu Junnan started his football career with Shanghai Shenhua F.C. where he would make his league debut for them on July 10, 2011 when he came on as a late substitute for Cao Yunding against Qingdao Jonoon F.C. in a 2-1 defeat. Liu would struggle to establish himself within the team and was publicly criticized by his club manager Dražen Besek for diving during a league game against Nanchang Hengyuan on October 29, 2011 in 0-0 draw. While Liu stayed on for a further season he would eventually leave the club at the beginning of the 2013 Chinese Super League season when he joined another top tier club Shanghai Shenxin F.C. where he made his league debut for them on March 29, 2013 against Jiangsu Sainty in a 2-2 draw where he also scored his first goal for them.

In February 2017, Liu transferred to League One club Shijiazhuang Ever Bright. He would represent their reserve team for two seasons before joining fourth tier football club Shanghai Jiading Huilong. At Shanghai he would gain promotion with them in his first season at the end of the 2019 league campaign.

== Career statistics ==
Statistics accurate as of match played 31 December 2020.

Appearances and goals by club, season and competition
Club	Season	League			National Cup		Continental		Other		Total	
Club	Season	Division	Apps	Goals	Apps	Goals	Apps	Goals	Apps	Goals	Apps	Goals
Shanghai Shenhua	2011	Chinese Super League	2	0	0	0	0	0	-		2	0
Shanghai Shenhua	2012	Chinese Super League	5	0	0	0	-		-		5	0
Shanghai Shenhua	Total		7	0	0	0	0	0	0	0	7	0
Shanghai Shenxin	2013	Chinese Super League	15	1	0	0	-		-		15	0
Shanghai Shenxin	2014	Chinese Super League	17	0	1	1	-		-		18	1
Shanghai Shenxin	2015	Chinese Super League	13	1	1	0	-		-		14	1
Shanghai Shenxin	2016	China League One	5	0	2	1	-		-		7	1
Shanghai Shenxin	Total		50	2	4	2	0	0	0	0	54	4
Shanghai Jiading Huilong	2019	Chinese Champions League	-		1	0	-		-		1	0
Shanghai Jiading Huilong	2020	China League Two	6	0	-		-		-		6	0
Shanghai Jiading Huilong	Total		6	0	1	0	0	0	0	0	7	0
Career total			63	2	5	2	0	0	0	0	68	4
