= Sun Ji (footballer) =

Chinese footballer

Sun Ji 孙吉
Personal information
- Date of birth: 15 January 1982 (age 44)
- Place of birth: Shanghai, China
- Height: 1.82 m (6 ft 0 in)
- Position: Right back

Youth career
- 2000–2001: Shanghai 02

Senior career*
Years	Team	Apps	(Gls)
2002–2010	Shanghai Shenhua	167	(8)
2010–2012	Hangzhou Greentown	27	(0)

International career^{‡}
2007–2008	China	3	(0)
Medal record
Men's football
Representing China
East Asian Games
Gold medal – first place	2001 Macau	Football
AFC Youth Championship
Bronze medal – third place	2000 َ Iran	Team
- * Club domestic league appearances and goals as of 1 Jan 2012 ‡ National team caps and goals as of 18 September 2009

Sun Ji (Chinese: 孙吉; born January 15, 1982, in Shanghai) is a former Chinese international football player who played as a defender for Shanghai Shenhua along with his identical twin brother and also fellow international footballer Sun Xiang before leaving the club to join Hangzhou Greentown where he ended his career.

== Club career ==
=== Shanghai ===
Sun Ji and his identical twin brother Sun Xiang both began their football career playing for Shanghai 02 before the club were taken over by Shanghai Shenhua. They would both graduate to the senior team at the beginning of the 2002 league season and they would both quickly establish themselves as important members within the squad. Sun Ji would personally play in 26 league games and score 2 goals for the team. The following season was to see Sun Ji further establish himself within the team and even help them win the 2003 league title. Unfortunately in 2013 the Chinese Football Association would revoke the league title after it was discovered the Shenhua General manager Lou Shifang had bribed officials to be bias to Shenhua in games that season. Sun Ji continued to be a vital part of the Shanghai team for several more seasons and he attracted attention from Eredivisie champions PSV Eindhoven who invited him and his twin brother, Sun Xiang on trial in November, 2006. PSV coach Ronald Koeman was not satisfied by their performances and did not accept either Sun brother to the PSV team. However, Koeman did not find a satisfactory replacement for left-back over the winter transfer window, so PSV recalled Sun Xiang. Sun Ji returned to Shanghai Shenhua where he continued to be major part of their team.

=== Hangzhou Greentown ===
It was confirmed on the website of Shanghai Shenhua that he completed the transfer to Hangzhou Greentown on February 12, 2010. His move would reunite him with his former Shanghai Shenhua manager Wu Jingui and he would quickly establish himself as a vital member within the team as well as also aiding his new club to their best ever finish of fourth and a chance to play in the AFC Champions League for the first time. Due to spinal injury he retired from playing in 2013.

== International career ==
Sun Ji would make his international debut on February 2, 2007, against Kazakhstan in a friendly game in preparation for the 2007 AFC Asian Cup, which China won 2-1. While he wasn't called up to the Asian Cup squad he would make another appearance for China against Mexico on April 16, 2008, in a 1-0 friendly defeat. This was followed by another friendly on April 23, 2008, against El Salvador in a 2-2 draw.

== Honours ==
Shanghai Shenhua

- Chinese Jia-A League: 2003 (revoked due to match-fixing scandal)
