= Yao Lijun =

Chinese footballer

Yao Lijun 姚力君
Personal information
- Date of birth: 2 October 1981 (age 45)
- Place of birth: Haining, Zhejiang, China
- Height: 1.78 m (5 ft 10 in)
- Position: Right-back

Youth career
- 1995–1999: Shanghai 02

Senior career*
Years	Team	Apps	(Gls)
2000–2001	Shanghai 02	12	(0)
2002–2010	Shanghai Shenhua	56	(0)
- * Club domestic league appearances and goals as of 1 Jan 2012

Yao Lijun (Chinese: 姚力君; pinyin: Yáo Lìjūn born on 2 October 1981 in Haining, Zhejiang) is a former Chinese football player who played the majority of his career as a defender for Shanghai Shenhua.

== Club career ==
Yao Lijun began his football career playing for Shanghai 02 where his impressive displays for the club would see him captain the team to numerous youth championships, before joining their senior team that took part in the third tier in the 2000 Chinese league season. After playing in one league season with the club they were taken over by top tier side Shanghai Shenhua and he moved towards their senior team. After making his debut in 2002 he was a squad regular for Shanghai Shenhua where he could play as either right-back or centre-back, however due to his versatility he consistently had other players preferred to when fighting for competition of places, however despite that he was part of the team that went on to win the 2003 Chinese Jia-A League title. Unfortunately in 2013 the Chinese Football Association would revoke the league title after it was discovered the Shenhua General manager Lou Shifang had bribed officials to be bias to Shenhua in games that season. By the beginning of the 2007 league season Shenhua had merged with local rivals Shanghai United F.C. and with the exceptionally large squad Yao would gradually gain even less playing time until in 2010 he was dropped to the reserve team.

== Honours ==
Shanghai Shenhua

- Chinese Jia-A League: 2003 (revoked due to match-fixing scandal)
