= Ye Chongqiu =

Chinese footballer (born 1992)

Ye Chongqiu 叶重秋
Personal information
- Date of birth: 29 September 1992 (age 34)
- Place of birth: Shanghai, China
- Height: 1.79 m (5 ft 10 1/2 in)
- Position: Midfielder

Youth career
- Nanchang Hengyuan

Senior career*
| Years | Team | Apps | (Gls) |
| 2010–2018 | Shanghai Shenxin | 163 | (3) |
| 2019–2020 | Jiangsu Suning | 7 | (0) |
| 2021–2022 | Wuhan Yangtze River | 51 | (0) |
| 2023 | Ji'nan Xingzhou | 28 | (0) |
| 2024 | Guangxi Pingguo Haliao | 13 | (0) |
- * Club domestic league appearances and goals as of 17 February 2023

Ye Chongqiu (Chinese: 叶重秋; pinyin: Yè Chóngqiū; born 29 September 1992 in Shanghai) is a Chinese football player.

== Club career ==
Ye started his professional football career in 2010 when he was promoted to Chinese Super League newcomer Nanchang Hengyuan's first team squad. On 14 July 2010, he made his senior debut in a goalless draw against Liaoning Whowin, aging 17 years and 288 days, which made him the youngest player in the club's history. Ye became a regular player in the team in the 2011 season. On 10 July 2011, he scored his winning goal near the end of the match against Hangzhou Greentown, which ensured Nanchang's 1–0 home victory. He was demoted to the reserve team in the summer of 2018.

On 22 February 2019, Ye transferred to Super League side Jiangsu Suning, signing a four-year contract.

== Career statistics ==
Statistics accurate as of match played 31 December 2022.

Appearances and goals by club, season and competition
| Club | Season | League | | | National Cup | | Continental | | Other | | Total | |
| Club | Season | Division | Apps | Goals | Apps | Goals | Apps | Goals | Apps | Goals | Apps | Goals |
|---|---|---|---|---|---|---|---|---|---|---|---|---|
| Shanghai Shenxin | 2010 | Chinese Super League | 7 | 0 | - | | - | | - | | 7 | 0 |
| Shanghai Shenxin | 2011 | Chinese Super League | 22 | 1 | 2 | 0 | - | | - | | 24 | 1 |
| Shanghai Shenxin | 2012 | Chinese Super League | 22 | 1 | 1 | 0 | - | | - | | 23 | 1 |
| Shanghai Shenxin | 2013 | Chinese Super League | 11 | 0 | 2 | 0 | - | | - | | 13 | 0 |
| Shanghai Shenxin | 2014 | Chinese Super League | 22 | 0 | 2 | 0 | - | | - | | 24 | 0 |
| Shanghai Shenxin | 2015 | Chinese Super League | 24 | 0 | 1 | 0 | - | | - | | 25 | 0 |
| Shanghai Shenxin | 2016 | China League One | 28 | 1 | 0 | 0 | - | | - | | 28 | 1 |
| Shanghai Shenxin | 2017 | China League One | 27 | 0 | 4 | 0 | - | | - | | 31 | 0 |
| Shanghai Shenxin | 2018 | China League One | 0 | 0 | 0 | 0 | - | | - | | 0 | 0 |
| Shanghai Shenxin | Total | | 163 | 3 | 12 | 0 | 0 | 0 | 0 | 0 | 175 | 3 |
| Jiangsu Suning | 2019 | Chinese Super League | 7 | 0 | 2 | 0 | - | | - | | 9 | 0 |
| Jiangsu Suning | 2020 | Chinese Super League | 0 | 0 | 4 | 0 | - | | - | | 4 | 0 |
| Jiangsu Suning | Total | | 7 | 0 | 6 | 0 | 0 | 0 | 0 | 0 | 13 | 0 |
| Wuhan/ Wuhan Yangtze River | 2021 | Chinese Super League | 19 | 0 | 4 | 0 | - | | - | | 23 | 0 |
| Wuhan/ Wuhan Yangtze River | 2022 | Chinese Super League | 28 | 0 | 0 | 0 | - | | - | | 28 | 0 |
| Wuhan/ Wuhan Yangtze River | Total | | 47 | 0 | 4 | 0 | 0 | 0 | 0 | 0 | 51 | 0 |
| Career total | | | 217 | 3 | 22 | 0 | 0 | 0 | 0 | 0 | 230 | 3 |

== Honours ==
=== Club ===
Jiangsu Suning

- Chinese Super League: 2020
