= Aziz Ibragimov =

Uzbekistani footballer

Personal information
- Date of birth: 21 July 1986 (age 40)
- Place of birth: G'uzor, Uzbek SSR, Soviet Union
- Height: 1.76 m (5 ft 9 in)
- Position: Defender

Senior career*
Years	Team	Apps	(Gls)
2004–2005	Traktor Tashkent	16	(0)
2005	Shurtan Guzar	11	(0)
2006–2007	Mash'al Mubarek		
2007–2008	Slovan Bratislava	29	(5)
2008–2011	Bohemians 1905	45	(2)
2011–2012	Qingdao Jonoon	39	(4)
2013	Baník Most	9	(3)
2013	Dynamo České Budějovice	4	(0)
2013–2014	Bohemians Prague	16	(2)
2014	Andijan	12	(3)
2015	Dinamo Samarqand	14	(4)
2015–2017	Buxoro	43	(16)
2017	Machine Sazi	9	(0)
2017	Spartaks Jūrmala	11	(1)
2018	Buxoro	29	(2)
2019	Navbahor Namangan	16	(3)
2020	Surkhon Termez	8	(1)
2020–2022	Buxoro	6	(1)
2022–2023	Turon Yaypan		

International career
2007–2011	Uzbekistan	17	(3)
- * Club domestic league appearances and goals as of 17:26, 14 February 2021 (UTC)

Aziz Ibragimov (also spelled Ibrahimov, born 21 July 1986) is a former Uzbekistani footballer who played as a defender.

Ibragimov played for various clubs in his native Uzbekistan, as well as in Slovakia, the Czech Republic, China, Iran and Latvia. Between 2007 and 2011, he won 17 caps for the Uzbekistan national team, scoring 3 goals, including one at the 2007 AFC Asian Cup.

== Career statistics ==
=== International ===
Appearances and goals by national team and year
National team	Year	Apps	Goals
Uzbekistan	2007	6	2
Uzbekistan	2008	6	1
Uzbekistan	2009	4	0
Uzbekistan	2010	–	
Uzbekistan	2011	1	0
Total		17	3

Scores and results list Uzbekistan goal tally first, score column indicates score after each Ibragimov goal.

List of international goals scored by Aziz Ibragimov
No.	Date	Venue	Opponent	Score	Result	Competition
1	2 July 2007	Paju National Football Center, Paju, South Korea	Iraq	1–0	2–0	Friendly
2	14 July 2007	Bukit Jalil National Stadium, Kuala Lumpur, Malaysia	Malaysia	4–0	5–0	2007 AFC Asian Cup
3	2 June 2008	National Stadium, Kallang, Singapore	Singapore	6–2	7–3	2014 FIFA World Cup qualification
