= Xu Wen (footballer) =

Chinese footballer

Xu Wen 徐文
Personal information
- Full name: Xu Wen
- Date of birth: April 13, 1986 (age 40)
- Place of birth: Shanghai, China PR
- Height: 1.77 m (5 ft 9 1/2 in)
- Positions: Defensive midfielder; defender

Youth career
- Shanghai Shenhua

Senior career*
Years	Team	Apps	(Gls)
2006	Shanghai Shenhua	0	(0)
2009–2016	Shanghai Shenxin	95	(1)

International career
2003	China U-17	1	(0)
- * Club domestic league appearances and goals as of 22 October 2016

Xu Wen (Chinese: 徐文), born April 13, 1986, in Shanghai), is a versatile Chinese footballer, who plays as either a defensive midfielder or defender.

== Club career ==
As a youngster Xu Wen would participate in the 2005 National Games of China as well as playing for the Shanghai Shenhua youth team before he would graduate to the senior team during the 2006 league season where he was given the number 25 shirt. A toe injury would see his progression halted before the merger with Shanghai United F.C. and the significant increase in the squad size saw him return to youth and reserve teams. He would leave the club to gain more playing opportunities and join second tier side Nanchang Bayi where during the 2009 league season he would establish himself as a vital member within the teams push for promotion to the top tier when they came runners-up in the division.

== Club career stats ==
Statistics accurate as of match played 22 October 2016

Season	Team	Country	Division	Apps	Goals
2006	Shanghai Shenhua	China	1	0	0
2009	Nanchang Bayi	China	2	12	0
2010	Nanchang Bayi	China	1	20	0
2011	Nanchang Bayi	China	1	21	1
2012	Shanghai Shenxin	China	1	23	0
2013	Shanghai Shenxin	China	1	7	0
2014	Shanghai Shenxin	China	1	8	0
2015	Shanghai Shenxin	China	1	1	0
2016	Shanghai Shenxin	China	2	3	0
