= Zheng Wei =

Chinese footballer

Zheng Wei 郑伟
Personal information
- Date of birth: June 13, 1981 (age 45)
- Place of birth: Qingdao, China
- Height: 1.83 m (6 ft 0 in)
- Position: Midfielder

Youth career
- 1995–1999: Shanghai 02

Senior career*
Years	Team	Apps	(Gls)
2000–2001	Shanghai 02	12	(0)
2002–2006	Shanghai Shenhua	8	(0)
2006	Shanghai Zobon (Loan)	21	(4)
2007–2010	Shaanxi Baorong Chanba	68	(2)
2011	Shanghai Shenhua	1	(0)
2011–2013	Chongqing F.C.	22	(1)
- * Club domestic league appearances and goals as of 1 July 2011 (UTC)

Zheng Wei (Chinese: 郑伟; born June 13, 1981, in Qingdao) is a Chinese football player.

== Professional career ==
=== Shanghai Shenhua ===
Zheng Wei started his football career with Shanghai 02 before the club were taken over by Shanghai Shenhua in 2002. Despite being promoted to Shenhua's senior team in 2002, he would have to wait until the 2004 league season before he could make his debut. He would eventually play in 5 league games for Shanghai in the 2004 league season. This however was to prove his most successful season with Shanghai, and despite staying with them for a further two seasons he could only make a further 3 appearances for them.

=== Shanxi Baorong Chanba ===
Zheng Wei would have a loan period with Shanghai Zobon for one season before he would move to Shaanxi Baorong Chanba at the beginning of the 2007 league season where he immediately established himself as a versatile left midfielder and defensive midfielder. An immediate regular he would play in 23 league games in his debut season and see Shaanxi fight off relegation. With a fresh start in the 2008 league season, Zheng would spearhead the Shaanxi midfield that would fight for the league title, however despite an encouraging start to the season Shaanxi, finished fifth in the league. With the team unable to improve upon the previous season's results the club brought in Zhu Guanghu and then Milorad Kosanović to manage the team and Zheng saw his playing time reduced. By the end of the 2010 league season Zheng would be allowed to leave the club and he would return to Shanghai Shenhua.
