= Du Wei (footballer) =

Chinese footballer

Du Wei 杜威
Personal information
- Date of birth: 9 February 1982 (age 44)
- Place of birth: Luoyang, Henan, China
- Height: 1.87 m (6 ft 2 in)
- Position: Centre-back

Youth career
- 1995–2001: Shanghai 02

Senior career*
Years	Team	Apps	(Gls)
2002–2010	Shanghai Shenhua	159	(12)
2005–2006	→ Celtic (loan)	0	(0)
2010–2012	Hangzhou Greentown	66	(9)
2012–2014	Shandong Luneng	46	(6)
2015–2017	Hebei China Fortune	48	(3)
2017	→ Guizhou Zhicheng (loan)	12	(1)
2018	Guizhou Hengfeng	8	(2)

International career
2000–2001	China U20		
2002–2003	China U23		
2001–2016	China	71	(4)
Medal record
Representing China
Men's football
EAFF Championship
Bronze medal – third place	2003 Japan	Team
Gold medal – first place	2010 Japan	Team
Silver medal – second place	2013 South Korea	Team
East Asian Games
Gold medal – first place	2001 Macau	Football
AFC Youth Championship
Bronze medal – third place	2000 َ Iran	Team
- * Club domestic league appearances and goals

Du Wei (Chinese: 杜威; pinyin: Dù Wēi; Mandarin pronunciation: [tû wéɪ]; born 9 February 1982) is a Chinese former professional footballer who played as a centre-back.

He played for the China national team in their participation in the 2002 FIFA World Cup. This saw foreign interests come from Scottish Premier League side Celtic in the form of a loan, however an extension to the loan was never taken up and he returned to Shanghai Shenhua where he captained them for several seasons before joining Hangzhou Greentown and Shandong Luneng as well as captaining his national team in the 2011 AFC Asian Cup.

== Club career ==
Du Wei started his football career in 2000 playing for third-tier side Shanghai 02 where he was able to play at centre back or defensive midfield before the club were taken over by top-tier side Shanghai Shenhua in 2002. At Shenhua, he immediately commanded a regular position within the team and by his second season with them he won the last Chinese Jia-A League league title in 2003 before it was renamed as the Chinese Super League; however, the Chinese Football Association later revoked the title in 2013 after it was discovered the team's general manager Lou Shifang had bribed officials to be biased towards Shenhua in certain matches that season.

Du missed much of the season through injury and the team missed his services, finishing tenth within the league. When he returned from injury, his impressive displays for Shenhua saw Scottish Premier League side Celtic interested in him and his agent Edmund Chu oversaw his move to the club during the 2005–06 season, on a six-month short-term contract, which was hoped to lead to a long-term contract. At Celtic, he made several appearances on the bench before he finally made his debut in the Scottish Cup third round tie against Clyde on 9 January 2006 in a shock 2–1 defeat. His uninspiring first team debut saw him substituted at half time by Celtic manager Gordon Strachan. In this game he conceded a penalty and made a defensive mistake leading to Clyde's second goal. After that display, he was dropped from the team and his loan was cut short with him returning to Shenhua.

Returning to Shenhua, Du continued to command a regular starting place within the team and eventually became the team's captain by the 2008 league season, however after a disappointing 2009 campaign where the club finished in fifth place, the club were willing to listen for offers on him. After a protracted transfer period, he joined top-tier side Hangzhou Greentown on 10 March 2010 where he continued wearing the shirt number 5 for the following season. He was also named as the club's captain and was partnered with his previous teammate Ng Wai Chiu. He helped guide the club to their best ever league position of fourth and a chance to play in the AFC Champions League for the first time. Leading Hangzhou to their first ever AFC Champions League campaign, he played in five games as they were knocked out in the group stages; however, this was to prove to be the highlight of his career with them as the club couldn't improve upon their previous season league campaign and finished in eighth.

On 3 July 2012, Du was allowed to transfer to fellow top-tier side Shandong Luneng. On 7 July 2012, he was immediately placed within the team and made his debut for the club in a 3–1 win against Guizhou Renhe where he also scored his first goal for the club.

On 15 February 2015, he signed a two-year contract with China League One side Hebei China Fortune.

On 27 June 2017, he joined Guizhou Hengfeng Zhicheng on loan. He made a permanent transfer to Guizhou Hengfeng on 26 February 2018.

== International career ==
Du captained the Chinese under-20 national team and lead them into the 2001 FIFA World Youth Championship in Argentina where they were knocked out in the last sixteen by Argentina. His performance within the tournament saw him win the Asian Young Footballer of the Year award and he then rapidly rose through the Chinese youth teams to graduate into the senior China national team when he made his debut against Trinidad and Tobago in a friendly on 5 August 2001 in a game that China won 3–0. This led to several further games and despite his lack of experience he was called up into the squad that played at the 2002 FIFA World Cup. Due to injury, he was dropped from the national team in the 2004 AFC Asian Cup that reached the final where Arie Haan preferred to play Zheng Zhi in defence. Du was able to regain his position within the national team after the tournament and was recalled for the 2007 AFC Asian Cup squad. When Gao Hongbo became the new manager of the national team, he chose Du as his captain and he led China to win the 2010 East Asian Football Championship.

== Career statistics ==
=== Club ===
As of match played 11 November 2018

Appearances and goals by club, season and competition
Club	Season	League			National cup (Note: Includes Chinese FA Cup, Scottish Cup.)		League cup (Note: Includes Chinese Super League Cup, Scottish League Cup.)		Continental		Other (Note: Includes Chinese FA Super Cup, A3 Champions Cup.)		Total	
Club	Season	Division	Apps	Goals	Apps	Goals	Apps	Goals	Apps	Goals	Apps	Goals	Apps	Goals
Shanghai Shenhua	2002	Chinese Jia-A League	24	0		0	–			0	–		24	0
Shanghai Shenhua	2003	Chinese Jia-A League	23	1		0	–		–		0	0	23	1
Shanghai Shenhua	2004	Chinese Super League	14	1		0		0		0	0	0	14	1
Shanghai Shenhua	2005	Chinese Super League	17	1		0		0	–		–		17	1
Celtic (loan)	2005–06	Scottish Premier League	0	0	1	0	0	0	0	0	–		1	0
Shanghai Shenhua	2006	Chinese Super League	19	2	2	1	–			0	–		21	3
Shanghai Shenhua	2007	Chinese Super League	15	1	–		–		1	0	2	0	18	1
Shanghai Shenhua	2008	Chinese Super League	27	3	–		–		–		–		27	3
Shanghai Shenhua	2009	Chinese Super League	20	3	–		–		3	0	–		23	3
Hangzhou Greentown	2010	Chinese Super League	27	3	–		–		–		–		27	3
Hangzhou Greentown	2011	Chinese Super League	25	2	1	0	–		5	0	–		31	2
Hangzhou Greentown	2012	Chinese Super League	14	4	0	0	–		–		–		14	4
Shandong Luneng	2012	Chinese Super League	15	4	3	0	–		–		–		18	4
Shandong Luneng	2013	Chinese Super League	21	2	0	0	–		–		–		21	2
Shandong Luneng	2014	Chinese Super League	10	0	0	0	–		5	1	–		15	1
Hebei China Fortune	2015	China League One	26	4	1	1	–		–		–		27	5
Hebei China Fortune	2016	Chinese Super League	21	0	2	2	–		–		–		23	2
Hebei China Fortune	2017	Chinese Super League	1	0	1	0	–		–		–		2	0
Guizhou Zhicheng (loan)	2017	Chinese Super League	12	1	0	0	–		–		–		12	1
Guizhou Hengfeng	2018	Chinese Super League	8	2	1	0	–		–		–		9	2
Career total			339	34	12	4	0	0	14	1	2	0	367	39

=== International ===
Scores and results list China's goal tally first, score column indicates score after each Du goal.

List of international goals scored by Du Wei
No.	Date	Venue	Opponent	Score	Result	Competition
1	22 February 2006	Guangzhou, China	Palestine	1–0	2–0	2007 AFC Asian Cup qualification
2	21 January 2009	Hangzhou, China	Vietnam	3–1	6–1	2011 AFC Asian Cup qualification
3	22 November 2009	Hangzhou, China	Lebanon	1–0	1–0	2011 AFC Asian Cup qualification
4	18 December 2010	Zhuhai, China	Estonia	1–0	3-0	Friendly

== Honours ==
Shanghai Shenhua

- A3 Champions Cup: 2007

Shandong Luneng

- Chinese FA Cup: 2014

China

- East Asian Football Championship: 2010

Individual

- Chinese Super League Team of the Year: 2012
