= Wang Jiayu =

Chinese footballer

Wang Jiayu 王佳玉
Personal information
- Date of birth: 28 September 1990 (age 36)
- Place of birth: Shanghai, China
- Height: 1.75 m (5 ft 9 in)
- Position: Midfielder

Youth career
- 2000–2005: Genbao Football Academy

Senior career*
Years	Team	Apps	(Gls)
2006–2010	Shanghai East Asia	67	(14)
2011–2013	Shanghai Shenxin	69	(1)
2014–2017	Shanghai SIPG	29	(1)
2015	→ Hangzhou Greentown (loan)	1	(0)

International career
2005–2006	China U17		
2007–2009	China U20		
2010–2011	China U23		
- * Club domestic league appearances and goals as of 1 November 2016

Wang Jiayu (Chinese: 王佳玉; pinyin: Wáng Jiāyù; born 28 September 1990 in Shanghai) is a former Chinese football player who played as a midfielder.

== Club career ==
Born in Shanghai, Wang joined Genbao Football Academy in 2000 and was promoted to Shanghai East Asia squad in 2006 for the China League Two campaign. He played as a regular starter and became the captain within the team as Shanghai East Asia won promotion to the second tier in the 2007 season.

On 10 December 2010, Wang transferred to Chinese Super League side Nanchang Hengyuan along with his teammate Jiang Zhipeng for a total fee of ¥6 million. He made 27 league appearances in the 2011 season, which secured Nanchang's stay in the top flight for the next season. Wang followed the club to move to Shanghai in 2012. On 27 October 2012, he scored his first Super League goal in a 1–1 home draw against Shandong Luneng Taishan.

On 29 December 2013, Wang returned to Shanghai East Asia. He failed to establish himself within the team after Sven-Göran Eriksson became the manager of the club in the 2015 season. On 22 June 2015, Wang was loaned to fellow Super League side Hangzhou Greentown for half season. Wang was degraded to Shanghai SIPG's reserve squad in the summer of 2016. Wang joined Segunda División B side Lorca FC, which owned by Xu Genbao, as an unregister player in March 2017. Wang made a trail with Réunion Premier League side AS Excelsior at the recommendation of former Shanghai East Asia manager Claude Lowitz in May 2017. However, he failed to pass the trial in June 2017.

== Career statistics ==
As of 1 November 2016

Club performance			League		Cup		League Cup		Continental		Total	
Season	Club	League	Apps	Goals	Apps	Goals	Apps	Goals	Apps	Goals	Apps	Goals
China PR			League		FA Cup		CSL Cup		Asia		Total	
2006	Shanghai East Asia	China League Two			-		-		-			
2007	Shanghai East Asia	China League Two			-		-		-			
2008	Shanghai East Asia	China League One	23	6	-		-		-		23	6
2009	Shanghai East Asia	China League One	22	4	-		-		-		22	4
2010	Shanghai East Asia	China League One	22	4	-		-		-		22	4
2011	Shanghai Shenxin	Chinese Super League	27	0	2	0	-		-		29	0
2012	Shanghai Shenxin	Chinese Super League	21	1	0	0	-		-		21	1
2013	Shanghai Shenxin	Chinese Super League	21	0	2	0	-		-		23	0
2014	Shanghai East Asia	Chinese Super League	28	1	0	0	-		-		28	1
2015	Shanghai East Asia	Chinese Super League	1	0	1	0	-		-		2	0
2015	Hangzhou Greentown	Chinese Super League	1	0	1	0	-		-		2	0
2016	Shanghai SIPG	Chinese Super League	0	0	0	0	-		0	0	0	0
Total	China PR		166	16	6	0	0	0	0	0	172	16

== Honours ==
Shanghai East Asia

- China League Two: 2007

Sporting positions
Preceded by Zhang Zhi	Shanghai East Asia captain 2007–2010	Succeeded by Wang Shenchao
