= Wang Bo (footballer, born 1985) =

Chinese footballer

Wang Bo 王博
Personal information
- Full name: Wang Bo
- Date of birth: January 23, 1985 (age 41)
- Place of birth: Hubei, China
- Height: 1.76 m (5 ft 9 in)
- Position: Midfielder

Senior career*
Years	Team	Apps	(Gls)
2005–2014	Shanghai Shenxin	79	(6)
2013	→ Hubei China-Kyle (loan)	23	(1)
- * Club domestic league appearances and goals

Wang Bo (Chinese: 王博, born January 23, 1985) is a Chinese professional footballer who plays as a midfielder.

== Club career ==
Wang Bo would start his career playing for third-tier football club Nanchang Bayi Hengyuan in the 2005 Chinese league season and was part of the squad that won the division title. By the 2009 league season he would then be part of the team that came runner-up of the Chinese League One division and the team won promotion to the Chinese Super League for the first time. With the club he would aid them in their attempts to avoid relegation for the next several seasons until the team moved to Shanghai in 2012 and renamed themselves Shanghai Shenxin where Wang Bo would join them.

After spending much of the 2012 Chinese Super League season sitting on the bench for the second season running it was decided that Wang Bo should go on loan to recently promoted second-tier club Hubei China-Kyle F.C. for the whole of the 2013 Chinese league season.

== Career statistics ==
Season	Team	Country	Division	Apps	Goals
2005	Nanchang Bayi	China	3		
2006	Nanchang Bayi	China	2	15	1
2007	Nanchang Bayi	China	2	1	0
2008	Nanchang Bayi	China	2	23	1
2009	Nanchang Bayi	China	2	24	4
2010	Nanchang Bayi	China	1	15	0
2011	Nanchang Bayi	China	1	0	0
2012	Shanghai Shenxin	China	1	1	0
2013	Hubei China-Kyle	China	2	23	1
2014	Shanghai Shenxin	China	1	0	0

Statistics accurate as of match played 12 November 2014

== Honours ==
Shanghai Shenxin

- China League Two: 2005
