= Zhu Jiong =

Chinese footballer and manager

Zhu Jiong 朱炯
Personal information
- Full name: Zhu Jiong
- Date of birth: 5 August 1973 (age 53)
- Place of birth: Shanghai, China
- Height: 1.70 m (5 ft 7 in)
- Position: Left back

Team information
- Current team: Meizhou Hakka (head coach)

Youth career
- Shanghai Youth

Senior career*
| Years | Team | Apps | (Gls) |
| 1994–1999 | Shanghai Shenhua | 45 | (3) |

Managerial career
- 2009–2013: Shanghai Shenxin
- 2014–2015: Guizhou Renhe
- 2018–2019: Shanghai Shenxin
- 2019–2020: Qingdao Jonoon
- 2021: Yunnan Yukun Steel
- 2023–2025: Guizhou Zhucheng Athletic
- 2025: Kunming City
- 2026–: Meizhou Hakka
- * Club domestic league appearances and goals

Zhu Jiong (Chinese: 朱炯; born 5 August 1973) is a Chinese football manager and former player who is the current head coach of Meizhou Hakka.

== Club career ==
Zhu Jiong began his career playing for Shanghai Shenhua youth team and would graduate to the senior team during the dawn of full professionalism at the beginning of the 1994 Chinese Jia-A League season. His ability at left back would see him gain significant playing time and by the end of the 1995 Chinese Jia-A League season he would go on to win the league title with Shenhua. His career was cut short when it was discovered that what he and the club thought was a minor meniscus injury was in fact a major cruciate ligament, which ended his career.

== Management career ==
With his career cut short he would move into youth management and would receive his first major assignment in 2006 when he became the manager at the Shanghai Shenhua youth team. By 2007 he would move into assistant management when he joined Shaanxi Baorong Chanba where he was reunited with his old teammate from Shanghai Shenhua, Cheng Yaodong who was the club's manager. At the start of the 2009 Chinese league season Zhu got his first management position at second-tier club Nanchang Bayi Hengyuan and in his debut season helped guided the club to a runners-up spot and promotion to the top tier.

In August 2025, Zhu was appointed as the head coach of China League Two club Kunming City.

On 8 June 2026, Zhu was appointed as the head coach of China League One of Meizhou Hakka.

== Honours ==
=== Player ===
Shanghai Shenhua

- Chinese Jia-A League: 1995
