= Shanghai 02 F.C. =

Chinese football club

Shanghai 02 上海02
- Full name: Shanghai 02 F.C. 上海02足球俱乐部
- Founded: 1995; 30 years ago
- Dissolved: 2002; 23 years ago

Shanghai 02 F.C. is a defunct Chinese football club that was based in Shanghai, China.

== History ==
The club was founded by Xu Genbao in 1995 and was aimed at developing football talents for the participation of the 2002 World Cup, from which the club was named. In 2000, the club participated in China League Two for the first time, but was eliminated by Mianyang F.C. in the semi-finals and narrowly missed promotion to Jia B.

In 2002, the club was merged into Shanghai Shenhua after fulfilling its purpose. Besides successfully producing players such as Du Wei, Sun Ji, Sun Xiang, Yao Lijun, Yu Tao and Zheng Wei, this club, being the first football project by Xu Genbao, would later prove to be a valuable edifying lesson to him in football management, which was pivotal in the success of his following project, Shanghai East Asia—later known as Chinese Super League powerhouse Shanghai SIPG.

== Results ==
All-time League Rankings

Season	2000
Division	3
Position	4
