= Yu Tao =

Chinese footballer

Yu Tao 于涛
Personal information
- Full name: Yu Tao
- Date of birth: 15 October 1981 (age 45)
- Place of birth: Shanghai, China
- Height: 1.79 m (5 ft 10 in)
- Position: Midfielder

Youth career
- 1995–1999: Shanghai 02

Senior career*
Years	Team	Apps	(Gls)
2000–2001	Shanghai 02	12	(0)
2002–2012	Shanghai Shenhua	255	(17)
2013–2015	Shanghai Shenxin	82	(1)
2016–2018	Beijing Enterprises Group	51	(1)

International career^{‡}
2002–2011	China	11	(0)
Medal record
Representing China
Men's football
AFC Youth Championship
Bronze medal – third place	2000 َ Iran	Team
- * Club domestic league appearances and goals as of 3 November 2018 ‡ National team caps and goals as of 1 November 2015

Yu Tao (simplified Chinese: 于涛; traditional Chinese: 于濤; pinyin: Yú Tāo; born October 15, 1981, in Shanghai) is a Chinese former international football player as a midfielder.

== Club career ==
Yu Tao began his football career playing for Shanghai 02 before the club was taken over by Shanghai Shenhua and he was promoted to their senior side at the beginning of the 2002 league season, where he made twenty four league games and would score four goals. By the following season, he would become an integral member of the Shenhua team due to his ability to play in numerous positions in the midfield and would help them to win the league 2003 league title. Unfortunately in 2013 the Chinese Football Association would revoke the league title after it was discovered the Shenhua General manager Lou Shifang had bribed officials to be bias to Shenhua in games that season.

Despite several changes in management and the influx of players from the Shanghai United merger, Yu Tao has been a constant regular for Shanghai Shenhua throughout his career. By the 2010 league season his loyalty towards Shanghai would be rewarded when he was named the club's captain and on May 8, 2010, in a league game against Liaoning Whowin, he would become the club's most capped player when he made his one hundred and eighty sixth league appearance for the club. This was soon followed by him also reaching 200 league appearances for the club on August 29, 2010, in a league game against Dalian Shide, which ended in a 1–1 draw.

On 20 December 2012, Yu moved to Shanghai Shenxin on a free transfer, he signed a three-year deal with Shenxin. On 23 December 2015, Yu transferred to China League One side Beijing Enterprises Group on a free transfer.

== International career ==
Yu Tao would be called up into the Chinese managers Arie Haan's first game against Syria in a friendly on 7 December 2002 in a 3–1 win. After that game, he would become an irregular member for the national team, but this would not be enough to make the squad for the 2004 AFC Asian Cup. After several years in the international wilderness, the next Chinese manager Zhu Guanghu would call him up for a friendly against Kazakhstan on February 7, 2007, in a 2–1 victory. In preparation for the 2007 AFC Asian Cup, Zhu Guanghu included Yu Tao in several further squads but decided not in include him for the final tournament. The introduction of Gao Hongbo as the Chinese manager that saw Yu Tao given his chance of a competitive tournament when he was called him up for the 2011 AFC Asian Cup.

== Honours ==
Shanghai Shenhua

- Chinese Jia-A League: 2003 (revoked due to match-fixing scandal)
