= Kaironnisam Sahabudin =

Malaysian footballer (born 1979)

Personal information
- Full name: Muhamad Kaironnisam Sahabudin Hussain
- Date of birth: 10 May 1979 (age 47)
- Place of birth: Mergong, Kedah, Malaysia
- Height: 1.70 m (5 ft 7 in)
- Position: Defender

Senior career*
Years	Team	Apps	(Gls)
2003–2005	Perlis FA		
2005–2006	Selangor MPPJ		
2007–2009	UPB-MyTeam FC		
2010–2011	Felda United FC		
2012	Johor FC		
2013–2014	Felda United FC		

International career^{‡}
2001–2006	Malaysia U-23		
2001–2014	Malaysia	61	(2)
- * Club domestic league appearances and goals as of 30 August 2008 ‡ National team caps and goals as of 30 November 2008

Muhamad Kaironnisam Sahabudin Hussain (born 10 May 1979 in Mergong) is a Malaysian former footballer. He played as a defender.

He previously played for Perlis FA during 2003 until 2005. During 2004 season, he help Perlis to clinch their first Malaysia Cup title after 83 years trying to win it. After the Malaysia Cup success, he stayed with the Northern Lions and helped Perlis FA to win the Malaysia Super League. He also helped Perlis FA to become Malaysia Cup runners-up to Selangor FA. He also played for UPB-MyTeam, Johor FC and Felda United during his club career.

With Malaysia, Kaironnisam has represented the national team since Allan Harris era. With his partner Norhafiz Zamani Misbah they are well known in Malaysian football, and both of them partnered in an international matches. He has played in two Asian Games with Malaysia and three ASEAN Football Championship, and also captaining Malaysia in the 2007 AFC Asian Cup. He is also one of the players who earned silver medal in 2001 Southeast Asian Games.

His son, Firdaus Kaironnisam has played for the Malaysia national under-16 football team.

== International goals ==
#	Date	Venue	Opponent	Score	Result	Competition
1.	10 December 2004	Kuala Lumpur, Malaysia	Philippines	4-1	Won	2004 Tiger Cup Group Stage
2.	24 April 2006	Colombo, Sri Lanka	Sri Lanka	1-4	Won	Friendly
