= Cheng Yaodong =

Chinese footballer and manager

Cheng Yaodong 成耀东
Personal information
- Full name: Cheng Yaodong
- Date of birth: June 6, 1967 (age 59)
- Place of birth: Shanghai, China
- Height: 1.74 m (5 ft 8 1/2 in)
- Position: Defender

Team information
- Current team: Shanghai Port B (head coach)

Senior career*
Years	Team	Apps	(Gls)
1987–2000	Shanghai Shenhua		
2001–2003	Shanghai COSCO Huili		

International career
1989–1994	China		

Managerial career
- 2003–2009: Shanghai COSCO Huili
- 2011–2012: Shanghai Zobon
- 2013–2014: Shanghai Shenxin
- 2018–2024: China U22
- 2025–: Shanghai Port B
Medal record
Men's football
Representing China
AFC Asian Cup
Bronze medal – third place	1992 Japan	Team
- * Club domestic league appearances and goals

Cheng Yaodong (simplified Chinese: 成耀东; traditional Chinese: 成耀東; pinyin: Chéng Yàodōng; born June 6, 1967, in Shanghai) is a Chinese football manager and a former international football player.

As a player, he won the Chinese league and Cup with Shanghai Shenhua before ending his career with Shanghai COSCO Huili. After retiring, he would immediately go into management with Shanghai COSCO Huili who he coached for seven seasons before joining Chinese League Two club Shanghai Zobon followed by Shanghai Shenxin.

== Playing career ==
=== Club career ===
Cheng Yaodong started his football career with Shanghai in 1987 when they were originally a semi-professional football team. Predominantly used as a defender he would gradually establish himself within the Shanghai team for several seasons and would also see Shanghai become a professional football team in 1994 when they renamed themselves as Shanghai Shenhua. In the 1995 league season Cheng Yaodong would help Shanghai win the second fully professional league title. His loyalty to Shanghai would see him named as their captain by the 1998 league season and would win the 1998 Chinese FA Cup, however despite playing for Shenhua through the majority of his football career Cheng could not win more honours with the club. Nearing the end of his football career he would play for second-tier team Shanghai COSCO Huili and help them win the division title and promotion to the top tier in the 2001 league season.

=== International career ===
Cheng Yaodong's greatest international achievement came when he would be called into the Chinese squad to play in the 1992 AFC Asian Cup, which saw China come third in the tournament. Though he was squad player throughout his international career he did play in the tournament against Japan on November 6, 1992, in a 3–2 defeat.

== Management career ==
Nearing the end of his football career, Cheng was offered the chance to manage Shanghai COSCO Huili during the 2003 league season where he replaced Claude Le Roy and surprised many when he was able to steer them second in the league in his debut season and only one point off from the league title. The following season would see the club finish third within the league, however despite this the club could not continue to financially compete with local rivals Shanghai Shenhua and by the 2006 league season the club would move to Xi'an, Shaanxi and eventually change their name to Shaanxi Chanba. While Cheng would move with the club he was unable to replicate the same success he initially had and with the club being prudent in their spending he was only able to guide the club into mid-table positions for the next several seasons. This was halted for a short time when he guided the club to fifth in the 2008 league season, however on 28 August 2009, he surprisingly resigned after a 1–0 away win against the past Shanghai derby rivals Shanghai Shenhua, citing health problem and desire of studying abroad as reasons. While many among the public and media believed that due to his ties towards Shenhua, Cheng was seeking the possibility of replacing their coach Jia Xiuquan, however Shenhua decided to go with the experienced manager Miroslav Blažević and Cheng would return to Shanghai with third-tier club Shanghai Zobon at the beginning of the 2011 league season.

== Honours ==
=== Player ===
Shanghai Shenhua

- Chinese Jia-A League: 1995
- Chinese FA Cup: 1991, 1998

Shanghai COSCO Huili

- Chinese Jia-B League: 2001

=== Manager ===
- Chinese Jia-A League: 2003 (2nd Place)
