= Yang Jiawei =

Chinese footballer (born 1992)

Yang Jiawei 杨家威
Personal information
- Date of birth: 4 January 1992 (age 34)
- Place of birth: Linhai, Zhejiang, China
- Height: 1.82 m (5 ft 11 1/2 in)
- Position: Midfielder

Youth career
- 2003–2009: Shanghai Zhabei Jingwen Football School

Senior career*
Years	Team	Apps	(Gls)
2010–2015	Shanghai Shenxin	93	(7)
2016–2020	Jiangsu Suning	17	(0)
2019	→ Zibo Cuju (loan)	12	(5)
2020	→ Qingdao Jonoon (loan)	4	(1)
- * Club domestic league appearances and goals as of 31 December 2020

Yang Jiawei (Chinese: 杨家威; pinyin: Yáng Jiāwēi; born 4 January 1992) is a Chinese retired football player who played as midfielder.

== Club career ==
Yang started his professional football career in 2010 when he joined Chinese Super League side Nanchang Hengyuan. On 4 May 2011, he made his senior debut in the first round of 2011 Chinese FA Cup which Nanchang beat Beijing Institute of Technology 3–1. His Super League debut came on 31 July 2011, in a 1–0 home victory against Dalian Shide, coming on as a substitute for Pan Chaoran in the 59th minute. He followed the club to move to Shanghai in 2012. Yang scored his first senior goal on 17 June 2012, which ensured Shanghai Shenxin tied with Dalian Shide 1–1.

On 14 February 2016, Yang transferred to fellow Chinese Super League side Jiangsu Suning after Shanghai Shenxin's relegatione. He made his debut for Jiangsu on 15 March 2016 in a 0–0 away draw against FC Tokyo, coming on as a substitute for Ji Xiang in the 78th minute.

After the 2020 season, Jiangsu Suning was dissolved and Yang retired from professional football in the age of 29. Yang started his own adult football training center in Shanghai after the retirement.

== Career statistics ==
Statistics accurate as of match played 31 December 2020.

Appearances and goals by club, season and competition
Club	Season	League			National Cup		Continental		Other		Total	
Club	Season	Division	Apps	Goals	Apps	Goals	Apps	Goals	Apps	Goals	Apps	Goals
Shanghai Shenxin	2010	Chinese Super League	0	0	-		-		-		0	0
Shanghai Shenxin	2011	Chinese Super League	11	0	2	0	-		-		13	0
Shanghai Shenxin	2012	Chinese Super League	9	1	0	0	-		-		9	1
Shanghai Shenxin	2013	Chinese Super League	17	2	1	0	-		-		18	2
Shanghai Shenxin	2014	Chinese Super League	28	2	3	1	-		-		31	3
Shanghai Shenxin	2015	Chinese Super League	28	2	0	0	-		-		28	2
Shanghai Shenxin	Total		93	7	6	1	0	0	0	0	99	8
Jiangsu Suning	2016	Chinese Super League	12	0	3	0	3	0	0 (Note: Appearances in Chinese FA Super Cup)	0	18	0
Jiangsu Suning	2017	Chinese Super League	2	0	1	0	1	0	0	0	4	0
Jiangsu Suning	2018	Chinese Super League	4	0	1	0	-		-		5	0
Jiangsu Suning	Total		18	0	5	0	4	0	0	0	27	0
Zibo Cuju (loan)	2019	China League Two	12	5	0	0	-		-		12	5
Qingdao Jonoon (loan)	2020	China League Two	4	1	-		-		-		4	1
Career total			127	13	11	1	4	0	0	0	142	14
