= Sun Xiang =

Chinese footballer

Sun Xiang 孙祥
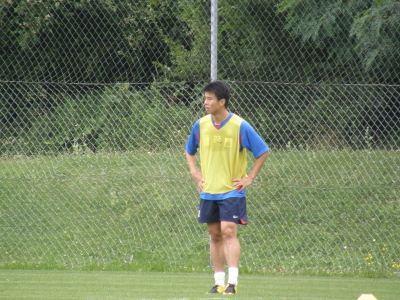
- Sun in 2008

Personal information
- Date of birth: 15 January 1982 (age 44)
- Place of birth: Shanghai, China
- Height: 1.80 m (5 ft 11 in)
- Position: Left-back

Youth career
- 1995–2001: Shanghai 02

Senior career*
Years	Team	Apps	(Gls)
2002–2010	Shanghai Shenhua	136	(13)
2007	→ PSV Eindhoven (loan)	5	(0)
2008–2009	→ Austria Wien (loan)	19	(2)
2010–2014	Guangzhou Evergrande	110	(3)
2015–2016	Shanghai SIPG	51	(0)
Total		321	(18)

International career
2000–2001	China U-20		
2002–2003	China U-23		
2002–2013	China	69	(5)

Managerial career
- 2017–: Shanghai Port（vice general manager）
- 2022: China (assistant)
Medal record
Representing China
Men's football
AFC Asian Cup
Silver medal – second place	2004 China	Team
EAFF Championship
Gold medal – first place	2005 South Korea	Team
Bronze medal – third place	2008 China	Team
Gold medal – first place	2010 Japan	Team
Silver medal – second place	2013 South Korea	Team
East Asian Games
Gold medal – first place	2001 Macau	Football
AFC Youth Championship
Bronze medal – third place	2000 َ Iran	Team
- * Club domestic league appearances and goals

Sun Xiang (Chinese: 孙祥; pinyin: Sūn Xiáng; Mandarin pronunciation: [swə́n ɕjǎŋ]; born 15 January 1982) is a Chinese former professional footballer who played as a left-back. He played for Shanghai Shenhua, Guangzhou Evergrande, Shanghai SIPG in his native country and spent time on loan at Dutch club PSV Eindhoven and Austrian club Austria Wien, he is the first Chinese player to play in the UEFA Champions League. At international level, he made 69 appearances for the China national team scoring 5 goals.

== Club career ==
=== Shanghai Shenhua ===
Sun Xiang started his football career playing for Shanghai 02 before the club was taken over by Shanghai Shenhua. He was then promoted to the club's first team in the 2002 season along with his twin brother Sun Ji where they both quickly established themselves within the team. In the 2003 season, he became the club's first-choice left back and won the top tier title with the club. In 2013 the Chinese Football Association revoked the league title after it was discovered the Shenhua General manager Lou Shifang had bribed officials to be bias to Shenhua in games that season.

=== PSV Eindhoven ===
Sun and his brother attracted the interests of multiple clubs abroad and had trials with Eredivisie side PSV Eindhoven in 2006, but PSV decided against signing both. The club then decided to sign Sun on loan for the 2006–07 season with an option to sign him on a three-year contract at the end of the season. He made his debut for the club on 17 February 2007 in a 2–0 win against Heracles Almelo, becoming the first ever Chinese footballer to play in the Eredivisie. He made his European continental debut on 20 February 2007 in a 1–0 win against Arsenal, becoming the first ever Chinese player to play in the UEFA Champions League. Then manager Ronald Koeman remarked that Sun had an impressive debut and contributed to the game through his good vision and precise passing. However, after the end of his loan, he was not offered a long-term contract.

=== Austria Wien ===
On 1 July 2008, Sun was loaned to Austrian Bundesliga side Austria Wien on a one-year deal with the possibility of a one-year extension, becoming the first ever Chinese footballer to play in the Austrian Bundesliga. He made his debut on 9 July 2008 in a 1–1 draw against SK Austria Kärnten. This was followed by his first league goal for the club on 7 March 2009 in a 4–0 victory against LASK Linz. When his loan period expired, he returned to Shanghai where he played for the remainder of the 2009 season.

=== Guangzhou Evergrande ===
On 28 April 2010, Sun announced that he gave up joining A-League side Sydney FC and transferred to second-tier side Guangzhou Evergrande instead. He made his debut for the club alongside Zheng Zhi on 21 July 2010 in a 10–0 win against Nanjing Yoyo. He scored his first goal for the club on 18 September 2010 in a 2–1 win against Yanbian FC. In the 2010 season, he made fourteen appearances as Guangzhou finished first place in the second tier and won promotion back to the top flight at the first attempt. The following season Sun continued to be a major part of the club that invested heavily in improving the squad; and with the club bringing in two-time Campeonato Brasileiro Série A Player of the Year winner Darío Conca, the club won its first ever top tier title in the 2011 season.

=== Shanghai SIPG ===
On 5 January 2015, Sun transferred to fellow Chinese Super League side Shanghai SIPG. He made his debut for the club on 7 March 2015 in a 2–1 win against Jiangsu Sainty. On 17 July 2016, Sun accidentally collided with Demba Ba and broke Ba's left leg in a 2–1 loss against Shanghai Shenhua. In December 2016, it was revealed that Sun was diagnosed as highly aggressive B-cell lymphoma. Sun did not clarify or confirm the report. On 6 February 2017, Shanghai SIPG announced Sun had left the club due to "physical problems".

== Career statistics ==
=== Club ===
As of 30 October 2016

Appearances and goals by club, season and competition
Club	Season	League			National cup		League cup		Continental		Other (Note: Includes A3 Champions Cup, Chinese FA Super Cup, FIFA Club World Cup)		Total	
Club	Season	Division	Apps	Goals	Apps	Goals	Apps	Goals	Apps	Goals	Apps	Goals	Apps	Goals
Shanghai 02	2000	China League Two			–		–		–		–			
Shanghai 02	2001	China League Two			–		–		–		–			
Shanghai 02	Total													
Shanghai Shenhua	2002	Chinese Jia-A League	25	2	1	0	–		3	0	2	0	31	2
Shanghai Shenhua	2003	Chinese Jia-A League	25	2	4	0	–		–		–		29	2
Shanghai Shenhua	2004	Chinese Super League	20	0	4	0	–		3	0	3	0	30	0
Shanghai Shenhua	2005	Chinese Super League	22	3	2	0	–		–		–		24	3
Shanghai Shenhua	2006	Chinese Super League	15	2	1	0	–		2	0	–		18	2
Shanghai Shenhua	2007	Chinese Super League	14	2	–		–		–		–		14	2
Shanghai Shenhua	2008	Chinese Super League	4	0	–		–		–		–		4	0
Shanghai Shenhua	2009	Chinese Super League	11	2	–		–		–		–		11	2
Shanghai Shenhua	2010	Chinese Super League	0	0	–		–		–		–		0	0
Shanghai Shenhua	Total		136	13	12	0	0	0	8	0	5	0	161	13
PSV Eindhoven (loan)	2006–07	Eredivisie	5	0	0	0	–		4	0	–		9	0
Austria Wien (loan)	2008–09	Austrian Bundesliga	19	2	4	1	–		4	0	–		27	3
Guangzhou Evergrande	2010	China League One	14	1	–		–		–		–		14	1
Guangzhou Evergrande	2011	Chinese Super League	25	1	–		–		–		–		25	1
Guangzhou Evergrande	2012	Chinese Super League	25	0	2	0	–		8	0	1	0	36	0
Guangzhou Evergrande	2013	Chinese Super League	23	1	4	0	–		14	0	4	0	45	1
Guangzhou Evergrande	2014	Chinese Super League	23	0	0	0	–		10	0	0	0	33	0
Guangzhou Evergrande	Total		110	3	6	0	0	0	32	0	5	0	153	3
Shanghai SIPG	2015	Chinese Super League	25	0	1	0	–		–		–		26	0
Shanghai SIPG	2016	Chinese Super League	26	0	1	0	–		7	0	–		34	0
Shanghai SIPG	Total		51	0	2	0	0	0	7	0	0	0	60	0
Career total			321	18	24	1	0	0	55	0	10	0	410	19

=== International ===
As of 6 October 2011

Scores and results list China's goal tally first, score column indicates score after each Sun goal.

List of international goals scored by Sun Xiang
#	Date	Venue	Opponent	Score	Result	Competition
1	19 June 2005	Helong Stadium, Changsha, China	Costa Rica	2–2	2–2	Friendly
2	31 July 2005	Daejeon World Cup Stadium, Daejeon, South Korea	South Korea	1–0	1–1	2005 East Asian Football Championship
3	11 October 2006	King Abdullah Stadium, Amman, Jordan	Palestine	2–0	2–0	2007 AFC Asian Cup qualifier
4	22 June 2008	Stadium Australia, Sydney, Australia	Australia	1–0	1–0	2010 FIFA World Cup qualifier
5	6 October 2011	New Shenzhen Stadium, Shenzhen, China	United Arab Emirates	1–0	2–1	Friendly

== Honours ==
Shanghai Shenhua

- Chinese FA Super Cup: 2002

PSV Eindhoven

- Eredivisie: 2006–07

Austria Wien

- Austrian Cup: 2008–09

Guangzhou Evergrande

- Chinese Super League: 2011, 2012, 2013, 2014
- Chinese League One: 2010
- Chinese FA Cup: 2012
- Chinese Super Cup: 2012
- AFC Champions League: 2013

China

- East Asian Football Championship: 2005, 2010

Individual

- Chinese Super League Team of the Year: 2005, 2012
- AFC Champions League Dream Team: 2013
