= Shanghai Shenxin F.C. =

Shanghai Shenxin Shànghǎi Shēnxīn 上海申鑫
- Full name: Shanghai Shenxin Football Club 上海申鑫足球俱乐部
- Founded: January 24, 2003; 23 years ago
- Dissolved: February 3, 2020; 6 years ago
- Ground: Jinshan Football Stadium, Shanghai
- Capacity: 30,000
- Chairman: Xu Guoliang (徐国良)
- Manager: Zhu Jiong
- League: China League One
- 2019: League One, 16th (relegated)
- Website: http://www.shenxinfc.sh.cn/
Home colours	Away colours	Third colours

Shanghai Shenxin Football Club (Chinese: 上海申鑫; pinyin: Shànghǎi Shēnxīn) was a professional football club that participated in China's football league system between 2003 and 2019 under licence from the Chinese Football Association (CFA). The team was based in Jinshan District, Shanghai and their home stadium was the Jinshan Football Stadium that has a seating capacity of 30,000. Their majority shareholder was Chinese real estate company Hengyuan Corporation.

The club was founded in 2003 as Shanghai Jinmao Football Club, later renamed Shanghai Hengyuan Football Club, before they made their debut in the third tier of China's football league pyramid in the 2003 league season. When the People's Liberation Army dismissed part of its sports branch, which included its football team the club became interested in acquiring it before ultimately buying their youth team. On April 2, 2004, a new club named Nanchang Bayi Hengyuan Football Club was established with players who had played for the Shanghai Hengyuan Football Club and the Bayi U-19 team. The club worked its way up to the top tier after coming runners-up in the second division during the 2009 league season and promotion to the Chinese Super League. The club name changed to "Nanchang Hengyuan Football Club" at 2010 summer, because the word "Bayi" (means People's Liberation Army) used by enterprise is prohibited from 2009. After almost eight years in Nanchang the club would decide to move back to Shanghai at the beginning of 2012 and renamed themselves Shanghai Shenxin Football Club.

== History ==
Shanghai Shenxin in 2003

In 2003 Shanghai Jinmao Football Club was founded in the Zhabei District of Shanghai by Jinmao Group and the local FA. Before the club was able to participate in the 2003 China League Two, Jinmao Group withdrew from the position of the main shareholder of the club, which was filled in by Shanghai real estate company Hengyuan Corporation, and the club was in turn renamed Shanghai Hengyuan Football Club. In their first season, they failed to reach the finals at the end of the campaign. During this period top-tier side Bayi FC were in financial difficulties. Shanghai Hengyuan were interested to taking over the entire club especially their position in the top tier of the Chinese football pyramid, however this was unable to be achieved because many of the first team had already left the club. Shanghai Hengyuan then concentrated on buying Bayi's youth team and on April 2, 2004, a new club named Nanchang Bayi Hengyuan Football Club was established with players who had played for the Shanghai Hengyuan Football Club and the Bayi U-19 team. The club moved to Nanchang, Jiangxi and play at the 26,000 seater Nanchang Bayi Stadium to take advantage of the region's lack of football representation, yet strong support. Playing at the bottom of the Chinese football pyramid in the third tier the club brought in Li Xiao to manage the team. He quickly guided the team to win the Yi League in 2005 and promotion to the Jia League. After this achievement Li Xiao became the club's vice-chairman. High-profile managers Zhou Suian and then Zhou Bo came to manage the team with little success. Li Xiao returned to manage the team until November 27, 2008, when he decided to resign at the end the season.

The club then brought in Zhu Jiong who despite having a slow start to the season quickly guided the club to a runners-up position and promotion to the Chinese Super League for the first time in the club's history. The club struggled to settle within the league, until Chen Zhizhao's ten league goals enabled the team to narrowly avoid relegation when they finished thirteenth within the league. In the following season the club had a contract dispute with Chen Zhizhao and they spent the whole season without their top goalscorer. Despite this they again just avoided relegation. With the team perpetual relegation contenders and constantly disappointing crowd support, the Hengyuan Corporation decided that it would be easier to bring the team back to Shanghai and closer to the company's headquarters. The club moved into 30,000 seater Jinshan Football Stadium at the beginning of the 2012 league campaign and was renamed Shanghai Shenxin Football Club.

After the renaming, the club struggled to stay afloat between the higher spending clubs in Shanghai, Shanghai Shenhua and Shanghai SIPG, and were relegated to the China League One following the 2015 season. In 2018 the club's owner Xu Guoliang and his company the Hengyuan Corporation would become embroiled in a bitter dispute with the Bank of Shanghai where he claimed that they had embezzled more than 20 billion yuan of his assets from his company and that now all of his assets were frozen. With the club's owner in financial difficulties they would sell any player to remain afloat, however this resulted in their relegation at the end of the 2019 league season. With even more of a loss of revenue from being in the third tier the club would admit to the Chinese Football Association that they were in financial difficulties and were unable to pay the teams wages for the whole of the 2019 league season so they decided to disband on 3 February 2020.

== Name history ==
- 2003: Shanghai Jinmao (上海金贸)
- 2003: Shanghai Hengyuan (上海衡源)
- 2004–2009: Nanchang Bayi Hengyuan (南昌八一衡源)
- 2010–2011: Nanchang Hengyuan (南昌衡源)
- 2012–2020: Shanghai Shenxin (上海申鑫)

== Rivalries ==
The club's main rivals are against Shanghai Shenhua and Shanghai SIPG whom they contest in the local Shanghai derby. The club's first top flight derby encounter occurred 12 May 2012 against Shenhua in a result that ended in a 0–0 draw. The following season Shenhua's long serving captain Yu Tao defected clubs, which enraged the Shenhua supporters and heated the rivalry between the two teams. The tie against Shanghai SIPG also contains strong links between the two teams. Players Jiang Zhipeng and Wang Jiayu had represented both teams before the two clubs met in their first derby on 2 June 2013, which resulted in a 6–1 victory to Shanghai SIPG. The club's geographical location has opened them up to rivalries with neighbouring clubs Hangzhou Greentown F.C. and Jiangsu Guoxin-Sainty F.C. where they contest in a fixture called the Yangtze Delta Derby.

== Managerial History ==
As of 4 February 2020

- (China) Kai Zhao (2003)
- (China) Li Xiao (2004–05)
- (China) Zhou Sui (Dec 7, 2005 – Feb 8, 2006)
- (China) Zhu Bo (Jan 1, 2006 – April 26, 2006)
- (China) Li Xiao (2006–08)
- (China) Zhu Jiong (Jan 1, 2009 – July 7, 2013)
- (China) Guo Guangqi (interim) (July 7, 2013 – Nov 29, 2013)
- (China) Cheng Yaodong (Nov 30, 2013 – Sep 29,2014)
- (China) Guo Guangqi (Sep 29, 2014 – Apr 13,2015)
- (China) Liu Junwei (Apr 13, 2015 – Dec 4,2015)
- (South Korea) Kim Sang-ho (Dec 4, 2015 – May 30, 2016)
- (England) Gary White (May 30, 2016 – Nov 23, 2016)
- (Spain) Juan Ignacio Martínez (Nov 23, 2016 – Nov 28, 2017)
- (China) Zhu Jiong (Dec 3, 2017 – Feb 4, 2020)

== Honours ==
- China League Two (tier III)
  - Champions (1): 2005

== Results ==
All-time League Rankings

- As of the end of 2019 season.

Year	Div	Pld	W	D	L	GF	GA	GD	Pts	Pos.	FA Cup	Super Cup	AFC	Att./G	Stadium
2003	3	10									DNQ	NH	DNQ		Zhabei Stadium
2004	3	22	13	4	5	30	15	15	40^{1}	6	DNQ	DNQ	DNQ		Nanchang Bayi Stadium
2005	3	19	11	4	4	27	15	12	27^{1}	W	DNQ	DNQ	DNQ		Nanchang Bayi Stadium
2006	2	24	4	8	12	11	27	−16	20	11	R1	NH	DNQ		Nanchang Bayi Stadium
2007	2	24	10	6	8	26	26	0	36	5	NH	NH	DNQ		Nanchang Bayi Stadium
2008	2	24	11	9	4	37	24	13	42	3	NH	NH	DNQ		Nanchang Bayi Stadium
2009	2	24	14	5	5	48	22	26	47	RU	NH	NH	DNQ		Nanchang Bayi Stadium
2010	1	30	8	8	14	33	35	−2	32	13	NH	NH	DNQ	11,680	Nanchang Bayi Stadium
2011	1	30	8	5	17	20	41	−21	29	14	R3	NH	DNQ	10,462	Nanchang Bayi Stadium
2012	1	30	6	12	12	36	35	1	30	15	R3	DNQ	DNQ	11,597	Jinshan Football Stadium
2013	1	30	11	7	12	31	42	−11	40	7	R4	DNQ	DNQ	8,559	Yuanshen Sports Centre Stadium
2014	1	30	9	6	15	26	42	−16	33	11	QF	DNQ	DNQ	10,115	Jinshan Football Stadium
2015	1	30	4	5	21	30	70	−40	17	16	R3	DNQ	DNQ	7,028	Yuanshen Sports Centre Stadium
2016	2	30	12	4	14	54	48	6	40	10	R4	DNQ	DNQ	3,816	Jinshan Football Stadium
2017	2	30	10	10	10	53	42	11	40	7	SF	DNQ	DNQ	5,031	Jinshan Football Stadium
2018	2	30	11	4	15	37	45	−8	37	11	R4	DNQ	DNQ	3,695	Jinshan Football Stadium
2019	2	30	3	3	24	30	82	−52	12	16	R5	DNQ	DNQ	1,820	Jinshan Football Stadium

- ^Note 1: in group stage

Key

	China top division
	China second division
	China third division
W	Winners
RU	Runners-up
3	Third place
	Relegated

- Pld = Played
- W = Games won
- D = Games drawn
- L = Games lost
- F = Goals for
- A = Goals against
- Pts = Points
- Pos = Final position
- DNQ = Did not qualify
- DNE = Did not enter
- NH = Not held
- R1 = Round 1
- R2 = Round 2
- R3 = Round 3
- R4 = Round 4
- F = Final
- SF = Semi-finals
- QF = Quarter-finals
- R16 = Round of 16
- Group = Group stage
- GS2 = Second Group stage
- QR1 = First Qualifying Round
- QR2 = Second Qualifying Round
- QR3 = Third Qualifying Round

== See also ==
- PLA Military Sports Training Center
- Bayi FC
